= List of Telugu films of 1993 =

This is a list of films produced by the Tollywood (Telugu language film industry) based in Hyderabad in 1993.

== List of released films ==
Title	Director	Cast	Music director	Sources
Aagraham	K. S. Ravikumar	Rajasekhar, Amala		
Aadarsham	Mouli	Jagapathi Babu, Ashwini Nachappa, Rahman		
Ankuram	C. Umamaheshwara Rao	Revathi, Sarath Babu, Om Puri		
Aasayam	Mohan Gandhi	Vijayashanti, Jagapathi Babu, Vijayakumar		
Abbaigaru	E. V. V. Satyanarayana	Daggubati Venkatesh, Meena	M. M. Keeravani	
Akka Pettanam Chelleli Kapuram	Dasari Narayana Rao	Rajendra Prasad, Aparna, Jayasudha		
Allari Alludu	A. Kodandarami Reddy	Nagarjuna, Naghma, Meena, Vanisri	M. M. Keeravani	
Allari Priyudu	K. Raghavendra Rao	Rajasekhar, Ramya Krishna, Madhoo	M. M. Keeravani	
Amma Koduku	Vadde Ramesh	Rajasekhar, Sukanya, Brahmanandam	Ilaiyaraaja	
Bangaru Bullodu	Raviraja Pinisetty	Nandamuri Balakrishna, Ramya Krishna, Raveena Tandon	Raj–Koti	
Bava Bavamaridi	Sarath	Suman, Krishnam Raju, Malashri, Jayasudha, Silk Smitha	Raj–Koti	
Chirunavvula Varamistava	N. H. Chandra	Vikram, Rani		
Chittemma Mogudu	Kodi Ramakrishna	Mohan Babu, Divya Bharati, Pooja Bedi, Brahmanandam	M. M. Keeravani	
Detective Narada	Vamshi	Mohan Babu, Nirosha, Mohini	Ilaiyaraaja	
Evandi Aavida Vachindi	E. V. V. Satyanarayana	Sobhan Babu, Vanisri, Sharada		
Gaayam	Ram Gopal Varma	Jagapathi Babu, Revathi Menon, Urmila Matondkar, Shiva Krishna, Kota Srinivasa Rao		
Joker	Vamshi	Rajendra Prasad, Vani Viswanath, Shamili	Vamshi	
Kannayya Kittayya	Relangi Narasimha Rao	Rajendra Prasad, Shobana, Aamani		
Kondapalli Raja	Raviraja Pinisetty	Daggubati Venkatesh, Naghma, Suman	M. M. Keeravani	
Kongu Chatu Krishnudu	K. Ajay Kumar	Naresh, Meena, Brahmanandam	Sri	
Kunti Putrudu	Dasari Narayana Rao	Mohan Babu, Vijayashanti	Ilaiyaraaja	
Major Chandrakanth	K. Raghavendra Rao	N.T. Rama Rao, Mohan Babu, Nagma, Ramya Krishna	M. M. Keeravani	
Manavarali Pelli	P N Ramachandra Rao	Harish, Soundarya, Sowcar Janaki	Vidyasagar	
Mayalodu	S. V. Krishna Reddy	Rajendra Prasad, Soundarya	S. V. Krishna Reddy	
Mechanic Alludu	B. Gopal	Chiranjeevi, Akkineni Nageswara Rao, Vijayashanti	Raj–Koti	
Money	Shiva Nageswara Rao	J. D. Chakravarthy, Chinna, Renuka Shahane, Jayasudha, Paresh Rawal	Sri	
Mister Pellam	Bapu	Rajendra Prasad, Aamani	M. M. Keeravani	
Mutha Mestri	A. Kodandarami Reddy	Chiranjeevi, Meena, Roja Selvamani	Raj–Koti	
Nippu Ravva	A. Kodandarami Reddy	Balakrishna Nandamuri, Vijayashanti, Shobana	Bappi Lahiri	
One By Two	Shiva Nageswara Rao	Meka Srikanth, J. D. Chakravarthy		
Parugo Parugu	Relangi Narasimha Rao	Rajendra Prasad, Shruti	Raj–Koti	
Paruvu Pratishta	V. C. Guhanathan	Suman, Suresh, Malashri, Lakshmi, Srividya, Raj Kumar, Srinath	Raj–Koti	
Pekata Papa Rao	Y Nageshwara Rao	Rajendra Prasad, Khushbu, Brahmanandam, Nirmalamma	Koti	
Pellama Majaka	Relangi Narasimha Rao	Brahmanandam, Sindhuja	K. Chakravarthy	
Pillalu Diddina Kapuram	Perala	Jagapathi Babu, Divyavani		
Prema Pusthakam	Gollapudi Srinivas	Ajith Kumar, Kanchan		
Rajendrudu Gajendrudu	S. V. Krishna Reddy	Rajendra Prasad, Soundarya	S. V. Krishna Reddy	
Rajeswari Kalyanam	Kranthi Kumar	ANR, Vanisri, Suresh, Meena		
Rakshana	Uppalapati Narayana Rao	Nagarjuna, Shobana, Roja Selvamani, Nassar	M. M. Keeravani	
Ratha Sarathi	Sarath	ANR, Vinod Kumar, Raveena Tandon		
Rendilla Poojari	T Prabhakar	Suman, Nagma, Shobana	M. M. Keeravani	
Rowdy Annayya	Tammareddy Bharadwaja	Ghattamaneni Krishna, Rambha	Action	
Srinatha Kavi Sarvabhowmudu	Bapu	N. T. Rama Rao, Jayasudha, Rajendra Prasad		
Tholi Muddhu	K. Reddy	Divya Bharti, Prashanth Thiagarajan		
Topi Raja Sweety Roja	N Shiva Prasad	Rajendra Prasad, Roja Selvamani	Rajendra Prasad	
Varasudu	E. V. V. Satyanarayana	Krishna, Nagarjuna, Naghma, Srikanth	M. M. Keeravani	
