= Lingababu Love Story =

- Title card
- Directed by: Vamsy
- Written by: Tanikella Bharani (dialogues)
- Screenplay by: Vamsy
- Story by: Janardhan Maharshi
- Produced by: P. Murali Mohan
- Starring: Rajendra Prasad; Rajasri
- Cinematography: Hari Anumolu
- Edited by: Uma Shankar Babu
- Music by: Vamsy
- Production companies: Sri Sravanathi Movies; Vineela Art Movies
- Release date: 1995
- Running time: 135 mins
- Country: India
- Language: Telugu

Lingababu Love Story is a 1995 Indian Telugu-language comedy film directed by Vamsy. It stars Rajendra Prasad, Rajasri, and music also composed by Vamsy. The film was recorded as a flop at the box office.

== Cast ==
- Rajendra Prasad as Lingababu
- Rajasri as Raaga
- Ali as Yama Guchi
- Tanikella Bharani as Pakir Dada
- Brahmanandam as Kevara
- Rallapalli as Velu Pille
- Mallikarjuna Rao as Chakram
- A.V.S as Pentapaadu Raja
- Sudhakar as Pentapaadu Kumar Raja
- M. S. Narayana as C.I. Bhajagovindam
- Suthi Velu as Doctor
- Sakshi Ranga Rao as Maamullu
- Ironleg Sastry as Food Inspector Vaali
- Dham as Beggar
- Prabha as Lingababu's mother
- Jayalalita as Aunty
- Kovai Sarala as Bank Manager Ambhujam
- Madhurima as Margaret
- Swathi as Swathi
- Kalpana Rai as Vaali's wife
- Y. Vijaya as Jyothi Lakshmi

== Soundtrack ==
Lingababu Love Story

Film score by Vamsy
- Released: 1995
- Genre: Soundtrack
- Length: 21:11
- Label: Supreme Music
- Producer: Vamsy

Vamsy chronology
Neeku 16 Naaku 18 (1994)	Lingababu Love Story (1995)	Prema & Co (1995)

Music composed by Vamsy. Music released on Supreme Music Company.

No.	Title	Lyrics	Singer(s)	Length
1.	"Subhodayam"	Jonnavithhula	S. P. Balasubrahmanyam, Lalitha Sagari	3:07
2.	"Jhummani Rana"	C. Kaladhar	S. P. Balasubrahmanyam, Usha Raj	4:44
3.	"Oke Ragamai"	Vennelakanti	S. P. Balasubrahmanyam, Chitra	4:55
4.	"Mallegali Sokindi"	Jonnavithhula	S. P. Balasubrahmanyam, Chitra	3:45
5.	"Aunty Roi"	Jonnavithhula	S. P. Balasubrahmanyam, Malgudi Subha, Jagajyothi Jayakumar	4:40
Total length:				21:11
