= Donga Ramudu and Party =

- Theatrical release poster
- Directed by: Vamsy
- Written by: Vamsy; Sankaramanchi Parthasaradhi (dialogues)
- Produced by: M. L. Kumar Chowdary
- Starring: Srikanth; Laya
- Cinematography: Loki P. Goud
- Edited by: Basva Paidireddy
- Music by: Chakri
- Production company: Kirthi Creations
- Release date: 26 June 2003
- Country: India
- Language: Telugu

Donga Ramudu and Party is a 2003 Indian Telugu-language comedy film written and directed by Vamsy. It stars Srikanth and Laya in the lead roles. The music of the film was composed by Chakri. The film released on 26 June 2003.

== Plot ==
Rama Krishna is a petty thief with his four-member team that also includes a lady. He falls in love with a journalist Vasantha Lakshmi.

Then there is a village in Konaseema called Kotayyavaripalem. There used to be an illustrious gentleman called Kotayya on whom the village is named after. His only daughter eloped with a guy she loved. Koatayya died later by writing a will that all his property should be passed on to the offspring of his daughter. He gave the responsibility of finding out the heir to a loyal man Somayajulu.

Vasantha Lakshmi is sent on to investigate more about that village by the editor. Rama Krishna, who is running away from the impending police plans to pretend as the grandson of Kotayya and enters Kotayyavaripalem. The rest of the story revolves around the point of Rama Krishna duping the village men and then reforming himself into a good human being with the help of Vasantha Lakshmi.

== Cast ==
- Srikanth as Ramakrishna
- Laya as Vasantha Lakshmi
- Jaya Prakash Reddy as Somayajulu
- Bhuvaneswari
- Krishna Bhagavaan
- Kondavalasa Lakshmana Rao
- Rallapalli
- Tanikella Bharani
- Jyothi Lakshmi
- Raj
- Mallikarjuna Rao
- Jeeva
- Kota Srinivasa Rao as K. Srinivas
- Surya as Manmadha Rao
- Shankar Melkote as Ravi K. Rao
- Bangalore Padma
- Suhasini Maniratnam

== Soundtrack ==
Music by Chakri. Devender Goud attended the film's audio launch.

- "Sirisiri Mallena" - S. P. Balasubrahmanyam, Sujatha
- "Preme Panchami Vennela" - S. P. Balasubrahmanyam, Sujatha
- "Chalirathiri Vastavani" - Srinivas, Sujatha
- "Edo Edo Teeyani Daaham" - S. P. Balasubrahmanyam, Sujatha
- "Kallallone Nuvvu" - S. P. Balasubrahmanyam, Sujatha
- "Vannelunna Naari" - S. P. Balasubrahmanyam, Sujatha

== Reception ==
A critic from Sify wrote that "It is a predictable film with no twists in the climax. Vamsi has tried to recreate the magic of Avunu Valliddharu Ishta Paddaru, but the narration goes awry". Jeevi of Idlebrain.com wrote that "Vamsi - who mastered the art of village comedy with his typical characterization ability - could not succeed in generating the desired result because of the improper screenplay and narration".
