= O Panaipothundi Babu =

Indian comedy drama film

- Directed by: Siva Nageswara Rao
- Screenplay by: Siva Nageswara Rao
- Produced by: Kandikanti Raj Kumar
- Starring: Suresh; Ravi Teja; Indraja; Maheswari
- Cinematography: K. Purna
- Music by: Vandemataram Srinivas
- Production company: Pramada Films
- Release date: 8 August 1998
- Country: India
- Language: Telugu

O Panaipothundi Babu is a 1998 Indian Telugu-language comedy drama film directed by Siva Nageswara Rao starring Suresh, Ravi Teja, Indraja and Maheswari. Both Suresh and Ravi Teja play dual roles in the film. The title of the film is inspired by the song of the same name from the 1997 film Preminchukundam Raa.

== Plot ==
The film revolves around two pairs of twins who are switched at birth due to the negligence of hospital staff, leading to a series of comedic errors and confusion. One pair of twins, belonging to a wealthy businessman, and the other pair, the children of a thief, are both named after Rama and Lakshmana. The wealthy pair grow up to become businessmen, while the other pair follow in their father's criminal footsteps and become thieves.

The good pair has an unscrupulous uncle, Aravindaswamy, who conspires to have them kidnapped by a thug, Ajhar Bhai, in order to settle his debts through ransom. Meanwhile, the bad pair, residing in Visakhapatnam, travels to Hyderabad for some work. Upon seeing the good pair's resemblance, inspector Agni, who is the brother-in-law of the wealthy twins, mistakes them for the good pair and takes them to their house.

The bad twins, realizing they have an identical pair, decide to stay at the house until the real twins appear. Aravindaswamy, recognizing their intentions, strikes a deal with them to seize the wealth of the good pair. The good twins escape from Ajhar Bhai and return home, only to be imprisoned as impostors by their uncle. The bad twins follow them to jail with plans to kill them and assume their identity permanently. However, the good twins overpower them and escape from jail.

The bad twins also manage to break free, leading to a struggle for identity. The situation is eventually resolved when the father of the rich twins arrives from the U.S., and the parents of the bad twins arrive to clarify the confusion. Inspector Agni's grandmother, Kadiyam Suryakantham, solves the mystery by investigating their birth details, confirming their true identities. The film concludes with a final confrontation, where Ajhar Bhai, who kidnaps everyone, is killed.

== Cast ==
- Suresh as Ram & Ram (dual role)
- Ravi Teja as Lakshaman & Lakshman (dual role)
- Indraja
- Raksha
- Maheswari
- Brahmanandam as Inspector Agni & Kadiyam Suryakantham (dual role)
- Tanikella Bharani as Aravindaswamy
- Srihari as Ajhar Bhai
- Giri Babu as Businessman (father of one pair of Ram & Lakshman)
- Rallapalli as Thief (father of one pair of Ram & Lakshman)
- M. S. Narayana
- Mallikarjuna Rao
- Narsing Yadav
- Raksha
- Kavya
- Janardhana Maharshi

== Production ==
This is Suresh's first film in which he plays two roles and he expressed content for being a part of the film.

== Soundtrack ==
The music was composed by Vandemataram Srinivas.

Track listing
No.	Title	Length
1.	"Chitram Vichitram"	4:37
2.	"Nee Vorachupullo"	4:25
3.	"Om Namaha Shivaya"	4:36
Total length:		13:38

== Reception ==
A critic from Andhra Today wrote, "Director Siva Nageswara Rao, who always manages to make his movies a box-office hit evoking the interest of the audience with a special humorous character, failed to repeat his magic formula with his burlesque characters [...]. The failure to show some difference in the two pairs also creates a lot of confusion in the minds of the audience, who lose interest in the movie. There is no novelty in the movie and the dialogues, which are the lifeline of a comedy, can hardly be called hilarious".
