= Maharshi (1987 film) =

- DVD Cover
- Directed by: Vamsy
- Written by: Vamsy; Vemuri Satyanaryana; Tanikella Bharani
- Produced by: Sravanthi Ravi Kishore
- Starring: Raghava; Nishanti; Krishna Bhagavaan; C. V. L. Narasimha Rao
- Cinematography: Hari Anumolu
- Edited by: Anil Malnad
- Music by: Ilaiyaraaja
- Production company: Sri Sravanthi Movies
- Release date: 31 December 1987
- Country: India
- Language: Telugu

Maharshi (transl. Great sage) is a 1987 Indian Telugu-language drama film directed by Vamsy, who co-wrote the film with Vemuri Satyanarayana and Tanikella Bharani. The film stars Raghava, Nishanti, Krishna Bhagavaan, and C. V. L. Narasimha Rao. The music was composed by Ilaiyaraaja with cinematography by Hari Anumolu and editing by Anil Malnad. The film marks the debut of Raghava, who later prefixed the film's title to his name. The film was an average grosser at the box office, but later on attained cult status.

== Plot ==
Maharshi is a carefree college student from a wealthy family. He is known in the college for his arrogant behaviour, maintaining a gang of friends, teasing lecturers, and beating up classmates. However, things change when he meets Suchitra in college. She loathes him, owing to his rude behaviour, and does not even talk to him when he approaches her. Maharshi takes a liking to her and tries to win her by approaching her parents and showing off his wealth. Suchitra turns down the offer even after her parents show interest. Maharshi then scares and turns away the prospective grooms who come to Suchitra's home.

Suchitra meets her childhood friend Tilak, who is a police sub-inspector in the same town. Soon after, she expresses her wish to marry him, more with the objective of eliminating Maharshi. When Maharshi discovers this, he tries to stop the wedding but is locked up in a police station at his own father's insistence. However, he assumes that Tilak has used his power as a sub-inspector and locked him up. He tries to attack Tilak at their own home but stops when he sees Suchitra open the door. Gradually, Maharshi slips into depression and is hospitalised.

Maharshi's love for Suchitra is shown when his friend Ramana drugs Suchitra and brings her to Maharshi's home, assuming that Maharshi wants to sleep with her. Maharshi slaps Ramana and explains that he wants her affection and love and not her body; they carefully take her back.

Tilak tries to help Maharshi by befriending him and helping him mingle with Suchitra. As he recovers, they suggest that he get married, but Maharshi turns crazy at the suggestion and runs away screaming. He is hospitalized again but manages to escape from there.

Suchitra and Tilak have a baby together. Maharshi snatches Suchitra's newborn baby and escapes into the city with the police searching for him. In the end, as he falls from a building along with the baby, he dies saving it, thus earning Suchitra's affection.

== Cast ==
- Raghava as Maharshi
- Nishanti as Suchitra
- Krishna Bhagavan as Inspector Tilak
- Sanjeevi Mudili
- C. V. L. Narasimha Rao as Ramana
- Ramjagan
- Shyam Prasad
- Sivaji Raja
- Priyanka
- Rajitha
- Pavala Syamala
- Kanchanamala

== Production ==
Karthik, Revathi and Rajendra Prasad were originally cast and even paid advances; however, they were later replaced with Raghava, Nishanti and Krishna Bhagavan.

== Soundtrack ==
The soundtrack was composed by Ilaiyaraaja and was released through the ECHO music label. Vennelakanti wrote the song "Maataraani Mounamidi" in mukta pada grastam, in which the first word of each line of the pallavi is followed by the last word of the previous line. That song was later remade by Ilayaraja as "Manja Podi" for Tamil film Shenbagamae Shenbagamae (1988). For Nuvve Kavali (2000), Sravanthi Ravi Kishore asked Koti to reuse the tune of "Maataraani Mounamidi" for "Kallalloki Kallu Petti".

Track listing
No.	Title	Lyrics	Singer(s)	Length
1.	"Urvashi (Sanskrit Disco)"	Jonnavittula Ramalingeswara Rao	S. P. Balasubrahmanyam, Ilaiyaraaja	4:37
2.	"Suman Prati Sumam"	Nayani Krishnamurthy	S. P. Balasubrahmanyam, S. Janaki	4:47
3.	"Maataraani Mounamidi"	Vennelakanti	S. P. Balasubrahmanyam, S. Janaki	4:37
4.	"Saahasam Naa Patham"	Sirivennela Seetharama Sastry	S. P. Balasubrahmanyam & Chorus	4:39
5.	"Konalo"	Jonnavittula Ramalingeswara Rao	S. P. Balasubrahmanyam, S. Janaki	4:35
Total length:				23:15

== Reception ==
Griddaluri Gopalrao of Zamin Ryot, on his review, dated 8 January 1988, appreciated the visuals by cinematographer Hari Anumolu. Gopalrao however criticised the soundtrack of the film, "In addition to Telugu songs, there's even one in Sanskrit but none of them are good [sic]," he added. Srinivas Kanchibhotla writing for Idlebrain.com opined that Maharshi is Vamsy's "best work till date", He added, "Stepping away from the comedic route that he was wildly successful at, Vamsi challenges himself on convincing the audience of Maharshi's true intentions and the severity of his love that borders on obsession and madness."
