= Veedekkadi Mogudandi! =

2001 film

Veedekkadi Mogudandi...!
- Poster
- Directed by: E. V. V. Satyanarayana
- Screenplay by: E. V. V. Satyanarayana
- Story by: Subhash
- Produced by: Yalamanchali Sai Babu
- Starring: Venu; Sruthi Raj
- Cinematography: Ekanath
- Music by: Koti
- Production company: Sri Saibaba Movies
- Release date: 15 November 2001
- Country: India
- Language: Telugu

Veedekkadi Mogudandi...! (transl. What kind of a husband is he!) is a 2001 Indian Telugu-language comedy drama film directed by E. V. V. Satyanarayana. The film stars Venu and Sruthi Raj. The film's musical score is by Koti, and the film released on 15 November 2001. It was an average grosser at the box office.

== Plot ==
Sriram, a staunch believer in astrology, learns from a prediction that his wife will die during childbirth. Fearing this outcome, he decides never to marry. His father and elder brother attempt to change his mind, as elder brother's wife is unable to conceive, leaving the family without heirs. Despite their efforts, Sriram uses various tricks to avoid marriage.

Eventually, the family arranges Sriram's marriage to Sruth. In an attempt to escape the wedding, Sriram falsely claims he is already married, but Sruthi persists and marries him regardless. After the marriage, Sriram continues to avoid consummating the relationship. Sriram's elder brother intervenes by giving him aphrodisiac tablets, leading to Sruthi becoming pregnant and giving birth to a healthy child. This experience causes Sriram to abandon his belief in astrology.

== Cast ==
- Venu as Sriram
- Sruthi Raj as Sruthi (Voice dubbed by Sunitha)
- Geetu Mohandas as Sruthi's younger sister
- Kota Srinivasa Rao as Sriram's father
- Brahmanandam
- Chandra Mohan as Sriram's elder brother
- Ahuti Prasad
- Mallikarjuna Rao as the astrologer
- Ali as Sruthi's cousin
- Rallapalli
- M. S. Narayana as Sruthi's father
- A. V. S. as Sastry
- Chalapathi Rao as doctor
- Raja Ravindra
- Bandla Ganesh
- Mukku Raju
- Kadambari Kiran
- Devi
- Priyanka
- Subharani

== Production ==
This film marks the return of E. V. V. Satyanarayana to the comedy genre after Ammo! Okato Tareekhu and Maa Aavida Meeda Ottu Mee Aavida Chala Manchidi. The film's story was written by Tamil film director K. Subhash and it was launched on 15 May 2001.

== Soundtrack ==
The soundtrack was composed by Koti.

All lyrics are written by Sirivennela Seetharama Sastry.

Track listing
No.	Title	Singer(s)	Length
1.	"Paalu Ready"	Udit Narayan, K. S. Chithra	4:03
2.	"Thaluku Thaluku"	Udit Narayan, K. S. Chithra	5:33
3.	"Paadave Koyila"	Sriram Prabhu, Raadhika	4:05
4.	"Ayyo Babu"	Tippu, Raadhika	5:05
5.	"Julie Laila Sushma"	S. P. Balasubrahmanyam, Sujatha Mohan	6:01
6.	"Maghuvani Nammakura"	S. P. Balasubrahmanyam	4:58
Total length:			28:50

== Reception ==
Gudipoodi Srihari of The Hindu wrote, "The strength of the film is its dialogue by Marudhuri Raja and his associates, which is the main vehicle of humour. Comedy is EVV's forte and director seems to be comfortable". Jeevi of Idlebrain.com gave the film a rating of 3.25/5 and opined, "This is a 'must-watch' film for all the EVV movie lovers".

== Box office ==
The film was a box office failure.
