= Ammo! Okato Tareekhu =

- DVD cover
- Directed by: E. V. V. Satyanarayana
- Written by: E. V. V. Satyanarayana
- Dialogues by: Janardhana Maharshi
- Produced by: K. Chandrasekhar
- Starring: Srikanth; Raasi; Suresh; Mumtaj; Surya; Prema; L. B. Sriram
- Cinematography: Adumusumilli Vijay Kumar
- Edited by: Ravindra Babu
- Music by: Vandemataram Srinivas
- Production company: A. A. Arts
- Release date: 20 October 2000
- Country: India
- Language: Telugu

Ammo! Okato Tareekhu (transl. Oh, no! It's first of the month) is a 2000 Indian Telugu-language black comedy film written and directed by E. V. V. Satyanarayana, and produced by K. Chandrasekhar under A. A. Arts. The film features an ensemble cast including Srikanth, Raasi, Suresh, Mumtaj, Surya, Prema and L. B. Sriram. The music was composed by Vandemataram Srinivas. The film deals with problems in the middle class families.

== Cast ==
- Srikanth as Pattabhi, Gayatri's husband
- Raasi as Gayatri, Govind Rao's second daughter
- Suresh as Kiran "G. K.", Govind Rao's son
- Mumtaj as Ganga, Kiran's wife
- Surya as Sagar, Dhana Lakshmi's husband
- Prema as Dhana Lakshmi, Govind Rao's eldest daughter
- L. B. Sriram as Govind Rao
- Aalapati Lakshmi as Sowbhagyam
- Kota Srinivasa Rao as Anjaneyulu, Govind Rao's father
- Lahari as Parvati, Govind Rao's youngest daughter
- Tanikella Bharani as Gireesham
- Chalapathi Rao as Devudu
- Dubbing Janaki as Devudu's mother
- Brahmanandam
- M. S. Narayana
- Mallikarjuna Rao as Kranti
- Namala Moorti
- Ali as Jamadagni
- Raja Ravindra as Kiran's friend
- Tirupathi Prakash as Kiran's friend
- Bandla Ganesh as Kranti's assistant
- Devadas Kanakala as Judge
- Kadambari Kiran as cab driver
- Sana
- Banda Jyoti

== Soundtrack ==
All music is composed by Vandemataram Srinivas

Track list
No.	Title	Lyrics	Singer(s)	Length
1.	"Nee Aakupacha Cheera"	Bhuvana Chandra	Udit Narayan, Mahalakshmi Iyer	5:39
2.	"Preyasi I Love You"	Bhuvana Chandra	Sonu Nigam, Sunitha	5:06
3.	"Navvuko Pichi Nayana"	Sirivennela Seetharama Sastry	Mano, Gopika Poornima	4:58
4.	"Sagatu Manishi"	Sirivennela Seetharama Sastry	K. J. Yesudas	5:56
5.	"Amrutha Kadaley"	Chirravuri Vijay Kumar	Sukhwinder Singh, Sadhana Sargam	5:19
Total length:				27:00

== Reception ==
B. Srinivas of Sify wrote that "EVV Satyanarayana’s Ammo! Okatothedi is a thought-provoking movie that tries to come up with a logical solution for the Indian middle-class. He wants every member of the family to earn a decent living, instead of leaving the burden on one individual. EVV has an excellent performer in L B Sriram. The characters he weaves like the nagging aged father, an irresponsible son, and daughters, who are more close to reality, seem very true-to-life". Telugu Cinema wrote "Though the film, lacking in novelty in story and treatment, is not flimsy it doesn’t live up to the tall claims director EVV has made". Andhra Today wrote "Audience who clamor for entertainment will surely be bored with the plethora of problems that the movie reminds them of. The movie might find few takers. Being true to reality and finding the right solution to the problems will find praise with the audience. But this movie has too many unnatural sequences and contrivances. Even the so called entertainment track fails to impress the audience. The long speeches of the climax in the court scene will surely win credit for the movie". Indiainfo wrote "EVV gives a humorous twist to what is otherwise a heart-rending story. His objective seems to be to tell people how to live happily even in misery. The movie does not have anything interesting to offer as the insipid story and lack of novelty puts the viewers off. It is very difficult for one not to walk out from the theatre in the middle. The performance by L B Sriram is very good. But there is nothing to write home about the performance of others".
