= Kishkindha Kanda (film) =

1994 Telugu film by T. Prabhakar

- Directed by: T. Prabhakar
- Story by: G. V. Amareswara Rao
- Produced by: T. Ramesh Babu
- Dialogues by: L. B. Sriram
- Starring: Anand Babu; Padmasri; Chinna
- Cinematography: T. Surendra Reddy
- Edited by: Ravindra Babu
- Music by: M. M. Keeravani
- Production company: Srujana Films
- Release date: 7 July 1994
- Running time: 125 minutes
- Country: India
- Language: Telugu

Kishkindha Kanda is a 1994 Indian Telugu-language comedy film directed by T. Prabhakar and produced by T. Ramesh Babu under the Srujana Films banner. The film features Anand Babu, Padmasri, and Chinna in the lead roles, with an ensemble cast of comedians in supporting roles. The story is based on the 1963 American film It's a Mad, Mad, Mad, Mad World. The film's dialogues were penned by L. B. Sriram, and the music was composed by M. M. Keeravani. Kishkindha Kanda was released on 7 July 1994.

== Plot ==
A man named Bhetalam, on his deathbed, confesses to a group of travellers that he has hidden stolen gold in a cemetery. This revelation sets off a frantic quest among the travellers, each driven by greed and desperation to claim the treasure first. As the pursuit unfolds, betrayal and cunning dominate their race for the hidden fortune.

== Cast ==
- Anand Babu
- Padmasri
- Chinna
- Silk Smitha
- Praveen Kumar
- Brahmanandam
- Ali
- Tanikella Bharani as Bhetalam
- Dharmavarapu Subramanyam
- Kota Srinivasa Rao
- AVS
- Sri Lakshmi
- Y. Vijaya
- Ironleg Sastri
- Mallikarjuna Rao
- Babu Mohan
- L. B. Sriram
- Nagesh
- Narsing Yadav
- Gundu Hanumantha Rao
- Vallabhaneni Janardhan
- Giri Babu
- Rallapalli
- Ragini
- Kallu Chidambaram
- Jenny
- Malgudi Subha as herself in song "Kokketho Kelithe"

== Production ==
The film was directed by T. Prabhakar and produced by T. Ramesh Babu under Srujana Films. It was presented by Gangula Prabhakar Reddy. The story was written by G. V. Amareswara Rao, with dialogues penned by L. B. Sriram.

Kishkindha Kanda is based on the 1963 American film It's a Mad, Mad, Mad, Mad World.

== Music ==
The soundtrack of Kishkindha Kanda was composed by M. M. Keeravani.

One of the songs, "Gujarati Paradala Punjabi Paruvala", was based on a tune originally created for the unreleased film Missamma, directed by Vijay Nalla. After that film was shelved, Keeravani repurposed the tune for Kishkindha Kanda. The same tune was later reused for the song "Ammaina Nannaina" in Simhadri (2003).

Track listing
No.	Title	Lyrics	Singer(s)	Length
1.	"Tholi Valapula"	Veturi	S. P. Balasubrahmanyam, K. S. Chithra	4:18
2.	"Kokettu Kelithe"	Bhuvanachandra	Malgudi Subha	4:37
3.	"Gujarati Paradala Punjabi Paruvala"	Jonnavithula	S. P. Balasubrahmanyam, K. S. Chithra	5:08
4.	"Emananti"	Sahithi	Radhika	3:47
Total length:				17:50
