= Mallikarjuna Rao (actor) =

Indian actor, comedian (1950/51–2008)

- Born: 1950 or 1951; Anakapalle, Andhra Pradesh, India
- Died: 24 June 2008 (aged 57); Hyderabad, Andhra Pradesh, India
- Other name: Battala Satti
- Occupations: Actor; comedian
- Years active: 1973–2008

Peela Mallikarjuna Rao (1950/1951 – 24 June 2008) was an Indian actor and comedian who worked in Telugu films. Rao is known for his role in the movie Ladies Tailor, and he has acted in at least 375 movies.

== Early life ==
Rao was born in Kasimkota in Anakapalle, Visakhapatnam district.

== Career ==
Mallikarjuna Rao started his career in films in 1973. He became popular with the role of 'Battala Sattigadu' in Ladies Tailor, directed by Vamsi. Ladies Tailor, Hello Brother, Tammudu and Badri are some of the films in which he entertained audiences with his comedy.

Telugu actor, writer Tanikella Bharani treats Mallikarjuna Rao with high respect since the days of Ladies Tailor movie and to his credit Mallikarjuna Rao introduced L.B. Sriram, actor cum writer to director Vamsi, who gave chance to LB Sriram in his movie. Mallikarjuna Rao was the general secretary of the Movie Artists Association. He also served as the chairman of Sri Venkateswara Swami temple in Srinagar colony, Hyderabad. He is one of the senior most comedians in Tollywood.

"Mallikarjuna Rao was not only a unique actor but also a good human being. He always tried to help others whenever he can," Chiranjeevi said. Several actors recalled the help they received from Rao, who was general secretary of Telugu Movie Artists Association (MAA). Rao was also the secretary of Telugu Desam Party's cultural wing. Party chief N Chandrababu Naidu conveyed his condolences to Rao's family members over the phone. Chief Minister Y S Rajasekhara Reddy too condoled the death of the popular comedian. Rao was survived by wife, two daughters and a son.

== Death ==
He died of leukaemia on 24 June 2008 in Hyderabad.

== Awards ==
- Nandi Award for Best Character Actor for Thammudu

== Filmography ==
This is the filmography of the Indian actor, Mallikarjuna Rao.

- Kirayi Rowdylu (1981)
- Manchu Pallaki (1982) as Film Director
- Idi Pellantara (1982)
- Abhilasha (1983)
- Ramarajyamlo Bheemaraju (1983)
- Sitaara (1984)
- Danavudu (1984)
- Jagan (1984)
- Rustum (1984) as Gopayya
- Preminchu Pelladu (1985)
- Kongumudi (1985)
- Maha Manishi (1985)
- Anveshana (1985) as Puliraju
- Swathi Muthyam (1986)
- Chaitanyam (1986)
- Deshoddarakudu (1986)
- Ladies Tailor (1986)
- Bhargava Ramudu (1987)
- Lawyer Suhasini (1987)
- Raga Leela (1987)
- Bhanumati Gari Mogudu (1987)
- Swayamkrushi (1987)
- Gandhinagar Rendava Veedhi (1987)
- Sruthilayalu (1987)
- Sankeertana (1987)
- Sthree Sahasam (1987) as Pasupathi's (Sarathi) father-in-law
- Sri Kanaka Mahalakshmi Recording Dance Troupe (1987)
- Varasudochadu (1988)
- Station Master (1988)
- Anna Chellelu (1988) as Chitti Babu
- Chettu Kinda Pleader (1989) as Yesupadam
- Sarvabhoumudu (1989) as Mantamandel Rao
- Hai Hai Nayaka (1989)
- Soggadi Kaapuram (1989) as Corrupt lawyer
- Gopala Rao Gari Abbayi (1989)
- Sakshi (1989)
- Bhooporatam (1989)
- Aakhari Kshanam (1989)
- Bala Gopaludu (1989)
- Praja Theerpu (1989)
- Aarthanadham (1989) as Avatharam
- Chevilo Puvvu (1990) as Peon Appa Rao
- Rao Gari Intlo Rowdy (1990)
- Kokila (1990)
- Aayudham (1990)
- Iddaru Iddare (1990)
- Kaliyuga Abhimanyudu (1990) as Venkanna Babu
- Iddaru Pellala Muddula Police (1991) as Madhavaiah
- Edurinti Mogudu Pakkinti Pellam (1991) as Pullaiah
- Kobbari Bondam (1991)
- Police Encounter (1991)
- April 1 Vidudala (1991) as Chinna Rao
- Attintlo Adde Mogudu (1991)
- Sundarakanda (1992)
- Appula Appa Rao (1992)
- Samsarala Mechanic (1992)
- Detective Narada (1992)
- Alexander (1992)
- Rajendrudu Gajendrudu (1993)
- Ali Baba Aradajanu Dongalu (1993)
- Donga Alludu (1993)
- Joker (1993) as Subbaraju
- Repati Rowdy(1993)
- Aadarsham (1993)
- Nippu Ravva (1993)
- Asale Pellaina Vaani (1993)
- Abbayigaru (1993)
- Hello Brother (1994)
- Gharana Alludu (1994) as Military Commander whose gun is stolen
- Allarodu (1994) as Aakasaramaiah
- Prema & Co (1994)
- Bhale Mavayya (1994)
- Top Hero (1994)
- Allari Police (1994)
- Donga Rascal (1994)
- Palleturi Mogudu (1994) as Chitrangi's Husband
- M Dharmaraju MA (1994)
- Sundara Vadana Subbulakshmi Moguda (1994)
- Maga Rayudu (1994)
- Parugo Parugu (1994) as S. I. Appalakonda
- Kishkindha Kanda (1994)
- Sisindri (1995)
- Vajram (1995)
- Taj Mahal (1995)
- Khaidi Inspector (1995) as Head Constable Vishwanatham
- Subha Sankalpam (1995)
- Madhya Taragati Maha Bharatnam (1995)
- Sogasu Chooda Tarama! (1995)
- Ketu Duplicate (1995)
- Raja Simham (1995)
- Miss 420 (1995)
- Ghatothkachudu (1995)
- Telugu Veera Levara (1995) as Harischandrudu B.A.
- Street Fighter (1995) as Lawyer
- Alibaba Adbhuta Deepam (1995) as Rettala Pittaiah
- Alluda Majaka (1995)
- Jagadeka Veerudu (1996)
- Topi Raja Sweety Roja (1996)
- Koothuru (1996)
- Adhrindi Alludu (1996)
- Bobbili Bullodu (1996)
- Vamsanikokkadu (1996)
- Amma Nanna Kavali (1996)
- Family (1996)
- Nalla Pussalu (1996)
- Intlo Illalu Vantintlo Priyuralu (1996)
- Akkum Bakkum (1996)
- Ramudochadu (1996)
- Akkada Ammayi Ikkada Abbayi (1996)
- Vinodam (1996)
- Dongaata (1997)
- Aahvaanam (1997)
- Ugadi (1997)
- Nayanamma (1997)
- Osi Naa Maradala (1997)
- Pattukondi Chuddam (1997)
- Kaliyugamlo Gandaragolam (1997)
- Vammo Vatto O Pellaamo (1997)
- Subhakankshalu (1997)
- W/o V. Vara Prasad (1997)
- Pelli (1997)
- Ayyinda Leda (1997) as Mammootty, Hotel Owner
- Chilakkottudu (1997)
- Muddula Mogudu (1997)
- Bobbili Dora (1997)
- Gokulamlo Seeta (1997)
- Annamayya (1997)
- Maa Nannaku Pelli (1997)
- Oka Chinna Maata (1997)
- Thaali (1997)
- Pelli Pandiri (1997)
- Rajahamsa (1998)
- Ooyala (1998)
- Ulta Palta (1998)
- Suryavamsam (1998)
- Maavidaakulu (1998)
- Subbaraju Gari Kutumbam (1998)
- Pavitra Prema (1998)
- Pelli Kanuka (1998)
- O Panaipothundi Babu (1998)
- Suprabhatam (1998)
- Suryudu (1998)
- Prema Kosam (1999)
- Sneham Kosam (1999)
- Iddaru Mitrulu (1999)
- Harischandra (1999)
- Maa Balaji (1999)
- Thammudu (1999) as Malli
- Ravoyi Chandamama (1999) as Mallaiah
- Nuvvu Vastavani (2000)
- Badri (2000) as Manikantha
- Goppinti Alludu (2000)
- Navvuthu Bathakalira (2001)
- Bhadrachalam (2001)
- Ammo Bomma (2001)
- Ammo! Okato Tareekhu (2000)
- Nuvvu Naaku Nachav (2001)
- Bava Nachadu (2001)
- Bhalevadivi Basu (2001) as Ammu Raju
- Preminchu (2001)
- Kalisi Naduddam (2001)
- Akasa Veedhilo (2001)
- Prema Sandadi (2001)
- Thank You Subba Rao (2001)
- Jabili (2001)
- 6 Teens (2001)
- Veedekkadi Mogudandi! (2001)
- Simharasi (2001)
- Raghava (2002)
- Tappu Chesi Pappu Koodu (2002)
- Sahasa Baludu Vichitra Kothi (2002) as Manager Pichayya
- Vachina Vaadu Suryudu (2002)
- Avunu Valliddaru Ista Paddaru! (2002)
- Girl Friend (2002)
- Fools (2003)
- Johnny (2003) as Anthony
- Simhachalam (2003) as Thaadi Mattaiah
- Aadanthe Ado Type (2003)
- Ottesi Cheputunna (2003)
- Ninne Ishtapaddanu (2003)
- Palnati Brahmanayudu (2003)
- Seetayya (2003)
- Nenu Pelliki Ready (2003)
- Preminchukunnam Pelliki Randi (2003)
- Maa Alludu Very Good (2003)
- Lakshmi Narasimha (2004)
- Swetha Naagu (2004)
- Varsham (2004)
- Malliswari (2004)
- 143 (2004)
- Bhadradri Ramudu (2004)
- Venky (2004) as Jagadamba Chowdary (J.C.)
- Andaru Dongale Dorikite (2004)
- Chanti (2004)
- Evadi Gola Vaadidhi (2005)
- Adirindayya Chandram (2005)
- Dhairyam (2005)
- Sada Mee Sevalo (2005)
- Nuvvante Naakishtam (2005)
- Dhana 51 (2005)
- Chakram (2005)
- Athadu (2005)
- Pournami (2006) as Priest
- Veedhi (2006)
- Kithakithalu (2006)
- Mayajalam (2006)
- Gopi – Goda Meeda Pilli (2006)
- Bhagyalakshmi Bumper Draw (2006)
- Annavaram (2006)
- Athili Sattibabu LKG (2007)
- Gundamma Gaari Manavadu (2007)
- Dubai Seenu (2007)
- Bhajantrilu (2007)
- Seema Sastri (2007)
- Allare Allari (2007)
- Yamagola Malli Modalayindi (2007)
- Raju Bhai (2007)
- Pellaindi Kaani (2007)
- Nava Vasantham (2007)
- Pagale Vennela (2007)
- Mantra (2007)
- Swagatam (2008)
- Krishnarjuna (2008)
- Bommana Brothers Chandana Sisters (2008)
- Rainbow (2008)
- Michael Madana Kamaraju (2008)
- Baladoor (2008)
- Nenu Meeku Telusa? (2008)
- Jalsa (2008)
- Bhale Dongalu (2008) as Kotaiah
- Veedu Mamoolodu Kadu (2008) (posthumous release)
- Sweet Heart (2009) (posthumous release)
- Dasanna (2010)
- Dammunnodu (2010)
