= April 1 Vidudala =

1991 film by Vamsy

- Film poster
- Directed by: Vamsy
- Screenplay by: Vamsy; Krishna Bhagavan
- Based on: Harischandrudu Abaddhamaadithe by Kolapalli Eswara Rao; M. I. Kishan
- Produced by: P. V. Bhaskar Reddy
- Starring: Rajendra Prasad; Shobhana
- Cinematography: M. V. Raghu
- Edited by: Uma Shankar Babu
- Music by: Ilaiyaraaja
- Production companies: Poorna Teja Creations & Sri Sravanthi Movies (presents)
- Release date: 1 February 1991
- Running time: 146 minutes
- Country: India
- Language: Telugu

April 1 Vidudala (transl. April 1 release) is a 1991 Indian Telugu-language comedy drama film directed by Vamsy. An adaptation of the novel Harischandrudu Abaddhamaadithe, the film stars Rajendra Prasad and Shobana in lead roles. The music was composed by Ilaiyaraaja.

The film received Nandi Award for Best Audiographer. It was remade in Tamil as Sathyavan (1994) and in Kannada as Mr. Harishchandra (2001).

== Plot ==
The film begins at Vizianagaram, where Diwakaram, a videographer, arrives from Rajahmundry to shoot a wedding. Inadvertently, it goes under trouble for a dowry when Bhuvaneswari, a dauntless & dignified railway booking clerk, resists and vows to ensure. Diwakaram falls for her in that flash, learns she is single, and says she will get to Rajamandry soon on transfer. He gains details of Bhuvaneswari from her maternal uncle Jagannatham, that she aspires to knit a man of proper pride & honesty. Anyhow, her rapacious mother possesses a son-in-law with all riches. Diwakaram traps Jagannatham, and he promises to convince Bhuvaneswari somehow and sends him back. Diwakaram resides in the Railway Colony, where diverse employees of various mindsets stay together: Dr. Krupamani, guardian of Divakaram and raised him as her foster child, Chinna Rao, married twice and lusts for colleague Rama Murthy's wife, Bhagyam. Bhagyam maintains an affair with their neighbor, Tamilian Rajan—Murthy & his wife, Varalakshmi, who lawlessly conducts the chit fund. Sharma is a suspended worker who acolytes to Diwakaram.

Right now, Diwakaram declares to start a video rental shop to impress Bhuvaneswari as a well-settled man. Firstly, he trickily acquires permission from Krupamani to use the front portion to construct his shop. To secure the capital, Diwakaram gimmicks with the residents based on their weaknesses, i.e., blackmailing Bhagyam & Rajyam to reveal their matter, cheating Chinna Rao to fuse him with Bhagyam, and claims a chit from Murthy's couple, which he never was a member of, and so on. Ultimately, he opens the shop, makes quick money through fraud, and does everything Bhuvaneswari & her mother aspire to. Parallelly, he regularly receives letters from Bhuvaneswari, as if she is in love with him. All the creditors fight for their returns but can not demand since Diwakaram's central assert, his ruffian best friend Gopichand, whose presence is a terror.

The tale twists into a severe case: the area Circle Inspector's son Sundar Kumar deceives Gopi's sibling Bala, who conceives. Hence, enraged Gopi slaughters Sundar Kumar in a football match, which Diwakaram accidentally records. Whereat, Sharma warns him to destroy it, which Diwakaram initially denies. Later, he covertly burns the tape to get away with it.

Meanwhile, Bhuvaneswari lands when Diwakaram immediately approaches her. Startlingly, she behaves unbeknownst to him when Diwakaram realizes that Jagannatham put him in a trance to escape from his pester. From there, Diwakaram shadows Bhuneswari to convince her across all styles, but it backfires. So, vexed, Bhuvaneswari sets a deal with Diwakaram to get rid of him. She would give consent to their splice only if he did not utter a lie during this period, which ends on April 1, and the two signed the agreement.

The time starts, though Diwakaram thinks it quickly, which throws him into severe problems. He unveils everyone's no secrets, such as Bhagyam's amour to Ram Murthy, Chinna Rao's enticement of her to Bhagyam & his wives, and Murthy & Varalakshmi's chit-fund swindling, etc, which leads to harsh clashes. Still, people are too scared to question owing to Gopi. Above all, Diwakaram clears all the debts when Chinna Rao becomes a heart attack victim, and the doctor states that do not reveal it to him. Yet, Diwakaram speaks the truth, and Chinna Rao passes away.

The colony folks plot against Diwakaram and choose to seek revenge against him by starting a rift between him and Gopi. Just a day before the deal ends, Gopi wins the football trophy (by bootleg), and a celebration is arranged. On that occasion, the colony folks set up Diwakaram to display the facts regarding Gopi. However, he stands firm in his vow and opens up about Gopi's secrets - his wrong road winning, Bala's pregnancy & abortion, and his crimes including murder and counterfeiting. The Police apprehend Gopi but he is acquitted due to a lack of evidence. To get even, he locks up Diwakaram by exposing that he sells illicit films when Bhuvaneswari bails him, discerning his sincerity. Krupamani is conscious of the deal, and she pleads with Divakaram to flee, but he refuses. Sharma talks back off-guard concerning Sundar Kumar's murder, which Diwakaram taped.

Overhearing it, Gopi's sidekick notifies him who schemes to slay Diwakaram that night. Ergo, Gopi announces a reward to whoever lays hold of him in the colony. Hereupon, residents & Gopi's henchmen hunt Diwakaram. Being gravely injured, Krupamani takes him home. Suddenly, Gopi onslaughts when Krupamani stabs him to guard Diwakaram. Currently, Diwakaram lies by taking the crime on his behalf. At last, Bhuvaneswari admires him, affirming that he has won her heart despite losing the deal. Krupa Mani confesses the actuality, and Diwakaram releases nonguilty. Finally, the movie ends happily with him accessible from the agreement and Bhuvaneswari ready for their nuptial.

== Cast ==
- Rajendra Prasad as Divakaram
- Shobana as Bhuvaneswari
- Krishna Bhagavan as Gopichand
- Mallikarjuna Rao as Chinna Rao
- Rallapalli as Sharma
- Sakshi Ranga Rao as Murthy
- Pradeep Shakthi as V. P. Jaganatham, Bhuvaneswari's uncle
- Bheemaraju as Rama Murthy
- Kallu Chidambaram as Ragpicker
- Shubha as Dr. Krupamani, guardian of Divakaram
- Jayalalita as Bhagyam
- Jaya Vijaya as Bhuvaneswari's mother
- Y. Vijaya as Murthy's wife
- L.B. Sriram as Barber
- Kameswari Gudla as Chinna Rao's Second Wife

== Production ==
The film was shot in one location in two weeks.

== Soundtrack ==
April 1 Vidudala

Film score by Ilaiyaraaja
- Released: 1991
- Genre: Soundtrack
- Length: 25:09
- Label: Echo Audio
- Producer: Ilaiyaraaja

Ilaiyaraaja chronology
Aditya 369 (1991)	April 1 Vidudala (1991)	Chaitanya (1991)

Music was composed by Ilaiyaraaja. Music was released on Echo audio label. The song "Chukkalu Temmanna" was reused from Raja's own song "Chithirai Sevvanam", which was composed for Kaatrinile Varum Geetham (1978).

Track listing
No.	Title	Lyrics	Singer(s)	Length
1.	"Chukkalu Themanna Teesukurana"	Sirivennela Sitaramasastri	Mano, K. S. Chithra	5:09
2.	"Okkate Aasa"	Sirivennela Sitaramasastri	Mano, K. S. Chithra	4:43
3.	"Nijamante Nippe kaada"	Sirivennela Sitaramasastri	Mano	5:00
4.	"Ompula Vaikhari"	Sirivennela Sitaramasastri	S. P. Balasubrahmanyam, K. S. Chithra	5:04
5.	"Matante Matenanta"	Vennelakanti	S. P. Balasubrahmanyam, K. S. Chithra	5:00
Total length:				25:09

== Reception ==
K writing for Sakshi in February 2017, appreciated the writing of Vamsy and the performance of Rajendra Prasad. K noted the similarity between April 1 Vidudala and the American film Liar Liar (1997) which is also shares a similar plot point, where the protagonist who is habituated to lying starts speaking truth.
