= Simhachalam (film) =

- Theatrical release poster
- Directed by: Indra Kumar
- Written by: Indra Kumar
- Dialogue by: Posani Krishna Murali
- Produced by: Kanumilli Srinivasa Rao
- Starring: Srihari; Prakash Raj; Meena
- Cinematography: Dutt
- Edited by: Gowtam Raju
- Music by: Mani Sharma
- Production company: Chandrahasaha Cinema
- Release date: 8 August 2003
- Country: India
- Language: Telugu

Simhachalam is a 2003 Indian Telugu-language action drama film directed by Indra Kumar and starring Srihari, Prakash Raj and Meena. The film has the same storyline as Simhadri (2003), which released prior to this film.

== Cast ==
- Srihari as Simhachalam
- Prakash Raj as Dora Swamy Raju
- Meena as Simhachalam's wife
- Suresh
- Sunil
- Raja Ravindra
- Kota Srinivasa Rao
- Telangana Shakuntala
- Rallapalli
- Mallikarjuna Rao
- Narsing Yadav
- J. V. Ramana Murthi
- Nutan Prasad
- Venu Madhav
- Jhansi
- Nagineedu
- Kantha Rao
- L. B. Sriram
- Jenny
- Bandla Ganesh
- Hemanth Ravan as Seetharama Raju

== Soundtrack ==
The soundtrack was composed by Mani Sharma.

Track listing
No.	Title	Length
1.	"Doboochulaade Siggatatho"	4:37
2.	"Meru Parvatham"	4:30
3.	"Sokemo Adiripad"	4:22
Total length:		13:29

== Reception ==
Jeevi of Idlebrain.com rated the film 3 1/4 out of 5 and wrote that "This film starts on a routine note. The first half is average. Second half is good with interesting twists (thanks to Prakash Raj). The 'counseling episodes' by hero in the first half are good. However, there are many characters in this film that were left without giving them an ending". A critic from Sify wrote that "Srihari's new film Simhachalam is racy with a good screenplay and punchy dialogues".
