= Ladies Tailor =

- Theatrical release poster
- Directed by: Vamsy
- Written by: Tanikella Bharani (dialogues)
- Screenplay by: Vamsy; Tanikella Bharani; Vemuri Satyanarayana
- Story by: Vamsy
- Produced by: K. Sarada Devi; Sravanthi Ravi Kishore(presents)
- Starring: Rajendra Prasad; Archana
- Cinematography: Hari Anumolu
- Edited by: Anil Malnad
- Music by: Ilaiyaraaja
- Production company: Sri Sravanthi Movies
- Release date: 4 December 1986
- Running time: 154 mins
- Country: India
- Language: Telugu

Ladies Tailor is a 1986 Indian Telugu-language comedy film, produced by K. Sarada Devi under the Sri Sravanthi Movies banner, presented by Sravanthi Ravi Kishore and written and directed by Vamsy. It stars Rajendra Prasad and Archana, with music composed by Ilaiyaraaja.

The film was dubbed into Tamil under the same name. It was remade in Hindi in 2006 under the same title.

== Cast ==
- Rajendra Prasad as Sundaram
- Archana as Sujatha
- Rallapalli as Koyadora (soothsayer)
- Tanikella Bharani as Police
- Mallikarjuna Rao as Battala Satyam
- Subhalekha Sudhakar as Sitaramudu
- Pradeep Shakthi as Venkataratnam
- Karun as Srinivas
- Dham as Photographer Jembulingam
- Deepa as Daiya
- Sandhya as Neelaveni
- Y. Vijaya as Nagamani
- Prudhviraj

== Production ==
=== Development ===
Sravanthi Ravi Kishore along with his friends Thammudu Satyam and Vemuri Satyanarayana together formed a production company Sravanthi Film Arts. Ladies Tailor became company's first project.

=== Casting and filming ===
Archana whom initially auditioned for Vamsy's previous film Sitara was chosen as one of the lead actresses alongside Sandhya from Guntur and Deepa. For Tanikella Bharani's role, Vamsy's initial choice was Nutan Prasad however due to date issues, Bharani did the role instead. The film was mostly shot in and around Rajolu, Thatipaka, and Manepalli of West Godavari district.

== Soundtrack ==
The soundtrack was composed by Ilaiyaraaja and all lyrics were written by Sirivennela Seetharama Sastry. Songs were released through ECHO music label. The song "Ekkada Ekkada" was composed and recorded after it was picturised as opposed to the usual norm of shooting after the song got recorded.

Track listing
No.	Title	Singer(s)	Length
1.	"Porapatidhi"	S. P. Balasubrahmanyam, S. Janaki, Rajendra Prasad	4:02
2.	"Gopilola"	S. P. Balasubrahmanyam, S. P. Sailaja	4:22
3.	"Hayamma Hayamma"	S. P. Balasubrahmanyam, S. Janaki	4:24
4.	"Ekkada Ekkada"	S. P. Balasubrahmanyam, S.P. Sailaja	4:00
5.	"Vetaadande Ollokocchi"	Mano & Chorus	3:58
Total length:			22:46
