= Kannayya Kittayya =

- DVD cover
- Directed by: Relangi Narasimha Rao
- Written by: Diwakar Babu (dialogues)
- Screenplay by: Relangi Narasimha Rao
- Story by: Relangi Narasimha Rao
- Produced by: Gangula Indira
- Starring: Rajendra Prasad; Shobana; Aamani
- Cinematography: V. S. R. Swamy
- Edited by: D. Raja Gopal
- Music by: Vamsy
- Production company: Avanthi Avinash Arts
- Release date: 11 June 1993
- Running time: 145 mins
- Country: India
- Language: Telugu

Kannayya Kittayya is a 1993 Indian Telugu-language fantasy comedy film written and directed by Relangi Narasimha Rao. It stars Rajendra Prasad, Shobana, Aamani and music composed by famous Telugu film director Relangi Narasimha Rao. The film was recorded as Above Average at the box office.

== Plot ==
The film begins in a village where Kittayya, an advent devotee of Krishna, calls him Kannayya out of adoration. He constantly bars the barbarities of his malicious maternal uncle, Bangaraiah, as they have a family feud. Kittayya's mother, Janakamma, is sworn to knit Bangaraiah's daughter Saroja with him to hit her brother's conceit. Saroja, a vainglory, returns from abroad when Kittayya mocks her. As a vengeance, Bangaraiah publicly mortifies them with a slick trick. Janakamma attempts suicide out of shame when Kittayya oaths her to make Bangaraiah bow down. Annoyed, Kittayya accuses & rebukes the Lord, and the words reach Krishna / Kannayya in Vaikuntha. Ergo, Kannayya, identical to Kittayya, is alarmed and sets foot on the Earth. Kishtaiah becomes overwhelmed by seeing him, but he is of others' sight. From there, Kannayya guides Kittayya, and he makes separate steps to win Saroja's heart. Ultimately, Kittayya triumphs when he secures her against danger. Discerning it, Bangaraiah wiles various pawns, such as seeking to slay Kittayya, incriminating him in a so-called robbery, etc. At all stages, Kannayya shields him when Kittayya takes a vow from the Lord to stay in his attire until his wedlock to counterstrike Bangaraiah.

Meanwhile, Narada misinterprets the status quo and notifies the fairy story to Rukmini & Satyabhama that the Lord is wooing beauty on Earth. Hence, they land, dropping their divinity. After a few comic scenes, the Goddesses prejudge Kittayya for their husband by claiming themselves as his wives. Exploiting it, Bangaraiah raises a ruckus. Being incognizant of fact, Kittayya is furious and warns to slaughter the deities. Forthwith, Bangaraiah wiles to assassinate the women on Kittayya's account. Here, Kannayya gamely leads Kittayya to challenge his uncle, saying that if he could present them before villagers, Bangarayya should couple up Saroja with him. However, the boot is on the other foot because Rukmini & Satyabhama carry off Kannayya and seize him. Accordingly, Kittayya becomes a target of terrible torture on Earth. At last, Kittayya retrieves Kannayya with his idolization, proves non-guilty, and reforms Bangaraiah. Finally, the movie ends happily with Kittayya marrying Saroja and everyone declaring the existence of both Kannayya & Kittayya.

== Cast ==
- Rajendra Prasad as Kannayya (Lord Krishna) & Kittayya (Dual role)
- Shobana as Saroja
- Aamani as Rukmini
- Tulasi as Satyabhama
- Kota Srinivasa Rao as Bangarayya
- Brahmanandam as Narada
- Babu Mohan as Galigadu
- Rallapalli as Gopanna
- Sakshi Ranga Rao as Priest
- Annapoona as Janakamma
- Annuja as Chilaka
- Y. Vijaya as Bangarayya's wife

== Soundtrack ==
Kannayya Kittayya

Film score by Vamsy
- Released: 1993
- Genre: Soundtrack
- Length: 23:38
- Label: Supreme Music
- Producer: Vamsy

Vamsy chronology
Detective Narada (1993)	Kannayya Kittayya (1993)	Joker (1993)

Music composed by Vamsy. Music released on Supreme Music Company.

No.	Title	Lyrics	Singer(s)	Length
1.	"Andala Balathoti"	Vennelakanti	S. P. Balasubrahmanyam, Malgudi Subha	4:25
2.	"Bhama Alaka Ela"	Jonnavithhula	S. P. Balasubrahmanyam, Chitra	5:06
3.	"Chal Chal Gurram"	G.Viswanatha Sastry	S. P. Balasubrahmanyam, Chitra	4:57
4.	"Jhum Jhum Eda"	Jonnavithhula	S. P. Balasubrahmanyam, Chitra	5:04
5.	"Kondapalli Bomma"	Vennelakanti	S. P. Balasubrahmanyam, Chitra	4:06
Total length:				23:38

== Other ==
- VCDs and DVDs on - SHALIMAR Video Company, Hyderabad
