= Lawyer Suhasini =

- Theatrical release poster
- Directed by: Vamsy
- Written by: Tanikella Bharani(dialogues)
- Screenplay by: Mullapudi Venkata Ramana
- Story by: Mullapudi Venkata Ramana
- Produced by: D. S. Prasad
- Starring: Bhanu Chander; Suhasini; Rajendra Prasad
- Cinematography: G. V. Subba Rao
- Edited by: Anil Malnad
- Music by: S. P. Balasubrahmanyam
- Production company: Jaya Krishna Combines
- Release date: 6 March 1987
- Running time: 131 minutes
- Country: India
- Language: Telugu

Lawyer Suhasini is a 1987 Indian Telugu-language legal drama film directed by Vamsy. The film stars Bhanu Chander, Suhasini and Rajendra Prasad, with music composed by S. P. Balasubrahmanyam. It was released on 6 March 1987.

== Plot ==
Suhasini (Suhasini) is a poor woman who has a younger brother and two sisters along with an irresponsible drunk father. Her elder sister (Sangeetha) is the breadwinner of the family. Suhasini studies for a law degree with the hard-earned money of her sister and she prepares to marry an older person so that she would get a sum of 10,000 rupees. Shankar (Bhanuchander), an advocate incidentally arrives in this scene and finds her self-respect for Suhasini to be quite admirable. In a dramatic situation, he marries Suhasini in humanitarian value. Shankar's mother Lakshmi is an extremely money-minded woman and plans to get his son married for a high dowry. She gets shocked by this marriage and starts despising her daughter-in-law. Her husband (Prabhakara Reddy) is a very good gentleman who likes the good nature of Suhasini and her presence of mind. But the money-minded mother-in-law plans to create a rift between Suhasini and Shankar when the former goes on a tour to Delhi. The couple also has a son, but the mother-in-law is so evil that she does not allow Suhasini to look after her orphaned siblings when the elder sister dies. Things change in such a way that Suhasini had to leave the in-law's house to rescue her siblings. A lawyer friend Surya Prakash Rao (Rajendra Prasad) helps Suhasini in pursuing her law profession and their friendship is mistaken by Shankar. The rest of the film is about how Suhasini proves to be a responsible woman and a successful lawyer. The film ends on a happy note with the clearing of misunderstandings between the lead characters.

== Cast ==
- Bhanu Chander as Shankar
- Suhasini as Suhasini
- Rajendra Prasad as Surya Prakash Rao
- Prabhakar Reddy
- Pradeep Shakthi
- P. L. Narayana
- Mallikarjuna Rao
- Tanikella Bharani
- Dham
- S. Varalakshmi
- Sangeeta
- Sandhya

== Soundtrack ==
Soundtrack composed by S. P. Balasubrahmanyam. Lyrics were written by Sirivennela Seetharama Sastry.

Track listing
No.	Title	Singer(s)	Length
1.	"Saamajavaragamanaa"	S. P. Balasubrahmanyam, S. P. Sailaja	4:35
2.	"Emandii Illaalugaaruu"	S. P. Balasubrahmanyam, S. Janaki	4:41
3.	"O Raajaa Maharaajaa"	S. P. Balasubrahmanyam, S. P. Sailaja	4:50
4.	"Tholisaari Pooche"	S. P. Balasubrahmanyam, S. P. Sailaja	4:50
5.	"Levammaa Nidra Chaalinchi"	S. P. Sailaja	1:24
Total length:			20:20
