= Chettu Kinda Pleader =

- Theatrical release poster
- Directed by: Vamsy
- Written by: Tanikella Bharani (dialogues)
- Screenplay by: Vamsy
- Story by: Yandamuri Veerendranath
- Produced by: Nandigam Surya Ravindra
- Starring: Rajendra Prasad; Kinnera; Urvashi
- Cinematography: Hari Anumolu
- Edited by: Anil Malnad
- Music by: Ilaiyaraaja
- Production company: Siri Cine Chitra
- Release date: 16 February 1989
- Running time: 125 mins
- Country: India
- Language: Telugu

Chettu Kinda Pleader (transl. Jobless lawyer) is a 1989 Indian Telugu-language comedy thriller film directed by Vamsy. It stars Rajendra Prasad, Kinnera, Urvashi. The film was produced by Nandigam Surya Ravindra under the Siri Cine Chitra banner. The music was composed by Ilaiyaraaja. It is a remake of the Malayalam film Thanthram (1988).

== Plot ==
The film begins with Gopala Krishna, a self-made industrialist leading a happy life with his wife, Sujatha, and their son, Nani. Tragically, Gopala Krishna dies in an accident while returning home. During his funeral, Gopala Krishna's estranged father, Sarabhayya, arrives and attempts to gain control of the family’s wealth by challenging Sujatha’s authority. However, his efforts fail initially. Meanwhile, Balaraju, a timid and incompetent lawyer, frequently fumbles in court but is supported by his cross-cousin Krishna Kumari, who also serves as his assistant.

Sarabhayya files a lawsuit, claiming Gopala Krishna and Sujatha’s marriage was invalid, and seeks to oust Sujatha and Nani from their inheritance. Unable to find support elsewhere, Sujatha approaches Gopala Krishna’s friend, Advocate Basavaraju, who is coerced by Sarabhayya into withdrawing his assistance. Facing relentless harassment from Sarabhayya's thugs, Sujatha eventually seeks help from Balaraju, who agrees to take her case, believing it to be simple. However, Sarabhayya's men destroy crucial evidence of Sujatha's marriage, and Balaraju is attacked, prompting him to initially abandon the case. After being assaulted again, Balaraju resolves to fight for justice.

Sarabhayya’s side presents fabricated evidence, including claims that Sujatha was previously arrested for prostitution and institutionalized. Confronted by these allegations, Sujatha reveals her past: she was an orphan raised by an organization and, after becoming self-sufficient, worked at Gopala Krishna's company. There, she faced harassment from a manager, which led to her wrongful arrest and mental breakdown. Gopala Krishna helped her recover and later married her.

With this information, Balaraju begins an investigation, enlisting Krishna Kumari and a bouncer, Alex, to counter Sarabhayya's schemes. He uncovers crucial evidence, including testimony from Gopala Krishna's friend Bhagavantham. In court, Balaraju reveals that Sarabhayya is not Gopala Krishna’s biological father but his stepfather, who murdered Gopala Krishna's father and married his mother for the inheritance. He also exposes that Sarabhayya was behind Gopala Krishna’s death during a property dispute.

Sarabhayya flees and attempts to harm Sujatha and Nani but is thwarted by Balaraju, who ensures their safety and brings Sarabhayya and his accomplices to justice. The film concludes with the marriage of Balaraju and Krishna Kumari, bringing the story to a happy ending.

== Cast ==
- Rajendra Prasad as Balaraju
- Kinnera as Krishna Kumari / Krishna
- Urvashi as Sujatha
- Gollapudi Maruti Rao as Sarabhayya
- Sarath Babu as Gopala Krishna
- Pradeep Shakthi as Lawyer Basavaraju
- Mallikarjuna Rao as Yesupadam
- Tanikella Bharani as Paata Samanlavaadu
- Vijayachander as Father Cabriyal
- Raavi Kondala Rao
- Devadas kanakala as Bhagavantam
- Krishna Bhagavan as Aadibabu
- Arun Kumar as Raja Shekaram
- Bheema Raju as Inspector
- Anand Mohan
- C.H. Krishnamurthy
- Jeeva as Goon
- Baby Raasi as Nani

== Music ==
Chettu Kinda Pleader

Film score by Ilaiyaraaja
- Released: 1989
- Genre: Soundtrack
- Length: 18:31
- Label: ECHO Music
- Producer: Ilaiyaraaja

Ilaiyaraaja chronology
Indrudu Chandrudu (1989)	Chettu Kinda Pleader (1989)	Geethanjali (1989)

Music was composed by Ilaiyaraaja. Audio soundtrack was released on Echo Audio Company label. The song "Chalthika Naam Gaadi" was reused from "Chinnamani Kuyile" in Amman Kovil Kizhakale (1986).

No.	Title	Lyrics	Singer(s)	Length
1.	"Alli Billi Kalala"	Vennelakanti	SP Balu, Chitra	4:32
2.	"Chalthika Naam Gaadi"	Vennelakanti	SP Balu, Chitra	4:33
3.	"Jigi Jigi Jigija"	Jonnavithhula Ramalingeswara Rao	SP Balu, Chitra	4:34
4.	"Neerugari Paripoku"	Sirivennela Sitarama Sastry	SP Balu, Chitra	4:38
