= Hari Anumolu =

Indian cinematographer and director

- Occupations: Cinematographer; director
- Children: Shekar Chandra

Hari Anumolu is an Indian cinematographer and director who works in predominantly Telugu-language films. He is best known for his work in Mayuri (1985) and collaborations with Vamsy. Anumolu is known for his stint with working with debutante directors for which he worked with thirty. His work in the film Ganesh (2009) was praised by critics.

== Personal life ==
His son Shekar Chandra works as a music composer in Telugu films.

== Filmography ==
=== As cinematographer ===
Year	Film	Notes
1982	Manchu Pallaki	
1984	Swathi	
1985	Mayuri	
1986	Ladies Tailor	
1986	Swati	Hindi film
1986	Aalaapana	
1986	Aranyakanda	
1987	America Abbayi	
1988	Maharshi	
1988	Sri Kanaka Mahalakshmi Recording Dance Troupe	
1988	Varasudochhadu	
1989	Chettu Kinda Pleader	
1989	Swara Kalpana	
1991	Jaitra Yatra	
1991	Seetharamaiah Gari Manavaralu	
1993	Inspector Jhansi	
1993	Rowdy Mogudu	
1995	Lingababu Love Story	
1995	Real Hero	
1997	Priyaragalu	
1998	Padutha Theeyaga	
1999	Manasulo Maata	
1999	Anaganaga Oka Ammai	
2000	Nuvve Kavali	
2001	Preminchu	
2001	Student No. 1	
2002	Seshu	
2002	Nuvve Nuvve	
2003	Vijayam	
2003	Ela Cheppanu	
2004	Gowri	
2006	Premante Inte	
2007	Classmates	
2007	Veduka	
2008	Gamyam	
2009	Ganesh Just Ganesh	
2012	Onamalu	

=== As director ===
- Police Report (1989)

== Awards and nominations ==
Year	Award	Category	Work	Result	Ref.
1985	Nandi Awards	Best Cinematographer	Mayuri	Won	
