= Nandi Award for Best Audiographer =

Indian film award

The Nandi Award for Best Audiographer was commissioned in 1981. This is a list of the winners in this category and the films they have won for.

Year	Audiographer	Film
2016	Radhakrishna Eskala	Sarrainodu
2015	P. M. Satheesh	Baahubali: The Beginning
2014	Radhakrishna Eskala	Karthikeya
2013	Radhakrishna Eskala	Basanti
2012	Kadiala Devi Krishna	Eega
2011	Kadiala Devi Krishna	Badrinath
2010	Radhakrishna Eskala	Brindavanam
2009	Radhakrishna Eskala	Magadheera
2008	Radhakrishna Eskala; P. Madhusudhan Reddy	Arundhati
2007	Radhakrishna Eskala	Mantra
2006	Radhakrishna Eskala	Pokiri
2005	P. Madhusudhan Reddy	Jai Chiranjeeva
2004	P. Madhusudhan Reddy	Varsham
2003	P. Madhusudhan Reddy	Aithe
2002	P. Madhusudhan Reddy	Takkari Donga
2001	Kolli Rama krishna	Wife
2000	P.Madhusudhan Reddy	Vijayaramaraju
1999	P. Madhusudham Reddy	Samudram
1998	P. Madhusudhan Reddy	Choodalani Vundi
1997	M. Ravi	W/o V. Vara Prasad
1996	M. Ravi	Maina
1995	P. Madhusudhan Reddy	Gulabi
1994	Kolli Rama Krishna	Bhairava Dweepam
1993	Srinivas	Gaayam
1992	M. Ravi	Vasundhara
1991	Pandurangan	April 1 Vidudala
1990	A.R. Swaminadhan	Jagadeka Veerudu Athiloka Sundari
1989	A.R. Swaminadhan	Sutradharulu
1988	Pandurangan	Rudraveena
1987	A.R. Swaminadhan	Sruthilayalu
1986	Pandurangan	Sirivennela
1985	Yemmi	Mayuri
1984	S.P. Ramanadham	Sitaara
1983	A.R. Swaminadhan	Saagara Sangamam
1982	A.R. Swaminathan	Meghasandesam
1981	V. Sivaram	Tholi Kodi Koosindi
