= Lady Detective (TV series) =

Indian Telugu-language TV series

- Genre: Detective fiction, Thriller
- Screenplay by: Suman
- Story by: Guduru Viswanatha Sastry
- Directed by: Vamsy
- Starring: Uttara; Sakshi Ranga Rao; Potti Veerayya; Rama Prabha
- Opening theme: Lady Detective ... Ammo Yama Active
- Country of origin: India
- Original language: Telugu
- No. of seasons: 1
- No. of episodes: 72+

Production
- Producer: Ramoji Rao
- Production location: Hyderabad
- Running time: 18-24 minutes
- Production companies: Eenadu Television; Usha Kiran Movies

Original release
- Network: ETV
- Release: 1995 – 1997

Lady Detective is an Indian Telugu-language detective fiction television series directed by Vamsy. It aired on ETV from 1995 to 1997, with episodes broadcast every Thursday from 8:30 to 9:00 PM. The series features Uttara in the lead role as Sodhana, a private detective, supported by Sakshi Ranga Rao and Rama Prabha as her assistants. The show garnered significant popularity and was well received during its original run.

== Premise ==
The series follows Sodhana, a private detective who tackles various societal issues by investigating cases at a detective bureau. Each episode features a new case, with Sodhana assisted by two to three comedic characters: Baby, a female assistant dressed in a schoolgirl-style skirt; Bobby, a male assistant in a striped suit, tie, and hat; and a dwarf male assistant in a checkered shirt, tie, and hat. These assistants often create humorous situations by unintentionally complicating the investigations, adding a lighthearted element to the series.

== Cast ==
=== Main ===
- Uttara as Sodhana
- Sakshi Ranga Rao as Bobby
- Potti Veerayya
- Rama Prabha as Baby

=== Recurring ===
- Rajeev Kanakala as Gopal Varma
- Raja Ravindra as Ravi
- Jhansi as Roopa
- Sameer as Sekhar
- Ramjagan as Rajan
- Anitha Chowdary as Manju
- Maharshi Raghava as Sriram's father-in-law
- J. V. Somayajulu
- Ragini as Sriram's mother-in-law
- Junior Relangi as a marriage broker and a waiter
- Vankayala Satyanarayana
- K. K. Sharma
- Gadiraju Subba Rao
- Raghu Babu
- Badi Tataji

=== Guest ===
- Dharmavarapu Subramanyam (episode 24)
- Prudhvi Raj (episodes 71-72)
- Devadas Kanakala (episode 24)
- Rajitha (episode 1)
- Jenny (episode 45)
- Vizag Prasad (episode 46)
- Juttu Narasimham as Doctor (episode 4)

== Production ==
The serial was shot outdoors and some scenes were filmed indoors at the Ramoji Film City in Hyderabad. Nadiminti Narsinga Rao was one of the dialogue writers for the series.

== Music ==
The title track "Lady Detective.. Ammo Yama Active" was received well and was quite popular.

Lady Detective (Original Soundtrack)
No.	Title	Length
1.	"Lady Detective.. Ammo Yama Active"	1:44

== Reception ==
Lady Detective was originally broadcast every Thursday between 8:30 to 9:00 PM on ETV from 1996 to 1997. The serial received acclaim from critics and audience alike. Uttara's performance as the titular detective received praise.

== In popular culture ==
The title song of the serial was parodied in a deleted scene in the 2019 Telugu film Agent Sai Srinivasa Athreya.
