= W/o V. Vara Prasad =

W/O V. Varaprasad
- VCD cover
- Directed by: Vamsy
- Written by: Story & Dialogues: Krishna Bhagavaan
- Screenplay by: Vamsy
- Produced by: Ram Gopal Varma
- Starring: J. D. Chakravarthy; S. P. Balasubrahmanyam; Vineeth; Mallikarjuna Rao; Subbaraya Sharma; Avani
- Cinematography: M. V. Raghu
- Edited by: Bhanodaya
- Music by: M. M. Keeravani
- Distributed by: Varma Corporation
- Release date: 27 June 1997
- Country: India
- Language: Telugu

W/O V. Varaprasad is a 1997 Telugu romantic thriller film co-written and directed by Vamsy. Produced by Ram Gopal Varma, the film stars Vineeth and J. D. Chakravarthy.

== Cast ==
- Vineeth as Varaprasad
- J. D. Chakravarthy as Thyagaraju
- S. P. Balasubrahmanyam as Varaprasad's Grandfather
- Avani as Bhuvaneswari
- Mallikarjuna Rao
- Krishna Bhagavaan
- J. V. Ramana Murthi as Lawyer
- Suthivelu
- A.V.S
- Subbaraya Sharma
- Kallu Chidambaram
- Oru Viral Krishna Rao
- Gundu Hanumantha Rao
- Chitti Babu
- Rajeev Kanakala
- Isha Koppikar (special appearance in the song "Ekkadiki Nee Parugu")
- Alphonsa (special appearance in the song "Ekkadiki Nee Parugu")
- Uttara
- Poojitha
- Uma Sharma

== Soundtrack ==
The soundtrack was composed by M. M. Keeravaani and all lyrics were written by Sirivennela Seetharama Sastry.

Track list
| No. | Title | Singer(s) | Length |
|---|---|---|---|
| 1. | "Andam Emitante" | S. P. Balasubrahmanyam, K. S. Chithra | 5:28 |
| 2. | "Mosalu Mathlabulu" | S. P. Balasubrahmanyam | 4:47 |
| 3. | "Naa Kannulane" | S. P. Balasubrahmanyam, K. S. Chithra | 4:30 |
| 4. | "Peru Cheppave Papa" | Mano, K. S. Chithra | 4:18 |
| 5. | "Ekkadiki Nee Parugu" | S. P. Balasubrahmanyam, Sujatha, M. M. Srilekha | 5:28 |
| 6. | "Chakravarthi Babulaga" | Mano, Renuka | 4:45 |

== Reception ==
The film was reviewed by Zamin Ryot. A critic for Andhra Today wrote, "From a noted duo like Producer/director Ramgopal Verma and Vamsi, the former as an eminent director of national repute and the latter noted for his finesse, a movie like W/o V.Varaprasad is a big disappointment, to put it mildly".

== Awards ==
- Nandi Award for Best Audiographer - M. Ravi
