= Maharshi Raghava =

Indian actor

- Born: Raghava Gogineni; Tenali, Andhra Pradesh, India
- Occupation: Actor
- Years active: 1987–present
- Spouse: Mythrayee
- Awards: Nandi Awards

Raghava Gogineni, better known as Maharshi Raghava, is an Indian actor who works in Telugu films and television. Raghava acted in more than 170 films in various roles. He shot to fame as a lead actor with his first film Maharshi (1987), which gave him the moniker Maharshi. He is a recipient of two Nandi TV Awards.

== Personal life ==
Maharshi Raghava studied till tenth standard in Tenali, Thaluk High school. He also has stage experience. He played Mahatma Gandhi in a play called Gandhi Jayanthi. He visited the United States multiple times along with Murali Mohan, Nandamuri Balakrishna, and Paruchuri Brothers.

== Filmography ==
List of Maharshi Raghava film credits
Year	Film	Role
1987	Maharshi	Maharshi
1988	Nava Bharatham	
1988	Illu Illaalu Pillalu	
1988	Nyayam Kosam	Inspector Raghava
1989	Aarthanadam	Chanti
1990	Prananiki Pranam	Giri
1991	Prema Enta Madhuram	Chitti Babu
1991	Shatruvu	
1991	Chitram Bhalare Vichitram	Raghava
1991	Keechurallu	
1992	Hello Darling	
1992	Dabbu Bhale Jabbu	
1992	Chanti	Madman
1993	Jamba Lakidi Pamba	
1993	Matru Devo Bhava	Doctor
1994	Number One	
1995	Pokiri Raja	
1996	Nalla Pussalu	
1997	Subhakankshalu	Robert
1997	Korukunna Priyudu	
1997	Devudu	
1998	Suryavamsam	Diwakar Prasad
1999	Seenu	MD
1999	Ravoyi Chandamama	Meghana's brother
2000	Uncle	
2001	Ninnu Choodalani	
2005	Slokam	
2007	Athili Sattibabu LKG	
2008	Sangamam	

=== Television ===
Year	Title	Role	Network	Notes
1996–1997	Lady Detective		ETV	Episode 21
1997–1999	Anveshitha	Vidyadhar	ETV	
1997–2000	Ruthuragalu	Srinivas	DD Saptagiri	
2024 – 2026	Nuvvunte Naa Jathaga	Sathyam Master	Star Maa	

== Awards ==
Nandi TV Awards

- 1997: Best Villain for Naari Yaagam
- 1999: Special Jury Award – Actor for Puvvu
