= Sri Kanaka Mahalakshmi Recording Dance Troupe =

- DVD cover
- Directed by: Vamsy
- Written by: Tanikella Bharani
- Produced by: Dr. P. Ramesh Reddy; Dr. P. Vijayakumar Reddy
- Starring: Naresh; Madhuri
- Cinematography: Hari Anumolu
- Edited by: Anil Malnad
- Music by: Ilaiyaraaja
- Production company: Sri Teja Art Movies
- Release date: 1987
- Country: India
- Language: Telugu

Sri Kanaka Mahalakshmi Recording Dance Troupe is a 1987 Indian Telugu-language film directed by Vamsy, starring Naresh and Madhuri. The music was composed by Ilaiyaraaja.

== Plot ==
Papa Rao runs the Sri Kanakamahalakshmi Recording Dance Troupe, in Rajahmundry, Andhra Pradesh. Gopalam and Sita work as dancers in the troupe. Gopalam is a naive and timid man, who loves Sita, but lacks courage to reveal his feelings to her. Dorababu, another dancer in the troupe, lusts after Sita. How Gopalam gains confidence to reveal his feelings to Sita and keep Dorababu in check, forms the remainder of the story.

== Cast ==
- Naresh as Gopalam
- Madhuri as Sita
- Kota Srinivasa Rao as Papa Rao
- Tanikella Bharani as Dorababu
- Mallikarjuna Rao as Abbulu
- Rallapalli as Cylone Subbarao
- Nirmalamma as Paadi Sundaramma, Sita's grandmother
- Y. Vijaya as Anantha Lakshmi
- Bheemaraju as Gavarraju
- Dham
- Sandhya as Pattu Padmini
- Rambabu as N.T.R.
- Veerraju as A.N.R.
- Venkatesh as Chiranjeevi

== Production ==
The film was completed in 22 days.

== Soundtrack ==
All music is composed by Ilaiyaraja.

Track list
No.	Title	Lyrics	Singer(s)	Length
1.	"Nuvvuna"	C. Narayana Reddy	S. P. Balasubrahmanyam, S. Janaki	4:10
2.	"Eynadu"	Sirivennela Seetharama Sastry	S. P. Balasubrahmanyam, S. Janaki	4:32
3.	"Telisindile"	C. Narayana Reddy	S. P. Balasubrahmanyam, S. Janaki	4:03
4.	"Mallika Pogadaku"	Ilaiyaraaja, Vamsy	S. P. Balasubrahmanyam, S. Janaki	4:30
5.	"Siggestonda"	C. Narayana Reddy	S. P. Balasubrahmanyam, S. Janaki	3:47
6.	"Kalala"	Ilaiyaraaja, Vamsy	S. P. Balasubrahmanyam, S. P. Sailaja	4:51
7.	"Vennelai Padana"	Ilaiyaraaja, Vamsy	S. P. Balasubrahmanyam, S. Janaki	4:35
Total length:				30:31
