= Topi Raja Sweety Roja =

- Movie Poster
- Directed by: Dr. N. Siva Prasad
- Written by: Rajendra Kumar (dialogues)
- Screenplay by: Dr. N. Siva Prasad
- Story by: Dr. N. Siva Prasad
- Produced by: Dr. A. Vijayalakshmi
- Starring: Rajendra Prasad; Roja
- Cinematography: P. S. Prakash
- Edited by: Gowtham Raju
- Music by: Rajendra Prasad
- Production company: Sri Sai Madhavi Productions
- Release date: 1996
- Running time: 130 minutes
- Country: India
- Language: Telugu

Topi Raja Sweety Roja is a 1996 Indian Telugu-language comedy film and directed by Dr. N. Siva Prasad. It stars Rajendra Prasad, Roja with music composed by Rajendra Prasad.

== Cast ==
- Rajendra Prasad as Raja
- Roja as Roja
- Kota Srinivasa Rao as Kota
- Brahmanandam as Brahmam
- Babu Mohan as Bobby
- Mallikarjuna Rao as Gunapam
- A.V.S as Aadiseshu
- Suthi Velu as Father
- Rallapalli as Priest
- Narra Venkateswara Rao as Constable
- Padmanabham as Magician
- Peketi Sivaram as Magician
- Annapurna as Janakamma
- Jayalalita as Aadiseshu's sister
- Srilakshmi as Mandodari
- Y. Vijaya as Roja's mother
- Baby Disha

== Soundtrack ==
Topi Raja Sweety Roja

Film score by Rajendra Prasad
- Released: 1995
- Genre: Soundtrack
- Length: 23:49
- Label: Supreme Music
- Producer: Rajendra Prasad

Music composed by Rajendra Prasad. Music released on Supreme Music Company.

No.	Title	Lyrics	Singer(s)	Length
1.	"Topi Bhale Topi"	Dr. N.Siva Prasad	S. P. Balasubrahmanyam, Swarnalatha	4:51
2.	"Naa Pere Sweety Roja"	Vennelakanti	Chitra, Siva Prasad, Master Rakendu Mouli	4:40
3.	"Daruvesi Danchindamma"	Vedavyas	S. P. Balasubrahmanyam, Radhika	5:06
4.	"Alluku Pora"	Sahithi	Mano, Radhika	4:24
5.	"Yado Yado"	Vennelakanti	S. P. Balasubrahmanyam, Swarnalatha	4:48
Total length:				23:49
