= Ramjagan =

Indian actor

- Born: Ramjagan
- Occupation: Actor
- Years active: 1987 – present

Ramjagan is an Indian television, drama and film actor, who works in Telugu cinema.

== Filmography ==
1. Rowdy Police (1987)
2. Maharshi (1988)
3. Siva (1989)
4. Shiva (1990; Hindi)
5. Patha Basti (1995)
6. Ooriki Monagadu (1995)
7. Srikaram (1996)
8. Deyyam (1996)
9. Master (1997)
10. Pape Naa Pranam (1998)
11. Preyasi Rave (1999)
12. Annayya (2000)
13. Ori Nee Prema Bangaram Kaanu (2003)
14. Sriramachandrulu (2003)
15. Kaani (2004)
16. Shock (2006)
17. Bhagyalakshmi Bumper Draw (2006)
18. Nagaram (2008)
19. Mahatma (2009)
20. Money Money More Money (2011)
21. Sukumarudu (2013)
22. Masala (2013)
23. Race Gurram (2014)
24. Pratighatana (2014)
25. Next Nuvve (2017)
26. Oppanda (2022; Kannada)
27. The Paradise (2026)

=== Television ===
Year	Serial	Role	Channel
1995	Lady Detective		ETV
1995	Sneha		ETV
2012-2013	Anubhandalu	Chitti Babu	Gemini TV
2015-2017	Iddaru Ammayilu		Zee Telugu
2017-23	Kalyana Vaibhogam		Zee Telugu
2018- 2020	Rendu Rellu Aaru	Siddharth Varma	Gemini TV
2020–2025	Prema Entha Madhuram	Jhende	Zee Telugu

== Awards ==
- 2009 : Nandi Award for Best Supporting Actor - Mahatma
