= Preminchu Pelladu =

- Theatrical release poster
- Directed by: Vamsy
- Screenplay by: Ganesh Patro
- Story by: Jonnalagadda Rama Lakshmi
- Produced by: Ramoji Rao
- Starring: Rajendra Prasad; Bhanupriya
- Cinematography: M. V. Raghu
- Edited by: Anil Malnad
- Music by: Ilaiyaraaja
- Production company: Usha Kiran Movies
- Distributed by: Mayuri Films
- Release date: 30 August 1985
- Running time: 135 mins
- Country: India
- Language: Telugu

Preminchu Pelladu (transl. Love and marry) is a 1985 Telugu-language film directed by Vamsy. It stars Rajendra Prasad and Bhanupriya, with music composed by Ilaiyaraaja. It is produced by Ramoji Rao under the Usha Kiran Movies banner. The film marked the debut of Rajendra Prasad as a lead actor. It was a failure at the box office.

== Cast ==
- Rajendra Prasad as Rambabu
- Bhanupriya as Radha
- Satyanarayana as Kurmavataram
- Subhalekha Sudhakar as Babji
- Suthi Veerabhadra Rao as Raghava Rao
- Mallikarjuna Rao
- Rallapalli as Hanumantha Rao
- Hema Sundar as Subhadra's husband
- Bheemiswara Rao as Doctor
- Sattibabu as Rambabu's friend
- Dham as Compounder Appalakonda
- Tulasi as Saraswathi
- Radha Kumari as Rambabu's mother
- Anitha as Rukmini
- Kakinada Shyamala as Subhadra
- Dubbing Janaki as Urmila
- Y. Vijaya as Damayanthi

== Soundtrack ==
Preminchu Pelladu

Film score by Ilayaraja
- Released: 1985
- Genre: Soundtrack
- Length: 25:21
- Label: Echo Audio
- Producer: Ilayaraja

Ilayaraja chronology
Aalaapana (1985)	Preminchu Pelladu (1985)	Darja Donga (1985)

Music composed by Ilaiyaraaja. Lyrics were written by Veturi. Music released on Echo Audio Company.

S.No	Song title	Singers	length
1	"Ee Chaitra Veena"	S. P. Balasubrahmanyam, S. Janaki	5:10
2	"Gopemma Chethulo"	S. P. Balasubrahmanyam, S. Janaki	5:04
3	"Aade Paade"	S. P. Balasubrahmanyam, S. P. Sailaja	5:03
4	"Nirantharamu"	S. P. Balasubrahmanyam, S. Janaki	4:59
5	"Vayyari Godaramma"	S. P. Balasubrahmanyam, S. Janaki	5:05
