= Devadas Kanakala =

Indian actor (1945–2019)

- Born: 30 July 1945; Yanam, India
- Died: 2 August 2019 (aged 74)
- Occupations: Actor, director
- Spouse: Lakshmi Devi till 2018, her death
- Children: 2, including Rajeev
- Relatives: Suma (daughter-in-law)

Devadas Kanakala (30 July 1945 – 2 August 2019) was an Indian actor and director from Andhra Pradesh who predominantly appeared in Telugu-language films and TV shows. Rajnikanth, Chiranjeevi and Rajendra Prasad trained under him. He was an acting trainer.

He has written a book titled Abhinayam.

== Filmography ==
=== As a director ===
Year	Title	Notes
1978	Chali Cheemalu	
1980	O Intti Bagotham	
1980	Nijam	
1980	Nagamalli	
1982	Punya Bhoomi Kallu Terichinddi	

=== As an actor ===
Year	Film	Role	Notes
1969	Buddhimantudu		
1974	O Seeta Katha		
1976	Mangalyanaki Maromudi		
1976	Siri Siri Muvva		
1979	Gorintaku		
1982	Manchu Pallaki		
1982	Bhale Ammayilu		
1983	Raju Rani Jackie	Triple S	
1985	Aalaapana		
1986	Pasuputhadu		
1988	Nyayam Kosam	S. P. Devadas	
1989	Bhale Dampathlu		
1989	Chettu Kinda Pleader		
1990	Sahasa Putrudu		
1991	Adavi Diviteelu		
1991	Super Express	CBI Director	
1991	Vidhata	Sunnam Manikyala Rao	
1991	Gang Leader		
1991	Alludu Diddina Kapuram		
1993	Konguchaatu Krishnudu		
1994	Criminal		
1996	Hello Guru		
1998	Gamyam	Lawyer Parthasarathi	
2000	Ammo! Okato Tareekhu		
2000	Mee Aayana Jagratha		
2000	Chala Bagundi		
2001	Evadra Rowdy	Interviewer	
2001	Manasantha Nuvve		
2002	Okato Number Kurraadu		
2002	Sreeram		
2002	Nee Sneham		
2003	Sambhu		
2003	Anaganaga O Kurraadu		
2004	Pedababu		
2004	Malliswari	Lawyer	
2005	Dhana 51		
2006	Asadhyudu		
2007	Aata		
2008	Okka Magaadu		
2008	King		
2009	Josh		
2010	Subapradam		
2010	Enthiran		Tamil film
2013	Sukumarudu		
2011	Parama Veera Chakra		
2018	Bharath Ane Nenu		

=== Television ===
Year	Title	Role	Channel	Notes
1995 1997	Lady Detective		ETV	Episode 24
2001–2007	Amrutham	Parandamayya	Gemini TV	
2006–2008	Radha Madhu	Gopalam	Maa TV	Replaced by Raja Babu
