= Manchu Pallaki =

- Theatrical release poster
- Directed by: Vamsy
- Written by: Yandamuri Veerendranath (dialogues)
- Screenplay by: Vamsy
- Story by: S. Rajasekar
- Produced by: M. R. Prasad Rao
- Starring: Chiranjeevi; Suhasini; Rajendra Prasad
- Cinematography: Hari Anumolu
- Edited by: Anil Dattatreya
- Music by: Rajan–Nagendra
- Production company: Godavari Chitra
- Release date: 19 November 1982
- Running time: 132 minutes
- Country: India
- Language: Telugu

Manchu Pallaki (transl. Snow Palanquin) is a 1982 Indian Telugu-language film directed by Vamsy in his debut. The film stars Chiranjeevi, Suhasini, Rajendra Prasad and Sai Chand, with music composed by Rajan–Nagendra. It is a remake of the Tamil film Palaivana Solai (1981).

== Plot ==
Sekhar, Hari, Vasu, Kumar and Gandhi are unemployed youths living in a colony who are looking for jobs and are unable to make a living. Geeta moves into their colony with her father and everybody falls for her, one trying to make a fool of the other. They tease her, but she teaches them a lesson and later they become friends. Sekhar also likes her, but does not express his feelings. Geeta changes the lives of all of them by making them earn their living by using what they know. When Sekhar confesses his love to her, he learns that she has a terminal disease and will die soon. But before dying, Geeta helps Vasu by marrying his sister to Sekhar.

== Cast ==
- Chiranjeevi as Sekhar
- Suhasini as Geeta
- Rajendra Prasad as Hari
- Narayana Rao as Vasu
- Sai Chand as Kumar
- Girish Pradhan as Gandhi
- Sakshi Ranga Rao as Gita's father
- P. L. Narayana as Vasu's colleague
- Annapurna as Samalamma
- Bhimeswara Rao as Kumar's father
- Devadas Kanakala as Sekhar's colleague
- Mallikarjuna Rao as Film Director
- Master Ali

== Production ==
Manchu Pallaki, a remake of the 1981 Tamil film Palaivana Cholai, was the directorial debut of Vamsy who also wrote the screenplay. Suhasini was chosen to reprise her role from the original.

== Soundtrack ==
Music composed by Rajan–Nagendra.

S.No	Song title	Lyrics	Singers	length
1	"Neekosame"	Mailavarapu Gopi	S. P. Balasubrahmanyam	4:46
2	"Meghama"	Veturi	S. Janaki	4:59
3	"Pagalureyiloo"	Sri Sri	S. P. Balasubrahmanyam	4:45
4	"Manishe Manideepam"	Sri Sri	S. P. Balasubrahmanyam	4:34
