= Dabbu Bhale Jabbu =

- Directed by: Kapuganti Rajendra
- Written by: Visu
- Produced by: Allu Ramalingaiah
- Starring: Rao Gopal Rao; Gollapudi Maruthi Rao; Annapoorna; Maharshi Raghava; Sumalatha
- Music by: Gangai Amaran
- Release date: 19 September 1992
- Country: India
- Language: Telugu

Dabbu Bhale Jabbu is a 1992 Indian Telugu-language family drama film directed by K. Rajendra and produced by Allu Ramalingaiah. The cast includes Gollapudi Maruthi Rao, Rao Gopal Rao, Annapoorna, Maharshi Raghava, and Sumalatha. The film was a remake of the Tamil film Varavu Nalla Uravu (1990) which was based on the American film Make Way for Tomorrow (1937). The film received two Nandi Awards.

== Plot ==
Kutumba Rao believes that human relations are more important than money. He lives with family of two sons and two daughters. Kutumba Rao receives Rs.2,25,000 as retirement benefit. Every one of his sons and daughters wants a share of it. His son-in-law wants to start a business. Both of his sons wants to construct their own houses nearer to their offices. In exchange, they would give Rs.500 to their father. So he spends all of his retirement money and sells his own his house to satisfy his children.

Rao Gopal Rao had a bitter past and has a strong opinion against human relations. He thinks that money is more important than everything else in this world. His son (Raja) marries Hema, an orphan. He has a brother, Diwakar. He also behaves irresponsibly. He explains to her the incidents which changed his father and their family and hands over the responsibility of setting things right in his family. She does her level best to change their mindset. Diwakar fall in love with Lakshmi, daughter of Kutumba Rao.

Slowly, Kutumba Rao's children disown him because he is retired now and no longer earning. They treat their parents as their house maids. When Kutumba Rao protests, they want to share their parents. He learns of this, he argues with his elder son, and walks out of his house to go to the younger son's house. He faces the same fate there also. He abandons both his sons and moves to a small hut along with his wife and youngest daughter with the help of Rao Gopal Rao.

Understanding her father's situation, Lakshmi marries Diwakar so that her marriage would not be a burden for him. Fed up with the behavior of Rao Gopal Rao despite her best efforts to change him, Hema walks out of his home along with her husband. Diwakar also decides to live with his brother, recognizing the value of family. Finally, Rao Gopal Rao realizes his mistake and unites with his family.

Kutumba Rao sends legal notices to his sons to recover his money. His sons face severe warnings from their companies to settle the case outside court. They ask their mother to convince his father to withdraw the cases against them. Unable to convince him, she plans to commit suicide. But he thwarts her attempt by agreeing to withdraw his case against their sons. Leaving his house in a rage, he meets with an accident. Vasundhara realizes her mistake and does not allow her sons and daughter when they come to see their father in the hospital. They decide to leave everyone and live far away. But Rao Gopal Rao convinces them to pardon their children and unite them with his family.

== Cast ==
- Gollapudi Maruthi Rao as Kutumba Rao
- Rao Gopal Rao
- Annapoorna as Vasundhara, Kutumba Rao's wife
- Achyuth as Kutumba Rao's son
- Maharshi Raghava as Kutumba Rao's son
- Varalakshmi as daughter of Kutumba Rao
- Harita as daughter of Kutumba Rao
- Sumalatha as Hema
- Raja
- Raj Kumar as Diwakar
- Allu Rama Lingaiah
- Brahmanandam
- Jenny as Beggar
- Hema
- Juttu Narasimhan

== Soundtrack ==
Soundtrack was composed by Gangai Amaran. The song "Needari Neede" is based on Amaran's own Tamil song "Ponmaanai Thedi" from Tamil film Enga Ooru Rasathi.

- Nedari Neede - S. P. Balasubrahmanyam
- Vinava Kanava - K. S. Chithra
- Chakkadanala Maharaju - S. P. Balasubrahmanyam, K. S. Chithra, Swarnalatha
- Emayo Unnattundi - Mano, K. S. Chithra

== Awards ==
Nandi Awards - 1992

- Best Home Viewing Feature Film - Allu Ramalingaiah
- Special Jury Award - Annapoorna
