= Anaganaga Oka Ammai =

- Official poster
- Directed by: Ramesh Sarangan
- Produced by: Krishna Prasad
- Starring: Srikanth; Soundarya; Abbas; Poonam Singar
- Cinematography: Hari Anumolu
- Music by: Mani Sharma
- Production company: Sridevi Arts
- Release date: 2 September 1999
- Country: India
- Language: Telugu

Anaganaga Oka Ammai (transl. Once upon a girl) (also known as Anaganana O Ammai) is a 1999 Indian Telugu-language romantic drama film directed by Ramesh Sarangan and starring Srikanth, Soundarya, Abbas, Raghuvaran and Poonam Singar. The film was a box office hit with the producer going into debt.

== Cast ==
- Srikanth as Vishnu
- Soundarya as Sandhya
- Abbas as Satya
- Poonam Singar as Priya
- Raghuvaran as Bhavani Prasad
- Annapurna as Annapurna
- Chandramohan
- Brahmanandam
- M. S. Narayana
- Ali as Vishnu's friend
- Rallapalli
- Gautam Raju
- Sivaji Raja as Vishnu's friend
- Sudha
- Subbaraya Sharma
- Bandla Ganesh as Vishnu's friend
- Surya

== Soundtrack ==
Songs composed by Mani Sharma.

- "Swathi Chinuka" – Udit Narayan, Sujatha
- "Ulle Ulle Uyyalale" – S.P. Balasubrahmanyam
- "Kakinada College" – S.P.Balasubrahmanyam
- "Nena Nuvve Nena" – S.P. Balasubrahmanyam, Sujatha
- "Too Much Too Much" – Devi Sri Prasad, chorus

== Reception ==
Jeevi of Idlebrain.com opined that "If you are going to watch this film, my recommendation for you is to know the two line story of first half and watch the second half on the big screen. You will enjoy it to the hilt". A critic from Sify wrote that "Debutante director Ramesh Sarangan tries to bring in a whiff of fresh air into an otherwise routine love story by introducing a pager as the central character between two lovers!"

== Awards ==
Nandi Awards

- Best Female Dubbing Artist - Shilpa (for Soundarya)
