= Nippu Ravva =

- Theatrical release poster
- Directed by: A. Kodandarami Reddy
- Written by: Paruchuri Brothers
- Produced by: M. V. Srinivas Prasad
- Starring: Nandamuri Balakrishna; Vijayashanti
- Cinematography: S. Gopal Reddy
- Edited by: Gautham Raju
- Music by: Bappi Lahiri; Raj–Koti; A. R. Rahman (Score)
- Production company: Yuvarathna Arts
- Release date: 3 September 1993
- Running time: 131 minutes
- Country: India
- Language: Telugu

Nippu Ravva (transl. Fire Spark) is a 1993 Telugu-language action film, produced by M.V.Srinivas Prasad on Yuvarathna Arts banner and directed by A. Kodandarami Reddy. The film stars Nandamuri Balakrishna, Vijayashanti, and music composed by Bappi Lahiri & Raj–Koti, while the background score was composed by A. R. Rahman. Nippu Ravva and Bangaru Bullodu, also starring Balakrishna, were released on the same day and both ran for over 100 days. It was dubbed into Tamil and Hindi as Suriya and Mawaali Raaj, respectively. It was also the last collaboration to mark actors, Balakrishna and Vijayashanthi together after featuring in several films previously and this was their 17th last pair.

== Plot ==
The film begins with a doughty Suryam produced before the judiciary as a murder convict sentenced to 7 years. Right away, he absconds from prison and abducts a sports star, Vijaya, the sibling of local SP Indrani. Currently, he hides her in a remote forest area where its tribes regard him. Vijaya makes various attempts to escape but, fortuitously, is rescued by Suryam. Then, Vijaya understands his virtue, inquires about him, and he spins rearward. Suryam is a trade union leader at Balagam coal mines owned by a spiteful Balagam Dhanraj who suppresses the workers under his toe. Anyhow, Suryam always encounters his malpractices. The chief engineer & his family maintain a cordial relationship with him.

Once, the engineer detects that Godavari water will drown the mines and notifies Dhanraj that he keeps a deaf ear for his greed. He walks to shield the workers, but it is too late. The water floods the mines, endangering the lives of hundreds. Suryam succeeds in bailing out the miners he can when he files a case against Dhanraj and claims indemnity. During the tribunal, Dhanraj intrigues by assassinating the engineer via his sidekick Dasu. Plus, he makes workers accountable for the catastrophe and calls off the lawsuit. Be aware that Suryam chases Dasu when the wicked cop, SI Prabhakar, screens him with fake alibis. Suryam raises an interstellar movement that shakes the country, intensifying his hunger strike. To distract his initiation, Dhanraj's son Kumar drags Suryam's sister Bharati away and molests her. Ergo, Dhanraj orders to slay her, but Suryam defends when Dasu and imprisons him.

Presently, Suryam aims to knit Kumar with Bharati. Hearing it, Vijaya endears him and is determined to aid in his mission. As of today, Suryam's stand-off Indrani for Kumar instead of Vijaya, while swapping Kumar, skips in the verge. Meanwhile, Bharati conceives, and Indrani knows the injustice that happened to her. So, she proceeds legally for justice but fails, which besmirches Bharati. Now, Indrani & Vijaya support Suryam in seizing Kumar, and he moves to the forest. On the way, he attempts to kill Suryam, but he is guarded by him when he reforms. Now, Dhanraj onslaughts on the woods, and heavy action occurs. At last, Suryam ceases the baddies, and the court declares him guilty with a death sentence. Finally, the movie ends with Suryam stepping for his penalty.

== Cast ==
- Nandamuri Balakrishna as Suryam
- Vijayashanti as Vijaya
- Shobana as dancer (Special Appearance)
- Amrish Puri as Balagam Dhanraj
- Rao Gopal Rao as Labour Minister
- Allu Ramalingaiah as Lawyer Buildup Masthan Rao
- Kanada Prabhakar as S.I. Prabhakar
- Mohan Raj as Gundappa
- Nizhalgal Ravi as Engineer
- Babu Antony as Dasu
- Jaya Prakash Reddy as Labour Officer
- Raja Ravindra as Kumar
- Prasanna Kumar as Sudhakar
- Mallikarjuna Rao as Constable
- Babu Mohan as Koyadora
- Sakshi Ranga Rao as Coolie
- Chitti Babu as Constable
- Sujatha as Mahalakshmi
- Lakshmi as S.P.Indrani
- Geetha as Lawyer Gayatri
- Kasturi as Bharathi
- Shilpa as Labour Minister's daughter
- Y. Vijaya as Labour Minister's wife
- Baby Shamili as Engineer's daughter

== Soundtrack ==
Nippu Ravva

Soundtrack album by Bappi Lahiri and Raj–Koti
- Released: 1993
- Genre: Soundtrack
- Length: 33:33
- Label: Lahari Music
- Producer: Bappi Lahiri Raj–Koti

The songs featured in the film was composed by Bappi Lahiri with Raj–Koti composing only one song "Randi Kadilirandi". It was released by the Lahari Music Company.

Raj-Koti duo was initially signed on to compose the background score. They called in their former keyboardist A. R. Rahman (who had by then risen to fame in Tamil with Roja), for assistance. Nippu Ravva was delayed and when Rahman was called, Roja had not released. Rahman ended up doing a major part of the score and its programming and arrangement, Raj-Koti suggested Rahman himself be credited for the whole score. After delays, the film was released in 1993, by when Roja became a major musical success. The makers happily agreed to credit Rahman for the score due to his fame.

No.	Title	Lyrics	Singer(s)	Length
1.	"Time Enta"	Sirivennela Sitarama Sastry	S. P. Balasubrahmanyam	5:24
2.	"Kamuni Patnam"	Sirivennela Sitarama Sastry	S. P. Balasubrahmanyam, Chitra	5:08
3.	"Hai Shabba"	Sirivennela Sitarama Sastry	S. P. Balasubrahmanyam, Chitra	5:21
4.	"Raavayya Raavayya"	Sirivennela Sitarama Sastry	S. P. Balasubrahmanyam, Chitra	7:14
5.	"Gulebakavali Kavalikato"	Sirivennela Sitarama Sastry	S. P. Balasubrahmanyam, Chitra	5:02
6.	"Randi Kadili Randi"	Veturi	S. P. Balasubrahmanyam	5:15
Total length:				33:33

Hindi

1. " Gaal Gulaabi" - Suresh Wadkar, Kavita Krishnamurthy
2. "Mawali Raj Aa Gaya" - Suresh Wadkar
3. "Rang Rangeela Mausam Aaya" - Suresh Wadkar, Kavita Krishnamurthy
