= Rallapalli (actor) =

Indian actor (1945–2019)

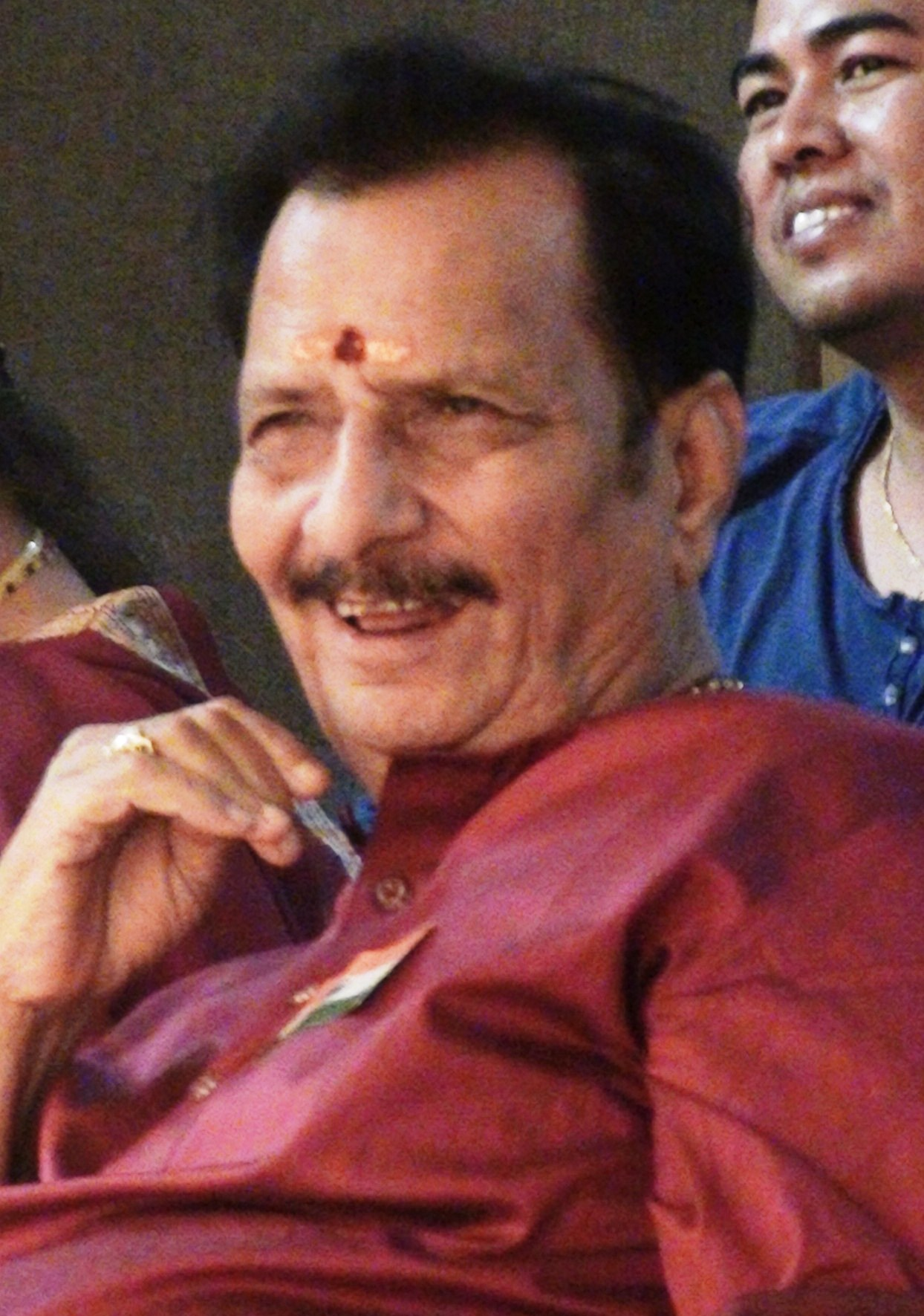
- Rallapalli in 2010
- Born: Rallapalli Venkata Narasimha Rao; 15 August 1945; Anantapur, Madras Presidency, British India
- Died: 17 May 2019 (aged 73); Hyderabad, Telangana, India
- Occupations: Actor, comedian

Rallapalli Venkata Narasimha Rao (15 August 1945 – 17 May 2019), popularly known as Rallapalli, was an Indian actor known for his works primarily in Telugu films and television. He won two state Nandi Awards.

== Life and career ==
Rallapalli Venkata Narasimha Rao was born in Anantapuramu, Andhra Pradesh on August 15, 1945.

He started off his career in 1960 as a theatre artist before marking his movie debut in 1974 with Sthree. He acted in about 850 films in a variety of roles, including that of a lead actor. He also worked as a staff artiste in Ministry of Information and Broadcasting. He played pivotal roles in films such as Bombay (1995) and Minsara Kanavu (1997) in Tamil.

== Death ==
Rallapalli died on 17 May 2019 at Maxcure Hospital, Hyderabad following ill health.

== Filmography ==
=== Telugu films ===
List of Telugu films and roles
Year	Title	Role	Ref.
1973	Stree		
1976	Oorummadi Brathukulu		
1976	Alludochadu	Ramanatham	
1978	Chali Chemmalu		
1979	Kukka Katuku Cheppu Debba		
1979	Kanchiki Cherani Katha		
1979	Toorpu Velle Railu	Sivudu	
1980	Kottapeta Rowdy		
1980	Badai Basavayya	Himself	
1981	Seethakoka Chiluka		
1981	Tyagayya		
1981	Prema Natakam	Dushyanthudu	
1981	Jeevitha Ratham	Krishna's friend	
1981	Jagamondi	Narayana	
1981	Pedala Brathukulu		
1982	Subhalekha	Gurunadham	
1982	Jagannatha Rathachakralu	Appa Rao	
1982	Kayyala Ammayi Kalavari Abbayi	Jogarao	
1982	Sitadevi		
1982	Krishnavataram		
1982	Andagaadu		
1982	Prathikaram	Sanyasi	
1982	Pralaya Rudrudu	Ramadasu	
1983	Khaidi	Sarma	
1983	Mugguru Ammayila Mogudu	Joginatham	
1983	Simhapuri Simham		
1983	Neti Bharatam		
1983	Rendu Jella Sita	Appalakonda	
1983	Ikanaina Marandi		
1983	Shivudu Shivudu Shivudu		
1983	Aalaya Sikharam		
1983	Mantri Gari Viyyankudu		
1983	Abhilasha	Vishnu Sharma	
1984	James Bond 999	Arumugam	
1984	Rustum		
1984	Kondaveeti Nagulu	'Saara' Surigadu	
1984	Pralaya Simham		
1984	Seethamma Pelli		
1984	Kanchu Kagada		
1984	Srivariki Premalekha	Saranga Ramudu/; Saaraa	
1984	Padmavyooham		
1984	Sitaara		
1984	Srimathi Kaavali		
1985	Anveshana	Paandu	
1985	Pratighatana		
1985	Babai Abbai		
1985	Edadugula Bandham		
1985	Bhale Thammudu		
1985	Mayaladi	Lavanya Murthy	
1985	Maharaju		
1985	Nerasthudu		
1985	Pelli Meeku Akshintalu Naaku		
1985	Kanchu Kavacham		
1985	Kongumudi	Lottala Apparao	
1985	Sri Katna Leelalu	S.I. Yadagiri	
1985	Preminchu Pelladu		
1985	Bangaru Chilaka	Abbulu	
1985	Terror	Thippadu	
1985	Jwala		
1985	Aalapana		
1985	Srivaru	Kanakeswara Rao	
1986	Krishna Garadi	Venkatasamy	
1986	Vijrumbhana		
1986	Adavi Raja	Simham	
1986	Pavitra		
1986	Kaliyuga Pandavulu		
1986	Chadastapu Mogudu		
1986	Brahma Rudrulu		
1986	Kondaveeti Raja		
1986	Patnam Pilla Palletoori Chinnodu		
1986	Magadheerudu		
1986	Chaitanyam		
1986	Prathidwani		
1986	Aadapaduchu		
1986	Rendu Rellu Aaru		
1986	Aranyakanda	Chinna Bukutha	
1986	Kashmora	Santana Pakir	
1987	Veera Pratap	Rangadu	
1987	Aha Naa-Pellanta!		
1987	Sardar Krishnama Naidu	Rangachari	
1987	Prema Samrat	Gurunatham	
1987	Alludu Kosam		
1987	Chinnari Devatha	Sub-Inspector Raju	
1987	Kirayi Dada		
1987	Agni Putrudu	Narahari	
1987	Sankeerthana		
1987	Shri Kanakamalaxmi Recording Dance Troupe	Ceylon Subba Rao	
1987	Bhale Mogudu	Simhachalam	
1987	Raaga Leela		
1988	Maharajasri Mayagadu		
1988	August 15 Raatri		
1988	Sagatu Manishi		
1988	Ukku Sankellu		
1988	Nava Bharatam		
1988	Menamama	M.S.M. Hanumantha Rao	
1988	Station Master		
1988	Raktha Thilakam		
1988	Yuddha Bhoomi		
1988	Nyayaniki Sankellu		
1988	Inspector Pratap		
1988	Jeevana Jyothi		
1988	Collector Vijaya		
1988	Jeevana Ganga		
1988	Maa Inti Maharaju		
1989	Yamapasam		
1989	Swarakalpana		
1989	Dhruva Nakshatram		
1989	Agni		
1989	Bharatha Nari		
1989	Mamathala Kovela		
1989	Bhooporatam		
1989	Vintha Dongalu	S.I. Dastagiri	
1989	Police Report		
1989	Chinnari Sneham		
1989	Prema		
1989	Bamma Maata Bangaru Baata		
1989	Mouna Poratam		
1989	Bava Bava Paneeru	Joginadham	
1989	Oorantha Golanta	Silver Jubilee Surya Rao	
1990	Mahajananiki Maradalu Pilla		
1990	Adavi Diveelu		
1990	Neti Charitra	Gurupadam	
1990	Rowdyism Nasinchali		
1990	Adadhi		
1990	Kadapa Reddamma		
1991	Prema Entha Madhuram		
1991	Coolie No. 1		
1991	Kalikalam		
1991	Parishkaram		
1991	Police Encounter	Maalokam	
1991	Ramudu Kadhu Rakshasudu		
1991	Mugguru Attala Muddula Alludu		
1991	April 1 Vidudala	Sarma	
1991	Surya IPS		
1992	Drohi	Hotel Receptionist	
1992	Antham	Hotel Receptionist	
1992	Brundavanam	Jeedimetla Zamindar	
1992	Attasommu Alludu Danam		
1992	Donga Police		
1992	Sahasam		
1992	Detective Narada		
1992	Hello Darling		
1993	Srinadha Kavi Sarvabhowmudu		
1993	Kannayya Kittayya		
1993	Alibaba Aradajanu Dongalu		
1993	Asale Pellaina Vaani		
1993	Jeevana Vedam		
1993	One By Two		
1993	Jeevithame Oka Cinema		
1993	Vintha Kodallu		
1993	Major Chandrakanth		
1993	Joker		
1993	Kunti Putrudu		
1993	Ish Gup Chup		
1993	Allari Alludu		
1994	Super Police	Pothuraju	
1994	Allari Police	Ralla Panthulu	
1994	Bobbili Simham		
1994	Bangaru Mogudu		
1994	Kishkindha Kanda		
1994	M. Dharmaraju M.A.		
1994	President Gari Alludu	Bhupathi Rayudu's uncle	
1994	Prema & Co		
1995	Ghatothkachudu		
1995	Street Fighter	Postman	
1995	Madhya Taragati Maha Bharatnam		
1995	Adavi Dora		
1995	Badilli		
1995	Mayadari Kutumbam		
1995	Sankalpam		
1995	Lingababu Love Story	Velu Pille	
1995	Subha Sankalpam	Bheema Raju	
1996	Vinodam		
1996	Neti Savithri	Gajendra	
1996	Rayudugaru Nayudugaru		
1996	Oho Naa Pellanta		
1996	Little Soldiers		
1996	Gunshot		
1996	Ladies Doctor		
1996	Topi Raja Sweety Roja		
1996	Dharma Chakram	Anjibabu	
1997	Gokulamlo Seetha		
1997	Pattukondi Chuddam		
1997	Osi Naa Maradala		
1997	Thoka Leni Pitta		
1997	Vammo Vatto O Pellaamo		
1997	Bobbili Dora		
1997	Aahwanam		
1997	Nayanamma		
1997	Priyamaina Srivaru		
1997	Mama Bagunnava		
1998	Pandaga		
1998	Chandralekha		
1998	Yuvarathna Rana		
1998	Eashwar Alla		
1998	O Panaipothundi Babu	Ram and Laksman's father	
1999	Anaganaga Oka Ammai		
1999	Hello...Yama!	Producer	
2000	Chitram		
2000	Kalisundam Raa	Govindu	
2001	Budget Padmanabham	Lawyer	
2001	Ninnu Choodalani		
2001	Khaki Chokka		
2001	Narahari		
2001	Nuvvu Nenu		
2001	Veedekkadi Mogudandi		
2001	Muthyam		
2001	Hanuman Junction		
2002	Anveshana	Vamsy's father	
2002	Jatheeya Pathakam		
2002	Bharata Simha Reddy		
2002	Friends		
2002	Jayam		
2003	Simhachalam	M.L.A.	
2003	Sambaram		
2003	Praanam		
2003	Simhadri		
2003	Donga Ramudu and Party		
2003	Nijam	Butcher	
2003	Kabirdas		
2004	Aaptudu	Resident	
2004	Mr & Mrs Sailaja Krishnamurthy		
2005	Athadu		
2005	Narasimhudu		
2005	Avunanna Kaadanna		
2005	Radha Gopalam		
2005	Modati Cinema		
2005	Sankranthi		
2005	Dhairyam		
2005	Naa Alludu		
2005	Friendship		
2005	Kshanikam		
2006	Veedhi		
2006	Asthram		
2006	Veerabhadra		
2007	Mantra		
2007	Sri Mahalakshmi		
2008	Ankusam		
2008	Kathanayakudu		
2008	Adhyakshaa		
2008	Maga Simham		
2008	Donga Sachinollu		
2008	Sundarakanda		
2009	Shh...		
2009	Vengamamba		
2009	Oy!		
2009	Mitrudu		
2009	Sontha Ooru		
2010	Subhapradam		
2010	1940 Lo Oka Gramam		
2010	Dammunnodu		
2011	Kodipunju		
2011	Gangaputrulu		
2014	Laddu Babu		
2015	Bale Bale Magadivoy		
2017	Duvvada Jagannadham		
2018	Pantham		

=== Tamil films ===
List of Tamil films and roles
Year	Title	Role	Notes and Ref.
1988	Veedu	Manager	
1995	Bombay	Transgender	
1997	Minsara Kanavu	Amalraj's servant	
1998	Thayin Manikodi	Dubbing producer for Shilpa Kumar's film	Uncredited role

Dubbing artist

- Y. G. Mahendran - Surya Chandra, Ajatha Satruvu

== Awards ==
Nandi Awards

- Best Male Comedian – Patnam Pilla Palletoori Chinnodu (1986)
- Best Male Comedian – Jeevana Jyothi (1988)
