= Joker (1993 film) =

- Movie Poster
- Directed by: Vamsy
- Written by: V. Anandashankaram (dialogues)
- Screenplay by: Vamsy
- Story by: Shaji Kailas
- Produced by: P. Pattabhi Rama Rao; M. Lakshman Kumar Chowdary; Gottimukkala Padma Rao (presents)
- Starring: Rajendra Prasad; Vani Viswanath; Baby Shamili
- Cinematography: Suresh
- Edited by: Uma Shankar Babu
- Music by: Vamsy
- Production company: Rakesh Productions
- Release date: 16 April 1993
- Running time: 131 mins
- Country: India
- Language: Telugu

Joker is a 1993 Indian Telugu-language comedy film produced by P. Pattabhi Rama Rao and M. Lakshman Kumar Chowdary under the Padma Priya Arts banner and directed by Vamsy. It stars Rajendra Prasad, Vani Viswanath, Baby Shamili and music also composed by Vamsy. The film is a remake of the Malayalam movie Kilukkampetti (1991), which was later remade as Hindi movie Pyaar Impossible! (2010). The film was recorded as a hit at the box office.

== Plot ==
Balaji (Rajendra Prasad) is a successful architect in a company named PADGRO, based in Hyderabad. He is known to be a womanizer who traps women clients in his projects. His company's Tirupati branch was not doing well and the company relocated him to Tirupati to improve things. He was supposed to replace his equivalent in Kochi named Usha Rani (Vani Viswanath). Usha Rani wasn't happy about the company's decision: She didn't want to move out of Tirupati and objected. Balaji understands the office situation, and decides to talk to Usha Rani in person.

Usha Rani is living with her eight-year-old daughter Apple (Baby Shamili). She is very naughty and Usha Rani is not able to get a caretaker as no one is able to handle her. Balaji falls in love with Usha Rani after seeing her in a shopping mall. He learns from his friend Subbaraju that Usha Rani is in search of a caretaker. Balaji reaches Usha Rani's home and takes up the job under the name of Joker with the intention of getting Usha Rani to love him.

What follows is funny situations where Balaji has to take care of the girl, cook for the family and kids, and hide himself from those at his office. Eventually Usha Rani goes to Balaji's house to request him not to take charge in Tirupati and, on seeing him, understands that he had tricked her, as his usual habit and brushes off his explanation of why he pretended to be joker. Disappointed, Balaji resigns from his job and appears to have gone back to Hyderabad. Usha Rani goes back to her office and informs manager Murthy that she will be resigning from her job and doesn't want to work in a place which supports people like Balaji. Murthy then explains that though he initially opined that Balaji was a womanizer and a characterless fellow, he has changed in the process of gaining Usha Rani's approval and that he got very attached to Apple in the last few days he had spent with her. Usha Rani starts to understand Balaji's love and feels sad. Upon reaching her home, she finds that Balaji is back again as Joker. Thus the movie ends on a happy note.

== Cast ==
- Rajendra Prasad as Balaji / Joker
- Vani Viswanath as Usha Rani
- Jaggayya as Manager B. S. Murthy
- Rallapalli as Manager Lakshmi Narayana
- Mallikarjuna Rao as Subbaraju
- Sivaji Raja as K. C. Reddy
- Sakshi Ranga Rao as David
- Kallu Chidambaram
- Jayalalita as Vijayalakshmi
- Abhilasha as Luisa
- Rekha as Kantham
- Baby Shamili as Apple

== Soundtrack ==
Joker

Film score by Vamsy
- Released: 1993
- Genre: Soundtrack
- Length: 27:04
- Label: AKASH Audio
- Producer: Vamsy

Vamsy chronology
Kannayya Kittayya (1993)	Joker (1993)	Prema & Co (1994)

Music was composed by Vamsy. Lyrics were written by Gurucharan. The lyrics of the song Repanti Rupam Kanti from Manchi Chedu (1953) by Acharya Aatreya were largely used in this movie. Music released on AKASH Music Company.

No.	Title	Singer(s)	Length
1.	"Chamaku Chamaku"	S. P. Balasubrahmanyam, Chitra	4:13
2.	"Bandira Poolabandira"	S. P. Balasubrahmanyam, Chitra, Malgudi Subha	3:48
3.	"Repanti Roopamkanti"	S. P. Balasubrahmanyam, Chitra	4:33
4.	"Andala Bhama"	S. P. Balasubrahmanyam, Chitra, Malgudi Subha	3:29
5.	"Paala Navvulalona"	S. P. Balasubrahmanyam	4:03
6.	"Puchina Taralu"	S. P. Balasubrahmanyam, Chitra	4:34
7.	"Swagathamu"	Chitra	1:09
Total length:			27:04
