= Detective Narada =

- Theatrical release poster
- Directed by: Vamsy
- Written by: Krishna Bhagavan; Vamsy (dialogues)
- Screenplay by: Vamsy
- Story by: Vamsy
- Produced by: D. Sudhakar Raj
- Starring: Mohan Babu; Mohini
- Cinematography: M. V. Raghu
- Edited by: A. Sreekar Prasad
- Music by: Ilaiyaraaja
- Release date: 1992
- Country: India
- Language: Telugu

Detective Narada is a 1992 Telugu-language comedy film directed by Vamsy. It stars Mohan Babu and Mohini, with music composed by Ilaiyaraaja.

== Plot ==
Narada is a private detective who is hired to solve the mystery behind Nirosha's pregnancy.

== Cast ==
- Mohan Babu as Narada
- Mohini as Sharada
- Nirosha
- Jaggayya
- Mallikarjuna Rao as Jantar Mantar
- Sakshi Ranga Rao
- Rallapalli
- Prasad Babu
- Krishna Bhagavan
- Jayalalita
- Sivaji Raja
- Y. Vijaya
- Sandhya Rani
- Kaikala Satyanarayana

== Soundtrack ==
Music is released on LEO Audio Company.

All music is composed by Ilaiyaraaja.

No.	Title	Singer(s)	Length
1.	"Prema Yathralaku Brundavanamu"	S. P. Balasubrahmanyam, Chitra	5:10
2.	"Jhummani Thummedha"	S. P. Balasubrahmanyam, Chitra	4:55
3.	"Lingu Litukula"	S. P. Balasubrahmanyam	4:49
4.	"Kilakilamani"	S. P. Balasubrahmanyam, Chitra	5:00
5.	"Kotha Pittaro Kokko"	S. P. Balasubrahmanyam, S. Janaki	4:56
