= Raja Ravindra =

Indian Telugu film actor

- Born: Ramesh Dantuluri; Bhimavaram, Andhra Pradesh, India
- Other name: Raja Raveendar
- Education: B. Com
- Occupations: Actor, Producer
- Years active: 1986–present
- Spouse: Venkata Rama Devi
- Children: 2

Raja Ravindra is an Indian actor and producer predominantly appears in Telugu films and television serials. Apart from Telugu films, he has acted in several Tamil films and a few Kannada and Malayalam movies. He started his career with TV serials and entered into films.

== Early life ==
His real name was Ramesh Danthuluru, but he changed it to Raja Ravindra because there were already many people with that name in the film industry. He stated that before getting into filmmaking, he was interested in marketing; he therefore worked day and night in a stationery shop owned by his uncle, and then completed his higher education at university in the evenings.

During his workdays at the stationery shop, his younger brother noticed his interest in dance and sent him to Chennai to train. Later, he gradually sought opportunities and achieved a certain level of success despite some difficulties.

== Career ==
He started out as an actor, then distinguished himself as a manager. Raja Ravindra’s acting career spans several decades, and he has acted in a variety of roles across different genres. He’s known for his versatility and the ability to portray diverse characters. After acting in films like Pedarayudu (1995), he ventured into film production and dates management of heroes.

Raja Ravindra collobared with director K. S. Ravikumar and R. B. Choudary productions such as Pondatti Rajyam (1992), Gokulam (1993), Purusha Lakshanam (1993), Chinna Madam (1994), Nattamai (1994), Suryavamsam (1998), Jolly (1998), Padayappa (1999), Seenu (1999) and Priyamaina Neeku (2001).

== Filmography ==
=== Telugu ===
- Yamudiki Mogudu (1988)
- Neti Charitra (1990) as Ramesh
- Sarpayagam (1991)
- Mondi Mogudu Penki Pellam (1992)
- Nippu Ravva (1993)
- Sabash Ramu (1993)
- Maro Quit India (1993)
- Aadarsham (1993)
- Pacha Thoranam (1994)
- Bhale Pellam (1994)
- Number One (1994)
- Pedarayudu (1995)
- Telugu Veera Levara (1995) as Ravindra
- Aunty (1995)
- Real Hero (1995)
- Vajram (1995)
- Akkada Ammayi Ikkada Abbayi (1996)
- Pelli Sandadi (1996)
- Family (1996)
- Kuturu (1996)
- Muddula Mogudu (1997)
- Pelli Sandadi (1997)
- Bobbili Dora (1997)
- Maa Nannaku Pelli (1997)
- Suryavamsam (1998)
- Suprabhatam (1998)
- Pelli Peetalu (1998)
- Sri Ramulayya (1998)
- Kodukulu (1998)
- Seenu (1999)
- Manasunna Maaraju (2000)
- Jayam Manadera (2000)
- Kalisundam Raa (2000)
- Kodanda Ramudu (2000)
- Pelli Sambandham (2000)
- Mrugaraju (2001)
- Priyamaina Neeku (2001)
- Veedekkadi Mogudandi! (2001)
- Parasuram (2002)
- Indra (2002)
- Kalyana Ramudu (2003)
- Tagore (2003)
- Simhachalam (2003)
- Chanti (2004)
- Sakhiya (2004)
- Bhadra (2005)
- Jagapati (2005)
- Shock (2006)
- Desamuduru (2007)
- Baladur (2008)
- Swagatam (2008)
- Bujjigadu (2008)
- Idi Sangathi (2008)
- Homam (2008)
- Neninthe (2008)
- Neramu Siksha (2009)
- Anjaneyulu (2009)
- Amaravathi (2009)
- Dasanna (2010)
- Adhurs (2010)
- Mirapakay (2011)
- Katha Screenplay Darsakatvam Appalaraju (2011)
- Mr. Perfect (2011)
- Uu Kodathara? Ulikki Padathara? (2012)
- Srimannarayana (2012)
- Seethamma Vakitlo Sirimalle Chettu (2013)
- Rough (2014)
- Bhimavaram Bullodu (2014)
- Dohchay (2015)
- Moodu Mukkallo Cheppalante (2015)
- Pandaga Chesko (2015)
- Dynamite (2015)
- Rudhamadevi (2015)
- Oopiri (2016)
- 2 Countries (2016)
- Seethamma Andalu Ramayya Sitralu (2016)
- Ekkadiki Pothavu Chinnavada (2016)
- Manalo Okkadu (2016)
- Rojulu Marayi (2016)
- Sathamanam Bhavati (2017)
- Keshava (2017)
- Andhhagadu (2017)
- London Babulu (2017)
- Achari America Yatra (2018)
- Brand Babu (2018)
- Lover (2018)
- Raju Gadu (2018)
- Oh! Baby (2019)
- Evaru (2019)
- Gaddalakonda Ganesh (2019)
- Oorantha Anukuntunnaru (2019)
- Arjun Suravaram (2019)
- Raahu (2020)
- Orey Bujjiga (2020)
- Power Play (2021)
- Mosagallu (2021)
- Ardha Shathabdham (2021) as Veeranna
- Mugguru Monagallu (2021) as ACP Damodar
- Crazy Uncles (2021) as Raju
- The Rose Villa (2021)
- Ippudu Kaaka Inkeppudu (2021)
- DJ Tillu (2022)
- Son of India (2022)
- Acharya (2022) as Basava's Henchmen
- Bujji Ila Raa (2022)
- Ammu (2022)
- Thaggedele (2022)
- Boyfriend for Hire (2022)
- Lucky Lakshman (2022) as MLA
- Ramabanam (2023)
- Mistake (2023)
- Mr. Pregnant (2023)
- Month of Madhu (2023)
- My Name Is Shruthi (2023)
- Spark Life (2023)
- Sarangadhariya (2024) as Krishna Kumar
- Purushothamudu (2024)
- Tiragabadara Saami (2024)
- 28 Degree Celsius (2025)
- Bhairavam (2025)
- Show Time (2025)
- Chiranjeeva (2025)
- Honey (2026)
- The Paradise (2026)
- Ranabaali (2026)

=== Tamil ===
- Pondatti Rajyam (1992)
- Gokulam (1993)
- Madhumathi (1993)
- Sabash Babu (1993)
- Purusha Lakshanam (1993)
- Chinna Madam (1994)
- Nattamai (1994)
- Ungal Anbu Thangachi (1994)
- Pudhalvan (1997)
- Jolly (1998)
- Adutha Kattam (1999)
- Padayappa (1999)
- Nepali (2008)
- Moone Moonu Varthai (2015)
- Thozha (2016)
- Kannitheevu (2023)
- Kaalidas 2 (2026)

=== Other languages ===
- Sooryavansham (1999) (Hindi)
- Ouija (2015) (Kannada)

=== Television ===
- Vasundhara:Andam (ETV)
- FIR (ETV)
- Lady Detective (ETV)
- Krishnadasi (Sun TV); 2000-2001
- Janaki Kalaganaledu (Star Maa); 2021
- Godavari 2026
