= Suresh =

Suresh is an Indian masculine given name originating in the Sanskrit word sureśa (compound of sura and īśa). Its meaning is "Ruler of Gods" and it has been used an epithet for the Hindu gods Indra, Brahma, Vishnu and Shiva.

== People ==
People named Suresh include:

- Suresh (actor, born 1963), Indian actor in Telugu and Tamil films
- Suresh (Hindi actor) (Naseem Ahmed, 1928–1979), Indian actor
- Suresh (director), Tamil film director
- Suresh Balaje, Indian film producer
- Suresh Bharadwaj, Indian politician
- Suresh Gopi (born 1960), Indian Malayalam film actor
- Suresh Heblikar, Indian Kannada film actor
- Suresh Joachim, Tamil Canadian film actor, producer and multiple Guinness World Record holder
- Suresh Joshi, Indian poet, writer and literary critic
- Suresh Kalmadi (1944–2026), Indian politician and senior sports administrator
- Suresh Krishna, Indian Malayali film actor
- Suresh Krissna, Indian Tamil film director
- Suresh Kumar (government official), American economist and businessman, Director-General of the U.S. Foreign Commercial Service
- Suresh Mhatre, Indian politician and businessman
- Suresh Oberoi, Indian Hindi movie actor
- Suresh Pachouri, Indian politician
- Suresh Raina, Indian cricketer
- Suresh Premachandran, Sri Lankan Tamil politician and leader of the Eelam People's Revolutionary Liberation Front
- Suresh Shyamlal Gupta, Social activist and politician.
- Suresh Venkatasubramanian, Indian-American computer scientist
- D. Suresh Babu, Indian Telugu film producer
- J. Suresh, Tamil film director
- Subra Suresh, engineer and scientist, president of Nanyang Technological University
- Mohinder Suresh, fictional character in the television series "Heroes"
- Keerthy Suresh, Indian actress

== See also ==
- Suresh v. Canada (Minister of Citizenship and Immigration) – a leading case of the Supreme Court of Canada
