= Vamsy =

Indian film director (born 1956)

- Born: Nallamilli Bavireddy; 20 November 1958 (age 67); Balabhadrapuram, East Godavari District, Andhra Pradesh, India
- Education: Andhra University
- Occupations: Director, actor, producer, screenwriter
- Awards: National Film Awards; Nandi Awards

Vamsy (born Nallamilli Bavireddy) is an Indian film director, screenwriter, littérateur, composer, poet, producer, actor and cartoonist known for his works in Telugu cinema, and television. He got his breakthrough with Sitaara (1984), which won the National Film Award for Best Feature Film in Telugu at the 32nd National Film Awards.

== Early life ==
Vamsy was born on 20 November 1956 in Balabhadrapuram, East Godavari District, Andhra Pradesh into a Telugu speaking family. He went to M.E.S Indian school but made movies in the Telugu region his childhood best friend was Farzana Zaman and also how he loved her with his life

== Career ==
Vamsy started writing stories at the age of 15. His first story, "Satya Sundari Navvindi", was read on All India Radio in 1987. He wrote two novels, "Manchu Pallaki" and "Karma Sakshi", which were published in "Andhra Jyothy Weekly" before beginning his film career. In 1985, Vamsy worked with V. Madhusudhana Rao in Madras, as assistant director for many films, and later worked as an assistant director to K. Viswanath on Sankarabharanam, Bharathiraja on Seethakoka Chilaka.

In 1982, he made his first film Manchupallaki, a remake of the Tamil film Palaivana Solai. In 1984, Vamsy made the critically acclaimed Sitaara, which starred Bhanupriya in her first role. The movie was adapted from Vamsy's own novel Mahal lo Kokila (The Nightingale in the Palace). The movie won the National Film Award for Best Feature Film in Telugu. In 1985, Vamsy made Preminchu Pelladu

== Television ==
Vamsy directed an ethnographic film Bommarshi Bapu, which won a Nandi Documentary Award for Best Director in 1996. He also directed a TV serials named Lady Detective and Sneha for ETV, which was aired every Thursday in 1995–96. For a significant period of his career, Vamsy collaborated with the music director Ilayaraja. The two were so attuned to each other's way of thinking that for a song in his movie Ladies Tailor, Vamsy shot the music video ("Ekkada Ekkada") before the song had been recorded by the music director.

== Literary works ==
Vamsy has published a short story compilation called Maa Pasalapudi Kathalu, and has written a wide variety of short stories since 1993. His major works include Mahallo kokila, Manchupallaki, Aa Naati Vaana Chinukulu, Venditera Kathalu, Vennela Bomma, Gokulam lo Radha, Ravvala konda, Sree seetarama lanchi service Rajahmundry, Manyam rani, and Rangularatnam. He has written around 360 short stories published in Swathi (magazine) weekly under the title Maa Diguwa Godavari Kathalu For his contributions to storytelling with a native approach, he was awarded with Sripada Puraskhaara at Rajamundry on 17 April 2011.

== Filmography ==
=== Director ===
==== Film ====
Year	Title	Notes
1982	Manchu Pallaki	Remake of Palaivana Solai
1984	Sitaara	National Film Award for Best Feature Film in Telugu
1985	Anveshana	
1985	Preminchu Pelladu	
1986	Aalaapana	
1986	Ladies Tailor	
1987	Lawyer Suhasini	
1987	Maharshi	
1987	Sri Kanaka Mahalaxmi Recording Dance Troupe	
1989	Chettu Kinda Pleader	Remake of Thanthram
1989	Swarakalpana	
1991	April 1 Vidudhala	
1992	Detective Narada	
1993	Joker	Remake of Kilukkampetti
1994	Prema & Co	
1994	Neeku 16 Naaku 18	
1995	Lingababu Love Story	
1997	Wife of V. Varaprasad	
2002	Avunu Valliddaru Ista Paddaru	
2003	Donga Ramudu and Party	
2004	Konchem Touchlo Vunte Cheputanu	
2007	Anumanaspadam	
2009	Gopi Gopika Godavari	
2010	Saradaga Kasepu	
2016	Vennello Hai Hai	
2017	Fashion Designer s/o Ladies Tailor	

==== Television ====
Year	Title	Notes
1995	Sneha	
1996	Lady Detective	

=== Assistant Director ===
Year	Title	Notes
1977	Edureeta	
1978	Vichitra Jeevitham	
1979	Tayaramma Bangarayya	
1979	Pagadala Padava	1 Schedule
1980	Sankarabharanam	
1980	Subhodayam	
1981	Seethakoka Chilaka	

=== Lyricist ===
Year	Title	Notes
1988	Sri Kanaka Mahalakshmi Recording Dance Troupe	
1989	Swarakalpana	
1990	Gali Kondapuram Railway Gate	
1992	Detective Narada	
2007	Anumanaspadam	

=== Singer ===
Year	Title	Notes
2009	Gopi Gopika Godavari	Balagodari
2010	Saradaga Kasepu	Oohalo Sundara, Manimaala

=== Writer ===
Book Title	Notes
Manchu Pallaki - మంచుపల్లకి	Novel
Vennela Bomma - వెన్నెల బొమ్మ	Novel
Mahallo Kokila - మహల్లో కోకిల	Novel - Sitaara Movie
Gokulamlo Radha - గోకులంలో రాధ	Novel
Gali Kondapuram Railway Gate - గాలికొండపురం రైల్వేగేటు	Novel
Ravvala Konda - రవ్వలకొండ	Novel
Venditera Navalalu - వెండితెర నవలలు	
Maa Pasalapudi Kadhalu - మా పసలపూడి కధలు	Collection of stories
Maa Diguva Godaari Kadhalu - మా దిగువగోదారి కధలు	Collection of stories
Aakupachhani Gnyaapakam - ఆకుపచ్చని జ్ఞ్యాపకం	Collection of stories
Aanati Vaana Chinukulu - ఆనాటి వానచినుకులు	Collection of stories. This has been combined with Aakupachhani Gnyaapakam later
Manyam Rani - మన్యం రాణి	Novel
Rangula Ratnam - రంగుల రాట్నం	Novel
Vamsy ki Nachhina Kadhalu - Part 1 - వంశీకి నచ్చిన కధలు 1	Collection of stories by popular writers, edited by Vamsy
Vamsy ki Nachhina Kadhalu - Part 2 - వంశీకి నచ్చిన కధలు 2	Collection of stories by popular writers, edited by Vamsy
Matlade Gnyaapakalu - మాట్లాడే జ్ఞ్యాపకాలు	Collection of stories
Nallamillori Palem Kadhalu - నల్లమిల్లోరిపాలెం కధలు	Collection of stories
Khachhitamgaa Naku Telsu - ఖచ్చితంగా నాకు తెల్సు కధలు (No Stock)	Collection of stories
Polamaarina Gnyaapakalu - పొలమారిన జ్ఞ్యాపకాలు	The first in Indian Literature to write the real-life incidents with a nostalgic story narration with supporting pictures.
Evo Konni Gurthukostunnayi - ఏవో.. కొన్ని గుర్తుకొస్తున్నాయి	Collection of his movie flash backs
Pandaga rojullo pasalapoodi yatra - పండుగ రోజుల్లో పసలపూడి యాత్ర	Collection of stories

=== Music director ===
Year	Title
1993	Joker
1993	Kannayya Kittayya
1994	Prema & Co
1994	Neeku 16 Naaku 18
1995	Lingababu Love Story
