= Vennelakanti =

Vennelakanti is a Telugu surname. Notable people with the surname include:

- Vennelakanti Raghavayya (1897–1981), Indian freedom activist and social worker
- Vennelakanti (1957–2021), Indian film lyricist
