= Tanikella Bharani =

Indian actor

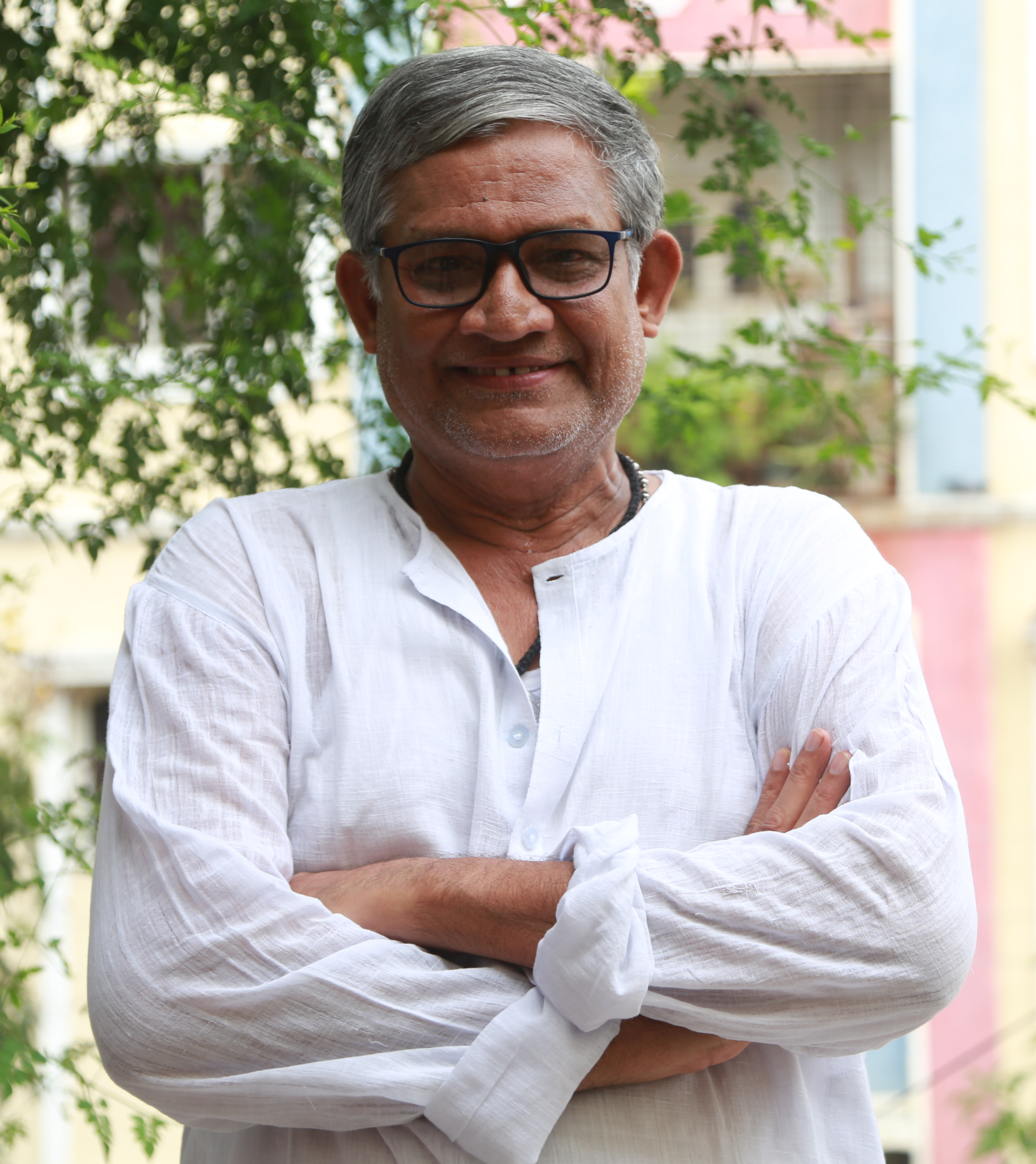
- Tanikella at an event
- Born: 14 July 1954 (age 72); Jagannathapuram, Andhra State, India (present-day Andhra Pradesh, India)
- Occupations: Actor; writer; director; comedian
- Years active: 1984–present
- Spouse: Durga Bhavani
- Children: 2

Tanikella Bharani (born 14 July 1954) is an Indian actor, screenwriter, poet and playwright who works predominantly in Telugu cinema. He has worked as an actor in more than 750 films, including few in Tamil, Kannada and Hindi; while he was also screenwriter for 52 films. He has won three Nandi Awards.

== Early life ==
Tanikella Bharani's ancestors includes poets and literary figures of Telugu literature. Diwakarla Venkatavadhani and Viswanatha Satyanarayana were his grand uncles. Divakarla Tirupati Sastry, one of the Telugu poet duo Tirupati Venkata Kavulu, was his great-granduncle.

He was born into a Telugu Brahmin family.

He is a religious Hindu who is known for singing devotional songs in praise of Sri Shiva and Devi Parvati, and propagates to his fellow Hindus to not just read the Bhagavad Gita but to follow what it teaches.

== Career ==
Tanikella did stage plays in the mid 1970s and during this time he made the acquaintance of Rallapalli, a Telugu cinema actor. With his help Tanikella started writing small dialogues and stage scenes. Later, he took a diploma in Theatre arts. Following Rallapalli's advice he moved to Chennai.

He started his career as a dialogue writer for Kanchu Kavachum in 1984 and has written dialogues for various movies like Ladies Tailor (1985), Sri Kanaka Mahalakshmi Recording Dance Troupe (1987), Varasudochhadu (1988), Chettu Kinda Pleader (1989), Swara Kalpana (1989), Siva (1989) and Seenu Vasanthi Lakshmi (2004). He also penned and sung the lyrics of Gundamma Gaari Manavadu (Bhale Bhaleti Mandu).

He has acted in more than 750 movies starting with Ladies Tailor (1985) and Sri Kanaka Mahalakshmi Recording Dance Troupe (1987) in which he was seen as Dora Babu. In 1989 he appeared in the hit film Siva, by Ram Gopal Varma, which starred Nagarjuna. With the release of the film Shiva, he received much recognition for his character Nanaji.

He also played a supporting role in the comedy film Bombay Priyudu in 1996. His powerful antagonism in Samudram won him the Nandi award as the Best Villain. After 2000, he started playing more mature roles in movies like Manmadhudu (2002), Okariki Okaru (2003), Samba (2004), Malliswari, Godavari (2006), and Happy (2006).

He directed the drama film Mithunam is a 2012 featuring S. P. Balasubrahmanyam and Lakshmi. He received CineMAA Award Special Jury Award for Best Direction for this film.

He wrote seven Telugu devotional songs for the album "Nee Lona Shivudu Galudu, Na Lona Shivudu Galadu," literally translating as "The Lord Shiva in you and the Lord Shiva in me can rule the world." He also sang the title song for Nalona sivudu galadu and Shahabash Raa Shankara which were written by him.

== Bibliography ==
Books

1. Parikini
2. Nakshatra Darsanam
3. Maathralu
4. Endaro Mahanubavulu

Plays (Drama)

1. Jambu Dweepam
2. Kokkorokko
3. Chal Chal Gurram
4. Gaardhabhaandam
5. Gograhanam
6. Naalugo Kothi

Playlets (Telugu)

- Gaardhabhanda
- Gograhanam
- Kokkoroko
- Chalchal Gurram
- Jambudweepam
- Grahanam Pattina Ratri
- Sani Grahalu
- Goyyi
- Panjaram Lo Elaka
- Hulakki

Song compositions

1. "Naalona Sividu Kaladu" is a composition of 7 songs written by Tanikella.
2. "Sabhash raa sankara!" Is composition by Tanikella about the concept of Shiva.
3. "Naamanasu Kothi raa Raama!"

Spiritual Books

1. Aata Gadaraa Siva
2. Sabhashuraa Sankara

== Personal life ==
He married Durga Bhavani in 1988. The couple has two children, Teja and Soundarya Lahari. They reside in Yousufguda, Hyderabad.

Teja made his debut as an actor in the film Mr Lavangam (2012).

== Awards ==
Nandi Awards

- Best Villain – Samudhram
- Best Character Actor – Nuvvu Nenu
- Nandi Award for Best Dialogue Writer – Mithunam

Literary Awards

- Sri Pada Subhramanya Sastry Literary Award – Polamuru
- Bhanumathi Award – Hyderabad
- Sri Vanamamalai Varadacharyulu Literary Award – Adilabad
- Fellowship Jawahar Bharathi – Kavali
- Allu Ramalingayyiah National Award – Hyderabad
- Akkineni Swarna Kankanam – Hyderabad
- Nagabhairava Koteswara Rao literary Award – Nellore

CineMAA Awards

- Special Jury Award for Best Director – Mithunam (2013)

Sangam Academy Awards

- Sangam Academy award for completing Twenty five years in Telugu Cinema

Awards for Short Films (as a Director)

- Tenth Mumbai International Film Festival Award
- Idaho Panhandle International Film Festival Best Antiterrorist Message Award for Sira-The Ink
- Hyderabad International Film Festival Award for Sira-The Ink

Lok Nayak Foundation Sahitya Puraskar

- Lok Nayak Foundation Sahitya Puraskar presented to Tanikella Bharani in Visakhapatnam.

== See also ==
- List of Indian writers
