= List of programmes broadcast by ETV (Telugu) =

This is a list consisting of current, upcoming, and former broadcasts by the Indian Telugu TV channel ETV.

== Current programming ==
=== Serials ===
Data As of 3rd Nov 2026 !!

Serial name	Timings	No. of episodes
Jai Ganesha	8:30 AM	1020+
Aaro Pranam	12:00 PM	445+
Sandhya Ragam	12:30 PM	445+
Rangula Ratnam	1:00 PM	1550+
Sirimalle Puvvu	1:30 PM	70+
Merupu Kalalu	2:00 PM	445+
Veyi Subhamulu Kalugu Neeku	2:30 PM	445+
Vasundhara	3:00 PM	445+
Guvva Gorinka	3:30 PM	Repeat
Janaki Parinayam	6:00 PM	235+
Andhala Rakshasi	6:30 PM	415+
Jhansi	7:00 PM	555+
Ammoru	7:30 PM	220+
Bommarillu	8:00 PM	620+
Seetharamayya Gari Manavaralu	8:30 PM	55+
Aliveni Animuthyam	9:30 PM	90+
Kodalla Training Center	10:00 PM	90+

=== Reality shows ===
Show	No. of episodes
Padutha Theeyaga Season 26	27+
Suma Adda	146+
Dhee (TV series) Season 20	45+
Jabardasth	735+
Extra Jabardasth	481 Final
Sridevi Drama Company	250+
Swarabhishekam - Season 14	Abruptly stopped
Family Stars	70+
Taggedhe Le	100+
Aadavallu Meeku Joharlu	859 Final
Aaradhana	5000+
Annadatha	5000+

ETV News

== Programme guide ==
Programme	Year	Notes	Episodes / time
Abhishekam	2008-2022		4000 Final
Aadade Aadharam	2009-2020		3329 Final
Akasa Ganga	2010-2012		420+
Amma	2020-2021		302 Final
Anu Pallavi	Oct 2022-March 2024		454 Final
Attarintiki Daredi	Nov 2014-July 2022		2344 Final
Bharyamani	2009-2014		1741 Final
ETV News	January 26 2004		7 AM 9 PM
Guvva Gorinka	Dec 2022-Nov 2024		600 Final
Gangothri	2022-2023		179 Final
Geetha Govindam	2022-2023		375 Final
Gokulamlo Seetha	June 2015 - May 2017		601 Final
Jeevana Tarangaalu	May 2025 - May 2026		289 Final
Kalisundham Raa	Dec 2023 - Jan 2026		657 Final
Kumkuma Rekha	2011-2013		570 Final
Lahiri Lahiri Lahiri Lo	2018-2020		486 Final
Manasantha Nuvve	Jan 2022 - Aug 2026		1441 Final
Maa Attha Bangaram	Feb 2023-Oct 2024		511 Final
Mouna Poratam	April 2022 - May 2025		976 Final
Manasu Mamata	2011-2021		3305 Final
Naa Peru Meenakshi	2015-2022		1997 Final
Nenu Sailaja	June 2024 - April 2025		268 Final
Nalugu Sthambhalata	Jan 2019 - June 2020		368 Final
Okariki Okaru	2017-2018		297 Final
Puttadi Bomma	2010-2014		1356 Final
Prema Nagar	2019-2020		219 Final
Ravoyi Chandamama	April 2021 - Jan 2025		1170 Final
Radha Manoharam	April 2024 - May 2025		331 Final
Ruthugeetham	Oct 2017 - Sep 2018		303 Final
Real Detectives	2015-2016		34
Subhakankshalu	May 2025 - June 2025	Abruptly Stopped	30 Closed
Shatamanam Bhavati	April 2021 - June 2025		1308 Final
Savithri	2015-2019		1333 Final
Seethamma Vakitlo Sirimalle Chettu	2015-2022		2152 Final
Sikharam	2012-2015		851 Final
Swarna Khadgam	2018-2019		112 Final
Srimanthudu	2021-2022		576 Final
Srimathi	2020-2021		202 Final
Swathi Chinukulu	2013-2020		2126 Final
Teenemanasulu	2017-2018		161 Final
Thoorpu Velle Railu	2008-2011		750 Final
Thoorppu Padamara	2009-2011		510+
Vasantha Kokila	July 2024 - May 2025		277 Final
Yashoda	Oct 2025 - Aug 2026		262 Final
Yamaleela - Aa Taruvatha	2020-2022		480 Final
Gowaramma	2021		222 Final
Kanchana Maala	2019		72 Final
1995 - 2010	(Old Serials)		
Antharangalu	1997-2001		
Aloukika	2004-2006		341 Final
Anveshitha	1997-1999		
Aadapilla	2006-2008	Abruptly Stopped	
Anubandham	1999-2001		93 Final
Aadhithaalam	1995-1996		
Abadhala Pellelu	1995		
Akka Chellelu	2001-2002		
Annayya	2002-2003		
Agnikundam	2005-2006		
Akshara	2009		
Aalumagalu	1998		
Ammayigaru	2009		
Agnipravesam	2002-2003		
Aparna	2000-2001		
Anoohya	2001-2002		
Agnisakshi	2002-2003		
Bharya Bharthalu	2000		
Bethala Kathalu	1995-1996		
Nee Perena Prema			
Srimathi Sri Subhramanyam	2009	Abruptly Stopped	
Sravanameghalu	2007	Abruptly Stopped	
Godavari	2008-2009		
Manasu Chooda Tharama	2007-2008		340 Final
Maya	2009	Abruptly Stopped	
Manasaveena	2000		
Sravanameghalu	2007		
Eenati Ramayanam	2001-2002		
Thalambralu	2003-2004		
Kalikaalam	2004		
Swathi Muthyam	2003-2004		
Sangharshana	1999-2000		
Janani	2000-2001		
Mathrudevatha	2001		
Chadarangam	2001-2002		
Sandhyaragam	2007		
Vidhi	2000-2002		
Jwala	1999		
Illalu	2002-2003		
Priyanka	2003-2006		
Agninakshathram	2007-2008		
Hrudayam	2012		
Sambhavi	2011		
Nageswari	2006		
Nagastram	2003-2006		
Pelli Pandiri	1997		
Manasu Geesina Bomma	1998		
Nandini	1998		
Idhi Kadha Kaadu	1998-2000		
Manoyagnam	2001-2002		220 Final
Sukha Dukhalu	2001-2003		
Ramudu Manchi Baludu	2002		
Gruhapravesam	2002-2003		
Lady Detective	1995-1996		
Sneha	1995-?		
Narasarajeeyam	1995		
Vasundhara	1995-2006		
Popula Pette	1997-1997		
Mounaragaalu	2001-2002		
Priyamaina Sathruvu	2002-2003		
Sivaleelalu	2000-2001		
Bangaru Bomma	2000-2001		
Illalu	2002-2003		
Nippulanti Nijam	2001-2002		
Meera	2002		
Padmavyuham	2003-2007		
Kaveri	1996		
Subhalekha	2007-2008	Abruptly Stopped	
Durga	2004-2005		
Jayam	2003-2005		
Santhi Nivasam	2000-2001		
Santhinikethan	1995-1996		
Nathicharami	2005-2007		
Geethanjali	2006-2007		
Bandhavyalu	2008		
Wonder Boy	1995		
University	1998		
Tarangini	2007	215 Final	
Jeevitham	2007	Abruptly Stopped	
Mahalakshmi	2006-2008	Abruptly Stopped	
Bandham	2006-2007	Abruptly Stopped	
Pelli Chesukundam	2003-2004		
Bujji Bujjibabu	2007		
Chakra Theertham	2007		
Endamavulu	2001-2006		
Vadina	2002-2003		
Kadha Sudha	1995		
Naa Mogudu Naaku Sontham	2003-2004		
Kurukshethram	2005-2006		
Santhosham	2004-2005		
Velugu Needalu	1998-1999		
Inti Intiko Katha	2007-2008		
Eetharam Katha	1999-2000		
Gharshana	2007		
Sirisha	2007		
Sreebhagavatham	2003-2007		
Vikramarka	2006-2007		

News bulletin 2004|. ETV News | January 2004

=== Dubbed fiction ===
- Ananda Bhavan (2002)
- Ananda Kutumbam (1996)
- Bharyamani Udyogam (1997)
- Run (2021)
- Devimahathmyam (2011-2012)
- Jai Hanuman (2017)
- Sathi Leelavathi
- FIR (1997)
- Lakshyam
- Puttadi Bomma (1997-1998)
- Subhalagnam (2021-2022)
- Manoharam (2022)
- Jhansi Rani (2021-2022)
- Tipu Sulthan (1996)
- Rahasyam (1996-1997)
- Mayavruksham (2002)
- Harathi (2005-2007)
- Panchani Samsaram (2022)
- Premedaivam (1996-1998)
- Jeevana Sandhya (1999-2000)
- Nanna Kosam (2002)
- Guppedu Manasu (1995-1996)
- Vasundhara (1995)
- Premalu Pellelu
- Bharathi (2007)
- Malgudi Kathalu (1995-1996)
- Rathri (1995-1996)
- Jeevana Sandhya (1999-2000)
- Needa (1995-1996)
- Na Bharya Katha (1996)
- Dr. Dharani (1996)
- Kshana Kshanam (1999-2000)
- Bommarillu (2021)
- Kutra (2000-2001)
- Theerpu (1995-1996)
- Stone Boy (1996)
- Sumangali (2024-2025) Abtruply Stopped (460 Episodes Final)
- Prema Mandiram (2007-2012)
- Sri Krishna Leelalu (2014)
- O Chinnadana (2021)
- Vasantham (2015-2020)
- Kavya (Oct 2024 - Aug 2025)
- Ra Ra Krishnayya (April 2024 - Aug 2025)
- Sadhguru Sai (July 2020 - Aug 2025)
- Jagadheeswari (2010-2012)
- Vichithra Bandham (2022)
- Mahabharatham (2010-2011)
- Merupu Kalalu (2007-2008)

=== Non-fiction ===
- Alitho Saradaga (2016–2022)
- Aadavallu Meeku Joharlu (2022-2025)
- Dial Your Star (1995-1996)
- Cinema Quiz (1995-1996)
- Cinemasala (1995)
- Countdown (1995-1996)
- Andhravani
- Sarigamalu
- Manasuna Manasai (1996-1997)
- Sunday Sandhadi
- Superior Home Minister (2007)
- Koyela (2007)
- Jeevana Jyothi (2011-2014)
- Star To Sardhaga (2007)
- Sumanoharalu (2006-2008)
- ATM (2011)
- Pelli Sandadi (2011)
- Indradhanassu (1995-1998)
- Jeevana Jyothi (2011)
- Love Love Love (1995-1996)
- Priyaragalu
- Andhame Aanandham (1995-1999)
- Narthanasala (2012-2013)
- Get Ready (2012-2014)
- Nuvvu Ready Nenu Ready (2020-2021)
- Panduga Chesko (2019-2020)
- Manam (2018-2020)
- Smile Rani Smile (2007)
- Funtastic (2007)
- Raga (2007)
- Cine Maruti (2007)
- Star Mahila (2008-2020)
- Abhiruchi
- Pushpakavimanam (2017-2018)
- Kudirite Cup-pu Coffee (2011-2012)
- Hats Off (1995)
- Horlicks Hrudayanjali (1995-1997)
- Manoranjini (1995-1996)
- Madhurimalu (1995)
- Chithramalika (1995-1996)
- Mahilalu Maharanulu (2007)
- Soundaryalahari (2014-2015)
- Sithara (1995)
- Studio Roundup (1995)
- Comic Tonic (1995-1999)
- Guinness Book (1995-1997)
- Sadhana (1995-1996)
- Prathibha (1995)
- Pragathi (1996)
- Gunshot (1998-1999)
- Movie Mirchi (2007)
- Bharathi (1996-1997)
- Animuthyalu (1995)
- Masterminds (1995)
- Janthuprapancham (1995-1996)
- Medha (1995)
- Coca-Cola Hungama (1997)
- Super Duper (2007)
- Bid 2 Win (2007)
- Prathidhwani (1995)
- Sirimuvvalu (1996)
- Nihari (1995)
- Alitho Jollygaa (2015-2016)
- Sye Sye Sayyare (2017-2018)
- Lekhavari (1996)
- Dear ETV (1996)
- Telefilms (1998-2007)
- Maha Maha Mass
- Yahoo (2003-2008)
- Champion (2016-2017)
- Aapatha Madhuralu (1996-1998)
- Cash 2.0 (2016–2022)

=== Animated series ===
- Disney Sandhya (1999–?)
- Panchatantram (2003–2007)
- Vadina Enti Sangathi (2007)
- Bhale Denver (1995–1996)
- Sabash Tin-Tin (1996)
- Baboi Dennis
