= Ramoji Rao =

Indian businessman, media proprietor and film producer (1936–2024)

- Born: Cherukuri Ramoji Rao; 16 November 1936; Pedaparupudi, Madras Presidency, British Raj (now in Andhra Pradesh, India)
- Died: 8 June 2024 (aged 87); Hyderabad, Telangana, India
- Occupations: Businessman, Media Proprietor, Film producer
- Spouse: Rama Devi (m. 1961)
- Awards: Padma Vibhushan (2016)

Cherukuri Ramoji Rao (16 November 1936 – 8 June 2024) was an Indian businessman, media proprietor and film producer. He was head of the Ramoji Group which owns the world's largest film production facility Ramoji Film City, Eenadu newspaper, ETV Network of TV channels, film production company Usha Kiran Movies.

His other business ventures included Margadarsi Chit Fund, Dolphin Group of Hotels, Kalanjali Shopping Mall, Priya Pickles, ETV Win OTT platform and Mayuri Film Distributors.

Rao garnered four Filmfare Awards South, five Nandi Awards and the National Film Award for his works in Telugu cinema. In 2016, he was honoured with the Padma Vibhushan, India's second-highest civilian honour, for his contributions in journalism, literature and education.

== Personal life ==
Cherukuri Ramoji Rao was born on 16 November 1936 in a Telugu family in Pedaparupudi of Krishna District, Madras Presidency (now Andhra Pradesh), India. Companies owned by the Ramoji Group include Margadarsi Chit Fund, Eenadu newspaper, ETV Network, Ramadevi Public School, Priya Foods, Kalanjali, Usha Kiran Movies, and Ramoji Film City near Hyderabad. He was also the chairman of Dolphin Group of Hotels in Andhra Pradesh.

Rao's younger son, Cherukuri Suman, died of leukaemia on 7 September 2012. Rao died from heart disease in Hyderabad, on 8 June 2024, at the age of 87. He was cremated with state honours at Ramoji Film City, on 9 June 2024, where his memorial is expected to come up.

== Filmography ==
=== Films ===
Year	Film title	Language	Notes	Ref.
1984	Srivariki Premalekha	Telugu		
1984	Kanchana Ganga	Telugu		
1984	Sundari Subbarao	Telugu		
1985	Mayuri	Telugu	Remade in Hindi as Naache Mayuri; dubbed into Malayalam and Tamil as Mayoori	
1985	Pratighatana	Telugu	Remade in Malayalam as Pakarathinu Pakaram and Hindi as Pratighaat	
1985	Preminchu Pelladu	Telugu		
1986	Pakarathinu Pakaram	Malayalam	Remake of Pratighatana	
1986	Mallemoggalu	Telugu		
1986	Car Diddina Kapuram	Telugu		
1986	Naache Mayuri	Hindi	Remake of Mayuri	
1987	Chandamama Rave	Telugu		
1987	Pratighaat	Hindi	Remake of Pratighatana	
1987	Premayanam	Telugu		
1988	O Bharya Katha	Telugu		
1989	Mouna Poratam	Telugu		
1989	Paila Pacheesu	Telugu		
1990	Judgement	Telugu		
1990	Mamasri	Telugu		
1990	Manasu Mamata	Telugu		
1991	Amma	Telugu		
1991	Aswini	Telugu		
1991	People's Encounter	Telugu		
1991	Jagannatham & Sons	Telugu		
1992	Vasundhara	Telugu		
1992	Teja	Telugu		
1998	Padutha Theeyaga	Telugu		
1998	Daddy Daddy	Telugu		
1999	Mechanic Mavayya	Telugu		
2000	Subhavela	Telugu		
2000	Chitram	Telugu	Remade in Kannada as Chitra	
2000	Moodu Mukkalaata	Telugu		
2000	Nuvve Kavali	Telugu	Remake of Niram; remade in Hindi as Tujhe Meri Kasam and Kannada as Ninagagi	
2000	Dr. Munshir Diary	Bengali	Feluda Telefilm	
2000	Madhuri	Telugu		
2001	Deevinchandi	Telugu		
2001	Ninnu Choodalani	Telugu		
2001	Akasa Veedhilo	Telugu		
2001	Chitra	Kannada	Remake of Chitram	
2001	Anandam	Telugu	Remade in Tamil as Inidhu Inidhu Kadhal Inidhu	
2001	Ishtam	Telugu		
2002	Manasuvunte Chalu	Telugu		
2002	Priya Nestama	Telugu		
2002	Neetho	Telugu		
2002	Ninagagi	Kannada	Remake of Nuvve Kavali	
2003	Tujhe Meri Kasam	Hindi	Remake of Nuvve Kavali	
2003	Ananda	Kannada	Remake of Telugu film Anandam	
2003	Oka Raju Oka Rani	Telugu		
2003	Toli Choopulone	Telugu		
2003	Inidhu Inidhu Kadhal Inidhu	Tamil	Remake of Anandam	
2003	Bombaiyer Bombete	Bengali	Feluda Film	
2004	Anandamanandamaye	Telugu		
2004	Thoda Tum Badlo Thoda Hum	Hindi		
2006	Veedhi	Telugu		
2007	Sixer	Kannada		
2008	Nachavule	Telugu		
2009	Ninnu Kalisaka	Telugu		
2009	Savaari	Kannada	Remake of Gamyam; co-production with Arka Media Works	
2010	Betting Bangaraju	Telugu		
2011	Nuvvila	Telugu		
2015	Beeruva	Telugu	Co-production with Anandi Art Creations	
2015	Dagudumootha Dandakor	Telugu	Remake of Saivam; co-production with First Frame Entertainment	

=== Television ===
Year	Series title	Language	Notes	Ref.
1995–1999	Sneha	Telugu		
1997	Popula Pette	Telugu		
2003–2007	Panchatantram	Telugu		

== Awards and honours ==
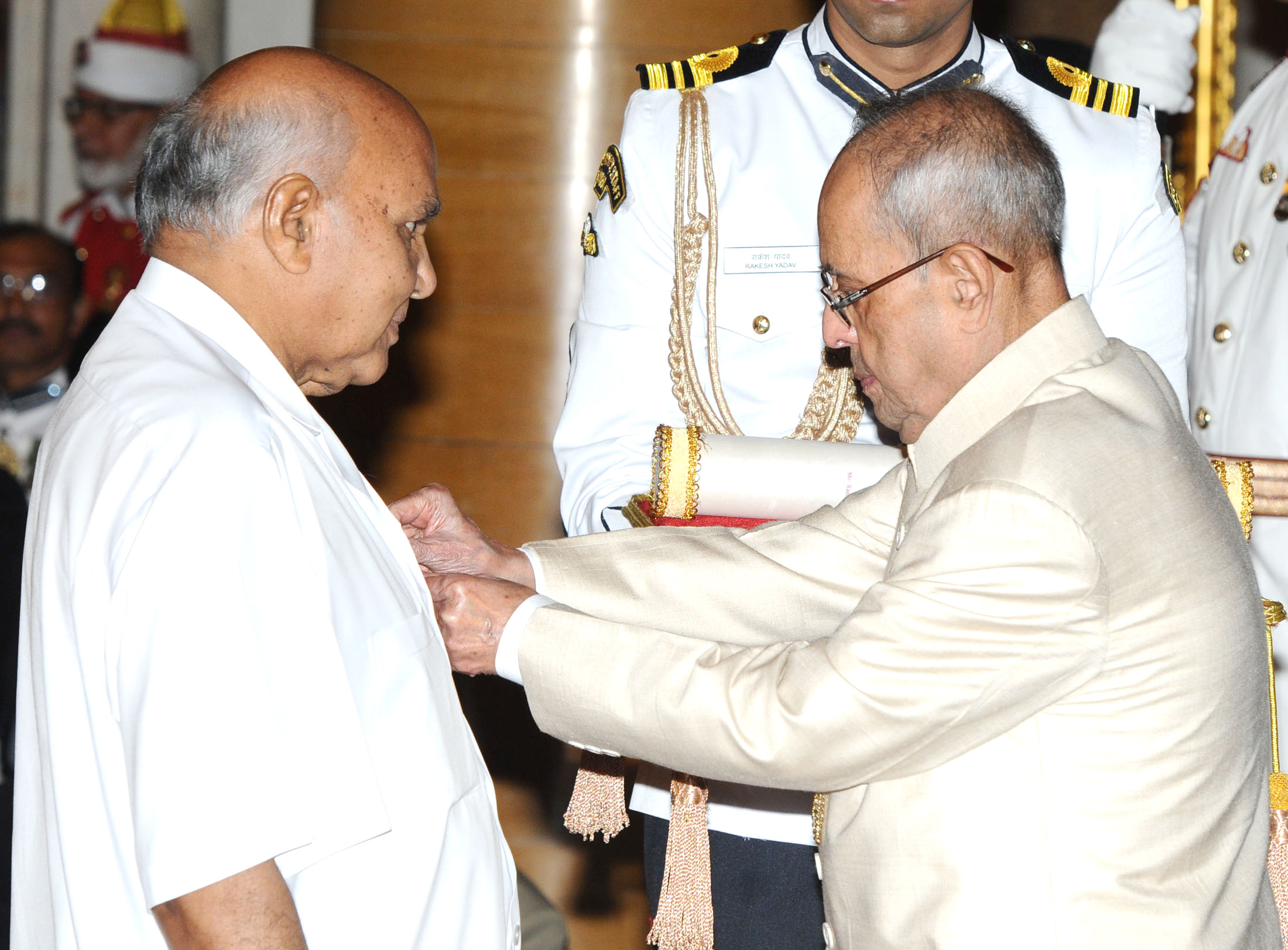
President Shri Pranab Mukherjee presenting the Padma Vibhushan Award to Shri Ramoji Rao, at a civil investiture ceremony, at Rashtrapati Bhavan, in New Delhi on 12 April 2016

Civilian honours

- Padma Vibhushan (2016) – Government of India

National Film Awards

- National Film Award for Best Feature Film in Telugu (producer) – Nuvve Kavali (2000)

Filmfare Awards

- Filmfare Best Film Award (Telugu) – Pratighatana (1985)
- Filmfare Special Award - South for outstanding contributions towards Indian cinema (1998)
- Filmfare Best Film Award (Telugu) – Nuvve Kavali (2000)
- Filmfare Lifetime Achievement Award - South (2004)

Nandi Awards

- Best Feature Film - Silver – Kanchana Ganga (1984)
- Best Feature Film - Gold – Mayuri (1985)
- Best Feature Film - Silver – Mouna Poratam (1989)
- Best Feature Film - Bronze – Aswini (1991)
- Best Children's Film - Gold – Teja (1992)
