= Usha Kiran Movies =

Indian film production company

- Type: Subsidiary
- Industry: Entertainment
- Founded: 1983; 43 years ago
- Founder: Ramoji Rao
- Headquarters: Balayogi Paryatak Bhavan, Greenlands, Begumpet, Hyderabad, India
- Products: Films
- Owner: Ramoji Group

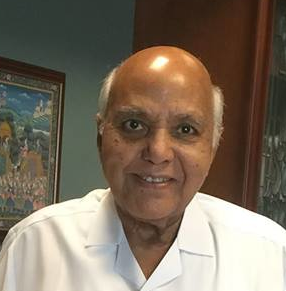
Ramoji Rao, founder of Usha Kiran Movies

Usha Kiran Movies is an Indian film production company founded by Ramoji Rao in 1983. It is a part of Ramoji Group. This film production house has produced over 80 films with the majority of them in Telugu, along with some in Kannada, Hindi and other languages.

== History ==
The production house is known for giving an opportunity to young talent and produced many content-oriented films under Usha Kiran Movies banner. The production company started with the film Srivariki Premalekha (1984).

== Partial filmography ==
Year	Film	Language	Actors	Director	Notes
1984	Srivariki Premalekha	Telugu	Naresh, Poornima	Jandhyala	
1984	Kanchana Ganga	Telugu	Chandra Mohan, Saritha, Swapna, Sarath Babu	V. Madhusudhana Rao	
1984	Sundari Subbarao	Telugu	Chandra Mohan, Vijayshanti	Relangi Narasimha Rao	
1985	Mayuri	Telugu	Sudha Chandran, Subhakar	Singeetam Srinivasa Rao	Remade in Hindi as Naache Mayuri; Dubbed in to Malayalam and Tamil as Mayoori
1985	Pratighatana	Telugu	Vijayshanti, Chandra Mohan	T. Krishna	Dubbed in Malayalam as Pakarathinu Pakaram and remade in Hindi as Pratighaat
1985	Preminchu Pelladu	Telugu	Rajendra Prasad, Bhanupriya	Vamsy	
1986	Mallemoggalu	Telugu	Sagarika, Rajesh	V. Madhusudhana Rao	
1986	Poojaki Panikiradani Puvvu	Telugu	Shekhar Suman, Thulasi	A. Mohan Gandhi	
1986	Karu Diddina Kapuram	Telugu	Rajendra Prasad, Pavitra	D.V. Narasa Raju	
1986	Naache Mayuri	Hindi	Sudha Chandran, Shekhar Suman	T. Rama Rao	Remake of Mayuri
1987	Chandamama Rave	Telugu	Chandra Mohan, Kalpana	Moulee	
1987	Pratighaat	Hindi	Sujata Mehta	N. Chandra	Remake of Pratighatana
1988	Premayanam	Telugu	Naresh, Jayashree	C. V. Sridhar	
1988	O Bharya Katha	Telugu	Jayasudha, Chandra Mohan, Sarath Babu	Moulee	
1989	Mouna Poratam	Telugu	Yamuna, Vinod Kumar	Mohan Gandhi	
1989	Paila Pacheesu	Telugu	Rajendra Prasad, Ramya Krishna, Brahmanandam	Moulee	
1990	Judgement	Telugu	Siva Krishna, Vinod Kumar, Yamuna, Aruna	A.Mohan Gandhi	
1990	Mamasri	Telugu	Suresh, Ramyakrishna, Liji, Anand	Sharath	
1990	Manasu Mamata	Telugu	Naresh, Sithara	Moulee	
1991	Amma	Telugu	Suhasini, Sarathbabu, Baby Sunayana	Suresh Krissna	
1991	Aswini	Telugu	Bhanu Chander, Ashwini Nachappa	Moulee	
1991	People's Encounter	Telugu	Meka Srikanth, Vinod kumar, Bhanupriya	Mohan Gandhi	
1992	Jagannatham & Sons	Telugu	Suresh, Sindhuja	Anil Kumar	
1992	Teja	Telugu	Tarun Kumar, Tulasi	N. Hari Babu	
1992	Sriman Brahmachari	Telugu	Suresh	Sarath	
1992	Vasundhara	Telugu	Sithara	Suresh Krissna	
1993	Jeevithame Oka Cinema	Telugu	Varunraj	Phani Ramachandra	
1998	Padutha Theeyaga	Telugu	Vineeth, Heera Rajagopal	Kranthi Kumar	
1998	Daddy Daddy	Telugu	ANR, Jayasudha, Harish, Raasi	Kodi Ramakrishna	
1999	Mechanic Mavayya	Telugu	Rajasekhar, Rambha	S. V. Rajendra Singh Babu	
2000	Subhavela	Telugu	Ravi Kanth, Anasuya	Ramana	
2000	Chitram	Telugu	Uday Kiran, Reema Sen	Teja	Remade in Kannada as Chitra
2000	Madhuri	Telugu	Abbas	Mouli	
2000	Moodu Mukkalaata	Telugu	Jagapati Babu, Soundarya, Rambha, Raasi	K. Raghavendra Rao	
2000	Nuvve Kavali	Telugu	Tarun Kumar, Richa Pallod	K. Vijaya Bhaskar	Remake of Niram and Remade in Hindi as Tujhe Meri Kasam and Kannada as Ninagagi
2001	Deevinchandi	Telugu	Srikanth, Raasi, Malavika	Muthyala Subbaiah	
2001	Ninnu Choodalani	Telugu	Jr. NTR, Raveena Rajput	V. R. Pratap	
2001	Akasa Veedhilo	Telugu	Nagarjuna, Rajendra Prasad, Raveena Tandon, Kasthuri	Singeetam Srinivasa Rao	
2001	Chitra	Kannada	Nagendra Prasad, Rekha Vedavyas	Dinesh Baboo	Remake of Chitram
2001	Anandam	Telugu	Aakash, Rekha Vedavyas, Venkat, Tanu Roy	Srinu Vaitla	Remade in Tamil as Inidhu Inidhu Kadhal Inidhu
2001	Cheluve Ondu Helthini	Kannada	Saurav, Chaitra Hallikeri	R. Saigopal	
2001	Ishtam	Telugu	Charan, Shriya Saran	Vikram Kumar & Raj Kumar	
2002	Manasuvunte Chalu	Telugu	Sai Kiran, Jennifer Kotwal, Sivaji	Jonnalagadda Sreenivasa Rao	
2002	Priya Nestama	Telugu	Venu Thottempudi, Shanu	R. Ganapathi	
2002	Ninagagi	Kannada	Vijay Raghavendra, Radhika	S. Mahendar	Remake of Nuvve Kavali
2002	Neetho	Telugu	Prakash Kovelamudi, Mahek Chahal	John Mahendran	
2002	Beeper	English	Ed Quinn, Harvey Keitel, Joey Lauren Adams, Gulshan Grover	Jack Sholder	Co Production with Shoreline Entertainment
2002	Manase O Manase	Kannada	Ramkumar	M. S. Rajashekar	Remake of Manasu Mamtha
2002	Dheera	Kannada	Rockline Venkatesh	Om Sai Prakash	Remake of Evadra Rowdy
2003	Tujhe Meri Kasam	Hindi	Ritesh Deshmukh, Genelia Deshmukh	K. Vijaya Bhaskar	Remake of Nuvve Kavali
2003	Ananda	Kannada	Naveen Mayur, Ruthika	Vara Mullapudi	
2003	Oka Raju Oka Rani	Telugu	Ravi Teja, Namitha	Yogie	
2003	Ooh La La	Kannada	Krishnamohan	Hemanth Hegde	
2003	Toli Choopulone	Telugu	Nandamuri Kalyan Ram, Akanksha	Y. Kasi Viswanath	
2003	Inidhu Inidhu Kadhal Inidhu	Tamil	Jai Akash, Neha	Sakthi Chidambaram	Remake of Anandam
2004	Anandamanandamaye	Telugu	Jai Akash, Renuka Menon	Srinu Vaitla	
2004	Thoda Tum Badlo Thoda Hum	Hindi	Arya Babbar, Shriya Saran	Esmayeel Shroff	
2006	Veedhi	Telugu	Sharwanand, Gopika	V. Dorairaj	
2007	Sixer	Kannada	Prajwal Devaraj, Devaki	Shashank	
2008	Nachavule	Telugu	Tanish, Maadhavi Latha	Ravi Babu	
2009	Ninnu Kalisaka	Telugu	Santosh Samrat, Chaitanya Krishna, Dipa Shah, Piaa Bajpai, Jagapati Babu	Siva Nageswara Rao	
2009	Savaari	Kannada	Srinagar Kitty, Raghu Mukherjee, Kamalini Mukherjee, Suman Ranganathan	Jacob Verghese	Remake of Gamyam; Co Production with Arka Media Works
2010	Betting Bangaraju	Telugu	Allari Naresh, Nidhi	E.Sattibabu	
2011	Nuvvila	Telugu	Avish, Ajay, Prasad Barve, Vijay Sai, Yami Gautam, Sarayu, Remya Nambeesan	Ravi Babu	
2015	Beeruva	Telugu	Sundeep Kishan, Surabhi	Kanmani	Co Production with Anandi Art Creations
2015	Dagudumootha Dandakor	Telugu	Rajendra Prasad, Sara Arjun	R.K Malineni	Remake of Saivam; Co Production with First Frame Entertainment

== TV serials ==
Year	Serial	Language	Actors	Director	Network	Notes
1995 – 1999	Sneha	Telugu	Kaveri	Vamsy	ETV	
1997 – 1997	Popula Pette	Telugu	Naresh, Kinnera, Dharmavarapu Subramanyam, Sakshi Ranga Rao	Jandhyala	ETV	
1997 – 2001	Antharangalu	Telugu	Sarath Babu, Kinnera, Kalpana, Achyuth	Vinay Kumar	ETV	Co-produced with Eenadu Television
1997 – 1999	Anveshitha	Telugu	Achyuth, Yamuna, Raja, Shanmukha Srinivas	Ilyas Ahmed "Pradyumna"	ETV	Co-produced with Eenadu Television
2003 – 2007	Panchatantram	Telugu			ETV	

== Associated talent ==
This is a list of notable people introduced by Usha Kiran Movies.

Year	Cast	Film name	Debut as	Note
1984	Shankar Melkote	Srivariki Premalekha	Actor	
1984	Sudha Chandran	Mayuri	Actress	
1989	Vinod Kumar	Mouna Poratam	Actor	Debut in Telugu
1989	Yamuna	Mouna Poratam	Actress	Debut in Telugu
1990	M. M. Keeravani	Manasu Mamatha	Music Director	
1990	Tarun Kumar	Manasu Mamatha	Child Actor	
1991	Ashwini Nachappa	Aswini	Actress	
1991	Srikanth	People's Encounter	Actor	
2000	Teja	Chitram	Director	
2000	Uday Kiran	Chitram	Actor	
2000	Reemma Sen	Chitram	Actress	
2000	Saandip	Chitram	Playback singer	
2000	Chitram Srinu	Chitram	Actor	
2000	Ravi Prakash	Subhavela	Actor	
2000	Richa Pallod	Nuvve Kavali	Actress	Debut in Telugu
2000	Sai Kiran	Nuvve Kavali	Actor	
2001	Rekha Vedavyas	Chitra	Actress	
2001	Shriya Saran	Ishtam	Actress	
2002	Jennifer Kotwal	Manasuvunte Chalu	Actress	Debut in Telugu
2002	Prakash Kovelamudi	Neetho	Actor	
2002	Mahek Chahal	Neetho	Actress	
2002	Radhika Kumaraswamy	Ninagagi	Actress	
2003	Riteish Deshmukh	Tujhe Meri Kasam	Actor	
2003	Genelia D'Souza	Tujhe Meri Kasam	Actress	
2007	Prajwal Devaraj	Sixer	Actor	
2008	Maadhavi Latha	Nachavule	Actress	
2009	Chaitanya Krishna	Ninnu Kalisaka	Actor	
2009	Dipa Shah	Ninnu Kalisaka	Actress	
2009	Piaa Bajpai	Ninnu Kalisaka	Actress	Debut in Telugu
2011	Yami Gautam	Nuvvila	Actress	Debut in Telugu
2015	Sara Arjun	Dagudumootha Dandakor	Child Actress	Debut in Telugu
2015	Surabhi	Beeruva	Actress	Debut in Telugu

== Awards ==
Ceremony	Year	Category	Nominee	Result
National Film Awards	2000	Best Feature Film Telugu	Nuvve Kavali	Won
Filmfare Awards South	1985	Filmfare Award for Best Film – Telugu	Pratighatana	Won
Filmfare Awards South	2000	Filmfare Award for Best Film – Telugu	Nuvve Kavali	Won
Nandi Awards	1984	Best Feature Film - Silver	Kanchana Ganga	Won
Nandi Awards	1985	Best Feature Film - Gold	Mayuri	Won
Nandi Awards	1985	Second Best Story Writer; Usha kiran Movies Unit	Mayuri	Won
Nandi Awards	1989	Best Feature Film - Silver	Mouna Poratam	Won
Nandi Awards	1991	Best Feature Film - Bronze	Aswini	Won
Nandi Awards	1992	Best Children Film - Gold	Teja	Won
