= Panchatantra (disambiguation) =

Panchatantra is an ancient Indian collection of interrelated animal fables in Sanskrit attributed to Vishnu Sharma.

Panchatantra may also refer to:

- List of Panchatantra stories

== Entertainment and media ==
=== Film ===
- Panchatanthiram, a 2002 Tamil film by K. S. Ravikumar
- Panchatantra (film), a 2019 Kannada film by Yogaraj Bhat
- Panchathantram, a 2022 Telugu film by Harsha Pulipaka

=== Television ===
- Panchatantram, a Telugu children's television series
