= Anandamanandamaye =

- Directed by: Srinu Vaitla
- Written by: Srinu Vaitla; Diwakar Babu
- Produced by: Ramoji Rao
- Starring: Akash; Renuka Menon; J. D. Chakravarthy; Preeti Jhangiani
- Cinematography: Ajayan Vincent
- Edited by: Marthand K. Venkatesh
- Music by: Koti
- Production company: Ushakiran Movies
- Release date: 6 February 2004
- Running time: 125 minutes
- Country: India
- Language: Telugu

Anandamanandamaye is a 2004 Indian Telugu-language romantic comedy drama film directed by Srinu Vaitla and produced by Ramoji Rao. It was released on 5 February 2004 under the banner of Ushakiran Movies. The film featured Akash and Renuka Menon, J. D. Chakravarthy, Preeti Jhangiani, Venu Madhav and M. S. Narayana. Background score and soundtrack were composed by Koti.

== Cast ==
- Akash as Kiran
- Renuka Menon as Bhuvaneshwari "Bhuvana"
- J. D. Chakravarthy as Chakravarti "Chakri"
- Preeti Jhangiani as Maheshwari "Mahi"
- Devan as Bhuvana's father
- Sumalatha as Bhuvana's maternal aunt
- Sudhakar as Bullebbayi
- Sivaji Raja as Bhuvana's paternal uncle
- Sumithra as Bhuvana's mother
- Rajya Lakshmi as Bullebbayi's wife
- Hema as Lakshmi
- A. V. S.
- Venu Madhav as Ammi Raju
- M. S. Narayana as Gavarraju
- Sunil as "Panchatantram" Seenu
- Dharmavarapu Subramanyam as Manmatha Rao
- Kondavalasa Lakshmana Rao as Lakshmana Rao
- Nutan Prasad as Judge
- Banerjee as lawyer
- Gautam Raju as T. C.
- Jenny
- Jaya Prakash Reddy as Police Inspector
- Melkote
- Sudeepa Pinky as Bhuvana's cousin
- Baby Zeeba as Bhuvana's cousin
- Master Bharath as Pattabhi

== Production ==
After the success of Anandam (2002), Srinu Vaitla, Ramoji Rao, and Akash collaborated again for this film.

== Music ==
The background score and soundtrack were composed by Koti, with lyrics by Sirivennela Seetharama Sastry, Veturi, Sai Sriharsha, and Kandi Konda. The singers were Sreerama Chandra, Sunitha, Karthik, Raghu Kunche, Malathi, Shreya Ghoshal and Koti.

No.	Title	Length
1.	"Neeko Maatundi"	3:23
2.	"Nee Kannulaloni"	3:45
3.	"Nadilo Alale"	4:32
4.	"Melukone Kalalu"	4:37
5.	"Maa Madhu"	5:55
6.	"Aagaali Kaalam"	4:21

== Release ==
A critic from Sify opined that "A feel-good family drama about mistaken identities similar to Chitchor and the recent Main Prem Ki Deewani Hoon. Director Seenu Vytla has handled the subject with streaks of comedy and has been successful to some extent but the flashbacks are too lengthy and on the whole the film is far from entertaining". Jeevi of Idlebrain gave the film a rating of three out of five and opined that "This film is a typical feel-good movie". Telugu Cinema wrote "There is no story in the first half of the movie, and the narration slow. The story part of JD Chakravarthy’s flashback is illogical. There is very less entertainment in the movie. Photography, Locations and lead artistes’ performance is the only plus points of the movie".
