= Deevinchandi =

2001 Telugu film directed by Muthyala Subbaiah

- Directed by: Muthyala Subbaiah
- Screenplay by: Muthyala Subbaiah
- Story by: Ghatikachalam
- Produced by: Ramoji Rao
- Starring: Srikanth; Raasi; Malavika
- Music by: S. A. Rajkumar
- Production company: Ushakiran Movies
- Release date: 23 March 2001
- Country: India
- Language: Telugu

Deevinchandi is a 2001 Indian Telugu language film directed by Muthyala Subbaiah and produced by Ramoji Rao under Ushakiran Movies. The film stars Srikanth, Raasi and Malavika.

== Plot ==
This story revolves around Siva, a lorry driver, who accidentally meets Lakshmi, an innocent and studious girl. Siva learns that Lakshmi's father is forcing her into an unwanted marriage and discovers that his best friend Satish has genuine feelings for Lakshmi. In an attempt to help his friend, Siva abducts Lakshmi to prevent her forced marriage but later realizes Satish's intentions are not pure. Siva returns Lakshmi to the marriage podium, but she is falsely accused and her reputation is tarnished. Feeling responsible for Lakshmi's plight, Siva decides to marry her. However, her father disowns her, and they embark on a journey to start a new life.

On their way, Satish tries to assault Lakshmi, and she defends herself with a knife, killing Satish. Siva takes the blame for the crime and is sentenced to five years in prison. Meanwhile, Lakshmi gives birth to their child while grieving the loss of her father. Her younger sister, Swetha, takes care of the baby and develops animosity towards Siva.

Once released from prison, Siva tries to reunite with his child, but Swetha refuses to give custody, believing Siva to be an irresponsible father. The court rules in Siva's favor, and he gets custody of his son. However, Swetha proposes marriage to Siva for the sake of the child's happiness. They get married, but Swetha soon files for divorce, claiming harassment. The story takes predictable turns before reaching a stereotypical climax.

== Cast ==
- Srikanth as Siva
- Raasi as Lakshmi
- Malavika as Swetha
- Master Sajja Teja as Siva's son
- Narra Venkateswara Rao as Police officer
- Brahmanandam
- Suthi Velu
- M. S. Narayana
- AVS

== Production ==
It was announced in 2001 that Ramoji Rao would be producing a film with Muthyala Subbaiah. The film was launched on 29 October 2000 at the office of Ushakiran Movies. This was 50th production of Ushakiran Movies.

== Music ==
Deevinchandi

Soundtrack album by S. A. Rajkumar
- Released: 2001

The music was composed by S. A. Rajkumar.

Sno	Song title	Singers
1	Ori Brahmachari	Sukhwinder Singh, S. A. Rajkumar
2	Paruvala Pavurama	S. P. Balasubrahmanyam, Chithra
3	Sandhya Ragamlo	Harini
4	Velugulu Nimpe	Rajesh
5	Chilakamma Chilakamma	S. P. Balasubrahmanyam, Mahalakshmi Iyer
6	Ammammo Chaligavundi	Sukhwinder Singh, Mahalakshmi Iyer

== Reception ==
Idlebrain wrote "Muthyala Subbaiah seems to have lost his touch off late. The way he directed this film is haphazard and you cannot expect this kind of lousy job from an experienced director like him. He has chosen a story that is full of sentiments and woven a unrelated and unimaginative comedy track and insipid songs around it". Full Hyderabad wrote "Mutyala Subbaiah, weaves such a confusing and contrived drama harping on middle class values that you begin to wonder how the minds of even successful film-makers lose all understanding of the basic principle of any-wood - that people come to films to get entertained for a couple of hours". Andhra Today wrote "Muthyala Subbaiah who is adept at direction and good choice of stories seems to have utterly failed on both counts". Telugu Cinema wrote "Telugu films are becoming far removed from reality of life. Particularly the films made in the name of family drama are depicting and trying to convince the audience most absurd and impossible situations. Deevinchandi by ace director on family drama is one such film with a prolonged story line that is just inconceivable". Indiainfo wrote "A meaningless story with abrupt twists and turns. A total failure and not at all worth watching. Less said the better!".
