= Mayuri (film) =

- Poster
- Directed by: Singeetam Srinivasa Rao
- Written by: Singeetam Srinivasa Rao; Ganesh Patro
- Produced by: Ramoji Rao
- Starring: Sudha Chandran
- Cinematography: Srihari Anumolu
- Music by: S. P. Balasubrahmanyam
- Production company: Ushakiran Movies
- Release date: 8 March 1985
- Running time: 142 minutes
- Country: India
- Language: Telugu

Mayuri (transl. Peacock) is a 1985 Indian Telugu-language biographical dance film directed by Singeetam Srinivasa Rao and produced by Ramoji Rao. Based on the life of Sudha Chandran, the film stars her in the title role while P. L. Narayana, Nirmalamma, Y. Vijaya, Potti Prasad, K. K. Sharma, S. R. Raju and Suthi Veerabhadra Rao played supporting roles.

The film was premiered at the 1985 10th IFFI, and retrospectively at the 45th IFFI in the Celebrating Dance in Indian cinema section. The film won 14 Nandi Awards the most by any other Telugu film. It was dubbed into Malayalam and Tamil as Mayoori, and remade as Naache Mayuri (1986) in Hindi.

== Plot ==
Mayuri is the real-life story of classical dancer Sudha Chandran, who lost her right leg in an accident on her way from Trichy to Madras in June 1981. The story depicts how she gets a Jaipur foot and fights her way back as a dancer and succeeds in life.

== Cast ==
- Sudha Chandran as Mayuri Olpam
- Veeramachaneni Subhakar as Mohan
- P. L. Narayana as Mayuri's father
- Nirmalamma as Mayuri's grandmother
- Y. Vijaya as Mayuri's stepmother
- Chakri Toleti as Mayuri's stepbrother
- Suthi Veerabhadra Rao as Mayuri's best friend
- Potti Prasad as Police Officer
- P. R. Varalakshmi
- Mukku Raju

== Production ==
=== Origin ===
In May 1981, at about 16 years old, in Tamil Nadu, Sudha Chandran met with an accident in which her legs were wounded. She received initial medical treatment of her injuries at a local hospital and was later admitted to Vijaya Hospital at Madras. After doctors discovered that gangrene had formed on her right leg, amputation was required. Chandran says that this period was the toughest time of her life. She subsequently regained some mobility with the help of a prosthetic Jaipur foot. She returned to dancing after a gap of two years and performed in India, Saudi Arabia, United States, UK, Canada, UAE, Qatar, Kuwait, Bahrain, Yemen and Oman.

=== Development ===
The film's producer Ramoji Rao who came across this story in an article from Anand Bazaar newspaper asked Atluri Ramarao to gather information about the dancer as he felt the subject had the potential to be made into a film to inspire lot of people. Ramarao approached writer Ganesh Patro to develop a story on this idea. Patro wrote the dialogues who also co-wrote the screenplay with Singeetham Srinivasa Rao. He took only the basic plot of the dancer succeeding against the odds and added characters such as P. L. Narayana and Nirmalamma who is inspired from Patro's grandmother. The film's cinematography and editing was handled by Hari Anumolu and Gautam Raju.

=== Casting ===
Ramoji Rao chose Singeetham Srinivasa Rao as director who suggested Sudha Chandran to enact her character onscreen. Though they were excited by the idea but were unsure "if we could find and convince her or that her performance would be impressive" hence they were in search of girls from dance schools for the lead role and found one for it. After tracing Chandran's family, Singeetham who gathered information about the incident from her decided Sudha for the role due to her expressive face. The voice for Chandran was given by actress Saritha. It became the first Indian film where a person appeared in a film based on their life. Doctors P. K. Sethi and Kasiwala who operated prosthetic foot on Chandran appeared in the film as themselves.

=== Filming ===
The film was launched on 10 November 1984 where the first shot was taken on Chandran, Baby Varalakshmi, Chakri Toleti at the office of Ushakiron Movies. The song "Gaurishankara" was shot at Govind Dev Temple, Amberpore Palace, Ramgadh Dam, Rambagh Palace, and the rest of the song was shot at Golconda Fort while the song "Mounam Gaanam" was shot at Galta. The climax was shot at Atluri Purnachandra Rao's guesthouse in Madras.

== Soundtrack ==
The music was composed by S. P. Balasubrahmanyam and the Telugu lyrics were written by Veturi and Tamil lyrics were written by Vaali. The song "Ee Paadam" was reused as "Pag Paadam" in the film's Hindi remake Naache Mayuri.

Song	Singers
"Ee Paadam"	S. P. Sailaja
"Gourisankara Sringam"	S. Janaki, Chorus
"Idi Naa Priya Narthana"	S. Janaki
"Kailasamlo Thaandavamaade"	S. Janaki, Chorus
"Mounam Gaanam Madhuram"	S. P. Balasubrahmanyam, S. Janaki, Chorus
"Vennello Muthyama"	S. P. Balasubrahmanyam, S. Janaki, Chorus

== Awards ==
Nandi Awards

- Best Feature Film - Gold - Ramoji Rao
- Best Director – Singeetam Srinivasa Rao
- Best Supporting Actress – G. Nirmalamma
- Best Screenplay Writer – Singeetham Srinivasa Rao, K. S. Prakash Rao & Ganesh Patro
- Best Cinematographer – Srihari Anumolu
- Best Music Director – S. P. Balasubrahmanyam
- Best Male Playback Singer – S. P. Balasubrahmanyam
- Best Editor – Gowtham Raju
- Best Art Director – V. Bhaskara Raju
- Best Choreographer – Seshu
- Best Audiographer – Yemmi
- Second Best Story Writer – Usha kiran Movies Unit
- Special Jury Award – Sudha Chandran
- Special Jury Award – P. L. Narayana

Filmfare Awards

- Best Director Telugu – Singeetam Srinivasa Rao (1985)

National Film Awards

- National Film Award – Special Jury Award for Sudha Chandran in 1985

== Critical reception ==
Reviewing Tamil dubbed version, Balumani of Anna praised acting, music and direction.
