= Tujhe Meri Kasam =

2003 Indian film by K. Vijaya Bhaskar

- Directed by: K. Vijaya Bhaskar
- Screenplay by: K. Vijaya Bhaskar
- Dialogues by: Neeraj Vora
- Story by: Iqbal Kuttippuram
- Based on: Niram by Kamal
- Produced by: Ramoji Rao; A. V. Rao
- Starring: Riteish Deshmukh; Genelia D'Souza; Shriya Saran
- Cinematography: Kabir Lal
- Edited by: A. Sreekar Prasad
- Music by: Viju Shah
- Production company: Ushakiran Movies
- Distributed by: True Entertainment Pvt. Ltd.
- Release date: January 3, 2003
- Running time: 155 minutes
- Country: India
- Language: Hindi
- Budget: ₹3.50 crore
- Box office: ₹14.36 crore (original run) ₹1 crore (re-release)

Tujhe Meri Kasam (English: swear on me) is a 2003 Hindi-language romantic drama film directed by K. Vijaya Bhaskar and produced by Ramoji Rao. The film stars debutants Riteish Deshmukh, Genelia D'Souza, and Shriya Saran (in her Hindi debut). It is a remake of the Malayalam film Niram. This film was nominated for several awards, including Deshmukh for the Filmfare Award for Best Male Debut. The film was a commercial success at the box office. Bipasha Basu made a cameo appearance and Isha Koppikar made an item number in this film.

== Plot ==
Rishi and Anju are childhood buddies. They were born on the same day, in the same hospital. Even their parents are best friends from their college years and are now neighbours. Rishi and Anju are inseparable, so much so that they study at the same college in the same class.

Akash, a very talented singer, develops feelings for Anju when she spontaneously sings with him at a college function. He, Anju, and others leave for Bangalore for a week to participate in a few inter-college competitions. As they are apart for the first time in their lives, Rishi starts missing Anju very badly, but does not understand his feelings. His maid Sarro, who often teases him and Anju, starts teasing him that he is missing her because he loves her. Slowly, with the maid's words, Rishi begins to realise that he loves her. He buys a gift and greeting card to express himself when she returns. Meanwhile, he sees a girl from his college slapping her friend because he said he loves her. She is in a distressed mood and says that such guys are a shame to friendship as they pretend to be friends but really have other intentions. She wishes that every guy could be like Rishi so that a girl and guy could be best friends without any worries. Rishi then feels that he should not tell Anju about his feelings lest she, too, react the same way. He feels that he can bear not to tell her about his love but cannot imagine losing her friendship.

Anju returns from Bangalore and tells Rishi that Akash proposed to her during their stay. She comes to his room to ask him what to reply and by mistake half opens the drawer in which he kept his greeting card and gift. He hurriedly closes it and asks her not to open it then tells her to agree to the proposal if she likes Akash. She agrees to his proposal. Later things start to get rough as Akash doesn't like the closeness Rishi and Anju share. When Akash and Anju are having a conversation and Rishi joins them, Akash asks him to leave as they need some privacy. Such actions greatly distress Anju and she warns him not to do it again, but Rishi explains that what Akash is doing is justifiable.

Akash's grandmother comes to Anju's house to arrange their marriage. Her parents agree and marriage preparations are well underway. It is decided that after marriage, Anju will leave with Akash to the USA where his family is settled. It is then that she realises this marriage means breaking her relationship with Rishi and leaving forever. She suddenly dislikes getting married and tries to talk to Rishi about it, but he casually says that it is all part of life and inevitable. She asks how can he talk so cold heartedly. She says she wishes she did not have to leave and wonders why she had to love Akash. She scolds him why he did not get the idea to love her in the first place. At this point Rishi, overcome by emotion, hugs Anju, cries and runs away from her.

Anju grows suspicious of his actions and remembers the drawer that he did not let her open. She goes to his room and is shocked to find the card and gift. She says that she does not want to marry Akash and will tell everyone about them. Rishi firmly refuses saying that their parents have given them unlimited freedom: It would be very hurtful, selfish and irresponsible of them to break their trust.

At his insistence she goes through the engagement ceremony. After the engagement, Rishi says that he has to go to a basketball match out of the state and will not be there for the marriage. The parents try to convince him, but he doesn't listen. Anju gives him a ride to the station and on the way they remember their childhood. At the station as Rishi is climbing aboard Anju weeps and holds him. He is unable to leave. At the house, the maid tells their parents everything and they come to the station. They find Anju and Rishi on the platform stairs and say that what they feel is not wrong, and it is the way of the world. They say that they shall cancel the marriage and ask them to come home.

== Cast ==
- Riteish Deshmukh as Rishikesh "Rishi" Bhosle
- Genelia D'Souza as Anjali "Anju" Khanna
- Shriya Saran as Girija
- Raja Bherwani as Akash Dixit
- Supriya Pilgaonkar as Sarro
- Satish Shah as Dr. Satish Khanna, Anju's father
- Umesh Tonpe as Rishi's college friend
- Sushma Seth as Akash's Grandmother
- Shakti Kapoor as Kailash Bhosle, Rishi's father
- Supriya Karnik as Rohini Bhosle, Rishi's mother
- Jaspal Bhatti as Sardarji
- Asrani as Principal
- Vijayendra Ghatge as Kashinath Dixit, Akash's father
- Chandan Kumar as Rishi's friend
- Suvendu Bal as stage singer
- Amit Satpathy as Bhakad sai baba
- Tinnu Anand as a jewellery shop owner (special appearance)
- Girija Shettar as herself, special appearance
- Bipasha Basu as Girija, special appearance
- Isha Koppikar as a dance number in the song Thodi Si Deewani
- Raju Pandit as a college dance group member

== Soundtrack ==
Tujhe Meri Kasam

Soundtrack album by Viju Shah
- Genre: Feature film soundtrack
- Label: Sony Music Entertainment

All lyrics are written by Mehboob; all music is composed by Viju Shah.

Songs
No.	Title	Playback	Length
1.	"Azaadi Hai Pyari"	Shaan, Shreya Ghoshal
2.	"Choti Choti Khushiyan"	Alka Yagnik, Abhijeet, Nisha Upadhayay
3.	"Koi To Meri Fariyad"	Udit Narayan, Sadhana Sargam
4.	"Main Rok Loon Tere"	Vishali Samant
5.	"Pal Pal Soch Mein"	Udit Narayan, Sadhana Sargam
6.	"Thodi Si Deewani"	Alka Yagnik

== Re-release ==
The film was re-released on 13 September 2024 in theatres. Tujhe Meri Kasam earned over ₹1 crore in its opening weekend.
