= Ashwini (film) =

- Directed by: T. S. B. K. Moulee
- Produced by: Atluri Rama Rao; Ramoji Rao
- Starring: Ashwini Nachappa; Bhanu Chander; Shashi Kumar; Saranya; Ramaraju; Shankar Melkote
- Edited by: D. Shyam Mukherjee
- Music by: M. M. Keeravani
- Distributed by: Ushakiran Movies
- Release date: 12 March 1991
- Country: India
- Language: Telugu

Ashwini is a 1991 Telugu biographical sports drama film based on the life of Ashwini Nachappa, an Indian athlete who was a national champion sprinter. The film was produced by Ramoji Rao, and directed by B. C. Mouli. It was featured in the 15th IFFI' 92 Indian Panorama section.

== Cast ==
- Ashwini Nachappa as Ashwini
- Bhanu Chander as Prabhakar
- Shashikumar as Chandu
- Saranya Ponvannan
- Ramaraju as Joe
- Shankar Melkote
- Vallabhaneni Janardhan
- C. V. L. Narasimha Rao
- Kadambari Kiran
- Gautham Raju
- Y. Vijaya

== Soundtrack ==
Soundtrack was composed by M. M. Keeravaani where all lyrics were written by Veturi.

Track list
No.	Title	Singer(s)	Length
1.	"Oh Lady Chikkavela"	S. P. Balasubrahmanyam	3:58
2.	"Saana Pattu Pattukunte"	K. S. Chithra	4:15
3.	"Chey Jagamu Marachi"	S. P. Balasubrahmanyam, K. S. Chithra	4:16
4.	"Mohana Ragam"	S. P. Balasubrahmanyam, K. S. Chithra	4:03
Total length:			16:33

== Awards ==
Nandi Awards

- Third Best Feature Film - Bronze - Ramoji Rao
