= Mouna Poratam =

- Directed by: Mohan Gandhi
- Produced by: Ramoji Rao
- Starring: Yamuna, Vinod Kumar Alva
- Music by: S. Janaki
- Production company: Ushakiran Movies
- Release date: 1989 (India)
- Country: India
- Language: Telugu

Mouna Poratam (The Silent War or The Silent Struggle) is a 1989 Indian drama film directed by Mohan Gandhi, starring debutants Yamuna and Vinod Kumar, with music composed by S. Janaki. The movie is based on the real-life story of Sabita Badhei, which gained massive media coverage. It tells the story of a tribal girl, Durga (portrayed by Yamuna), who is betrayed by a government officer and fights for her conjugal rights, seeking marital recognition to give proper identity to her illegitimate child. The government intervenes to appoint a Lok Adalat to give speedy justice in this case. Produced by Ushakiran Movies, the film won two Nandi Awards. A sequel for the film, in the form of TV serial, began airing from 4 April 2022 on ETV under the same title.

== Cast ==
- Yamuna as Durga
- Vinod Kumar Alva as Rajasekharam
- Kota Srinivasa Rao
- Mallikarjuna Rao
- Rallapalli
- Narra Venkateswara Rao
- Prasad Babu
- Suthi Velu
- Kallu Chidambaram
- Vidyasagar
- Pavala Shyamala
- Kakinada Shyamala
- Mucherla Aruna
- Rajyalakshmi

== Soundtrack ==
Mouna Poratam

Soundtrack album by S. Janaki
- Released: 1989
- Recorded: 1988–1989
- Label: AVM Audio

All music is composed by S. Janaki.

No.	Title	Lyrics	Vocals	Length
1.	"Lolilita Lolilita"	Veturi Sundararamamurthy	S. Janaki & S. P. Balasubrahmanyam
2.	"Dora Rakakosam"	Veturi Sundararamamurthy	S. Janaki
3.	"Jumbare Jumbare"	Jalaadi	S. Janaki & S. P. Balasubrahmanyam
4.	"Yala Yalaga"	Veturi Sundararamamurthy	S. Janaki
5.	"Ye Bapu Neerpinidi"	Veturi Sundararamamurthy	S. Janaki
6.	"Lolilita Lolilita"	Veturi Sundararamamurthy	S. Janaki & S. P. Balasubrahmanyam

== Awards ==
Nandi Awards

- Second Best Feature Film - Silver - Ramoji Rao (1989)
- Best Costume Designer - Kondaiyya
