= Moodu Mukkalata =

- Movie Poster
- Directed by: K. Raghavendra Rao
- Written by: Janardhana Maharshi (story / dialogues)
- Screenplay by: K. Raghavendra Rao
- Produced by: Ramoji Rao
- Starring: Jagapati Babu; Rambha; Soundarya; Raasi
- Cinematography: V. Srinivasa Reddy
- Edited by: Gautham Raju
- Music by: M. M. Srilekha
- Production company: Ushakiran Movies
- Release date: 1 September 2000
- Running time: 145 mins
- Country: India
- Language: Telugu

Moodu Mukkalata (transl. Three card poker) is a 2000 Telugu-language romantic comedy film, produced by Ramoji Rao under the Ushakiran Movies banner and directed by K. Raghavendra Rao. It stars Jagapati Babu, Rambha, Soundarya, Raasi and music composed by M. M. Srilekha.

== Cast ==
- Jagapati Babu as Shanti Swaroop
- Rambha as Lahari
- Soundarya as Sravani
- Raasi as Aliveni
- Prakash Raj as Paramahamsa
- Nassar as Yugandhar Prasad
- Tanikella Bharani as Barrela Bala Raju
- Sudhakar as Pandu
- Brahmanandam as priest
- M. S. Narayana as Bala Raju's assistant
- A.V.S. as Gottam Govinda Raju
- L.B. Sriram as Yugandhar's assistant
- Raja Ravindra as Lecturer Nivas
- Chitti Babu as priest
- Gundu Sudharshan as Bala Raju's assistant
- Uttej as Student
- Annapoorna as Shanti Swaroop's mother
- Priya as Paramahamsa's wife
- Varsha as Bhaskara Lakshmi
- Sana as Amrita
- Delhi Rajeswari as Bala Raju's wife

== Soundtrack ==
Moodu Mukkalata

Film score by M. M. Srilekha
- Released: 2000
- Genre: Soundtrack
- Length: 24:21
- Label: Mayuri Audio
- Producer: M. M. Srilekha

M. M. Srilekha chronology
Preyasi Rave (1999)	Moodu Mukkalata (2000)	Preminchu (2001)

Music composed by M. M. Srilekha. Music released on Mayuri Audio Company. The audio was released on 28 July 2000 at Mayuri films office.

No.	Title	Lyrics	Singer(s)	Length
1.	"Chinavaada Chinavaada"	Chandrabose	Mano, Nithyasree Mahadevan	5:41
2.	"Palakova"	Veturi	S. P. Balasubrahmanyam, Chitra	4:34
3.	"Prema Prema Andi"	Chandrabose	Sukhwinder Singh, Sujatha	4:36
4.	"Raashi Chooste"	Sirivennela Sitarama Sastry	Udit Narayan, Chitra	3:49
5.	"Prema Vikramarkudu"	Chandrabose	S. P. Balasubrahmanyam, Vasundhara Das	4:53
6.	"Vaana Kanyaka"	Veturi	S. P. Balasubrahmanyam, Chitra	4:48
Total length:				24:21

== Reception ==
Jeevi of Idlebrain wrote "This film is a cakewalk for Raghavendra Rao. He stuffed this film with all commercial elements and glamour (fruits, flowers, pots along with the heroines, that is!)". Andhra Today wrote "Tormented hero and two heroines have become routine ingredients of a love triangle and as a seeker of variety, the director has introduced three heroines which don't seem to make much dent in making the movie a hit. Although the first half is racy with love sequences in the backdrop of the college, rest of it goes on in quite a routine manner". Indiainfo wrote "The film is watchable for the entertaining pace maintained throughout by the director. Coming to the acting credits, all the lead actors have done their part well, having done such roles many times before. Photography by Srinivas Reddy is the highlight of the film. Srilekha has come out with some hum able tunes and they are well picturised, especially the song, Premavikramarkudu aided by excellent graphics from Mantra, the graphics department of Ramoji Film City. Janardhan Maharshi’s dialogues have the required punch".
