= Teja (film) =

- Directed by: N. Hari Babu
- Screenplay by: N. Hari Babu; Bollimuntha Nageswara Rao
- Dialogues by: Sathyanand
- Story by: N. Hari Babu
- Produced by: Ramoji Rao; Atluri Rama Rao
- Starring: Tarun Kumar; Kumar Bangarappa; Shari; Prasad Rayala
- Cinematography: K. S. Hari
- Edited by: Gautham Raju
- Music by: M. M. Keeravani
- Production company: Ushakiran Movies
- Distributed by: Mayuri Films
- Release date: 1992
- Running time: 2:10:49
- Country: India
- Language: Telugu

Teja is a 1992 Indian Telugu language children's film written and directed by N. Hari Babu. Produced by Ramoji Rao, under Ushakiran Movies, the film starred Tarun in the titular role. Upon release, the film received positive reviews, and won three state Nandi Awards.

== Plot ==
This story is about child prodigy Teja who is at his 6th standard preparing for 10th class. Being an enthusiast of science, history, photography, music, computers and robotics, he makes pranks on his peers and helpers at home. One day he is expelled from the class by his teacher in front of his vice-principal Sarada because of his incomplete homework. Though Teja explains well about the subject, he is expelled from the class on the grounds of mischief.

Amazed by his knowledge, Sarada recommends Teja to 10th class. Later Teja befriends a journalist called Jagan, who admires his intelligence and takes his help in several circumstances. One day in a school excursion, Sarada witnesses a murder of a woman done by her ex-husband Vinod who is a womanizer. This is unknown to Teja, who is clicking the pictures of nature. Vinod chases them to kill, with a hard run, Sarada manages to reach her bus safely along with Teja. Later, Teja reminds her of her duty as a teacher. Then Sarada gains courage and arrests Vinod. Later Vinod bribes a constable and comes out from the police station illegally and kills Sarada by pouring acid at her school lab. Then at the judgement, Teja submits the secondary evidence i.e. the photograph of murder which he has clicked through his camera unknowingly, meanwhile the cop who bribed by Vinod becomes approver in the Sarada's murder case. then the judge sentences Vinod to death.

Later, Vinod avenges on Teja to kill him and escapes from prison. Meanwhile, at Teja's home with the help of Teja his sister's marriage preparations are done and all went to Tirupati, in confusion, Teja is left at home which is locked. At the same time two thieves enter his house unknowingly (once Teja teaches them a lesson for stealing Jagan's wallet). Meanwhile, Vinod enters Teja's home to escape from cops and is waiting for his arrival to kill him. Unknown of all these facts Teja stays at his home alone with his pet. After lot of chaos they all realise they were in a dangerous play. Vinod ties up the thieves and searches for Teja. Then Teja retorted back with his electronic gadgets and arranges a deadly trap for Vinod to stop him. Then as Vinod is about to kill Teja, cops surround him along with Teja's parents and Jagan. Then Vinod is arrested again.

In the final the film ends with Teja winning the National Bravery Award.

== Cast ==
- Master Tarun as Teja
- Kumar Bangarappa
- Shari as Sarada
- Sudha as Teja's mother
- Ananth Babu
- Sudhakar
- C. V. L. Narasimha Rao
- Veturi (special appearance)
- Prasad Rayala
- R. V. Prasad
- Srinivasa Rao
- Sanjeevi
- Yuvarani
- Sadhana
- Poojitha

== Production ==
The films production design is handled by Bhaskara Raju, and was shot in Jubilee Hills, Madhapur, Nanakramguda, St. Ann's High school, Vivekananda Public school, St. Mark's High school, and Directorate of archaeology and museums in Hyderabad.

== Soundtrack ==
The music was composed by M.M. Keeravani and lyrics were written by Veturi and audio was bought by Lahari Music.

Track listing
No.	Title	Lyrics	Singer(s)	Length
1.	"Vaanavillu Ekkupetti"	Veturi	S. P. Balasubrahmanyam, K. S. Chitra
2.	"Ee Sarigama Saradaa Yaatralo"	Veturi	K. S. Chitra, Sunanda
3.	"Shree Dhana Kanaka Tailaadi"	Veturi	S. P. Balasubrahmanyam, S.P. Sailaja
4.	"Siggochhinda chiguraakula"	Veturi	S.P. Balasubramaniam, K. S. Chitra

== Awards ==
Nandi Awards - 1992

- Best Children's Film - Gold - Ramoji Rao
- Best Child Actor - Tarun
- Best Villain - R. V. Prasad

== Home media ==
The film was premiered on ETV WIN App in 2019.
