= Beeruva =

- Theatrical release poster
- Directed by: Kanmani
- Written by: Kanmani
- Produced by: Ramoji Rao
- Starring: Sundeep Kishan; Surbhi; Mukesh Rishi
- Cinematography: Chota K. Naidu
- Edited by: Marthand K. Venkatesh
- Music by: S. Thaman
- Production company: Ushakiran Movies
- Distributed by: Ushakiran Movies
- Release date: 23 January 2015
- Running time: 141 minutes
- Country: India
- Language: Telugu
- Box office: ₹10 crore

Beeruva (transl. Closet) is a 2015 Indian Telugu-language romantic comedy film featuring Sundeep Kishan and Surbhi in the lead roles and directed by Kanmani. The film was later dubbed into Hindi as Mera Faisla in 2016. The film was a commercial success grossing over ₹10 crore at the box office and collecting a distributor's share of ₹6 crore.

== Plot ==
Sanju, a carefree youngster with a master's degree, has little interest in joining his father Suryanarayana's business. Since childhood, Sanju has been fond of his almirah, often using it as a hiding place. His life takes a turn when he meets Swathi, who captivates him at first sight. However, Swathi is angered upon learning his true identity.

Sanju remains determined to win her love, despite the obstacles posed by her father Adikesavulu, a powerful don involved in crime and politics. Against all odds, Sanju ventures into Adikesavulu's household, leading to a series of confrontations. His father is left shocked when Sanju reveals his love for the don's daughter and is further shaken by an unexpected discovery in Sanju's car. Throughout the story, the almirah that Sanju cherished in his childhood re-emerges as a key element in his quest to achieve his goal.

== Cast ==
- Sundeep Kishan as Sanju
- Surbhi as Swathi
- Naresh as Suryanarayana, Sanju's father
- Mukesh Rishi as Adikesavulu, Swathi's father
- Saptagiri
- Ajay
- Sivannarayana Naripeddi
- Shakalaka Shankar
- Venu Yeldandi

== Soundtrack ==
The soundtrack was composed by S. Thaman.

Beeruva

Soundtrack album by S. Thaman
- Released: 2014
- Genre: Feature film soundtrack
- Language: Telugu

S. Thaman chronology
| Tamizhuku En Ondrai Azhuthavum (2014) | Beeruva (2014) | Tiger (2015) |

| No. | Song title | Singers |
|---|---|---|
| 1 | By By By Cheppai | Nivas |
| 2 | Chinnadana Chinnadana | Naveen Madhav, M. M. Monisha |
| 3 | Cheliya Cheliya | Deepak, M. M. Manasi |
| 4 | Pisthol Bava | Mallikarjun, Pooja |

== Critical reception ==
The Times of India wrote "Beeruva is quite an entertainer, largely because of a well-scripted characterization for Sundeep Kishan’s role." Idlebrain wrote "Films like these should run of tight screenplay. It was the good screenplay that made Venkadri Express work big time, But, Beeruva didn’t boast of a good screenplay. We have to wait and see how family audiences embrace the movie."
