= Pratighatana =

- Theatrical release poster
- Directed by: T. Krishna
- Written by: T. Krishna; M. V. S. Haranatha Rao (dialogues)
- Story by: T. Krishna
- Produced by: Ramoji Rao
- Starring: Vijayshanti; Chandra Mohan; Kota Srinivasa Rao; Sai Kumar; P. L. Narayana; Charan Raj; Suthi Velu; Rajasekhar; Narra Venkateswara Rao; Y. Vijaya
- Music by: K. Chakravarthy
- Production company: Ushakiran Movies
- Release date: 11 October 1985
- Country: India
- Language: Telugu

Pratighatana (transl. Resistance) is a 1985 Indian Telugu-language action drama film written and directed by T. Krishna. The film is produced by Ramoji Rao under Ushakiran Movies. The plot follows a woman's fight against corruption and criminalization of politics in India. The film stars Vijayshanti alongside Chandra Mohan, Kota Srinivasa Rao, Sai Kumar, P. L. Narayana, Charan Raj, Suthi Velu, Rajasekhar, Narra Venkateswara Rao, and Y. Vijaya who appear in supporting roles. Music is composed by K. Chakravarthy.

The film is released on 11 October 1985. It was premiered at International Film Festival of India and has garnered the Filmfare Best Film Award (Telugu). The film won six Nandi Awards and two Filmfare Awards South (including Best Film –Telugu). The film was dubbed and released in Tamil as Poo Ondru Puyalanathu and in Malayalam as Pakarathinu Pakaram The film was remade in Hindi as Pratighaat while Charan Raj reprise his role in Hindi.

== Plot ==
Jhansi, wife of a lawyer Gopalakrishna, works as a college lecturer. The city life was always disrupted by a group of street criminals supported by the ruling party. These criminals humiliate Jhansi in front of a large crowd by stripping her nude on the street when she refuses to take back her complaint against the criminal Kali for murdering a police officer in public. Her husband remains helpless despite being a lawyer fearing of the consequences that they may face in future if they went to court for justice. Meanwhile, the leader of the criminals, the villain, gets elected to the legislative assembly and arranges an open meeting to celebrate his election. Jhansi kills the villain in that open meeting.

== Cast ==
- Vijayashanti as Jhansi, a college lecturer
- Chandra Mohan as Gopala Krishna, a lawyer
- Rajasekhar as Prakash, a police officer
- Charan Raj as Kalidasu, a criminal
- Kota Srinivasa Rao as a politician
- Rallapalli, a lawyer of Kali
- Suthivelu as Srisailam, a police constable
- Y. Vijaya
- Chitti Babu
- Narra Venkateswara Rao
- Vizag Prasad

== Production ==
Director Ravi Raja Pinisetty was originally offered the role of Charanraj however he turned down the offer.

== Soundtrack ==
All lyrics are written by Veturi.

No.	Title	Singer(s)	Length
1.	"Ee Dhuryodhana"	S. Janaki
2.	"Hechariko Hecharika"	S. P. Balasubrahmanyam
3.	"Vayasu Courtu"	S.P. Balasubrahmanyam, S. Janaki

== Reception ==
Reviewing Tamil dubbed version Poo Ondru Puyalanadhu, Balumani of Anna praised acting, dialogues and direction.

== Awards ==
Filmfare Awards South

- Filmfare Award for Best Telugu Film - Ramoji Rao
- Filmfare Award for best Telugu Actress - Vijayashanti

Nandi Awards

- Best Actress - Vijayashanti
- Best Villain - Charan Raj.
- Best Female Playback Singer - S. Janaki .
- Best Story Writer - T. Krishna.
- Best Dialogue Writer - M. V. S. Haranatha Rao
- Special Jury Award - Kota Srinivasa Rao
