= Daddy Daddy =

- Directed by: Kodi Ramakrishna
- Written by: L. B. Sriram (dialogues)
- Screenplay by: Kodi Ramakrishna
- Story by: Usha Kiran Unit
- Based on: Once More (Tamil)
- Produced by: Ramoji Rao
- Starring: Akkineni Nageswara Rao; Jayasudha; Harish; Raasi
- Cinematography: Kodi Lakshman Rao
- Edited by: Nandamuri Haribabu
- Music by: Vandemataram Srinivas
- Production company: Usha Kiran Movies
- Release date: 1 October 1998
- Running time: 143 minutes
- Country: India
- Language: Telugu

Daddy Daddy is a 1998 Indian Telugu-language comedy film, Produced by Ramoji Rao under the Usha Kiran Movies banner and directed by Kodi Ramakrishna. It stars Akkineni Nageswara Rao, Jayasudha, Harish, Raasi and music composed by Vandemataram Srinivas. The film is Akkineni Nageswara Rao's 250th movie. It is a remake of the Tamil film Once More (1997). The film was a box office success.

== Cast ==
- Akkineni Nageswara Rao as Anand Rao
- Jayasudha as Sarada
- Harish as Prasad
- Raasi as Subhadra / Subbu
- Ravali as Rajani
- Ali as Anji
- Costume Krishna
- Raghunath Reddy
- Sivaji Raja as Apco / Appala Konda
- L. B. Sriram
- Ananth
- Chitti Babu
- Gautham Raju
- K. K. Sarma
- Mithai Chitti
- Satti Babu

== Soundtrack ==
Daddy Daddy

Film score by Vandemataram Srinivas
- Released: 1998
- Genre: Soundtrack
- Length: 28:50
- Label: Mayuri Audio
- Producer: Vandemataram Srinivas

Vandemataram Srinivas chronology
Suprabhatam (1998)	Daddy Daddy (1998)	Aahaa..! (1998)

Music composed by Vandemataram Srinivas. Music released on Mayuri Audio Company.

No.	Title	Lyrics	Singer(s)	Length
1.	"Dil Tho Paagal"	Veturi	Swarnalatha, S. P. Balasubrahmanyam	5:08
2.	"Happygunnanu"	Sahithi	S. P. Balasubrahmanyam	4:41
3.	"Love Patalu"	Sirivennela Sitarama Sastry	S. P. B. Charan, S. P. Balasubrahmanyam	4:59
4.	"Andhamaina Guvvalu"	Sirivennela Sitarama Sastry	K. S. Chithra, S. P. Balasubrahmanyam, S. P. B Charan	4:39
5.	"Pyaar Kardho"	Sahithi	Malgudi Subha, S. P. Balasubrahmanyam	5:15
6.	"Jaangri Lanti Pilla"	Bhuvana Chandra	Mano, Swarnalatha	4:08

== Reception ==
Andhra Online wrote "On the whole the film has a message. One aimed straight at youth not to fritter away their time and also for women not to be headstrong".
