= Nuvve Kavali =

2000 Indian film directed by K. Vijaya Bhaskar

- Promotional poster
- Directed by: K. Vijaya Bhaskar
- Screenplay by: K. Vijaya Bhaskar
- Dialogues by: Trivikram Srinivas
- Story by: Iqbal Kuttippuram
- Based on: Niram
- Produced by: Ramoji Rao; Sravanthi Ravi Kishore
- Starring: Tarun; Richa Pallod; Sai Kiran; Varsha
- Cinematography: Hari Anumolu
- Edited by: A. Sreekar Prasad
- Music by: Koti
- Production company: Ushakiran Movies
- Distributed by: Ushakiran Movies
- Release date: 13 October 2000
- Running time: 146 minutes
- Country: India
- Language: Telugu
- Budget: ₹1.2 crore
- Box office: ₹20 crore distributors' share

Nuvve Kavali (transl. I want only you) is a 2000 Indian Telugu-language romantic comedy film directed by K. Vijaya Bhaskar and produced by Ramoji Rao under Ushakiran Movies. An official adaptation to the 1999 Malayalam film Niram, the film stars Tarun, Richa Pallod, Sai Kiran, and Varsha (the former three make their debuts in lead roles).

Nuvve Kavali was released on 13 October 2000 to widely positive reviews especially for its dialogues by Trivikram Srinivas, and the songs and background score by Koti. The film had an extremely successful theatrical run and went on to become the first Telugu film to collect a distributor's share of over ₹20 crore at the box office, emerging as an Industry Hit and the highest grossing Telugu film at the time of its release. To this day, the film holds the unique distinction of being the only modern day industry hit to have debutantes in its lead roles. Produced on a shoestring budget of ₹1.2 crore, and shot entirely in Ramoji Film City, Nuvve Kavali became a major sleeper hit and fetched the Best Telugu Feature Film award at the 48th National Film Awards. The film won four Filmfare Awards South, including Best Film – Telugu.

== Plot ==
Tarun and Madhu are childhood best friends. They were born on the same day, in the same hospital. Even their parents are best friends from their college years and are now neighbors. Tarun and Madhu are inseparable, so much so that they study in the same college in the same class. Everyone knows them to be just friends, except Varsha, the innocent and clumsy girl who has an enormous crush on Tarun. She notices his feelings towards Madhu and asks him about that, which he firmly and laughingly denies.

Another student Prakash, a very talented singer, develops feelings towards Madhu when she spontaneously sings along with him at a college function. He, Madhu and others leave for Bangalore for a week to participate in a few inter-college competitions. As they are apart for the first time in their lives, Tarun starts missing Madhu very badly, but does not understand his feelings. His maid Rukku, who often teases him and Madhu, starts teasing him that he is missing her because he loves her. Slowly, Tarun begins to realize that indeed, he loves her. He buys a gift and greeting card to express his feelings when she returns. Meanwhile, he sees a girl from his college slapping her friend because he proposed to her. She, in a distressed mood, says that such guys are a shame towards friendship as they pretend to be friends, but really have other intentions. She wishes that every guy could be like Tarun so that a girl and guy could be best friends without any worries. Tarun decides not to express his feelings to Madhu, lest she too react in the same way.

Madhu returns from Bangalore and tells Tarun that Prakash proposed to her during their stay. She comes to his room to ask him what to reply and by accidentally half opens the drawer in which he has kept his greeting card and gift. He hurriedly closes it and asks her not to open that and tells her to agree to the proposal if she likes Prakash. She finally agrees to Prakash's proposal, but later things start to get a little rough as Prakash doesn't like the intimacy Tarun and Madhu share.

Soon Prakash's grandmother comes to Madhu's house to set the date for their marriage and marriage preparations get underway. It is decided that after their marriage, Madhu will leave with Prakash to USA where his whole family is settled. It is then that she realises this marriage means breaking her relationship with Tarun and leaving forever. She suddenly dislikes getting married and tries to talk to Tarun about it. He casually says that it is all part of life and inevitable. She asks him how can he talk so cold-heartedly about something so important. She says she wishes she did not have to leave and wonders why she had to love Prakash. She scolds him why he did not get the idea to love her in the first place. At this point Tarun, ruled by emotions, hugs Madhu and cries and runs away from her.

Madhu grows suspicious of his actions and remembers the drawer which he did not let her open. She goes to his room and is shocked to find the card and gift. She says that she does not want to marry Prakash and will tell everyone about them. Tarun firmly refuses, saying that their parents have given them unlimited freedom and it would be very selfish and irresponsible of them to break their trust. At his insistence, she goes through with the engagement ceremony. After the engagement, Tarun says that he has to go to a basketball match out of the state and will not be there for the marriage. The parents try to convince him, but he doesn't listen. Madhu gives him a ride to the station and on the way they remember their entire childhood. At the station as Tarun is boarding the train, Madhu weeps and holds him. He is unable to leave. At the house, the maid tells their parents everything and they come to the station. They find Madhu and Tarun on the platform stairs and tell them that what they feel is not wrong and it is the way of the world. They assure the love birds that Madhu's marriage to Prakash will be cancelled and they would be together as they had always been.

== Cast ==
- Tarun as Tarun
- Richa Pallod as Madhu
- Sai Kiran as Prakash
- Varsha as Varsha
- Kovai Sarala as Rukku, Tarun's maid
- Giri Babu as Tarun's father
- Chalapathi Rao as Madhu's father
- Sunil as Sunil, Tarun's friend
- Vijay Sai as Tarun's friend
- M. S. Narayana as Lecturer
- Shankar Melkote as Tarun's north Indian neighbour
- Swapna as Journalist
- Sudha as Madhu's mother
- Delhi Rajeswari as Usha, Tarun's mother
- Rohit as Prakash's friend (cameo appearance)
- G. V. Narayana Rao as Varsha's father
- Annapoorna as Prakash's grandmother
- Laila in item number

== Production ==
Nuvve Kavali was a remake of Malayalam film Niram. Sravanthi Ravi Kishore produced the film along with Ramoji Rao. Sravanthi whose previous ventures didn't do well leading to losses revealed "As I was unable to do a film on my own, and I have the remake rights of the film Nuvve Kaavaali, I approached Ramoji Rao gaaru with the subject" who agreed to produce it. Tarun and Richa Pallod, who previously collaborated for a Fanta advert, debuted in the film as leads. After the success of their previous collaboration Swayamvaram (1999), Vijaya Bhaskar and Trivikram collaborated for second time with this film. Trivikram revealed he saw the original film and understood the essence and he "didn’t want transcript of Niram as I wanted to write dialogues afresh. I used only one dialogue ‘Nuvvendukuraa Naaku mundu I Love You cheppaledu’ (transl. Why didn't you say I love you to me before) from original as it is the key scene and incorporates the essence of the movie" and added "humor with the dialogues and incorporated few characters like that of Sunil".

== Soundtrack ==
The soundtrack was composed by Koti with two of the songs adapted from songs in original Malayalam version, which was composed by Vidyasagar. The song "Kallalloki Kallu Petti" was based on "Maataraani Mounamidi" from Maharshi (1987) since Ravi Kishore who's a big fan of that song requested Koti to use it. Lyrics were penned by Sirivennela Seetharama Sastry and Bhuvana Chandra.

Track Listing
| No. | Title | Lyrics | Singer(s) | Length |
|---|---|---|---|---|
| 1. | "Anaganaga Aakasam" (inspired from "Prayam Nammil Moham") | Sirivennela Seetharama Sastry | K. S. Chithra, P. Jayachandran |
| 2. | "Sukriya Sukriya" (reused from original) | Bhuvana Chandra | Koti, Sujatha |
| 3. | "Ammammalu Thathayyalu" | Bhuvana Chandra | Devan, Anuradha Sriram |
| 4. | "Yekkada Unna" | Sirivennela Seetharama Sastry | Sriram Prabhu, Gopika Poornima |
| 5. | "Ole Ole Ole" | Bhuvana Chandra | Radhika |
| 6. | "Kallalloki Kallu Petti" | Sirivennela Seetharama Sastry | K. S. Chithra |

== Reception ==
A critic from Rediff.com opined that "What is most noticeable about the film is that Richa and Tarun, despite their debutant status, are very comfortable in front of the camera, their performances bearing comparison with the seasoned showing of Boban and Shalini in the Malayalam original". Jeevi of Idlebrain.com gave the film a rating of 4.5 out of 5 and noted that "There is never a dull moment in this film". Andhra Today wrote "Vijaya Bhaskar, who shot to fame with the genre of movies like "Swayamvaram" to attain critical acclaim has proved his mettle once again by relying heavily on the story. Along with a good story, he has also optimized on the talents of the star cast and the crew of technicians to give an excellent movie. The first half is very enjoyable with a lot of comedy and good songs. The second half is all about the love conflict between the young friends and hence may dampen the spirits of the audience. If this is taken in the right spirit of the story, the movie will be a great hit".

== Box office ==
Nuvve Kavali had an initial budget of ₹0.75 crore, however, the makers spent over ₹1.2 crore by the completion of filming to improve the production values. The film collected a distributor's share of over ₹20 crore at the box office, making it one of the most profitable Telugu films of all time and highest grossing Telugu film at the time of its release. It was also one of the highest grossing South Indian films at the time of its release and the highest grossing South Indian film in a single language. The film ran for 100 days at 30 centres, 200 days at 20 centres, 250 days at 10 centres, and 365 days at 6 centres.

== Awards ==
National Film Awards

- Best Feature Film in Telugu - Ramoji Rao: For a refreshing film about a teenage friendship that blossoms into romance. The film stands out for its youthful treatment thus bringing out the exuberance of this film.

Filmfare Awards

- Best Film – Telugu - Ramoji Rao
- Best Director – Telugu - K. Vijaya Bhaskar
- Best Actress – Telugu - Richa Pallod
- Best Playback Singer - South - Sriram Prabhu
