= Veedhi =

- Directed by: V. Dorairaj
- Written by: R Pruthvi Raj (dialogues)
- Screenplay by: V. Dorairaj
- Story by: V. Dorairaj
- Produced by: Ramoji Rao
- Starring: Sharwanand; Gopika
- Cinematography: Bharani K. Dharan
- Edited by: Basva Paidireddy
- Music by: Anup Rubens
- Production company: Ushakiran Movies
- Release date: 10 August 2006
- Country: India
- Language: Telugu

Veedhi (transl. Street) is a 2006 Telugu-language film directed by V Dorairaj. The film stars Sharwanand and Gopika with Vinay Varma in a negative role.

== Cast ==
- Sharwanand as Surya
- Gopika as Seetha Mahalakshmi
- Vinay Varma as Sivanna
- Nataraj
- Santosh
- Aryan
- M.S. Narayana
- Rallapalli
- Brahmanandam
- Delhi Rajeswari
- Master Siva Varma
- Harsha Vardhan
- Mannava Balayya
- Pilla Prasad
- Kondavalasa
- Jayalalita
- Dil Ramesh
- Jeeva
- P. D. Raju
- Siva Krishna
- Vinod Kumar
- Rajyalakshmi
- Mallikarjuna Rao
- Krishnudu
- Noel Sean

== Production ==
The story is based on a true incident that happened in Bihar. The shooting of the film ended on 3 June 2006. Raju Voopati, who previously directed Dham rechristened himself as V Dorairaj for this film. The film is produced by Ushakiran Movies and has music by Anup Rubens. This film marks Rubens's second collaboration with Ushakiran Movies after Chitram (2000).

== Release and reception ==
The film was scheduled to release at the end of June, but was delayed.

The film was released to mixed reviews from critics.

Sify gave the film a rating of three out of five and wrote that "Veedhi is a dead end and most inept movie of the year award should go to its director Dorairaj". The Full Hyderabad wrote that "The film has lesser logic than a bowl of goldfish – what lend it some platform of watchability are the performances". On the contrary, the critic praised the comedy sequences and performances of the newcomers. Telugu Cinema wrote "Director Dorairaj’s handling of the film is amateurish. After his dumb debut (Dhum) he comes again with turkey".
