= Neetho (2002 film) =

- Directed by: John
- Written by: John; Vishwanath (dialogues)
- Produced by: Ramoji Rao
- Starring: Prakash Kovelamudi; Mahek Chahal
- Cinematography: Chota K. Naidu
- Music by: Vidyasagar
- Production company: Ushakiran Movies
- Release date: 27 June 2002
- Country: India
- Language: Telugu

Neetho (transl. With you) is a 2002 Telugu romance film directed by John, starring Prakash Kovelamudi and Mahek Chahal in their debut roles. The film marked the debut of K. Raghavendra Rao's son Prakash Kovelamudi (Suryaprakash). Despite the film's failure, John Mahendran remade the film in Tamil as Sachein, which clashed with Chandramukhi in 2005.

== Plot ==
Madhav is a new student of a college in Hyderabad. He spots a beautiful girl Shalini and falls in love with her. Madhav is calm but Shalini is short-tempered. She gets into a fight with an eve teaser whose father happens to be a notorious faction leader. When Madhav confronts the leader, it is revealed that Madhav is the son of Manohar, a successful industrialist.

A flashback episode begins and it is revealed that Manohar wants Madhav to select a bride for himself. Madhav feels that girls want to marry him only because he is the son of a billionaire. He asks his father to give him a year's time so that he will join a college in Hyderabad as a normal student and select a girl who loves him truly. When Shalini rejects Madhav's proposal, he asks her to act as his lover for thirty days and he says that she would automatically fall in love. Shalini accepts the offer and starts acting as his lover for thirty days. After thirty days, Shalini tells Madhav that she is not in love with him. Deep inside, she begins to like him, but she suppresses her feelings due to her preconceived notion of not falling in love. After much rethinking, she decides to express her love. Her plans are spoilt when she learns that Madhav is the son of a billionaire. She thinks that Madhav might misunderstand her and feel she changed her mind after realizing that he is the son of a wealthy tycoon. What eventually happens between the two forms the climax of the movie.

== Cast ==
- Suryaprakash as Madhav
- Mahek Chahal as Shalini
- Prakash Raj as Manohar
- Brahmanandam as Madhav's housekeeper
- Rajiv Kanakala
- Sunil as Sunil
- Tanikella Bharani as Shalini's father
- Delhi Rajeshwari as Shalini's mother
- Raghu Karumanchi as Madhav's friend
- Chitram Srinu as Madhav's friend
- Dharmavarapu Subramanyam
- Ahuti Prasad

== Soundtrack ==
The soundtrack is composed by Vidyasagar. Lyrics of all the songs were written by Chandrabose. The song "Navvali Neetho" is based on Vidyasagar's own Malayalam song "Thathamma Peru" from Dhosth while "Pannendintiki" is based on Tamil song "Kadhal Vandhadhum" from Poovellam Un Vaasam (2001).

| No | Title | Singer(s) | Writer(s) |
|---|---|---|---|
| 1 | "Navvali Neetho" | Hariharan | Chandrabose |
| 2 | "Arare Evaridi" | Harish Raghavendra | Chandrabose |
| 3 | "Pannendintiki" | K. S. Chithra, Vijay Yesudas | Chandrabose |
| 4 | "Jaajipulu" | Sujatha, Febi Mani | Chandrabose |
| 5 | "Panchabuthala" | KK, Sadhana Sargam | Chandrabose |
| 6 | "Dil Dil Dil" | Karthik, P. Jayachandran | Chandrabose |

== Release and reception ==
The film received negative reviews and was a box-office failure. Jeevi of Idlebrain gave the film a rating of 2 3/4 out of five and opined that "First half of the film is promising. But the second half takes a severe beating with dragged scenes and snail-paced narration". Gudipoodi Srihari of The Hindu gave the film a negative review.
