= Chitra (2001 film) =

2001 film by Dinesh Baboo

- Poster
- Directed by: Dinesh Baboo
- Written by: J. K. Bharavi
- Screenplay by: Dinesh Baboo
- Story by: Teja
- Based on: Chitram (2000)
- Produced by: Ramoji Rao
- Starring: Prasad; Rekha Vedavyas
- Cinematography: Dinesh Baboo, P. K. H. Das
- Edited by: P. R. Sounder Rajan
- Music by: Gurukiran
- Production company: Ushakiran Movies
- Release date: 17 August 2001
- Running time: 2 hours 38 minutes
- Country: India
- Language: Kannada

Chitra (transl. Picture) is a 2001 Indian Kannada-language romantic drama film directed by Dinesh Babu and produced by Ramoji Rao. A remake of the Telugu film Chitram (2000), directed by Teja, the film stars Prasad and newcomer Rekha Vedavyas with Ananth Nag in a supporting role. The film had musical score by Gurukiran, which was well received. The film, upon release, was well received and declared a silver jubilee at the box office.

== Cast ==
- Prasad as Ramu
- Rekha Vedavyas as Chitra (credited as Chitra)
- Anant Nag as Ramu's father
- Aniruddha Jatkar as Ramu's friend
- Sunil Raoh as Ramu's friend
- Sharan
- Gurukiran
- Master Anand as Prashanth
- Vinayak Joshi
- Ganesh Varsha
- Sanketh Kashi as Govinda, Kannada lecturer
- Naga Prasad
- Ramesh Bhat
- Ashalatha
- Vanitha Vasu
- Bank Janardhan
- Mandeep Roy
- Sri Gowri
- Master Arun
- Baby Raksha
- John D'Souza
- M. N. Suresh

== Production ==
This is Prabhu Deva's brother Prasad's first Kannada film. Model Rekha Vedavyas plays an NRI student in the film. She received the role after one of the producers, Jayashri Devi, saw her photographs.

== Soundtrack ==
Chitra

Soundtrack album by Gurukiran
- Released: 2001
- Genre: Feature film soundtrack
- Label: Anand Audio

Gurukiran chronology
| Premi No.1 (2001) | Chitra (2001) | Majnu (2001) |

The music of the film was composed by Gurukiran. The soundtrack was well received upon release and Gurukiran won the Filmfare Award for Best Music Director for the year 2001. The lyric "Jinke Mari" (transl. Little deer) from "Pori Tapori" earned Rekha Vedavyas the name Jinke Mari Rekha.

Track listing
| No. | Title | Lyrics | Singer(s) | Length |
|---|---|---|---|---|
| 1. | "Pori Tapori Bandlo" | K. Kalyan | Shankar Shanbog, Sonu Nigam, Murali Mohan, Gurukiran, Arun Sagar | 04:33 |
| 2. | "Jhum Jhum Romanchana" | K. Kalyan | Sonu Nigam | 04:14 |
| 3. | "LOVE Geethanjali" | K. Kalyan | S. P. Balasubrahmanyam | 05:37 |
| 4. | "Punjabnalli Tension" | K. Kalyan | S. P. Balasubrahmanyam, Murali Mohan | 05:16 |
| 5. | "Usire Jojo" | K. Kalyan | Sonu Nigam | 04:36 |
| 6. | "Zimbole Zimbole" | K. Kalyan | Sonu Nigam, Suresh Peters | 05:06 |

== Reception ==
A critic from Chitraloka.com wrote that "No fights, not much of melodrama (exception to first half) a bunch of friends looking after the comedy department and Gurukiran to make you crazy and of course handling the minute elements effectively is what draws you to this film". A critic from indiainfo rated the film three out of five and wrote that "Though Chitra has a serious social message, it is packed with good humour & acting by co-stars. Dinesh Babu's story telling with humour is there in this movie too. Hence it is a well-balanced movie".
