= Akasa Veedhilo =

2001 film by Singeetam Srinivasa Rao

- Movie Poster
- Directed by: Singeetam Srinivasa Rao
- Written by: Singeetam Srinivasa Rao; Paruchuri Brothers (dialogue)
- Produced by: Ramoji Rao
- Starring: Nagarjuna Akkineni; Rajendra Prasad; Raveena Tandon; Kasthuri
- Cinematography: S. Gopal Reddy
- Edited by: A. Sreekar Prasad
- Music by: M. M. Keeravani
- Production company: Usha Kiran Movies
- Distributed by: Mayuri Films
- Release date: 23 August 2001
- Running time: 139 minutes
- Country: India
- Language: Telugu

Akasa Veedhilo (transl. In the streets of the sky) is a 2001 Indian Telugu-language drama film written and directed by Singeetam Srinivasa Rao. Produced by Ramoji Rao, under Usha Kiran Movies banner. The film stars Nagarjuna Akkineni, Rajendra Prasad, Raveena Tandon, Kasthuri, with music composed by M. M. Keeravani.

== Cast ==
- Nagarjuna Akkineni as Chandu / Chandra Shekar
- Raveena Tandon as Indu
- Rajendra Prasad as Suri Babu
- Kasthuri as Padma
- Rahul Dev as Terrorist
- Kota Srinivasa Rao as G.K.
- Sudhakar as Mohan
- Mallikarjuna Rao as Bhajanlal
- Giri Babu as Jagadiswara Rao
- Chalapathi Rao as Airforce chief
- A.V.S as Advocate
- M. S. Narayana as Flight Passenger
- Lakshmi Ratan as Prasad Rao
- Kaushal Manda as Terrorist
- Raghunatha Reddy as Airforce officer
- Shankar Melkote
- Ironleg Sastry as himself
- Jenny as Kamala's father
- Siva Parvathi as G.K's wife
- Sri Lakshmi as Flight Passenger
- Rajitha as Kamala
- Madhurisen as Air Hostess
- Teja Sajja as Ram & Laksham (dual role)

== Production ==
It was reported by the media that Singeetam lost interest in the project midway and that R. R. Shinde completed the film.

== Soundtrack ==
Akasa Veedhilo

Film score by M. M. Keeravani
- Released: 2001
- Genre: Soundtrack
- Length: 27:26
- Label: Mayuri Music
- Producer: M. M. Keeravani

M. M. Keeravani chronology
| Bava Nachadu (2001) | Akasa Veedhilo (2001) | Student No.1 (2001) |

Music composed by M. M. Keeravani.

| No. | Title | Lyrics | Singer(s) | Length |
|---|---|---|---|---|
| 1. | "Vennello Aadapilla" | Chandrabose | Devi Sri Prasad, Ganga Sitharasu | 4:49 |
| 2. | "Yem Strokichavu Guru" | Bhuvanachandra | S. P. Balasubrahmanyam, Chitra | 4:48 |
| 3. | "Mallechinukula Vanalle" | Sirivennela Sitarama Sastry | Shashi Preetam, Ganga Sitharasu | 4:16 |
| 4. | "Hottara Bera Bera" | Sirivennela Sitarama Sastry | Suresh Peters | 5:00 |
| 5. | "Babre Babre" | Sirivennela Sitarama Sastry | Shashi Preetam, Ganga Sitharasu | 4:33 |
| Total length: | | | | 27:26 |

== Critical reception ==
Idlebrain.com wrote, "This film was started in the beginning of the year 1999 and is based on the Kandahar Flight hijack incident. A story was woven around it. The first half of the film is boring. The second half is very predictable. This film is recommended only for the Nag's fans". Telugucinema.com wrote, "It's a lavishly made film not only spending a lot on the outdoors but also on the graphics but poorly treated. Story and screenplay are too ordinary and there is no scope for imagination. Till interval the film doesn't really take off and then the things move too fast, yet in a predictable way".
