= Sixer (2007 film) =

- Directed by: Shashank
- Written by: M L Prasanna [dialogue]
- Screenplay by: Shashank
- Story by: Shashank
- Produced by: Ramoji Rao
- Starring: Prajwal Devaraj; Devaki
- Cinematography: Joshi Makaranda
- Edited by: Dhamodar
- Music by: Hamsalekha
- Production company: Ushakiran Movies
- Release date: 5 January 2007
- Country: India
- Language: Kannada

Sixer is a 2007 Indian Kannada language film which marks the debut of director Shashank and Prajwal Devaraj. It was released to average reviews and performed positively at the box office.

== Plot ==
The film is about a teenager who dreams of becoming a cricket player and who works for an underworld don, only to fall in love with the daughter of his boss's rival.

== Cast ==
- Prajwal Devaraj as Rahul
- Devaki as Swathi
- Avinash as Shyam
- Thulasi as Prabhavathi
- Nivedhitha
- Rangayana Raghu as Malpe Nayaka
- Mandeep Roy as professor
- Adi Lokesh as Khandre
- Chitra Shenoy as Swathi's mother
- Yash Hemani
- Syed Kirmani as himself
- Sharan as priest
- Sadhu Kokila
- Jayatheertha
- Shobaraj

== Production ==
The film was launched on 12 January 2006.

== Soundtrack ==
Soundtrack was composed by Hamsalekha.

- Thippagondalli - Anoop
- Nanna Preethiyalli - Harish Raghavendra
- Adyako Ittichige - Nandini Hamsalekha
- Oye Thangali - Harish Raghavendra
- Mel Preethi - K. S. Chithra, Anoop

== Reception ==
=== Critical response ===
R. G. Vijayasarathy of IANS rated the film 2 1/2 out of 5 and wrote that " It is Prajwal who is a live wire of the film 'Sixer' which does not boast of a great story or a fantastic narration". A critic from Rediff.com wrote that "Rangayana Raghu overacts and Aadi Lokesh should certainly change his stylised dialogue delivery. The camerawork is ordinary when compared to current Cinema. Sixer is a good debut for Prajwal and a film that won't bore you." A critic from The Hindu wrote that "Director Shashank's skill in juxtaposing the murky underworld with the innocent yet confused relationship between a teenaged boy and girl stands out. However, the screenplay is patchy and situations unrealistic".
