= Ninagagi =

2002 film by S. Mahendar

- CD cover
- Directed by: S. Mahendar
- Written by: Ikbal Kuttipuram
- Screenplay by: S. Mahender
- Based on: Niram (Malayalam)
- Produced by: Ramoji Rao
- Starring: Vijay Raghavendra; Radhika; Tara; Vishal Hegde
- Cinematography: Ramesh Babu
- Edited by: P. R. Soundar Raj
- Music by: Gurukiran
- Production company: Ushakiran Movies
- Release date: 3 May 2002
- Running time: 147 minutes
- Country: India
- Language: Kannada

Ninagagi (transl. For You) is a 2002 Indian Kannada language romantic musical film directed by S. Mahendar. The film stars Vijay Raghavendra in his first role as an adult and newcomer Radhika. The film is about a special friendship between a boy and girl. The film is a remake of the Malayalam film Niram (1999). The film was produced by Ramoji Rao and the music was composed by Gurukiran.

The film upon release met with very good positive response at the box office. It was one of the highest-grossing films of the year 2002.

== Plot ==
Madhu and Tarun are two best friends and neighbors born on the same day, in the same hospital and are very free spirited. They are very close to each other and often exchange their gifts and almost everything they have. Most of the times, people confuse them as lovers. They have never stayed away from each other since their childhood. They also have been classmates since childhood. One day, Madhu happens to go to Hyderabad with her friends while Tarun stays back in Bangalore for his sports practice. During their separation, Tarun misses Madhu badly. His cook Rukku tells him that it is love. Tarun acknowledges his feelings for Madhu and writes a love letter to Madhu to give it to her when she returns from Hyderabad. Next day, Tarun happens to see his friend slap a boy who proposed her. She tells Tarun that she only thought him as her good friend and gives an example of Madhu and Tarun's pure friendship.

In order to not lose Madhu's friendship, Tarun hides the love letter. After returning from Hyderabad, Madhu tells Tarun that their college friend Prakash proposed her and asks Tarun's suggestions to reply him. Later Madhu accepts the proposal. Prakash's grandmother arrives at Madhu's and asks her parents to arrange for Prakash and Madhu's wedding as soon as possible. She also tells them that after the wedding, Madhu would have to move abroad with Prakash and his parents. Madhu is unable to digest the fact that she has to leave her parents and especially Tarun after marriage and settle elsewhere, that too forever. This makes Madhu ask Tarun why he didn't propose her before Prakash did. If he had done it, maybe this situation would not have raised. To this, Tarun hugs Madhu. Finding something amiss, Madhu remembers the letter Tarun hid from her which she had caught a glimpse of. She checks it and finds out that Tarun, in fact loved her before Prakash.

Tarun and Madhu are in emotional turmoil now as Madhu's engagement had already gotten over. Nothing much could be done. Rukku tells Madhu and Tarun's family everything. Both the families are happy to know this. They tell Madhu and Tarun to marry instead. The movie ends with a happy note where Madhu and Tarun accept the elders' decision.

== Cast ==
- Vijay Raghavendra as Tarun
- Radhika Kumaraswamy as Madhu
- Ramakrishna as PWD contractor Raghavendra, Madhu's Father
- Tara as Rukkamma, cook in Tarun's House
- Avinash as Dr. Subramanya, Tarun's father
- Chitra Shenoy as Dr. Usha, Tarun's Mother
- Vishal Hegde as Prakash
- Shilpa as Varsha
- Vidya Murthy as Madhu's Mother
- Nagashekhar as Sunil
- Sanketh Kashi as SK, a mental & silly lecturer
- Sihi Kahi Chandru as College Principal
- Prashanth as Praveen
- Bharath Bhagavathar
- Ashalatha
- Hemashree as Kamala
- Dileep Kar
- Shankar Bhat
- Bhavana as special appearance in the song "Tin Tin"

== Soundtrack ==
All the songs were composed and scored by Gurukiran. Three songs were recomposed with the same tunes as in the original film.

Sl No	Song title	Singer(s)	Lyrics
1	"Yellelli Naa Nodali"	Rajesh Krishnan	K. Kalyan
2	"Yemmo Yemmo"	Annupamaa, Gurukiran	K. Kalyan
3	"Hani Hani Seri"	Madhu Balakrishnan, K. S. Chithra	V. Manohar
4	"Tin Tin Tin"	Annupamaa	V. Manohar
5	"Shukriya"	Hemanth Kumar, Shamitha Malnad	K. Kalyan
6	"Kanninalli Kannanittu"	K. S. Chithra	K. Kalyan

== Reception ==
A critic from Chitraloka wrote that "In all ‘Ninagagi’ gives a comfortable viewing. It is a good entertainment for your money".
