= Modada Mareyalli =

- VCD cover
- Directed by: M. S. Rajashekar
- Screenplay by: Chi. Udayashankar
- Based on: Kireedam (1989) by Sibi Malayil
- Produced by: Parvathamma Rajkumar
- Starring: Shiva Rajkumar; Yamuna
- Cinematography: V. K. Kannan
- Edited by: S. Manohar
- Music by: Rajan–Nagendra
- Production company: Sri Vaishnavi Combines
- Release date: 24 May 1991
- Running time: 143 minutes
- Country: India
- Language: Kannada

Modada Mareyalli (transl. In the shelter of clouds) is a 1991 Indian Kannada-language crime drama film starring Shiva Rajkumar and Yamuna, and directed by M. S. Rajashekar. It is a remake of the 1989 Malayalam film Kireedam.

== Plot ==
The story revolves around Ravi, the son of Panduranga Rao, a Police constable, who wishes to make his son an officer. Ravi, a recent college graduate, has many opportunities to enter different fields but he goes with his father's dream of becoming an Inspector. Panduranga gets transferred into a town whose residents are troubled by the rowdy Kari Kaala (Mohan Raj). The police force in the town turns a blind eye to the acts of Kari Kaala. One day Panduranga gets information that Kari Kaala is creating trouble in the marketplace. Being an honest policeman, he goes on site to investigate where he takes him on. Hearing of trouble, Ravi too rushes to the market. Panduranga is no match for the goon and Ravi tries to intervene before his father is injured. A fight ensues between Kari Kaala and Ravi and both are arrested by the police. Since he managed to defeat the reigning rowdy, Ravi is typecast as a rowdy by the people of the town.

After recovering, Kari Kaala targets Ravi and his family. With the police failing to protect him, Ravi is forced to fight for his life and ends up killing Kari Kaala. Ravi is sentenced to prison for murdering Kari Kaala and hence is disqualified from being a Police Inspector. Head Constable Panduranga reads the Police Verification Report which states Ravi is a "notorious criminal".

== Cast ==
- Shiva Rajkumar as Ravi
- K. S. Ashwath as M. R. Panduranga Rao
- Yamuna as Devi (credited as Soumya)
- Kundara Johny as Kari Kaala
- Srinath
- Shivakumar as Keshava, Ravi's friend
- Honnavalli Krishna as Kitty
- Sadashiva Brahmavar as shopkeeper
- Girija Lokesh as Kaveri, Ravi's mother
- Papamma as Ravi's neighbour
- Sihi Kahi Chandru as Gunda, Ravi's uncle
- Sihi Kahi Geetha as Geetha, Gunda's wife
- Doddanna as Doddanna
- Shani Mahadevappa as Purushottam, a constable

== Soundtrack ==
The duo of Rajan–Nagendra scored for the film's background and its film soundtrack, lyrics for which was penned by Chi. Udayashankar. The soundtrack album consists of four tracks.

All lyrics are written by Chi. Udayashankar.

Track listing
No.	Title	Singer(s)	Length
1.	"Manadalli Aaseye Bere"	Dr. Rajkumar	4:06
2.	"Jeeva Neenu Deha Naanu"	S. P. Balasubrahmanyam, Manjula Gururaj	4:11
3.	"Baalu Uyyaaleyanthe"	S. P. Balasubrahmanyam, Manjula Gururaj	4:40
4.	"Entha Chinnadantha Huduga"	Shiva Rajkumar	4:26
Total length:			17:23
