= Padutha Theeyaga (film) =

1998 Indian Telugu film

- Directed by: Kranthi Kumar
- Written by: Ganesh Patro (dialogues)
- Screenplay by: Kranthi Kumar
- Story by: Kranthi Kumar
- Produced by: Ramoji Rao
- Starring: Vineeth; Heera Rajagopal
- Cinematography: Hari Anumolu
- Music by: Mahesh Mahadevan
- Production company: Usha Kiran Movies
- Release date: 28 May 1998
- Country: India
- Language: Telugu

Padutha Theeyaga (transl. I will sing sweetly) is a 1998 Indian Telugu-language musical romantic drama film directed by Kranthi Kumar starring Vineeth and Heera Rajagopal.

== Plot ==
Rushi, a singer, and his music trope aspire to make it big musically. They meet Gautham Kumar, the owner of Sona Music Company, who invites them to Hyderabad for a music competition. Rushi and his trope don't have much female luck until Uma disguised as a male Malayali cook comes into their house. Uma then goes missing. Gautham Kumar and his friend Radha search for her. Rushi learns that Uma is Gautham Kumar's daughter. Uma tells Rushi that the reason that she ran away from her home was that her father cheated on her mother Durga and lived with Radha. When Rushi tells Gautham Kumar about his love for Uma, Gautham Kumar tells him to decide between his career or Uma and Rushi chooses his career. Uma helps Rushi win the competition and Gautham Kumar agrees to let Rushi be with Uma.

== Cast ==
- Vineeth as Rushi
- Heera Rajagopal as Uma
- Ravi Teja
- S. P. Balasubrahmanyam as Gautham Kumar
- Suhasini as Radha
- Urvashi as Durga
- Kota Srinivasa Rao
- AVS
- Tanikella Bharani
- Rallapalli
- Uttej
- Sivaji
- Kallu Chidambaram
- Dharmavarapu Subramanyam
- M. S. Narayana
- Costumes Krishna
- Sekhar
- Velu
- Master Uday

== Production ==
According to Kranthi Kumar, the theme of the film is that people with talent who do not get opportunities are depressed, but if they work hard in life, they will succeed. V. V. Vinayak worked as an assistant director for this film.

== Soundtrack ==
The music was composed by Mahesh Mahadevan and written by Sirivennela Seetharama Sastry.

- "Mangala Vaadhyam"
- "Navatharaaniki Namasthe"
- "Paaduthaa Theeyagaa"
- "Paata Naaku Naestham"
- " Prema Puttindho"
- "Sa Ri Ga Ma Pa"
- "Thellavaare Vaela"

== Reception ==
A critic from Zamin Ryot wrote that apart from the songs, the way that the songs were canned and the talent they showcase, there is no other interesting or noteworthy thing in this film and concluded that the film is one time watchable. On the contrary, a critic from Andhra Today rated the film three out of five stars and wrote that "All in all it is a family entertainer, with scintillating songs, excellent photography, well-handled story line and surprising turn of events, which comes like a whiff of fresh air". Screen wrote "Heera silences her critics with an impressive performance and erases the glam doll image with one stroke. Vineesh performs his role with aplomb and his friends Ravi Teja, Shekhar and Shivaji provide ample support".

== Home media ==
The film was telecast on ETV Cinema on 13 May 2022.
