= Kanchana Ganga (1984 film) =

- Directed by: V. Madhusudhana Rao
- Written by: Yaddanapudi Sulochana Rani (Story); D. V. Narasa Raju (Dialogues)
- Produced by: Ramoji Rao
- Starring: Chandra Mohan; Sarath Babu; Saritha; Swapna; Prathap Pothen
- Cinematography: S. Gopal Reddy
- Edited by: B. Venkata Ratnam
- Music by: K. Chakravarthy
- Production company: Ushakiran Movies
- Release date: 1984
- Country: India
- Language: Telugu

Kanchana Ganga is a 1984 Telugu-language romantic drama film directed by V. Madhusudhana Rao and produced by Ramoji Rao under Ushakiran Movies. The film stars Chandra Mohan, Sarath Babu, Saritha, Swapna and Pratap Pothen. The film is based on a novel by Yaddanapudi Sulochana Rani.

== Plot ==
Kanchana and Ganga are friends. Kanchana wants to become a lawyer. Ganga always dreams of wealth. Kanchana is in love with Prabhakar. Kanchana discovers that Jayasimha is a murderer and sentenced to jail for two years. She starts hating Jayasimha. Ganga goes to Kanchana's home leaving her parents as they are trying to marry her off to a person who was already married. Kanchana's paternal uncle, Prabhakar's father and aunt Annapurnamma accept Prabhakar and Kanchana's marriage. Annapurnamma calls Kanchana to introduce him to her relatives. Kanchana and Ganga visit her home. There, Annapurnamma shows off her jewellery to Kanchana and Ganga and also tells them about other property details.

Knowing Prabhakar's property details, Ganga wants to marry him. She molests him and tells him that she loves him. She asks him to kiss her once and tells him she will go away. Prabhakar does so and Jayasimha sees them. He tells the same to Kanchana and her paternal uncle who do not believe him. Prabhakar visits Kanchana's home where they start moving closely. Kanchana returns home and sees them. Prabhakar silently leaves for his home. Ganga tells Kanchana that Prabhakar actually loved her and goes away.

Ganga calls Prabhakar and tells that Kanchana asked her to leave and she is going to the railway station. Prabhakar stops her and they go to a hotel. Where in they have sex, marry the next day and go to Prabhakar's home. Prabhakar's father and aunt scold them as they understood that Ganga married Prabhakar only to become rich. Prabhakar's father tells her that his cousin Annapurnamma is the owner of all the properties and asks them to leave.

Hearing the news of Prabhakar and Ganga's marriage, Kanchana's paternal uncle dies and Kanchana moves to a hostel. Prabhakar meets Mohan who was senior to him. Meanwhile Mohan sets his eyes on Ganga and gives Prabhakar a job and a house. Kanchana goes to Mohan's office for interview. Prabhakar tells her that he will recommend her for the job, but she leaves. Mohan sends Prabhakar to his branches in northern India to look into the accounts of his business and often visits Ganga in his absence and tries to molest her. Though reluctant at first, Ganga later makes love with Mohan.

Jayasimha becomes an auto-rickshaw driver and tries to help Kanchana, but she rejects his help. When she is teased by rowdies, Jayasimha fights them and saves her. Jayasimha and the rowdies get arrested by police. Kanchana bails him out and they go to his home. She does first aid to him and stays there for the night. Meanwhile her hostel warden denies her entry as she stayed overnight at an unknown man's house. Helpless, Kanchana goes to Jayasimha's house. He sells his auto-rickshaw and buys a taxi. Kanchana studies law with Jayasimha's help. She asks him to marry her, they marry and she becomes a lawyer. Jayasimha tells Kanchana that he is a post graduate and gold medalist and was falsely accused of murder.

Mohan brings a man to Ganga and asks her to have sex with him, which she rejects. Mohan tries to rape her and she kills him. Kanchana saves Ganga and all are united.

== Cast ==
- Chandra Mohan as Prabhakar
- Sarath Babu as Jayasimha
- Saritha as Kanchana
- Swapna as Ganga
- Pratap Pothen as Mohan
- J. V. Ramana Murthy as Kanchana's paternal uncle
- Annapoorna as Annapurnamma
- Suthi Velu as K. Daivadheenam
- Krishnaveni as Jagadeeshwari "Jaggu"
- Suthi Veerabhadra Rao as Jagadeeshwari's father
- Chakravarthy as S. Velu (cameo)
- Raavi Kondala Rao as Police Inspector (cameo)

== Soundtrack ==
- "Nee Tiyyani Pedavulu Andakapote Nidara Raadamma" (Lyrics: C. Narayana Reddy; Singer: S. P. Balasubrahmanyam; Featuring Chandra Mohan and Swapna)
- "Vanita Lata Kavita" (title background song by S.P.Balasubramanyam)
- "Oho Srimati Kanchana"(Singers:S. P. Sailaja ; Featuring Saritha)
- "O Priyatama Naa Gaganama" (Singers: S. P. Balasubramanyam and S. Janaki; Featuring Chandra Mohan and Saritha)
- "Brindavani Undi Yamuna Nadi Undi" (Lyrics: Veturi; Singer: S. P. Balasubramanyam; Featuring Sarath Babu)

== Awards ==
Nandi Awards - 1984

- Second Best Feature Film - Silver - Ramoji Rao
- Best Lyricist - Veturi "Brindavani Undi"
- Second Best Story Writer - Yaddanapudi Sulochana Rani
