= Naache Mayuri =

- Promotional Poster
- Directed by: T. Rama Rao
- Screenplay by: Singeetam Srinivasa Rao; Ganesh Patro; Rahi Masoom Raza (dialogue)
- Story by: Usha Kiran Movies Unit
- Based on: Mayuri by Singeetam Srinivasa Rao, Ganesh Patro
- Produced by: Ramoji Rao
- Starring: Sudha Chandran; Shekhar Suman; Aruna Irani; Dina Pathak; Sushma Seth
- Cinematography: V. Durga Prasad
- Music by: Laxmikant–Pyarelal; Anand Bakshi (lyrics); S. P. Balasubrahmanyam (background score)
- Production company: Ushakiran Movies
- Release date: 5 December 1986 (India)
- Country: India
- Language: Hindi

Naache Mayuri is a 1986 Indian Hindi dance biographical film directed by T. Rama Rao. It is a remake of the Telugu film, Mayuri (1984), about classical dancer-actress Sudha Chandran who stars as herself in both films.

The film was shot at Mehboob Studio, Chandivali Studio and Film City in Mumbai. Art direction was by Sudhendu Roy and dances were choreographed by Gopi Krishna.

== Plot ==
Mayuri is the real-life story of Bharatanatyam dancer Sudha Chandran, who lost her right leg in an accident on her way from Trichy to Chennai in June 1981. The story depicts how she received an artificial Jaipur foot and eventually learned to dance again, triumphing over her fate, and ultimately achieving success in life.

== Cast ==
- Sudha Chandran as Mayuri
- Shekhar Suman
- Aruna Irani as Durga
- Rupini as Shanthi
- Dina Pathak
- Satyen Kappu
- Sushma Seth
- Vinod Nagpal
- Mayuri Sudha
- Yunus Parvez
- Tabassum
- Viju Khote

== Music ==
The film has music by Laxmikant–Pyarelal, with lyrics by Anand Bakshi.

- "Chal Hat Chal Kal Phir Milne Ka Mang Na Mujhse Vaada" - Lata Mangeshkar
- "Jhoom Jhoom Nach Mayuri" - Lata Mangeshkar
- "Na Tum Ne Kiya Na Maine Kiya" - Suresh Wadkar, Lata Mangeshkar
- "Pag Paadam Sangeet Geet Sargam" - S. Janaki
- "Paijaniya Bol" - Lata Mangeshkar
- "Sadhana Aradhana Meri" - Lata Mangeshkar
