= Mechanic Mavayya =

Indian Telugu-language film

- Directed by: Rajendra Singh Babu
- Screenplay by: Rajendra Singh Babu
- Story by: Ajay Shanthi
- Produced by: Ramoji Rao
- Starring: Rajasekhar; Rambha
- Cinematography: Kamalakar Rao
- Edited by: Suresh Urs
- Music by: M. M. Keeravani
- Production company: Usha Kiran Movies
- Release date: 14 October 1999
- Country: India
- Language: Telugu

Mechanic Mavayya (transl. Mechanic Uncle) is a 1999 Indian Telugu-language film directed by Rajendra Singh Babu and starring Rajasekhar and Rambha.

== Cast ==
- Rajasekhar as Raju
- Rambha as Rani
- Paresh Rawal as Sidhardha
- S. P. Balasubrahmanyam as Srivatsav
- Srihari as Prithvi
- Kota Srinivasa Rao as Rani's father
- Urvashi
- Brahmanandam
- Manorama
- Nutan Prasad as Home Minister
- AVS
- Gundu Hanumantha Rao
- Shankar Melkote as Doctor

== Production ==
The film was shot at the Ramoji Film City. To get the Lilliput effect, Rajendra Babu created a 35-foot tall watermelon and constructed a bridge on top of it.

== Soundtrack ==
The music is composed by M. M. Keeravani.

Side A
No.	Title	Lyrics	Singer(s)	Length
1.	"Joru Joru Kurrakaru"	Veturi	S. P. Balasubrahmanyam, K. S. Chithra
2.	"Naake Dabbunte"	Veturi	S. P. Balasubrahmanyam
3.	"Pitta Bagundi"	Bhuvana Chandra	S. P. Balasubrahmanyam

Side B
No.	Title	Lyrics	Singer(s)	Length
1.	"Abbaboo Premsite Em Sukhamo"	Bhuvana Chandra	S. P. Balasubrahmanyam, K. S. Chithra, Usha Uthup
2.	"Tambura Tambura"	G. Krishna	M. M. Keeravani

== Reception ==
A critic from Sify wrote, "Remember Chitty Chitty Bang Bang? Mechanic Maavayya too is fashioned on those lines mixed with action, sentiment and entertainment". Reviewing the Kannada dubbed version, Srikanth Srinivasa of the Deccan Herald wrote, "Though Bharat 2000 makes an attempt to draw the attention of the audiences to the technical wizardry, the story and screenplay of the film have failed to bolster the film. This film coming from a veteran like S (V) Rajendra Singh Babu comes a cropper in terms of characterisation and screenplay".

The film was a box office failure.
