= Thoda Tum Badlo Thoda Hum =

- Film poster
- Directed by: Esmayeel Shroff
- Written by: Esmayeel Shroff
- Produced by: Ramoji Rao
- Starring: Arya Babbar; Shriya Saran
- Cinematography: Mazhar Kamran
- Edited by: A. Sreekar Prasad
- Music by: Amar Mohile
- Production company: Ushakiran Movies
- Release date: 2 July 2004
- Running time: 166 minutes
- Country: India
- Language: Hindi

Thoda Tum Badlo Thoda Hum is a 2004 Indian Hindi-language romance film written and directed by Esamyeel Shroff, starring Arya Babbar and Shriya Saran in the lead roles. The film is a remake of Telugu film Anandam (2001).

== Plot ==
Raju and Rani are neighbors and studying at the same college. But they never settle their differences and always fight. Rani keeps on making complaints against Raju, and hence his father scolds his son as good for nothing. However, both families have a good relationship. Rani's father is a police commissioner and a good friend of Raju's father. The hatred between Raju and Rani takes an ugly turn when Rani slaps Raju during a college competition, thus humiliating him.

Rani's father is then transferred to Kodaikanal, and as a friendly gesture, Raju, along with his parents, goes to the railway station to bid adieu. Rani is surprised by this change in his behaviour and she too undergoes a change inside her heart toward Raju. The two, after separating from each other, realise how they actually are in love.

== Cast ==
- Arya Babbar as Raju
- Shriya Saran as Rani
- Kiran Karmarkar as Dharam, Raju's father
- Ashok Saraf as Gangaram, Rani's father
- Nishigandha Wad as Usha
- Shoma Anand as Asha
- B. Venkat as Trishna
- Varsha Kapkar as Shraddha
- Shankar Melkote as Abhishek
- Shweta Menon

== Soundtrack ==
All lyrics are written by Nida Fazli; all music is composed by Amar Mohile.

Track listing
No.	Title	Singer(s)	Length
1.	"Thoda Tum Badlo Thoda Hum"	Alka Yagnik, Udit Narayan
2.	"Sabhi Aa Chuke Hai"	Sonu Nigam
3.	"Uff Yuh Ma"	Asha Bhosle, KK
4.	"Tauba Tauba"	Shreya Ghoshal, Udit Narayan
5.	"Aanchal Hai Pawan"	Shreya Ghoshal, Udit Narayan
6.	"Kalam Haath Mein Hai"	Sadhana Sargam, Udit Narayan
7.	"No Tension"	KK
8.	"Sun Re Peepal"	Sonu Nigam, Shreya Ghoshal, Sadhana Sargam, Vaishali Samant
9.	"Thoda Tum Badlo" (version 2)	Alka Yagnik, Udit Narayan

== Reception ==
Taran Adarsh of IndiaFM gave the film one stars out of five, writing, ″On the whole, THODA TUM BADLO THODA HUM is an ordinary fare. However, lack of promotion and face-value will make the film go unnoticed.″
