= Ashwini Nachappa =

Indian sprinter, actress

Personal information
- Born: 21 October 1967 (age 58) Karnataka, India
- Occupations: track and field athlete and actress
- Children: 2
Medal record
Women's athletics
Representing India
Asian Championships
Gold medal – first place	1985 Jakarta	4×400 m
Gold medal – first place	1987 Singapore	4×400 m
Gold medal – first place	1991 Kuala Lumpur	4×400 m
Silver medal – second place	1989 New Delhi	200 m
Silver medal – second place	1989 New Delhi	4×100 m
Bronze medal – third place	1985 Jakarta	4×100 m

Ashwini Nachappa (born 21 October 1967) is an Indian former track and field athlete and actress from Madikeri.

Nachappa gained fame around the start of the 1980s, when she outran P.T. Usha on two occasions. She has been referred to as India's FloJo. In 1988 she received the Arjuna award.

== Career ==
Ashwini Nachappa began her career in track and field as a hurdler before making the switch to sprints. She performed well at the 1981 Inter-State Championship in Bangalore in the under-16 category and won the 'most promising athlete of the meet' award. She trained under many coaches during the time till the late 1980s, when Sunil Abraham began to coach her.

Nachappa represented India in three South Asian Federation Games in 1984 (in Nepal; two silver medals), 1986 (in Bangladesh; two silver medals) and 1988 (in Pakistan, three gold medals). She participated in two Asian Games, one held in 1986 at South Korea (6th in long jump) and the other in 1990 at Beijing, China (silver medal in 4 × 100 m relay). She also represented India in two World Championships, one in 1987 in Rome and the other in 1991 in Tokyo (she was a member of the 4 × 400 m relay on both occasions). She won the 200 m gold at the 1990 National Open Meet in New Delhi ahead of Usha, clocking 24.07 seconds.

== Cinema and other works ==
She has acted in a few Telugu feature films, including her own biographical film titled Ashwini, for which she received the state Nandi Award for Best Debut Actress.

A noted social worker and educationist, she has also built a school.

She is currently the president of the Bangalore Urban District Athletics Association.

She is also a member of Bangalore Political Action Committee (B.PAC).

== Filmography ==
- Ashwini (1991)
- Inspector Ashwini (1993)
- Aarambham (1993)
- Aadarsham (1993)
- Andaru Andare (1994)
- Miss 420 (1995)
