= Sneha (TV series) =

Telugu television serial

- Genre: Investigative drama
- Written by: Suman
- Directed by: Vamsy
- Starring: Kaveri
- Opening theme: "Sneha... Sneha... Sneha..."
- Country of origin: India
- Original language: Telugu
- No. of episodes: approx. 200

Production
- Producer: Ramoji Rao
- Running time: 18–24 minutes
- Production company: Usha Kiran Movies

Original release
- Network: ETV
- Release: 29 August 1995

Sneha is an Indian Telugu-language television series that premiered on ETV on 29 August 1995. Directed by Vamsy and written by Suman, the series was produced by Ramoji Rao under the Usha Kiran Movies banner. Starring Kaveri in the title role, the show is an investigative drama featuring a strong and intelligent female protagonist.

One of the first programs to air on ETV after its launch, Sneha originally broadcast on Tuesdays at 8:00 PM before moving to different time slots. The series consisted of approximately 200 episodes, with the initial 120 focusing on standalone investigative stories. The final 80 episodes shifted to mystery-based themes under the Atma Kathalu story arc, which aired concurrently with the popular series Marmadesam on Gemini TV.

== Premise ==
The story follows Sneha, an independent and resourceful woman who navigates the complexities of balancing professional responsibilities with family challenges. Her struggles and problem-solving abilities highlight her determination and resilience, making her a symbol of empowerment in her neighbourhood.

== Cast ==
- Kaveri as Sneha
- Gundu Hanmantha Rao
- Sakshi Ranga Rao
- Rallapalli
- Kallu Chidambaram
- Raghu Babu
- Edida Sriram
- Raavi Kondala Rao
- Subbaraya Sarma
- Suthi Velu
- Chinna
- Uttej
- Ramjagan
- Devadas Kanakala

== Production ==
Sneha was produced by Ramoji Rao under the Usha Kiran Movies banner, with the script penned by his son, Suman. Renowned filmmaker Vamsy initially directed the series, but after his departure, other directors took over the project. The series was among the first to air on ETV following the channel's launch in August 1995.

== Themes ==
The serial highlighted societal issues such as the importance of financial prudence, humanity, and gender equality. Its focus on a strong, intelligent female protagonist was considered pioneering in Telugu television and contributed to discussions about women's empowerment in popular media.

== Music ==
The title song, "Sneha... Sneha... Sneha... Chikku Mudulenno Chakkaga Vippe Okanoka Vanitha," written by Suman, gained popularity among viewers for its composition.

== Release ==
Sneha premiered on 29 August 1995 and aired approximately 200 episodes. Initially broadcast on Tuesdays at 8:00 PM, its time slot was later shifted to Tuesdays at 8:30 PM, and eventually to Mondays at 8:30 PM.

The first 120 episodes explored diverse topics such as palm-leaf manuscripts, gotras of prominent individuals, felicitation ceremonies, ghostwriters, beauty parlours, and fraudulent film producers. The final 80 episodes centered on the Atma Kathalu story arc, which competed with the popular series Marmadesam, airing concurrently on Gemini TV.

== Reception ==
Sneha received praise for its engaging narrative and innovative storytelling. Kaveri's performance as the lead character was particularly well-received. The serial is remembered for its emphasis on equality and women's empowerment, securing its place as a significant show in early Telugu television history.

The stories featured in the series were later compiled and published in book format, reflecting the show's popularity.
