= People's Encounter =

- Directed by: A. Mohan Gandhi
- Starring: Vinod Kumar; Bhanupriya
- Cinematography: D. Prasad Babu
- Music by: M. M. Keeravani
- Production company: Ushakiran Movies
- Release date: 1 March 1991
- Country: India
- Language: Telugu

People's Encounter is a 1991 Indian Telugu-language film directed by Mohan Gandhi and starring Vinod Kumar and Bhanupriya. The film is based on the situations in Andhra Pradesh in the early 1990s. It was the debut film of Srikanth.

== Plot ==
At that time, the Peoples War Group (PWG), was an armed guerrilla army against the Government, who support the people who are needy and backwards. The struggle between Peoples War Group and the Government enabled forces like Law, Justice and Police to prevail. The movie was based on some true incidents that happened in the Andhra Pradesh..

== Cast ==
- Vinod Kumar as Jaggu
- Bhanupriya as Dr. Jyothi
- Srikanth as Vishwa
- Charan Raj as S.P. Tagore
- Gundu Hanumantha Rao as Hanumantha Rao
- Rallapalli as Ganga Raju
- Chalapathi Rao as Fakirayya Dora
- Prasad Babu as Inspector Ranga Rao
- Jayalalita as Savitri
- Vallabhaneni Janardhan as Home Minister
- Mallikarjuna Rao as Sukkadu
- Nirmalamma as Senior tribal lady
- Paruchuri Venkateswara Rao as Kantha Rao
- Y. Vijaya as Forest Minister

== Soundtrack ==
The songs were composed my M. M. Keeravani.

S. No.	Song title	Singers	Track Length (mm:ss)
1	"Ee Nela Manadira"	S. P. Balasubrahmanyam, S. P. Sailaja	04:41
2	"Laal Salaam"	S. P. Balasubrahmanyam	05:14
3	"Mukkalaina Rekkalatho"	S. P. Balasubrahmanyam	04:37
4	"Pindu Kunte Teepanta"	S. P. Balasubrahmanyam, S. P. Sailaja	04:39
5	"Potta Kooti Kosam Policeanna"	S. P. Balasubrahmanyam	02:13
6	"Ree Ree Naxal Bari"	S. P. Balasubrahmanyam, M. M. Keeravani	01:53
7	"Siva Siva Moorthivi Gananatha"	Jikki	04:30
8	"Naradahanam Puradahanam"	S. P. Balasubrahmanyam	04:12
