= Yamuna (actress) =

Indian actress

- Born: Prema; Bangalore, Karnataka, India
- Occupation: Actress
- Children: 2

Yamuna is an Indian actress who has appeared primarily in Telugu films in addition to a few Malayalam, Kannada and Tamil films. She appeared in films like Mamagaru, Mouna Poratam, and Yerra Mandaram. She also acted in TV shows.

== Personal life ==
Yamuna was born as Prema in Bangalore, Karnataka into a Telugu family. Their native is Chittoor, Andhra Pradesh but her family later moved to Bangalore. Director Balachander changed her name to Yamuna after film debut.

== Career ==
Yamuna made her debut in film in a lead role through Kannada film Modada Mareyalli (1991) alongside Shiva Rajkumar. She acted in over 50 Kannada and Telugu movies as the female lead. She shot into fame in 1989 with award-winning Telugu film Mouna Poratam which is based on the real-life story of Sabita Badhei, which gained massive media coverage. Yamuna played the role of Durga who is betrayed by a government officer and fights for her conjugal rights, seeking marital recognition to give proper identity to her illegitimate child.

Later she played one of the leads opposite Vinod Kumar in the successful film Mamagaru. In the 1990 film Puttinti Pattu Cheera, she played the role of an unlucky daughter who is harassed by her in-laws. She also played the lead role in Erramandaram. She also acted in Kannada films with Siva Rajkumar and Ravichandran.

== Allegations ==
Yamuna was arrested in connection with an alleged prostitution racket at the ITC Royal Gardenia, a five-star hotel in Bangalore, in January 2011. She was subsequently released on bail. In a later interview, Yamuna said that she had been exonerated by the court and that the allegations against her were false.

== Filmography ==
Year	Film	Role	Language	Notes
1987	Manathil Uruthi Vendum		Tamil	Debut in Tamil
1989	Mouna Poratam	Durga	Telugu	
1989	Mouna Poratam		Tamil	Tamil version
1989	Dilli Babu		Tamil	
1990	Puttinti Pattu Cheera		Telugu	
1990	Inspector Rudra		Telugu	
1990	Ghatana		Telugu	
1990	Aadadhi		Telugu	
1990	Udhyamam	Shanta	Telugu	
1990	Agni Pravesam		Telugu	
1991	Yerra Mandaram	Arundhati	Telugu	
1991	Gowramma		Telugu	
1991	Mamagaru	Lakshmi	Telugu	
1991	Nagamma		Telugu	
1991	Amma Kadupu Challanga		Telugu	
1991	Intlo Pilli Veedhilo Puli		Telugu	
1991	Modada Mareyalli		Kannada	
1991	Aadi Viratham		Tamil	
1991	Porantha Veetu Pattu Pudavai		Tamil	
1992	College Bullodu	Shobha	Telugu	
1992	Surigaadu		Telugu	
1992	Bangaru Mama		Telugu	
1992	Adrushtam		Telugu	
1992	Prema Vijetha		Telugu	
1992	Karuninchina Kanakadurga		Telugu	
1992	Naga Bala		Telugu	
1992	Mavanige Thakka Aliya		Kannada	
1992	Hendathire Husharu		Kannada	
1992	Sivasankari		Tamil	
1993	Aadarsam	Vani	Telugu	
1993	Rajadhani		Telugu	
1993	Mogudugaru		Telugu	
1994	Brahmachari Mogudu	Jayalakshmi	Telugu	
1994	Andaru Andare		Telugu	
1994	Mantrala Marrichettu		Telugu	
1994	Nannagaru		Telugu	
1994	Bangaru Kutumbam	Krishnaveni	Telugu	
1994	Govinda Govinda	Goddess Mahalakshmi	Telugu	
1994	Keralida Sarpa		Kannada	
1994	Chinna		Kannada	
1995	Dear Brother		Telugu	
1995	Premaku Padi Sutralu		Telugu	
1996	College Student		Telugu	
1997	Prema Geethe		Kannada	
1998	Hello Yama		Kannada	
2000	Bachi	Parvathi	Telugu	
2001	Eduruleni Manishi	Bhavani	Telugu	
2001	Sri Manjunatha	Priya Ganga	Telugu	
2001	Sri Manjunatha	River Ganga	Kannada	
2002	O Chinnadana		Telugu	
2006	Yuga		Tamil	
2008	Haage Summane		Kannada	
2009	Manasu Pilichindi		Telugu	
2010	Bhageerathudu		Telugu	
2010	Naariya Seere Kadda		Kannada	
2010	Shambho Shankara		Kannada	
2011	Keratam		Telugu	
2011	Kanteerava		Kannada	
2011	Yuvan		Tamil	Dubbed version
2014	Dil Rangeela		Kannada	
2017	Rajahamsa		Kannada	
2018	Taxiwaala	Sisira's mother	Telugu	

== Television ==
- Thiruvilaiyadal (Sun TV)
- Amman (Sun TV)
- Vidhi (ETV) as Saroja / Rosy
- Anveshitha (ETV) as Snigdha Devi
- Raktha Sambandham (Gemini TV)
- Allare Allari (ETV Plus)
- Seethama Vakitilo Sirimalle Chettu (Vidhi-2) as Rosy
- Lakshmi (Udaya TV)
- Lakshmi Jhansiya Magalu (Udaya TV)
- Devi (Zee Kannada)
- Damini (Gemini TV)
- Amrutam
- Ala Vaishu Nilayam Lo (etv plus)
- Mouna Poratam (ETV)
- Thulasi (Etv plus)
