= Anandam =

2001 film by Srinu Vaitla

- Poster
- Directed by: Srinu Vaitla
- Written by: Chintapalli Ramana (Dialogues)
- Screenplay by: Srinu Vaitla
- Produced by: Ramoji Rao
- Starring: Akash; Rekha; Tanu Roy; Venkat
- Cinematography: Sameer Reddy
- Edited by: Kola Bhaskar
- Music by: Devi Sri Prasad
- Production company: Ushakiran Movies
- Distributed by: Mayuri
- Release date: 28 September 2001
- Running time: 132 minutes
- Country: India
- Language: Telugu
- Box office: ₹10 crore distributors' share

Anandam (transl. Happiness) is a 2001 Indian Telugu-language romance film, directed by Srinu Vaitla and starring Akash, Rekha, Tanu Roy, and Venkat. The music of the film was composed by Devi Sri Prasad. The film was a hit at the box office and ran for 200 days in two centers, 175 days in two centers and 100 days in all major centers. It was a commercial and critical success of the time. This film made Akash an overnight star of the Telugu film industry. The film was remade in Kannada as Ananda, in Tamil as Inidhu Inidhu Kaadhal Inidhu, both versions being produced by Ramoji Rao and in Hindi as Thoda Tum Badlo Thoda Hum.

== Plot ==
Kiran (Akash) and Aishwarya (Rekha) are neighbours since childhood and always fight with each other on trivial things. Kiran hates her so much that he feels relieved when she moves to Ooty along with her parents. There, Aishwarya comes across an unopened greeting card addressed to Deepika (Tanu Roy). She learns that Deepika's family were the previous tenants in that home and tries to find out the whereabouts of Deepika to hand over the greeting card. But she finds out that Deepika committed suicide unwilling to marry the person chosen by her parents and as her plans of elopement failed as her boyfriend did not come to rescue her.

Aishwarya feels bad for Deepika and tries to leave the matter, but couldn't when she finds letters written by Vamsi, Deepika's boyfriend. She reads them and gets moved by the emotion in it. She decides to break the information of Deepika's suicide to Vamsi, but first, she writes a letter to him as Deepika to prepare him for the bad news. On the other hand, Vamsi was no more as he dies in an accident while coming to Deepika to marry her. Incidentally, Kiran was Vamsi's friend and receives the letter written by Aishwarya. He too wants to prepare Deepika slowly for bad news and write her back as Vamsi. They continue exchanging letters for some more time and at last decide to break the news and arrange a meeting.

When they see each other instead of Deepika and Vamsi, they get shocked and slowly reveal the truth to each other. They both get impressed with each other for the sympathetic and competent handling of the sensitive matter. They move back to their places but start to having feelings for each other. Slowly they express their emotions and become one.

== Cast ==
- Akash as Kiran
- Rekha as Aishwarya
- Tanu Roy as Deepika
- Venkat as Vamsi
- Chandra Mohan as Aishwarya's father
- Tanikella Bharani as Kiran's father
- Dharmavarapu Subramanyam as College Lecturer
- Brahmanandam as House Owner
- Chitram Srinu as Chandu
- Shiva Reddy as Purse
- Ramachandra as Kiran's friend
- Sudha as Aishwarya's mother
- Delhi Rajeswari as Kiran's mother
- M S Narayana as House Owner
- Jaya Prakash Reddy as Police Officer
- Banerjee as Deepika's father
- Jenny as College lecturer
- Shankar Melkote as House Owner
- Babloo as Kiran's friend
- Nutan Prasad
- Shwetha Menon in a special appearance in the song "Mona Lisa"

== Production ==
Uday Kiran and Shriya Saran were initially considered for the lead roles. Newcomer Akash was cast as the lead despite not knowing Telugu at the time. He wrote down his dialogues in Tamil and English. The voice for Akash was given by music composer Sri. Rekha Vedavyas made her Telugu debut with this film. Jayaprakash Reddy turned comedian with this film. The film was shot in a single schedule at Ooty, Visakhapatnam and Film City.

== Soundtrack ==
The soundtrack is composed by Devi Sri Prasad. The soundtrack of the movie is released through Mayuri Audio. The songs were well received.

Anandam

Soundtrack album by Devi Sri Prasad
- Released: 20 August 2001
- Recorded: 2001
- Genre: Film soundtrack
- Length: 29:54
- Label: Mayuri Audio
- Producer: Devi Sri Prasad

Devi Sri Prasad chronology
Navvuthu Bathakalira (2001)	Anandam (2001)	Kalusukovalani (2002)

Tracklist
No.	Title	Lyrics	Artist(s)	Length
1.	"Anandam"	Sirivennela Seetharama Sastry	Tippu	4:22
2.	"Kanulu Terichinna"	Sirivennela Seetharama Sastry	Mallikarjun, Sumangali	4:41
3.	"Monalisa"	Bhuvanachandra	Devi Sri Prasad, Kalpana	5:01
4.	"Evarina Epudaina" (Male)	Sirivennela Seetharama Sastry	Pratap	1:57
5.	"Evarina Epudaina" (Female)	Sirivennela Seetharama Sastry	Chitra	1:58
6.	"Oka Merupu"	Potula Ravikiran	Sunita Rao	5:08
7.	"Premante Emitante"	Devi Sri Prasad	Devi Sri Prasad, Mallikarjun, Sumangali	5:19
8.	"Theme Music" (Instrumental)			1:28
Total length:				29:54

== Reception ==
Gudipoodi Srihari of The Hindu noted, "Dialogues prove to be the basic strength of the film, particularly during the humorous scenes. Akash and Rekha make a good pair and their performances suit the characters they play". E. M. Bhargava of Full Hyderabad opined, "credit should be given to the director for treating the story with a lot of care (pardoning him a few unnecessary scenes) and for creating the feel good factor. The film certainly becomes worth a watch". Telugu Cinema wrote "The film reminds Ushakiron's earlier Nuvve Kavali several times in terms of its scenes, dialogues, locations, settings, etc. Of course, similarity does not extend to the former's quality. Despite all this the film could be a time pass".

== Accolades ==
Year	Award	Category	Nominee	Result	Ref.
2002	Cinema Express Awards	Best Film – Telugu	Anandam	Won	
2002	Cinema Express Awards	Best Actor – Telugu	Jai Akash	Won	

== Dropped sequel ==
In 2013, Jai Akash announced that he was working towards directing a sequel to the film titled Anandam Aarambam and had cast a completely new team from the original; however it was shelved.
