= Pakarathinu Pakaram =

- Directed by: T Krishna
- Production company: Ushakiran Movies
- Distributed by: Ushakiran Movies
- Release date: 9 October 1986
- Country: India
- Language: Malayalam

Pakarathinu Pakaram is a 1986 Indian Malayalam film, directed by T Krishna. It is a remake of Telugu film Pratighatana.
