= Popula Pette =

1997 Telugu television series

- Genre: Comedy drama
- Created by: Jandhyala
- Written by: Jandhyala
- Directed by: Jandhyala
- Starring: Naresh; Kinnera; Dharmavarapu Subramanyam; Sakshi Ranga Rao
- Country of origin: India
- Original language: Telugu

Production
- Producer: Ramoji Rao
- Production company: Usha Kiran Movies

Original release
- Network: ETV
- Release: 24 January 1997

Popula Pette (lit. 'Spice box') is a 1997 Indian Telugu-language comedy-drama television series created and directed by Jandhyala. Produced by Ramoji Rao under the Usha Kiran Movies banner, the series premiered on 24 January 1997, and aired on ETV every Friday, with episodes having a runtime of approximately 20 to 24 minutes. The show features Naresh, Kinnera, Dharmavarapu Subramanyam, and Sakshi Ranga Rao in key roles.

Set in the middle-class colony of Ananda Nilayam, humorously referred to as "Popula Pette" by outsiders, the series revolves around the lives of several eccentric families navigating everyday challenges with humour. Popula Pette marked Jandhyala's only directorial project for television. The series was praised for its clean humour, family-oriented content, and portrayal of middle-class life. It is considered an influential show in Telugu television, often cited as a precursor to later series like Amrutham.

== Premise ==
The series is set in Ananda Nilayam, a middle-class colony populated by diverse families, humorously referred to as "Popula Pette" (spice box) by outsiders, symbolizing the variety of its residents.

The series follows the lives of several quirky families. Kameswara Rao, affectionately called "Kamesam," lives with his movie-obsessed wife and their mischievous son, Babloo. While Kamesam works hard to save money, his wife remains absorbed in films, and Babloo frequently causes trouble with his antics.

Another family in the colony is Anjaneyulu and his wife, who have nine children due to poor family planning, leading to frequent visits from extended relatives. Panakala Rao, a member of another family, is known for his "poonakalu" (sudden convulsions or trances), which he sometimes feigns to avoid the control of his domineering wife. Other eccentric characters include the "Ice Cream Aunty," who constantly craves ice cream and forgets everything else in her pursuit, and Appa Rao, a tailor who is known for his frequent use of cuss words.

== Cast ==
- Naresh as Kameswara Rao "Kamesam"
- Kinnera
- Dharmavarapu Subramanyam as Panakala Rao
- Krishnaveni
- Sakshi Ranga Rao as Anjaneyulu
- Alapati Lakshmi
- Subbaraya Sarma
- Mamatha
- Gundu Hanumantha Rao as Lottery Ticket Seller
- Master Sadanandam as Babloo
- AVS as Babloo's school teacher
- Kallu Chidambaram
- Rajeev Kanakala

== Production ==
Popula Pette marked the television directorial debut of Jandhyala, a prominent filmmaker known for his family-oriented comedies in Telugu cinema. The series, which aired on ETV in 1997, remains Jandhyala's only directorial project for television. True to his cinematic style, the show centered on middle-class struggles and family dynamics, blending humour with domestic issues. The episodes maintained a family-friendly tone, avoiding explicit content or jokes.

The casting of actor Naresh, who had previously collaborated with Jandhyala on several successful films such as Rendu Jella Seetha (1983), Choopulu Kalasina Subhavela (1988), and Hai Hai Nayaka (1989) was a significant element of the series. Their established professional partnership brought familiarity and appeal to the show, capitalizing on their successful comedic rapport.

The series depicted the everyday lives and challenges of middle-class families, exploring domestic issues, relationships, and personal struggles through comedy and subtle satire. A notable episode features a child who introduces fake parents to his teacher to avoid punishment from his real parents.

== Release ==
Popula Pette premiered on 24 January 1997, and aired every Friday, with each episode having a runtime of approximately 20 to 24 minutes. Despite its popularity, the series concluded within a year due to unforeseen circumstances.

In recent years, Popula Pette was re-telecast on the ETV Win OTT platform, gaining a new audience. Select episodes were also made available on YouTube, allowing the series to reach a wider and modern viewership.

== Reception ==
Popula Pette was appreciated for its humour, character development, and focus on relatable themes. Its family-friendly approach, avoiding explicit jokes, and effective blend of drama and comedy were well received. The on-screen chemistry between lead actors Naresh, Subramanyam, and Ranga Rao also contributed to the show's appeal.

Although it concluded after a year due to unforeseen circumstances, the series is regarded as a notable Telugu television comedy and is considered an influence on later shows like Amrutham.
