= Panchatantram =

Telugu children's television series (2003–2007)

- Genre: Children's television series
- Based on: Panchatantra
- Written by: T. P. Maharathi; Amarkant Dubey
- Screenplay by: Sanjit Ghosh
- Directed by: Sanjit Ghosh
- Theme music composer: Kalyan Sen Barat
- Country of origin: India
- Original language: Telugu
- No. of episodes: 145+

Production
- Producer: Ramoji Rao
- Cinematography: Nilotpal Shankar; Chakri
- Editors: P. V. Narasimha Rao; S. Ravi Kumar; G. Sai Shashank
- Running time: 20–22 minutes
- Production company: Usha Kiran Television

Original release
- Network: ETV Telugu
- Release: 2003 – 2007

Panchatantram is an Indian Telugu-language children's television series that aired on ETV from 2003 to 2007. Produced by Ramoji Rao under Usha Kiran Television, the series was directed by puppeteer Sanjit Ghosh. It is based on the ancient Indian fable collection Panchatantra, attributed to Vishnu Sharma. It features stories with animal characters that convey moral lessons, using traditional puppetry techniques alongside modern special effects.

The series, consisting of over 145 episodes, was broadcast on Sundays from 9:00 AM to 9:30 AM. It incorporated various forms of traditional Indian puppetry, including rod, string, and glove puppetry, blended with advanced graphics and visual effects. Panchatantram was also dubbed into multiple Indian languages, including Bengali, Odia, Marathi, Gujarati, Kannada, and Hindi, and was aired on regional ETV channels across India.

Noted for its educational content, the series aimed to impart values such as honesty, wisdom, and compassion. It is recognized for combining traditional storytelling methods with contemporary production techniques, contributing to its popularity among children.

== Premise ==
The series adapted stories from the Panchatantra, a compilation of ancient Indian fables attributed to the scholar Vishnu Sharma. These tales, known for their moral lessons conveyed through animal characters, have been a cornerstone of Indian culture. Panchatantram combined traditional storytelling with modern visual techniques, using puppetry as its central medium to narrate these timeless stories.

== Production ==
Panchatantram was produced by Ramoji Rao under Usha Kiran Television and directed by puppeteer Sanjit Ghosh. The series incorporated traditional puppetry alongside modern production techniques, utilizing advanced graphics and special effects to create an engaging visual presentation that combined elements of Indian storytelling with contemporary aesthetics.

The production featured various forms of traditional Indian puppetry, such as rod puppetry from West Bengal and Orissa, string puppetry practiced in Rajasthan, Orissa, Tamil Nadu, Karnataka, Maharashtra, and Assam, and glove puppetry from Orissa and Kerala. These traditional art forms were incorporated alongside modern visual effects to enhance the overall presentation.

== Broadcast ==
Panchatantram was initially broadcast on ETV Telugu, airing every Sunday morning from 9:00 AM to 9:30 AM.

The series was also dubbed into multiple languages and telecast on various ETV regional channels, including ETV Bangla, where it aired on Sundays at 9:30 AM, and other regional channels such as ETV Kannada, ETV Marathi, ETV Oriya, ETV Gujarati, ETV Madhya Pradesh, ETV Uttar Pradesh, ETV Bihar, and ETV Rajasthan, where it was scheduled for Sundays at 10:30 AM.

The extensive dubbing and regional broadcasts expanded its reach, allowing the series to connect with a diverse audience across India.

== Reception ==
Panchatantram aimed to impart values such as honesty, wisdom, and compassion through its narratives. It became a prominent children's television program in Telugu, appreciated for its combination of educational and entertainment elements. The series was recognized for its innovative presentation and cultural relevance.

The show is regarded as a significant contribution to Indian children's television for its successful integration of traditional storytelling with modern production techniques. Its adaptation of the Panchatantra stories ensured that the moral lessons of these timeless tales remained accessible to contemporary audiences.
