= Chor Bazaar (film) =

2022 film by B. Jeevan Reddy

- Theatrical release poster
- Directed by: B. Jeevan Reddy
- Written by: B. Jeevan Reddy
- Produced by: V. S. Raju; Alluri Suresh Varma
- Starring: Akash Puri; Gehna Sippy; Subbaraju; Sunil; Sampoornesh Babu
- Cinematography: Jagadeesh Cheekati
- Edited by: Anwar Ali; Prabhu Deva
- Music by: Priyadarshan Balasubramanian
- Production company: I. V. Production
- Distributed by: UV Creations
- Release date: 24 June 2022
- Country: India
- Language: Telugu

Chor Bazaar (transl. Thief Market) is a 2022 Indian Telugu-language romantic action film directed by B. Jeevan Reddy, and produced by I V Production. It stars Akash Puri, Gehna Sippy, Subbaraju, Sunil and Sampoornesh Babu. The music is composed by Suresh Bobbili.

Chor Bazaar was theatrically released on 24 June 2022.

== Cast ==
- Akash Puri as Bachchan Saab
- Gehna Sippy as Simran
- Subbaraju
- Sunil as Home Mister of Telangana
- Sampoornesh Babu
- Archana as Bachchan Saab's guardian
- Kancharapalem Raju as Simran's father
- Venu Yeldandi
- Praveen
- Y. Kasi Viswanath as Judge
- Racha Ravi
- Laxman Meesala
- Namrita Malla
- Bhanu Prakash
- Yadam Raju
- Manikanta Varanasi
- Santhosh Singuru
- Manik Reddy

== Production ==
=== Development ===
Following the 2021 film Romantic, Akash Puri teamed up with director B. Jeevan Reddy under the banner I V Production for the film Chor Bazaar.

=== Filming ===
Principal photography was commenced in February 2021.

== Music ==
Chor Bazaar

Soundtrack album by Suresh Bobbili
- Released: 2022
- Recorded: 2021–22
- Genre: Feature film soundtrack
- Language: Telugu
- Label: T-Series
- Producers: Suresh Bobbili; Priyadarshan Balasubramanian

Suresh Bobbili chronology
Virata Parvam (2022)	Chor Bazaar (2022)

Singles from Chor Bazaar
- 1. "Chor Bazaar Title Song" Released: 18 February 2022; 2. "Jada" Released: 2 May 2022; 3. "Noonugu Meesala" Released: 3 June 2022

The music rights of the film are sold to T-Series.The music of the film is composed by Suresh Bobbili.

No.	Title	Lyrics	Singer(s)	Length
1.	"Chor Bazaar Title Song"	Asura and Selvin Francis	Sruthi Rajani	3:18
2.	"Jada"	Mittapalli Surendra	Ram Miriyala	3:34
3.	"Noonugu Meesala"	Kasarla Shyam	Lakshmi Meghana	3:04

== Release ==
Chor Bazaar was theatrically released on 24 June 2022.

== Reception ==
Calling it a "flop show", a reviewer from The Hans India wrote: "The routine story and narration, coupled with the lackluster screenplay and direction played the spoilsport." Sanju of Sakshi also criticized the screenplay and direction while appreciating Puri's performance.

ABP Desam's Saketh Reddy Eleti felt that the premise of diamond heist was interesting but the film was let down by poor execution. Writing for Samayam Telugu, Banda Kalyan also criticized the film for its writing and direction.
