= Puri Sangeet =

Indian music company

- Company type: Public
- Industry: Entertainment
- Founded: Hyderabad, Andhra Pradesh in 2009
- Founder: Puri Jagannadh
- Headquarters: Hyderabad, India
- Key people: Puri Jagannadh
- Products: Music
- Owner: Puri Jagannadh
- Parent: Puri Jagannadh
- Subsidiaries: Puri Jagannadh Touring Talkies; Vaishno Academy

Puri Sangeet is a music company in India. It was established by Puri Jagannadh, an Indian Telugu film director and producer. The company is based in Hyderabad, Telangana.

== Film soundtracks ==
Year	Film	Music director(s)
2018	Mehbooba	Sandeep Chowta
2017	Rogue	Sunil Kashyap
2016	Araku Road Lo	Rahul Raj
2015	Jyothi Lakshmi	Sunil Kashyap
2014	Rowdy	Sai Karthik
2014	Prathighatana	M. M. Keeravani; Yeshwanth Nag
2014	Heart Attack	Anup Rubens
2013	Satya 2 (Telugu)	Nitin Raikwar; Sanjeev-Darshan; Kary Arora; Shree D
2013	Entha Andanga Unnave	Yogeshwara Sharma
2013	Pranamai Nuvvila	Ravi Varma
2013	Mandodari	Chinni Charan
2013	Saradaga Ammayitho	Ravi Varma
2009	Bumper Offer	Raghu Kunche
