= ISmart Shankar =

2019 Indian film by Puri Jagannadh

iSmart Shankar
- Theatrical release poster
- Directed by: Puri Jagannadh
- Written by: Puri Jagannadh
- Produced by: Puri Jagannadh; Charmme Kaur
- Starring: Ram Pothineni; Satyadev; Nabha Natesh; Nidhhi Agerwal
- Cinematography: Raj Thota
- Edited by: Junaid Siddiqui
- Music by: Mani Sharma
- Production company: Puri Jagannadh Touring Talkies: Puri Connects
- Release date: 18 July 2019
- Running time: 141 minutes
- Country: India
- Language: Telugu
- Budget: ₹15–20 crore (Note: Deccan Chronicle estimates the film's budget to be ₹150 million. The Hans India estimates the film's budget to be ₹200 million.)
- Box office: est.₹75–85 crore (Note: The Times of India estimates the film worldwide gross to be over ₹750 million. Sakshi Telugu estimates the film worldwide gross to be ₹780 million. Sakshi Post estimates the film worldwide gross to be ₹850 million.)

iSmart Shankar is a 2019 Indian Telugu-language science fiction action film directed by Puri Jagannadh, who co-produced the film with Charmme Kaur. It stars Ram Pothineni, alongside Satyadev, Nabha Natesh, Nidhhi Agerwal, Ashish Vidyarthi and Raj Deepak Shetty. The music was composed by Mani Sharma, while cinematography and editing were handled by Raj Thota and Junaid Siddiqui. In the film, an assassin helps the police investigate a high-profile case when a slain police officer's memories are transferred into his brain.

iSmart Shankar was released theatrically on 18 July 2019 and became a box office success. A sequel titled Double iSmart was released on 15 August 2024.

== Plot ==
iSmart Shankar, a street-smart assassin, works under another assassin Kaka. One day, Shankar falls in love with Chandini and tries various ways to impress her. Despite being annoyed at first, Chandini reciprocates his feelings. Under Kaka's orders, Shankar kills CM Kasi Vishwanath and escapes to Goa with Chandini. However, the cops learn about their location and a shootout ensues in which Chandini gets killed in a cross-fire and Shankar gets arrested.

Meanwhile, Sara, a neuroscientist, is working on memory transfer and has achieved successful results with rats. Sara's fianceè Arun, a CBI officer, is investigating Kasi Vishwanath's death and deduces that a higher force has planned and killed him. Shankar escapes from prison and deduces that Kaka had a major role in Chandini's death and has been ordered to kill Shankar. Kaka tries to escape, but Shankar shoots Kaka in Sara's car.

When Arun is about crack the case, he gets killed by the goons. Chandrakanth, Arun's superior and CBI chief, is desperate to know about the killer, where they transfer Arun's memory to Shankar with Sara's help, knowing that Arun's memory will remove his past. Shankar wakes up and experiences memories that are not his own, where he gets enraged after Sara reveals the truth to him and realizes that he will forget about Chandni in a few days.

Shankar experiences brief flashes when he becomes Arun, but reverts to being Shankar. Shankar finds Arun's house and discovers a bag that has evidences about the killer, where he calls Chandrakanth to meet him in Goa. When Arun is about to reveal the identity of the murderers, he reverts to Shankar and escapes with Sara at knifepoint. After a few events, Shankar reverts to Arun and reveals to Chandrakanth that Kasi Vishwanath's son Devendra and brother-in-law Central Minister Ramamurthy are the masterminds behind the assassination.

Arun devises a plan to arrest Devendra and Ramamurthy with the evidence in Varanasi. Devendra gets exposed and escapes and Arun follows him, but Devendra and his men continuously beat Arun in his head, which results in Arun getting reverted to Shankar. Sara tells Shankar that Devendra is behind Chandni's death. After an intense fight, Shankar kills Devendra, thus avenging Chandini's death. Sara and Arun leave for Hong Kong on a vacation and Arun proposes to Sara, who happily agrees, but Arun reverts to Shankar.

== Cast ==
- Ram Pothineni as Ustaad "iSmart" Shankar / Arun (Memory Transfer)
- Satyadev as Arun, a CBI officer (Original Human Version)
- Nabha Natesh as Chandini
- Nidhhi Agerwal as Dr. Sarah
- Sayaji Shinde as CBI Chief Chandrakanth
- Ashish Vidyarthi as Ramamoorthy, Central Minister of India
- Raj Deepak Shetty as Devendra Viswanath
- Tulasi as Viswanath's wife
- Getup Srinu as Shankar's friend
- Aziz Naser as Ramamurthy's Contractor for assassin to kill Shankar
- Puneet Issar as CM Kashi Viswanath
- Madhusudhan Rao as Kaka
- Vikas Sethi as DCP Dharam

=== Cameo appearance ===
- Gangavva as a woman in lorry
- Lekha Prajapati in "Bonalu" song
- Puri Jagannadh as himself in the song "iSmart Theme"

== Production ==
Principal photography began in January 2019 in Hyderabad. The first schedule finished in February 2019. The second schedule took place in Goa in March 2019. The action sequences were shot in April 2019 and the third schedule took place in Varanasi. The filming wrapped in May 2019.

== Soundtrack ==
iSmart Shankar

Soundtrack album by Mani Sharma
- Released: 4 July 2019
- Genre: Feature film soundtrack
- Length: 21:09
- Language: Telugu
- Label: Zee Music South

Mani Sharma chronology
Devadas (2018)	iSmart Shankar (2019)
External audio
- Audio Jukebox on YouTube

Track list
No.	Title	Lyrics	Singer(s)	Length
1.	"Dimaak Kharaab"	Kasarla Shyam	Keerthana Sharma, Saketh Komanduri	4:40
2.	"Zindabad Zindabad"	Bhaskarabhatla Ravi Kumar	Sarath Santhosh, Ramya Behara	4:40
3.	"iSmart Theme"	Bhaskarabhatla Ravi Kumar	Anurag Kulkarni	4:12
4.	"Undipo"	Bhaskarabhatla Ravi Kumar	Anurag Kulkarni, Ramya Behara	5:09
5.	"Bonalu"	Kasarla Shyam	Rahul Sipligunj, Mohana Bhogaraju	5:51
Total length:				21:09

== Release ==
Ismart Shankar was released on 18 July 2019.

=== Home media ===
The satellite and digital streaming rights of the film were sold to Zee Network. The film was dubbed in Hindi by Aditya Movies.

== Reception ==
iSmart Shankar received mixed reviews from critics with praise for the Ram's performance, music and action sequences, but criticized its script.

=== Critical response ===
Hemanth Kumar of Firstpost gave 3/5 stars and wrote "Despite its crassness at times, iSmart Shankar strikes a chord largely due to its story, Puri Jagannadh’s conviction, and Mani Sharma’s compelling background score."

Neeshita Nyayapati of The Times of India gave 2.5/5 stars and wrote "In this make-believe world, when rules change by-the-minute, it’s hard to give a damn." Sify gave 2.5/5 stars and wrote "iSmart Shankar is aimed at frontbenchers. Despite the idea of transplantation of memories being new, the rest of the story and its treatment are over-the-top and too clichéd. This is a loud mass action-thriller."

== Awards and nominations ==
Date of ceremony	Award	Category	Recipient(s) and nominee(s)	Result	Ref.
11 January 2020	Zee Cine Awards Telugu	Best Director	Puri Jagannadh	Won	
11 January 2020	Zee Cine Awards Telugu	Best Producer	Charmy Kaur	Won	
11 January 2020	Zee Cine Awards Telugu	Best Music Director	Mani Sharma	Won	
11 January 2020	Zee Cine Awards Telugu	Sensational Star of the Year	Ram Pothineni	Won	
11 January 2020	Zee Cine Awards Telugu	Best Actor (Male)	Ram Pothineni	Nominated	
18 September 2021	South Indian International Movie Awards	Best Director – Telugu	Puri Jagannadh	Nominated	
18 September 2021	South Indian International Movie Awards	Best Cinematographer – Telugu	Raj Thota	Nominated	
18 September 2021	South Indian International Movie Awards	Best Actor – Telugu	Ram Pothineni	Nominated	
18 September 2021	South Indian International Movie Awards	Best Music Director – Telugu	Mani Sharma	Nominated	
18 September 2021	South Indian International Movie Awards	Best Male Playback Singer – Telugu	Anurag Kulkarni for "iSmart Theme"	Won	

== Sequel ==
In September 2022, it has been reported that the film's spiritual sequel is currently being developed due to Puri Jagannadh's film Jana Gana Mana being shelved after the box office disappointment of Jagannadh's previous film Liger. An official announcement of the spiritual sequel titled Double iSmart has been announced in May 2023. Double iSmart was released on 15 August 2024, coinciding with Independence Day, which became a box-office bomb.
