= Akash Puri =

Indian actor

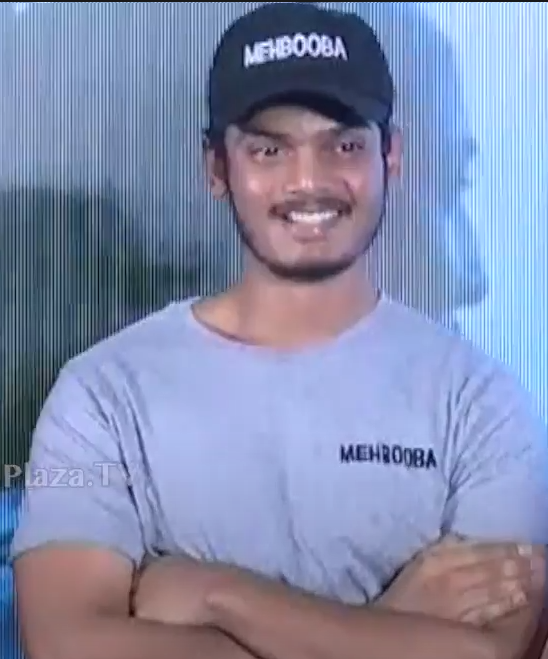
- Akash in 2018
- Born: Akash Puri; 25 July 1997 (age 29); Hyderabad, Andhra Pradesh (now Telangana) India
- Occupation: Actor
- Years active: 2007–present
- Father: Puri Jagannadh

Akash Puri is an Indian actor who works in Telugu films and is the son of renowned filmmaker Puri Jagannadh. He started his career in 2008 as a child actor in the films Chirutha, Bujjigadu, Ek Niranjan, The Lotus Pond, Businessman, Dhoni and Gabbar Singh.

Puri debuted as a lead and adult with the 2015 film Andhra Pori. His notable films include Mehbooba and Romantic.

== Career ==
Puri made his debut as a child artist in Chirutha as a young Charan in 2007. The film was directed by his father Puri Jagannadh, starring Ramcharan and Neha Sharma. He has also done more 7 films as a child artist which includes Bujjigadu, Ek Niranjan, The Lotus Pond, Businessman, Dhoni and Gabbar Singh.

Puri made his debut as a lead actor in 2015 with the film Andhra Pori. After that, he made a film Mehbooba, which was directed by his father Puri Jagannadh. The film achieved a commercial hit. He also starred in romantic film with Ketika Sharma which got mixed talk from viewers.

He will next feature in romantic-action film Chor Bazaar directed by B. Jeevan Reddy.

== Filmography ==
†	Denotes films that have not yet been released

Year	Title	Role	Language	Notes	Ref.
2007	Chirutha	Young Charan	Telugu	Child actor	
2008	Bujjigadu	Young Bujji	Telugu	Child actor	
2009	Ek Niranjan	Sameera's guitar student	Telugu	Child actor	
2010	The Lotus Pond	Neeraj	English	Child actor	
2012	Businessman	Younger Vijay Surya	Telugu	Child actor	
2012	Dhoni	Karthick Subramaniam	Telugu; Tamil	Child actor	
2012	Gabbar Singh	Young Venkataratnam Naidu / Young Gabbar Singh	Telugu	Child actor	
2015	Andhra Pori	Narsingh	Telugu	Adult debut	
2018	Mehbooba	Roshan / Kabir	Telugu		
2021	Romantic	Vasco De Gama	Telugu		
2022	Chor Bazaar	Bachchan Saab	Telugu		
TBA	Thalvar †	TBA	Telugu	Post-Production	

=== Playback singer ===
- "Mera Naam Vasco De Gama"
