= Sravana Bhargavi =

Indian playback singer

- Born: Ravuri Sravana Bhargavi; 16 August 1989 (age 37); India
- Occupation: Playback singer
- Years active: 2009-present
- Spouse: Vedala Hemachandra (m.2013 -present)

Ravuri Sravana Bhargavi (born 16 August 1989) is an Indian playback singer. She has recorded several songs in Telugu films.

== Personal life ==
Sravana Bhargavi got engaged to singer Vedala Hemachandra on 9 December 2012 in Hyderabad, India and married him on 14 February 2013. She has a daughter named Shikhara Chandrika, who was born on 2 July 2016.

== Career ==
Bhargavi hosted a show in 92.7 Big FM in Hyderabad, India. She did voice acting in the films Love Failure and Gabbar Singh.

=== Other work ===
She has hosted the show Bol Baby Bol along with her husband Hemachandra. The show is telecasted on Gemini TV. She has also performed in the TV show "Super Singer", which was telecasted on MAA TV.

== Discography ==
=== As playback singer ===
Year	Film	Song	Composer	Notes
2009	Billa	"Bommali"	Mani Sharma	
2009	Mitrudu	"Thellavarithey"	Mani Sharma	
2009	Boni	"Kadantana"	Ramana Gogula	
2010	Seeta Ramula Kalyanam Lankalo	"Basic Ga"	Anup Rubens	
2010	Kalavar King	"Eidhe Eidhe"	Anil R	
2010	Simha	"Simhamanti Chinnode"	Chakri	
2010	Brahmalokam To Yamalokam Via Bhulokam	"O Manasa O Manasa"	M. M. Srilekha	
2010	Yemaindi Ee Vela	"Thunigalle Unnavule"	Chakri	
2010	Kadhalagi	"Manadhil Poochedi"	A. R. Reihana	Tamil film
2010	Andari Bandhuvaya	"Nandamaya"	Anup Rubens	
2010	Khaleja	"Bhoom Shakenaka"	Mani Sharma	
2011	Badrinath	"Ambadhari"	M. M. Keeravani	
2011	Badrinath	"In the Night"	M. M. Keeravani	
2011	Dongala Mutha	"Debbaku Tha Dongala Mutha"	Amar Mohile	
2011	Kandireega	"Preme Poynnadhile"	S. S. Thaman	
2011	Mugguru	"Chiki Bum Bum"	Koti	
2011	Seema Tapakai	"Akasamlo Okatara"	Vandemataram Srinivas	
2011	Seema Tapakai	"I Love U Baby"	Vandemataram Srinivas	
2011	Raaj	"Nanne Nenu Marichipoya"	Koti	
2011	Vykuntapali	"Dhadak Dhadak"	Anil Gopireddy	
2011	Madatha Kaja	"Ninnila Choosthu Unte"	Sri Vasanth	
2011	Madatha Kaja	"Gungudu Gudu Gudu"	Sri Vasanth	
2011	Teen Maar	"Ale Bale"	Mani Sharma	
2011	Teen Maar	"Barbi Bommaki"	Mani Sharma	
2011	Solo	"Singapore"	Mani Sharma	
2011	Mirapakay	"Chirugaley	S. S. Thaman	
2011	Rajanna	"lachummamma Lachumamma"	M. M. Keeravani	
2012	Dammu	"Dhammu Dhammu"	M. M. Keeravani	
2012	Dammu	"Vastu Baagunde"	M. M. Keeravani	
2012	Life is beautiful	"Amma Ani Kothaga"	Mickey J. Meyer	
2012	Rebel	"Google"	Raghava Lawrence	
2012	Racha	"Racha"	Mani Sharma	
2012	Cameraman Ganga Tho Rambabu	"Joramochindi"	Mani Sharma	
2012	Denikaina Ready	"Panchcha Kattuko"	Yuvan Shankar Raja and Chakri	
2012	Srimannarayana	"Aaradugula Abbayi"	Chakri	
2012	Krishnam Vande Jagadgurum	"Areyrey Pasi Manasa"	Mani Sharma	
2012	Six	"Surru Surru"	Ravi Varma	
2012	Disco	"Disco"	Mantra Anand	
2012	Maattrraan	"Rendai Thirigae"	Harris Jayaraj	
2012	Bodyguard	"Jiya jaley"	S. S. Thaman	
2012	Mythri	"Aa Ra Ra Pedave"	Vikas	
2012	Nandeeswarudu	"Naa Rupe Mirchi"	Parthasaradhi	
2012	Yamudiki Mogudu	"Pistolu Pilladanivo"	Koti	
2012	Eega	"Eega Eega Eega"	M. M. Keeravani	
2012	Eega	"Eega Eega Eega (Remix)"	M. M. Keeravani	
2012	Dracula	"Punnami Raathri"	Babith George	
2012	Nippu	"Nippu Slokam"	S. S. Thaman	
2013	Venkatadri Express	"Nachave Ammakachallo"	Ramana Gogula	
2013	Potugadu	"Super Figure"	Achu Rajamani	
2013	Chukkalanti Ammayi Chakkanaina Abbayi	"Cheli Cheli"	Anup Rubens	
2013	Chukkalanti Ammayi Chakkanaina Abbayi	"Dilse Jumore	Anup Rubens	
2014	Yuddham	"Athadoka Sainyam"	Chakri	
2014	Rough	"Edukondala Venkata"	Mani Sharma	
2014	Rough	"Edukondala Venkata Simha"	Mani Sharma	
2014	Love You Bangaram	"Nuvve Naatho"	Mahith Narayan	
2014	Ninnindale	"Bolo Bham Bham"	Mani Sharma	Kannada film
2014	Erra Bus	"Ey Challagaali Challagaali"	Chakri	
2014	Galata	"Naa Peru Divya"	Sunil Kashyap	
2015	S/O Satyamurthy	"Super Machi"	Devi Sri Prasad	
2015	Jyothi Lakshmi	"Chusindhi Chalugaani"	Sunil Kashyap	
2015	Jyothi Lakshmi	"Chetiki Gaajulu"	Sunil Kashyap	
2015	Rey	"Rey (Manthra)"	Chakri	
2015	Asura	"Sukumaara"	Sai Karthik	
2015	Hitudu	"Chinni Chinni"	Koti	
2015	Loafer	"Chutta Beedi"	Sunil Kashyap	
2016	A Aa	"Mummy Returns"	Mickey J. Meyer	
2016	Brahmotsavam	"Put Your Hands Up"	Mickey J. Meyer	
2016	Nannaku Prematho	"Love Dhebba	Devi Sri Prasad	
2016	Nagarahavu	"Lucky Lakkamma"	Gurukiran	Kannada film
2016	Eluka Majaka	"Masthunnadhi"	Ballepalli Mohan	
2016	Speedunnodu	"Bachelor Babu"	Sri Vasanth	
2017	Jaya Janaki Nayaka	"Rangu Rangu Kallajodu"	Devi Sri Prasad	
2017	Middle Class Abbayi	"Yevandoi Nani Garu"	Devi Sri Prasad	
2017	Ek	"Joom Jara"	Mantra Anand	
2018	Srinivasa Kalyanam	"Something Something"	Mickey J. Meyer	
2018	Raa Raa	"Android Phone"	Rap Rock Shakeel	
2019	F2: Fun and Frustration	"Dhan Dhan"	Devi Sri Prasad	
2019	Runam	"Maar Maar"	S V Mallik Teja	
2022	Liger	"Aafat"	Tanishk Bagchi	
2022	Sarkaru Vaari Paata	"Sarkaru Vaari Paata Rap Song	S. S. Thaman	
2023	Agent	"Wild Saala"	Bheems Ceciroleo	
2024	Tiragabadara Saami	"Radhabhai"	Jeevan Babu (JB)	
2024	Bharateeyudu 2 (D)	"Calendar Song"	Anirudh Ravichander	Telugu Dubbed
2024	Hindustani 2 (D)	"Calendar Song"	Anirudh Ravichander	Hindi Dubbed
2024	Lucky Baskhar (D)	"Lucky Baskhar Title Track"	G. V. Prakash Kumar	Kannada Dubbed
2025	Game Changer	"Konda Devara"	Thaman S	
2026	Jetlee	"Satya Is Not Jetlee"	Kaala Bhairava	

== Filmography ==
=== As voice actor ===
Year	Film	Actor	Character	Language	Notes
2012	Kadhalil Sodhappuvadhu Yeppadi	Amala Paul	Parvathi	Telugu	The film was simultaneously produced in both Tamil and Telugu languages. Voiced for the Telugu version titled Love Failure
2012	Gabbar Singh	Shruti Haasan	Bhagyalakshmi	Telugu	
2012	Eega	Samantha Ruth Prabhu	Bindu	Hindi	For the Hindi dubbed version titled Makkhi
2013	Ramayya Vasthavayya	Shruti Haasan	Amullu	Telugu	
2013	Swami Ra Ra	Pooja Ramachandran	Bhanu	Telugu	
2015	Columbus	Seerat Kapoor	Neeraja	Telugu	
