= Galata (film) =

- Film poster
- Directed by: Krishna
- Written by: Krishna
- Produced by: D.Rajendera Prasad Varma
- Starring: Srinivas; Hariprriya
- Music by: Sunil Kashyap
- Production company: Creative Pixel
- Release date: 25 April 2014
- Running time: 140 minutes
- Country: India
- Language: Telugu

Galata is a 2014 Indian Telugu romantic comedy film written and directed by Krishna, making his debut. The film is produced by D.Rajendera Prasad Varma under the banner Creative Pixels. It features Srinivas and Hariprriya in the lead roles, with Nagendra Babu and P. Saikumar in supporting roles. The score and soundtrack for the film is by Sunil Kashyap.

== Cast ==
- Srinivas as Chitti
- Hariprriya as Andaal
- Nagendra Babu
- P. Sai Kumar
- Ali
- Annapurna
- Kondavalasa Lakshmana Rao
- Prudhvi Raj
- Shankar Melkote
- Venu Yeldandi

== Production ==
The film was shot in Hyderabad.

== Soundtrack ==
Galata

Soundtrack album by Sunil Kashyap
- Genre: Feature film soundtrack
- Language: Telugu
- Label: Aditya Music
- Producer: D.Rajendera Prasad Varma

The film's background score and the soundtracks are composed by Sunil Kashyap. The music rights were acquired by Aditya Music.

All lyrics are written by Krishna Chaitanya.

Tracklist
No.	Title	Singer(s)	Length
1.	"Galata"	Baba Sehgal, Suchitra
2.	"Naa Peru Divya"	Sravana Bhargavi
3.	"Mem Konchem"	Suchitra
4.	"Yendaro Mahanubhavulu"	Sesha Chari
5.	"Nee Premalo"	Krishna Chaitanya, Lipsika

== Release ==
The film's release was postponed from April 19 to April 25.
