= Charmy Kaur =

Indian film producer and former actress

Charmme Kaur
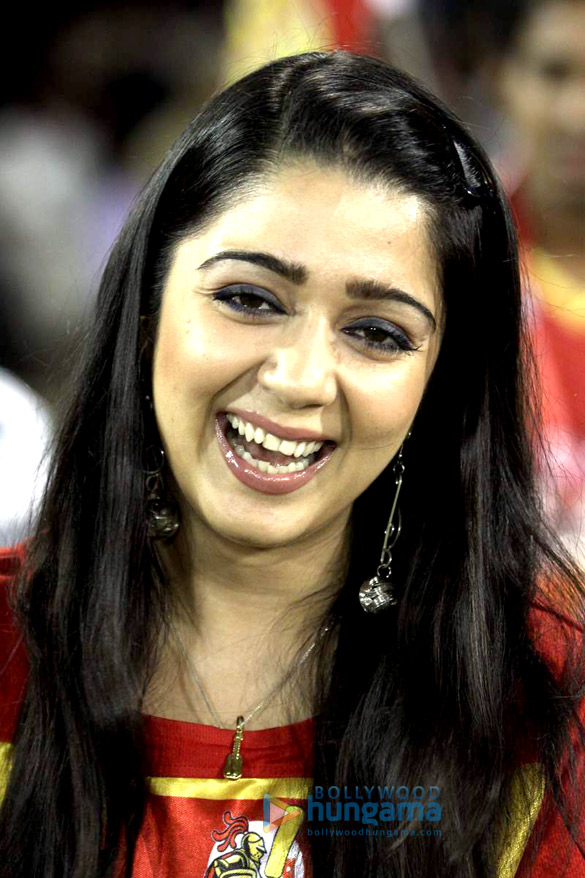
- Kaur in 2014
- Born: 17 May 1987 (age 39); Vasai, Maharashtra, India
- Occupations: Actress; producer
- Years active: 2002–2015 (actress); 2015–present (producer)

Charmy Kaur (born 17 May 1987), also spelt as Charmme or Charmi, is an Indian film producer and former actress. She is well known for her works predominantly in Telugu cinema, as well as a few Tamil, Malayalam, Kannada, and Hindi films. Her most notable works include films such as Mass (2004), Anukokunda Oka Roju (2005), Lakshmi (2006), Pournami (2006), and Rakhi (2006), where she played supporting roles in all these movies except Anukokunda Oka Roju (2005). She is a recipient of two Nandi State Awards.

She then appeared in films such as Mantra (2007), for which she won the state Nandi Award for Best Actress, the subsequent years, she appeared in Manorama (2009), Kavya's Diary (2009) and Mangala (2011) for which she garnered another state Nandi Special Jury Award. Later she also appeared in the Hindi film Bbuddah... Hoga Terra Baap alongside Amitabh Bachchan.

== Career ==
Charmy Kaur made her acting debut in the 2002 Telugu film Nee Thodu Kavali, in which she acted as a housewife at the age of 15. This film was a flop, but helped Charmy in getting noticed by the south Indian film industry. Her next film was T. Rajendar's Kadhal Azhivathillai in Tamil, alongside Silambarasan. During this time she acted in a Malayalam film directed by Vinayan named Kattuchembakam.

Her re-entry to Telugu films happened with Neeke Manasichaanu a film with Srikanth; then in Sri Anjaneyam, directed by Krishna Vamsi, was followed by another drama film Chanti, paired against Ravi Teja. She finally got a big break in Telugu with Gowri, in which she was paired with Sumanth. Again, Charmy paired with Ravi Teja in Dongala Mutha, directed by Ram Gopal Varma. In 2012, she made special appearances in films such as Dhamarukam, Naayak and Yaare Koogadali. She then appeared in Hindi films such as Zila Ghaziabad and R... Rajkumar. She produced and starred in the film Jyothi Lakshmi (2015), directed by Puri Jagannadh. Her next film, Pratighatana, in which she played a journalist, was her 50th film.

Charmy Kaur co-produced Rogue, starring the debuting Ishan, a Telugu and Kannada bilingual film and also Paisa Vasool, starring Nandamuri Bala Krishna. All three movies were directed by South Indian star director Puri Jagannadh, who is the core founder of "Puri Connects", a production house along with media related events and marketing and designing and talent management company. She co-produced the film Mehbooba under the Puri Connects banner along with Puri Jagannadh, who has directed and also co-produced the film on Puri Jagannadh Touring Talkies Banner, launching his son Akash Puri. In May 2019, Charmy Kaur announced she had quit her acting career, and would continue as a film producer.

== Filmography ==
=== As actress ===
Year	Film	Role	Language	Notes
2002	Nee Thodu Kavali	Manasa	Telugu	
2002	Kadhal Azhivathillai	Charmi	Tamil	
2002	Kattuchembakam	Chembakam	Malayalam	
2003	Kadhal Kisu Kisu	Indhu	Tamil	
2003	Aahaa Ethanai Azhagu	Divya Natarajan	Tamil	
2003	Neeke Manasichaanu	Sridevi	Telugu	
2004	Sri Anjaneyam	Padma	Telugu	
2004	Gowri	Sweta	Telugu	
2004	Chanti	Vasantha Laxmi	Telugu	
2004	Mass	Priya	Telugu	
2005	Chakram	Lakshmi	Telugu	
2005	Anukokunda Oka Roju	Sahasra	Telugu	
2005	Political Rowdy	Kaveri	Telugu	
2005	Allari Pidugu	Subbalakshmi	Telugu	
2006	Chukkallo Chandrudu	Sandhya	Telugu	
2006	Lakshmi	Sailaja	Telugu	
2006	Style	Shruti	Telugu	
2006	Pournami	Chandrakala	Telugu	
2006	Chinnodu	Anjali	Telugu	
2006	Rakhi	Gowri	Telugu	
2007	Lava Kusha	Sinchana	Kannada	
2007	Mantra	Mantra	Telugu	
2008	Sundarakanda	Pinky	Telugu	
2008	Bhale Dongalu	Raksha	Telugu	Special appearance
2008	Michael Madana Kamaraju	Archana	Telugu	
2008	Kousalya Supraja Rama	Supraja	Telugu	
2008	King	Herself	Telugu	Special appearance
2009	Laadam	Angel	Tamil	
2009	Manorama	Geetanjali	Telugu	
2009	Kavya's Diary	Kavya	Telugu	
2009	Mahatma		Telugu	Special appearance in the song "Dailamo Dailamo"
2010	Aagathan	Shreya	Malayalam	
2010	Indhu		Telugu	
2010	Sye Aata	Malliswari	Telugu	
2010	Ragada	Herself	Telugu	Special appearance
2011	Mangala	Mangala	Telugu	
2011	Dongala Mutha	Rani	Telugu	
2011	Nagaram Nidrapothunna Vela	Niharika	Telugu	
2011	Bbuddah... Hoga Terra Baap	Amrita / Amrutha	Hindi	
2011	Mayagadu	Vandana Chidambaram	Telugu	
2011	Dev S/o Mudde Gowda	Kavya	Kannada	
2012	Thappana	Mallika	Malayalam	
2012	Damarukam	Sakkubai	Telugu	Special appearance
2012	Yaare Koogadali	Herself	Kannada	Special appearance in song "Hello 123 Mike Testing"
2013	Sevakudu		Telugu	
2013	Naayak	Herself	Telugu	Special appearance
2013	Zila Ghaziabad	Suman	Hindi	
2013	Saradaga Ammayitho		Telugu	Cameo appearance
2013	Prema Oka Maikam	Mallika	Telugu	
2013	R... Rajkumar	Herself	Hindi	Special appearance in song "Gandi Baat"
2014	Pratighatana	Nischala	Telugu	
2015	Jyothi Lakshmi	Jyothi Lakshmi	Telugu	Also producer
2015	Mantra 2	Mantra	Telugu	
2015	10 Enradhukulla	Herself	Tamil	Cameo appearance

=== As producer ===
Year	Film	Language	Director	Notes
2015	Jyothi Lakshmi	Telugu	Puri Jagannadh	Co-producer
2017	Rogue	Kannada; Telugu	Puri Jagannadh	Co-producer
2017	Paisa Vasool	Telugu	Puri Jagannadh	Co-producer
2018	Mehbooba	Telugu	Puri Jagannadh	Co-producer
2019	ISmart Shankar	Telugu	Puri Jagannadh	Co-producer
2021	Romantic	Telugu	Anil Paduri	Co-producer
2022	Liger	Telugu; Hindi	Puri Jagannadh	Co-producer
2024	Double iSmart	Telugu	Puri Jagannadh	Co-producer

=== Voice Role ===
Year	Film	Actress	Role	Language	Notes
2007	Chandamama	Kajal Aggarwal	Mahalakshmi	Telugu	

== Awards ==
- 2005: Santosham Best Actress Award - Anukokunda Oka Roju
- 2007: Nandi Award for Best Actress - Mantra
