= Puri Jagannath =

Puri Jagannath may refer to:

- Jagannath Temple, Puri, a Hindu temple dedicated to the deity Jagannath in Puri, Odisha, India
- Puri Jagannadh (born 1966), Indian filmmaker, mainly in Telugu cinema
  - Puri Jagannadh Touring Talkies, an Indian film production company established by Puri Jagannadh
