= Purushothamudu =

2024 Indian film by Ram Bhimana

- Theatrical release poster
- Directed by: Ram Bhimana
- Written by: Ram Bhimana
- Produced by: Dr. Ramesh Tejawat; Prakash Tejawat
- Starring: Raj Tarun; Hassini Sudhir
- Cinematography: P. G. Vinda
- Edited by: Marthand K. Venkatesh
- Music by: Gopi Sundar
- Production company: Shree Sridevi Productions
- Distributed by: Mythri Movie Makers
- Release date: 26 July 2024
- Country: India
- Language: Telugu

Purushothamudu (transl. Ideal man) is a 2024 Indian Telugu-language action drama film written and directed by Ram Bhimana. The film features Raj Tarun and Hassini Sudhir in lead roles, while Prakash Raj, Ramya Krishna, Murali Sharma, Brahmanandam, and Mukesh Khanna play supporting roles. The music was composed by Gopi Sundar with cinematography by P. G. Vinda and editing by Marthand K. Venkatesh. Purushothamudu was released on 26 July 2024.

== Plot ==
Rachit Ram, the heir to the Hyderabad-based Parasuramaiah Group of Companies, returns to India after completing his education abroad. His grandfather, company founder Parasuramaiah, had established a condition in the family's bylaws requiring the prospective heir to live for 100 days as an ordinary person, without using the family's wealth, influence, or identity. Although his father Aditya Ram considers the condition responsible for the disappearance of his elder brother Raghu Ram, Rachit accepts the challenge.

Rachit's aunt Vasundhara Ram, who controls half of the company and wants her son Abhay to become CEO, attempts to sabotage him. Rachit leaves Hyderabad and settles in Rayapulanka, a village near Rajahmundry, where he works as an agricultural laborer and befriends Ammulu. Using his knowledge and ingenuity, he introduces inexpensive methods to improve irrigation and assists local farmers. Although initially reluctant to involve himself in their problems, he gradually becomes a trusted member of the community.

Rachit's efforts bring him into conflict with Balaraju, the violent son of the local MLA. After rescuing Ammulu from Balaraju's henchmen, Rachit learns about the farmers' broader problems. Balaraju's family has acquired much of the surrounding land and controls access to essential resources. Rachit encourages the villagers to collectively petition the government, eventually bringing their grievances to the attention of authorities in Delhi. His actions attract public attention, while Vasundhara and Abhay race to discover his whereabouts before he completes the 100-day challenge.

As the deadline approaches, Rachit's relationship with Ammulu is strained when she learns that he has concealed his true identity. Meanwhile, Balaraju's men attack the villagers and destroy their trees, while Abhay's henchmen attempt to kill Rachit. Rachit is severely wounded but manages to reach a government committee meeting and explain the farmers' grievances before collapsing. Impressed by his efforts, the committee abolishes the restrictive flower-marketing system in the village and allows the farmers to sell their produce freely.

At the company, the board initially declares that Rachit completed only 99 days because he was attacked on the final day. However, the board ultimately recognizes his commitment and declares that he has fulfilled the spirit of the challenge. Abhay objects, arguing that Rachit failed to complete the required 100 days. At this point, Raghu Ram unexpectedly returns after 20 years. He reveals that he had abandoned the challenge years earlier after realizing that wealth and influence were meaningless compared with helping people in need. During his years away, he experienced poverty and hunger and learned the importance of compassion and service. Raghu explains that Rachit similarly demonstrated that true leadership means putting people's welfare above personal responsibilities, even risking his life for those who trusted him. He also reveals that he found the wounded Rachit and helped him survive. Raghu reconciles with Aditya and Vasundhara and supports Rachit's succession. Vasundhara subsequently declares Rachit the rightful CEO, and the board unanimously appoints him to the position. Abhay accepts defeat and apologizes to his parents.

Rachit is revealed to have survived his injuries. He returns to the village and uses his wealth to help clear a farmer's debt and prevent his property from being auctioned. He also reconciles with Ammulu.

== Cast ==
- Raj Tarun as Rachit Ram
- Hassini Sudhir as Ammulu
- Prakash Raj as Raghu Ram, Rachit’s uncle and Aditya’s brother
- Ramya Krishna as Vasundhara, Raghu Ram’s wife and Rachit’s aunt
- Murali Sharma as Aditya Ram, Rachit's father and PR Group CEO
- Kausalya as Rachit’s mother
- Viran Muttamsetty as Abhay Ram, Raghu Ram and Vasundhara’s son
- Brahmanandam as Police Officer Appala Naidu
- Mukesh Khanna as Harsha Vardhan Khanna, Central Committee Chairman
- Brahmaji as Lawyer
- Satya as Rachit’s friend
- Praveen as Satti, Ammulu’s friend
- Raja Ravindra as Police CI
- Kavitha as Abhi’s aunt
- Raj Tirandasu as Balaraju
- Jwala koti as MLA
- Ananth Babu as Subrahmanyam, Aditya Ram’s PA
- C. V. L. Narasimha Rao as PR Group director
- Sameer as Vardhan
- Kancharapalem Raju as Villager
- Racha Ravi as Nathi Ravi
- Laxman Meesala as Villager

== Music ==
Purushothamudu

Soundtrack album by Gopi Sundar
- Released: 2024
- Recorded: 2024
- Language: Telugu
- Label: Junglee Music
- Producer: Gopi Sundar

The film's soundtrack album and background score were composed by Gopi Sundar.

All music is composed by Gopi Sundar.

Track list
No.	Title	Lyrics	Singer(s)	Length
1.	"Pacha Pachani"	Purnachary	S. P. Charan
2.	"Bhallantu"	Balaji	Kailash Kher
3.	"Ila Ila"	Chandrabose	Karthik, Ayyan Pranathi
4.	"Hey Purushottama"	Ramajogayya Sastry	Ranjani, Gayatri
5.	"Manasey Vellipothey"	Chaitanya Prasad	Gopi Sundar, Ramya Behara
6.	"Yuddham Nadipina"	Balaji	Shankar Mahadevan

== Release and reception ==
Purushothamudu was released on 26 July 2024.

The Times of India gave a rating of 3 out of 5 saying, "Purushothamudu is a well-crafted film that, despite its conventional storyline, offers an entertaining experience, but only if you can overlook the clichéd commercial elements". Times Now gave a mixed review saying, "Despite its conventional plot, Purushothamudu offers a good experience", while praising the performances of the lead cast. Praising the technical values and performances of Raj Tarun, Ramya Krishna, Prakash Raj, Murali Sharma, and Brahmanandam, The Hans India wrote that "Purushothamudu is a commendable film that combines drama, comedy, and action".
