= Rogue (2017 film) =

Indian action thriller film

- movie poster
- Directed by: Puri Jagannadh
- Written by: Puri Jagannadh
- Produced by: C. R. Manohar; C. R. Gopi
- Starring: Ishan; Mannara Chopra; Angela Krislinzki
- Cinematography: Mukesh Gnanesh
- Edited by: Junaid Siddiqui
- Music by: Sunil Kashyap
- Production company: Tanvi Films
- Distributed by: Jaya Aditya (Telugu); Jayanna Films (Kannada)
- Release date: 31 March 2017
- Running time: 134 minutes
- Country: India
- Languages: Telugu; Kannada

Rogue is a 2017 Indian action drama film directed by Puri Jagannadh and produced by C. R. Manohar and C. R. Gopi under Tanvi Films. The film was shot simultaneously in Telugu and Kannada languages and stars Ishan, Mannara Chopra, Angela Krislinzki and Thakur Anoop Singh.

Filming began in November 2015 and the first trailer was out on 1 March 2017.

Ishan won SIIMA Award for Best Male Debut (Telugu) at 7th South Indian International Movie Awards.

== Synopsis ==
Sanju/Chanti (Ishan) is a reckless youth who hates women after being cheated by his girlfriend Anjali (Angela Krislinzki). Sanju gets into a tussle with a constable named Murali (Satyadev) and breaks his legs. Seeing Murali's family condition, Sanju decides to help the family and works as an auto driver and a recovery agent. Things work fine for Murali and his family until an escaped gangster named Psycho (Thakur Anoop Singh) targets Murali's sister Anjali (Mannara Chopra) due to a past. Can Sanju protects Anjali from Psycho and his gang forms the rest of the story.

== Cast ==
- Ishan as Sanju/Chanti
- Mannara Chopra as Anjali
- Angela Krislinzki as Anjali
- Thakur Anoop Singh as Psycho
- Ajaz Khan as Ajaz
- Avinash as Sanju's father
- Satyadev as Constable Murali, Anjali's brother
- Ali (Telugu version)
- Sadhu Kokila (Kannada version)
- Thulasi Shivamani as Sanju's mother
- Subbaraju as an encounter specialist
- Chirag Jani as Chirag
- Posani Krishna Murali as Seth

== Production ==
After the completion of Loafer in 2015, Puri Jagannadh announced that he would start his new project titled Rogue which would be a sequel of Pokiri and had approached actor Mahesh Babu for the lead role. Since there were no confirmation from the actor's side, Puri hinted about directing Chiranjeevi's 150th film and narrated the story. Chiranjeevi was not impressed with the second half of the film and instead preferred a remake of Kaththi. Puri went ahead with a fresh concept and cast producer C. R. Manohar's cousin Ishaan in the lead role. On 5 October 2015, Puri announced on his Twitter that he would introduce a new face for his upcoming film titled Rogue. Initially Aisha Sharma and Pooja Jhaveri were signed on for the lead female roles. The shoot began and suddenly was shelved due to various reasons. Later, Puri revived the project by replacing Jhaveri with Angela Krislinzki who had earlier appeared in a song of the film Jyothi Lakshmi to play the lead role along with Mannara Chopra in the parallel lead role.

== Music ==
Rogue

Soundtrack album by Sunil Kashyap
- Released: 9 March 2017
- Recorded: 2016
- Genre: Feature film soundtrack
- Language: Telugu; Kannada
- Label: Aditya Music
- Producer: Sunil Kashyap

The official soundtrack of the film consisting of six songs was composed by Sunil Kashyap. While the Kannada version of the audio is about to be launched on 9 March 2017 at Bangalore Palace in Bengaluru and invited actors Shiva Rajkumar, Sudeep and Puneeth Rajkumar to be at the event. The Telugu version is planned to release in the second week of March with actor Nandamuri Balakrishna and Sunny Leone being the primary invitees.

Telugu Track list
No.	Title	Lyrics	Artist(s)	Length
1.	"Ghumshuda"	Bhaskara Bhatla	Chinmayi
2.	"Nee Kosam"	Bhaskara Bhatla	Shreya Ghoshal
3.	"Ee Pranam"	Bhaskara Bhatla	Sunil Kashyap
4.	"Toli Pravasame"	Bhaskara Bhatla	Malvika Sriram
5.	"Neela Neela"	Bhaskara Bhatla	Sunil Kashyap
6.	"Adadhante"	Bhaskara Bhatla	Hemachandra

Kannada Track list
No.	Title	Lyrics	Artist(s)	Length
1.	"Ghumshuda"	Ram	Chinmayi
2.	"Ninagagi Naa Kadiruve"	V. Nagendra Prasad	Shreya Ghoshal
3.	"Ee Sarasa"	V. Nagendra Prasad	Yazin Nizar
4.	"Savi Anubhavavo"	V. Nagendra Prasad	Pranavi, Malavika
5.	"Neeli Neeli"	V. Nagendra Prasad	Sunil Kashyap
6.	"Hennu Andre Abala Alla"	V. Nagendra Prasad	Hemachandra

== Release ==
The film was released on 31 March 2017.

== Reception ==
=== Critical response ===
Mukta Badipatla of The Times of India gave 3.5/5 stars and wrote "A predictable storyline embellished with hilarious dialogues and fine performance, Rogue proves to be an out-an-out entertaining action drama." Hemanth Kumar of Firstpost gave 2/5 and wrote "Rogue reiterates the notion that the Puri Jagannadh we once knew has gone on a long vacation."
