= Neeke Manasichaanu =

- DVD cover
- Directed by: Surya Teja
- Written by: Chintapally Ramana (dialogues)
- Story by: Ram Prasad
- Produced by: M.S. Kumar; Koduri Rammurthy
- Starring: Srikanth; Charmi
- Cinematography: Jayaram
- Edited by: Marthand K. Venkatesh
- Music by: Sri
- Production company: GSK Arts
- Release date: 12 December 2003
- Country: India
- Language: Telugu

Neeke Manasichaanu (transl. I've given my heart to you alone) is a 2003 Indian Telugu-language romantic drama film directed by Surya Teja. It stars Srikanth and Charmi.

== Cast ==
- Srikanth as Vivek
- Charmy Kaur as Sridevi
- Anvita as Priya
- Paruchuri Venkateswara Rao as Venkatachalam
- Chandra Mohan as Chandram
- Giri Babu as Rama Chandra Murthy
- Geetha as Vasundhara Varma, Vivek's mother
- Sudha as Bhuvana, Sridevi's mother
- Sarath Babu as Panduranga Rao, Vivek's father
- Jayanti as Janaki, Sridevi's grandmother
- Kaikala Satyanarayana as Raghavaiah, Sridevi's grandfather
- L. B. Sriram as Pandu, Sridevi's father
- Brahmanandam as The man obsessed with Namaskaram
- Ali as Savitri
- Sunil as Sattibabu
- Sivaji Raja as Gangaraju
- Gundu Hanumantha Rao as Priest
- Venu Madhav as Kondababu
- Satyam Rajesh as Parking Attendant
- M. S. Narayana as Vaddi Narayana
- Prabhu as Prabhu

== Production ==
The film's director, Surya Teja, worked as an assistant under K. Raghavendra Rao in Pelli Sandadi, before directing this film. In June 2003, shooting took place in a house in Shamshabad.

== Soundtrack ==
The music is composed by Sri, who composes after a four-year break. The lyrics are written by Sirivennela Seetharama Sastry (except where noted). The song "Mehbooba Mehbooba" is based on the song Dil ding-dong ding dole. The audio rights are owned by Supreme Music.

- "Tholichoope Edo Chitram Chesinda"
- "Andi Andaka"
- "Aakupachchani Siri"
- "Maaghamasam Manchi Muhurtam Kudirinde Enchakka"
- "Mehbooba Mehbooba" (lyrics by Bhuvana Chandra)

== Reception ==
A critic from Sify opined that "Director Surya Teja has done a neat job with Neeke Manasichaanu. The movie is hilarious with a routine story and is presented well". Gudipoodi Srihari of The Hindu wrote that "A BIT away from the usual comedy mode of films in which Srikanth plays lead, this film presents serious drama and leaves comedy for branded comedians". Jeevi of Idlebrain stated that "It's not a bad film and you may watch it once for the comedy". Mithun Verma of Full Hyderabad was not impressed, writing: "The concept of the movie is pretty good, but the execution makes you wonder which planet the filmmakers hail from".
