= Heart Attack (2014 film) =

2014 Telugu-language romantic action thriller

- Movie Poster
- Directed by: Puri Jagannadh
- Written by: Puri Jagannadh
- Produced by: Puri Jagannadh
- Starring: Nithiin; Adah Sharma; Vikramjeet Virk
- Cinematography: Amol Rathod
- Edited by: M. S. Rajashekhar Reddy (S. R. Shekhar)
- Music by: Anup Rubens
- Production company: Puri Jagannadh Touring Talkies
- Distributed by: Vaishno Academy
- Release date: 31 January 2014
- Running time: 140 min
- Country: India
- Language: Telugu
- Budget: ₹25 crore
- Box office: est. ₹40 crore

Heart Attack is 2014 Indian Telugu-language romantic action comedy film written, directed and produced by Puri Jagannadh under Puri Jagannadh Touring Talkies. The film stars Nithiin and Adah Sharma, with Nicole Amy Madell in an extended cameo appearance and Vikramjeet Virk as the antagonist. Anoop Rubens composed the soundtrack for the film, while the cinematography and editing were handled by Amol Rathod and S. R. Shekhar.

Heart Attack was released on 31 January 2014 worldwide and received mixed-to-positive reviews from critics, and became commercially successful at the box office.

== Plot ==
Makrand Kamati is the leader of a slave trade and drug racket in Goa. Inspector Madhusudhan bust down Makrand's activities, but he is attacked by Makarand, who injures Madhusudhan and turn him into an immobile person.

Meanwhile, Varun, a hippie vagabond, wanders all over the world. Varun lost his parents in his childhood when he was in USA. Varun, who calls himself a free soul, never believes in relationships and earns his living by working in part-time jobs in Craigslist, a classified advertising website, and rests at nights on the roads with some kitchen equipment to cook food.

Varun arrives in Spain, where he comes across Hayathi, an Indian girl who arrived to Spain to meet her friend Priya. In order to capture her attention, Varun pretends to suffer with a heart attack and later takes her phone number, but doesn't learn her name. Hayathi arrives at Spain to convince Priya's father ISKCON Ramana, a staunch Krishna devotee who hates love marriages, to accept her relationship with Haridas, an African musician. After much chasing and teasing, Varun asks Hayathi to give him a kiss, but she slaps him. Varun places a bet that if he makes Ramana accept the marriage of the lovers, Hayathi should kiss him. Varun wins the challenge and Hayathi has to kiss him as per the bet.

On a separate note, Varun exposes Makarand's drug racket and thrashes Makarand's men Ammu and others at the arena. After this, Varun and Hayathi kiss for an hour, but the kiss had a condition from Hayathi. When Varun asks for the condition, Hayathi tells that Varun should never meet her as she is heartbroken since she was madly in love with Varun, but he has no belief in relationships. Varun leaves for Romania, where he meets a girl Chitrangada, who has a similar mindset. After spending time with Chitrangada, Varun realizes that he is indeed in love with Hayathi. After getting a strong moral support from Chitrangada, Varun desperately goes to Priya's house and finds a slip in which it is written that Hayathi is in Goa.

Varun reaches Goa and tracks down Hayathi with the help of a Rajinikanth. Varun meets Hayati, but he faces a strong rejection from her. Varun desperately tries to speak with her, but Makarand, Ammu and his men arrive and intervene, telling that Hayathi is Makarand's would-be wife. It is revealed that Hayati is Madhusudhan's daughter, and in order to meet the expenses of her father's medication, Hayathi accepts to marry Makarand, without knowing the fact that Makarand was behind her father's hospitalization. Varun kills Ammu and learns about the problem, where he slaps Hayathi for hiding the reason to part with him. Hayathi replies that her problems would ruin Varun's happiness as Varun is a free soul.

Varun needs ₹20 lakh for Madhusudhan's operation, where he meets Prakash Raj, a business magnate. Prakash Raj offers ₹2 crore and asks him to save his daughter, who is kidnapped by Makarand. Varun enters Makarand's den and learns that Hayathi is also going to be a part of Makarand's trade and she is alreading injected with opium. Varun kills Makarand by slitting his throat with a blade. Madhusudhan recovers from his injuries and Prakash Raj reunites with his daughter. Varun and Hayathi get married and leave for their honeymoon after receiving flight tickets and money from Prakash Raj.

== Cast ==
- Nithiin as Varun
- Adah Sharma as Hayati
- Vikramjeet Virk as Makarand Kamati
- Nicole Amy Madell as Chitrangada
- Ali as Rajnikanth's fan
- Brahmanandam as Ramana, Priya and Shriya's father
- Kesha Khambhati as Priya
- Tejaswi Madivada as Shriya, Priya's sister
- Ajay as Ammu, Makarand's Henchman
- Devan as Madhusudhan, Hayati's father
- Pavitra Lokesh as Hayati's Mother
- Ajaz Khan as Makrand's Henchman
- Prakash Raj as himself in a cameo appearance
- Khushi Mukherjee as Rajnikanth's fan's girlfriend

== Production ==
Nithiin grew his hair longer for the film.

== Soundtrack ==
Heart Attack

Soundtrack album by Anup Rubens
- Released: 9 January 2014
- Recorded: 2013
- Genre: Feature film soundtrack
- Length: 23:39
- Language: Telugu
- Label: Puri Sangeet
- Producer: Anup Rubens

Anup Rubens chronology
Bhimavaram Bullodu (2014)	Heart Attack (2014)	Autonagar Surya (2014)

The soundtrack was composed by Anup Rubens. The audio CDs were released into the market through Puri Sangeet. The audio launch of the film was held in Bangkok on 9 January 2014.

All lyrics are written by Bhaskarabhatla Ravi Kumar.

Track listing
No.	Title	Artist(s)	Length
1.	"Nuvvante Naaku"	Jassie Gift	03:45
2.	"Thuhi Hai Thuhi"	Anup Rubens, Smitha Belluri	03:54
3.	"Ra Ra Vasthava"	Chaitra Ambadipudi, Santosh	03:42
4.	"Selavanuko"	Chaitra Ambadipudi	03:45
5.	"That's All Right Mam"	Anup Rubens, Tippu	04:09
6.	"Chupinchandey"	Rahul Nambiar	04:21
7.	"Endhukila Nannu Vedhisthunavey"	Kunal Ganjawala	04:02
Total length:			27:42

== Reception ==
The Times of India gave 3/5 stars and wrote "The cinematography and music is what makes it seem much better than it really is. The visuals are breathtakingly beautiful. ... you'll be fine as long as you don't try to make sense of it all." Sridhar Vivan of Bangalore Mirror wrote "If you are watching this film, then you can be sure of not getting a heart attack though you may be at the risk of having a headache. We really wonder if it's the same Puri Jagannadh who came up with a film like Heart Attack. Leave the story, there is hardly any comedy despite Ali trying his routine comedy strip, the even punch dialogues seem to have gone for a toss."

Oneindia Entertainment gave 3/5 stars and wrote "Puri Jagannadh has opted for a routine romance drama, but he has written an engaging screenplay for Heart Attack, which has fare amount of twists and turns to keep you glued on to the screen. The director, who is master in making formulaic movies, managed to include commercial ingredients like romance, action, comedy, dialogues and family drama, which will definitely impress all classes of audience." IndiaGlitz wrote "Heart Attack hit the screens as a favorite this season. The film doesn't disappoint and lives up to the expectations. An entertaining youthful romantic-comedy with loads of action."
