= Mantra (2007 film) =

2007 film by Osho Tulasi Ram

- DVD cover
- Directed by: Osho Tulasi Ram
- Written by: Story & Screenplay: Ravi Prakash; Dialogues: Surendra Krishna
- Produced by: Kalyan Ram Ch. Ravi Prakash B.
- Starring: Charmy; Sivaji
- Cinematography: Dasaradhi Sivendra
- Edited by: Upendra
- Music by: Anand
- Production company: Gen Next Movies
- Release date: 14 December 2007
- Country: India
- Language: Telugu

Mantra is a 2007 Indian Telugu-language mystery thriller film directed by debutant Osho Tulasi Ram and produced by Ravi Prakash. The film stars Charmy in the title role alongside Sivaji, with a supporting cast including Kausha Rach, Karuna Sri, Chitram Srinu, and Jeeva. The plot revolves around Mantra, a young woman who inherits a haunted property called Mantra Nilayam, and her efforts to uncover the house's dark secrets.

The film was released on 14 December 2007 to positive reviews, with critics praising its narrative and Charmy's performance. Produced on a modest budget, it became a commercial success. The film also won the Nandi Award for Best Audiographer. Following the film's success, the director and lead actress collaborated again on another thriller, Mangala (2011). Mantra 2 (2015), which was promoted as a sequel, shares no connection with the original cast or crew.

== Plot ==
Mantra loses her parents at a young age and lives with her friend Vinny. She inherits an ancestral property called Mantra Nilayam, located on the outskirts of Hyderabad. The property has gained notoriety as a haunted house following two mysterious deaths that occurred there years earlier. Unable to find a buyer due to its ominous reputation, Mantra struggles to sell the house.

A prospective buyer, a professor, agrees to purchase the property on the condition that someone lives there for three months. Mantra decides to stay in the house with her friend, but they are soon frightened by the presence of an evil spirit and vacate the premises.

Meanwhile, Hero, a small-time enforcer specializing in land settlements, approaches Mantra and agrees to stay in the house for the three-month duration, motivated by the promise of a commission once the sale is finalised. He moves in with three of his friends. However, one of them, Muniswamy, is mysteriously killed, prompting Hero to investigate the eerie legends surrounding Mantra Nilayam. The plot delves deeper into the house's secrets, its dark past, and Mantra's connection to the tragic events.

== Cast ==
- Charmy as Mantra (voice dubbed by Sunitha)
- Sivaji as Hero
- Kausha Rach
- Karuna Sri as Vinny
- Chitram Srinu as Muniswamy
- Jeeva
- Mallikarjuna Rao
- Rallapalli
- Karuna Bhushan
- Vijay Sai
- Noel Sean (special appearance in "Maha Maha")

== Production ==
The production of Mantra began with a launch ceremony at Annapurna Studios on 27 October 2006. During the event, Devi Sri Prasad sounded the clapboard, Dil Raju and Sukumar switched on the camera, and Puri Jagannadh directed the first shot.

Producer Ravi Prakash made his debut in filmmaking, transitioning from a software background. Director Tulasi Ram previously worked under director Siva Nageswara Rao. Surendra Krishna, who had previously written dialogues for A Film by Aravind (2005), wrote the dialogues for Mantra.

The songs were choreographed by Prem Rakshith.

== Music ==
Music for Mantra was composed by Anand. The song "Maha Maha" is based on Black Eyed Peas' "My Humps".

The music of Mantra was launched at a function held at Prasad Labs in Hyderabad on the night of 4 November 2007. The event featured M. M. Keeravani and S. S. Rajamouli as chief guests. Vel Records acquired the music rights for the film.

Track listing
No.	Title	Lyrics	Singer(s)	Length
1.	"Maha Maha"	Bhuvana Chandra	Srimathumitha, Swapna Madhuri, Noel Sean	3:53
2.	"Oohallonaa"	Anand	Suchitra, Nani	5:06
3.	"Mantra (Theme)"	—	—	3:18
4.	"Reena Reena"	Anand, Noel Sean	Anand, Karthik	3:42
5.	"Dole Dil Dole"	Noel Sean	Geetha Madhuri	4:58
6.	"Remix Maha"	Bhuvana Chandra	Harshika, DJ Shawn	3:33
Total length:				24:30

== Release and reception ==
Mantra was released on 14 December 2007. Vijayanand Movies acquired the overseas theatrical rights, while Bhavani Media secured the DVD rights for the film.

=== Critical response ===
Jeevi of Idlebrain.com rated the film 3/5, praising its suspenseful storytelling and its ability to effectively scare the audience. He remarked, "If the motive of any horror film is to scare you, this film succeeds in that aspect."

=== Box office ===
In a year-end box office report, Telugucinema.com noted that Mantra, made on a modest budget, emerged as a profitable venture. The report highlighted Charmme's popularity among male youth as a significant factor in the film's success.

== Awards ==
- Nandi Award for Best Audiographer - Radha Krishna (2007)
