= Mungaru Male 2 =

2016 film by Shashank

- Theatrical poster
- Directed by: Shashank
- Screenplay by: Shashank; Gopi Iyengar; Raghu Kovi
- Story by: Shashank
- Produced by: G Gangadhar
- Starring: Ganesh; Neha Shetty; V. Ravichandran
- Cinematography: Shekar Chandra
- Edited by: K. M. Prakash
- Music by: Arjun Janya
- Production company: E. K. Pictures
- Release date: 10 September 2016
- Running time: 160 minutes
- Country: India
- Language: Kannada

Mungaru Male 2 (transl. Pre-monsoon showers 2) is a 2016 Indian Kannada-language romantic drama film directed by Shashank. It stars Ganesh, Neha Shetty and Ravichandran with Shilpa Manjunath, Aindrita Ray, P. Ravi Shankar and Sadhu Kokila in supporting roles. Despite the title, the film is not a sequel to 2006 film Mungaru Male and is a namesake sequel.

== Cast ==
- Ganesh as Preetham
- Neha Shetty as Nandini
- Ravichandran as Preetham's father
- Shilpa Manjunath as Aishwarya "Aishu"
- Aindrita Ray as Shreya
- P. Ravi Shankar as Nandini's father
- Sadhu Kokila as Nandini's uncle
- Tabla Nani
- Shraddha Srinath as a doctor (cameo appearance)

== Production ==
=== Development ===
After the commercial success of the 2006 film Mungaru Male, which grossed ₹750 million, the makers conceived a second part for the film, which they had previously planned while shooting for the film was on course. With producer E. Krishnappa objecting to the title Mungaru Male Part 2, the title Preetham Prem Kahani was fixed. Ganesh was to reprise his role as Preetham opposite Ramya. In September, The Times of India reported that Rockline Venkatesh would produce the film titled Mungaru Male 2, and that it would be directed by Preetham Gubbi, the screenwriter of Mungaru Male. It was reported that Ganesh would reprise his role and the makers were on the lookout for the female lead. The sequel, however, did not take off for seven years until reports came out in early July 2014, when it was announced, albeit by a different film team. It was reported that G. Gangadhar, the executive producer of Mungaru Male, would produce it. He approached Shashank to direct it, who initially refused, but was keen on directing Ganesh. However, after much insistence, reports said Shashank relented and began working on the film's story and screenplay, which he completed by March 2015. It was revealed that Ganesh would reprise his role in the film as the main protagonist, and that the film would be titled Mungaru Male 2.

=== Casting ===
V. Ravichandran was the second actor to be signed by the makers of the film, in May 2015, though at the time of the announcement, his role in the film was not made clear. However, it was speculated that he would play Ganesh's father. The director Shashank said the search for a "new face" as a female lead began with the announcement of the film. He spotted the photos of a Mangalore-based model Neha Shetty, in the newspapers in February 2015, as reports came out of her winning beauty contest WTN Miss Mangalore, who on being placed at the Miss India South emerged as a runner-up. Keen on having her in the film, he approached her, who, then a student of pre-university course was busy with her examinations. She was eventually signed in July 2015 as the female lead opposite Ganesh. It was also revealed that P. Ravi Shankar and Sadhu Kokila would play supporting roles. Arjun Janya was signed by the makers to score the film's background music and compose six tracks as part of its soundtrack.

=== Filming ===
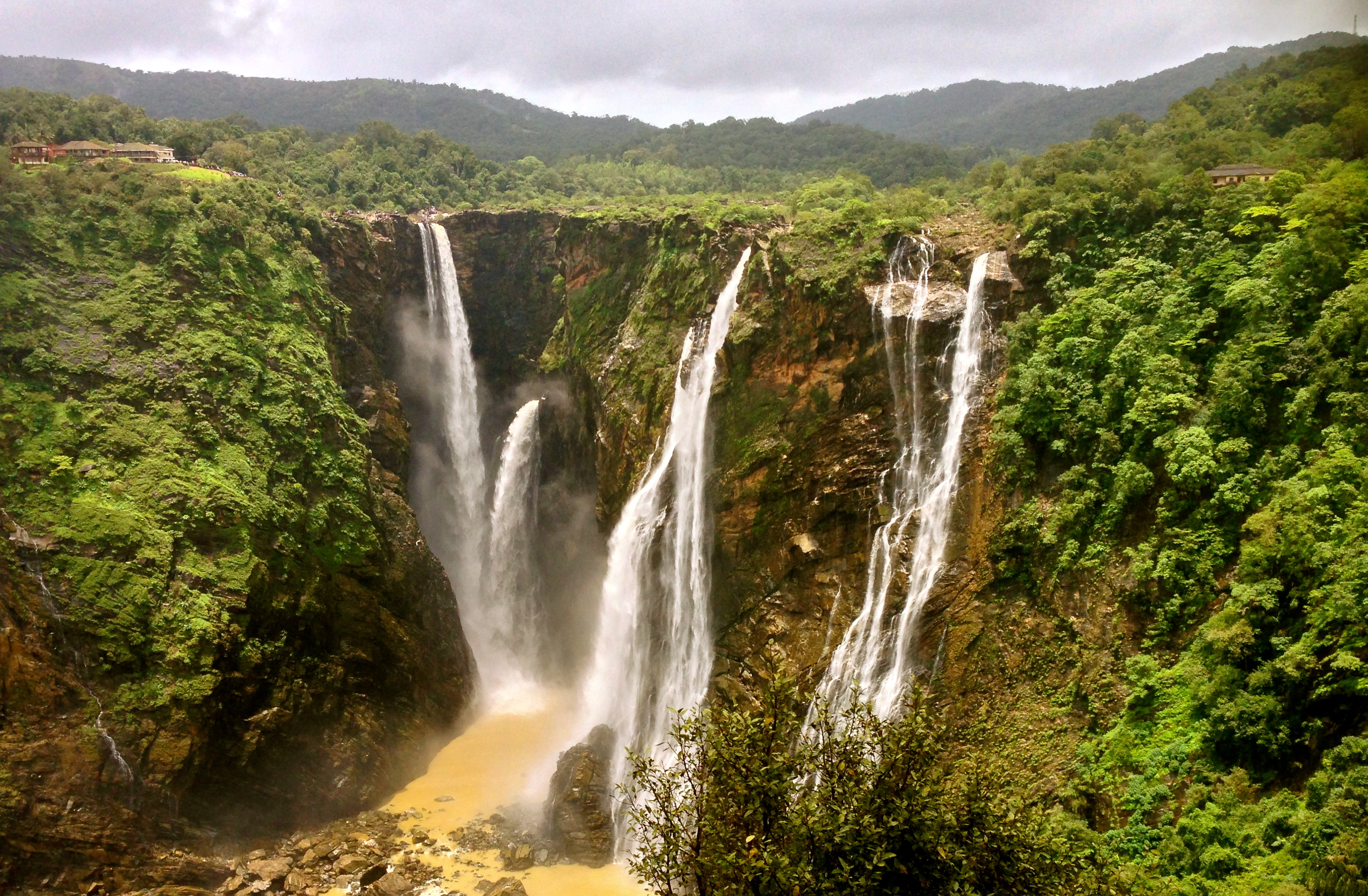
Jog Falls in Sagara, Karnataka, where a few sequences of the film were shot.

At the time of announcement of the film in November 2014, it was reported that the film, unlike its prequel would be filmed over two seasons, the summer and monsoon. The director Shashank said, "[Filming] will go on for five months during the scorching heat of summer as well as during the heavy rains." To coincide with the date of commencing of filming and theatrical release of Mungaru Male, the makers planned on having them on the same dates – 28 July and 26 December 2015 respectively. As scheduled, filming began on 26 July. Major part of the first schedule was filmed in the Malnad region of Karnataka and was completed in late August. Around this time, it was revealed that Ravichandran would play the role of Ganesh's father in the film. The second schedule began in mid-September. Filming took place in areas surrounding Jog Falls, in the Sagara region of Karnataka. Speaking to The Times of India, Shashank said, "[W]e are capturing a very important sequence at the waterfalls, which will include a major fight sequence. We are also shooting some romantic scenes in the surrounding locations, which are unexplored in Sandalwood." In February 2016, it was reported that most of the filming was complete except the songs. Also reportedly, Ganesh would fly to Slovenia along with Aindrita Ray to shoot for a song together.

== Soundtrack ==
Mungaru Male 2

Soundtrack album by Arjun Janya
- Released: 5 August 2016
- Recorded: 2016
- Genre: Feature film soundtrack
- Label: Jhankar Music
- Producer: Arjun Janya

Arjun Janya scored the soundtrack and score for the film. A total of six songs and one instrumental track were composed by him and written by the lyricists such as Jayanth Kaikini, Kaviraj, Chandan Shetty, Gopi Iyengar and the director Shashank. Noted singers such as Sonu Nigam and Shreya Ghoshal who got their big breaks in Kannada cinema through Mungaru Male recorded their voices to the sequel as well. Bollywood singer Armaan Malik recorded his breakthrough Kannada song and so did the Rajasthani folk singer Swaroop Khan. The music for the film was one of the highly anticipated album since its prequel was a musical blockbuster which was composed by Mano Murthy.

The audio was officially released on 5 August 2016 through Jhankar Music label.

Track listing
No.	Title	Lyrics	Singer(s)	Length
1.	"Sariyaagi"	Jayanth Kaikini	Armaan Malik	4:22
2.	"Neenu Iradhe"	Kaviraj	Armaan Malik, Anuradha Bhat	4:54
3.	"Onte Songu"	Gopi Iyengar; Dr. Umesh Pilikudelu	Armaan Malik, Swaroop Khan, Shreya Ghoshal	4:46
4.	"My Daddy"	Chandan Shetty	Benny Dayal, Chandan Shetty	4:12
5.	"Gamanisu"	Jayanth Kaikini	Sonu Nigam	4:47
6.	"Kanasalu"	Shashank	Shreya Ghoshal	4:38
7.	"Trap Song"	Instrumental		2:30
8.	"Mungaru Male 2 Mashup"	Various	Various	5:15
Total length:				35:24

== Release ==
The first teaser of the film was released on 5 June 2016 on YouTube. The 107-second video introduces the characters in the film, and actors Upendra, Shiva Rajkumar, Puneeth Rajkumar, Yash and Sudeep feature in it asking questions about the film. An audio teaser was released on 30 July, which was the first of its kind in Kannada film industry. The audio was released on 5 August.

The film found its theatrical release worldwide on 9 September 2016, while in Karnataka, the release was pushed to 10 September 2016 because of the Cauvery water dispute.

== Reception ==
=== Critical response ===
A critic from Deccan Herald wrote that "Mungaru Male 2 is vacuous and insufferable as can be. Even Shekar Chandra’s fluid camerawork fails to salvage Male 2. It is best to revisit Bhat’s 2006 original to relive the musical romance of yesteryear". A critic from Bangalore Mirror wrote that "Unfortunately, a sequel creates great expectations and 2006’s Mungaru Male was a tough act to follow. Shashank’s attempt is forced and he seems to have fallen for the routine traps under the weight of those expectations". A critic from Deccan Chronicle wrote that "The first half reminds of several Bollywood movies and it never takes off. When it actually starts to rain, the excitement is already over. A couple of scenes are brilliantly shot, and the rest looks ordinary".

On the contrary, a critic from The Times of India rated the film 3 1/2 out of 5 and wrote that "Shashank's films are known for masala entertainment and that one finds aplenty here. The film does not disappoint fans who watched the first part, for there is a Preetham, a Nandini and even a wedding house in hilly Karnataka, but all served in a different presentation with new spices. This film is for those who love the trademark romantic capers".

== External sources ==
- Mungaru Male 2 at IMDb
