= Kancharapalem Raju =

Indian actor

- Born: Vepada Subba Rao; Visakhapatnam, Andhra Pradesh, India
- Occupation: Actor
- Years active: 2018–present

Vepada Subba Rao, better known as Kancharapalem Raju, is an Indian actor who works in Telugu-language films. He received wide popularity for the character "Raju" in his debut film C/o Kancharapalem (2018).

== Early life and career ==
Subba Rao used to act in dramas. He worked at GVMC. During the casting period of C/o Kancharapalem, director Venkatesh Maha gave him a chance to act in the film. The film brought him wide acclaim and since then he continued acting in the films. He won a jury award for his work in the film C/o Kancharapalem at the Caleidoscope Indian Film Festival.

== Filmography ==
†	Denotes films that have not yet been released

Year	Title	Role	Notes
2018	C/o Kancharapalem	Raju	Debut film
2020	Palasa 1978	Satya Narayana	
2020	Colour Photo	Jayakrishna's father	
2020	Bucchi Naidu Kandriga	Narayana	
2021	Akshara	RMP Doctor	
2021	Uppena		
2021	Vakeel Saab		
2021	Kanabadutaledu	Mavayya	
2021	Tuck Jagadish	Attender Simhachalam	
2021	Gamanam	Cricket Coach	
2022	Ammu	Ismail	
2022	Chor Bazaar	Simran's father	
2022	Kerosene: A Burnt Truth	Ramaswamy	
2022	HIT: The Second Case	Raghavudu’s father	
2022	18 Pages	Nandini’s grandfather	
2024	Purushothamudu	Villager	
2024	Zebra		
2024	Laggam	Seenu	
2025	Nidurinchu Jahapana		
2026	Nilakanta		
