= Dhoni (film) =

2012 film by Prakash Raj

- Release poster in Tamil
- Directed by: Prakash Raj
- Screenplay by: Prakash Raj; T. J. Gnanavel
- Story by: Mahesh Manjrekar
- Based on: Shikshanachya Aaicha Gho
- Produced by: Prakash Raj
- Starring: Prakash Raj; Akash; Radhika Apte
- Cinematography: K. V. Guhan
- Edited by: Kishore Te
- Music by: Ilaiyaraaja
- Production company: Duet Movies
- Release date: 10 February 2012
- Country: India
- Languages: Tamil; Telugu

Dhoni is a 2012 Indian children's drama film directed, produced and co-written by Prakash Raj. Simultaneously made in Tamil and Telugu languages, the film stars Raj alongside Akash and Radhika Apte. A remake of the Marathi film Shikshanachya Aaicha Gho (2010), it illustrates the conflicting interests of a father and his son; the father wants his son to study MBA, but his son is more interested in sports and wants to become a famous cricketer like MS Dhoni. Dhoni was released on 10 February 2012. The film won the Tamil Nadu State Film Award for Third Best Film.

== Plot ==
Subramaniam (Prakash Raj) is a lower-middle-class widower raising his two kids, Kaveri and Karthik. He works tirelessly in a government job and making traditional Indian pickles on the side to make ends meet. He wishes to give his children an education in a good school and dreams of seeing Karthik become an MBA graduate. However, Karthik has no interest in studying. His passion is cricket and he aspires to become a great cricketer like his idol, MS Dhoni. The clash of dreams creates growing tension between the father and son where Karthik's poor academic performance frustrates both his father and teachers, while his talent in cricket goes largely unrecognised which Karthik’s coach (Nassar) recognizes as a talent and often praises Karthik. The principal warns Subramaniam that Karthik has a last chance to improve his grades otherwise he will repeat the same year or be dismissed from the school.

Living nearby to Subramaniam is Nalini (Radhika Apte) who Kaveri often spends time with, but one day Subramaniam discovers that Nalini earns her living through prostitution and forbids Kaveri from associating with her, seeing Nalini as a bad influence.

Determined to guide Karthik towards a better future, Subramaniam makes a firm decision to stop Karthik from attending cricket coaching practice, and enrolls him in tuitions insisting him to solely focus on improving his grades. Karthik's cricket coach convinces Subramaniam that forcing Karthik to pursue something he does not wish to study is considered pressuring and even convinces Subramaniam how Karthik is strongly passionate toward cricket and that how Karthik's coach is impressed with Karthik's talent in cricket and has potential in being a great cricketer. The change however proves to be a difficult one for Karthik, who struggles to cope with the pressure of studying. Subramaniam reaches a breaking point and loses his patience with his son's continued refusal to take his studies seriously. Subramaniam breaks Karthik's cricket bat before beating him, and in a moment of rage he pushes Karthik aside causing him to hit his head against a table and fall to the ground bleeding. Karthik falls into a coma, and a devastated Subramaniam is consumed by guilt over his actions and gets arrested shortly after.

During this wretched time, Nalini steps forward to help Subramaniam with bailing him out and Karthik's hospital bills, which changes Subramaniam's perception of her and comes to understand that a person's character cannot be judged by their circumstances alone. Subramaniam is then summoned to Karthik's school by the principal, who requests Subramaniam to withdraw his son from the school. With little choice left, Subramaniam signs the necessary forms and collects Karthik's belongings from his locker. Subramaniam finds several trophies and certificates that Karthik was awarded which makes him realize how talented Karthik is in cricket, and then goes to argue with the history teacher that his son's poor grades do not define his worth.

Inspired, Subramaniam appears on a television show and debates about the pressures placed on children by the education system. His debate captures the attention of a foreign doctor and his wife, who are deeply moved by Subramaniam's words and seek him out. They confide that they understand Subramaniam's struggle all too well having once pushed their son who had an interest in music to carry on the family's medical legacy, a path that drove him into drug addiction, and wanting to make amends with their past, the doctor offers to help perform Karthik's operation. However, his outspokenness of the system also has consequences like getting beaten up by goons, getting fired from his government job, and a loan for his son's operation gets cancelled.

Desperate, Subramaniam attends a public function while bringing Karthik along in a wheelchair to meet the Chief Minister (Sarath Babu) and to raise his concerns about how the system is unfair. The Chief Minister promises reforms to the system and ensures the loan will be approved for Karthik's operation. Karthik's operation is successfully completed.

In the climax, Karthik plays in the final cricket tournament hitting the last ball for a six to win the match, and is carried off the field in celebration by his cricket coach and a proud Subramaniam.

== Cast ==
- Prakash Raj as Subramaniam
- Radhika Apte as Nalini
- Akash Puri as Karthik Subramaniam
- Sriteja as Kaveri Subramaniam
- Brahmanandam as Subramaniam's boss
- Nassar as Karthik's Cricket Coach
- Hema as History Teacher
- Tanikella Bharani as Karthik's School Principal
- Murali Sharma as Ghani Bhai (dubbed by Samuthirakani)
- Sarath Babu as the Chief Minister of Tamil Nadu/Andhra Pradesh
- Thalaivasal Vijay as Neurosurgeon
- Chaams as Subramaniam's coworker
- Ananth Babu as Subramaniam's coworker
- Vishwanath as Subramaniam's neighbour
- Gollapudi Maruti Rao as Samudram
- Sri Lakshmi as Subramaniam's coworker
- Singamuthu as Office peon
- Shankar Melkote as Subramaniam's neighbour
- Pasanga Sivakumar as Subramaniam's neighbour
- Gundu Hanumantha Rao as Sri Kumaran Silks worker
- 'Thadi' Balaji as Vegetable vendor
- Kotesh Manava as Police officer
- Muthukaalai as School peon
- Rekha Suresh as Teacher
- Pragathi in a photograph appearance as Subramaniam's late wife
- Prabhu Deva in a guest appearance in song "Vaangum Panathukkum"/"Mattiloni Chettu"
- C. Gopinath in a special appearance as a host of Neeya Naana

== Production ==
In August 2011, Prakash Raj announced that he would direct a Tamil-Telugu bilingual named Dhoni. He said, "The film deals with the pressure that children undergo these days in schools". Hindi film actress Radhika Apte confirmed that she was playing a pivotal role. Telugu film director Puri Jagannadh's son Akash was selected to portray Prakash Raj's son, making his acting debut. In November 2011, Prabhu Deva shot for five days for a cameo role in Pondicherry.

== Soundtrack ==
The soundtrack and background score were composed by Ilaiyaraaja. The audio launch was held on 28 January 2012, with a special live performance by Ilaiyaraaja.

All lyrics are written by Na. Muthukumar.

Tamil
No.	Title	Singer(s)	Length
1.	"Chinna Kanniley"	Naresh Iyer, Shreya Ghoshal
2.	"Vaangum Panathukkum"	S. P. Balasubrahmanyam
3.	"Vilayaattaa Padagotty" (female)	Shreya Ghoshal
4.	"Thaavi Thaavi Pogum"	Ilaiyaraaja
5.	"Vilayaattaa Padagotty" (male)	Hariharan

All lyrics are written by Sirivennela Seetharama Sastry.

Telugu
No.	Title	Singer(s)	Length
1.	"Chitti Chitti Adugaa"	Naresh Iyer, Shreya Ghoshal
2.	"Mattiloni Chettu"	S. P. Balasubrahmanyam
3.	"Endhaaka Nee Payanam" (female)	Surmukhi Raman
4.	"Gayam Thagili"	Ilaiyaraaja
5.	"Endhaaka Nee Payanam" (male)	Sathyan

== Release ==
Dhoni was released on 10 February 2012. The Telugu version was distributed by Sri Venkateswara Creations.

=== Reception ===
The Times of India rated it 3.5 out of 5, saying, "...thanks to a combination of inspired acting, stimulating writing, a stirring background score and fine camera work, the film rises above the ordinary to make for a compelling cinema experience." Sify wrote "On the whole, [don't] miss Dhoni. The beauty of the narration is that the message applies to everyone and it might change your life".

=== Accolades ===
Ceremony	Category	Nominee	Result	Ref.
2nd South Indian International Movie Awards	Best Actor in a Supporting Role	Prakash Raj	Nominated	
2nd South Indian International Movie Awards	Best Actress in a Supporting Role	Radhika Apte	Nominated	
Tamil Nadu State Film Awards	Third Best Film	Dhoni	Won	
