= Mehbooba (2018 film) =

Indian film

- Theatrical release poster
- Directed by: Puri Jagannadh
- Written by: Puri Jagannadh; Thatavarthi Kiran; A. Sreedhar
- Produced by: Puri Jagannadh; Charmy Kaur
- Starring: Akash Puri; Neha Shetty
- Cinematography: Vishnu Sarma
- Edited by: Junaid Siddiqui
- Music by: Sandeep Chowta
- Production company: Puri Connects
- Release date: 11 May 2018
- Country: India
- Language: Telugu

Mehbooba is a 2018 Indian Telugu-language reincarnation romantic action drama film directed by Puri Jagannadh and starring his son, Akash Puri, and Neha Shetty.

== Plot ==
This story starts with Roshan a self confident Hindu youth from Hyderabad who aims to join in Indian army. He has supporting friends and family to pursue his dream though his father does not support him to join army but after his wife insistence he accepts his aim. Afreen a shy Pakistani girl who belongs to Lahore came from a traditional muslim family got her Admission at JNTU Hyderabad, India in a student exchange program. Her father not accepts her to pursue her career but she gets his permission to get married of his choice. Then he arranges a match with Nadir a rich and arrogant man who disrespects women in the name of tradition and had lust on Afreen. Then she happily came to Hyderabad to pursue her engineering. Roshan and Afreen shares a common recurring dream that ends with being killed and connects emotionally with a song called "Lag ja gale" from Woh Kaun Thi film.

Then it is revealed that Afreen's first day of college Roshan completed his graduation. Later Afreen faces ragging from her college peers by forcing her to learn Telugu. After learning telugu they became close friends with her meanwhile roshan makes friendship with a Pakistani student called Shabbir in a chaos. Later after coming from a party a women trafficking gang tries to abduct her then Roshan comes to her rescue and successfully saves her from the gang in the fight they didn't see each other. She tries to find him out in various ways to thank him but to no avail.

Meanwhile Nadir harasses Afreen in calls then she tells her mother to not marry him. Later after knowing the issue Nadir and his family blames Afreen and raises a doubt having a boyfriend in India. To save her family prestige she calls Afreen to come back and lies that Afreen's father is unwell. However finally Afreen meets Roshan in the train which goes to Delhi for attending an interview for Army and for a trek in the Himalayas. In the first meeting they feel the strange connection between them after knowing that he is the one who saved her from the gang. She thanks him and catches the Samjhauta Express. At Lahore her father decided to get married forcefully and started the wedding preparations with Nadir.

Meanwhile after completion of successful Interview, in the trek Roshan accidentally finds out a dead body which looks like Afreen, carrying a diary along with a photograph of Roshan which names him as Kabir. Then he reads the diary written by the girl Madira. Then the story shifts to the Indo-Pakistani war of 1971 in the village of Kandiwara in Jammu and Kashmir. In the war Pakistan army occupied the Kandiwara and takes the civilians as hostages. In the army a rogue Havaldar tries to molest Madira a hindu villager then Kabir a Muslim Pakistani soldier stops him and bashes him to protect her. On the grounds of not following superiors orders he was sentenced to flogging. Then having concern for protecting her Madira had started a good relationship with Kabir and soon it turns into a passionate love. After observing their relationship the Havaldar having an insatiable lust on Madira warns her to kill Kabir soon by himself in the war. Later, the Indian Army recaptures its territories. Then in the war Havaldar tries to kill Kabir but in the face off Kabir managed to kill Havaldar then his colleagues support his action by covering up as a death casualty.

After completion of war Kabir reveals to Madira that it maybe a last meeting for them. Then Madira wishes to stay with him forever then Kabir reveals his feelings on her decided to return to the Pakistani borders. Later he decided to meet her and crossed the Indian border then started eloping to Pakistan border. Then Indian Army stops them and kills Kabir at the same time the land slides are broken down then Madira had died in the cave. After reading the diary Roshan realised that it was rebirth of them to regain their love.

The topic became a sensation in Indian media. Hidayatullah doesn't bothers this and completely restricts Afreen by taking her cell phone and house arrested her. Meanwhile Roshan recruited as a captain in Indian Army and getting support from his friends, family and entire India including Indian Army except his father who feared for his life. Then Afreen contacts Roshan through a telephone and reveals she was in Lahore. Then Roshan catches the Samjhauta Express. After knowing his arrival to Lahore Nadir and his men searches him in the train. When they are about to find him Shabbir comes to his rescue and saves him.

Later after severe search of Afreen Through one of the Afreen's friend he learned about Nadir and lodges a false complaint against him in the local police station. The police find him and bring him to PS. Then waiting for the right opportunity Roshan managed to escape from the PS and follows them to Hidayatulla's Home. Then there a new chaos ensues between Roshan and Hidayatulla. Then Nadir bashes Roshan and hands him over to the police. Then Roshan reveals all the facts on Facebook live and escapes from the cops. Then he comes to Hidayatulla's home proposes to elope again. Then Afreen comes with him after a rough chase Shabbir has been killed by Nadir's goons however they managed to come till the border. Then Pakistan army also joins with Nadir then the Indian army also involves in the issue and warns them to not intervene in this matter else they will have to face a severe consequence. After lot of chaos then the film ends with Roshan this time successfully crossing the border along with Afreen by Injuring Nadir severely with the support of Indian Army and ready for his training as Captain.

== Cast ==
- Akash Puri as Roshan/Kabir
- Neha Shetty as Afreen/Madhira
- Vishu Reddy as Nadir Khan Mohammed
- Murali Sharma as Hidayatulla Khan, Afreen's father
- Ashwini Kalsekar as Muntaz, Afreen's mother
- Sayaji Shinde as Roshan's father
- Pramodini as Roshan's mother
- Sukhpal Singh as Nadir's father
- Sunita Singh as Nadir's mother
- Sreedhar Ar as a train passenger
- Uday Kumar Bagavathula as the principal
- Pramod Chowdary as Pakistan SI
- Mohammed Shoaib Khan as an Indian army major
- Divya Gowda as a lecturer
- Master Yatish as young Roshan
- Amishi Gusain as young Afreen
- Amit Anand Raut as a disco jockey
- Vangapandu Satya as a peon
- Srikanth Iyyengar as a police officer
- Kalyan Vasanth as a doctor
- Gopinder Vatsayayen as Pakistan major

== Soundtrack ==
The music is composed by Sandeep Chowta.

No.	Title	Singer(s)	Length
1.	"Oh Priya Na Priya"	Sandeep Batra, Pragya Dasgupta	3:32
2.	"Naa Pranam"	Varijashree Venugopal	4:56
3.	"Saiyaan"	Ambika Jois	3:52
4.	"Pichi Pichi Gaa"	Paroma Dasgupta	3:49
5.	"Soul of Mehbooba"	Deepak Pandit, Alwyn Fernandes	3:10
6.	"Aa Bi Jaa"	Pragya Dasgupta, Sandeep Batra	4:28
Total length:			23:47

== Reception ==
The Times of India gave the film two-and-a-half out of five stars and wrote that "However, the film is worth a watch, if only for the honest attempt made". The Hindu wrote that "Puri Jagannadh needed more zip and emotion to make a viewer buy a reincarnation plot".
