= P. G. Vinda =

Indian cinematographer and director (born 1976)

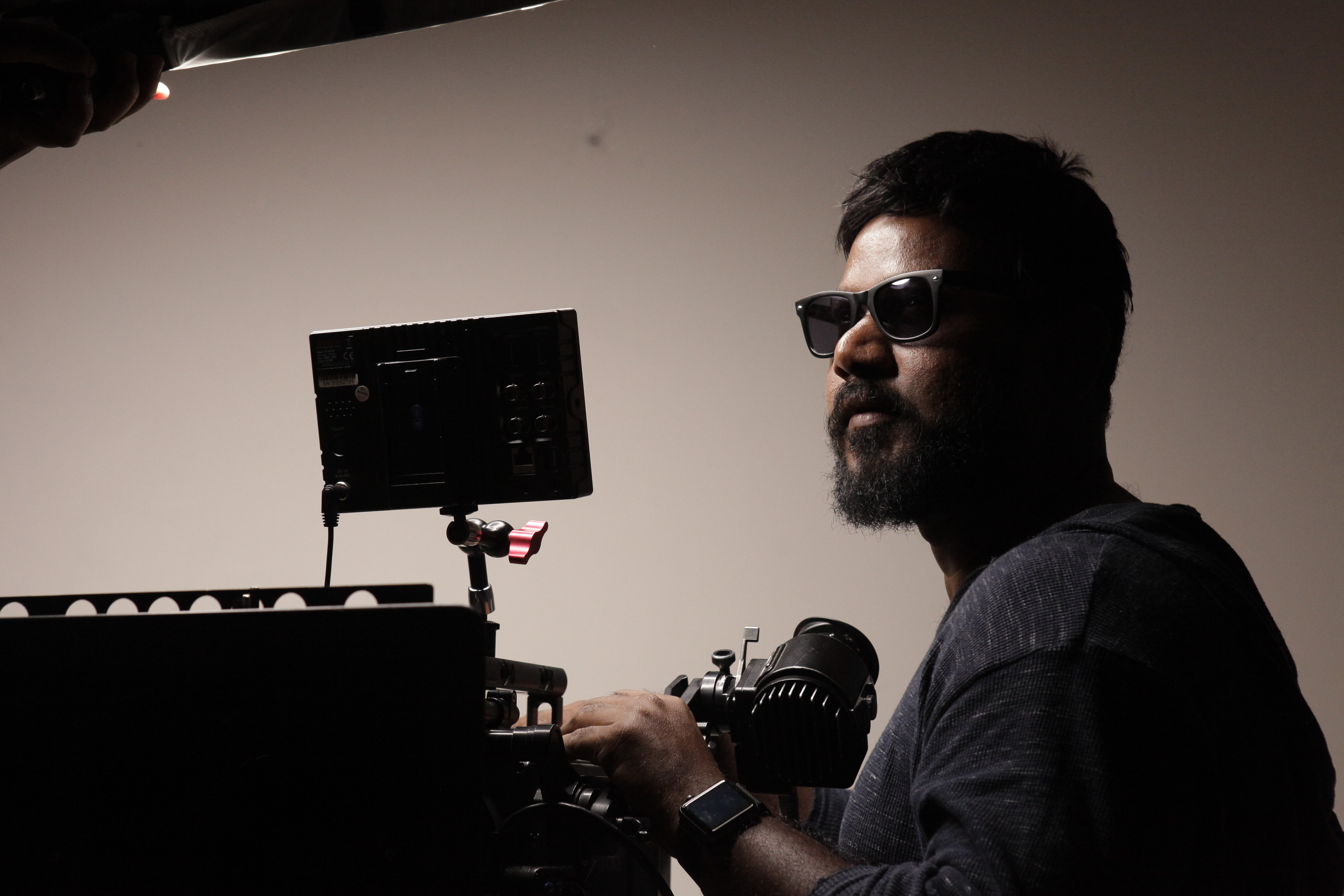
- Born: 10 May 1976 (age 49); Palem, Andhra Pradesh, India (now in Telangana, India)
- Occupation(s): Cinematographer, film director and film producer
- Title: Indian cinematographer

P. G. Vinda is an Indian cinematographer and director who works in Telugu films. He is known for his work on the 2004 black-and-white film, Grahanam, which was directed by Mohan Krishna Indraganti. Other Vinda films include Anumanaspadam, Ashta Chemma, and Vinayakudu. He made his directorial debut with the children's movie The Lotus Pond (2011).

== Early life and education ==
Vinda was born into a Telugu-speaking Hindu farming family in Palem, a village in Mahbubnagar, Telangana. He studied at AP Residential School from Beechupally, located on the banks of the Krishna River, APRDC silver-jubilee degree college Kurnool.

== Filmography ==
- Note: all films are in Telugu, unless otherwise noted.

Year	Film	Notes
2004	Grahanam	International Film Festival of India
2005	Nandanavanam 120km	
2007	Anumanaspadam	
2008	Ashta Chamma	
2008	Vinayakudu	
2009	Sneha Geetham	
2010	Adi Nuvve	
2011	Key	
2011	It's My Love Story	
2011	The Lotus Pond	English film The Golden Elephant (ICFFI)
2013	D/O Ram Gopal Varma	
2013	Anthaka Mundu Aa Tarvatha	
2013	Aa Aiduguru	
2014	Romeo	
2014	Ninnindale	Kannada film
2014	Bandipotu	
2015	Jyothy Lakshmi	
2015	Loafer	
2016	Gentleman	
2017	Luckunnodu	
2017	Ami Thumi	
2018	Sammohanam	
2020	V	
2022	Aa Ammayi Gurinchi Meeku Cheppali	
2023	Mama Mascheendra	
2024	Time Traveler	
2024	Purushothamudu	
2025	Sarangapani Jathakam	

=== As director and writer ===
- The Lotus Pond (2010) (English and Telugu)
