= Dongala Mutha =

- Theatrical release poster
- Directed by: Ram Gopal Varma
- Written by: Nilesh Girkar
- Produced by: Kiran Kumar Koneru
- Starring: Ravi Teja; Charmy; Prakash Raj; Lakshmi Manchu; Sunil; Bramhanandam; Subbaraju; Brahmaji; Supreeth
- Cinematography: FX School and VFX @ FX
- Edited by: FX School and VFX @ FX
- Music by: Amar Mohile
- Production companies: Shreya Production & Dreamforce
- Release date: 18 March 2011
- Running time: 92 minutes
- Country: India
- Language: Telugu

Dongala Mutha (transl. Gang of thieves) is a 2011 Indian Telugu-language comedy action thriller film directed by Ram Gopal Varma. The film stars Ravi Teja, Charmy, Prakash Raj, Lakshmi Manchu, Sunil, Bramhanandam, Subbaraju and Supreeth Reddy. This film is the first of its kind in Indian cinema as it was shot with just 7 crew members and in a record of 5 days. Prior to filming, Varma announced that this film has no budget and that the cast and crew will not be taking remunerations until the film hits theaters.

Puri Jagannadh is co-director while director Harish Shankar (Mirapakaya fame) is associate director. Music is composed by Sathyam while the background score has been rendered by Amar Mohile (of Sarkar Raj fame).

Dongala Mutha was released on 18 March 2011, which was exactly 33 days after the shooting ended. The filmmaking process was revolutionized through Canon 5D cameras. The film remained an instant hit at the box office.

== Plot ==
A couple, Sudheer (Ravi Teja) and Rani (Charmy), is traveling in a car on a deserted road for a friend's marriage. They take a shortcut to reach the venue, when their car conks out, and they end up in an old, dilapidated, a seedy resort. They meet a weird hotel staff member (Subbaraju) who claims he is the receptionist. He tells them that the hotel is full. Another guy, who calls himself the manager (Supreeth), tells them that one room is vacant and they are allotted room 8. Inside the hotel, Sudheer and Rani realize the room has not been cleaned for many days. When they order lunch, the resort staff brings the menu but says that nothing is available. Sudheer shouts at the staff, and they tell him that he can take their car and drive to a nearby village where he can get a mechanic, but they tell him he cannot take his wife with him. Sudheer gets irritated and asks them to get out. Soon, both hear weird sounds from the next room. But to their surprise, that adjacent room is locked. Sudheer slowly starts realizing that he and Rani are getting more and more trapped in a do-or-die situation.

When asked, the receptionist tells them the source of the sound from the neighboring room is a ghost. The manager says it is not a ghost, but a thief. Frightened at their gestures, Sudheer and Rani try to get out of the resort, but the manager, receptionist, and servant (Brahmaji) hold them captive and keep Rani in room 9 - the same room as the one with the ghost. However, Sudheer and Rani manage to escape from them but are trapped in the same building. The three men at the resort are actually kidnappers working for a don Munna Bhai. They have kidnapped a businessman Narayana Murthy (Brahmanandam), and locked him up in room number 9. To solve the kidnap mystery, cops Shiva (Lakshmi Manchu) and Richard (Sunil) arrive at the resort, feigning to convey the message that Munna has been arrested. What ensues now is a game of hiding and seeking as Sudheer, Rani, and Narayana are now on the run. Finally, a cop-on-duty (Prakash Raj) arrives to arrest The Mutha, later revealing himself to be Munna. A cat and mouse chase happens and finally the kidnappers get killed and Munna Bhai gets arrested.

== Cast ==
- Ravi Teja as Sudheer
- Charmy as Rani
- Prakash Raj as Munna Bhai
- Lakshmi Manchu as Shiva
- Sunil as Richard
- Bramhanandam as Narayana Murthy (Ghost)
- Subbaraju as Hotel Receptionist
- Brahmaji as Hotel Servant
- Supreeth as Hotel Manager "Papa"
- Satya Prakash

== Production ==
=== Development ===
Normally, a film takes between 2–6 months to shoot, and more than 150 to 200 crew members will be working on it. However, the unique thing about this film is that this 90-minute-long feature film was completed in just 5 days from start to finish, with a crew of just 5 people, including Ram Gopal Varma. No one in this film was paid. It was made only with those actors and technicians who were excited to be a part of the project. All the people who were working for the film would only be paid after the release, if and only if the film made profits, and those payments would be in accordance with their individual value additions.

There was no generator, no lights, no equipment of any sort, including jibs, trolleys, etc., as the entire film was shot hand-held and in natural light. The pilot track for the sound was recorded by the cameras themselves.

=== Filming ===
The innovative challenge of using Canon cameras as opposed to the traditional movie cameras was first technically proved before shooting commenced by making a test print out of a few scenes shot that came out perfectly. Principal photography then started on 9 February 2011 and the entire shooting of Dongala Mutha was completed ahead of schedule. The entire film was shot hand held and in natural light with 5 Canon cameras which were used to capture every shot in 5 different angles simultaneously. No lights or equipment of any sort, including jibs, trolleys, etc., were used. There was no D.O.P for the film, and all the individual operators chose the angles or compositions without the director or anyone guiding or coordinating them.

Canon 5D cameras were used because they give excellent output with naked-eye quality without using any additional lights. It costs around ₹1.5 lakhs to buy each of these cameras. The film was wrapped up in a record four and a half days, earlier than the announced five days, and was released on 18 March. Finally, Ram Gopal Varma revealed in a press conference at the Promo Launch that the production cost of the movie is just ₹6,50,000, mostly for renting out a premises and other miscellaneous expenses.

== Crew ==
"The whole point of doing Dongala Mutha with these cameras is to remind ourselves that in an age of new technologies pushing up our budgets we can use the same to go ultra low on our budgets thereby reminding ourselves that we need to be the masters of technology and not become its slaves."
— Ram Gopal Varma

The seven member crew on location consisted of the Director, an Assistant Director, and 5 Camera operators, and the unit breakup is as follows:

No.	Crew Member
1	Director
2	Associate Director
3	Five Canon 5D camera operators

== Soundtrack ==
Composer Sathyam scored the film's title track, his second collaboration with Ram Gopal Varma after Deyyam. The music video for the song was picturised on the cast, which included Ravi Teja, Charmme Kaur, Lakshmi Manchu, Sunil (actor), Subbaraju, Brahmaji, Prakash Raj, Brahmanandam, and Supreet by noted director S. Harish Shankar at the deserted Aluminium Factory in Gachibowli, Hyderabad. The song was shot completely on a Canon DSLR Camera in one day.

No.	Song	Singers	Lyricist	Length (min:sec)
1	"Debbaku Tha Dongala Mutha"	Hema Chandra, Sravana Bhargavi (Additional vocals by Bharadwaj)	Sirasri	03:29
