= Neha Shetty =

Indian actress

- Born: Mangalore, Karnataka, India
- Education: New York Film Academy
- Occupations: Actress; model
- Years active: 2016–present

Neha Shetty is an Indian actress and model who primarily appears in Telugu films. Shetty made her debut with the Kannada film Mungaru Male 2 in 2016, and went on to star in Telugu films such as Mehbooba, Gully Rowdy. She had her career breakthrough with DJ Tillu, which earned her nomination for Filmfare Award for Best Actress – Telugu.

== Early life ==
Shetty was born on 5 December 1999 to Tulu speaking Hindu family from Mangalore and brought up in Bangalore. Her mother is a dentist while her father is a businessman, and she has a younger sister.

== Career ==
Shetty began her career in modelling and won the Miss Mangalore beauty pageant in 2014, and was the runner up of Miss South India 2015. Shashank cast her in the Kannada film Mungaru Male 2 after an extensive search. Though the film garnered mixed reviews, Shetty's performance was appreciated. Shyam Prasad S of Bangalore Mirror stated that she made a promising start to her career.

Later, she was cast in the Puri Jagannadh-directed Telugu film Mehbooba (2018). Shetty was not familiar with Telugu before but learned the language for the film. Firstpost critic Hemanth Kumar felt that the film did not offer Shetty which has scope for performance. Following Mehbooba, Shetty took a break of six months to pursue an acting course in New York Film Academy.

In 2021, she appeared in two films. She played a lead in Gully Rowdy, in addition to a small role in Most Eligible Bachelor. In 2022, she starred in DJ Tillu. Thadhagath Pathi of The Times of India wrote Shetty was "really impressive" in the film, and stole the show along with Siddhu Jonnalagadda. The Hindu critic Sangeetha Devi Dundoo opined that she pulled of a "complex character" well. She was then seen in Bedurulanka 2012.

== Filmography ==
Key
†	Denotes films that have not yet been released

=== Films ===
- All films are in Telugu, unless otherwise noted.

Year	Film	Role	Notes	Ref.
2016	Mungaru Male 2	Nandini	Kannada film	
2018	Mehbooba	Afreen / Madhira		
2021	Gully Rowdy	Patapagalu Sahitya		
2021	Most Eligible Bachelor	Megha		
2022	DJ Tillu	Radhika		
2023	Bedurulanka 2012	Chitra		
2023	Rules Ranjann	Sana		
2024	Tillu Square	Radhika	Cameo appearance	
2024	Gangs of Godavari	Bujji Rathna		
2025	They Call Him OG	Bar Dancer	Special appearance in the song "Kiss Kiss Bang Bang"	
2025	Dude	Amudha	Tamil film; cameo appearance	
TBA	Tyson Naidu †	TBA	Post-production	

=== Music video ===
Year	Title	Artist	Language	Ref.
2017	"Chocolate Girl"	Chandan Shetty	Kannada	

== Awards and nominations ==
Year	Award	Category	Work	Result	Ref.
2023	South Indian International Movie Awards	Best Actress – Telugu	DJ Tillu	Nominated	
2023	Filmfare Awards South	Best Actress – Telugu	DJ Tillu	Nominated	
