= The Lotus Pond =

- Official poster
- Directed by: P. G. Vinda
- Written by: P. G. Vinda
- Produced by: AL Nitin Kumar
- Starring: Akash Puri; Rohit Ranka; Karan Sehgal; Harsh Khurana
- Cinematography: P. G. Vinda
- Edited by: GV Chandra Shekar
- Music by: Sunil Kashyap
- Production company: TIM (P) LTD
- Release date: 30 September 2011
- Running time: 78 minutes
- Country: India
- Language: English

The Lotus Pond is a 2011 Indian English-language children's film based on boarding school life and an adventure drama film written, and directed by P.G. Vinda. It was selected for the Competition Section of the 17th International Children's Film Festival. Andhra Pradesh government has exempted the film from entertainment tax. The film was dubbed in Telugu with the same name.

== Plot ==
Two school boys learn of a lotus pond in the Himalayas. After journeying through multiple villages, did they find it?

== Cast ==
- Akash Puri as Neeraj
- Rohit Rankha as Ajay
- Harsh Khurana as Choudary
- Swati Chandel as Sheela
- Karan Sehagal as Khemu
- Ramavtar Yadav as School Principal

== Production ==
The film was shot in Patlipul and the film crew trekked for four days to reach the lotus pond.
