= Manorama (film) =

- Directed by: V Eeswar Reddy
- Written by: Padmasri (dialogues)
- Screenplay by: V Eeswar Reddy
- Story by: Padmasri
- Produced by: P Goenka
- Starring: Charmy Kaur; Nishan
- Cinematography: Jagan JRJ
- Edited by: Marthand K Venkatesh
- Music by: Koti
- Distributed by: Zee Motion Pictures
- Release date: 24 March 2009
- Country: India
- Language: Telugu

Manorama is a 2009 Telugu-language film directed by V Eshwar Reddy starring Charmy Kaur and Nishan in lead roles. The music was composed by Koti.

== Plot ==
The story begins with Gitanjali, also known as Gilli (Charmy Kaur), who comes to Hyderabad to spend a few days with her friends (Lahari and Sridhar). She lives near Manorama café and there comes a stranger (Nishan) with a bag. His motive is to detonate a bomb in the café, meanwhile Gilli is bored and wants to kill time. With her lip reading skills, she figures out from a distance that a boy is threatening to commit suicide on phone to his girlfriend. Gilli becomes the angel, also notices the number with her abilities and calls up that girl. She comes to Manorama to inform the lover boy, but instead the bomber sees her and falls for her. A few twists of events happen and the bomb also fails to explode on time. Meanwhile, both the stranger and Gilli get to know each other and in no time, they fall in love with each other though they don't admit it. What happens from there forms the rest of the story.

== Cast ==
- Charmy Kaur as Geetanajali "Gilli"
- Nishan as Terrorist
- Lahari Arundhati Vishnuvazhala as Priya
- Pradeep Machiraju as Rahul
- Jai Dhanush as Vasu, Lakshmi's lover
- Sudeepa Pinky as Lakshmi
- Master Sai Kumar as Chotu
- Sridhar Rao as Arvind
- Dheer Charan Srivastav
- Ali as Lakshmi Mittal
- M. S. Narayana as Jeevan Reddy, Insurance Agent
- Narsing Yadav as Moneylender

== Soundtrack ==
The music was composed by Koti with lyrics by Venigalla Rambabu except where noted. The audio launch function was held on 25 March 2009 at Radio Mirchi station in Begumpet, Hyderabad.

- "Life Ante Enjoy" (04:41) - Madhumita
- "Hyderabad Antene" (04:06) - Srikanth, Murali, Baby Sahithi, Masterji, Venkat, Siva, Venugopal, Lyricist: Masterji
- "Idivarakeragani E Kadha" (07:43) - Koti, Geetha Madhuri
- "Swarganiki Short Route" (04:33) - Sri Krishna, Raghuram, Hanuman Murali, Srikanth, Sudha Krishna
- "Idivarakeragani E Kadha" (Pathos) (01:15) - Usha
