= Mantra 2 =

- Directed by: S. V. Satish
- Produced by: Srikanth; Souri Reddy; Ravi Teja
- Starring: Charmme Kaur; Chethan Cheenu
- Music by: Sunil Kashyap
- Production company: Teja Films
- Release date: 1 July 2015
- Country: India
- Language: Telugu

Mantra 2 is a 2015 Indian Telugu-language horror thriller film directed by Satish and starring Charmme Kaur and Chethan Cheenu. The film is based on real incidents. The film was also Charmy's last Telugu film to date, as a leading actress. The film however, is not a sequel to Mantra (2007).

== Plot ==
Mantra, moves to Hyderabad after getting a job in a software company. She lost her parents years back and used to live most of her life in hostels. When arriving in Hyderabad, she is approached by a Taxi driver apparently an assistant sent by her employer. She, as she usually does, wants to stay at any hostel. However the taxi driver suggests being a paying guest at an elderly couple' home in the city. The older couple, Ramarao and his wife are very friendly. As she starts her job and continues her routine, she feels as if someone is following to kill her. In such situations, she is confronted by a team of police who accuse her of being the culprit of scandal though it turns out to be a prank by one of her ex-classmate Vijay who is now a police officer posted in Hyderabad. Their friendship grows stronger and become closer and in due course Vijay introduces Mantra to his family with an intention of marriage. Also, Mantra tells about her experiences of encountering people who are trying to kill her. Vijay who agrees to follow-up on her scenario and end up in a shock to find out that Mantra is living in a home which is entwined in a murder investigation. Vijay along with couple of media people and Mantra herself goes to her accommodation. On entering, Mantra will be shocked to see the state of the home. Vijay shows a file which has photographs of the elderly couple along with the driver who approaches her at the railway station. Though Vijay thinks Mantra is hallucinating of staying in the house, she proves her stay be showing her luggage and documents in her room. The others understand that Mantra has been staying in ghost infested house and try to escape. Their plan is foiled as the doors close obstructing their escape. They instantly try calling someone from the outside world but Mantra informs them that the house doesn't receive any reception, which she experiences during her stay. Now blocked in the house, they try finding a way out. The ghostly presence starts killing one after the other. Vijay discovers that one of them is killed purely out of shock on seeing something which is revealed to be Mantra's photo. The ghostly presence then reveals through a letter that Mantra is in fact his daughter who happens to be twins. Mantra grew up as daughter of the elderly couple' family friends as their offspring dies during birth on the same time when they are blessed with twins, Mantra & Anjali. Anjali is killed by Ramarao's brother in an accident. During the mourning, Ramarao gets to know that his twin daughter is now orphaned as her foster parents are also killed in an accident. Ramarao reveals to his wife about the other daughter and they agree to invite her to live with them as their daughter and give her all their wealth. On knowing this intention of his brother, Ramarao's younger brother plans and kills Ramarao and his wife. Unbeknownst about this, Manta lives in the home which makes her an easy target to Ramarao's brother. Just before Vijay and Mantra leaves the home, Ramarao's brother opens the door and reveals his killing plan. Ramarao's soul possesses Mantra and kills his brother. Vijay and Mantra embrace each other and leave the house.

== Cast ==
- Charmme Kaur as Mantra
- Chethan Cheenu as Vijay
- Tanikella Bharani as Ramarao
- Delhi Rajeshwari as Ramarao's wife
- Rahul Dev as Ramarao's brother
- Uttej
- Raghu Babu
- Venu Yeldandi
- Annapurna
- Shankar Melkote
- Chatrapathi Sekhar
- Ravipalli Rambabu
- Lab Sarath
- Sujatha
- Potti Rambabu

== Production ==
The film was planned to be made as a bilingual in Telugu and Tamil.

== Release and box office ==
Mantra 2 was released on 1 July 2015. It was declared a flop after its release and box office collection.

== Reception ==
Pranita Jonnnalagedda of The Times of India gave the film a rating of 2/5 and said that "While Mantra 2 has its heart in the right place, its heartbeats constantly fluctuate leaving you with an unsatisfying experience". Srivatsan Nadadhur of The Hindu said that "The heart of the story is significantly similar to the prequel and keeping aside a single twist, the film never rises above a fabricated model piece of horror". A critic from The Hans India opined that "Mantra-2 can scare you half. But some scenes in the film will definitely leave you at the edge of your seats". A critic from 123 Telugu wrote that "Except for Charme’s star appeal, this film has neither the thrills nor the so called interesting suspense elements".
