= Anumanaspadam =

- Promotional poster
- Directed by: Vamsy
- Written by: Vamsi Krishna Akella
- Produced by: Satish Thati; Jai Arnala
- Starring: Aryan Rajesh; Hamsa Nandini; Tanikella Bharani; Jaya Prakash Reddy
- Cinematography: P. G. Vinda
- Edited by: A. Sreekar Prasad
- Music by: Ilaiyaraaja
- Release date: 10 February 2007
- Country: India
- Language: Telugu

Anumanaspadam is a 2007 Indian Telugu-language mystery thriller film directed by Vamsy. Aryan Rajesh and Hamsa Nandini play the lead roles. while Tanikella Bharani and Jaya Prakash Reddy play supporting roles. The music was composed by Ilaiyaraaja, with cinematography by P. G. Vinda. The film was released on 10 February 2007.

== Plot ==
After hardcore smuggler Dheerappan was killed in a shootout by police, a reporter named Bhavaraju Suryanarayana, alias Bhasu happened to watch a video cassette recorded by a dead smuggler. From the video, he learns about a secret treasure trove buried in a forest. Bhasu plans to grab the treasure, so he forms a team of a few people. They make a move towards the forests in a hired vehicle and enter the same. Having risked their lives, the treasure hunters swoop in on the trove. All of a sudden, the team members get killed one after the other. By the time the survivors come to know what is happening, they are nearly finished. Who the killer is forms the main suspense.

== Cast ==
- Aryan Rajesh as Bhavaraju Suryanarayana / Bhasu
- Hamsa Nandini as Devika
- Tanikella Bharani as Forest Officer
- Jaya Prakash Reddy as Thangavelu
- Vanitha Reddy as Kamini
- Lakshmipati
- M. S. Narayana as Bhasu's boss

== Soundtrack ==
Anumanaspadam

Soundtrack album by Ilaiyaraaja
- Released: 2007
- Length: 25:30
- Language: Telugu

The music and background score was composed by Ilaiyaraaja. The song "Prathi Dhinam" is reused from "Mayanginen Solla Thayanginen" from Naane Raja Naane Mandhiri (1985).

No.	Song	Singer	Writer
1	"Prathi Dhinam"	Shreya Ghoshal, P. Unnikrishnan	Vamsy
2	"Ninu Vethiki"	Shreya Ghoshal, Vijay Yesudas	Veturi
3	"Kuylaalo"	Shreya Ghoshal	Veturi
4	"Mallello Illese"	Sadhana Sargam, Hariharan	Veturi
5	"Raa Raa Raa"	Sonu Nigam, Ilaiyaraaja	Veturi
6	"Rela Rela Rela"	Bhavatharini, Tippu	Veturi

== Reception ==
Rediff said that, "Anumanaspadam is worth a watch."
