= Liger (film) =

2022 Indian film by Puri Jagannadh

- Theatrical release poster
- Directed by: Puri Jagannadh
- Written by: Puri Jagannadh
- Produced by: Vijay Deverakonda; Charmme Kaur; Karan Johar; Apoorva Mehta; Hiroo Yash Johar
- Starring: Vijay Deverakonda; Ananya Panday; Mike Tyson; Ramya Krishna; Ronit Roy
- Cinematography: Vishnu Sarma
- Edited by: Junaid Siddiqui; Akash Ahuja Casting
- Music by: Vikram Montrose; Tanishk Bagchi; Lijo George-DJ Chetas; Sunil Kashyap; Jaani
- Production companies: Dharma Productions; Puri Connects
- Distributed by: AA Films
- Release date: 25 August 2022
- Running time: 138 minutes
- Country: India
- Languages: Hindi; Telugu
- Budget: ₹125 crore
- Box office: est. ₹60.80 crore

Liger - Saala Crossbreed is a 2022 Indian sports masala film written and directed by Puri Jagannadh. It is shot simultaneously in Telugu and Hindi. The film is produced by Dharma Productions and Puri Connects. The film stars Vijay Deverakonda in a dual role as father and son, the titular MMA fighter "Liger" with stammering problems alongside Ananya Panday, Ramya Krishna and Ronit Roy in pivotal roles, and American boxer Mike Tyson.

The film was announced in 2019, and the title Liger was announced in January 2021. The songs are composed by Tanishk Bagchi, Sunil Kashyap, Jaani, DJ Chetas, Lijo George and Vikram Montrose. Principal photography began in January 2020 and suffered production delays after March 2020 due to the COVID-19 pandemic. Filming resumed in February 2021 and after shooting suspensions during the pandemic, Liger was wrapped up in February 2022. The film was Deverakonda and Panday's debut in Hindi and Telugu, respectively.

Liger was released theatrically on 25 August 2022, being panned by critics, especially Pandey's performance, and becoming a box-office bomb, with an estimated box office gross of ₹60.80 crore (US$6.3 million) against a budget of ₹125 crore (US$13 million).

== Plot ==
After his father, Lion Tiger Balram Agarwal's death, in the MMA National Championship, Sashwath Agarwal aka Liger (reference for Lion and Tiger) and his mother Balamani move to Mumbai from Karimnagar. Balamani is determined to turn Liger into a MMA champion and takes him to a coach named Christopher, who trains him. While Liger is on his way to perfection in the sport, he meets a rich young woman, Tanya, and falls in love with her. After learning from her brother Sanju that Liger has a stammering problem, Tanya, apparently embarrassed, leaves him. Liger wins the national championship after getting motivated by the rejection. He moves on to participate in the International Championship, sponsored by Sanju and Tanya's father.

Liger wins every match and moves on to the finals. However, Tanya is kidnapped days before the finals. Upon getting to know of this, Liger confronts Tanya's father. He reveals that he borrowed money from a gangster to set up his business and remains helpless as he could not repay the money back to him. After her father reveals that Tanya broke up with Liger so he could focus on his sport and career after his mother chastised her for being a distraction, Liger decides to save Tanya by himself, which ultimately causes him to miss the final match. He stumbles upon the kidnapper, who happens to be Mark Anderson, his lifelong role model and a legendary MMA fighter.

Anderson challenges him to a fight to get Tanya back. The fight is live streamed at the MMA final. When Liger is on the verge of losing, he remembers the advice that his mother gave him and defeats Anderson. Impressed by his skills, Anderson takes a picture with Liger and Tanya and lets them go. As a result of the successful fight, the MMA jury declares the fight between Anderson and Liger as the final match. Liger becomes a MMA World Champion.

== Cast ==
- Vijay Deverakonda in a dual role as
  - Lion Tiger Balram Agarwal, Liger's late father
  - Sashwath Agarwal alias Liger
    - Master Harsh Roshan as young Liger
- Ananya Panday as Tanya Panday
- Mike Tyson as Mark Anderson
- Ramya Krishna as Balamani Agarwal, Liger's mother and Balram's wife
- Ronit Roy as Christopher, Liger's MMA coach
- Vishu Reddy as Sanju Panday, Tanya's elder brother
- Chunky Panday as Mr. Panday, a businessman and Tanya & Sanju's father
- Makarand Deshpande as Mallesh, a local thug
- Getup Srinu as Ganapath, Liger's MMA friend
- Temper Vamsi as Shankar, Liger's MMA Friend
- Ali as Liger's friend
- Racha Ravi as owner of paan shop and Liger's fan
- Puri Jagannadh in special appearance of song,"Coka 2.0"

== Production ==
=== Pre-production ===
Vijay Deverakonda who plays a MMA fighter with a stutter, underwent a dramatic physical transformation for his role and went to Thailand for martial arts training. After Janhvi Kapoor refused the offer due to dates issues, Ananya Panday was cast opposite Deverakonda. The film's score is composed by Mani Sharma. Composer Tanishk Bagchi is also signed for the film. In September 2021, boxer Mike Tyson signed onto the film, thus making his acting debut in Indian cinema.

=== Filming ===
Filming began on 20 January 2020 in Mumbai, with the tentative title Fighter. 40 days of shoot was completed when production was halted in March 2020 due to the COVID-19 pandemic in India. The filming resumed in February 2021. The second schedule was shot in Hyderabad. The filming was delayed again in April 2021 due to the second wave of the COVID-19 lockdown. The cast and crew resumed the shoot in September 2021. In November 2021, the cast and crew went to Las Vegas to shoot the portions with Mike Tyson. The filming was completed in February 2022.

== Soundtrack ==
Liger

Soundtrack album by Vikram Montrose, Tanishk Bagchi, Lijo George-DJ Chetas, Sunil Kashyap, Jaani
- Recorded: 2021–2022
- Genre: Feature film soundtrack
- Length: 22:06
- Languages: Hindi; Telugu
- Label: Sony Music India
- Producers: Vikram Montrose; Tanishk Bagchi; Lijo George-DJ Chetas; Sunil Kashyap; Jaani

Singles from Liger
- 1. "The Liger Hunt Theme" Released: 9 May 2022; 2. "Akdi Pakdi" Released: 11 July 2022; 3. "Waat Laga Denge" Released: 29 July 2022; 4. "Aafat" Released: 6 August 2022; 5. "Coka 2.0" Released: 12 August 2022; 6. "Attack" Released: 20 August 2022; 7. "Manchali" Released: 27 August 2022; 8. "Mera Banega Tu" Released: 30 August 2022

The music rights are sold to Sony Music India. The first single titled "The Liger Hunt Theme" was released on 9 May 2022, on the occasion of Vijay Deverakonda's birthday. The second single titled "Akdi Pakdi" was released on 11 July 2022. The third single titled "Waat Laga Denge" sung by Vijay Deverakonda was released on 29 July 2022. The fourth single titled "Aafat" was released on 6 August 2022. The fifth single titled "Coka 2.0" was released on 12 August 2022.

Hindi
No.	Title	Lyrics	Music	Singer(s)	Length
1.	"The Liger Hunt Theme"	Farhad Bhiwandiwala, Shekhar Astitwa, Vikram Montrose	Vikram Montrose	Farhad Bhiwandiwala	1:31
2.	"Akdi Pakdi"	Mohsin Shaikh, Azeem Dayani	Lijo George-DJ Chetas, Sunil Kashyap	Dev Negi, Pawni Pandey, Lijo George	3:50
3.	"Waat Laga Denge"	Puri Jagannaadh	Sunil Kashyap	Vijay Deverakonda	1:26
4.	"Aafat"	Rashmi Virag	Tanishk Bagchi	Zahrah S. Khan, Tanishk Bagchi	2:43
5.	"Coka 2.0"	Jaani, Lijo George	Jaani, Lijo George - DJ Chetas	Sukhe, Lisa Mishra	2:46
6.	"Attack"	Farhad Bhiwandiwala	Vikram Montrose	Farhad Bhiwandiwala	3:09
7.	"Manchali"	Farhad Bhiwandiwala	Tanishk Bagchi	Zahrah S Khan, Farhad Bhiwandiwala	2:29
8.	"Mera Banega Tu"	Kunaal Vermaa	Tanishk Bagchi	Lakshay Kapoor	4:07
Total length:					22:06

Telugu
No.	Title	Lyrics	Music	Singer(s)	Length
1.	"The Liger Hunt Theme"	Bhaskarabhatla	Vikram Montrose	Vedala Hemachandra	1:31
2.	"Akdi Pakdi"	Bhaskarabhatla, Mohsin Shaikh, Azeem Dayani	Lijo George-DJ Chetas, Sunil Kashyap	Anurag Kulkarni, Ramya Behara	3:50
3.	"Waat Laga Denge"	Puri Jagannaadh	Sunil Kashyap	Vijay Deverakonda	1:26
4.	"Aafat"	Bhaskarabhatla	Tanishk Bagchi	Simha, Sravana Bhargavi	2:43
5.	"Coka 2.0"	Bhaskarabhatla	Jaani, Lijo George-DJ Chetas	Ram Miriyala, Geetha Madhuri	2:46
6.	"Attack"	Bhaskarabhatla	Vikram Montrose	Anurag Kulkarni	3:09
7.	"Manchali"	Bhaskarabhatla	Tanishk Bagchi	Shanmukha Priya, Raghuram	2:29
8.	"Kalalo Kooda"	Bhaskarabhatla	Tanishk Bagchi	Sid Sriram, Sagar, Vaishnavi Kovvuri	4:07
Total length:					22:06

== Release ==
=== Theatrical ===
Tiger was released on 25 August 2022 in Hindi and Telugu along with dubbed versions in Tamil, Malayalam and Kannada. Earlier in January 2021, the film's release date of 9 September 2021 was announced . But due to production delays caused by COVID-19 pandemic, the film was postponed. The current release date was announced in December 2021.

The film's worldwide theatrical rights were valued at ₹81 crore, the highest for any Deverakonda film.

=== Home media ===
The satellite rights of the film have been acquired by Star India Network, while the digital rights for streaming have been acquired by Disney+ Hotstar. The film was digitally streamed on Disney+ Hotstar from 22 September 2022 in Telugu and dubbed versions of Tamil, Malayalam and Kannada languages. The Hindi version premiered on 21 October 2022.

=== Distribution ===
AA Films and Sri Karthikeya Cinemas has acquired All India distribution rights while Sarigama Cinemas and Phars Film Co acquired overseas distribution rights.

== Reception ==
=== Critical reception ===
Liger received negative reviews from critics and was declared a cringe-fest. On the review aggregator website Rotten Tomatoes, 0% of 13 critics' reviews are positive, with an average rating of 2.2/10.

Neeshita Nyayapati of The Times Of India rated the film 2 out of 5 stars and wrote, "It's ironic that Liger is asked to focus multiple times in the film, but the script itself lacks the same focus." Janani K of India Today rated the film 2 out of 5 stars and wrote, "Liger is a convoluted sports drama with a lacklustre story. In other words, Liger is a wasted opportunity." Sonil Dedhia of News 18 rated the film 1.5 out of 5 stars and wrote, "Liger seems so long that by the end, I started feeling why did I get into this Aafat." She also called Deverakonda's performance as repetitive and tiresome. Sudhir Srinivasan of The New Indian Express rated the film 1.5 out of 5 stars and called it 'a crossbreed between cringe and cliché.' He added, "The kicks and punches in Puri Jagannadh's weakly written Liger seem directed at us." A reviewer for Bollywood Hungama rated the film 1.5 out of 5 stars and wrote, "On the whole, Liger fails to impress due to its silly and bizarre narrative and poor writing. At the box office, it will have a tough time attracting the audience to cinemas."

Shubhra Gupta of The Indian Express rated the film 1 out of 5 stars and wrote, "There's nothing new or fresh about the ingredients that go into the making of this Liger. The plot is filled with all kinds of outlandish situations, and the treatment is jaded." Saibal Chatterjee of NDTV rated the film 1 out of 5 stars and wrote, "Liger is massive mess of a movie that Vijay Deverakonda's newfangled physique and action chops cannot salvage." Sukanya Verma of Rediff.com rated the film 1 out of 5 stars and wrote, "Director Puri Jagannadh's off-putting humour and ridiculous ambitions ensure Liger is a dead duck from the word go." Suresh Bishnoi of cinereveal.com rated the film 1.5 out of 5 stars and wrote, "The film presents a fine example of action choreography, but casting, acting and direction is so sick." Stutee Ghosh of The Quint rated the film 1 out of 5 stars and called the film 'a disappointment of colossal portions.' Sanyukta Thakare of Mashable India rated the film 0.5 out of 5 stars and said, "0.5 is for the longest fight montage I have even seen, also only good part of the movie." Anna M.M. Vetticad of Firstpost rated the film 0 out of 5 stars and wrote, "Liger overflows with the signature tackiness of Puri Jagannadh's films and the misogyny that Vijay Deverakonda has proudly worn on his sleeve since he struck box-office gold with Arjun Reddy."

Sanjukta Sharma of Moneycontrol noted in her review, "Devarakonda has the swagger of a testosterone bomb but has no consistence in his impersonation of either the lover or the fighter. Liger is an example of how cringe-worthy big Bollywood can get to resuscitate ticket sales. This attempt is out-and-out a lost case of such desperation." Monika Rawal Kukreja of Hindustan Times wrote in her review, "Puri Jagannadh's Liger is extremely flawed and below average for the hype it created." She added that the film is devoid of any coherent plot, performances, or action that does not involve the hero strutting in slow-motion. Shomini Sen of WION in her review noted, "Lots of mindless action sequences, arbitrary songs and a story that lacks logic- Liger feels like an ordeal to sit through."

=== Box office ===
Liger grossed ₹23.12 crore worldwide on its opening day including ₹15.3 crore from Andhra Pradesh and Telangana, with a distributor share of ₹13.45 crore including ₹2.56 crore from overseas market. On second day it collected ₹7.7 crore worldwide, on third and fourth day it collected ₹6.55 crore and ₹5.24 crore respectively. So on the weekend it collected India net ₹35.44 crore and ₹48.5 crore worldwide gross.and on fifth day it collected ₹1.5 crore.

Liger performed poorly at the box office. Latha Srinivasan of Firstpost attributed the film's failure to over-hyped promotions and audience expectations. Writing for Hindustan Times, Abhimanyu Mathur stated that the film's team tried to manufacture a pan-Indian success by casting actors from Hindi film industry and failed.

In October 2022, News18 Telugu reported that the film has collected a total worldwide gross of ₹60.80 crore with a distributors' share of ₹28.20 crore. Thus, the film incurred a total loss of ₹61.80 crore.
