= Jyothi Lakshmi (film) =

- Directed by: Puri Jagannadh
- Written by: Malladi
- Produced by: Charmy Kaur; Swethalana; Varun; Teja; C. V. Rao; C. Kalyan
- Starring: Charmy Kaur; Satyadev
- Cinematography: P. G. Vinda
- Edited by: M. S. Rajashekhar Reddy (S. R. Shekhar)
- Music by: Sunil Kashyap
- Production company: Sri Subha Swetha Films
- Distributed by: C. K. Entertainments
- Release date: 12 June 2015
- Country: India
- Language: Telugu

Jyothi Lakshmi is a 2015 Indian Telugu-language drama film written by Malladi and directed by Puri Jagannadh starring and presented by Charmy Kaur in the title role. It was her production debut. It was produced by Swethalana, Varun, Teja, C. V. Rao and C. Kalyan under the banners Sri Subha Swetha films and C. K. Entertainments. Sunil Kashyap composed the film's music and P.G. Vinda was the film's cinematographer. Production began on 25 February 2015 and principal photography began on 8 March 2015. The film is based on the novel Mrs Parankusam by Malladi Venkata Krishna Murthy.

== Plot ==
The film starts off with two young men scouting pimps and visiting brothels to get the right girl that the film's hero Satya (Satyadev) wants. Well, he even gets on to Lapaki app to find a girl which helps them in finding a house instead. After searching for two days, Satya finally finds the girl he wants which happens to be Jyothilakshmi (Charmme Kaur). He insists on marrying her and thanks to her quick wit, gets her out of the place even before he is found and beaten by the villains. The story continues.

== Cast ==
- Charmy Kaur as Jyothi Lakshmi
- Satyadev as Satya
- Brahmanandam as Kamalakar
- Aziz Naser as Pandu
- Ajay Ghosh as Narayan Patwari
- Mouryani
- Uttej
- Apoorva Srinivasan as Sravani
- Saptagiri
- Sampoornesh Babu as Cameo
- Satyam Rajesh
- Krishnudu
- Dhanraj
- Kadambari Kiran
- Sandeep Madhav as Sandy, Satya's friend
- Angela Krislinzki as an Item number "Raja Raja"

== Production ==
=== Development ===
Puri Jagannadh planned to make a female-centric film and after searching for the lead actress from a long time, he approached Charmy Kaur for the lead role, considering her dance and acting prowess; she immediately accepted to be a part of the film. The film was titled Jyothy Lakshmi in early October 2014 and was rumored to be based on the life of a South Indian actress of the same name. The film's story was said to be based on a novel written by Malladi Venkata Krishna Murthy. As Puri bought the rights from Malladi to make a Film. Charmy however clarified in early November 2014 that the film is neither a biopic nor is inspired by any real life character, but a complete commercial entertainer based on a story written by Malladi.

Sunil Kashyap and P.G. Vinda were signed on as the music director and cinematographer of the film respectively in early February 2015 marking their first collaboration with Jagannadh. Charmy opted to become one of the producers of the film and presented it. C. Kalyan bankrolled the film under the banners Sri Subha Swetha films and C. K. Entertainments. The film's production activities began on 25 February 2015 at Hyderabad after conducting a formal pooja ceremony and the film's first look still was unveiled on the same day. The film was confirmed to revolve around the life of a small-time heroine struggling in the film industry and the perspectives of various people who hold low opinions of women working in film industry.

=== Casting ===
Charmy called the character of Jyothy Lakshmi as an intense one and as a reference for her looks, Jagannadh showed her a few old pics of hers and asked her to look as slim as she was in them. For her role, Charmy had to sport a long, black and silky hair for a typical Indian look, adding that she would be seen in two different looks. She took training in belly dancing, freestyle and club dancing. Satyadev played the male lead.

=== Filming ===
Principal photography was expected to begin on 1 March 2015. This movie had a song featuring Angela Krislinzki along with Brahmanandam.

== Soundtrack ==
The Music Was Composed By Sunil Kashyap and Released by Puri Sangeet.

Jyothi Lakshmi

Soundtrack album by Sunil Kashyap
- Released: Jun 4, 2015
- Recorded: 2015
- Genre: Soundtrack
- Length: 24:15
- Label: Puri Sangeet
- Producer: Sunil Kashyap

Sunil Kashyap chronology
| O Malli (2015) | Jyothi Lakshmi (2015) | Appudalaa Ippudilaa (2015) |

Track list
| No. | Title | Singer(s) | Length |
|---|---|---|---|
| 1. | "Ninuchudanga" | Hemachandra | 3:36 |
| 2. | "Chusindhi Chalugaani" | Sravana Bhargavi | 3:06 |
| 3. | "Chetiki Gaajulu" | Sravana Bhargavi | 2:47 |
| 4. | "Vodhodhu" | Venu, Pranavi | 4:20 |
| 5. | "Jyothi Lakshmi" | Uma Neha | 4:11 |
| 6. | "Raja Raja" | Uma Neha | 3:22 |
| 7. | "Kanti Paape" | Lipsika | 2:53 |
| Total length: | | | 24:15 |

== Marketing ==
It began on 8 March 2015 on the eve of International Women's Day which was confirmed by the first look poster released on the same day. A 60-second first look teaser was also unveiled on the same day.

== Critical response ==
The film got mixed to negative reviews becoming a disaster in Puri Jagannath's career. Cochin Talkies rated the movie 2.47 out of 5 and wrote: "Jyothi Lakshmi is a social message film mixed with commercial elements to make it viable at the box office. While the commercial elements are very neatly embedded, Puri missed the plot in adding the required emotional depth to the film which makes it shallow. Jyothi Lakshmi can be at best a one time watch, if you have nothing to do this weekend."

== Release ==
The movie released on 12 June 2015.
