= Romantic (film) =

2021 film by Anil Paduri

- Theatrical release poster
- Directed by: Anil Paduri
- Written by: Puri Jagannadh
- Produced by: Puri Jagannadh; Charmme Kaur
- Starring: Akash Puri; Ketika Sharma; Ramya Krishna
- Cinematography: Naresh K. Rana
- Edited by: Junaid Siddiqui
- Music by: Sunil Kashyap
- Production company: Puri Connects
- Release date: 29 October 2021
- Country: India
- Language: Telugu

Romantic is a 2021 Indian Telugu-language romantic film directed by Anil Paduri. It is written by Puri Jagannadh who co-produced the film with Charmme Kaur under Puri Connects. The film stars Akash Puri, debutante Ketika Sharma and Ramya Krishna. The film was released theatrically on 29 October 2021.

== Plot ==
Vasco da Gama, son of a police officer, is a street smart ruffian who chooses crime to earn a fortune and fulfill his grandma Mary's dream after witnessing his parents' death. He and his childhood friend Annie join Goa’s most notorious mafia druglord Rodrigues’ gang. Within no time, Vasco becomes a kingpin in the Goa underworld. Vasco falls for the charms and ‘back’ beauty of a young musician named Monica. This soon turns into a passionate affair. After a failed drug deal, Vasco kills Rodrigues and proclaims himself as the new mafia king of Goa. In the process, he kills an SI and that's when a dutiful and ruthless ACP Ramya Gowarikar is transferred from Mumbai to Goa to nab Vasco. At the same time Samsun a rival of Rodrigues wants his drugs containers worths crores steels by Vasco and his gang tries to nab him off. After a Cat and Mouse game ensues between the 3 groups finally Vasco achieves his grand mother dream for building a new homes for his community, later he kills Samsun but in the final battle with Ramya he was finally shot dead by her and confess that he Respects her a lot because she was like his father who is very sincere and dies in the arms of Mary. After watching his death Monica shot her self to death just like that. Before dying they hug each other and do a spinning move and shoot at police but they are finally shot by Ramya. Finally film ends that Ramya realises that the Vasco and Monica did not realise they were in love and thinks they are having an affair and dies for it and sadly declares the drug mafia ends in Goa.

== Cast ==
- Akash Puri as Vasco De Gama
- Ketika Sharma as Monica (Voice dubbed by Chinmayi Sripada)
- Ramya Krishna as Ramya Gowarikar
- Rama Prabha as Mary
- Makarand Deshpande as Samsun
- Uttej as John, Monica's brother
- Sunaina as Catherine, John's wife and Monica's sister-in-law
- Deviyani Sharma as Annie, Vasco's best friend and trusted aid; daughter of a cop and lost her parents like Vasco.
- Bharath Reddy as Sub-Inspector Alexander, Vasco's father
- Puri Jagannadh (cameo appearance in the song "Peene Ke Baad")
- Ram Pothineni (cameo appearance in the song "Peene Ke Baad")

== Music ==
Romantic

Soundtrack album by Sunil Kashyap
- Released: 12 October 2021
- Genre: Feature film soundtrack
- Language: Telugu
- Producer: Sunil Kashyap

Sunil Kashyap chronology
Maro Prasthanam (2021)	Romantic (2021)	Kothala Rayudu (2022)
External audio
- Audio Jukebox on YouTube

Singles from Romantic
- 1. "Peena ke Baad" Released: 12 October 2021; 2. "If You Are Mad I'm Your Dad" Released: 14 October 2021; 3. "Naa Valla Kadhe" Released: 18 October 2021; 4. "Mera Naam Vasco De Gama" Released: 22 October 2021; 5. "What Do You Want" Released: 24 October 2021

No.	Title	Lyrics	Singer(s)	Length
1.	"Peena ke Baad"	Puri Jagannadh, Bhaskarabhatla	Sunil Kashyap	3:50
2.	"If You Are Mad I'm Your Dad"	Bhaskarabhatla	Yazin Nizar, Ashwin	3:39
3.	"Naa Valla Kadha"	Bhaskarabhatla	Sunil Kashyap	3:47
4.	"Mera Naam Vasco De Gama"	Puri Jagannadh	Akash Puri	3:22
5.	"What Do You Want"	Bhaskarabhatla	Mangli, Krishna	3:19
6.	"Darling"	Bhaskarabhatla	Meghana Sai Sri	2:55
7.	"Nuvvu Nenu Ee Kshanam"	Puri Jagannadh	Chinmayi Sripaada	4:47
8.	"Peene Ke Baad (Kickass Version)"	Bhaskarabhatla, Puri Jagannadh	Sunil Kashyap	3:20
Total length:				29:03

== Release ==
The film was initially scheduled for a theatrical release on 29 May 2020 but it was postponed due to the COVID-19 pandemic. On 1 March 2021, new release date was announced as 18 June 2021. Later, it was postponed to 4 November 2021. Later, it was rescheduled to 29 October 2021.

== Reception ==
The Times of India critic Neeshitha Nyayapati called it " Puri's gangster version of Romeo & Juliet," rating the film 3 stars of 5. In her review for The Hindu, Y. Sunita Chowdhary felt Romantic was "voyeuristic drama at best." Murali Krishna CH of The New Indian Express criticized the writing, calling it an "assault on our senses."
