= Ramcharan =

Ramcharan (sometimes Ram Charan) is a given name and surname. People with this name include:

== Given name ==
- Ram Charan, Indian actor
- Ramcharan Chaudhari (Tharu), Nepalese politician
- Ram Charan Maharaj, Indian Hindu religious leader

== Surname ==
- Bertrand Ramcharan, Guyanese diplomat
- Rudy Ramcharan, Canadian curler
