= Puri Jagannadh Touring Talkies =

Indian film production company

- Company type: Private
- Industry: Entertainment
- Founded: Hyderabad, Telangana in 2013
- Founder: Puri Jagannadh
- Headquarters: Hyderabad, India
- Key people: Puri Jagannadh
- Products: Films
- Owner: Puri Jagannadh
- Parent: Puri Jagannadh
- Subsidiaries: Puri Sangeet; Vaishno Academy
- Website: http://purijagannadhtouringtalkies.com/

Puri Jagannadh Touring Talkies is an Indian film production company established by Tollywood director Puri Jagannadh. The company is based in Hyderabad.

== Film production ==
| Year | Title | Cast | Director | Notes | ref |
|---|---|---|---|---|---|
| 2014 | Heart Attack | Nithiin, Adah Sharma | Puri Jagannadh | | |
| 2018 | Mehbooba | Akash Puri, Neha Shetty | Puri Jagannadh | | |
| 2019 | iSmart Shankar | Ram Pothineni, Nidhi Agerwal, Nabha Natesh, Satyadev | Puri Jagannadh | | |
| 2021 | Romantic | Akash Puri, Ketika Sharma | Anil Paduri | | |
