= Loafer (2015 film) =

- Theatrical release poster
- Directed by: Puri Jagannadh
- Written by: Puri Jagannadh
- Produced by: C. Kalyan
- Starring: Varun Tej; Disha Patani; Revathi; Posani Krishna Murali
- Cinematography: P. G. Vinda
- Edited by: M. S. Rajashekhar Reddy (S. R. Shekhar)
- Music by: Sunil Kashyap
- Production companies: CK Entertainments; Sree Subha Swetha Films
- Release date: 17 December 2015
- Running time: 134 minutes
- Country: India
- Language: Telugu

Loafer is a 2015 Indian Telugu-language action drama film written and directed by Puri Jagannadh. It stars Varun Tej and Disha Patani (in her acting debut) while Revathi and Posani Krishna Murali appear in crucial supporting roles. The film was officially launched on 8 July 2015 in Hyderabad.

The film was released on 17 December 2015 on more than 750 screens across the globe and received mixed reviews from critics and eventually underperformed at the box office. It was later dubbed into Hindi under the title Loafer The Hero for direct telecast on Zee Cinema in 2016 and in Tamil under the same name.

== Plot ==
Murali and his wife Lakshmi Devi are a married couple deeply in love and the parents of Raja. After Murali demands money from Lakshmi Devi's parents, she separates from him. Murali then takes their son Raja and moves to Jodhpur, where they live as grifters. Meanwhile, Mouni, a young woman fleeing an unwanted marriage proposal, arrives in Jodhpur. Raja and Mouni fall in love, which leads Murali to reveal the whereabouts of Parijatam to her family.

== Cast ==
- Varun Tej as Raja
- Disha Patani as Mouni
- Revathi as Lakshmi Devi, Raja's mother
- Posani Krishna Murali as Murali, Raja's father
- Brahmanandam as Srimanthudu
- Mukesh Rishi as Mouni's father
- Ali as Spider Babu
- Charandeep Surineni as Rama; Mouni's brother who killed his own mother
- Pavitra Lokesh as Mouni's mother
- Shatru as Rama's Henchmen in Jodhpur
- Dhanraj as Raja's friend
- Sapthagiri as Raja's friend
- Uttej as Tourist at Jodhpur fort
- Sandeep Madhav as thief
- Nora Fatehi in a special appearance in the song "Nokkey Dochey"

== Music ==
Loafer

Soundtrack album by Sunil Kashyap
- Released: 7 December 2015
- Recorded: 2015
- Genre: Feature film soundtrack
- Language: Telugu
- Label: Aditya Music
- Producer: Sunil Kashyap

The official soundtrack of Loafer consisting of five songs was composed by Sunil Kashyap.

Track list
No.	Title	Lyrics	Artist(s)	Length
1.	"Nokkey Dochey"	Kandikonda	Sunil Kashyap, Spurthi
2.	"Nuvvedusthunte"	Bhaskara Bhatla	Yazin Nizar
3.	"Jiya Jale"	Bhaskara Bhatla	Yazin Nizar, Dhanunjay, Naresh Iyer, Pranavi
4.	"Suvvi Suvvalamma"	Suddala Ashok Teja	Karunya
5.	"Chutta Beedi"	Bhaskara Bhatla	Rahul, Sravana Bhargavi

== Reception ==
Pranita Jonnalagedda of The Times of India rated the 3.5 out of 5 and praised cinematography, and musical aspects. Suresh Kavirayani of Deccan Chronicle rated it 2.5 out of 5 and had a negative opinion towards Jagannadh's direction when compared to his previous works.
