= Sunil Kashyap =

- Origin: India
- Genres: Film score, World music
- Occupations: Film score composer, music director, Singer, actor, dancer
- Years active: 2008–present

Sunil Kashyap is an Indian film music composer, singer, and musician in Tollywood.

Sunil has sung the famous "Azeemo Shan Shehenshah" of A. R. Rahman's Jodhaa Akbar in the dubbed Telugu and Tamil versions.

== Early life and education ==
Nothing much about his childhood or early career is known since his lesser appearances in television interviews and musical functions. Sunil's mother tongue is actually Kannada but he is very familiar with Telugu, as he spent considerable time in Rayalaseema.

He is graduated from Sri Ramakrishna Degree College, Nandyal in Kurnool district .

Sunil came first in a talent show titled 'Ooh Laa Laa' on TV. AR Rehaman was the judge for the show. He has given music to "loafer", a popular Telugu film

Sunil was born in Andhra Pradesh and he spent all his childhood in Cement Nagar studied in St. Anns English Medium High School run by the Kerala nuns and later he studied his secondary school in Panyam Cements High School which is located in Kurnool District. His father was a Mechanical Engineer and he also familiar with music. His brother Anil Kashyap and sister Gayathri are singers, too.

== Discography ==
=== As composer ===
Year	Title	Language	Notes
2008	Gita	Telugu	
2009	Ninnu Kalisaka	Telugu	
2010	Sneha Geetham	Telugu	
2011	The Lotus Pond	English	
2011	Matrudevobhava	Telugu	
2011	It's My Love Story	Telugu	
2012	Vennela 1 1/2	Telugu	
2012	Login	Hindi	
2012	Ayyare	Telugu	
2013	Ullamellam Talladuthe	Telugu	
2013	Jagame Maya	Telugu	
2013	Back Bench Student	Telugu	
2014	Dil Kabaddi	Telugu	
2014	Romeo	Telugu	
2014	Chusinodiki Chusinantha	Telugu	
2015	Kavvintha	Telugu	
2015	Hyderabad Love Story	Telugu	
2015	Jyothi Lakshmi	Telugu	
2015	Mantra 2	Telugu	
2015	Loafer	Telugu	
2015	Om Mangalam Mangalam	Telugu	
2015	Oo Malli	Telugu	
2016	Yugam	Telugu	
2016	The Lotus Pond	Telugu	
2016	Oka Manasu	Telugu	
2017	Lakshmi Bomb	Telugu	
2017	Babu Baga Busy	Telugu	
2017	Rogue	Kannada; Telugu	
2018	Okate Life	Telugu	Background score only
2018	Bewars	Telugu	
2019	Kothaga Maa Prayanam	Telugu	Background score
2019	Pressure Cooker	Telugu	Two songs only
2021	Shaadi Mubarak	Telugu	
2021	Idhe Maa Katha	Telugu	
2021	Gem	Telugu	
2021	Maro Prasthanam	Telugu	
2021	Priyuraalu	Telugu	
2021	Romantic	Telugu	
2022	Kothala Raayudu	Telugu	
2022	Liger	Hindi; Telugu	
2023	Krishna Rama	Telugu	
2024	Srikakulam Sherlock Holmes	Telugu	
2025	Santhana Prapthirasthu	Telugu	

=== As a singer ===
Year	Film	Language	Song(s)
2009	Ninnu Kalisaka	Telugu	
2009	Junction	Telugu	
2010	Sneha Geetham	Telugu	
2011	Its My Love Story	Telugu	
2011	Katha Screenplay Darsakatvam Appalaraju	Telugu	
2011	Vykuntapali	Telugu	
2011	Mr.Rascal	Telugu	
2012	All The Best	Telugu	
2012	Login	Hindi	
2012	Ayyare	Telugu	
2013	Love Touc	Telugu	
2013	Naa Style Naade	Telugu	
2013	Back Bench Student	Telugu	
2014	Rosham	Telugu	
2014	Romeo	Telugu	
2014	Madhura Meenakshi	Telugu	
2016	The Lotus Pond	Telugu	
2021	Maro Prasthanam	Telugu	"Sunyame"
2022	Kothala Raayudu	Telugu	"O Thalapai"
2025	Andondittu Kaala	Kannada	"Maharaja Agendu"
