= Sri Sravanthi Movies =

Telugu film production company

- Type: Private
- Industry: Entertainment
- Founded: Hyderabad, India
- Founder: Sravanthi Ravi Kishore
- Headquarters: Hyderabad, India
- Key people: Sravanthi Ravi Kishore
- Products: Films
- Services: Film production
- Owner: Sravanthi Ravi Kishore

Sri Sravanthi Movies is an Indian film production company established by Sravanthi Ravi Kishore and located in Hyderabad. It is one of India's largest film production companies with over 30 years of contribution to Telugu cinema. The first film was Ladies Tailor (1986) with Rajendra Prasad. The production company is mainly known for its collaborations with Vamsy and K. Vijaya Bhaskar.

== Film production ==
Key
†	Denotes films that have not yet been released

Year	Film	Actors	Notes
1986	Ladies Tailor	Rajendra Prasad, Archana	
1987	Sri Kanakamalaxmi Recording Dance Troupe	Naresh, Madhuri	
1987	Maharshi	Maharshi Raghava, Shantipriya	
1988	Varasudochhadu	Daggubati Venkatesh, Suhasini Maniratnam	
1991	Jaitra Yatra	Nagarjuna, Vijayashanti	
1991	April 1 Vidudala	Rajendra Prasad, Shobana	
1992	Balarama Krishnulu	Sobhan Babu, Rajasekhar Jagapati Babu Ramya Krishnan	
1993	Rowdy Mogudu	Mohan Babu, Brahmanandam	
1995	Lingababu Love Story	Rajendra Prasad, Rajasri	
1996	Maavichiguru	Jagapati Babu, Aamani, Ranjitha	
1997	Egire Paavurama	Srikanth, J. D. Chakravarthy, Laila Mehdin	
1998	Gilli Kajjalu	Srikanth, Meena, Raasi (actress)	
1999	Pilla Nachindi	Srikanth, Sanghavi, Rachana Banerjee	
1999	Manasulo Maata	Jagapati Babu, Srikanth, Mahima Chaudhry	
2000	Nuvve Kavali	Tarun Kumar, Richa Pallod	In association with Ramoji Rao; Won National award
2001	Nuvvu Naaku Nachav	Daggubati Venkatesh, Aarthi Agarwal	Winner of five State Awards and a Nandi Award
2002	Nuvve Nuvve	Tarun Kumar, Shriya Saran	
2003	Ela Cheppanu	Tarun Kumar, Shriya Saran	
2004	Gowri	Sumanth, Charmy Kaur	
2004	Yuvasena	Bharath, Sharwanand, Gopika	
2006	Premante Inte	Navdeep, Poonam Bajwa	
2007	Classmates	Sumanth, Sadha	
2008	Ready	Ram Pothineni, Genelia D'Souza	
2009	Ganesh Just Ganesh	Ram Pothineni, Kajal Aggarwal	
2012	Endukante... Premanta!	Ram Pothineni, Tamannaah	
2013	Masala	Ram Pothineni, Venkatesh	
2015	Shivam	Ram Pothineni, Raashi Khanna	
2016	Nenu Sailaja	Ram Pothineni, Keerthy Suresh	
2017	Vunnadhi Okate Zindagi	Ram Pothineni, Anupama Parameswaran, Lavanya Tripathi	Presenter
2021	RED	Ram Pothineni, Nivetha Pethuraj, Malvika Sharma, Amritha Aiyer	
2023	Kida	Kaali Venkat, Poo Ramu	Tamil film
