= Sravanthi Ravi Kishore =

Indian film producer

- Born: Vijayawada, Andhra Pradesh, India
- Occupation: Film producer
- Relatives: Ram Pothineni (nephew)

Sravanthi Ravi Kishore is an Indian film producer known for his works in Telugu cinema. He owns the film production company "Sri Sravanthi Movies", known for presenting hit romantic comedy films. Red was his 30th film production venture, while he had also dubbed 4 films from Tamil into Telugu. He won Nandi Award for Second Best Feature Film - Silver for Nuvve Nuvve (2002)

== Filmography ==
As producer

Year	Film	Notes
1986	Ladies Tailor	
1987	Maharshi	
1987	Pushpaka Vimanam	
1987	Nayakudu	Tamil dubbed Nayakan
1988	Varasudochhadu	
1988	Sister Nandini	Tamil dubbed Manathil Urudhi Vendum
1989	Chal Chal Gurramm	Malayalam dubbed
1991	Jaitra Yatra	
1992	Balarama Krishnulu	Presenter
1993	Rowdy Mogudu	
1995	Lingababu Love Story	
1996	Maavichiguru	Presenter
1997	Egire Paavurama	Presenter
1998	Gillikajjalu Presenter	
1999	Pilla Nachindi Presenter	
1999	Manasulo Maata Presenter	
2000	Nuvve Kavali	Associate Producer
2001	Nuvvu Naaku Nachav	
2002	Nuvve Nuvve	
2003	Ela Cheppanu	
2004	Gowri	
2004	Yuvasena	
2006	Premante Inte	
2007	Classmates	
2008	Ready	
2009	Ganesh Just Ganesh	
2012	Endukante... Premanta!	
2013	Masala	
2014	Raghuvaran B.Tech	Tamil VIP Dubbed. Producer
2015	Shivam	
2016	Nenu Sailaja	
2017	Vunnadhi Okate Zindagi	presenter
2021	Red	
2023	Kida	Tamil film
