= Ongole Gittha =

2013 Indian film by Bhaskar

- Theatrical release poster
- Directed by: Bhaskar
- Written by: Bhaskar
- Produced by: B. V. S. N. Prasad
- Starring: Ram Pothineni; Kriti Kharbanda; Prakash Raj
- Cinematography: Venkatesh Anguraj
- Edited by: Marthand K. Venkatesh
- Music by: Songs: G. V. Prakash Kumar; Mani Sharma; Score: Mani Sharma
- Production company: Sri Venkateswara Cine Chitra
- Release date: 1 February 2013
- Country: India
- Language: Telugu

Ongole Gittha (transl. The Bull of Ongole) is a 2013 Indian Telugu-language action comedy film written and directed by Bhaskar and produced by B. V. S. N. Prasad under Sri Venkateswara Cine Chitra. The film stars Ram Pothineni and Kriti Kharbanda. The soundtrack was composed by G. V. Prakash Kumar, Mani Sharma also scored one song for the film and given the background score. The film was released on 1 February 2013 to negative reviews from critics and commercial failure at the box office. The film was later dubbed into Hindi as Mahaveer No. 1 in 2014 and in Tamil as Kaariyaavadhi.

== Plot ==
The film opens with Narayana and his son escaping from a gangster Durga, who intends to kill them. The film then shifts to 2001, where a young boy named White, an orphan, enters the Ongole market. He manages to catch the attention of many people, including the market chairman Adikeshavulu, who is god to the people of the market with his tactical ways of business, and establishes him as a businessman there.

Years later, White, still a leading merchant in the market, owns four shops. On the inaugural event of his fourth shop, he meets Sandhya a.k.a. Sandy, Adikeshavulu's daughter, and falls for her. The MLA wants to buy the market so he can shift it to a land on the outskirts of the city. During this, it is also revealed that Adikeshavulu is not a good person but is pretending to be one. Whenever he returns home after difficulty pretending to be a good person, he stands in front of the mirror and removes his clothes. Out of anger for Adikeshavulu not giving him the market, the MLA makes White the market chairman. Adikeshavulu beats the MLA and makes him announce the former as the chairman. White agrees on the condition that Sandy must marry him. Out of greed for the market, Adikeshavulu agrees and gets White and Sandy engaged.

On the night after their engagement, White goes to Sandy's house to meet her, but she escapes from him, reaches outside the house with her grandmother and mother, and complains about White. Just then, Adikeshavulu comes in drunk but controlled. White understands and leaves, but his father-like business partner, in a drunk mode, reveals that White has a father who lives in Tripura. Adikeshavulu uses this information and sends Durga to find White's father, but at Tripura, Durga bumps into White while trying to kill an old enemy. It is now revealed that the 'old enemy' is White's father and White's real name is Dorababu. White's partner finds out and blames White for being the son of the person who murdered his family.

It is now that White reveals his past. Years back, Narayana used to be the chairman of the Ongole market. Adikeshavulu was the son of another man, who envied Narayana and wanted his post. The man commits suicide as he could not get the post. Taking pity, Narayana appoints Adikeshavulu as his man, and the market continues to prosper with Adikeshavulu pretending to be good. One day, Adikeshavulu started collecting money from the sellers as the funds for building a shelter and giving food to the sellers were insufficient. Narayana comes there, stops Adikeshavulu, and tells him that he will give the money. Another man in the market who envies Narayana blames him for acting in front of the people and accuses him of telling Adikeshavulu to collect the money. However, nobody believes him and continues to trust Adikeshavulu. Adikeshavulu kills the man along with Durga, and it is revealed that it was he who killed his brother. White (Dorababu) now decides to take revenge.

Adikeshavulu kidnaps Narayana, puts him in a sack in the market, and burns the market to ashes so he will get the insurance as profit. The market is burnt that night, but White comes to save it and chases Adikeshavulu into the announcement office. There, Adikeshavulu reveals everything about himself, including the fact that he was the one who killed his brother, which White accidentally catches on the announcement microphone. Everybody outside hears everything and charges at Adikeshavulu, who ends up being injured by their beatings. The people welcome Narayana back in the market, and he gets his post as market president back, while Adikeshavulu acts like a mad person to escape from the angry people.

== Cast ==
- Ram Pothineni as White/Dorababu
- Kriti Kharbanda as Sandhya/Sandy
- Prakash Raj as Adikeshavulu
- Prabhu as Narayana/Bangarraju
- Ajay as Adikeshavulu's brother, Durga
- Abhimanyu Singh as Mangababu
- Ali as Cheddodu
- Ahuti Prasad as MLA
- Rama Prabha as Sandhya's grandmother
- Jaya Prakash Reddy as Adikeshavulu's father, Chennakesavulu
- Sanjay Reddy as CEO
- Kishore Das as Pavuram
- Praveen as MLA's PA
- Raghu Babu as Karri Neelakantam
- Sapthagiri as Barber 'Gaatu' Sathi
- Satya as Nicholas
- Meena Vasu as Dorababu's mother

== Production ==
=== Casting ===
In February 2012, Bhaskar approached Tamil actor Karthi, who was not able to give his dates. Later, Bhaskar approached Allu Arjun, and finally Ram Pothineni took up the offer. A. Venkatesh was chosen as the film's cinematographer, while G. V. Prakash Kumar agreed to compose the film's background score and soundtrack. Initially the model turned actress Shubha Phutela was selected to share screen space with Ram. She has encountered health problems after shooting for the first schedule in the Guntur mirchi yard. She died due to her illness, and her role was passed on. Later Kriti Kharbanda was selected for her role. Prakash Raj, Abhimanyu Singh, Brahmanandam, Ahuti Prasad, Ajay, Raghu Babu, Rama Prabha, Kishore Das are playing other roles in this film.

=== Filming ===
The team completed the first schedule in Guntur. The film unit shot for more than 45 days in this schedule and filmed important scenes and a couple of action episodes at Guntur market yard. The second schedule of the film took place in Tanuku from July first week. The film has been disrupted due to the heavy rains by Nilam cyclone effect.

== Soundtrack ==
Ongole Githa

Soundtrack album to Ongole Githa by G. V. Prakash Kumar
- Released: 16 January 2013
- Recorded: 2012–2013
- Genre: Feature film soundtrack
- Length: 21:51
- Language: Telugu
- Label: Aditya Music
- Producers: G. V. Prakash Kumar; Mani Sharma

G. V. Prakash Kumar chronology
Naan Rajavaga Pogiren (2012)	Ongole Githa (2013)	Annakodi (2013)

The music is composed by G. V. Prakash Kumar who worked with Bhaskar for the first time in his career and had also composed the music for Ram's earlier film Endukante... Premanta!. Mani Sharma has also scored one song for the film and given the background score. The audio launch was held on 16 January 2013 at Annapurna Studios, Hyderabad. S. S. Rajamouli attended the audio launch function as chief guest and released the audio CD and several others like Ali, Kona Venkat, Vanamali, Bhaskarabhatla, Sravanthi Ravi Kishore graced the event.

Tracklist
No.	Title	Lyrics	Music	Singer(s)	Length
1.	"Yerra Mirapallo"	Vanamali	G. V. Prakash Kumar	Shankar Mahadevan	3:45
2.	"Raa Chilakaa"	Vanamali	G. V. Prakash Kumar	G. V. Prakash Kumar	4:30
3.	"Chal Challe"	Bhaskarabhatla	Mani Sharma	Narendra, Sahithi	4:24
4.	"Ye Pilla"	Vanamali	G. V. Prakash Kumar	Ranjith	4:33
5.	"Mama Maraju"	Vanamali	G. V. Prakash Kumar	Jai Srinivas, John, Gopal, Mouli, Ravi	4:39
6.	"Silk Smitha Gurthochhe" (Unreleased/Theatrical version)	Kedarnath Parimi	G. V. Prakash Kumar	Uncredited	5:00
Total length:					21:51

== Release ==
Ongole Githa was awarded an A Certificate by the Censor Board due to nude scenes of Prakash Raj. After getting negative feedback about the scenes on day 1, the producer and creative think-tank took a collective decision to remove these scenes from the film.

=== Critical reception ===
The film received mixed reviews from critics. Apglitz gave a rating of 2.25/5, criticizing the outdated script, poor direction, and screenplay. Mahesh S Koneru of 123Telugu gave 2.5/5, saying that Ram's energy levels, Prakash Raj's performance, and Kriti Kharbandha's beauty are the sole redeeming factors. Supergoodmovies wrote, "The first half an hour gives an interesting feel of the movie and but it impresses you with a few romantic songs, fights and comedy. Second half of the film goes into flashback mode. But the story gets struck in the second half with exhausted narration".

== Box office ==
Ongole Githa was reported to collect around ₹14.6 crore (US$1.5 million) in 17 days. Producers were later arrested by the Moral Police of Andhra Pradesh for fake collections.
