= Gowri (2004 film) =

- Directed by: B. V. Ramana
- Written by: B. V. Ramana
- Story by: Ramana
- Based on: Thirumalai (Tamil)
- Produced by: Sravanthi Ravi Kishore
- Starring: Sumanth; Charmme Kaur; Atul Kulkarni
- Cinematography: Hari Anumolu
- Edited by: A. Sreekar Prasad
- Music by: Koti (songs); Vidyasagar (score, uncredited) (reused from Thirumalai)
- Production company: Sri Sravanthi Movies
- Distributed by: Sri Sravanthi Movies
- Release date: 3 September 2004
- Running time: 169 minutes
- Country: India
- Language: Telugu

Gowri (Telugu: గౌరి) is a 2004 Indian Telugu-language action film directed by B. V. Ramana. It stars Sumanth and Charmme Kaur in the lead roles, and was produced by Sravanthi Ravi Kishore. It is a remake of the 2003 Tamil film Thirumalai, starring Vijay and Jyothika. It received positive reviews and was a hit at the box office. The film was later dubbed into Hindi under the title The Gunda.

== Plot ==
Gowri is an orphaned motorcycle mechanic living in Dhoolpet, Hyderabad. Shweta is the daughter of a media mogul, Chandra Shekhar. Gowri and Shweta fall in love with each other to the disapproval of Chandra Shekhar, who seeks the help of a mafia leader Sarkar to separate them. Gowri eventually overcomes Sarkar and convinces Chandra Shekhar to accept him.

== Cast ==
- Sumanth as Gowri Shankar
- Charmy Kaur as Shweta
- Brahmanandam as Padmasri
- Atul Kulkarni as Sarkar
- Vizag Prasad as Chandra Shekhar
- Jyoti as Chitra
- Pavala Shyamala as Chitra's paternal aunt
- Naresh as Raghu
- Kousalya as Nagalakshmi, Raghu's wife
- Sharwanand as Krishna, Gowri Shankar's friend
- Narra Venkateswara Rao as former Home Minister
- Ahuti Prasad
- Tanikella Bharani
- Chalapathi Rao as current Home Minister
- Venu Madhav as Interviewee
- Srinivasa Reddy as Gowri Shankar's friend
- Banerjee as Anthony, Sarkar's henchman
- Chitram Srinu as Gowri Shankar's friend
- Peter Hein
- Raghu Babu as Sarkar's henchman
- Mansi Pritam (special appearance in the song "Jigi Jigi Jinka")

== Production ==
Sravanthi Ravikishore bought the remake rights of Tamil film Thirumalai and chosen Sumanth and Charmi as leading pair. The muhurat took place on 21 March 2004 at Annapurna Studios. The song "Jigi Jigi Jinka" was shot at Annapurna Studios in July. Sumanth is playing the role of a mechanic in Dhoolpet while Charmy Kaur is playing the role of a fashion designing student.

== Soundtrack ==
The soundtrack was composed by Koti and released by Aditya Music. All lyrics were written by Sirivennela Seetharama Sastry. The audio launch function was held at Annapurna Studios on 11 August 2004 with Akkineni Nageswara Rao, Nagarjuna, S. V. Krishna Reddy, D. Suresh Babu, K. Vijaya Bhaskar and Shriya Saran in attendance.

Gowri

Soundtrack album by Koti
- Released: 11 August 2004
- Recorded: 2004
- Genre: Soundtrack
- Length: 28:24
- Label: Aditya Music
- Producer: Koti

Koti chronology
| Vijayendra Varma (2004) | Gowri (2004) | Rowdy Aliya (2004) |

Track list
| No. | Title | Singer(s) | Length |
|---|---|---|---|
| 1. | "Em Manthram" | Koti, Nitya Santhoshini | 4:47 |
| 2. | "Gundello Gudiganta" | Mallikarjun, Usha | 4:20 |
| 3. | "Enado Jarigina" | Mano | 4:57 |
| 4. | "Jigi Jigi Jinka" | Ravi Varma, Smita | 4:51 |
| 5. | "Nemmadi Nemmadi" | Sandeep, Sunitha | 4:29 |
| 6. | "Mudhosthundhi" | Venu, Nitya Santhoshini | 5:00 |
| Total length: | | | 28:24 |

== Reception ==
A critic from Sify wrote, "The film is technically tacky and is another narcissistic enterprise for its hero".
