= Ram Pothineni =

Indian actor (born 1988)

- Pothineni in 2020
- Born: 15 May 1988 (age 38); Hyderabad, Telangana India
- Other names: Ustaad, Energetic Star, RAPO
- Occupations: Actor & Director
- Years active: 2006–present
- Relatives: Sravanthi Ravi Kishore (uncle); Sharwanand (cousin)

Pothineni Seetha Ram Chowdary, also known as Ram Pothineni (born 15 May 1988) is an Indian actor who works in Telugu Cinema. He has earned one Filmfare Award and one SIIMA Award for his work.

Pothineni made his acting debut with the box office success Devadasu (2006), for which he won the Filmfare Award for Best Male Debut – South. He achieved his breakthrough in 2008 with the action comedy Ready (2008). Pothineni continued to establish himself as a leading man with critical and commercial successes such as Maska (2009), Kandireega (2011), Pandaga Chesko (2015), Nenu Sailaja (2016), Hello Guru Prema Kosame (2018) and iSmart Shankar (2019).

== Early life ==
Ram Pothineni was born as Pothineni Seetha Ram Chowdary on 15 May 1988, in Hyderabad, to Murali Pothineni. He is the nephew of Telugu film producer, Sravanthi Ravi Kishore. Actor Sharwanand is his cousin. His family is from Vijayawada, Andhra Pradesh.

== Career ==
=== Debut and early career (2006–2010) ===
Pothineni first appeared with his theatrical debut in 2006 with Devadasu. His second film, Jagadam opposite Isha Sahani was directed by Sukumar. He then appeared in Ready alongside Genelia D'Souza directed by Srinu Vaitla which was a commercial success. In 2009, he had two releases, Maska and Ganesh.

In 2010, Pothineni had only one release, Rama Rama Krishna Krishna, produced by Dil Raju and directed by Sriwass.

=== Career ups and downs (2011–2016) ===
Pothineni's next film was Kandireega (2011). Later he starred in Endukante... Premanta! (2012) alongside Tamannaah, directed by Karunakaran and produced by Sravanthi Ravi Kishore. In 2013, Pothineni appeared in Ongole Githa with Kriti Kharbanda directed by Bhaskar and produced by B.V.S.N. Prasad. In the same year, he co-starred alongside Venkatesh in the action comedy Masala, the remake of the Hindi film Bol Bachchan, directed by K. Vijaya Bhaskar and jointly produced by Sravanthi Ravi Kishore and D. Suresh Babu.

In 2015, Pothineni starred in two films, Pandaga Chesko and Shivam . While Pandaga Chesko directed by Gopichand Malineni, was a commercial success, Shivam ended up as one of the biggest failures of his career.

In 2016, He had two releases, both produced by his own production house Sri Sravanthi Movies, Nenu Sailaja which was a commercial success and Santosh Srinivas-directed Hyper which was an average at the box office.

=== 2017–present: Career fluctuations and decline ===
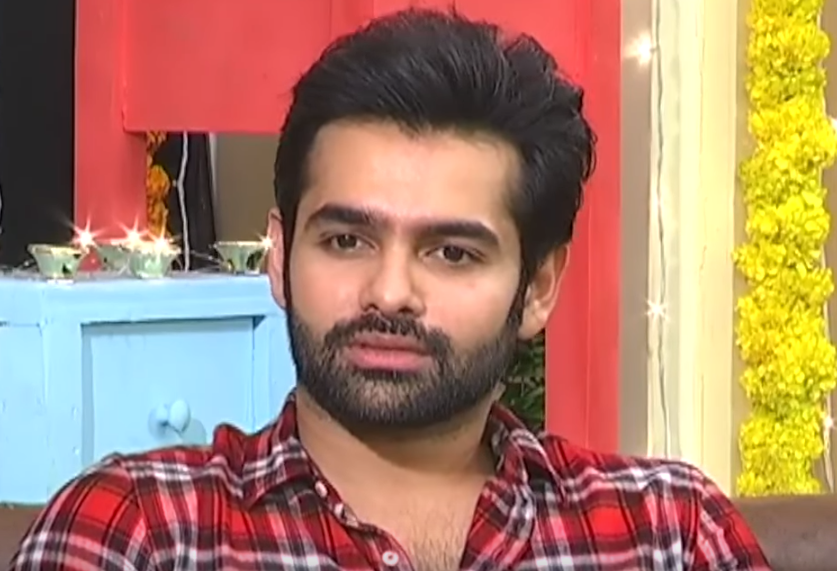
Pothineni in 2017

His 2017 coming-of-age film Vunnadhi Okate Zindagi received mixed reviews. In 2018, he starred in the romantic comedy Hello Guru Prema Kosame directed by Trinadha Rao Nakkina. In 2019, he collaborated with director Puri Jagannadh for the action thriller iSmart Shankar. The film became a commercial success for Pothineni after a series of failures. It grossed over ₹90 crore, his career's highest grosser. His 2021 film was Red where he played a dual role, is a remake of Tamil film Thadam (2018). In 2022, he starred in the Lingusamy-directed The Warriorr where he played a police officer. The film received negative reviews from critics and was huge commercial failure.

He then starred in Skanda (2023) directed by Boyapati Sreenu. It opened to mixed-to-negative reviews from both the critics and audience, alike. It became the most-trolled Telugu film of its time and was prone to generation of multiple memes for its action sequences and dialogues. He next starred in the sequel to iSmart Shankar, Double iSmart, which released in 2024 to negative reviews. Unlike the prequel, it was highly thrashed by both the critics and audience, alike. It became his third consecutive box-office disaster.

He attempted to delineate himself from the commercial trappings of Telugu cinema, and starred in the romantic drama, Andhra King Taluka (2025), directed by Mahesh Babu Pachigolla of Miss Shetty Mr Polishetty (2023) fame. It opened to mixed reviews from the critics and audience, alike. Though his attempt to differentiate himself was lauded, the film ultimately ended up as an average grosser.

In May 2026, his newly formed production house by his brother, Krishna, and himself, RAPO Cinematics, announced his directorial RAPO23, a sci-fi psychological thriller. It was written and is being directed by himself.

== Media image ==
Pothineni has featured on Hyderabad Times Most Desirable Men list various times. He ranked 11th in 2017, 11th in 2018, 3rd in 2019 and 2nd in 2020. Pothineni did his first ever brand endorsement for Garnier alongside John Abraham.

== Filmography ==
=== As actor ===
Key
†	Denotes films that have not yet been released

- All films are in Telugu, unless otherwise noted.

Year	Title	Role(s)	Notes	Ref.
2006	Devadasu	Devadas		
2007	Jagadam	Seenu		
2008	Ready	Chandu (Danayya) (Note: Pothineni played a single character with two or more names.)		
2009	Maska	Krishna "Krish"		
2009	Ganesh	Ganesh		
2010	Rama Rama Krishna Krishna	Rama Krishna		
2011	Kandireega	Srinivas "Sreenu"		
2012	Endukante... Premanta!	Krishna & Ram (Note: Pothineni played two characters.)	Dual role	
2013	Ongole Githa	Dorababu (White)		
2013	Masala	Ram (Rehman)		
2015	Rey	Narrator	Voice role	
2015	Pandaga Chesko	Karthik		
2015	Shivam	Shiva (Ram)		
2016	Nenu Sailaja	Hari		
2016	Hyper	Suryanarayana Murthy		
2017	Vunnadhi Okate Zindagi	Abhiram		
2018	Hello Guru Prema Kosame	Sanju	Also singer for "Idea Cheppu Friendu"	
2019	iSmart Shankar	Ustaad "iSmart" Shankar / Arun (Note: Pothineni played a single character with two different personalities.)		
2021	Red	Aditya & Siddharth	Dual role	
2021	Romantic	Himself	Cameo appearance in the song "Peene Ke Baad"	
2022	The Warriorr	Satya	Telugu-Tamil bilingual film	
2023	Skanda	Bhaskar Raju & Skanda	Dual role	
2024	Double iSmart	Ustaad "iSmart" Shankar		
2025	Andhra King Taluka	Sagar	Also lyricist and playback singer	
2027	Dharman †	TBA	Tamil film; Filming	
2027	RAPO23 †	Veera	Directorial debut	

== Accolades ==
Year	Award	Category	Work	Result	Ref.
2002	Europe Film Festival, Switzerland	Best Actor	Adayaalam	Won	
2007	Filmfare Awards South	Best Male Debut	Devadasu	Won	
2008	Filmfare Awards South	Best Actor – Telugu	Ready	Nominated	
2011	Filmfare Awards South	Best Actor – Telugu	Kandireega	Nominated	
2020	Zee Cine Awards Telugu	Sensational Star of the Year	iSmart Shankar	Won	
2020	Zee Cine Awards Telugu	Best Actor	iSmart Shankar	Nominated	
2021	10th South Indian International Movie Awards	Best Actor	iSmart Shankar	Nominated	

== See also ==
- List of Indian male film actors
- List of dancers
