= Ganesh (2009 film) =

2009 Telugu film directed by M. Saravanan

Ganesh... just Ganesh
- Film poster
- Directed by: M. Saravanan
- Written by: M. Saravanan; Abburi Ravi (dialogues)
- Produced by: Sravanthi Ravi Kishore
- Starring: Ram Pothineni; Kajal Aggarwal; Poonam Kaur
- Cinematography: Hari Anumolu
- Edited by: A. Sreekar Prasad
- Music by: Mickey J Meyer
- Production company: Sri Sravanthi Movies
- Release date: 24 September 2009
- Running time: 173 minutes
- Country: India
- Language: Telugu

Ganesh ... just Ganesh is a 2009 Indian Telugu-language romantic drama action film written and directed by M. Saravanan in his directorial debut and produced by Sri Sravanthi Movies. It stars Ram Pothineni as the title character alongside Kajal Aggarwal and Poonam Kaur. The film also features 26 kids and comedian Brahmanandam.

Ganesh began its production in December 2008 and ended in August 2009. The film features music by Mickey J. Meyer while cinematography and editing are performed by Hari Anumolu and A. Sreekar Prasad respectively. The film was theatrically released on 24 September 2009.

== Plot ==
Ganesh is an orphan who works at a software company and is known for always helping people, even in dangerous situations like pulling a child away from a speeding car. When his best friend falls in love with the companion of Divya, the daughter of a strict politician, Ganesh agrees to pretend he is romantically interested in Divya so his friend can pursue his own relationship without family interference.

To stay close to Divya, Ganesh moves into her apartment complex and quickly becomes a favorite of the 26 children who live there. They treat him like a superhero, rope him into their playful schemes, and add comic relief with daring stunts and mischievous demands. Their antics and Ganesh’s good-natured responses bring lightness to the story.

Divya eventually learns the relationship was a ruse arranged for Ganesh’s friend and feels deeply betrayed. Her anger strains her family’s reputation and turns them against Ganesh. At the same time, Ganesh begins to develop real feelings for Divya and faces a new threat from Mahadev, a violent local thug who terrorizes the neighborhood and pressures Divya’s family over unpaid debts. A bumbling local don named Yadagiri provides further comic moments with his one-liners and clumsy interventions.

The story builds to a tense confrontation in which Ganesh risks everything to stop Mahadev, rescue those in danger, and prove his sincerity. His courage and sacrifice soften Divya’s anger, convince her of his true devotion, and lead to reconciliation and a peaceful resolution.

== Cast ==
- Ram Pothineni as Ganesh
- Kajal Aggarwal as Divya
- Poonam Kaur as Deepa
- Ashish Vidyarthi as Mahadev
- Brahmanandam as Yadagiri
- Rashmi Gautam as Archana
- Giri Babu as Rama Chandra Murthy, Ganesh's father
- Chandra Mohan as Chandram, Divya's father
- Sumithra as Lakshmi, Ganesh's mother
- Sudha as Savitri, Divya's mother
- Rohini Hattangadi as Kasturi Venkataraman, Divya's aunt
- Y. Kasi Viswanath as Srinivas, Divya's uncle
- Sameer as Aravind, Divya's brother
- Surekha Vani as Divya's sister-in-law
- Fish Venkat as Mahadev's henchman
- Saptagiri as Apparao
- Ravi Prakash as Prakash
- Rajitha

== Production and release ==
The film began its production in December 2008, and ended in August 2009. Ganesh released theatrically on 24 September 2009.

The film was later dubbed into Hindi as Kshatriya: Ek Yoddha in 2011.

== Soundtrack ==
Ganesh Just Ganesh

Soundtrack album by Mickey J Meyer
- Released: 10 September 2009
- Recorded: 2009
- Genre: Film soundtrack
- Length: 28:00
- Label: Aditya Music
- Producer: Mickey J Meyer

Mickey J Meyer chronology
Cheluvina Chilipili (2009)	Ganesh Just Ganesh (2009)	Leader (2010)

The soundtrack of the film was released on 10 September 2009. It had music scored by composer, Mickey J Meyer. Lyrics have been written by Ramajogaiah Sastri. The music was launched at Rama Naidu studios by Jr. NTR.

Track-List
No.	Title	Lyrics	Artist(s)	Length
1.	"Thanemando"	Sirivennela Seetharama Sastry	Javed Ali	4:15
2.	"Lalla Lai"	Ramajogayya Sastry	Krishna Chaitanya, Shweta Pandit	4:42
3.	"Yele Yele"	Ramajogayya Sastry	Srimathumitha	4:43
4.	"Raja Kumari"	Ramajogayya Sastry	Kunal Ganjawala, Srimathumitha	4:36
5.	"Chalo Chalore"	Ramajogayya Sastry	Karthik & Kids Chorus	4:53
6.	"Raja Maharaja"	Ramajogayya Sastry	Ranjith	4:51
Total length:				28:00

== Reviews ==
Radhika Rajamani of Rediff.com called it a "fun" film and wrote: "This movie harks back to the days of good ol' movies like The Sound of Music." On performances, 123telugu.com stated: "Ram is the main attraction of the movie and he delivers a sincere performance as Ganesh.” Idlebrain gave the film 3 out of 5 stars and wrote "First half of the movie is adequate. The second half lacks pace. The climax should have been shot interestingly. Plus points of the movie are Ram and kids. Negative points are screenplay and slow second half. Stories of this type needs tremendous creativity and presentation ability from director. The runtime of the movie is around 3 hours and it seriously needs some trimming in the second half. The lifeline of the movie is the kids episode. Ganesh is not the movie for morning show crowds. It is a clean movie aimed at family crowds".
