= Abburi Ravi =

Indian screenwriter

- Born: Bhimavaram, Andhra Pradesh, India
- Education: Nagarjuna University
- Occupation: Screenwriter
- Years active: 2001–present

Abburi Ravi is an Indian screenwriter who works in Telugu films. He received Nandi Award for Best Dialogue Writer for Bommarillu (2006).

== Early life ==
Ravi was born and brought up in Bhimavaram, Andhra Pradesh. He graduated in BSc from graduated DNR College, Bhimavaram. After completed Master of Business Administration from Nagarjuna University, he started working in an advertising agency.

In 2001, director Trivikram Srinivas who was a classmate of him offered Ravi to work as an assistant director. Ravi obliged and worked for Nuvve Nuvve (2001). which began his film career.

== Filmography ==
=== As dialogue writer ===
Year	Title	Notes
2003	Ela Cheppanu	
2004	Pallakilo Pellikoothuru	
2005	Bhageeratha	
2006	Bommarillu	
2006	Annavaram	
2007	Classmates	
2007	Athidhi	
2007	Don	
2008	Bhale Dongalu	
2009	Konchem Ishtam Konchem Kashtam	
2009	Kick	
2009	Ganesh	
2011	Kudirithe Kappu Coffee	
2011	Mr.Perfect	
2011	Veera	
2011	Dhada	
2011	Panjaa	
2012	Snehithudu	Dubbed version of Nanban
2014	Yevadu	
2015	Kerintha	
2015	Tiger	
2015	Cheekati Rajyam	Also actor
2016	Kshanam	Also screenplay guidance
2016	Oopiri	
2016	Hyper	
2016	Ekkadiki Pothavu Chinnavada	
2017	Winner	
2017	Yuddham Sharanam	
2017	Raju Gari Gadhi 2	
2017	Okka Kshanam	
2018	Goodachari	Also screenplay guidance
2019	Evaru	Also screenplay guidance
2019	Chanakya	
2019	Operation Gold Fish	
2019	Iddari Lokam Okate	
2020	Disco Raja	
2021	Naandhi	
2022	Ghani	
2022	Major	Also screenplay guidance
2022	Itlu Maredumilli Prajaneekam	
2023	Ugram	
2023	Custody	
2026	Dacoit	Also screenplay guidance
