= Masala (2013 film) =

2013 film directed by K. Vijaya Bhaskar

- Theatrical release poster
- Directed by: K. Vijaya Bhaskar
- Screenplay by: K. Vijaya Bhaskar
- Dialogues by: Anil Ravipudi
- Story by: Rohit Shetty
- Based on: Bol Bachchan by Rohit Shetty
- Produced by: D. Suresh Babu; Sravanthi Ravi Kishore
- Starring: Venkatesh; Ram Pothineni; Anjali; Shazahn Padamsee
- Cinematography: I. Andrew
- Edited by: M. R. Varma
- Music by: S. Thaman
- Production companies: Suresh Productions; Sri Sravanthi Movies
- Distributed by: Suresh Productions
- Release date: 14 November 2013
- Running time: 140 minutes
- Country: India
- Language: Telugu

Masala is a 2013 Indian Telugu-language action comedy film written and directed by K. Vijaya Bhaskar. It is produced by D. Suresh Babu and Sravanthi Ravi Kishore under the Suresh Productions and Sri Sravanthi Movies banners. The film stars Venkatesh, Ram Pothineni, Anjali and Shazahn Padamsee with music composed by S. Thaman. It is a remake of the 2012 Hindi film Bol Bachchan The film released worldwide on 14 November 2013. Upon release, the film received mixed reviews from critics with appreciation to the cast performances.

== Cast ==
- Venkatesh as Veera Venkata Raja Narasimha Balaram
- Ram Pothineni as Rehman/ Ram (Fake Name)
- Anjali as Sania / Sarita / Savitri (in portrait)
- Jaya Prakash Reddy as Eddulu Kameshwar Rao
- Shazahn Padamsee as Meenakshi
- M. S. Narayana as Narayana Rao
- Kovai Sarala as Anjali Devi / Chintamani
- Ali as Suri
- Posani Krishna Murali as Nagaraju
- Suman Shetty as Suri's drama mate
- Master Bharath as Suri's friend
- Venu Madhav as Census officer
- Brahmanandam
- Ramjagan as Advocate
- Jenny as Doctor
- Kadambari Kiran as P. Shyam Babu
- Ananth Babu as Doctor
- Vizag Prasad as Judge
- Harsha Chemudu

== Soundtrack ==
Masala

Soundtrack album by S. Thaman
- Released: 13 Oct 2013
- Recorded: 2013
- Genre: Feature film soundtrack
- Length: 19:12
- Language: Telugu
- Labels: Aditya Music, Muzik 247
- Producer: S. Thaman

S. Thaman chronology
Ramayya Vasthavayya (2013)	Masala (2013)	All in All Azhagu Raja (2013)

Music composed by S. Thaman. Lyrics were written by Ramajogayya Sastry. The music released on ADITYA Music Company. The Music received a positive response from both critics and audience alike.

Track listing
No.	Title	Artist(s)	Length
1.	"Ninu Choodani"	Shreya Ghoshal, Ranjith	04:56
2.	"Kotlallo Okkaday"	Shankar Mahadevan	04:04
3.	"Meenakshi Meenakshi"	Suchith Suresan, M. M. Manasi	03:42
4.	"Acharey Acharey"	Ranjith, Bindu	04:02
5.	"Masala (Remix)"	Rahul Nambiar, Naveen Madhav, Bindu	02:26
Total length:			19:12

== Production ==
=== Development ===
The film had its formal pooja ceremony on 13 March 2013 at Ramanaidu Studios in Hyderabad. The event had the crew of the film in full attendance and Ram clapped for the muhurat shot. Since Venkatesh was out of town and he couldn't attend the film's launch. Though Initially it was named "Garam Masala", it was officially renamed as "Gol Maal", which was confirmed by the Producers. Later on the titles "Ram – Balaram" and "Masala" were considered. Finally, the title was confirmed as "Masala" after the first look poster was released in September 2013.

=== Casting ===
Venkatesh and Ram were the first persons who were signed for this film in 2012. This film marks the third collaboration of Venkatesh with Vijaya Bhaskar after Nuvvu Naaku Nachav and Malliswari. Venkatesh would sport a twirled moustache in the same way which he was last seen in Gautham Menon's Gharshana. Later Anjali and Shazahn Padamsee were roped to play the siblings of Ram and Venkatesh in the film respectively. This film marked the second film of Anjali with Venkatesh after Seethamma Vakitlo Sirimalle Chettu, which was also a multistarrer film. It also marked the second film of Bollywood Actress Shazahn Padamsee after the 2010 film Orange. During the Thai Schedule of the film, Ram learnt Muay Thai, a famous boxing technique in Thailand. Jaya Prakash Reddy, Ali, M. S. Narayana and Kovai Sarala were roped in to play important roles in the film.

=== Filming ===
The film's first schedule was held in Hyderabad and few scenes were shot on Ram and Anjali. Late it was reported in the end of March that After a major schedule in Bangalore, the film will also be shot in Panchgani, near Pune. Later, Anjali, who couldn't join the film unit in Bangalore after she went missing, had promised to join the film's shooting in Panchgani. During the shoot, Rohit Shetty, the director of Bol Bachchan visited the sets and wished the team for the movie's success. In June, a fight sequence was canned on Venkatesh and Ram at Ramoji Film City in Hyderabad amidst the principal star crew's presence. In July, the complete talkie portion was shot and it was reported that only two songs were left to shoot. Later a song on Ram and Shahzan Padamsee were shot at Thailand. A song on Venkatesh and Anjali was planned to be shot in Japan from 3 September 2013. The song was shot at Hokkaido, the second largest island in Japan. The title song was shot in October in which Venkatesh, Ram, Jayaprakash Reddy, Kovai Sarala and Ali took part in the shoot thus wrapping the film's shoot.

== Release ==
AustraliaTelugu won the overseas rights for screening in Australia and New Zealand. The film had its worldwide theatrical release on 14 November 2013 to 1000 screens.

== Reception ==
=== Critical response ===
Idlebrain.com gave a review stating "On a whole, Masala is a paisa vasool movie for Venkatesh funny dialogues and JP’s reactions coupled with Ram’s balancing act!" and rated the film 3/5 terming it a "paisa vasool" (transl. Money's worth) movie.
