= Premante Inthe =

- Directed by: Ramana BV
- Produced by: Sravanthi Ravi Kishore
- Starring: Navdeep; Poonam Bajwa
- Cinematography: Hari Anumolu
- Edited by: A. Sreekar Prasad
- Music by: Koti
- Production company: Sri Sravanthi Movies
- Release date: 14 April 2006
- Country: India
- Language: Telugu

Premante Inthe (transl. This is How Love is) is a 2006 Indian Telugu-language romantic drama movie starring Navdeep and Poonam Bajwa, directed by Ramana BV. It is a remake of the Hindi movie Socha Na Tha (2005).

== Plot ==
Veeru (Navdeep) has a crush on Lizi (Rupali). But he isn't bold enough to get across his emotions to her. His rich family meanwhile wants him to marry another rich girl Pavani (Poonam Bajwa). But she is also not positively inclined towards marriage. So Veeru and Pavani hatch a plan and scupper the match. Therefore, there is some friction between the families. Meanwhile, Veeru and Pavani strike a good friendship. And he also opens his heart to Lizi. Initially his family opposes the arrangement as she is a Christian. Eventually they agree to the marriage. But on the day of the marriage, Veeru realizes that he is actually in love with Pavani.

== Cast ==
- Navdeep as Veeru
- Poonam Bajwa as Pavani
- Jackie
- Rupali as Lizi
- Naresh
- Sarath Babu
- Annapoorna
- Aishwarya
- Satya Krishnan

== Production ==
Production for the film started in October 2005. A song was shot at the Japanese Garden in Ramoji Film City in February 2006, which was also the same time that the titled was revealed by the production house.

== Soundtrack ==
Music by Koti. Venkatesh, Tarun, Sumanth, Ram Pothineni, K Vijaya Bhaskar and Trivikram Srinivas attended the audio launch as guests.

No.	Title	Singer(s)	Length
1.	"Premante Inte"	Vedala Hemachandra, Chaitra Ambadipudi	4:44
2.	"Manasuni Koncham"	Devan, Anupama Deshpande
3.	"Nee Mounam"	Sandeep, Chaitra Ambadipudi
4.	"Nidhuralo Neevente"	Sandeep
5.	"Mundey Munipadi"	Vedala Hemachandra, Chaitra Ambadipudi

== Reception ==
Navya Vaitla of Telugu Cinema wrote that "Bad screenplay, poor characterization and lack of freshness are the major flaw. Despite some good moments, you end up feeling it is not that good film in the end. Very very average film".
