= Ready (2008 film) =

2008 Indian film by Srinu Vaitla

- Theatrical release poster
- Directed by: Srinu Vaitla
- Written by: Kona Venkat (dialogue)
- Screenplay by: Srinu Vaitla
- Story by: Kona Venkat; Gopimohan
- Produced by: Sravanthi Ravi Kishore
- Starring: Ram Pothineni; Genelia D'Souza
- Cinematography: Prasad Murella
- Edited by: M. R. Varma
- Music by: Devi Sri Prasad
- Production company: Sri Sravanthi Movies
- Release date: 19 June 2008
- Running time: 175 minutes
- Country: India
- Language: Telugu
- Budget: ₹8 crore
- Box office: ₹18 crore distributors' share

Ready is a 2008 Indian Telugu-language action comedy film directed by Srinu Vaitla. Produced by Sravanthi Ravi Kishore under the Sri Sravanthi Movies banner, the film stars Ram Pothineni and Genelia, while Nassar, Brahmanandam, Sunil, Chandra Mohan, Tanikella Bharani, Kota Srinivasa Rao and Jaya Prakash Reddy play other prominent roles. The music of the film is composed by Devi Sri Prasad. Ready emerged as one of the highest-grossing Telugu films of 2008.

The film received three Nandi Awards, including the Best Popular Feature Film. It was remade in Kannada as Raam (2009), Tamil as Uthama Puthiran (2010), and in Hindi under the same name (2011).

== Plot ==
Raghupathi is the eldest of his three brothers — the other two being Raghava and Rajaram. They also have a sister Swarajyam. Chandu is the only son of Raghava. The family owns the shopping mall R. S. Brothers. Chandu plans the elopement of his cousin Swapna with her boyfriend due to which he is ousted from the house and is isolated from his family by Raghupathi. However, Chandu tries to re-establish links with his family members, but to no avail. Meanwhile, on the last day of his college, Chandu and his friends meet their friend "Google" Gopi who is depressed because his girlfriend will marry someone else. Chandu decides to stop the marriage and marry off her to Gopi. However, they kidnap Pooja instead of Gopi's girlfriend due to a mistaken identity due to the function hall's name. After being chased by some hooligans – who are after Pooja – they escape with the exception of Chandu and Pooja who end up in the forest. Chandu falls for Pooja who also reciprocates his feelings.

After learning that her best friend is not in town, Pooja decides to stay in Chandu's home disguising herself as a disciple of Raghupathi's spiritual guru. Chandu is also welcomed back in his family. When he was about to propose to Pooja, Chandu gets to know about the true identity of Pooja. She is an NRI who came to visit her warring maternal uncles Peddinaidu and Chitti Naidu. Both of them try to force her into marriage with their respective sons to get a hold of her property she inherits. Chandu decides to transform them before marrying Pooja. He joins their auditor "McDonald" Murthy as his assistant. Murthy introduces Chandu as his nephew to both Peddinaidu and Chitti Naidu. When asked about Chandu's experience in auditing, Murthy lies to them that he used to be an auditor in America to imaginary brothers "Chicago" Subba Rao and "Dallas" Nageswara Rao.

Chandu manipulates Murthy's funny idea and makes his uncle Raghupathi and his father pose as Chicago Subba Rao and Dallas Nageswara Rao, respectively Swarajyam's husband and Rajaram pose themselves as the friends of Pooja's parents and make Peddinaidu think twice about his son's marriage with Pooja after they deliberately lie to him that her parents took a loan of 1 billion from World Bank. Chitti Naidu also decides to call off his son's marriage with Pooja after Chandu plays a prank on him that Chicago Subba Rao's daughter has more property than Pooja. On the day of the wedding, Nagappa learns the truth behind Chandu's lies and attempts to tell his father and uncle about this. However, Chandu knocks him out, makes it to the wedding on time. Chandu and Pooja get married. The next day, Nagappa escapes reveals the whole truth about Chandu's lies. Chandu admits what he did because he wanted to change them into better human beings so they can be a part of the family. Nagappa tries to kill Chandu but Peddi Naidu tries to stop them. Nagappa pushes him and Chitti Naidu beats him for hurting his brother. Peddi Naidu and Pooja are pleased to see how his brother defends him. Peddi Naidu and Chitti Naidu are also happy with Chandu for what making them realize their mistakes and changing them into better people, uniting Pooja's family together. They give Chandu and Pooja their blessings, sending them to Chandu's home happily.

== Cast ==
- Ram Pothineni as Chandrasekhar "Chandu" Rao, a happy-go-lucky guy who is always willing to help others. He is introduced to Pooja as Danaiah
- Genelia D'Souza as Pooja, an NRI who comes to India to visit her maternal uncles. She lost her parents in an air accident and is brought up by her uncles.
- Nassar as Raghupathi, the head of Chandu's family and business. He disguises himself as Chicago Subba Rao, an Indian American industrialist.
- Tanikella Bharani as Raghava, Raghupathi's younger brother and Chandu's father. He disguises himself as Dallas Nageswara Rao.
- Brahmanandam as C.A. Krishna Murthy, who once worked in McDowell's company later joined as Peddi Naidu, and Chitti Naidu's Auditor, that's why they call him as "McDowell" Murthy.
- Sunil as Janaki, Chandu's cousin.
- Chandra Mohan as V.V Rao, Swarajyam's husband and Janaki's father. He disguises himself as a World Bank executive.
- Kota Srinivasa Rao as Peddi Naidu, the elder of the two brothers. He tries to marry off his son to Pooja to grab her property, in the process, even breaking up with his brother
- Jaya Prakash Reddy as Chitti Naidu, the younger of the two brothers. He also tries to force Pooja into marrying his son, with the intention of acquiring her property. He even spars with his brother over whose son should marry Pooja.
- Supreeth as Narasimha, Peddi Naidu's right-hand man
- Shafi as Nagappa, Chitti Naidu's son
- Pragathi as Rajyam, Chandu's mother
- Sudha as Lakshmi, Raghupathi's wife
- Rajitha as Swarajyam, Janaki's mother
- Srinivasa Reddy as Raju, Chandu's friend
- M. S. Narayana as Chinna Sastry
- Vajja Venkata Giridhar as Rajaram, Raghupathi's second younger brother and Chandu's uncle, who disguises himself as a World Bank executive.
- Satya Krishnan as Rajaram's wife
- Dharmavarapu Subramanyam as Santosh "Happy" Reddy
- M. Balayya as Ganapathi Sastry
- Ravi Varma as "Google" Gopi, Chandu's friend
- Master Bharath as Junior Chitti Naidu "Puli"
- Surekha Vani as Junior Chitti Naidu's mother
- Master Uday Nair as Chinna Peddi Naidu
- Ravishankar Dwivedula as the Priest who performs the marriage for Google Gopi
- Suman Setty as Chandu's friend
- Saranya Ponvannan as Chittinaidu's wife
- Nagendra Babu as Chalasani Prasad, Pooja's father
- Vinaya Prasad as Peddi Naidu's wife
- Prudhvi Raj as Peddi Naidu and Chitti Naidu's father
- Amit Tiwari as a student foe turned friend to Chandu
- Gautam Raju as Rangaiah Naidu's brother-in-law
- Bharath Reddy as Gautham
- C. V. L. Narasimha Rao as doctor
- Gundu Sudarshan as marriage broker
- Fish Venkat as Chitti Naidu's henchman
- Jenny as Chinna Chitti Naidu's victim
- Bharath Raju as Peddi Naidu's son
- Apoorva as Sukumari, Krishna "McDowell" Murthy's wife
- Vennela Rama Rao as Bhadrappa, Junior Chitti Naidu's father
- Vidya as Chandu's friend

Cameo appearance

- Tamannaah Bhatia as Swapna, Chandu's cousin, Janaki's sister
- Navdeep as Bhaskar, Swapna's Boyfriend turned Husband

== Music ==
Ready

Soundtrack album by Devi Sri Prasad
- Released: 19 May 2008
- Recorded: 2008
- Genre: Feature film soundtrack
- Length: 28:04
- Label: Aditya Music
- Producer: Devi Sri Prasad

Devi Sri Prasad chronology
Santosh Subramaniam (2008)	Ready (2008)	Sangama (2008)

The film has six songs composed by Devi Sri Prasad. The audio was released on 19 May 2008 and the reviews were mostly positive.

Track-List
No.	Title	Lyrics	Singer(s)	Length
1.	"Get Ready!"	Sirivennela Seetharama Sastry	Karthik	5:06
2.	"Ayyo Ayyo Ayyo Danayya!"	Ramajogayya Sastry, Benny	Priya Himesh, Franco Simon, Benny Dayal	4:30
3.	"Mere Sajnaa!"	Ramajogayya Sastry	Kunal Ganjawala, Shreya Ghoshal	4:16
4.	"Ninne Pelladukoni Rajaipota"	Ramajogayya Sastry	Ranjith, Kalpana	5:22
5.	"Naa Pedavulu Nuvvaithe"	Sirivennela Seetarama Sastry	Sagar, Gopika Poornima	3:59
6.	"Om Namaste Bolo"	Ramajogayya Sastry	Neeraj Shridhar, Divya	4:21
Total length:				28:04

== Reception ==
Jeevi of Idlebrain.com rated the film at 3.25 out of a scale of 5 saying that it is "Stuffed with ample commercial elements, mainly vibrant comedy". Teluguone.com rated the film at 3.75 out of 5 saying that the film is a "Neat family entertainer with an appreciable dose of clean comedy". It also says that though "The story and treatment has shades of Gudumba Shankar to a large extent, but good-natured comedy makes the movie quite enjoyable for a light viewing". Ram was fabulous and Brahmanandam was well appreciated for his performance by Sify saying that "As 'McDowell' Murthy, Brahmanandam brings the house down".

== Awards ==
Nandi Awards - 2008 - Won

- Best Popular Feature Film - Sravanthi Ravi Kishore
- Best Male Comedian – Brahmanandam
- Best Child Actor – Master Bharath

Filmfare Awards South

Nominations

- Best Film – Sai Kishore
- Best Director – Srinu Vaitla
- Best Actor – Ram Pothineni
- Best Supporting Actor – Brahmanandam
