= Red (2021 film) =

2021 Indian Telugu film by Kishore Tirumala

- Film poster
- Directed by: Kishore Tirumala
- Screenplay by: Kishore Tirumala
- Based on: Thadam (2019) by Magizh Thirumeni
- Produced by: Sravanthi Ravi Kishore
- Starring: Ram Pothineni; Nivetha Pethuraj; Malvika Sharma; Amritha Aiyer
- Cinematography: Sameer Reddy
- Edited by: Junaid Siddiqui
- Music by: Mani Sharma
- Production company: Sri Sravanthi Movies
- Release date: 14 January 2021
- Running time: 146 minutes
- Country: India
- Language: Telugu
- Box office: ₹35.64 crore

Red is a 2021 Indian Telugu-language crime thriller film directed by Kishore Tirumala and produced by Sri Sravanthi Movies. It stars Ram Pothineni in a double role with Nivetha Pethuraj, Malvika Sharma and Amritha Aiyer. A remake of the Tamil film Thadam (2019), it follows a murder investigation involving a civil engineer and his lookalike as prime suspects.

The film was announced in October, had its principal shoot commenced in November 2019 and ended in March 2020. Most of the film was shot in Hyderabad, except for two songs that were shot in Italy. Red has music composed by Mani Sharma while Sameer Reddy and Junaid Siddiquii performed the cinematography and editing, respectively. The film was released on 14 January 2021, coinciding with Sankranthi, after being delayed from its initial release date of 9 April 2020, due to the COVID-19 pandemic. The film received mixed reviews, but was a commercial success grossing over ₹35.64 crore on a production budget of ₹20 crore becoming the tenth highest-grossing Telugu film of 2021.

== Plot ==
Siddharth is an IIT graduated civil engineer running a successful building firm, while his lookalike, Aditya, is a gambling thief who deceives people along with his sidekick, Vema. Siddharth is in love with Mahima, while Gayathri loves Aditya, unaware of his real identity. One day, Aditya tries to help Vema pay his debt by extracting money from Gayathri through lies, but she helps him in spite of knowing the truth. After taking the money, Aditya is enraged, and so is Siddharth after a party. That night, one of them breaks into a house and attacks the owner, Akash, stabbing him to death.

The next day, Aditya frees Vema by paying his debt and wins Gayathri's trust by returning her money and telling her the truth. As the investigation of Akash's murder proceeds, a selfie clicked by a couple nearby is found with either Siddharth or Aditya in it. Both of them are brought in and interrogated without knowledge of the other's presence. CI Nagendra, who shares an old rivalry with Siddharth, tortures him. Siddharth's alibi is that his car broke down, and as his car doesn't have the repair kit, he called a taxi driver to help him. Sub-inspector Yamini handles Aditya, who on the other hand, cites various laws to escape torture and teases her. She reaches out to Akash's friend and his servant, showing them the photograph of Siddharth/Aditya, but neither of them refuses to recognize him. She also questions Vema and orders him not to leave the city without permission, but he secretly escapes, having been ordered by Aditya prior itself.

Yamini then learns of the rivalry between Siddharth and Nagendra; Siddharth helped Nagendra's daughter elope with her lover against her father's wishes, and Nagendra held a grudge on him ever since then. The forensic expert informs Yamini about a hair sample recovered from the crime scene and how it doesn't match anyone else in Akash's home. At the police station, Siddharth tries to escape but is interrupted by Aditya. The two violently fight, hurting everyone and vandalizing the station in the process.

Aditya and Siddharth are revealed to be identical twins after their DNA is found to be the same, and both confess their pasts: The twins parted ways in their childhood when their parents divorced. Aditya lived with his mother, who developed a gambling addiction to cope with her grief and anger over her difficult family and marital life but wouldn't refuse anyone who asked for help. One day, Aditya's mother promised to give up gambling, but instead committed suicide. Aditya was then taken in by his father, who showed no love to him. As a result, he ended up developing an addiction for gambling. One day, his father spotted him gambling and took him by force, who got into a fight with him and Siddarth. The twins then spent some time in a mental development institution due to anger-management issues for a year, and fought against each other violently.

Later, Aditya became interested in studying law but eventually left school due to his lack of college ethics. The duo separated once their dad died, but Aditya yet followed Siddarth discreetly, feeling jealous upon seeing the latter's daily life. Recently, when Aditya came home one day and left in front of Siddharth, his ring for Mahima went missing. Siddharth reported his brother to the police, who beat him up. Aditya himself told Siddharth where the ring was, causing Siddharth to realize his mistake. Aditya had actually come home for a photo of their mother and vowed to seek revenge.

Nagendra still wants to frame Siddharth for Akash's murder, but the taxi driver who helped Siddharth confirms he was really stuck on the night of the murder. It is also proved that Aditya paid Vema's debt with gambling money he won after playing all night. The court acquits both Aditya and Siddharth in order to protect the innocent one from punishment. Nagendra voluntarily retires without getting his revenge. A week after the judgement, Yamini sees Mahima's photo while shifting her items to the upper floor, and calls Akash's friend to inquire about the girl he was infatuated with and is shocked to learn it was Mahima. Siddharth is finally revealed to have murdered Akash for drugging, kidnapping and raping Mahima to death out of a childhood lust. Akash had also bribed the police to avoid charges. When Aditya found out about the murder, he helped Siddharth by getting himself arrested in a drunk and drive case to throw off the police.

Later, Aditya meets with Siddharth and explains how Yamini can't reopen the case since she created a fake witness to help Siddharth and could get herself arrested, having been suspended once for doing this. Siddharth gives Aditya a photograph of them with their mother and says he is going to Mumbai, and later to Copenhagen, never to return, having sold all of his property in India. After his marriage to Gayathri, Aditya realizes his lack of trust in his mother, coupled with her family's, prompted her to kill herself. He promises to do better with his wife.

== Cast ==
- Ram Pothineni in a dual role as
  - Siddharth "Sid"; Aditya' s brother
  - Aditya "Adi"; Siddharth's brother
- Nivetha Pethuraj as SI Yamini
- Malvika Sharma as Mahima, Siddharth's love interest
- Amritha Aiyer as Gayathri, Aditya's love interest
- Sampath Raj as CI C.Nagendra Kumar
- Akshara Nunna as Nagendra Kumar's daughter
- Vennela Kishore as Forensic officer Purushottam, Yamini's one-sided lover
- Nassar as Justice Krishnamurthy (cameo appearance)
- Posani Krishna Murali as Adv. Parthasarathy
- Satya as Vema, Aditya's friend
- RCM Raju as Head Constable Paidi, Yamini's aide
- Pammi Sai as Constable Raghava, Paidi's aide
- Sonia Agarwal as Bharathi, Siddharth and Aditya's mother
- Ravi Prakash as Siddharth & Aditya's father
- Pavitra Lokesh as Pavithra, a con-artist and Aditya's partner
- Sivannarayana Naripeddi as Adv. Appaji
- Narra Srinivas as Constable Sudhakar Pasupula
- Sasidhar Kosuri as ASI Bhupathi, Nagendra's aide who assists in his investigation against Siddarth
- Praveen Prabhu as Akash, Mahima's obsessive lover
- Surya Sreenivas as Siddharth's friend
- Charandeep as Babji, Vema's creditor who threatens Vema to return the money borrowed from him
- Hebah Patel as item number in "Dinchak"

== Production ==
=== Development ===
On 13 March 2019, producers Sravanthi Ravi Kishore of Sri Sravanthi Movies, purchased the remake rights of the Arun Vijay-starrer Thadam (2019), starring Ram Pothineni in the lead role. However, he had not signed his final call for the film, as he was busy in shooting for the film ISmart Shankar (2019) in Goa, which is also yet to see the Tamil film. Although it was rumoured that Magizh Thirumeni, the director of its original counterpart, wanted to direct its Telugu remake, Kishore Tirumala was signed to helm the project. The film marks the third collaboration of Ram and Tirumala, after Nenu Sailaja (2016) and Vunnadhi Okate Zindagi (2017).

In July 2019, Nivetha Pethuraj was cast for Vidya Pradeep's character from the original film. Actresses Malvika Sharma and Amritha Aiyer were also signed. On 28 October 2019, coinciding the eve of Diwali, title of the film was announced as Red.

=== Filming ===
The film was launched on 30 October 2019, at a studio in Hyderabad, and Puri Jagannadh and Charmme Kaur, clapped the first shot of the film. Although, the makers announced that the shooting of the film will commence from 16 November 2019, filming began two days earlier. The film has action choreographed by Peter Hein.

While the major portions of the film were shot in Hyderabad, the makers headed to Italy, to shoot two songs for the film, choreographed by Shobi Paulraj. The shoot was commenced on 12 February 2020 in Florence, Tuscany and the Dolomites, and ended on 20 February. It was also announced that the dubbing of the film was completed within early February.

The makers headed to Hyderabad to complete the last leg of the shoot on 5 March. According to reports, a song featuring Ram Pothineni alongside Hebah Patel was shot in the Ramoji Film City in Hyderabad, choreographed by Jani Master. Principal photography wrapped up in March 2020, although Ram completed dubbing for his portions by October 2020.

== Soundtrack ==
Red

Soundtrack album by Mani Sharma
- Released: 12 January 2021
- Recorded: 2020
- Genre: Feature film soundtrack
- Length: 18:23
- Language: Telugu
- Label: Lahari Music; T-Series
- Producer: Mani Sharma

Mani Sharma chronology
ISmart Shankar (2019)	Red (2021)	Narappa (2021)
External audio
- Audio Jukebox on YouTube

Singles from Red
- 1. "Nuvve Nuvve" Released: 6 March 2020; 2. "Kaun Acha Kaun Lucha" Released: 12 December 2020; 3. "Dinchak" Released: 30 December 2020

The film's soundtrack album is composed by Mani Sharma, with lyrics written by Sirivennela Sitarama Sastry, Kasarla Shyam and Kalyan Chakravarthy. The film marks Sharma's first collaboration with Kishore Tirumala, and second collaboration with Ram, after ISmart Shankar (2019). The film's first song, "Nuvve Nuvve", was released by Lahari Music on 6 March 2020. The song "Dinchak" had vocals featuring Saketh and Keerthana Sharma, who earlier sung a similar song from Ram Pothineni's ISmart Shankar, which was also composed by Mani Sharma. It was initially slated to release as the film's second single, after the response for its promo which released on the occasion of Ram's birthday, 15 May 2020. However, the makers released another song "Kaun Acha Kaun Lucha" as the second single track on 12 December 2020. After a request from fans, the makers released the full song of "Dinchak" as the third single on the occasion of New Year's Eve on 30 December 2020. The full album was released on 12 January 2021.

Track listing
No.	Title	Lyrics	Singer(s)	Length
1.	"Nuvve Nuvve"	Sirivennela Sitarama Sastry	Ramya Behara, Anurag Kulkarni	4:12
2.	"Dinchak"	Kasarla Shyam	Saketh Komanduri, Keerthana Sharma	5:20
3.	"Kaun Acha Kaun Lucha"	Kalyan Chakravarthy	Anurag Kulkarni	4:23
4.	"Mounanga Unna"	Sirivennela Sitarama Sastry	Dinker, Nutana Mohan	4:27
Total length:				18:20

== Release ==
Red was initially scheduled to release theatrically on 9 April 2020, but was postponed due to the COVID-19 pandemic. There were rumours surfacing that the film might premiere on an over-the-top media service (OTT), however, Ram confirmed the film would have a theatrical release. In an interview with The Times of India, regarding the speculation on the film's release, he stated "There were very few OTT platforms which approached us with a good deal. But we refused to release it on OTT as the movie was meant only for the big screens, and we intend to give a fine movie watching experience to our audience." Later the year, the film's release date was announced as 14 January 2021.

On late January 2021, the makers announced that the film will be released in seven dubbed languages, which includes Hindi, Tamil, Malayalam, Kannada, Marathi, Bengali and Bhojpuri apart from being released in the Telugu original. The Tamil dubbed version is scheduled for a direct premiere on OTT platform, whereas the Kannada dubbed version titled Clue will be released theatrically on 14 January 2021, along with the Telugu version. The Malayalam dubbed version was scheduled for a release on 21 January 2022. The Hindi-dubbed version was scheduled for a release on 28 January 2022 but was directly premiered on Goldmines TV channel on 11 September 2022. The release of the Marathi, Bengali and Bhojpuri dubbed versions were not finalized, with sources claiming that the film might be released in February 2021 in these three languages.

The film began streaming on Netflix and Sun NXT from 25 February 2021, within 42 days of its theatrical release.

== Reception ==
=== Critical response ===
Neetishta Nyayapati of The Times of India gave 2.5 out of 5 and stated,"RED has its moments and has two characters that are kind of interesting at its core. It also has a brilliant cast. If only it were not let down by a draggy screenplay. Give this one a chance only if a weird, mixed dose of romance, thriller and masala is your cup of tea." Sangeetha Devi Dundoo of The Hindu stated "Red is intriguing in parts; it could have been a better thriller had it been more consistent and, of course, concise."

Hemanth Kumar of Firstpost gave the film 2.5 out of 5 and stated, "The problem with RED is that it explains too much. It treats its more thrilling elements as a sideshow because it tries to turn the story into a wholesome family drama. Despite an interesting premise, the film itself isn’t consistently interesting."
