= Nenu Sailaja =

Nenu.. Sailaja...
- Theatrical release poster
- Directed by: Kishore Tirumala
- Written by: Kishore Tirumala
- Produced by: Sravanthi Ravi Kishore
- Starring: Ram Pothineni; Keerthy Suresh
- Cinematography: Sameer Reddy
- Edited by: A. Sreekar Prasad
- Music by: Devi Sri Prasad
- Production company: Sri Sravanthi Movies
- Release date: 1 January 2016
- Running time: 135 minutes
- Country: India
- Language: Telugu
- Box office: est.₹40.1 crore

Nenu.. Sailaja... (transl. Me and Sailaja) is a 2016 Indian Telugu-language romantic comedy film directed by Kishore Tirumala and produced by Sravanthi Ravi Kishore, starring Ram Pothineni and Keerthy Suresh. The film was produced by Sri Sravanthi Movies, which also produced Ram's previous film Shivam. It was also released on 1 January 2016. This film marked the Telugu debut of Keerthy Suresh.

== Plot ==
Hari is a happy go-lucky DJ. From his childhood, Hari used to propose to every girl that he came across but was turned down every time. He lives with his parents and twin sister Swecha. He still tries to woo every girl he encounters but fails. To overcome this depression, he sits with his best friend by the lighthouse in Vizag beach. He then starts drinking with his friend and shares memories of his 1st love in the village with a girl where Hari was staying before his father was transferred to Vizag. Hari, in an inebriated condition, is about to fall into the sea. But he is saved by Shailu. Hari asks her to drop him home as he has no money or vehicle to get home. Shailu offers lift, but drops him in the middle as she thinks he is trying to woo her and even doesn't tell him her name when asked by Hari. He then tells his friend that if God exists, he will never meet her again.

Next day in the hospital Hari encounters a young mute girl Pooja and politely asks about her name and school to which she responds by expressions. Shailu, also present in the hospital, gets impressed by Hari's behaviour and notes down his phone number when Hari gives Pooja his number. In another incident, when the roads are blocked by goons in order to inaugurate a statue by the minister, Hari beats them up and gives way to a passing ambulance which again impresses Shailu who was also present there. Meanwhile, it is revealed that Shailu was the girl with whom Hari first fell in love.

Meanwhile, a local goon Maharishi goes to Shailu's office and threatens Keerti, who is Shailu's friend and tells her to forget her boyfriend as he is marrying someone else. Shailu then calls Hari and asks for his help. They meet and there Hari reveals his name to Shailu and Keerti. Hari devises a plan and fools Maharishi by making a woman who claims that she is his childhood lover Suchitra and Keerti is her daughter talk to him. This results in Keerti's marriage with her lover.

Hari, now falls in love with Shailu. They spend time with each other. One day, he drops her from office to home when she reveals that she has to go to Goa the following day for an ad shoot. Hari drives her to the airport where Shailu asks him to come to Goa along with him to which he agrees. During the ad shoot, Hari recognizes that Shailu is the girl that he had fallen in love in his childhood. They spend a good time together in Goa where Shailu tells him that the boy who lived near her house used to make her smile and today Hari is making her smile without knowing that it was Hari himself.

After they come back to Hyderabad, Hari takes Shailu to his house and introduces her to his family. She learns that Hari was the boy who made her happy during her childhood by seeing the childhood photos of Hari in his home. She then gets a call from her mother to return to the village. Hari fails to contact Shailu for a few days. After few weeks Shailu arrives and Hari tells her about his feelings to which she replies, "Hari, I love you but I am not in love with you" which has totally confused Hari. Meanwhile, goons come to kidnap Shailu as her father refused to sell a part of his land. Hari thrashes them and asks Shailu about her problem. She leaves.

After a few days Hari joins a meditation centre to get over Shailu. He then sees his sister Swecha with her boyfriend at a bar one night. At home when Hari complains about the relationship, it is revealed that her boyfriend is Ashok, Shailu's brother. It is also revealed that Shailu's aunt had asked her father Srinivas Rao for Shailu's hand in marriage for her son Amar. Hari, now meets Ashok and tells him that he has to learn about his family first in order to get them married. To Shailu's surprise, he meets her family as Ashok's friend. Ashok learns from a phone call from Maharishi that Hari has actually come for Shailu. He gets on well with the family members and then uses this opportunity to bring the family members close to each other as they had no proper bonding in between due to some misunderstanding when Shailu was born. He reunites Shailu's grandfather with his son Srinivas and makes Shailu realise her father is a good father.

Things go as per plan until Maharishi arrives to attend the wedding thinking that Shailu and Hari are getting married. He is about to spill the beans when Hari saves everything in time. Shailu then asks Hari to leave the place as soon as possible as it would cause no benefit to him. Two days prior to the marriage, Shailu hugs Hari as she thinks she would lose him forever which is seen by the housemaid. She then tells Shailu's mother that she thinks Shailu is not happy with the marriage, upon asking Shailu to which she agrees. The next day while her mother shares this with the family, Srinivas Rao gets a call that Shailu has been kidnapped. He orders Hari to get her back to which he succeeds. Now Maharshi tells everything to the family members about their love story upon which Hari and Maharishi are thrown out of the house by Amar.

Shailu then tells her father that she loved Hari and no one can understand her better than him. On the marriage day, Srinivas takes Shailu to the railway station where she meets Hari and tells him that she loves him. Hari reveals that he would not let the marriage happen at any cost, so he had waited. Meanwhile, Srinivas Rao gets a call from her sister that Amar is missing, who is actually kidnapped by Maharishi as retribution for humiliating him in Srinivas Rao's house. Thus Hari and Shailu are reunited.

Shailu eventually marries Hari and they have a baby daughter. The film ends with Shailu visiting her father in their hometown.

== Cast ==
- Ram Pothineni as Hari
  - Master Hansik as child Hari
- Keerthy Suresh as Sailaja a.k.a. Sailu, Hari's love interest
  - Baby Dolly as child Sailaja
- Sathyaraj as Srinivasa Rao, Sailaja & Ashok's father
- Prince Cecil as Ashok, Sailaja's brother
- Sreemukhi as Swecha, Hari's twin sister
- Pradeep Rawat as Maharshi
- Rohini as Sailaja & Ashok's mother
- Dhanya Balakrishna as Keerthi
- Himaja as Suchithra, maid
- Vijayakumar as Sailaja & Ashok's grandfather
- Naresh as Hari & Swecha's father
- Sudigali Sudheer as Hari's friend
- Vamsi Krishna as Babji, the villain
- Chaitanya Krishna as Vijaya Krishna, Rajasree's son
- Rajasree Nair as Sailaja & Ashok's aunt
- Krishna Bhagavaan as Srinivasa's friend
- Pragathi as Hari & Swecha's mother
- Baby Yodha as Puja
- Tanya Hope (special appearance in the song "Night is Still Young")
- Chitra Shukla as Theatregoer (special appearance in the song "Crazy Feeling")
- Kajal Aggarwal as herself (uncredited portrait appearance in the song "Crazy Feeling")

== Music ==
Nenu Sailaja

Soundtrack album by Devi Sri Prasad
- Released: 21 December 2015
- Recorded: 2015
- Genre: Film soundtrack
- Length: 20:22
- Language: Telugu
- Label: Aditya Music
- Producer: Devi Sri Prasad

Devi Sri Prasad chronology
Kumari 21F (2015)	Nenu Sailaja (2015)	Nannaku Prematho (2016)

Music was composed by Devi Sri Prasad and released by Aditya Music.

Track-List
No.	Title	Lyrics	Singer(s)	Length
1.	"The Night Is Still Young"	Sagar	David Simon	3:08
2.	"Crazy Feeling"	Ramajogayya Sastry	Prudhvi Chandra	3:30
3.	"Masti Masti"	Anantha Sriram	Sooraj Santhosh, Swetha Mohan	3:40
4.	"Sailaja Sailaja"	Bhaskarabhatla Ravi Kumar	Sagar	3:54
5.	"Em Cheppanu"	Sirivennela Seetarama Sastry	Karthik	4:46
6.	"Ee Premaki"	Sirivennela Seetarama Sastry	K. S. Chithra	1:24
Total length:				20:22

== Reception ==
=== Critical reception ===
Pranita Jonnakagedda of The Times of India rated the film 3 stars out of five and wrote "Nenu.. Sailaja… doesn’t really offer anything new. But it comes across as a culmination of some very well shot sequences, commendable performances and real world simplicity." While praising Ram for his performance, she added that "the credit would majorly go to director Kishore Tirumala who not only visualized him in this character but also managed to draw the best from him."

The Hindu's Sangeetha Devi wrote that "though the film isn’t telling us a radically new story, we give in and soak in the milieu created by Kishore." Devi also stated that "the plot focuses so much on the complex father-daughter bond that one never gets an idea of how the son responded to the father." Madhavi Tata writing for the Outlook stated that the film is a "combo of Dilwale Dulhania Le Jayenge and Dil Chahta Hai."

=== Box office ===
The film collected ₹40.1 crore worldwide. This film was a commercial success.

== Awards and nominations ==
Year	Award	Category	Recipient	Result	Ref.
2016	Nandi Awards	Nandi Award for Best Screenplay Writer	Kishore Tirumala	Won	
2016	Nandi Awards	Nandi Award for Best Feature Film - Bronze	Sravanthi Ravi Kishore	Won	
2017	64th Filmfare Awards South	Filmfare Award for Best Female Playback Singer – Telugu	K. S. Chithra for ''Ee Premaki''	Won	
2017	6th South Indian International Movie Awards	SIIMA Award for Best Male Playback Singer (Telugu)	Sagar for ''Sailaja Sailaja''	Won	
