= Chaitra Ambadipudi =

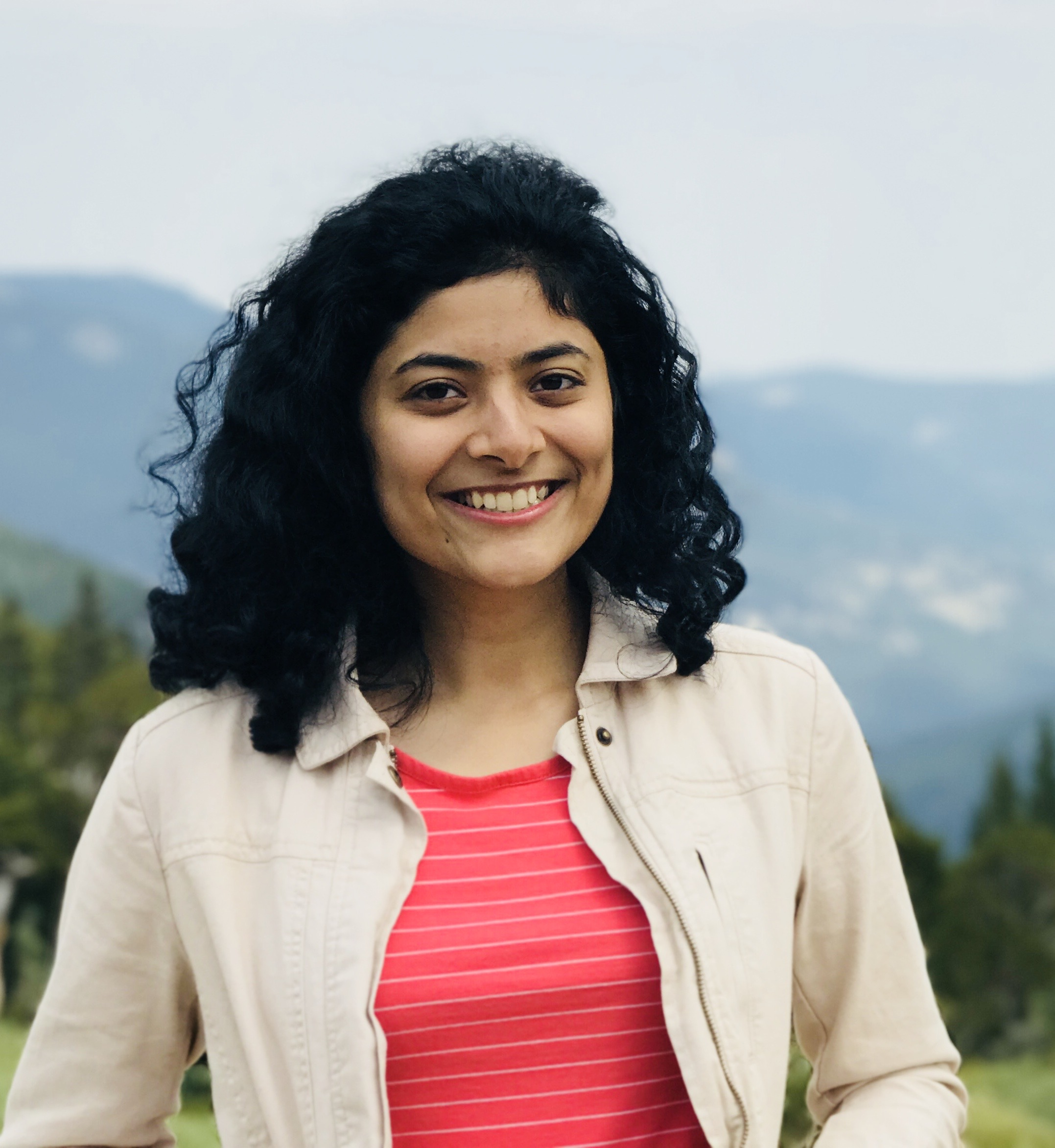

Background information
- Occupations: Playback singer
- Years active: 2004-present

Chaitra Ambadipudi is an Indian playback singer from Hyderabad, India. She predominantly sings for Telugu, Tamil, Kannada, Malayalam, and Hindi language movies.

== Early life and childhood ==
Chaitra informally began learning music at the age of 10, where her parents Ramana Murthy and Padma Priya, although not professionally trained themselves, taught her what they observed from listening to music. The informal syllabus consisted of over 200 Indian film songs from the 1950s and 1960s, which are deeply rooted in Indian Classical Music. Eventually, Chaitra learnt Hindustani Classical Music from Smt. Geeta Hedge in Bangalore, India.

== Career ==
In 2004, at the age of 12, Chaitra began her playback singing career by recording her first Telugu playback song, Toli Toliga, for the movie Andaru Dongale Dorikithe, composed by the late Sri. Chakri.

In 2005, Chaitra won the Paadalani Undi singing show that aired on MAA TV that was hosted by the late S P Balasubrahmanyam.

=== Discography ===
Year	Film	Song	Music director	Language
2023	Anni Manchi Sakunamule	"Sita Kalyanam"	Mickey J. Meyer	Telugu
2023	Anni Manchi Sakunamule	"Cheyyi Cheyyi Kalipeddam"	Mickey J. Meyer	Telugu
2023	Anni Manchi Sakunamule	"Yemito"	Mickey J. Meyer	Telugu
2023	Ramabanam	"Dharuveyy Ra"	Mickey J. Meyer	Telugu
2022	Aa Ammayi Gurinchi Meeku Cheppali	"Kottha Kottha Gaa"	Vivek Sagar	Telugu
2021	Shyam Singha Roy	"Edo Edo"	Mickey J. Meyer	Telugu
2021	Shyam Singha Roy	"Yetho Yetho"	Mickey J. Meyer	Tamil
2021	Shyam Singha Roy	"Yeno Yeno"	Mickey J. Meyer	Kannada
2021	Shyam Singha Roy	"Thira Punarum"	Mickey J. Meyer	Malayalam
2021	Shyam Singha Roy	"Sirivennela - Female version"	Mickey J. Meyer	Telugu
2021	Aaradugula Bullet	"Columbus"	Mani Sharma	Telugu
2021	Raja Vikramarka	"Sammathame"	Prashanth R Vihari	Telugu
2020	Rallalo Neeru	"Dooram"	Vivek Sagar	Telugu
2018	Aan Devathai	"Pesugindren"	Ghibran	Tamil
2018	Sammohanam	"Kanulalo Thadigaa"	Vivek Sagar	Telugu
2018	Ratsasan	"Kaadhal Kadal Dhana"	Ghibran	Tamil
2018	Naa Peru Surya	"Beautiful Love"	Vishal-Shekhar	Telugu
2018	Vishwaroopam II	"Aadhaarama Anuraagama"	Ghibran	Telugu
2014	Manam	"Manam Theme"	Anup Rubens	Telugu
2014	Heart Attack	"Selavanuko"	Anup Rubens	Telugu
2014	Heart Attack	"Ra Ra Vasthava"	Anup Rubens	Telugu
2014	Eduru Leni Alexander	"Kavvinchina	Dr. Josyabatla Sarma	Telugu
2013	Special 26	"Kaun Mera"	M M Kreem	Hindi
2013	Nayana	"Yeduruga Ee Vela"	Karthik Rodriguez	Telugu
2013	Gunde Jaari Gallanthayyinde	"Ding Ding Ding"	Anup Rubens	Telugu
2013	The Attacks of 26/11	"Khoon Kharaba Tabaahi"	Amar Mohile	Hindi
2012	Racha	"Vaana Vaana"	Mani Sharma	Telugu
2012	Lovely	"I Don't Know"	Anup Rubens	Telugu
2012	Lovely	"Evo Evevo"	Anup Rubens	Telugu
2012	Adhinayakudu	"Mast Jawani"	Kalyani Malik	Telugu
2011	Anaganaga O Dheerudu	"Ninnu Choodani"	M. M. Keeravani	Telugu
2010	Jhummandi Naadam	"Yem Sakkagunnavro"	M. M. Keeravani	Telugu
2010	Vedam	"Prapancham Naaventa Vasthunte"	M. M. Keeravani	Telugu
2007	Classmates	"Gunde Chatuga – Female"	Koti	Telugu
2006	Premante Inte	"Nee Mounam"	Koti	Telugu
2006	Premante Inte	"Mundey Munipadi"	Koti	Telugu
2004	Andaru Dongale Dorikite	"Toli Toliga"	Chakri	Telugu
