= Jhummandi Naadam =

- Directed by: K. Raghavendra Rao
- Written by: Bhupati Raja; Gopimohan; B.V.S.Ravi; Raja Simha
- Produced by: Lakshmi Manchu
- Starring: Manoj Manchu; Taapsee; Mohan Babu; Suman
- Cinematography: S. Gopal Reddy
- Edited by: Marthand K. Venkatesh
- Music by: M. M. Keeravani
- Production company: Sree Lakshmi Prasanna Pictures
- Release date: 1 July 2010
- Country: India
- Language: Telugu

Jhummandi Naadam is a 2010 Indian Telugu-language musical drama film produced by Lakshmi Manchu and directed by K. Raghavendra Rao. The film stars Manoj Manchu and debutant Taapsee in the lead roles and Mohan Babu in a supporting role. The film's music is composed by M. M. Keeravani with cinematography by S. Gopal Reddy and editing by Marthand K. Venkatesh. The film released on 1 July 2010 and was a commercial success at the box office.

== Plot ==
Balu (Manoj Manchu) has only one goal in his life - to become a great playback singer like S. P. Balasubrahmanyam. He challenges a landlord in his village and comes to Hyderabad to become a singer. Captain Rao (Mohan Babu) stays in the opposite house. He is an old-fashioned man who hates the lifestyle of the new generation. Sravya (Taapsee) is an NRI girl who stays in Rao's house, as Rao is a friend of her father (Suman). She is in India to shoot a documentary on traditional Telugu music. Balu acts as a guide to her and in the process, they fall in love. Rao does not like them falling in love with each other. The rest of the story is about Rao's restrictions and how the lovers emerge unscathed.

== Cast ==
- Manoj Manchu as Balu
- Taapsee as Sravya
- Mohan Babu as Captain Rao
- Suman as Sravya's father
- Brahmanandam as Brahmi
- M. S. Narayana as Rao's friend
- Ali as Ranjith Kumar
- Dharmavarapu Subramanyam as Music show judge
- Ahuti Prasad
- Tanikella Bharani as Balu's father
- Sudha as Balu's mother
- Aishwarya as Rao's wife
- Pragathi as Sravya's mother
- Vithika Sheru (credited as Keerthi) as Balu's friend
- Ananth
- Lakshmi Manchu as Narrator (guest appearance)
- Dasari Narayana Rao as himself (guest appearance)

== Production ==
Mohan Babu wanted K. Raghavendra Rao to make a film with his son Manoj Manchu. Raghavendra Rao agreed under the condition that the film will be produced by Lakshmi Manchu.

== Soundtrack ==
Jhummandi Naadam

Soundtrack album by M. M. Keeravani
- Released: 28 May 2010 (India)
- Genre: Feature film soundtrack
- Label: Aditya Music
- Producer: M. M. Keeravani

M. M. Keeravani chronology
Vedam (2010)	Jhummandi Naadam (2010)	Maryada Ramanna (2010)

The soundtrack of the film was released worldwide on 28 May 2010. It had music scored by composer M. M. Keeravani. S. P. Balasubramanyam sang 5 songs.

No.	Title	Lyrics	Singer(s)	Length
1.	"Sarigamapadanee"	Vedavyasa	S.P.Balasubramanyam	4:43
2.	"Laali Paaduthunnadi"	Suddala Ashok Teja	S.P.Balasubramanyam, Geetha Madhuri, MK Balaji, Deepu	5:13
3.	"Govinda Harigovinda"	Vedavyasa	S.P.Balasubramanyam	2:30
4.	"Yem Sakkagunnavro"	Suddala Ashok Teja	Anuj Gurwara, Chaitra Ambadipudi
5.	"Sannayi Mrogindi"	Suddala Ashok Teja	S.P.Balasubramanyam, Sunitha Upadrashta, Malavika, Chaitra Ambadipudi	5:52
6.	"Deshamante"	Chandrabose	S.P.Balasubramanyam, Chaitra Ambadipudi, Mounika	5:00
7.	"Nigraham"	Chandrabose	Ranjith
8.	"Balamani"	Chandrabose	Karthik, Shivani
9.	"Entha Entha"	Chandrabose	Krishna Chaitanya, Sunitha Upadrashta

== Reception ==
A critic from Rediff.com wrote that "In short, Jhummandi Naadam has a stereotypical story. View it if you are an avid watcher of KRR's films". Jeevi of Idlebrain.com wrote that "On a whole, Jhummandi Naadam is a film that has something for every kind of audience". A critic from 123telugu wrote that "A lullaby song, a classical song, a Sankranthi song, a marriage song, a usual Raghavendra Rao song, a folk song and then a patriotic song – we have all seen each kind of song in different situations and different films. But to see them all in one film, and then get some laugh out loud situations guarantees a thorough and wholesome entertainment".
