= Classmates (2007 film) =

- DVD cover
- Directed by: K. Vijaya Bhaskar
- Screenplay by: K. Vijaya Bhaskar
- Dialogues by: Abburi Ravi
- Story by: James Albert
- Based on: Classmates by Lal Jose
- Produced by: Sravanthi Ravi Kishore
- Starring: Sumanth; Sadha; Sharwanand; Kamalinee Mukherjee; Ravi Varma; Sunil
- Cinematography: Hari Anumolu
- Edited by: A. Sreekar Prasad
- Music by: Koti
- Production company: Sri Sravanthi Movies
- Release date: 20 April 2007
- Country: India
- Language: Telugu

Classmates is a 2007 Indian Telugu-language coming-of-age film directed by K. Vijaya Bhaskar and produced by Sravanthi Ravi Kishore. A remake of the Malayalam film of the same name, it stars Sumanth, Sadha, Sharwanand, Kamalinee Mukherjee, Ravi Varma, and Sunil. The music was composed by Koti with cinematography by Hari Anumolu and editing by A. Sreekar Prasad. The film released on 20 April 2007.

== Plot ==
Ravi Kiran IAS, Murali, Rajeswari, Satish, Razia and Baddu were classmates and a group of friends in the 1990s. After several years, they all meet again at their 10-year reunion. Everyone is present except for Murali, who died during their last semester.

Back in college, Ravi was a firebrand leader of the left students wing, and Satish was his rival who headed the opposite faction of the students wing. Murali was a hardcore singer. Rajeswari was a classical dancer who regularly won awards for the college with her dance. After a brief friction, Ravi and Raaji become good friends and fall in love with each other. Satish, eager to rise up higher in politics, wants to marry Raaji, the daughter of a politician. He encourages Raaji to stand in the college elections, opposing Ravi, hoping to drive a wedge between the couple. He eventually succeeds in doing so during the college elections.

In an ensuing incident, Murali suddenly dies. Everybody thinks that he died of an asthmatic attack. Subsequently, Ravi abruptly drops out of college during their BSC final semester and leaves angrily without telling anyone, hoping to get a good job and become successful. He later clears his exams. Raaji thinks that Ravi left because of their ongoing conflict. Satish later confessed to Raaji that he was the person responsible for Ravi leaving the college and for separating Raaji from Ravi for his petty political gains. He also told to Raaji that Ravi was a good, friendly, and honest person and that she misunderstood him. She too dropped her studies and tried to find Ravi's whereabouts but failed. Ravi later went to Delhi to join for UPSC coaching classes since he had completed his exams, obtained his BSC degree, cleared the Civil Services Examination, and became an honest and successful IAS officer. On completing training, he joined the Maharashtra cadre as an Assistant Collector.

In the present, Ravi is a District Collector, moving successfully up in his career as a government officer, and remains a bachelor. He has almost completely forgotten his past and lives life on his own terms. He is very quiet, silent and very rarely talks to someone. His mother had died, and his sisters had been married off and are with their respective families. Baddu has gotten married and is settled in Dubai as a businessman. Sathish is now an MLA, while Rajeswari, still unmarried, continues her career as a classical dancer.

In the present, somebody tries to kill Ravi by strangulation. The police investigate but find no clue. The case becomes really serious since Ravi is a senior government official. Later it is revealed that Razia, the shy and reserved girl in the group, was the one responsible. Her reason is that she happens to overhear Raaji's confession to Ravi to forgive her for her past mistakes and Ravi's talk to Raaji, where Ravi learns that he himself was accidentally responsible for Murali's death, which was on a fateful night during the college elections. Razia and Murali were secretly lovers who decided to get married in the future, and her motivation was revenge.

On recovering from the hospital, Ravi and Razia subsequently reconcile. Later, Satish apologized to Ravi for his wrongdoings, and they become friends. Murali's father, the professor, later requests Ravi to accept Raaji as his wife as she had been waiting for him for the past 15 years. Raaji and Ravi decide to get married, and Ravi forgives Raaji for her mistakes, and they start loving each other once again. Once the truth is revealed, the entire group reconciles. They leave the college reunion happy, promising that they would all meet again. Ravi leaves in his car, and everyone bids goodbye to him. As Ravi leaves the campus, he sees Murali's spirit waving goodbye to him happily.

== Cast ==
- Sumanth as Ravi Kiran IAS, District Magistrate
- Sadha as Rajeshwari
- Sharwanand as Murali
- Kamalinee Mukherjee as Razia
- Ravi Varma as MLA Satish
- Sunil as Baddu
- Siva Reddy as Satish's friend
- Kota Srinivasa Rao as Murali's father
- Sudha as Murali's mother
- Giri Babu as Principal
- Tanikella Bharani as Hostel Warden
- Uttej as Hostel Boy
- Chitti Babu as Peon
- Karuna as Baddu's wife
- Ahuti Prasad
- Raghu Babu as Police Inspector
- Rajitha

== Soundtrack ==
The soundtrack was composed by Koti and all lyrics were written by Sirivennela Seetharama Sastry. The song "Gunde Chatuga" is based on "Ente Khalbile" from the Malayalam original.

Track list
No.	Title	Singer(s)	Length
1.	"Gunde Chatuga – Male"	Vedala Hemachandra	4:26
2.	"Naranallo"	Tippu	4:34
3.	"Mounamendhuku"	Mallikarjun, Anjana Sowmya	5:24
4.	"Boogolam"	Vedala Hemachandra, Sandeep, Kousalya	4:05
5.	"Gunde Chatuga – Female"	Chaitra Ambadipudi	4:26
Total length:			22:57

== Reception ==
Radhika Rajamani of Rediff gave the film a rating of two-and-a-half of out five stars and wrote that "Classmates is on a slightly different track from the ordinary but don't expect too much from it". Idlebrain wrote, "The plus points of the film are screenplay and the last 20 minutes. On the flip side, characterizations, style, pleasing music and youth-orientation is missing in the film". Sify wrote the film "does not come anywhere near its original and director Vijaybhaskar has not been able to keep the tempo going. The story is a nostalgic trip down memory lane but the screenplay and narration are slow with hardly anything to satisfy the younger generation".
