= Jaitra Yatra =

- Theatrical release poster
- Directed by: Uppalapati Narayana Rao
- Screenplay by: Uppalapati Narayana Rao
- Story by: Uppalapati Narayana Rao
- Dialogue by: Tanikella Bharani
- Produced by: Sravanthi Ravi Kishore
- Starring: Nagarjuna; Vijayashanti
- Cinematography: Hari Anumolu
- Edited by: A. Sreekar Prasad
- Music by: S. P. Balasubrahmanyam
- Production company: Sri Sravanthi Movies
- Release date: 13 November 1991
- Running time: 139 minutes
- Country: India
- Language: Telugu

Jaitra Yatra (transl. Journey to Victory) is a 1991 Telugu-language social problem film written and directed by Uppalapati Narayana Rao. It stars Nagarjuna and Vijayashanti, with music composed by S. P. Balasubrahmanyam. The film was produced by Sravanthi Ravi Kishore under the Sri Sravanthi Movies banner. Upon release, the film received positive reviews but failed at box-office. The film was dubbed in Tamil as Pongada Neengalum Unga Arasiyalum.

== Plot ==
Lawyer Aruna (Vijayashanti) witnesses a murder of popular MLA Rama Kotayya by a group led by Errodu (Banerjee) during early hours at Nehru Park, Hyderabad. However, due to political influence of Rama Kotayya's opponent and mafia leader (Nizhalgal Ravi), and the criminal police system, the group gets replaced during police custody by another unidentified group from a nearby settlement of illiterates and labourers. Aruna celebrates New Year's Eve with her boy friend Teja (Nagarjuna), an orphan, and also a lawyer raised by a hostel warden (Vijayachander). On that night Teja witnesses the warden offering Teja's photograph to a middle aged stranger (Delhi Ganesh).

The next morning Teja follows him to the settlement in the outskirts of Hyderabad. It is then revealed that the stranger is his real father who was a burglar and has abandoned Teja in his childhood. Teja also finds out that during his childhood, his mother was raped and killed by a criminal police in the settlement. Hence, Teja's father saves him by handling his responsibilities to the warden who would educate him and raise him as a good lawyer.

Teja gets to know that the settlement is subjected to several human rights violations, caste discrimination and atrocities by local politicians and cops who arrest innocent people like Bairagi (Chandramohan) with false accusations such as burglary and murder. Teja starts to live in the settlement, and protects the villagers from the atrocities of cops. Teja reaches out and negotiates talks with the district collector Satya Prakash to end these atrocities, but the collector fails in his promise due to political pressure and the mafia. Meanwhile, one of the sincere constable from the settlement Deeksheethulu kills a criminal sub inspector, however Teja intervenes and protects the constable from inquiry by another sub inspector phillips (Tanikella Bharani). How Teja, Aruna and their supporters manage to revolt against the system, and how the mafia leader (Nizhalgal Ravi) gets apprehended and punished forms the rest of the plot. Finally justice is served in the court of law.

== Cast ==
- Nagarjuna as Teja
- Vijayashanti as Lawyer Aruna
- Vijayachander as Hostel warden
- Chandramohan as Bairagi
- Tanikella Bharani as Phillips
- Delhi Ganesh
- Nizhalgal Ravi
- Krishna Bhagavaan
- Brahmaji
- Banerjee as Errodu
- Satya Prakash as District Collector
- Kakarla
- Vasanth
- Jaya Bhaskar
- Chandra Mouli
- Shanthi Lata
- Kamala Kamesh
- Anamika
- Priya
- Haritha
- Master Krishna
- Baby Revathy
- Baby Kamakshi

== Production ==
The film was initially titled Chirutapululu. The film marked the directorial debut of Uppalapatti Narayana Rao who earlier assisted Vamsy. The shooting was mostly done in Gundrayakuppam, Nagari, Puttur, Madanapally, Horsely Hills (climax) and in Hyderabad.

== Soundtrack ==
The film songs composed by S. P. Balasubrahmanyam. Music released on Lahari Audio Company.

No.	Title	Lyrics	Singer(s)	Length
1.	"Okkati Vachayi"	Vennelakanti	S. P. Balasubrahmanyam, Chitra	4:56
2.	"Needalle Vunna"	Sirivennela Sitarama Sastry	S. P. Balasubrahmanyam, S. P. Sailaja	5:04
3.	"Ennalamma Ennelamma"	Adrusta Deepak	S. P. Balasubrahmanyam	4:55
4.	"Parugu Theeyani"	Vennelakanti	S. P. Balasubrahmanyam, Chitra	4:27
5.	"Zero Zero Hourlo"	Sirivennela Sitarama Sastry	S. P. Balasubrahmanyam, Chitra	5:01
Total length:				24:45
