= Kida (film) =

- Theatrical release poster
- Directed by: Ra. Venkat
- Produced by: Sravanthi Ravi Kishore
- Starring: Kaali Venkat; Poo Ramu; Dileep
- Cinematography: M. Jayaprakash
- Edited by: Anand Geraldin
- Music by: Theeson
- Production company: Sri Sravanthi Movies
- Release date: 11 November 2023
- Running time: 123 mins
- Country: India
- Language: Tamil

Kida is a 2023 Indian Tamil-language drama film written and directed by Ra. Venkat. Produced by Sravanthi Ravi Kishore under the production banner Sri Sravanthi Movies, the film stars Kaali Venkat and Poo Ramu in the lead roles, and Dileep and Pandiyamma in supporting roles. The film was released theatrically on 11 November 2023.

== Cast ==
- Kaali Venkat as Vellachamy
- Poo Ramu as Chellaiya
- Dileep as Kathir
- Pandiyamma
- Lakshmi
- Loki
- Kamali
- Raju

== Production ==
Ra Venkat made his directorial debut through Kida after over 17 years of being in the film industry doing various jobs including as an office assistant and an associate director. Earlier in 2017, he had begun work on a film titled Kavari Maan Parambarai starring Vishnu Vishal and Shivani Rajashekar, before the project was dropped. Venkat later acquainted with Telugu film producer Sravanthi Ravi Kishore who produced the film, marking the first Tamil film of the production studio. The shoot was completed within 22 days.

Prior to the theatrical release of the film, it was selected to be screened in the Indian Panorama section at the International Film Festival of India (IFFI) in 2022. It was also later shown at various film festivals such as the Indian Film Festival of Melbourne, Jagran Film Festival, and the Chennai International Film Festival 2022.

== Release and reception ==
The film had a theatrical release on 11 November 2023 across Tamil Nadu. A critic from Times of India noted that "feel-goodness overcomes formulaic writing in Kida" and that "despite the simplistic making, and at times formulaic writing, director Ra Venkat manages to keep us invested in the proceedings because the problems faced by his protagonists are relatable". A reviewer from The Hindu also gave the film a positive review. A critic from South First wrote "the film appeals to you for its truthfulness" and that "there are no pretensions, no exaggerations, and no artificiality".
