= Shivam (2015 Telugu film) =

- Theatrical poster
- Directed by: Sreenivasa Reddy
- Screenplay by: Sreenivasa Reddy
- Dialogues by: Kishore Tirumala
- Story by: Sreenivasa Reddy
- Produced by: Sravanthi Ravi Kishore
- Starring: Ram Pothineni; Raashii Khanna
- Cinematography: Rasool Ellore
- Edited by: Madhu
- Music by: Devi Sri Prasad
- Production company: Sri Sravanthi Movies
- Release date: 2 October 2015
- Running time: 168 minutes
- Country: India
- Language: Telugu

Shivam is a 2015 Indian Telugu-language romantic action comedy film directed by Sreenivasa Reddy and produced by Sravanthi Ravi Kishore. The film is produced under Sri Sravanthi Movies banner. The film stars Ram Pothineni and Raashii Khanna.

== Plot ==
Shiva is a young and happy-go-lucky guy who supports love marriage and keeps helping couples to get married against their parents will. On one fine day, when he is in a train, he sees Tanu proposing to him loudly from the nearby field. Actually, Tanu was performing an act for her audition. Tanu's friend Rishitha told her acting was good, but asked to whom she proposed during the act. Misunderstood, Shiva jumps out from the train and starts approaching to Tanu, although she runs away. Shiva finally follows Tanu in a school. Tanu was doing a rehearsal for her acting in theatre. He thought that Tanu fell in love with him. But she continuously rejects him. He arranges his friend Rishi's marriage to her lover and asks Tanu to turn back if she loves him; otherwise, he will stay out of her life.

But Bhoji Reddy's men come to beat him because he had beaten up his son. He says that if she turns back, he would beat them up; if she doesn't, he would come with them. Eventually, Abhi, who was looking for Shiva, takes Tanu with him. Shiva beats them up after a man says that she turned back. Abhi reveals that Tanu was always lucky for him and wants to marry her. Shiva takes her away at her wedding, leaving a fight between Abhi and Bhoji. They both unite and search for Shiva.

Tanu and Shiva go to Goa. In that time, Tanu falls for him. When she is about to propose to him, he fights with some goons to make two lovers unite. As he is seriously wounded, she asks him either she or they. Shiva eventually supports them, which makes her emotional. Bhoji kidnaps her. Shiva's father reveals that his son's real name is Ram. Ram and Shiva were best friends, until Shiva committed suicide. Enraged, Ram learns that he loved a girl who also committed suicide. He hid this because Ram would risk his life to get them married. After hearing this, Tanu realizes her mistake, Bhoji too gives up, and Abhi goes through memory loss. As the film ends on a happy note, Tanu meets Shiva/Ram at a mall, proposes to him, which Ram/Shiva accepts, and they live happily together.

== Cast ==
- Ram Pothineni as Shiva / Ram
- Raashii Khanna as Tanu
- Abhimanyu Singh as Abhi
- Brahmanandam as Tiger Bhai/Shiva's Uncle
- Vineet Kumar as Bhoji Reddy
- Jaya Prakash Reddy as Bhoji Reddy's brother-in-law
- Posani Krishna Murali as Shiva's father
- Mano as Tanu's father
- Srinivasa Reddy as Ramakrishna, Shiva's friend
- Satyam Rajesh as Shiva's friend
- Himaja as Rishitha, Tanu's friend
- Nagineedu as Krishna Murthy
- Krishna Bhagavan as IPod Shastry
- Shafi as Mustafa
- Saptagiri as Happy
- Fish Venkat as Fish
- Pankaj Kesari as Peddi Reddy
- Naresh
- Amit Tiwari
- Madhunandan as Balkrishna "Balki"
- Surekha Vani
- Appaji Ambarisha Darbha as Inspector general of police

== Music ==
Shivam

Soundtrack album by Devi Sri Prasad
- Released: Sep 12, 2015
- Recorded: 2015
- Genre: Soundtrack
- Length: 17:27
- Label: Aditya Music
- Producer: Devi Sri Prasad

Devi Sri Prasad chronology
Puli (2015)	Shivam (2015)	Kumari 21F (2015)

Devi Sri Prasad has scored the music for the soundtrack. The audio launched on 12 September 2015 and Aditya Music purchased the audio rights. All Lyrics were penned by Bhaskarabhatla Ravi Kumar.

Track listing
No.	Title	Singer(s)	Length
1.	"Shivam Shivam"	Karthik	3:33
2.	"Prema Ane Picchi"	Narendra	2:56
3.	"I Love You Too"	Yazin Nizar, Sameera	3:50
4.	"Andamaina Lokam"	Sagar, Haripriya	3:59
5.	"Gunde Aagi Potaandhe"	Hemachandra, M. M. Manasi	3:09
Total length:			17:27

== Reception ==
The film received mixed to negative reviews from critics. Pranita Jonnalagedda of The Times of India gave the film a rating of 2.5/5 and wrote "The only saving grace in this film are the songs which picturised very well. All in all the film is extremely lengthy, too ordinary and very boring". Suresh Kavirayani of Deccan Chronicle gave the film a rating of 2.5/5 and wrote "The songs, some of which have been shot exceptionally well in lovely locations, provide relief in an otherwise ordinary film". Sangeetha Devi Dundoo of The Hindu stated "The film is lengthy, boring and comedy isn’t enough to save the day".
