= Endukante Premanta =

2012 film by A. Karunakaran

- Theatrical release poster
- Directed by: A. Karunakaran
- Written by: A. Karunakaran
- Produced by: Sravanthi Ravi Kishore
- Starring: Ram Pothineni; Tamannaah Bhatia
- Cinematography: I. Andrew
- Edited by: Kotagiri Venkateswara Rao
- Music by: G. V. Prakash Kumar
- Production company: Sri Sravanthi Movies
- Release date: 8 June 2012
- Running time: 155 minutes
- Country: India
- Language: Telugu

Endukante Premanta (transl. Because It's Love) is a 2012 Indian Telugu-language fantasy romantic comedy film written and directed by A. Karunakaran. Its a remake of a 2005 Hollywood movie Just Like Heaven. Produced by Sravanthi Ravi Kishore, the film stars Ram Pothineni and Tamannaah Bhatia. It features music scored by G. V. Prakash Kumar and dialogues by Kona Venkat. The film was released theatrically on 8 June 2012.

The film deals with love between two souls across two different eras. Both Ram and Tamannaah play dual roles in the film, with each of those pairs of roles set in 1980 and 2012, respectively. This film's plot is based on the American film Just like Heaven (2005). Endukante Premanta was simultaneously shot in Tamil as Yen Endral Kadhal Enben (transl. Because I'II Say It's Love), though the Tamil version never saw a theatrical release.

== Plot ==
In Vizag, 1980 : Krishna is in love with Srinidhi, and has been standing outside her college bus stop everyday for three years, hoping she would look at him. Srinidhi also likes Krishna but does not reveal it, as she fears that by doing so, she may put her family in trouble. On the last day of the college, Krishna decides to propose to her, so he disguises himself in a burqa and boards the bus. The bus gets involved in an accident, and Krishna saves Srinidhi from the mishap but is killed in the process. Shocked about Krishna's death, Srinidhi dies at his grave, regretting her decision to never look at him.

In Paris, 2012 : Sravanthi, daughter of the Indian Ambassador to France and a medical student, is leading a stifling life due to her father's security around her, and craves freedom. She fantasizes an unidentified person in her dream every day, and she promises to marry him if her dream comes true, whoever he may be. One day, escapes from her home and goes on a tour of the whole countryside with her friends.

Ram is a happy-go-lucky guy who is a headache to his father as he does not take life seriously. In an effort to teach him hard work, his father tricks him and sends him to Paris for a job, which he arranges through his friend Pulla Reddy without Ram's knowledge. Ram tries to escape from the factory he works in, and when doing so, sees Sravanthi standing on a railing of the bridge over a river, and, thinking she's about to commit suicide, forces her to get down. Ram and Sravanthi get acquainted and make a plan to leave for India. However, at the airport, he is not able to find Sravanthi and leaves for India alone. After reaching India, he finds Sravanthi to his surprise at the airport. She tells him to meet a specific doctor in a specific hospital and disappears. On meeting the doctor, he finds Sravanthi in the hospital ICU. Sravanthi reveals that Ram has been talking to her soul. She went into a coma after an accident, which was a part of conspiracy hatched by DK, her dad's chief security officer. Only Ram can see and hear her, owing to their previous lives.

Ram realises he has to protect Sravanthi's body to keep her safe. He takes her to his aunt's hospital, where she tells him that Sravanthi needs a German medicine to survive - this medicine has to be given in three doses at exactly the same time (every two days), and not doing so would be fatal. After multiple failed attempts to kidnap Sravanthi's body, DK gets hold of Ram when he goes to get the last dose of medicine. After a fight, Sravanthi is given the third and last dose but DK messes with her oxygen supply. Ram manages to save her - however, when she wakes up, she doesn't remember Ram. Ram is heartbroken.

When Sravanthi and her father are prepared to go back to Paris, their car tyre gets punctured. Sravanthi finds herself at the same location her dream took place and sees Ram as the mystery man. Surprised, she moves forward and, when their hands touch, she remembers everything. The film ends with her hugging him.

== Cast ==
- Ram Pothineni in a dual role as
  - Ram
  - Krishna
- Tamannaah Bhatia in a dual role as
  - Sravanthi
  - Srinidhi
- Rishi as DK, Security Officer and Jayasurya’s assistant
- Suman as Jayasurya, Sravanthi's father and the Indian Ambassador to France
- Sayaji Shinde as Krishna Rao, Ram's father
- Y. Kasi Viswanath as Madhav, Sravanthi's house chef
- Anu Hasan as Dr Revathi, Ram's aunt and Krishna Rao’s sister
- Krishna Bhagavan as Ram’s uncle
- Sivannarayana Naripeddi as Ram’s uncle
- Rajitha as Ram’s aunt
- Shankar Melkote as Ram’s grandfather
- Kalpika Ganesh as Ramya, Ram’s cousin
- Kona Venkat as Koka Bhai, the Indian agent of DK
- Brahmanandam as Pandu Ranga Rao
- Satya Krishnan as Dr Savitha, Sravanthi’s doctor
- Nagineedu as Pulla Reddy, Ram’s father’s friend
- Raghu Babu as Johnny, Pulla Reddy’s assistant
- Suman Setty as Kumar
- Gundu Sudarshan as Journalist
- Dharmavarapu Subramanyam as Hospital Chief

== Production ==
The film was to be originally produced by Paruchuri Prasad. However, he backed out in the last minute due to budget constraints. Sravanthi Ravi Kishore and Ram decided to do the film "at any cost as this script has the potential to be made as a bilingual". The shooting of the movie started at the end of July 2011 and it took the crew of the film 118 days to complete. The film was shot in Geneva, Switzerland and France over a period of 60 days. The film was shot simultaneously in Tamil and was named Yen Endral Kadhal Enben, with each scene shot twice. This was to have been Ram's debut film in Tamil. Ram had to learn gymnastics to shoot for a song which delayed the shoot for two months. Kona Venkat, who is the dialogue writer for the film, made his debut in this film as one of the antagonists. "After narrating the dialogues of my character", says Venkat, Karunakaran was convinced that "he could only see me and insisted that I do it". Rishi was selected to play the character of DK, a security commander and the main antagonist, in the film. "This is a new dimension, as a villain I missed dancing with the heroines but I believe that a villain should have a strong aim" says Rishi.

== Music ==
Endukante Premanta

Soundtrack album by G. V. Prakash Kumar
- Released: 29 April 2012
- Recorded: 2012
- Genre: Film soundtrack
- Length: 25:01
- Label: Aditya Music
- Producer: G. V. Prakash Kumar

G. V. Prakash Kumar chronology
Muppozhudhum Un Karpanaigal (2011)	Endukante Premanta (2012)	Saguni (2012)

G. V. Prakash Kumar composed the soundtrack, which received positive response. The audio of the film was released on 29 April 2012 and launch of the audio was held at Annapurna Studios on the same day. Musicperk rated it 7.5/10 quoting "A refreshing musical album which is cool, lovely, soft, breezy, lively and yet trendy".

Tracklist
No.	Title	Lyrics	Singer(s)	Length
1.	"Chill Out"	Ramajogayya Sastry	Vijay Prakash, Andrea Jeremiah, BigNik, Maya	5:05
2.	"Nee Choopule"	Ramajogayya Sastry	K. S. Chithra, Haricharan	6:02
3.	"Kikko Gicko"	Ramajogayya Sastry	Krish, Ranina Reddy, Rahul Nambiar, Maya	4:23
4.	"Cinderella"	Srimani	Benny Dayal, Megha, Rahul Nambiar	4:29
5.	"Yegiri Pove"	Ramajogayya Sastry	Chinmayi Sripaada, Hemachandra	5:02
Total length:				25:01

== Release ==
Endukante Premanta received a U certificate from the Central Board of Film Certification without cuts. It was scheduled to release on 11 May 2012. But release was postponed as it coincided with the release date of Gabbar Singh. The film was finally released worldwide on 8 June 2012. In the United States, it was distributed by 14 Reels Entertainment.

== Reception ==
The film mostly received mixed reviews. Idlebrain.com didn't give any rating for the film but criticised that the "screenplay is not gripping, romance feel is ineffective and run-time is excessive for this kind of subject". Rediff.com has given a rating of 1.5 out of a scale of 5 for the film and declared that "Endukante Premanta disappoints". It criticised the script for its "loopholes" but praised the lead pair of Ram and Tamannaah as the "heart and soul of the film". The Times of India rated the film at 2.5/5 and said that the film is "overall, a very underwhelming experience that only comes off in bits and pieces". The Hindu criticised the film to be "like a montage of different films" and director for "throwing logic to the wind", but praised the lead pair of the film for having "done their best to bring some semblance of reality to this fantasy". CNN-IBN too felt that the film "is far from being perfect" and that "the climax is not one bit convincing". However it praised the cast for its performance and the director for his "bold experiment".
