= Malvika Sharma =

Indian actress

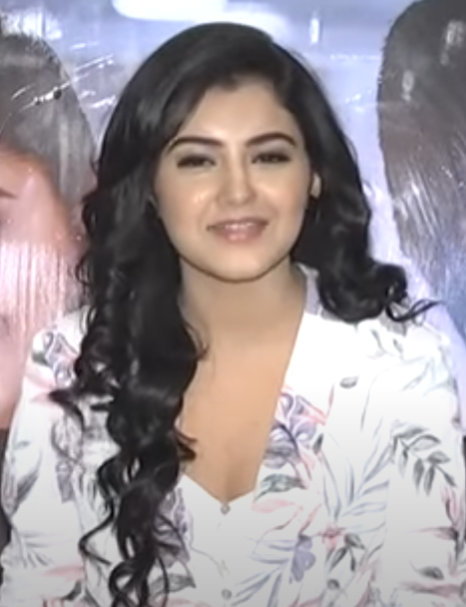
- Sharma in 2018
- Born: 26 January 2000 (age 26); Mumbai, Maharashtra, India
- Occupations: Actress; model; advocate
- Years active: 2018 - present

Malvika Sharma is an Indian actress and model who works in Telugu, Tamil and Malayalam films. She is a qualified advocate. Sharma made her debut with Nela Ticket(2018) and Malayalam debut in Khalifa: The Ruler.

== Personal life ==
She graduated from Rizvi Law College with a Bachelor of Laws degree with specialization in criminology. She is also pursuing a career in Law.

== Filmography ==
=== Films ===
Key
†	Denotes films that have not yet been released

Year	Title	Role	Language	Notes	Ref.
2018	Nela Ticket	Malvika	Telugu	Telugu debut	
2021	Red	Mahima	Telugu		
2022	Coffee with Kadhal	Diya	Tamil	Tamil debut	
2024	Bhimaa	Vidya	Telugu		
2024	Harom Hara	Devi	Telugu		
2026	Khalifa: The Ruler	Fiza Ali	Malayalam	Malayalam debut	
2026	Brindavihari †	Meera	Kannada	Kannada debut	
