= Poo Ramu =

Indian journalist and actor (1962–2022)

- Born: 1962
- Died: 27 June 2022 (aged 59–60); Chennai, India
- Occupation: Actor

Poo Ramu (1962 – 27 June 2022) was an Indian actor who appeared in Tamil language films as a supporting actor.

== Career ==
Ramu was a member of the Tamil Nadu Progressive Writers’ Association, and from 1990 to 2005, Ramu was a part of the theatre group Chennai Kalai Kuzhu.

Ramu began his acting career as a street theatre artiste, reprising a role as a theatre actor in the "Naatukoru Seithi Solla" song as a part of his film debut Anbe Sivam (2003). He garnered acclaim in the film industry for his role in the critically acclaimed 2008 film Poo by Sasi. He subsequently took on the name of the film as his stagename, and later went on to notably feature in Neerparavai (2012), Pariyerum Perumal (2018) and Nedunalvaadai (2019).

== Death ==
Ramu died on 27 June 2022 aged 60. He had been admitted to the Rajiv Gandhi Government General Hospital in Chennai, after he had a cardiac arrest during the previous week.

== Filmography ==
- Anbe Sivam (2003)
- Maayavi (2005)
- Thavamai Thavamirundhu (2005)
- Poo (2008)
- Nanban (2012)
- Neerparavai (2012)
- Madhubana Kadai (2012)
- Thanga Meenkal (2013)
- Jilla (2014)
- Kaadu (2014)
- Thilagar (2015) as Ukkirapandi
- Sivappu (2015)
- Vellaiya Irukiravan Poi Solla Maatan (2015)
- Kandadhai Sollugiren (2016)
- Peranbu (2018)
- Mersal (2017)
- Pariyerum Perumal (2018)
- Nedunalvaadai (2019)
- Kanne Kalaimaane (2019)
- Soorarai Pottru (2020)
- Ka Pae Ranasingam (2020)
- Karnan (2021)
- Kodiyil Oruvan (2021)
- Rocky (2021)
- Onaan (2021)
- Anbulla Ghilli (2022)
- Nanpakal Nerathu Mayakkam (2023) (Malayalam)
- Idam Porul Yaeval (TBA)
- Kida (2023)
- Thuritham (2023)
- Rajni (2023) (also in Malayalam)
