= Ela Cheppanu =

- Directed by: B.V. Ramana
- Story by: Anubhav Sinha
- Produced by: Sravanthi Ravi Kishore
- Starring: Tarun; Shriya Saran; Siva Balaji
- Cinematography: Hari Anumolu
- Music by: Koti
- Production company: Sri Sravanthi Movies
- Release date: 2 October 2003
- Running time: 169 minutes
- Country: India
- Language: Telugu

Ela Cheppanu (transl. How Should I Say?) is a 2003 Indian Telugu-language film starring Tharun, Shriya Saran, and Siva Balaji. The film was directed by B.V. Ramana. It is the remake of the Bollywood film Tum Bin. The film released to mixed reviews and was a box office failure.

== Plot ==
Sekhar is a highly respected and talented businessman. At a party, he meets a Germany-based businessman named Amar Varma, who is the manager of Varma Industries. They share a discussion and become friends, learning about one another. Amar has come to India for his wedding with his childhood sweetheart Priya. That night, Sekhar and his friend Sunil are driving while they unfortunately meet with an accident, in which Amar is killed. Sekhar is overriden by guilt and tries to relieve himself, so he decides to leave for Germany along with Sunil. Upon Amar's death, Varma Industries is on the verge of collapse. Amar's fiancée Priya is devastated, Amar's dad is in shock and unresponsive towards others, while Amar's sister and grandmother are in mourning. The police inspector who is investigating the case is determined to find the person responsible for the accident despite his superiors' indifference towards the case.

Sekhar meets Amar's family by introducing himself as Amar's friend. He offers to re-build and restore Varma Industries without any compensation, stating Amar met him in India and offered him a job before his death. He is given the chance and goes about the uphill task of making the company viable again. Gradually, Sekhar heals the gaping wound left in the Varma family by Amar's death and they come to accept him as one of the family. What none of them know — except for Sunil — is that it was Sekhar's jeep that accidentally had hit Amar after he swerved to avoid hitting an innocent girl who had walked on to the road, causing his death. Ridden by guilt Sekhar came to Germany to confess, ask for forgiveness, and do whatever he can for the family.

Abhi is a wealthy Germany industrialist who meets Priya and realizes that she is the right woman for him. He is considering proposing to Priya and helping to rebuild Varma Industries. But Priya has fallen in love with Sekhar. Eventually, a conflict arises between Priya and Sekhar regarding a proposition made by Abhi to take over Varma Industries. Sekhar realizes that Priya does not need his help anymore and decides to return to India.

Priya stops Sekhar while he boards his flight and confesses her feelings for him. Sekhar denies his feelings and boards the plane. Devastated, Priya goes home and gets engaged to Abhi. At the airport arrives inspector, from India in search of the person who killed Amar, and arrests Sekhar. They wait, with Sunil, to board the next flight to India. Sekhar calls Priya and tells her how much he loves her and confesses that it was he who hit her fiancé. While talking to Priya, Shekhar meets with an accident.

Priya feels guilty about falling for the man who caused Amar's death and confesses it to Amar's father, who surprises her by speaking for the first time after his son's death. He tells her that Sekhar had told him the truth when he first visited them and he believes Sekhar. Amar's family then makes Priya realize how much Sekhar has done for the family and that he is like Amar to them. Sunil informs them about Sekhar's accident. Abhi tells a skeptical Priya to go back to Sekhar as he is her true love. Meanwhile, Inspector who is in the hospital with everyone, understands that the family needs Sekhar more than the law does and simply closes the case and leaves. The movie ends with Sekhar recovering and uniting with Priya while Abhi is left devastated and is comforted by his uncle.

== Cast ==
- Tarun as Sekhar
- Shriya as Priya
- Siva Balaji as Amar Varma
- Sunil as Sunil
- Brahmanandam as Brahmaji
- Kovai Sarala as Sarala
- Suhani Kalita as Mili, Amar's sister
- Vijayachander as Amar's father
- Tanikella Bharani as Police Inspector
- Abhi as Abhiram
- Giri Babu as James, Abhiram's uncle
- Sowcar Janaki as Amar's grandmother
- Gundu Sudarshan as Buchi Babu
- Hanish
- Baby Zeeba
- Ruthika in a special appearance

== Production ==
Ela Cheppanu was partly filmed in Germany.

== Soundtrack ==
The music and background score was composed by Koti. The soundtrack album consisted of 8 tracks.. All the lyrics were written by Sirivennela Sitarama Sastry.

Track listing
| No. | Title | Singer(s) | Length |
|---|---|---|---|
| 1. | "Rangula Taaraka" | Karthik & Sunitha Upadrashta | 4:58 |
| 2. | "Ee Kshanam Oke Oka" | K. S. Chithra | 4:38 |
| 3. | "Aa Navvulo Emundo" | Karthik | 5:10 |
| 4. | "Meghala Pallakilona" | Sriram Prabhu, Sunitha | 4:33 |
| 5. | "Maaghamaasa Vella" | Udit Narayan, Shreya Ghoshal | 6:06 |
| 6. | "Manninchu Oo Prema" | Udit Narayan, K. S. Chithra | 5:39 |
| 7. | "Manchu Taakina" | Mallikarjun | 4:47 |
| 8. | "Prati Nijam" | K. S. Chithra | 4:47 |

== Reception ==
Jeevi of Idlebrain.com wrote that "First half of the film is good. Second half is little slow. The climax of the film is dragged by three hops, because all the characters need to be given a logical finishing". A critic from Full Hyderabad wrote that "Overall, though, Ela Cheppanu comes as a damp remake for people who've seen Tum Bin". Telugu Cinema wrote "The Sravanthi Movies team succeeded in making a good movie, but the second half is not handled properly. The climax is predictable and some scenes give a deja vu feeling. The director lost grip on the tempo of the movie just before the climax".
