= Balarama Krishnulu =

- Theatrical release poster
- Directed by: Ravi Raja Pinisetty
- Written by: Tanikella Bharani (dialogues)
- Screenplay by: Ravi Raja Pinisetty
- Story by: Erode Soundar
- Produced by: Sunkara Madhu Murali
- Starring: Shobhan Babu; Rajasekhar; Jagapati Babu; Ramya Krishna
- Cinematography: Vijay
- Edited by: Vemuri Ravi
- Music by: Raj–Koti
- Production companies: Vinnela Art Productions
- Distributed by: Sri Sravanthi Movies
- Release date: 7 November 1992
- Running time: 139 minutes
- Country: India
- Language: Telugu

Balarama Krishnulu is a 1992 Telugu-language drama film directed by Ravi Raja Pinisetty, who also wrote the screenplay. The film stars Sobhan Babu, Rajasekhar, Jagapathi Babu and Ramya Krishna. The film is a remake of the Tamil movie Cheran Pandiyan (1991). It was a box office success.

== Plot ==
The film begins in a village where a family feud upholds between the siblings Balaramaiah & Krishna Murthy, the arbitrators and forefronts. Balaramaiah is a cohere to grounds of caste. Thus, he ostracizes his half-brother, Krishna Murthy, and sister, Seeta, getting hold of the exploitation of his sly, distant relative, Chintamani. Since their mother belongs to the lower tier, they share the same compound of their ancestors' property where Balaramaiah resides with his benevolent wife Vasumati & daughter Pooja. Vasumati is propitious towards Krishna Murthy's family and shows her affection for them.

Meanwhile, Shivaji, the cousin of Krishna Murthy, lands whom he shelters. Time being, Shivaji falls for Pooja. Once, Antharvedi, the debauchery son of Chitamani, tries to molest Pooja, and Krishna Murthy secures her. Chintamani utilizes it for polarization and raises the issue to the panchayat. Krishna Murthy stays silent to protect his brother's honor and receives a penalty. Simultaneously, he faces the music when Balaramaiah spoils Seeta's match, claiming them as illicit progeny. Above all, he blackballs him in their father's ceremony. However, Krishna Murthy thresholds the pain with patience.

Concurrently, a liquor contractor, Nukkuraju, approaches the village to set up his business, which both the brothers hinder, and he is inflamed. At the same time, Chintamani puts forward a wedding proposal for Pooja & Antharvedi when Balaramaiah kicks him out. So, as envied, he mingles with Nukka Raju and has been waiting for a shot. In the interim, Balaramaiah & Krishna Murthy discover the love affair of Shivaji & Pooja. At this juncture, enraged Balaramaiah seeks to kill Pooja, but Vasumathi pauses him. Parallelly, Krishna Murthy vows to unite the two birds and wipe off anyone who stands in the way. Now Balaramaiah casts around the matches for Pooja, which Chintamani spoils. Hence, he decides to knit his daughter with Anthatvedi. The crafty makes Balaramaiah a puppet from there and forces him to approve of Nukkaraju's business. Further, he tries to grab their honorable family heritage temple authority, but Krishna Murthy bars it.

During that dilemma, Shivaji & Pooja attempt to flee. Spotting it, Balaramaiah affirms his daughter has been dead. Accordingly, Krishna Murthy chooses to do the marriage of the twosome. At that point, enraged Nukkaraju & Chintamani abduct when Seeta is seriously injured. Knowing it, Krishna Murthy and Shivaji move to her rescue. Despite this, Balaramaiah stays tough when Vasumathi uprisings him and breaks out several truths he is unaware of. Being conscious, Balaramaiah realizes his mistake, embraces his sister, and protects his brothers from the blaggards. Finally, the movie ends on a happy note with the family's reunion.

== Cast ==
- Sobhan Babu as Balaramaiah
- Rajashekhar as Krishna Murthy
- Jagapati Babu as Shivaji
- Ramya Krishna as Laliltha
- Gollapudi Maruthi Rao as Chintamani
- Rami Reddy as Nukaraju
- Tanikella Bharani as Antharvedi
- Brahmanandam
- Babu Mohan
- Maharshi Raghava as Raghava
- Srividya as Vasumathi
- Rajeevi as Pooja
- Kalpana as Seeta
- Disco Shanti as Dappula Kasthuri
- Juttu Narasimhan
- Gadiraju Subba Rao

== Soundtrack ==
Balaramakrishnulu

Film score by Raj–Koti
- Released: 1992
- Genre: Soundtrack
- Length: 20:10
- Label: SURYA Audio
- Producer: Raj–Koti

Raj–Koti chronology
Peddarikam (1992)	Balaramakrishnulu (1992)	Bangaru Bullodu (1993)

Music composed by Raj–Koti. Music released on SURYA Audio Company.

No.	Title	Lyrics	Singer(s)	Length
1.	"Veedemi Moguduro"	Veturi	S. P. Balasubrahmanyam, Chitra	3:28
2.	"Nee Vayassulo"	Veturi	S. P. Balasubrahmanyam, Chitra	4:23
3.	"Ammammo"	Sirivennela Sitarama Sastry	S. P. Balasubrahmanyam, Chitra	3:55
4.	"Paga Paga"	Sirivennela Sitarama Sastry	S. P. Balasubrahmanyam	3:59
5.	"Mastugunnaadi"	Nandigama Gani	Malgudi Subha	4:25
Total length:				20:10
