= Ramajogayya Sastry =

Indian film lyricist

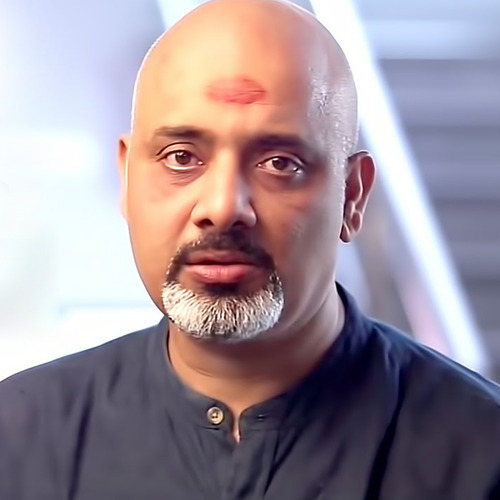
- Born: 24 August 1970 (age 56); Narasaraopet, Andhra Pradesh, India
- Education: REC Warangal; IIT Kharagpur
- Occupation: Lyricist
- Years active: 2004 – present

Darivemula Ramajogayya Sastry (born 24 August 1970) is an Indian film lyricist, known for his works in Telugu cinema and music.

== Early life ==
Ramajogayya Sastry was born in Arepalli Muppalla, Ipuru Mandal near Narasaraopet of Palnadu district. His father, Suryaprakasa Rao, was a priest and agriculturist and his mother, Saraswatamma, is a housewife. He did his B.Tech from NIT Warangal and M.Tech from IIT Kharagpur.

== Career ==
He was working as a metallurgical engineer at Bengaluru when his career as a lyricist began. He worked in GE India Business Center in Secunderabad.

=== Career as a lyricist ===
Sastry penned lyrics for over a hundred films in Telugu and is a famous lyricist in Andhra Pradesh. He is popular for his peppy and catchy lyrics, while he has frequently shown his ability to write lyrics for more serious situations in films. He fancied becoming a singer.

He first penned lyrics for a Kannada film. Film Star V. Ravichandran introduced him to Krishna Vamsi who in turn introduced him to Sirivennela Seetharama Sastry. Upon Sastry's request, Seetharama Sastry accepted him as his protégé thus enabling him to hone his lyric-writing skills. Sastry first penned lyrics for the movie Yuvasena, a remake of the Malayalam film 4 The People. He got Rs.20,000 as first remuneration for his two songs in the film.

Actor-producer Mohan Babu and film director Srinu Vaitla offered Sastry to work in many of their films before he rose to stardom with the song "Om Namaste Bolo" (Telugu: ఓం నమస్తే బోలో) in the film Ready. He won Filmfare award for the devotional song Sadaasiva Sanyaasii! (Telugu: సదాశివ సన్యాసీ!) from the film Khaleja.

He played a short and uncredited role in King as a music assistant for a music director Jayasurya played by Brahmanandam.

He won a music award from the Telugu channel Star Maa for lyrics of the song "Apple Beauty" from the movie Janatha Garage. He also penned the title song Jayaho Janatha for the same movie which was released in 2016. He then worked for Pawan Kalyan's Katamarayudu title song "Mira Mira Meesam" for which Anup Rubens composed the soundtrack.

== Filmography ==
| Year | Film | Notes |
|---|---|---|
| 2008 | Ontari | |
| 2008 | King | |
| 2009 | Sankham | |
| 2009 | Ek Niranjan | |
| 2009 | Billa | |
| 2009 | Malli Malli | |
| 2010 | Manmadha Banam | Dubbed version |
| 2010 | Shubhapradam | |
| 2010 | Maryada Ramanna | |
| 2010 | Don Seenu | |
| 2010 | Khaleja | Won— Filmfare Award for Best Lyricist – Telugu |
| 2010 | Brindavanam | |
| 2010 | Baava | |
| 2010 | Kalyanram Kathi | |
| 2010 | Ragada | |
| 2011 | Aha Naa Pellanta | |
| 2011 | Shakti | 4 songs |
| 2011 | Theenmaar | |
| 2011 | Mr. Perfect | |
| 2011 | 100% Love | |
| 2011 | Veera | |
| 2011 | Dhada | |
| 2011 | Kandireega | |
| 2011 | Dookudu | |
| 2011 | Madatha Kaja | |
| 2011 | Oosaravelli | |
| 2011 | Mogudu | |
| 2011 | Solo | |
| 2011 | Panjaa | |
| 2011 | Adhurs | |
| 2011 | Badrinath | |
| 2012 | Eega | Nominated—SIIMA Award for Best Lyricist (Telugu) |
| 2012 | Endukante... Premanta! | |
| 2012 | Damarukam | |
| 2012 | Sudigadu | |
| 2012 | Julayi | |
| 2012 | Mr. Nokia | |
| 2012 | Bodyguard | |
| 2013 | Iddarammayilatho | |
| 2013 | Baadshah | |
| 2013 | Mirchi | |
| 2013 | Attharintiki Daaredhi | |
| 2013 | Vishwaroopam | Dubbed version |
| 2014 | Legend | |
| 2015 | Cheekati Rajyam | 1 song |
| 2015 | Bruce Lee – The Fighter | |
| 2015 | Bhale Bhale Magadivoy | |
| 2015 | Baahubali: The Beginning | |
| 2015 | Raghuvaran B.tech | |
| 2015 | S/O Satyamurthy | |
| 2015 | Srimanthudu | |
| 2016 | Majnu | |
| 2016 | Janatha Garage | Nominated—IIFA Utsavam Best Lyricist |
| 2016 | Oka Manasu | |
| 2016 | A Aa | |
| 2016 | Supreme | |
| 2016 | Sarrainodu | |
| 2016 | Eedo Rakam Aado Rakam | |
| 2016 | Sardaar Gabbar Singh | |
| 2016 | Oopiri | |
| 2016 | Seethamma Andalu Ramayya Sitralu | |
| 2016 | Soggade Chinni Nayana | |
| 2016 | Nenu Sailaja | |
| 2016 | Dictator | |
| 2017 | Aakatayi | |
| 2017 | Jaya Janaki Nayaka | |
| 2017 | Om Namo Venkatesaya | |
| 2017 | Spyder | |
| 2017 | Duvvada Jagannadham | |
| 2017 | Jai Lava Kusa | |
| 2017 | Oye Ninne | |
| 2017 | Khaidi No. 150 | |
| 2018 | KGF: Chapter 1 | Dubbed version |
| 2018 | Sammohanam | |
| 2018 | Mahanati | |
| 2018 | Naa Peru Surya | |
| 2018 | Bharat Ane Nenu | |
| 2018 | Aravinda Sametha Veera Raghava | |
| 2018 | Savyasachi | |
| 2018 | Amar Akbar Anthony | |
| 2018 | Next Enti? | |
| 2018 | Vishwaroopam II | Dubbed version |
| 2019 | Donga | |
| 2019 | Viswasam | Dubbed version |
| 2019 | Vinaya Vidheya Rama | |
| 2019 | Mr. KK | Dubbed version |
| 2020 | Yuvarathnaa | Dubbed version |
| 2020 | Sarileru Neekevvaru | |
| 2020 | Ala Vaikunthapurramuloo | |
| 2021 | Gaali Sampath | |
| 2021 | Raja Vikramarka | |
| 2021 | Thalaivii | Dubbed version |
| 2021 | Intiki Deepam Illalu | TV series |
| 2021 | Naga Bhairavi | TV series |
| 2021 | Vakeel Saab | |
| 2021 | Krack | |
| 2022 | Ori Devuda | |
| 2022 | Aa Ammayi Gurinchi Meeku Cheppali | |
| 2022 | Godfather | 4 songs |
| 2022 | Captain | Dubbed version |
| 2022 | Prince | Dubbed version |
| 2022 | Acharya | |
| 2022 | K.G.F: Chapter 2 | Dubbed version |
| 2022 | Ghani | |
| 2022 | RRR | |
| 2022 | Bheemla Nayak | |
| 2023 | Custody | 4 songs; co-lyricist for one song |
| 2023 | Veera Simha Reddy | |
| 2023 | Ponniyin Selvan: II | Dubbed Version; 2 songs only |
| 2024 | Game Changer | |
| 2024 | Srikakulam Sherlock Holmes | |
| 2024 | Kali | |
| 2024 | Lucky Baskhar | |
| 2024 | The Greatest of All Time | Dubbed version |
| 2024 | Purushothamudu | |
| 2024 | Committee Kurrollu | |
| 2024 | Paarijatha Parvam | |
| 2024 | Devara: Part 1 | |
| 2024 | Amaran | Dubbed version; 2 songs only |
| 2024 | Siddharth Roy | |
| 2024 | Guntur Kaaram | Won— Filmfare Award for Best Lyricist – Telugu |
| 2025 | Love OTP | |
| 2025 | Dude | Dubbed version |
| 2025 | Sankranthiki Vasthunam | |
| 2025 | Oka Brundavanam | |
| 2025 | Return of the Dragon | Dubbed version |
| 2025 | Dear Uma | |
| 2025 | Mazaka | |
| 2025 | Racharikam | |
| 2025 | Ramam Raghavam | |
| 2026 | Vishnu Vinyasam | |
| 2026 | Toxic | Dubbed version |
| 2026 | Mana Shankara Vara Prasad Garu | |
| 2026 | Bad Boy Karthik | |
| 2026 | Veerabhadrudu | Dubbed version |
| 2026 | Vishwanath & Sons | Dubbed version |
| 2026 | Makutam | Dubbed version |

=== As an actor ===
| Year | Film | Role | Notes |
|---|---|---|---|
| 2008 | King | Himself | Cameo appearances |
| 2015 | James Bond | Himself | Cameo appearances |
| 2015 | Srimanthudu | Himself | Cameo appearance in the song "Rama Rama" |
| 2015 | Cheekati Rajyam | Subba Rao | |
| 2017 | Guru | Shopkeeper | |
| 2024 | Dhoom Dhaam | Chicago Subbarao | |
| 2025 | Veera Simha Reddy | Himself | Cameo appearance |

== Awards and nominations ==
- 2011: Filmfare Award for Best Lyricist – Telugu for "Sada Siva Sanyasi" from Khaleja (2010)
- 2012: SIIMA Award for Best Lyricist – Telugu for "Guruvaram March" from Dookudu (2011)
- 2013: CineMAA Award for Best Lyricist for Endukante Premanta (2012)
- Nandi Award for Best Lyricist for "Srimanthuda" from Srimanthudu in (2015)
- Nandi Award for Best Lyricist for "Pranaamam Pranaamam" from Janatha Garage (2016)
- 2017: Filmfare Award for Best Lyricist – Telugu for "Pranaamam" from Janatha Garage (2016)
- 2017: SIIMA Award for Best Lyricist – Telugu for ''Pranaamam'' from Janatha Garage (2016)
- 2022: SIIMA Award for Best Lyricist – Telugu for ''Butta Bomma'' from Ala Vaikunthapurramuloo (2020)
- 2023: Nominated – SIIMA Award for Best Lyricist – Telugu for "Laahe Laahe" from Acharya (2022)
- 2024: Nominated – Filmfare Award for Best Lyricist – Telugu for "Entha Chithram" from Ante Sundaraniki (2022)
- 2025: SIIMA Award for Best Lyricist – Telugu for "Chuttamalle" from Devara: Part 1 (2024)
