= Pilla Nachindi =

- Film poster
- Directed by: E. V. V. Satyanarayana
- Written by: Janardhana Maharshi
- Produced by: Usharani P.
- Starring: Srikanth; Rachana; Sanghavi
- Music by: Koti
- Release date: 10 September 1999
- Running time: 140 minutes
- Country: India
- Language: Telugu

Pilla Nachindi (transl. I liked the girl) is a 1999 Telugu-language comedy film directed by E.V.V Satyanarayana. The film stars Srikanth, Rachana and Sanghavi. Music for this film was composed by Koti.

== Plot ==
Dattu (Srikanth) is the son-in-law of a rich man Kutumba Rao (Kota Srinivasa Rao). His wife Preethi (Sanghavi) dies in a car accident. As per the wish of his dying daughter, Rao looks after Dattu and is even on the lookout for a wife for him. He interviews some girls to hire them as his personal assistant, which in fact is a cover-up for selecting a fiancée for Dattu.

Lingam (MS Narayana) suspects every move of his boss Rao, and tries to spoil his efforts at all stages and only when he informs Rao's wife (Rajitha) about this, the truth comes out into the open. These scenes, like a few others in the movie are meant for comic relief.

Lahari (Rachana Banerjee) runs a comedy club in which AVS, Bharani and others entertain the audience with skits and comedy plays. Rao is impressed by Lahari and decides she will be Dattu's fiancée. However, a complication arises: Since he is a widower, Dattu insists that he would only marry a woman who has lost her husband. Rachana agrees to pretend to be a widow and even shows a picture of one Gopalakrishna (Brahmanandam) published in the obituary column of a daily, as her deceased husband.

Gopalakrishna's wife loves Babu Mohan and it is she who gives the advertisement in the newspaper! And when the marriage between Srikanth and Rachana is fixed, the dead Gopalakrishna arrives on the scene along with his friend Ali to pep up the climax proceedings.

== Cast ==
- Srikanth as Dattu
- Rachana as Lahari
- Sanghavi as Preethi
- Kota Srinivasa Rao as Kutumba Rao
- Brahmanandam as Gotham Gopalakrishna
- Babu Mohan as Sharukh Mehdi
- Ali as Salman Mehdi
- M. S. Narayana as Lingam
- AVS
- Raja Ravindra
- Bandla Ganesh
- Rajitha as Susmita
- Mani Chandana as Kajol
- Madhumani as Nurse
- Tanikella Bharani

== Music ==
Music was composed by Koti.

Title	Singers
"Ayyaro Pilla Nachindhi"	S.P Balusubrahmanyam, K.S Chithra
"I Love You"	Mano, Swarnalatha
"Muddochusthundamma"	Mano, K.S Chithra
"Lavanya Raasi"	S.P Balusubrahmanyam, K.S Chithra
"Jalak Jalak"	Mano
"Balakumari saiga"	S.P Balusubrahmanyam, K.S Chithra

== Reception ==
Sify called the film "hilarious to the core", praising the performances of Kota Srinivasa Rao, MS Narayana, and Brahmanandam as well as the music, dialogue, and camera work, and hailed its release among a "spate of mundane love stories". However, Srikanth's character was described as leaving him with "nothing much to do" and the plot's theme was criticised. Griddaluru Gopalrao of Zamin Ryot also commended the film, particularly applauding the direction and comedy.
