= K. Vijaya Bhaskar =

Indian film director

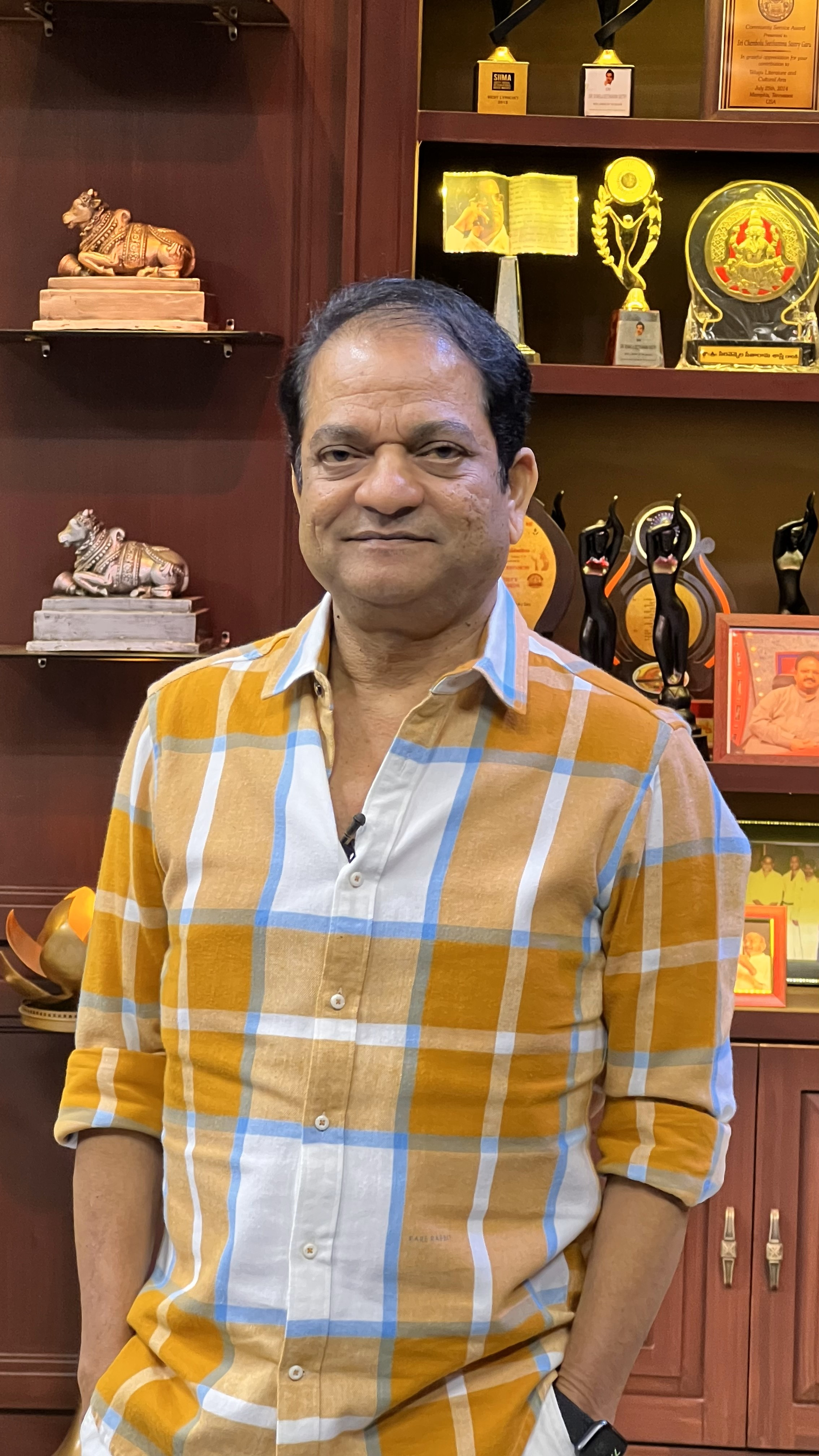
- Bhaskar in 2022
- Born: Avanigadda, Andhra Pradesh, India
- Occupation: Director
- Years active: 1991–present

K. Vijaya Bhaskar is Indian film director and screenwriter who works in Telugu cinema. He won the National Film Award for Best Feature Film in Telugu for Nuvve Kavali (2000). His other notable works include Nuvvu Naaku Nachav (2001), Manmadhudu (2002), and Malliswari (2004).

He is an alumnus of Sainik School, Korukonda.

== Filmography ==
Year	Title	Language	Notes
1991	Prarthana	Telugu	
1999	Swayamvaram	Telugu	
2000	Nuvve Kavali	Telugu	Remake of Niram
2001	Nuvvu Naaku Nachav	Telugu	
2002	Manmadhudu	Telugu	
2003	Tujhe Meri Kasam	Hindi	Remake of Niram
2004	Malliswari	Telugu	
2005	Jai Chiranjeeva	Telugu	
2007	Classmates	Telugu	Remake of Classmates
2008	Bhale Dongalu	Telugu	Remake of Bunty aur Babli
2011	Prema Kavali	Telugu	
2013	Masala	Telugu	Remake of Bol Bachchan
2023	Jilebi	Telugu	Remake of Adi Kapyare Kootamani
2024	Usha Parinayam	Telugu	

== Awards ==
- National Film Award for Best Feature Film in Telugu - Nuvve Kavali (2000)
- Filmfare Award for Best Director - Nuvve Kavali (2000)
