= G. V. Rama Raju =

Indian film director

- Born: Gottimukkala Venkata Rama Raju; Bhimavaram, West Godavari District, Andhra Pradesh
- Occupations: Film Director, Writer

Gottimukkala Venkata Rama Raju is an Indian film director and scriptwriter associated with Telugu cinema. He is from the town of Bhimavaram, West Godavari District, Andhra Pradesh. Ramaraju has undertaken many professions in his life and finally ended up in film industry. His first movie Mallela Theeram Lo Sirimalle Puvvu starring Kranthi, Sri Divya receiving critical acclaim from the directors Sekhar Kammula, V. V. Vinayak and Harish Shankar. His second movie Oka Manasu is a romantic drama starring Niharika Konidela and Naga Shourya which released June 2016. His third movie Priyuraalu is a romantic drama starring Prithvi Medavaram, Mounika Kalapala, Kaushik Reddy and Kamakshi Bhaskarla which released direct-to-streaming on SonyLIV. The film premiered on 17 September 2021 and received mixed reviews from the critics.

== Career ==
Ramaraju upon completing his graduation has prepared for civil services exams and has gone to the interview as well. Dr. S Rao advised him to explore other fields as Ramaraju can't handle bureaucracy. As film director Ram Gopal Varma is a distant relative of him, he joined RGV in direction department and worked for films like Deyyam. Based on RGV's advise, Ramaraju made his focus on creative script writing and took some break from working as an assistant director. Then he worked in Information technology field on Oracle Database for some period until he realized that cinema should be a self-discovery for him. He went back to cinema and joined the team of Eeshwar Nivas for Shool film. While working with Shool team, Ramaraju bonded well with the Anurag Kashyap and worked with him for films like Black Friday and Paanch. With the experience in the Bollywood arena, he landed back in Hyderabad to work on his own ideas. Inspired from Anurag Kashyap's vision, he started his first project in Telugu Mallela Theeram Lo Sirimalle Puvvu with an idea that his film should be a contender at film festival.

== Filmography ==
Year	Film
2013	Mallela Theeram Lo Sirimalle Puvvu
2016	Oka Manasu
2021	Priyuraalu
