= List of Telugu films of 1992 =

This is a list of films produced by the Tollywood (Telugu language film industry) based in Hyderabad, India in the year 1992.

== List of released films ==
Title	Director	Cast	Music director	Sources
Aa Okkati Adakku	E. V. V. Satyanarayana	Rajendra Prasad, Rambha, Rao Gopal Rao	Ilaiyaraaja	
Aapadbandhavudu	K. Vishwanath	Chiranjeevi, Meenakshi Sheshadri, Jandhyala	M. M. Keeravani	
Adharsham	Mouli	Jagapathi Babu, Yamuna, Ashwini Nachappa, Hema	M. M. Keeravani	
Adrushtam	Mouli	Naresh, Yamuna	Anand–Milind	
Agreement	Manivannan	Nagendra Babu, Anusha, Sarath Babu	M. M. Keeravani	
Ahankari	Dasari Narayana Rao	Rajasekhar, Shobhana, Aishwarya, Brahmanandam	Raj–Koti	
Akka Mogudu	Kranthi Kumar	Rajasekhar, Suhasini, Brahmanandam	Raj–Koti	
Alexander	K. Ranga Rao	Suman, Vani Viswanath, Kota Srinivasa Rao	Raj–Koti	
Allari Mogudu	K. Raghavendra Rao	Mohan Babu, Meena, Ramya Krishna	M. M. Keeravani	
Allari Pilla	Kodi Ramakrishna	Suresh, Meena, Satyanarayana	Vidyasagar	
Antham	Ram Gopal Varma	Nagarjuna Akkineni, Urmila Matondkar, Danny Denzongpa	R. D. Burman	
Appula Appa Rao	E. V. V. Satyanarayana	Rajendra Prasad, Shobhana, Brahmanandam, Babu Mohan	Rajan–Nagendra	
Asadhyulu	Joemon	Jagapathi Babu, Suresh, Shobana, Nirosha		
Aswamedham	K. Raghavendra Rao	Balakrishna Nandamuri, Shoban Babu, Meena, Nagma	Ilaiyaraaja	
Atta Sommu Alludu Danam	Y. Nageswara Rao	Vinod Kumar, Roja		
Ayyayyo Brahamayya	Akella	Naresh, Nandini, Brahmanandam	B. R. Suresh	
Babai Hotel	Jandhyala	Brahmanandam, Kinnera, Gundu Hanumantha Rao, Suthivelu	Suresh	
Balarama Krishnulu	Ravi Raja Pinisetty	Shoban Babu, Jagapathi Babu, Rajasekhar, Ramya Krishna, Rajeevi	Raj–Koti	
Bangaru Mama		Vinod Kumar, Meena, Yamuna	Raj–Koti	
Bhadram Koduko	Akkineni Kutumba Rao	Santhosh Reddy, Laya		
Bhale Khaideelu		Nirosha, Jeeva, Kaikala Satyanarayana		
Brundavanam	Singeetam Srinivasa Rao	Rajendra Prasad, Ramya Krishna, Anjali Devi, Kaikala Satyanarayana	Madhavapeddi Suresh	
Chakravyuham	Balu Mahendra	Suman, Archana, Gautami		
Champion	Y. Nageswara Rao	Vinod Kumar	Vidyasagar	
Chanti	Ravi Raja Pinisetty	Daggubati Venkatesh, Meena, Nassar, Sujatha	Ilaiyaraaja	
Chillara Mogudu Allari Koduku	Relangi Narasimha Rao	Chandra Mohan, Babu Mohan, Jayasudha	Vidyasagar	
Chinarayudu	B. Gopal	Daggubati Venkatesh, Vijayashanti, Kota Srinivasa Rao	Ilaiyaraaja	
Chittemma Mogudu	A. Kodandarami Reddy	Mohan Babu, Divya Bharti, Pooja Bedi		
Collectorgari Alludu	Sarath	Suman, Vani Viswanath	Raj–Koti	
College Bullodu	Sarath	Akkineni Nageswara Rao, Hareesh, Yamuna, Lakshmi	Raj–Koti	
Dabbu Bhale Jabbu	K. Rajendra	Raj Kumar, Sumalatha, Allu Ramalingaiah		
Dharma Kshetram	Kodandarami Reddy	Balakrishna Nandamuri, Divya Bharati	Ilaiyaraaja	
Doctor Ambedkar				
Donga Police	K. S. Prakash Rao	Mohan Babu, Mamta Kulkarni, Brahmanandam	Bappi Lahiri	
Doshi	VBLV Prasad	Ramki, S. P. Balasubrahmanyam, Lakshmi	Raj–Koti	
Gang War	Kodi Ramakrishna	Vinod Kumar, Ashok Kumar, Brahmanandam, Giribabu		
Gharana Mogudu	K. Raghavendra Rao	Chiranjeevi, Nagma, Rao Gopal Rao	M. M. Keeravani	
Golmaal Govindam	T. Rama Rao	Rajendra Prasad, Anusha, Subhalekha Sudhakar, Giribabu	Chakravarthy	
Gowramma	Rama Narayanan	Nizhalgal Ravi, Yamuna, Divya Vani		
Jaganaddam and Sons	Anil Kumar	Suresh, Sindhuja		
Jamba Lakidi Pamba	E. V. V. Satyanarayana	Naresh, Aamani, Brahmanandam		
Joker Mama Super Alludu	K. Vasu	Brahmanandam, Jeeva, Chandra Mohan, Poojitha		
Kala Rathrilo Kanne Pilla	Raj Kamal	Sharath, Abhilasha, Kota Srinivasa Rao	C. Sathyam	
Killer	Fazil	Nagarjuna, Nagma, Sharada	Ilaiyaraaja	
Lathi	Gunasekhar	Prashanth Thiagarajan		
Madhavayya Gari Manavadu	Muthyala Subbaiah	Harish Kumar, ANR, Meena, Nandini		
Mother India	T. V. Ramana Reddy	Jagapathi Babu, Sharada		
Mogudu Pellala Dongata	Relangi Narasimha Rao	Naresh, Divya Vani	Raj–Koti	
Moratodu Naa Mogudu	A. Kodandarami Reddy	Rajasekhar, Meena	Ilaiyaraaja	
Naga Kanya	Chola Rajan	Suresh, Nirosha		
Naga Bala	Rama Narayanan	Baby Shamili	Shankar–Ganesh	
Nani	Krishna Mohan Reddy	Charanraj, Baby Shamili, Seetha	Chakravarthy	
Parvatalu Panakalu	Muthyala Subbaiah	S. P. Balasubrahmanyam, Baby Shamili, Dasari Narayana Rao, Giribabu	Ramesh	
Pattudala	G. B. Shekar	Suman, Aishwarya	Ilaiyaraaja	
Peddarikam	A. M. Rathnam	Jagapati Babu, Sukanya, Bhanumathi Ramakrishna	Raj–Koti	
Pellam Chatu Mogudu	Relangi Narasimha Rao	Dasari Narayana Rao, Vani Viswanath	J. V. Raghavulu	
Pellam Chebithe Vinali	Kodi Ramakrishna	Harish Kumar, Meena, Meka Srikanth	Chakravarthy	
Pellante Noorella Panta	Muthyala Subbaiah	S. P. Balasubrahmanyam, Srinivasa Varma, Aishwarya, Brahmanandam		
Pellaniki Premalekha Priyuraliki Subhalekha	Relangi Narasimha Rao	Rajendra Prasad, Nandini, Babu Mohan, Brahmanandam	J. V. Raghavulu	
Pelli Neeku Sukham Naaku	P. N. Ramchandra Rao	Naresh, Divya Vani, Brahmanandam	Raj–Koti	
Police Brothers	Mohan Gandhi	Vinod Kumar, Roja, Charan Raj		
Pranadaata	Mohan Gandhi	Akkineni Nageswara Rao, Lakshmi, Allu Ramalingaiah, Girish Karnad	Raj–Koti	
Prema Drohi	Kondaveeti Satyam	Brahmanandam		
Prema Shikharam	Satya Gopla Ram	Prashanth, Mamta Kulkarni, Arun Pandiyan		
Prema Vijeta	K. Sadasiva Rao	Suresh, Harish Kumar, Roja, Yamuna	Ilaiyaraaja	
President Gari Pellam	A. Kodandarami Reddy	Nagarjuna, Meena, Meka Srikanth, Brahmanandam	M. M. Keeravani	
Priyathama	Geetha Krishna	Raghu, Nirosha	Ilaiyaraaja	
Public Rowdy	Sagar	Bhanuchander, Heera Rajagopal, Lakshmi, Brahmanandam	Raj–Koti	
Raguluthunna Bharatham	Allani Sridhar	ANR, Jagapathi Babu, Divyavani		
Rakta Tarpanam	Krishna Ghattamaneni	Krishna, Varsha Usgaonkar	Bappi Lahiri	
Rowdy Inspector	B. Gopal	Balakrishna Nandamuri, Vijayashanti, Brahmanandam	Bappi Lahiri	
Sahasam	Suresh Krissna	Jagapathi Babu, Bhanu Chander		
Samrat Ashoka	NTR	NTR, Vani Viswanath		
Seetapathi Chalo Tirupathi	Vijaya Bapineedu	Rajendra Prasad, Vani Viswanath, Aishwarya		
Seetharatnam Gari Abbayi	E. V. V. Satyanarayana	Vanisri, Vinod Kumar, Roja		
Subba Rayudi Pelli	Dasari Narayana Rao	Rajendra Prasad, Aishwarya		
Sundarakanda	K. Raghavendra Rao	Daggubati Venkatesh, Meena, Aparna	M. M. Keeravani	
Swati Kiranam	K. Vishwanath	Mammootty, Radhika, Master Manjunath	K. V. Mahadevan	
Teja	N. Hari Babu	Master Tarun, Ranga Rao, Srinivasa Varma		
Valu Jada Tolu Beltu	Vijaya Bapineedu	Rajendra Prasad, Kanaka		
Yagnam	Gutha Ramineedu	P. L. Narayana, Bhanu Chander		
