= Akkineni =

Akkineni is a Telugu surname that may refer to:

- Akkineni Lakshmi Vara Prasada Rao, popularly known as L. V. Prasad, Indian film actor, producer and director
- Akkineni Ramesh Prasad son of Akkineni Lakshmi Vara Prasada Rao
- Akkineni Sreekar Prasad, film editor, grandson of L. V. Prasad
- Akkineni Kutumba Rao filmmaker
- Akkineni Nageswara Rao, Telugu film actor and producer
- Akkineni Nagarjuna, Telugu film actor and producer; son of Akkineni Nageswara Rao
- Amala Akkineni, actress; wife of Akkineni Nagarjuna
- Akkineni Naga Chaitanya, a Telugu film actor; son of Akkineni Nagarjuna
- Samantha Akkineni, actress; former wife of Akkineni Naga Chaitanya
- Akkineni Akhil, son of Akkineni Nagarjuna and Akkineni Amala

== See also ==
- Daggubati-Akkineni family
