= Vaali Mohan Das =

Indian Tamil-film director, writer and lyricist

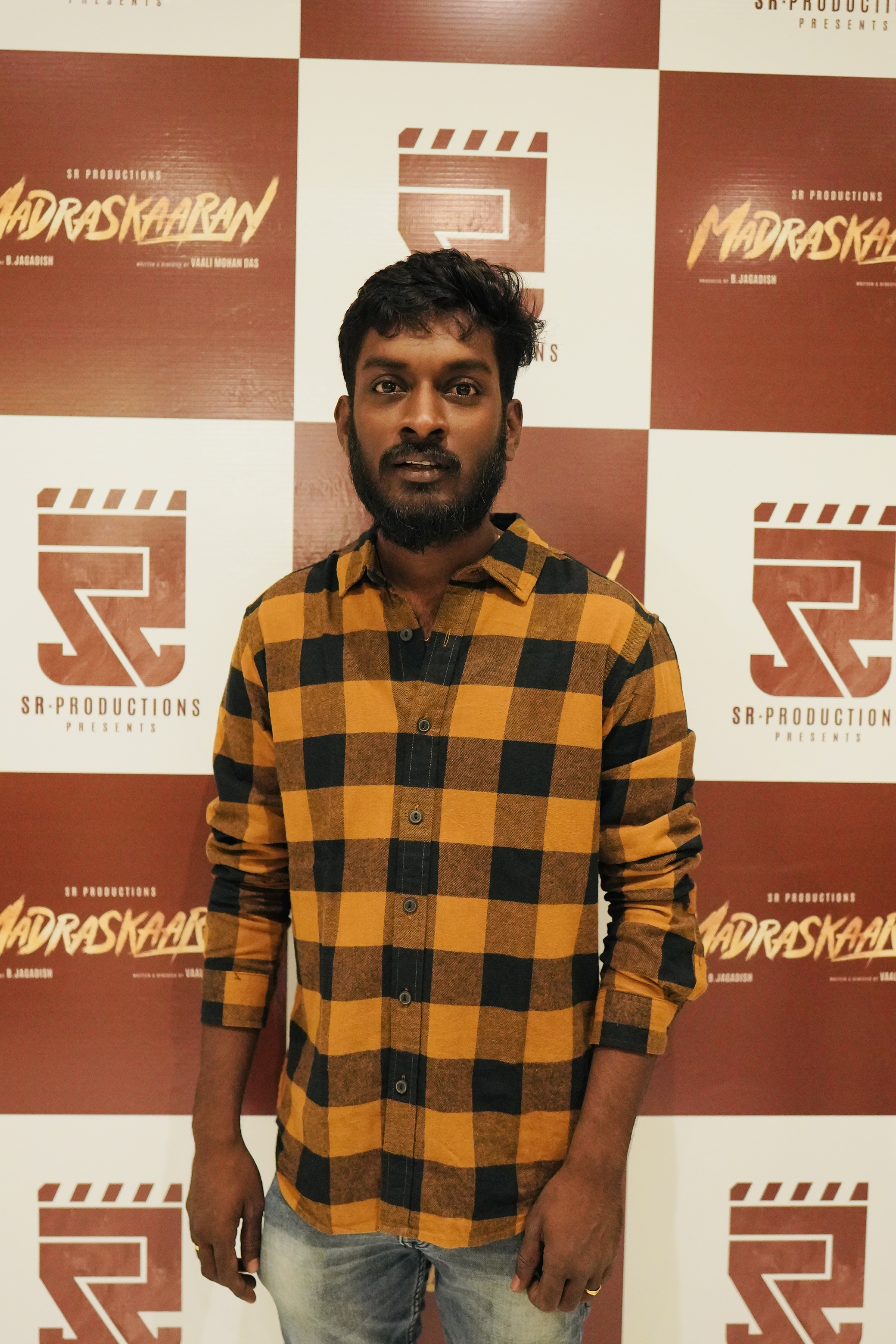
- Vaali Mohan Das at the Madraskaaran launch event.
- Born: Vaali Mohan Das Murugan; 9 August 1993 (age 33); Pudukottai)
- Education: Dhanraj Baid Jain College , Tamil Nadu Music and Fine Arts University
- Occupations: Film director, Screenwriter, Lyricist
- Years active: 2023–present
- Notable work: Rangoli
- Spouse: Vijayamalini

Vaali Mohan Das is an Indian film director, screenwriter and lyricist who works in Tamil cinema. He made his directorial debut with Rangoli (2023).

== Career ==
Vaali Mohan Das started his career as an assistant director under Vasanth. He made his directorial debut with the Tamil film Rangoli in 2023, The same year, he also directed the first episode of the web series Sshhh, which premiered on Aha. His next film, Madraskaaran, starring Shane Nigam, Niharika and Kalaiyarasan is set to release on 10 January 2025.

== Filmography ==
Key
†	Denotes films that have not yet been released

Year	Title	Notes	Ref.
2023	Rangoli	Debut Film	
2024	Sshhh	An Aha web series. Segment : Kaamathuppal	
2025	Madraskaaran		

=== Lyricist ===
Year	Film	Song(s)
2023	Rangoli	"Kaaliyamma's Love", "Bulb Song", "Pogatha Dhooram", "Bulb Song Remix"
2025	Madraskaaran	"Kaatrin Mozhi"
