= Nitya Shetty =

Indian actress

- Born: Nitya Shetty; Hyderabad, Andhra Pradesh, India (now in Telangana, India)
- Occupations: Actress, Entrepreneur
- Years active: 1999-present

Nitya Shetty is an Indian actress who works primarily in Telugu cinema. She won two Nandi Awards.

== Career ==
Nitya Shetty worked as a child actress in Telugu films during the early 2000s appearing in films including Devullu (2000), while winning the Nandi Award for Best Child Actress for her roles in Chinni Chinni Aasha (1998) and Little Hearts (2000). After about 20 films as a child artiste, she took a break from films to complete her education. She graduated in Electronics and Communication Engineering from Institute of Aeronautical Engineering, Dundigal later campus placed and joined Infosys as a software engineer.

However she wanted to continue work as an actress and successfully auditioned to be a part of the Telugu film, Padesave, before working on the family drama, Dagudumootha Dandakor (2015).

She has consequently featured in low budget Tamil films including Jayaprakash's Aivarattam (2015) and Kadhal Kaalam (2016). She recently worked in the Telugu film Nuvvu Thopu Raa (2019) and Tamil film "Aghavan"(2019).

== Filmography ==
Year	Title	Role	Language	Notes
1999	Chinni Chinni Aasa		Telugu	Nandi Award for Best Child Actress
2000	Manasichanu		Telugu	
2000	Devullu	Bhavani	Telugu	
2000	Little Hearts		Telugu	Nandi Award for Best Child Actress
2001	Maya	Maya	Hindi	
2002	Mounamelanoyi	Mounika's sister	Telugu	
2003	Harivillu	Gowri	Telugu	
2004	Anji	Nithya	Telugu	
2015	Aivarattam	Rathna	Tamil	
2015	Dagudumootha Dandakor	Madhu	Telugu	
2016	Padesave	Niharika	Telugu	
2017	Kaadhal Kaalam		Tamil	
2019	Aghavan		Tamil	
2019	Nuvvu Thopu Raa	Ramya	Telugu	
2020	O Pitta Katha	Venkatalakshmi	Telugu	
2021	Thalaivii	Trainee doctor	Tamil; Hindi	
2022	Wanted Pandugod	Rathi	Telugu	
2025	Viral Prapancham	Aditi	Telugu	

=== Television ===
Year	Title	Role	Network	Notes	Ref
2022	Hello World	Pravalika Jaladhanki	ZEE5	Web Debut	
2023	3C's	Chandrika "Chandu"	SonyLIV		
