= Baladitya (actor) =

Telugu actor

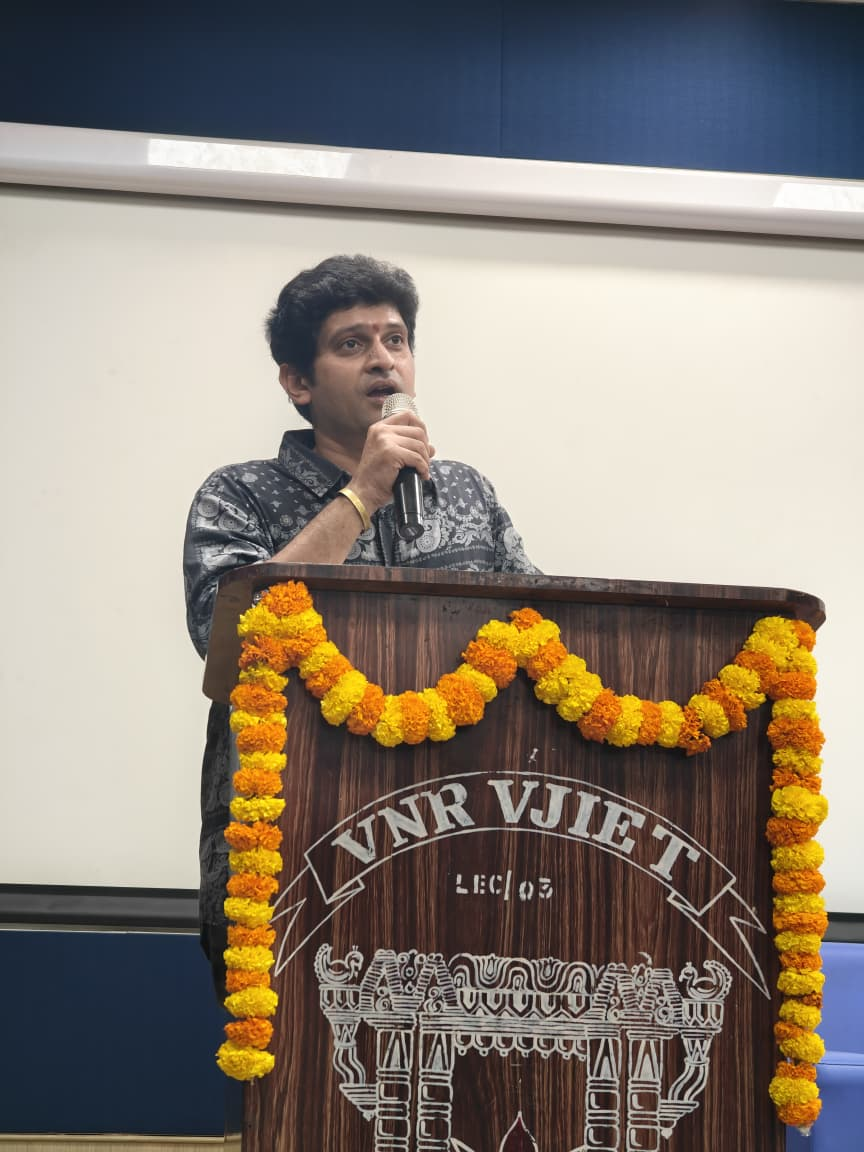
- Born: Eluru, Andhra Pradesh, India
- Other name: Aditya
- Years active: 1991–present
- Awards: Nandi Awards

Baladitya is an Indian actor, lyricist, dialogue writer, dubbing artist, and TV host who works in Telugu cinema and television. He started out as a child artiste (as Master Aditya) and is known for his roles in Edurinti Mogudu Pakkinti Pellam (1991) and Little Soldiers (1996). He is a recipient of two Nandi Awards.

== Early life ==
Baladitya was born in Eluru, Andhra Pradesh to Y. S. Shankar and Kalyani.

== Career ==
He made his debut as a child actor in Rajendra Prasad's Telugu comedy film Edurinti Mogudu Pakkinti Pellam. He acted in forty films as a child actor (in Telugu, Hindi, Tamil, Kannada and Malayalam) and ten films as a leading actor (in Telugu). He made his debut in a lead role in the movie Chantigadu (2003) directed by B. A. Jaya. He got three Nandi Awards, two as a child actor for Anna and Little Soldiers and one as an anchor for the kids' quiz show Champion. He played the male lead role in 1940 Lo Oka Gramam.

Baladitya hosted a quiz show called Champion in 2015 and 2016 which aired on ETV. He worked as the lead in a daily soap called Shambhavi, which was telecast on Star Maa. He plays the lead character in the Tamil serial, Rasaathi, which is popular on Sun TV. He was the dialouge writer for the film Khudiram Bose (film)

== Filmography ==
=== Film ===
==== As a child actor ====
Year	Film	Role	Language	Notes
1991	Edurinti Mogudu Pakkinti Pellam	Sridhar alias Stamp Gadu	Telugu	
1991	Edurmaneli Ganda Pakkadmaneli Hendthi	Anand alias Aa / Stampu	Kannada	
1991	Rowdy Gaari Pellam		Telugu	
1991	Attintlo Adde Mogudu	Gopi's nephew	Telugu	
1992	Jamba Lakidi Pamba	School Headmaster	Telugu	
1993	Bangaru Bullodu		Telugu	
1993	Abbaigaru		Telugu	
1993	Evandi Aavida Vachindi		Telugu	
1994	Hello Brother	Young Deva	Telugu	
1994	Anna		Telugu	
1994	Theerpu		Telugu	
1994	Super Police	Sunny	Telugu	
1995	Diya Aur Toofan		Hindi	
1995	Sankalpam		Telugu	
1995	Maatho Pettukoku	Young Arjun	Telugu	
1996	Little Soldiers	Sunny	Telugu	
1996	Sri Krishnarjuna Vijayam	Young Krishna	Telugu	
1997	Hitler	Young Madhav Rao	Telugu	
1997	Masmaram		Malayalam	
1997	Lav Kush	Lava	Hindi	
1997	Rettai Jadai Vayasu		Tamil	
1998	Naam Iruvar Namakku Iruvar		Tamil	
1999	Samarasimha Reddy		Telugu	

==== As an actor ====
Year	Film	Role	Notes	Ref.
2003	Chantigadu	Chantigadu		
2005	Keelu Gurram	Chantigadu		
2005	Vamsam	Chinna		
2006	Sundaraaniki Tondarekkuva	Sundaram		
2006	Roommates	Shekhar		
2007	Sandhya			
2008	Veta			
2008	Bhadradri	Ravi		
2009	Jajimalli			
2010	1940 Lo Oka Gramam	Suri		
2020	Entha Manchivaadavuraa	Aditya		
2021	Annapurnamma Gari Manavadu			
2021	Maa Oori Polimera	Jangaiah		
2023	Maa Oori Polimera 2	Jangaiah	Cameo appearance	
2026	Mrithyunjay	Achyuth Sarma		

=== Television ===
Year	Title	Role	Network	Language	Notes	ref
2018	Champion	Host	ETV	Telugu		
2018–2019	Shambhavi	Shivayya	Star Maa	Telugu		
2019–2020	Rasaathi	Rajadurai/Pandian	Sun TV	Tamil		
2019–2020	Subhadra Parinayam	Krishna	Gemini TV	Telugu		
2020	Gods of Dharmapuri (G.O.D)	Satyanand	ZEE5	Telugu		
2021	Savitramma Gari Abbayi	Balraju (After Plastic Surgery)/ Gaaliraju (Pickpocketer) (Dual Role)	Star Maa	Telugu		
2021	Unheard	Dr. Chalapathi	Disney+ Hotstar	Telugu		
2022	Bigg Boss 6	Contestant	Star Maa	Telugu		
2023	Kayal	Suryakumar	Sun TV	Tamil		
2025-26	Katha Sudha	Jay, Veera Babu, & Kiran	ETV Win	Telugu	Segments: "Uttaram", "Vendipattilu", & ''Oka Chinna Prasna''.	

== Awards ==
Nandi Awards

- Best Child Actor - Anna (1994)
- Best Child Actor - Little Soldiers (1996)
