= Hello World (TV series) =

Telugu comedy television series

- Genre: Comedy Romance
- Written by: Siva Sai Vardhan
- Directed by: Siva Sai Vardhan
- Starring: Aryan Rajesh; Sadha; Ram Nitin
- Music by: PK Dhandi
- Country of origin: India
- Original language: Telugu
- No. of seasons: 1
- No. of episodes: 8

Production
- Producer: Niharika Konidela
- Production location: India
- Cinematography: Edurolu Raju
- Editor: Prawin Pudi
- Running time: 24-40 minutes

Original release
- Network: ZEE5
- Release: 22 July 2022

Hello World is a Telugu language comedy television series streaming on ZEE5. It was directed by Siva Sai Vardhan and featured Aryan Rajesh, Sadha, Ram Nitin, Nayan Karishma, Sudharsan Govind, and Nitya Shetty in the primary roles. It was produced by Niharika Konidela and had music composed by PK Dhandi.

== Overview ==
Hello World is an eight-episode slice of life workplace drama about 8 youngsters who join a large IT company, hoping that their struggles are all behind them, only to find that life has a lot more in store than they had imagined.

== Plot ==
The show opens with a bunch of college graduates - Siddharth, Varun, Amrutha, Meghana, Suresh, Rahul & Varsha - receiving job offers from a big IT company - PeopleTech. All of them arrive at the campus with dreamy eyes assuming that their future is going to be smooth and sorted. However, their excitement is short-lived when Prarthana, a senior IT employee working at the company, informs them that their jobs will be made permanent only after they all clear some mandatory training and evaluations. During the training period, they develop a beautiful bond among themselves and become friends. The situations these characters face prompt them to face many conflicts both personally and professionally and learn real-life lessons. The season ends on an emotional note by establishing the near-death situation of Raghav, their most admired trainer, and how they complete his unfinished project as a tribute to him.

== Cast ==
- Aryan Rajesh as Raghav
- Sadha as Prardhana
- Ram Nitin as Siddarth
- Nayan Karishma as Meghana
- Sudharsan Govind as Varun
- Nitya Shetty as Pravallika
- Nikil V Simha as Rahul
- Apoorva Rao as Varsha
- Geela Anil as Suresh
- Snehal S Kamat as Amrutha
- Ravi Varma as Debashish
- Jayaprakash as Anand

== Reception ==
=== Critical response ===
Hello World' received mostly mixed reviews. The Times Of India rated it 3 out of 5. ABP News rated it 2.75 out of 5 and commented, “'Hello World' is a simple and honest web series”. OTTplay praised the performances of the cast and said, “Sivasai Vardhan, the director, lends authenticity to the portrayal of the corporate setup with his attention to detail”. Binged had a critical view of the show and called it a “bland drama”, while rating it 5.5 out of 10.

Hello World went on to become one of the most watched web series made in Telugu language, clocking over 100 million minutes of watch time within two weeks of launch.
