= Kanulu Therichinaa Kanulu Moosinaa =

2023 Indian Telugu-language film by Sandeep Reddi Katkuri

- Release poster
- Directed by: Sandeep Reddi Katkuri
- Written by: Mahesh Sk; Balaji Prasad; Shreekanth Raj Bitling
- Produced by: S N Swamy
- Starring: Sai Ronak; Devika Satheesh
- Cinematography: Shashank Mali
- Edited by: Damu Narravula
- Music by: Gowra Hari
- Production company: Flying Eagle Entertainments
- Distributed by: ETV Win
- Release date: 16 June 2023
- Running time: 120 minutes
- Country: India
- Language: Telugu

Kanulu Therichinaa Kanulu Moosinaa is a 2023 Indian Telugu-language drama film directed by Sandeep Reddi Katkuri. The film features Sai Ronak and Devika Satheesh in important roles.

The film was released on 16 June 2023 on ETV Win. The film's title is based on a song from Anandam (2001).

== Cast ==
- Sai Ronak as Puneeth
- Devika Satheesh as Aditi
- Abhilash Bandari as Santosh
- Perika Usha Sree as Divya
- Anish Kuruvilla as RK
- Suchitra Anandan as Rekha
- Sanjay Reddy as JK
- Arjun Anand as Harsha

== Soundtrack ==
All music is composed by Gowra Hari.

No.	Title	Lyrics	Singer(s)	Length
1.	"Marhabha"	Bhaskarabhatla	Yazin Nizar	3:54
2.	"Naalo Nene Naatho"	Kittu Vissapragada	Gowra Hari	4:57

== Release and reception ==
Kanulu Therichinaa Kanulu Moosinaa was released on 16 June 2023 on ETV Win.

Srivathsan Nadadhur of OTTPlay gave a rating of 2.5 out of 5 and wrote that "Kanulu Therichinaa Kanulu Moosinaa has its fair share of good ideas and loose ends".
