= Rangoli (2023 film) =

2023 Tamil film

- Directed by: Vaali Mohan Das
- Written by: Vaali Mohan Das
- Produced by: K. Babu Reddy; G. Satish Kumar
- Starring: Hamaresh; Aadukalam Murugadoss; Prarthana
- Cinematography: I. Maruthanayagam
- Edited by: R. Sathyanarayanan
- Music by: Sundaramurthy KS
- Production company: Gopuram Studios
- Release date: 1 September 2023
- Country: India
- Language: Tamil

Rangoli is a 2023 Indian Tamil-language coming-of-age family drama film written and directed by Vaali Mohan Das. The film stars Hamaresh, Aadukalam Murugadoss and Prarthana in the lead roles. The film was produced by K Babu Reddy and G Satish Kumar under the banner of Gopuram Studios.

Rangoli is scheduled to release in theatres on 1 September 2023 and received positive reviews from critics.

== Plot ==
Sathyamoorthy "Sathya" is an intelligent student who tops his class. He is the pride of his government school. Though he is sharp, his father Gandhi, a dhobi by profession, and his wife Kaliamma are both under the impression that they should put him in a private school to make sure he makes it big in his life. However, getting Sathya admitted to a popular private school was beyond their means of Gandhi. Nevertheless, Gandhi was willing to take loans and work overtime to get his son into a private school. The whole family — which includes Gandhi, his wife Kaliamma, and their daughter Vembu Lakshmi — work to make ends meet. Meanwhile, Sathya finds it tough to adapt to the new school where most students are from well-to-do families. At the same time, he is burdened by the fact that his entire family slogs to make him study in a costly private school. What happens then is what the film is all about.

== Cast ==
- Hamaresh as Sathya
- Aadukalam Murugadoss as Gandhi
- Prarthana Sandeep as Parvathy
- Amit Bhargav as Ravanan
- Sanjay
- Rahul as Gowtham
- Vishwa
- Akshaya Hariharan as Vembu Lakshmi
- Krithiga as Pooja
- Saishri Prabhakaran as Kaliamma

== Production ==
The project was announced in February 2022 as a Tamil and Telugu bilingual film, which would be a family drama set against the backdrop of school life. Produced by K. Babu Reddy and G. Satish Kumar’s newly launched Gopuram Studios, the film marked the directorial debut of Vaali Mohan Das, an erstwhile assistant to director Vasanth. Satish Kumar's son Hamaresh, a nephew of filmmaker A. L. Vijay, was signed on to play his first lead role after earlier appearances as a child artist in Deiva Thirumagal (2011) and Maanagaram (2017).

Production on the film was completed by November 2022, with the film eventually having a theatrical release by September 2023.

== Music ==
The music of the film is composed by Sundaramurthy KS.

Tamil
No.	Title	Lyrics	Singer(s)	Length
1.	"Yengengum Vaanam"	Velmurugan	GV Prakash Kumar	4:06
2.	"Sathya Life"	Velmurugan	Venkatramanan	5:03
3.	"Kaaliyamma's Love"	Vaali Mohan Das	Vrusha Balu	4:15
4.	"Bulb Song"	Vaali Mohan Das	Guru Ayyadurai; M.S.Nehru	3:08
5.	"Yeno Un"	Elan	Anusha Rajasekhar	4:13
6.	"Mayakam Yean"	Karthik Netha	Teejay; Srinivasan	2:27
7.	"Pogatha Dhooram"	Vaali Mohan Das	Venkatramanan	2:19
8.	"Bulb Song Remix"	Vaali Mohan Das	Guru Ayyadurai	2:50
9.	"Yeno Un Reprise"	Elan	Padmapriya Raghavan	4:13
10.	"Sathya Life"	Velmurugan	Kapil Kapilan	3:00
Total length:				35.34

== Reception ==
A Maalai Malar critic gave 2.5 out of 5 and stated that "He has worked to the required extent among the characters." Nakkheeran critic stated that "there is no lag anywhere from the beginning to the end of the film which is a plus for the film." Dinamalar critic rated 2.5 out of 5 and wrote that "A film means that there has to be a twist or a knot in the script. Absence of such in the film makes." Virakesari gave a mixed review.
