= Lanka (2017 film) =

2017 Indian Telugu-language film

- Directed by: Sri Muni
- Written by: Sri Muni
- Produced by: Dinesh Namana; Vishnu Kumar Namana
- Starring: Raasi; Sai Ronak; Ena Saha
- Cinematography: V. Ravi Kumar
- Edited by: Karthika Srinivas
- Music by: Sricharan Pakala
- Production company: Rolling Rocks Entertainment
- Release date: 21 April 2017
- Country: India
- Language: Telugu

Lanka is a 2017 Indian Telugu-language thriller film directed by Sri Muni. The film stars his wife, Raasi, in the lead role with Sai Ronak and the Bengali actress Ena Saha in supporting roles.

== Cast ==
- Raasi as Rebecca
- Sai Ronak as Director Sai
- Ena Saha as Swathi
- Supreeth as Officer Srinivas
- Giri Babu as DIG Madhusudhan
- Shiju as Sharat Chandra
- Satya as Satya, Sai’s friend
- Satyam Rajesh as Constable Marthand
- Sudharshan as Sudha, Sai’s friend
- Venu Yeldandi as Moscow, Sharat’s assistant
- Mounica as Officer

== Release ==
The film was released to negative reviews.

The Deccan Chronicle wrote that the film lacks execution and narration and criticized the film's music. The Hindu wrote that "'Lanka' has an intriguing premise but is marred by long-winded narration".
