= Anna (1994 film) =

- అన్న
- Directed by: Muthyala Subbaiah
- Produced by: Pokuri Babu Rao
- Starring: Rajasekhar; Gautami; Roja; Master Baladitya
- Music by: M. M. Keeravani
- Release date: 7 April 1994
- Running time: 136 min
- Country: India
- Language: Telugu

Anna (transl. Elder Brother) is 1994 Indian Telugu-language action film directed by Muthyala Subbaiah and produced by Pokuri Babu Rao. The film stars Rajasekhar, Gautami, Roja and Master Baladitya. The music was composed by M. M. Keeravani. The film premiered at the 1995 IIFA Film Festival. The film won four Nandi Awards & one Filmfare Award. The film was remade in Hindi as Bhai in 1997 and in Kannada as Nammanna in 2005.

== Plot ==
The film is about a man who tries to tackle the evils of society and bring peace.

== Cast ==
- Rajasekhar as Komaranna
- Gautami as Sarada
- Roja as Chandi
- Master Baladitya as Chinna
- Brahmanandam
- Sirisha Jasti
- M. Balaiah
- Pradeep Shakthi as Police Inspector
- Narra Venkateswara Rao
- Gollapudi Maruthi Rao
- Suthivelu
- Devaraj

== Soundtrack ==
Anna

Film score by M. M. Keeravani
- Released: 1994
- Genre: Soundtrack
- Length: 28:49
- Label: Anand Audio
- Producer: M. M. Keeravani

M. M. Keeravani chronology
Allari Premikudu (1994)	Anna (1994)	Swathi (1994)

The music was composed by M. M. Keeravani and released by the Akash Audio Company. It is now owned by Aananda Audio Video.

No.	Title	Lyrics	Singer(s)	Length
1.	"Guru Guru Pitta"	Jaladi Raja Rao	S. P. Balasubrahmanyam, K. S. Chithra	5:04
2.	"Kalaganna Kalyanama"	Sirivennela Seetharama Sastry	K. S. Chithra	4:43
3.	"Ammamma Debba"	Adrushta Deepak	S. P. Balasubrahmanyam, K. S. Chithra	4:01
4.	"Arere Endiranna"	Jaladi Raja Rao	S. P. Balasubrahmanyam, K. S. Chithra	5:14
5.	"Sambhavami Yuge Yuge"	Jaladi Raja Rao	S. P. Balasubrahmanyam	4:25
6.	"Ayyo Rama"	Sirivennela Seetharama Sastry	S. P. Balasubrahmanyam, K. S. Chithra	5:04
Total length:				27:47

== Awards ==
Filmfare Awards South

- Filmfare Award for Best Actor – Telugu - Rajasekhar

Nandi Awards -1994

- Best Supporting Actor - Brahmanandam
- Best Child Actor - Y. S. Adithya
- Best Dialogue writer - M. V. S. Haranatha Rao
- Best Supporting Actress - Roja
