= Viral Prapancham =

2025 Indian Telugu-language film by Brijesh Tangi

- Theatrical release poster
- Directed by: Brijesh Tangi
- Written by: Brijesh Tangi; Vijaya; Lalith Bankupally
- Produced by: Akhil Tangi; GS; Anil Moduga
- Starring: Priyanka Sharma; Nitya Shetty; Sai Ronak; Sunny Naveen
- Cinematography: Varun Ankarla
- Edited by: GS
- Music by: Gyaani
- Production companies: Revolutionary Talkies; Anil Moduga Films
- Release date: 7 March 2025
- Running time: 97 minutes
- Country: India
- Language: Telugu

Viral Prapancham (transl. Viral universe) is a 2025 Indian Telugu-language screenlife thriller film co-written and directed by Brijesh Tangi. The film features Priyanka Sharma, Nitya Shetty, Sai Ronak and Sunny Naveen in lead roles.

The film was released on 7 March 2025.

== Plot ==
Aditi and Swapna are two young girls, who develop online relationship with their boyfriends. The film portrays the consequences of Online and distant relationships.

== Cast ==
- Priyanka Sharma as Swapna
- Nitya Shetty as Aditi
- Sai Ronak as Ravi
- Sunny Naveen as Praveen

== Music ==
All lyrics are written by Rambabu Gosala; all music is composed by Gyaani.

No.	Title	Singer(s)	Length
1.	"Enni Rangulo"	Lakshmi Meghana	3:12
2.	"Gaayame"	Sindhuja Srinivasan	4:24
3.	"Oopiraadakundhile"	Gyaani	2:46

== Release and reception ==
Viral Prapancham was released on 7 March 2025.

Andhra Jyothi gave a positive review with particular praise towards story and narration. News18 Telugu rated the film 2.75 out of 5 and echoed the same. NTV gave a rating of 2.5 out of 5.
