= Subhadra Parinayam (TV series) =

- Genre: Drama; Family
- Written by: Srinath Chandrasekhar; Dialogues; Sri Ranga N V K
- Screenplay by: Ravi kolikapudi
- Directed by: Govind Eemani (1-37); K V Reddy (38-99)
- Creative director: Katla Nagayya
- Starring: Chaitra Reddy; Baladitya; Srirag; Shaurya Shashank
- Theme music composer: P.R
- Opening theme: "Gala Galamani" vocals Dhanunjay; Anjana sowmya
- Country of origin: India
- Original language: Telugu
- No. of seasons: 1
- No. of episodes: 99

Production
- Executive producer: D Maheswara Reddy
- Producers: V Vijaykumar Varma; D Madhusudhan Reddy
- Cinematography: Meera; Krishna Kishore
- Editor: Ram
- Camera setup: Multi-camera
- Running time: 20-22 minutes
- Production company: VMC1 Industries Pvt Ltd

Original release
- Network: Gemini TV
- Release: 14 October 2019 – 28 February 2020

Related
- Nandini

Subhadra Parinayam was an Indian Telugu language soap opera directed by K V Reddy that aired on Gemini TV from 14 October 2019 to 28 February 2020. The show starred Chaitra Reddy, Baladitya, Srirag and Shaurya Shashank.

== Cast ==
- Chaitra Reddy as Subhadra
- Baladitya as Krishna, Subhadra's brother
- Shaurya Shashank as Dattu
- Srirag as Pardhu, Subhadra's husband
- Suresh as Dattu and Rukmini's father
- Sripriya as Sumithra, Pardhu's mother
