= Raajahyogam =

2022 action comedy film

- Directed by: Ram Ganapathi
- Written by: Ram Ganapathi
- Dialogues by: Chintapalli Ramana
- Produced by: Mani Laxman Rao
- Starring: Sai Ronak; Ankita Saha; Ajay Ghosh; Bismi Naas
- Cinematography: Vijay C. Kumar
- Edited by: Karthika Srinivas
- Music by: Arun Muraleedharan
- Production companies: Sri Navabala Creations; Vaishnavi Nataraj Productions
- Distributed by: Sri Enterprise
- Release date: 30 December 2022
- Running time: 145 minutes
- Country: India
- Language: Telugu

Raajahyogam is a 2022 Indian Telugu-language action comedy film directed by Ram Ganapathi and produced under the banner of Sri Navabala Creations and Vaishnavi Nataraj Productions. The film stars Sai Ronak alongside Ankita Saha, Bismi Naas and Ajay Ghosh in pivotal roles. Film released on 30 December 2022.

Movie gets mixed to negative reviews from critics. Praise Sai Ronak presence, comedy, score but criticized on Screenplay, editing and runtime.

== Plot ==
Rishi (Sai Ronak) from a middle-class family works as a mechanic but somehow falls in love with a rich girl and wants to settle down in life. In this sequence, he sees Sri (Ankita Saha) and falls in love at first sight. But she is in a relationship with a business magnate (Jeeva) who wants to live a life of luxury. After lying to her that he's rich, Rishi comes on to Sri. After an impulse, they passionately kiss. Unable to control her instincts, Sri initiates sex and Rishi accepts. Later, Rishi takes Sri to his room, they keep having sex all the night. What happened to Rishi after that? In the end, who did Rishi marry Aishwarya, or Sri? That is the story of the rest of the movie.

== Cast ==
- Sai Ronak as Rishi
- Ankita Saha as Shree
- Bismi Naas as Aishwarya
- Ajay Ghosh as Radha, Gangster
- Sijju Daniel as Daniel, Diamond smuggler
- Chitram Srinu as Radha's Assistant
- Bhadram as Hotel Floor Manager
- Thagubothu Ramesh as Trump
- Shakalaka Shankar as Jump
- Praveen as Karan
- Giridhar as Johar
- Madhunandan as Resort Manager
- Jeeva as Sugar Daddy
- Ravi Prakash as Car owner
- Jabardasth Chalaki Chanti as Mechanic, Rishi's friend
- Jabardasth Appa Rao as Garage Owner

== Release ==
The movie was theatrically released on 30 December 2022 in Telegu only.

From 9 February 2023, the film was available on Disney+Hotstar in Telugu, Tamil, Kannada, Hindi and Malayalam with same title.
