= Edurmaneli Ganda Pakkadmaneli Hendthi =

- Directed by: Relangi Narasimha Rao
- Written by: Relangi Narasimha Rao
- Screenplay by: Relangi Narasimha Rao
- Based on: Edurinti Mogudu Pakkinti Pellam (1991)
- Produced by: P. Balaram
- Starring: Shashikumar; Shruti; Umashree; Mukhyamantri Chandru; Master Adithya
- Cinematography: Sharath
- Edited by: Murali; Ramayya
- Music by: Raj–Koti
- Production company: Sri Anupama Productions
- Release date: 20 April 1992
- Running time: 136 minutes
- Country: India
- Language: Kannada

Edurmaneli Ganda Pakkadmaneli Hendthi (transl. Opposite House Husband-Side House Wife) is a 1992 Indian Kannada-language comedy drama film directed by Relangi Narasimha Rao and produced by P. Balaram. A remake of Rao's Telugu film, Edurinti Mogudu Pakkinti Pellam (1991), the film featured Shashikumar, Shruti and Master Adithya, who reprises his role from the original. The film's music was composed by Raj–Koti and cinematography is by Sharath.

== Plot ==
Bagalkote Vasudevarao (BaVa) is a big miser and marries Jaya, who likes to lead a normal and enjoyable life. Due to her husband's constant miserly attitude in everyday life and a publicly embarrassing event, she leaves the house being pregnant. After a few years she rents a house which unknowingly for her is right next to that of her estranged husband's house. she is living with her now school going kid, who seems to have inherited all the stingy qualities of his father. The child gets closer to his father with everyday interactions which makes his mother Jaya much worried and leads to her shifting to a new house. Meanwhile, Bava's mother, who was angry with him because of his marriage against her will, gets to know he has left his wife. She joins as a maid in Jaya's house to spend time with Jaya and her grandson. Eventually, Jaya discovers the maid is none other than her mother-in-law and feels bad for treating her as a maid. Bava and Jaya's Nepali Boss Rekha (who is known for her hilarious Malapropisms, much to the discomfort of her colleagues), a kind-hearted lady, concocts a plan to rid of Bava's stinginess leading to a situation where Bava is admitted to the hospital and he is made to believe that he has an incurable brain tumor and very little time to live. As per these plan of events Bava's view towards money and family is changed and unites him with his family. In the end, Rekha reveals the plot and the movie ends on a happy note.

== Cast ==
- Shashikumar as Bava alias Bagalkote Vasudeva rao
- Shruti as Jayakumari
- Mukhyamantri Chandru As Turuvekere Nethrappa
- Umashree as Kanakaveni, a novelist
- Mysore Lokesh as Huchchaiah
- Master Adithya as Anand alias Aa / Stampu
- M. S. Umesh as Thippayya
- Bangalore Nagesh as Sandeharao
- Annapoorna as Bava's mother
- Rekha Das as Municipality Commissioner Rekha Koirala
- Manju Malini as Bala Kumari

== Soundtrack ==
The music of the film was composed by Raj–Koti with lyrics by R. N. Jayagopal.

Track listing
| No. | Title | Lyrics | Singer(s) | Length |
|---|---|---|---|---|
| 1. | "Ammayya Ammayya" | R. N. Jayagopal | S. P. Balasubrahmanyam & Manjula Gururaj |
| 2. | "Meghavu Hariside" | R. N. Jayagopal | S. P. Balasubrahmanyam & K. S. Chithra |
| 3. | "Lamba Chikka" | R. N. Jayagopal | Malgudi Subha |
| 4. | "Kannu Bitthu" | R. N. Jayagopal | S. P. Balasubrahmanyam & Manjula Gururaj |
| 5. | "Ek Do Teen" | R. N. Jayagopal | S. P. Balasubrahmanyam & Manjula Gururaj |
