= Priyuraalu =

Indian romantic drama film

- Release poster
- Directed by: G. V. Rama Raju
- Story by: Sri Sowmya
- Produced by: Ramaraju; Ajay Karlapudi
- Starring: Prithvi Medavaram; Kalapala Mounika
- Cinematography: Mahi P. Reddy
- Edited by: Sai Revanth
- Music by: Sunil Kashyap
- Release date: 17 September 2021
- Country: India
- Language: Telugu

Priyuraalu is a 2021 Indian Telugu-language romantic drama film directed by G. V. Rama Raju and starring Prudhvi Medavaram and Mounika. The film streamed on SonyLIV on 17 September 2021.

== Cast ==
- Prudhvi Medavaram as Madhav
- Mounika as Divya
- Kaushik Reddy as Watchman
- Kamakshi Bhaskarla as Sarita
- Jogi Naidu
- Varsha
- Krishnam Raju

== Production ==
The film was mostly shot from January to February of 2020 but was delayed because of the COVID-19 pandemic.

== Reception ==
A critic from OTTplay wrote that "The film presents a realistic take on extramarital relationships and explores the thin line between love and desire".
