= Dead Pixels (Indian TV series) =

Indian Fantasy comedy series

- Promotional poster
- Genre: Fantasy comedy
- Based on: Dead Pixels by Jon Brown
- Written by: Akshay Polla
- Screenplay by: Aditya Mandala
- Directed by: Aditya Mandala
- Starring: Niharika Konidela; Akshay Lagusani; Sai Ronak; Harsha Chemudu; Rajeev Kanakala; Bhavana Sagi
- Music by: Sidhartha Sadasivuni
- Country of origin: India
- Original language: Telugu
- No. of seasons: 1
- No. of episodes: 6

Production
- Executive producer: Rohith Pisapati
- Producers: Saideep Reddy Borra; Sameer Gogate; Rahul Tamada
- Cinematography: Fahad Abdul Majeed
- Editor: Srujana Adusumilli
- Camera setup: Multi-camera
- Production companies: BBC Studios India; Tamada Media Ltd

Original release
- Network: Disney+ Hotstar
- Release: 19 May 2023

Dead Pixels is an Indian Telugu-language fantasy comedy television series written by Akshay Polla and directed by Aditya Mandala. The series was produced by Saideep Reddy Borra, Sameer Gogate and Rahul Tamada under BBC Studios India and Tamada Media Ltd. banners. It stars Niharika Konidela, Akshay Lagusani, Sai Ronak, Harsha Chemudu, Rajeev Kanakala and Bhavana Sagi in lead roles. It premiered on Disney+ Hotstar on 19 May 2023.

The series is a remake of the British comedy series Dead Pixels.

== Plot ==
Gayathri, Bhargav, and Anand share a deep passion for the video game "Battle of Thrones," shaping their personal and professional lives. Their pursuit of completing the game takes an unexpected turn with the arrival of Roshan in Gayathri's workplace. Roshan, seamlessly integrated into their gaming group, injects new dynamics into their relationships, both in the virtual world and reality. As the quartet faces unforeseen challenges, navigates evolving relationships, and grapples with the transformative impact of Roshan, the central question lingers: Did they successfully conquer the Battle of Thrones game? With differing opinions within the group, the narrative unfolds with a blend of facts and varied perspectives, maintaining a balanced tone.

== Cast ==
- Niharika Konidela as Gayathri
- Akshay Lagusani as Bhargav
- Harsha Chemudu (Viva Harsha) as Anand
- Sai Ronak as Roshan
- Bhavana Sagi as Aishwarya
- Rajeev Kanakala as Bhargav's father
- Bindu Chandramouli as Bhargav's mother
- Jayshree Rachakonda as Roshan's mother

== Episodes ==
=== Series overview ===
Series	Episodes	Originally released
1	6	19 May 2023

=== Season 1 (2023) ===
No. overall	No. in season	Title	Directed by	Written by	Original release date
1	1	"Big Green Women"	Aditya Mandala	Akshay Polla	19 May 2023
2	2	"Motherless Boy"	Aditya Mandala	Akshay Polla	19 May 2023
3	3	"The Wedding"	Aditya Mandala	Akshay Polla	19 May 2023
4	4	"The House Party"	Aditya Mandala	Akshay Polla	19 May 2023
5	5	"Red light cafe"	Aditya Mandala	Akshay Polla	19 May 2023
6	6	"The Final Battle"	Aditya Mandala	Akshay Polla	19 May 2023

== Reception ==
A critic from 123telugu gave the series 2/5 stars and stated that "Dead Pixels is a series that caters predominantly to gamers, showcasing commendable performances from Niharika and the cast. Nevertheless, the show may challenge viewers' patience with its lackluster storyline and narration. If you're not a gamer, skipping this series seems like a reasonable decision without any hesitation."

Paul Nicodemus of The Times of India gave the series 2.5/5 stars and stated that In the series, "Niharika Konidela stands out with her impeccable acting skills, while Akshay Lagusani effectively portrays the introverted gamer. Harsha adds entertainment as a gaming comrade, and Bhavana Sagi excels as a sensible friend and flatmate. Despite strong performances, character backgrounds, except for Bhargav, remain unclear, limiting broader audience connection. The gaming-centric humor might not engage non-gamers fully, making the series more niche in appeal, catering primarily to gaming enthusiasts."

A Critic from Eenadu wrote that "Niharika's captivating interpretation of the character Gayatri, complemented by exceptional performances from Bhargav, Akshay, and Sai Ronak, enhances the overall appeal of the series. Nevertheless, despite the evident technical proficiency, critiques indicate a requirement for more robust writing, emphasizing the necessity for the writer and director to enhance their craft."

Maragani Govardhan of Hindustan Times gave the series 2.25/5 stars and wrote In the heat of intense gaming, "Dead Pixels emerge as unwelcome distractions, disrupting the immersive experience and pulling focus from critical gameplay moments. For dedicated gamers, these glitches become irksome blemishes, detracting from the visual splendor of their virtual adventures."

Avad Mohammad of OTTPlay gave the series 2/5 stars and stated that "Dead Pixels on Hotstar presents an unconventional storyline complemented by a cast delivering commendable performances. Despite the engaging characters, the series is faulted for its limited emotional depth, occasionally veering into over-the-top territory. Notably, Niharika Konidela's portrayal is a revelation, particularly appealing to gaming enthusiasts. However, for a broader audience, the show may seem whimsical and unnecessarily prolonged."

A Critic from Sakshi TV gave the series 2.75/5 stars and stated that "Niharika personifies the carefree spirit of Gayatri with a remarkable urban flair, skillfully complemented by the performances of Akshay Lagosani, Bhavana Sagi, and the rest of the cast, who add significant depth to their respective roles. Tamada Media Pvt Ltd's dedication to excellence is evident in this technically sound exploration of the interplay between online gaming and real-world dynamics."

== See also ==
- The Guild (web series)
- List of Disney+ Hotstar original programming
