= Oka Manasu =

- Film poster
- Directed by: G. V. Rama Raju
- Written by: G. V. Rama Raju
- Produced by: Madhura Sreedhar Reddy; Dr.Krishna Bhatta (KKNKTV); A. Abhinay
- Starring: Naga Shourya; Niharika Konidela
- Cinematography: Raam Reddy
- Edited by: Dharmendra Kakarala
- Music by: Sunil Kashyap
- Production companies: Madhura Entertainment; TV9 & KKNKTV
- Release date: 24 June 2016
- Running time: 146 minutes
- Country: India
- Language: Telugu

Oka Manasu (transl. One Heart) is a 2016 Telugu romantic drama film written and directed by G. V. Rama Raju. It features Naga Shourya and Niharika Konidela in the lead roles, which marks Niharika's acting debut and debut in Telugu cinema. The film was released worldwide on 24 June 2016.

== Plot ==
Sandhya, a medical student, falls deeply in love at first sight with Surya, a youngster with political aspirations. Surya does small-time ‘settlements’ as he awaits a chance to contest at the local elections. Sandhya understands that the path ahead of her is not easy when she sees Surya roughing up people every now and then. Her mother suggests Surya to leave politics for her daughter, but Surya does not agree and follows his path because of his father's wish to see his son as an MLA. One of the settlements later becomes a serious issue, leading to an FIR being filed on Surya for S.C., S.T. atrocities, and he is arrested on those charges. After knowing Surya's arrest, Sandhya decides to wait for him but her mother convinces her to shift from Vijaya Nagaram to Vizag on hopes to forget Surya.

Three years later Surya is released on bail using the high influence from his uncle, who is an MLA belonging to the opposition party in Vizag. Surya and tries to make a settlement to cancel the case on him. He learns that one of his friends betrayed him for his political aspirations, became an approver, and is now a municipal chairman to the Vijayanagara district. Surya meets him for a compromise, it leads to a fight, and the situation becomes worse. Surya's father appoints Satya, a practical man with no sentiments, as his advisor. They become good friends rather than a boss and employee because of Satya's straightforward nature and his loyalty towards him. Later in Vizag, Surya meets Sandhya and advises her to leave him because of his situation as there is no guarantee on his future, but Sandhya refuses to leave him and replies that she will wait for him for her entire life. Satya supports her decision and advises Surya to keep it as a secret until the problem is solved. Surya and Sandhya start a live-in relationship without her mother's will. Surya starts helping in his uncle's election campaign.

During the election campaign, a person starts attacking Surya's uncle, who once expected a MLA ticket but was refused under the grounds of financial backup. Surya protects his uncle and beats the person up. Satya understands that he is showing his frustration on him because of Sandhya. Impressed by his actions, Surya's uncle gives him an opportunity to contest as an MLA and is ready to make him his political heir on the condition that Surya marry his daughter, who is a spoilt divorcée. Surya's father and Satya support this and try to convince Surya for the marriage as this will solve his case and to achieve his ambition. Surya refuses to betray Sandhya but remembers his father's dream and lies to her that his bail was cancelled. He instructs to start a new life without him, but Sandhya does not listen to him and tells him that she will wait for him forever. Later, through Surya's father, she understands his situation (Surya's father knew their relationship through Surya earlier). Sandhya decides to leave him but for two conditions: he must achieve his ambition, and she asks him to spend some time with him for a couple of days, to which he accepts.

After two days, in the morning, when Surya tries to wake Sandhya up on the bed, realizes that she committed suicide. He finds a note beside her which tells him that she has fulfilled her dreams with him and she will wait for him in the next life. The film ends with Surya remembering her memories on her grave.

== Cast ==
- Naga Shourya as Surya
- Niharika Konidela as Sandhya, Surya’s love interest
- Rao Ramesh as Surya's father
- Krishna Bhagavan
- Radio Mirchi RJ Hemanth
- Srinivas Avasarala as Satya
- Vennela Kishore as Sandhya’s brother
- Pragathi as Sandhya's mother
- Roshan Kanakala

== Soundtrack ==
Oka Manasu's audio has nine tracks, all composed by Sunil Kashyap. Songs were penned by Ramajogayya Sastry and Bhaskarabhatla Ravikumar. The music was launched on May 18, 2016 with members of mega families like Nagendra Babu, Ram Charan, Varun Tej, Sai Dharam Tej, Allu Arjun as chief guests.

The album received positive reviews from the audiences.

Track list
No.	Title	Lyrics	Artist(s)	Length
1.	"O Manasa" (Male)	Ramajogayya Sastry	Yazin Nizar	04:54
2.	"Hrudayama"	Ramajogayya Sastry	Vijay Yesudas, Swetha Mohan	04:04
3.	"Ninna Lenantha"	Bhaskarabhatla Ravikumar	Vedala Hemachandra, Ramya Behara	03:34
4.	"Chirugali Aagipove"	Ramajogayya Sastry	Vedala Hemachandra, Sameera Bharadwaj	04:09
5.	"O Manasa" (Female)	Ramajogayya Sastry	Shreya Ghoshal	04:54
6.	"Emito Ee Kshanam"	Bhaskarabhatla Ravikumar	Vedala Hemachandra, Pranavi	04:58
7.	"Nee Manasuna"	Ramajogayya Sastry	Vijay Prakash	04:19
8.	"Amrutha Varshini" (Instrumental)			02:56
9.	"O Manasa" (Instrumental)			03:43
Total length:				37:31
