= Maya (2001 film) =

2001 film by Digvijay Singh

- DVD cover
- Directed by: Digvijay Singh
- Written by: Emmanuel Pappas; Digvijay Singh
- Produced by: Emmanuel Pappas; Dileep Singh Rathore; Raj Singh
- Starring: Nitya Shetty; Mita Vasisht; Anant Nag; Nikhil Yadav
- Cinematography: Mark Lapwood
- Edited by: Bridget Lyon
- Music by: Manesh Judge; Noor Lodhi
- Distributed by: Kundalini Pictures
- Release dates: 7 September 2001 (India); 16 January 2002 (US)
- Running time: 105 minutes
- Countries: India; Australia
- Language: Hindi

Maya is a 2001 Hindi-language coming-of-age drama film directed by Digvijay Singh with Nitya Shetty, Mita Vashisht, Anant Nag and Nikhil Yadav in lead roles. The film is an Indo-Australian co-production.

== Plot ==
Sanjay (Nikhil Yadav) and his cousin Maya (Nitya Shetty) are carefree 12-year-old village kids. They spend their days creating trouble, throwing rocks, and stealing sweets. They are gently scolded but loved by Sanjay's mother (Mita Vasisht) and father (Anant Nag). Their life is idyllic and warm.

But when Maya reaches puberty and has her first period, everything changes in the space of just a few days. The family heads to the neighboring village of Maya's parents to prepare for a mysterious ritual rape ceremony marking Maya's transition to womanhood. Maya, who only dimly understands what is happening to her, is told that she is no longer a child and discouraged from her familiar play with Sanjay. Sanjay, with even less understanding, fights against the separation from his playmate and acts out, angering his father. Then, when the day of the ritual arrives, over the terrified protests of Sanjay, Maya is subjected to the trauma of ritual rape in the temple, which is truly shocking and horrible.

== Cast ==
- Anant Nag as Arun
- Mita Vasisht as Lakshmi
- Nitya Shetty as Maya
- Nikhil Yadav as Sanjay
- Veerendra Saxena as Priest
- Mukesh Bhatt as Ganesh
- Shilpa Navalkar as Mridu
- Shreechand Makhija as Candyman

== Reception ==
Eddie Cockrell of Variety wrote, "A horrific cultural ceremony lurks around the corner for a well-to-do and seemingly happy Indian family in Digvijay Singh's sunny but sinister 'Maya,' an undeniably powerful story of officially sanctioned child abuse made all the more ghastly by its apparent accuracy".

Preston Jones of DVD Talk wrote, "While the first hour of Maya is relatively light-hearted and engaging, the final 40 minutes are brutal. The rape sequence (Maya is between 12 and 13 years old) isn't explicitly depicted, but the expressionistic way in which it's handled still thoroughly disturbs".

Travis Mackenzie Hoover of Film Freak Central rated the film three out of four stars and wrote, "Maya is a surprisingly natural movie that could have easily degenerated into histrionics. Despite dealing with an outlawed but still-active Indian ceremony in which newly-pubescent girls are raped, it never resorts to sensationalistic horror".

== Accolades ==
- Toronto International Film Festival 2001 | 1st Runner-Up People's Choice Award
- Montreal World Film Festival | Nominated – Grand Prix De Amerique
- Flanders International Film Festival | Nominated Golden Spur and Winner Critics Mention – Music
- Chicago International Film Festival | Critics Special Mention – Nitya Shetty & Nikhal Yadav
- 25th Asian American International Film Festival | Remy Martin Emerging Director of 2002
- Australian Cinematography Society | GOLD Award & Distinction for Cinematography
