= Pressure Cooker (2020 film) =

Indian Telugu-language comedy drama film

- Theatrical release poster
- Directed by: Sujoi Karampuri; Sushil Karampuri
- Written by: Sujoi Karampuri; Sushil Karampuri
- Produced by: Sujoi Karampuri; Sushil Karampuri; Appi Reddy
- Starring: Sai Ronak; Preethi Asrani
- Cinematography: Nagesh Banell; Anith Madadi
- Edited by: Naresh Reddy Jonna
- Music by: Harshavardhan Rameshwar; Sunil Kashyap; Rahul Sipligunj; Smaran
- Production companies: Karampuri Kreations; Mic Movies
- Distributed by: Abhishek Pictures; Suresh Productions
- Release date: 21 February 2020
- Country: India
- Language: Telugu

Pressure Cooker is a 2020 Indian Telugu-language comedy drama film directed by Sujoi Karampuri and Sushil Karampuri. The film features Sai Ronak and Preethi Asrani in the lead roles. The film was released on 21 February 2020. The film is about the pressure from an engineering graduate's father to study abroad similar to when a pressure cooker is finished cooking.

== Cast ==
- Sai Ronak as Kishore
- Preethi Asrani as Anitha
- Rahul Ramakrishna as Chandrasekhar, Kishore's friend
- Rajai Rowan as Pawan, Kishore's friend
- Tanikella Bharani as Anand Rao
- C. V. L. Narasimha Rao as Narayana, a farmer and Kishore's father
- Jhansi as Anitha's mother
- Raj Madiraju as Anitha's father
- Sangeetha as Sunanda Rao
- Ravi Varma as Harish "Harry" Rao, Anand Rao and Sunanda's son
- Kireeti Damaraju as Manohar Rao, Anand Rao and Sunanda's son
- Uttej as Shiva Reddy, the head of EZ Visa Consultants
- Keshav Deepak as the owner of Microinfo company

== Soundtrack ==
Pressure Cooker

Soundtrack album by Sunil Kashyap, Rahul Sipligunj, Smaran, Harshavardhan Rameshwar
- Released: 2019
- Recorded: 2019
- Genre: Feature film soundtrack
- Length: 28:00
- Label: Aditya Music
External audio
- Official Audio Jukebox on YouTube

The music is composed by Sunil Kashyap, Rahul Sipligunj, Smaran, and Harshavardhan Rameshwar, and was released under the Aditya Music label.

Track list
No.	Title	Lyrics	Music	Singer(s)	Length
1.	"Gamaninchindi"	Ananta Sriram	Harshavardhan Rameshwar	Sindhu	3:17
2.	"Ra Ra Kodaka"	Satya	Harshavardan Rameshwar	Anurag Kulkarni	4:58
3.	"Nee Hrudayam"	Shreshta	Sunil Kashyap	Aditi Bhavaraju	4:46
4.	"Cheli Cheli"	Sirasri	Sunil Kasyap	Kailash Kher	3:06
5.	"Oggu Katha"	Oggu Ellaiah, Oggu Shivaiah	Smaran	Oggu Ellaiah, Oggu Shivaiah	2:01
6.	"Orivari"	Niklesh Sunkoji	Smaran	Suresh Bobbili	2:58
7.	"Nuvu Bagga Pandkunte (Saami Lingo)"	Rahul Sipligunj	Rahul Sipligunj	Rahul Sipligunj	3:03
8.	"America Poyi Nuvaitvra Langa"	Rahul Sipligunj	Rahul Sipligunj	Rahul Sipligunj	3:51
Total length:					28:00

== Home media ==
The digital rights of the film was sold to AHA. The film is now available on AHA. Also streaming in Amazon Prime Video

== Reception ==
A critic from The Hindu noted that "This one [film] is more like television serial but even serials are high on drama and emotions". A critic from The Times of India gave the film a rating of two-and-a-half out of five stars and stated that "Pressure Cooker pretends to be fresh, but is a regular and cliché fare that manages to work". A critic from Telangana Today wrote that "The theme of Sujoi and Sushil evokes interest among audiences but screenplay is a bit disappointing."
