= Maa Oori Polimera 2 =

- Theatrical release poster
- Directed by: Anil Vishwanath
- Written by: Anil Vishwanath
- Produced by: Gowr Kriesna
- Starring: Satyam Rajesh; Kamakshi Bhaskarla
- Cinematography: Kushendar Ramesh Reddy
- Edited by: Sri Vaara
- Music by: Gyaani
- Production company: Shree Krishna Creations
- Release date: 3 November 2023 (India)
- Running time: 127 minutes
- Country: India
- Language: Telugu

Maa Oori Polimera 2 is a 2023 Indian Telugu language thriller film directed by Anil Vishwanath. A sequel to Maa Oori Polimera (2021), the film stars Satyam Rajesh and Kamakshi Bhaskarla.

== Cast ==
- Satyam Rajesh as Komaraiah
- Kamakshi Bhaskarla as Lachimi
- Getup Srinu as Balija
- Rakendu Mouli as Ravindra Naik
- Chitram Srinu as Ramesh
- Sahithi Dasari as Ramula
- Baladitya as Jangaiah (cameo appearance)
- Ravi Varma as Sarpanch
- Babloo Prithiveeraj

== Reception ==
Jeevi of Idlebrain.com rated the film 2.75 out of 5 and wrote that "Despite being “A” certified film and despite having some issues, Maa Oori Pelimera has elements to thrill the masses and is a preferable film to those who love these kinds of thrillers". A critic from OTTplay rated the film 3.5 out of 5 stars and wrote that "Maa Oori Polimera 2 has all the ingredients to entice a thriller-junkie with a restless, twist-a-minute screenplay (with an overdose of flashbacks) backed by commendable performances". A critic from The South First wrote that "The story of Maa Oori Polimera 2 lacks freshness. With a few unexcited and below-par twists, director Anil Vishwanath fails to add the required ingredients to make a mystery thriller, eventually making this sequel less spooky and eerie".
