= Nanna Koochi =

2019 Indian web series by Pranith Bramandpally

- Genre: Drama
- Directed by: Pranith Bramandapally
- Starring: Niharika Konidela; Nagendra Babu; Poondla Abhijeeth
- Narrated by: Varun Tej
- Theme music composer: Kaala Bhairava
- Composer: Karthik Rodriguez
- Country of origin: India
- Original language: Telugu
- No. of episodes: 8

Production
- Producer: Niharika Konidela
- Production locations: Hyderabad, India
- Cinematography: Vidya Sagar; Akhilesh
- Editor: Vidya Sagar
- Running time: 19-27 minutes
- Production company: Pink Elephant Pictures

Original release
- Network: ZEE5
- Release: 12 February 2018

Nanna Koochi (Translation: Daddy Koochi) is a 2018 Indian Telugu-language drama web series directed by Pranith Bramandapally and produced by Niharika Konidela through Pink Elephant Pictures. The series has an ensemble cast of Niharika Konidela, Nagendra Babu and Poondla Abhijeeth. The 8-episodes series premiered on ZEE5 on 12 February 2018. It is the first Telugu-language web series on ZEE5.

== Cast ==
- Niharika Konidela as Tara
- Nagendra Babu as Anandraj
- Poondla Abhijeeth as Luv
- Sivaji Raja
- Neelya Bhavani as Parvathi
- Jabaradasth Rakesh as Banthi
- Bhavana Rao
- Master Bharath
- Kalki Raja
- Karthik Appala

== Production ==
After producing successful series Muddapappu Avakai, Niharika again produced this web series. Filming took place in Hyderabad in late 2017.

== Episodes ==
There are eight episodes written and directed by Pranith Bramandapally. Niharika is the dialogue writer along with Pranith.

No.	Directed by	Written by	Original release date
1	Pranith Bramandapally	Pranith Bramandapally	12 February 2018
2	Pranith Bramandapally	Pranith Bramandapally	12 February 2018
3	Pranith Bramandapally	Pranith Bramandapally	12 February 2018
4	Pranith Bramandapally	Pranith Bramandapally	12 February 2018
5	Pranith Bramandapally	Pranith Bramandapally	12 February 2018
6	Pranith Bramandapally	Pranith Bramandapally	12 February 2018
7	Pranith Bramandapally	Pranith Bramandapally	12 February 2018
8	Pranith Bramandapally	Pranith Bramandapally	12 February 2018

== Reception ==
Karthik Keramulu of Firstpost wrote that Nanna Koochi is one of the better Telugu web series even though its essence isn't all that powerful in the face of Tamil series like As I'm Suffering From Kadhal and Livin’. He also added that Kaala Bhairava's background score packs a solid punch. It's pleasing to the ears and all the other senses. The theme music that pops up during the beginning and end credits deserve a lot of love and multiple listenings.
