= Satyam Rajesh =

Indian actor

- Born: Rajesh Babu; 12 April 1979 (age 47); Visakhapatnam, Andhra Pradesh, India
- Education: MBA
- Occupation: Actor
- Spouse: Pallavi Raju
- Children: 1

Rajesh Babu, better known as Satyam Rajesh, is an Indian actor who primarily appears in Telugu films. He has worked in more than 350 films. Rajesh got the moniker 'Satyam' following his appearance in the 2003 film of the same name.

== Early life ==
Rajesh was born in Visakhapatnam as Rajesh Babu. His father is a retired telecom employee and his mother is a homemaker. He studied MBA and worked in Mahindra. He got transferred to Hyderabad as a part of his job, which is when he sought opportunities for acting in Telugu films.

== Filmography ==
Telugu films

- Jorugaa Husharugaa (2002)
- Sreeram (2002)
- Nee Sneham (2002)
- Neeke Manasichaanu (2003)
- Sambaram (2003)
- Satyam (2003)
- Jai (2004)
- Varsham (2004)
- Gharshana (2004)
- Mass (2004)
- Keelu Gurram (2005)
- Nireekshana (2005)
- Sri (2005)
- Narasimhudu (2005)
- Pokiri (2006)
- Kithakithalu (2006)
- Oka V Chitram (2006)
- Asadhyudu (2006)
- Game (2006)
- Desamuduru (2007)
- Chandamama (2007)
- Hello Premistara (2007)
- Chirutha (2007)
- Tulasi (2007)
- Takkari (2007)
- Swagatam (2008)
- John Apparao 40 Plus (2008)
- Jalsa (2008)
- Krishnarjuna (2008)
- Kantri (2008)
- Nagaram (2008)
- Krishna (2008)
- Bommana Brothers Chandana Sisters (2008)
- Bujjigadu (2008)
- Siddu from Sikakulam (2008)
- Baladoor (2008)
- Hero (2008)
- Neninthe (2009)
- Kavya's Diary (2009)
- Ride (2009)
- Boni (2009)
- Kasko (2009)
- Indumathi (2010)
- Maa Nanna Chiranjeevi (2010)
- Comedy Express (2010)
- Seeta Ramula Kalyanam (2010)
- Aakasa Ramanna (2010)
- Dammunnodu (2010)
- Vedam (2010)
- Don Seenu (2010)
- Komaram Puli (2010)
- Kusu Machan Karupu (2010)
- Vastadu Naa Raju (2010)
- Gaganam (2011)
- Aha Naa Pellanta (2011)
- Wanted (2011)
- Raaj (2011)
- 100% Love (2011)
- Daggaraga Dooranga (2011)
- Em Babu Laddu Kavala (2012)
- Six (2012)
- Poola Rangadu (2012)
- Denikaina Ready (2012)
- Krishnam Vande Jagadgurum (2012)
- Jagan Nirdoshi (2013)
- Vasool Raja (2013)
- Mirchi (2013)
- Balupu (2013)
- Naayak (2013)
- Potugadu (2013)
- April Fool (2014)
- Amrutham Chandamamalo (2014)
- Kotha Janta (2014)
- Geethanjali (2014)
- Oka Laila Kosam (2014)
- Loukyam (2014)
- Ra Ra Krishnayya (2014)
- Aagadu (2014)
- Lakshmi Raave Maa Intiki (2014)
- Gaddam Gang (2015)
- Jyothi Lakshmi (2015)
- Dohchay (2015)
- Pandaga Chesko (2015)
- Courier Boy Kalyan (2015)
- Soukhyam (2015)
- Sankarabharanam (2015)
- Kshanam (2016)
- Vinodham 100% (2016)
- Nayaki (2016)
- Krishna Gaadi Veera Prema Gaadha (2016)
- Gentleman (2016)
- Supreme (2016)
- Andhhagadu (2017)
- Samanthakamani (2017)
- Mister (2017)
- Raja The Great (2017)
- Jawaan (2017)
- Fidaa (2017)
- Lanka (2017)
- Sarasudu (2017)
- Tholi Prema (2018) (Deleted Scenes)
- Touch Chesi Chudu (2018)
- Brand Babu (2018)
- Jamba Lakidi Pamba (2018)
- Vijetha (2018)
- Lover (2018)
- Lakshmi (2018)
- Srinivasa Kalyanam (2018)
- Nartansala (2018)
- Kavacham (2018)
- F2 (2019)
- Viswamitra (2019)
- Chikati Gadilo Chithakotudu (2019)
- Prati Roju Pandage (2019)
- Bhagyanagara Veedullo Gamattu (2019)
- Orey Bujjiga (2020)
- Disco Raja (2020)
- Raahu (2020)
- Bangaru Bullodu (2021)
- Rang De (2021)
- Maa Oori Polimera (2021)
- Power Play (2021)
- Sridevi Soda Center (2021)
- Manchi Rojulochaie (2021)
- WWW (2021)
- Drushyam 2 (2021)
- Sarkaru Vaari Paata (2022)
- Hero (2022)
- Ginna (2022)
- Masooda (2022)
- Dhamaka (2022) as Eveteaser
- Top Gear (2022) as Rajesh
- Kalyanam Kamaneeyam (2023) as Bushan
- Amigos (2023)
- Katha Venuka Katha (2023)
- Maa Oori Polimera 2 (2023)
- Vey Dharuvey (2024)
- Geethanjali Malli Vachindi (2024)
- Tenant (2024)
- Artiste (2025)
- Mr. Bachchan (2024)
- Coffee with a Killer (2025)
- Thala (2025)
- Mad Square (2025)
- Paderu 12th Mile (2025)
- Tribanadhari Barbarik (2025)
- Vishnu Vinyasam (2026)
- Ustaad Bhagat Singh (2026)

Tamil films

- Idhu Namma Aalu (2016)
- Nayagi (2016)
- Lakshmi (2018)

=== Television ===
- 3 Roses (2021) on Aha

=== As voice actor ===
- Chaams - Gaganam
