= Nandi Award for Best Child Actress =

Indian film award

This is a list of the winners of the Nandi Award for Best Child Actress and the films they have won for.

The Nandi Award for Best Child Actress winners since 1977:

Year	Best Child Actress	Film
2016	Raina Rao	Manamantha
2015	Baby Karunya	Daana Veera Soora Karna
2014	Anuhya	Atreya
2013	Pranavi	Uyyala Jampala
2012	Rushini	Minugurulu
2011	Baby Annie	Rajanna
2009	Baby Gayathri	My Name is Amrutha
2008	Divya Nagesh	Arundhati
2007	Baby Varshini	Amulyam
2006	Sri Divya	Bharati
2005	Baby Aswini & Baby Trisha	Gulabilu
2004	Bakhita Francis; Baby Jyothy	Anand; Amma Nanna Lekunte
2003	Baby Nandini	Nandini
2002	Swetha	Jayam
2001	Baby Nithya	Little Hearts
2000	Baby Suhani	Hindustan The Mother
1998	Baby Nithya	Chinni Chinni Aasa
1997	Swathi	Ramayanam
1996	Baby Kavya Annapureddy	Little Soldiers
1993	Baby Nikhita	Mayalodu
1988	Baby Shalini	Brahma Putrudu
1979	Baby Thulasi	Sankarabharanam
1978	Baby Thulasi	Seetamalakshmi
1977	Baby Rani	Panthulamma
