= Sai Ronak =

Indian Telugu actor

- Born: Sai Kiran; 9 October 1991 (age 35)
- Occupation: Actor
- Years active: 2014–present

Sai Ronak is an Indian actor and dancer who predominantly works in Telugu cinema. He is known for his role in the film Pressure Cooker.

== Career ==
Sai Ronak was born as Sai Kiran. While studying engineering, he acted in several films including Paathasala (2014), Guppedantha Prema (2016), and Kaadhali (2017). In The Times of India review of Kaadhali, Ch Sushil Rao wrote that "Sai Ronak and Harish Kalyan had put up sterling performances". He later went on to open his own dance studio in Hyderabad called Hy Dance Studio. In 2020, he starred in Pressure Cooker. Regarding his performance, Thadhagath Pathi of The Times of India wrote that "Sai Ronak performed well in the lead role and has an impressive screen presence. He carried the role well and if he continues to grow, is a talent to watch out for".

== Filmography ==
Key
†	Denotes films that have not yet been released

Year	Title	Role	Notes
2014	Paathasala	Adi	
2016	Guppedantha Prema	Yuv	
2017	Lanka	Sai	
2017	Kaadhali	Kranti	
2018	Masakali	Suriya	
2020	Pressure Cooker	Kishore	
2021	Chalo Premiddam	Atma Rao	
2021	Bro	Savyasachi	
2022	Ante Sundaraniki	Vamsi	Cameo appearance
2022	Odela Railway Station	Anudeep	
2022	Raajahyogam	Rishi	
2023	Popcorn	Pavan	
2023	Kanulu Therichinaa Kanulu Moosinaa	Puneeth	
2023	Circle	Kailash	
2023	Nireekshana	Gautham	Only dubbed version released
2024	Rewind	Karthik	
2024	Laggam	Chaitanya	
2025	Viral Prapancham	Ravi	
2025	Aaryan	Kailash	Tamil film

=== Television ===
Year	Title	Role	Network	Notes
2021	3 Roses	Chandu	Aha	
2023	Dead Pixels	Roshan	Disney+ Hotstar	
2026	The Traitors(Telugu)	Himself	Prime Video	
