= Aivarattam =

2015 Indian Tamil-language film by Mithun Manickam

- Directed by: Mithun Manickam
- Starring: Niranjan Jayaprakash; Nithya Shetty
- Edited by: Sathish Suriya
- Music by: Swaminathan
- Production company: Shuba Sendhil Pictures
- Release date: 13 March 2015
- Country: India
- Language: Tamil

Aivarattam (transl. Five games) is a 2015 Indian-Tamil-language sports drama film starring Niranjan Jayaprakash and Nithya Shetty in the lead roles with Dushyanth Jayaprakash in an important role.

== Cast ==
- Niranjan Jayaprakash as Raghu
- Nithya Shetty as Rathna
- Dushyanth Jayaprakash as Kumar
- Jayaprakash
- Rajapandi as Parthi, Raghu's Friend
- Amruth Kalam
- Lollu Sabha Manohar
- King Kong

== Production ==
The film is based on football-esque game called Aivarattam, in which there are 5 people on each team. The game is played in Sivaganga district. Jayaprakash's two sons, who starred in Easan, play brothers of opposite teams in this film while Jayaprakash was signed to play a pivotal role of a village man who supports one of the teams. Theatre artist Amruth Kalam was signed to play a supporting role. Nithya Shetty, a former Telugu child actress, was signed to play the heroine. Musician Selvaganesh's son Swaminathan composed the songs for the film. The film was shot on football fields for 12 days. Football players from six districts were arranged while a thousand people from Sivaganga district played audience members.

== Release ==
The Times of India gave the film two-and-half out of five stars and wrote that "But the biggest letdown is the climax, where the director totally abandons the game in favour of a tragic melodramatic ending that feels forced, and pointlessly ends the film on a downbeat note." A critic from The New Indian Express said that "What the director could be commended for is bringing a lesser-known game into the spotlight, and wrapping up his story in just 108 minutes". A critic from Maalai Malar also gave the film a mixed review, despite praising Jayaprakash's performance.
