= Nammanna =

- Directed by: N. Shankar
- Story by: Sanjeevi; Muthyala Subbaiah
- Based on: Anna (Telugu) (1994) by Muthyala Subbaiah
- Produced by: Balamuttaiah
- Starring: Sudeep; Anjala Zaveri; Asha Saini
- Cinematography: Sudhakar Reddy Yakkanti
- Edited by: Gautham Raju
- Music by: Gurukiran
- Production company: Sri Dhanalakshmi creations
- Release date: 18 November 2005
- Country: India
- Language: Kannada

Nammanna (transl. Our Brother) is a 2005 Indian Kannada-language action-drama film directed by N. Shankar featuring Sudeep, Anjala Zaveri and Asha Saini in the lead roles. The film features background score and soundtrack composed by Gurukiran. The film was released on 18 November 2005. This movie is dubbed in Telugu as Dowrjanyam. The film is a remake of the 1994 Telugu film Anna.

== Plot ==
A youth suspected to be a Naxalite, leaves the rural land and moves to the city, where his brother is killed by a mafia don. The youth takes the matter into his hands, kills the don and serves the poor.

== Cast ==
- Sudeep as Muttanna
- Anjala Zaveri as Anjali
- Asha Saini as Rani
- Kota Srinivasa Rao as Matka Rajendra
- Sadhu Kokila as press reporter
- Subbaraju as Marigudi
- Ashish Vidyarthi
- Ashok as Lawyer
- Mukhyamantri Chandru as Puttaraju
- Kishori Ballal
- Aravind
- Kazan Khan
- Kote Prabhakar
- Shivaram
- Usha Bhandari
- Karthik Sharma

== Production ==
Some scenes were shot at London at eight days.

== Soundtrack ==
Nammanna

Soundtrack album by Gurukiran
- Genre: Feature film soundtrack
- Language: Kannada
- Label: Jhankar Music
External audio
- Official Audio Jukebox on YouTube

The film features background score and soundtrack composed by Gurukiran and lyrics by Jayant Kaikini, Kaviraj and Goturi.

No.	Song title	Singers	Lyrics
1	"Jumbalikale"	Gurukiran	Sriranga
2	"Hodi Hodi Jatka Gadi"	Shankar Mahadevan, Anuradha Sriram	Sriranga
3	"Chellu Chellu"	K. S. Chithra, Hariharan	Kaviraj
4	"Gilli Gilli"	L. N. Shastry, Chaitra HG	Goturi
5	"Olave Kele"	K. S. Chithra, Srinivas	Kaviraj
6	"Mavayya"	Sonu Kakkar	Gurukiran

== Reception ==
A critic from Rediff.com wrote that "Nammanna is an ordinary offering from a good producer. Sudeep would do better to choose projects give his career a boost". A critic from Sify wrote that "This lavishly made action film fails to impress in spite of a good story and the presence of an actor like Sudeep". Deccan Herald wrote "Sudeep shines in his role. Kishori Ballal, Avinash, Mukhyamantri, Chandru, Sadhu Kokila play their usual part with aplomb. Gurukiran has composed the music. Songs have been picturised well".
