= Maa Oori Polimera =

- Release poster
- Directed by: Anil Vishwanath
- Written by: Anil Vishwanath
- Produced by: Madhupalli Bhogendra Gupta
- Starring: Baladitya; Satyam Rajesh; Kamakshi Bhaskarla
- Cinematography: Jagan Chavali
- Edited by: KSR
- Music by: Gyaani
- Production company: Acharya Creations
- Distributed by: Disney+ Hotstar
- Release date: 10 December 2021 (India)
- Running time: 98 minutes
- Country: India
- Language: Telugu

Maa Oori Polimera (transl. Outskirts of our village) is a 2021 Indian Telugu language thriller film written and directed by Anil Vishwanath with Baladitya, Satyam Rajesh and Kamakshi Bhaskarla in the lead roles. The film was exclusively released on the Disney+ Hotstar streaming platform. A sequel, Maa Oori Polimera 2, released in 2023.

== Plot ==
Jangaiah is an aspiring police constable who lives with his brother, Komaraiah, who is an auto driver, and his wife, Lachimi. Their neighbours are a drunkard and his wife. They live in a village where there are rumours of someone performing dark magic and chethabadi (witchcraft).

The village has a sarpanch who is ruthless and hated by everyone and harasses the women in the village, including the drunkard’s wife. When a fight breaks out between the sarpanch’s men and the drunkard, Komaraiah pleads with the sarpanch to release him. After a few days, the sarpanch mysteriously dies in a car crash.

Then a pregnant woman in the village, Kavitha, suddenly has labour pains and dies in the hospital. When the family of the woman visit a village Tantric, he tells them that someone performed black magic on her and that the culprit will have to perform the last stage of the process near the dead body, so the family should keep an eye out for anyone near it.

The family hires Malli, a watchman, to immediately inform them if someone comes near the dead body. Komaraiah enters the cemetery at this time to go to the latrine. Seeing this, Kavitha's brother hurries to the scene and kills Komaraiah by burning him alive.

After he dies, Jangaiah tries to investigate and files a case in court. It becomes a hit media sensation, but just as it seems likely to go in his favor, he withdraws his case. When confronted about why he withdrew his case, he reveals to Lachimi and his neighbour that his brother Komaraiah is the one that performed black magic on the girl and also on the sarpanch.

During his childhood, Komaraih grew up with his uncle, who taught him black magic. He was in love with Kavitha when he was in school, and after she rode with him once in his auto, he realized he couldn’t stand seeing her happy, so he decided to perform black magic on her and kill her.

It is later revealed that Komaraiah is still alive and it was Malli who caught fire and died.

== Cast ==
- Baladitya as V. Jangaiah
- Satyam Rajesh as Komaraiah
- Kamakshi Bhaskarla as Lachimi
- Getup Srinu as Balija
- Chitram Srinu as Ramesh
- Ravi Varma as Sarpanch
- Sahithi Dasari as Ramula

== Reception ==
A reviewer of Eenadu wrote "should be put It is a mistake to think that only young people want to watch OTT movie. In today's situation where internet is available at every house, it is a bit embarrassing to watch this movie with the whole family!". Srivathsan Nadadhur from OTT Play wrote "Maa Oori Polimera is another small film to spring a surprise on OTT. Despite having only a handful of familiar faces, the director Anil Vishwanath packs a punch with a taut thriller bolstered by fine performances and a riveting screenplay. Watch out for Satyam Rajesh in what's certain to be one of his finest performances, if not the best. This one is worthy of your time!"
