= Popcorn (2023 film) =

2023 Indian romantic drama film

- Theatrical release poster
- Directed by: Murali Gandham
- Written by: Murali Gandham
- Produced by: Bhogendra Gupta; Avika Gor; MS Chalapathi Raju; Seshubabu Peddinti
- Starring: Avika Gor; Sai Ronak
- Cinematography: P. Balreddy
- Edited by: KSR
- Music by: Shravan Bharadwaj
- Production companies: Acharya Creations; Avika Screen Creations
- Distributed by: MS Chalapathi Raju
- Release date: 10 February 2023
- Running time: 112 minutes
- Country: India
- Language: Telugu

Popcorn is a 2023 Indian Telugu-language romantic survival film written and directed by Murali Gandham. The film stars Avika Gor and Sai Ronak. The film's soundtrack album and background score were composed by Shravan Bharadwaj.

The film was released on 10 February 2023.

== Cast ==
- Sai Ronak as Pavan
- Avika Gor as Sameerana
- Charuhasan as Pavan's grandfather

== Production ==
The film was produced by Bhogendra Gupta under the banner of Acharya Creations and co-produced by Avika Gor, MS Chalapathi Raju, and Seshubabu Peddinti. Avika Gor makes her debut as a producer with this film. The cinematography of the film was done by MN Bal Reddy, and the editing of the film was done by KSR. The trailer for the film was released on 4 January 2023.

== Music ==
The film's soundtrack album and background score were composed by Shravan Bharadwaj, while the song "Ringu Ringu Mantu" was composed by Sreejo.

All lyrics are written by Sreejo.

Track listing
No.	Title	Music	Singer(s)	Length
1.	"Siri Siri Muvva"	Shravan Bharadwaj	Lalitha Kavya	4:07
2.	"Madhi Vihangamayye"	Shravan Bharadwaj	Benny Dayal, Ramya Behara	4:10
3.	"Ringu Ringu Mantu"	Sreejo	Sreejo	0:58
4.	"Hey Kandireega Kalla"	Shravan Bharadwaj	Karthik	2:24
5.	"Kalale Kannerai"	Shravan Bharadwaj	Kaala Bhairava	4:06
Total length:				15:45

== Release ==
=== Theatrical ===
The film was released on 10 February 2023.

=== Home media ===
The online streaming rights to the film were sold to Amazon Prime Video.

== Reception ==
Abhilasha Cherukuri of Cinema Express gave the film a rating of 2/5, stating, "Avika and Sai Ronak fail to elicit any interest in this barely persuasive story with dated treatment." Paul Nicodemus of The Times of India gave the film a rating of 2/5 and wrote, "This romantic drama featuring Avika Gor and Sai Ronak in the lead has an experimental tone; while the actors impress, it begs for better writing and screenplay. The corn kernel did not pop."

Avad Mohammad of OTTplay gave the film a rating of 2/5, stating, "Avika Gor and Sai Ronak try too hard to save the film but the narration is so bland and silly that you are forced to start looking toward the exit door." A critic from ABP Live Telugu gave the film a rating of 1.5/5 and criticized the writing and performances of the actors. A critic from The Hans India gave the film a rating of 2/5, stating, "Despite decent performances by the lead actors, the film falls short as a below-par experience."
