= Edurinti Mogudu Pakkinti Pellam =

- DVD Cover
- Directed by: Relangi Narasimha Rao
- Written by: Kaasi Viswanath; Sankarmanchi Pardhasaradhi (dialogues)
- Screenplay by: Relangi Narasimha Rao
- Story by: Relangi Narasimha Rao; Kaasi Viswanath
- Produced by: Battina Venkata Krishna Reddy
- Starring: Rajendra Prasad; Divyavani; Master Baladitya
- Cinematography: Nagendra Kumar M
- Edited by: B. Krishnam Raju
- Music by: J. V. Raghavulu
- Production company: Sri Sai Madhavi Arts
- Release date: 30 August 1991
- Running time: 136 mins
- Country: India
- Language: Telugu

Edurinti Mogudu Pakkinti Pellam (transl. Opposite House Husband-Side House Wife / Neighboring Couple) is a 1991 Indian Telugu-language comedy film directed by Relangi Narasimha Rao. It stars Rajendra Prasad, Divyavani, Master Baladitya and music composed by J. V. Raghavulu. Battina Venkatakrishna Reddy produced it under the Sri Sai Madhavi Arts banner. Relangi Narasimha Rao later remade the film in Kannada as Edurmaneli Ganda Pakkadmaneli Hendthi (1992).

== Cast ==
- Rajendra Prasad as Badhalabandee Vara Prasad / Bava
- Divyavani as Jayalakshmi
- Suthi Velu as Subbaiahlingam
- Mallikarjuna Rao as Pullayya
- Babu Mohan as Peon Appa Rao
- Raavi Kondala Rao as Manager
- Kaasi Vishwanath as Doctor
- Annapurna as Shantamma, Bava's mother
- Sri Lakshmi as writer Nagamani
- Suryakala as Bala Kumari / Baku
- Y. Vijaya as Municipal Commissioner Usha Singhal
- Master Baladitya as Sridhar

== Soundtrack ==
Edurinti Mogudu Pakkinti Pellam

Film score by J. V. Raghavulu
- Released: 1991
- Genre: Soundtrack
- Length: 21:23
- Label: Surya Music
- Producer: J. V. Raghavulu

J. V. Raghavulu chronology
Iddaru Pellala Muddula Police (1991)	Edurinti Mogudu Pakkinti Pellam (1991)	Pellaniki Premalekha Priyuraliki Subhalekha (1992)

Music composed by J. V. Raghavulu. Music released on Surya Music Company.

No.	Title	Lyrics	Singer(s)	Length
1.	"Chingu Chingu Chitukku"	Jaladi	S. P. Balasubrahmanyam, Chitra	3:50
2.	"Le Le Letha"	Jaladi	S. P. Balasubrahmanyam, Chitra	4:52
3.	"Kassu Bussu"	Pillasri	S. P. Balasubrahmanyam, Chitra	3:43
4.	"Ek Do Teen"	Sahithi	S. P. Balasubrahmanyam, Chitra	4:39
5.	"Dabbu Kharchu"	Sahithi	S. P. Balasubrahmanyam, Chitra	4:19
Total length:				21:23

== Other ==
- VCDs and DVDs on - SHALIMAR Video Company, Hyderabad
