= Mallela Theeram Lo Sirimalle Puvvu =

2013 film

- Directed by: Rama Raju V Gottimukkala
- Written by: Rama Raju V Gottimukkala
- Produced by: G Umadevi
- Starring: Kranthi; Sri Divya; George Vincent; Rao Ramesh
- Edited by: Dharmendra Kakarala
- Music by: Pavan Kurmar
- Production company: Godavari Cinema
- Release date: 5 July 2013
- Country: India
- Language: Telugu

Mallela Theeram Lo Sirimalle Puvvu is a 2013 Telugu film directed by GV Rama Raju starring Kranthi and Sri Divya in the lead roles. The film was produced by G Umadevi on Godavari Cinema Banner. The film was released on 5 July 2013.

== Cast ==
- Kranthi as Kranthi
- Sri Divya as Lakshmi
- George Vincent as Lakshmi's Husband
- Rao Ramesh as Lakshmi's Father

== Soundtrack ==
The songs were composed by Pavan Kumar.

- "Matakandani" - Nithya Santhoshini
- "Nee Needana" - Pranavi
- "Alaa Chandamaamanai" - Karunya
- "Mabbulu Kurise" - Kranthi
- "Pilla Galula Pallakilo" - Lipsika
- "Title (Theme)" - Instrumental
- "Antharmukham (Theme)" - Pranavi

== Reception ==
A critic from The Times of India gave the film a rating of two-and-a-half out of five stars and wrote " If you are the sort whose idea of romance is all about indulging in the little pleasures of life, you will love it". A critic from The Hindu stated that "Mallela Theeram Lo Sirimalle Puvvu is a beautiful title for the film that is as fresh and fragrant as jasmines". Jeevi of Idlebrain.com wrote that "Mallela Theeramlo Sirimalle Puvvu is one film which one should go and watch it for the passion with which the director has honestly attempted to make a good cinema". A critic from 123telugu wrote that "Mallelateeramlo Sirimalle Puvvu is a slow and poetic saga".
