= Madraskaaran =

Indian action film

- Theatrical release poster
- Directed by: Vaali Mohan Das
- Written by: Vaali Mohan Das
- Produced by: B. Jagadish
- Starring: Shane Nigam; Kalaiyarasan; Niharika Konidela; Aishwarya Dutta
- Cinematography: Prasanna S. Kumar
- Edited by: R. Vasanthakumar
- Music by: Sam C. S.
- Production company: SR Productions
- Release date: 10 January 2025
- Running time: 122 minutes
- Country: India
- Language: Tamil

Madraskaaran (transl. Man from Madras) is a 2025 Indian Tamil-language action film directed by Vaali Mohan Das and produced by B.Jagadish under the banner of SR Productions. The film stars Shane Nigam, Kalaiyarasan, Niharika Konidela and Aishwarya Dutta.

Madraskaaran released in theatres on 10 January 2025 and received mixed response from the critics and was a box-office flop.

== Plot ==
Sathyamoorthy is an engineer-turned-farmer who lives in Kovilpatti with his father and his wife Meera. Things take a turn when he is attacked by unknown assailants. He realizes that his nemesis, Duraisingam, has sent his henchmen to kill him. Why Singam wants to kill Sathya and whether Sathya protects his family from Singam form the story.

== Cast ==
- Shane Nigam as Sathyamoorthy "Sathya"
- Kalaiyarasan as Duraisingam
- Niharika Konidela as Meera
- Aishwarya Dutta as Kalyani
- Pandiarajan as Maadasamy
- Karunas as Chellapandi
- Super Subbarayan as Muthupandi
- Geetha Kailasam as Sathya's mother
- Raja Rani Pandian as Meera's father
- Lallu as Sathya's friend
- Deepa Shankar as Sathya's aunt
- Balaji Thiyagarajan Dayalan as Ramesh
- Siranjiivi as Kumar
- R. Sharan as Manimaran
- Vijay Vishwa as Adhisayam
- Hima Bindhu as Meera's sister
- Akayla Venkatesan as Sangeetha
- Sandeep Raviraj as Gunasekaran Pandi
- Harish Kumar as Arjun Pandi
- Gopi GPR as Doctor
- Sekar as Murugan
- S. Vijaya Raghavan as Police Inspector
- Ismath Bhanu as Nurse
- Eswari as Kalyani's mother
- KMS Muthu as Rathnapandi
- P. Kaushika as Chellapandi's daughter
- R. Manimala as Adhisayam's wife
- Mari Kumar Paramasivam as Subramani
- Nilaa Jeevan as Subramani's daughter
- Hafrein Kapoor as Arjun Pandi's wife
- Saravanan as Muthupandi's driver

== Production ==
The film is produced by B.Jagadish under the banner of SR Productions. The film's music is composed by Sam C. S. with cinematography by Prasanna S Kumar and editing by R Vasanthakumar. The film marks the debut of Shane Nigam in Tamil as the lead actor alongside Kalaiyarasan and Niharika Konidela in her second project in Tamil who was last seen in Oru Nalla Naal Paathu Solren (2018).

Principal photography began in February 2024 and took place in Chennai, Madurai and Kochi, and the entire shooting was completed in June 2024.

== Music ==
Madraskaaran

Soundtrack album by Sam C. S.
- Released: 6 January 2025
- Genre: Feature film soundtrack
- Length: 20:19
- Language: Tamil
- Label: Saregama

Sam C. S. chronology
Vanangaan (2025)	Madraskaaran (2025)

Singles from Madraskaaran
- 1. "Thai Thakka Kalyanam" Released: 18 September 2024; 2. "Kaadhal Sadugudu" Released: 7 December 2024

External audio
- Madraskaaran - Full Album on YouTube

The music is composed by Sam C. S. in his third collaboration with Shane Nigam after RDX: Robert Dony Xavier and Vela (both 2023). The first single "Thai Thakka Kalyanam" released on 18 September 2024. The second single "Kaadhal Sadugudu", the remix version of the song by the same name from Mani Rathnam's Alai Payuthey (2000) composed by A. R. Rahman was released on 7 December 2024. The pre-release audio launch event was conducted on 6 January 2025 at Sathyam Cinemas in Chennai.

Track listing
No.	Title	Lyrics	Music	Singer(s)	Length
1.	"Thai Thakka Kalyanam"	Elan	Sam C. S	Kapil Kapilan, Aparna	4:01
2.	"Kaadhal Sadugudu"	Vairamuthu	A. R. Rahman, Nandhagopan V	Adithya RK	3:13
3.	"En Saami"	Sam C. S	Sam C. S	Sam C. S	5:48
4.	"Yeandi"	Uma Devi	Sam C. S	Haricharan	4:39
5.	"Kaatrin Mozhi"	Vaali Mohan Das	Sam C. S	Sam C. S	2:38
Total length:					20:19

== Release ==
=== Theatrical ===
Madraskaaran released in theatres on 10 January 2025, coinciding Pongal weekend. The film has been certified U/A by the Central Board of Film Certification.

=== Streaming rights ===
The streaming rights of this movie were both bagged by Aha, Lionsgate Play and Amazon Prime Video.

== Reception ==
=== Critical response ===
A critic of Dinamalar rated 2.25/5 stars. Abhinav Subramanian of The Times of India gave 2/5 stars and wrote "Despite competent performances — Shane Nigam and Kalaiyarasan do their level best to rise above the din — Madraskaaran can’t overcome the weight of its own contrivances. By the end, you’re left wondering why it took so many fights and tear-stained close-ups to say so very little." Anusha Sundar of OTT Play gave 2/5 stars and wrote "Shane Nigam choosing to play a rooted Tamil character in his debut would have been more appreciable if the film too had chosen to stay grounded and simple. Even as the film has some emotional stretches to give him that space, an incoherent screenplay that doesn’t immerse you, makes Madraskaaran a letdown and wasted opportunity."

Gopinath Rajendran of The Hindu wrote "On the whole, Shane Nigam and Kalaiyarasan do their best to steer this action drama towards victory, but the contrived writing that results in convenient and predictable revelations makes Madraskaaran drive right into a wall." Malaiarasu M of News18 wrote, "Director Vali Mohan Das has tried to tell various things with a screenplay full of twists and turns, such as an unexpected accident, the events surrounding it, the pain caused by guilt, the unforgivable 'ego' of human minds, the 'tightness' that grips caste, and the 'dictatorship' of the village". Akshay Kumar of Cinema Express wrote "It is disheartening to not find a single impressive character or an overriding emotional core in a film like Madraskaaran, where the bare minimum expectation is to appeal to our senses, if not intelligence".
