= Ibbara Naduve Muddina Aata =

- Theatrical release poster
- Directed by: Relangi Narasimha Rao
- Produced by: T. M. Venkataswamy and Sricharan
- Starring: Shiva Rajkumar; Raghavendra Rajkumar; Kasthuri
- Cinematography: Nagendra Kumar M.
- Edited by: Shashikumar
- Music by: Sadhu Kokila
- Production company: S V Productions
- Release date: 12 January 1996
- Running time: 117 minutes
- Country: India
- Language: Kannada

Ibbara Naduve Muddina Aata is a 1996 Indian Kannada-language comedy-drama film directed by Relangi Narasimha Rao and produced by T. M. Venkataswamy. The film stars Shiva Rajkumar, Raghavendra Rajkumar, Kasthuri and Swarna. The film's score and soundtrack was composed by Sadhu Kokila. Cinematography was by Nagendra Kumar Mothukuri, director Relangi Narsimha Rao's long time collaborator.

This was director Relangi's second movie with Raghavendra Rajkumar after their hit comedy movie Geluvina Sardara. Relangi also went on to work with Shiva Rajkumar in another movie later - Raja. This was also the only movie in which Raghavendra Rajkumar and Shiva Rajkumar were seen together on-screen in full length roles though both of them were part of the 1990 movie Aasegobba Meesegobba which featured Raghavendra in a cameo.

== Cast ==
- Shiva Rajkumar as Shivanna
- Raghavendra Rajkumar
- Kasthuri
- Swarna
- Tara
- Srinivasa Murthy
- Mukhyamantri Chandru
- Bank Janardhan
- Umashri
- B. V. Radha
- Girija Lokesh
- Kunigal Nagabhushan

== Soundtrack ==
The soundtrack of the film was composed by Sadhu Kokila.

Track listing
No.	Title	Singer(s)	Length
1.	"Aao Pyar Kare"	S. P. Balasubrahmanyam, K. S. Chithra
2.	"Kattiruve Kacchittu"	S. P. Balasubrahmanyam, K. S. Chithra
3.	"Minichinatha Kannavanu"	K. S. Chithra
4.	"O Mama"	S. P. Balasubrahmanyam
