= Little Soldiers =

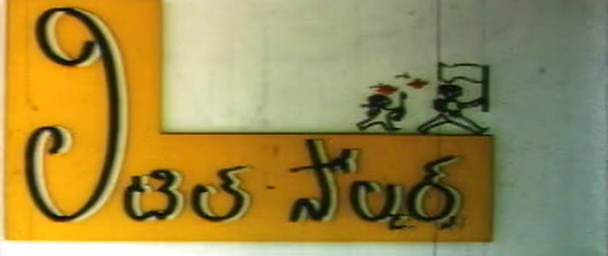
- Theatrical release poster
- Directed by: Gunnam Gangaraju
- Written by: Gunnam Gangaraju
- Produced by: Gunnam Gangaraju
- Starring: Baby Kavya; Baladitya; Heera Rajagopal; Ramesh Aravind; Rohini Hattangadi; Sudhakar; Kota Srinivasa Rao; Brahmanandam; Giri Babu
- Cinematography: Rasool Ellore
- Edited by: Mohan Ramarao
- Music by: Sri
- Distributed by: Font Films
- Release date: 2 February 1996
- Country: India
- Language: Telugu
- Budget: ₹1.06 crore

Little Soldiers is a 1996 Telugu-language children's film written, directed, and produced by Gunnam Gangaraju. The film stars Kavya, Baladitya, Kota Srinivasa Rao, and Brahmanandam, with a soundtrack composed by Sri.

Upon release, the film and the soundtrack received positive reviews. It has garnered six state Nandi Awards including the Nandi Award for Best Feature Film (silver), in addition to the National Film Award for Best Child Artist (Kavya). The film was screened at the International Film Festival of India. The film has also been dubbed in Tamil as Kutti Sippaigal.

== Plot ==
The story starts off with Bunny aged three and Sunny aged nine, who are siblings. They quarrel a lot but love each other dearly. The children in the neighborhood are cautious about the sibling duo due to the mischievous nature of Bunny. Their father Aravind is a jingle composer estranged from his father for choosing music over a career in the Army. Aravind marries Anita and raises his family without the blessings of his father. Anita is weary and has to constantly keep up with Sunny and Bunny's little tantrums.

Rajeswari, a wealthy widow of a royal family, disowns her daughter, Anita, for marrying a no-good guitar-strummer and wills her estate to her brother, Seshagiri. Some years on, Rajeswari suffers a stroke and a change of heart. She decides to bequeath her property to her daughter and sets Seshagiri to the task of locating Anita and her progeny. Seshagiri and his wastrel son who were living off Rajeswari, are jolted. With the help of a professional killer, they hatch a plan to engineer the deaths of Anita and her family in the form of an accident, so as to avoid any suspicion.

Aravind, Anita, and their two children go on a singing, road tour. They are followed by the killer in a truck. Meanwhile, Aravind explains to his children about their grandfather being an Army Major and how he fell in love with their mother. After a successful musical tour, the dreaded accident takes place on the way back home and the parents are killed. But Sunny and Bunny escape. As the two kids are alone at home, the professional killer makes an attempt to snuff them out with a gas leak. Fortunately, they are saved by their grandfather who arrives on time.

General Harischandra Prasad is living alone on a farm after retirement. On learning that his son, Aravind, and daughter-in-law, Anita have been killed in a road accident, he goes in search of his two orphaned grandchildren. He takes Sunny and Bunny to the village where they meet Gun (Bramhanandam) who befriends them. The killer tries to kill the children again by releasing a snake into the bathroom, but Sunny cleverly escapes, earning the praise of his grandfather. Seeing his bravery, Harishchandra Prasad decides to send him to a Sainik boarding school, which is only for boys. Sunny and Bunny are heartbroken at the separation and escape from the train station the next day, with only a bag containing their maternal grandmother's address, who lives in Vizag. They climb into the trunk of a car, which coincidentally happens to be the car of Seshagiri's son and the killer. On finding them in the trunk, Seshagiri's son tricks them and throws them off of a bridge into a canal. Sunny and Bunny swim to the other side of the canal and escape. They reach Vizag on a bus and try to retrieve the bag containing the address from the car. They sneak into the house with the car (which unknown to them, happens to be their grandmother's house). Seshagiri finds them and tries to hand them over to the killer but Rajeswari Devi (their grandmother) takes them in and decides to help them.

On the day of their mother's birthday, Rajeswari realizes that Sunny and Bunny are her grandchildren and that her daughter was dead. They mourn for Aravind and Anita and Rajeswari takes the children to their grandfather to make amends. Harishchandra Prasad, who realizes his mistake of forcing his dreams on his children, gladly accepts their apology and apologizes in return.

Meanwhile, Seshagiri realizes that the situation is going out of hand and plans to kill them, dump their bodies in the house and burn the house down on Diwali, on the pretext of passing it as an accident. Harishchandra Prasad takes his grandchildren to the nearby forest for camping and by the time they return, Seshagiri, his son, and the killer attack them. Bunny and Sunny escape into the forest alone and the trio of villains chase them. The resourceful Bunny and Sunny confront the killers and give them their just deserts; with the help of the traps, they set earlier with their grandfather while camping. During the chase, their grandfather arrives and joins them, and they succeed in eliminating the villains. The grandfather salutes them proudly as they turned into the soldiers he had wished for. (The credits roll.)

== Cast ==
- Baby Kavya as Bunny
- Baladitya as Sunny
- Heera Rajagopal as Anitha, Rajeswari Devi's estranged daughter
- Ramesh Aravind as Aravind, Bunny and Sunny's jolly father
- Rohini Hattangadi as Rajeswari Devi, a wealthy widow who's a dog-lover and Anitha's mother
- Kota Srinivasa Rao as Major Harishchandra Prasad
- Brahmanandam as Gun (house cook in Major's house)
- Sudhakar as Seshagiri's son
- Giri Babu as Seshagiri
- Rallapalli as Gopal
- Banerjee

== Production ==
Gunnam Gangaraju was running a greeting cards business named 'Font Cards' which was doing well at the time. But he was interested in filmmaking, so he planned to do a film. He started the film Little Soldiers with a story he had written back in 1982 or 1984. Initially, it was supposed to be produced by someone else with Gangaraju directing it. When the producer backed out, Gangaraju himself produced the film.

He said the hardest part about the film was making the three-year-old girl Kavya, who played one of the prominent characters in the film, to act. She dubbed in her own voice for all the scenes by learning Telugu in three months. As per Gangaraju, he wrote the climax booby traps sequence years before the release of Home Alone (1993).

== Soundtrack ==
The soundtrack is composed by Sri.

Song	Singer
"I Am a Very Good Girl"	Deepika, Vishnukanth
"Maa Father O Tiger"	Mano
"Adagaalanundi Oka Doubtuni"	Sri, Deepika, Vishnukanth
"Oho Vendi Vennela"	Ram Chakravarthy, M. M. Srilekha, Vishnukanth
"Sarele Vooruko Pareshaanenduko"	Sri
"Evadandi Veedu Robinhood Laa"	Mano
"Ek Do Teen, Aage Chal"	Ravi

== Reception ==
Writing for The News Minute in June 2019, Sankeertana Varma stated, "Little Soldiers plays a rather tricky yet ultimately rewarding game of perspectives where the audience is made to empathise with the character that's on screen in the scene they're watching".

== Box office ==
Gangaraju mentioned that he had invested ₹1.06 crore on the film and recovered ₹50–60 lakh from it as advances and incurred a loss of around ₹50 lakh. He feels the film would have performed better with a different publicity strategy. He also mentioned the long shooting time as a reason for the film's losses.

== Awards ==
National Film Awards

- Best Child Artist - Kavya

Nandi Awards - 1996

- Second Best Feature Film - Silver - Gunnam Gangaraju
- Best Director - Gunnam Gangaraju
- Best Screenplay Writer - Gunnam Gangaraju
- Best Character Actor - Kota Srinivasa Rao
- Best Child Actor - Master Aditya
- Best Child Actress - Baby Kavya
