= Bharati (2006 film) =

- Directed by: R. S. Raju
- Written by: P. Chandrasekhar Azad (dialogues)
- Screenplay by: R. S. Raju
- Story by: R. S. Raju
- Produced by: R. S. Raju
- Starring: Baby Sri Divya
- Cinematography: Sattibabu
- Production company: Samaikya Productions
- Release date: 2006
- Country: India
- Language: Telugu

Bharati (also known as Bharathi) is a 2006 Indian Telugu-language children's film directed by R. S. Raju and starring Baby Sri Divya in the title role. The film won three Nandi Awards.

== Cast ==
- Baby Sri Divya as Bharati
- M. Balayya as Bharati's grandfather
- Narasimha Raju
- Sampath Raj
- Master Ajay
- Sashidhar
- Madhavi
- Apoorva

== Awards ==
Nandi Awards

- Best Children Film - R. S. Raju
- Best Director of Children Film - R. S. Raju
- Child Actress – Baby Sri Divya
