= Nandi Award for Best Children Film =

Indian film award

The Nandi Award for Best Children Film was commissioned in 1978. This is a list of winners of the award and the film they won for.

Year	Film	Producer
2010	Little Buddha	Borra Ravi Kumar
2009	Nazarana	-
2007	Amulyam	Children's Film Society, India
2006	Bharati	R. S. Raju
2006	Asala Pallaki	V. Sagar
2004	Deeksha	Lamana Rao Nadendla
2003	Hero	Rajendra Prasad
2001	Kuchi Kuchi Koonamma	Sana Yadi Reddy
1999	Patha Nagaramlo Pasivadu	Akkineni Kutumba Rao
1997	Ramayanam	M. S. Reddy
1992	Teja	Ramoji Rao
1991	Bhadram Koduko	V. Ramachandra Rao & Akkineni Kutumba Rao
1986	Dr. Kokkorakko	K. Venkatarama Reddy

Second best Children Film

Year	Film	Producer
2011	Gantala Bandi	-
2009	Bunty	-
2008	Durgi	Ch. V. S. S. Bhabji; T. Balachandra Reddy
2007	O Chinnari Korika	V. V. V. Lakshmi
2006	Kittu	Bhargav
2005	Chinuku	V. Laxmana Rao
2004	Swetha Seventh	A. Seetha Rama Rao
2003	Nandini	R. S. Raju
2001	Little Hearts	Ravuri Venkateswar
1978	Ganga Bhavani	Children's Film Society, India
