= Kamakshi Bhaskarla =

Indian actress and model (born 1995)

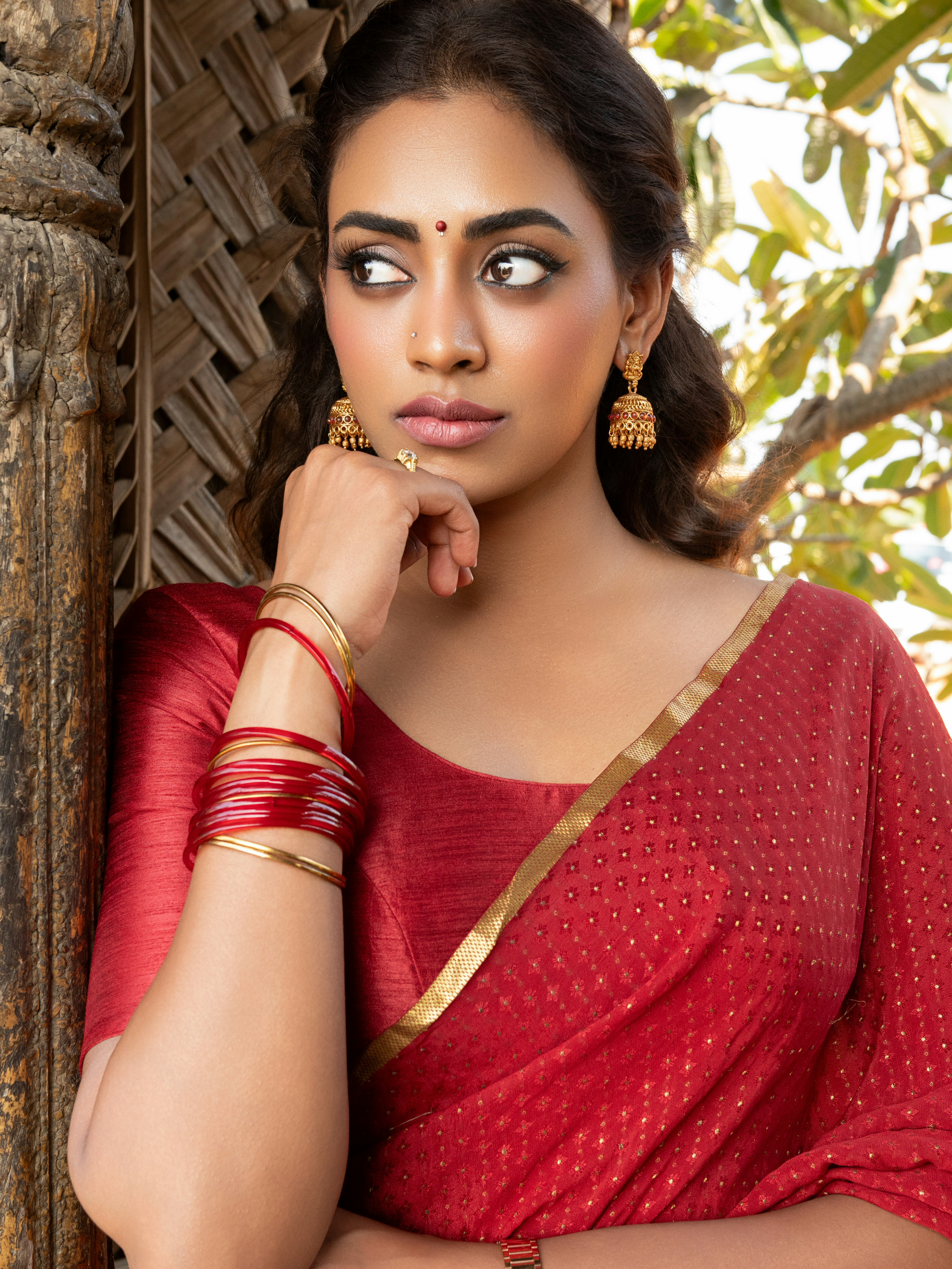
- Kamakshi in 2024
- Born: Sai Kamakshi Bhaskarla; 18 June 1995 (age 31); Eluru, Andhra Pradesh, India
- Education: MBBS
- Occupations: Actress; model; doctor
- Years active: 2021–present

Kamakshi Bhaskarla (born 18 June 1995) is an Indian actress and model who works in Telugu films. She won the title of Femina Miss India Telangana 2018. Kamakshi made her film debut in 2021 with Priyuraalu and got recognition through Maa Oori Polimera.

== Early life ==
Kamakshi was born on 18 June 1995 in Eluru, Andhra Pradesh, India. She completed her MBBS in China, and worked at Apollo Hospitals. Later, she trained in acting at Samahaara, a theatre group in Hyderabad.

== Career ==
Bhaskarla began her career as a model, winning the title of Femina Miss India Telangana 2018. She then participated in the 2018 Miss India competition and reached the finals.

In 2021, Kamakshi made her acting debut with the film Priyuraalu, directed by G. V. Rama Raju. She gained recognition through Maa Oori Polimera and its sequel Maa Oori Polimera 2.

She then appeared in 12A Railway Colony alongside Allari Naresh, Show Time with Naveen Chandra, and Dacoit: A Love Story with Adivi Sesh. Her upcoming films include Maa Oori Polimera 3, which is currently filming.

== Filmography ==
Key
†	Denotes films that have not yet been released

=== Films ===
Year	Title	Role	Notes
2021	Priyuraalu	Sarita	
2021	Most Eligible Bachelor	Harsha's friend	
2021	Maa Oori Polimera	Lachimi	
2021	Itlu Maredumilli Prajaneekam	Pollamma	
2022	Rowdy Boys		
2023	Virupaksha	Venkata Chalapathy's wife	
2023	Maa Oori Polimera 2	Lachimi	
2024	Mix Up	Ritu	
2024	Om Bheem Bush	Neha Sharma	
2025	Laila	Sundari	
2025	Show Time	Shanthi	
2025	12A Railway Colony	Aaradhana	
2026	Mension House Mallesh	Padma	
2026	Dacoit: A Love Story	Malli	Telugu-Hindi bilingual film
2026	Agadha	Mahadevi	
2027	Maa Oori Polimera 3 †	Lachimi	Filming

=== Television ===
Year	Title	Role	Network	Ref.
2021	The Baker and the Beauty	Smrithi	Aha	
2022	Anya’s Tutorial	Nikitha	Aha	
2022	Qubool Hai?	Anusha	Aha	
2022	Jhansi	Naaziya	Disney+ Hotstar	
2023	Shaitan	Kalavati	Disney+ Hotstar	
2023	Dhootha	Kala	Amazon Prime Video	
