= Rewind (2024 film) =

2024 Indian Telugu-language film by Kalyan Chakravarthy

- Theatrical release poster
- Directed by: Kalyan Chakravarthy
- Written by: Kalyan Chakravarthy
- Produced by: Kalyan Chakravarthy
- Starring: Sai Ronak; Amrutha Chowdary
- Cinematography: Shivaram Charan
- Edited by: Thushara Pala
- Music by: Ashirvad Luke
- Production company: Krosswire Kreations
- Release date: 18 October 2024
- Running time: 110 minutes
- Country: India
- Language: Telugu

Rewind is a 2024 Indian Telugu-language science fiction film thriller film written, directed and produced by Kalyan Chakravarthy. The film features Sai Ronak and Amrutha Chowdary in lead roles.

The film was released on 18 October 2024.

== Cast ==
- Sai Ronak as Karthik
- Amrutha Chowdary as Shanti
- Suresh as Karthik's father
- Samrat Reddy
- Viva Raghav
- Abhishek Viswakarma
- Jabardast Nagi
- Ramu Gandham
- Rajesh Vulli
- Funbucket Bharath
- Neelima Pathakamsetti

== Music ==
The film's music is composed by Ashirvad Luke

All music is composed by Ashirvad Luke.

No.	Title	Lyrics	Singer(s)	Length
1.	"Software Vaddura Mama"	Ravi Varma Akula	Ashique Ali	3:37
2.	"Love At First Sight"	Rakendu Mouli	Karthik	3:07
3.	"Love You Nanna"	Ravi Varma Akula	Javed Ali	3:33

== Release ==
Rewind was released on 18 October 2024.

=== Streaming rights ===
This movie was later released on Lionsgate Play and Amazon Prime Video on 7 March 2025, which is said to be the first Telugu movie to stream on Lionsgate Play making their Telugu debut.

== Reception ==
Deccan Chronicle gave a positive review saying that "Rewind is an interesting time travel movie. It is an engaging film that makes you want to watch it from start to end without missing a single scene". News18 Telugu gave a rating of 3 out of 5 and praised the screenplay. NTV rated the film 2.75 out of 5.
