= Nandi Award for Best Child Actor =

Indian film award

The Nandi Award for Best Child Actor is given by the Andhra Pradesh state government as part of its annual Nandi Awards for Telugu films since 1981. This is a list of the award recipients in this category since 1981.

Year	Child Actor	Film
2016	Maikhel Gandhi	Supreme
2015	Master NTR	Daana Veera Soora Karna
2014	Gautham Krishna	1: Nenokkadine
2013	Vijaya Simha Reddy	Bhakta Siriyaala
2012	Deepak Saroj	Minugurulu
2011	Master Nikhil	100% Love
2010	Master Bharath	Bindaas
2009	Sai Krishna	Drona
2008	Master Bharath	Ready
2007	Roshan	O Chinnari Korika
2006	Raghava	Style
2005	Patsa Sunny	Aasala Pallaki
2004	Sravan Nadella	Deeksha
2003	Ram Teja	Hero
2002	Kaushik Babu	Takkari Donga
2001	Master Mahendra	Little Hearts
2000	Master Sudhakar	Hindustan The Mother
1999	Master Mahendra	Devi
1998	Krishna Pradeep	Anthahpuram
1997	P. B. S. Aananda Vardhan	Priyaragalu
1996	Y.S.Adithya	Little Soldiers
1995	Master Uday	Rambantu
1994	Y.S.Adithya	Anna
1992	Tarun Kumar	Teja
1991	Master Santosh	Bhadram Koduko
1990	Tarun Kumar	Manasu Mamatha
1987	Master Shanmukha Srinivas	Sruthilayalu
1986	Master Sravan Kumar	Samsaram Oka Chadarangam
1984	Master Subrahmaniyam	Suvarna Sundari
1983	Harish Kumar	Andhra Kesari
1981	Ali	Seethakoka Chiluka
