= Mofussil =

2022 film by N.P. Sarathy

- Promotional poster with old title Nagarpuram
- Directed by: N. P. Sarathy
- Produced by: D. Arumugam
- Starring: Akhil; Sri Divya
- Cinematography: A. Jeyanand
- Edited by: Kottieshwaran Suresh
- Music by: Mikkin Aruldev
- Production company: G. D. Films
- Release date: 12 December 2022
- Country: India
- Language: Tamil

Mofussil (transl. Rural district) is a 2022 Indian Tamil-language romantic drama film directed by N. P. Sarathy and starring Akhil and Sri Divya. Having begun production in 2010, the film was released after a twelve-year delay via YouTube.

== Plot ==
The film is about two brothers in a middle-class family.

== Cast ==
- Akhil as Surya
- Sri Divya as Priya
- Pandi as Azhagu
- Manobala as Police officer
- Yogi Babu as Surya's friend
- R. N. R. Manohar as Police Inspector
- Meera Krishnan as Surya's mother
- Raviraj as Company MD

== Production ==
The film began production in 2010 under the title Nagarpuram and was supposed to mark Sri Divya's Tamil debut. In 2014, the producers of the film complained to Nadigar Sangam that Sri Divya was "refusing to extend her cooperation [to help release the film] stating that her star status has risen considerably".

== Soundtrack ==
The music was composed by Aruldev. The lyrics were written by Yugabharathi, Na. Muthukumar and Jaya Murasu. This was the second film Aruldev worked on after Potta Potti (2011). Initially, Hariharan sang for "Mazhaiye Mazhaiye" (based on Lobo's "I'd Love You to Want Me"), but after the music director was dissatisfied with the voice's connection with the visuals, he was replaced by Aalap Raju. In a music review of the film, a writer from The Times of India rated the soundtrack three out of five stars and wrote that "Music composer Arul Dev has learnt the ropes of music composition from Vidyasagar. This probably explains why all the songs in his Nagarpuram, irrespective of the mood it tries to establish, are high on melody".

No.	Title	Singer(s)	Length
1.	"Nagarpuram"	Arul Dev
2.	"Mazhaiye Mazhaiye"	Aalap Raju, Sam P. Keertham
3.	"Rupthereka (Whistle Pottu)"	Ranjith, K. Rani
4.	"Antha Devathayin (Machan)"	Bella Raj
5.	"Engeyum Neeye (Kokkipodu)"	Tippu, Vinitha
6.	"Veyile Veyile (Siru Siru)"	Karthik, Malathi

== Release ==
The film remained unreleased until the film was released directly via YouTube in 2022.
