= Nagendra Kumar Mothukuri =

Indian Cinematographer

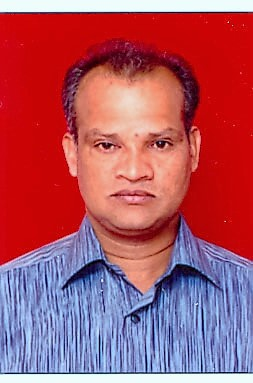
Nagendra Kumar Mothukuri

Nagendra Kumar Mothukuri is an Indian Cinematographer and Film Director working predominantly in Telugu cinema. His notable movies as a Cinematographer include Edurinti Mogudu Pakkinti Pellam, Ibbara Naduve Muddina Aata, Raja, Geluvina Saradara and Brahmachari Mogudu. As a director he is known for Suhasini starrer Ullamellam Thalladuthey, and Naa Girlfriend Baaga Rich.

As a cinematographer he has worked for more than 149 Feature films, and 86 Telefilms across many Indian languages including Telugu, Hindi, Bengali, Kannada, Bihari, Marathi, Urdu and Odia.

== Career ==
=== As a Cinematographer ===
Nagendra Kumar made his debut as a director of photography with the movie Srivari Chindulu. He worked as a director of photography more than 145 films including the movie Eluka Majaka.
He also worked for more than 86 telefilms and television serials including Telugu television puppet show Panchatantram on ETV.

=== As a Film Director ===
In the year 2006, Nagendra Kumar made his directorial debut with the Telugu movie Tanu starring Suhasini, Archana and Sivaji Raja. He also directed Sivaji Kaveri Jha starrer Naa Girlfriend Baaga Rich and remade his debut film in Tamil as Ullamellam Thalladuthey.

== Filmography ==
=== Director ===
1. Ullamellam Thalladuthey
2. Naa Girl Friend Baaga Rich
3. Tanu

=== Cinematographer ===
1. Eluka Majaka
2. Ullamellam Thalladuthey
3. Naa Girl Friend Baaga Rich
4. Half Fry
5. Aadab Hyderabad
6. Tanu
7. Back Pocket
8. Aadab Hyderabad
9. Lagna Patrika
10. Pichodi Chetilo Rayi
11. Samakka Sarakka
12. Ulta Palta
13. Chinni Chinni Aasa
14. Naagashakthi
15. High-class Aththa Low-class Allullu
16. Raja
17. Geluvina Saradara
18. Ibbara Naduve Muddina Aata
19. Sundara Vadana Subbalakshmi Moguda
20. Ketu Duplicatu
21. Parugo Parugu
22. Brahmachari Mogudu
23. Idandi Mavaari Varasa
24. Akka Pethanam Chellela Kaapuram
25. Mama Kodalu
26. Chillara Mogudu Allari Koduku
27. Pellam Chaatu Mogudu
28. Samsaraala Mechanic
29. Edurinti Mogudu Pakkinti Pellam
30. Sri Vaari Chindulu
