= Sri Divya =

Indian actress

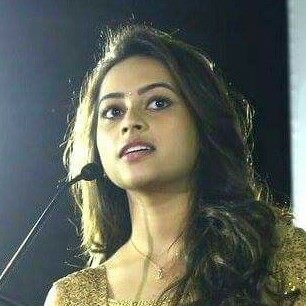
- Sri Divya in 2015
- Born: 1 April 1993 (age 33); Hyderabad, Andhra Pradesh (now in Telangana), India
- Occupation: Actress
- Years active: 1997-present
- Relatives: Sri Ramya (sister)

Sri Divya (born 1 April 1993) is an Indian actress who works primarily in Tamil and Telugu films. Divya is best known for her role in Bharati (2006), Mallela Theeram Lo Sirimalle Puvvu (2013), Varuthapadatha Valibar Sangam (2013), Jeeva (2014), Kaaki Sattai (2015), Jana Gana Mana (2022) and Meiyazhagan (2024).

== Early life ==
Sri Divya was born in Hyderabad of present-day Telangana on 1 April 1993. Divya has an elder sister, Sri Ramya who also acts in Telugu and Tamil films. Sri Divya studied in the Kendriya Vidyalaya.

== Career ==
Sri Divya started her career at the age of three. She played the lead in the children's film Bharati (2006). She has also acted in Telugu television serials.

She made her debut as a heroine in the 2010 Telugu romance film Manasara, directed by Ravi Babu, but the film was a failure. Then she featured in the film Bus Stop (2012) directed by Maruthi, co-starring Prince, which was successful at the box office. It was followed by Mallela Theeram Lo Sirimalle Puvvu in which she played a lonely wife who falls in love with a writer. About her performance, The Hindu wrote, "she looks very charming; the cotton saris bring out the grace in her". Idlebrain.com wrote, "Sri Divya epitomizes the character of an idealistic and independent woman. She did well and deserves applause".

She shot for her first Tamil film Nagarpuram in 2011, but the delay of the film meant that her Tamil debut was Varuthapadatha Valibar Sangam opposite Sivakarthikeyan, which was directed by Ponram. Sri Divya received very positive reviews from critics for her performance. Baradwaj Rangan wrote, "The actress is good. She knows the language, knows how to work a reaction shot, and she looks like she belongs in this milieu. It will be interesting to see what Tamil cinema makes of her". The Times of India wrote, "But the real surprise is debutant Sri Divya, who, is expressive, and can lip-sync very well, which isn't the case with most of our heroines today". The New Indian Express wrote, "As Latha, debutant Sridivya emotes well, infusing the character with innocence, charm and naughtiness".

In 2014 she appeared in two Tamil films, Suseenthiran's Jeeva and Vellaikaara Durai. She starred in several films in 2015 and 2016. After 2017, she made a brief hiatus and returned in 2022 with Jana Gana Mana, which marked her Malayalam debut.

== Filmography ==
Key
†	Denotes films that have not yet been released

Year	Film	Role	Language	Notes	Ref.
2000	Hanuman Junction	Young Devi	Telugu	Child artist	
2000	Yuvaraju	Kalpana	Telugu	Child artist	
2003	Veede	Scared girl in Kamadhenu Silks	Telugu	Child artist	
2006	Bharati	Bharati	Telugu	Child artist	
2010	Manasara	Anjali / Radha	Telugu	Debut as lead role	
2012	Bus Stop	Sailaja	Telugu		
2013	Mallela Theeram Lo Sirimalle Puvvu	Lakshmi	Telugu		
2013	Varuthapadatha Valibar Sangam	Latha Pandi	Tamil		
2014	Jeeva	Jenny	Tamil		
2014	Vellaikaara Durai	Yamuna	Tamil		
2015	Kaaki Sattai	Divya	Tamil		
2015	Varadhi	Aradhana	Telugu		
2015	Kerintha	Manaswini	Telugu		
2015	Size Zero	Herself	Telugu	Cameo appearance	
2015	Inji Iduppazhagi	Herself	Tamil	Cameo appearance	
2015	Eetti	Gayathri Venugopal	Tamil		
2016	Bangalore Naatkal	Divya Raghavan	Tamil		
2016	Pencil	Maya	Tamil		
2016	Marudhu	Bhagyalakshmi	Tamil		
2016	Remo	Divya	Tamil	Cameo appearance	
2016	Kaashmora	Yamini	Tamil		
2016	Maaveeran Kittu	Gomathi	Tamil		
2017	Sangili Bungili Kadhava Thorae	Swetha	Tamil		
2022	Jana Gana Mana	Padma	Malayalam		
2022	Mofussil	Priya	Tamil	Delayed film; released on YouTube	
2023	Raid	Venba	Tamil		
2024	Meiyazhagan	Nandhini	Tamil		

=== Television ===
Year	Show	Role	Language	Network	Ref.
1997–2000	Ruthuragalu		Telugu	DD Saptagiri	
2007	Sravana Meghaalu	Meghana	Telugu	ETV	
2008–2011	Thoorpu Velle Railu	Radha	Telugu	ETV	

== Awards ==
- 2006: Nandi Award for Best Child Actress for Bharati.
- 2014: SIIMA Award for Best Female Debut – Tamil for Varuthapadatha Valibar Sangam.
