= Bhadram Koduko =

- Directed by: Akkineni Kutumba Rao
- Written by: Popuri Lalitha Kumari (Volga)
- Produced by: V. Ramachandra Rao
- Starring: Santhosh Reddy; Laya
- Music by: Prof.Yella Venkateshwara Rao
- Distributed by: Swecha Creations
- Release date: 1992
- Country: India
- Language: Telugu

Bhadram Koduko (transl. "Be Careful, My Son !") is a 1992 Telugu film directed by Akkineni Kutumba Rao. Santhosh Reddy played the lead role. Laya was starring in the cast. The story is based on the various problems faced by the street children and the issue of child labour in India, particularly in urban areas. The film won two Nandhi State Film Awards and two National Film Awards.

== Awards ==
Nandi Awards

- Best Children's Film - Gold - V. Ramachandra Rao & Akkineni Kutumba Rao
- Best Child Actor - Master Santosh Reddy

National Film Awards

- Best Child Artist - Santosh Reddy
- Best Feature Film in Telugu - V. Ramachandra Rao & Akkineni Kutumba Rao
