= Niharika Konidela =

Indian actress, producer (born 1993)

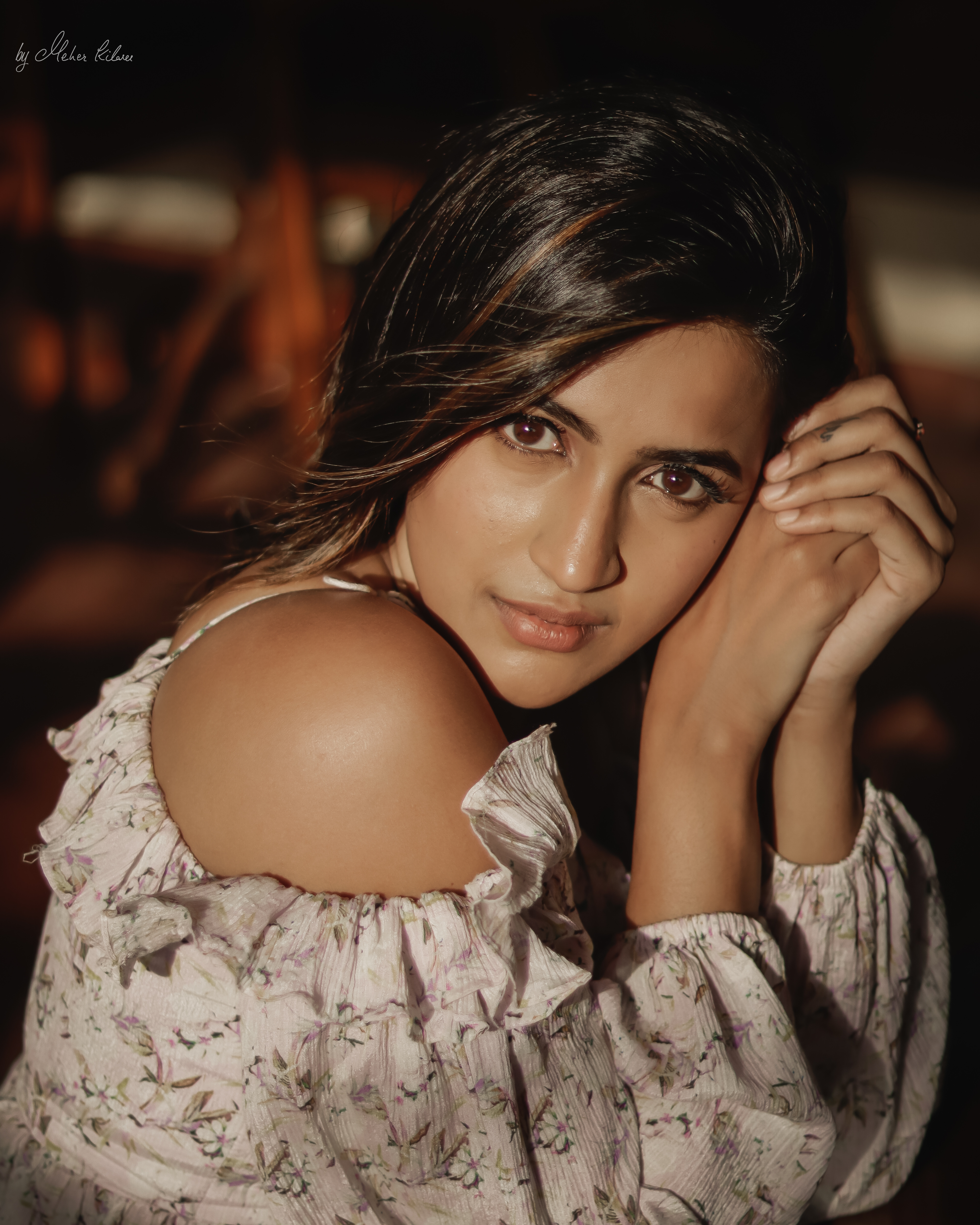
- Niharika in 2022
- Born: 18 December 1993 (age 32); Hyderabad, Andhra Pradesh, India (now in Telangana, India)
- Education: St. Mary's College, Hyderabad
- Occupations: Actress; producer
- Years active: 2015–present
- Spouse: Chaitanya Jonnalagadda (m. 2020; div. 2023)
- Parents: Nagendra Babu (father); Padmaja Konidela (mother)
- Relatives: Varun Tej (brother); Lavanya Tripathi Konidela (sister-in-law); Pawan Kalyan (Uncle)
- Family: See Konidela–Allu family

Niharika Konidela (born 18 December 1993) is an Indian actress and producer who works in Telugu films. She made her debut with the film Oka Manasu (2016). She produces films and web series under her banner Pink Elephant Pictures.

== Early and personal life ==
Niharika Konidela is the daughter of actor and producer Nagendra Babu and Padmaja Konidela. She is the niece of actors Chiranjeevi and Pawan Kalyan. Her brother, Varun Tej, and cousins, Ram Charan, Sai Dharam Tej, Vaisshnav Tej, and Allu Arjun are also actors in Telugu cinema.

Niharika did her schooling at The Future kids School, Hyderabad and completed her graduation from St. Mary's College, Hyderabad. She married Chaitanya Jonnalagadda on 9 December 2020, at Oberoi Udaivilas in Udaipur, Rajasthan. The couple announced their divorce on 5 July 2023.

== Career ==
Niharika worked as a presenter on Telugu language television before pursuing a career as an actress. She has hosted Dhee Ultimate Dance Show for the segments Dhee Junior 1 and Dhee Junior 2 aired on ETV Network.

She acted and also produced the Telugu web-series Muddapappu Avakai under her banner Pink Elephant Pictures. This series was released on YouTube and was well received by the audience. In September 2015, she signed Oka Manasu which marked her debut as a film actress. Her 2019 film, Suryakantham, performed poorly at the box office, grossing ₹3 crore. Later that year, she played a minor role in the historical action film Sye Raa Narasimha Reddy.

=== Pink Elephant Pictures ===
In 2015, Konidela launched her film production company, Pink Elephant Pictures.

== Filmography ==
Key
†	Denotes films that have not yet been released

=== Film ===
Year	Title	Role(s)	Language	Notes	Ref.
2016	Oka Manasu	Sandhya	Telugu		
2018	Oru Nalla Naal Paathu Solren	Sowmya / Alakshmi	Tamil		
2018	Happy Wedding	Akshara	Telugu		
2019	Suryakantham	Suryakantham	Telugu		
2019	Sye Raa Narasimha Reddy	Bhagyam	Telugu	Cameo appearance	
2024	Darling	Priya's friend	Telugu	Cameo appearance	
2024	Committee Kurrollu	–	Telugu	Producer; Cameo appearance in the song "Ennikalu"	
2025	Madraskaaran	Meera	Tamil		
2026	Raakaasa	–	Telugu	Producer; Cameo appearance in a song	

=== Television ===
Year	Title	Role	Network	Notes	Ref.
2015	Dhee Junior	Herself (Host)	ETV		
2016	Muddapappu Avakai	Aasha	ZEE5	Also producer	
2018	Nanna Koochi	Tara	ZEE5	Also producer	
2019	MadHouse	Meena	YouTube	Also producer	
2021	Oka Chinna Family Story	–	ZEE5	Producer only	
2022	Hello World	–	ZEE5	Producer only	
2023	Dead Pixels	Gayathri	Disney+ Hotstar		
2024	Bench Life	Pooja	SonyLIV	Cameo appearance; Also producer	
2026	Aata	Herself (Judge). Also producer	Zee Telugu		
