= Akkineni Kutumba Rao =

Indian filmmaker in Tollywood

- Born: Hyderabad, Andhra Pradesh, India
- Occupations: Film director, producer and writer

Akkineni Kutumba Rao is an Indian filmmaker known for his work in Telugu parallel cinema, and documentary films. He won three International awards, two Nandi Awards and one National Film Award.

== Filmography ==
=== Film ===
All films listed here are in Telugu unless otherwise specified.

- Bhadram Koduko (1992) – director – Nandi Award for Best Children Film
- Thodu (1997) – writer, director
- Patha Nagaramlo Pasivadu (1999) – producer – Nandi Award for Best Children Film
- Gulabeelu (2005)
- Amulyam (2007) – director – Nandi Award for Best Children Film

=== Television ===
- Manayi - Hindi

== Books ==
- Sorajjem (tr. freedom/proper name for a female)
  - Sorajjem, translated into English by Alladi Uma and M. Sridhar (Orient BlackSwan, 2016) ISBN 9788125062936
- Venuganam(tr. song of a flute)
- Mohanaragam (tr. Mohan's attachment / a ragam in music by name Mohana)
- Karmika Geetam (tr. song of workers)
- Chedupaata (tr. bitter song)
- Amma (tr. mother)
- Athojagat Sahodari (tr. the sister from the lowly world)
- Kolleti Jadalu (tr. traces of Kolleru lake) (2014)
  - Softly Dies a Lake, translated into English by Vasanth Kannabiran (Orient BlackSwan, 2020) ISBN 9789390122585
- Toli Adugulu (tr. beginning steps)
- Bhadram Koduko (tr. Oh son, Bhadram)
- Pasivaditanam (tr. childishness of a child)
- Pattanamlo batukudamani (tr. for the sake of living in a town)

== Awards ==
National Film Awards

- National Film Award for Best Feature Film in Telugu - Bhadram Koduko

Nandi Awards

- Best Children's Film - Bhadram Koduko (1991)
- Best Children's Film - Patha Nagaramlo Paivadu (1999)

== International honours ==
- Certificate of Merit at Cairo International Film Festival - Pathanagaramlo Pasivadu
- 14th Golden Elephant Film Festival in 2005 - Special Mention - Gulabeelu
- Festival of Regional Cinema, 2003 - Seychelles - Best Story - Thodu
