= ZEE5 =

Indian video on demand service

Zee 5
- Logo used since 2025
- Company type: Subsidiary
- Website type: OTT platform
- Available in: Bengali; Bhojpuri; English; Gujarati; Hindi; Kannada; Malayalam; Marathi; Odia; Punjabi; Tamil; Telugu
- Headquarters: Mumbai, Maharashtra, India
- Area served: 190+ countries
- Owner: Zee Entertainment Enterprises
- Industry: Entertainment, mass media
- Products: Video on demand; Digital distribution
- Services: Film production; Film distribution; Television production
- Website: www.zee5.com
- Commercial: Yes
- Registration: Optional
- Users: 119.5 million monthly (As of December 2022)
- Launched: 14 February 2018; 8 years ago (India); 22 June 2021; 5 years ago (USA)
- Current status: Active

Zee 5 or Z5 is an Indian subscription video on-demand over-the-top streaming television service owned by Zee Entertainment Enterprises. It was launched in India on 14 February 2018 with content in 12 languages. The Zee 5 app is available on Android and iOS. In December 2018, Zee 5 had 56.3 million monthly active users, increasing to 65.9 million by the end of 2020.

== History ==
Ozee was an Indian digital online platform that was launched in February 2016 by Zee Entertainment Enterprises. It was integrated into Zee 5 in February 2018.

== Programming ==
The service started streaming web series in 2018 with Nanna Koochi (Telugu), America Mappillai (Tamil) and Dhatt Tere Ki (Hindi), followed in the same year by Kallachirippu, produced by popular filmmaker Karthik Subbaraj, Karenjit Kaur – The Untold Story of Sunny Leone, and Life Sahi Hai.

In July 2019, Zee 5 and ALTBalaji announced that ZEE5 subscribers would get seamless access to ALTBalaji's originals in addition to existing Zee 5 content. ZEE5 made an exclusive deal with The Blunt for five web series, starting with Faltu Engineers.

=== Sports ===
In January 2023, Zee 5 became the official streaming partner for International League T20 cricket, marking the service's entry into major sports streaming. In 2024, Zee 5 added football to its sports catalogue by streaming Calcutta Football League matches.

In June 2026, Zee 5 secured the rights to stream all major FIFA tournaments in India from 2026 to 2034. This includes the 2026, 2030, and 2034 FIFA World Cups.

== HiPi ==
HiPi is a video sharing social platform for Indian audiences, available free on the Zee 5 app, where users can record and upload their own videos and can also view and engage with the videos shared by other people.

== Availability ==
The service was launched in the United States on 22 June 2021; Zee 5's Archana Anand and actress Priyanka Chopra Jonas attended.

=== Mobile app ===
The service offers a mobile app on three platforms, and it has partnered with Applicaster, Lotame, Talamoos and A.I. video enhancement startup Minute.ly to provide enhanced UI/UX and improved application performance.

== See also ==
- SonyLIV
- Crunchyroll
- Wakanim
- Anime on Demand
- Funimation
- VRV
