= Pawan Kalyan filmography =

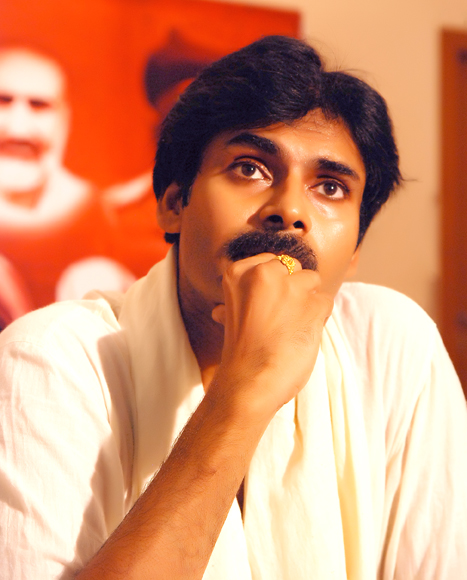
- Film: 31

Pawan Kalyan is an Indian actor, martial artist, stunt coordinator, playback singer, choreographer, film director, screenwriter, film producer, narrator, philanthropist and politician working in Telugu cinema.

Pawan Kalyan made his acting debut in the 1996 film Akkada Ammayi Ikkada Abbayi. His next six films were all box-office successes — Gokulamlo Seeta (1997), Suswagatham (1998), Tholi Prema (1998), Thammudu (1999), Puri Jagannadh's Badri (2000), and S. J. Suryah's Kushi (2001) .

Kalyan made his directorial debut with Johnny (2003), which was a box office failure. He followed this with a string of underperforming films: Gudumba Shankar (2004), Balu (2005), Bangaram (2006), and Annavaram (2006). After a gap, the film Jalsa (2008) directed by Trivikram Srinivas became a box office success. He collaborated with Suryah again for Puli (2010), which was a box office debacle. Teen Maar (2010) and Panjaa (2011) were released to mixed reviews.

The film Gabbar Singh (2012) was released to positive reviews and was a blockbuster at the box office, marking his comeback after three back-to -back failures. Kalyan's second film with Puri Jagannadh was Cameraman Gangatho Rambabu (2012), which was released to above average reviews. Trivikram Srinivas's Attarintiki Daredi (2013) became the highest grossing Telugu film of all time surpassing Magadheera (2009).

Gopala Gopala (2015) co-starring Venkatesh was a success while Sardaar Gabbar Singh, Katamarayudu, and Agnyaathavaasi received negative reviews. Vakeel Saab (2021), the masala-laced adaptation of the courtroom drama Pink (2016), received positive reviews. His next film, Bheemla Nayak (2022), was successful and ended up becoming the fourth highest-grossing Telugu film of 2022.

== Film ==
Key
| † | Denotes films that have not yet been released |

| Year | Title | Role | Notes | Ref. |
|---|---|---|---|---|
| 1996 | Akkada Ammayi Ikkada Abbayi | Kalyan | credited as Kalyan Babu | |
| 1997 | Gokulamlo Seeta | Pawan Kalyan | | |
| 1998 | Suswagatham | Ganesh | | |
| 1998 | Tholi Prema | Balu | | |
| 1999 | Thammudu | Subramanyam "Subhash/Subbu" | | |
| 2000 | Badri | Badrinath "Badri" | | |
| 2001 | Kushi | Siddhartha "Siddhu" Roy | | |
| 2003 | Johnny | Johnny | | |
| 2004 | Gudumba Shankar | Gudumba Shankar / Kalyan (Note: Pawan Kalyan played a single character with two or more names.) | | |
| 2004 | Shankar Dada M.B.B.S. | Gudumba Shankar | Cameo appearance | |
| 2005 | Balu | Balu / Ghani | | |
| 2006 | Bangaram | Bangaram | | |
| 2006 | Annavaram | Annavaram / Pothu Raju | | |
| 2007 | Shankar Dada Zindabad | Suresh | Cameo appearance | |
| 2008 | Jalsa | Sanjay "Sanju" Saahu | | |
| 2010 | Puli | Komaram Puli | | |
| 2011 | Teen Maar | Arjun Palwai and Michael Velayudham (Note: Pawan Kalyan played dual role) | Dual role | |
| 2011 | Panjaa | Jai | | |
| 2012 | Gabbar Singh | CI Venkataratnam Naidu / Gabbar Singh | | |
| 2012 | Cameraman Gangatho Rambabu | Ram Prakash “Rambabu” | | |
| 2013 | Attarintiki Daredi | Gowtham Nanda / Siddhu | | |
| 2015 | Gopala Gopala | Lord Krishna | | |
| 2016 | Sardaar Gabbar Singh | Sardaar Gabbar Singh | | |
| 2017 | Katamarayudu | Katamarayudu | | |
| 2018 | Agnyaathavaasi | Abhishiktha Bhargav / Balasubramanyam | | |
| 2021 | Vakeel Saab | Adv. Konidela Sathyadev | | |
| 2022 | Bheemla Nayak | SI Sarhad Bheemla Nayak | | |
| 2023 | Bro | God of Time "Titan" | | |
| 2025 | Hari Hara Veera Mallu | Veera Mallu | | |
| 2025 | They Call Him OG | Ojas Gambheera / Master Orochi Genshin "OG" | | |
| 2026 | Ustaad Bhagat Singh | Ustaad Bhagat Singh IPS | | |

== Other crew positions ==
| Year | Film | Notes |
|---|---|---|
| 2003 | Johnny | Director, Writer |
| 2004 | Gudumba Shankar | Screenplay |
| 2016 | Sardaar Gabbar Singh | Story, Producer |
| 2018 | Chal Mohan Ranga | Producer |

== Stunt coordinator ==
| Year | Film | Ref. |
|---|---|---|
| 1999 | Thammudu | |
| 2000 | Badri | |
| 2001 | Kushi | |
| 2001 | Daddy | |
| 2004 | Gudumba Shankar | |
| 2016 | Sardaar Gabbar Singh | |
| 2018 | Agnyaathavaasi | |
| 2025 | Hari Hara Veera Mallu | |

== Narrator ==
| Year | Film |
|---|---|
| 2019 | Sye Raa Narasimha Reddy |

== Choreographer/Songs Visualizer ==
| Year | Film | Song | Ref. |
|---|---|---|---|
| 2001 | Kushi | All songs except "Ammaye Sannaga" and "Gajja Gallu" | |
| 2004 | Gudumba Shankar | All songs | |
| 2011 | Panjaa | Panjaa (Title Song) | |

== Discography ==
| Year | Film | Songs | Composer | Notes |
|---|---|---|---|---|
| 1999 | Thammudu | "Thati Chettu" and "Em Pilla Maatadava" | Ramana Gogula | Bit songs |
| 2001 | Kushi | "Bye Byee Bangaru Ramanamma" | Mani Sharma | Bit songs |
| 2003 | Johnny | "Nuvvu Sara Taguta" and "Ravoyi Maa Country Ki" | Ramana Gogula | Bit songs |
| 2004 | Gudumba Shankar | "Killi Killi" | Mani Sharma | Starting portions |
| 2011 | Panjaa | "Paparaayudu" | Yuvan Shankar Raja | |
| 2013 | Attarintiki Daredi | "Kaatama Rayudaa, Kadiri Narasimhudaa" | Devi Sri Prasad | |
| 2018 | Agnyaathavaasi | "Kodakaa Koteswar Rao" | Anirudh Ravichander | |
| 2025 | Hari Hara Veera Mallu | "Maata Vinali" | M. M. Keeravani | |
| 2025 | Hari Hara Veera Mallu | "Baat Nirali" | M. M. Keeravani | Hindi dubbed version |
| 2025 | Hari Hara Veera Mallu | "Kekkanum Guruve" | M. M. Keeravani | Tamil dubbed version |
| 2025 | Hari Hara Veera Mallu | "Kelkkanam Guruve" | M. M. Keeravani | Malayalam dubbed version |
| 2025 | Hari Hara Veera Mallu | "Maathu Kelayya" | M. M. Keeravani | Kannada dubbed version |
| 2025 | They Call Him OG | "Washi Yo Washi" | Thaman S | |
| 2025 | They Call Him OG | "Washi Yo Washi" | Thaman S | Hindi dubbed version |

== See also ==
- List of Indian actors
- Telugu cinema
