= Sunitha Upadrashta =

Indian playback singer

Sunitha
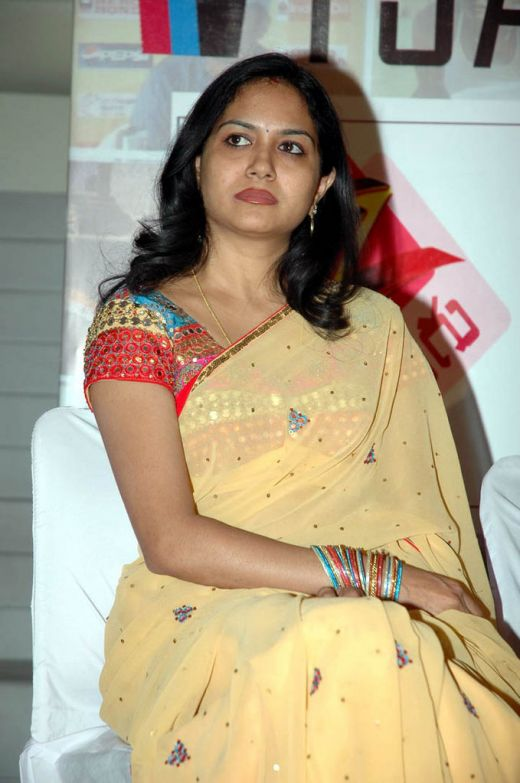
- Born: Sunitha Upadrashta; 10 May 1978 (age 48); Guntur, Andhra Pradesh, India
- Occupation: Singer
- Years active: 1995–present
- Spouse: Rama Krishna Veerapaneni 2021-present

Sunitha Upadrashta, known mononymously as Sunitha, is an Indian playback singer and dubbing artist who primarily works in Telugu cinema.

Sunitha made her playback singing debut in 1995 with the film Gulabi, and as a dubbing artist she has lent her voice to over 110 actresses in more than 750 films. She is recognised as an anchor and host for music-based and flagship programmes, including the foundation-laying ceremony of Amaravati in 2015. She has also been a judge on music reality shows on several television channels, notably Padutha Theeyaga, the long-running programme on ETV launched and hosted by S. P. Balasubrahmanyam.

Sunitha has performed as a singer in 19 countries, including the United States (almost annually since 1999), the United Kingdom, the United Arab Emirates, Singapore, Malaysia, Uganda, Nigeria, Tanzania, South Africa, Australia, Scotland, Ireland, Sri Lanka, Thailand, Japan, Oman, Bahrain, Qatar, and Mauritius.

Sunitha is a recipient of nine Nandi Awards and two Filmfare Awards South in various categories. At the age of 15 she received a National Award from All India Radio in the light music category. She won her first Nandi Award in 1999, followed by consecutive awards from 2002 to 2006 and again from 2010 to 2012. In 2011 she was conferred the Lata Mangeshkar Best Singer Award by the Government of Andhra Pradesh.

== Early and personal life ==
Sunitha was born into a music-loving family on 10 May 1978 in Guntur, Andhra Pradesh. At the age of six she began training in Carnatic vocals under Pemmaraju Surya Rao and in light music under Kalaga Krishna Mohan. She had the opportunity to perform in concerts from a young age, including programmes featured by All India Radio. At the age of thirteen she participated in the Tyagaraja Aradhana Utsavalu along with her guru Pemmaraju Surya Rao, and later received a scholarship from the Government of India to pursue her musical training.

In 1997, at the age of nineteen, she married Kiran Kumar Goparaju, a media professional. They have two children, Akash and Shreya, but the couple later divorced. In January 2021 Sunitha married businessman Rama Krishna Veerapaneni in the presence of family members and close friends.

Following in her mother's footsteps, daughter Shreya made her playback singing debut with the song "Tick Tick Tick" in the Telugu film Savyasachi.

== Career ==
=== Playback singing ===
Sunitha began her playback singing career at the age of seventeen when music director Sashi Preetham gave her an opportunity to sing in the film Gulabi. Her first song was "Ee Vela Lo Neevu", written by Sirivennela Seetharama Sastry. In 1997 she sang a solo track for the Kannada film Bhoomi Geetha, composed by Ilayaraja, and also rendered title songs for Telugu television serials such as Ruturagalu and Antarangalu. In 1999, for the title song of Antarangalu, she received her first Nandi Award from the then undivided state of Andhra Pradesh.

Over the course of her career Sunitha has recorded nearly 3,000 songs in South Indian films, singing in Telugu, Tamil, and Kannada, and has collaborated with many music directors, including Ilayaraja, Vidyasagar, M.M. Keeravani, A.R Rahman, S.V. Krishna Reddy, Vandematharam Srinivas, Mani Sharma, Ramana Gogula, S.A. Raj Kumar, Sandeep Choutha, Mickey J. Mayer, Devisri Prasad, R.P. Patnaik, Chakri, Anup Rubens, Sunil Kashyap, Madhavapeddi Suresh, V. Harikrishna, Jassie Gift, S. Thaman, and others.

=== Dubbing artist ===
Sunitha began her career as a dubbing artist in 1998 with the film Choodalani Vundi, providing her voice for Soundarya, who co-starred with Chiranjeevi. She went on to become one of the leading dubbing artists in the Telugu film industry, voicing more than 110 actresses in over 750 films, and reportedly voicing as many as 60 films in a single year. Her 750th film as a dubbing artist was Gautamiputra Satakarni in 2017, in which she lent her voice to Shriya Saran.

== Discography ==
=== Playback and singing ===
==== Telugu ====
Sunitha's work as a playback singer in Telugu includes:

Year	Film	Song(s)	Music director(s)	Co-singer(s)
1995	Gulabi	"Ee Velalo Neevu"	Sashi Preetam	
1997	Egire Paavurama	"Maaghaa Maasam"	S.V. Krishna Reddy	
1997	Egire Paavurama	"Gunde Gutiki"	S.V. Krishna Reddy	
1998	Sri Sita Ramula Kalyanam Chootamu Raarandi	"Nee Oohallo"	M.M. Keeravani	
1998	Sri Sita Ramula Kalyanam Chootamu Raarandi	"Om Ani"	M.M. Keeravani	
1998	Sri Sita Ramula Kalyanam Chootamu Raarandi	"Raamayana Saaram"	M.M. Keeravani	
1998	Sri Sita Ramula Kalyanam Chootamu Raarandi	"Yevamma Computeramma"	M.M. Keeravani	
1998	Sri Sita Ramula Kalyanam Chootamu Raarandi	"O Prema"	M.M. Keeravani	S. P. Balasubrahmanyam
1998	Sri Sita Ramula Kalyanam Chootamu Raarandi	"Yevamma Vinavemamma"	M.M. Keeravani	
1998	Sri Sita Ramula Kalyanam Chootamu Raarandi	"Shuklam Baradharam"	M.M. Keeravani	
1999	Thammudu	"Pedhavi Datani"	Ramana Gogula	Ramana Gogula
2000	Badri	"Vevela Mainala Gaanam"	Ramana Gogula	
2000	Badri	"Bangalakathamlo"	Ramana Gogula	
2000	Badri	"Chali Pidugullo"	Ramana Gogula	
2000	Badri	"Hey Chikitha"	Ramana Gogula	
2000	Yuvaraju	"Manasemo"	Ramana Gogula	
2000	Yuvaraju	"Tholivalape Tiyyanidi"	Ramana Gogula	
2000	Yuvaraju	"Chandamama"	Ramana Gogula	
2000	Tirumala Tirupati Venkatesa	"Abbo Naa Bangaru Laddu"	Vandemataram Srinivas	Sukhwinder Singh, Swarnalatha
2001	Murari	"Alanati Ramachandruni"	Mani Sharma	Jikki, Sandhya
2001	Naa Manasistha Raa	"Punnami Jabilli"	S.A. Rajukumar	SP. Balu
2001	Naa Manasistha Raa	"Kadantaava Cheppu"	S.A. Rajukumar	
2001	Naa Manasistha Raa	"Twinkle Twinkle Twinkle"	S.A. Rajukumar	
2002	Aadi	"Nee Navvula"	Mani Sharma	Mallikarjun
2003	Vijayam	"Meghala Pallaki"	Koti	Tippu
2003	Nenu Pelliki Ready	"Nuvvunte Chalu"(Female)	Chakri	
2003	Nenu Pelliki Ready	"Mugguru Bhamala"	Chakri	
2003	Ela Cheppanu	"Meghala Pallakilona"	Koti	
2003	Ela Cheppanu	"Rangula Taaraka"	Koti	
2003	Ee Abbai Chala Manchodu	"Chandamama Kathalo"	M.M. Keeravani	Kalyani Malik
2003	Gangotri	"Ganga"	M.M. Keeravani	SPB. Charan
2003	Maa Alludu Very Good	"Paluke Bangaramayena"	M.M. Keeravani	
2003	Maa Alludu Very Good	"Padaka Padaka"	M.M. Keeravani	MM Keeravani
2003	Seethaiah	"Samayaniki"	M.M. Keeravani	
2003	Seethaiah	"Adhishankarula"	M.M. Keeravani	SPB.Charan
2003	Simhadri	"Nannedo Seyyamaku"	M.M. Keeravani	M.M. Keeravani
2003	2 Much	"Papa Nee Votu"	K. Veeru	
2003	2 Much	"Talentu Bayata Pettu"	K. Veeru	
2003	Anaganaga O Kurraadu	"Sakku Sakku"	Chakri	
2003	Appudappudu	"Nee Kalalu Kaavali"	R. P. Patnaik	
2004	Siva Puthrudu	"Chirugali Veechene"(Duet)	Ilayaraja	R.P. Patnaik
2004	Letha Manasulu	"Letha Manasulu"	M.M. Keeravani	
2004	Nenunnanu	"Nenunnanani"	M.M. Keeravani	M.M. Keeravani
2004	Nenunnanu	"Ryali Ravalapadu"	M.M. Keeravani	Tippu
2004	Pallakilo Pellikoothuru	"Naa Peru Cheppukondi"	M.M. Keeravani	
2004	Athade Oka Sainyam	"Naa Paata Teta Telugu"	S.V. Krishna Reddy	
2004	Athade Oka Sainyam	"Maa Intiki Ninnu Pilichi"	S.V. Krishna Reddy	
2004	Athade Oka Sainyam	"Hey Apparao"	S.V. Krishna Reddy	
2004	Swarabhishekam	"Kudikannu Adirene"	Vidya Sagar	SP. Balu
2004	Anji	"Maanava Maanava"	Mani Sharma	tippu
2004	Apparao Driving School	"Ninnu Chuse Velalone"	Ghantadi Krishna	
2005	Chatrapathi	"Gundusudi"	M.M. Keeravani	M.M. Keeravani
2005	Chatrapathi	"Summa Maasuriya"	M.M. Keeravani	
2005	Allari Bullodu	"Andhamante Evaridi"	M.M. Keeravani	SPB. Charan
2005	Athadu	"Avunu Nijam"	Mani Sharma	
2005	Radha Gopalam	"Maa Muddu Radhamma"	Mani Sharma	
2005	Radha Gopalam	"Nee Vaalu Jada"	Mani Sharma	sp Balasubramaniam
2005	That Is Pandu	"Vennelona Adapillanu"	Mani Sharma	
2005	Manasu Maata Vinadhu	"Nuvvu Nijam"	Kalyan Koduri	
2005	Alex	"O Meghamala"	Bunty	
2005	Allari Pidugu	"Maa Subbalachamma"	Mani Sharma	S. P. Balasubrahmanyam
2006	Shiva 2006	"Adaganidhe Cheppedi Yela"	Ilayaraja	Vijay Prakash
2006	Vikramarkudu	"Jum jum Maya"	M. M. Keeravani	m.m keeravani
2006	Godavari	"Andhanga Lena"	K.M. RadhaKrishnan	
2006	Sri Ramadasu	"Chalu Chalu'	M.M. Keeravani	sp.charan
2006	Sri Ramadasu	"Idigidigo Naa Ramudu"	M.M. Keeravani	
2006	Sri Ramadasu	"Nanubrovamani"	M.M. Keeravani	
2006	Sri Ramadasu	"Thandrimatanu"	M.M. Keeravani	
2006	Kokila	"Shubhamo Sukhamo"	Madhukar	
2006	Boss	"Yedho Thamasaga"	Kalyan Koduri	
2006	Boss	"Naa Kallu Valle"	Kalyan Koduri	
2006	Boss	"Andhagadu Muttukunte"	Kalyan Koduri	
2006	Boss	"Anaganaganaga"	Kalyan Koduri	
2006	Boss	"Veluthunna"	Kalyan Koduri	
2006	Chinnodu	"Hey Manasa"	Ramana Gogula	Venu
2006	Lakshmi	"Thara Thaluku Thara"	Ramana Gogula	
2007	Sangamam	"Chinuku Chinuku'	M.M. Keeravani	
2007	Yamadonga	"Noonugu Meesalodu"	M.M. Keeravani	M.M. Keeravani
2007	Gita	"Neekosam Nennunantu"	Sunil Kashyap	
2007	Yogi	"Nee Illu Bangaram"	Ramana Gogula	Ramana Gogula
2007	Viyyalavari Kayyalu	"Neelala Neekallu"	Ramana Gogula	Sri Krishna
2007	Aata	"Yela Yela"	Devi Sri Prasad	
2007	Bookailas	"Venu Madhava"	M. M. Keeravani	
2007	Chirutha	"Ivvale"	Mani Sharma	
2007	Godava	"Okkasaari"	Mani Sharma	
2007	Gundamma Gaari Manavadu	"Chengaavi Rangu Cheera"	Vandemataram Srinivas	
2007	Manchu Kurise Velalo	"Andhama Nee Vooredhamma"	Usha Kanna, Krishna Mohan	
2007	Manchu Kurise Velalo	"Choodalani Vundi"	Usha Kanna, Krishna Mohan	
2007	Nee Navve Chaalu	"Poola Pallaki"	Vandemataram Srinivas	
2007	O Chinnari korika	"Aataladukundam"	Nagendra Kumar Vepuri	
2007	Okkadunnadu	"Adugaduguna"	M. M. Keeravani	
2007	Veduka	"Mallela Mancham"	Anup Rubens	
2008	Pandurangadu	"Govindhude Kokachutti"	M. M. Keeravani	
2008	Pandurangadu	"Kosaladeshapu Kamalitho"	M. M. Keeravani	
2008	Kanthri	"Vayassunami"	Mani Sharma	Hema Chandra
2008	Rainbow	"Aasha Chinni Aasha"	Nihal	
2008	Rainbow	"Manasa Chalinchake"	Nihal	
2008	Rainbow	"Challu Challu"	Nihal	
2008	Rainbow	"Naa Kallalo"	Nihal	
2008	Rainbow	"O Lalana"	Nihal	
2008	Rainbow	"Sala Sala"	Nihal	
2008	Rainbow	"Swamy Raa"(Thillana)	Nihal	
2008	Aalayam	"Neetho Vasthunna"	Koti	
2008	Bhuma	"Abba Yem Kandaluro"	Vandemataram Srinivas	
2009	Nachav Alludu	"Enthentha Dhooram"	Koti	Hema Chandra
2009	Vengamamba	"Alaka Nabambhu Chalada"	M. M. Keeravani	
2009	Vengamamba	"Harinama"(Kruthi)	M. M. Keeravani	
2009	Vengamamba	"Hari Alasiti"	M. M. Keeravani	
2009	Vengamamba	"O Thalli Ganga"	M. M. Keeravani	
2009	Vengamamba	"Srikaramuganu"	M. M. Keeravani	
2009	Vengamamba	"Sri Rukminilola"	M. M. Keeravani	
2009	Vengamamba	"Thirukonda Harathi"	M. M. Keeravani	
2009	Boni	"Nammaleni Kale Nijamayena"	Ramana Gogula	Deepu
2009	Saarai Veerraju	"Needho Naadho"	V. Sri Sai	Karthik
2009	Saarai Veerraju	"Veeche Gaali"	V. Sri Sai	
2009	Aa Intlo	"Hrudayavedhana"	Koti	
2010	Jhummandi Naadam	"Entha Entha"	M. M. Keeravani	
2010	Jhummandi Naadam	"Sannayi Mogindhi"	M. M. Keeravani	
2010	Vedam	"Egiripothe Entha Baguntundi"	M. M. Keeravani	M.M. Keeravani
2010	Subhapradam	"Nee Navve Kadadaka"	Mani Sharma	Karthik
2011	Raaj	"Bheemavaram Bulloda"	Koti	
2011	Raaj	"Sutiga Chusava"	Koti	
2011	Aha Naa Pellanta!	"Subhramanyam"	Raghu Kunche	
2011	Aha Naa Pellanta!	"Saturday Evening"	Raghu Kunche	
2012	Damarukam	"Kanya Kumari"	Devi Sri Prasad	Jaspreet Jasz
2012	Shirdi Sai	"Saranu Saranu"	M. M. Keeravani	
2012	Shirdi Sai	"Sai Ante Thalli'	M. M. Keeravani	
2012	Shirdi Sai	"Ekkadayya Sai"	M. M. Keeravani	
2012	Shirdi Sai	"Nee Padamulu"	M. M. Keeravani	
2012	Shirdi Sai	"Aarati"	M. M. Keeravani	
2012	Aakashamlo Sagam	"Naaku Neevu Pranam"	Yasho Krishna	
2013	Anthaka Mundu Aa Tarvatha	"Thamari Thone"	Kalyani Malik	
2013	Anthaka Mundu Aa Tarvatha	"Nenea Aa Nenena"	Kalyani Malik	
2013	Intinta Annamayya	"Venkatadri Samam"	M. M. Keeravani	
2013	Intinta Annamayya	"Neeke Saranu"	M. M. Keeravani	
2013	Maha Bhaktha Siriyala	"Ee Dehamu Pranamu"	Mangala Poornachandh	
2013	Maha Bhaktha Siriyala	"Kalyana Sugunakara"	Mangala Poornachandh	
2014	Lakshmi Raave Maa Intiki	"Aa Venneladaina"	K. M. RadhaKrishnan	
2014	Lakshmi Raave Maa Intiki	"Venu Gaana Lolude"	K. M. RadhaKrishnan	
2014	Oohalu Gusagusalade	"Em Sandeham Ledu"	Kalyani Malik	Kalyani Malik
2014	Anamika	"Kshanam Kshanam"	M. M. Keeravani	
2014	Anamika	"The Search"	M. M. Keeravani	
2014	Anamika	"Dead & Live"	M. M. Keeravani	
2014	Ice Cream 2	"Kiss Me"	Satya Kashyap	
2014	Ice Cream 2	"Kiss Me"(Remix)	Satya Kashyap	
2014	Alibaba Okkade Donga	"Adugadugu"	Sai Srikanth	
2014	Alibaba Okkade Donga	"Aakasham"	Sai Srikanth	
2014	April Fool	"Raa Raa"	Bunty	
2015	Mariyaan	"Inka Konchem Sepu"	A. R. Rahman	Vijay Prakash
2015	Mariyaan	"Sonapareeya"	A. R. Rahman	
2015	Yes	"Ee Vela Madilona"	Indraganti Laxmi Srinivas	
2015	Yes	"Premante Maayele"	Indraganti Laxmi Srinivas	
2016	Kalyana Vaibhogame	"Chakkandaala Chukka"	Kalyani Koduri	Kalyani Koduri
2016	Manalo Okadu	"Madhuram"	R. P. Patnaik	
2016	Raagam	"Yeenadu Neepai Jaali Padadhe"	Sunil Kashyap	Sunil Kashyap
2016	Evaro Taanevvaro	"Kammani Kalalu"	S Sriram	
2016	Atu Itu Kaani Hrudayam Thoti	"Maruvaleni"	GP Raavin	
2016	Aa Mugguru	"Pachani Pandiri"	Sathya Kashyap	
2016	Jilakarra Bellam	"Vintha Vinthaga"	Vandemataram Srinivas	
2016	Sri Sri	"Nela Nichi"	E. S. Murthy	
2017	Mixture Potlam	"Allari Godhari"	Madhavapeddi Suresh	
2017	Mixture Potlam	"Nee Maate"	Madhavapeddi Suresh	
2017	Om Namo Venkatesaya	"Vayyari Kalahamsika"	M. M. Keeravani	
2017	Malli Raava	"Malli Raava"(Reprise)	Shravan Bharadwaj	
2018	Srinivasa Kalyanam	"Modalaudaam"	Mickey J. Meyer	Anurag Kulkarni
2018	Srinivasa Kalyanam	"Vinavamma Toorupu Chukka"	Mickey J. Meyer	
2018	Mahanati	"Chivaraku Migiledi"	Mickey J. Meyer	
2018	Bluff Master	"Ye Maayo Yemo Teliyade"	Sunil Kashyap	
2019	NTR Mahanayakudu	"Ramanna Katha"	M. M. Keeravani	K. S. Chithra
2019	Pranavam	"Edo Edo Kaavalantu"	Padmanav Bharadwaj	
2019	Oorantha Anukuntunnaru	"Alavaatu Lo Leni"	K. M. Radha Krishnan	S. P. Balasubrahmanyam
2019	Paarari	"Siggu"	Mahith Narayan	Yazin Nizar
2020	30 Rojullo Preminchadam Ela	"Neeli Neeli Aakasham"	Anup Rubens	Sid Sriram
2020	Local Boy	"Tholi Suryuda"	Vivek–Mervin	
2020	Nireekshana	"Kalalu Yenno"	Mantra Anand	
2021	Guduputani	"Neeli Ningi Thaakalani"	Pratap Vidya	
2021	Bro	"Annayya "	Shekar Chandra	
2022	Sita Ramam	"Tharali Tharali"	Vishal Chandrashekhar	
2022	Madhi	"Soul Of Madhi"	P. V. R. Raja	Deepu
2024	Honeymoon Express	"Nijama"	Kalyani Malik	Kalyani Malik
2024	Pranaya Godari	"Choodakayyo Nemalikalla"	Markandeya Paramalla	Sai Charan
2025	Dooradarshini	"Naa Needa Veluthundhaa"	Anand Gurrana	Anurag Kulkarni
2026	Band Melam	"Ento Emo"	Vijai Bulganin	

==== Kannada ====
Sunitha's work as a playback singer in Kannada includes:

Year	Film	Song	Music director(s)	Co-singer(s)
1997	Bhoomigeetha	"Boodyaviya Habba"	Ilayaraaja	Ilayaraaja, Nepolean
1997	Bhoomigeetha	"Nodiravva Nodiravva"	Ilayaraaja	
1997	Bhoomigeetha	"Are Kamali Kamali"	Ilayaraaja	SPB Charan
2007	Savi Savi Nenapu	"Sooryanu Ee Divasa"	R.P. Patnaik	Rajesh
2009	Abhay	"Baanu Kempadante"	V. Hari Krishna	
2010	Cheluveye Ninne Nodalu	"Janumada Jodi"	V. Hari Krishna	Sonu Nigam
2010	Cheluveye Ninne Nodalu	"O Priyathama"	V. Hari Krishna	
2010	Modalasala	"Prathama Olava"	V. Hari Krishna	Srinivas
2011	Hudugaru	"Neerinalli Sanna Ale"(Duet)	V. Hari Krishna	Sonu Nigam
2011	Hudugaru	"Neerinalli Sanna Ale"(Solo)	V. Hari Krishna	
2012	Drama	"Hambalada Hoovanu"	V. Hari Krishna	
2012	Katari Veera Surasundarangi	"Jum Jumka"	V. Hari Krishna	Sonu Nigam
2012	Katari Veera Surasundarangi	"Oorige Nee"	V. Hari Krishna	Upendra
2012	Katari Veera Surasundarangi	"Parijatha"	V. Hari Krishna	
2012	Ko Ko	Mellane Naa Kolluve	Ramana Gogula	Karthik, Ramana Gogula
2012	Kiladi Kitty	Thumba thumba	Jassie Gift	Sonu Nigam
2014	Agraja	Rara priyachora	Nandhan Raj	
2014	Rose	Preethige Rose Andaru	Anoop Seelin	Nakul Abhyankar
2016	Santhu Straight Forward	Koodi itta	V. Hari Krishna	Sonu Nigam

==== Tamil ====
Sunitha's work as a playback singer in Tamil includes:

Year	Film	Director	Song	Music director(s)	Co-singer(s)
1997	Punniyavathi	Subburaj	Unakkoruthi	Ilaiyaraaja	S. P. Balasubrahmanyam, S. P. B. Charan, Ilaiyaraaja
2000	Kadhal Rojavae	Keyaar	Ninaitha varam	Ilaiyaraaja	P. Unnikrishnan
2001	Badri	P. A. Arun Prasad	Kadhal Solvadhu	Ramana Gogula	Srinivas

==== Non-film songs ====
Sunitha has sung the title songs for several Telugu television serials and has also worked as a dubbing artist for the series Andam.

Serial Name	Song
Antharangaalu	"Gundeki Savvadenduku"
Ruthuraagaalu	"Vaasanta Sameeramlaa"
Maunaraagam	"Ningi Taakutunnade Neeloni Dhairyam"
Antahpuram	"Antahpuram.. Silaleni Kovelamundu"
Koyilamma	"Anaganagaa Oka Thotalona"
Varudhini Parinayam	"Chandamaama Ni Sarijodu"
Enneno janmala bandham	"Enneno janmala bandham"

==== Private albums ====
Sunitha has recorded numerous private albums, with Meera Padavali and Aanota–Manasu Palike Vela, composed by her guru Kalaga Krishna Mohan, among her most recognised works. She is featured in the devotional album Sri Ramachandra Krupalu, a bhajan by Tulsidas, produced by sunithamusic.com, and her album Chandrashekara Ashtakam, composed by Sai Madhukar, is also notable.

Other private albums include Raghuram, Sai Sudha, Sri Venkateswara Tatwanidhi, Sri Vallabha Bhakthi Geethalu, Sai Darshanam, Sri Chidvilasam, Amma Durgamma, Pahimaam, Sri Rama Charanam, Govinda Ganamrutham, Saye Dhaivam, and Bathuku Paata.

==== Performances ====
Sunitha has performed extensively as a live artist in 19 countries, including the United States (almost annually since 1999), the United Kingdom, the United Arab Emirates, Singapore, Malaysia, Uganda, Nigeria, Tanzania, South Africa, Australia, Scotland, Ireland, Sri Lanka, Thailand, Japan, Oman, Bahrain, Qatar, and Mauritius.

In 2009 she launched her concert series Melodious Moments with Sunitha, expanding it in 2019 with performances in five U.S. cities: San Jose, Charlotte, Cleveland, Los Angeles, and Indianapolis, with the Indianapolis event held at the Old National Center. Following this success the series debuted in India with a concert at Shilpakala Vedika, Hyderabad on 4 August 2019, which was later extended to other cities and towns across the Telugu-speaking states.

Sunitha's other notable performances include the foundation-laying ceremony for Amaravati, the bicentennial celebrations of Secunderabad organised by the Government of Andhra Pradesh, the golden jubilee celebrations of the state assembly, and a rendition of "Vande Mataram" with S. P. Balasubrahmanyam at the Congress plenary session commemorating 50 years of Indian independence.

== Filmography ==
=== Film dubbing artist ===
Dubbed for	Films
Soundarya	Choodalani Vundi (1998); Ninne Premistha (2000); Seetayya (2003); Swetha Naagu (2004); Shiva Shankar (2004)
Raasi	Pelli Pandiri (1998); Sandade Sandadi (2002); Sriramachandrulu (2003)
Sanghavi	Seetharama Raju (1999); Ravanna (2000)
Antara Mali	Prema Kadha (1999)
Preeti Jhangiani	Thammudu (1999); Adhipathi (2001); Apparao Driving School (2004) Narasimha Naidu (2001)
Simran	Goppinti Alludu (2000) Yuvaraju (2000)
Sakshi Sivanand	Maa Pelliki Randi (2000); Simharasi (2001)
Priya Gill	Rayalaseema Ramanna Chowdary (2000)
Rambha	Choosoddaam Randi (2000)
Ameesha Patel	Badri (2000); Naani (2004); Narasimhudu (2005)
Namrata Shirodkar	Vamsi (2000)
Bhumika Chawla	Yuvakudu (2000); Snehamante Idera (2001); Simhadri (2003); Aadanthe Ado Type (2003); Jai Chiranjeeva (2005); Mayabazar (2006); Anasuya (2007); Amaravati (2009); Naa Style Veru (2009); Yagam (2010); Collector Gari Bharya (2010); Laddu Babu (2014)
Laya	Manoharam (2000); Naalo Unna Prema (2001); Vijayendra Varma (2004)
Shaheen Khan	Chiru Navvutho (2000)
Asha Saini	Antha Mana Manchike (2000); Subhakaryam (2000) Nuvvu naaku nachav(2001)
Reemma Sen	Chitram (2000); Bava Nachadu (2001); Seema Simham (2002); Veede (2003); Yamagola Malli Modalayindi (2007); Mugguru (2011)
Sneha	Priyamaina Neeku(2001); Tholi Valapu (2001); Hanuman Junction (2001); Venky (2004); Radha Gopalam (2005); Sankranti (2005); Sri Ramadasu (2005); That Is Pandu (2005); Evandoi Srivaru (2006); Maharadhi (2007); Madhumasam (2007); Pandurangadu (2008); Adivishnu (2008); Nee Sukhame Ne Korukunna (2008); Amaravathi (2009); Rajanna (2011); Ulavacharu Biryani (2014)
Anjala Zhaveri	Prema Sandadi (2001); Aaptudu (2004)
Malavika	Navvuthu Bathakalira (2001)
Sindhu Menon	Bhadrachalam (2001)
Tanu Roy	Manasantha Nuvve (2001); Itlu Sravani Subramanyam (2001)
Shruthi Raj	Veedekkadi Mogudandi? (2001); O Chinadana (2002)
Anita Hassanandani	Nuvvu Nenu (2001); Thotti Gang (2002); Ninne Ishtapaddanu (2003); Aadanthe Ado Type (2003); Nenu Pelliki Ready (2004)
Sonali Joshi	Subbu (2001)
Rekha Vedavyas	Jabili (2001)
Gajala	Student No.1 (2001); O Chinadana (2002); Adrustam (2002); Allari Ramudu (2002); Bharatasimha Reddy (2002); Vijayam (2003); Money Money, More Money (2011)
Ashima Bhalla	Daddy (2001)
Kanchi Kaul	Sampangi (2001); Cheppalani Vundhi (2001); Family Circus (2001); Idi Maa Ashokgadi Love Story (2002); Siva Rama Raju (2002)
Gracy Singh	Santosham (2002)
Rachna Banerjee	Neethone Vuntanu (2002); Lahiri Lahiri Lahirilo (2002)
Richa Pallod	Naa Manasistha Raa (2002); Holi (2002)
Rimi Sen	Nee Thodu Kavali (2002)
Sonali Bendre	Manmadhudu (2002); Indra (2002); Shankar Dada MBBS (2004)
Sadha	Jayam (2002); Naaga (2003); Praanam (2003); Leela Mahal Center (2004); Donga Dongadi (2004); Avunanna Kaadanna (2005); Chukkallo Chandrudu (2006); Veerabhadra (2006); Classmates (2007); Shankar Dada Zindabad (2007)
Shriya Saran	Nuvve Nuvve (2002); Chennakesava Reddy (2002); Neeku Nenu Naaku Nuvvu (2003); Nenunnanu (2004); Mogudu Pellam O Dongodu (2005); Bhageeratha (2005); Sada Mee Sevalo (2005); Balu ABCDEFG ( 2005); Boss, I Love You (2006); Life Is Beautiful (2012); Manam (2014); Gopala Gopala (2015); Gautamiputra Satakarni(2017) (750th Film); Paisa Vasool ( 2021)
Namitha	Gemini (2002); Oka Raju Oka Rani (2003); Oka Radha Iddaru Krishnula Pelli (2004)
Ankitha	Dhanalakshmi, I Love You (2002); Premalo Pavani Kalyan (2002); Andaru Dongale Dorikithe (2004); Vijayendra Varma (2004); Seetharamudu (2006)
Keerti Chawla	Aadi (2002); Kaasi (2004)
Sridevi Vijaykumar	Eeshwar (2002); Pellikani Prasad (2008); Manjeera (2009); Veera (2011)
Gayatri Jayaraman	Aaduthu Paaduthu (2002)
Kaniha	Ottesi Cheputunna (2003)
Rakshita	Pellam Oorelithe (2003); Nijam (2003); Jagapati (2005)
Aarti Chhabria	Okariki Okaru(2003); Intlo Srimathi Veedhilo Kumari (2004)
Neha Bamb	Dil (2003); Athade Oka Sainyam (2004)
Aditi Agarwal	Gangotri (2003)
Kalyani	Vasantam (2003); Kabaddi Kabaddi (2003); Dongodu (2003); Letha Manasulu (2004); Pedababu (2004)
Renu Desai	Johnny (2003)
Jyothika	Tagore (2003)
Charmy Kaur	Neeke Manasichaanu (2003); Gowri (2003); Mass (2004); Anukokunda Oka Roju (2005); Political Rowdy (2005); Lakshmi (2006); Style (2006); Pournami (2006); Chinnodu (2006); Sundarakanda (2007); Mantra (2007 film) (2007); Kousalya Supraja Rama (2008); Michael Madana Kamaraju (2008); Kavya's Diary(2009); Manorama (2009); Nagaram Nidrapotunna Vela (2011); Sevakudu (2013)
Genelia D'Souza	Satyam (2003); Sye (2004); Naa Alludu (2005); Happy (2006); Mr.Medhavi (2008)
Nikita Thukral	Sambaram (2003); Kushi Kushiga (2004); Evandoi Srivaru (2006); Nee Navve Chalu (2006); Maharajsri (2006); Don (2007)
Ramya	Abhimanyu (2003)
Mounika	Maa Alludu Very Good (2003)
Asin	Lakshmi Narasimha (2004)
Meera Jasmine	Ammayi Bagundi (2004); Gorintaku (2008); Bangaru Babu (2009); A Aa E Ee (2009)
Laila	Mr & Mrs Sailaja Krishnamurthy (2004)
Padmapriya Janakiraman	Seenu Vasanthi Lakshmi (2004); Andari Bandhuvaya (2010); Patel S. I. R. (2017)
Meera Vasudevan	Anjali I Love You (2004)
Kamalinee Mukherjee	Anand(2004); Godavari (2006); Raghavan (2006); Pellaindi Kaani (2007); Jalsa (2008); Gopi Gopika Godavari (2009); Maa Annayya Bangaram (2010); Shirdi Sai (2012); Ramachari (2013); Govindudu Andarivadele (2014)
Archana	Nenu (2004)
Navaneet Kaur	Sathruvvu (2004); Good Boy (2005); Bangaru Konda (2007)
Moonmoon Banerjee	Yagnam (2004)
Katrina Kaif	Malliswari (2004)
Nauheed Cyrusi	Sakhiya (2004)
Santoshi	Jai (2004)
Arti Agarwal	Soggadu (2005); Andala Ramudu (2006); Deepavali (2008)
Anuradha Mehta	Nuvvante Naakishtam (2005)
Sangeetha	Naa Oopiri (2005)
Tabu	Andarivaadu (2005); Shock (2006)
Gopika	Muddhula Koduku (2005); Veedhi (2006); Veedu Mamoolodu Kadu (2008)
Nayanthara	Ghajini (2005) (Telugu version); Boss, I Love You (2006); Tulasi (2007); Dubai Seenu (2007); Simha (2010); Sri Rama Rajyam(2011); Anamika (2014); Babu Bangaram (2016); Jai Simha (2018); Sye Raa Narasimha Reddy (2019); God Father (2022); Annapoorani (2023) (Telugu Version)
Parvati Melton	Vennela (2005); Allare Allari (2006)
Gowri Pandit	Andhrudu (2005)
Gowri Munjal	Bunny (2005); Sri Krishna 2006 (2006)
Saloni Aswani	Dhana 51 (2005); Oka Oorilo (2005)
Poonam Bajwa	Modati Cinema (2005)
Raima Sen	Dhairyam (2005)
Tamannaah	Sri (2005); Happy Days (2007); Kalidasu (2008)
Anushka Shetty	Mahanandi (2005); Astram (2006); Don (2007); Swagatam (2008); Baladur (2008); Chintakayala Ravi (2008)
Sindhu Tolani	Athanokkade (2005); Gowtam SSC (2005); Pothe Poni (2006); Nee Navve Chalu (2006); Pournami (2006)
Sameera Reddy	Ashok (2006)
Priyamani	Pellaina Kothalo (2006); Nava Vasantham (2007); Pravarakhyudu (2009); Raaj (2011)
Kamna Jethmalani	Ranam (2006); Samanyudu (2006); Toss (2007); Andamaina Abadham (2009)
Diya	Asadhyudu (2006)
Sridevika	Rajababu (2006)
Sheela	Seethakoka Chiluka (2006); Parama Veera Chakra (2011)
Ileana D'Cruz	Aata (2007)
Trisha Krishnan	Adavari Matalaku Ardhale Verule (2007); Krishna (2008) 96 (2020) (Telugu Version)
Neha Jhulka	Okkadunnadu (2007); Viyyala Vari Kayyalu (2007)
Shabna Khan	Bahumati (2007)
Vedhika	Vijayadasami (2007); Baanam (2009); Daggaraga Dooramga (2011)
Hansika Motwani	Kantri (2008)
Sneha Ullal	Ullasamga Utsahamga (2008); Nenu Meeku Telusa? (2008)
Bindu Madhavi	Avakai Biryani (2008)
Sonal Chauhan	Rainbow (2008)
Mamta Mohandas	Victory (2008)
Meera Chopra	Vaana (2008); Maaro (2011)
Bhavana	Hero (2008)
Aditi Sharma	Gunde Jhallumandi (2008)
Payal Ghosh	Prayanam (2009)
Kriti Kharbanda	Boni (2009); Teen Maar (2011)
Richa Gangopadhyay	Leader (2010); Nagavalli (2010); Mirapakaay (2011); Mirchi (2013); Bhai (2013)
Nisha Agarwal	Yemaindi Ee Vela (2010)
Manjari Fadnis	Inkosaari (2010); Shubhapradham (2010); Shakti (2011)
Vimala Raman	Gaayam 2 (2010); Chukkalanti Ammayi Chakkanaina Abbayi (2013)
Shruti Hassan	Anaganaga O Dheerudu (2011)
Isha Chawla	Mr Pellikoduku (2013)
Tapsee Pannu	Shadow (2013)
Parvathy	Maryan (2013)
Shanvi Srivastava	Adda (2013); Rowdy (2014); Pyar Mein Padipoyane (2014)
Regina Cassandra	Subramanyam for Sale (2015); Shourya (2016)
Sandhya Raju	Natyam (2016) short film
Lavanya Tripathi	Soggade Chinni Nayana (2016)
Namitha Pramod	Kathalo Rajakumari (2017)
Aakanksha Singh	Devdas (2018)
Aishwarya Rai Bachchan	Ponniyin Selvan: I (Telugu Version) (2022); Ponniyin Selvan: II (Telugu Version) (2023)

=== Television appearances ===
Sunitha has anchored, hosted, and performed as a singer in many music programs and live shows on various Telugu television channels. She has presented over 500 programs on AIR, DD channel, ETV, Gemini TV, and MAA TV.

Year	Program Name	Channel	Role	Notes
1995	Paadave Koyila Single episode live show	Doordarshan Andhra	Singer	The first ever musical live show organised by DD
1996	Navaragam	Gemini TV	Anchor	Music competition show where most of the Telugu singers were introduced
1996	Yours lovingly	Gemini TV	Anchor	Birthday wishes show
2008	Saptaswaraalu	ETV	Anchor	Singers competition that introduced most of the Telugu singers
	Antakshari	Vanita TV	Anchor	Musical competition between participants
2004 2014 2020 - 2021	Saregamapa	Zee Telugu	Anchor	Saregamapa Lil Champs: hosted music competition for kids Appeared as a guest judge in Saregamapa: The Next Singing Icon in 2020 and 2021
2007 2009 2014	Jhummandi Naadam	ETV	Host & singer	Musical interview show with live bands
2014 till date	Swarabhishekam	ETV	Singer & anchor in few US, UK shows	Musical show with veteran and upcoming singers
	Super Singer Seasons 4 to 7	MAA TV	Mentor & judge Season 7 title winner	Music competition show between Telugu singers
2014 to 2019	Annamayya paataku Pattabhishekam	SVBC	Anchor & singer	A show where more than 1000 Annamayya keerthana's were featured in collaboration with Tirumala Tirupathi Devasthanam, movie director K Raghavendra Rao, and music composer MM Keeravani
2020	Drama Juniors	Zee5	Judge	Children from different parts of the country showcase their varied acting skills and compete with each other to win the title
2022	Paaduthaa Teeyaga	ETV	Judge	A program to bring out emerging singing talent launched in 1996 by the Legendary SPB

=== Short films ===
Sunitha played the lead role in her first short film Raagam, which was nominated in the short film category of the South Indian International Movie Awards (SIIMA) in 2017.

Year	Film	Language	Director	Role
2016	Raagam	Telugu	Sree Chaitu	Lead
2018	Thadasthu	Telugu	R.P. Patnaik	Special appearance

== Awards ==
=== Nandi Awards ===
- Nandi Award for Best Female Playback Singer for TV film Antha Rangaalu (1999)
- Nandi Award for Best Female Dubbing Artist for the movie Jayam (2002)
- Nandi Award for Best Female Playback Singer for the Movie Athade Oka Sainyam (2003)
- Nandi Award for Best Female Dubbing Artist for the movie Anand (voice of the Kamalinee Mukherjee) (2004)
- Nandi Award for Best Female Dubbing Artist for the movie Pothe Poni (2005)
- Nandi Award for Best Female Playback Singer for the movie Godavari (2006)
- Nandi Award for Best Female Playback Singer for TV film Anthahpuram (2010)
- Nandi Award for a TV film called Mamathala Kovela (2011)
- Nandi Award for Best Female Dubbing Artist for the movie Sri Rama Rajyam (voice of the Nayantara) (2012)

=== Filmfare Awards ===
- Filmfare Award for Best Female Playback Singer - Kannada (2010) for the movie Cheluveye Ninne Nodalu for the song "O Priyathama"
- Filmfare Award for Best Female Playback Singer - Telugu (2014) for the movie Oohalu Gusagusalade for the song "Em Sandehamledu"
- Nominated: Filmfare Award for Best Female Playback Singer - Telugu (2009) for the movie Pravarakhyudu for the song "Neela Neela Mabbulu"
- Nominated: Filmfare Award for Best Female Playback Singer - Telugu (2010) for the movie Vedam for the song "Egiripothe"
- Nominated: Filmfare Award for Best Female Playback Singer - Kannada (2010) for the movie Modalasala for the song "Prathama"

=== Other Awards ===
- TV Award 2009 for Best Female Playback Singer presented by Delhi Telugu Academy in Hyderabad on 8 August 2010
- Lata Mangeshkar Best Singer Award for 2011 presented by the State Government
- TSR TV9 Best Playback Singer Aaward for the song "Em Sandeham ledu" in 2014
- NTR Memorial Award 2015
- Singer of the Decade Award in 2016 presented by Zee Apsara Awards
- Prestigious Indywood Academy Award as best playback singer for the song "Chivaraku migiledhi" from the epic biopic Mahanati in 2018
- Vishishta seva puraskar by "I Stand for the Nation" NGO in 2019
