= Dham (film) =

- Movie Poster
- Directed by: Raju Voopati
- Written by: Nagaraju; Sampath (dialogues)
- Screenplay by: Raju Voopati
- Story by: Raju Voopati
- Produced by: Mohana Radha; Kishore Babu; Radhika (Presents)
- Starring: Jagapati Babu; Sonia Agarwal; Neha Mehta
- Cinematography: S. Arun Kumar
- Edited by: Marthand K. Venkatesh
- Music by: Ramana Gogula
- Production company: Radaan Mediaworks
- Release date: 25 July 2003
- Running time: 157 minutes
- Country: India
- Language: Telugu

Dham (transl. Power) is a 2003 Indian Telugu-language action film produced by Mohana Radha and Kishore Babu under Radaan Mediaworks banner, presented by Radhika and directed by Raju Voopati. The film stars Jagapati Babu, Sonia Agarwal and Neha Mehta, with music composed by Ramana Gogula.

== Plot ==
Rushi runs a yoga center, where he comes across four students who are best friends: Chaitanya, Prasanth, Santosh, and Vicky. Pooja, a female student, falls in love with Rushi. All of them become closer and become good friends with Rushi.

Meanwhile, Rushi learns that the four youngsters have had problematic love lives. Chaitanya is forcibly separated from his lover Radhika by her father Satya, Santosh is rejected by his lover Sarada, a classical singer, because he stammers, and Prasanth is hated by his lover Priya because he pretends to be a sports champion. Rushi assists them in solving their problems and makes their love successful. In the process, they learn about Rushi's past.

Rushi is a hot-blooded, angry young man who overreacts to minor problems. He falls in love with Anjali, who hates violence, but unknowingly, she is the daughter of a mafia don, Neelakantam. Rushi and Neelakantam clash, and he creates a misunderstanding between Rushi and Anjali and makes Rushi abandon his love. But the four couples show their gratitude by reuniting Rushi and Anjali.

== Cast ==
- Jagapati Babu as Rushi
- Sonia Agarwal as Pooja
- Nandamuri Chaitanya Krishna as Chaitanya
- Brahmanandam as Shankara Sastry
- Ali
- Venu Madhav as Uday Tarun
- Avinash as Neelakantam
- Chalapathi Rao as Rushi's father
- Satya Prakash as Satya
- Mallikarjuna Rao as Satya's assistant
- Suman Setty as Rushi's assistant
- Narsingh Yadav as Goon
- Kavitha as Rushi's mother
- Neha Mehta as Anjali
- Anil as Prasanth
- Ravitej as Santosh
- Vikram as Vicky
- Junior Relangi as Pooja's father
- Sony Raj as Priya
- Swapna Madhuri as Sarada
- Ooma as Radhika
- Radhika Varma as Meghana
- Pavala Shyamala as Prashanth's grandmother

== Soundtrack ==
Dham

Film score by Ramana Gogula
- Released: 2003
- Genre: Soundtrack
- Length: 29:53
- Label: Supreme Music
- Producer: Ramana Gogula

Ramana Gogula chronology
Johnny (2003)	Dham (2003)	Chinnodu (2006)

Music composed by Ramana Gogula. Music released on Supreme Music Company.

No.	Title	Lyrics	Singer(s)	Length
1.	"Challa Galiki"	Surendra Krishna	Hariharan, Nanditha	5:01
2.	"Ayyo Rama"	RDS Prakash	Kousalya	4:31
3.	"Nelloru Nerajana"	Kandikonda	Ramana Gogula, Nandita	3:52
4.	"Maru Maru Mallelu (Bit)"	Veturi	Rajesh	1:04
5.	"Challa Galiki (Bit)"	Surendra Krishna	Hariharan, Nandita	0:58
6.	"Friendship"	Surendra Krishna	Ramana Gogula	4:41
7.	"Addira Banna"	Surendra Krishna	Shankar Mahadevan, Chitra	4:43
8.	"Friendship"	Surendra Krishna	Rajesh Krishnan, Nandita	5:03
Total length:				29:53

== Reception ==
Mithun Verma of Fullhyd rated the film 1 star. Jeevi of Idlebrain rated it 2.75 out of 5.
