= Badri (2001 film) =

2001 Indian Tamil-language sports action film

- Release poster
- Directed by: P. A. Arun Prasad
- Written by: N. Prasanna Kumar (dialogues)
- Story by: P. A. Arun Prasad
- Based on: Thammudu (Telugu)
- Produced by: B. Sivarama Krishna
- Starring: Vijay; Bhumika; Monal
- Cinematography: Jayanan Vincent
- Edited by: Nandamuri Hari
- Music by: Ramana Gogula (Soundtrack); Devi Sri Prasad (Background Score)
- Production company: Sri Venkateswara Art Films
- Distributed by: Oscar Films
- Release date: 12 April 2001
- Running time: 155 minutes
- Country: India
- Language: Tamil

Badri is a 2001 Indian Tamil-language sports drama film directed by P. A. Arun Prasad. The film stars Vijay in the main lead role as a college brat who turns into a kickboxer to prove himself. Bhumika, Monal, Vivek, Riyaz Khan and Bhupinder Singh play supporting roles. The film marked Bhumika's Tamil debut. The film's soundtrack was composed by Ramana Gogula, while the background score was composed by Devi Sri Prasad. It is the Tamil remake of the director's own Telugu film Thammudu (1999).

Filming began in September 2000 after Vijay finished shooting for his previous films such as Priyamanavale (2000) and Friends (2001), and was completed by March 2001, a month before its release. The film had a theatrical release on 12 April 2001 and was a commercial success, completing a 100-day theatrical run at the Tamil Nadu box office. India Today listed the film among Vijay's 10 best film performances.

== Plot ==
Sri Badrinatha Moorthy aka "Badri" is a happy-go-lucky youth who spends his days roaming around with his friends Azhagu, Howrah, and Joot; ogling girls; and repeatedly failing his exams. His father, Viswanathan, a café owner, is disgusted with his irresponsibility and constantly chides him. His older brother Vetri, who is a college-level kickboxer and Viswanathan's favorite son, on the other hand, dotes on him. Janaki aka "Jaanu", Badri's neighbor and childhood friend, is in love with him, but the feeling is one-sided as Badri mainly considers her as a source of money and cars; Badri constantly borrows large amounts of money from Jaanu as well as expensive cars from her father's garage to impress girls.

One day, Badri meets Mamathi, who is a rich college girl, and poses as a wealthy industrialist's son in order to impress and love her. Mamathi falls for Badri's lies and soon expresses her love to him, but when she finds out the truth, she breaks up with him and insults him in front of his father. When Viswanathan further finds out that Badri has taken large amounts of money from Jaanu, he kicks out Badri, tired of his antics.

Badri, who is now homeless, finds support from Jaanu, who advises him to be more responsible and redeem himself in Viswanathan's eyes. He realises the love that Jaanu has for him and begins to reform himself. Meanwhile, Vetri is attacked and seriously injured by his kickboxing arch-rival Rohit, who happens to be Mamathi's new boyfriend and Badri's enemy as well, thus ruling him out for the final match of the inter-collegiate kickboxing championship against Rohit. Badri decides to fight for Vetri by taking his place in the final and trains hard for it. Finally, he defeats Rohit in the final, thus winning the kickboxing championship. He dedicates the trophy to Vetri, reconciles with Viswanathan, and reciprocates Jaanu's love.

== Cast ==
- Vijay as Sri Badrinatha Moorthy (Badri)
- Bhumika as Janaki (Jaanu)
- Monal as Mamathi
- Vivek as Azhagu
- Riyaz Khan as Vetri, Badri's brother
- Bhupinder Singh as Rohit
- Kitty as Viswanathan, Badri and Vetri's father
- Malaysia Vasudevan as Janaki's father
- Dhamu as Howrah, Badri's friend
- Sanjeev Venkat as Joot, Badri's friend
- Anu Mohan as Shanmugam
- Shihan Hussaini as Vetri's coach
- Kazan Khan as Rohith's coach
- Meenakumari as Anitha
- Pandu as Professor
- Kottachi as Barber
- Raneesh as Badri's friend
- Alphonsa (special appearance in the song "Salaam Maharasa")

== Production ==
Badri, produced by Sri Venkateswara Art Films, was announced in September 2000 after Vijay finished shooting for his previous blockbuster films such as Priyamanavale (2000) and Friends (2001), and it was slated to be the Tamil remake of the Telugu film Thammudu (1999) starring Pawan Kalyan. Thammudu itself was inspired by the 1979 American film Breaking Away. 1992 Hindi film Jo Jeeta Wohi Sikandar was also inspired from the American film.

P. A. Arun Prasad, who directed the original, reprises his role, as did the composer Ramana Gogula. Most of the other technicians were also taken from Telugu cinema. Art director G. K. hired 200 technicians to create a high tech complex in Vahini studios for the film. When first announced, it was reported that Vijay would essay dual lead roles, although this claim later proved to be untrue. Bhupinder Singh was also selected to reprise his role from the original version as Rohit, the antagonist.

During the filming of a pivotal scene in the "Travelling Soldier" song, Vijay allowed a car to run over his fingers, and the shot was canned with three cameras, with the scene attracting media attention. Martial arts expert Shihan Hussaini helped with the production and features in the film in a guest appearance. Other scenes were shot at Amir Mahal in Chennai.

The film teamed up with Coca-Cola for their publicity campaign after Vijay had signed on to the soft drink company as a brand ambassador.

== Soundtrack ==
Badri

Soundtrack album by Ramana Gogula
- Released: 30 March 2001
- Recorded: 2000–2001
- Genre: Feature film soundtrack
- Length: 38:31
- Labels: Star Music; Saregama
- Producer: Ramana Gogula

Ramana Gogula chronology
Yuvaraju (2000)	Badri (2001)	Yuvaraja (2001)

The soundtrack of the film was composed by Ramana Gogula who composed for the original film and notably remains his first and only Tamil film he had worked so far. The lyrics were penned by Palani Bharathi. Three tunes from the original version were retained ("Travelling Soldier", "Vayyari Bhama", "Pedavi Datani") while "Kalakalakudhu" is based on "Gunthalakidi" from Yuvaraju. Indiainfo wrote "On the whole the songs of the movie are quite good and it is worth a buy".

All lyrics are written by Palani Bharathi.

Tracklist
No.	Title	Artist(s)	Length
1.	"Travelling Soldier"	Ramana Gogula	04:05
2.	"Adi Jivunnu Jivunnu"	Ramana Gogula, Devi Sri Prasad	02:04
3.	"Salaam Maharasa"	Devan Ekambaram, Priya Himesh	02:21
4.	"Ennoda Laila"	Vijay	05:13
5.	"Kalakalakudhu"	Mano	05:04
6.	"Kalakalakudhu"	Shankar Mahadevan	05:04
7.	"Kadhal Solvadhu"	Srinivas, Sunitha Upadrashta	04:34
8.	"Angel Vandhaaley"	Devi Sri Prasad, Chithra	04:45
9.	"King Of Chennai"	Devi Sri Prasad	04:17
10.	"Stella Maris Laara"	Tippu, Vivek, Dhamu	01:44
Total length:			38:31

== Release and reception ==
Badri released on 12 April 2001 and ran for 100 days in theatres. The Hindu reported that the film "Badri clearly reveals the diligence and sincerity of Vijay. But would these alone make a film wholesome?" and that Monal "needs to work on her expressions". A reviewer from entertainment portal Ananda Vikatan rated the film 40 out of 100. Tamil Movies Cafe wrote "Badri moves at a fairly neat pace in the earlier part, lags a little later, and then picks up speed towards the end." Visual Dasan of Kalki panned certain humorous portions, Monal's acting, too many songs but praised the acting of Vijay and Bhoomika. Chennai Online wrote "Bhadri' moves at a fairly neat pace in the earlier part, lags a little later, and then picks up speed towards the end." Cinesouth wrote "[..] the director had played with the first half with no worthwhile move in the storyline. There is story value in the second half. But the director had not evinced any keen interest in forming the screenplay. But he has made Vijay to do some risky feats in which he excels. This way, Director Arun Prasad has escaped intelligently".

The film became Vijay's fifth consecutive successful film, after Kannukkul Nilavu (2000), Kushi (2000), Priyamaanavale (2000) and Friends (2001).
