= Boni (film) =

- Directed by: Raj Pippalla
- Written by: Raj Pippalla
- Dialogues by: Rajasimha; Lakshmi Bhoopal
- Produced by: Ramana Gogula
- Starring: Sumanth; Kriti Kharbanda
- Cinematography: I. Andrew
- Edited by: M. R. Varma
- Music by: Ramana Gogula
- Production company: Green Mangoes Cinema
- Release date: 12 June 2009
- Country: India
- Language: Telugu

Boni (transl. Maiden/inaugural) is a 2009 Telugu-language action film directed by Raj Pippalla and starring Sumanth and Kriti Kharbanda. Ramana Gogula composed the music as well as producing the film.

== Plot ==
DD and Chinna are close friends who are raised in an orphanage. They are fond of Saraswatamma who took care of them there. Saraswatamma was very good at preparing tamarind rice (pulihora). DD wishes to start a pulihora center in memory of Saraswatamma when he grows up. In order to earn the money to do so, he joins a mafia gang doing small odd jobs. Pragati is the daughter of a millionaire politician. She is kind hearted and works for an NGO. She learns that a certain landlord has cheated the people of a village. The court, out of no choice, tells the farmers that they need to pay 40 million to the landlord if they wish to regain their land. Pragati asks her father to help out the villagers and he says, yes. Later when she finds out that her father has actually lied to her, she argues with him and leaves his house. Pragati's friend sketches a self-kidnap plan in order to demand 40 million as ransom from her father. Things go awry when DD and Chinna accidentally kidnap Pragathi at the same time as she is to be kidnapped by someone else. The rest of the story regards how DD and Pragati realise their goals while falling in love with each other.

== Cast ==
- Sumanth as DD
- Kriti Kharbanda as Pragati
- Trinetrudu as Chinna
- Jaya Prakash Reddy as Das
- Sudha as Saraswatamma
- Tanikella Bharani as Giri
- Chandra Mohan
- Ahuti Prasad
- Satya Prakash
- Harsha Vardhan as Sub-Inspector
- Satyam Rajesh as a police officer
- Naresh as a police officer
- Suthi Velu
- Venu Madhav
- Surekha Vani
- Kota Shankar
- Babloo
- Antara Biswas as item number

== Production ==
Raj Pippialla met Sumanth on the sets of Pourudu with two scripts with the first one involving a high budget. Sumanth okayed the second script but needed a producer. Raj met Sumanth again during the interval shoot of Pourudu with Ramana Gogula as the producer. Gogula revealed that he accidentally became the producer of the film when he tried to help Raj find a producer. The film's title was announced in February 2009. The film is a bout a goonda in a basti (transl. slum). The film was planned to be shot in 75 days but was shot in 100 days due to the heavy rain. Around 100,000 foot of spool was used for the film.

== Soundtrack ==
The music was composed by Ramana Gogula and released by Aditya Music. All lyrics were written by Ramajogayya Sastry. The audio launch was held in Hotel Novotel (now Novotel Hyderabad Convention Centre) on 20 April 2009 with Mani Sharma, Koti, R. P. Patnaik and Chakri attending as guests.

Boni

Soundtrack album by Ramana Gogula
- Released: 20 April 2009
- Recorded: 2009
- Genre: Soundtrack
- Length: 27:55
- Label: Aditya Music
- Producer: Ramana Gogula

Ramana Gogula chronology
Viyyalavari Kayyalu (2007)	Boni (2009)	Ko Ko (2012)

Track list
No.	Title	Singer(s)	Length
1.	"Nammaleni Kale Nijamayena"	Deepu, Sunitha Upadrashta	4:22
2.	"Kadantana"	Hemachandra, Sravana Bhargavi	3:12
3.	"Modati Choope Nalona"	N. C. Karunya, Pranavi	4:38
4.	"Maa Jatakadithe"	Linus Madiri, Geetha Madhuri	4:06
5.	"Boni"	Ramana Gogula	2:47
6.	"Boni" (Di Bi Daba)	Ramana Gogula	2:48
7.	"Arere Chejarinde" (Male)	Sreerama Chandra	1:18
8.	"Arere Chejarinde"	Sreerama Chandra, Sudha Jeevan	4:44
Total length:			27:55

== Reception ==
Jeevi of Idlebrain.com rated the film 2/5 and wrote, "It is always better to fail while making a different film than failing while making a routine formula film. Boni is an attempt to come up with something different". Radhika Rajamani of Rediff.com rated the film 2/5 stars and wrote, "All in all a glossy effort if you can overlook the loose ends".
