= Yuvaraja (film) =

2001 Indian Kannada-language sports drama film

- Promotional poster
- Directed by: Puri Jagannadh
- Written by: M. S. Ramesh R. Rajashekhar (Dialogues)
- Screenplay by: Puri Jagannath
- Story by: P. A. Arun Prasad
- Based on: Thammudu (Telugu)
- Produced by: R. Srinivas
- Starring: Shiva Rajkumar; Lisa Ray; Bhavna Pani
- Narrated by: Puri Jagannadh
- Cinematography: K. Datthu
- Edited by: S. Manohar
- Music by: Ramana Gogula
- Production company: R S Productions
- Distributed by: Bahar Films
- Release date: 2 November 2001
- Running time: 147 minutes
- Country: India
- Language: Kannada

Yuvaraja is a 2001 Indian Kannada-language sports drama film directed by Puri Jagannadh and produced by R. Srinivas. The film stars Shiva Rajkumar, Bhavna Pani and Lisa Ray - with the former debuting as actress and the latter debuting in Kannada. The film was released on 2 November 2001 across theatres in Karnataka. The film finished a 50-day theatrical run.

The film is a remake of 1999 Telugu movie Thammudu which was based on the 1992 Hindi movie Jo Jeeta Wohi Sikandar which in turn was inspired by the 1979 American film Breaking Away.

== Plot ==
Raju alias Yuvaraja is the youngest son of a family and a careless guy, always going around girls and enjoying with them. His womanizing habits are a source of heartburn for his father. His elder brother Chakri is a kickboxer and his father's favourite son. Janu, Yuvaraja's neighbour, is in love with him, but Raju considers her a good friend only and a source of money and cars to impress girls (Janu's father is a garage owner).

Raju starts going out with Lovely, a rich college girl, and poses as a wealthy millionaire's son to impress her and love her. Lovely falls for his lies and starts loving him. However, she soon finds out that Raju has lied to her and dumps him and insults him in front of his father. Raju's father, tired of his son's antics, kicks him out of the house and shuns him. Raju is now homeless and Jaanu tells him to be more responsible of himself. Later, Chakri is attacked by Rohith, who happens to be Lovely's new boyfriend and his enemy, and his friends and is bedridden, unable to take part in the kickboxing championship. Raju decides to fight for his brother and to redeem himself in his father's eyes by fighting in the championship match against Rohith. Deciding to seek revenge for his brother's accident and to prove himself to his father, Yuvaraja defeats Rohith after a long and bloody boxing match, redeems himself in front of his father's eyes and finally accepts Janu's love. Hence the film ends with a happy ending, and everyone greets Raju as Yuvaraja.

== Cast ==
- Shiva Rajkumar as Raju alias Yuvaraja Rathnam
- Lisa Ray as Lovely
- Bhavna Pani as Janaki alias Jaanu
- Kumar Govind as Chakri, Raju's brother
- Srinath as Vishwanath, Raju's father
- Avinash as Chakri and Raju's coach
- Sharan as Kitti, Raju's friend
- Ramesh Bhat as Jaanu's father
- Balaraj as Sakshi Shivanand, Raju's friend
- Bullet Prakash as Raju's friend
- Dharma as Rohith
- Sanketh Kashi
- M. S. Umesh
- Mandeep Roy as professor
- Badri Narayan
- Sridhar Raj
- Niranjan Shetty
- Appu Venkatesh
- Rajeev Rathod
- Rocket Vikram

== Production ==
The film began its shoot on London on 15 May 2001. This was the first production venture of R. Srinivas who is a silk merchant while also worked as film distributor. Three song sequences were shot at London with a particular song featuring Shivarajkumar and Lisa Ray was shot at Hide Park, London Tower, and Buckingham Palace. The climax was shot at London for five days.

== Soundtrack ==
The music of the film was composed by Ramana Gogula and lyrics were written by K. Kalyan. The song "Missamma Kissamma" is based on "Bangala Kathamulo" from Telugu film Badri (2000). The songs "Chandana Siri" and "Monalisa" are based on "Gunthalakadi" and "Ramachilaka" from Telugu film Yuvaraju (2000), respectively. The other three songs were reused from Thammudu. The audio rights were bagged by Akash audio at the cost of 30 lakhs.

Yuvaraja

Soundtrack album by Ramana Gogula
- Released: 2001
- Recorded: 2001
- Genre: Feature film soundtrack
- Label: Akash Audio

All lyrics are written by K. Kalyan.

No.	Title	Singer(s)	Length
1.	"Missamma Kissamma"	Ramana Gogula, Nanditha
2.	"Bangalore Students"	Ramana Gogula
3.	"Monalisa Monalisa"	Ramana Gogula, Nanditha
4.	"Naajooku Naari"	Ramana Gogula
5.	"Chandana Siri"	S. P. Balasubrahmanyam
6.	"Look At My Face"	Ramana Gogula
