= Badri (2000 film) =

2000 Telugu-language romantic drama film

- Badri Movie Poster
- Directed by: Puri Jagannadh
- Written by: Puri Jagannadh
- Produced by: T. Trivikrama Rao
- Starring: Pawan Kalyan; Amisha Patel; Renu Desai
- Cinematography: Madhu Ambat
- Edited by: Marthand K. Venkatesh
- Music by: Ramana Gogula
- Production company: Vijaya Lakhshmi Movies
- Release date: 20 April 2000
- Running time: 158 minutes
- Country: India
- Language: Telugu

Badri is a 2000 Indian Telugu-language romantic action film written and directed by Puri Jagannadh in his directorial debut. The film stars Pawan Kalyan, Amisha Patel, Renu Desai and Prakash Raj. This film marks the South Indian debut of Amisha Patel. The film's music was composed by Ramana Gogula, which marks his second collaboration with Pawan Kalyan after Thammudu (1999).

The film became a super hit at the box office and made Pawan Kalyan a star. The film's dialogues and songs were huge hits with the youth. The dialogue “Nuvvu Nanda aithe nenu Badri Badrinath” and songs like “Ye Chikitha” and “Bangala Kathamlo” continued to be popular even after two decades. Puri Jagannadh later remade it in Hindi as Shart: The Challenge (2004).

== Plot ==
Badri is an ad agency director who is challenged by his fiancée, Vennela, who claims that no other girl on earth would probably love him more than Vennela does. Badri takes up the challenge immediately, where Vennela shows a beautiful girl named Sarayu and asks him to approach her. After a few meetings, Sarayu falls for Badri. However, Sarayu's brother Nanda, who is excessively fond and protective of Sarayu, wants to finish Badri since he knows that Badri and Vennela are destined for marriage. Everything goes well for Badri because he realizes his love for Sarayu and reunites with her after Vennela and Nanda's approval.

== Cast ==
- Pawan Kalyan as Badrinadh "Badri"
- Amisha Patel as Sarayu, Nanda's younger sister and Badri's wife
- Renu Desai as Vennela, Badri's ex fiancée
- Prakash Raj as Nanda Kishore "Nanda", Sarayu's elder brother
- Kota Srinivasa Rao as Badri's father
- Brahmanandam as Gangaraju
- Ali
- Kaushal Manda
- Mallikarjuna Rao as Manikantha
- M. S. Narayana as Chandra Mouli "C. M."
- Sangeetha as Badri's mother
- Rama Prabha as Vennela's grandmother
- Uttej
- Narsing Yadav
- Ironleg Sastri
- Tirupathi Prakash

== Production ==
Pawan Kalyan, already a successful actor with hits like Suswagatham (1998), Tholi Prema (1998), and Thammudu (1999), took a risk by working with new director Puri Jagannadh for Badri. The film was produced by T. Trivikram Rao, with its muhurtham shot being given a clap by Chiranjeevi.

The film employed a unique approach with its title cards, placing the names of the heroines first, followed by Prakash Raj, and then Pawan Kalyan, surprising the industry.

== Soundtrack ==
Badri

Film score by Ramana Gogula
- Released: 2000
- Genre: Soundtrack
- Length: 28:32
- Label: Aditya Music
- Producer: Ramana Gogula

Ramana Gogula chronology
Yuvaraju (2000)	Badri (2000)	Johnny (2003)

The music was composed by Ramana Gogula and it was released on Aditya Music. The song "Ye Chiquita" became one of the top songs almost for a year.

No.	Title	Lyrics	Singer(s)	Length
1.	"I am an Indian"	Jalees Sherwani	Ramana Gogula	5:13
2.	"Bangala Kathamlo"	Chandrabose	Ramana Gogula, Sunitha	4:37
3.	"Ye Chikita (Ye Chiquita)"	Veturi	Ramana Gogula, Sunitha	4:29
4.	"Vevvela"	Veturi	Ramana Gogula, Sunitha	4:23
5.	"Varamanti Manase"	Veturi	Ramana Gogula	5:07
6.	"Chali Pidugullo"	Veturi	Ramana Gogula, Sunitha	4:28
Total length:				28:32

== Reception ==
Badri initially received an indifferent response on its release day, but quickly turned into a blockbuster, helping to establish Puri Jagannadh as a director in Tollywood. The film went on to become a huge success, earning over ₹18 crore as distributor share.

== Legacy ==
The film became a blockbuster at the box office, and its dialogues and songs were huge hits with the youth. The dialogue "Nuvvu Nanda aithe nenu Badri Badrinath" and songs like "Ye Chikitha" and "Bangala Kathamlo" continued to be popular even after two decades.

Badri played a crucial role in expanding Pawan Kalyan's appeal from class audiences, who admired his earlier hits like Suswagatham, Tholi Prema, and Thammudu, to a broader mass audience. The film, especially the intense scenes between Pawan Kalyan and Prakash Raj, remains a significant highlight in Pawan's career and continues to resonate in discussions about mass cinema.
