= Premante Idera =

- Theatrical poster
- Directed by: Jayanth C. Paranjee
- Written by: Paruchuri Brothers (dialogues)
- Story by: Deenaraj
- Produced by: Burugupalli Siva Ramakrishna; K. Ashok Kumar
- Starring: Venkatesh; Preity Zinta; Srihari
- Cinematography: Jayanan Vincent
- Edited by: Marthand K. Venkatesh
- Music by: Songs: Ramana Gogula; Score: Raj
- Production company: Sri Lakshmi Venkateswara Art Films
- Release date: 30 October 1998
- Running time: 168 minutes
- Country: India
- Language: Telugu

Premante Idera (transl. This is love) is 1998 Indian Telugu-language romantic drama film directed by Jayanth C. Paranjee, and produced by Burugupalli Siva Rama Krishna and K. Ashok Kumar under the Sri Lakshmi Venkateswara Art Films banner. The film stars Venkatesh and Preity Zinta (in her Telugu film debut), with music composed by Ramana Gogula, in his first composition.

Premante Idera was commercially successful and the music album was a chartbuster. The film won Nandi Award for Best Cinematographer for Jayanan Vincent. It was remade in Kannada as O Premave (1999) with Ravichandran.

== Plot ==
Murali and his friends go to a village to attend their friend's marriage. There Murali meets a girl Sailu, the bridegroom's friend, they begin to have fun and join in with the festivities and Murali is captivated by her attitude and beauty. Soon both fall in love, but Murali soon finds out that she is to be married to a police officer Muralidhar.

Murali puts on a brave face for the ceremony but hopes that something or someone will be able to stop the ceremony. He does everything he can to stop the marriage, he even tries to convince Sailu's joint family. Finally, the movie ends with the approval of Venktramayya for their marriage.

== Cast ==
- Venkatesh as Murali
- Preity Zinta as Sailaja "Sailu" (Voice dubbed by Shilpa)
- Ranganath as Venkatramayya
- Satyanarayana as Sailu's grandfather
- Srihari as Muralidhar
- Brahmanandam as Avadhani
- Ali as Ram Pandu
- Chandra Mohan as Subba Rao
- Giri Babu as Murali's father
- Prasad Babu as Suryam
- Narra Venkateswara Rao as Satyam's father
- Raghunatha Reddy as Murali's Uncle
- Maharshi Raghava as Murali's brother
- Sivaji Raja as Satyam
- Sivaji as Sivaji
- Prasanna Kumar
- Naveen as Sarath
- Gadiraju Subba Rao
- Lakshmi as Murali's mother
- Rama Prabha as Subbammatta
- Sana as Sailu's aunt
- Rajitha as Sailu's aunt
- Bangalore Padma as Satyam's mother
- Madhurima Sundersen as Lakshmi
- Harika as Murali's sister-in-law
- Neelima
- Tarangini as Sailu's friend
- Madhu Mani as Sailu's friend
- Vajja Venkata Giridhar as Murali's friend

== Soundtrack ==
Premante Idera

Film score by Ramana Gogula
- Released: 1998
- Genre: Soundtrack
- Length: 32:17
- Label: Aditya Music
- Producer: Ramana Gogula

Ramana Gogula chronology
Premante Idera (1998)	Thammudu (1999)

Music composed by Ramana Gogula. Music was through released Aditya Music Company.

Telugu

No.	Title	Lyrics	Singer(s)	Length
1.	"Nizam Babulu"	Chandrabose	Mano, Swarnalatha	4:32
2.	"Nalo Unna"	Sirivennela	S. P. Balasubrahmanyam, K.S.Chithra	4:43
3.	"Vayasa Chusuko"	Sirivennela	S. P. Balasubrahmanyam, K.S.Chithra	4:59
4.	"Manase Edhuru"	Sirivennela	S. P. Balasubrahmanyam, K.S.Chithra	4:49
5.	"Emo Ekkadundho"	Sirivennela	S. P. Balasubrahmanyam, K.S.Chithra	2:12
6.	"O Meri Bul"	Chandrabose	Ramana Gogula	5:10
7.	"Bombai Bomma"	Chandrabose	Ramana Gogula	4:10
8.	"Theme Music"	Instrumental	Ramana Gogula	1:01
Total length:				32:17

Tamil — Dubbed Version (as Naesikkiren)

All lyrics are written by Palani Bharathi.

No.	Title	Singer(s)	Length
1.	"Raja Rajanin"	Mano, Swarnalatha	4:32
2.	"Kaadhal Undhan Perai"	S. P. Balasubrahmanyam, Sujatha	4:43
3.	"Naesikkiren Unnai Naan"	S. P. Balasubrahmanyam, Swarnalatha	4:59
4.	"Manasil"	S. P. Balasubrahmanyam, Sujatha	4:49
5.	"Yengo Yenkiruntho"	S. P. Balasubrahmanyam	2:12
6.	"O Meri Bul Bul Thara"	Suresh Peters	5:10
7.	"Pallakku"	Mano, Ganga	4:10
8.	"Theme Music"	Ramana Gogula	1:01
Total length:			32:17

Hindi — Dubbed Version (as Dulhan Dilwale Ki)

All lyrics are written by Deepak Chaudhary.

No.	Title	Singer(s)	Length
1.	"Hai Dil"	Kumar Sanu, Anuradha Paudwal	4:51
2.	"O Mere Bulbul Tara"	Sonu Nigam	5:16
3.	"Dulhan Dilwale Ki"	Udit Narayan, Preeti Uttam Singh	4:11
4.	"Jaana Jaana Jeena"	SP Balasubramaniam, Anuradha Paudwal	4:44
5.	"Dulhe Ki Saali"	SP Balasubramaniam, Preeti Uttam Singh	4:34
6.	"Deewane Tujhe"	SP Balasubramaniam, Anuradha Paudwal	4:58
Total length:			28:38

== Reception and box office ==
Rakesh P of Deccan Herald called the storyline "trite", but the film "still manages to capture young hearts, for it's shot in a free-wheeling and fluid fashion". Manjula Kumar of The Indian Express wrote "Good performances, breathtaking shots of New Zealand and scintillating music by Ramana Gogula are plus points". The film had collected a distributors' share of ₹8.5 crore in its complete theatrical run.

== Awards ==
- 1998: Nandi Award for Best Cinematographer - Jayanan Vincent
