= Annavaram (film) =

- Directed by: Bhimaneni Srinivasa Rao
- Screenplay by: Bhimaneni Srinivasa Rao
- Dialogues by: Abburi Ravi
- Story by: Perarasu
- Based on: Thirupaachi (Tamil)
- Produced by: N. V. Prasad; Paras Jain; R. B. Choudary (presenter)
- Starring: Pawan Kalyan; Asin; Sandhya; Siva Balaji
- Cinematography: Sethu Sriram
- Edited by: Gautham Raju
- Music by: Songs: Ramana Gogula; Score: Dhina
- Production company: Megaa Super Good Films Pvt. Ltd
- Distributed by: Sri Venkateswara Creations; Super Good Films; Usha Pictures
- Release date: 29 December 2006
- Running time: 174 minutes
- Country: India
- Language: Telugu

Annavaram is a 2006 Indian Telugu-language action drama film directed by Bhimaneni Srinivasa Rao and stars Pawan Kalyan, Asin and Sandhya in the lead roles. Mega Super Good Films produced the film. The film is a remake of Tamil film Thirupaachi (2005). The film was released on 29 December 2006. It was a moderate success at the box office. It also marked Asin's last Telugu film, to date.

== Plot ==
Annavaram is a blacksmith living in a remote village, where he has a beloved sister named Varam. As he seeks a groom for Varam, he encounters numerous humorous incidents. Annavaram confides in his friend Narasimha that he wishes for his sister to live in a good city after her marriage. When a city suitor proposes to Varam, Annavaram agrees to the match and accompanies the newlyweds to Hyderabad. There, he falls in love with Aishwarya after a series of mishaps.

During his time in Hyderabad, Annavaram saves a court witness from Tappas Balu, a notorious don who controls central Hyderabad. He also discovers Gutkha Pandu, a local don who rules northern Hyderabad and disrupts Varam's husband's canteen business. In a confrontation at Golconda Fort, Narasimha is murdered by Puranapool Ganga, Gutkha Pandu's elder brother, who dominates southern Hyderabad. Varam's husband advises Annavaram to leave Hyderabad for his sister's happiness. After Narasimha's funeral, Annavaram departs his hometown, claiming he has secured a job at a cloth manufacturing company, but in reality, he embarks on a mission.

Annavaram, using the alias "Pothuraju," begins his crusade by killing 20 of Ganga's henchmen and a corrupt sub-inspector who works for Ganga. He warns Ganga that he will be the next target and threatens to eliminate all the dons in Hyderabad, criticizing the police department's failure to act. Annavaram's friend, Sairam, a police inspector, learns of his plan and is challenged by Annavaram to apprehend at least one thug to stop him. Sairam fails and loses his son, who is killed by Balu.

Motivated by this tragedy, Sairam assists Annavaram by detailing the entire mafia network in Hyderabad, specifying the leaders of various territories. Annavaram writes down their names and randomly selects Balu as his first target.

Balu receives a letter from Pothuraju threatening his life within 24 hours. Seeking protection, Balu approaches ACP J. D. Yadav, who refuses, criticizing Balu's previous harassment of the public. Balu retaliates by kidnapping Yadav's daughter, demanding that Yadav stop Pothuraju. Disguised as a wounded man, Annavaram is captured by Balu's henchmen and reveals his identity in front of Balu. He kills Balu and his henchmen, declaring his actions as "slaying of demons," and rescues Yadav's daughter.

Aishwarya meets Annavaram at the temple and discovers that he is not employed at a cloth manufacturing company. Annavaram convinces her that he works in a travel agency, and she extracts a promise from him to visit her frequently.

Annavaram then targets Gutkha Pandu, challenging him to save himself. Pandu hides in a politician's residence, and the politician damages his own property to deceive the police into providing security. Annavaram uses this distraction to infiltrate the politician's house, where he kills Pandu with the help of a crowd rallying against a fictitious financier.

ACP Yadav questions the rally participants about Pothuraju's identity, but they refuse to divulge information, feeling Annavaram is doing the police's job. Yadav's daughter, saved by Pothuraju, also refuses to reveal his identity.

Annavaram announces his plan to kill Ganga on 31 December, sending him a coffin and funeral posters. Enraged, Ganga beats his wife and seeks protection from a large group of thugs. Annavaram orchestrates a confrontation between the police and the mafia, disguising himself as a police inspector and infiltrating Ganga's fortress. With Sairam's help, Annavaram tricks the thugs by using a disguised dead thug to provoke a police assault.

As the New Year approaches, Annavaram stabs Ganga and throws him from a window, escaping before the police realize the ruse. The police celebrate the New Year, oblivious to Annavaram's actions. Finally, Aishwarya welcomes Annavaram, along with Varam and her husband, after he completes his mission.

== Cast ==
- Pawan Kalyan as Annavaram alias Pothuraju
- Asin as Aishwarya
- Sandhya as Varalakshmi "Varam."
- Lal as Puranapool Ganga
- Ashish Vidyarthi as Tappas Balu
- Siva Balaji as Varam's husband
- Brahmanandam as Purohitudu
- Sunil as Raju
- Ali as Malayali Priest
- Nagendra Babu as ACP J. D. Yadav IPS
- Suman Setty as Bujji
- Venu Madhav as Narasimha
- Bramhaji as Inspector Sairam
- Bhargavi as Seetha
- Tanikella Bharani as Lallu
- Mallikarjuna Rao as Prasad
- M. S. Narayana
- Telangana Shakuntala as Narasimha's mother
- Ravi Babu as Police Inspector
- Hema as Ganga's wife
- Surekha Vani as Yadav's wife
- Mounica as Yadav’s daughter
- Ranganath as Police commissioner
- Dharmavarapu Subramanyam as Minister Gottam Sathyam
- Raghu Babu as Ganga's henchman
- Ponnambalam as Ganga's henchman
- G. V. Sudhakar Naidu as Balu's henchman
- Besant Ravi as Ganga's henchman
- C. V. L. Narasimha Rao
- L. B. Sriram
- Chittajalu Lakshmipati as MLA Chenchu Ramaiah
- Uttej
- Narsing Yadav as Ganga's henchman

== Production ==
The muhurat shot of the film took place on 15 December 2005 at Annapoorna Studios with Chiranjeevi and Venkatesh attending as guests.

== Music ==
Ramana Gogula composed music for the film. The album was launched in stores on 14 December 2006. One bit song, "Aa Devudu Naakosam," was reused from "Enna Thavam" from the original film, but was rendered in Telugu by Chithra.

Annavaram

Studio album by Ramana Gogula
- Released: 14 December 2006 (India)
- Genre: Feature film soundtrack
- Label: Aditya Music
- Producer: Ramana Gogula

Ramana Gogula chronology
Chinnodu (2006)	Annavaram (2006)	Yogi (2007)

No.	Title	Singer(s)	Length
1.	"Raakshasa Raajyam"	Shankar Mahadevan
2.	"Lucia"	Ramana Gogula
3.	"Jarra Soodu"	Tippu
4.	"Neevalle Neevalle"	Kalyani
5.	"Annayya Annavante"	Mano & Ganga
6.	"Aa Devudu Naakosam"	K. S. Chithra & Ramana Gogula

== Release ==
Idlebrain opined, "The plus points of the film are Pawan Kalyan, sentimental scenes with sister and the killing strategies in the second half. On the flip side, the direction of the film is old-fashioned". Rediff called the film "watchable".
