= Yogi (2007 film) =

2007 Indian Telugu film by V. V. Vinayak

- Film poster
- Directed by: V. V. Vinayak
- Written by: Rajendra Kumar (dialogues)
- Story by: Prem
- Based on: Jogi
- Produced by: P. Ravindranath Reddy
- Starring: Prabhas; Nayanthara; Sharada; Kota Srinivasa Rao; Pradeep Rawat; Ali
- Cinematography: Sameer Reddy
- Edited by: Gautham Raju
- Music by: Songs: Ramana Gogula; Score: Gurukiran
- Release date: 14 January 2007
- Running time: 155 minutes
- Country: India
- Language: Telugu
- Box office: ₹25 crore

Yogi is a 2007 Indian Telugu-language action drama film directed by V. V. Vinayak, starring Prabhas, Nayanthara and Sharada. This film is a remake of the 2005 Kannada film Jogi by Prem. It also features Ali, Subbaraju, Pradeep Rawat and Kota Srinivasa Rao in the supporting roles. Ramana Gogula composed the music for V. V. Vinayak's Lakshmi, also composed music for this film.

The film was released on 12 January 2007. The film was later dubbed in Malayalam under the same title, in Hindi as Maa Kasam Badla Loonga and in Tamil as Murattu Thambi. It opened up to mixed to negative reviews, comparing unfavorably with the original, although with praise towards the cast’s performances, but criticism for its dull screenplay and sad ending, thus underperforming at the box office, despite a good opening, grossing over only ₹25 crore.

== Plot ==
Eeswar Chandra Prasad is the son of Ram Murthy and Santhamma. Murthy wants his son to get a job. However, Santhamma pampers Eeswar so much that he doesn't want to leave the village. When Murthy dies, Eeswar goes to the city to earn money to fulfill his father's last wish, following the advice of his friend Basha, a pickpocket. However, Eeswar cannot find Basha.

Meanwhile, Kotayya runs a big land mafia in Hyderabad and is a bitter rival of Narsing Pahilwan. Saidulu, Narsing's brother, attacks Kotayya and his assistant, but Eeswar accidentally saves them. Eeswar then gets a job at a tea stall run by Chandranna. He earns money, buys two gold bangles for his mother, and plans to leave the city. However, Narsing humiliates Eeswar for saving Kotayya and damages his mother's gold bangles. Infuriated, Eeswar kills Narsing and becomes the city's most feared goon.

Santhamma arrives in Hyderabad as Eeswar becomes a notorious figure. Kotayya tries to recruit Eeswar, but to no avail. Chandranna encourages Eeswar, now known as Yogi, to stay in the city to protect the poor from goons. Yogi becomes a terror for the goons. Kotayya and Saidulu then join forces to kill Yogi. However, during the attempt, Yogi kills Saidulu.

Nandini, a woman completing her practicals, is also after Yogi for an interview and eventually falls in love with him. Although Yogi and Santhamma live in the same city, they cannot meet. One day, Yogi meets Basha, who reveals that he saw Santhamma.

Though Basha and Santhamma go to the address, they cannot find Eeswar because he is known as Yogi. Santhamma waits for her son in front of a temple, as Basha tells her that Yogi visits the temple every Monday. However, Eeswar does not show up on Monday, fearing an attack by Saidulu's men. Santhamma dies in front of the temple, and Basha arranges her funeral. Yogi arrives but fails to recognize his mother's covered face and helps with the cremation expenses. He places flowers on his mother's body, unaware it is her until it is moved to the fire cabin. Basha arrives too late to explain. Yogi realizes the truth only after Nandini shows him his mother's belongings. The film ends with this emotional scene.

== Cast ==
- Prabhas as Eeswar Chandra Prasad alias Yogi
- Nayanthara as Nandini, Yogi's love interest
- Sharada as Santhamma, Yogi's mother
- Kota Srinivasa Rao as Kotayya "Goddesu", the main villain
- Pradeep Rawat as Narsing Pahilwan, Kotayya's opposition (guest appearance)
- Subbaraju as Saidulu, Narsing's brother
- Ali as Basha, Yogi's friend
- Chalapathi Rao as Ram Murthy, Yogi's father
- Giri Babu as Rama Chandra Murthy, Yogi's friend
- Chandra Mohan as Chandranna, Yogi's supporter
- Fish Venkat as Yogi's henchman
- Ahuti Prasad as jailer
- Devaraj
- Rajan P. Dev as Narsing's father
- Venu Madhav as Nandini's uncle
- M. S. Narayana
- Bandla Ganesh
- Raghu Karumanchi
- Prabhas Sreenu
- Uttej as Drunkard
- Shankar Melkote as Journalism Professor
- Sunil as Ramu (Cameo appearance)
- Mumaith Khan in item number "Orori Yogi"

== Production ==
The film's title was speculated to be Basava. Two songs were shot in Canada. One song was shot in Egypt.

== Music ==
Yogi (Telugu Version)

The film has six songs composed by Ramana Gogula. The music of the film was launched on 15 December 2006. A hexa platinum disc function took place at Ramappa Temple on 29 December 2006.

Telugu Tracklist
No.	Title	Singer(s)	Length
1.	"Dolu Baja"	Shankar Mahadevan
2.	"Oororo Yogi"	Karthik, Sunitha
3.	"Ye Nomu Nochindo"	Suresh
4.	"Gilli Gichi"	Rajesh Krishnan, Ganga
5.	"Nee Illu Bangaram"	Tippu, Sunitha
6.	"Gana Gana Gana"	Adnan Sami, Sudha

Malayalam Tracklist
No.	Title	Singer(s)	Length
1.	"Kuvalathil Malatharam"	Madhu Balakrishnan
2.	"Kalakalakala"	Jassie Gift, Sheela Mani
3.	"Poramo Yogi"	Vidhu Prathap, Jyotsna Radhakrishnan
4.	"Eda Kothiyaa"	Afsal, Manjari
5.	"Sivapoojakal"	Biju Narayanan
6.	"Neeyallo"	Vidhu Prathap, Preetha

== Reception ==
The film opened to mixed reviews. A critic from Rediff.com wrote that "When the director says, 'the feel never ends,' he was probably right. This is a ridiculously sentimental flick not worth wasting money at all".

== Box office ==
Yogi collected a distributor's share of ₹13.12 crore in its opening week, but the film finally ended up as a commercial failure.
