= Shyam Palav =

Indian cinematographer

Shyam Palav is an Indian cinematographer. He came into recognition with his work for the Telugu film Johnny (2003) starring Pawan Kalyan.

== Career ==
He started his career working as the assistant cameraman for the film Gehrayee. Later he started his work as a cinematographer. He was known for his work in cinematography for the Telugu film Johnny.

== Johnny ==
Palav's work was not recognised, though he has done films like Peechha Karro and Yeh Hai Jalwa, which stars Salman Khan. His work was very much praised when he got a chance in Pawan Kalyan's movie Johnny. Palav and Chota K. Naidu handled the Cinematography for Johnny. Johnny's cinematography was praised for the colour and theme used.

== Filmography as cinematographer ==
- Johnny (2003)
- Yeh Hai Jalwa (2002)
- Peechha Karro (1988)

== Filmography as cameraman ==
- Gehrayee (1980)
