= Bhoomigeetha =

- Directed by: Kesari Haravu a.k.a. Kesari Haravoo
- Screenplay by: Kesari Haravu a.k.a. Kesari Haravoo
- Produced by: R Mahadeva Gowda, Geetha Mahadeva Gowda, H K Narakesari
- Cinematography: B.V. Surendranath Begur
- Edited by: K Balu
- Music by: Ilayaraja; K. Kalyan (lyrics)
- Release date: 1997
- Running time: 144 minutes
- Country: India
- Language: Kannada

Bhoomigeetha (transl. Song of the earth) is a 1997 Indian Kannada language film, starring Atul Kulkarni and Vinaya Prasad.

== Plot ==
A tribal community faces cultural and ecological displacement when a dam is constructed in their native land.

== Cast ==
- Lokesh as Lingaiah
- Vinaya Prasad as Sumathi
- Atul Kulkarni as Forest officer
- Manju Bhashini as Obi
- Umesh as Jogi

== Soundtrack ==
Soundtrack was composed by Ilayaraja.

- Nodiravva - Sunitha
- Goro Gorokana - S. P. B. Charan
- Goro Gorokana - P. Unnikrishnan
- Are kamali - Sunitha, S. P. B. Charan
- Bhoodyaviya - Ilayaraja, Napoleon, Sunitha
- Aa Devarili - Ilayaraja

== Awards ==
45th National Film Awards

- Best Film on Environment Conservation/Preservation — R. Mahadeva Gowda, Geetha Mahadeva Gowda, H. K. Narakesari

1997–98 Karnataka State Film Awards

- Special Film of Social Concern – R. Mahadeva Gowda, Geetha Mahadeva Gowda, H. K. Narakesari

1997 Screen Awards

- Best Film – R. Mahadeva Gowda, Geetha Mahadeva Gowda, H. K. Narakesari
- Best Director (Kannada) — Kesari Haravu
