= Pandu (2005 film) =

- Movie poster with old title
- Directed by: Devi Prasad
- Written by: Satish Vegesna (dialogues)
- Screenplay by: Devi Prasad
- Story by: Devi Prasad
- Produced by: M L Kumar Chowdhary
- Starring: Jagapathi Babu; Sneha; Madhu Sharma
- Cinematography: Kantheti Satish
- Edited by: Nandamuri Hari
- Music by: Mani Sharma
- Production company: Sri Keerthi Creations
- Release date: 4 November 2005
- Running time: 140 minutes
- Country: India
- Language: Telugu

Pandu is 2005 Indian Telugu-language romantic comedy film, produced by M L Kumara Chowdhary on Sri Keerthi Creations banner and directed by Devi Prasad. Starring Jagapathi Babu, Sneha and music composed by Mani Sharma.

== Plot ==
The film begins with Anjali, a TV anchor and a classical dancer whose aim is to win the trophy in the National Dance Festivals. Pandu, a jack of all trades, resides in a colony where diverse people stay together, and everyone admires him. Once Pandu witnesses the generosity of Anjali, he adores her ideologies and becomes a hardcore fan. From there, he is behind her as White on Rice and is an admiration that pesters her and misconstrues him as a scapegrace. Meanwhile, Home Minister Bhagawan, scandalous malice, was invited as Chief Guest to Anjali's concert, where he lecherous her. Bhagawan confesses and terror-stricken her when she spits on him. Hence, Bhagawan's acts of vengeance incriminate Anjali in drug trafficking case through her friends Rahul & Shilpa. Moreover, no one gets for her succor except Pandu, as he knows Anjali's righteousness.

Right now, he schemes intellectually, sends his friend Sundari, a petty thief, into prison, and seeks the actuality. Thus, enraged Pandu challenges Bhagawan to prove Anjali not guilty. Firstly, he acquits her on parole utilizing his wit when she discerns his code of behavior and starts liking him. The next, Pandu targets Bhagawan, who needles, loathes the fame, and makes his life futile. Though Anjali selects for the competitions, she shows apathy. Here, Pandu boosts her courage and prepares for finals. Eventually, he acquits Anjali as innocent, brings out the devilish shade of Bhagawan, and dethrones him. So, infamed Bhagawan attacks Anjali while she is proceeding to contest and breaks her leg. Pandu rescues her, ceases Bhagawan, and successfully takes Anjali to the auditorium. At that point, Anjali stands up by the willpower given by Pandu and acquires the victory. At last, Anjali proclaims on stage that her entire success has been acknowledged at Pandu's feet and proposes to him. Finally, the movie ends on a happy note with the marriage of Pandu & Anjali.

== Cast ==
- Jagapati Babu as Pandu
- Sneha as Anjali
- Madhu Sharma as Sundari
- Sayaji Shinde as Bhagawan
- Dharmavarapu Subrahmanyam as Bhagawan's brother-in-law
- M. S. Narayana as Watch Vaaliswara Rao
- Kondavalasa as Anjaneyulu
- Krishna Bhagavaan as Harishchandra
- Raghu Babu as Lawyer
- Venu Madhav as Sunnunda
- Prudhviraj as Police inspector
- Radha Kumari as Pandu's grand mother
- Gundu Hanumantha Rao as Psychiatrist
- Gundu Sudharshan as Musician
- Fish Venkat as Bhagawan's henchman
- Sameer as Rahul
- Jyothi as Shilpa
- Hema Sundar as CM
- Chandra Mouli as Courier Boy
- Kallu Krishna Rao
- Meesala
- Junior Relangi

== Production ==
The muhurat of the film took place on 5 May 2005. The film's title was changed from That Is Pandu to Pandu. A few songs were shot in Malaysia.

== Soundtrack ==
Pandu

Film score by Mani Sharma
- Released: 2005
- Genre: Soundtrack
- Length: 23:08
- Label: Aditya Music
- Producer: Mani Sharma

Mani Sharma chronology
Jai Chiranjeeva (2005)	Pandu (2005)	Ranam (2006)

Music composed by Mani Sharma. Music released on ADITYA Music Company.

No.	Title	Lyrics	Singer(s)	Length
1.	"Vennelona"	Sai Sriharsha	Sunitha	4:33
2.	"Jabilipayina"	Suddala Ashok Teja	Mallikarjun, Kousalya	5:19
3.	"Acham Acham"	Sai Sriharsha	Tippu, Kalpana	4:27
4.	"Nagamani"	Bhaskarabhatla	Karthik, Kalpana	4:35
5.	"Poojalanduko"	Venegella Rambabu	Karthik	4:43
Total length:				23:08
