= Mounamelanoyi =

- Official poster
- Directed by: Syam Prasad
- Written by: Syam Prasad; Saikrishna (dialogues)
- Produced by: JM Joshi; Mahesh Rathi
- Starring: Sachin; Sampada Vaze
- Cinematography: Vasu
- Music by: Ramana Gogula
- Production company: Manisha Multimedia Arts
- Release date: 25 April 2002
- Country: India
- Language: Telugu

Mounamelanoyi (transl. Why the silence?) is a 2002 Indian Telugu-language romantic drama film directed by Shyam Prasad and starring Sachin and Sampada Vaze. The film's title is based on the song of the same name from Sagara Sangamam (1983).

== Cast ==
- Sachin as Bobby
- Sampada Vaze as Mounika
- Devan as Mounika's father
- Chalapathi Rao as Mounika's uncle
- Tanikella Bharani as Mounika's uncle
- Sivaji Raja as Mounika's uncle
- Kavitha as Mounika's mother
- Annapurna as Mounika's aunt
- Delhi Rajeswari as Mounika's aunt
- Sri Lakshmi as Mounika's aunt
- Saraswathamma as Mounika's grandmother
- M. S. Narayana as Lecturer
- Ali as Srinu
- Babloo as Bobby's friend
- Baby Nitya as Mounika's sister
- Aditi Govitrikar (special appearance in the song "Dancheti Ammalakkalalo")
- Rajyalakshmi Roy (special appearance in the song "Idi Benaras")

== Production ==
Sachiin Joshi made his debut with this film. He landed the role through producer Hamid Bhai. To learn his dialogues, Sachin wrote his dialogues in English.

== Soundtrack ==
All lyrics are written by Veturi, Ramana Gogula; all music is composed by Ramana Gogula.

Track listing
No.	Title	Singer(s)	Length
1.	"O Priyurala"	Ramana Gogula, Priya
2.	"Krishnaveni Teeramlo"	Ramana Gogula
3.	"Dancheti Ammalakkalalo"	Ramana Gogula, Priya
4.	"Vayyari Nadakalu"	Ramana Gogula
5.	"Idi Benaras"	Priya
6.	"Preme Ganamaye"	Ramana Gogula

== Reception ==
A critic from The Hindu wrote that "Shyamprasad handles the subject well by making the visuals speak for themselves". A critic from Full Hyderabad wrote that "The direction is decent enough as the movie manages to pull through despite the maddening silence".
