= Ko Ko =

2012 Indian film directed by R. Chandru

- Directed by: R. Chandru
- Produced by: Bhasker; Adhi
- Starring: Srinagar Kitty; Priyamani; Srihari
- Cinematography: K. S. Chandrashekar
- Music by: Ramana Gogula
- Release date: 13 January 2012
- Country: India
- Language: Kannada

Ko Ko...Koli Kothi is a 2012 Kannada romantic film genre starring Srinagar Kitty and Priyamani in the lead roles. R. Chandru is e director, Ramana Gogula the music director and Bhaskar and Adhi the producers under Bharani films.

== Cast ==
- Srinagar Kitty as Kitty
- Priyamani as Cauvery
- Srihari as Sri Hari Prasad
- Anu Prabhakar
- Harshika Poonachha
- Sanjjana
- Praveen
- Rangayana Raghu
- Sadhu Kokila
- Bullet Prakash
- Ravi Kale
- Honnavalli Krishna
- Mithra
- Raju Talikote
- Kuri Prathap

== Soundtrack ==
The audio soundtrack was released on 7 December 2011 at the Bell Hotel in Bangalore. Ramana Gogula has composed 6 songs and Kaviraj has written lyrics for 5 of them.

Ko Ko

Soundtrack album by Ramana Gogula
- Released: 7 December 2011
- Genre: Feature film soundtrack
- Label: Ananda Audio Video

No.	Title	Lyrics	Singer(s)	Length
1.	"Aakasmika Geleyanu"	Kaviraj	Kunal Ganjawala, Shreya Ghoshal
2.	"Government College"	Sanju	Ramana Gogula
3.	"Mellane"	Kaviraj	Karthik, Sunitha
4.	"Labaa Labaa Labaa"	Kaviraj	Kailash Kher, Chaitra H. G.
5.	"Naa Kolluve"	Kaviraj	Ramana Gogula, Sunitha
6.	"Kitti Bhaava"	Kaviraj	Gurukiran, Chaitra H. G.

== Reception ==
=== Critical response ===
A critic from The New Indian Express wrote "Priyamani looks apathetic towards her assignment but excels in dance sequences. Sanjana too showed off her moves. Bullet Prakash, as a prospective groom, has the potential to make your funny bones tickle. Music director Ramana Gogula has done a neat job. It is worth a watch provided you have the patience". Shruti I. L. from DNA wrote "He tickles your funny bone right from the beginning. Popular musician Ramana Gokula has scored the music. But none of his songs linger on. Ko Ko is your mundane commercial potboiler. It brings with it a few twists and turns but it’s not too long before you figure out what’s awaiting you at the end of the road".
