= Thammudu =

1999 Indian Telugu film

- Theatrical release poster
- Directed by: P. A. Arun Prasad
- Based on: Jo Jeeta Wohi Sikandar by Mansoor Khan
- Written by: Chintapalli Ramana (dialogues)
- Screenplay by: P. A. Arun Prasad
- Story by: P. A. Arun Prasad
- Produced by: Burugupalli Siva Ramakrishna
- Starring: Pawan Kalyan; Preeti Jhangiani; Aditi Govitrikar
- Cinematography: Madhu Ambat
- Edited by: Marthand K. Venkatesh
- Music by: Ramana Gogula
- Production company: Sri Venkateswara Art Films
- Release date: 15 July 1999 (India)
- Running time: 162 minutes
- Country: India
- Language: Telugu
- Box office: est.₹9.46 crore (share)

Thammudu (transl. Younger Brother) is a 1999 Indian Telugu-language sports action film written and directed by P. A. Arun Prasad. The films stars Pawan Kalyan, Preeti Jhangiani, and Aditi Govitrikar. Bhupinder Singh, Achyuth, Brahmanandam, Ali, and Kitty play supporting roles. Thammudu was produced by Burugupalli Sivaramakrishna under the Sri Venkateswara Art Films banner. The music is composed by Ramana Gogula with cinematography by Madhu Ambat and editing by Marthand K. Venkatesh. Thammudu was inspired by the 1979 American film Breaking Away.

The film released on 15 July 1999 and went on to become a blockbuster with the film's soundtrack by Ramana Gogula becoming a trendsetter. The film was remade in Tamil as Badri (2001), in Kannada as Yuvaraja (2001) and in Bengali as Champion (2003).

== Plot ==
Subramanyam aka Subbu aka Subhash is the youngest son of a family. He is a wastrel and gypsy and spends his days roaming around with girls, hanging around with his friends, and constantly failing his exams. Subbu's behaviour always shows hatred and contempt towards his father, Viswanadh, who is a cafe owner. Subbu's elder brother, Chakri, on the other hand is a college level kickboxer and Viswanadh's favourite son. Chakri spends his days rigorously training for the inter college kickboxing championship, but ends up losing to his kickboxing arch rival, Rohit, who is from the elite Model College. While training, he and Rohit end up running into each other and Chakri always is shamed for his poor background as Chakri attends Government College. Jaanu aka Janaki is Subbu's neighbor and a garage owner's daughter. She is secretly in love with Subbu. Subbu is unaware that Jaanu is in love with him. He usually considers her as a friend and a source of money and cars to impress girls and constantly borrows money and cars.

One day, Subbu meets Lovely, who is a rich college girl from the elite Model College and falls in love with her. He impresses her by lying to her that he attends the elite Engineering College and a wealthy man's son. Subbu is actually from the local government college just like his brother Chakri. Lovely falls for his lies and soon begins to express her love to Subbu. Eventually, she learns the truth and breaks up and insults Subbu in front of Viswanadh and Chakri. At the same time, Viswanadh finds out that Subbu has taken large amounts of money from Jaanu. Fatigued, he scolds Subbu and banishes him.

Subbu is now homeless and gets support from Jaanu. Jaanu tells Subbu that he should be more responsible of himself and prove himself towards his father. He begins to reform himself and soon starts to understand Jaanu's love for him. In the meantime, Chakri is attacked and seriously injured by Rohit, who now happens to be Lovely's new boyfriend and Subbu's enemy, and his friends causing Chakri to be hospitalized. This rules him out of the final match of the inter college kick boxing championship. Deciding to seek revenge for his brother's accident and redeem himself in front of Viswanadh's eyes, Subbu trains and works really hard to prepare for the inter college kickboxing championship. He trains by breaking pots and cars go over his hand to make them hard. He defeats Rohit in the kickboxing match and wins the final intercollege kickboxing championship, dedicates the trophy to Chakri, redeems himself to Visnwanadh, and finally accepts Jaanu's love.

== Cast ==
- Pawan Kalyan as Subramanyam / Subhash a.k.a. Subbu
- Preeti Jhangiani as Janaki 'Jaanu'
- Aditi Gowitrikar as Lovely
- Bhupinder Singh as Rohit
- Achyuth as Chakri, Subbu's elder brother
- Brahmanandam as Telugu lecturer Avadhanalu
- Ali as Kodandarama Manoharan
- Kitty as Viswanadh, Subbu's and Chakri's father
- Chandra Mohan as Kutumba Rao, Jaanu's father
- Vennira Aadai Moorthy as Lecturer
- Tanikella Bharani as Drunkard
- Mallikarjuna Rao as Malli
- Venu Madhav as Subbu's friend
- Varsha as Shanthi
- Ironleg Sastri as Malli's matchmaker
- Surya as Surya
- Dominic Chung as Chinese boy/Sparring partner
- Raghunatha Reddy

== Production ==
Thammudu was inspired by the 1979 American film Breaking Away and is a remake of the 1992 Hindi film Jo Jeeta Wohi Sikandar.

== Soundtrack ==
Thammudu

Film score by Ramana Gogula
- Released: 1999
- Genre: Soundtrack
- Length: 34:13
- Label: Aditya Music
- Producer: Ramana Gogula

Ramana Gogula chronology
| Premante Idera (1998) | Thammudu (1999) | Yuvaraju (2000) |

Music composed by Ramana Gogula.

Track listing
| No. | Title | Lyrics | Singer(s) | Length |
|---|---|---|---|---|
| 1. | "Made in Andhra" | Chandra Bose | Ramana Gogula | 6:57 |
| 2. | "Pedavi Datani" | Sirivennela Sitarama Sastry | Ramana Gogula, Sunitha | 4:36 |
| 3. | "Edola Vundi" | Surendra Krishna | Ramana Gogula | 5:10 |
| 4. | "Vayyari Bhama" | Sirivennela Sitarama Sastry | Ramana Gogula | 5:16 |
| 5. | "Travelling Soldier" | Ramana Gogula | Ramana Gogula | 4:27 |
| 6. | "Kalakalu" | Chandra Bose | S. P. Balasubrahmanyam | 5:11 |
| 7. | "College Blues" | | Ramana Gogula | 1:15 |
| 8. | "Thati Chettu" | | Pawan Kalyan | 1:21 |
| 9. | "Em Pilla Maatadava" | | Pawan Kalyan | 1:57 |
| Total length: | | | | 36:10 |

== Reception ==
Deccan Herald wrote, "While the first half is full of fun-frolic situations, the second half of the movie brims with heart-wringing moments" but criticized the dubbing of film's actresses and called Ramana Gogula's score "Finger-snapping and peppy".

=== Box office ===
Thammudu, released on 15 July 1999, became another sensational success for Pawan Kalyan, who was already popular due to hits like Suswagatham and Tholi Prema. It had a theatrical business of ₹4.5–5.2 crore and collected a distributor share of ₹9.25–9.46 crore, emerging as a blockbuster. Thammudu resulted in a profit of over ₹4 crore for buyers and also became the second-highest-grossing film in the Nizam region after Choodalani Vundi (1998).

== See also ==
- List of boxing films
