= Chinnodu =

2006 film

- Release Poster
- Directed by: Kanmani
- Written by: Kanmani
- Produced by: Katragadda Lokesh; C.V Srikanth
- Starring: Sumanth; Charmy Kaur; Rahul Dev; Chandra Mohan; Rajiv Kanakala; Brahmanandam
- Cinematography: Jaswanth
- Edited by: Kotagiri Venkateswara Rao
- Music by: Ramana Gogula
- Release date: 27 October 2006
- Country: India
- Language: Telugu

Chinnodu is a 2006 Indian Telugu-language film directed by Kanmani. It stars Sumanth and Charmy Kaur in the lead roles while Rahul Dev, Chandra Mohan, Rajiv Kanakala, and Brahmanandam play supporting roles. It was remade in Kannada as Hara (2014).

== Plot ==
Chinna is born in jail to a mother who dies during childbirth. The jailer Pashupati feels sorry for Chinna and adopts him. He brings up Chinna along with his son Sanjay and daughter. However, Pashupati's father never acknowledges Chinna since he was born to a prisoner. In an ensuing episode, Chinna kills Pashupati's brother and is jailed. Upon release, Pashupati and his family tell Chinna to stay away from them. Chinna moves into a rough neighborhood that happens to be under the control of the local mafia. He overpowers the mafia and becomes a protector for the local people, while trying to make amends with his foster family. Despite Chinna's efforts, they mistreat him as he's a criminal, with the exception of Pashupati's wife, who is kind to Chinna for some reason. Anjali, a clerk in the police commissioner's office, enters as a co-tenant into Chinna's house. She falls in love with Chinna. However, she mistakenly assumes that Chinna is a soft-natured guy and is unaware of his reputation and murderous past. Their relationship breaks when Anjali finally discovers the truth about Chinna. In the end, it was revealed that Pasupathi's wife accidentally killed Pashupathi's brother and Chinna took the blame to protect her. After learning this truth, Pasupathi's family apologized to Chinna for mistreating him and welcome him back into the family, reuniting him with Anjali as well.

== Cast ==
- Sumanth as Chinna
- Charmy Kaur as Anjali
- Rahul Dev as Srisailam
- Chandra Mohan as Jailer Pashupati, Chinna's father
- Rajiv Kanakala as Sanjay
- Venu Madhav as Venu, Chinna's friend
- Brahmanandam as Appalaraju / Pappalaraju
- Ali as Ram Prasad
- Babloo Prithiveeraj as Ranga, Srisailam's brother-in-law
- Sivaji Raja as Pashupati's younger brother
- Ramaraju
- Vinaya Prasad as Janaki, Pashupati's wife and Chinna's mother
- Raghu Babu as Raghu, Srisailam's henchman

== Production ==
After directing a "non-commercial film on artistic lines" with Naa Oopiri, Kanmani directed Chinnodu on a "mass scale."

== Soundtrack ==
The music was composed by Ramana Gogula and released by Aditya Music.

Chinnodu

Soundtrack album by Ramana Gogula
- Released: 13 October 2006
- Recorded: 2006
- Genre: Soundtrack
- Length: 21:39
- Label: Aditya Music
- Producer: Ramana Gogula

Ramana Gogula chronology
Aapthudu (2005)	Chinnodu (2006)	Lakshmi (2006)

Track list
No.	Title	Lyrics	Singer(s)	Length
1.	"Masodu Leste"	Kandikonda	Ramana Gogula	4:32
2.	"Hey Manasa"	Suddala Ashok Teja	Venu, Sunitha	4:13
3.	"Kannullo Merisave"	Kandikonda	Tippu, Tanya	4:23
4.	"Ye Mulla Teegallo"	Suddala Ashok Teja	Nanditha	4:35
5.	"Mila Mila"	Kandikonda	Jassie Gift, Nanditha	3:56
Total length:				21:39

== Reception ==
A critic from Rediff.com rated the film 2 1/2 out of 5 and wrote that "Chinnodu is for those who like action, but it is Sumanth who steals the show". Jeevi of Idlebrain.com called the film "average".
