= Relax (film) =

Indian social thriller film

- DVD cover
- Directed by: Pradeep C Shetty
- Produced by: D Manjusri Reddy; Papi Reddy; N Varadan
- Starring: Rohan; Anjali
- Cinematography: T Rajendra
- Edited by: K Ram Gopal Reddy
- Music by: Ramana Gogula
- Production company: California Media Group
- Release date: 25 February 2005
- Country: India
- Language: Telugu

Relax is a 2005 Indian Telugu-language social thriller film directed by Pradeep C Shetty and starring Rohan and Daisy Bopanna (credited as Anjali).

== Cast ==
- Rohan as Sandeep
- Daisy Bopanna as Anjali
- Vijayachander as Sharma
- Subbaraju as Veerendra
- Brahmanandam as Aavalu
- Ali as Ram Nepal Varma
- M. S. Narayana as 'Tehelka' Subba Rao
- Jayaprakash Reddy as a police officer
- Prudhvi Raj as Bose

== Soundtrack ==
The music was composed by Ramana Gogula. Pawan Kalyan attended the film's audio launch.

== Reception ==
Jeevi of Idlebrain.com opined that "The producers should be appreciated for selecting a novel storyline. But substandard execution marred the prospects of the film". B. Anuradha of Rediff.com wrote that "Debutant director Pradeep Shetty's offbeat film included a rare mix of comedy with astrology. It is based on a 'different' story amid routine romantic Telugu movies, and the makers should be lauded for betting on such a concept". Ravi Kalaga of Full Hyderabad said that "Relax combines astrology with modern philosophy to weave a tale astutely as to how someone with an in-depth knowledge of prediction can change the destinies of many. But unfortunately, the producers and the director forgot to predict their own destinies after this blunder".
