= Lakshmi (2006 film) =

2006 Telugu film by V. V. Vinayak

- Theatrical poster
- Directed by: V. V. Vinayak
- Screenplay by: V. V. Vinayak
- Story by: Siva Akula
- Produced by: Nallamalapu Srinivas (Bujji)
- Starring: Venkatesh; Nayanthara; Charmme
- Cinematography: Chota K. Naidu
- Edited by: Gautham Raju
- Music by: Songs: Ramana Gogula; Background Score: Mani Sharma
- Production company: Sri Lakshmi Narasimha Productions
- Release date: 14 January 2006
- Running time: 161 minutes
- Country: India
- Language: Telugu
- Budget: ₹12 crore
- Box office: est. ₹20–22 crore

Lakshmi is a 2006 Indian Telugu-language action drama film directed by V. V. Vinayak and produced by Nallamalapu Srinivas (Bujji). The film stars Venkatesh, Nayanthara, and Charmme. The music was composed by Ramana Gogula, with cinematography by Chota K. Naidu. The film was a blockbuster at the box office and also marked Nayanthara's Telugu debut.

The film was remade in Indian Bengali in 2007 as Sangharsha and in Bangladeshi Bengali in 2008 as Pita Matar Amanot.

== Plot ==
Lakshmi Narayana, the managing director of Lakshmi Group of Companies, is the eldest son in a family of two brothers and two sisters. He is strict in disciplining his younger brothers, ensuring they live up to their late father's expectations, even resorting to physical punishment when they stray. He owns a factory worth hundreds of crores, where Sailaja, one of his employees, harbours feelings for him.

Janardhan, a former employee of Lakshmi Industries accused of forgery, seeks revenge by sowing discord within Lakshmi's family. He arranges for Lakshmi’s sister to marry his nephew, a fact that is only revealed after the wedding. This leads to tensions within the family, culminating in Lakshmi disclosing that he and his youngest sister were adopted after being orphaned and mistreated by their relatives. His younger brothers, manipulated by Janardhan, turn against him, resulting in Lakshmi and his sister being expelled from their home. Only his other sister and the factory workers stand by him. Lakshmi begins working in his own factory as a regular labourer and moves into a modest home with his sister, later joined by their mother.

Meanwhile, it is revealed that Lakshmi was once in love with Nandini, the niece of his foster father. Their relationship was disrupted when she was harassed by the son of Rayudu, a powerful Kolkata-based don. Lakshmi severely injures the man in self-defense, putting him in a phobia and inciting Rayudu's wrath, while Nandini is put to a coma. Janardhan calls Rayudu and informs him about Nandini's whereabouts. To exact revenge against him, Janardhan accuses Lakshmi of stealing a million rupees from the company. But the workers unite and pay it together to prove their loyalty to Lakshmi. Lakshmi's mother leaves the house and warns her sons to leave Janardhan otherwise they would suffer. Janardhan hatches a plot to kill Lakshmi's entire family and Rayudu hatches a plot to kill Lakshmi as killing him would eliminate his son's fear of him. Nandini wakes up from coma after hearing Rayudu's son's voice. The doctor, who is the prospective groom of Lakshmi's younger sister informs her about Nandini's abduction. Lakshmi reaches the factory and thrashes Rayudu's goons. In a plan to weaken Lakshmi through sentiment, Janardhan shows Lakshmi's brothers tied to a pole. Lakshmi saves them by untying the rope but they tie him to the pole stating that they need the property, not him. Rayudu shows his son with Nandini. In a plot to destroy Lakshmi's family, he hits Lakshmi's brothers. Lakshmi unties himself and kills Rayudu, his son and Janardhan. Lakshmi's brothers ask him to return home and Lakshmi accepts it. The family is reunited.

== Cast ==
- Venkatesh as Lakshmi Narayana
  - Manoj Nandam as Adolescent Lakshmi
    - Master Teja as Young Lakshmi
- Nayanthara as Nandini
- Charmme as Sailaja "Sailu"
- Pradeep Rawat as Rayudu, a don
- Sayaji Shinde as Janardhana Rao
- Brahmanandam as Sattar (Guest role)
- Sunil as Suresh
- Jayabharathi as Lakshmi's mother
- Ranganath as Lakshmi's father
- Uma as Lakshmi's sister
- Sharwanand as Lakshmi's brother
- Rajiv Kanakala as Lakshmi's brother
- Sameer as Lakshmi's brother-in-law
- Sudha as Nandini's mother
- Telangana Shakuntala as Shakuntala
- Venu Madhav as Tiger Satti
- Ahuti Prasad as doctor
- Chalapathi Rao
- Jenny
- L. B. Sriram as Sivayya
- Naramalli Sivaprasad
- Chatrapathi Sekhar as Bujji
- Satya Prakash as Charminar Babji
- Fish Venkat as Babji's henchman
- Rajendran as Babji's henchman
- Raghu as Satti's buddy
- Rajitha
- Sanjay as Dr. Lokesh

== Production ==
Jyothika was initially signed as the female lead but declined the role due to her marriage preparations. She was subsequently replaced by Nayanthara. The film was officially launched on 24 August 2005. A fight sequence was filmed at Gachibowli factory, while two songs were shot in New Zealand.

== Soundtrack ==
Lakshmi

Film score by Ramana Gogula
- Released: 2006
- Genre: Soundtrack
- Length: 25:28
- Label: Aditya Music
- Producer: Ramana Gogula

Ramana Gogula chronology
| 'Relax' (2005) | Lakshmi (2006) | 'Seetaramudu' (2006) |

Music for the film was composed by Ramana Gogula and was released on Aditya Music audio label. The soundtrack was released on 18 December 2005 at Taramati Bandari.

| No. | Title | Lyrics | Singer(s) | Length |
|---|---|---|---|---|
| 1. | "Dhaga Dhaga" | Vishwa | Ramana Gogula, Ganga | 4:19 |
| 2. | "Taara Taluku Taara" | Chandrabose | Raju, Sunitha | 4:11 |
| 3. | "Hey Satyabhama" | Chandrabose | Shankar Mahadevan, Sudha | 4:01 |
| 4. | "Ammayi Andhra Mirchi" | Kulasekhar | Tippu, Shreya Ghoshal | 4:31 |
| 5. | "Ne Puttindi Neekosame" | Kulasekhar | Rajesh Krishnan, Ganga | 4:44 |
| 6. | "Hey Satyabhama (remix)" | | Ramana Gogula |
| Total length: | | | | 25:28 |

== Reception ==
=== Critical reception ===
Indiaglitz gave the film 2 out of 5 stars and said, "V V Vinayak's direction is on safe lines. He keeps to the linear path, without taking any chances. He knows whom he is catering to and delivers what he promised". Jeevi of idlebrain.com gave the film 3 out of 5 stars and said, "First half of the film is OK and the scenes before interval are good. The second half divulges into a entirely different flashback episode. There are certain good moments in the film and has got orientation towards masses and family crowds. However, the VV Vinayak could not blend in Venkatesh’s family image and Vinayak’s mass taking in a smooth way. The biggest advantage of this film is that Lakshmi is the only mass film for the entire season of Sankranthi which gives good market penetration in C and D centers as well in the first week itself".

In the 50 days of function at Eluru, the hero Venkatesh said, "The success of Lakshmi film encouraged me a lot. The success of the film go to the entire unit of Lakshmi. I am happy to have delivered many hits in my career spanning 20 years from Kaliyuga Pandavulu to Lakshmi. People started calling me Lakshmi Bava after the release of this film."

=== Box office ===
The film was released in 316 screens, including 284 from then Andhra Pradesh. The film collected Rs.8 crores in its opening week. Lakshmi collected around ₹22 crore according to Sify. It had a 50-day run in 215 centres. The film was dubbed in Tamil under the same title. The film had a 100-day run in 94 centres.

== Awards ==
- Venu Madhav won Nandi Award for Best Male Comedian for his role in this film.
