= Sunita =

Disciple of the Buddha

Sunita was a highly accomplished disciple of the Buddha. He was born in a family of untouchables whose job was of sweeping around the temple area. According to Thanissaro Bhikkhu's translation of the Theragāthā account, Sunīta laments:

"People found me disgusting,
despised me, disparaged me.
Lowering my heart,
I showed reverence to many."

Sunīta continues, describing his meeting with the Buddha and ordination:

The compassionate Teacher,
sympathetic to all the world, said:

"Come monk."

That was my formal Acceptance.

Sunīta practiced arduously and eventually became an Arahant. His status was acknowledged by the gods Brahmā and Śakra:

Then, as night was ending
& the sun returning,
Indra & Brahmā came to pay homage to me,
hands palm-to-palm at their hearts:

"Homage to you,
O thoroughbred of men,
Homage to you,
O man supreme,
whose effluents are ended.
You, dear sir,
are worthy of offerings."
