= Johnny (2003 film) =

2003 film by Pawan Kalyan

- Theatrical release poster
- Directed by: Pawan Kalyan
- Written by: Pawan Kalyan
- Produced by: Allu Aravind
- Starring: Pawan Kalyan; Renu Desai; Raghuvaran
- Cinematography: Chota K. Naidu; Shyam Palav
- Edited by: Yusuf Khan
- Music by: Ramana Gogula
- Production company: Geetha Arts
- Distributed by: K. A. D. Movies
- Release date: 25 April 2003
- Running time: 178 minutes
- Country: India
- Language: Telugu

Johnny is a 2003 Indian Telugu-language martial arts film written and directed by Pawan Kalyan. Produced by Allu Aravind, the film starred Pawan Kalyan in the title role, while Renu Desai, Raghuvaran, and Raza Murad played pivotal roles. The film revolves around a martial arts coach who decides to use his skills to earn prize money in competitions required to save his wife suffering from blood cancer.

The theatrical distribution rights of Johnny were sold for over ₹21 crore, the highest price ever for a Telugu film at the time. The film was released on April 25, 2003. It also became the first-ever Telugu film to be released with over 250 prints worldwide including the United States. The film was a disaster. It became the first flop in Pawan Kalyan's career after seven consecutive hits. The film was acknowledged for its stylish presentation and fight sequences, but the writing was criticised. Despite the film's commercial failure, its action choreography is considered to have set new standards in Telugu cinema reflecting a more grounded and believable approach to action. The film was screened at the International Film Festival of India.

== Plot ==
Johnny loses his mother when he was a kid. He runs away from his alcoholic father Ravishankar and dysfunctional family. Years later, from a small time club fighter, Johnny becomes a mixed martial arts coach. One day, a woman named Geetha lodges a police complaint on Johnny for beating up a man. Later, she discovers that it was a misunderstanding. Both become friends and eventually get married.

After marriage, Johnny finds out that his wife is suffering from leukemia. He relocates to Mumbai to pay for her medical treatment and finds himself in dire need to pay for the medical expenses. While competing at an amateur kickboxing competition, Johnny is bought out by the organizer Tatya for a lump sum offer to compete with two international martial artists. Johnny defeats them and earns a sum of ₹200,000 overnight, which he uses for Geeta's treatment.

== Cast ==
- Pawan Kalyan as Johnny Damle
  - Panja Vaisshnav Tej as Young Johnny
- Renu Desai as Geetanjali "Geeta" Damle, Johnny's wife
- Geetha as Johnny's mother and Ravi's first wife
- Raghuvaran as Ravishankar "Ravi" Damle, Johnny's father
- Lillete Dubey as Ravi's second wife and Johnny's stepmother
- Ali as Pathan Babu Lal
- Raza Murad (credited as Raja Murad) as Tatya
- Brahmaji as SI
- Mallikarjuna Rao as Appalraju alias Anthony
- M. S. Narayana as Lingam
- Surya as a goon who harasses women
- Satya Prakash as Karate Satti
- Harish Pai as Pandu
- Yaadi as Dayanand
- Aryan Khan (Parvez) as Nazir
- Shoaib as Laddu Yadav
- Usman as Mahesh
- Devi Charan as Chinna Ghouse

== Production ==
Jennifer Lopez was rumored to appear in the film.

== Soundtrack ==
The music for the film was composed by Ramana Gogula. The song "Ee Reyi Theyanadi" is based on the Chitti Chellelu (1970) song of the same name which itself was based on the French song L'amour est bleu (1967). A critic from Idlebrain.com in an audio review, "Overall, this album with 10 numbers in it calls in for a decent hearing".

Johnny

Soundtrack album by Ramana Gogula
- Released: January 1, 2003
- Recorded: 2002
- Genre: Feature film soundtrack
- Length: 30:33
- Label: Aditya Music

Ramana Gogula chronology
Mounamelanoyi (2002)	Johnny (2003)	Relax (2005)

No.	Title	Lyrics	Singer(s)	Length
1.	"Go Johnny"	Ramana Gogula	Ramana Gogula	1:21
2.	"Dojo Music"	—	Instrumental	3:42
3.	"Nuvvu Saara"	Masterji	Pawan Kalyan	1:57
4.	"Ravoyi Maa Country Ki"	Masterji	Pawan Kalyan	2:00
5.	"Dharmardha Kamamulalona"	Sirivennela Seetharama Sastry	Rajesh	1:03
6.	"Cool and Lovely"	Ramana Gogula	Ramana Gogula	2:18
7.	"Naaraz Kaakuraa"	Masterji	Ramana Gogula	5:08
8.	"Ee Reyi Theyanadi"	Sirivennela Seetharama Sastry	Hariharan & Nanditha	4:54
9.	"Ye Chota Nuvvuna"	Sirivennela Seetharama Sastry	Rajesh & Nanditha	4:08
10.	"Naalo Nuvokasagami"	Chandrabose	K. K. & Usha	4:04
Total length:				30:35

== Release ==
Johnny's worldwide distribution rights were sold for a record breaking amount of over ₹21 crore, the highest price ever for a Telugu film at the time surpassing the previous record of Chennakesava Reddy (2002), which was sold for ₹19.5 crore. It was sold for ₹7.5 crore in the Nizam region, ₹4.5 crore in Ceded and for ₹9 crore for the rest of Andhra Pradesh.

Johnny was released in over 310 theaters worldwide with digital print quality.

== Reception ==
The film was released to negative reviews. Gudipoodi Srihari of The Hindu wrote that "There seems to be more eccentricity than sense in the film directed by Pavan Kalyan. He also plays the title role of Johnny". Jeevi of Idlebrain.com rated the film one-and-a-half out of five stars and wrote that "One can watch this film with an academic interest to study how not to direct a film. This film has all style and no substance". A critic from Sify wrote that "On the whole Johnny lacks style, story or soul".

== Legacy ==
In 2003, Pawan Kalyan's styling from the film became a trend, with Johnny T-shirts, bandanas, armbands, and caps becoming very popular. Johnny is noted for its realistic and innovative action sequences, which were praised for their authenticity and integration into the storyline. Despite the film's commercial failure, its action choreography set new standards in Telugu cinema reflecting a more grounded and believable approach to action. The film's failure led Kalyan to move to more conventional, larger-than-life roles, impacting the innovation in his action sequences in subsequent films.
