= Ramana Gogula =

- Born: Ramana Gogula; 13 June
- Origin: India
- Genre: Film Music
- Occupations: VP Innovation, Stanley Black & Decker, Music Composer, Singer/Song Writer, Music Producer, Entrepreneur, Venture Capitalist
- Years active: From 1995

Ramana Gogula is an Indo-American entrepreneur, venture capitalist, music composer and singer of film music and Indian pop. His notable film compositions include Premante Idera (1998), Thammudu (1999), Badri (2000), Johnny (2003), Lakshmi (2006), Annavaram (2006), Yogi (2007). He is known for his collaborations with Pawan Kalyan with whom he worked for four films.

He is currently the Vice President, Clean Technology Innovation at Stanley Black & Decker, Inc and a venture partner at Anthill Ventures.

== Early life and career ==
In 1996, his band Misty Rhythms released the Indie Pop studio album Aye Laila along with a music video which became a chart buster on major music channels MTV and Channel [V] in India. He then ventured into Telugu cinema and composed songs and background score for around 25 films predominantly in Telugu with a few films in Kannada and Tamil languages.

As an entrepreneur, Ramana Gogula founded startups like Liqwid Krystal in the education sector, and Earthen Glow that provides off-grid solar lighting to villages. He is also the Vice President, Clean Technology Innovation at Stanley Black & Decker, Inc and a venture partner at Anthill Ventures. He was also the managing director for South Asia for the MNC Sybase.

== Discography ==
=== As composer ===
Year	Title	Score	Songs	Language	Notes	Ref.
1998	Premante Idera	No	Yes	Telugu	Also playback singer	
1999	Thammudu	Yes	Yes	Telugu	Also playback singer	
2000	Badri	Yes	Yes	Telugu	Also playback singer	
2000	Yuvaraju	Yes	Yes	Telugu	Also playback singer	
2001	Yuvaraja	Yes	Yes	Kannada	Also playback singer	
2001	Badri	No	Yes	Tamil	Also playback singer	
2002	Mounamelanoyi	Yes	Yes	Telugu	Also playback singer	
2003	Johnny	Yes	Yes	Telugu	Also playback singer	
2003	Dham	Yes	Yes	Telugu	Also playback singer	
2004	Aaptudu	Yes	Yes	Telugu		
2005	Relax	Yes	Yes	Telugu	Also playback singer	
2006	Lakshmi	No	Yes	Telugu	Also playback singer	
2006	Chinnodu	Yes	Yes	Telugu	Also playback singer	
2006	Annavaram	No	Yes	Telugu	Also playback singer	
2007	Yogi	No	Yes	Telugu		
2007	Viyyalavari Kayyalu	Yes	Yes	Telugu	Also playback singer	
2009	Boni	Yes	Yes	Telugu	Also producer and playback singer	
2012	Ko Ko	Yes	Yes	Kannada	Also playback singer	
2013	1000 Abaddalu	Yes	Yes	Telugu	Also playback singer	
2013	Venkatadri Express	Yes	Yes	Telugu		

=== As playback singer ===
Year	Title	Song(s)	Language	Notes	Ref.
1998	Premante Idera	"O Meri Bulbul", "Bombai Prema"	Telugu		
1999	Thammudu	All songs except "Kalakalu", "Thati Chettu", and "Em Pilla Maatadava"	Telugu		
2000	Badri	All songs	Telugu		
2000	Yuvaraju	"Ramachilaka", "Olammo"	Telugu		
2001	Yuvaraja	All songs except "Chandana Siri"	Kannada		
2001	Badri	"Travelling Soldier", "Adi Jivunnu Jivunnu"	Tamil		
2002	Mounamelanoyi	All songs except "Idi Benaras"	Telugu		
2003	Johnny	"Go Johnny", "Naaraz Kakura"	Telugu		
2003	Dham	"Nelloru Nerajana", "Friendship"	Telugu		
2005	Relax	"Hey Cheli Manasulo"	Telugu		
2006	Lakshmi	"Masodu Leste"	Telugu		
2006	Chinnodu	"Dhaga Dhaga"	Telugu		
2006	Annavaram	"Lucia", "Aa Devudu Naakosam"	Telugu		
2007	Viyyalavari Kayyalu	"Surude Sare Annadu", "Hey Hand Some", "Neelala Neekallu" (English Remix)	Telugu		
2009	Boni	"Boni", "Boni" (Di Bi Daba)	Telugu		
2012	Ko Ko	"Government College", "Naa Kolluve"	Kannada		
2013	1000 Abaddalu	"Rumba Rumbaaba"	Telugu		
2025	Sankranthiki Vasthunam	"Godari Gattu"	Telugu	SIIMA Award for Best Male Playback Singer – Telugu	
2025	They Call Him OG	"Let's Go Johnny	Telugu		
2025	They Call Him OG	"Let's Go Johnny	Hindi (D)		

=== Studio albums ===
Year	Album	Tracks	Ref.
1996	Aye Laila	"Aye Laila" (Single)	
1996	Aye Laila	"Aye Pilla" (Single)	
1996	Aye Laila	"Voices From A Stone"	
1996	Aye Laila	"Hey Mama"	
1996	Aye Laila	"Tears For Allah"	
1996	Aye Laila	"Big Blue Eyes"	
1996	Aye Laila	"Sumeiya"	
1996	Aye Laila	"Cuckoo"	
1996	Aye Laila	"Dance Of Shiva"	
1996	Aye Laila	"Broken Hearts"	
1996	Aye Laila	"Dancing Raindrops"	
1996	Aye Laila	"Maria"	
1996	Aye Laila	"Far Far Away"	
