= Shilpa =

- Gender: Female
- Language: Hindi; Sanskrit

Origin
- Meaning: "sculpture" "statue" "work of art"
- Region of origin: India

Other names
- Related names: Silpa

Shilpa (Devanagari: शिल्पा) is an Indian feminine given name which means "sculpture", "statue" and "work of art".

== Notable people with the given name Shilpa ==
- Shilpa Anand (born 1982), Indian actress and model
- Shilpa Raju (born 1992), Indian singer
- Shilpa Rao (born 1984), Indian singer
- Shilpa Ray, American singer-songwriter
- Shilpa Saklani (born 1962), Indian actress
- Shilpa Shetty (born 1975), Indian actress and model
- Shilpa Shinde (born 1967), Indian actress
- Shilpa Shirodkar (born 1973), Indian actress
- Shilpa Shukla (born 1982), Indian actress
- Shilpa Singh (born 1990), Indian beauty pageant winner
- Shilpa Tulaskar (born 1957), Indian actress

== Notable people with the given name Silpa ==
- Silpa Bhirasri (1892–1962), Italian-Thai sculptor

== Notable people with the surname Silpa ==
- Mitch Silpa (born 1973), American writer, actor and director
