= Yuvaraju (2000 film) =

- Directed by: Y. V. S. Chowdary
- Written by: Y. V. S. Chowdary; Chintapalli Ramana
- Produced by: Burugapally Sivarama Krishna
- Starring: Mahesh Babu; Simran; Sakshi Sivanand
- Cinematography: Ajayan Vincent
- Edited by: Bulli Reddy
- Music by: Ramana Gogula
- Production company: Sree Venkateswara Art Films
- Release date: 14 April 2000
- Running time: 166 minutes
- Country: India
- Language: Telugu

Yuvaraju (transl. Prince) is a 2000 Indian Telugu-language romantic comedy action film directed and produced by Y. V. S. Chowdary. The film stars Mahesh Babu, Simran and Sakshi Shivanand in lead roles. The film was a box-office bomb.

== Plot ==
Srinivas has just returned to India and joins a college in Hyderabad. There, he meets his classmate Srivalli, a young beautiful girl with whom he falls in love. Srivalli has a childhood friend, Vamsi abroad, whom she regards as her best friend and keeps him close to her heart as when a plane crashed 20 years back, these two are the only survivors of the tragedy.

Finally Srinivas and Srivalli learn that they are in love with each other. They break the news followed by a lavish engagement ceremony. For the placid viewers then comes the excitement in the form of Srilata, who arrives in nick of time to attend the engagement. Srivalli learns that Srinivas and Srilata know each other since they met in abroad few years ago, from the brief observation at her engagement ceremony.

Srilata has a son named Teja whom Srinivas befriends. He learns that his father does not live with them. Later during an outing he Teja plays a tune which was taught to him by his mother saying it's his father's tune. Here Srinivas learns that Teja is his son.

He goes to Srilata who tells him during an outing years back, they were given a drink by the tribals and didn't remember what happened. She remembered three months later but couldn't find him. Now he wants to tell Srivalli the truth but Srilata makes him promise on his son's photo that he won't tell anything. Teja learns the truth. Both Srinivas and Teja come close during the days. Srinivas has afterthoughts about his marriage as he wants his son. Vamsi loves Srivalli and comes to the marriage to win her.

As the marriage day emerges Srilata can't bear to see the marriage, so she tries to leave. Teja wants to see his father before leaving. Srivalli learns the truth from a letter written by Teja. Srinivas tries to stop them at airport where they learn she has taken poison. Srivalli also arrives and they take her to hospital, and are attacked by rowdies. Later, Srinivas, Srilata and their son embark a trip.

== Cast ==
- Mahesh Babu as Srinivas "Sri"
- Simran as Srilatha
- Sakshi Sivanand as Srivalli
- Sajja Teja as Teja
- Sivaji as Sivaji
- Venkat as Vamsi
- Ali as Baba Sehgal
- Venu Madhav as Sehgal Baba
- Chandra Mohan
- Bandla Ganesh
- Varsha
- Ramya Sri as College lecturer
- AVS
- M. S. Narayana
- Baby Sri Divya as Kalpana

== Soundtrack ==
The soundtrack of this film was composed by Ramana Gogula, which was a hit. This album consisted of eleven tracks, including two instrumentals. Especially the songs "Guntalakidi", "Haira Debba", "Manesemo" and "Tholivalape" were hits. The lyrics were written by Veturi Sundara Rama Murthy.

Track Listing
No.	Title	Singer(s)	Length
1.	"Rama Chilaka"	Ramana Gogula	4:51
2.	"Manasemo"	Sunitha Upadrashta	4:08
3.	"Olammo"	Ramana Gogula, Nanditha	4:44
4.	"Nookalisthe"	Shankar Mahadevan, Nanditha	4:50
5.	"Haira Haira Debba"	K. S. Chithra, Udit Narayan	4:44
6.	"Tholivalape"	K. S. Chithra, Hariharan, Nanditha	4:32
7.	"Chandamama"	Anuradha Sriram, Sunitha	4:40
8.	"Gunthalakidi"	K. S. Chithra, S. P. Balasubrahmanyam	5:39
9.	"Twinkle Twinkle"	Ramana Gogula	0:56
10.	"Guitar Theme" (Freak Out Style)	Instrumental	1:18
11.	"Guitar Theme" (Emotional)	Instrumental	1:40

== Reviews ==
Idlebrain.com rated the film 3/5. fullhyd rated it 7/10. Telugucinema.com stated, "Movie has nothing new. An average movie".
