= Avunanna Kadanna =

2005 film by Teja

Avunanna Kaadanna
- Theatrical release poster
- Directed by: Teja
- Written by: Teja
- Produced by: Atluri Purnachandra Rao
- Starring: Uday Kiran; Sadha
- Cinematography: Sameer Reddy
- Edited by: Marthand K. Venkatesh
- Music by: R. P. Patnaik
- Production company: Lakshmi Productions
- Release date: 6 April 2005
- Country: India
- Language: Telugu

Avunanna Kaadanna (transl. Yes or No) is a 2005 Indian Telugu-language romantic drama film written and directed by Teja. The film stars Uday Kiran and Sadha.

== Cast ==
- Uday Kiran as Ravi
- Sadha as Aravinda (credited as Sadha)
- Krishna as Ramakrishna, Ravi's father
- Pilla Prasad as Mangaraju
- Dharmavarapu Subramanyam as Aravinda's Father
- Suman Shetty
- Rallapalli
- Sana
- Sudha
- Duvvasi Mohan
- Sangeeta
- Rama Prabha
- Shravya
- Nirmala Reddy
- Rajendra
- Rajababu

== Soundtrack ==
The music was composed by R. P. Patnaik.

All lyrics are written by Kulasekhar.

| No. | Title | Singer(s) | Length |
|---|---|---|---|
| 1. | "Avunanna" | R. P. Patnaik |
| 2. | "Gudigantala" | S. P. B. Charan, Usha |
| 3. | "Anaganaga" | KK, Usha |
| 4. | "Nelathalli" | Shankar Mahadevan |
| 5. | "Preminchanani" | Saandip, Usha |
| 6. | "Malinam" | Usha |
| 7. | "Suvvi Suvvi" | K. S. Chithra, Mallikarjun |

== Production ==
Sadha was chosen to make her second collaboration alongside Teja after Jayam. This film marks the third collaboration of Uday Kiran and Teja after Chitram and Nuvvu Nenu. Teja's frequent collaborator, R. P. Patnaik, was roped in to compose the music. The producer spent a good sum of money although he did not make money after Venky and Mr & Mrs Sailaja Krishnamurthy.

== Reception ==
The film released to positive reviews. A critic from Sify praised the performances of the lead actors and Dharmavarapu and stated how "On the whole, Teja tries his best with a sugar-coated love story that is fun to watch". A critic from Idlebrain.com gave the film three and of five stars and praised the performances of much of the cast and the first half of the film.
