= Putrudu =

Putrudu (Telugu: పుత్రుడు) in Telugu language means Son.

- Devi Putrudu is a 2001 Telugu film directed by Kodi Ramakrishna.
- Lakshmi Putrudu is a 2008 Telugu film.
