= Uday Kiran =

Indian film actor (1980-2014)

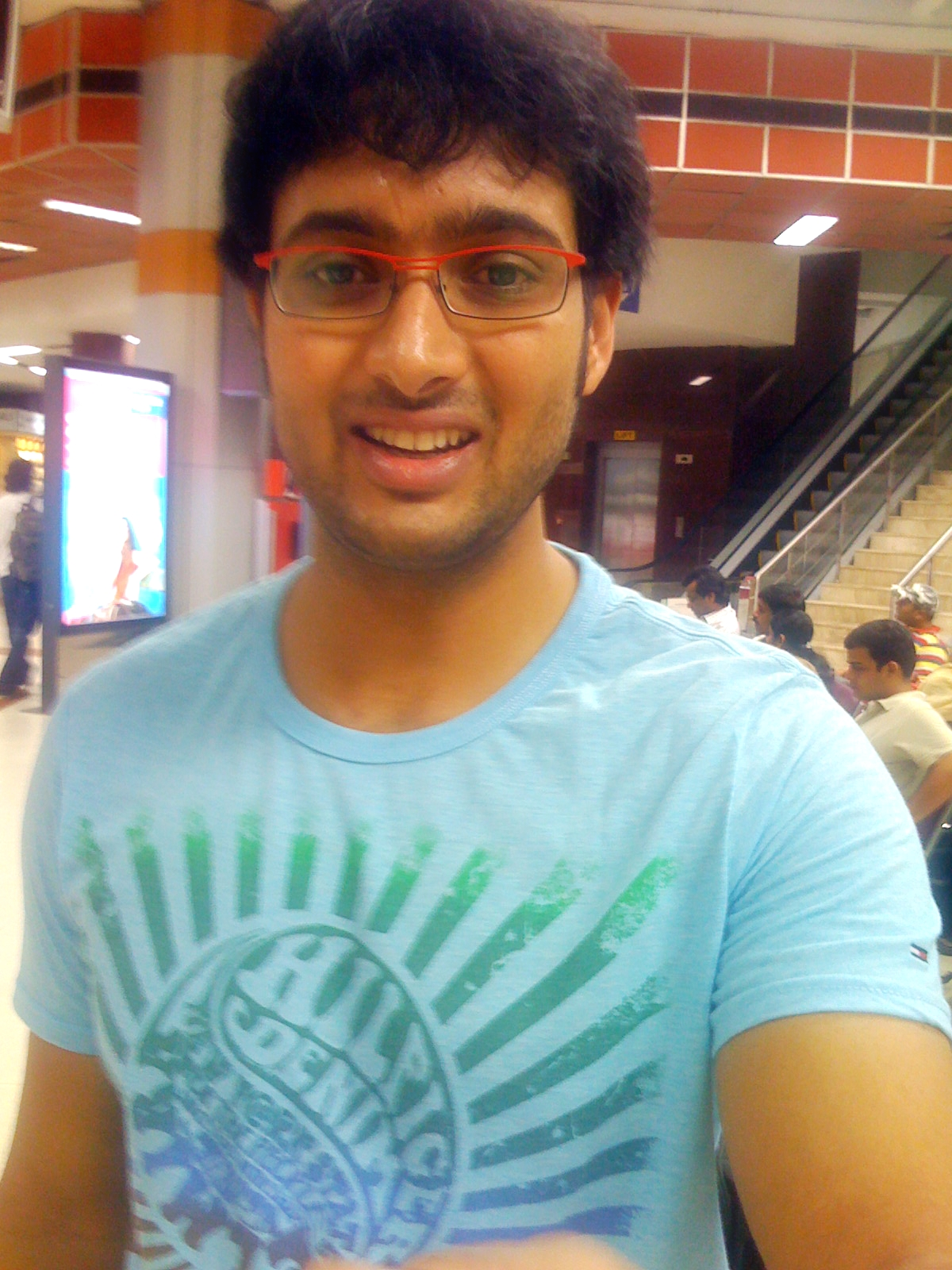
- Uday Kiran in 2009
- Born: Vajapeyajula Uday Kiran; 26 June 1980; Hyderabad, Andhra Pradesh, India (now in Telangana, India)
- Died: 5 January 2014 (aged 33); Hyderabad, Andhra Pradesh, India (now in Telangana, India)
- Occupation: Actor
- Years active: 2000-2013
- Notable credit(s): Chitram (2000); Nuvvu Nenu (2001); Manasantha Nuvve (2001); Nee Sneham (2002)
- Spouse: Vishitha (m. 2012)
- Website: fb.com/udaykiran.officialpage

Vajapeyajula Uday Kiran, better known as Uday Kiran (26 June 1980 – 5 January 2014) was an Indian actor who primarily worked in Telugu cinema and has acted in some Tamil films. His first three films, Chitram (2000), Nuvvu Nenu (2001), and Manasantha Nuvve (2001) were successful, earning him the title "Hat-trick Hero". The three films, all love stories, earned him a 'Lover Boy' image in the early 2000s. Even till today in social media, he is often referred to as "Evergreen Star".

In 2001, he won the Filmfare Award for Best Actor - Telugu for Nuvvu Nenu, and became the youngest winner in the category. Subsequently, he acted in successful romantic films Kalusukovalani (2002) and Nee Sneham (2002). He also starred in the films Sreeram (2002) and Avunanna Kadanna (2005).

In 2006, he made his Tamil debut with the film Poi, directed by veteran director K. Balachander. Most of his films post-2005 like Nuvvekkadunte Nenakkadunta (2012), Jai Sriram (2013) were not commercially successful. Uday Kiran died by suicide at his home in Hyderabad in January 2014.

== Early life ==
Vajapeyajula Uday Kiran was born in a Brahmin family on 26 June 1980 to Vajapeyajula K. Murthy and Nirmala of Vijayawada. He did his schooling from K V Picket School and graduated from Wesley Degree College, Secunderabad.

He had an elder brother and has an elder sister, Sridevi. His mother died in the year 2006. Singer Parnika is his maternal cousin.

== Career ==
Kiran started modelling while he was in college. He made his film debut in the Hinglish film Mysterious Girl (1999), which remained unreleased for a few years. In 2000, Kiran made his Telugu debut under his mentor, cinematographer turned film director Teja with the film Chitram, in which he played the 17-year-old lead character.

This film, followed by two other films, Nuvvu Nenu and Manasantha Nuvve, made him among the very few actors in Telugu cinema to deliver three consecutive successful films. His performance as a hot-blooded youngster in Nuvvu Nenu won him the Filmfare Best Actor Award (Telugu) in the year 2001.

In his fourth film, Kalusukovalani, he displayed his dancing skills through the songs, "Udayinchina" and "Cheliya Cheliya". In his fifth film, Sreeram, he ventured into an action-oriented story of a youngster aspiring to become a top cop. 2002 saw him in Nee Sneham, another blockbuster movie of that year for which he was nominated for Filmfare Best Actor Award (Telugu) for the second time.

In 2005, he ventured into Tamil with the film Poi directed by K. Balachander. He then did two more films, Vambu Sandai and Pen Singam in Tamil, the latter being the story penned by M. Karunanidhi; both of the films went unnoticed.

He made a comeback with Viyyalavari Kayyalu (2007) and Gunde Jhallumandi (2008). Kiran last appeared in the 2013 film Jai Sreeram. A reviewer from The Times of India wrote, "From being a chubby lover boy with dimples showing on his cheeks to a man with muscles, Uday Kiran has metamorphosed as an actor. Such is his complete transformation that one is tempted to draw parallels to Nana Patekar".

== Personal life ==
Kiran was engaged to Chiranjeevi's daughter Sushmitha in 2003, but the engagement was called off. He married Vishitha on 24 October 2012.

== Death ==
Kiran died on 5 January 2014 by suicide by hanging at his apartment in Srinagar Colony, Hyderabad. He was 33. No suicide note was found. The investigating Banjara Hills police suspected financial problems to be cause and a case of suspicious death was registered. Kiran had suffered from depression due to financial crisis for almost a year.

On 6 January 2014, Kiran's body was kept at the Andhra Pradesh Film Chamber of Commerce and several film personalities including Dasari Narayana Rao, D. Ramanaidu, Venkatesh, D Suresh Babu, Srikanth, Shivaji, Tanikella Bharani, Chalapathi Rao, Tammareddy Bharadwaja, (ex) MLA Jaya Sudha, Paruchuri Gopala Krishna, Paruchuri Venkateswara Rao, Shivaji Raja, Anup Rubens, Samadra, Kadambari Kiran, Sunil and Anita were among those who paid their last respects to the actor, before the body was taken to the cremation grounds. According to Andhra Pradesh Police, a young fan of Kiran allegedly committed suicide by hanging himself from a tree at Komatapalli junction in Bobbili sub-division in Vizianagaram.

== Filmography ==
Key
†	Denotes films that have not yet been released

- All films are in Telugu, unless otherwise noted.

Year	Title	Role	Notes
2000	Chitram	Ramana	Debut film
2001	Nuvvu Nenu	Ravi	
2001	Manasantha Nuvve	Chanti (Venu)	
2002	Kalusukovalani	Ravi	
2002	Sreeram	Sreeram	
2002	Holi	Kiran	
2002	Nee Sneham	Madhav	
2003	Neeku Nenu Naaku Nuvvu	Anand	Also playback singer for "Goal Goal"
2004	Love Today	Shiva	
2005	Avunanna Kaadanna	Ramu	
2006	Poi	Kamban	Tamil debut film; Dubbed in Telugu as Abaddam
2007	Viyyalavari Kayyalu	Vamsi	
2008	Vambuchanda	Prabhakaran	Tamil film; dubbed in Telugu as Lakshmi Putrudu
2008	Gunde Jhallumandi	Balraju (Rajesh)	
2008	Ekaloveyudu	Karthik	
2010	Pen Singam	Surya	Tamil film; dubbed in Telugu as Alladista
2012	Nuvvekaddunte Nenakkadunta	Hari	
2012	Mysterious Girl	Gautam	Hinglish film; released in Telugu as Jodi No.1 in 2003
2013	Jai Sreeram	Sriram Srinivas	
TBA	Chitram Cheppina Katha †	Karthik	Unreleased

== Awards ==
Filmfare Awards South

- 2001 – Best Actor – Nuvvu Nenu – Won
- 2002 – Best Actor – Nee Sneham – Nominated

AP Cinegoers Awards

- 2001 - Special Commendation jury award for best actor- Nuvvu Nenu
- 2002 - Special Jury award for best performance - Nee Sneham
