= Sarocharu =

- Theatrical release poster
- Directed by: Parasuram
- Written by: Parasuram
- Produced by: Priyanka Dutt
- Starring: Ravi Teja; Kajal Aggarwal; Richa Gangopadhyay; Nara Rohit
- Cinematography: Vijay K. Chakravarthy
- Edited by: Kotagiri Venkateswara Rao
- Music by: Devi Sri Prasad
- Production company: Three Angels Studio Pvt. Ltd.
- Distributed by: Blue Sky (Overseas)
- Release date: 21 December 2012
- Running time: 138 minutes
- Country: India
- Language: Telugu
- Budget: ₹260 million
- Box office: ₹570 million

Sarocharu (transl. Sir came) is a 2012 Indian Telugu-language romantic comedy film written and directed by Parasuram, starring Ravi Teja and Kajal Aggarwal in the lead roles. Richa Gangopadhyay played an imaginary role by combining the faces of Sandhya and Karthik's friend's wife (in the film). The film was produced on Three Angels Studio Pvt. Ltd. banner by Priyanka Dutt and was presented by Vyjayanthi banner. Devi Sri Prasad scored the soundtrack for the film. The film was released on 21 December 2012.

== Plot ==
Sandhya is a student who is madly in love with Karthik, a techie based in Italy. She decides to travel with him to India, confident that the travel time would be enough for her to get him to fall in love. Karthik reciprocates her gestures in a friendly way. However, he finally reveals that he is married to Vasudha but is waiting to seek divorce.

Sandhya learns about Karthik's stint in Subramaniapuram as a football coach and about his affair with Vasudha, and that he wants to divorce her because of incompatibility. She also realizes that despite all that baggage, she still has feelings for him. At this point, Karthik springs a surprise and reveals a shocking bit of information that he is not married and the story he narrated was his friend's and told it so that it should not repeat in their life as he loved her too. This infuriates her to the core and leaves him breaking in tears.

Into this comes in Gautham, Sandhya's brother-in-law who is madly in love with her. Based on her mother's suggestion, she agrees to marry Gautham. Gautham observes that she still loves Karthik and goes to talk with him. After a conversation, he realises the sincerity in Karthik's love. He lets Sandhya realize it and lets her go to him on their engagement day. Unfortunately, all goes vain as Sandhya knows that Karthik left to Ooty leaving her. Finally, she too goes to Ooty after three months and reunites with him.

== Cast ==
- Ravi Teja as Karthik
- Kajal Agarwal as Sandhya
- Richa Gangopadhyay as Vasudha
- Nara Rohit as Gautham
- Paruchuri Venkateswara Rao as Venkatachalam, Karthik's father
- Chandra Mohan as Chandram, Sandhya's father
- Delhi Rajeshwari as Snehalatha, Karthik's mother
- Jayasudha as Lakshmi, Sandhya's mother
- Brahmanandam as Krishna Murthy
- M. S. Narayana as Platinum Prasad
- Srinivasa Reddy as Karthik's friend
- Devan as Ravi Reddy, Vasudha's father
- Shanoor Sana as Latha, Vasudha's mother
- Ravi Prakash as Ravi
- Kalpika Ganesh as Kalpika
- Master Bharath as Vasudha's brother
- Chitram Srinu
- Prabhakar

== Production ==
=== Development ===
Parasuram, who directed Ravi Teja's Anjaneyulu directed the film and music director Devi Sri Prasad, who previously worked with Ravi Teja for Venky provided the music. Amala Paul and Trisha backed out of the project citing date issues paving the way for Kajal Aggarwal to bag the heroine role eventually. Richa Gangopadhyay eventually won the place of the second heroine in this film. The film was named "Sarosthara" but later it was changed to "Sarocharu" which was confirmed by Richa in her Twitter. This is the second film Ravi Teja is working with Kajal Agarwal after Veera and with Richa Gangopadhyay after Mirapakay. Nara Rohit, the nephew of the Chief Minister of Andhra Pradesh Nara Chandrababu Naidu, and veteran actors Jayasudha and Chandra Mohan hired for important roles. In November, a set of stills and 2 First Look Posters were Launched which got stunning response. It was also reported later that the pair of Ravi Teja and Kajal will be seen in a very beautiful romantic track that is expected to be a highlight of the movie.

=== Filming ===
Sarocharu, to be produced by Vyjayanthi Movies, will go on the floors from 16 June in Ooty but postponed to 1 July and again postponed to 8 July. The new schedule of the film started on 29 July 2012. In this flick, Ravi Teja plays the role of a Football Coach and Richa tweeted her character name to be Vasudha. After wrapping up a schedule in Ooty, the unit members flew to Italy and the film was shot for 12 days and later they moved to Germany to complete the schedule and there scenes Ft. Ravi Teja and Kajal Agarwal were shot. During the shooting of the schedule, it was reported that the film will be shot in exotic places of Italy and Switzerland. In the end of September 2012, The song "Racha Rambola" was shot in RFC, Hyderabad and it was reported that Richa is shaking leg along with Ravi Teja in the song and Richa loved the song. In November, it was declared that the film is in the last leg of shooting and except for a song, most part of the film has already been wrapped up. In the end of November, the shooting of the film was wrapped up. Leading distributors Blue Sky, who were associated with films like 100% Love, Gabbar Singh and Sri Rama Rajyam, purchased the overseas rights for an undisclosed price which is said to be the highest ever for Ravi Teja in overseas area.

== Soundtrack ==
Sarocharu

Soundtrack album by Devi Sri Prasad
- Released: 5 December 2012
- Recorded: 2012
- Genre: Film soundtrack
- Length: 21:07
- Language: Telugu
- Label: Aditya Music
- Producer: Devi Sri Prasad

Devi Sri Prasad chronology
Dhamarukam (2012)	Sarocharu (2012)	Alex Pandian (2013)

Producer Priyanka Dutt advised that Aditya Music purchased the audio rights and audio will be released through it for the film. The audio of the film was released directly into market without audio launch on 5 December 2012. Music of the film was composed by Devi Sri Prasad. The album consists of five songs. Lyrics for the two songs were penned by Ramajogayya Sastry and remaining songs were written by Srimani, Anantha Sreeram, Chandrabose. Devi Sri Prasad himself sung a song in the album.

=== Reception ===
The album has received a mixed response. Apherald.com gave a rating 2.5/5 for the album and stated that "Devi Sri Prasad’s magical tunes are missing to core in the audio of this film".

No.	Title	Lyrics	Singer(s)	Length
1.	"Made For Each Other"	Ramajogayya Sastry	Devi Sri Prasad	4:26
2.	"Jaga Jaga Jagadeka Veera"	Ramajogayya Sastry	Venu, Ranina Reddy	4:47
3.	"Raccha Rambola"	Srimani	Javed Ali, Rita	4:19
4.	"Gusa Gusa"	Anantha Sreeram	Sagar, Sunitha	3:37
5.	"Kaatuka Kallu"	Chandrabose	Khushi Murali, Narendra, Swetha Mohan, Chinnaponnu	3:58
Total length:				21:07

== Release ==
The film was cleared by Central Board of Film Certification on 19 December 2012. The film was released on 21 December 2012. The film was released in 450 screens worldwide. The film was also dubbed and released in Hindi as Jabardast Aashiq in 2016.

=== Critical reception ===
The film received mixed-to-positive reviews from critics. Karthik Pasupulate of The Times of India rated the film two out of five stars and wrote that "The music by Devi Sri Prasad is just as unremarkable as the rest of the movie. The writing, humor, editing and packaging all look too clichéd and to make matters worse there seems to me more philosophizing than any real romance. It all looks a little too daft in the end".

=== Box office ===
The film has collected a share of ₹127 million (US$1.3 million) in Andhra Pradesh in its first weekend. The film has collected $7,037 from 15 screens in the US in its second weekend and the per screen average is $469. The film has collected ₹3.13 million (US$33,000) in ten days in US. The film grossed ₹550 million (US$5.7 million) worldwide at the box office.

=== Home media ===
The VCD's, DVD's and Blu-rays of the film were released on 3 May 2013 with prices of $9.99 per DVD and $19.99 per Blu-ray through the manufacturer Bhavani DVD.
