= Teesha Nigam =

Indian playback singer (born 1991)

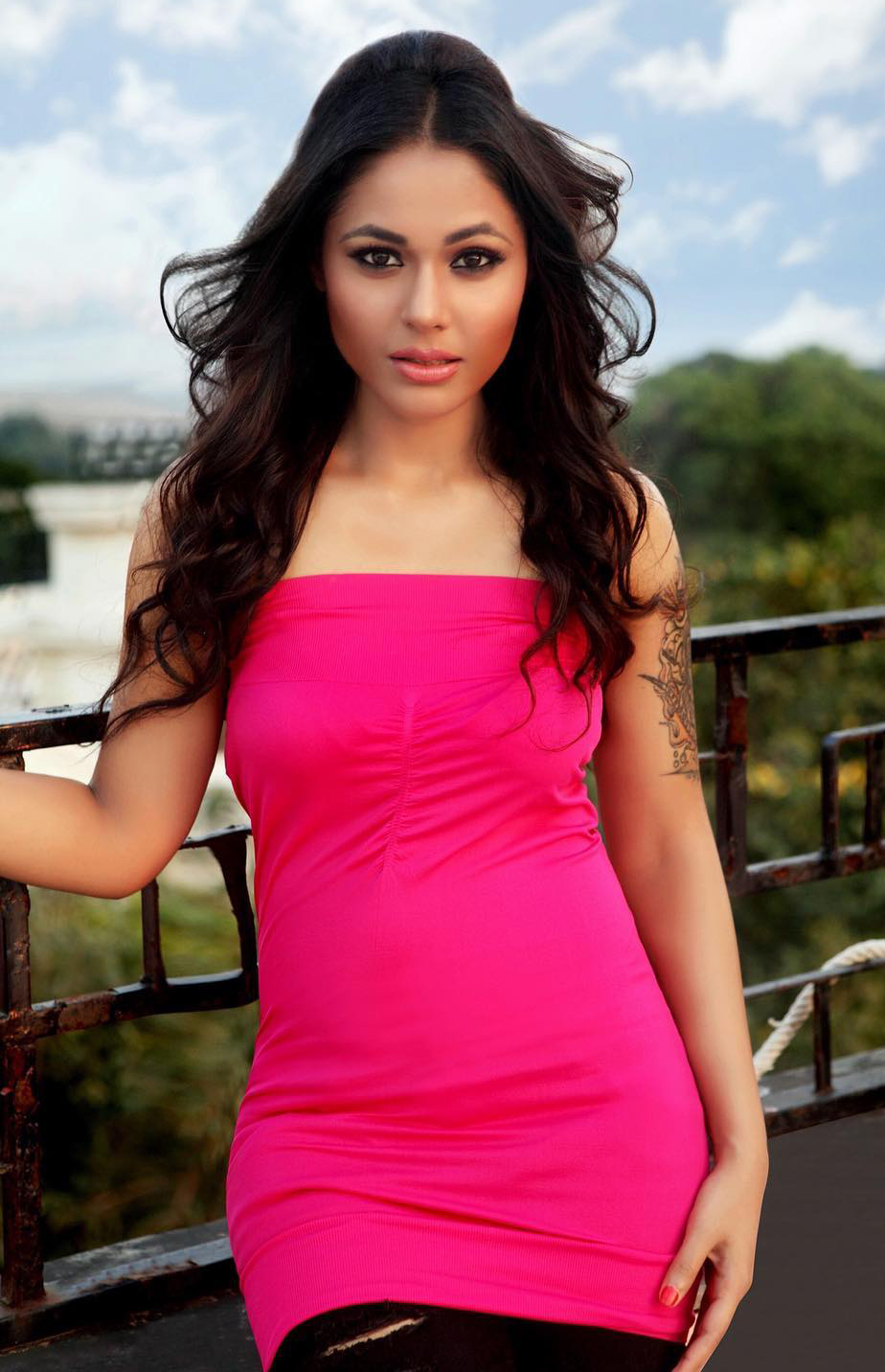
- Born: Neekita Nigam; 21 December 1991 (age 34); Bombay, Maharashtra, India
- Occupation: Playback singer
- Years active: 2007–present
- Relatives: Sonu Nigam (brother)
- Musical career
- Genres: Filmi; Pop
- Instrument: Vocals

Teesha Nigam (born 21 December 1991) is an Indian playback singer and the sister of singer Sonu Nigam.

Teesha's Telugu song 'Dheera Dheera' from Magadheera became a hit and she won the Best Debutant Female Singer at Mirchi Awards and the Best Female Playback Singer Awards at the CineMaa Awards. She has sung in numerous Telugu movies including Super, Bujjigadu, Saleem, Sree, Political Rowdy, Gunde Jhallumandi, and Shirdi Sai.She has also sung for multiple Bollywood Films such as Singh Saab The Great, ShortKut and Wanted.

== Early life ==
She was born on 21 December in Bombay (now Mumbai) to singers Agam Kumar Nigam and Shobha Nigam. Her original name was Neekita Nigam. She is the younger sister of Sonu Nigam.

== Discography ==
Telugu Discography
Year	Movie	Song	Composer(s)
2008	Gunde Jhallumandi	"I Have A Boy Friend"	M. M. Keeravani
2009	Magadheera	"Dheera Dheera"	M. M. Keeravani
2012	Shirdi Sai	"Dhatthatreyuni"	M. M. Keeravani

Singles
Song	Year	Details
Katna Nai	2016	Remake of 2008 Katna Nai by Sajjad Ali
Meri Dua Hai	2017	Collaboration With Talat Aziz

== Awards ==
Awards And Honors
Award	Song	Competition	Year	Result
Best Debutant Female Singer	Dheera Dheera	Mirchi Awards	2010	Winner
Best Female Playback Singer	Dheera Dheera	CineMAA Awards	2010	Winner
Best Female Playback Singer	Dheera Dheera	Filmfare Awards	2010	Nominated
