= Oru Kaidhiyin Diary =

1985 film by Bharathiraja

- Theatrical release poster
- Directed by: Bharathiraja
- Screenplay by: Bharathiraja
- Story by: K. Bhagyaraj
- Produced by: Chandraleela Bharathiraja
- Starring: Kamal Haasan; Radha; Revathi
- Cinematography: B. Kannan
- Edited by: V. Rajagopal
- Music by: Ilaiyaraaja
- Production company: Janani Art Creations
- Release date: 14 January 1985
- Running time: 152 minutes
- Country: India
- Language: Tamil

Oru Kaidhiyin Diary (transl. A Prisoner's Diary) is a 1985 Indian Tamil-language action thriller film directed by Bharathiraja and co-written by K. Bhagyaraj. The film stars Kamal Haasan, Radha and Revathi. It was released on 14 January 1985, and completed a 175 day run in theatres, becoming a silver jubilee film. The film was remade in Hindi by Bhagyaraj as Aakhree Raasta (1986) and in Telugu as Marana Homam (1987).

== Plot ==
David, a prisoner, tries to escape from prison but is caught and has his sentence increased manifold as a result. He gets released from prison after 22 long years and visits his dear friend Velapan. A flashback shows that David was happily married to Rosy.

David is politically active in the grassroots movement and idolises powerful politician Suryaprakasam. He introduces Rosy, and his newborn son is named James with Suryaprakasam's blessing. Unknown to David, Suryaprakasam is an evil man who, smitten by Rosy, concocts a dastardly plan for David to lead a political protest while obstructing oncoming rail traffic, knowing he will then be arrested and detained by the police. As expected, when Rosy comes to Suryaprakasam for help to release David, he rapes her, threatening to harm James if she does not submit. Violated and unable to bear the shame, Rosy then commits suicide by hanging herself and leaves her husband a handwritten note with the details. David confronts Suryaprakasam at his birthday function and demands his arrest. But Suryaprasakam escapes with help from police Inspector Viswanathan and Dr. Unnikrishnan, who manipulate Rosy's note from David and destroy it, thereby erasing all evidence of the crime. The trio then frames David for murdering Rosy.

Upon release from prison, David sees that Velapan is a wealthy man, educated David's son, and righteously raised him. David's son James is now called "Shankar" and is a well-respected and courageous police inspector. David is upset at this news, knows he cannot count on Velapan and his own son, and vows his revenge against the trio who framed him by himself, without anyone's help.

Before embarking on his mission to avenge the trio, David goes to his church and preemptively confesses to the priest that he would kill 3 people who inform the police. David tricks his way into police headquarters by posing as a priest who knows about the would-be killer and victims, and insists that he will only discuss matters with the now Superintendent of police (India) Viswanathan. Although Shankar is suspicious and assigns a policeman to watch David while verifying his identity, David successfully manipulates Sharadha, the love of Shankar and the daughter of RajaManickam, the Deputy Inspector General of Police (DIG), to distract the policeman and succeeds in entering SP Viswanathan's office. He identifies himself and reminds the SP of his horrific betrayal and, at gunpoint, makes him call his friend, Dr Unnikrishnan. He then sets up a Rube Goldbergian contraption—a hanging trap, tied to the office door. Dr Unnikrishnan comes to the SP's office as planned, and when he opens the door, SP Viswanathan is hanged and kicked out in the throes of death, watched by the aghast Dr Unnikrishnan.

Shankar investigates the clues David left in a tape-recorded conversation at SP Viswanathan's office and identifies the other two victims as Dr Unnikrishnan and Suryaprakasam. Undaunted, David then takes Sharadha hostage against his safety and kills Dr Unnikrishnan with a telescopic rifle, despite strong police protection—and escapes again. David is supported by Sharadha, who learns about and sympathises with his revenge and his wife's rape. Sharadha hides David in her house basement, which is free from police suspicion, being the DIG's house.

During the investigation, Shankar finds out David and his dad Velapan are longtime friends and confronts him. Velappan gives Shankar David's diary, which outlines all events in David's life until he went to jail. Although Shankar is upset and enraged at Suryaprakasam, he is persuaded by DIG Rajamanickam to do his duty as a policeman and not give in to sentiments. Suryaprakasam returns from this foreign trip and organises a rally. Police unwittingly lay out their plans to protect Suryaprakasam at the DIG's house, with David listening from the basement. He then disguises himself as the statue that Suryaprakasam is planning to unveil and kills him during the rally. Shankar shoots David, who dies happily that his mission is accomplished.

== Cast ==
- Kamal Haasan in a dual role as
  - David
  - James/ Shankar
- Revathi as Sharadha
- Radha as Rosy
- Janagaraj as Velappan
- Malaysia Vasudevan as Suryaprakasam the Politician
- Vijayan as Dr. Unnikrishnan
- Vinu Chakravarthy as S. P. Viswanathan
- S. R. Veeraraghavan as DIG Raja Manikkam
- Ilavarasu (uncredited)

== Production ==
Kamal Haasan and Bharathiraja initially began production on a film titled Top Takkar. After 5,000 feet (1,500 m) was canned, the film was shelved as Bharathiraja felt it was becoming too similar to his and Haasan's earlier film Sigappu Rojakkal (1978), and decided to collaborate with Haasan on a different film, which eventually became Oru Kaidhiyin Diary; K. Bhagyaraj developed the story, which Bharathiraja expanded into a screenplay. The makeup for Haasan was provided by Michael Westmore. The climax filmed by Bharathiraja differed from what Bhagyaraj wrote; the original climax was then used by Bhagyaraj for the Hindi remake.

== Soundtrack ==
The music was composed by Ilaiyaraaja with lyrics by Vairamuthu. The song "ABC Nee Vasi" is based on "L'Arlesienne" by Georges Bizet, and is set to the Carnatic raga known as Mohanam. The song "Ponmaane" is set to Shivaranjani raga. It also marked the debut of the Malayalam playback singer Unni Menon in Tamil cinema. For the Telugu-dubbed version Khaidi Veta, all lyrics were written by Rajasri.

Tamil
No.	Title	Singer(s)	Length
1.	"ABC Nee Vasi"	K. J. Yesudas, Vani Jairam	4:01
2.	"Ithu Rosa Poovu"	Vani Jairam, Gangai Amaran & Chorus	4:30
3.	"Naan Thaan Sooran"	S. P. Balasubrahmanyam, S. P. Sailaja & Chorus	4:31
4.	"Ponmane Kovam Yeno"	Unni Menon, Uma Ramanan	4:34
Total length:			17:36

Telugu
No.	Title	Singer(s)	Length
1.	"ABC Chadavali"	S. P. Balasubrahmanyam, S. P. Sailaja	4:00
2.	"O Myna"	S. P. Balasubrahmanyam, S. P. Sailaja	4:38
3.	"Oka Roja Puvvu"	S. P. Balasubrahmanyam, S. P. Sailaja	4:53
Total length:			13:32

== Reception ==
Jayamanmadhan of Kalki praised the performances of cast and crew and the film can be enjoyed for the hard work.

== Remakes ==
Oru Kaidhiyin Diary was remade in Hindi as Aakhree Raasta (1986), directed by Bhagyaraj. Despite having a dubbed version in Telugu, Oru Kaidhiyin Diary was remade in the same language as Marana Homam (1987). In 2020, despite having a Hindi remake, the film was dubbed into the same language as Main Hoon Hindustani.

== Bibliography ==
- Sundararaman (2007) [2005]. Raga Chintamani: A Guide to Carnatic Ragas Through Tamil Film Music (2nd ed.). Pichhamal Chintamani. OCLC 295034757.
