= Mysterious Girl (film) =

- Telugu DVD cover
- Starring: Uday Kiran; Venya
- Cinematography: C. Ramprasad
- Release dates: 7 March 2003 (Telugu); 2012 (Hindi)
- Country: India
- Languages: English; Hindi

Mysterious Girl is a 2003 Hinglish language romantic drama film starring debutante Uday Kiran and Venya. This film was reused in the 2003 Telugu film Jodi No.1. The film was the first film Uday Kiran had shot for and was delayed for a period of four years.

The Hindi version had a delayed release almost ten years later.

== Synopsis ==
Gautam, a shy man, is in love with Anju, a misandrist. He asks Preethi, their common friend, on how he should express his feelings. Preethi lives in her uncle's house and receives a letter written by Pinky, Anju's pen pal. Preethi's uncle advises Gautam to disguise himself as Pinky and stay with Anju. Preethi and her aunt help Gautam transform himself into a woman. The real Pinky later arrives. The rest of the story is how Gautam reveals to Anju his true identity and his love.

== Cast ==
- Uday Kiran as Gautam
- Venya as Anjali (Anju)
- Srija as Preethi
- Babloo as Babloo
- Sumeet as Shiva

Telugu version

- Kaushal Manda as Ravi
- Gautham Raju as Police inspector
- Rajitha as Wife
- Pratani Ramakrishna Goud as Husband
- Siva Reddy as Police officer
- Gundu Hanumantha Rao as Police constable

== Production ==
Uday Kiran debuted with the Hinglish film Mysterious Girl, which was produced on a low budget. The film remained unreleased since it had trouble finding buyers. The film began production after the successful film Hyderabad Blues and the entire cast was from Hyderabad. Mysterious Girl was shot in an episodic format. In 2002, the producers of the film wanted to release the film after Uday Kiran became famous, but Uday Kiran prevented the film from being released by intervening with the Indian Producers Council. Kiran was not paid for acting in the film.

== Soundtrack ==
The Telugu version featured music by Vandemataram Srinivas. All of the lyrics are written by Chandrabose, except where noted. One song "Pillo Pillo" was inspired by "Aata Kaavala" from Annayya (2000).

- "Nuvvu Naaku Telusu" - S. P. Charan, Sunitha
- "Iddaru Kalisi" - Devi Sri Prasad
- "Pillo Pillo" - Vandemataram Srinivas, Usha (lyrics by Daddy Srinivas)
- "Naa Sahara Darullo" - Sri Ram Prabhu, Usha
- "Bugaloni Sotta" - Vandemataram Srinivas

== Reception ==
Regarding the delayed Hindi version, Christopher Domingo of Full Hyderabad wrote, "The movie crawls at a snail's pace towards oblivion. Stone-faced expressions and poor dialogue delivery are just a couple of the faults in this excuse of a film. Absolutely nothing can be said about the direction, as there is none".

== Telugu version ==
The film was dubbed in Telugu as Jodi No. 1 in 2003 with Pratani Ramakrishna Goud as the director. The film featured additional scenes with Venya, Goud, and other actors and music featuring close-up shots from Holi (2002). Jeevi of Idlebrain.com rated the film 1 out of 5 stars. Gudipoodi Srihari of The Hindu wrote that "Thematically and technically too, it is a disappointing film". Manju Latha Kalanidhi of Full Hyderabad opined that "Jodi No. 1 is the kind of movie that is bad at its best and disastrous at its worst".

The film was a box office failure.
