= Ekaloveyudu =

2008 Indian film

- Poster
- Directed by: Kalidindi Ram
- Produced by: Medikonda Amarchand
- Starring: Uday Kiran; Krithi Ahuja
- Music by: Anil Krishna
- Production company: Sri Venkataramana Films
- Release date: 7 November 2008
- Running time: 153 minutes
- Country: India
- Language: Telugu

Ekaloveyudu (transl. Ekalavya's love) is a 2008 Indian Telugu-language romantic film directed by debutant KRK. The film stars Uday Kiran, Krithi Ahuja, and Babu Antony in the lead roles.

== Plot ==
Karthik is saved by a train by Bhakta, a don, who gives Kathik an enormous amount of money. Karthik goes to Ooty and meets Indu. After Indu leaves Ooty and Karthik goes searching for her, Bhakta goes hunting for both of them.

== Cast ==
- Uday Kiran as Karthik
- Krithi Ahuja as Indu
- Bob Antony as Bhakta
- Abhishek
- Chitram Srinu as Karthik's friend
- Vijay Sai as Karthik's friend
- Vinayakan as Bhakta's brother
- Chalapathi Rao as Karthik's father
- Dharmavarapu Subrahmanyam
- Ahuti Prasad
- M. Balayya
- Sudha as Karthik's mother
- Master Bharath
- Ramaraju
- Narsing Yadav as Bhakta's henchman
- Madhumani

== Production ==
The film's title was announced as Ekaloveyudu and was to be directed by a debutant. The title was created by writer Sai. Regarding the title, one of the producers, Amarchand Medikonda, state that "There is a sentiment behind the title of the film. Our blockbusters Suryudu and Narasimha Naidu ended with the same last two letters. In an interview with Idlebrain, Uday Kiran justified the title by stating that, "In Mahabharath, the character of Ekalavya is known for his devotion towards his guru. He kept his word for the guru. He cut his thumb and presented it as dhanam [a donation]. Here, the hero too holds his promise". The film was shot in 75 days.

== Soundtrack ==
The soundtrack was composed by Anil Krishna. The audio was launched on 21 September with KS Rama Rao, B. Gopal, Sekhar Suri, Ravi Raja Pinisetty, C. Kalyan, Devi Vara Prasad, and Medikonda Murali Krishna attending the event.

- "Emundi" - Tippu
- "Happyga Unta" - Chinmayi
- "Komma Kommaku" - K. S. Chitra
- "Nene Nuvvani" - Tippu
- "Pellante Noorella" - Ranjith
- "Sayyo Sayyo" - Shankar Mahadevan

== Release ==
The film was scheduled to release in the second half of April.
