= Chakravyuham: The Trap =

2023 Indian Telugu language film

- Directed by: Chetkuri Madhusudhan
- Written by: Chetkuri Madhusudhan
- Produced by: Chetkuri Savithri
- Starring: Ajay; Gnaneswari Kandregula; Vivek Trivedi; Urvashi pardeshi; Pragya Nayan
- Cinematography: G V Ajay kumar
- Edited by: Jesvin Prabu
- Music by: Bharath Manchiraju
- Distributed by: Mythri Movie Distributors LLP
- Release date: 2 June 2023
- Running time: 111.24 Minutes
- Country: India
- Budget: 2 Cr
- Box office: 2.5 Cr

Chakravyuham-The Trap is a 2023 Indian Telugu language crime thriller film written and directed by Chetkuri Madhusudhan and produced by Chetkuri Savithri co produced by Chetkuri Venkatesh and Chetkuri Anusha under the banner of Sahasra Creations. The film starring Ajay and Gnaneswari Kandregula in the lead roles. The film was released on 2 June 2023. It was also released on Amazon Prime Video on 5 July 2023.

== Plot ==
Rich businessman Sanjay returns home one night to find that his wife, Siri, has been murdered and that cash and jewelry have been stolen from the house. Police inspector Satya is assigned to investigate the case. Initially, Satya suspects Sanjay's housekeeper, Lakshimi, believing that she and her husband, Ramu, murdered Siri while robbing the house.

Satya places Sanjay under surveillance while he temporarily stays at Sharath's house, as the police have sealed his own residence during the investigation. When questioned, Sharath denies having an affair with Siri and insists that he regarded her as his own sister.

While being transported to the police station, Sanjay insists that he has been framed and refuses to admit any involvement. When the police show him the murder weapon, he claims that he possesses evidence proving his innocence. He subsequently escapes from the police vehicle.

During the interrogation, Sanjay presents the evidence stored on his phone. Secret CCTV footage from his office shows Malik stealing the paper cutter that Sanjay regularly used, proving that Malik planted the murder weapon to frame him. The phone also provides access to cloud-stored CCTV footage showing Shilpa and Malik murdering Sharath. Faced with the evidence, Shilpa and Malik confess:

Three months later, Sanjay receives the life insurance payouts for both Siri and Sharath. It is then revealed that he was the true mastermind behind the entire conspiracy despite never directly participating in the murders. He had married Siri for her ancestral property, but after she decided to donate it to charity, he became determined to get rid of her so that he can have the property. Upon realizing that Shilpa had fallen in love with him, Sanjay deliberately encouraged her feelings by pretending that he reciprocated them but was trapped in an unhappy marriage, manipulating her into planning Siri's murder.

Shortly afterward, Sanjay is assassinated by a hired killer. The killer is revealed to have been employed by Satya, who, lacking sufficient evidence to prosecute Sanjay, chooses to exact justice outside the law.

== Cast ==
- Ajay as CI Satyanarayana
- Gnaneswari Kandregula as SI Durga Nayak
- Vivek Trivedi as Sanjay Rao
- Urvashi Pardeshi as Siri
- Pragya Nayan as Shilpa
- Kireeti Damaraju as Hacker
- Subhalekha Sudhakar as Siri's Grandfather (Jagannatha Rao)
- Rajeev Kanakala as Sridhar
- Srikanth Iyengar as Srinivas
- Shailaja Priya as Shakunthala Devi
- Raj Tirandasu as Ravi
- Ravi as Constable Ramaswamy
- Sudesh Sathri as Sarath
- Rishi as Mallik
- Divya Dicholkar as Maid Durga

== Reception ==
The film received a mixed critical response. ABP Desam gave the film 2.5 stars out of five.

== Home media ==
The movie was released on Amazon Prime Video on 5 July 2023.
