= Saarai Veerraju =

Saarai Veerraju / Vettattam
- Directed by: D. S. Kannan
- Produced by: P. R. K. Rao
- Starring: Ajay; Remya Nambeesan; Madhulika
- Cinematography: D. B. Vishwa
- Music by: Sri Sai
- Release date: 4 December 2009
- Country: India
- Language: Telugu

Saarai Veeraju is a 2009 Indian Telugu-language drama film written and directed by D. S. Kannan, an erstwhile assistant to S. S. Rajamouli and Krishna Vamsi. The film, produced by P. R. K. Rao under the banner of Visalakshi Creations, stars Ajay (in his lead debut), Remya Nambeesan, and newcomer Madhulika. The music was composed by Sri Sai with cinematography by D. B. Vishwa. The film released on 4 December 2009. It was dubbed in Tamil as Vettattam.

== Plot ==
Veerraju is saving money to go to Dubai. He almost loses his life trying to save a girl, thereby making new enemies. On the way to Dubai, he is attracted to Preeti (Madhulika), an air hostes,s and falls for her. Veerraju's mission in Dubai is to kill a big shot named Vishnu, and before he kills hi,m he asks him if he remembers Narsipatnam and Dhanalaxmi (Remya Nambeeshan).

The backstory tells what happened in Narsipatnam and who Dhanalaxmi is. After the present, the story tells what Veerraju will do when he needs to kill the other goons relating to the Narsipatnam incident.

== Cast ==
- Ajay as Saarai Veerraju
- Remya Nabeeshan as Dhanalaxmi
- Madhulika as Preethi
- Mumaith Khan as a guest dancer for a song
- Ramya Nadalla
- Jogi
- Baby Ani
- Dhanraj Koranani
- Shalee
- Vinay
- Giri
- Giridhar
- Ajay Ghosh
- Ramakrishna
- Rajesh
- Vishvendhar
- Sivannarayana Naripeddi
- Kishore Das
- Sathanna
- Anji
- P. V. Narasimha Rao
- Rajkumar
- Brahma Reddy
- Santhosh Yadav

== Production ==
The inspiration for the film's story came from the book Aru Saro Kathalu by Raavi Sastry.

== Soundtrack ==
Telugu (original) tracklist
No.	Title	Singer(s)	Length
1.	"Inthe Neninthe"	Vijay Tejeshwar
2.	"Suridila"	Karthik
3.	"Veechey Gali"	Shweta Mohan
4.	"Kommapaina Kokilamma"	S. P. Balasubrahmanyam
5.	"Allarantha Allukundi"	Shweta
6.	"Needho Nadho"	Karthik, Shweta Mohan
7.	"Eppasara"	Ranjith
8.	"Theme (Rudhram Bhajai)"	Bhavan, Senthil, Vijay Tejeshwar
9.	"Atreyapuram"	Ranina Reddy
10.	"Grahanam Edo"	V. V. Prasanna
