= Master Bharath =

Indian actor

- Born: Bharath Kumar; 9 April 1996 (age 30); Chennai, Tamil Nadu, India
- Occupation: Actor
- Years active: 2002–present
- Awards: 2008 Government of Tamil Nadu; 2008 Nandi Award; 2010 Nandi Award

Bharath Kumar (born 9 April 1996), professionally known as Master Bharath, is an Indian actor who works prominently in Telugu films apart from a few Tamil films and television serials.

== Career ==
Bharath debuted in the Telugu television industry at the age of three for the ETV serial Matru Devata. He debuted in the Tamil film industry with the film Naina in 2002. and his performance in Panchathanthiram later that year brought him attention. The Telugu dub of the latter film gained Kumar the attention of director Srinu Vaitla, whom he collaborated in all of his forthcoming films including Venky and Ready, which earned Kumar a Nandi award for best child actor.

He received a Government of Tamil Nadu Award for Best Child Artiste for the television serial My Dear Bootham. Kumar received a second Nandi Award for Best Child Actor in 2010.

In 2019, Kumar co-starred in the film ABCD: American Born Confused Desi with Allu Sirish. As an adult actor, he did not find success and several films that he acted in failed commercially.

== Personal life ==
Despite being a Tamilian, his fluency in Telugu (his mother hailed from the Tamil Nadu-Andhra Pradesh border) made him popular in Telugu. In 2020, he revealed that a gym accident caused him to be blind in his right eye. In 2025, his mother passed away which further affected his film career.

== Filmography ==
List of film performances
Year	Title	Role	Language	Ref.
2002	Naina	Young Pasupathy	Tamil	
2002	Panchathanthiram	Appukuttan Ayyappan Nair	Tamil	credited as Master Bharathkumar
2003	Indru Mudhal	Geetha's childhood rival	Tamil	
2004	Anandamanandamaye	Pattabhi	Telugu	
2004	Venky	Train passenger	Telugu	
2004	Gudumba Shankar		Telugu	
2005	Manasu Maata Vinadhu	Bunty	Telugu	
2006	Saravana	Deepak	Tamil	
2006	Happy	Bunny's neighbor	Telugu	
2006	Pokiri	Sruthi's brother	Telugu	
2006	Andala Ramudu		Telugu	
2006	Tata Birla Madhyalo Laila	Seetayya	Telugu	
2007	Pokkiri	Pappu	Tamil	
2007	Viyabari	Rowdy Rangan's son	Tamil	
2007	Dhee	Mani Ratnam	Telugu	
2007	Dubai Seenu	Seenu's nephew	Telugu	
2008	Madurai Ponnu Chennai Paiyan	Nandhu	Tamil	
2008	Kantri	Rambo	Telugu	
2008	Ready	Junior Chitti Naidu "Puli"	Telugu	
2008	Siddu from Sikakulam		Telugu	
2008	Chintakayala Ravi	Bharath	Telugu	
2008	Rainbow	Pandu	Telugu	
2008	Dongala Bandi		Telugu	
2008	Ekaloveyudu		Telugu	
2008	Silambattam		Tamil	
2008	King	Master	Telugu	
2009	Malli Malli		Telugu	
2009	Aa Okkadu		Telugu	
2009	Adugu		Telugu	
2009	Oy!	Maruthi	Telugu	
2009	Ninnu Kalisaka	Joo Joo	Telugu	
2009	Bumper Offer		Telugu	
2009	Saleem	Laddu	Telugu	
2010	Namo Venkatesa	Puppy	Telugu	
2010	Bindaas		Telugu	
2010	Maa Annayya Bangaram	Mahesh	Telugu	
2010	Puli	Newspaper boy	Telugu	
2010	Uthamaputhiran	Chinna Moorthy Gounder	Tamil	
2010	Ragada	Narayana	Telugu	
2011	Siruthai	Wedding guest	Tamil	
2011	Mr. Perfect	Priya's brother	Telugu	
2011	Veera	Aiki's brother	Telugu	
2011	Badrinath		Telugu	
2011	Dookudu	Muddu Krishna	Telugu	
2011	Veedu Theda	Abbayi Raju	Telugu	
2012	Nippu	Kaasi's son	Telugu	
2012	Ramadandu		Telugu	
2012	Naa Ishtam	Dora Babu	Telugu	
2012	Mirattal	James Cameron	Tamil	
2012	Denikaina Ready	Raghulingam Sastry	Telugu	
2012	Sarocharu	Vasudha's brother	Telugu	
2012	Yamudiki Mogudu	Yamaganda	Telugu	
2013	Vennela 1½	Bharath	Telugu	
2013	Masala	Suri's friend	Telugu	
2013	Baadshah		Telugu	
2013	Oruvar Meethu Iruvar Sainthu	Ganeshan's friend	Tamil	
2013	Doosukeltha	Ranganna	Telugu	
2014	Autonagar Surya	Bharath	Telugu	
2014	Alludu Seenu		Telugu	
2014	Jaihind 2	Student	Tamil	
2014	Jaihind 2	Student	Telugu	
2014	Abhimanyu	Student	Kannada	
2015	Size Zero	Yahoo	Telugu	
2015	Inji Iduppazhagi	Yahoo	Tamil	
2016	Eedu Gold Ehe	Gopal	Telugu	
2017	Mister	Bukkarayalu	Telugu	
2018	Achari America Yatra	Train passenger	Telugu	
2019	ABCD – American Born Confused Desi	Bala Shanmugam "Bhasha"	Telugu	
2019	Iddari Lokam Okate	Mahi's friend	Telugu	
2021	FCUK: Father Chitti Umaa Kaarthik	Ph.D. (Pathuri Hanumantha Das)	Telugu	
2024	Viswam	Raju	Telugu	

=== Television ===
List of television performances
Year	Title	Role	Language	Channel	Ref.
	Matru Devata		ETV	Telugu	
2004–2007	My Dear Bootham	Balu	Sun TV	Tamil	
2004–2007	Raja Rajeshwari		Sun TV	Tamil	

== Awards and nominations ==
List of awards
Year	Award	Category	Work	Result	Ref.
2008	Government of Tamil Nadu	Best Child Artiste	My Dear Bootham	Won	
2008	Nandi Awards	Best Child Actor	Ready	Won	
2010	Nandi Awards	Best Child Actor	Bindaas	Won	
2012	South Indian International Movie Awards	Best Comedian (Telugu)	Denikaina Ready	Nominated	
