= Chitram Srinu =

Indian actor

- Occupation: Actor
- Years active: 2000-present

Chitram Srinu is an Indian actor who primarily appears in Telugu films. Srinu made his debut through the film Chitram. He has acted in over 260 films. He turned hero for the unreleased films Viswadhabhi Rama and Mayasabha.

== Career ==
Originally from Khammam, he is known for his roles in Chitram (2000), Anandam (2001), Venky (2004), Bommarillu (2006), Dubai Seenu (2006), Mantra (2007) and 100% Love (2011).

== Filmography ==
Year	Title	Role	Note
2000	Chitram	Ramana's friend	
2001	Anandam	Chandu	
2002	Aadi		
2002	Nuvvu Leka Nenu Lenu	Guava seller	
2002	Hai		
2002	Neetho	Madhav's friend	
2002	Sontham	Shesham's friend	
2002	Okato Number Kurraadu		
2002	Yuva Rathna		
2002	Nee Thodu Kavali		
2002	Nee Sneham	Madhav's friend	
2003	Ammayilu Abbayilu	Bulli	
2003	Uthsaham		
2003	Sambhu		
2003	Vishnu		
2003	Taarak		
2004	Malliswari	Peon Seenu	
2004	Venky	Ramana	
2004	Ammayi Bagundi		
2004	Gowri		
2004	Sakhiya		
2005	Orey Pandu		
2005	Prayatnam		
2005	Bunny	Bunny's friend	
2005	Narasimhudu		
2005	Guru		
2005	Modati Cinema		
2006	Premante Inthe		
2006	Bommarillu	Kedimangina Sreenu	
2006	Tata Birla Madhyalo Laila		
2006	Seetharamudu		
2006	Nee Navve Chalu		
2006	Nuvve		
2007	Jagadam	Vaali	
2007	Dhee		
2007	Dubai Seenu	Ramana	
2007	Satyabhama		
2007	Mantra		
2007	Bangaru Konda		
2007	Godava		
2008	Krishna	Krishna's friend	
2008	Pelli Kani Prasad		
2008	Bhale Dongalu	Bouquet seller	
2008	Gita		
2008	Naa Manasukemaindi		
2008	Parugu	Shrinu	
2008	Maa Ayana Chanti Pilladu		
2008	Ekaloveyudu		
2008	Dongala Bandi		
2009	Pistha		
2009	Vaade Kavali		
2010	Taj Mahal		
2010	Thakita Thakita		
2010	Komaram Puli	Constable	
2011	100% Love		
2011	Mayagadu		
2012	Nuvvekkadunte Nenakkadunta		
2012	Mythri		
2012	Sarocharu		
2012	Em Babu Laddu Kavala		
2013	Chukkalanti Ammayi Chakkanaina Abbayi		
2013	Sukumarudu		
2014	Manam	Constable Sreenu	
2014	Drushyam	Bus Owner Murali	
2014	Power		
2014	Aagadu		
2017	Raja the Great	Lucky's Uncle	
2017	Nene Raju Nene Mantri	Constable D. Sahu	
2018	Nela Ticket		
2018	Jamba Lakidi Pamba		
2018	Geetha Govindam	Taxi driver	
2018	Taxiwaala		
2019	Bhagyanagara Veedullo Gamattu		
2021	Maa Oori Polimera	Ramesh	
2022	10th Class Diaries		
2022	Raajahyogam	Radha’s assistant	
2023	Maa Oori Polimera 2	Ramesh	
2023	Breakout	Raju	
2024	Bahirbhoomi	Nagendra	
2024	Dhoom Dhaam	Warangal Satthi’s assistant	
2024	C202		
2024	Laggam	Prakash’s assistant	
2025	Shanmukha		
2025	Premalo Rendosaari		
2025	Trimukha	Khaidi - 320	
2026	Sampradayini Suppini Suddapoosani	Driving School Instructor	
2026	Son Of	Venkatrao’s friend	
2026	Peddi	Ranga	

=== Television ===
- 9 Hours (2022; Disney+ Hotstar)
