= Poi (film) =

2006 film by K. Balachander

- DVD cover
- Directed by: K. Balachander
- Written by: K. Balachander; Thamira (dialogues)
- Produced by: Prakash Raj
- Starring: Uday Kiran; Vimala Raman
- Cinematography: Biju Viswanath
- Music by: Vidyasagar
- Production company: Duet Movies
- Release date: 22 December 2006
- Country: India
- Language: Tamil

Poi (transl. The Lie) is a 2006 Indian Tamil-language romantic drama film directed by K. Balachander in his 101st and final film as a director. Produced by Prakash Raj, the film starts Uday Kiran (in his Tamil debut) and Vimala Raman (in her acting debut), while Geetu Mohandas, Prakash Raj, Adithya Menon, and Avinash play supporting roles along with the director in a guest appearance. The music was composed by Vidyasagar with cinematography by Biju Viswanath. The film was released on 22 December 2006.

== Plot ==
Valluvanar (Avinash) is an upright political leader in Tamil Nadu who is much respected for his honesty and uprightness, and he refuses to compromise on this trait, even when his only son Kamban (Uday Kiran) finds himself in jail for no fault of his. The opposition party takes advantage of the situation and bails out Kamban, who joins the party, much to his father's embarrassment. The media laps it up, sensationalising it further. Kamban decides to leave the country until things cool down. Only his mother Vasuki (Anuradha Krishnamurthy), with whom he is close, is aware of this plan. Kamban arrives at Sri Lanka where he befriends Banerjee (Badava Gopi), a Bengali, and stays with him. One day, he finds a Tamil literary book on the beach, which he traces to Shilpa (Vimala Raman), the owner of the book. Shilpa is a college student preparing for civil services examination. The film juggles between reality and fiction, where Theepori, the fictitious father image of Kamban, advises him to fall in love. That sets in rolling the love story as Kamban persists in wooing Shilpa. She is staying with her brother's family. Shilpa is keen on realising her ambitions and feels that love and marriage often comes in the way of women's career. The rest of the story is about the emotional conflict between her career and love. After Vasuki's death, Valluvanar reaches Sri Lanka. Kamban is unaware of his mother's death. Shilpa's family meets Valluvanar. Meanwhile, Kamban goes to meet Shilpa to hand over the passport, but due to his friend's lie, he ends up thinking that Shilpa committed suicide. How the lie told to reunite the lovers gives the tragic end is the end of the story.

== Cast ==
- Uday Kiran as Kamban a.k.a. Bharati
- Vimala Raman as Shilpa
- Geetu Mohandas as Ramya
- Prakash Raj as Vidhi (Fate)
- Adithya Menon as Vishnu
- Avinash as Valluvanar
- Sridhar as Roshan
- Anuradha Krishnamurthy as Vasuki
- Renuka as Menaka
- Badava Gopi as Banerjee
- Bombay Gnanam
- K. Balachander as the man who plays dice with Fate
- Samuthirakani as Kamban's friend

== Soundtrack ==
Music was composed by Vidyasagar.

| Song | Singers | Lyrics |
|---|---|---|
| "Azhaghana Poigale" | Ranjith | Vairamuthu |
| "Enna Tholaithai" | K. S. Chithra | Kirithaya |
| "Hitler Penne" | Tippu, Sujatha | Pa. Vijay |
| "Inge Inge Oru Paatu" | Shankar Mahadevan | Pa. Vijay |
| "Iyakkunare" | Harini, Sriram Parthasarathy | Kabilan |
| "Kandu Pidithen" | K. Narayan | Kirithaya |
| "Kannamoochi" | S. P. Balasubrahmanyam | Kirithaya |
| "Kutti Kutti Kavithai" | Pop Shalini | Pa. Vijay |
| "La La La" | S. P. Balasubrahmanyam | Pa. Vijay |

== Critical reception ==
Saraswathy Srinivas of Rediff.com wrote "you expect so much from Balachander, a genuine icon of Tamil filmdom; if you leave adulation aside, though, you have to say that his latest film disappoints". Nowrunning wrote "Poi lacks the marks of KB's earlier films". Malini Mannath of Chennai Online wrote "Poi seems more of a self-indulgent trip for the director, crafted without any thought of audience sensibilities." Lajjavathi of Kalki praised the performances of star cast, music and cinematography and noted though despite some of the scenes feeling dated, she called the film as emotional struggle with true lovers. Reviewing the Telugu-dubbed version Abaddam, Idlebrain wrote that Balachander "is still capable of narrating a sensitive story very sensibly, but his commercial sense is completely out-dated".
