= Aakhree Raasta =

1986 film by K. Bhagyaraj

- Promotional Poster
- Directed by: K. Bhagyaraj
- Written by: Rahi Masoom Reza (Dialogue)
- Screenplay by: K. Bhagyaraj
- Story by: K. Bhagyaraj
- Based on: Oru Kaidhiyin Diary; By K. Bhagyaraj
- Produced by: A. Purnachandra Rao
- Starring: Amitabh Bachchan; Jaya Prada; Sridevi; Anupam Kher
- Cinematography: S. Gopal Reddy
- Edited by: A. Selvanathan; A. P. Manivannan
- Music by: Laxmikant–Pyarelal
- Production company: Lakshmi Productions(Madras)(P).LTD
- Distributed by: Lakshmi Productions(Madras)(P).LTD
- Release date: 1986
- Running time: 165 minutes
- Language: Hindi

Aakhree Raasta (transl. Last option) is a 1986 Indian Hindi-language vigilante action film written and directed by K. Bhagyaraj, presented by T. Rama Rao and produced by A. Purnachandra Rao both under banner Lakshmi Productions (Madras) (P).LTD. The film stars Amitabh Bachchan (in a dual role), Jaya Prada, Sridevi and Anupam Kher. It was directed by the Tamil actor and director K. Bhagyaraj. Rekha dubbed Sridevi's voice for her in this movie.

The film was a remake of the Tamil film Oru Kaidhiyin Diary which was also scripted by Bhagyaraj, but directed by Bharathiraja.

== Plot ==
In 1962, David D'Costa lives a relatively poor life in Madras (now Chennai) with his wife Mary D'Costa who is pregnant. He worships the Member of Parliament Chaturvedi, and is even willing to die for him. He introduces Mary to Chaturvedi, and with his blessings they name the new-born son James. One day while he is busy obstructing rail traffic, he gets arrested and is bailed out by his best friend Mahesh Shandilya. When he returns home, he finds that Mary has committed suicide. She left a handwritten note saying that Chaturvedi raped her. An upset David goes to confront Chaturvedi, but is intercepted by Police Inspector Roop Kumar Sahay and Dr. Verma, who turn out to be Chaturvedi's allies. Inspector Sahay double crosses David and manipulates Mary's note from him. Dr Verma then subsequently burns the note, while the three of them laugh at the hapless David. The sole evidence of Chaturvedi's crime is therefore destroyed. The trio frame David as the reason for Mary's death, lie in court and succeed in their evil plan. Therefore, David was sentenced to 24 years in prison. Before being imprisoned, enraged David asked Mahesh to be James' guardian in his long absence and to raise James to be a fearsome criminal so he can avenge Mary's death.

Twenty-four years later in 1986, David is released. He goes to visit Mahesh and is shocked to find that Mahesh has changed. He is no longer a boot-legger and now lives a wealthy lifestyle. Mahesh wants David to forget the past, but David reveals that his only goal is to kill the three men who wronged him. David asks about his son James, and Mahesh reveals that he renamed the boy Vijay and raised him as his own, who does not know anything about his biological parents. Being in Mahesh's custody, Vijay grew up thinking Mahesh is his father. As a flabbergast to David who wanted his son to become a goon, Vijay grows up to become a police officer who hates criminals. David is devastated with this news, but is determined to avenge his wrongful conviction and Mary's death, so he sets about to kill his tormentors one by one.

David sees Vijay at a graveyard and recognizes him as his son, but conceals his identity from him. They engage in a heated argument and end on odd terms. Meanwhile, Vijay is in love with Vinita, who is the daughter of DIG Ranjith Bhatnagar. David disguises himself as a church priest and goes to the police station where he wishes to meet Sahay and discuss information about a criminal who wants to kill three people. Before leaving him and Sahay to talk, Vijay turns on a mic recorder so he can overhear the conversation. David pulls out Sahay's pistol, divulges his true identity, and threatens to kill Sahay. When Vijay tries to overhear the conversation, Vinita prank calls him and he loses focus. Vijay listens to the final words of the conversation and rushes to the room, where David ties up Sahay and hangs him with a pulley, which kills him when Vijay opens the door. DIG Bhatnagar admonishes Vijay for being careless and not being able to save Sahay.

Based on what he heard from the conversation, Vijay goes to the local prison and finds details about David, whom he rounds down as the killer. He also notices a facial similarity between himself and David. He relays this information to the police department, after which he is assigned to protect the other two men, Chaturvedi and Dr. Verma. Realizing Verma is the next target, they give security to him when he falls ill. When David finds out that Vinita is the DIG's daughter, he kidnaps her and blackmails Bhatnagar to hand over Verma in exchange for her. However, Bhatnagar gives more importance to his duty and refuses. David sets himself on the top of a nearby building and gives a false alarm to the security to distract them. David kills Verma by shooting him through the window of his room. Vijay chases him, but he manages to escape. When he returns, he finds out Vinita is Vijay's lover and showers her with affection and releases her, asking her not to give out any details of him or the hideout if she feels that he hasn't done anything wrong, to which she agrees. She returns to Vijay's house and elicits the truth from Mahesh, who tells her Vijay is David's son.

Vijay remembers that he looks similar to David and that David visited Mahesh once he was released from prison. Thus, he disguises himself as David using a wig and beard, and visits his own house to speak to Mahesh. Mahesh, falling for the disguise, drops the knowledge of Vijay's birth secret and that Vijay's mother was raped by the very man whom he has been protecting. Subsequently, the police barge into the house and arrest Mahesh. Vijay removes his disguise and breaks down in shock. Vijay chooses to resign as he is ashamed of protecting the very man who raped his mother and wronged his father. However, Bhatnagar stops him and encourages him to continue.

Vijay visits the cemetery where his mother's grave is located. David appears, and after they pray, Vijay tries to arrest him but David cleverly escapes. Meanwhile, Chaturvedi is preparing for a political rally, where Vijay and Bhatnagar are providing him security. David uses the manhole underneath to plant a bomb under Chaturvedi's vehicle, but his efforts are thwarted by Vijay who finds the bomb and throws it far away. Vijay and the other policemen go underground and round up David. When David tries to escape from the drain using a rope, Vijay shoots him and David collapses, leaving Vijay heartbroken. Vijay takes David out through the manhole. Chaturvedi ridicules David and commends Vijay for saving him. However, David turns out with a pistol and shoots Chaturvedi dead before he breathes his last. The film ends with Vijay proudly looking and clapping for his father.

== Cast ==
- Amitabh Bachchan as David D'Costa/ Inspector Vijay Shandilya/ James D'Costa (dual role)
- Jaya Prada as Mary D'Costa (David's wife)
- Sridevi as Vinita Bhatnagar (Vijay's girlfriend) (Voice dubbed by Rekha)
- Anupam Kher as Mahesh Shandilya
- Dalip Tahil as Inspector Roop Kumar Sahay
- Sadashiv Amrapurkar as Minister Balwant Chaturvedi
- Bharat Kapoor as Dr. Verma
- Om Shivpuri as DIG SK Bhatnagar
- Viju Khote as Amarnath, Senior Inspector

== Production ==
Rajesh Khanna opted out due to date issues.

== Soundtrack ==
Anand Bakshi wrote the lyrics.

Aakhree Raasta

Soundtrack album by Laxmikant-Pyarelal
- Genre: Film soundtrack
- Label: T-Series

#	Title	Singer(s)
1	"Dance Music"	Anuradha Paudwal
2	"Gori Ka Saajan Saajan Ki Gori"	Mohammad Aziz, S. Janaki
3	"Pehle Padhai Phir Pyar Hoga"	Mohammad Aziz, S. Janaki
4	"Tune Mera Doodh Piya Hai" (version 1)	Mohammed Aziz, S. Janaki
5	"Tune Mera Doodh Piya Hai" (version 2)	Mohammed Aziz, S. Janaki
6	"Gori Ka Saajan Saajan Ki Gori" (Instrumental)	

== Home media ==
The DVD version of the film was released by IndiaWeekly under its own label.

== In other media ==
The name of the character Aakhri Pasta from the Housefull film series is a pun on Aakhree Raasta.
