= Nuvvekkadunte Nenakkadunta =

Nuvvekkaddunte Nenakkadunta
- Poster
- Directed by: Subha Selvam
- Written by: Janardhana Maharshi
- Produced by: Eashwar Varaprasad; D. Kumar
- Starring: Uday Kiran; Shweta Prasad
- Cinematography: N. Raghav
- Edited by: Nandamuri Hari
- Music by: Pradeep Koneru
- Release date: 20 April 2012
- Country: India
- Language: Telugu

Nuvvekkadunte Nenakkadunta (translation: I will be there where you are) is a 2012 Indian Telugu-language romance film starring Uday Kiran and Shweta Prasad in the lead roles directed by Subha Selvam. The soundtrack of the film was composed by Pradeep Koneru. The film was released on 20 April 2012 to negative reviews. The film was partially reshot and released in Tamil as Oru Mutham Oru Yuddham in 2013.

== Cast ==
- Uday Kiran as Hari
- Shweta Prasad as Haritha
- Baby Annie as an orphan child
- Aarthi as Nilambari
- Ajith Kumar as Bhadra
- Nalini
- Ashish Vidyarthi
- Nizhalgal Ravi
- Brahmanandam as Saikumar, hearing impaired advocate
- Chitram Srinu as Seenu
- AVS as finance company boss
- Gundu Hanumantha Rao as priest
- Gautam Raju
- Rajyalakshmi
- Gundu Sudharshan
- Amit Tiwari
- Fish Venkat
- V. S. Raghavan as Hari's grandfather

Tamil version

- Manobala as finance company boss
- Vennira Aadai Moorthy as Leoni
- Kovai Senthil

== Soundtrack ==
Soundtrack was composed by Pradeep Koneru.

No.	Title	Singer(s)	Length
1.	"Uppenala Ningini"	Ranjith
2.	"Manasaganannadi"	Vedala Hemachandra, Geetha Madhuri
3.	"Jabili"	Karthik
4.	"Kondalo Koyilamma"	Sathish, Malavika
5.	"Suryachandrulaina"	Anuradha Sriram

== Reception ==
Times of India wrote "Director Shubha Selvam has tried hard to create suspense in the film, but his efforts only gets onto your nerves and only ends up creating more confusion". 123telugu wrote "Though having an interesting concept, director Selvam has failed miserably in executing it on the screen. None of the scenes are watchable".
