= Vambuchanda =

- DVD cover
- Directed by: Raj Kapoor
- Written by: K. Selva Bharathy
- Produced by: Venkatesh A
- Starring: Sathyaraj; Uday Kiran; Diya
- Cinematography: Suresh
- Edited by: G. B. Venkatesh
- Music by: D. Imman
- Production company: Jai Mataji Cine Combines
- Release date: 29 February 2008
- Running time: 137 minutes
- Country: India
- Language: Tamil
- Budget: ₹3 crore

Vambuchanda (transl. Provocative fight) is a 2008 Indian Tamil-language film directed by Raj Kapoor and written by K. Selva Bharathy. The film stars Sathyaraj, Uday Kiran and Diya. The music for the film was composed by D. Imman.

== Plot ==
Prabhakaran alias Prabhu is a college student who does not allow anyone to do wrong. He quite often argues with others to the point where he is repeatedly arrested. When he was younger his foster father, Nehru, a psychiatrist used to bail him out. In the meantime, Swetha, the sister of the commissioner of police Ravichandran, has been ditching her college classes, so her father has a police escort take her to school. When she tries to escape from her escort, they pursue her. They cross paths with the troublesome Prabhu, who battles them. In the ensuing fight, Prabhu says 'I love you' to Swetha and she is so impressed by his gallantry, she falls in love.

Prabhu then learns that his foster parents are taking him to meet his real father, Jeevanandham, who had been receiving treatment in a mental hospital. He tries to speak with his father, but the man is unresponsive. On the advice of Swetha's father, he takes his father to Kerala for treatment. When there, he meets a former bodyguard of Jeevanandham who tells him that not only was his father the former Election Commissioner, but that his current mental breakdown state was caused by local politician Dharmalingam. Coincidentally, Dharmalingam has been brought to that same Kerala facility by his own son, Narayanan. When Dharmalingam's son learns that his father's former enemy Jeevanandham is still alive, he attempts to kill him.

== Cast ==
- Sathyaraj as Jeevanandham
- Uday Kiran as Prabhakaran "Prabhu"
- Diya as Swetha
- Chitrabhanu
- Livingston as Nehru
- Raj Kapoor as Ravichandran
- Ramesh Khanna
- Ilavarasu
- FEFSI Vijayan as Dharmalingam
- Riyaz Khan as Narayanan
- Manobala
- Rajan P Dev as Malayali doctor
- Sukumari as Jeevanandham's mother
- Sabitha Anand as Lakshmi, Prabhakaran's mother
- Shakeela
- Singamuthu
- Nellai Siva as follower of Mahatma Gandhi
- Siva Narayana Murthy as Police Inspector
- Besant Ravi as Rowdy
- Sampath Ram
- Karthik Sabesh as Prabhu's friend

=== Telugu version ===
- Brahmanandam
- Raghu Babu
- Shankar Melkote
- Duvvasi Mohan
- Mumaith Khan as an item number in "Em Smile Raa"

== Production ==
Ankitha was initially considered to portray Lakshmi in the film.

== Themes and influences ==
Hayden Seth Kantor of Cornell University compared Uday Kiran's character, who avenges the murder of his family, to the “angry young man” characters that Amitabh Bachchan played.

== Soundtrack ==
The soundtrack was composed by D. Imman. In a pre-release event for the Telugu version titled Lakshmi Putrudu held at Ravi Narayana Reddy Kalyanamantapam (Ravi Narayana Reddy Memorial Auditorium Complex) in Hyderabad, Damodar Reddy, the Andhra Pradesh State Minister for Information Technology, officially launched the audio cassette by handing a copy to Tammareddy and with its first number dedicated to producer Ashok Kumar. Distribution rights to the audio CD for the Telugu version were purchased by Srinivas, a State Trading corporation chairman and former legislator. In an audio review, Saraswathy Srinivas rated the soundtrack two out of five stars and wrote, "It's another lacklustre fare from D Imman".

Vambuchanda

Soundtrack album by D. Imman
- Released: 2008
- Recorded: 23 August 2007
- Genre: Feature film soundtrack
- Language: Tamil

D. Imman chronology
Thavam (2007)	Vambuchanda (2008)	Durai (2008)

Tamil Soundtrack

No.	Title	Lyrics	Singer(s)	Length
1.	"Edharkkaga"	Thabu Shankar	Jassie Gift, Sayanora Philip
2.	"Jee Boom Baa"	Pa. Vijay	Naveen, Archith
3.	"Pagai Odunga"	Pa. Vijay
4.	"Thaal Thiravai"	Pa. Vijay	Naresh Iyer, Jyotsna
5.	"Tension Machaan"	Pa. Vijay	Vijay Yesudas

Telugu Soundtrack

No.	Title	Singer(s)	Length
1.	"Em Chusi Nanne Nuvvu"	Jassie Gift, Sayanora Philip	04:40
2.	"Zee Bhoom Baa"	Achyut, Naveen	03:55
3.	"Sawariya Sawariya"	Jyotsna, Naresh Iyer	04:58
4.	"Ekkadunna Tension Mama"	Ranjith	04:09
5.	"Adigadigo Toofan"	Rahul Nambiar	02:40
6.	"Em Smile Raa"	Suchitra	04:35

== Reception ==
Koodal.com said the film was too noisy but entertaining timepass. Cinesouth praised Sathyaraj's performance, the climax and screenplay of the second half but noted that "Whatever is not mentioned in the plus" was a minus.

== Other versions ==
The film was dubbed in Hindi as Mr. Badmash.
