= Pratani Ramakrishna Goud =

Telugu film producer

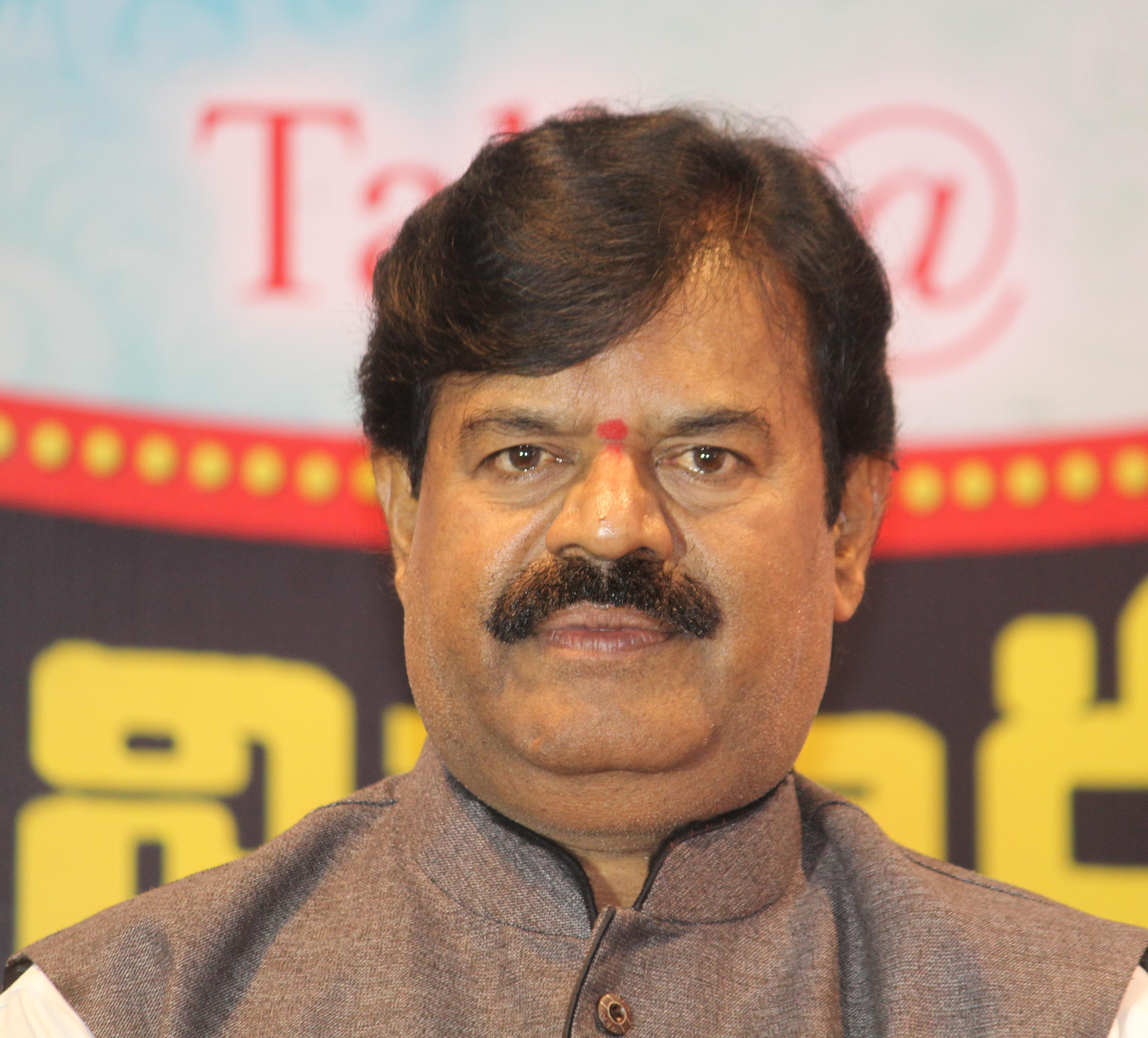
- Pratani Ramakrishna Goud in Cinivaram, Ravindra Bharathi, Hyderabad
- Other names: R. K. Goud
- Occupations: Director, producer
- Years active: 1995–present

Pratani Ramakrishna Goud, also known as R.K. Goud, is a Telugu film producer, director, screenplay writer and distributor. He is the president of the Telugu Film Chamber of Commerce.

He produced and directed a few movies under his own banner R.K. Films in addition to releasing dubbed films.

== Filmography ==
=== As director ===
Year	Title	Notes	Ref.
2005	Mogudu Pellala Dongata	Partially reshot version of Kuch To Gadbad Hai; also lyricist for the song "Sirisilla"	
2006	Sardar Papanna		

=== As producer and presenter ===
Year	Work	Credited as	Notes	Ref.
Year	Work	Producer	Notes	Ref.
1995	Yuva Raktam	Yes	Dubbed version of Rajavin Parvaiyile	
1998	Allari Pellam	Presenter		
2003	Jodi No.1	Yes	Partially reshot version of Mysterious Girl; also actor	
2006	Beats	Presenter		
2008	Miss Bharathi	Presenter		
2009	Bank	Presenter		
2009	Tsunami 7x	Presenter		
2009	Malli Malli	Presenter		
2009	Target	Presenter		
2010	Dammunnodu	Presenter		
2010	Gaali Seenu	Presenter		
