= Ajay (actor) =

Indian actor

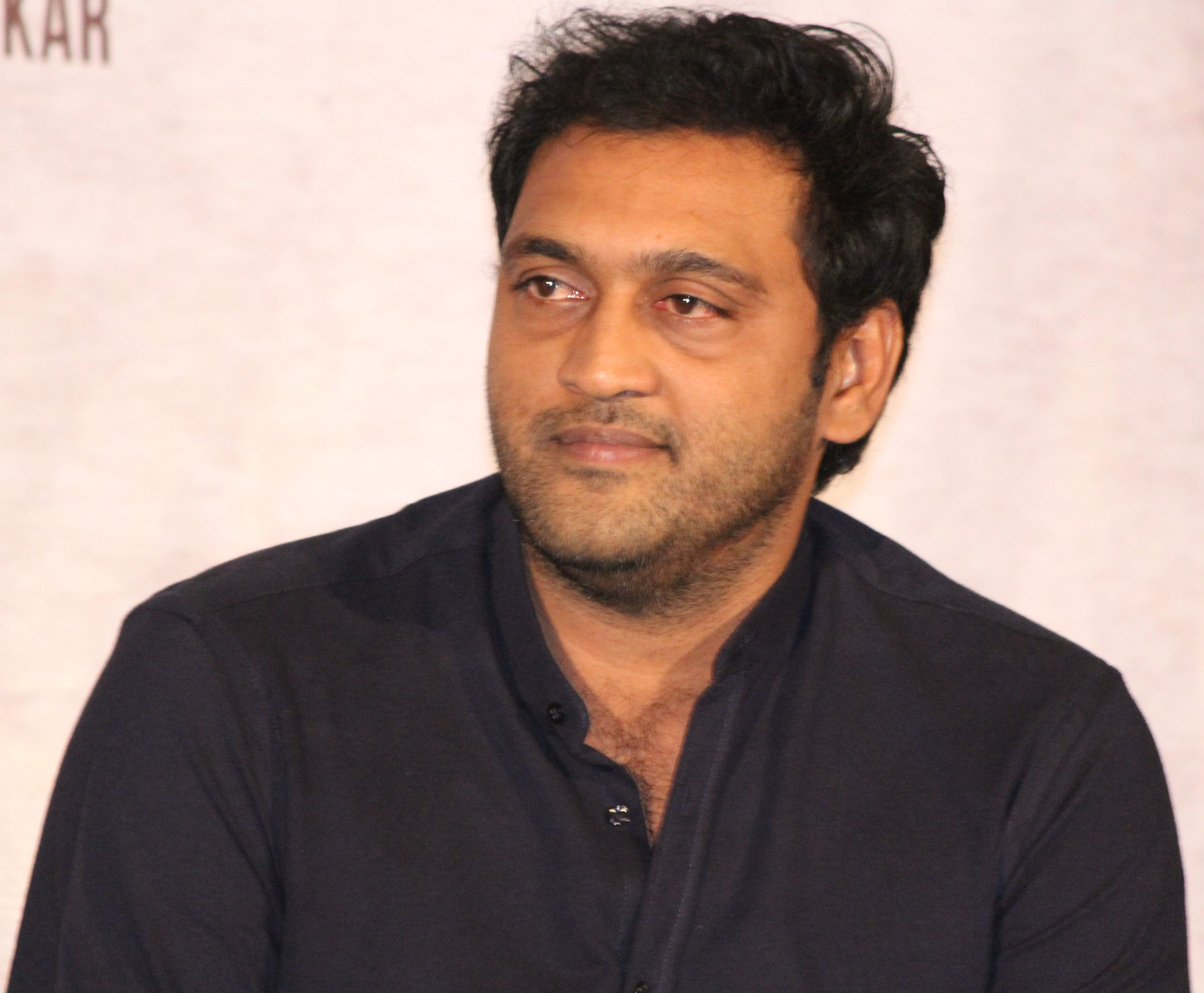
- Ajay in 2015
- Born: Vijayawada, Andhra Pradesh, India
- Occupation: Actor
- Years active: 2000–present
- Spouse: Swetha Ravuri (m. 2005)
- Children: 2

Ajay Ravuri is an Indian actor known for his work primarily in Telugu cinema, with a few Tamil films to his credit.

== Career ==
Ajay played negative roles in several films including Vikramarkudu (2006) and Arya 2 (2009). He played the lead in two films in 2009: Aa Okkadu and Saarai Veerraju. However, both films were box office failures.

== Personal life ==
Ajay was born and brought up in Vijayawada. His family later moved to Hyderabad. Ajay married Swetha Ravuri in 2005 who entered the Mrs India Worldwide finals in 2017. The couple has two children.

== Filmography ==
Key
†	Denotes films that have not yet been released

=== Telugu ===
Year	Title	Role	Notes
2000	Kauravudu	Dattu's henchman	
2001	Timepass		
2001	Kushi	Sheru	
2001	Student No.1	Satya's Batchmate	
2002	Nee Sneham	College Student	
2003	Okkadu	Kumar	
2003	Simhadri		
2004	Varsham	Venkat's friend	
2004	Sye	Bhikshu Yadav's henchman	
2005	Success		
2005	Nuvvostanante Nenoddantana	The boy who blackmails Lalli	
2005	Veerabhadra	Peddiraju's brother	
2005	Athanokkade	Anna's brother	
2005	Athadu	Pratap Reddy	
2005	Sri	Ravi	
2005	Chatrapathi	Ajay	
2006	Pournami	Chandrakala's catcaller	
2006	Pokiri	Ajay	
2006	Seetharamudu		
2006	Vikramarkudu	Titla	
2006	Sainikudu	Ajay Kumar	
2007	Desamuduru	Sheru	
2007	Lakshmi Kalyanam	Giridhar	
2007	Dhee	Ballu's brother	
2007	Sri Mahalakshmi	Isra Qureshi	
2007	Bhayya		
2007	Athidhi	Kaiser's Brother	
2008	Ontari	Panda	
2008	Nagaram	Balu	
2008	Kalidasu	Ajay	
2008	Bujjigadu	Machi Reddy's son	
2008	Victory	Contract Killer	
2008	Gunde Jhallumandi	Ajay	
2008	Souryam	Ajay	
2008	Vaana	Johnny	
2008	Chintakayala Ravi	Ajay	
2008	Ninna Nedu Repu	Poorna	
2008	King	Kittu	
2009	Aa Okkadu	Bujji	
2009	Arya 2	Subbi Reddy	
2009	Saarai Veerraju	Veerraju	
2010	Kalavar King	Narender	
2010	Yagam		
2010	Sye Aata	Pandaa Mahadev	
2010	Gaayam 2	Aziz	
2010	Bhairava		
2010	Brindavaanam	Bhoomi's cousin	
2010	Kalyanram Kathi	Krishna Mohan's family member	
2011	Mirapakaay	Kittu's son	
2011	Vastadu Naa Raju	Ajay	
2011	Katha Screenplay Darsakatvam Appalaraju	K.T.	
2011	Dongala Mutha		
2011	Vykuntapali	Kranthi Kumar	
2011	Veera	Deva	
2011	Virodhi	Gogi	
2011	Oosaravelli		
2011	Daggaraga Dooranga		
2011	Raaj	Priya's former lover	
2011	Dookudu	Nayak's henchman & Ajay's colleague	
2011	Bejawada	Jaya Krishna	
2011	Rajanna	Rajanna's aide	
2011	Rakta Patham		
2012	Ishq	Siva	Nandi Award for Best Supporting Actor; Nominated−SIIMA Award for Best Actor in a Supporting Role
2012	Gabbar Singh	Gabbar Singh's brother	
2012	Uu Kodathara? Ulikki Padathara?	Mantrik	
2012	Damarukam		
2013	Mirchi	Manasa's brother	
2013	Ongole Gitta	Adikeshavulu's brother	
2013	Balupu	Babji	
2013	Baadshah	Baadshah's henchman	
2013	Ramayya Vasthavayya	Ramu's elder brother	
2013	Dalam		
2013	Bhai	Tony	
2013	Aadu Magaadra Bujji	Shankar Anna	
2013	Biskett		
2014	Legend	Jeetendra's brother	
2014	Yevadu	Ajay	
2014	Heart Attack	Amu	
2014	Autonagar Surya	Giri	
2014	Premalo ABC	J. Ranadheer	
2014	Rabhasa	Obul Reddy	
2014	Rough	Sooraj	
2014	Power	Kundan	
2014	Aagadu	Collector Bharath	
2014	Dikkulu Choodaku Ramayya	Gopala Krishna	
2014	Rowdy Fellow		
2014	Joru	Bhavani	
2015	Rudhramadevi	Prasad Adhitya	
2015	Subramanyam for Sale	Govind	
2015	Bhale Bhale Magadivoy	Ajay	
2016	Dictator	Inspector Prabhakar	
2016	Lacchimdeviki O Lekkundi	Mahesh	
2016	Appatlo Okadundevadu	Nadayar	
2016	Savitri	Dora Babu's brother	
2016	Okka Ammayi Thappa	Krishna's brother	
2016	Janatha Garage	Bose	
2016	Thikka	Sadhu Bhai	
2016	Siddhartha		
2016	A Aa	Nagavalli's brother	
2017	Om Namo Venkatesaya	Garuda	
2017	Venkatapuram	Ajay	
2017	Katamarayudu	Konda Babu	
2017	Goutham Nanda	Borabanda Bujji Yadav	
2017	Keshava	Nakul	
2017	LIE	Ajay	
2017	Nene Raju Nene Mantri	Hema Chander	
2017	Balakrishnudu	Pratap Reddy	
2017	Hello	Rishi	
2018	Agnyaathavaasi	Aditya Bandaru	
2018	Touch Chesi Chudu	Police Officer	
2018	MLA	Marthaali	
2018	Bharat Ane Nenu	Arvind Krishna	
2018	Officer	Prasad	
2018	Nela Ticket	Anwar	
2018	Pantham	Naayak's client	
2018	Lover	Bhai	
2018	Ego	DCP	
2018	Srinivasa Kalyanam	Ajay	
2018	Nartanasala	Satya's brother	
2018	Kavacham	Ajay Bhupati	
2018	Padi Padi Leche Manasu	Dr. Rakesh	
2019	Mr. Majnu	Local Goon	
2019	Special		
2019	Ranarangam	Sanjay	
2019	90ML	Seshu	
2019	Prati Roju Pandage	Nagaraju	
2019	Mathu Vadalara	Tejaswi Thota	
2020	Ala Vaikunthapurramuloo	Appala Naidu's brother-in-law	
2020	Sarileru Neekevvaru	Nagendra's Henchman	
2020	Bheeshma	Ajay Varma	
2020	Dirty Hari	Police Officer	
2020	Solo Brathuke So Better	Ravanudu	
2021	Super Over	Ajay	
2021	April 28 Em Jarigindi		
2021	Power Play		
2021	Thellavarithe Guruvaram		
2021	Sashi	Ajay	
2021	Ardha Shathabdham	Ravinder	
2021	Thimmarusu: Assignment Vali	Bhupati Raju	
2021	Most Eligible Bachelor	Harsha's brother-in-law	
2021	Anubhavinchu Raja		
2021	Pushpa: The Rise	Molleti Mohan Rao	
2022	Hero	Police CI	
2022	Super Machi		
2022	69 Sanskar Colony		
2022	Blood Mary	CI Prabhakar	
2022	Acharya	Vedanna	
2022	Sarkaru Vaari Paata	ACP Ajay Kumar	
2022	The Warriorr	Ravi	
2022	18 Pages	Rakesh Talwar	
2023	Chakravyuham:The Trap	CI Satyanarayana	
2023	Das Ka Dhamki	Dhanunjay	
2023	Virupaksha	Aghora	
2023	Mama Mascheendra	Bhanu Prasad and Prasad	Dual role
2023	Rules Ranjann	Swapna's brother	
2023	Extra Ordinary Man	Traffic Police Officer Bhaskar	
2024	Guntur Kaaram	Gelatin Babji	
2024	Prathinidhi 2	Prabhat Mishra	
2024	Maruthi Nagar Subramanyam	Bhupathi	
2024	Saripodhaa Sanivaaram	Govardhan	
2024	Mathu Vadalara 2	Tejeswi Thota, Aakash	
2024	Devara: Part 1	Officer Shivam	
2024	Pottel	Patel	
2024	KA	Gurunadham's son-in-law	
2024	Appudo Ippudo Eppudo	Munna	
2024	Pushpa 2: The Rule	Molleti Mohan Rao	
2025	Thala		
2025	Mazaka	Ajay	
2025	Bhairavam	Nagaraju	
2025	Sundarakanda	Shiva	
2025	K-Ramp	Albert Joy	
2025	Vrusshabha	Pashupathi	Partially reshot in Malayalam
2026	Bad Boy Karthik	Kasthuri’s husband	
2026	Jetlee	Dharmesh Prajapathi	
2026	Srinivasa Mangapuram		

=== Tamil ===
Year	Title	Role	Notes
2007	Kireedam	Varadarajan	
2007	Malaikottai	Guna	
2008	Netru Indru Naalai	"Bullet" Poorana	
2009	Sindhanai Sei	Police Inspector	
2011	Velayudham	Ulaganathan's partner	
2014	Koottam		
2015	10 Endrathukulla	Telangana Don	
2016	Uyire Uyire	Shiva	
2016	24	Mithran (Viraj)	
2019	Bodhai Yeri Budhi Maari	Commissioner	
2022	The Warriorr	Ravi	
2022	Gatta Kusthi	Daas	
2023	Thunivu	Ramachandran	
2024	Siren	Anbazhagan (Anbu)	
2025	Coolie	Xavier	
2026	Ananthan Kaadu	Srilankan Commander	Bilingual film
2026	Magudam	Chera	

=== Kannada ===
Year	Title	Role	Notes
2008	Satya in Love		
2008	Citizen		
2008	Arjun	Ajaya	
2009	Vayuputra	Punja	
2011	Saarathi	Pratap	
2012	Katari Veera Surasundarangi		
2013	Myna	Anirudh Desai	
2013	Brindavana	Varadha	

=== Malayalam ===
Year	Title	Role	Notes
2025	Vrusshabha	Pashupathi	Partially reshot version
2026	Ananthan Kaadu	Srilankan Commander	Bilingual film

=== As voice actor ===
- Keka (2008) for Anoop Kumar
- Yentabadu Gani (2015) for Arun Vijay (Dubbed version)
- Animal (2023) for Siddharth Karnick (Telugu dubbed version)

=== Television ===
Year	Title	Role	Network	Notes
2021	Unheard	Mallesh	Disney+ Hotstar	
2022	9 Hours	Dasarath Ramayya	Disney+ Hotstar	
2024	Yakshini	Mahakal	Disney+ Hotstar	
