= Atluri Purnachandra Rao =

Indian film producer and communist leader

Atluri Poornachandra Rao
- Born: 15 February 1936 (age 90); Chowtapalli village, Krishna district, Andhra Pradesh, India
- Occupations: Film producer, Communist leader
- Spouse: Marudwati
- Children: 2

Atluri Poornachandra Rao (c. 1936) is an Indian film producer for predominantly Telugu and Hindi films and a communist leader. As a film producer he produced 87 films in 9 languages between 1960s till 2020. Aadabaduchu (1967), Mathrudevata (1969), Sthree (1972), were some of his notable films.

== Early life ==
Purnachandra Rao is born in a middle-class family on 15 February 1936 in chowtapalli village in Krishna district of Andhra Pradesh. He moved to Hyderabad in late 1950s and shifted to Chennai later to pursue a career in films. He married Marudwati and the couple has two sons.

He was influenced by left ideology and participated in the rationalist movement led by Gora. He was a member of united Communist Party and was arrested multiple times.

== Filmography ==
=== Telugu films ===
- Aada Paduchu (1967)
- Mathru Devata (1969)
- Koothuru Kodalu (1971)
- Papam Pasivadu (1972)
- Sthree (1973)
- Devudu Chesina Pelli (1974)
- Ram Balram (1980)
- Chattaniki Kallu Levu (1981)
- Mugguru Monagallu (1983)
- Aaplee Maanse (1992)
- Prema Pusthakam (1993)
- Kothachilo (1994)
- Akuha Katha (1994)
- Venky (2004)
- Mr & Mrs Sailaja Krishnamurthy (2004)
- Avunanna Kadanna (2005)

=== Hindi films ===
- Maang Bharo Sajana (1980)
- Ek Hi Bhool (1981)
- Andhaa Kaanoon (1983)
- John Jani Janardhan (1984)
- Aakhree Raasta (1986)
- Sansar (1987)
- ChaalBaaz (1989)

=== Tamil films ===
Note: for other films, see T. Rama Rao.

- Naan Sigappu Manithan (1985)
- Athisaya Piravi (1990)
- Naattai Thirudathe (1991)
