= Nene Raju Nene Mantri =

- Theatrical release poster
- Directed by: Teja
- Written by: Lakshmi Bhupal (dialogues)
- Screenplay by: Teja
- Story by: Teja
- Produced by: D. Suresh Babu; Kiran Reddy; Bharath Chowdary
- Starring: Rana Daggubati; Kajal Aggarwal; Catherine Tresa; Navdeep; Ashutosh Rana
- Cinematography: Venkat Dilip Chunduru
- Edited by: Kotagiri Venkateswara Rao
- Music by: Anup Rubens
- Production companies: Suresh Productions; Blue Planet Entertainments LLP
- Distributed by: Suresh Productions
- Release date: 11 August 2017
- Running time: 153 minutes
- Country: India
- Language: Telugu
- Budget: ₹12 crore
- Box office: est.₹45 crore

Nene Raju Nene Mantri (transl. I'm the King and I'm the Minister) is a 2017 Indian Telugu-language political action drama film written and directed by Teja, featuring Rana Daggubati and Kajal Aggarwal in the lead roles along with Catherine Tresa, Navdeep, and Ashutosh Rana in other pivotal roles.

Production began in April 2016 and principal photography commenced in October 2016 in Karaikudi. The teaser was released on June 6, coinciding with the 81st birthday anniversary of D. Ramanaidu, Rana's grandfather. A special teaser celebrating 50 films of Kajal Aggarwal was released on her birthday, June 19. The film was dubbed in Hindi as Main Hi Raja Main Hi Mantri, Tamil as Naan Aanaiyittaal and Malayalam as Raaja Kireedam. The Tamil version featured scenes re-shot with local actors.

It released on 11 August 2017 to positive reviews and was considered as a comeback film for Teja. The film was a blockbuster at the box office.

== Plot ==
Jogendra, a money lender, and Radha are a happily married couple; however, they do not have any children. When Radha finally gets pregnant, they are overjoyed. When they go to the temple to pray for the well-being of the baby, Radha lights a holy lamp. Sarpanch, the leader of the village that they live in, comes along to the temple with his wife. His wife sees that Radha lit the lamp and becomes infuriated as she is always the one who does it. She pushes Radha down the steps of the temple, and Radha has a miscarriage. Both Radha and Jogendra are devastated.

Jogendra goes to Sarpanch's house and persuades him to let him join in his political campaign. Jogendra cleverly wins, and this angers Sarpanch. Sarpanch tries to kill Jogendra, but Jogendra shoots Sarpanch when he mentions that he will also kill Radha. Later, Hema Chander, the policeman who was to give Jogendra an FIR copy for killing Sarpanch in self-defense, asks him for Rs. 5 million for his sister's marriage in return. Jogendra, however, is not willing to give the amount. He then takes Hema Chander's pistol, shoots his hands, and puts the blame on Hema Chander. MLA Choudappa, who was supporting Jogendra for his party, asks him an amount of Rs. 1 crore and takes the FIR copy. When Jogendra tells Choudappa that he is unable to arrange the money, Choudappa asks Jogendra to send Radha to his guest house. Upon hearing this, a frustrated Jogendra kills Choudappa. After Choudappa's death, he stands in the MLA election and defeats Choudappa's brother (who was his opposite party candidate in the election) by framing him that he killed his brother to become MLA. He also makes Choudappa's wife believe it and have her support him. With the help of sympathy, he wins the election.

Now, Jogendra is the MLA and dreams of leading the best life. He becomes big by killing his enemies and anyone in his way. He invests in lots of businesses (transport, liquor shops, institutions, hospitals). Meanwhile, he had recommended a student for a job who does not get one because his recommendation does not work as another student gets a letter from a State Minister. Jogendra plans to become a minister and goes to the student who wants to commit suicide by climbing up a building and is about to jump. The student's mother slaps him, and the student comes down. Jogendra asks the student union to go on a hunger strike. He then visits the CM and gives him the idea to end this strike and, in turn, asks for the minister post, which the CM rejects. He then visits the Home Minister Subbarayudu, whom he convinces to mix poison in the nimbu pani, which the CM was to come and give to the student. In turn, he asks for the minister post, to which Subbarayudu agrees. When the CM comes to give nimbu pani, Jogendra cleverly tells that there is poison in the drink. Accordingly, the blame falls on Subbarayudu, and he is arrested. Then the scene shifts, and the CM congratulates Jogendra and gives him sanskritik shakha ministry (Ministry of Cultural Affairs), which Jogendra rejects and asks the CM to choose wisely as he wants home ministry.

Meanwhile, Devika Rani, a journalist, does research about Jogendra. She finds out all the evidence to sue him because she works for the opposing party and telecasts it on her channel. He confronts her at her house. When she tells him that his entire house is filled with cameras, he seduces her, and they have sex. They begin an affair, and she falls in love with him, but he does this only to find out information. He still loves Radha. After this, Devika, with the help of Subbarayudu (who is now out of jail on bail), plans against Jogendra. All of Jogendra's illegal activities are exposed, and he loses everything. He and Radha visit the temple along with Shiva's brother. (Shiva was a close associate of Jogendra, whom he killed in rage as he thought he went against him due to a false video planted by Subbarayudu. Jogendra later regrets killing him.) Shiva's brother plants a bomb on the route, and it explodes in which Radha is also injured. Jogendra saves her and takes her to the hospital. However, Radha sacrifices her life so that Jogendra can gain sympathy and his party can win elections so that he becomes CM. It happens so, and a day before, Hema Chander cleverly gets all secrets leaked, and falsefully whomsoever had won from Jogendra's party is offered bribe money to go and join Subbarayudu. Jogendra goes to the place where all MLAs and ministers are there, and gets to plant a bomb, which eventually explodes and kills everyone.

The story then comes to the present in the jail where Jogendra is giving the interview. Then, a lot of people support him upon listening to his story and want only Jogendra to become the CM. People use social media and messages to plead not guilty and ask for his release from hanging. The President of India cancels his hanging, and just at the right time, the prison warden arrives, and Jogendra's hanging is stopped. On live TV, Jogendra asks people to choose a person who is really good and wants to do better for people and not any corrupt leader or someone who influences them. He asks the voters to choose wisely and poll wisely. In the last scene, Jogendra lights a cigarette and tells everyone that his name is now "Radha Jogendra", and without Radha, he cannot exist. Saying this, he hangs himself and dies.

In the credits scene, Radha is shown sitting on a swing, and Jogendra comes to her and shows his love, which ultimately shows their reunion in heaven.

== Cast ==
- Rana Daggubati as Jogendra
  - Master Ryan Joy as Young Jogendra
- Kajal Aggarwal as Radha
  - Baby Aishwarya as Young Radha
- Catherine Tresa as Devika Rani (Voice over 'Anjali')
- Navdeep as Shiva
- Ashutosh Rana as Sarpanch Subbarayudu
- Pradeep Rawat as Ramasubbayya
- Sivaji Raja as Srinivas
- Tanikella Bharani as Chief Minister
- Jaya Prakash Reddy as Jailer
- Posani Krishna Murali as Muniappa
- Ajay as Hemachandra
- Paruchuri Venkateswara Rao as Lawyer Venkatachalam
- Satya Prakash as MLA Choudappa
- Meena Kumari as Choudappa's wife
- Raghu Karumanchi as Chandramouli
- Prabhas Sreenu as Subbarayudu's PA
- Bithiri Sathi as News Reporter Sathi
- Bindu Chandramouli as Sarpanch's wife
- Naveen Neni as Ravi
- Josh Ravi as Tirupathi
- Annapurna
- Chitram Seenu as Constable D. Sahu
- Priyanka Nalkari as Sushmitha
- K. Sivasankar (special appearance in the song "Radhamma Radhamma")
- Kalpa Latha
- Venu Yeldandi as Villager
- Racha Ravi as Villager
- Allari Subhashini as Villager
- iDream TNR as Tailor
- Mahesh Kathi as Roadside vendor

== Production ==
In February 2016, filmmaker Teja signed Telugu actor Rajasekhar to play a negative role in his directorial Aham. Sneha was approached to play the female lead in the film. It was shelved in April 2016 due to both creative and personal differences. P. Satyanarayana Reddy, the film's producer, wanted another actor to play the lead role. Teja approached Rana Daggubati and gained his consent. Rana's father Daggubati Suresh Babu suggested Kajal Aggarwal for the female lead role, who was signed later. Daggubati was completing his portions in The Ghazi Attack (2017) and was about to join the sets of Baahubali 2: The Conclusion when Teja approached him. They worked on the script for eight months, writing different versions. Lyricist Lakshmi Bhoopal, who was supposed to work with Teja for three of his earlier films, was chosen to pen the dialogues. Teja also approached R. Rathnavelu to handle the film's cinematography.

The film was titled Nene Raju Nene Mantri; Venkat C. Dileep and Kotagiri Venkateswara Rao were recruited as the cinematographer and editor respectively. Anoop Rubens composed the film's soundtrack and background score. Babu, along with Kiran Reddy and Bharath Chowdary, jointly bankrolled the film under their banners Suresh Productions and Blue Planet Entertainments. Nene Raju Nene Mantri was Aggarwal's 50th film as an actor. Catherine Tresa, Navdeep and Ashutosh Rana were cast in supporting roles.

== Soundtrack ==
Nene Raju Nene Mantri

Soundtrack album by Anup Rubens
- Released: 30 July 2017
- Recorded: 2016
- Genre: Soundtrack
- Length: 18:02
- Label: Junglee Music
- Producer: Anup Rubens

Anup Rubens chronology
Katamarayudu (2017)	Nene Raju Nene Mantri (2017)	Paisa Vasool (2017)

The soundtrack album was composed by Anup Rubens, and released on 30 July 2017 by Junglee Music.

=== Telugu Original Tracklist ===
No.	Title	Lyrics	Singer(s)	Length
1.	"Devuditho Samaram"	Lakshmi Bhupal, Surendra Krishna	Anoop Rubens	3:28
2.	"Jogendra Jodendra"	Surendra Krishna	Master Rishon Rubens, Divya	1:28
3.	"Kathulatho"	Lakshmi Bhupal	Anoop Rubens	2:14
4.	"Radhamma Radhamma"	Surendra Krishna	Vijay Yesudas, Ramya Behara	4:17
5.	"Sukhibhava Annara"	Surendra Krishna	Shreya Ghoshal, Rohith	4:15
6.	"Sumangalai"	Surendra Krishna	Sravani	2:24
Total length:				18:02

=== Tamil Tracklist ===
All music is composed by Anup Rubens.

Naan Aanaiyittaal (Dubbed Version)
No.	Title	Length
1.	"Nalla Iru"	4:17
2.	"Jogendra Jodendra"	1:20
3.	"Sodhanaiya Payanam"	3:20
4.	"Radhamma"	4:17
5.	"Vazhkaiye Irundu"	2:23
6.	"Kathigalai Uruvu"	2:24

== Critical reception ==
Purnima Sriram Iyer of The New Indian Express termed Nene Raju Nene Mantri a "riveting political drama"; Iyer found the narration "gripping and enthralling" and the dialogues "hard-hitting". She added that Teja writing was effective enough to let even a politically-ignorant person "enlightened about the subject". Hemanth Kumar, writing for Firstpost, called Nene Raju Nene Mantri the "cinematic equivalent of Newton's Third Law of Physics" where "every action is met with an equal and opposite reaction". Kumar noted that the leads' performances and Teja's writing are the film's strengths, adding that Aggarwal's portrayal of Radha was the "biggest revelation". Karthik Kumar of Hindustan Times noted that the entire film is built on the bonding between the lead characters, with the political backdrop used only "to give the story a solid padding". Kumar was appreciative of Daggubati's performance: "[His] powerful screen presence takes everything up a notch and it's a treat to watch him turn from good to grey." Suresh Kavirayani of Deccan Chronicle praised the performances and the portrayal of emotions such as love, hatred, smartness and cruelty handled by Jogendra. He, however, felt that the second half suffered from an "overdose of sentiment".

Writing for The Hindu, Sangeetha Devi Dundoo opined that the film's later segments lacked the sharpness of the initial moments. She termed Jogendra as one of the "most intriguing characters Rana [Daggubati] has played" and found its actions troubling the narrative. Neeshita Nyayapati, reviewing for The Times of India, found Nene Raju Nene Mantri a good love story of Radha and Jogendra than an effective political drama; she stated that the political angle "seems like a pesky annoyance in an otherwise beautiful movie". Nyayapati was also critical of Rani's characterisation, calling it a "messy" one with "no thought put into it at all". Sify noted that the film turns "tedious and predictable" post intermission and criticised the script's lack of logic in the later portions. The reviewer added that Daggubati's portrayal of Jogendra was a "stunning act" and "very intense" in crucial scenes.

Criticising the lack of cohesiveness, Nagarjuna Rao of Gulf News added that the addition of few irrelevant characters and implausible situations in the later portions "drain the viewer much before the climax, which turns out to be a denouement". Rao also found Rubens' score "too loud, to the point of being irritating". Manoj Kumar R, writing for The Indian Express, was critical of Teja's direction. He found the climax "cringe worthy" because of Teja's attempt to "underplay the gravity of crimes Jogendra committed". He also added that Teja's reservations failed to give Rana's character a logical conclusion. K. Naresh Kumar of The Hans India found the film a "patchy effort" and criticised its indifferent treatment: "Building up the hero as a crusader for the common man, despite his questionable and violent tactics in retaining his political status is the main contradiction that one feels, the film suffers from." Sowmya Rajendran of The News Minute opined that the narrative "simply does not hold together" and found the CGI "patchy". Rajendran too felt that the film doesn't allow Jogendra's devolution "to really punch [the viewers] in the gut, because it wants to simultaneously hail him as a hero."

== Awards ==
Event	Category	Recipient	Result	Ref.
Zee Golden Awards 2017	Favorite Heroine Of The Year	Kajal Aggarwal (also for Khaidi No. 150)	Won	
