= Pen Singam =

- Directed by: Bali Srirangham
- Written by: M. Karunanidhi
- Produced by: S. P. Murugesan
- Starring: Uday Kiran; Meera Jasmine; Richard; Rambha; Sudharsana Sen
- Cinematography: Vijay Ragav
- Music by: Deva
- Release date: 3 June 2010
- Country: India
- Language: Tamil

Pen Singam (transl. Lioness) is a 2010 Indian Tamil-language film directed by Bali Srirangam and produced by S. P. Murugesan. The film, based on M. Karunanidhi's novel Surulimalai, stars Uday Kiran, Meera Jasmine, Richard, Rambha, and debutant Sudharsana Sen, while Vivek and Radha Ravi play supporting roles. The music was composed by Deva with cinematography by Vijay Ragav. The film released on 3 June 2010, coinciding with Karunanidhi's 87th birthday. The film also marked the final Tamil film of actress Rambha.

== Plot ==
Surya (Uday Kiran) and Nagendran (Richard) are friends. Surya runs into a problem with Simha Perumal (Radha Ravi) and his gang. Nagendran makes a speech about a woman's way of getting married off with no dowry, as a woman's way of getting married is education, so Mythilli (Rambha) falls for him. Mythilli is a rich daughter of an inherited father. Surya and his mother help Nagendran get married. On Nagendran and Mythilli's first night, he demands her to give him money. Mythilli is shocked to find out that Nagendran is not the man of her dreams. She made a cheque but cancelled it, so Nagendran blackmails her by using the pictures. Surya is shocked that Nagendran has been a bad friend all his life. Nagendran invites Simha Perumal and his gang for a drinking party. Mythilli called Surya to stop him. There, Nagendran and Mythilli started to fight. In the melee, Simha Perumal's gang shut down the power, Mythilli was on the floor shot in the head, and there was a gun in Surya's hand. Surya was confused as to how the gun got in his hand. He is accused of shooting Mythilli. Meanwhile, Meghala (Meera Jasmine) is on the case of Mythilli's death. What is Surya's fate like after?

== Cast ==
- Uday Kiran as Surya
- Meera Jasmine as Meghala
- Richard as Nagendran
- Rambha as Mythilli
- Sudharsana Sen as Prabhavathy
- Vivek as Thirupathi
- Radha Ravi as Simha Perumal
- Rohini as Chandramathi (Surya's mother)
- Thalaivasal Vijay as Malaisami
- O. A. K. Sundar as Inspector Parasuraman
- Vagai Chandrasekar
- Nizhalgal Ravi as Police Commissioner
- Madhan Bob as Police Constable
- Manikka Vinayagam as Meghala's father
- Y. Gee. Mahendra
- Besant Ravi
- Raviraj as Police officer
- J. K. Rithesh as Advocate
- Raghava Lawrence (special appearance in the song "Adi Aadi Asaiyum Edupu")
- Lakshmi Rai (item number in the song "Adi Aadi Asaiyum Edupu")

== Production ==
The film was launched in 2008 under the title "Neeyindri Naanillai" with Ilavenil of Uliyin Osai being announced as director. In a sudden turn of events, Ilavenil was replaced by a newcomer, Bali Srirangam, and the film had undergone a change of title with the makers naming it as "Pen Singam". In this film, Meera Jasmine dons the role of an IPS officer for the first time in her career. The film is about women's fight for justice. Karthika is doing a prominent role in the film, as a police officer. Actor Richard is playing the role of an IFS officer in the film. Actress Rohini is playing the role of a Judge and Vivek will provide comedy sequences.

== Soundtrack ==
The music was composed by Deva and released by Sony Music India.

Pen Singam

Soundtrack album by Deva
- Released: 2010
- Recorded: 2010
- Genre: Soundtrack
- Length: 27:30
- Label: Sony Music India
- Producer: Deva

Deva chronology
Sivappu Mazhai (2010)	Pen Singam (2010)	Kutti Pisasu (2010)

Track list
No.	Title	Lyrics	Singer(s)	Length
1.	"Poo Pookkum Satham"	Vairamuthu	Sadhana Sargam	5:23
2.	"Aaha Veenaiyil eludhu"	Kalaignar	S. P. Balasubrahmanyam, K. S. Chithra	5:02
3.	"Kalyanam Aagadha Penne"	Bharathidasan	S. P. Balasubrahmanyam	2:13
4.	"Sil Silla Sil Silla"	Pa. Vijay	Anuradha Sriram, Shankar Mahadevan	4:02
5.	"Nee Sonnal Theipirai"	Vairamuthu	Hariharan, Madhumitha	4:56
6.	"Adi Aadi Asaiyum edupu"	Vaali	Naveen	5:36
Total length:				27:30

== Critical reception ==
Rediff.com noted "Technically, the film manages to scrape through; it's the script that stumbles and almost grinds to a halt frequently, while the cast itself looks clueless and plain out of it, at times. Logic has gone for a toss as well and of reason, there's very little". Times of India wrote "Decades ago when Muthuvel Karunanidhi’s dialogues hit the silver screen, they were agents of change, awakening social consciousness. His latest film, which released on his 87th birthday, was hyped as a contemporary film. However, although the film deals with current day issues [..], the dialogues are sorely lacking in the criticism and searing commentary of his early writings. Unlike his dialogues in films like ‘Parasakthi’ which moved audi-ences and inspired generations, this one is as awe inspiring as a zoo lion. To a large extent, the film's failure is also due to terrible act-ing by the lead pair". Hindustan Times wrote "The scripting and direction are so casual that the film often appears jerky, and with performances that are terribly amateurish, Penn Singam is awfully disappointing".
