= Aa Okkadu =

- Directed by: N. S. Murthy (Dakshin Srinivas)
- Written by: N. S. Murthy (Dakshin Srinivas)
- Produced by: Ganesh Indukuri
- Starring: Suresh Gopi; Ajay; Madhurima
- Cinematography: Kamalakar
- Edited by: M. R. Varma
- Music by: Mani Sharma
- Release date: 5 June 2009
- Country: India
- Language: Telugu

Aa Okkadu is a 2009 Indian Telugu-language action thriller film starring Suresh Gopi, Ajay, and Madhurima. The film is directed by N S Murthy and was released by Tolly 2 Holly Films on 5 June 2009. Mani Sharma composed the music. The New Indian Express categorised this film as one of the commercially unsuccessful films of 2009.

== Plot ==
Sri Krishna (Suresh Gopi) is a successful criminal lawyer. Bujji (Ajay) works under Sri Krishna. Dr. Pavitra (Madhurima) is a psychiatrist who works in a mental hospital. Sri Krishna and Pavitra are disciples of a godman. Pavitra has a family dispute with her brother-in-law and he dies under suspicious circumstances. Slowly a few people associated with Pavitra are killed and the needle of suspicion turns towards Pavitra. The rest of the film is all about who did it.

== Cast ==
- Suresh Gopi as Adv. Sri Krishna
- Ajay as Bujji
- Nyra Banerjee as Dr. Pavithra
- Nassar as Police Officer
- Sai Srujan Pelluri as Soori
- Vijayachander as Judge
- Sunil
- Dharmavarapu Subramanyam
- M. S. Narayana
- Anupama Kumar as Sri Krishna's wife
- Jenny
- Master Bharath
- Avinash as Swamy
- Sasidhar Kosuri as Police Officer
- Rachana Maurya (Item song "Moothimeediki")

== Soundtrack ==
Aa Okkadu

Soundtrack album by Mani Sharma
- Released: 2009
- Genre: Soundtrack
- Length: 21:24
- Label: Lahari Music

The music was composed by Mani Sharma. In an audio review of the film by Telugucinema.com, a critic rated the soundtrack three-and-a-half out of five and wrote that "At the outset, the album might seem to offer nothing new but Mani Sarma's careful handling of orchestration and tuning stand out on repeated hearing".

Track-List
No.	Title	Lyrics	Singer(s)	Length
1.	"Radhaa Maanasa"	Veda Vyas	Dr. Naarayan	4:39
2.	"Moothimeediki"	Bhaskarabhatla	Suchitra	4:32
3.	"Ooruko Manasaa"	Ananta Sriram	Vijay Yesudas	4:06
4.	"Adedole"	Bhaskarabhatla	Ranjith, Jyotsna	3:57
5.	"Padalemuraa"	Sahithi	Ranjith, Rahul	4:28
Total length:				21:24

== Reception ==
Jeevi of Idlebrain rated the film two and one-fourth out of five and wrote that "On a whole, Aa Okkadu is a well-intended effort that has gone wrong due to inefficient screenplay and uninteresting narration."

A critic from Bangalore Mirror wrote that "Director Murthy has succeeded in holding the suspense till the end but the comedy sequences do not blend well with the main story. Many of the plots lack logic too. Even Mani Sharma's music fails to impress."
