= Teja (director) =

Indian cinematographer turned director (born 1966)

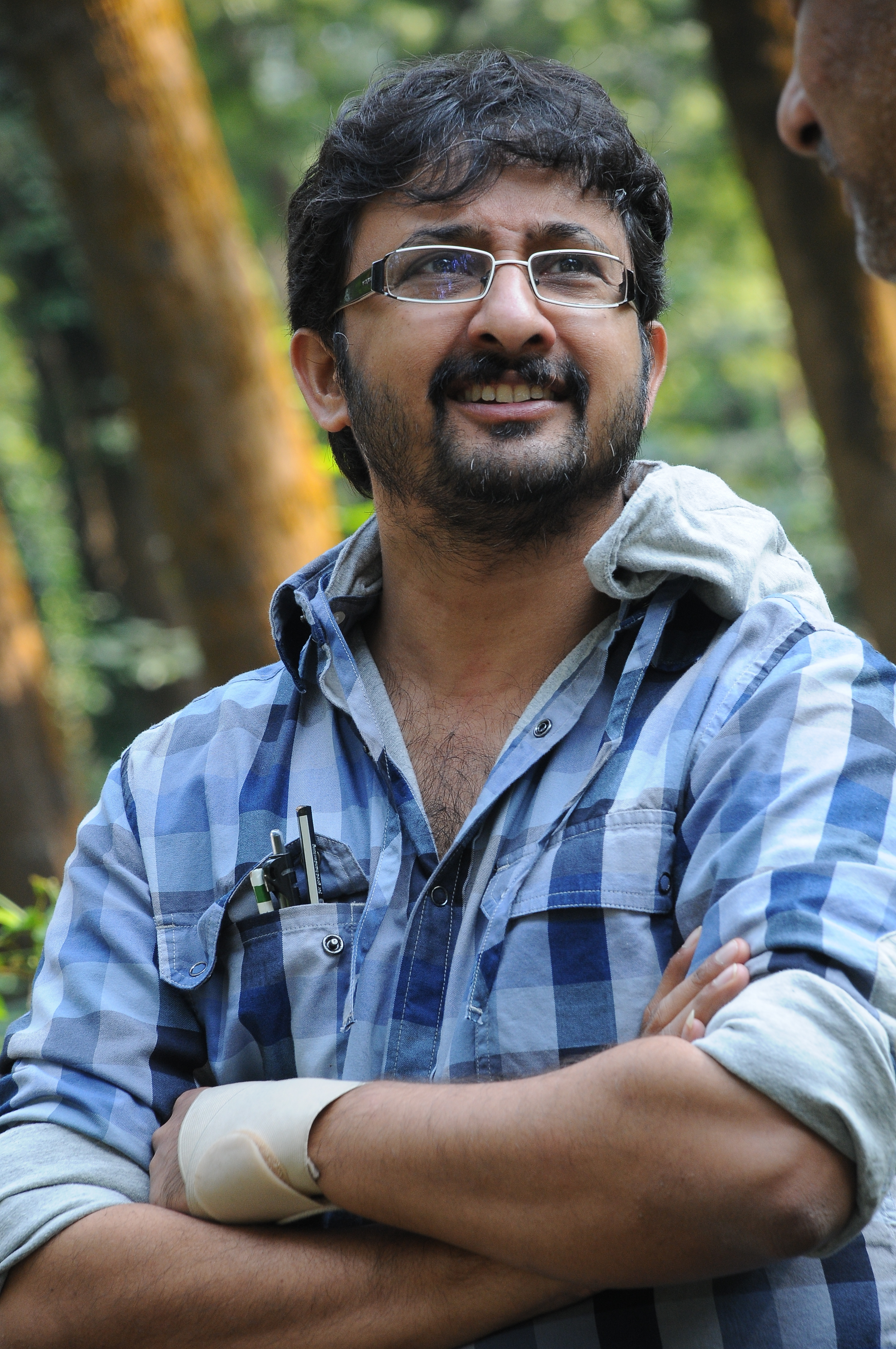
- Teja at a shoot in the Maldives in 2011
- Born: Jasti Dharma Teja; 22 February 1966 (age 60); Madras, Madras State, India
- Occupations: Cinematographer; director; screenwriter; producer
- Years active: 1985–present
- Spouse: Srivalli
- Children: 3, including Amitov

Teja (born Jasti Dharma Teja; 22 February 1966) is an Indian director, cinematographer, screenwriter, and producer known for his work primarily in Telugu cinema. He is a recipient of a Nandi Award for Best Director and a Filmfare Award for Best Director – Telugu.

He began his career as a cinematographer with Ram Gopal Varma's bilingual film Raat (1992). He went on to work on over ten films in Hindi and Telugu, including Money (1993), Tere Mere Sapne (1996), Ghulam (1998), Sangharsh (1999), and Krodh (2000).

Teja transitioned to direction and initially gained recognition for making low-budget romantic dramas that became highly successful. He made his directorial debut with Chitram (2000), followed by Nuvvu Nenu (2001) and Jayam (2002), which earned him further acclaim. His other notable films include Avunanna Kaadanna (2005) and Nene Raju Nene Mantri (2017).

== Early life ==
Teja was born on 22 February 1966 in Madras (now Chennai) of Tamil Nadu to an affluent family. His father J.B.K. Chowdhary was an industrialist and exporter, based primarily in Tokyo, Japan. Chowdhary suffered heavy losses in business which forced Teja to start working at an early age.

Teja identifies himself as anti-caste, anti-religion, and anti-region, which is why he has legally dropped his surname.

== Career ==
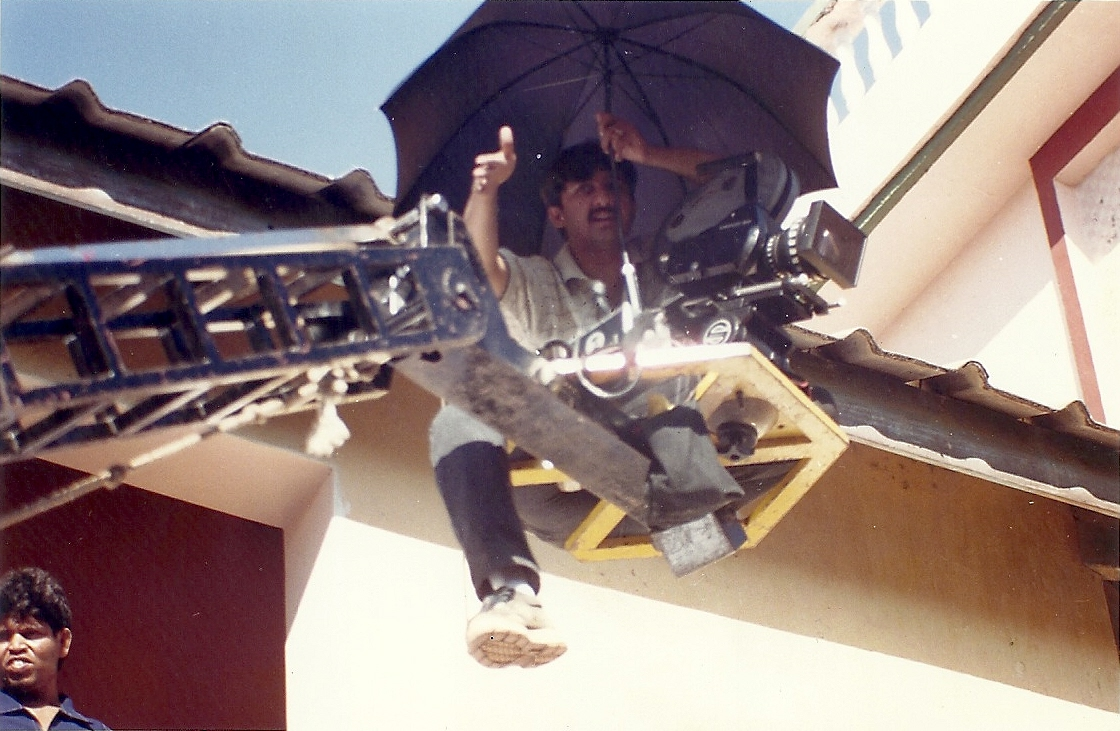
Teja in 1998, shooting for Bollywood film, Ghulam

Teja started by doing any work he could get, and ended up working in Tamil film shoots as a lighting assistant. After working in lighting and sound departments he moved into the camera department and worked under Ravikant Nagaich, and W.B. Rao. He then took up assignments for documentaries presented in National Geographic Channel. He then joined the bandwagon of Bollywood. Teja also worked as a crew member in films such as Kshana Kshanam, Rangeela, Drohi, Antham, Gaayam, and Govinda Govinda.

Working as cinematographer, Teja used to frequently schedule Hindi film shoots in Hyderabad, Andhra Pradesh as to spend more time with his wife and son. Many schedules were planned in Ramoji Film City. Chitram, Teja's directorial debut was planned entirely in Ramoji Film City on budget of forty lakh rupees. The film became a huge hit and paved way for a variety of new age romantic films in Tollywood. Teja gained notability post the release of Nuvvu Nenu, an all-time blockbuster and one of year's highest grosser. The film received six Nandi Awards and had a total run of three seventy five days. The film was also remade in Hindi starring Tushar Kapoor and Anita Hassanandani.

Teja's next film was Nijam, was released in 2003 starring Mahesh Babu and Rakshitha in lead roles. Nijam was a low grosser at the box office but gained critical appraise. In the following year, Teja made Jai. Actor Navdeep debuted with the film, he was paired with Santhoshini and Ayesha Jhulka. The film had an average run.

Teja later directed Dhairyam and Avunanna Kaadanna, simultaneously. Halfway through Dhairyam's shoot, Teja dropped the project stating that the producer, N. Sudhakar Reddy, Nithiin's father, had changed and edited a part of the film without his consent. Teja returned his remuneration, arranged a press meet, and declared that he had nothing to do with the film. Dhairyam failed at the box office, whereas Avunanna Kadanna had a seventy-five-day run and was declared a hit.

== Film distribution ==
Teja also set up Chitram movies distribution offices in Hyderabad and Vizag. He distributed films such as Harry Potter and the Order of the Phoenix, Harry Potter and the Goblet of Fire, Spider-Man 2, Spider-Man 3, Pirates of the Caribbean: At World's End, Pirates of the Caribbean: Dead Man's Chest, The Fast and the Furious: Tokyo Drift and many others in Telangana (Nizam) and other areas.

== Personal life ==
Aurov Teja, Teja's younger son, died of prolonged illness in Hyderabad on Saturday, 19 March 2011. Aurov had been suffering from breathing problems and cerebral palsy, caused by faulty medical procedures followed by the hospital at the time of birth. The baby was taken to Beijing, China, New York, United States and Berlin, Germany for medical treatment. On the morning of 19 March 2011, the baby's condition deteriorated and was pronounced dead at 12:11 local time.

== Filmography ==
=== As a cinematographer ===
Year	Film	Language	Notes	Ref.
1992	Raat	Telugu; Hindi	Bilingual films	
1992	Raatri	Telugu; Hindi	Bilingual films	
1992	Antham	Telugu; Hindi	Bilingual films	
1992	Drohi	Telugu; Hindi	Bilingual films	
1993	Money	Telugu		
1993	Rakshana	Telugu		
1994	Theerpu	Telugu		
1995	The Don	Hindi		
1995	Baazi	Hindi		
1996	Rakshak	Hindi		
1996	Tere Mere Sapne	Hindi		
1997	Vishwavidhaata	Hindi		
1998	Ghulam	Hindi		
1999	Sangharsh	Hindi		
2000	Jis Desh Mein Ganga Rehta Hain	Hindi		

=== As a film director ===
Year	Film	Language	Notes	Ref.
2000	Chitram	Telugu		
2001	Family Circus	Telugu		
2001	Nuvvu Nenu	Telugu		
2002	Jayam	Telugu		
2003	Yeh Dil	Hindi	Remake of Nuvvu Nenu	
2003	Nijam	Telugu		
2004	Jai	Telugu		
2005	Dhairyam	Telugu		
2005	Avunanna Kadanna	Telugu		
2006	Oka V Chitram	Telugu		
2007	Lakshmi Kalyanam	Telugu		
2008	Keka	Telugu		
2012	Neeku Naaku Dash Dash	Telugu		
2013	Veyyi Abaddalu	Telugu		
2015	Hora Hori	Telugu		
2017	Nene Raju Nene Mantri	Telugu		
2019	Sita	Telugu		
2023	Ahimsa	Telugu		

=== As a producer ===
Year	Film	Notes
2002	Jayam	
2003	Nijam	
2003	Sambaram	
2004	Jai	
2008	Keka	

=== As a writer ===
Year	Film	Writer	Language
2002	Pitaah	Story, screenplay	Hindi

== Awards ==
- Filmfare Award for Best Director – Telugu - Nuvvu Nenu
- Nandi Award for Best Director – Nuvvu Nenu
- CineMAA Award for Best Director - Jayam
