= Chitram =

Telugu movie

- DVD cover
- Directed by: Teja
- Written by: Teja
- Produced by: Ramoji Rao
- Starring: Uday Kiran; Reema Sen
- Cinematography: Rasool Ellore
- Edited by: Shankar
- Music by: R. P. Patnaik
- Production company: Usha Kiran Movies
- Release date: 16 June 2000
- Country: India
- Language: Telugu
- Budget: ₹42 lakh
- Box office: ₹12 crore distributors' share

Chitram (transl. Picture) is a 2000 Indian Telugu-language romantic comedy film written and directed by Teja. The film stars debutants Uday Kiran and Reema Sen in the lead roles. The music of the movie was composed by R. P. Patnaik. It was released on June 16, 2000, and received critical acclaim, as well as emerging as a blockbuster at the box office, collecting a distributor's share of ₹12 crore on a shoe-string budget of ₹42 lakh. It set the stage for the rise of Uday Kiran as a youth icon during the early 2000's along with being a breakthrough for the director Teja and the actress, Reema Sen. The film was produced by Ramoji Rao. Along with his other production, Nuvve Kavali, released later that year, Chitram was one of the biggest blockbusters for Telugu cinema during the early 2000's. The film was released as Chithiram in Tamil in 2001 with the film mostly featuring scenes dubbed from the original although scenes involving Manivannan and Senthil were added. The movie was remade in Kannada as Chitra and was a successful venture. The film ran for 100 days in 12 centers.

== Plot ==
Janaki and her sister are NRIs who want to join a PU college in AP. Janaki stays with her uncle and procures the admission in the same college as Ramana, a die-hard music fan. When Janaki first sees him in the music room practicing they get attracted to each other. When family members of Ramana are away, Janaki happens to come to Ramana's house wearing a saree. As she does not know how to drape a saree, all she does is wrap it around her body. Ramana offers to teach her how to wear a saree and accidentally puts his hand inside her slip which makes them feel shy and attracted. In the process they consummate their passion. After a few days Janaki informs Ramana that she is pregnant. Ramana, along with his friends, hires a nurse to perform abortion on Janaki. When Ramana asks Janaki to prepare for the abortion, she refuses to do so as she says she wants the company of a child. Janaki tells him that her mother used to tell her that when she dies she will be reborn as Janaki's child. Janaki is then told by the college Principal to get rest and write her exams the following year. When Ramana's parents talk to Janaki's uncle, he blames Ramana.

Soon Ramana and Janaki move into a new house and Ramana is hired as a guitar player in a club. Janaki delivers a child in the hospital during Ramana's exams on which he can't concentrate and can't write anything. His lecturer tells him to study well as he has not done well in the previous tests also. But Janaki expects him to help her out in taking care of their baby. Ramana starts getting fed up of Janaki and the baby and starts refusing to change the baby's diaper and even to take care of the baby for a minute when Janaki is in the kitchen. During this time Ramana loses his job in the club and Janaki confronts him about his behaviour. Now angry, Ramana shouts and blames Janaki that she ruined his life, future and career. The next day when Ramana is writing his examination, Janaki brings the baby in a bassinet, approaches Ramana and leaves the baby in the exam hall and runs away to make Ramana understand the difficulty of raising a baby alone. The invigilator holds the crying baby until Ramana has finished his exam. Ramana returns home with the baby and regrets yelling at Janaki and takes care of the baby. One day when he is sleeping the baby disappears and Ramana goes searching for the child all over the city. He comes back home worried without finding the baby when Janaki returns home with the baby. Ramana apologises to her. Janaki tells him that she is pregnant again. In the end, the couple walks to college with the baby in the bassinet.

== Cast ==
- Uday Kiran as Ramana
- Reema Sen as Janaki
- Srinu as Ramana's friend
- Uttej as Milk man
- Tanikella Bharani as Ramana's father
- Delhi Rajeshwari as Ramana's mother
- Banerjee as Janaki's uncle
- Rallapalli as College lecturer
- AVS as Music Store owner
- Basha as Ramana's friend
- Babloo as Ramana's friend
- Gundu Sudarshan as Auto driver
- Amitov Teja in a cameo appearance in the song "Kukka Kavali"

== Soundtrack ==
The film's soundtrack was composed by R. P. Patnaik.

Chitram

Soundtrack album
- Released: 2000
- Genre: Feature film soundtrack
- Label: Mayuri Audio

All lyrics are written by Kulasekhar.

No.	Title	Singer(s)	Length
1.	"Anaganaga Chimalu Domalu"	R. P. Patnaik
2.	"Delhi Nunchi Galli Daaka"	Ravi Varma, Kousalya	6:12
3.	"Ekanthavela Ekantha Seva"	Mallikarjun, Kousalya	3:26
4.	"Kukka Kavali"	Nihal, R. P. Patnaik, Sandeep, Ravi Varma	4:47
5.	"Mavo Paripotunnadi"	R. P. Patnaik, Nihal, Ravi Varma, Kousalya	4:52
6.	"Uhala Pallaikilo"	Nihal, Usha	3:38

== Reception ==
A critic from Sify wrote that "Teja delivers a wholesome entertainer by narrating the theme in an entertaining way to attract all kinds of audience". Jeevi of Idlebrain.com rated the film four out of five. A critic from Full Hyderabad wrote that "A small film, Teja handles the treatment so well that there is no trace of confusion as to which way the movie should progress. And it is a remarkable achievement given the fact that it is his first film. It becomes all the more worthy since he handles an all new cast".

== Other version ==
The success of the film and Reema Sen's popularity in Tamil Nadu for her performance in her Tamil debut Minnale (2001) prompted the producers to dub and partially reshoot scenes in Tamil. Actors including Manivannan, Senthil, Charle, Manorama and Kalpana were signed on, while singers from Sun TV's Sapta Swarangal programme were used for the soundtrack.
