= Gunde Jhallumandi =

2008 Telugu film directed by Madan

- DVD cover
- Directed by: Madan
- Written by: Madan
- Produced by: Paruchuri Sivaram Prasad
- Starring: Uday Kiran; Aditi Sharma; Ahuti Prasad; Ajay
- Cinematography: J. Prabhakar Reddy
- Edited by: K. V. Krishna Reddy
- Music by: M. M. Keeravani
- Production company: United Movies
- Release date: 12 September 2008
- Running time: 150 minutes
- Language: Telugu

Gunde Jhallumandi (transl. Heart trembled) is 2008 Indian Telugu-language romantic drama film directed by Madan. It stars Uday Kiran and Aditi Sharma. The music is composed by M. M. Keeravani and the lyrics are penned by Siva Sakti Dutta and Chaitanya Prasad.

== Plot ==
The film begins with Neelima (Aditi Sharma), a student pursuing her bachelor's degree taking a strong decision to avoid boys who try to develop a relationship with her. She randomly selects a name, Rajesh and she announces the whole college that she is in love with Rajesh just to keep the boys at bay. She takes this decision because her elder sister, Bhramaraamba, was cheated by a person named Munna in the name of love and had to marry someone else at an early age and suffer because of that. So she does not want to become like her sister.

Balaraju (Uday Kiran) 'Balu' comes from a village to his sister's house in Hyderabad to study B.A, as it was a prerequisite for his village president post which he desperately wants to win because of his arch rival Ajay (Ajay) who had graduated earlier for the sake of the village president's post. Because of his spoilt nature the current president who believes in educated youth is the future, rejects his candidacy and declares Balaraju as his political heir but according to the village norms he needs to finish his graduation before applying for the candidacy. Though Balaraju quit studying years back, now he decides to finish his graduation in order to apply for the candidacy and comes to Hyderabad.

Balu is a shy person and is treated badly by the fellow students because he was a BA student which is considered inferior. He wants to go back to his village but he decides to fight back. He meets Neelima in the college. He changes his style and attitude with the help of Neelima and his six year old nephew.

Though she talks to him frequently Neelima is cautious not to get too close with him. Sometimes she uses the name Rajesh to avoid him. After knowing that Rajesh is a hoax, Balu also pretends with Neelima that he is in love with another fictitious lady called Lavanya. In the same college Balu bashes Raju, the leader of an eve teasing gang in the college. During the fight Balu's tattoo is exposed to Neelima. She remembers an incident during her earlier academic year while she was travelling in a bus with her grandmother, the angered Ajay is looking for Balu to bash him for standing against him for the president post, who is going to Hyderabad. While searching in the bus he lusts for Neelima and abducts her then Balu who covered his face because of the rainy weather comes to her rescue and bashes him. Later Neelima missed to thank him however she reached her home safely. During that day onwards she started liking him. After knowing that Lavanya is also fake they start dating by covering up their stories as a break up.

Suddenly a person by name Rajesh appears before Neelima and starts gaining sympathy from her friends that Balu pressured Neelima to break up with him to start a new relationship with her. Neelima is surprised to see Rajesh whose name she just used to escape from boys who tries to befriend her.

Then it is revealed that Neelima remembers that person is Rajesh who is an IT professional was stalking her from the day one when Neelima had faked Rajesh. After knowing her plans, he used this as an opportunity to harass her to start a relationship with him by making the stories true. But she avoids him and their last encounter she made him arrested for the harassment in public place. Humiliated by his peers Balu sees Rajesh and believes the Neelima's story was true and starts distancing himself from her

Then Neelima realised her mistake that living with lies is a sin and decides to face Rajesh to find out the solution. Their college peers who are the members of lovers' association who were sympathetic to Rajesh try to arrange a patch up meet with them and they order Balu to support their love by uniting them. Balu is heartbroken to hear this but decides to help her for arranging a meeting with Rajesh.

At the Golconda Fort, Neelima meets Rajesh, she is shocked to see Ajay and Raju who turns out to be his younger brother along with Rajesh. Then Ajay reveals it was a trap by him to bash Balu mentally and physically for standing against him in his village presidency and bashing his brother. After knowing that Balu has joined the same college where his brother was studying he came to the college to warn him but he observes the relationship between Neelima and Balu later when Neelima arrested Rajesh, Ajay comes to his rescue then he joined hands with him to get Neelima at any cost and decided to humiliate Balu.

Then the evil trio try to molest Neelima on thinking to make a concubine of them to humiliate Balu more. Meanwhile Balu is struggling with his self which says the entire circumstance was a lie. Then suddenly he hears all the conversations through the Fateh Darwaza and realised his instincts was right and hurriedly comes in rescue of her. Then Balu fights the trio and proposes her.

Finally the film ends with Balu and Neelima exposing the plans of Rajesh and they unite.

== Cast ==
- Uday Kiran as Balaraju 'Balu'
- Aditi Sharma as Neelima 'Neelu'
- Krishna as RamaKrishna, Balaraju's father
- Sana as Latha, Balaraju's mother
- Ahuti Prasad as Raghavendra, Neelima's father
- Madhumani as Neelima's mother
- Ajay as Ajay
- Dharmavarapu Subramanyam as English lecturer
- Venu Madhav as Rajesh, software engineer
- Surekha Vani as Balaraju's sister
- Jaya Prakash Reddy as Jayaprakash
- Srinivasa Reddy as Balaraju's friend

== Production ==
The climax of the film was shot in the historic Golconda Fort for 15 days. One of the song is shot in Chennakesava Temple at Belur.

== Music ==
M. M. Keeravani composed the music for this film. This album contains 8 songs. Chaitanya Prasad, who worked with Madan for his previous film Pellaina Kothalo penned the lyrics for all the songs except for one. The folk song "Pavada Kastha" was written by Siva Sakti Dutta, father of M. M. Keeravani.

No.	Song title	Singer(s)	Lyricist
1	"I Have a Boy Friend"	Nikitha Nigam	Chaitanya Prasad
2	"Gunde Jhallumandi"	Deepu, Ganga, Malavika, Chandra Teja	Chaitanya Prasad
3	"True Love"	M. M. Keeravani, Usha, Bhargavi Pillai	Chaitanya Prasad
4	"Pavada Kastha"	Jai Srinivas, Geetha Madhuri	Siva Sakti Dutta
5	"Idhi Adhe"	Krishna Chaitanya, Geetha Madhuri	Chaitanya Prasad
6	"Telusa Manasa"	Krishna Chaitanya, Geetha Madhuri	Chaitanya Prasad
7	"Nee Nuduti"	Geetha Madhuri	Siva Sakti Dutta
8	"Ila Endukoutondi"	M. M. Keeravani, Geetha Madhuri	Chaitanya Prasad

== Reception ==
A critic from Rediff.com wrote that "In a nutshell, Gunde Jhallumandi is a decent entertainer by Madan".
