= Tammareddy =

Tammareddy is a Telugu surname. Notable people with the surname include:

- Tammareddy Krishna Murthy (1920–2013), Telugu film producer
- Tammareddy Bharadwaja (born 1948), Indian film producer and director
- Tammareddy Chalapathi Rao, Telugu character actor
