= Venky =

2004 Telugu film directed by Srinu Vaitla

- Theatrical release poster
- Directed by: Srinu Vaitla
- Written by: Srinu Vaitla; Kona Venkat (dialogue)
- Produced by: Atluri Purnachandra Rao
- Starring: Ravi Teja; Sneha; Ashutosh Rana
- Cinematography: Prasad Murella
- Edited by: Marthand K. Venkatesh
- Music by: Devi Sri Prasad
- Production company: Lakshmi Productions
- Distributed by: Lakshmi Productions
- Release date: 26 March 2004
- Running time: 170 minutes
- Country: India
- Language: Telugu
- Box office: ₹11 crore distributors' share

Venky is a 2004 Indian Telugu-language action comedy thriller film directed by Srinu Vaitla and produced by Atluri Purnachandra Rao. The script was written by Srinu Vaitla, Kona Venkat, and Gopimohan. It stars Ravi Teja, Sneha, and Ashutosh Rana. The film features an ensemble supporting cast including Srinivasa Reddy, Chitram Srinu, Brahmanandam, AVS, Venu Madhav, Dharmavarapu Subramanyam, Krishna Bhagavan, and Master Bharath. The music was composed by Devi Sri Prasad.

Marking Srinu Vaitla's first collaboration with writers Kona Venkat and Gopimohan, the film follows a carefree youth and his friends who join police training, only to become entangled in a dangerous conspiracy that forces them to fight for their innocence. Released on 26 March 2004, the film was a commercial success collecting a distributor's share of ₹11 crore at the box office. Its comedy scenes have since gained a cult following and are often referenced in Telugu internet culture and meme pages.

== Plot ==
Venkateswara Rao "Venky" is a wayward youth from Vizag. After several unsuccessful attempts of finding employment, Venky and his friends Suri, Ramana and Bujji, luckily clear a police recruitment test, and they are selected for SI training. They travel to Hyderabad on Godavari Express train to attend the training. Venky meets Sravani on the train and instantly falls for her. He proposes the same to her, but she harshly rejects the proposal. Furious Venky threatens to murder Sravani's father Prasad Rao and a lady co-passenger, in a state of inebriation. To their astonishment, both of them are found dead the next morning.

Venky and his friends quickly escape from there. On a belief that the police academy is the only safe haven for them, they join the training immediately. The academy chief Yogendra Kumar Sharma is a very strict officer and a close friend of ACP Bharath, who is assigned to investigate the train murders case. In order to escape the scrutiny, they enter Sharma's office at night to tamper with the date of their arrival, but they find that Sharma himself is responsible for the murders. They learn that Sharma is after Prasad Rao's camera and Sravani would also be killed. Venky saves Sravani and keeps her in an old building behind their academy.

Later, they overhear that Bharat has found Venky's camera as evidence and its reel is given for development. They head to the studio beforehand and retrieve those photos. Upon looking at them, Venky finds out that Gajala, who introduced himself as a software engineer is actually a thief. They track him down and enquire about Prasad Rao's camera, but he lies that he had already sold it. Sharma soon finds out that Venky and his friends are after him, where he publicizes their names in the media and pressurizes their parents so that they would turn themselves in. He also finds out about Sravani's hideout and attacks her but she escapes.

Venky and Sharma make a deal to hand over Prasad Rao's camera which he doesn't honour. Gajala sees an opportunity and calls Sharma to make a deal in exchange for the camera, but Venky takes away the camera from him. With the camera, they learn that Prasad Rao recorded Sharma murdering a senior officer Sarath Kumar IPS as he wanted to escape from a fake stamp case. Prasad Rao unknowingly calls Sharma to report the murder unaware that Sharma himself is the real murderer. He comes to their home to take the camera but Sravani and her father escape to their village on seeing him in their apartment building.

Unaware that Sharma is the real murderer, Prasad Rao gives away their berth numbers and Sharma sends his hitman to kill them. The hitman murders him and a lady who slept on Sravani's berth. Sharma's henchmen attack them for the camera but Venky fights them off. Sravani seeks the Governor's appointment to directly submit the camera as evidence. Sharma tries to shoot Sravani but actually shoots the governor, getting himself arrested. Venky and his friends are honored & awarded medals by the DGP (Suman) in appreciation of their bravery.

== Cast ==
- Ravi Teja as Venkateswara Rao “Venky”
- Sneha as Sravani
- Ashutosh Rana as Yogendra Sharma IPS
- Srinivasa Reddy as Suri Babu
- Chitram Srinu as Ramana
- Ramachandra as Veerabhadram “Bujji”
- Brahmanandam as G.K. Gajala
- Dharmavarapu Subramanyam as Biksham
- AVS as Bokka Subbarao
- Venu Madhav as Nippu Nagaraju, ticket collector
- Mallikarjuna Rao as Jagadamba Chowdary "J.C."
- Tanikella Bharani as Venky's father
- Bharath Raju as ACP Bharat
- Delhi Rajeswari as Venky's mother
- C. V. L. Narasimha Rao as Prasad Rao, Sravani's father
- Krishna Bhagavan as Bhagavan, fake employer
- Master Bharath as Train Passenger
- Jeeva as Jeevaji
- Bharath Teja as ACP Bharath
- Ahuti Prasad as Sarat Kumar IPS
- Rasool as The Killer in Train
- S. S. Kanchi as Train Passenger
- Apoorva as Train passenger
- Kaushal Manda

Cameo appearances

- Suman in Special Appearance as DGP Chandrashekhar
- Raasi in special appearance in a song

== Soundtrack ==
Venky

Soundtrack album to Venky by Devi Sri Prasad
- Released: 17 February 2004
- Recorded: 2004
- Genre: Soundtrack
- Length: 28:50
- Language: Telugu
- Label: Aditya Music
- Producer: Devi Sri Prasad

Devi Sri Prasad chronology
Varsham (2003)	Venky (2004)	Abhi (2004)

The music and background score was composed by Devi Sri Prasad.

All lyrics are written by Sahiti.

No.	Title	Singer(s)	Length
1.	"Maar Maar"	Manikka Vinayagam, Srilekha Parthasarathy	05:14
2.	"Gongoora Thotakada"	Pushpavanam Kuppusamy, Kalpana	04:51
3.	"Silakemo"	Palakkad Sreeram, Malathy Lakshman	04:43
4.	"O Manasa"	Venu, Sumangali	04:15
5.	"Anaganaga Kathala"	Karthik, Sumangali	05:05
6.	"I Love You O Sravani"	Mallikarjun, Kalpana	04:42
Total length:			28:50

== Reception ==
A review from Sify opined that Venky was a mishmash of three films, the Malayalam film No.20 Madras Mail and the American films Training Day and Police Academy. They added that the film failed to impress as it missed a "natural flow of one leading to another." Idlebrain.com rated the film 3/5 appreciated the film for its humour but wrote the film falls flat as the suspense is revealed.

== Remake ==
Kick 2 remake of Venky development cast Randeep Hooda in a comic role Salman Khan producer Jyoti Deshpande, Sajid Nadiadwala & director Sajid Nadiadwala production houses Jio Studios, Nadiadwala Grandson Entertainment filming expected shooting to December 2026 shooting locations Mumbai.
