= Dhairyam (2005 film) =

2005 Telugu film by Teja

- DVD cover
- Directed by: Teja
- Screenplay by: Teja
- Based on: Sullan (Tamil)
- Produced by: N. Sudhakar Reddy; Narayan Das K. Narang
- Starring: Nithiin; Raima Sen
- Cinematography: Sameer Reddy
- Edited by: Shankar
- Music by: Anup Rubens
- Production company: Asian Entertainments
- Distributed by: Asian Cinemas
- Release date: 12 February 2005
- Running time: 175 minutes
- Country: India
- Language: Telugu

Dhairyam (transl. Guts) is a 2005 Indian Telugu-language romantic action drama film directed by Teja. It stars Nithiin and Raima Sen in the lead roles. The film released on 12 February 2005.

== Plot ==
Seenu is the son of Bonala Bikshapati, a corporation garbage lorry driver. A college student, his only objective in life is to have fun with his friends. He falls in love with Mallika, the daughter of millionaire Somalinga Raju. An enraged Raju conspired to have Seenu sent to jail. How Seenu and Mallika reunite forms the rest of the story.

== Cast ==
- Nithiin as Seenu
- Raima Sen as Mallika
- Tanikella Bharani as Bonala Bikshapati, Seenu's father
- Rahman as Somalinga Raju, Mallika's father
- Aishwarya as Mallika's mother
- Rajyalakshmi as Seenu's mother
- Chalapathi Rao as Mallika's grandfather
- Suman Shetty as Seenu's friend
- C. Arunpandian as Police Inspector
- Mallikarjuna Rao as Police Officer
- Rallapalli as Swamiji
- Brahmanandam as Priest
- Ali as Makarana
- L. B. Sriram as Wedding guest
- Kota Srinivasa Rao as Makarana's father
- Sri Lakshmi as Makarana's mother
- Gundu Hanumantha Rao as Priest's assistant
- Venu Yeldandi as Prakash, Seenu's friend
- Babloo as Seenu's friend
- Duvvasi Mohan as Prisoner

== Production ==
It was reported in 2002 that Teja would produce and direct a film called Dhairyam with Nithin. The film was launched on 22 February 2004 on the day of Teja's birthday at Annapurna Studios. The film was reported to be a remake of the Tamil-language film Sullan (2004).

== Soundtrack ==
The music was composed by Anup Rubens and released by Aditya Music.

Dhairyam

Soundtrack album by Anup Rubens
- Released: 2005
- Recorded: 2005
- Genre: Soundtrack
- Length: 29:49
- Label: Aditya Music
- Producer: Anup Rubens

Anup Rubens chronology
Jai (2004)	Dhairyam (2005)	Gowtam SSC (2005)

Track list
No.	Title	Lyrics	Singer(s)	Length
1.	"Neetho Cheppana"	Kulasekhar	S. P. B. Charan, Shravani	4:15
2.	"Naa Pranam"	Kulasekhar	KK, Pooja, Shravani, Lavanya, Srinu, Pramod, Balaji	3:36
3.	"Neelo Nalo Prema"	Kulasekhar	R. P. Patnaik, Sunitha Upadrashta	1:58
4.	"Nuvvena Nuvvena"	Kulasekhar	Saandip, Shravani, Lavanya	3:07
5.	"Chacha Chichi"	Kulasekhar	Shankar Mahadevan, Malgadi Subha	4:14
6.	"Hoirama Hoirama"	Kulasekhar	Sukhwinder Singh, Pooja, Viswa	4:04
7.	"Yamito Elaga Telupanu"	Kulasekhar	Usha	4:04
8.	"Bipc Badhmash Pori"	Mittapalli Surendhar	Ravi Varma	4:31
Total length:				29:49

== Reception ==
A critic from Rediff.com wrote that Teja "rehashes his old hit Nuvvu Nenu for the entertaining first half (principal-lecturer duo, students' pranks and poor and rich conflict) but his 'dramatic' second part drags on and on, testing the audience's patience". Jeevi of Idlebrain.com wrote that "This film is a disappointment from Teja".
