= Nijam =

- Movie Poster
- Directed by: Teja
- Written by: Teja
- Produced by: Teja
- Starring: Mahesh Babu; Gopichand; Rakshita; Raasi
- Cinematography: Sameer Reddy
- Edited by: Shankar
- Music by: R. P. Patnaik
- Production company: Chitram Movies
- Release date: 23 May 2003
- Running time: 187 minutes
- Country: India
- Language: Telugu

Nijam (transl. Truth) is a 2003 Indian Telugu-language action film written, directed and produced by Teja under the Chitram Movies banner. The film stars Mahesh Babu, Gopichand, Rakshita, and Raasi, with music was composed by R. P. Patnaik.

Nijam was released on 23 May 2003. It opened to mixed reviews and became a box office failure. Babu and Rameshwari won the Nandi Awards in Best Actor and Best Supporting Actress categories respectively. It was remade in Odia as Arjun (2005) starring Anubhav Mohanty and in Bangladesh as Top Leader (2005) starring Shakib Khan.

== Plot ==
Sidda Reddy is a powerful gangster. His right-hand man Devadaya "Devudu" Sharma has a lover named Malli. Reddy, who also likes Malli, takes her to bed, which enrages Devudu. Eventually, Devudu kills Reddy and takes over the gang. Venkateswarlu is a fire officer who slaps Devudu when the latter sets a marketplace on fire. Devudu holds a grudge against Venkateswarlu, and he sends him to prison on a framed charge of the murder of Malli's brother Baddu. Venkateswarlu's son G. Seetharam tries to rescue his father, but everybody starts asking him for a bribe to do the work. At the end of the day, CI Mohan and Devudu kill Venkateswarlu bloody. Enraged, Seetaram and his mother Shanthi plan to execute the people involved in Venkateswarlu's death and also finish Devudu, thus exacting their vengeance. ACP Raja Narendra is appointed to investigate the murders.

== Cast ==
- Mahesh Babu as G. Sitaram
- Gopichand as Devadaya "Devudu" Sarma
- Rakshita as Janaki
- Raasi as Malli
- Prakash Raj as ACP Raja Narendra
- Jaya Prakash Reddy as Sidda Reddy
- Brahmanandam as Rama Chandra Murthy
- Ranganath as G. Venkateswarlu, Sitaram's father
- Rameswari as Santhi, Sitaram's mother
- Brahmaji as CI D. Mohan
- Vijayachander as DGP
- Jeeva as DCP Murali Krishna
- Suman Setty as Baddu, Malli's brother
- Kanta Rao as Narayana Rao, social worker
- Rallapalli as butcher
- Kondavalasa as Sitaram's neighbor
- Duvvasi Mohan as constable Narsing Rao
- Dharmavarapu Subrahmanyam as traffic constable
- Tirupathi Prakash as Sitaram's neighbor
- Shakeela as Sitaram's neighbor
- Alapati Lakshmi
- Master Ghatamaneni Jaya Krishna
- Mani Chandana as a dancer (cameo appearance in the song "Rathalu Rathalu")

== Soundtrack ==
Nijam

Soundtrack album by R. P. Patnaik
- Released: 16 March 2003
- Recorded: 2003
- Genre: Soundtrack
- Length: 33:54
- Label: Aditya Music
- Producer: R. P. Patnaik

R. P. Patnaik chronology
Dil (2003)	Nijam (2003)	Sambaram (2003)

Music was composed by R. P. Patnaik. Lyrics were penned by Kulasekhar. Music was released on Aditya Music.

No.	Title	Singer(s)	Length
1.	"Chandamama Raave"	R. P. Patnaik, Usha	3:39
2.	"Rathalu Rathalu"	R. P. Patnaik, Usha	4:15
3.	"Neelo Unnadi"	R. P. Patnaik, Usha	4:01
4.	"Chi Chi Ante"	R. P. Patnaik, Usha	4:13
5.	"Dhandakam"	Gopichand, Gangadhara Sastry	1:53
6.	"Ilage Ilage"	R. P. Patnaik, Usha	3:54
7.	"Kakulu Durani"	R. P. Patnaik, Ravi Varma	1:48
8.	"Abhimanyudu"	Group Song	1:52
9.	"Chara Chara"	Usha, Murthy	4:04
10.	"Rangu Rangula"	R. P. Patnaik	4:08
Total length:			33:54

== Release ==
=== Reception ===
Jeevi of Idlebrain gave 3 out of 5 stars and wrote "Overall, it's an average film that has chances to become hit because of the Teja's mass-attracting episodes and Mahesh Babu's brilliant portrayal of the character". Vijayalakshmi of Rediff wrote "Only a couple of things salvage director Teja's Nijam -- the first is an excellent performance by lead star and teen sensation Mahesh. The second is cinematographer Samir Reddy's camera work. BVS Prakash of Screen wrote "Except for some good performance by Mahesh, director Teja’s much-hyped film Nijam (truth) is nothing but a rehash of Kamal Haasan’s Indian and it also lacks realistic characters with villain (Gopi) who calls himself God but behaves like a psychic. Teja, who rose to fame with love stories Nuvvu Nenu and Jayam, fails to dish out an interesting ‘star-centric’ film".

=== Box office ===
In an interview, Teja said "We made Nijam in a budget of ₹6.5 crore; We sold audio rights for ₹2 crore and movie initially were sold for a total of ₹26 crore. In total, we made a profit of ₹5-6 crore and Nijam was not a flop". In an interview with The Hindu, Teja told "I worked with Mahesh after he had a flop called Bobby, but Nijam released after Okkadu and people drew comparisons. I don’t argue when people say Nijam was a flop. The film was made with a budget of ₹6.5 crore and sold for ₹21 crore. I repaid money to whoever lost money and still made a huge profit".

== Dubbed versions and remakes ==
The film was also dubbed into Tamil as the same title, and then again in 2012 as Nisam. The film was dubbed as Meri Adalat in Hindi, in Bengali as Aamar Protishodh and in Bhojpuri as Hamaar Faisla. It was remade as Arjun (2005) in Odia starring Anubhab Mohanty and Gargi Mohanty with Rameswari reprised her role from the original Telugu film. and Bangladesh as Top Leader (2005) starring Shakib Khan.

== Awards ==
=== Won ===
Nandi Awards

- Best Actor - Mahesh Babu
- Best Supporting Actress - Talluri Rameswari

CineMAA Awards

- Best Villain - Gopichand

=== Nominated ===
Filmfare Awards South

- Best Actor - Telugu - Mahesh Babu
- Filmfare Award for Best Supporting Actress - Telugu - Taluri Rameswari

CineMAA Awards

- CineMAA Award for Best Actor - Male - Mahesh Babu
- CineMAA Award for Best Film - Teja
