= Andamaina Manasulo =

Indian Telugu-language film

- DVD cover
- Directed by: R. P. Patnaik
- Written by: Kulasekhar (dialogues)
- Screenplay by: R. P. Patnaik
- Story by: R. P. Patnaik
- Produced by: S. V. Babu
- Starring: Rajiv; Remya Nambeesan; Archanna Guptaa
- Cinematography: Santosh Rai Pathaje
- Edited by: K. V. Krishna Reddy
- Music by: R. P. Patnaik
- Production company: SV Productions
- Release date: 14 February 2008
- Country: India
- Language: Telugu

Andamaina Manasulo (transl. In a beautiful mind) is a 2008 Indian Telugu-language romantic drama film directed by R. P. Patnaik and starring Rajiv, Remya Nambeesan, and Archanna Guptaa.

The title of the film is based on a song of the same name from Jayam (2002).

== Cast ==
- Rajiv as Tushar
- Remya as Sandhya
- Archana Gupta as Bindu
- Vadde Naveen as Sandhya's husband
- Sunil as Tushar's friend
- Gollapudi Maruti Rao as Tushar's professor
- Benarjee as Bindu's father
- Sana as Bindu's mother
- R. Narayana Murthy (special appearance)
- R. P. Patnaik (special appearance)

== Production ==
Music composer R. P. Patnaik made his directorial debut with this film. He initially was to direct a film titled Avunantu Kadantu but the film did not enter frutition. Sindhu Menon was to be in the film but eventually did not feature. Newcomers Rajiv and Archanna Guptaa made their debut with this film. Remya Nambeesan made her Telugu debut with this film.

== Soundtrack ==
The soundtrack was composed by R. P. Patnaik.

Andamaina Manasulo

Soundtrack album by R. P. Patnaik
- Released: 2008
- Genre: Feature film soundtrack
- Length: 28:23
- Language: Telugu
- Label: Vel Records

R. P. Patnaik chronology
Swagatam (2008)	Andamaina Manasulo (2008)	Broker (2010)
External audio
- Andamaina Manasulo – Jukebox on YouTube

All lyrics are written by Kulasekhar.

Track listing
No.	Title	Singer(s)	Length
1.	"Ammayi Navvindi"	Raj, Koti, Devi Sri Prasad, M. M. Keeravani, R. P. Patnaik, Vandemataram Srinivas, Chakri, Sri, Ramana Gogula	3:38
2.	"Andala Chandamama"	R. P. Patnaik, Sravana Bhargavi	5:53
3.	"Anu Yuddham"	Chinmayi Sripaada, Pranavi Acharya	4:48
4.	"Paapakemo Muddhe Vaddu"	Jassie Gift	4:16
5.	"Nuvve Nuvve"	Mamta Mohandas, Ravi Varma	4:04
6.	"Ready Ready Ready"	R. P. Patnaik	3:41
7.	"AndhalaChandama (Bit)"	Harish Raghavendra	2:03
Total length:			28:23

== Reception ==
A critic from Bangalore Mirror opined that "Unfortunately, the movie looks like a documentary. It lacks a tight script and fails to hold your attention for most of the second half".

== Awards ==
Nandi Awards of 2008

- Best Story Writer - R. P. Patnaik
