= Holi (2002 film) =

2002 Telugu film

- Poster
- Directed by: SVN Vara Prasad
- Written by: SVN Vara Prasad
- Produced by: N Surya Prakasa Rao
- Starring: Uday Kiran; Richa Pallod
- Cinematography: Sarath; Sameer Reddy
- Edited by: Shankar
- Music by: R. P. Patnaik
- Production company: SP Creations
- Release date: 30 August 2002
- Running time: 133 minutes
- Country: India
- Language: Telugu

Holi is a 2002 Indian Telugu-language romantic drama film written and directed by SVN Vara Prasad. It stars Uday Kiran and Richa Pallod in the lead roles.

== Plot ==
Kiran works at a software firm and lives with his supportive family, including his parents, brother, and sister-in-law, who strongly believe in the idea of love marriage. Inspired by their experiences, Kiran begins to see love marriage as an ideal. Meanwhile, Sandhya, whose full name is Akhilandeswari Sandhya Kumari, joins the same software firm. Kiran quickly falls in love with her and confides in his family, who enthusiastically support his feelings. Encouraged by their advice, he expresses his love to Sandhya during a Holi celebration in her village, Madanapalle. However, Sandhya, who does not believe in love before marriage, rejects his proposal, leading to a rift between them.

As the story unfolds, Sandhya gradually develops feelings for Kiran. Complications arise when her marriage is arranged with someone else. The rest of the narrative follows Kiran's efforts to win her love and overcome the challenges posed by the impending marriage, ultimately leading to their union.

== Cast ==
- Uday Kiran as Kiran
- Richa Pallod as Sandhya / "Chinni"
- Brahmanandam as Ramakrishna
- Sunil as Raja
- L. B. Sriram as Sriram
- Banerjee chalapathi rao's friend
- Sudha as Lakshmi, sandhya's mother
- Chalapati Rao as Krishnam Raju, Sandhya's father
- Jaya Prakash Reddy as JP a.k.a. Jayaprakash, Vasanthi's father
- Giri Babu as Rama Chandra Murthy
- Chandra Mohan as Rama Chandrayya, Kiran's father
- Rajashree as Vasanthi, Kiran’s sister-in-law
- Sri Lakshmi
- Swetha
- Sumeet
- Kavithaas kiran's mother
- Raghu Kunche as Sekhar
- Rashmi Gautam as Shalu
- Mink Brar in the item number "Chamak Cham"

== Soundtrack ==
In an audio review, Sreya Sunil wrote that "RP Patnaik comes out with some impressive, some average to above average songs".

All lyrics are written by Kulasekhar; all music is composed by R. P. Patnaik

No.	Title	Singer(s)	Length
1.	"Ounani"	R. P. Patnaik
2.	"Priyathama"	S. P. Balasubrahmanyam, K. S. Chithra
3.	"Aadapillalu"	KK, Kavita Krishnamurthy
4.	"O Cheliya"	KK, Sadhana Sargam
5.	"Nee Manasu"	R. P. Patnaik, Sadhana Sargam
6.	"Chamaku Chamak"	Suneeta Rao
7.	"Life is Beautiful"	Uday Kiran, Anoop
8.	"Chinthamani"	R. P. Patnaik, Sunil

== Reception ==
The film was released to mixed reviews although the songs were praised. Jeevi of Idlebrain.com gave the film three and a half of five stars and praised the performances of the new age concept, lead actors, the songs, and the cinematography. Gudipoodi Srihari of The Hindu wrote, "This is another love story, but for a change deals with responsible love and happy ending". A critic for Telugucinema.com called Holi "an average-to-hit scale movie with so-so comedy and okay songs, mixed with neat cinematography in scenic locations. The movie can be a hit, or a good hit, because of the fact that the movie is a bit different from other movies of the same 'youthful love stories' genre".
