= Sambaram =

- DVD cover
- Directed by: Dasaradh
- Written by: Dasaradh
- Produced by: Teja
- Starring: Nithiin; Nikitha
- Cinematography: Prasad
- Edited by: K. V. Krishna Reddy
- Music by: R. P. Patnaik
- Production company: Chitram Movies
- Release date: 31 July 2003
- Running time: 129 mins.
- Country: India
- Language: Telugu

Sambaram (English Translation: Celebration) is a 2003 Indian Telugu-language drama film starring Nithiin and Nikitha in lead roles and directed by Dasaradh.

== Plot ==
Ravi (Nithiin) and Geeta (Nikitha) are childhood friends. Ravi is a carefree guy who roams around with friends without concentrating on studies. Geeta is a sincere student who passes engineering studies. Ravi has feelings for her and everybody in the town is aware of it except for Geeta. When she is asked by Nitin's sister-in-law Seeta when she is planning to marry Ravi, she expresses her surprise and says that they are just friends and she has no feelings for him. She shows her materialistic attitude by saying that she wants her husband to be financially and academically stronger than her. Ravi is devastated after listening to her logic. He realizes the importance of being a responsible family member and work as a mechanic to earn money. He becomes proficient in his work and finally gets the visa to work in Dubai. He wants to leave for Dubai as it gives him an opportunity to prove his money-earning ability despite being away from Geeta. Meanwhile, Geeta's father dies and she starts realizing that it takes more than academics and finances to make a man qualified to be a husband. And by that time Ravi is already at the airport. When Geeta learns about Ravi going to Dubai for a job, she realizes her love for him and rushes to the airport to stop him. Finally, Geeta proposes to Ravi and they happily get married.

== Cast ==
- Nithiin as Ravi (Voice-over by Sivaji)
- Nikitha as Geeta (Voice-over by Sunitha)
- Seeta as Satya, Ravi's sister-in-law
- S. V. Krishna Reddy as Lecturer
- Paruchuri Venkateswara Rao as Venkatachalam, Ravi's father
- Giri Babu as Geeta's father, Rama Chandra Murthy
- Sana as Parvathi, Geeta's mother
- Sudha as Rajyalakshmi, Ravi's mother
- Banerjee as Banerjee, Ravi's brother
- Duvvasi Mohan as Duvvasi
- M. S. Narayana as Narayana
- Satyam Rajesh as Rajesh, Ravi's foster friend
- Suman Shetty as Suman
- Rallapalli as Anjibabu, Ravi's friend-in-law
- Kondavalasa Lakshmana Rao as Krishna Rao
- Venu Madhav as Venu, Ravi's friend-in-law
- Nikhil Siddharth as Car driver (uncredited)

== Soundtrack ==
The music was composed by R. P. Patnaik.

Sambaram

Soundtrack album by R. P. Patnaik
- Released: 2003
- Recorded: 2003
- Genre: Soundtrack
- Length: 34:16
- Label: Aditya Music
- Producer: R. P. Patnaik

R. P. Patnaik chronology
Dil (2003)	Sambaram (2003)	Nijam (2003)

Track list
No.	Title	Lyrics	Singer(s)	Length
1.	"Devudichina"	Kulasekhar	Tippu	4:15
2.	"Endhukuley Ila"	Sirivennela Seetharama Sastry	R. P. Patnaik	3:54
3.	"Erra Gulabhi"	Kulasekhar	Ravi Varma, Malli	4:10
4.	"Madhuram Madhuram"	Kulasekhar	Rajesh Krishnan	2:47
5.	"Nakka Thoka"	Kulasekhar	Ravi Varma, Sriram, Balaji	3:53
6.	"Nee Sneham"	Kulasekhar	R. P. Patnaik	1:51
7.	"Pattudhalatho"	Sirivennela Seetharama Sastry	Mallikarjun	3:39
8.	"Pitta Nadum"	Kulasekhar	R. P. Patnaik, Usha	4:12
9.	"Premanu Premincha"	Kulasekhar	R. P. Patnaik	4:25
10.	"Sambaram Theme"		Instrumental	1:10
Total length:				34:16

== Reception ==
The Hindu opined that the director "fails to deliver a happy, engrossing subject".
