= Dil (2003 film) =

Dil.
- Film poster
- Directed by: V. V. Vinayak
- Screenplay by: V. V. Vinayak
- Dialogues by: Chintapalli Ramana
- Story by: V. V. Vinayak
- Produced by: Raju; Giri
- Starring: Nithiin; Neha; Prakash Raj
- Cinematography: Vijay C. Kumar
- Edited by: Gautham Raju
- Music by: R. P. Patnaik
- Production company: Sri Venkateswara Creations
- Distributed by: Sri Venkateswara Creations
- Release date: 4 April 2003
- Country: India
- Language: Telugu

Dil (transl. Heart) is a 2003 Indian Telugu-language romantic action comedy film directed by V. V. Vinayak and produced by debutant Raju. The film stars Nithiin, Neha, and Prakash Raj. The film is commercially blockbuster at the box office. The success of the film led to the producer Raju becoming known as Dil Raju henceforth.

The film is remade in Tamil as Kuthu (2004), in Kannada as Student (2006), in Oriya as Premi No.1 (2009), in Indian Bengali as Challenge (2009), and in Bangladeshi Bengali as Bhalobasha Zindabad (2013).

== Plot ==
Seenu is a new admit at Maharaja College of Arts and Sciences. Nandini goes to the same college. Seenu is from a middle-class family, while Nandini is the only daughter of Gowri Shankar, a land mafia don. Gowri's assistant suspects them to be lovers after he finds them dancing at the fresher's celebration at college. The assistant tries to warn Seenu to stay away from her, but is beaten up by the latter. After a few attempts, she falls in love with him. Gowri and the assistant learn of their relationship and threaten Seenu's parents. Seenu's mother tells him to stop loving Nandini and warns him to stay away from her, while his father does the opposite. Seenu beats Gowri's henchmen as an act of retaliation. He even goes to Gowri's house, warns him, tells him that he would marry Nandini because he loves her, and he'll bless them both. Due to a trick by Gowri, Seenu gets beaten up badly. Irritated by this, Seenu is determined to win Nandini's love. They elope and get married when Gowri tries to separate them. The story takes a few turns before it ends on a happy note.

== Cast ==
- Nithiin as Srinivas "Srinu" (Voice dubbed by Sivaji)
- Neha as Nandini (Voice dubbed by Sunitha)
- Prakash Raj as Gowri Shankar
- Chalapati Rao as Seenu's father
- Sudha as Seenu's mother
- Kalpana as Nandini's mother
- MS Narayana as Principal
- L. B. Sriram as Ramanatham
- Duvvasi Mohan as Villager
- Venu Madhav as Venu, Seenu's uncle
- Sangeetha as Nandini's grandmother
- Raghu Babu as Babji, Gowri's assistant
- Rajan P. Dev as Nandini's grandfather
- Rallapalli as Telephone Exchange Employee
- Ahuti Prasad as police officer
- Fish Venkat as Gowri's henchman
- Ananth as Professor
- Dil Ramesh as Gowri's assistant #2

== Production ==
This was the first film as the producer for "Dil" Raju. In fact, his name got prefixed with the title as it brought him recognition in the film industry. After this, he went on to register many hits, and the credit displayed on the screens of his movies is still Dil Raju. This was the debut for the heroine Neha.

== Soundtrack ==
The music was composed by R. P. Patnaik and released by Aditya Music. The platinum disc function was held on 30 March 2003 coinciding with Nithiin's birthday with V. V. Vinayak, M. S. Raju, K. Vijaya Bhaskar, Trivikram Srinivas and Dasardh attending the event as chief guests.

Dil

Soundtrack album by R. P. Patnaik
- Released: 2003
- Recorded: 2003
- Genre: Soundtrack
- Length: 28:49
- Label: Aditya Music
- Producer: R. P. Patnaik

R. P. Patnaik chronology
Nee Sneham (2002)	Dil (2003)	Sambaram (2003)

Track list
No.	Title	Lyrics	Singer(s)	Length
1.	"Peddaloddantunna"	Peddada Murthy	K. S. Chithra, Sri Ram	3:53
2.	"Enduko Emito"	Kulasekhar	R. P. Patnaik	4:09
3.	"Tamalapaku"	Suddala Ashok Teja	R. P. Patnaik, Usha	3:48
4.	"Amma Aavu"	Chandrabose	S. P. Balasubrahmanyam, Usha	4:42
5.	"CM PM"	Chandrabose	KK	4:44
6.	"Oka Nuvvu Oka Nenu"	Vinare Kumar	KK	3:12
7.	"Gajulu Gallumannaye"	T. Uma Maheswara Rao	R. P. Patnaik, Usha	4:21
Total length:				28:49

== Reception ==
Jeevi of Idlebrain.com wrote that "Over all, it's a good film to watch". Gudipoodi Srihari of The Hindu wrote, "The story in the first half of this film runs almost on the same lines of Run, another three-letter title. But Dil treads on its own path through scenes resolving the problem created in the subject".

== Dubbed versions and remakes ==
Dil was remade in Tamil as Kuthu (2004), in Kannada as Student (2006), in Oriya as Premi No.1 (2009), in Indian Bengali as Challenge (2009) and in Bangladeshi Bengali in 2013 as Bhalobasha Zindabad (2013).

The film was also dubbed in Hindi as Bichhoo: The Scorpion in 2010.
