= Usha (Telugu singer) =

Indian singer (born 1980)

- Also known as: usha munukutla
- Born: 29 May 1980 (age 46)
- Origin: Nagarjuna Sagar, Telangana, India
- Genres: playback singing
- Occupation: Singer
- Years active: 1999–present

Usha (born 29 May 1980) is an Indian singer who works predominantly in Telugu. She has sung in Kannada and Tamil also. In a career spanning about 10 years, she has established herself as one of the leading playback singers in the Telugu film industry and has worked with many major music directors.

== Career ==
=== Music competitions ===
Usha began her singing career with "Paadutha Teeyaga", a music based program on Eenadu Television hosted by singer S. P. Balasubrahmanyam. She stood first in the competition and later followed up by winning another music contest titled "Navaragam" on Gemini TV.

Usha participated in various music-related shows on TV between 1996 and 2000. Her performance in "Endaro Mahanubhavlu" on Gemini TV won her appreciation and applause from the audience. She later participated in "Meri Awaz Suno" on Star TV and was one of the finalists in the All-India finals. She also participated in various Hindi programs on channels like ELTV and Zee TV.

=== Movie career ===
Usha got her maiden opportunity from Sri. Vandemataram Srinivas, renowned music director. Her first song was from the movie Illalu. She got her major break in Telugu film industry in 2000. She sang in various Telugu movies like Indra, Chiruta, Athidhi, Pourudu, Varsham, Bhadra, Chitram, Nuvvu Nenu, Manasantha Nuvve, Nuvvu Leka Nenu Lenu, Jayam, Santhosham, Nee Sneham, Avunanna Kadanna and many more.

=== Concerts ===
Usha has performed in close to 150 concerts worldwide. Apart from her own solo concerts, she has performed alongside legendary singers and musicians like Sri. S. P. Balasubrahmanyam, Shankar Mahadevan, Hariharan, Mani Sharma, P. Susheela and Mano among many others. Her biggest achievement was performing with Sri. SP Balasubramanyam at the Afro-Asian Games opening ceremony in 2003 in Hyderabad.

=== TV programmes ===
- Sa Re Ga Ma Pa – Little Champs (Zee Telugu) – 2007
- Swaraneerajanam (Zee Telugu) – 2008
- Sa Re Ga Ma Pa – Nuvva Nena (Zee Telugu) – 2010
- Super Singer 7 (MAA TV ) – 2012
- Super Singer 10 (MAA TV) – 2019
- Super singer 2020 by vastavam

== Awards ==
=== Nandi Awards ===
- Best Female Playback Singer (TV Category) in 2006 for TV film song "Bommarillu Podarillu"
- Best Female Playback Singer in 2002 for "Chinuku Tadiki" song from Nee Sneham
- Best Female Playback Singer in 2001 for "Kallu Teravani" song from Padma

== Filmography ==
Usha has recorded with music directors, such as Ilaiyaraaja, M. M. Keeravani, Koti, Mani Sharma, Vandemataram Srinivas, Devi Sri Prasad, Kamalakar, RP Patnaik, Chakri, Yuvan Shankar Raja, Ramana Gogula and others.

- Shubhavela (2000)
- Chitram (2000)
- Bachi (2000)
- Vechi Vunta (2001)
- Takkari Donga (2001)
- Shivudu (2001)
- Premaku Swagatham (2001)
- Nuvvu Nenu (2001)
- Nuvvu Leka Nenu Lenu (2001)
- Ramma Chilakamma (2001)
- Manasantha Nuvve (2001)
- Bhadrachalam (2001)
- Ammo Bomma (2001)
- Vachinavaadu Suryudu (2002)
- Toli Parichayam (2002)
- Sreeram (2002)
- Santhosham (2002)
- Prudhvi Narayana (2002)
- Premante (2002)
- Pellam Oorelithe (2002)
- Nuvve Nenu Nene Nuvvu (2002)
- Ninne Cherukunta (2002)
- Nenu Ninnu Premistunnanu (2002)
- Neethodu Kaavali (2002)
- Nee Sneham (2002)
- Nee Premakai (2002)
- Memu (2002)
- Manasundi...Ra! (2002)
- Kubusam (2002)
- Jenda (2002)
- Jayam (2002)
- Indra (2002)
- Hai (2002)
- Girl Friend (2002)
- Gemeni (2002)
- Eeswar (2002)
- Dhanush (2002)
- Chance (2002)
- Anveshana (2002)
- Andam (2002)
- Ammulu (2002)
- Allari Ramudu (2002)
- Aahuti (2002)
- Sambhu (2003)
- Jodi No. 1 (2003)
- Nijam (2003)
- Neeku Nenu Naaku Nuvvu (2003)
- Chantigadu (2003)
- Missamma (2003)
- Maa Bapubommaku Pellanta (2003)
- Kalyanam (2003)
- Kaartik (2003)
- Johnny (2003)
- Janaki Weds Sriram (2003)
- Golmaal (2003)
- Fools (2003)
- Dil (2003)
- Appudappudu (2003)
- Aayudham (2003)
- Aadanthe Ado Type (2003)
- Varsham (2004)
- Thanks (2004)
- Tapana (2004)
- Swamy (2004)
- Seenu Vasanthi Lakshmi (2004)
- Sreenu C/O Anu (2004)
- Preminchukunnam Pelliki Randi (2004)
- Maa Ilavelpu (2004)
- Koduku (2004)
- Jai (2004)
- Avunu Nijame (2004)
- Apuroopam (2004)
- Aadi C/O ABN College (2004)
- Aa Naluguru (2004)
- Venkat Tho Alivelu (2005)
- Thakadimitha (2005)
- Shravana Masam (2005)
- Satti (2005)
- Sada Mee Sevalo (2005)
- Pourusham (2005)
- Pellam Pitchodu (2005)
- Moguds Pellams (2005)
- Meenakshi (2005)
- Manchukurise Velalo (2005)
- Guru (2005)
- Good Boy (2005)
- Friendship (2005)
- Evadi Gola Vaadidi (2005)
- Dhairyam (2005)
- Bhadra (2005)
- Ayodhya (2005)
- Avunanna Kaadanna (2005)
- Amma Meeda Ottu (2005)
- Naayudamma (2006)
- Pulakintha (2006)
- Missing (2007)
- Manchukurise Velalo (2007)
- Kalyanam (2007)
- Aa Roje (2007)
- Chiruta (2007)
- Bhayya (2007)
- Athidhi (2007)
- Ontari (2008)
- Bhadradri (2008)
- Pourudu (2008)
- Erra Samudram (2008)
- Pandurangadu (2008)
- Gunde Jhallumandi (2008)
- Sri Medaram Sammakka Sarakka Mahatyam (2008)
- Mr. Gireesam (2008)
- Junction (2008)
- Ee Vayasulo (2009)
- Manorama (2009)
- Rowdy (2014)
- Eduruleni Alexander (2014)
- Colors (2015)

== Telugu discography ==
Year	Film	Song	Composer(s)	Co-singer(s)
2002	Nuvvu Leka Nenu Lenu	"Edo Edo"	R. P. Patnaik	
2002	Nuvvu Leka Nenu Lenu	"Ela Ela"	R. P. Patnaik	
2002	Indra	"Ayyo Ayyo Ayyayyo"	R. P. Patnaik	Karthik
2002	Jayam	"Nesthama"	R. P. Patnaik	R. P. Patnaik
2002	Jayam	"Priyathama"	R. P. Patnaik	R. P. Patnaik
2002	Jayam	"Gorantha Prema"	R. P. Patnaik	R. P. Patnaik
2002	Jayam	"Evvaru Emanna"	R. P. Patnaik	R. P. Patnaik
2002	Jayam	"Raanu Raanu"	R. P. Patnaik	R. P. Patnaik
2002	Jayam	"Enduko"(Female)	R. P. Patnaik	
2002	Sreeram	"Bulli Bulli"	R. P. Patnaik	R. P. Patnaik
2002	Sreeram	"Chinna Chitunavvutoti"	R. P. Patnaik	S. P. Charan
2002	Santosham	"Nuvvante Nakisthamani"	R. P. Patnaik	Rajesh
2002	Santosham	"Devude Digivachina"	R. P. Patnaik	KK
2002	Santosham	"Diri Diri Diridi"	R. P. Patnaik	KK
2002	Santosham	"Ne Tholisariga"	R. P. Patnaik	
2002	Gemini	"Dil Diwana Main Hasina"	R. P. Patnaik	
2002	Gemini	"Nadaka Chuste Vayyaram"	R. P. Patnaik	Shankar Mahadevan
2002	Eeswar	"Olammo Olammo"	R. P. Patnaik	R. P. Patnaik
2002	Eeswar	"Gundelo Valava"	R. P. Patnaik	Rajesh
2002	Eeswar	"Dhindhirana"	R. P. Patnaik	Rajesh
2002	Eeswar	"Innallu"	R. P. Patnaik	Rajesh
2002	Eeswar	"Kotaloni Rani"	R. P. Patnaik	Rajesh, Kousalya
2002	Nee Sneham	"Yeppatiki"	R. P. Patnaik	R. P. Patnaik
2002	Nee Sneham	"Yemo Aunemo"	R. P. Patnaik	Rajesh
2002	Nee Sneham	"Ila Choodu"	R. P. Patnaik	Rajesh
2002	Nee Sneham	"Chinuku Thadiki"	R. P. Patnaik	
2002	Nee Sneham	"Yemo Aunemo"(Humming)	R. P. Patnaik	
