= Santosham (2002 film) =

2002 Indian film directed by Dasaradh

- 7th Week successful running release poster
- Directed by: Dasaradh
- Screenplay by: Dasaradh; Gopimohan; Trivikram Srinivas
- Dialogues by: Dasaradh
- Story by: Dasaradh
- Produced by: K. L. Narayana
- Starring: Nagarjuna; Gracy Singh; Shriya Saran; Prabhu Deva
- Cinematography: S. Gopal Reddy
- Edited by: K. V. Krishna Reddy
- Music by: R. P. Patnaik
- Production company: Sri Durga Arts
- Distributed by: Annapurna Studios; Supreme Audio; EVP International (Worldwide)
- Release date: 9 May 2002
- Running time: 150 minutes
- Country: India
- Language: Telugu
- Box office: ₹13 crore distributors' share

Santosham (transl. Happiness) is a 2002 Indian Telugu-language comedy drama film directed by Dasaradh who co-wrote the screenplay with Gopimohan and Trivikram Srinivas. It stars Nagarjuna, Gracy Singh and Shriya Saran in lead roles, with Prabhu Deva and K. Viswanath in supporting roles. The music was composed by R. P. Patnaik. The film won two Nandi Awards and two Filmfare Awards South.

Released on 9 May 2002, the film was well received by critics and was a blockbuster at the box office. It became the highest grossing film in Nagarjuna's career and was one of the highest grossing films of the year. It followed consecutive flops that Nagarjuna had suffered since 2000. It was dubbed in Tamil as Santhosha Vanille and in Hindi as Pehli Nazar ka Pehla Pyaar. The film was remade in Bengali as Bandhan (2004) and in Kannada as Ugadi (2007). The former film had some influence from the film, with some changes in the plot.

== Plot ==
Karthik is a rich architect in Ooty. He falls in love with Padmavathi "Padhu". Padhu is hesitant to accept and reciprocate Karthik's love, as she doesn't know what kind of a person he is. Padmavathi has a younger cousin named Bhanu. Bhanu encourages their love and gives courage to Padhu's feelings. When Padhu reveals her love, her father Ramachandrayya is enraged, and asks her to marry the guy he has chosen for her. Motivated by Bhanu's words, Padhu leaves a letter to her parents and elopes to marry Karthik. Angered by her actions, Ramachandrayya breaks off all ties with her.

Karthik and Padmavathi get married and migrate to New Zealand. Padhu later gives birth to a kid named Lucky. Padhu is very eager to get back to her parents and get their blessings, however, she dies in a car accident. Ramachandrayya has a huge joint family. A few of the family members opine that inviting Karthik and his kid to attend a forthcoming wedding at their place would allow him to get a closer look at Lucky.

When Karthik visits Ramachandrayya's place he gets mixed responses from different people in the house. Ramachandrayya doesn't like Karthik and others like him. Over some time, Karthik impresses them all and when he is about to go back to New Zealand, Ramachandrayya expresses his repentance for whatever happened and says that he is accepting Karthik as his son-in-law.

Bhanu has fallen in love with Karthik. But at the same time, there is Pawan - a childhood friend of Bhanu - who is deeply in love with her. Karthik returns to New Zealand. Bhanu along with Pawan visits Karthik. During that period, Bhanu gets closer to Karthik. When Karthik realizes her intentions, he fixes Pawan as her fiancée for her. Now Bhanu is about to marry Pawan.

Bhanu loves Karthik, but Karthik hesitates to repeat the history by marrying a girl against the wishes of her family. Just as Karthik is about to leave for good with his son, Ramachandrayya stops him from leaving and pleads with him to marry Bhanu. Also, Pawan comes and pleads with Karthik to marry Bhanu as he can tell that Bhanu is not happy about the marriage. The film has a happy ending with Karthik and Bhanu marrying.

== Cast ==
- Nagarjuna as Karthik
- Gracy Singh as Padmavathi aka Paddu, Karthik's wife (Voice Dubbed by Sunitha Upadrashta)
- Shriya Saran as Bhanu (Voice Dubbed by Savitha Radhakrishnan)
- Prabhu Deva as Pavan, Bhanu’s fiancee
- Kota Srinivasa Rao as Himsaraju / Vikram
- Brahmanandam as Giri from Mangalagiri
- Sunil as Kranthi Kumar / Seetayya
- Suhasini Maniratnam as Snehalatha, Karthik's mother
- Sarath Babu as Panduranga Rao, Karthik's father
- Paruchuri Venkateswara Rao as Venkatachalam, Ramachandrayya’s first brother and Bhanu’s father
- Chandra Mohan as Chandram, Ramachandrayya’s second brother and Seetayya’s father
- Pruthvi as Sriram, Karthik’s brother-in-law
- K. Viswanath as Ramachandrayya, Paddu’s father
- Ahuti Prasad as Prasad, Paddu’s first brother
- Banerjee as Suri, Paddu’s second brother
- Preeti Nigam as Rani, Prasad’s wife
- Sumithra as Lakshmi, Paddu’s mother
- Sudha as Savitri, Bhanu’s mother
- Tanikella Bharani as Narayana Murthy, Abbulu’s father
- Melkote as Paddu’s manager
- L. B. Sriram as Srisailam, Paddu’s grandfather
- Vajja Venkata Giridhar as Wedding Abbulu
- Madhu Mani as Malika, Suri’s wife
- Indu Anand as Chandram’s wife and Seetayya’s mother
- Anitha Chowdary as Anitha, Karthik’s sister
- Lahari as Durga
- Aajaam
- Swapna
- Devisri
- Saraswatamma
- Nikhil Panda as Lucky, Karthik and Paddu’s son
- Sophiya Haque as in item song

== Production ==
The film was shot in New Zealand and Ooty.

== Soundtrack ==
Santosham

Film score by R. P. Patnaik
- Released: 2002
- Genre: Soundtrack
- Length: 29:59
- Label: Supreme Music
- Producer: R. P. Patnaik

R. P. Patnaik chronology
Nuvvu Leka Nenu Lenu (2002)	Santosham (2002)	Jayam (2003)

The music was composed by R. P. Patnaik. The music was released on SUPREME Music Company.

No.	Title	Lyrics	Singer(s)	Length
1.	"Nuvvante Nakishtamani"	Sirivennela Sitaramasastri	Rajesh, Usha	5:01
2.	"Dhimdhinaktari Naktithom"	Kulasekhar	Shankar Mahadevan	4:22
3.	"So Much To Say"	Chandra Siddhartha	Rajesh	1:57
4.	"Devude Digivachina"	Kulasekhar	KK, Usha	4:00
5.	"Ne Tolisariga"	Sirivennela Sitaramasastri	Usha	4:51
6.	"Mehbooba Mehbooa"	Vishwa	Mano, Bhargavi, Vishwa	4:07
7.	"Emaindho Emo Naalo"	Kulasekhar	Rajesh	1:15
8.	"Diri Diri Diridee"	Kulasekhar	KK, Usha	4:21
Total length:				29:59

== Reception ==
A critic from Sify wrote that "Debutant director Dasarath has done a fairly decent job, and the music of R.P.Patnaik has good hummable melodies". A critic from Idlebrain.com wrote that "First half of the film is entertaining. The beginning of second half is little boring. But the director got the audiences back into his grip half an hour before climax". A critic from Full Hyderabad wrote that "I recommend this movie to people who enjoy musical/romantic movies and to Nag fans". Andhra Today wrote "Though the story has an old formula the director gives a feel-good treatment for the entire movie with a good mix of entertainment and fun.The director showed lot of confidence in deftly handling various situations in the movie".

== Awards ==
Nandi Awards - 2002

- Best Actor - Akkineni Nagarjuna
- Third Best Feature Film - Bronze - K. L. Narayana

Filmfare Awards South

- Best Film - Telugu - K. L. Narayana
- Best Music Director - Telugu - R. P. Patnaik

Awards
Preceded by Nuvvu Nenu	Filmfare Best Film Award (Telugu); 2002	Succeeded by Okkadu
