= Gemeni (film) =

- Poster
- Directed by: Saran
- Written by: Saran; Posani Krishna Murali (dialogue)
- Based on: Gemini (Tamil)
- Produced by: M. Saravanan; M. Balasubramanian; M. S. Guhan; B. Gurunath
- Starring: Venkatesh; Namitha; Kalabhavan Mani
- Cinematography: A. Venkatesh
- Edited by: Suresh Urs
- Music by: RP Patnaik
- Production companies: AVM Productions; Suresh Productions (presents)
- Distributed by: Suresh Productions
- Release date: 11 October 2002
- Running time: 132 minutes
- Country: India
- Language: Telugu

Gemeni is a 2002 Indian Telugu-language action film directed by Saran and produced by M. Saravanan via AVM Productions. It stars Venkatesh and Namitha, with Kalabhavan Mani and Murali, who reprising their roles from the original Tamil film. The music was composed by R. P. Patnaik. It is a remake of the Tamil film Gemini, released the same year. The film's title was spelt Gemeni to differentiate it from the original Tamil version.

== Plot ==
Gemeni and Ladda, are two gangsters in Vijayawada. Gemeni's friend is murdered by Ladda's friend. Gemeni and his gang find the person who murdered his friend and kill him. This incident marks the start of their rivalry.

Meanwhile, Gemeni meets Manisha Natwarlal and falls in love with her. To gain her affections, he goes to study in an evening college as her classmate, and eventually, she too falls in love with him.

Gemeni and Ladda clash again for a market holdout. Using his brilliant tactics, Gemeni fools and wins against Ladda which drives him crazy. In the meantime, Vijayawada gets a new Police Commissioner in Narendranath Chowdary. He arrests both Gemeni and Ladda. Understanding their rivalry, Narendranath puts them in a private cell so they can beat each other to death and at the same time can put a finish line to rowdyism. But instead, Gemeni convinces Ladda to plead Narendranath Chowdary to give them a chance to lead a normal life. Gemeni's trick works and they both are given a chance. While Gemeni changes his life, Ladda does not change his life. He keeps on disturbing Gemeni and wants him to help him out in his business. But instead, Gemeni informs about Ladda and his activities to Narendranath Chowdary. So, now Ladda is in jail. Meanwhile, Gemeni tries to reunite with Manisha as he had changed now and eventually she does forgive him.

After some months, Chowdary gets transferred as the transport DG of Andhra Pradesh and the new Police Commissioner, Kumaraswamy arrives, but to Gemeni's bad luck he is corrupt and releases Ladda from jail. Now, Ladda and the new Commissioner urge Gemeni to help him in his business. But, he still tries to stay away from them.

Forcing Gemeni to return to his old business, he would later kill Gemeni's right hand and who's also a best friend to him. Then in the climax, Gemeni tricks the Kumaraswamy to kill Ladda. Then, Kumaraswamy is transferred as transport DGP and Viswanath becomes the new Commissioner of Police. The film ends with Gemeni starting to lead a fresh life with Manisha.

== Cast ==
- Venkatesh as "Patamatalanka" Gemeni
- Namitha as Manisha Natwarlal (credited as Bhairavi)
- Kalabhavan Mani as Ladda
- Kota Srinivasa Rao as Police Commissioner Kumaraswamy
- Murali as Police Commissioner Narendranath Chowdary / Transport DG
- Brahmanandam as Car Mechanic
- Posani Krishna Murali as Hand
- Sudhakar as Kanna
- Mumtaj as Kamini
- Sujatha as Annamma
- Venu Madhav as Car Mechanic
- Ahuti Prasad as ASP
- Gundu Hanumantha Rao
- Krishna Bhagavan
- Lakshmipati as Gemeni's lawyer
- Raghu Babu as Krishna Babu
- Raghunatha Reddy as Night College Principal
- Vizag Prasad as Kandula Satyam
- Surya as Annamma's slain son and Ladda's gang member
- Kadambari Kiran as Manikyam
- Devi Charan as College student
- TK Hari
- Kandal Rao
- Babar
- Balaji
- Bhargav
- Ramana
- Chandu
- Ramesh
- Madhusudhan Rao as Bhatia's henchman
- Radha Krishna
- Sravan Kumar
- Nagaraju
- Srikanth Rao
- Anil
- Pavan
- Ashalata
- Preethi
- Manu Shetty

== Soundtrack ==
Gemeni

Film score by RP Patnaik
- Released: 2002
- Genre: Soundtrack
- Length: 30:46
- Label: Aditya Music
- Producer: RP Patnaik

RP Patnaik chronology
Holi (2002)	Gemeni (2002)	Nee Sneham (2002)

Music composed by RP Patnaik. The song "Oh Podu" from the original was retained as "Cheli Chedugudu". In an audio review, Sreya Sunil of Idlebrain.com wrote, "This album definitely does not meet the expectations surrounding it". The audio launch took place at Ramanaidu Studios on 15 September 2002. Music released on Aditya Music Company.

No.	Title	Lyrics	Singer(s)	Length
1.	"Cheli Chedugudu"	Veturi	S. P. Balasubrahmanyam, Anuradha Sriram	4:04
2.	"Pulalo Tene"	Veturi	Rajesh	4:16
3.	"Dil Diwana"	Veturi	Usha	4:15
4.	"Brahma Oh"	Kulasekhar	S. P. Balasubrahmanyam	4:13
5.	"Chukkallo"	Veturi	Vandemataram Srinivas	2:58
6.	"Bandhame"	Veturi	RP Patnaik	2:35
7.	"Nadaka Chuste"	Veturi	Shankar Mahadevan, Usha	4:12
8.	"Cheli Chedugudu (Version 2)"	Veturi	S. P. Balasubrahmanyam, Anuradha Sriram
Total length:				30:46

== Reception ==
Jeevi of Idlebrain.com rated the film 2/5 and wrote, "The film starts off on an interesting style and goes into boring mode as the interval approaches. The second half of the film is pathetic" and added that "The film looks pretty artificial and lacks soul".
