= Jai (2004 Telugu film) =

- Film poster
- Directed by: Teja
- Written by: Teja
- Produced by: Teja
- Starring: Navdeep; Santhoshi; Ayesha Jhulka; Salim Baig; Tanikella Bharani
- Cinematography: Ravi Varman
- Edited by: Shankar
- Music by: Anup Rubens
- Production company: Chitram Movies
- Release date: 25 March 2004
- Country: India
- Language: Telugu

Jai is a 2004 Indian Telugu-language romantic drama film written and directed by Teja, and produced by Chitram Movies. It stars Santhoshi, Ayesha Jhulka, and Navdeep in his film debut. The movie follows an amateur boxer from Hyderabad who challenges his rival from Pakistan to a match.

The film was dubbed and partially reshot in Tamil as Jairam.

== Plot ==
Jairam, the only son of a wealthy businesswoman, is an academically gifted college student who leads an indulgent lifestyle. Jai's father was killed in the Kargil War when he was a child, and his mother takes frequent trips abroad to broker commercial deals, often neglecting her son. Jai tries to convince his mother to cancel an upcoming trip to Karachi, to no avail. Jai later meets and falls in love with Farah, whose father Mustafa owns a cafe in the Old City of Hyderabad. After Jai is injured in a fight at school, Mustafa reluctantly begins to teach him boxing.

Jai's mother calls him from Dubai and expresses her disapproval of Jai's relationship with Farah, due to the latter's religion. A crestfallen Jai later celebrates his birthday with Farah. While driving with Farah later that night, Jai is ambushed and beaten by a group of Farah's family members, who warn Jai to stay away from Farah. An angered Jai continues his boxing training with greater intensity, and starts to show significant improvement.

While in Karachi, Jai's mother agrees to stage an "India vs. Pakistan" boxing match in Hyderabad. Shortly afterwards, a Pakistani team arrives in Hyderabad, led by boxer Shakib Akram. Jai is left to organize the match, which takes place in a crowded hall filled with Indian and Pakistani supporters. Shakib emerges victorious after a brutal fight, knocking out India's challenger Aniruddh Singh, and boasts that even after 56 years of independence, Indians are helpless to prevent Pakistanis from defeating them. An infuriated Jai runs into the ring, confronts Shakib, and challenges him to a match in 56 days. It is later revealed that Shakib is a member of Pakistan's Inter-Services Intelligence, and was sent to India by Masood Azhar, the chief of the jihadist militant group Lashkar-e-Taiba.

A determined Jai continues to train with Mustafa, focusing on increasing the weight and strength of his punches. During the course of his training, Jai faces frequent interference from Shakib's team members. One morning, Jai goes on a training run near the Makkah Masjid while Mustafa steps away to perform namaz. Jai is ambushed by a group of Shakib's allies, who crush his right hand and drop a heavy stone onto his chest before being driven away by Mustafa and the rest of the congregation. Jai is taken to a local hospital, where the doctor informs him that he has suffered torn ligaments in his hand and multiple rib fractures, and will need to rest for several months.

Refusing to postpone the boxing challenge, Jai wraps his right hand in a cast and continues to train with the support of Farah and Mustafa, using only his left hand to throw punches. After 15 days, Jai faces Shakib in the match, which is monitored by Masood Azhar and several Lashkar-e-Taiba members on live television. During the match, Shakib targets Jai's ribs and scores multiple knockdowns. Jai refuses to let Mustafa throw in the towel and surprises Shakib by throwing a barrage of punches with his injured right hand in the ninth round, knocking Shakib unconscious and winning the match. After the final bell, Masood Azhar switches off the television in disgust while Jai begins singing Vande Mataram along with the jubilant crowd.

== Cast ==
- Navdeep as Jairam, also known as Jai
- Santhoshi as Farah
- Ayesha Jhulka as Jai's mother
- Salim Baig as Shakib
- Tanikella Bharani as Mustafa
- Abhinayashree
- Venu Madhav as Sachin Undulkar, the school principal
- Duvvasi Mohan as an auto rickshaw driver
- Venu Yeldandi as Jai's friend
- Geetha Singh as Farah's friend
- Chammak Chandra as Sheikh's supporter
- Dhanraj
- Junior Relangi as a college professor
- Chitti Babu as a priest

Tamil version

- Pandiarajan as Sachin Undulkar, the school principal
- Chinni Jayanth as an auto rickshaw driver
- Madhan Bob
- Chitti Babu as a chemistry professor

== Production ==
The film was shot in Hyderabad, Pollachi, and Chalakudy.

== Soundtrack ==
The music was composed by Anup Rubens and released by Sohan Audio. Lyrics for the soundtrack were written by Kulasekhar.

Jai

Soundtrack album by Anup Rubens
- Released: 2004
- Recorded: 2004
- Genre: Soundtrack
- Length: 36:37
- Label: Sohan Audio
- Producer: Anup Rubens

Anup Rubens chronology
Jai (2004)	Dhairyam (2005)

Telugu Track list
No.	Title	Singer(s)	Length
1.	"Jai Jai"	Master Manu, Anup Rubens, Tippu	4:51
2.	"Enni Ashalo"	Shreya Ghoshal	4:48
3.	"O Manasa O Manasa"	Anup Rubens, Usha	4:52
4.	"One Two Three"	Tippu	5:07
5.	"Vandemataram (Desam Manade)"	Hemachandra, Sravana Bhargavi	4:25
6.	"Nee Kosame"	Mallikarjun, K. S. Chithra	5:32
7.	"Naa Chethilona"	Sumangali	3:05
8.	"Chuttammo"	Lalitha	3:57
Total length:			36:37

Tamil Track list

- "Dama Dama" - Shankar Mahadevan
- "Chinna Nenjile" - Sumangali
- "Oh Manase" - S. P. B. Charan
- "Vande Matharam" - Baby Vaishali, Harish Raghavendra
- "Un Kaiyil" - Sujatha Mohan
- "Kannin Maniye" - Malliga Arun, K. S. Chithra
- "Suruttamma" - Anuradha Sriram, Manikka Vinayagam
- "Music Bit" - Anup Rubens

== Reception ==
The film received mixed reviews from critics, who criticized the jingoistic themes of the screenplay and the logical inconsistency of Pakistani characters speaking Telugu instead of Urdu. A review from Idlebrain.com rated the film 3/5 and wrote that "Instead of concentrating more on what he is good at, director Teja has chosen to elaborate and exploit the patriotism aspect. He failed in getting emotions right through patriotic episodes". Similarly, a critic from Sify wrote that "On the whole Jai is packaged with patriotism and Paki-bashing and lacks logic and finesse."
