= Sreeram =

- Poster
- Directed by: V. N. Aditya
- Written by: Dharani; Paruchuri Brothers
- Story by: Dharani
- Based on: Dhill (Tamil)
- Produced by: Burugapally Siva Rama Krishna
- Starring: Uday Kiran; Anita Hassanandani; Ashish Vidyarthi
- Cinematography: Sivakumar
- Edited by: Marthand K. Venkatesh
- Music by: R. P. Patnaik
- Release date: 21 June 2002
- Country: India
- Language: Telugu

Sreeram (Note: Spelt as Shri Raam on the CBFC certificate.) is a 2002 Indian Telugu-language action masala film directed by V. N. Aditya and produced by Burugapally Siva Rama Krishna. It stars Uday Kiran, Anita, and Ashish Vidyarthi in lead roles. Music was composed by R. P. Patnaik. It is a remake of the Tamil film, Dhill (2001), which starred Vikram and Laila. The film was an average grosser at the box office. An unrelated namesake sequel titled Jai Sriram was released in 2013.

== Plot ==
Sriram (Uday Kiran) wants to become a cop. Madhu (Anitha) is the sister of Sriram's brother-in-law. Circle Inspector "Encounter" Shankar misbehaves with Madhu which causes a fight between Sriram and Shankar. Shankar decides to take revenge on Sriram by filing a false report during police verification about sub-inspector selections and also kills Sriram's dearest friend. Finally Sriram confronts and kills him.

== Cast ==
- Uday Kiran as Sreeram Kumar
- Anita Hassanandani as Madhu
- Ashish Vidyarthi as C.I. "Encounter" Shankar
- Siva Krishna as Police Officer Narayana
- Brahmanandam as Seenu, Sreeram's friend
- Sunil as Bose
- Easwari Rao as Satyavathi, Madhu's mother
- Sudha as Amrutham, Sreeram's mother
- Paruchuri Venkateswara Rao as Venkatachalam, Sreeram's father
- Chandra Mohan as Chandram, Madhu's father
- Deepa Venkat as Kamala, Sreeram's sister
- Tanikella Bharani as Minister Subba Rayudu
- Dharmavarapu Subramanyam as Constable Siva
- Narsing Yadav as Das, Subba Rayudu's henchman
- Kaushal Manda as Sreeram's friend
- Satyam Rajesh as Sreeram's friend
- Lakshmipathi as Lakshmipathi
- Kadambari Kiran as Politician
- M. S. Narayana as Narayana
- Devadas Kanakala
- Kiran Rathod in a special appearance in the song "Pedavullo Pepsicola"

== Soundtrack ==
Music was composed by R. P. Patnaik. Chandrabose and Kulasekhar wrote two songs each, Kulasekhar wrote one more song in collaboration with R. P. Patnaik. Sirivennela Seetharama Sastry wrote one song. Music was released by Aditya Music company. The tune of the song "Bulli Bulli" was inspired from the Odia folk song Rangabati.

Sreeram

Soundtrack album by R. P. Patnaik
- Released: 2002
- Genre: Soundtrack
- Length: 26:21
- Language: Telugu
- Label: Aditya Music
- Producer: R. P. Patnaik

No.	Title	Lyrics	Singer(s)	Length
1.	"Maamaaray Majaray"	Chandrabose	R. P. Patnaik, Kousalya	4:23
2.	"Monalisa"	Chandrabose	S. P. B. Charan	4:20
3.	"Bulli Bulli"	Kulasekhar	R. P. Patnaik, Usha	4:49
4.	"Chinna Chirunavvutoti"	Kulasekhar	S. P. B. Charan, Usha	4:44
5.	"Tiya Tiyani Kalalanu"	R. P. Patnaik, Kulasekhar	Bombay Jayashri	3:44
6.	"Pedavullo Pepsicola"	Sirivennela Seetharama Sastry	R. P. Patnaik	04:21
Total length:				26:21

== Reception ==
Gudipoodi Srihari of The Hindu wrote that "The film can be summed up in two words: Violence Unlimited". A critic from Sify wrote that "The problem is that Uday is miscast as an action hero and the director is also not comfortable with this genre of movies. They are unsure about themselves which hinders the progress of narration".
