= Nandi Awards of 2003 =

Indian Telugu film and TV awards ceremony

The Nandi Awards are presented annually in Andhra Pradesh, For Telugu cinema by State government. "Nandi" means "bull", the awards being named after the big granite bull at Lepakshi — a cultural and historical symbol of Andhra Pradesh. Nandi Awards are presented in four categories: Gold, Silver, Bronze, and Copper.

== 2003 Nandi Awards Winners List ==
Category	Winner	Film
Best Feature Film	Missamma	Missamma
Second Best Feature Film	Okkadu	Okkadu
Third Best Feature Film	Amma Nanna O Tamila Ammayi	Amma Nanna O Tamila Ammayi
Nandi Award for Akkineni Award for best home-viewing feature film	Neeku Nenu Naaku Nuvvu	Neeku Nenu Naaku Nuvvu
Best Children's Film	Hero	Hero
Second Best Children's Film	Nandini	Nandini
Best Screenplay Writer	Neelakanta	Missamma
Best Debut Actor	Allu Arjun	Gangotri
Best Actor	Mahesh Babu	Nijam
Best Actress	Bhumika Chawla	Missamma
Best Dialogue Writer	Puri Jagannadh	Amma Nanna O Tamila Ammayi
Best Director	Gunasekhar	Okkadu
Best Villain	Prakash Raj	Gangotri
Best Male Comedian	M. S. Narayana	Sivamani
Best Female Comedian	Kovai Sarala	Ori Nee Prema Bangaram Kanu
Best Child Actor	Master Ram Teja	Hero
Best Child Actress	Baby Nandini	Nandini
Best Supporting Actress	Talluri Rameshwari	Nijam
Best Director for a Children's Film	B. Narasimha Rao	
Best Story Writer	Yeleti Chandra Sekhar	Aithe
Best Audiographer	Madhusudhan Reddy	Aithe
Best Lyricist	C. Narayanareddy	Seethaiah (Idhigo rayalaseema gadda ...)
Best Art Director	Ashok Kumar	Okkadu
Best Music Director	Mani Sharma	Okkadu
Best Male Playback Singer	S. P. Balasubrahmanyam	Seethaiah (Idhigo rayalaseema gadda ...)
Best Female Playback Singer	Sunitha	Athade Oka Sainyam (Naa Paata Teta Telugu Paata...)
Best Editor	A. Sreekar Prasad	Okkadu
Best Choreographer	Raju Sundaram	Cheppave Chirugali
Best Cinematographer	Sekhar V. Joseph	Okkadu
Best First Film of a Director	Rasool Ellore	Okariki Okaru
Best Costume Designer	Rambabu	Vasantham
Best Makeup Artist	Anji Babu	Harivillu
Best Fight Master	Raghavan	Okkadu
Best Male Dubbing Artist	Sivaji	Dil
Best Female Dubbing Artist	Savitha Reddy	Missamma
Best Film Critic on Telugu Cinema	Reddy Hanumantha Rao	
Special Jury Award	S.N Ashok	Vasantham
Special Jury Award	N.V Prasad	Vasantham
Special Jury Award	Prabha	Vegu Chukkalu
Special Jury Award	Pavan Malhotra	Aithe
Special Jury Award	P. Nagalakshmi	Tiger Harish Chandra Prasad
Special Jury Award	Janjanam Subbarao	Satta
