= Swagatam =

2008 Telugu film by Dasarath

- Movie Poster
- Directed by: Dasarath
- Written by: Dasarath (story / dialogues)
- Screenplay by: Gopimohan
- Produced by: Aditya Ram
- Starring: Jagapathi Babu; Anushka; Bhumika
- Cinematography: R. Ramesh Babu
- Edited by: M. R. Varma
- Music by: R. P. Patnaik
- Production company: Adityaram Movies
- Release date: 25 January 2008
- Running time: 154 minutes
- Country: India
- Language: Telugu

Swagatam (transl. Welcome) is a 2008 Telugu-language romantic drama film directed by Dasarath. The film stars Jagapathi Babu, Anushka Shetty and Bhumika, with Arjun in a special role. The music was composed by R. P. Patnaik. It was later dubbed into Tamil as America to Aminjaikarai in 2013.

== Plot ==
The film begins in the United States, where Sailaja "Sailu," a struggling woman, works hard to make ends meet. She is deeply attached to her sister Deepthi's son, Chiku, and resents Deepthi's husband, Srikanth, whom she believes caused her sister's death in an accident and remarried soon after. Despite her animosity, Chiku longs for Srikanth's affection. Sailu runs a textile business in a diverse colony, but the business is on the verge of closing, and she also takes on a second job to keep it afloat.

The situation changes when Krishna, a widower known as KK, moves into the colony with his daughter Janaki. He opens a shop near Sailu's, leading to a rivalry between the two. However, after several conflicts, KK manages to win Sailu's trust and helps revive her failing business. Sailu later learns that KK is actually Srikanth's best friend, who had been quietly helping them. KK reveals the truth about the accident: Deepthi was the one at fault, and Srikanth had blamed himself for not trying to save her. As a result, Srikanth remarried the woman he had accidentally hurt. Sailu apologises to Srikanth, and Chiku begins to bond with him.

Later, Sailu discovers that KK's wife, Vidya, is still alive, contrary to what she had believed. KK shares his past with Sailu, explaining that he was once a rigid and workaholic person who rejected many many matrimonial alliances. His grandmother, frustrated with his attitude, sought the help of a marriage bureau, which connected him to Vidya. Vidya helped transform KK's outlook on life, and they fell in love, eventually having a daughter together. However, Vidya was diagnosed with chronic leukemia, leading to a heartbreaking decision to distance herself from KK and their child to avoid causing them pain.

Vidya continued her treatment with Srikanth, who helped extend her life. Before her death, Vidya expressed her desire to see Krishna happy and requested that Sailu step into her place. Sailu and Vidya eventually meet and become friends. Vidya passes away in Krishna's arms, leaving a letter for Sailu, asking her to replace her in Krishna's life. The film ends on a hopeful note, with Sailu preparing to express her love to Krishna, honouring Vidya's final wish.

== Cast ==
- Jagapati Babu as K.K. / Krishna
- Bhumika Chawla as Vidya Krishna
- Anushka Shetty as Sailaja a.k.a. "Sailu"
- Arjun as Srikanth
- Dharmavarapu Subramanyam as Srinu Ganepudi
- Ali as Jilal Khan
- Sunil as Sunil Honda
- Asha Saini as Deepthi
- Venu Madhav as Peon
- Mallikarjuna Rao as RV Sukara
- M. S. Narayana as Detroit Nageswara Rao
- L. B. Sriram
- Ravi Babu as Padmakar "Padhu" Mudumba
- Banerjee as Ram Pasumarthy
- Jaya Prakash Reddy
- Sarath Babu
- Sudha as Lakshmi Durga
- Rama Prabha as Saru
- Satyam Rajesh as Servant
- Melkote as Dr. Chitti
- Raja Ravindra as Dr. Ravi
- Prabhakar as RV Sukara
- Lakshmipathi as Sesha Reddy
- Chitti Babu
- Gundu Sudarshan
- Gautam Raju
- Radha Kumari
- Jhansi as Supraja
- Kadambari Kiran
- Medha Bahri
- Likitha Kamini
- Madhurisen
- Baby Annie as K.K.'s daughter

== Production ==
The US backdrop of the film bears some resemblance to Kal Ho Naa Ho (2003), while the car crash aspect draws inspiration from An Unfinished Life (2005).

== Music ==
Swagatam

Film score by R. P. Patnaik
- Released: 2008
- Genre: Soundtrack
- Length: 26:06
- Label: Aditya Music
- Producer: R. P. Patnaik

R. P. Patnaik chronology
Lakshmi Kalyanam (2007)	Swagatam (2008)	Naa Manasukemaindi (2008)

The music was composed by R. P. Patnaik and released on Aditya Music label.

No.	Title	Lyrics	Singer(s)	Length
1.	"Babooji Natho"	Kaluva Krishna Sai	R.P.Patnaik, Geetha Madhuri	4:10
2.	"Manasa Mounama"	Veturi	Karthik, K. S. Chithra	3:58
3.	"Kotta Kottaga"	Kulasekhar	Madhushree	4:15
4.	"Unnannalu"	Bhaskarabhatla	Tippu	4:17
5.	"Okarikokaru"	Kulasekhar	S. P. B. Charan, Madhusri	5:29
6.	"Oohala Pate"	Veturi	S. P. Balasubrahmanyam	3:57
Total length:				26:06

== Reception ==
=== Critical response ===
AndhraCafe praised Bhumika's performance and her chemistry with Jagapathi Babu but criticised the first half, climax, and music, calling the film "below average."

Rediff.com noted that the film takes a "safe, oft-trodden path" but appreciated the performances, particularly in the entertaining first half. The review predicted it would appeal to viewers who enjoy "mushy stuff."

=== Box office ===
Several weeks after its release, The Times of India described the film as a box office "let down."
