= Manalo Okkadu =

Indian Telugu-language drama film

- Release poster
- Directed by: R. P. Patnaik
- Produced by: Gurajala Jagan Mohan
- Starring: R. P . Patnaik; Anita Hassanandani; Sai Kumar
- Cinematography: SJ Siddharth
- Edited by: S. B. Uddhav
- Music by: R. P. Patnaik
- Release date: 4 November 2016
- Country: India
- Language: Telugu

Manalo Okkadu (transl. One among us) is a 2016 Indian Telugu-language drama film directed by R. P. Patnaik and starring himself, Anita Hassanandani, P. Sai Kumar and Tanikella Bharani. It was released theatrically on 4 November 2016.

== Plot ==
Manalo Okkadu is a persistent attack on the egos within the media. Which throws light on how an innocent lecturer from a college is wrongly framed by the media as a molester and his journey back to dignity.

== Cast ==
- R. P. Patnaik as Krishnamurthy
- Anita Hassanandani
- P. Sai Kumar
- Nassar
- Tanikella Bharani
- Jayaprakash Reddy
- Sreemukhi
- Raghu Babu
- Benerjee
- Gollapudi Maruti Rao
- Raja Ravindra
- Gundu Sudarshan
- Sameer
- Duvvasi Mohan
- Vajja Venkata Giridhar
- Sri Gouri Priya

== Reception ==
A critic from The Hindu says "Stretching close to 150 minutes, the film lacks any cinematographic and musical appeal. But for the climax twist, where you’re genuinely surprised, the lack of a narrative high hurts its cause. Perhaps, that’s the reason you relate with the Yesudas’ track titled ‘Kalikaalam’". A critic from Samayam wrote "The story is carried somewhat well but misses the tempo at some places. How a person who has lost his dignity due to the media regained his dignity with his intelligence. How he reminded the media of its responsibility is the key in the movie".
