= Greeku Veerudu =

2013 film by Dasaradh

- Theatrical release poster
- Directed by: Dasarath
- Screenplay by: Hari Krishna; M. S. Ravindra
- Story by: Dasarath
- Produced by: D. Siva Prasad Reddy
- Starring: Nagarjuna Akkineni; Nayanthara
- Cinematography: Anil Bandhari
- Edited by: Marthand K. Venkatesh
- Music by: S. Thaman
- Production company: Kamakshi Movies
- Distributed by: BlueSky (Overseas)
- Release date: 3 May 2013
- Running time: 155 minutes
- Country: India
- Language: Telugu
- Box office: ₹13 crore distributors' share

Greeku Veerudu (transl. The Greek Warrior) is a 2013 Telugu-language romantic comedy film directed by Dasaradh. The film stars Nagarjuna and Nayanthara, with music composed by S. Thaman. It was dubbed into Tamil and Malayalam as Love Story and into Hindi as America V/s India.

== Plot ==
Chandu, a self-made and ruthless businessman in New York, runs a successful event organising agency with the help of his uncle Sundar and friends Bharath and Maya. Despite his professional success, Chandu rejects the concept of relationships and family, engaging in casual affairs with multiple women. Maya, secretly in love with him, marries an elderly wealthy doctor, Kamaraju, with the intention of robbing him. After divorcing Kamaraju and securing his money, Maya is heartbroken when Chandu dumps her and plans revenge.

Maya manipulates a business agreement between Chandu and another businessman, PR, regarding a charity event. The agreement stipulates that if the event fails, PR can recover the full consignment amount. When the show fails, PR demands payment, putting Chandu in financial trouble. Desperate for money, Chandu decides to visit his grandparents in India, whom he has not seen in years.

In India, Chandu reflects on his past. His father, Sanjay, had married an NRI woman against the wishes of his father, Ramakrishna Prasad, leading to his expulsion from the family. After Sanjay's death, Ramakrishna Prasad invited his daughter-in-law to return to India. Chandu witnesses his mother’s refusal to remarry, as she still mourns Sanjay, and she advises him to avoid relationships to prevent pain.

At the airport, Chandu meets Sandhya, a compassionate doctor volunteering at the Make-A-Wish Foundation. She helps terminally ill children fulfill their last wishes. Chandu befriends Sandhya, who is also travelling to India on the same flight. Upon arrival, Chandu learns that his family is financially dependent on Ramakrishna Prasad, with his nephews incapable of managing the affairs. To avoid complications, Chandu falsely claims to be married, planning to access 250 million from his father's trust, which requires proof of marriage for Chandu's wife to become a trustee.

Chandu asks Sandhya to pretend to be his wife to secure the funds, promising to sponsor three children from the Make-A-Wish Foundation. She agrees, and over time, Chandu develops genuine feelings for her, believing she is the reason for his transformation in views on family. A fake marriage is arranged to facilitate the transfer of funds and appoint Sandhya as a trustee. However, Chandu feels guilty and confesses the truth to Ramakrishna Prasad before leaving with Sandhya. Moved by Chandu's sincerity, Ramakrishna Prasad forgives him, signaling his acceptance of Chandu despite their past. Sandhya returns to New York without giving Chandu a chance to propose.

In New York, Sandhya arranges a secret meeting between Chandu and Maya, hoping to reunite them, as Chandu had told her that Maya hated him due to misunderstandings during their stay in India. During the meeting, Maya exposes Chandu's true nature to Sandhya, which angers her. Ramakrishna Prasad arrives in New York, provides Chandu with the funds necessary to clear his debts, and advises him to prove his transformation to Sandhya during their upcoming trip with the Make-A-Wish Foundation children.

Chandu accompanies Sandhya and the children, with Kamaraju reappearing as the doctor for the kids. Chandu works hard to demonstrate that he has changed and is sincerely in love with Sandhya, but his efforts fail to impress her. After fulfilling the second wish, Chandu invites Sandhya to dinner on her birthday to speak with her. PR, Sandhya's elder brother, arrives to celebrate her birthday but becomes angry after hearing their conversation. Sandhya promises to marry the man PR approves of, and Chandu agrees to never disturb her once the third wish is fulfilled. Chandu risks his life to fulfill the final wish, which convinces Sandhya of his sincerity.

To their surprise, PR and his associate Subrahmanyam meet them at the airport and arrange Sandhya's marriage to Subrahmanyam due to their enmity with Chandu. Devastated, Chandu decides to return to India for the "Seetha Ramula Kalyanam" event at his village temple. Although Chandu promised to attend with Sandhya, only he, Ramakrishna Prasad, and Sundar know the truth. Sundar stays behind in the village after falling in love with a local woman.

To Chandu's surprise, Sandhya arrives at the event with her family and Subrahmanyam's family. She promises Chandu to accompany him to the Kalyanam event once PR allows her to go. Kamaraju unexpectedly arrives as well, being Subrahmanyam's brother-in-law. After a series of comedic situations, all the families gather at the temple, where Chandu confesses the truth to his family. His family accepts him, and Sandhya reciprocates his love. Seeing their genuine bond, PR and Subrahmanyam abandon their plans and allow Chandu to marry Sandhya. The film ends with Chandu and Sandhya participating happily in the Kalyanam event, surrounded by their families and the villagers.

== Cast ==
- Nagarjuna Akkineni as Chandu
- Nayanthara as Sandhya
- Meera Chopra as Maya
- K. Viswanath as Ramakrishna Prasad, Chandu's grandfather
- Ashish Vidyarthi as PR
- Brahmanandam as Kamaraju
- Kota Srinivasa Rao
- Ali as Jori
- M. S. Narayana as Sundar
- Dharmavarapu Subramanyam
- Venu Madhav
- Raghu Babu
- Ravi Varma
- Bharath Reddy
- Vennela Kishore as Subrahmanyam
- Nagineedu as Subrahmanyam's father
- Sanjay Swaroop as Chandu's father
- Benarjee
- Thagubothu Ramesh as drunk taxi driver
- Giridhar as Kedarnath / Badrinath
- Y. Kasi Viswanath
- Ravi Mariya
- Supreeth
- Jenny
- Geetanjali as Chandu's grandmother
- Sudha
- Kovai Sarala as Mahalakshmi
- Venu Yeldandi
- Jaya Prakash Reddy
- Lahari Arundhati Vishnuvazhala
- Pradeep
- Meena
- Jaya Lakshmi
- Jayavani
- Deepthi Vajpai
- Master Abhi
- Master Gaurav Naidu
- Master Rakshith Varma
- Baby Kaveri
- TV9 Deepthi as herself

== Production ==
The film's title is based on a song from Ninne Pelladata (1996). Nagarjuna's look in the film was based on Orlando Bloom from Pirates of the Caribbean, Brad Pitt and Robert Downey Jr.'s look as Tony Stark.

== Music ==
Greeku Veerudu

Film score by S. Thaman
- Released: 2013
- Genre: Soundtrack
- Length: 25:35
- Label: Aditya Music
- Producer: S. Thaman

S. Thaman chronology
| Baadshah (2013) | Greeku Veerudu (2013) | Gouravam (2013) |

The music was composed by S. Thaman. Audio soundtrack was released on Aditya Music label. Greeku Veerudu audio has been released on 3 April 2013 at Shilpakala Vedika, Nagarjuna with his entire family has attended the event.

| No. | Title | Lyrics | Singer(s) | Length |
|---|---|---|---|---|
| 1. | "I Hate Love Story's" | Krishna Chaitanya | Ranjith, Naveen Madhav | 3:36 |
| 2. | "Ne Vinnadi Nijamena" | Balaji | Ranjith | 3:31 |
| 3. | "O Naadu Washington" | Sahithi | S. P. Balasubrahmanyam | 4:51 |
| 4. | "Ee Parikshalo" | Sirivennela Seetarama Sastry | Haricharan, Vandana Srinivasan | 3:27 |
| 5. | "Yevvaru Lerani" | Vanamali | Mallikarjun | 4:39 |
| 6. | "Osina Bangaram" | Ananta Sriram | Hemachandra, M. M. Manasi | 3:26 |
| 7. | "Maro Janme" | Balaji | Rahul Nambiar | 2:26 |
| 8. | "Nee Gundello" | | M. L. R. Karthikeyan | 1:24 |
| Total length: | | | | 25:35 |

== Reception ==
The film received mixed-to-positive reviews upon release and completed a 50-day run.
