= Swamy (2004 film) =

Indian Telugu-language action drama film

- DVD cover
- Directed by: VR Pratap
- Written by: Posani Krishna Murali (dialogues)
- Screenplay by: VR Pratap
- Story by: Posani Krishna Murali
- Produced by: RK Bhagavan; Teja (C Kalyan)
- Starring: Harikrishna; Meena; Uma; Rajiv Kanakala
- Cinematography: Madhu A Naidu
- Music by: M. M. Keeravani
- Production company: Krishna Teja Productions
- Release date: 16 July 2004
- Country: India
- Language: Telugu

Swamy is a 2004 Indian Telugu-language action drama film directed by VR Pratap and starring Harikrishna, Meena, Uma and Rajiv Kanakala.

== Cast ==
- Harikrishna as Swamy
- Meena as Swamy's wife
- Aamani as medical college principal
- Uma in a dual role as Seeta and Geeta
- Rajiv Kanakala as Anand
- Jaya Prakash Reddy
- Tanikella Bharani
- Mohan Raj
- Nutan Prasad as judge
- Jeeva
- Banerjee
- Raghu Babu
- Chalapati Rao as taxi driver
- Srinivasa Reddy
- Duvvasi Mohan
- Venu Madhav
- Brahmanandam
- Asha Saini (item number in the song "Driver Lekha")

== Soundtrack ==
The soundtrack composed by M. M. Keeravani in his third collaboration with Harikrishna. The songs were well received.

Track listing
No.	Title	Lyrics	Singer(s)	Length
1.	"Chilaka O Chilaka"	E. S. Murthy	Mano, Usha, Rama Mani	5:12
2.	"Naa Peru Rambha"	Bhuvana Chandra	Shreya Ghoshal	4:49
3.	"Andham Chandam"	Pothula Ravi Kiran	M. M. Keeravani, Sunitha Upadrashta	4:50
4.	"Aanati Nee Kallu"	Veturi Sundararama Murthy	M. M. Keeravani	3:15
5.	"Driver Lekha (Tamilnadu Border)"	Chandrabose	Mano, Sunitha Upadrashta	5:47
Total length:				23:53

== Reception ==
A critic from Sify opined that "On the whole the film has nothing new to offer". Jeevi of Idlebrain.com gave the film a rating of two out of five and wrote that "The plus points of the film are Hari Krishna and visual effects. The minus points are story, dialogues, screenplay and direction". Telugu Cinema wrote "Though posani cliams it is inspired by the real life incidents the dialogues and picturisations sans the originality. At times they are cheap".
