= Gharga =

2026 Indian Kannada-language film by M. Shashidhar

- Directed by: M. Shashidhar
- Written by: M. Shashidhar
- Produced by: Asshwini Ramprasaad
- Starring: Arun Ramprasad; P. Sai Kumar; Sampath Raj
- Cinematography: Guru Prasad Narnad
- Edited by: M. Shashidhar
- Music by: Score: Sukumar; Shri Hari; Songs: Gurukiran; R. P. Patnaik; Shri Hari; C. Girinadh
- Production company: ARC Musicq Pvt Ltd
- Release date: 6 February 2026
- Running time: 118 minutes
- Country: India
- Language: Kannada

Gharga is a 2026 Indian Kannada-language mystery thriller film written and directed by M. Shashidhar and, produced by Ashwini Ramprasad. The film features Arun Ramprasad, P. Sai Kumar and Sampath Raj in important roles.

The film was released theatrically on 6 February 2026.

== Plot ==
The film follows a novelist and researcher who travels to a mysterious village named Gharga while investigating unexplained incidents connected to a missing writer. As he delves deeper into the secrets of the region, he encounters hidden identities, folklore-driven beliefs and criminal conspiracies.

== Cast ==
- Arun Ramprasad as Vikram Adiga aka Aryan
- P. Sai Kumar as Gajanana Aithala
- Sampath Raj
- Rahul Dev
- Dev Gill
- Sravan Raghavendra
- Arun Sagar as Pundarika
- Mithra
- Raagavi Gowda

== Music ==
The soundtrack is composed by Gurukiran, R. P. Patnaik, Shri Hari and C. Girinadh. The background score is composed by Sukumar and Shri Hari

Track listing
No.	Title	Lyrics	Music	Singer(s)	Length
1.	"Vennela Thunaka"	V. Nagendra Prasad	Shri Hari	Nadeera Banu	3:11
2.	"Bangi Sediro"	V. Nagendra Prasad	Gurukiran	Vijay Prakash, Gurukiran	4:29
3.	"Neenu Nanage"	A. P. Arjun	R. P. Patnaik	Yazin Nizar	3:53
4.	"Call Of Rudra"		C. Girinandh	Deepak	2:22

== Release and reception ==
Gharga was released in theatres on 6 February 2026 across Karnataka.

A Sharadhaa of Cinema Express rated it 3 out of 5 and was positive towards the screenplay. Y Maheshwara Reddy of Bangalore Mirror rated it 2.5 out of 5 and stated that, "it is filled with actors, but the roles are so shallow that it is not clear why they appear and disappear from the screen". Susmita Sameera of The Times of India stated it as "an ambitious mystery lost in its own shadows" and gave a rating of 2 out of 5. Deccan Herald rated it 1.5 out of 5 and described it as an ambitious mystery drama that struggles with narrative coherence.
