= Happy Journey (2025 film) =

Indian Telugu-language drama film

- Promotional poster
- Directed by: Chaithanya Konda
- Produced by: Gangadhar Peddakonda
- Starring: Hariharan Kone; Ishani Ghosh
- Cinematography: U. Aruna Gnanavel
- Edited by: Kondaveeti Ravi Kumar
- Music by: Chaitanya Raja
- Production company: Future Bright Films
- Release date: 21 November 2025
- Country: India
- Language: Telugu

Happy Journey is a 2025 Indian Telugu-language drama film written and directed by Chaithanya Konda. The film is produced by Gangadhar Peddakonda under the banner Future Bright Films. It stars Hariharan Kone and Ishani Ghosh in major roles. The film is scheduled to be released on 21 November 2025.

== Cast ==
- Hariharan Kone
- Ishani Ghosh
- V6 Satyana
- Anand Bharathi
- Sanjay Raichura
- Krishna Teja
- Duvvasi Mohan

== Production ==
The film is written and directed by Chaithanya Konda. It is produced by Gangadhar Peddakonda under Future Bright Films. Cinematography is handled by U. Aruna Gnanavel, while editing is carried out by Kondaveeti Ravi Kumar. The music and background score are composed by Chaitanya Raja.

== Reception ==
Suhas Sistu of The Hans India wrote, "Despite minor pacing lapses, its emotional core, thoughtful twist, and sincere performances make it a meaningful and uplifting watch." rated that three star out of five

News18 wrote, "overall it remains an average journey."
