= Yeh Dil =

- Movie Poster
- Directed by: Teja
- Written by: Teja
- Based on: Nuvvu Nenu
- Produced by: Kiran
- Starring: Tusshar Kapoor; Anita Hassanandani
- Cinematography: Ravi Varman
- Edited by: Shankar
- Music by: Songs: Nadeem–Shravan; Score: R. P. Patnaik
- Production company: Anandi Art Creations
- Release date: 4 April 2003
- Running time: 147 minutes
- Country: India
- Language: Hindi

Yeh Dil (transl. This Heart) is a 2003 Indian Hindi-language romantic drama film written and directed by Teja, starring Tusshar Kapoor and Anita Hassanandani. The film was a remake of Teja's 2001 Telugu film Nuvvu Nenu. Anita Hassanandani reprised her role from the original version.

== Plot ==
Ravi Pratap Singh (Tusshar Kapoor) is a college student and the son of the wealthy businessman Raghuraj Pratap Singh (Akhilendra Mishra). His best friend, Kabir, always helps him. Ravi lives with his father, as his mother has died. Vasundhara Yadav (Anita Hassanandani) is the daughter of the middle-class wrestler Mithua Yadav (Vineet Kumar) and studies at the same college. She lives in a joint family with many of her relatives. Ravi excels in sports but performs poorly academically, while Vasu pays little attention to sports and focuses on her studies.

Ravi is neglected by Raghuraj, who is always focused on business and wealth. Raghuraj expects Ravi to excel academically so that he can send him to Harvard Business School. Similarly, Mithua, who had wanted a son, neglects Vasu and his wife (Chetana Das).

Ravi and Vasu begin studying together and gradually become friends before eventually falling in love, but Raghuraj disapproves of her because of her social status. Mithua sends some goons to the college, where they beat up Ravi. Raghuraj orders the police to retaliate, and Mithua is taken to the police station and beaten by the police. Vasu tells Ravi what has happened, after which he calls his father and threatens him.

Raghuraj arranges a "swayamvar" for his son, to which business tycoons and wealthy people send their daughters. Ravi invites Vasu and publicly proclaims his love for her. Mithua discovers that she has gone to Ravi's house and confronts Raghuraj, after which the police commissioner tells them that they should trick Ravi and Vasu into putting their relationship on hold until they complete their studies.

Following this agreement, Ravi is tricked into going to Mumbai, while Vasu is tricked into going to her uncle's house. Both escape: Ravi goes to Hyderabad, while Vasu goes to Mumbai. Ravi believes Vasu is in Hyderabad and goes to her house, only to be beaten up by goons. Vasu goes to Mumbai and is captured and taken to Ravi's house, where Raghuraj arranges for a killer to murder her. Both are saved, and they return to Hyderabad to get married with the help of Kabir and their college friends. Mithua eventually accepts the marriage and stops Vasu's aunt Chandi (Pratima Kazmi) from interfering. Raghuraj is also prevented from interfering. Ravi and Vasundhara marry, and the final scene shows Kabir and the entire college congratulating them.

== Cast ==
- Tusshar Kapoor as Ravi Pratap Singh
- Anita Hassanandani as Vasundhara Ravi Pratap Singh
- Supriya Karnik as Mrs. Chaudhary
- Banerjee as Pandit, the goon
- Pratima Kazmi as Chandi (Mithua's sister)
- Vineet Kumar as Mithua Yadav
- Akhilendra Mishra as Raghuraj Pratap Singh
- Chetana Das as Vasundhara's mother
- Mushtaq Khan as College Director Parvez
- Sharat Saxena as Police Commissioner Suraj
- Saurabh Shukla as Economics Teacher Vipin
- Achyut Potdar as Mansukh
- Anupam Shyam as Inspector Mahendra
- Sunila as Dance teacher Vinita

== Soundtrack ==
The songs were composed by Nadeem-Shravan, while the lyrics were written by Sameer. Two of the tunes (Gajuvaka Pilla and Priyathama) was retained here as "Jaaneman" and "Charminar Ke Laila".

#	Title	Singer(s)
1.	"Charminar Ki Laila"	Abhijeet
2.	"College Mein"	Sonu Nigam
3.	"Ek Mein Ek Tu"	Abhijeet, Nirja Pandit
4.	"Hey Kya Ladki"	Abhijeet, Kavita Krishnamurthy
5.	"Jaaneman O Jaaneman"	Tauseef Akhtar, Nirja Pandit
6.	"Kyun Dil Bichade"	Tauseef Akhtar
7.	"Telephone"	Abhijeet, Alka Yagnik
8.	"Tera Dilbar"	Sonu Nigam, Alka Yagnik
9.	"Tera Dilbar" (Sad)	Sonu Nigam, Alka Yagnik
10.	"Yeh Dil"	Nadeem Saifi
11.	"Yeh Dil" (Theme)	Tauseef Akhtar

== Box office ==
Yeh Dil performed poorly at the box office and was declared a "disaster" by Box Office India.
