= Gharshana =

2004 Telugu film by Gautam Menon

- Theatrical release poster
- Directed by: Gautham Vasudev Menon
- Written by: Kulasekhar (dialogues)
- Screenplay by: Gautham Vasudev Menon
- Story by: Gautham Vasudev Menon
- Based on: Kaakha Kaakha by Gautham Vasudev Menon
- Produced by: G. Sivaraju; C. Venkataraju
- Starring: Venkatesh; Asin
- Cinematography: R. D. Rajasekhar
- Edited by: Anthony
- Music by: Harris Jayaraj
- Production company: Geeta Chitra International
- Release date: 30 July 2004
- Running time: 159 minutes
- Country: India
- Language: Telugu

Gharshana (Note: Spelt as Gharshanaa on the CBFC certificate.) (transl. 'Friction' or 'Clash') is a 2004 Indian Telugu-language action thriller film produced by G. Sivaraju, C. Venkatraju, and Kalaipuli S. Thanu. It is directed by Gautham Vasudev Menon, in his Telugu debut. It is the remake of the Menon's own 2003 Tamil film Kaakha Kaakha. Venkatesh and Asin played the lead roles in the film, while the music was composed by Harris Jayaraj, who also composed for the original.

Despite receiving mostly mixed reviews from critics, the film completed a run of 50 days in 70 centers and became an moderate success at the box office.

== Plot ==
Ramachandra alias Ram, is an honest and daring IPS officer, with the Hyderabad City Police, as the Deputy Commissioner of Police (DCP), in the crime branch. As he has no family or relatives, he lives with no fear. Ram and his IPS friends, who include: Srikanth, Rajesh, and Jagan, are recruited into a special unit of police officers, to battle the organized crime in Hyderabad. Violent and laconic, Ram has little time and patience, for his personal life. The special unit is ruthless in its confrontation with criminals, going as far as assassinating gang members; the unit is finally disbanded after 5 encounters in 3 months, by human rights authorities; Ram is posted to Control Room Duties.

One day, a school teacher named, Maya, rebuffs Ram's routine questions regarding safety, not knowing that he is a police officer. He meets her again, when she and her friend are questioned for driving, without a license. However, Ram lets them off with a warning. When one of Maya's students has a problem with the local kids, who threatened to throw acid on her face, she asks Ram for help. He resolves this problem and a mutual respect grows between them. They begin seeing one another. When Maya gets into a road accident, Ram helps her recover, and they fall in love. Srikanth and his wife, Sandhya, become good friends with Maya.

Dass, a gangster, who escaped the encounter operations, meets his estranged brother Panda, who returns to Hyderabad after fourteen years of crime life, in Mumbai, Maharashtra. Panda has a peculiar tactic: he kills a family member of his opponent, but leaves the opponent alive to rot in failure and depression on the loss of his family member. Dass' gang, aided by Panda's planning, commit major kidnappings in the city and become very powerful in a period of six months.

The 11-year-old son of an influential movie producer is kidnapped and killed, and later his daughter is also kidnapped for ransom. The special unit is reassembled by the commissioner, with all four back in the crime branch. The unit tracks down and kill Dass in a railyard, as the others escape. Panda takes over the gang, promising grave revenge over his brother's death. Panda and his gang members target the families of the men in the special unit, but the police close in, and a badly injured Panda barely escapes Ram. Afterwards, Panda and his men brutally shoot and kill Jagan, the same night, and escape. The entire department is mobilised, and all family members of the remaining three in the unit, are sent into hiding.

Maya and Ram get married in a hurry and leave for Pulicherla, but the next day, Panda and his men enter the cottage that the couple is honeymooning in and shoot Ram into the Nagarjuna Sagar, leaving him for dead, and kidnapping Maya. Drowned and battling for life, Ram only thinks about rescuing Maya. Srikanth and Rajesh arrive at the cottage, discover Ram, and take him to the local hospital. Srikanth reveals that Sandhya was kidnapped earlier at the airport and confesses that it was he who gave away Ram's location to Panda and also emptied the magazine in his gun, for Sandhya's safe return.

Srikanth feels extreme remorse over what has happened. Whilst in the hospital, they receive a call from Panda, to meet him at Zaherabad, 100 kilometers away from Hyderabad, located on the National Highway 9. Ram, Srikanth, and Rajesh leave to meet him, along with Constable Ansari, driving them. When they go there, two packages are thrown to them from an oncoming train, one containing Sandhya's severed head and the other one containing Maya's arm flesh. Ram, along with everybody else, is extremely distraught, with Srikanth being hysterical upon seeing his wife's head. In agony of being responsible for the sudden turn of events, Srikanth shoots himself dead.

Ram and Rajesh track down Panda before he can escape from Andhra Pradesh. They engage in a shoot-out with the entire gang. Ram aims to shoot Panda, but Panda shoots Maya while using her as a shield, and she seemingly dies in Ram's arms after Panda escapes. An enraged Ram, tracks down Panda and the remaining members of his gang, to a dock. He brutally finishes them off, avenging Maya and his friends' deaths.

A few months later, Ram, after the death of his fellow squadmates and friends, still continues his job as an IPS officer. The ending scene features Ram calling out to Maya, who is shown to have survived Panda's attack.

== Cast ==
- Venkatesh as DCP Ram chandra "Ram" IPS
- Asin as Maya
- Salim Baig as Panda
- Ravi Prakash as Rajesh
- Daniel Balaji as Srikanth
- Vamsi Krishna as Jagan
- Yog Japee as Dass
- Satyam Rajesh as Constable Ansari, Ram's driver
- Minnale Ravi as Dass' henchman
- Kannan Ponnaiya as Dass' henchman
- Anand
- Chandana
- Amitha Rajan as Maya's sister
- Yana Gupta as item number in "Aadatanamaa"

== Production ==
Gharshana is a remake of Gautham Menon's Tamil film Kaakha Kaakha. N. T. Rama Rao Jr and Prabhas initially showed interest in acting in the lead role but Venkatesh was finalised instead. The film's muhurat puja was held on 19 January 2004 without Venkatesh as he was filming for Malliswari.

== Soundtrack ==
Gharshana

Soundtrack album by Harris Jayaraj
- Released: 16 June 2004
- Recorded: 2004
- Genre: Soundtrack
- Length: 30:12
- Label: Aditya Music
- Producer: Harris Jayaraj

Harris Jayaraj chronology
Kaakha Kaakha (2003)	Gharshana (2004)	Chellamae (2004)

The music was composed by Harris Jayaraj. The music was released by ADITYA Music Company. The soundtrack of Kaakha Kaakha was retained in the Telugu remake except for two songs: "Ye Chilipi" and "Andagaada". The audio launch took place in Hyderabad with Pawan Kalyan, Prabhas, Jyothika, K. Raghavendra Rao, B. Gopal, E. V. V. Satyanarayana, D. Suresh Babu, D. V. S. Raju, M. S. Raju, C. Aswini Dutt, and Ravi Babu in attendance.

In an audio review, Sreya Sunil of Idlebrain.com wrote, "Overall, Harris Jayaraj's music in this album is racy and infectiously catchy winning him applause once again after his last direct musical score in Telugu for Vasu".

All lyrics are written by Kulasekhar.

Track list
No.	Title	Singer(s)	Length
1.	"Cheliya Cheliya"	KK, Suchitra	5:19
2.	"Nanne Nanne"	Tippu, Pop Shalini	5:53
3.	"Andagaada"	Harini	5:20
4.	"Ye Chilipi"	Srinivas	5:14
5.	"Aadatanamaa"	Sunitha Sarathy, Febi Mani	4:48
6.	"The Encounter"		1:00
7.	"Theme Music" (Instrumental)		2:17
Total length:			30:12

== Reception ==
Jeevi of Idlebrain.com wrote: "The second half starts in an interesting style and it loses the steam as the climax approaches. The plus points of this film are music, Venkatesh, photography and stylish taking. The negative points are slow narration, lack of Telugu commercial elements, dry scenes and lack of substance. This film has got more style and less substance". A critic from Sify wrote: "Speed, style and sparkle are the essence of Gharshanaa".
