= Coffee with a Killer =

2025 Indian Telugu-language film by R. P. Patnaik

- Release poster
- Directed by: R. P. Patnaik
- Written by: R. P. Patnaik
- Produced by: Sevenhills Satish
- Starring: Temper Vamsi; Ravi Prakash; Siva Karthik; Srinivasa Reddy; Ravi Babu; Satyam Rajesh
- Cinematography: Anush Gorak
- Edited by: Anush Gorak
- Music by: Bharath Madhusudhanan
- Production company: Sevenhills Productions
- Distributed by: Aha
- Release date: 31 January 2025
- Running time: 104 minutes
- Country: India
- Language: Telugu

Coffee with a Killer is a 2025 Indian Telugu-language comedy thriller film written and directed by R. P. Patnaik. The film features Temper Vamsi, Ravi Prakash, Siva Karthi, Srinivasa Reddy, Ravi Babu, Satyam Rajesh and others in important roles.

The film was released on 31 January 2025 on Aha.

== Plot ==
A professional killer, was hired to kill his target in a busy coffee shop. But the same coffee shop if filled with different people, with different stories. How will the killer fulfill his task is the story.

== Cast ==
- Temper Vamsi as killer
- Ravi Prakash as Jagadeesh
- Siva Karthik
- Srinivasa Reddy as Pothana
- Ravi Babu
- Satyam Rajesh
- Gemini Suresh as Suresh
- Ramprasad as Anand
- Mounika Chowdary
- Banerjee
- Arjun Krishna as Giri
- Avanthika
- Thagubothu Ramesh
- Sai
- Krishna Reddy
- Fish Venkat
- Anil Kumar
- Sree Rapaka as Komali
- Ambati Srinivas
- Surya
- Raghu Babu in a guest appearance
- Sri Sudha Bhimireddy as Mahi
- NPR as Vikram

== Release and reception ==
Coffee with a Killer was originally scheduled for a theatrical release but had a direct-to-video release on Aha on 31 January 2025.

Avad Mohammad of OTTPlay gave a rating of 2.5 out of 5 and wrote that, "Coffee with a Killer is a suspense drama that has a great premise but the narration is made silly by adding silly tracks".
