= Tulasi Dalam (film) =

- poster
- Directed by: R. P. Patnaik
- Written by: R. P. Patnaik; Tirumal Nag (dialogues)
- Produced by: R. P. Patnaik
- Starring: Nishchal; Vandana Gupta; R. P. Patnaik
- Cinematography: Sarath Mandava
- Edited by: S. B. Uddhav
- Music by: R. P. Patnaik
- Release date: 11 March 2016
- Running time: 118 min
- Country: India
- Language: Telugu

Tulasi Dalam is a 2016 Indian Telugu horror thriller film directed and produced by R. P. Patnaik. The film features Nishchal and Vandana Gupta in the lead roles and R. P. Patnaik in a supporting role. The film was released worldwide on 11 March 2016.

== Plot ==
Satvik (Nishchal Deva) who is an orphan moving to Las Vegas to be with his girlfriend, Nisha (Vandana Guptra). He stays in an apartment with a roommate, Subbu (Suneel Boddepalli). Satvik is a staunch non-believer in ghosts, and keeps rubbishing other’s beliefs too. During a heated argument, Subbu challenges Satvik to spend a night in the nearby cemetery, all by himself. Satvik accepts this challenge, and succeeds too. But that’s when the actual trouble starts. Satvik starts experiencing paranormal activities ever since he returns from the graveyard. He starts to notice the spirit of a young girl, Shanti, following him around. Giving up, he finally approaches Dr. Tilak (R. P. Patnaik) who is researching on paranormal activities. Dr. Tilak helps them solve their problems. Who exactly is Shanti? Why is she following Satvik? How does Dr. Tilak help in bringing about peace forms the rest.

== Cast ==
- Nischal as Satvik
- Vandana Gupta as Nisha
- R. P. Patnaik as Dr. Tilak
- Brahmanandam as a witch doctor
- Duvvasi Mohan
- Suneel Boddepalli as Subbu
- Anitha Chowdary
- Radha Rayasam
- Deepak Ravella
- Shriyan Vemuri as Baby Nischal
- Shaivy Vemuri as Kid Nischal

== Production ==
The film marks the debut of R. P. Patnaik as a producer. Nischal Deva plays a software engineer while Vandana Gupta plays a tour guide. The film was shot for 44 days in Las Vegas.

== Release and reception ==
Tulasi Dalam was released on 11 March 2016 to negative response from critics.

Y. Sunitha Chowdary of The Hindu found out was the movie was absurd and had an underdeveloped plot.
