= Lakshmi Kalyanam (2007 film) =

- Movie Poster
- Directed by: Teja
- Written by: Paruchuri brothers (dialogues)
- Screenplay by: Teja
- Story by: Teja
- Produced by: K. Mahendra
- Starring: Kalyan Ram; Kajal Aggarwal
- Cinematography: A.R. Krishna
- Edited by: Shankar
- Music by: R. P. Patnaik
- Release date: 15 February 2007
- Country: India
- Language: Telugu

Lakshmi Kalyanam is a 2007 Indian Telugu-language romantic action film directed by Teja, who also wrote the screenplay. Kalyan Ram and Kajal Aggarwal played the lead roles. The film was released on 15 February 2007 and was declared average at the box office. It was dubbed into Hindi as Meri Saugandh (2011) and into Tamil as Machakaalai. The film was Kajal's Telugu cinema debut.

== Plot ==
Two feuding villages form the backdrop of the story, with Ramu (Kalyan Ram) and Lakshmi (Kaajal) belonging to one village and the villain Giridhar (Ajay) to another. Lakshmi and Ramu are cousins who grow up to love each other, which is not appreciated by Lakshmi's father, who is also the village head.

Meanwhile, Giridhar's evil eye falls upon Lakshmi when he chances upon her in college. He writes on her back in blood that he would marry her. This enrages Ramu, who confronts Giridhar, only to be taunted to prove his love towards Lakshmi by opening the doors of the temple, which is the bone of contention between the two villages.

== Cast ==
- Kalyan Ram as Ramu
- Kajal Aggarwal as Lakshmi (Voice dubbed by Raasi)
- Ajay as Giridhar
- Sayaji Shinde as Chenchuramayya
- Suhasini as Parijatham
- Avinash as Chalamayya
- Srinivasa Reddy as Gopalam
- Nagineedu as District Collector
- Prabha
- Subhashini
- Telangana Shakuntala
- Pavala Syamala
- Raghu Babu
- Duvvasi Mohan
- Kondavalasa Lakshmana Rao
- Rallapalli
- Narra Venkateswara Rao
- J. V. Ramana Murthi
- Chittajalu Lakshmipati

== Music ==
Lakshmi Kalyanam

Soundtrack album to Lakshmi Kalyanam by R. P. Patnaik
- Released: 26 January 2007
- Recorded: 2007
- Genre: Feature film soundtrack
- Length: 30:07
- Language: Telugu
- Label: Madhura Entertainment
- Producer: R. P. Patnaik

Audio of Lakshmi Kalyanam was released on 26 January 2007 at Big 92.7 FM radio station in Hyderabad. Big FM station director Ashwin launched the audio and gave the first unit to music director RP Patnaik. The audio launch function was also attended by Swapna (programming director of BIG FM), Jeethi (producer), Nihal, Pranathi and Malavika. Madhura Entertainment bought the audio rights.

Track listing
No.	Title	Lyrics	Artist(s)	Length
1.	"Avva Avva"	Chinni Charan	Karthik, Malavika	04:39
2.	"Bava Bava"	Ramajogayya Sastry	Shankar Mahadevan, Sujatha Mohan	04:38
3.	"Aligava"	Ramajogayya Sastry	Nihal, Pranavi	04:06
4.	"Chinni Chintakaya"	Ramajogayya Sastry	Master Rohith	04:24
5.	"Gunde Gontulo"	Ramajogayya Sastry	K.K.	04:38
6.	"Labjanaka"	Ramajogayya Sastry	R. P. Patnaik, Ravi Varma, Raghu Babu, Harsha, Kondavalasa, Duvvasi, Geetha Madhuri	04:58
7.	"Rathi Gunde"	Ramajogayya Sastry	Vandemataram Srinivas	02:44
Total length:				30:07

== Reception ==
Jeevi of Idlebrain.com opined that "Kalyan Ram and Ajay are revelations in this film". A critic from Sify gave the film a verdict of "Run-of-the-mill" and wrote that "To cut a long story short, Lakshmi Kalyanam is regular commercial film". A critic from Full Hyderabad said that "Lakshmi Kalyanam is not a must-watch".
