= Broker (2010 film) =

2010 Indian film by R.P. Patnaik

- Theatrical release poster
- Directed by: R. P. Patnaik
- Produced by: Maddineni Ramesh; Maddineni chidvilas
- Starring: R. P. Patnaik; Asha Saini; Kota Srinivasa Rao
- Cinematography: Sarath Mandava
- Edited by: S. B. Uddhav
- Music by: R. P. Patnaik
- Release date: 31 December 2010
- Running time: 126 minutes
- Country: India
- Language: Telugu

Broker is a 2010 Indian Telugu-language political thriller film written, directed and featuring music composed by R. P. Patnaik who also portrays the lead role in the film. The Kannada film Agraja (2014) was loosely inspired from this film. A sequel titled Broker 2 was released in 2014.

== Plot ==
Ganapati alias Gani is a mediator who has a lot of contacts with politicians and government officers. Several people approach him and offer bribe to the officials to get their things done quickly. He is the right hand of a big politician in dealing with land encroachments. He also saves a corrupt officer Dharmateja when ACB officials rides his house and got suspended. Many people suffer due to this. Once he helps his old teacher to receive his retirement benefits in exchange for a bribe. Being principled, he kills himself when he learns of it. Gani also loses his son in a fly-over collapse incident. Gani helped the contractor in getting the project from officials through bribes. His wife hates him because of his lobbying job. But he continues.

He meets Dharmateja and knows about his charity work. He explains to him why he is a changed man now. Gani feels guilty for all his past actions, and goes to a TV studio to reveal all the connections he had with corrupt officials and the amount of money they had taken as bribes. He reveals a couple of connections which shocks everybody. Then he refuses to reveal all the names, requesting those corrupt officials reveal themselves. Many calls from throughout the state inundate the TV station. The Chief minister declares that there would no cases against those who voluntarily surrendered their illegal money and it would be utilized for the people.

== Cast ==
- R. P. Patnaik as Ganapathi
- Asha Saini as Ganapathi's wife
- Kota Srinivasa Rao as Corrupt politician
- Gollapudi Maruti Rao as a retired school teacher
- Srihari as Dharma Teja
- M. V. S. Haranatha Rao as Chief Minister
- Y. Kasi Viswanath as a corrupt officer
- Suresh as Surya Prakash, TV9 journalist
- Banerjee as CBI Officer
- Veda Sastry as Harini, TV9 Reporter
- Surekha Vani as Surekha, Dharma Teja's wife
- Chalapathi Rao as Flyover Builder
- Keerthi Chawla as Film actress Urvasi (guest appearance)
- Shankar Melkote
- Dharmavarapu Subramanyam as a man who sells plots on the moon
- Bharath Reddy as Inspector Surya, Harini's fiancé
- Giri

== Production ==
Srihari signed the film to fulfill a promise after R. P. Patnaik sang in one of his films. He plays a broker.

== Soundtrack ==
The album consists of five songs composed by R. P. Patnaik.

| No. | Title | Singer(s) | Length |
|---|---|---|---|
| 1. | "Kukka Thoka Vankara" | Simha |
| 2. | "Atu Vangapadu" | Varikuppala Yadagiri, Geetha Madhuri |
| 3. | "Purudu Posthe Lancham" | Priya Subrahmanyam |
| 4. | "Sare Jahase Acha" | Sreerama Chandra |
| 5. | "Bolo Jai Jai Jai Ganapathi" | Hemachandra |

== Release and reception ==
The film was scheduled to release on11 December 2010 but was delayed to 31 December.

A critic from SuperGoodMovies.com rated the film 2.5/5 and wrote, "Broker is a fine film and works partly for the people who likes to watch serious cinema. On the commercial front it has very less chances to survive but will bag a couple of awards for the honesty factor".

== Awards ==
- Nandi Award for Best Story Writer – R. P. Patnaik
