= Dasaradh (director) =

Indian film director

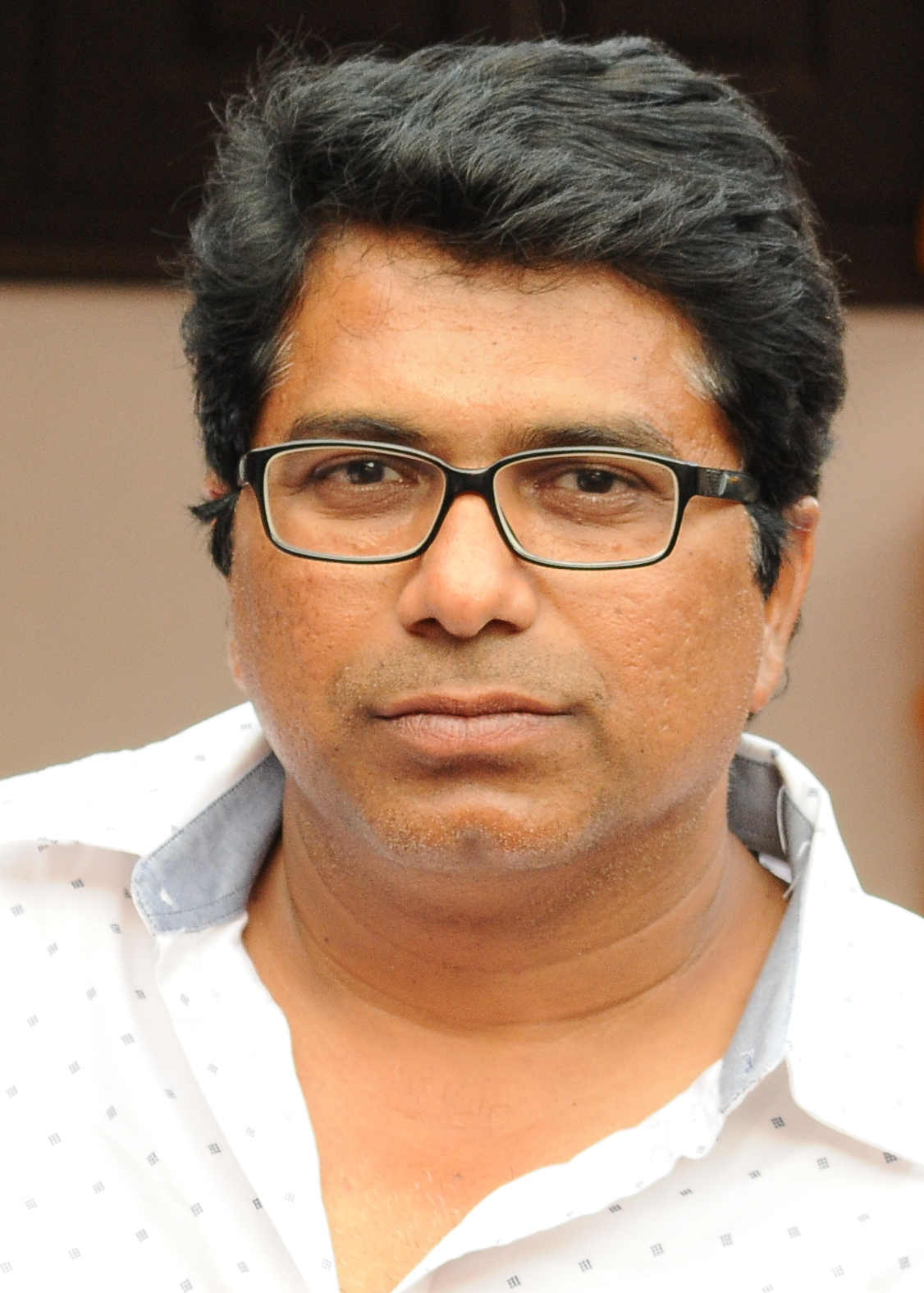
- Born: Kondapalli Dasaradh Kumar; 5 June 1971 (age 55); Khammam, Andhra Pradesh, India (present-day Telangana)
- Occupations: Director, screenwriter
- Years active: 2001–present
- Spouse: Sesha Soumya (m. 2005)
- Children: 2

Kondapalli Dasaradh Kumar (born 5 June 1971) is an Indian film director and screenwriter who works in Telugu cinema. He is best known for directing the films Santosham (2002), Mr. Perfect (2011), and Greeku Veerudu (2013).

== Personal life ==
Dasaradh was born on 5 June 1971 to a Telugu Brahmin family in Khammam, Andhra Pradesh (present-day Telangana). He married Sesha Sowmya in 2005, and the couple has two daughters.

== Career ==
Before entering the film industry, Dasaradh worked in television, contributing as a screenplay and dialogue writer for four soap operas in collaboration with noted author Yandamuri Veerendranath. One of these series, Vennello Aada Pilla, aired on Doordarshan Andhra Pradesh and was a commercial success.

Dasaradh later transitioned to films, working as an associate director on several projects, including Hello I Love You (Veera Shankar), Harischandra (Tulasi Kumar), Yuvaraju (Y. V. S. Chowdary), Chitram, Nuvvu Nenu, and Family Circus (Teja), and Subhavela (B. V. Ramana).

== Filmography ==
=== As director ===
Year	Title	Notes
2002	Santosham	
2003	Sambaram	
2005	Sri	
2008	Swagatam	
2011	Mr. Perfect	
2013	Greeku Veerudu	
2016	Shourya	

=== As writer ===
Year	Title	Credited as	Notes
Year	Title	Writer	Notes
2001	Nuvvu Nenu	Yes	
2026	Ustaad Bhagat Singh	Screenplay	

=== As actor ===
Year	Title	Credited as
2026	Papam Prathap	Dr K.Dasaradh

== Awards ==
Nandi Awards

- Nandi Award for Best Feature Film, Bronze - Santosham - 2002
- Filmfare Award for Best Film – Telugu - Santosham - 2002

Other awards

- Southern India Cinematographers Association Award - 2002
