= Duvvasi Mohan =

Indian comedian, actor and film producer

- Born: Jagityala, Telangana, India
- Spouse: D. Sandhya Rani
- Children: 1

Duvvasi Mohan Kumar is an Indian actor who is known for acting in comic roles, primarily in Telugu films. He is from Jagtial. He entered Telugu cinema as a producer, but later turned to acting and appeared in comedy roles in over 350 films. He turned lead actor for Kurkure (2008).

== Partial filmography ==
| Year | Title | Role | Note |
|---|---|---|---|
| 1996 | College Student | | |
| 1996 | Nalla Pussalu | | |
| 1997 | Korukunna Priyudu | | |
| 1997 | Ayyinda Leda | Guravayya | |
| 1997 | Bobbili Dora | | |
| 1997 | Nayanamma | | |
| 1997 | Circus Sattipandu | | |
| 1997 | Vammo Vatto O Pellaamo | | |
| 1997 | Priyamaina Srivaru | | |
| 1997 | Thoka Leni Pitta | | |
| 1997 | Priya O Priya | | |
| 1998 | Prathista | James Bonda | |
| 1998 | Mee Aayana Jagratha | | |
| 1998 | Life To Wife | | |
| 1999 | Samarasimha Reddy | | |
| 1999 | Veedu Samanyudu Kadhu | | |
| 1999 | Yamajathakudu | | |
| 1999 | Neti Gandhi | | |
| 1999 | Pichodi Chetilo Raayi | | |
| 1999 | Maa Balaji | | |
| 2000 | College | | |
| 2000 | Bachelors | | |
| 2001 | Chiranjeevulu | | |
| 2001 | Snehithuda | | |
| 2002 | Vasu | | |
| 2002 | Jayam | | |
| 2003 | Sambaram | | |
| 2003 | Okariki Okaru | | |
| 2004 | Lakshmi Narasimha | | |
| 2004 | Premante Maade | | |
| 2004 | Naa Autograph | | |
| 2004 | Shankar Dada M.B.B.S. | | |
| 2004 | Swamy | | |
| 2004 | Tapana | | |
| 2004 | Jai | | |
| 2004 | Ammayi Bagundi | | |
| 2004 | Sakhiya | | |
| 2005 | Dhairyam | | |
| 2005 | Avunanna Kaadanna | | |
| 2006 | Rakhee | | |
| 2006 | Maayajaalam | | |
| 2006 | Samanyudu | | |
| 2006 | Oka V Chitram | | |
| 2006 | Tata Birla Madhyalo Laila | | |
| 2007 | Athili Sattibabu LKG | | |
| 2007 | Gundamma Gaari Manavadu | | |
| 2007 | Allare Allari | | |
| 2007 | Lakshmi Kalyanam | | |
| 2008 | Somberi | | |
| 2008 | Keka | | |
| 2008 | Kurkure | | |
| 2008 | Kuberulu | | |
| 2009 | Lakshmi Putrudu | | |
| 2009 | Kick | | |
| 2009 | Pistha | | |
| 2009 | Snehituda | | |
| 2010 | Seeta Ramula Kalyanam | | |
| 2010 | Srimathi Kalyanam | | |
| 2010 | Saradaga Kasepu | | |
| 2010 | Kathi Kantha Rao | | |
| 2010 | Collector Gari Bharya | | |
| 2010 | Yemaindi Ee Vela | | |
| 2011 | Oosaravelli | | |
| 2012 | All The Best | | |
| 2013 | Athadu Aame O Scooter | | |
| 2013 | Gunde Jaari Gallanthayyinde | | |
| 2014 | Yuddham | | |
| 2014 | Race Gurram | | |
| 2014 | Jump Jilani | | |
| 2014 | Pilla Nuvvu Leni Jeevitam | | |
| 2014 | Paisa | | |
| 2014 | Pyar Mein Padipoyane | | |
| 2015 | Bengal Tiger | | |
| 2016 | Tulasi Dalam | | |
| 2016 | Manalo Okkadu | | |
| 2017 | Tamasha | | |
| 2017 | Radha | | |
| 2017 | Nakshatram | | |
| 2018 | Geetha Govindam | | |
| 2019 | Saaho | | |
| 2019 | Nuvvu Thopu Raa | | |
| 2019 | Sita | | |
| 2019 | 90ML | | |
| 2019 | F2: Fun and Frustration | | |
| 2021 | Alludu Adhurs | | |
| 2021 | Ek Mini Katha | | |
| 2021 | Maestro | | |
| 2022 | Induvadana | | |
| 2022 | F3 | | |
| 2022 | Gangster Gangaraju | | |
| 2022 | Like, Share & Subscribe | | |
| 2022 | Macherla Niyojakavargam | | |
| 2023 | Veera Simha Reddy | | |
| 2023 | Das Ka Dhamki | | |
| 2023 | Slum Dog Husband | | |
| 2023 | Skanda | | |
| 2024 | Dhoom Dhaam | Dastagiri | |
| 2025 | Uppu Kappurambu | Malli Babai | |
| 2025 | Meghalu Cheppina Prema Katha | Yoga teacher | |
| 2025 | Constable | | |
| 2025 | Happy Journey | | |
| 2026 | The Paradise | Paradise Resident | |
