= Banerjee (actor) =

Telugu actor

- Born: Maganti Venu Banerjee; Vijayawada, Andhra Pradesh, India
- Occupation: Actor
- Years active: 1980–present
- Spouse: M. Sailaja

Banerjee (born Maganti Venu Banerjee) is an Indian actor who primarily works in Telugu films. He is the son of character actor Maganti Raghavaiah. Banerjee started his career as an assistant director. His career in films spans over 40 years.

== Early life ==
He was born in Governorpeta Locality of Vijayawada, Andhra Pradesh, India. He studied in Montessori children's school headed by Vege Koteswaramma. His father, actor Maganti Raghavaiah, was an official in Information and broadcasting ministry. As he was transferred to Delhi, he lived there for some time. He completed his intermediate education from A.C College in Guntur. He completed his Hotel management course in Chennai, where he also completed his B.A. Later he worked as a branch manager in a company in Vizianagaram.

== Career ==
He first started working in films with U. Visweswara Rao.

== Filmography ==
=== Telugu ===
- Harischandrudu (1982)
- Nyayam Meere Cheppali (1985)
- Aalaapana (1985)
- Vande Mataram (1985)
- Surya Chandra (1985)
- Terror (1985) as Banerjee
- Vivaha Bandham (1986)
- Shanthi Nivasam (1986)
- Brahma Rudrulu (1986)
- Nalla Trachu (1987)
- Prithviraj (1988) as Banerjee
- Jaitra Yatra (1991)
- Parishkaram (1991)
- Killer (1992)
- Rakshana (1993)
- Gaayam (1993)
- One by Two (1993)
- Theerpu (1994)
- Money Money (1994)
- Gulabi (1995)
- Tapassu (1995)
- Little Soldiers (1996)
- Deyyam (1996)
- Ninne Pelladata (1996)
- Bombay Priyudu (1996)
- Preminchukundam Raa (1997)
- Priyaragalu (1997)
- Suryavamsam (1998)
- Pape Naa Pranam (1998)
- Ganesh (1998)
- Sri Sitaramula Kalyanam Chootamu Raarandi (1998)
- Gamyam (1998) as Inspector Prasad
- Sambayya (1999)
- Seetharama Raju (1999)
- Nee Kosam (1999)
- Chitram (2000)
- Azad (2000)
- Jayam Manadera (2000)
- Avunu Valliddaru Ista Paddaru! (2001)
- Nuvvu Nenu (2001)
- Chirujallu (2001)
- Adhipati (2001)
- Anandam (2001)
- Subbu (2001)
- Naga Pratista (2002)
- Friends (2002)
- Holi (2002)
- Santosham (2002)
- Hai (2002)
- Dhanalakshmi, I Love You (2002)
- Ee Abbai Chala Manchodu (2003)
- Juniors (2003)
- Ottesi Cheputunna (2003)
- Appudappudu (2003)
- Oka Raju Oka Rani (2003)
- Sambaram (2003)
- Anaganaga O Kurraadu (2003)
- Sivamani (2003)
- Nenu Pelliki Ready (2003)
- Pranam (2003)
- Gangotri (2003)
- Villain (2003)
- Andhrawala (2004)
- Malliswari (2004)
- Nenu (2004)
- Andaru Dongale Dorikite (2004)
- Satta (2004)
- Adavi Ramudu (2004)
- Swamy (2004)
- Gowri (2004)
- Shankar Dada MBBS (2004)
- Apparao Driving School (2004)
- Chanti (2004)
- Sakhiya (2004)
- Allari Pidugu (2005)
- Orey Pandu (2005)
- Nireekshana (2005)
- Nayakudu (2005)
- Sri (2005)
- Maa Iddari Madhya (2005)
- Samanyudu (2006)
- Swagatam (2008)
- Andamaina Manasulo (2008)
- John Apparao 40 Plus (2008)
- Bommana Brothers Chandana Sisters (2008)
- Konchem Kothaga (2008)
- Three (2008)
- Gorintaku (2008)
- Kick (2009)
- Sankham (2009)
- Samardhudu (2009)
- Jayeebhava (2009)
- Saleem (2009)
- Maa Nanna Chiranjeevi (2010)
- Bindaas (2010)
- Rama Rama Krishna Krishna (2010)
- Panchakshari (2010)
- Pappu (2010)
- Don Seenu (2010)
- Ragada (2010)
- Broker (2010)
- Wanted (2011)
- Vastadu Naa Raju (2011)
- Mr. Perfect (2011)
- Oosaravelli (2011)
- Mirchi (2013)
- Backbench Student (2013)
- Jai Sriram (2013; uncredited)
- 1 (2014)
- Jump Jilani (2014)
- Drushyam (2014)
- Intelligent Idiots (2015)
- James Bond (2015)
- Hitudu (2015)
- Columbus (2015)
- Eedu Gold Ehe (2016)
- Janatha Garage (2016)
- Mister (2017)
- Rarandoi Veduka Chudham (2017)
- Samanthakamani (2017)
- Raja the Great (2017)
- Rangasthalam (2018)
- Tenali Ramakrishna BA. BL (2018)
- Tej I Love You (2018)
- Bharat Ane Nenu (2018)
- Raktham – The Blood (2019)
- Thipparaa Meesam (2019)
- IIT Krishnamurthy (2020)
- Poratam (2020)
- Deyyam (2021)
- Khiladi (2022)
- Acharya (2022)
- Aadavallu Meeku Johaarlu (2022)
- Like, Share & Subscribe (2022)
- Top Gear (2022)
- Katha Venuka Katha (2023)
- Viswam (2024)
- Dhoom Dhaam (2024)
- Coffee with a Killer (2025)
- Kothapallilo Okappudu (2025)
- Karmanye Vadhikaraste (2025)
- Sing Geetham (2026)

=== Tamil ===
- Naan Sigappu Manithan (1985)
- Kanne Kaniyamuthe (1986)
- Vikram (1986)
- Enga Veetu Deivam (1989)
- Annaatthe (2021)

=== Other languages ===
- Satya (1998) (Hindi)
- Yeh Dil (2003) (Hindi)
- Dandupalya 4 (2019) (Kannada)

=== Television ===
- 9 Hours (Disney+Hotstar) (2022)
