= R. P. Patnaik =

Indian singer and composer

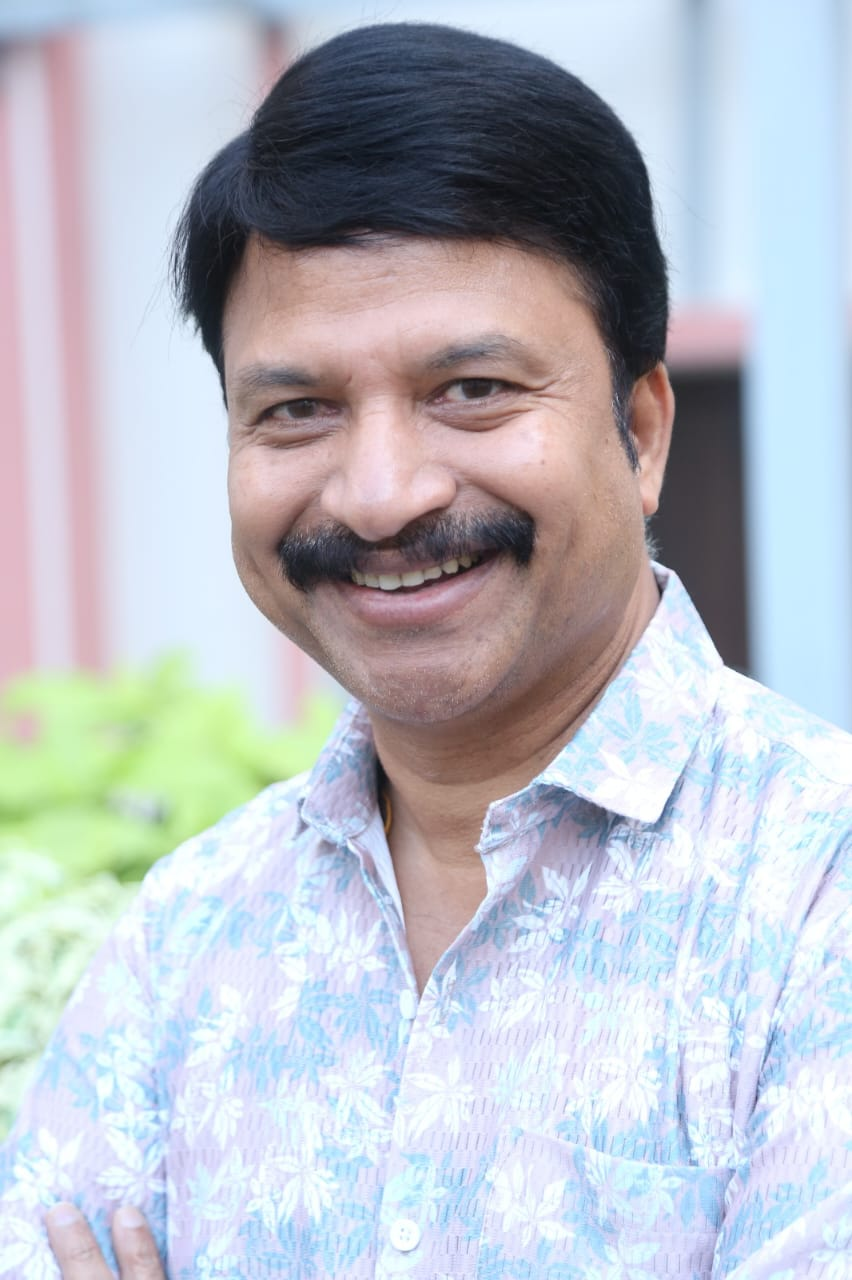
- R. P. Patnaik in 2025

Background information
- Born: 10 March 1970 (age 56)
- Occupations: Singer; Music Composer; Writer; Music director; Director
- Years active: 1999–present

Ravindra Prasad Patnaik is an Indian music composer, singer, actor, screenwriter and film director who works in Telugu, Kannada and Tamil language films. He won three Filmfare Awards and three Nandi Awards. He has toured the world to perform his live shows.

Patnaik had entered the film industry with a desire to become a film director, and began first as a music director with the movie Nee Kosam. Cinematographer-turned-director Teja gave him a break with Chitram, that Patnaik made his directorial debut with the 2008 film Andamaina Manasulo. As of March 2016, he finished his sixth Telugu language film Manalo Okkadu. His brother Gautam Patnaik is a director who made his directorial debut with Keratam (2011).

== Career ==
Patnaik received the Filmfare Award three times consecutively for the films Nuvvu Nenu, Santosham and Excuse Me, and apart from receiving the Andhra Pradesh state Nandi Award for the film Nuvvu Nenu in 2001, he has won awards from different cultural organisations in and outside the state and country for his music. His film Mnalo Okadu received Third Best Feature Film award for 2016 Nandi Awards.

As a singer, apart from singing in his own composition, he has sung for almost all the lead composers including Ilayaraja and has sung about 300 songs.

He composed an international album, first of its kind in the world, on time signatures called Chaakra the Signature of Time which he applied for Grammy Awards.

He has introduced many singers including Ranjith, Mallikarjun, Ravivarma, Nihal, and Kousalya.

Patnaik had done his Bachelors of science in Rayagada Autonomous College, Rayagada, Odisha. He has a post graduate degree in space physics from Andhra University.

=== Actor ===
Apart from music, he made his acting debut in the 2004 Telugu film named Seenu Vasanthi Lakshmi in which he played a blind singer and got a very good response for his outstanding performance. In 2010 he acted in Broker.

Patnaik's first directed film was the experimental short 22 minutes, in which the entire 22-minute film is a single scene and edge-of-the-seat screenplay. The experiment is the characters which are seen don't speak and the characters which are heard not seen.

He acted, produced, directed, composed music for the 2016 film Tulasi Dalam. In 2016 after getting huge positive response from the public for his Directorial movie Broker on Corruption, He dared to question media's Ego and its ignorance in collecting their News with his movie Manalo Okadu.

=== Director ===
Following upon his work as a music composer and music director, Patnaik began directing films, and has directed 6 feature films till date. In 2008, he directed his first film, Andamaina Manasulo, a musical love story of a 13-year-old girl falling in love with a 21-year boy and with a message on how should be an ideal orphanage. His second released film in December 2010 was Broker, about political brokers, the film was shortlisted for final race in the National Awards. Both these released films had him receive two Nandi awards for Best Story Writer for the years 2008 and 2010.

In 2012, he directed a film, titled Friends Book in Telugu, about the strength of social network.

In 2013, he directed a supernatural thriller film in 2013 titled Amy. The film is set in a different backdrop in the USA about Amish community.

In 2016, he produced and directed a film named Tulasi Dalam, for which he composed 5 songs and has also acted.

In 2016, he directed and acted in movie Manalo Okkadu.

== Filmography ==
=== Film director ===
- Andamaina Manasulo (2008)
- Broker (2010)
- Friends Book (2012)
- Amy (2013)
- Tulasi Dalam (2016)
- Manalo Okkadu (2016)
- Coffee with a Killer (2025)

=== Actor ===
Year	Title	Role	Notes
2004	Seenu Vasanthi Lakshmi	Seenu	
2008	Andamaina Manasulo	Doctor	
2010	Broker	Ganapathi	
2016	Tulasi Dalam	Dr. Tilak	
2016	Manalo Okkadu	Krishnamurthy	

== Discography ==
=== Music director ===
==== Telugu ====
- Nee Kosam (1999)
- Chitram (2000)
- Subhavela (2000)
- Family Circus (2001)
- Ramma Chilakamma (2001)
- Nuvvu Nenu (2001)
- 9 Nelalu (2001)
- Manasantha Nuvve (2001)
- Nuvvu Leka Nenu Lenu (2002)
- Santosham (2002)
- Sreeram (2002)
- Allari Ramudu (2002)
- Indra (2002) [one song only]
- Jayam (2002)
- Holi (2002)
- Gemini (2002)
- Nee Sneham (2002)
- Eeshwar (2002)
- Yuva Rathna (2002) [one song only]
- Dil (2003)
- Sambaram (2003)
- Nijam (2003)
- Ninne Ishtapaddanu (2003)
- Neeku Nenu Naaku Nuvvu (2003)
- Appudappudu (2003)
- Aa Naluguru (2004)
- Seenu Vasanthi Lakshmi (2004)
- Avunanna Kaadanna (2005)
- Maa Iddari Madhya (2006)
- Bommalata (2006)
- Lakshmi Kalyanam (2007)
- Swagatam (2008)
- Naa Manasukemaindi (2008)
- Swagatam (2008)
- Andamaina Manasulo (2008)
- Vaade Kavali (2009)
- Nenu Tanu Aame (2010)
- Broker (2010)
- Virodhi (2011)
- Friends Book (2012)
- Prabhanjanam (2014)
- Tulasi Dalam (2016)
- Manalo Okkadu (2016)
- Ahimsa (2023)
- Honeymoon Express (2024); Only background score
- Itlu Mee Yedava (2025)

==== Kannada ====
- Excuse Me (2003)
- Chappale (2004)
- Jootata (2005)
- Inspector Dayanayak (2005)
- Aakash (2005)
- Siddu (2005)
- Honeymoon Express (2006)
- Student (2006)
- Dattha (2006)
- Uppi Dada M.B.B.S. (2006)
- Odahuttidavalu (2006)
- Tenali Rama (2006)
- Ee Preethi Yeke Bhoomi Melide (2006)
- Vidyarthi (2007)
- Thamashegagi (2007)
- Savi Savi Nenapu (2007)
- Police Story 2 (2007)
- Ugadi (2007)
- Kshana Kshana (2007)
- Vamshi (2008)
- Gharga (2026); Only one song

==== Tamil ====
- Jayam (2003)
- Pazhaniappa Kalloori (2007)
- Naan Aval Adhu (Unreleased film)

==== Hindi ====
- Yeh Dil (2002) (Background score only)

=== Singer ===
Year	Song(s)	Film	Composer	Language	Notes
2000	"Anaganaga", "Kukka Kavali"	Chitram	himself	Telugu	
2001	"Nanna Kattukaro", "Neelam Neelam", "Jim Jatara"	Family Circus	himself	Telugu	
2001	"Sammalori Killa"	Ramma Chilakamma	himself	Telugu	
2002	"Premanthe Telusa"	Premante	Sashi Preetham	Telugu	
2002	"Chamak Cham"	Ninu Choodaka Nenundalenu	Ilayaraaja	Telugu	
2002	"Hai Re Hai"	Hai	Koti	Telugu	
2002	"Gaajuvaka Pilla"	Nuvvu Nenu	himself	Telugu	
2002	"Cheppave Prema", "Nee Sneham"	Manasantha Nuvve	himself	Telugu	
2002	"Nindu Godari", "Nuvvante Nakkishtam"	Nuvvu Leka Nenu Lenu	himself	Telugu	
2002	"Bulli Bulli", "Maamare", "Pedavullo"	Sreeram	himself	Telugu	
2002	"Priyathama", "Veeri", "Bandi", "Raanu Raanu", "Gorantha Deepam", "Enduko"	Jayam	himself	Telugu	
2002	"Oppulakuppa", "Cheliya", "Jadaku Jada"	Allari Ramudu	himself	Telugu	
2002	"Ounani", "Nee manasu", "Chintamani"	Holi	himself	Telugu	
2002	"Bandhame"	Gemeni	himself	Telugu	
2002	"Veyi Kannulatho", "Konthakalam"	Nee Sneham	himself	Telugu	
2002	"Ameerpet", "Olammo"	Eeshwar	himself	Telugu	
2003	"Kavithaiye Theriyuma", "Vetri Velada"	Jayam	himself	Tamil	
2003	"Excuse Me", "Preethi Yeke"	Excuse Me	himself	Kannada	
2004	"Chirugaali Veechene"	Sivaputrudu (D)	Ilayaraaja	Telugu	
2004	"Bachiko Nannali", "Ninneya Nenapendigu"	Chappale	himself	Kannada	
2005	"O Sona"	Jootata	himself	Kannada	
2007	"Wine Shopla"	Pazhaniappa Kalloori	himself	Tamil	

== Awards and nominations ==
Filmfare Awards South

- 2001, Best Music Director – Telugu - Nuvvu Nenu
- 2002, Best Music Director – Telugu - Santosham
- 2003, Best Music Director – Kannada - Excuse Me

Nandi Awards

- 2001, Best Music Director - Nuvvu Nenu
- 2008, Best Story Writer - Andamaina Manasulo
- 2010, Best Story Writer - Broker
- 2016, Nandi Award for Best Third Feature film - Manalo Okkadu
