= Nuvvu Nenu =

2001 Telugu film directed by Teja

- Poster
- Directed by: Teja
- Written by: Teja; Dasarath
- Produced by: P. Kiran
- Starring: Uday Kiran; Anita
- Cinematography: Rasool Ellore
- Edited by: Shankar
- Music by: R. P. Patnaik
- Production company: Anandi Art Creations
- Release date: 10 August 2001
- Country: India
- Language: Telugu
- Box office: ₹16 crore distributors' share

Nuvvu Nenu (transl. You and me) is a 2001 Indian Telugu-language romantic drama film directed by Teja, who co-wrote the script with Dasaradh. The film stars Uday Kiran and Anita in lead roles, with Tanikella Bharani, Telangana Shakuntala, Sunil, and Banerjee in supporting roles. Nuvvu Nenu marked Anita's official acting debut.

Released on 10 August 2001, the film was a major commercial success, collecting a distributor's share of ₹16 crore at the box office. It won four Filmfare Awards South, including Best Film – Telugu, and five Nandi Awards. It was remade in Hindi as Yeh Dil (2003), with Anita reprising her role, and in Tamil as Madurai Veeran (2007).

== Plot ==
Ravi is the son of a multimillionaire in Hyderabad. Vasundhara is the daughter of a milk supplier. Ravi and Vasundhara study in the same college. The film starts with Vasundhara showing hatred towards Ravi, as he is a sportsman who is not good at studies. Over time, her hatred turns into love. Finally, he falls in love with her too. However, their parents do not approve of their marriage and their plan to avoid their marriage is to ask the couple that if they are to marry they must not meet each other for one year. If their love remains even after one year then their parents say they would agree to their marriage.

Ravi's father locks him up in the house in Mumbai, while Vasundhara's father takes her to his hometown and arranges her marriage with another man. However both Ravi and Vasundara manage to escape. They reach a garden where they spend a lot of days working for money. But Ravi's father sends goons to bring back his son. In the end, both of them get married in front of the Legislative Assembly, where the whole college comes to support them.

== Cast ==
- Uday Kiran as Ravi
- Anita as Vasundhara
- Sunil as Venkatesh
- Banerjee as Killer
- Tanikella Bharani as Surya, Vasu's Father
- Radhika Chaudhari as Priya
- Supriya Karnik as Rajendra's partner
- M. S. Narayana as Principal
- Ahuti Prasad as Police officer
- Rallapalli as Caretaker
- Dharmavarapu Subramanyam as Accounts lecturer
- Vizag Prasad as Rajendra, Vasundhara's Father
- Telangana Shakuntala as Surya's elder sister and Vasu's paternal aunt
- Sangeetha
- Madhunandan

== Production ==
Teja contacted Madhavan's spokesperson to sign the actor for the lead role in his film. However, his spokesperson denied the offer citing Madhavan's disinterest in acting in Telugu films. Thus, the role went to Uday Kiran.

== Soundtrack ==
The music was composed by R. P. Patnaik.

No.	Title	Lyrics	Singer(s)	Length
1.	"Gaajuvaka Pilla"	Kulasekhar	R.P. Patnaik, Chorus
2.	"Priyatama"	Kulasekhar	Charan, Usha, Chorus
3.	"Ayyayyo"	Kulasekhar	Ravi Varma, Usha, Chorus
4.	"Nuvvu Nenu"	Kulasekhar	KK, Usha
5.	"Nee Kosame"	Kulasekhar	KK
6.	"Priyatama"	Kulasekhar	Usha
7.	"Naa Gundelo"	Kulasekhar	Sandeep, Usha, Chorus
8.	"Nuvve Naku Pranam"	Kulasekhar	K.K., Usha, Chorus
9.	"Gunnamavi"	Kulasekhar	Mallikarjun, Usha

== Reception ==
Griddaluru Gopalrao of Zamin Ryot praised the film's writing. "For an ordinary story, Teja has written an extra-ordinary screenplay [sic]," Gopalrao added. Jeevi of Idlebrain rated the film 2 3/4 out of 5 stars and opined, "A simple story can be told in a simple manner. But the director used every possible technique to insert the twists and unwanted violence in this film". A critic from Sify wrote, "The film is a mish-mash of Bollywood love stories like Bobby, QSQT and Maine Pyaar Kiya" and praised the music and cinematography".

== Accolades ==
Award (Note: Awards are in Alphabetical order.)	Date of ceremony (Note: Date is linked to the article about the awards held that year, wherever possible.)	Category	Recipient(s)	Result	Ref.
Filmfare Awards South	20 April 2002	Best Film – Telugu	Nuvvu Nenu	Won	
Filmfare Awards South	20 April 2002	Best Director – Telugu	Teja	Won	
Filmfare Awards South	20 April 2002	Best Actor – Telugu	Uday Kiran	Won	
Filmfare Awards South	20 April 2002	Best Music Director – Telugu	R. P. Patnaik	Won	
Nandi Awards	19 October 2002	Best Director	Teja	Won	
Nandi Awards	19 October 2002	Best Character Actor	Tanikella Bharani	Won	
Nandi Awards	19 October 2002	Best Male Comedian	Sunil	Won	
Nandi Awards	19 October 2002	Best Cinematographer	Rasool Ellore	Won	
Nandi Awards	19 October 2002	Best Music Director	R. P. Patnaik	Won	

== Remakes ==
This film was remade into Hindi as Yeh Dil (2003) with Anita reprising her role, and in Tamil as Madurai Veeran (2007).
