= Gudipoodi Srihari =

Journalist (1934–2022)

- Born: 8 September 1934
- Died: 5 July 2022 (aged 87)
- Occupations: Journalist; film and art critic

Gudipoodi Srihari (8 September 1934 – 5 July 2022) was a journalist who worked as a film and art critic for Eenadu and later The Hindu.

== Life and career ==
Gudipoodi Srihari did his Bachelor of Science at Andhra University and his master's degree in Delhi University. He taught PUC students mathematics and physics. For 25 years, he wrote the Harivillu column of Eenadu, which was a social commentary. Starting in 1969, he wrote reviews for the Friday Review and Sunday Magazine sections of The Hindu. He worked as a news broadcaster for the Hyderabad station of All India Radio and introduced M. S. Ramarao, whose Sundara Kanda became famous. He published music reviews in the 1970s. He also worked on the cultural monthly Pallavi.

In 1995, he received a threat from Chiranjeevi fans on a satellite television channel for publishing a negative film review. In an interview in 2000, Srihari recalled "not missed a single Telugu film" and that he was called cynic for doing so. He published two books: one on the cultural heritage’ of Andhra Pradesh and one on the Telugu film industry. Srihari also served as the president of the Film Critics Association. He was the first writer of Great Andhra and worked there until 2006. He was given the ANR National Award in 2016.

He died on 5 July 2022.
