= Kulasekhar =

Indian lyricist (1971–2024)

- Born: 15 August 1971
- Died: 26 November 2024 (aged 53)
- Occupations: Lyricist; writer; director
- Years active: 2000–2008

Kulasekhar (15 August 1971 – 26 November 2024) was an Indian lyricist known for his works in Telugu cinema. He wrote lyrics for over 100 films and had multiple collaborations with director Teja and music director R. P. Patnaik.

Kulasekhar began suffering from memory loss in 2008 due to a mental health condition. This coincided with his directorial debut, Premalekha Rasa (2007), which turned out to be an unsuccessful venture and did not receive a theatrical release for a long time. In 2013, he was arrested for temple theft, later deemed mentally unstable, and sent for treatment. He faced few more arrests for theft accusations, struggled with multiple health problems, and ultimately died in 2024.

== Early life ==
Kulasekhar was born on 15 August 1971 in Simhachalam to T. P. Sriramachandracharyulu and Ranganayakamma. Kulasekhar developed an interest in music and literature from an early age. After completing his formal education, he joined ETV Network as a reporter and later worked with multiple media institutions.

== Film career ==
Kulasekhar joined as an apprentice to Sirivennela Seetharama Sastry to learn the skills of writing lyrics for film songs. His debut came with Chitram (2000), directed by debutant Teja and composed by R. P. Patnaik. Kulasekhar went on to write songs for over 150 films, including Nuvvu Nenu (2001), Manasantha Nuvve (2001), Santosham (2002), Jayam (2002), Dil (2003), Gharshana (2004), and Bommarillu (2006), among others. He had multiple collaborations with director Teja and music director R. P. Patnaik.

== Personal life and death ==
On 24 October 2013, he was arrested by the police in Kakinada for stealing a Satha gopam in Sree Balatripura Sundari Temple and was sentenced to six months in prison. Later, the investigating police determined that he was mentally unstable, and he was subsequently transferred to Rajahmundry for treatment. In another incident, he was arrested for suspicion of theft in temple near Banjara Hills.

According to his friends in Hyderabad, Kulasekhar lost his memory due to a brain disease around 2008. R. P. Patnaik mentioned that Kulasekhar would often disappear for three or four days a few years ago, without anyone knowing for where he left for. His close friends also revealed that he might not even remember his father's death. Kulasekhar’s wife works at a private company and takes care of their two children. Kulasekhar directed a film Premalekha Rasa (2007) during his peak as a lyricist which was unsuccessful even to get released in theatres for a long time. According to the friends, this also contributed to his depression and subsequent health issues.

Kulasekhar died on 26 November 2024, while receiving treatment for a serious illness at Gandhi Hospital in Hyderabad. He was 53, and survived by his wife and two children.

== Filmography ==
- Chitram (2000)
- Mrugaraju (2001)
- Nuvvu Nenu (2001)
- Manasantha Nuvve (2001)
- Kalusukovalani (2002)
- Santhosham (2002)
- Jayam (2002)
- Sontham (2002)
- Ninu Choodaka Nenundalenu (2002)
- Dil (2003)
- Gharshana (2004; also dialogues)
- Avunanna Kadanna (2005)
- Bommarillu (2005)
- Andamaina Manasulo (2008; also dialogues)

== Songs ==
His songs include:

- "Gajuvaka Pilla" - Nuvvu Nenu
- "Priyatama Telusuna" - Nuvvu Nenu
- "Andamaina Manasulo" - Jayam
- "Naa Gundelo" - Nuvvu Nenu
- "Cheliya Cheliya" - Gharshana
- "Nanne Nanne" - Gharshana
- "Ye Chilipi" - Gharshana
- "Andagada" - Gharshana
- "Teeya Teeyani Kalalanu" - Sreeram
- "Enduko Emito" - Dil
- "Yemaindi Ee Vela" - Aadavari Matalaku Arthale Verule
- "Egire Mabbulalona" - Happy
