= List of Telugu films of 2009 =

This is a list of films produced by the Telugu language film industry in the year 2009.

== Box office ==
Highest-grossing films of 2009
Rank	Title	Studio	Worldwide gross	Ref
1	Magadheera	Geetha Arts	₹150 crore	
2	Arundhati	Mallemala Entertainments	₹70 crore	

== Releases ==
Opening		Title	Director	Cast	Production house	Ref
J A N	1	Sasirekha Parinayam	Krishna Vamsi	Tarun, Genelia D'Souza		
J A N	1	Indumathi	Harsha P Reddy	Shweta Bhardwaj, Sivaji		
J A N	14	Maska	B. Gopal	Ram, Hansika Motwani, Sheela		
J A N	16	Arundhati	Kodi Ramakrishna	Anushka, Sonu Sood		
J A N	23	Shh...	Hari Charan Prasad	Shafi, Mithuna		
J A N	30	Bank	Arun Kumar	Jackie Shroff, Raghuvaran, Abbas, Veda		
F E B	5	Konchem Ishtam Konchem Kashtam	Kishore Kumar	Siddharth, Tamannaah		
F E B	13	Satyameva Jayathe	Jeevitha	Rajasekhar, Atul Kulkarni		
F E B	13	Siddham	J. D. Chakravarthy	Jagapati Babu, Sindhu Menon		
F E B	20	Drona	J. Karun Kumar	Nitin, Priyamani, Mukesh Rishi, Kelly Dorjee		
M A R	6	Naa Girlfriend Baga Rich	M. Nagendra Kumar	Sivaji, Kaveri Jha		
M A R	8	Aa Okkadu	N. S. Murthy	Ajay, Madhurima, Suresh Gopi, Sai Srujan		
M A R	12	Mesthri	Suresh Krishna	Dasari Narayana Rao, Mohan Babu, Vijay Kumar		
M A R	20	Malli Malli	Raaj Adithya	Skanda, Kalyanee		
M A R	21	Sontha Ooru	P. Sunil Kumar Reddy	Raja, Theertha		
M A R	27	Manorama	V. Eeswar Reddy	Charmy, Nishan		
A P R	2	Billa	Meher Ramesh	Prabhas, Anushka		
A P R	10	Punnami Naagu	A. Kodandarami Reddy	Mumaith Khan, Rajiv Kanakala		
M A Y	1	Mitrudu	Mahadev	Bala Krishna, Priyamani		
M A Y	8	Kick	Surender Reddy	Ravi Teja, Ileana D'Cruz, Shaam		
M A Y	29	Prayanam	Chandra Sekhar Yeleti	Manoj Manchu, Payal Ghosh		
M A Y	29	Pistha	Sabha Ayyappan	Vishal, Shriya Saran		
M A Y	30	Neramu Siksha	Vijaya Nirmala	Krishna, Vijaya Nirmala, Jayasudha, Akul Balaji		
J U N	5	Kavya's Diary	Karuna Prakash	Charmy Kaur, Manjula Ghattamaneni		
J U N	12	Boni	Raj Pippalla	Sumanth, Kriti Kharbanda, Trinetrudu		
J U N	12	Naa Style Veru	G. Ram Prasad	Rajasekhar, Bhumika Chawla		
J U N	19	Raju Maharaju	Durga Shankaranadh	Mohan Babu, Sharwanand, Ramya Krishna		
J U N	19	Current	Surya Pratap	Sushanth, Sneha Ullal		
J U N	26	Evaraina Epudaina	Marthand K. Shankar	Varun Sandesh, Vimala Raman		
J U L	3	Oy!	Anand Ranga	Siddharth, Shamili, Sunil, Saptagiri, Napoleon		
J U L	10	Gopi Gopika Godavari	Vamsy	Venu, Kamalinee Mukherjee		
J U L	17	Kalavaramaye Madilo	Satish Kasetty	Swati Reddy, Kamal Kamaraju		
J U L	17	Vengamamba	Uday Bhaskar	Meena, Sarath Babu, Sai Kiran		
J U L	31	Magadheera	S. S. Rajamouli	Ram Charan Teja, Kajal Agarwal		
A U G	12	Anjaneyulu	Parasuram (Bujji)	Ravi Teja, Nayantara, Sonu Sood		
S E P	5	Josh	Vasu Varma	Naga Chaitanya, Karthika Nair, J. D. Chakravarthy		
S E P	11	Sankham	Siva	Gopichand, Trisha Krishnan, Sathyaraj		
S E P	18	Baanam	Chaitanya Dantuluri	Nara Rohit, Vedhika		
S E P	24	Ganesh	M. Saravanan	Ram, Kajal Aggarwal		
S E P	19	Eenadu	Chakri Toleti	Kamal Haasan, Venkatesh		
O C T	2	Ninnu Kalisaka	Siva Nageswara Rao	Santosh Samrat, Chaitanya Krishna, Dipa Shah, Piaa Bajpai		
O C T	9	Mahatma	Krishna Vamsi	Srikanth, Bhavana		
O C T	23	Jayeebhava	Naren Kondepati	Kalyan Ram, Hansika Motwani		
O C T	29	Ek Niranjan	Puri Jagannadh	Prabhas, Kangana Ranaut, Sonu Sood		
N O V	5	Villagelo Vinayakudu	Sai Kiran Adivi	Krishnudu, Saranya Mohan		
N O V	6	Bendu Apparao R.M.P.	E. V. V. Satyanarayana	Allari Naresh, Kamna Jethmalani		
N O V	12	Kurradu	Sandeep Gunnam	Varun Sandesh, Neha Sharma		
N O V	19	Jagadguru Sri Shiridi Saibaba	G. Ramakrishna	B. V. Reddy, Suman		
N O V	25	Arya 2	Sukumar	Allu Arjun, Kajal Agarwal, Navdeep		
N O V	28	Dill Boss	Gankidi Raghavender Reddy	Fayaz, Srinivas, Srithik, Bhargav, Sandeep		
D E C	4	Pravarakhyudu	Madan	Jagapati Babu, Priyamani		
D E C	4	Amaravathi	Ravi Babu	Bhoomika Chawla, Taraka Ratna, Sneha, Sindhura Gadde		
D E C	11	Bumper Offer	Jaya Ravindra	Sairam Shankar, Bindu Madhavi, Sayaji Shinde		
D E C	11	Saleem	Y. V. S. Chowdary	Vishnu Manchu, Ileana D'Cruz, Mohan Babu		
D E C	24	Kasko	G. Nageswara Reddy	Vaibhav, Swetha Basu Prasad, Gowri Pandit		
D E C	25	Posani Gentleman	Posani Krishna Murali	Posani Krishna Murali, Aarthi Agarwal, Natasha		

== See also ==
- List of Telugu films of 2008
- Lists of Telugu-language films
- List of Telugu films of 2010
