= Kick (2009 film) =

2009 Indian film by Surender Reddy

- Film poster
- Directed by: Surender Reddy
- Screenplay by: Surender Reddy
- Story by: Vakkantham Vamsi; Dialogues: Abburi Ravi
- Produced by: R. R. Venkat
- Starring: Ravi Teja; Ileana; Shaam
- Cinematography: Rasool Ellore
- Edited by: Gautham Raju
- Music by: Thaman S
- Production company: R. R. Movie Makers
- Distributed by: Suresh Productions
- Release date: 8 May 2009
- Running time: 162 minutes
- Country: India
- Language: Telugu
- Box office: est.₹30 crore distributors' share

Kick (Note: Spelt as Kik on the CBFC certificate.) is a 2009 Indian Telugu-language vigilante action comedy film directed by Surender Reddy with story written by Vakkantham Vamsi. The film stars Ravi Teja, Ileana D'Cruz, and Shaam (in his Telugu debut) while Brahmanandam and Ali play supporting roles. The film also has music composed by Thaman S. Upon release, the film became a major commercial success garnering unanimous positive reviews and critical acclaim for its plot, lead actors performances, comedy, musical score and direction. Over the years, Kick attained a cult status in Telugu Cinema for its entertainment quotient and many Cine Analysts also regard the film as a benchmark for wholesome entertainment. Music Composer Thaman S attained overnight stardom for his musical score for the film and also went on to become one of the most successful and bankable Music Composers of Telugu Cinema over the years.

Kick also went on to become the third highest-grossing Telugu film of 2009 collecting a distributor's share of ₹25-30 crore at the box office only behind Arundhati and the Mega Blockbuster, Magadheera and was the highest-grossing film in Ravi Teja's career at that point up until Balupu in 2013.

The film was remade in Tamil as Thillalangadi (2010) with Shaam reprising his role, and in Hindi under the same title (2014) and in Kannada as Super Ranga (2014). A sequel, Kick 2 also starring Teja and directed by Reddy was released in 2015.

== Plot ==
Kalyan is a happy-go-lucky man who excels in every field but always does strange and dangerous things to obtain a certain "kick" – a thrill or excitement that he craves. One such activity is secretly double-crossing his childhood friend Azam while helping him to elope. At this point, he meets Naina, who is shocked at his recklessness and writes him off as crazy. Kalyan sets his sights on Naina and woos her in a very unorthodox way; he begs her not to fall in love with him. After a host of comical situations, she accepts his love. However, she sets a condition: he must stay in a well-paid job (as he had resigned from other jobs due to the lack of "kick"), and only then she will agree to marry him. Kalyan accepts, but soon resigns again for the same reason and tries to hide it from her. When she finds out, she breaks up with him and leaves him for good.

Some months later, Naina's parents arrange for her to meet a prospective suitor in Malaysia. Though reluctant, she meets the suitor, Kalyan Krishna, a tough but honest policeman. She narrates the story of her affair with Kalyan, and Kalyan Krishna reveals that he is tracking a dangerous thief who has stolen large amounts of money from wealthy, mostly corrupt, politicians. In Malaysia, Nisha, her sister and Kalyan Krishna's brother-in-law Prakash Raj run into Kalyan again, but learn that he has lost his memory and cannot remember his past life. Naina sees this as an opportunity to start their relationship again from the scratch. However, it is revealed that he has faked his condition by convincing an amnesiac that he is a doctor, and tricked him into diagnosing his condition falsely. Naina is upset but realizes that it was done because of his love for her, and she has hidden her own feelings from him. They reconcile.

Meanwhile, it is revealed that the thief whom Kalyan Krishna has been tracking is Kalyan. His motives are simple; he steals ill-gotten money from politicians to pay for operations for children suffering from cancer. After manipulating various people, such as an MLA, and stealing from them, he is finally caught in the act by Kalyan Krishna. Kalyan is still unfazed, celebrating his failure at a street party. He dares Kalyan Krishna to catch him in his final crime: stealing money worth ₹500 crore (US$53 million) from the party fund. After many harrowing chases, Kalyan pulls it off successfully. Kalyan Krishna is demoted from his job and is shocked to learn that his replacement is Kalyan, who promises to "guard" the minister's remaining money. Knowing what is in store for the politicians, Kalyan Krishna leaves with a new respect for his foe after learning his true motives of helping the children.

== Cast ==
- Ravi Teja as Kalyan Alias Kick
- Ileana D'Cruz as Naina (Voice dubbed by Haritha)
- Shaam as IPS Kalyan Krishna (Voice dubbed by P. Ravi Shankar)
- Brahmanandam as Halwa Raj / Prakash Raj a.k.a. Parugu Prakash Raj
- Jaya Prakash Reddy as J. P. Reddy IPS
- Ali as Dr. Baali
- Sayaji Shinde as Gurajada Krishnamurthy alias GK, Kalyan's father
- Venu Madhav as Azam
- Kota Srinivasa Rao as the chief minister
- Prabha as Vasundhara, Kalyan's mother
- Nalini as Kancha Kanakaratnam, Naina's friend's mother
- Raghu Babu as Pathan, a local don
- Duvvasi Mohan as Don's gang member
- Sairabanu as Azam's wife
- Nadhiya as Prabhavati, Naina's aunt
- Rao Ramesh as Sivaji, Naina's uncle
- Sindhu Tolani as Swapna
- L. B. Sriram as the orphanage manager
- Sravan as Adithya
- Dharmavarapu Subramanyam as Subramanyam, Kalyan's friend
- Geetha as Janaki, Kalyan Krishna's mother
- Chalapathi Rao as Krishnam Raju, Kalyan Krishna's father
- Prudhvi Raj as the minister
- Surya as the minister's binami
- Banerjee as Banerjee, Naina's father
- Narsing Yadav as a minister
- Aasheekaa Bathija as Naina's sister
- Shankar Melkote as Kalyan's former manager
- Raghu Karumanchi as a priest
- Hazel Crowney in an item number

== Production ==
The film was financed by R. R. Venkat under his banner, R. R. Movie Makers. It is the second collaboration between Ravi Teja and Ileana D'Cruz after Khatarnak. The cinematographer was Rasool Ellore and the editor was Gautham Raju, in his fourth collaboration with the director after Athanokkade, Ashok and Athidhi. In 2009, before the release of the film Agam Puram (2010), Surender Reddy chose the Tamil actor Shaam to play a policeman in Kick after looking at stills from that film.

== Soundtrack ==
Kick

Soundtrack album by S. Thaman
- Released: 8 May 2009
- Recorded: 2009
- Genre: Feature film soundtrack
- Length: 26:43
- Label: Aditya Music
- Producer: S. Thaman

S. Thaman chronology
Sindhanai Sei (2008)	Kick (2009)	Moscowin Kavery (2009)

The audio was launched on 19 April 2009 at a function in Taj Deccan. The prelude of "Dil Kalaase" was based on "Conteo" by Don Omar from the album King of Kings. The song "Gore Gore" was reused from the delayed film Moscowin Kavery.

All lyrics are written by Sirivennela Sitaramasastri; all music is composed by Thaman S.

Track-List
No.	Title	Artist(s)	Length
1.	"Dil Kalaase"	Anushka Manchanda & Chorus	03:49
2.	"I Dont Want Love"	Karthik & Chorus	05:19
3.	"Dhim Thana (Atu Chudoddhannana)"	K. S. Chithra, S. Thaman (Chorus) & Ranjith (Chorus)	05:03
4.	"Gore Gore"	Karthik, Jyotsna & S. Thaman (Chorus)	05:09
5.	"Manase Thadisela"	Vardhani Thaman	02:19
6.	"Bossuu Manaki Memory Lossuu"	Ravi Teja (Vocals), Ali (Vocals), Ranjith, Rahul Nambiar, Naveen Madhav	05:02
Total length:			26:43

== Reception ==
Kick received widely positive reviews. A critic from Sify gave a review writing, "The film has been made well but it could have better scenes. Overall, since there are no other movies in sight now, Kick being a paisa vasool movie will definitely have a good run at the box office."

Shaam, a Tamil actor, got his breakthrough in the Telugu film industry through this film and, as a result, he earned the name "Kick Shaam".

== Remakes ==
The film was remade in Tamil as Thillalangadi, in Hindi under the same title (2014) with Salman Khan and in Kannada as Super Ranga.

== Sequel ==
A sequel was announced, titled Kick 2, with the same lead actor Ravi Teja and director Surender Reddy. Music was again composed by S. Thaman. It was produced by the actor Nandamuri Kalyan Ram. It was launched on 10 August 2014 and was released on 21 August 2015.
