= N. T. R. Arts =

Indian film production company

- Industry: Entertainment
- Founded: Banjara Hills, Hyderabad, Telangana, India
- Headquarters: Hyderabad, India
- Key people: Nandamuri Kalyan Ram and N. T. Rama Rao Jr.
- Products: Films
- Owner: Nandamuri Kalyan Ram
- Parent: Ramakrishna Cine Studios

N. T. R. Arts is an Indian film production company in Banjara Hills, Hyderabad. Established by actor Nandamuri Kalyan Ram, it is named after his grandfather Nandamuri Taraka Rama Rao.

== History ==
Nandamuri Kalyan Ram established the production house with the name of his grandfather, actor, and former Chief Minister of Andhra Pradesh, Nandamuri Taraka Rama Rao, known as 'NTR'. The production house has introduced directors such as Surender Reddy, Anil Ravipudi, and Mallidi Vassishta to Tollywood. Former film producer and politician, Nandamuri Janaki Ram, elder son of Nandamuri Harikrishna, was also a part of the banner until he died in a car accident, on December 6, 2014.

== Film Production ==
Key
| † | Denotes films that have not yet been released |

| Year | Film | Director |
|---|---|---|
| 2005 | Athanokkade | Surender Reddy |
| 2008 | Hare Ram | Harshavardhan |
| 2009 | Jayeebhava | Naren Kondapati |
| 2010 | Kalyanram Kathi | Mallikarjun |
| 2013 | Om 3D | Sunil Reddy |
| 2015 | Pataas | Anil Ravipudi |
| 2015 | Kick 2 | Surender Reddy |
| 2016 | Ism | Puri Jagannadh |
| 2017 | Jai Lava Kusa | K. S. Ravindra |
| 2022 | Bimbisara | Mallidi Vassishta |
| 2024 | Devara: Part 1 | Koratala Siva |
| 2025 | Arjun Son of Vyjayanthi | Pradeep Chilukuri |
| 2027 | Dragon † | Prashanth Neel |
| TBA | Devara: Part 2 † | Koratala Siva |
