= Pataas =

2015 film by Anil Ravipudi

- Theatrical release poster
- Directed by: Anil Ravipudi
- Written by: Anil Ravipudi
- Produced by: Nandamuri Kalyan Ram
- Starring: Nandamuri Kalyan Ram; Shruti Sodhi; Sai Kumar; Ashutosh Rana
- Cinematography: Sarvesh Murari
- Edited by: Tammiraju
- Music by: Sai Karthik
- Production company: N.T.R. Arts
- Distributed by: Sri Venkateswara Creations (AP & Telangana); Blue Sky (United States)
- Release date: 23 January 2015
- Running time: 133 minutes
- Country: India
- Language: Telugu
- Budget: ₹7 crore
- Box office: est. ₹28.7 crore

Pataas (transl. Cracker) is a 2015 Indian Telugu-language action comedy film written and directed by debutant Anil Ravipudi and produced by Nandamuri Kalyan Ram under his banner N.T.R. Arts. It stars Kalyan Ram, Shruti Sodhi, Sai Kumar and Ashutosh Rana. Sai Karthik composed the film's music.

The film revolves around Kalyan Sinha, a corrupt police officer, who gets himself transferred to Hyderabad, where his estranged father, Murali Krishna, is serving as the DGP. Kalyan hates his father and intends to teach him a lesson, and in the process, supports a local MP and criminal named GK. With time, realizing some of his actions have gone wrong. Kalyan has a change of heart and decides to stand by his father and help the force take down GK and his allies.

Releasing theatrically on 23 January 2015, Pataas received positive reviews from critics and turned out to be Kalyan Ram's second most successful film at the box office after Athanokkade. It was remade in Tamil as Motta Shiva Ketta Shiva and in Kannada as Pataki.

== Plot ==
Kalyan Sinha is a corrupt IPS officer who gets himself transferred to Hyderabad as ACP and misuses his power to gain monetary benefits in unorthodox methods. During this process, he also encourages a local MP named GK, who has become a headache to Murali Krishna, the DGP of Telangana.

Kalyan happens to be Murali's son, who is angry at the latter as his supposed negligence killed his mother and newborn sister, though Murali actually left his wife in the hospital to save several families in a riot. Unaware of this, Kalyan left Murali and joined an orphanage where he became an IPS officer to seek revenge on his father. During his life in Hyderabad, Kalyan also meets two women: Mahathi, a journalist working for TV5 and Kavya, a deaf-mute philanthropist who works in a coffee shop. He loves Mahathi and expects her to reciprocate the same only to be rejected by her because of his corrupt nature. Kavya is killed by GK's brother Nani when she tries to save a techie from being assaulted by him near HITEC City. Kalyan considered Kavya as his sister and her death enrages him, so he turns against GK.

GK wants to make Nani a politician while Kalyan challenges GK to save Nani from getting arrested. GK manages to kidnap the techie, but with the help of a transgender, who is the main witness, Kalyan arrests Nani with a non-bailable warrant. He also challenges GK to bring Nani out of prison within 3 days. Murali and Kalyan are united, and Kalyan's marriage with Mahathi is approved. On the third day, GK's men kidnap the transgender and Mahathi. Murali, along with his team, go to the spot to save the witness, while Kalyan goes to save Mahathi. Kalyan saves Mahathi, but is very far from Murali, who is killed along with his team and the transgender by GK and his partners. Nani and his friends are released from jail, and Kalyan plans to kill all of them with the help of an old NRI turned actor Tsunami star Subhash.

Kalyan and his team assault one of GK's partners and his son and throw them on a railway track. They die with a fast train passing over them. The other partner and his son are intoxicated, and their car is made to collide with a static truck. Subhash enters the spot, disguised as a taxi driver, and presents himself as a witness to that accident, citing alcohol being the reason behind those two deaths. GK's two key henchmen are killed by transgender people, and police, with the help of Subhash, make media believe that they were killed in a stampede caused by fans of actress Tamannaah upon learning that she is inaugurating a mall. GK plans to escape to Delhi along with Nani to gain his position as an MP again with high security but is trapped by Ramesh, the head of police security who failed to arrest GK in the past in an illegal land acquisition dispute.

They reach the same spot where Murali was killed, and after being severely assaulted by Kalyan, the duo is made to sit in a car on which petrol is poured. The police shoot the car, and the duo dies in a blast. Subhash enters the spot as himself, who tells the media that he visited this place for location-scouting, and the duo died when they smoked in a No smoking area, triggering an explosion.

== Cast ==
- Nandamuri Kalyan Ram as ACP Kalyan Sinha
- Shruti Sodhi as Mahathi
- P. Sai Kumar as DGP Murali Krishna IPS
- Ashutosh Rana as GK
- Srinivasa Reddy as CI Reddy
- M. S. Narayana as Tsunami Star Subhash
- Madhunandan as Hijra
- Jaya Prakash Reddy as Central Minister JP
- Posani Krishna Murali as Home Minister
- Y. Kasi Viswanath as Murali's colleague
- Pavitra Lokesh as Kalyan's mother
- Prachi Thaker as Kavya
- Ashish Gandhi
- Sivannarayana Naripeddi as Mahathi's brother-in-law
- Jhansi as Mahathi's sister
- Praveen as GK's nephew
- Raghu Karumanchi as Mahathi's colleague
- Prudhvi Raj as Politician
- Prabhas Sreenu as Politician
- Sameer as Ramesh
- Charandeep as GK's henchman
- Narsing Yadav
- Gautham Raju as Reporter
- Shakalaka Shankar as Police officer
- Sudharshan as GK's supporter
- Kadambari Kiran as Reporter
- Josh Ravi as GK's supporter
- Gemini Suresh
- Anil Ravipudi in a cameo appearance as one of the kidnappers of Central Minister JP in Chhattisgarh

== Production ==
=== Development ===
Anil Ravipudi worked with Santosh Srinivas in the latter's directorial debut Kandireega (2011) as a writer and wrote this film's script. He later approached Nandamuri Kalyan Ram through a friend. Kalyan Ram liked the script and wanted to produce the film with other actor. However Ravipudi wanted Kalyan Ram to play the lead role which he accepted. Kalyan Ram was busy with the production of Om 3D (2013) and Ravipudi was constantly in touch with him. After completing with the writing, he again approached Kalyan Ram and both began working on the film.

Reports of Ravipudi making his directorial debut by collaborating with Kalyan Ram emerged in late March 2014 and Pre-production work was in progress. The film was launched on 9 May 2014 at Ramanaidu Studios and was titled as Pataas. The filming of Temper (2015) was halted as its basic plot resembled this film's storyline. Ravipudi said in an interview that the film runs in the pattern of Singam (2010) with Telugu nativity and is about a corrupt cop who changes for the good, adding that it would be an image makeover for Kalyan Ram.

=== Casting ===
After Baahubali: The Beginning, Rana Daggubati was approached to play the lead role in the film, but he denied the offer as the police officer role required him to have short hair. Nandamuri Kalyan Ram was seen as a police officer in the film. Shruti Sodhi was cast as the female lead in late May 2014 marking her debut in Telugu cinema. She was approached by Ravipudi after watching her pictures and was seen as a journalist in the film which was her job before entering films. She described her character as a "morally, ethically correct and a strong worded girl", adding that the film is a hero-centric film. N. T. Rama Rao Jr. was rumored to make a cameo appearance in the remix of the song Arey O Samba which remained unconfirmed.

Sai Kumar was cast to play the role of Director General of Police and Srinivasa Reddy was cast for a supporting role. A spoof was performed by the latter on the former's famous dialogue from the film Police Story (1996). Television anchor Jhansi made a comeback with this film after a brief hiatus. Comedian M. S. Narayana was cast for a supporting role who died on the day of the film's release.

=== Filming ===
Principal photography began on 10 May 2014 at Hyderabad. By late October 2014, 90% of the filming was complete and an action sequence featuring Kalyan Ram and others were shot at Ramoji Film City. Shruti Sodhi almost completed filming for her part by late October 2014. The Remixed version of the song Arey O Samba was shot on Kalyan Ram and Shruti Sodhi at Hyderabad in early November 2014. After completing the shoot of a couple of songs, the filming ended on 22 November 2014. The same was confirmed by Kalyan Ram before the commencement of post-production phase.

Ravipudi revealed in an interview that the film was shot in seventy working days and added that he directed the film without a scene paper on hand and knew every dialogue of each character and scene in hand. Despite being a trained dancer, Shruti Sodhi found the Telugu style of dancing difficult and said, "The choreographers’ movements are so fluid, the rhythm is amazing, they were a bit tough as it was the folk style. Also Telugu is not my language; so putting on right expressions for the language was tough" in an interview.

== Music ==
Sai Karthik composed the film's music and background score. The soundtrack consists of five songs, four originally composed by Karthk and written by Sri Mani, B. Subbaraya Sarma and Tadaila Bapu apart from the remixed version of the song Arey O Samba composed by Bappi Lahari and written by Bhuvanachandra for the film Rowdy Inspector (1992). Karthik initially wanted to retain the background music of the original in the remixed version but later modified them to a small extent. Shreyas Music acquired the audio rights in early December 2014. The official track list was unveiled on 4 February 2014.

The soundtrack was supposed to be launched on 7 December 2014. But it was postponed due to the death of Kalyan Ram's brother Nandamuri Janakiram in an accident. The release date was announced as 1 January 2015 in late December 2014. Actors N. T. Rama Rao Jr. and Ravi Teja along with directors Puri Jagannadh and Surender Reddy among others attended the audio launch event held at Hyderabad along with the film's cast and crew. Rama Rao Jr. unveiled the soundtrack discs and Ravi Teja received the first copy.

Pataas

Soundtrack album by Sai Karthik
- Released: 2015
- Recorded: 2015
- Genre: Soundtrack
- Length: 19:32
- Label: Lahari Music
- Producer: Sai Karthik

Sai Karthik chronology
Nuvvala Nenila (2014)	Pataas (2015)	Asura (2015)

Track-List
No.	Title	Lyrics	Singer(s)	Length
1.	"Arey O Samba" (Remix)	Bhuvanachandra	Jaspreet Jasz, Divija Karthik	3:48
2.	"Power Unnodu"	B. Subbaraya Sharma	Ranjith	3:36
3.	"Dhamki Maaro"	Sri Mani	Tippu	4:01
4.	"Osi Chinnadanna"	Sri Mani	Rahul Nambiar	4:09
5.	"Tappa Tappam"	Taidala Bapu	M. L. R. Karthikeyan, Suchitra	3:58
Total length:				19:32

== Release ==
=== Legal issues ===
A case was filed against the movie and the film makers for the inappropriate usage of the national Emblem of India in the title logo.

=== Critical reception ===
The film received positive reviews from critics. Timesofindia.indiatimes.com rated it 3.5 out of 5 and stated that the film is a 'vindhu bhojanam' in the truest sense.

=== Box office ===
Pataas earned ₹1.7 crore on its opening day. By the end of its theatrical run, the film grossed ₹28.7 crore and was successful at the box office.

== Accolades ==
Year	Ceremony	Category	Nominee	Result
2016	5th South Indian International Movie Awards	Best Debut Director (Telugu)	Anil Ravipudi	Won
2016	5th South Indian International Movie Awards	Best Comedian (Telugu)	Srinivasa Reddy	Nominated
2016	5th South Indian International Movie Awards	Best Female Debut (Telugu)	Shruti Sodhi	Nominated
2016	14th Santosham Film Awards	Best Debut Director	Anil Ravipudi	Won
2016	1st IIFA Utsavam	Performance in a Comic Role	Srinivasa Reddy	Nominated
2016	1st IIFA Utsavam	Performance in a Supporting Role - Female	Prachi Thaker	Nominated

== Remakes ==
Kannada remake rights of the film were bought by S. V. Babu while R. B. Choudry has bought the rights for Tamil. The film was remade in Tamil as Motta Shiva Ketta Shiva with Raghava Lawrence and in Kannada as Pataki with Ganesh.
