= Asadhyudu =

- Poster
- Directed by: Anil Krishna
- Screenplay by: Anil Krishna
- Story by: Anil Krishna
- Produced by: Vallurupalli Ramesh Babu
- Dialogue by: Nandyala Ravi
- Starring: Nandamuri Kalyan Ram; Diya
- Cinematography: Bhupesh R. Bhupathi
- Edited by: Gautham Raju
- Music by: Chakri
- Production company: Maharishi Cinema
- Release date: 16 February 2006
- Running time: 135 minutes
- Country: India
- Language: Telugu

Asadhyudu (transl. Impossible man) is a 2006 Indian Telugu-language action film written and directed by Anil Krishna in his directorial debut. Produced by Vallurupalli Ramesh Babu under Maharishi Cinema banner, the film stars Nandamuri Kalyan Ram, Diya, Chalapathi Rao, and Ravi Kale. Music was scored by Chakri, while Vikram Dharma choreographed the action sequences. The film follows Pardhoo, a Vizag-based college student who refuses to be a bystander while something evil is happening in front of him. Unable to tolerate injustice, he decides to fight a gang led by Hyderabad-based criminal brothers named Prakash and Thambi.

The film was released theatrically on 16 February 2006, receiving praise for Kalyan Ram's performance and action sequences. However, it failed commercially at the box office.

== Plot ==
Pardhu, a college student who hates to see inequality around him, fights a dangerous criminal gang in Hyderabad run by Prakash and his younger brother, Thambi.

== Cast ==
- Nandamuri Kalyan Ram as Pardhu
- Diya as Madhuri
- Ravi Kale as Prakash, Thambi's elder brother
- Chalapathi Rao as Pardhu's father
- Kavitha as Pardhu's mother
- Vinayakan as Thambi, Prakash's younger brother
- Charan Raj as Raghunath
- Satyam Rajesh as Pardhu's friend
- Ahuti Prasad as ACP Ram
- Sudeepa Pinky as Pardhu's sister
- Vinod Kumar Alva as ACP Ravi Varma
- Raghu Babu as Govind, Prakash's henchman
- Krishna Bhagavan as Prakash's lawyer
- G. V. Sudhakar Naidu as Prakash's henchman
- Preeti Nigam as ACP Ram's wife
- Jeeva as Varadarajulu
- Devadas Kanakala
- Prudhviraj as Prakash's henchman
- Kaushal Manda as College student
- Fish Venkat as Prakash's henchman

== Production ==
The film's script was developed by Anil Krishna while he was in Mumbai. He wanted to cast Kalyan Ram after watching a promo of his film Toli Choopulone. As Kalyan Ram was busy shooting for Athanokkade with Surender Reddy, Krishna narrated the script to various actors including Kannada film actor Puneeth Rajkumar and producer Medikonda Murali Krishna who liked the script but couldn't work on it due to date issues. It was upon his return to Hyderabad that producer Vallurupalli Ramesh Babu asked him if he were interested in narrating a story to Kalyan Ram, and the actor immediately decided to work with Krishna upon listening to the script narrated to him within one and a half hours. The film was initially titled Parthu after the protagonist, but changes were made and the title was later changed to Asadhyudu.

== Soundtrack ==
The music was composed by Chakri and released by Aditya Music. The audio launch function was held on 25 January 2006 at Annapurna studios.

Asadhyudu

Soundtrack album by Chakri
- Released: 25 January 2006
- Recorded: 2006
- Genre: Soundtrack
- Length: 25:58
- Label: Aditya Music
- Producer: Chakri

Chakri chronology
Devadasu (2006)	Asadhyudu (2006)	Bhagyalakshmi Bumper Draw (2006)

Track list
No.	Title	Lyrics	Singer(s)	Length
1.	"Shikidham"	Ananta Sriram	Chakri	4:37
2.	"Vetagadi Vatamunna"	Bandaru Danaiah	Vasu, Malathi	3:54
3.	"Aunani Kadhani"	Chandu	Harish Raghavendra, Smita	3:50
4.	"Kalisina Samayana"	Chandu	Karthik, Kousalya	3:52
5.	"Haissa Item Paparo"	Ramajogayya Sastry	Ravi Varma, Rajesh, Tina	4:03
6.	"Rakkasi"	Ramajogayya Sastry	Yakendhar R.	2:21
7.	"Rum Rum Ramude"	Velpula Venkatesh	Simha, Tippu, Sudha	3:21
Total length:				25:58
