= Lakshmana (film) =

- Directed by: R. Chandru
- Screenplay by: R. Chandru
- Based on: Athanokkade (Telugu) by Surender Reddy
- Produced by: Vatsala Revanna
- Starring: Anoop; Meghana Raj
- Cinematography: Santhosh Rai Pathaje
- Edited by: K. M. Prakash
- Music by: Arjun Janya
- Production company: Sai Ranga Entertainment Pvt Ltd.
- Distributed by: RS Films
- Release date: 24 June 2016
- Country: India
- Language: Kannada

Lakshmana is a 2016 Indian Kannada language action film directed and written by R. Chandru. The film stars newcomer Anoop and Meghana Raj with V. Ravichandran playing a cameo role. The soundtrack and original score were composed by Arjun Janya whilst the cinematography was by Santhosh Rai Pathaje. The film is a remake of Telugu film Athanokkade (2005).

Lakshmana was officially launched on 12 June 2015 in presence of Karnataka Chief Minister Siddaramaiah. The film's teaser was launched by the acclaimed filmmaker S. S. Rajamouli in December 2015. The film was released on 24 June 2016 across Karnataka.

== Cast ==
- Anoop as Lakshmana
- Meghana Raj
- Prabhakar
- Chikkanna
- Pradeep Rawat
- Sadhu Kokila
- Sridevi Vijayakumar
- Chitra Shenoy
- Avinash
- V. Ravichandran as a police officer (guest appearance)

== Soundtrack ==
Lakshmana

Soundtrack album by Arjun Janya
- Released: March 2016
- Genre: Feature film soundtrack
- Language: Kannada
- Label: Anand Audio

The music for the film and soundtrack are composed by Arjun Janya. The soundtrack album consists of 6 tracks and one instrumental piece.

Track list
No.	Title	Lyrics	Singer(s)	Length
1.	"Naa Noorakke Nooru"	Shivananje Gowda, R. Chandru	Santhosh Venky
2.	"Nenne Monne"	Shivananje Gowda	Karthik, Sri Raksha Achar
3.	"Kowsalya"	Lokesh Krishna	Vijay Prakash
4.	"Rave Rave"	Shivananje Gowda	Arjun Janya, Indu Nagaraj
5.	"Chandamama"	V. Nagendra Prasad	S. P. Balasubrahmanyam, Anuradha Bhat
6.	"Kowsalya"	Lokesh Krishna	Vijay Prakash
7.	"Lakshmana Theme Music"		Instrumental
16.	Untitled (remix)
