= Jai Lava Kusa =

2017 Indian film by Bobby Kolli

- Theatrical release poster
- Directed by: Bobby Kolli
- Written by: Bobby Kolli (dialogues)
- Screenplay by: Kona Venkat; K. Chakravarthy Reddy
- Story by: Bobby Kolli
- Produced by: Nandamuri Kalyan Ram
- Starring: N. T. Rama Rao Jr; Raashii Khanna; Nivetha Thomas
- Cinematography: Chota K. Naidu
- Edited by: Kotagiri Venkateswara Rao; Tammiraju
- Music by: Devi Sri Prasad
- Production company: N.T.R. Arts
- Distributed by: Sri Venkateswara Creations
- Release date: 21 September 2017
- Running time: 159 minutes
- Country: India
- Language: Telugu
- Budget: ₹45 crore
- Box office: ₹150–175 crore

Jai Lava Kusa is a 2017 Indian Telugu-language action comedy drama film written by Kona Venkat and directed by K. S. Ravindra(Bobby Kolli) and produced by Nandamuri Kalyan Ram under his banner N. T. R. Arts. The film stars N. T. Rama Rao Jr in a triple role as Jai, Lava and Kusa, alongside Raashii Khanna, Nivetha Thomas, Tamannaah (Special Appearance), Ronit Roy (in his Telugu film debut), Posani Krishna Murali, Pradeep Rawat, Pavitra Lokesh, Sai Kumar and Nassar.

The film follows identical triplets, Jai, Lava, and Kusa, who get separated at a young age and follow different paths in life. Jai becomes an evil criminal named Ravan, Kusa becomes a small-time crook and Lava becomes a bank manager. Jai, the eldest of the identical triplets, was sidelined at a very young age due to stammering. He then develops a hatred for his younger brothers and creates havoc in their lives as they all reunite as adults.

The film was launched formally on 10 February 2016, whereas the commencement of principal photography took place the very same day. The shooting took place on Hyderabad, except a few scenes shot at Pune, and was wrapped up in September 2016. The film score and soundtrack were composed by Devi Sri Prasad, with cinematography by Chota K. Naidu and editing by Kotagiri Venkateshwara Rao and Thammi Raju.

The film was released on 4,000 screens, during the first day of the Navratri season on 21 September 2017. The film received mixed to positive reviews from critics, with N. T. Rama Rao Jr 's performance in the triple role receiving praise, while the writing also garnered appreciation. The film collected over ₹150-175 crore worldwide and was a commercial success at the box office. It was screened in Bucheon International Fantastic Film Festival in Category of "Best of Asia" in South Korea.

== Plot ==
Jai, Lava, and Kusa are identical triplets raised by their maternal uncle following their mother's demise. Though Jai deeply loves his brothers, he is ostracized due to his severe stammering. Despite his natural acting talent, he is excluded from drama performances, while Lava and Kusa receive all the affection and praise. Consumed by feelings of isolation and anger, Jai sets the drama stage on fire during a performance by his brothers and flees into the night. Though the three brothers survive, they are presumed to be perished in the fire.

Twenty years later, the brothers lead vastly different lives. Kusa is a petty thief in Hyderabad desperately scheming to move to the United States, though his plans are derailed by demonetisation. While escaping a botched robbery, he crosses paths with Lava, a naive and principled bank manager whose overly trusting nature costs him his job after he unknowingly sanctions a loan for fraudulent business. Meanwhile, Lava falls in love with Priya, a marriage consultant, and wins her affection. Seeking a quick fortune, Kusa impersonates Lava to rob the bank, framing him for the heist before vanishing.

Shortly after, Priya mysteriously disappears, and Lava is falsely accused of bank robbery and her abduction. When Lava confronts Kusa, Kusa admits to the theft but denies kidnapping Priya. Kaakha, a gangster posing as a police officer investigating Priya's abduction, reveals that Jai is alive. Having fled the fire, Jai was taken in by Kaakha in Odisha, growing up to become Raavan, a feared crime lord and aspiring politician. Kaakha brings Lava and Kusa to Jai's estate, where Jai reveals that he orchestrated Priya's kidnapping to force his brothers into serving his ambitions.

While Lava is instructed to impersonate Jai in public to soften his image and win public support for the upcoming election, Kusa is tasked with wooing Simran, the resentful sister of his late henchman, whom he intends to marry. Remorseful over their childhood mistreatment of Jai, Lava attempts to reform his brother with Priya's support, while Kusa cooperates with Simran, who seeks vengeance against Jai believing he had caused her brother's death.

As Lava successfully wins over the electorate while posing as Raavan and Simran pretends to reciprocate Jai's affection while having fallen in love with Kusa, Jai plots to eliminate his brothers by rigging their vehicle with explosives. Realizing the trap, Lava and Kusa choose to enter the car anyway, hoping their sacrifice will finally reform Jai. Their uncle, who has been captured by Jai, begs him to spare them, but he remains stoic.

Before the bomb can detonate, Sarkar, a rival crime lord, ambushes the vehicle. Unaware of the triplets' existence, Sarkar demands to know which of the two captives is the real Raavan. In an attempt to protect each other, both Lava and Kusa claim the identity. Sarkar shoots Lava, believing him to be Raavan. A violent brawl ensues until Jai arrives at the scene, killing Sarkar and his henchmen to protect his brothers. Severely wounded in the crossfire, a dying Jai tearfully confesses his lifelong love for his brothers and asks for their forgiveness, finally redeeming himself before succumbing to his injuries.

== Cast ==
- N. T. Rama Rao Jr. in a triple role as:
  - Jai Kumar (Raavan)
  - Lava Kumar
  - Kusa Kumar
- Raashii Khanna as Priya, Lava's girlfriend
- Nivetha Thomas as Simran, Kusa's girlfriend
- Ronit Roy as Sarkar Sahai, Jai's ally turned rival
- Posani Krishna Murali as Jai, Lava, and Kusa's uncle
- Pavitra Lokesh as Jai, Lava, and Kusa's mother
- Sai Kumar as Kaakha, Jai's right-hand man and guardian
- Pradeep Rawat as Yadagiri
- Nassar as Dhanunjay Sashtri
- Abhimanyu Singh as Rudhra Tiwari
- Harish Uthaman as Tapan, Jai's right-hand man and Simran's brother
- Hamsa Nandini as V. A. Rajini, Lava's co-employee in Needs Bank
- Nanditha Raj as Sravani
- Priyadarshi Pullikonda as Obulesh 'Obu'
- Shiju as Priya's father
- Praveen as Kusa's friend
- Jaya Prakash Reddy as Sravani's father
- Brahmaji as Rambabu, bank assistant manager
- Prabhas Sreenu as Bank Recovery Officer
- Chalapathi Rao as Obulesh's father
- Satya as Ali, Bank watchman
- Shatru as Jai's henchmen
- Rakesh Varre as Deva, Sarkar's son
- Viva Harsha

Cameo appearance

- Sharath Lohitashwa as Mishra
- Tamannaah Bhatia in the song "Swing Zara"

== Production ==
=== Development ===
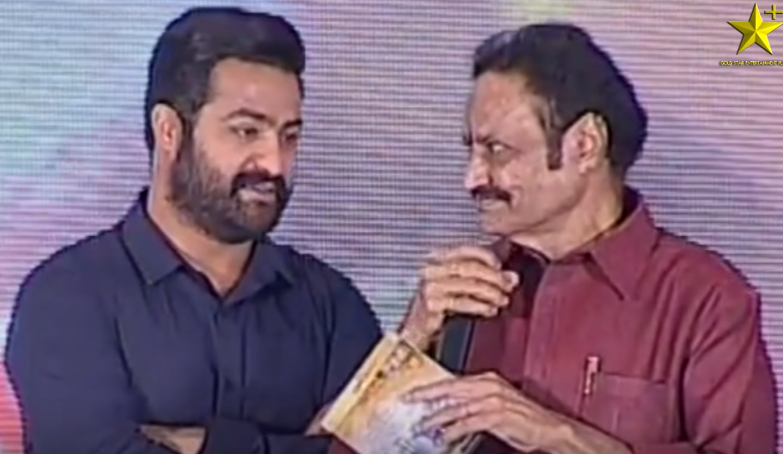
N. T. Rama Rao Jr. with his father Nandamuri Harikrishna at the film's audio launch

After the success of Janatha Garage (2016), N. T. Rama Rao Jr., signed his next project tentatively titled #NTR27, (Note: 27th film of N. T. Rama Rao Jr. as the lead actor) under the direction of screenwriter Vakkantham Vamsi, marking his debut as a film director and to be produced by his family banner N. T. R. Arts. Although the project was eventually announced on 20 May 2016 (which coincided with Jr. NTR's birthday), in September 2016, sources stated that the project was shelved after the actor was not satisfied with the script. In October 2016, reports had stated that Anil Ravipudi will direct #NTR27, as he was keen to direct Jr. NTR. A Behindwoods article report stated that he had earlier discussed a story in which NTR was to play a blind person which didn't work out, but the actor seemed keen to work with Anil and asked him to come up with another script, for which he immediately came up with a new idea. However, on 26 December 2016, Nandamuri Kalyan Ram took to Twitter to announce that #NTR27 will be directed by K. S. Ravindra. Kalyan Ram stated that he will produce the film under the home banner N. T. R. Arts, which will be made on a huge scale, and he also planned to hire top technicians in order to get very best product in technical standards and production values.

=== Casting ===
In February 2017, Raashii Khanna was signed to play the lead actress opposite Jr. NTR and a source revealed that her role will have huge importance in the film. On 25 March 2017, Hamsa Nandini was signed to play a cameo appearance in the film, whereas the same month, Nivetha Thomas of Gentleman fame was signed to play the second female lead. Samantha Akkineni was initially added to the cast as one of the three female leads, and reports stated that she will play a negative role, although she turned down the offer. On 21 April 2017, Nanditha Raj was added to the cast to play a special cameo in the film. Priyadarshi Pullikonda confirmed his inclusion in the film and stated that he shot for three days.

In April 2017, the makers decided to rope in Kannada actor Duniya Vijay, as the main antagonist, and offered a call sheet to complete his portions with in 15 days. While the actor was banned by the Karnataka Film Chamber of Commerce, due to the freak accident held at the sets of Maasthi Gudi (2017) claimed the lives of two stuntmen. The makers hired Bollywood actor Ronit Roy to play the antagonist, marking his debut in Telugu film industry.

=== Crew ===
The team initially hired C. K. Muraleedharan to handle the cinematography for the film, however due to creative differences, the makers replaced him with Chota K. Naidu after Muraleedharaan opted out of the project. Devi Sri Prasad was hired to score the music, while A. S. Prakash was assigned as the art director.

In April 2017, the production house announced that the Hollywood prosthetics and Legacy Effects expert Vance Hartwell who earlier worked in movies like Lord of the Rings trilogy, Enthiran (2010), Iron Man (2008) and Shutter Island (2010), was signed to take care of NTR's look in the movie, and was flown down from Los Angeles to take the measurement for a facial mask, in which NTR would play three characters in the film. Anil Paduri of Advitha Creative Studios was hired as the visual effects supervisor.

=== Filming ===
The film was formally launched in Hyderabad on 10 February 2017, at the new office of N. T. R. Arts. The ceremony was attended by Nandamuri Harikrishna, Nandamuri Ramakrishna, V.V. Vinayak, Dil Raju, Shirish, B. V. S. N. Prasad, Yalamanchili Ravi, Kilaru Sitish, S. Radha Krishna, Suryadevara Naga Vamsi and others. The honorary clap was given by Jr. NTR while the camera was switched on by Nandamuri Harikrishna. Director V.V. Vinayak directed the first shot, which was picturised on the photos of deities.

Principal photography began in February 2017 in Hyderabad while Jr. NTR joined the sets in the mid of March. A wedding scene between the lead pair NTR and Raashi Khanna was picturized in the surrounding area of Chilkur. Actor Priyadarshi also joined this shoot. Nandamuri Harikrishna, father of Jr. NTR and Kalyan Ram, visited the shooting spot in latter half of March and a picture of him on the sets revealed that one of the characters played by Jr. NTR is a bank manager named "N. Lava Kumar". The team spent ₹2 crore (US$210,000) to erect a massive set at Ramoji Film City where a major portion of filming took place. Bollywood actor Ronit Roy joined the shoot in the mid June 2017 and some action sequences were shot in a stone quarry in Hyderabad.

The shooting of the film got further delayed, after Jr. NTR was hired to host for the Telugu version of Bigg Boss Season 1 for Star Maa. The film's second schedule in Pune was held on 26 July 2017, were a couple of songs and scenes were shot accordingly, which was expected to take place for 20 days. On the first day of the schedule, Tarak changed 42 different costumes for 13 scenes, all being shot in a single day, which impressed the film's crew members. The film's major portion of shooting was completed on 15 August, excluding for three songs, with NTR started dubbing for his portions ofn 22 August. On 28 August, Tamannaah Bhatia was hired for a special number, which was shot in a single day. The shooting finished in September 2017.

== Music ==
The film's music is composed by Devi Sri Prasad, with lyrics written by Chandrabose and Ramajogayya Sastry. The soundtrack was released as a soft launch with a formal press meet on 3 September 2016, after plans for a grand event being cancelled. The album was directly released online through Lahari Music.

== Release ==
Initially planned for a Dusshera release, Jai Lava Kusa was scheduled for a worldwide theatrical release ahead of the Dusshera festival, on 21 September 2017, and also coinciding with the day of Navratri. The film was released in more than 4000 screens, marking it the second highest release for a Telugu film after Baahubali 2: The Conclusion, and also the biggest release in Jr. NTR's career. The film opened in 975 screens in Andhra Pradesh and Telangana, 225 screens in Karnataka and other parts of India, 190 screens in the US and 162 screens in the UK, Gulf, Australia, Germany and other international markets. The film released earlier on United States on 20 September, where it was premiered in more than 70 locations.

=== Marketing ===
On the occasion of Sri Rama Navami (5 April 2017), the makers announced the title of the movie as Jai Lava Kusa.

The pre-release event was held on 10 September 2017, at a grand ceremony held at Shilpakala Vedika in Hyderabad. The film's theatrical trailer was released on the same day, and crossed 3 million views within 24 hours.

=== Pre-release revenue ===
The theatrical rights in the Nizam region were sold to ₹21.2 crore (US$2.3 million), whereas the Ceded theatrical rights were sold to ₹12.6 crore (US$1.3 million). In the Uttar Andhra region, the film made a business of ₹8 crore (US$850,000) before release. The theatrical rights of both Guntur & Krishna regions were sold to ₹12.6 crore (US$1.3 million). The business in the Godavari East and West regions, were of ₹5.7 crore (US$610,000) and ₹4.5 crore (US$480,000). The theatrical rights in the Nellore region were sold to ₹2.9 crore (US$310,000). Thus the film earned ₹67.5 crore (US$7.2 million), from the theatrical rights in Andhra Pradesh and Telangana. The film earned more than ₹86 crore (US$9.2 million) in the worldwide theatrical rights, which includes Karnataka for ₹8.2 crore (US$880,000), Tamil Nadu for ₹1 crore (US$110,000), Rest of India (excluding Kerala) for ₹0.8 crore (US$85,000) and overseas theatrical rights for ₹8.5 crore (US$910,000). The distribution rights were not finalized in Vizag, as there were no buyers for the film.

The film made a pre-release business of ₹112.5 crore (US$12 million), with satellite rights being sold to ₹14.6 crore (US$1.6 million), Hindi dubbing rights for ₹10.9 crore (US$1.2 million) and audio rights for ₹1 crore (US$110,000).

=== Controversies ===
In the end of June 2017, a couple of leaked stills and a teaser from the movie surfaced online and went viral on the internet. The production house was upset over the matter and requested the fans not to share them on the social media. Some of the culprits were later identified and arrested. It was later revealed that the teaser was not the finalized one and it was just a rough cut. A man named Ganesh was arrested on the charges of leaking the teaser online. Producer Kalyan Ram approached the cybercrime department and lodged a complaint over this issue.

In July 2017, there were reports claimed that the script of the film was stolen from director Puri Jagannadh. It was initially proposed that Puri and Jr NTR were supposed to do a film together and had discussed a similar character during their meeting last December. While the film was expected to be made on a huge scale the makers, but it didn't materialise following certain creative differences, as Jr. NTR had liked the script, but wanted a few changes to the background story, whereas Puri didn't agree with him and said. A source from the film's team claimed that, "When Puri watched the first teaser of the film, which released on 6 July 2017, he realised that the Jai's characterisation is exactly what he had proposed to Jr NTR for their film. Since his main plot has already been stolen, Puri cannot go ahead and make the film. He will have to scrap the story, which was supposed to translate into a ₹100 crore film."

=== Home media ===
The satellite rights of the film were sold to Gemini TV for ₹14.6 crore (US$1.6 million), whereas the Hindi dubbing satellite rights of the film were sold to Zee Network for ₹10.9 crore (US$1.2 million). The film had a television premiere on 13 January 2018, ahead of Sankranthi, and registered a TRP rating of 17.7 in the first premiere. The Hindi dubbed version titled The Power of 3 - Jai Luv Kush was premiered on Zee Cinema on 13 May 2018.

== Reception ==
=== Critical reception ===
The film opened to positive response from critics. Sridhar Adivi of The Times of India gave 3.5 out of 5 stars stating "Jai Lava Kusa has everything that one expects in a star film — comedy, action, drama, romance, etc. Box-office revenues apart, Jr NTR has once again proved with this film what a fine actor he is." Srivatsan of India Today gave the film a rating of 3 out of 5 and stated "Jai Lava Kusa is yet another star vehicle that begins on a rather high note." Sangeetha Devi Dundoo of The Hindu stated "Jai Lava Kusa gets predictable and even melodramatic, but NTR holds it together with a class act." 123Telugu gave 3.25 out of 5 stating "Jai Lava Kusa is NTR's one-man show".

Writing for The Indian Express, Manoj Kumar R. gave 3 out of 5 stating "First and major reason not to give Jai Lava Kusa a miss this weekend is the fact that for the first time fans will get to see Jr NTR play a triple role. Jr NTR has excelled at performing all three roles, while effortlessly switching between Jai, Lava and Kusa showing the stark contract in their characters." Hemanth Kumar of Firstpost gave 3 out of 5 stating "There are, in fact, three reasons to watch the film: NTR, NTR, NTR. Perhaps there's no other film in recent times which celebrates an actor to this extent, and it expects us to do the same. Because beyond this, nothing else seems to matter." Karthik Keramalu of Hindustan Times gave the film 3 out of 5 and stated "Jai Lava Kusa works when it brings the emotional angle of the brothers to forefront and this is the angle we wish was exploited more effectively."

The New Indian Express gave the film 3 out of 5 stating "Jai Lava Kusa draws its prowess from NTR who pulls off three contrasting roles with great fervour and enthusiasm." Vikram Venkateshwaran of Bloomberg Quint reviewed it as "Jai Lava Kusa, at almost three hours is almost completely devoid of lags, and runs through like a breeze. It's NTR Jr all the way through till the end. And for the price of one ticket, you get three heroes, all fully fleshed out. And that, is one heck of a weekend deal." Sowmya Rajendran of The News Minute reviewed "Jai Lava Kusa is Junior NTR all the way and he lives up to the massive expectations." Suresh Kavirayani of Deccan Chronicle gave 3 out of 5 and stated "Jai Lava Kusa is a good film, conceptually, but the director has only been partially successful in executing his vision. Jr NTR's powerful performances make this film worth a watch for his fans."

In contrast, Behindwoods gave the film a rating of 2.25 out of 5 stating "Tarak's supreme efforts gone in vain!!! A missed opportunity". Indiaglitz gave the film 2.75 out of 5 and stated "JLK is NTR's show, lock, stock, and barrel. The story line is decent. The screenplay has its share of flaws and the first half is underwhelming. The climax fight should have been much better. The emotional content (read the brotherly sentiment) could help the film sail through." Sify gave 2.75 out of 5 stating "Jai Lava Kusa is Jr NTR's show totally from the first episode to the last scene. In particularly he has shown his acting caliber once again in the role of Jai. But the movie has uneven narration - some parts are good, some are cliched."

=== Box office ===
==== India ====
Jai Lava Kusa earned ₹32.10 crore in the opening day from the Telugu states, and collected ₹46.6 crore worldwide. The film earned ₹25 crore in the second day, taking its total collections up to second day, to ₹71 crore. The film's opening weekend collection stood at ₹90.3 crore. At the sixth day, the film collected more than ₹103 crore. According to The Times of India, the film's grossed ₹129 crore in two weeks. The film earned a share of ₹57.79 crore to its distributors across Telugu states. The film completed 50-day theatrical run in 12 centres.

==== Overseas ====
Jai Lava Kusa earned $589,000 from its premiere shows in the United States, breaking the opening record of Janatha Garage (2016), which earned $584,000. As of 2 October, the film earned $1.5 million at the US box office.
