= Kalyanram Kathi =

2010 action film directed by Mallikarjun

Kalyan Ram Kathi
- Movie poster
- Directed by: Mallikarjun
- Written by: Screenplay: Mallikarjun; Story: Vakkantham Vamsi; Dialogues: M. Ratnam
- Produced by: Nandamuri Kalyan Ram
- Starring: Kalyan Ram; Sana Khan
- Cinematography: Sarvesh Murari
- Edited by: Gautham Raju
- Music by: Mani Sharma
- Production company: N.T.R. Arts
- Release date: 12 November 2010
- Running time: 129 minutes
- Country: India
- Language: Telugu

Kalyan Ram Kathi, also known as Kathi (transl. Sword), is a 2010 Indian Telugu-language action film written and directed by Mallikarjun. It stars Kalyan Ram in the lead role, alongside Sana Khan, Shaam, Saranya Mohan and Kota Srinivasa Rao. The story was written by Vakkantham Vamsi, while Mallikarjun wrote the screenplay. The film features music composed by Mani Sharma. It also marks the second collaboration between Kalyan Ram and Mallikarjun after Abhimanyu, along with the Telugu debut of Sana Khan. The narrative revolves around a football player who unleashes his violent side when his sister goes missing.

Prior to its release, the film became embroiled in a controversy regarding the title, which was registered by director Gunasekhar for a film he was going to make with Ravi Teja. The title was changed from Kathi to Kalyan Ram Kathi, following which Gunasekhar gave up the title.

The film released on 12 November 2010. It was a commercial failure.

== Plot ==
The film opens with the protagonist killing some men and then proceeding to get stabbed by a man who thinks he murdered his wife.

The flashback unfolds, revealing the protagonist Ramakrishna to be a football player who loves his sister Haritha dearly. He is protective towards her despite her carefree nature, something that is not liked by rest of his family members. One day, a builder approaches his father at their home to clear the land for the construction of a park. Ramakrishna peacefully convinces the builder and his henchmen to leave, and instead arrives at his house to settle the matter. The builder's goon incites him, resulting in a fight that leaves everyone wounded and Ramakrishna telling the builder the importance of family. Impressed, he visits Ramakrishna's home, and in front of everyone, apologizes and asks him to marry his daughter, and Haritha to marry his son. However, Ramakrishna loves Anjali, and the builder is enraged to find them together. He arrives at Ramakrishna's house and insults both Ramakrishna and Haritha, leading to a brawl which leaves Ramakrishna's father unconscious upon learning about Haritha's disappearance from the builder's son. Helpless, Ramakrishna starts searching for her and as days pass, he suspects a politician's son of kidnapping her, following which he proceeds to attack the politician, his goons and son, only to realize he's not involved in it. Ramakrishna is arrested and then bailed by his family members who ask him to stop searching for Haritha, leave the city and fulfill his dream of playing the nationals.

At the railway station, Haritha, now a married woman, is thrown out of a train and is chased by a man named Krishna Mohan and his goons, only to be saved by Ramakrishna himself who escapes with her in a train. Haritha reveals she slapped a man who misbehaved with her, but seeing his loyalty towards her, fell for him. She didn't want to marry the builder's son and thus eloped with the man who married her but showed his true colors when her in-laws revealed revenge to be the reason of the marriage. Ramakrishna devises a plan as per which he takes Haritha back to her in-laws in Rayalaseema and wins their trust, especially that of his sister's father in law when he tells his sole mission is to kill his rival. Ramakrishna's second plan is to bring together Haritha and Krishna, which doesn't work initially but starts to, with time when Ramakrishna is joined by Anjali who turns out to be Krishna's sister. Krishna's brother returns and starts mistreating everyone including Ramakrishna, who beats him up publicly when he harasses Haritha.

Realizing that Krishna is now starting to change, his father instructs Ramakrishna to kill Haritha. Upon not finding her at home, Krishna becomes worried and upon learning the truth from his father, he confronts him verbally and threatens to not spare him. The opening scene is resumed when Ramakrishna returns with a sword, tells that he killed someone and is stabbed by an enraged Krishna. He threatens everyone to not save Ramakrishna and drags the latter to the gate. However, Krishna's father's rival arrives with his henchmen. Still angry as his sons were murdered, he attacks everyone and tries to kill Krishna, but is stopped by Ramakrishna who fights off the goons. He locks Krishna's father inside a room for his safety, and proceeds to confront the rival who gets killed in an explosion. Krishna's father starts believing Ramakrishna and Krishna too died due to him, while Krishna is found to be alive and living happily with his family, that now also includes Krishna.

== Cast ==
- Kalyan Ram as Ramakrishna
- Sana Khan as Anjali
- Saranya Mohan as Haritha
- Shaam as Krishna Mohan (voice dubbed by P. Ravi Shankar)
- Giri Babu as Rama Chandra Murthy, Haritha and Anjali's father
- Chandra Mohan as Chandram, Ramakrishna's father
- Ramya Krishna as Raja Lakshmi, Ramakrishna's mother
- Suhasini Maniratnam as Snehalatha, Haritha and Anjali's mother
- Kota Srinivasa Rao as Bilahari, Krishna Mohan's father
- Ahuti Prasad as Babai
- Brahmanandam as Swathi Muthyam
- Ajay as Ajay, Krishna Mohan's family member
- Telangana Shakuntala as Shakuntala, Krishna Mohan's mother
- Venu Madhav as Venu, Ramakrishna's friend
- Raghu Babu as Auto Driver Baasha
- Sameer Hasan as Ramakrishna's elder brother
- Satya Krishnan as Ramakrishna's sister-in-law
- Jhansi as Sridevi, a maid at Ramakrishna's house
- Raghu Karumanchi as Babai's henchman
- Dharmavarapu Subramanyam as Subramanyam
- Ramaraju

== Soundtrack ==
The music was composed by Mani Sharma and released by Mayuri Audio label. The audio launch event took place on 6 November 2010 at Taj Banjara hotel. It was attended by celebrities such as Dasari Narayana Rao, Nandamuri Harikrishna, Nandamuri Balakrishna, Jr. NTR, Janakiram, Taraka Ratna, Shaam, Kota Srinivasa Rao, Sana Khan, Mallikarjun, Gautam Raju, Vakkantham Vamsi, RP Patnaik, Srivas and Raghu Babu.

Kalyanram Kathi

Soundtrack album by Mani Sharma
- Released: 2010
- Recorded: 2010
- Genre: Soundtrack
- Length: 19:08
- Label: Mayuri Audio
- Producer: Mani Sharma

Mani Sharma chronology
Khaleja (2010)	Kalyanram Kathi (2010)	Parama Veera Chakra (2011)

Track-List
No.	Title	Lyrics	Singer(s)	Length
1.	"Jai Jai Ram"	Ramajogayya Sastry	Vijay Yesudas	4:18
2.	"Yemi Debbaro"	Ramajogayya Sastry	Muralidhar	4:01
3.	"Naatu Kodi Koora"	Bandaru Danayya	Hema Chandra, Geetha Madhuri	4:06
4.	"Yemavutundhi Gundelo"	Balaji	Sreerama Chandra	4:15
5.	"Theme Of Kalyanram Kathi" (Instrumental)			02:28
Total length:				19:08

== Reception ==
The Times of India gave the film two out of five stars and stated that "The contrived plot could play spoilsport in this clichéd action adventure". Idlebrain.com gave the film 3 stars out of 5 and praised Kalyan Ram's performance, action sequences, dialogues and camerawork.
