= Hare Ram =

2008 Indian Telugu-language action thriller film

- Theatrical release poster
- Directed by: Harshavardhan
- Written by: Gowri Shankar
- Produced by: Kalyan Ram
- Starring: Kalyan Ram; Priyamani; Sindhu Tolani
- Narrated by: Swamiji-Vijay
- Cinematography: C. Ramprasad
- Edited by: Gautham Raju
- Music by: Mickey J. Meyer
- Production company: N.T.R. Arts
- Release date: 18 July 2008
- Running time: 157 minutes
- Country: India
- Language: Telugu

Hare Ram is a 2008 Indian Telugu-language action thriller film directed by Harshavardhan, and produced by Kalyan Ram, under N.T.R. Arts. It stars Kalyan Ram in a dual role, along with Priyamani, Sindhu Tolani, Brahmanandam, Kota Srinivasa Rao, Ali and Raghu Babu. Mickey J Meyer composed the music, C. Ram Prasad handled the cinematography, and Gautam Raju edited the film. The action sequences were choreographed by Stunt Silva and Ram-Lakshman.

The narrative revolves around a conflict between Hari and Ram, conjoined twins separated at birth. When their parents part ways, Hari grows up to become an honest cop while Ram becomes a mentally unstable and violent man ready to kill anyone smarter than him, including his own brother. When Ram's killing spree begins, Hari takes charge and decides to arrest him within 24 hours or lose his job at the 25th hour.

The film was released on 18 July 2008 and became a commercial success. In 2011, it was dubbed into Hindi-language as Julmo Ka Tandav (transl. Orgy of cruelties) and in Odia under the same name. Later in an interview for his 2013 action thriller Om 3D, Kalyan Ram revealed Hare Ram to be the first Telugu-language film to make use of a flycam.

== Plot ==
Hari is an IPS officer who is busy investigating the murders of a news reporter Rajeev and a well-known doctor GK Reddy. He discovers that his twin Ram had committed the murders.

In a flashback, Ram has a problem with his brain and sometimes cannot control his emotions, which makes him act like a beast. He would not even hesitate to kill and does not like anyone praising or belittling him. In this process, he builds a grudge against his own brother, who is good at everything and tries to kill him right during their childhood. Their mother cannot tolerate all this and takes it upon herself to change Ram, so she takes him away from Hari to avoid further hatred, but Ram's nature does not change even after they grow up. Meanwhile, Hari is often chased by Anjali, who poses as a bank employee but is actually a CBI officer who comes to arrest him since she suspects his hand in the killings. GK Reddy happens to be the younger brother of the health minister Siva Reddy, and from then on, Siva Reddy is closely on the heels of the killer. Anjali finally manages to arrest Hari, and soon she realizes her folly when she chances upon his mother and understands the entire story of Hari and Ram.

Ram is initially thought to have committed the murders. A twist occurs: Sravani, a journalist and Ram's love interest, was jointly killed by Rajeev and Siva Reddy when she exposes their plans of running a health mafia. Ram attacked GK Reddy to seek revenge. GK Reddy injected Ram with the deadly virus, and Ram, deciding to sacrifice himself to save the people around him, fell under Hari's car. He then asked Hari to shoot him to save the others; with no other alternative left, Hari did so. Hari then decided to kill the culprits by impersonating Ram. Hari is released from jail by the court for the purpose of catching them. He then kidnaps Siva Reddy in a van and takes him to a lonely place. When the policemen and the others gather there, Hari escapes from the van via the sewage pipe and gets into the public. He then triggers a bomb in the van. Ram's mother thinks Ram sacrificed his life for the country and feels proud of him. The film ends with Hari explaining to the taxi driver Nijam how he escaped from CBI custody.

== Cast ==
- Nandamuri Kalyan Ram in a dual role as
- ACP Hari Krishna IPS
- Rama Krishna
- Priyamani as Anjali
- Sindhu Tolani as Sravani
- Kota Srinivasa Rao as Health Minister G. Siva Reddy
- Rajeev Kanakala as Dr. GK Reddy
- ETV Prabhakar as Rajeev
- Chandra Mohan as Chandram, Hari & Ram's father
- Seetha as Vasundhara, Hari & Ram's mother
- Sudha as Janaki, Hari's aunt
- Chalapathi Rao as Krishnam Raju, Hari's uncle
- Brahmanandam as Nijam, taxi driver
- Ali as Manager of OCOC Bank
- Kolla Ashok Kumar as Rajeev's brother
- Raghu Babu as Police Officer
- Venu Madhav as Car Thief
- Lakshmipathi as Siva Reddy's assistant
- Raghu Karumanchi as Raghu
- Ranganath as Dr. Naidu
- Shankar Melkote as Melkote
- Fish Venkat as Bald Head
- Vizag Prasad as DGP Ravindranath
- Apoorva as Bhagyam
- Ambati Srinivas as Waiter

== Soundtrack ==
The music was composed by Mickey J. Meyer and released by Mayuri Audio.

Hare Ram

Soundtrack album by Mickey J. Meyer
- Released: 2008
- Recorded: 2008
- Genre: Soundtrack
- Length: 25:07
- Label: Mayuri Audio
- Producer: Mickey J. Meyer

Mickey J. Meyer chronology
Happy Days (2007)	Hare Ram (2008)	Kotha Bangaru Lokam (2008)

All tracks are written by Sirivennela Seetharama Sastry.

Track-List
No.	Title	Singer(s)	Length
1.	"Nasha"	Sunitha Sarathy, Ranjith	4:09
2.	"Sariga Padani"	Karthik	5:06
3.	"Yakhuda Zara Dekho Na"	Harish Raghavendra, Kalyani	4:46
4.	"Jairam Jairam"	Mickey J. Meyer	3:37
5.	"Lalijo"	Karthik, Harini	4:41
6.	"The Theme Music of Hare Ram" (Instrumental)	Balaji, Vasu, Srinivas	2:48
Total length:			25:07

== Home media ==
Hare Ram is currently streaming on Aha.
