= Sarvesh Murari =

Indian cinematographer

- Born: Andhra Pradesh, India
- Occupation: Cinematographer

Sarvesh Murari is an Indian cinematographer, who has worked in the Telugu and Tamil film industries.

== Career ==
Sarvesh Murari is a cinematographer who has predominantly worked on for Telugu films. He started his career as camera assistant and worked for films including Family Circus and Nuvvu Nenu, under Rasool Ellore, and Aithe, under K.K. Senthil Kumar. His first movie as the director of photography was Anukokunda Oka Roju (2005) directed by Chandra Sekhar Yeleti, and received a further breakthrough following his work as the cinematographer of S. S. Rajamouli's Vikramarkudu (2006). Sarvesh Murari also notably worked as a second unit cameraman for Arundhathi (2009), before branching into Tamil films in 2017 with two films featuring Raghava Lawrence.

In January 2016, he announced his intentions of working as a director in the future.

== Filmography ==
=== As cinematographer ===
| Movie | Year | Language | Notes |
|---|---|---|---|
| 2005 | Anukokunda Oka Roju | Telugu | |
| 2006 | Shock | Telugu | |
| 2006 | Vikramarkudu | Telugu | |
| 2007 | Nava Vasantham | Telugu | |
| 2008 | Ontari | Telugu | |
| 2009 | Prayanam | Telugu | |
| 2009 | Kurradu | Telugu | |
| 2010 | Kedi | Telugu | |
| 2010 | Kalyanram Kathi | Telugu | |
| 2010 | Ragada | Telugu | |
| 2012 | Nippu | Telugu | |
| 2013 | Action 3D | Telugu | |
| 2013 | Doosukeltha | Telugu | |
| 2015 | Pataas | Telugu | |
| 2015 | Sher | Telugu | |
| 2017 | Motta Shiva Ketta Shiva | Tamil | |
| 2017 | Shivalinga | Tamil | |
| 2017 | Ungarala Rambabu | Telugu | |
| 2018 | Gayatri | Telugu | |
| 2019 | Pottu | Tamil | |
| 2019 | Kanchana 3 | Tamil | |
| 2022 | Son of India | Telugu | |
