= Motta Shiva Ketta Shiva =

2017 Indian film by Sai Ramani

- Theatrical release poster
- Directed by: Sai Ramani
- Screenplay by: Sai Ramani
- Story by: Anil Ravipudi
- Based on: Pataas by Anil Ravipudi
- Produced by: R. B. Choudary
- Starring: Raghava Lawrence; Nikki Galrani
- Cinematography: Sarvesh Murari
- Edited by: Praveen K. L.
- Music by: Amresh Ganesh
- Production company: Super Good Films
- Distributed by: Sivabalan Pictures; Vendhar Movies
- Release date: 9 March 2017
- Running time: 152 minutes
- Country: India
- Language: Tamil

Motta Shiva Ketta Shiva (transl. Shiva is Bald and Badass) is 2017 Indian Tamil-language action comedy film written and directed by Sai Ramani. The film stars Raghava Lawrence and Nikki Galrani, while Sathyaraj and Ashutosh Rana play supporting roles. It is a remake of the 2015 Telugu film Pataas with Ashutosh Rana reprising his role from the original. The music was composed by Amresh Ganesh with editing done by Praveen K. L. and cinematography by Sarvesh Murari. The film was released on 9 March 2017 and received mixed reviews.

== Plot ==
ACP Shivakumar IPS is a corrupt police officer who saves the Central Minister in the forest from terrorists and is transferred to Chennai and misuses his power to gain money through unorthodox processes. During this process, he encourages an MP named GK, who has become a headache to Kirubakaran, the Police Commissioner of Chennai. In a shocking revelation by GK, Shiva is Kiruba's son, who is angry at the latter as his supposed negligence killed his mother and unborn sister. However, Kiruba actually left his wife in the hospital to save several children in a terrorist attack. Unaware of this, Shiva left Kiruba, joined an orphanage, and became an corrupt IPS officer to seek revenge on him.

During his time in Chennai, Shiva meets Jaanu, a journalist at Sun News, and Nithya, a deaf-mute girl who works at a coffee shop. Shiva loves Jaanu and expects her to reciprocate the same, however, she rejects him because of his corrupt nature. GK's brother, Sanjay, and his friends gang-raped and brutally killed Nithya when she tried to save a techie from being sexually assaulted near HITEC City. Nithya's death an enraged Shiva, so he turns against GK.

GK wants to make Sanjay a politician, and Shiva challenges GK to save Sanjay from getting arrested. GK manages to kidnap the techie, but with the help of a transgender woman who witnessed Nithya's murder. Shiva arrests Sanjay with a non-bailable arrest warrant and challenges GK to bring Sanjay out of jail within three days. Shiva then manages to enter Shere Khan's area and arrest GK's brother's friends. Meanwhile, Kiruba and Shiva are reunited, and Shiva's marriage to Jaanu is approved. On the third day, GK's henchmen kidnap the transgender woman and Jaanu. Shiva and his team go to the spot to save the witness. However, Shiva could not rescue the transgender woman, as the kidnappers killed her.

Shiva receives a call from GK, who says that he has kidnapped Jaanu and Kiruba and challenges Shiva to save them by bringing Sanjay to him. GK becames enraged and the kills Kiruba and Shiva's team. Meanwhile, Shiva murders them using Nithya's brother shortly after their release from jail. Shiva reaches the spot after tracing Kiruba's GPS signal. On arriving, he finds Kiruba dead and Jaanu attached to a bomb. After a long fight, Shiva kills GK's henchmen and saves Jaanu. At that time, Shiva's service vehicle and the police reached there. Shiva throws GK and his partners into the van. He pours petrol onto the ambulance. Shiva shoots the van, and they die in the blast. Kiruba gets admitted to the hospital.

Shiva discovers he is still alive because he can hear his heart beating. Shiva reunites with Kiruba once more.

== Cast ==
- Raghava Lawrence as ACP Shivakumar IPS alias Shiva
  - Kaakkaa Muttai Ramesh as young Shiva
- Nikki Galrani as Jaanu (voice dubbed by Savitha Reddy)
- Sathyaraj as Police Commissioner Kirubakaran IPS
- Ashutosh Rana as GK, a corrupt politician
- Sukanya as Kiruba's wife
- Devadarshini as Banu, Jaanu's sister
- Kovai Sarala as Vaijayanthi, Shiva's assistant
- VTV Ganesh as Shaktivel, Central Minister
- Sathish as Sathish
- Rajendran as Tsunami Star Subash
- Vamsi Krishna as Sanjay, GK's brother
- Thambi Ramaiah as Home Minister
- Sriman as Kasi
- Chaams as Chamu
- Pandu as Doctor
- Madhan Bob as Jaanu's brother-in-law, Banu's husband
- G. V. Kumar as GK's right-hand
- Charandeep as GK's henchman
- Manobala as GK's sidekick
- Anupama Kumar as Minister Abhirami
- Pavani Reddy as Shakthivel's daughter
- Ashwin Raja as Jaanu's colleague
- Mayilsamy
- Mahanadi Shankar
- Mukhtar Khan as Shere Khan, GK's friend
- Raai Laxmi in a special appearance as item in the "Hara Hara Mahadevaki" song

== Production ==
In April 2015, it was confirmed that producer R. B. Choudary had bought the Tamil remake rights of the Telugu film Pataas (2015). A month later, Raghava Lawrence confirmed himself as the lead actor. However, Lawrence stopped pre-production on the venture, and instead announced two new films as a director in August 2015. He revealed he planned to work with Vendhar Movies in a film titled Motta Shiva Ketta Shiva with Nikki Galrani, named after a dialogue from Kanchana 2. The other film announced was Naaga.

In November 2015, it was revealed that Lawrence would postpone his other films and begin work on the remake of Pataas with director Sai Ramani, who had earlier directed Singam Puli (2011). The remake later adopted the title Motta Shiva Ketta Shiva, after Vendhar Movies readily agreed to give the title away. Galrani was announced as the lead actress. Production began on 18 November. The film was predominantly shot throughout late 2015 and early 2016, and by March 2016, Lawrence revealed that only twenty more days of shoot were pending. By March 2016, production was mostly complete, barring the shoot of a few song sequences.

In March 2016, producer Madhan of Vendhar Movies disappeared after writing a suicide note. Madhan and Vendhar Movies' involvement in the project as a distributor meant that legal issues put the release of the film on hold, as police investigated Madhan's disappearance. Meanwhile, production continued and was completed with a song sequence shot in Malaysia in July 2016. Madhan was later arrested after being found to be hiding in Manipur, and following his capture, the film prepared for a theatrical release after the distribution rights were sold to Sivabalan Pictures. To ensure the release of the film, Lawrence sacrificed a large amount from his salary and also helped settle the deficit owed by Vendhar Movies.

== Soundtrack ==
Amresh Ganesh was signed to work on the music for the film, after he had impressed the director and producer with his sample tracks. Amresh, who had previously worked as an actor in films, also turned down an opportunity to act in the film. As a part of the album, he remixed the song "Aadaludan Paadalai Kettu Rasipadhile" from Kudiyirundha Koyil (1968) with new vocals by Shankar Mahadevan and Padmalatha. Amresh also convinced Raghava Lawrence to sing in the film and make his playback singing debut.

Prior to the release of the film, actor Tinku released a video alleging that Amresh had stolen a song titled "Hara Hara Mahadevaki" from a film that he and Robert were making titled Thaathaa Car-ai Thodadhae. Tinku alleged that Amresh had worked together with them to create the song during early 2015, but production troubles had shelved the film, and subsequently, Amresh had taken the song to a different project. In a press meet in February 2017, Amresh refuted the claims and provided evidence of Tinku and Robert continuously trying to scam him by gathering funds for the shelved project. Amresh stated that he had developed the song free of cost and had paid for the duo to take part in a failed shoot of the song in Bangkok, before the film was stalled. Moreover, Amresh revealed that Robert had owned up to playing the song to music composer Srikanth Deva, and had attempted to include it in another shelved film titled Minor Kunju Kaanom which Tinku, Robert and Srikanth Deva were involved in. The lyrics of the song were later edited for the film's theatrical release, with the title of "Ada Ada Maharanikki" in place of the original lyrics.

Track listing
No.	Title	Lyrics	Singer(s)	Length
1.	"Shiva Vechitanda Kaala"	Viveka	Shankar Mahadevan, Amresh Ganesh	4:44
2.	"Lo Lo Lo Local"	Viveka	Raghava Lawrence, Suchitra	4:28
3.	"Hara Hara Mahadevaki"	Sorkko	Amresh Ganesh, Padmalatha	4:45
4.	"Ivan Kaakhi Sattai"	Vairamuthu	Amresh Ganesh	4:15
5.	"Motta Paiyyan Paiyyan"	Sai Ramani	Raghava Lawrence, Suchitra	4:33
6.	"Adaludan Paadalai Kettu"	Alangudi Somu	Shankar Mahadevan, Padmalatha, Amresh Ganesh, Jack Styles	4:28
7.	"Mass ah Rough & Tough"	Viveka	Tippu, Malathi	3:48
Total length:				30:31

== Release ==
Motta Shiva Ketta Shiva was initially scheduled to be released in November 2016, before the producers planned a worldwide release date on 17 February 2017. In the weeks leading up to the film's release, Lawrence requested the producer of his other completed film Sivalinga to delay the release of that project, in order to accommodate the release of Motta Shiva Ketta Shiva. The film was then delayed by a further week to 24 February 2017, after the makers had to settle further legal settlements. Further postponements meant that Motta Shiva Ketta Shiva had a theatrical release on 9 March 2017.

== Reception ==
Upon release, the film received mixed reviews and did middling business at the box office. Vishal Menon of The Hindu stated that the film was a "mindless masala", while Anupama Subramanian of Deccan Chronicle wrote that "logic goes for a toss" in the film. Giving a negative review, Manoj Kumar R of The Indian Express called the film "mediocre with a nonsensical plot", adding it was "a sub-standard attempt by the filmmakers to glorify the police service, which ends up as a noisy hotch-potch". Likewise, Karthik Kumar from Hindustan Times wrote the film "is an annoyingly unbearable example of commercial cinema", concluding "this film is a blow to your sensibilities". Similarly Sify concluded "overall, Motta Shiva Ketta Shiva is nothing but a laboriously long, patience-testing exercise". A reference to Raghava Lawrence as the "Makkal Superstar" (People's Superstar) in the credits was also widely criticised, prompting the actor to release a statement distancing himself from the director's decision to apply such a moniker upon him.
