= Arjun Son of Vyjayanthi =

2025 Indian Telugu film

- Theatrical release poster
- Directed by: Pradeep Chilukuri
- Screenplay by: Pradeep Chilukuri; Srikanth Vissa
- Dialogues by: Srikanth Vissa
- Story by: Pradeep Chilukuri
- Produced by: Ashok Vardhan Muppa; Sunil Balusu; Nandamuri Kalyan Ram
- Starring: Nandamuri Kalyan Ram; Vijaya Shanthi; Sohail Khan
- Cinematography: C. Ram Prasad; Additional Cinematography: Prasad Murella
- Edited by: Tammiraju
- Music by: B. Ajaneesh Loknath
- Production companies: N. T. R. Arts; Ashoka Creations
- Release date: 18 April 2025
- Running time: 144 minutes
- Country: India
- Language: Telugu
- Box office: est.₹7.1 crore

Arjun Son of Vyjayanthi (stylized as Arjun S/O Vyjayanthi) is a 2025 Indian Telugu-language action drama film directed by Pradeep Chilukuri and produced by N. T. R. Arts and Ashoka Creations. The film stars Nandamuri Kalyan Ram and Vijayashanti, alongside Saiee Manjrekar, Sohail Khan, Babloo Prithiveeraj, Srikanth and R. Sarathkumar. The music was composed by B. Ajaneesh Lokanath, while cinematography and editing were handled by Ram Prasad and Tammiraju.

It is a spiritual sequel of 1990 film Karthavyam with Vijayshanti reprised the same role in this movie as Kalyan Ram's mother.

Arjun S/O Vyjayanthi was released on 18 April 2025 and received mixed reviews from critics.

== Synopsis ==
Arjun, an IPS aspirant-turned-kindhearted gangster, learns that Pathan, a notorious terrorist, wants to exact revenge on his mother Vyjayanthi, an honest IPS officer, where he sets out to protect Vyjayanthi.

== Plot ==
The film begins with Vyjayanthi, an honest and upright police officer who is ready to sacrifice her life for protecting the country. Her son Arjun who always wishes her on her birthday, comes with his father, a Navy Officer to wish her. But soon, they are stopped by Prakash, a colleague of Vyjayanthi since there was danger in the forest. During a crossfire with the goons, Vyjayanthi gets injured and taken to the hospital.

On the other hand in Mumbai , Gangster Nawab kidnaps his rival Muhammad Giyazuddin Pathan alias Pathan's sons. Pathan kills the

== Cast ==
- Nandamuri Kalyan Ram as Arjun Vishwanath
- Vijayashanti as Vyjayanthi IPS, Arjun's mother
- Sohail Khan as Mohammad Giyazuddin Pathan
- Saiee Manjrekar as Chitra, Arjun's wife
- Srikanth as Police Commissioner Prakash
- R. Sarathkumar as Sarath Chandra
- Babloo Prithiveeraj as P. Shivaji, Arjun's uncle
- Anand as Coast Guard Vishwanath, Arjun's father and Vyjayanthi's husband
- Bharath Reddy as Prakash's assistant
- B. S. Avinash as Mahankali
- Gayathri Bhargav as Villager
- Sundip Ved as Thangavel
- Vadlamani Srinivas as Police CI
- Naga Mahesh as Police SI

== Production ==
The film was initially referred to by its working title NKR21 and was officially launched with a muhurtham ceremony held in Hyderabad on 20 October 2023.

The first glimpse of the film, featuring Nandamuri Kalyan Ram, was unveiled by the makers. On 24 June 2024, a special birthday glimpse video featuring Vijayashanti was released by the makers. On 30 July 2024, the climax shoot was completed. A new shooting schedule for the film began in Visakhapatnam on 24 October 2024.

On 21 December 2024, the makers released a poster featuring Sohail Khan as the antagonist, marking his debut in Telugu cinema. On 8 March 2025, the official title of the film was announced as Arjun S/O Vyajayanthi. On 17 March 2025, the teaser of the film was released. The pre-release and trailer launch event of the film was held on 12 April 2025 at Shilpakala Vedika, with NTR as the chief guest.

== Music ==
The film's music is composed by B. Ajaneesh Loknath. On 31 March 2025, the first single, "Nayaaldhi," was released. The lyrics were written by Raghu Ram, and the song was sung by Nakash Aziz and Sony Komanduri. The second song of the film "Muchataga Bandhaale" was released on 9 April 2025, lyrics also written by Raghu Ram and Sung by Haricharan.

No.	Title	Lyrics	Singer(s)	Length
1.	"Nayaaldhi"	Raghu Ram	Nakash Aziz, Sony Komanduri	3:21
2.	"Muchataga Bandhaale"	Raghu Ram	Haricharan	3:40
3.	"Amma Nee Maate"	Raghu Ram	Raghu Ram	3:31
4.	"Adigo Vastunnadu"	Raghu Ram	Raghu Ram, Ritesh G Rao, Harshavardhan, Naresh Mamindla	4:17

== Release ==
Arjun S/o Vyjayanthi was released on 18 April 2025.

== Reception ==
Raisa Nasrren from Times Now rated 3/5 stars and stated "the film features action sequences and performances by Kalyan Ram and Vijaya Shanthi in key roles. While the action is a focal point, the writing has been noted as an area needing further development." Telugucinema.com wrote "Arjun S/O Vyjayanthi follows a conventional narrative structure, with the final twenty minutes and the presence of Vijayashanthi receiving particular attention." Aditya Devulapally of Cinema Express rated it 2 out of 5 and opined that the film falters in execution, and settles for adequacy. Sangeetha Devi Dundoo of The Hindu stated that the film "ends up as an outdated, curious saga of a mother, son and birthday cakes".
