= Ram Prasad (cinematographer) =

Indian cinematographer

- Born: C. Ram Prasad; 21 October 1966; India
- Occupation: Cinematographer
- Years active: 1986 – present
- Parent(s): Madhav Rao & Subbalakshmi

C. Ram Prasad is an Indian cinematographer who predominantly works in the Telugu films. He has done cinematography for more than 50 films. His notable works are Hanuman Junction (2001), Murari (2002), Athanokkade (2005), Maryada Ramanna (2010), Mirapakay (2011), Yevadu (2014), Legend (2014), Akhanda (2021), and Bhagavanth Kesari (2023).

== Early life ==
Prasad was born to the couple Madhav Rao and Subbalakshmi in 1965. His father was a makeup man and mother a homemaker. He spent his earlier years in Chennai. While his father inspired Prasad to make a decision about his career. After completing his SSLC, he joined the Film Institute in Chennai to pursue a Diploma in Cinematography (D.F.T.-Diploma in Film Technology). His passion for photography was so much that he dropped out of the institute to join as an assistant to cinematographer V. S. R. Swamy. He later moved to Hyderabad in 1992.

== Career ==
Prasad worked as an assistant cameraman in Telugu feature films from 1986 to 1988 and finally got his first break in the film Pacha Thoranam.

== Filmography ==
Key
†	Denotes films that have not yet been released

- All films in Telugu unless otherwise noted

Year	Title	Notes
1994	Pacha Thoranam	
1994	Police Alludu	
1997	Ayyinda Leda	
1997	Kaliyugamlo Gandargolam	
1997	Hello I Love You	
1998	Hyderabad Blues	English film
1998	Swarnakka	
1999	Nee Kosam	
1999	Prema Kosam	
1999	Rockford	English film
1999	Mysterious Girl	English-Hindi film
2000	Chala Bagundi	
2000	9 Nelalu	
2000	Naa Manasistha Raa	
2000	Sanchalanam	
2001	Murari	
2001	Hanuman Junction	
2001	Naa Manasistha Raa	
2002	Aadi	
2002	Manasutho	
2002	Kanulu Musina Neevaye	
2002	O Chinadana	
2003	Pellam Oorelithe	
2003	Jodi No. 1	
2003	Ottesi Cheputunna	
2003	Pellamtho Panenti	
2004	Sri Anjaneyam	
2004	Nenu	
2005	Athanokkade	
2005	Chakram	
2006	Pothe Poni	
2006	Veerabhadra	
2006	Evandoi Srivaru	
2007	Munna	
2007	Vijayadasami	
2008	Okka Magadu	
2008	Hare Ram	
2008	Hero	
2009	Saleem	
2010	Maryada Ramanna	
2011	Mirapakay	
2012	Rebel	
2014	Yevadu	
2014	Legend	
2015	Malini & Co.	
2015	Subramanyam For Sale	
2016	Jakkanna	
2016	Saptagiri Express	
2017	2 Countries	
2018	Jai Simha	
2019	Prema Katha Chitram 2	
2019	Burra Katha	
2019	RDX Love	
2019	Ruler	
2019	Software Sudheer	
2021	Idhe Maa Katha	
2021	Akhanda	
2022	Maayon	Tamil film
2022	Gaalodu	
2023	Organic Mama Hybrid Alludu	
2023	Bhagavanth Kesari	
2025	Arjun Son Of Vyjayanthi	
2025	Akhanda 2: Thaandavam	

== Awards and nominations ==
Award (Note: Awards, festivals and organizations are in alphabetical order.)	Year (Note: Date is linked to the article about the awards held that year, wherever possible.)	Category	Work	Result	Ref.
A.P. Cinegoers Award	2005	Best Cinematographer	Athanokkade	Won	
Nandi Awards	2007	Best Cinematographer	Munna	Won	
Sangam Academy Award	2004	Best Cinematographer	Nenu	Won	
Santosham Film Awards	2015	Best Cinematographer	Legend	Won	
Santosham Film Awards	2023	Best Cinematographer	Bhagavanth Kesari	Won	
South Indian International Movie Awards	2022	Best Cinematographer – Telugu	Akhanda	Won	
