= Kick 2 =

2015 Indian film by Surender Reddy

- Theatrical release poster
- Directed by: Surender Reddy
- Written by: Story & Dialogues: Vakkantham Vamsi; Screenplay: Surender Reddy
- Produced by: Nandamuri Kalyan Ram
- Starring: Ravi Teja; Rakul Preet Singh
- Cinematography: Manoj Paramahamsa
- Edited by: Gautham Raju
- Music by: S. S. Thaman
- Production company: N.T.R. Arts
- Distributed by: Classics Entertainments (overseas)
- Release date: 21 August 2015
- Running time: 161 minutes
- Country: India
- Language: Telugu
- Budget: ₹30 crore
- Box office: est. ₹43.5 crore

Kick 2 is a 2015 Indian Telugu-language action comedy film directed by Surender Reddy from a story written by Vakkantham Vamsi. It is produced by Nandamuri Kalyan Ram under the banner of N.T.R. Arts. A sequel to the 2009 film Kick, the film stars Ravi Teja in dual role as father and son, along with an ensemble cast including Rakul Preet Singh, Shaam, Ravi Kishan, Kabir Duhan Singh, Ashish Vidyarthi, Madhusudhan Rao, Brahmanandam, P. Ravishankar, Raghu Babu, Tanikella Bharani and Rajpal Yadav. with music composed by S. Thaman.

The film was officially launched on 20 August 2014, and the principal photography began on the same day. The audio soundtrack of the movie was composed by S. Thaman and was released on 9 May 2015. The film was released worldwide on 21 August 2015. The film performed poorly at the box office, grossing ₹43.5 crore (US$4.5 million) on a budget of ₹30 crore (US$3.1 million). The box office results were below average.

== Plot ==
The film opens with Kalyan Krishna arriving in Virginia to meet Kalyan, who has now married Naina and settled there. Kalyan tells Kalyan Krishna about the former’s son Robin Hood, who is completely contrasted in character as opposed to his father. Always looking for comfort in every aspect of life, Robin soon moves to Hyderabad to recover a plot of land belonging to his family that was grabbed by Settlement Durga. After challenging Durga that he will recover his land, Robin moves into the house of Pandit Ravi Teja, an astrologer who was behind Durga’s action of grabbing the land. Robin begins to make Pandit’s life miserable. An aspiring writer, Chaitra, is also smitten by Robin, and is rejected by him, who however poses the condition that if he falls in love with her anytime before he leaves for Virginia, he would stay back with her.

Meanwhile, a group of villagers from Vilaspur, a small town ruled by a ruthless landlord, Solomon Singh Thakur, are sent to follow Robin, who is believed to be the godsend who will save the village from the Thakur. Robin is successful in recovering his land, and minutes before his departure, realizes that he has caught feelings for Chaitra. He attempts to meet her but witnesses her get kidnapped by the villagers. A diary of hers reveals that she belonged to Vilaspur, prompting Robin to travel there to meet her. On arrival, the villagers stage a drama to ensure that Robin stays in Vilaspur for as long as possible and gets into a tussle with the Thakur. However, the attempts of the village is often belittled by one of the villagers, Venkataratnam, himself.

Thakur’s son, Munna arrives at Vilaspur, and in a state of intoxication kills a young girl, who was the daughter of one of the villagers. This is all hushed up in front of Robin to keep the drama going. Eventually, a misunderstanding comes up during a festival, leading to a duel between Munna and Robin. The former ends up in a coma, but is recovered by Robin himself, who challenges Thakur to get Munna to fight him a second time. Munna and Robin meet yet again, and Munna ends defeated once more. When he shows fright to face Robin a third time, Thakur kills his own son.

The entire village is taken hostage by the Thakur, which has been deserted by Robin, who has found out that the villagers were conning him. However, a change of heart at the railway station because of Venkataratnam causes Robin to come back for the villagers and face Thakur. In a turn of events, Thakur’s army is revealed to have turned against him for Robin, and in a final duel, Robin injures and subdues the Thakur, leaving his fate to the villagers. The latter is tied to a pole and is set on fire (a practice Thakur had commonly used on the villagers) and burnt alive. The film ends with Robin and Chaitra reuniting, and the announcement of a sequel, Kick 3.

== Cast ==
- Ravi Teja in a dual role as Robin Hood and Kalyan
- Rakul Preet Singh as Chaitra
- Ravi Kishan as Solomon Singh Thakur
- Brahmanandam as Pandit Ravi Teja
- Kabir Duhan Singh as Munna Thakur
- Ashish Vidyarthi as Settlement Durga
- Rajpal Yadav as Dunna
- Raghu Babu as Balwanth Singh Thakur
- Tanikella Bharani as Venkatratnam
- Posani Krishna Murali as Police commissioner
- Sameer Hasan as Journalist Rushendra
- Shekar as Chandan
- Kovai Sarala as Darling
- Shankar Melkote as Hollywood director
- Srinivasa Reddy as Suribabu
- Madhusudhan Rao as Jedcherla Balaram
- Sanjay Mishra
- Priyanka Nalkari as Kamala bhai's daughter
- Duvvasi Mohan
- Pruthvi Raj
- Raghu Karumanchi
- Chammak Chandra
- Appaji Ambarisha Darbha as Doctor
- Venu Yeldandi
- Chalaki Chanti as Chanti
- Vardhan
- Vandita as Munna Thakur's sister
- Shaam as Kalyan Krishna (Guest Appearance)
- Ileana D'Cruz as Naina (Cameo appearance)
- Surender Reddy as a guy sitting on bench beside Robin (Cameo appearance)
- Nora Fatehi as an item girl in item song "Kukkuruku Kick"

== Production ==
=== Development ===
After completing work on Race Gurram (2014), Surender Reddy wanted to make an experimental film which he later kept on hold and announced the sequel of Kick (2009), bankrolled by actor Nandamuri Kalyan Ram under the banner N.T.R. Arts, in late March 2014 when the script work was in its final stages. Reddy wanted its protagonist Ravi Teja to complete his work on Power (2014) before joining the shoot of the sequel, adding that this film, though a namesake sequel to Kick, would show Ravi Teja carrying some continuity from the prequel.

Vakkantham Vamsi, who wrote the script of the prequel, was confirmed to provide this film's story. Kalyan Ram tentatively titled the film as Kick 2 in late May 2014 with an intention of changing it after a month or so to avoid confusions if any. The film was launched officially on 20 August 2014 at Hyderabad with N. T. Rama Rao Jr. and Allu Arjun in attendance as the chief guests. Later, Ravi Teja revealed that the film's story will be about the son of the prequel's lead pair, adding that the sequel is just an extension of the prequel.

=== Casting ===
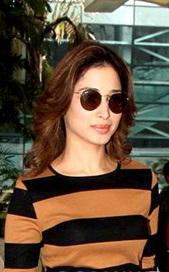
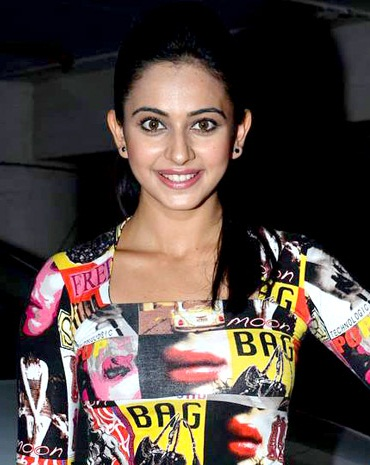
Tamannaah (left) was initially approached for female lead but due to scheduling conflicts, Singh (right) was cast

Surender Reddy wanted to select Tamannaah as the female lead. However, because of lack of dates, she rejected the offer as her dates were available only in August 2014. Later it was speculated that a new actress would be paired with Ravi Teja. The search for the lead actress was still going on after the film's launch. Rakul Preet Singh was confirmed as the heroine on 11 September 2014. It was reported that Ravi Teja would be seen playing a dual role as a father and son. Vikram Singh was selected as the antagonist. Sudeep was reported to be a part of the film who confirmed that Surender Reddy met him months ago for the same. Rajpal Yadav confirmed his inclusion on 10 November 2014 marking his Telugu debut. Rakul Preet Singh was reported to walk out from the project though Surender Reddy confirmed it to be a rumor later. Rakul Preet confirmed that she would be seen in two avatars - one being a city bred girl and the other being a Village belle. She clarified that she would not be seen in a dual role adding that she cannot reveal anything beyond that. Ravi Kishan was selected for a negative role, marking his second film in Tollywood industry with, director Surender Reddy again after Race Gurram. Vikram Singh who was cast as villain opted out of this project citing date issues. He said that he was upset going out of this movie and wished good luck for the film. Then, Chennai Express fame, Nikitin Dheer was considered for another villain role. Mumbai based model Kabir Duhan Singh was also signed in for another villain role who acts as a son to Ravi Kishan in the movie. Nora Fatehi has been signed to do a special song in the film. Top comedian Brahmanandam was reported to play an important role in the film. In late June 2015, it was known that Ravi Teja insisted director to take Sanjai Mishra into the film, marking his Telugu debut.

=== Filming ===
It was reported that the filming would start in June 2014. The principal photography started on 20 August 2014. Later, Telugu Film Industry Employees Federation served a strike notice to the Andhra Pradesh Film Chamber of Commerce demanding a 100% raise in their wages. The secretary of the Chamber held talks with them and it was reported that if they fail, the shootings of many films including this film would be halted. The filming continued after the strike was called off and few scenes on Ravi Teja and Rajpal Yadav were shot in Hyderabad in late November 2014. A Rajasthan village set costing ₹20 million was erected near Rajendra Nagar in the outskirts of Hyderabad on which ₹2 million was spent daily for shooting. The film was shot continuously for 66 hours in Hyderabad. By January 2015, 70% shooting was completed, said by director Surender Reddy in an interview to a leading daily newspaper Deccan Chronicle. The film was later shot extensively in Rajasthan and the film's climax was shot in Jaisalmer in late January 2015. Filming continued at Hampi in late January 2015 where a big schedule was planned there to shoot key scenes on whose completion, 90% of the filming would be completed. After completion of Hampi schedule filming began in Hyderabad Leading actor of this movie, Ravi Teja sheds 6 kg for a special role in this film. By shooting talkie part in February and March, shooting of two songs was started in Switzerland on 22 March 2015. This schedule was up to 31 March 2015. And by shooting another last song from 3 April 2015 in Annapurna Studios the shoot of talkie part including all the songs was completed.

== Soundtrack ==
Kick 2

Soundtrack album by S. Thaman
- Released: 9 May 2015
- Recorded: 2014–2015
- Genre: Feature film soundtrack
- Length: 23:12
- Language: Telugu
- Label: Junglee Music
- Producer: S. Thaman

S. Thaman chronology
Pandaga Chesko (2015)	Kick 2 (2015)	Sakalakala Vallavan (2015)

S. Thaman was selected as the film's music director and he began working on this film on 3 June 2014. The audio track list was released on 4 May 2015. New poster of the movie was released on 7 May 2015 announcing the audio date as 9 May 2015. The audio launch event took place at City Convention Center while actor N. T. Rama Rao Jr., younger brother of producer Nandamuri Kalyan Ram attended as chief guest and handed over the first audio CD to Ravi Teja.

It was reported that Thaman's background score (BGM) was mixed in Dolby Atmos. On 25 June 2015, Thaman wrapped up the tracking of the songs and was known that the background score (BGM) would be one of the highlights of the film.

Track list
No.	Title	Lyrics	Artist(s)	Length
1.	"Mummy"	Bhole	Bombay Bhole	3:46
2.	"Nuvve Nuvve"	Varikuppala Yadigiri	Jonita Gandhi, S. Thaman	4:13
3.	"Janda Pai Kapiraju"	Sri Mani	Divya Kumar, Jonita Gandhi, Rahul Nambiar, Deepak Blue, Nivas, Hanumanth Rao	4:57
4.	"Masthani Masthani"	Varikuppala Yadigiri	Deepak Blue, M. M. Manasi	4:26
5.	"Temple Song"	Sri Mani	Nivas, Rahul Nambiar, Sanjana, M. M. Monisha	2:04
6.	"Kick"	Kaasarla Shyam	Simha, Spoorthi	3:49
Total length:				23:12

== Release ==
The film was scheduled for a worldwide release on 7 May 2015. Later the makers announced the worldwide release date as 28 May 2015. But, as there was a delay in the film's post production, the release date has been pushed ahead. At the audio launch event, the film's worldwide release date was announced as 22 May 2015.

But due to delay in VFX department, the worldwide release date was pushed to July 2015. and director Surender Reddy was supervising all this post-production works continuously. Reports emerged in mid June 2015 that the movie will have its worldwide release date as 14 August 2015 though there was no official announcement. In late July 2015 the makers finally confirmed the worldwide release date as 21 August 2015.

=== Distribution ===
The film's overseas theatrical rights were sold to Classics Entertainments for an undisclosed high price in April 2015. European Telugu Colors bagged the distribution rights across Europe associating with Classics Entertainments.

=== Home media ===
Streaming rights of the film bagged by Sun NXT. The satellite rights bought by Gemini TV.

== Reception ==
=== Critical reception ===
The Times of India gave the film a rating of three out of five stars and wrote that "The first half of the film is enjoyable due to being high on emotions, laced with elements of fun, however, the pace slows in second half and so does the entertainment quotient". The Hindu wrote that "For those who like the Kick format, there’s an excess of everything". Deccan Chronicle gave the film a rating of three out of five stars and stated that "Kick 2 offers some entertainment here and there. It’s a typical Ravi Teja film with his mass dialogues and action, which attracts the front benchers". Sify gave the film a rating of two-and-three-quarter out of five and noted that "In one line, Kick 2 does not have the required kick nor does it provide any comfort to the audiences as it is long".

=== Box office ===
The film performed poorly at the box office, grossing ₹43.5 crore (US$4.5 million) worldwide, with ₹2.04 crore (US$307,000) of that from the United States.
