= Ism (film) =

2016 Indian film by Puri Jagannadh

- Theatrical release poster
- Directed by: Puri Jagannadh
- Written by: Puri Jagannadh
- Produced by: Nandamuri Kalyan Ram
- Starring: Nandamuri Kalyan Ram; Aditi Arya; Jagapati Babu
- Cinematography: Mukesh Gnanesh
- Edited by: Junaid Siddiqui
- Music by: Anup Rubens
- Production company: N. T. R. Arts
- Distributed by: Dil Raju
- Release date: 21 October 2016
- Running time: 130 minutes
- Country: India
- Language: Telugu
- Box office: est. ₹250 million

Ism is a 2016 Indian Telugu-language vigilante action film directed by Puri Jagannadh and produced by Nandamuri Kalyan Ram under N. T. R. Arts banner. The film stars Nandamuri Kalyan Ram, Aditi Arya and Jagapati Babu in the lead roles. Kalyan Ram's son Nandamuri Sourya Ram also makes his debut as a child artist, while Aditi Arya makes her debut in Telugu cinema. The music was composed by Anup Rubens, while the cinematography and editing were handled by Mukesh Gnanesh and Junaid Siddiqui.

The film was shot in August 2016 in Valencia, Spain.

Ism was released on 21 October 2016 to mixed reviews from critics and became an average grosser at the box office.

== Plot ==
Javed Ibrahim is a high-profile gangster who is in hiding on Tenerife with his gang and his daughter Alia, because several of his scams were exposed in India. Kalyan Ram happens to see her during a fight at an illegal fight club and falls head over heels for her. He even befriends Javed Bhai after offering him local Indian Karim Beedis. However, neither of them discloses their identities to each other. With the help of marriage broker Don Bosco, Javed Bhai gets Alia engaged to the Prince of Persia. Meanwhile, Javed Bhai helps Kalyan woo a girl he likes, unaware that the girl is his daughter. Alia slowly falls for Kalyan Ram, and informs Javed Bhai, who, realizing her lover is Kalyan, attempts to prove to her that he is cheating her. However, upon seeing them, Kalyan runs away and eventually jumps into the sea.

Meanwhile, in India, The Grand Leakage Company, a website/company, reveals Javed Bhai's whereabouts. By seeing through the plan, Javed Bhai and Alia realise that the company's founder, who has been unknown for years, is none other than Kalyan Ram. Alia, who is still madly in love with Kalyan Ram, runs away from the yacht and escapes to India. Meanwhile, Kalyan, whose real name is Sathya Marthand, is an undercover journalist whose father, Dasaradh Rao, was kidnapped by a criminal contractor when the former, a journalist, exposed the latter's use of faulty cement to construct buildings. Sathya, in retaliation, attempted to kill the contractor but realised that the idea of a crime is what encourages corruption. He, hence, is on a journey to fight corruption. He gets information about Bank of Paradise, a Tenerife-based bank owned by Javed Bhai, which holds over a billiard rupees. The Grand Leakage Company has employed thousands of anonymous journalism students, who together take on corruption in India. Alia lands in India and tracks down Sathya's address, threatening to kill his parents and herself if he does not return home. Sathya returns but tells her he has no feelings for her. However, his parents, who have grown fond of Alia, refuse to let her go and try forcing Sathya to wed her.

After gathering details about Sathya, Javed Bhai informs the police about his activities, including his plan to wipe out all the money present at "Bank of Paradise". They are almost successful, but the police catch Sathya, and his four friends, who were assigned the task of completing the operation, are brutally murdered by local goons. After giving a stellar session in court, the public realise Sathya's goodness, including his craving for justice for all families below the poverty line. He even lets out the code of the accounts in the bank, letting his co "hacktivists" hack into the Bank of Paradise, dividing the money equally into the bank account of every above-poverty line Indian citizen, requesting them to give at least 10% of their money to below poverty line farmers and families, else they will be the reason their country gets ruined. He is then escorted to the Central Jail. En route, they are stopped, and Javed Bhai's men kidnap Sathya. Javed Bhai tells a reluctant Sathya to marry Alia but is double-crossed by his henchmen, who are ordered to kill Sathya by Minister Kotilinga, who was also involved in Javed's scams. Javed and Sathya take down all the goons. The film ends with Javed returning to Tenerife to continue his business, after having dropped Alia and Sathya in Goa, who then go undercover again.

== Cast ==
- Nandamuri Kalyan Ram as Sathya Marthand / Kalyan Ram
- Aditi Arya as Alia Khan
- Jagapati Babu as Javed Ibrahim / Javed Bhai
- Vennela Kishore as Sathya's friend
- Ali as Don Bosco
- Posani Krishna Murali as Minister Kotilingalu
- Jaya Prakash Reddy as MLA JP
- Tanikella Bharani as Dasaradharamaiah
- Easwari Rao as Satyavathi / Ammaji
- Srikanth Iyyengar as Police Officer Trivedi
- Shatru as Javed Bhai's henchmen
- Ajay Ghosh as Reporter
- Raghu Karumanchi
- Kalpa Latha
- Ravi Awana

== Soundtrack ==
Ism

Soundtrack album by Anup Rubens
- Released: 5 October 2016
- Recorded: 2016
- Genre: Soundtrack
- Length: 18:06
- Label: Aditya Music
- Producer: Anup Rubens

Anup Rubens chronology
Aatadukundam Raa (2016)	Ism (2016)	Katamarayudu (2017)

Music composed by Anup Rubens. Music released on ADITYA Music Company. Audio was launched on 5 October 2016, held at Hyderabad. Nandamuri Harikrishna NTR, Dil Raju and many other celebrities attended the function.

Original (Telugu)
No.	Title	Lyrics	Singer(s)	Length
1.	"Kanulu Navaina"	Bhaskarabhatla Ravi Kumar	Jubin Nautiyal, Mohana Bhogaraju	4:28
2.	"Yey Yey Yey Raa"	Bhaskarabhatla Ravi Kumar	Puri Jagannadh, Dhanunjay, Roll Rida	3:19
3.	"Ela Ela Ela"	Bhaskarabhatla Ravi Kumar	Shakthisree Gopalan, Krishna Lasya	4:08
4.	"Podaade Poda Poda"	Bhaskarabhatla Ravi Kumar	Spurthy, Teja Priya, Ramki	3:38
5.	"Ijam"	Puri Jagannadh	Puri Jagannadh, Anurag Kulkarni	2:33
Total length:				18:06

Hindi Dubbed Soundtrack launched on 14 September 2019 on Digital Music Platforms.

Track list (Hindi Dubbed)
No.	Title	Singer(s)	Length
1.	"Karlu Haan Main Pyaar"	Jubin Nautiyal, Mohana Bhogaraju	01:40
2.	"Yeh Dil Tera Hua"	Puri Jagannadh, Roll Rida	03:19
3.	"Chal Re"	Spurthy, Teja Priya	01:02
4.	"Journalism"	Puri Jagannadh	01:55
Total length:			07:57

== Reception ==
Srividya Palaparthi of The Times of India gave 2.5/5 stars and wrote "The movie is quite predictably every Puri film ever -- an unconquerable hero, a larger than life conspiracy, a bimbo who falls in love as a result of stalking."
