= Neekosam =

1999 film by Srinu Vaitla

- Theatrical release poster
- Directed by: Srinu Vaitla
- Written by: Srinu Vaitla
- Produced by: Ghanta Srinivas
- Starring: Ravi Teja; Maheswari; Brahmaji; Sivaji Raja
- Cinematography: C. Ramprasad
- Edited by: Kola Bhaskar
- Music by: R. P. Patnaik
- Production company: Kalpana Creations
- Release date: 3 December 1999
- Running time: 132 minutes
- Country: India
- Language: Telugu

Neekosam (transl. For You) is a 1999 Indian Telugu-language romantic drama film produced by Ghanta Srinivasa Rao under the Kalpana Creations banner. This movie marks the debut of Srinu Vaitla as a director. The film features Ravi Teja and Maheswari in the lead roles. This is also the first collaboration between Ravi Teja and Srinu Vaitla. The music has been composed by R. P. Patnaik. Despite the film being a box office failure, the film won several Nandi Awards.

== Plot ==
Sasi Rekha (Maheswari) is the daughter of a rich father (Jayaprakash Reddy), who is a strict disciplinarian and dislikes any kind of romantic love. Ravi (Ravi Teja), an orphan, falls in love with Sasi and she also slowly develops feelings for Ravi. One day Ravi meets Sasi's father in the outskirts of the city and tells him all about his love. However, he is accidentally killed by Ravi in a scuffle. Sasi soon finds out that the culprit is Ravi. Infuriated, she breaks up with him. Ravi, unable to bear the separation, jumps from a hilltop. He survives, only to be told by the doctors that he is disabled and might heal if someone took care of him. In the climax, Sasi decides to stay with Ravi, who is nothing but a vegetable now, stating that what ever he did was just because of his love for her and she still is in love with him.

== Cast ==
- Ravi Teja as Ravi
- Maheswari as Sasirekha
- Brahmaji
- Sivaji Raja
- Uttej
- Jaya Prakash Reddy as Sasirekha's father
- Chalapathi Rao
- Bandla Ganesh
- Maharshi Raghava as Mad man

== Soundtrack ==
The soundtrack is composed by R. P. Patnaik. "Konte Baapu" song is composed by Devi Sri Prasad. The audio rights of the soundtrack were purchased by Supreme Music.

Neekosam

Soundtrack album by R. P. Patnaik
- Released: 14 November 1999
- Genre: Film soundtrack
- Label: Supreme Music
- Producer: R. P. Patnaik

Track list
No.	Title	Lyrics	Music	Artist(s)	Length
1.	"Neekosam"	Sai Sri Harsha	R. P. Patnaik	Rajesh Krishnan, Kousalya	4:08
2.	"Maayo Emi Maayo"	Sai Sri Harsha	R. P. Patnaik	Mani Nagaraj, Kousalya	3:30
3.	"I Too Love You Antu"	Sai Sri Harsha	R. P. Patnaik	Mani Nagaraj, Nihal	4:54
4.	"Neekosam - Version 2"	Sai Sri Harsha	R. P. Patnaik	R. P. Patnaik, Kousalya	4:09
5.	"Maama Maama"	Sai Sri Harsha	R. P. Patnaik	R. P. Patnaik, Kousalya, Nihal	4:16
6.	"Konte Baapu"	Sai Sri Harsha	Devi Sri Prasad	Mano, Chitra	4:57

== Box office ==
The movie was an average grosser at the box office, but went on to win 4 Nandi Awards.

== Awards ==
Nandi Awards - 1999

- Second Best Feature Film - Silver - Ghanta Srinivas
- Best Actress - Maheswari
- Best Screenplay Writer - Sreenu Vaitla
- Best First Film of a Director - Sreenu Vaitla
