= Jayeebhava =

- Poster
- Directed by: Naren Kondepati
- Written by: Naren Kondepati
- Produced by: Nandamuri Kalyan Ram
- Starring: Nandamuri Kalyan Ram; Hansika Motwani
- Cinematography: Dasaradhi Sivendra
- Edited by: Gautham Raju
- Music by: S. S. Thaman
- Release date: 23 October 2009
- Country: India
- Language: Telugu

Jayeebhava (transl. Be Victorious) is a 2009 Indian Telugu-language action comedy film directed by Naren Kondepati. It stars Kalyan Ram and Hansika Motwani in the lead roles. The music was composed by S. S. Thaman. The film was a failure at the box office. This film was dubbed into Hindi as Badmash No. 1.

== Plot ==
Bhavani Shankar (Mukesh Rishi) and Narasimha (Jaya Prakash Reddy) are two warring leaders in their town. Ram (Nandamuri Kalyan Ram) is the son of Bhavani Shankar. He falls in love with Anjali (Hansika Motwani) when he is abroad. After coming back to the town, they realize they belong to two warring groups. The rest of the story is about how Ram and Anjali play a game to unite their fathers.

== Cast ==
- Kalyan Ram as Ram
- Hansika Motwani as Anjali
- Mukesh Rishi as Bhavani Shankar, Ram's father
- Venu Madhav as Ram's friend
- Jaya Prakash Reddy as Narasimha, Anjali's father
- Ashish Vidyarthi as Yadagiri aka Yaadu Bhai
- Ali as Balu, Anjali's driver
- Brahmanandam as Priest
- Chalapathi Rao as Ram's grandfather
- Raghu Babu as "Tiger" Paandu
- Banerjee as Banerjee
- Sudha as Anjali's mother
- Pragathi as Ram's mother
- Hema as Ram's aunt
- Raghu Karumanchi

== Soundtrack ==
The music was composed by S. Thaman and released by Aditya Music.

Jayeebhava

Soundtrack album by S. Thaman
- Released: 1 Oct 2009
- Recorded: 2009
- Genre: Soundtrack
- Length: 19:35
- Label: Aditya Music
- Producer: S. Thaman

S. Thaman chronology
Sankham (2009)	Jayeebhava (2009)	Mundhinam Paartheney (2010)

Track list
No.	Title	Lyrics	Singer(s)	Length
1.	"Telupu Rangu"	Krishna Chaitanya	Karthik, Priyadarshini	3:42
2.	"Zindhagi"	Ramajogayya Sastry	Adnan Sami, Andrea Jeremiah	3:50
3.	"Gundelona Nenu"	Ramajogayya Sastry	Mamta Mohandas	4:10
4.	"Kanti Choopu"	Ramajogayya Sastry	Ranjith, Naveen	3:24
5.	"Okkasari"	Sirivennela Seetharama Sastry	Karthik, Shreya Ghoshal	4:29
Total length:				19:35
