= Raghu Karumanchi =

Indian actor

- Born: 12 May 1968 (age 58); Hyderabad, Andhra Pradesh, India
- Other name: Adhurs Raghu
- Occupation: Actor
- Years active: 2002 - Present

Raghu Karumanchi is an Indian actor who appears in Telugu films. He acted in more than 150 films. He also appeared in several television shows, including Jabardasth.

== Personal life ==
He was born and brought up in Hyderabad. His family hails from Tenali, Andhra Pradesh. His father is a retired army officer and his mother is a housewife. He completed his MBA and worked as a software engineer. He is married and has two children.

== Career ==
He made his debut as an actor with the film Aadi starring Jr. NTR. He got break as an actor with the film Adhurs. He also led a team called Roller Raghu in the popular TV comedy show Jabardasth on ETV.

He appeared in 1500 TV episodes in 32 titles on various channels. He received an award from Prasar Bharati and UNICEF for producing the best short film on saving the girl child in 2006.

== Filmography ==
=== Telugu films ===
Year	Title	Role	Notes
2002	Aadi	Simhadri	
2002	Neetho	Madhav's friend	
2003	Tagore	Subbu	
2007	Yogi		
2008	Nagaram	Right's henchman	
2008	Hare Ram		
2008	Black & White		
2009	Kick	priest	
2010	Adhurs	Pandu's gang member	
2010	Brindavanam		
2010	Kalyanram Kathi		
2011	Oosaravelli	J. P.'s henchman	
2011	Pilla Zamindar	Ramana	
2011	Madatha Kaja	Henchman	
2012	Bodyguard	Cash Reddy's friend	
2012	Sudigadu	Thikkal Reddy's henchman	
2012	Devaraya	Dorababu	
2013	Donga Police		
2013	Jaffa	Prison mate	
2013	Naayak	Venu's friend	
2013	Sukumarudu	U. Venkat Rao	
2013	Mirchi		
2014	Yevadu		
2014	Race Gurram	Peddi Reddy's henchman	
2014	Nuvvala Nenila		
2014	Rabhasa	Dhanunjay's henchman	
2014	Power	Raghu	
2014	Aagadu	Biriyani Raju	
2014	Loukyam	Banti	
2014	Govindudu Andarivadele	Bangari's friend	
2015	Pataas	Mahathi's colleague	
2015	Kick 2		
2015	Temper	Madhav	
2015	Ketugadu		
2015	Where Is Vidya Balan	Srinu	
2015	Mirchi Lanti Kurradu		
2015	Soukhyam	Bavuji's henchman	
2015	Dagudumootha Dandakor		
2016	Supreme	MLA's henchman	
2016	Oopiri	Police Officer	
2016	Speedunnodu		
2016	Ism		
2016	Banthi Poola Janaki		
2017	Khaidi No. 150	Ward Corporator	
2017	Winner		
2017	Kittu Unnadu Jagratha		
2017	Samanthakamani	Constable Satyanarayana	
2017	Anando Brahma	Ghost	
2017	Nene Raju Nene Mantri	Chandramouli	
2017	Raja the Great	Kabaddi Team Player	
2017	Balakrishnudu		
2018	Raa Raa		
2018	Kirrak Party	Peon	
2018	Devadas	Local Rowdy	
2018	Geetha Govindam		
2018	Premaku Raincheck	Momo	
2019	Sye Raa Narasimha Reddy	Bulli Reddy	
2019	90ML	John Wick's henchman	
2019	Venky Mama	Raghuramaiah	
2019	Ruler	Arnold	
2020	Anukunnadi Okkati Ayyandhi Okati	Cult Kameshwar Rao	
2021	Zombie Reddy	Veera Reddy's henchmen	
2021	Crazy Uncles		
2022	Hero	henchmen	
2022	S5 No Exit		
2023	Amigos	Thief	
2023	7:11 PM	Ganda	
2023	Slum Dog Husband		
2024	Viraaji		
2024	Gorre Puranam		
2024	Viswam		
2025	Game Changer	local goon	
2025	Oh Bhama Ayyo Rama	Guy in stories	
2025	Sundarakanda	Venkatarao’s henchman	
2025	Mithra Mandali	Goon	
2026	Sampradayini Suppini Suddapoosani		

=== Dakhini films ===
Year	Title	Role	Notes
2005	The Angrez	Nerella Ramesh	
2006	Hyderabad Nawabs	Arif	
2015	The Angrez 2	Nerella Ramesh	
2019	Hyderabad Nawabs 2		

=== Other language films ===
Year	Title	Role	Language	Notes
2011	Siruthai	Acid Raja	Tamil	
2016	Thozha	Police Officer	Tamil	
2016	Goli Soda		Kannada	Dubbed in Telugu as Evadu Thakkuva Kadu

=== Television ===
Year	Title	Role	Network	Notes	Ref.
2013	Jabardasth	Various	ETV		
2016–2017	Alitho Saradaga	Co-presenter	ETV	Episodes: 1–23	
2023	Athidhi	Harsha	Disney+ Hotstar		
