= Nandamuri Kalyan Ram =

Indian actor and film producer

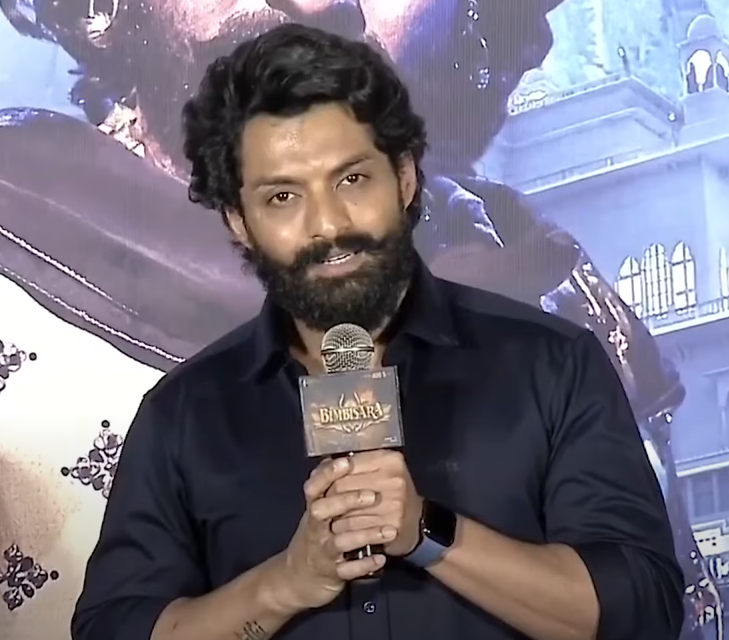
- Kalyan Ram in 2022
- Born: 5 July 1978 (age 48); Hyderabad, Andhra Pradesh (now in Telangana), India
- Education: Illinois Institute of Technology, Chicago (MS)
- Occupations: Actor; film producer
- Years active: 1989; 2003–present
- Spouse: Swati (m. 2006)
- Children: 2
- Parent: Nandamuri Harikrishna (father)
- Family: See Nandamuri–Nara family

Nandamuri Kalyan Ram (born 5 July 1978) is an Indian actor and film producer who works in Telugu cinema. He is the son of actor-politician Nandamuri Harikrishna. Ram is best known for his roles in action films such as Athanokkade (2005), Hare Ram (2008), 118 (2019), and Bimbisara (2022). Ram is the chairperson of the production company N. T. R. Arts, named after his paternal grandfather N. T. Rama Rao.

He also owns "Advitha Creative Studios", a video effects company, which provided special effects for movies such as Legend, Nannaku Prematho and Krishnashtami.

== Early life ==
Kalyan Ram was born in Hyderabad, Telangana, to Nandamuri Harikrishna and his first wife, Lakshmi Kumari. He is the grandson of actor and politician N. T. Rama Rao. His half-brother, N. T. Rama Rao Jr., is also an actor. Ram was schooled at St. Pauls, Hyderabad and KCP Siddardha Adarsh Residential School, Vijayawada. He obtained his engineering degree in Coimbatore and completed masters in Illinois Institute of Technology, Chicago. Though he desired to join the film industry immediately after engineering, he pursued masters on the insistence of his father who wanted him to be first person in their family to earn a post-graduate degree.

== Career ==
In 1989 Ram acted with his uncle Nandamuri Balakrishna in the film Bala Gopaludu as a child artist. Later, he started his acting career in 2003 with Tholi Choopulone followed by Abhimanyu, which were both commercial failures. In 2005, he established his own banner N.T.R. Arts under the name of his grandfather N. T. Rama Rao known as 'NTR'. He then produced Athanokkade, which introduced Surender Reddy as a director, and it was a critical and commercial success. His next films Asadhyudu, Lakshmi Kalyanam and Vijayadasami bombed at the box office. However, his 2008 release Hare Ram became a critical and commercial success. His 2009 release Jayeebhava and 2010 release Kalyanram Kathi emerged as commercial failures. In 2013, Ram produced and starred in Om 3D which was touted as India's first 3D action film and was released in late summer 2013. Despite the hype, the film ended up as a commercial failure.

In 2015, Ram starred in Pataas which turned out to be a blockbuster with positive reviews. For the first time, he produced a film without himself as the lead, titled Kick 2 under N.T.R. Arts. It stars Ravi Teja as a lead, and is directed by Surender Reddy, which turned out to be a flop at the box office. Ram's later release for 2015 featuring him as the lead was Sher opposite actress Sonal Chauhan. It was directed by Mallikarjun and was produced by Vijayalakshmi Pictures.

In 2016, Ram produced and starred in Puri Jagannadh's Ism as an undercover journalist. In 2018, he acted the lead role in the film MLA and Naa Nuvve. In 2019, he played the role of his father Nandamuri Harikrishna in the films N.T.R: Kathanayakudu and N.T.R: Mahanayakudu. He then proceeded to star in K. V. Guhan's 118 along with Shalini Pandey and Nivetha Thomas. The film became a critical and commercial success.

Ram's next release was the 2020 film Entha Manchivaadavuraa directed by Satish Vegesna of Sathamanam Bhavati fame. It is an official remake of the Gujarati-language film Oxygen.

Ram stars in the 2023 film Devil: The British Secret Agent.

He then starred in the 2025 film, Arjun Son of Vyjayanthi, which became a commercial flop. His next film, VenkyAnil5 or NKRAR2, will mark his reunion with director Anil Ravipudi after the blockbuster Pataas, in which he will also star alongside Venkatesh Daggubati. This movie is releasing in Sankranthi 2027.

== Personal life ==
Ram married Swathi on 9 August 2006. They have two children, a son and a daughter.

== Filmography ==
=== As an actor ===
Key
†	Denotes films that have not yet been released

Year	Film	Role	Notes	Ref.
1989	Bala Gopaludu	Raja	Child artist	
2003	Tholi Choopulone	Raju	Debut as a lead actor	
2003	Abhimanyu	Abhimanyu		
2005	Athanokkade	Ram		
2006	Asadhyudu	Pardhu		
2007	Lakshmi Kalyanam	Ramu		
2007	Vijayadasami	Sivakasi		
2008	Hare Ram	Ram and Hari (Note: Kalyan Ram played two characters.)		
2009	Jayeebhava	Ram		
2010	Kalyanram Kathi	Rama Krishna		
2013	Om 3D	Arjun		
2015	Pataas	Kalyan		
2015	Sher	Gautham		
2016	Ism	Satya Marthand / Kalyan Ram		
2018	MLA	Kalyan Chaturvedi		
2018	Naa Nuvve	Varun		
2019	N.T.R: Kathanayakudu	Nandamuri Harikrishna	Cameo	
2019	N.T.R: Mahanayakudu	Nandamuri Harikrishna	Cameo	
2019	118	Gautam		
2020	Entha Manchivaadavuraa	Balu		
2022	Bimbisara	Bimbisara and Devadutta		
2023	Amigos	Siddharth, Manjunath Hegde and Michael alias Bipin Roy (Note: Kalyan Ram played three characters.)		
2023	Devil: The British Secret Agent	Trivarna / Agent Devil		
2025	Arjun Son Of Vyjayanthi	Arjun Vishwanath	Also producer	
2027	January 12 Vidudala			

=== As a producer ===
Year	Film	Notes	Ref.
2005	Athanokkade		
2008	Hare Ram		
2009	Jayeebhava		
2010	Kalyanram Kathi		
2013	Om 3D		
2015	Pataas		
2015	Kick 2		
2016	Ism		
2017	Jai Lava Kusa		
2022	Bimbisara		
2024	Devara: Part 1		
TBA	Devara: Part 2		
