= Vakkantham Vamsi =

Screenwriter

- Born: Arikela Village, Ramasamudram, Chittoor District, Andhra Pradesh, India
- Occupations: Screenwriter, director
- Years active: 1999–present

Vakkantham Vamsi is an Indian screenwriter and director in Telugu cinema. His notable screenwriting credits include Kick (2009), Yevadu (2014), Race Gurram (2014), and Temper (2015).

== Early life and career ==
He was born in Arikela village near Punganur in Chittoor district of Andhra Pradesh and graduated from Sri Venkateswara University. He continued his father's Vakkantham Suryanarayana Rao legacy in writings. He gained recognition for his language diction and acting skills during his schooling. Vamsi started his career as a News presenter, television anchor and starred as Suka Muni in Bapu – Ramana's tele serial Bhagavatham telecasted on ETV. He made his Telugu film acting debut with Kalyana Prapthirasthu opposite Suma, directed by Dasari Narayana Rao. After the release of his film Kick he became one of the popular writers of Telugu Cinema.

== Filmography ==
Film credits
Year	Title	Writer	Director	Notes
1999	Prema Kosam	Story	No	
2002	Kalusukovalani	Dialogues	No	
2006	Ashok	Story	No	
2007	Athidhi	Writing assistance	No	
2009	Kick	Story	No	
2009	Kavya's Diary	Dialogues	No	
2010	Kalyanram Kathi	Story	No	
2011	Oosaravelli	Story	No	
2014	Yevadu	Story	No	
2014	Race Gurram	Story	No	
2015	Temper	Story	No	
2015	Kick 2	Story and dialogues	No	
2017	Aaradugula Bullet	Story	No	
2018	Touch Chesi Chudu	Story	No	
2018	Naa Peru Surya	Yes	Yes	
2023	Agent	Story	No	
2023	Extra Ordinary Man	Yes	Yes	
