= Athanokkade =

2005 film directed by Surender Reddy

- Theatrical release poster
- Directed by: Surender Reddy
- Screenplay by: Surender Reddy
- Dialogues by: Marudhuri Raja
- Story by: Surender Reddy
- Produced by: Nandamuri Janaki Ram
- Starring: Kalyan Ram; Sindu Tolani; Ashish Vidyarthi
- Cinematography: C. Ram Prasad
- Edited by: Gautham Raju
- Music by: Mani Sharma
- Production company: N.T.R. Arts
- Release date: 7 May 2005
- Running time: 147 minutes
- Country: India
- Language: Telugu
- Box office: ₹9 crore distributors' share

Athanokkade (transl. He's the only one) is a 2005 Indian Telugu-language action film written and directed by Surender Reddy and produced by Nandamuri Janaki Ram under N. T. R. Arts. It stars Nandamuri Kalyan Ram, alongside Sindhu Tolani, Ashish Vidyarthi, Prakash Raj, Chandra Mohan, Rajyalakshmi, Brahmanandam, Surya, Narsing Yadav, Ahuti Prasad and Ajay. The music was composed by Mani Sharma, while the cinematography and editing were handled by C. Ram Prasad and Gautham Raju.

Athanokkade was released theatrically on 7 May 2005 to positive reviews from critics and became commercially successful. The film was dubbed in Hindi as International Don and was remade in Tamil as Aathi and in Kannada as Lakshmana.

== Plot ==
Anjali and her maternal uncle Ramachandran kills Bhavani Shankar, a retired DGP, by pretending to feed food for white pigeons in a beach.

Meanwhile, Ram, who lives with his loving adopted parents and sister in New Delhi, takes up a course at a college in Hyderabad despite his parents's wishes. Anjali, who is also studying in the same college as Ram, has her own agenda to exact vengeance against Anna, a local gangster, for her family's death. Ramachandran attempts to kill Anna's aide Abdullah, but Ram kills Abdullah and threatens Anna that he will kill Sada, Anna's second main aide. An enraged Sada goes to kill Ram, but Ram kills Sada. Ram's family witnesses this and are horrified by his actions. Ram reveals his past to his foster parents.

Past: Ram's real father is an honest ACP in Hyderabad. Ram's father arrests one of Anna's henchmen. It is revealed that Anjali and Ram are from the same family as Anjali's father is Ram's father's brother-in-law. Anna meets Ram's grandfather and threatens him to release his henchmen, but Ram's grandfather refuses and Anna gets arrested. An infuriated Anna, along with his henchmen and Bhavani Shankar, finish the whole family. Anjali, Ramachandran and Ram are the main survivors of the attack. Ram escapes and is taken by his foster parents. Anjali feels that one of her family members is alive as someone (who is revealed to be Ram) keeps a flower on the Buddha statue of their former house, which is now a library.

Present: Ram's foster parents request Ram to come back, but he refuses and takes them to the railway station. Ram is nearly ambushed by Anna's henchmen, but he defeats them and meets Anna, warning him to bring his brother from Dubai. Anna arrives and kills Ramachandran before challenging Ram to meet him at his brother's place. Ram, after learning that Anna has Anjali kept under hostage, escapes after killing Anna's brother. Ram kills Anna and reunites with Anjali and his foster parents.

== Cast ==
- Kalyan Ram as Ram
- Sindhu Tolani as Anjali
- Ashish Vidyarthi as Anna
- Prakash Raj as Prakash, Ram's father
- Giri Babu as Rama Chandra Murthy, Anjali's father
- Chandra Mohan as Chandram, Ram's adopted father
- Brahmanandam as Johnny
- Rajyalakshmi as Satyavathi, Ram's mother
- Geetha as Janaki, Ram's adopted mother
- Sudha as Rajyalakshmi, Anjali's mother
- Vinaya Prasad as Janaki, Ram and Anjali's aunt
- Surya as Ramachandran, Ram and Anjali's uncle
- Sudeepa Pinky as Ram's adopted sister
- Chalapathi Rao as Ram's grandfather
- Venu Madhav as Gulab Singh
- Swathi Katrapati as Anjali's friend
- Rami Reddy as Pattabhai
- Ahuti Prasad as DGP Bhavani Shankar
- Ajay as Anna's brother
- Raghu Babu as Abdullah
- Narsing Yadav as Narsing, Anna's henchmen
- G. V. Sudhakar Naidu as Sadha
- Dharmavarapu Subrahmanyam as Subramanyam, Ram's foster father
- Vizag Prasad as Minister

== Soundtrack ==
The music was composed by Mani Sharma and released by Aditya Music. The song "Chita Pata" is based on "Dhoom Thanakkadi" from the Malayalam film Mullavalliyum Thenmavum.

Athanokkade

Soundtrack album by Mani Sharma
- Released: 9 April 2005
- Recorded: 2005
- Genre: Soundtrack
- Length: 29:15
- Label: Aditya Music
- Producer: Mani Sharma

Mani Sharma chronology
Subash Chandra Bose (2005)	Athanokkade (2005)	Narasimhudu (2005)

Track list
No.	Title	Lyrics	Singer(s)	Length
1.	"Meghamala"	Bandaru Danaiah	Ranjith, Sunitha	5:10
2.	"Chita Pata"	Chandrabose	Tippu, Sunitha	4:43
3.	"Nauty Girl"	Chinni Charan	Venu, Ganga	4:32
4.	"Amma Devudo"	Sahithi	Karthik, Ganga	5:25
5.	"Gundelalo"	Sai Sri Harsha	Mallikarjun, K. S. Chithra	5:11
6.	"Athanokkade"	Sai Sri Harsha	Ranjith	4:14
Total length:				29:15

== Release ==
=== Reception ===
B. Anuradha of Rediff.com opined that "All in all, this is a lavish masala film is worth watching". Jeevi of Idlebrain.com said that "On a whole, Athanokkade is a commendable effort by the debutant director Surendar and debutant producer Kalyanram Nandamuri". A critic from Full Hyderabad wrote that "On the whole, a film worth a watch".

=== Box office ===
The film was released with 72 prints initially and later 24 prints were added. The film became a commercial success. It ran for 50 days in 80 centres and crossed 100 days in 46 centres in India.

=== Remakes ===
The film was remade in Tamil as Aathi (2006) and in Kannada as Lakshmana (2016). The film was set to be remade in Hindi as He, The Only One, but the film was never released. It was later dubbed in Hindi as International Don.

== Accolades ==
Filmfare Awards South

- Best Villain - Ashish Vidyarthi

Nandi Awards

- Best Debut Director - Surender Reddy
- Best Character Actor - Chandra Mohan
