= Ravi Teja =

Indian actor and film producer (born 1968)

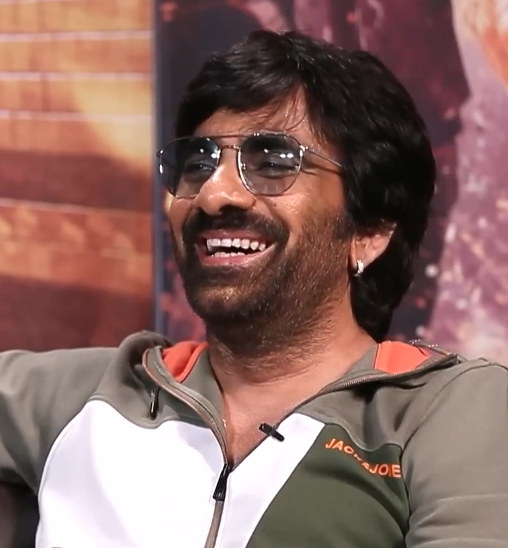
- Ravi Teja in 2022
- Born: Bhupatiraju Ravi Shankar; 26 January 1968 (age 58); Jaggampeta, Andhra Pradesh, India
- Other name: Mass Maharaja
- Education: Siddhartha Degree College, Vijayawada (dropped out)
- Occupations: Actor; Film producer
- Years active: 1988–present
- Spouse: Kalyani (m. 2002)
- Children: 2

Bhupatiraju Ravi Shankar (born 26 January 1968), known professionally as Ravi Teja, is an Indian actor and film producer known for his work in Telugu cinema. Known for his comic timing, he has received several accolades, including three Nandi Awards and a Filmfare Award South. He was featured in Forbes India's list of top 100 celebrities in 2012, 2013, and 2015. Recognised for his roles in action comedy films, he is popularly referred to as "Mass Maharaja".

Teja began his career with an uncredited role in Karthavyam (1990) and went on to play minor roles in several films. He later appeared in supporting roles in Sindhooram (1997), Manasichi Choodu (1998), Premaku Velayara (1999), Samudram (1999), and Annayya (2000). During this period, he also worked as an assistant director. He made his debut as a lead actor with Nee Kosam (1999), which was an average grosser at the box office but earned him the Nandi Special Jury Award.

Teja gained recognition with Itlu Sravani Subramanyam (2001), Aunu Valliddaru Ishta Paddaru! (2002), and Idiot (2002), establishing himself as a leading actor. He further cemented his position with films such as Khadgam (2002), Amma Nanna O Tamila Ammayi (2003), Venky (2004), Naa Autograph (2004), Bhadra (2005), and Vikramarkudu (2006). His subsequent notable films include Dubai Seenu (2007), Krishna (2008), Neninthe (2008), Kick (2009), Don Seenu (2010), Mirapakay (2011), Balupu (2013), Power (2014), Bengal Tiger (2015), Raja the Great (2017), Krack (2021), Dhamaka (2022), Waltair Veerayya (2023) and Irumudi (2026).

== Early life ==
Ravi Teja was born in Jaggampeta in the erstwhile East Godavari district of Andhra Pradesh. His father, Bhupathiraju Rajagopal Raju was a pharmacist and his mother, Bhupathiraju Rajya Lakshmi was a homemaker. Ravi Teja is the eldest of three sons, the others being Bharath Raju and Raghu, who are also actors.

Teja spent most of his childhood in Northern India because of his father's work. His schooling was done in Jaipur, Delhi, Mumbai, and Bhopal. He was fascinated with cinema right from his childhood. He idolized Amitabh Bachchan and would re-enact scenes from his films at home. Later on he moved to Vijayawada along with his family. He attended Siddhartha Degree College, Vijayawada but eventually dropped out. Teja is fluent in both Telugu and Hindi and can converse in English.

== Career ==
=== 1988–1996: Early struggles ===
Half way through his graduation, Teja went to Madras in 1988 to pursue a career in films. In his early years in Madras, YVS Chowdary and Gunasekhar were his roommates. He played small roles in the films Karthavyam (1990), Abhimanyu (1990), Chaitanya (1991), Collector Gaari Alludu (1992), and Aaj Ka Goonda Raj (1992). Teja became an assistant director, working in several Bollywood as well as Telugu projects including Pratibandh, Aaj Ka Goonda Raj, and Criminal. He met Krishna Vamsi and worked as an assistant director under him for the 1996 hit film Ninne Pelladata. Vamsi also gave Ravi Teja the opportunity to act in a small role in that film. He continued to work as an assistant director for a few other films.

=== 1997–2000: Recognition ===
In 1997, while still working as an assistant director, Teja got an opportunity to act in the film Sindhooram directed by Krishna Vamsi in a supporting role. The film won the National Film Award for Best Feature Film in Telugu.

Teja followed up with roles in the films Seetharama Raju, Padutha Teeyaga, Manasichi Choodu and S. V. Krishna Reddy's Premaku Velayara. In 1999, he was cast in a leading role by Srinu Vaitla for Nee Kosam. The film won the Silver Nandi for Best Film. Ravi Teja won the Nandi Award for Best Actor Special Jury for his performance. Following this, he started appearing in more significant roles such as Krishna Vamsi's Samudram, Chiranjeevi's Annayya and Budget Padmanabham. He also appeared in lead roles in multi-starrer films such as Kshemamga Velli Labhamga Randi, Tirumala Tirupati Venkatesa, Sakutumba Saparivaara Sametam and Ammayi Kosam.

=== 2001–2005: Breakthrough as a lead actor ===
In 2001, Teja's association with Puri Jagannadh began when he cast Ravi Teja as the lead role in Itlu Sravani Subramanyam. The film was a commercial hit and got Teja credibility as a solo lead actor. In 2002, his next film Avunu Valliddaru Ista Paddaru!, directed by Vamsy and co-starring Kalyani was released. The film was a successful at the box office and won Teja acclaim. The year also saw Teja in Idiot, directed by Puri Jagannadh and co-starring Rakshita, it was a blockbuster hit and Teja's performance and dialogue delivery were praised by critics and movie-goers alike.

The year also saw the release of Krishna Vamsi's Khadgam. The film was a huge success at the box office and won the Sarojini Devi Award for a Film on National Integration. Teja's portrayal of a young wannabe actor won him the Nandi Special Jury Award for the second time. In 2003, Ravi Teja worked again with director Puri Jagannadh for Amma Nanna O Tamila Ammayi. The film co-starring Asin became a blockbuster hit and Jeevi of Idlebrain praised him: "Ravi Teja did well. His strength lies in his dialogue delivery and reckless body language". The year also saw Teja working in commercially successful films such as Dongodu, co-starring Kalyani and directed by Srinivas Bheemineni and Veede, co-starring Aarthi Agarwal and directed by Ravi Raja Pinisetty. In the same year, Teja was also seen in films such as Ee Abbai Chala Manchodu, Anveshana and Oka Raju Oka Rani, which failed to do well at the box office.

In 2004, Teja starred in Venky, directed by Vaitla. Idlebrain wrote: "His comedy is very good in the first half. His antics with Siddanthi and the way he curses himself in front of the mirror is hilarious". He appeared in Naa Autograph directed by cinematographer turned director S. Gopal Reddy. A critic from nowrunning.com wrote: "Ravi Teja delivers a stunning performance as a dejected lover". Chanti was directed by Sobhan. In 2005, Ravi Teja's work included Bhadra, directed by Boyapati Srinu and Bhageeratha, directed by Rasool Ellor. He also worked in the crime film Shock, directed by Harish Shankar and produced by Ram Gopal Varma.

=== 2006–2011: Established actor and commercial success ===
In 2006, Teja worked with the director S. S. Rajamouli for Vikramarkudu. The film which grossed over ₹250 million (equivalent to ₹880 million or US$9.4 million in 2026) proved to be his highest-grossing film until then. Idlebrain praised his performance: "Vikramarkudu is the best film of Ravi Teja so far in histrionics aspect. He did both characters of Atthili Sathi Babu and Vikram Rathod equally well, His mannerism of "jintata" is simply superb". Consequently, Ravi Teja went on to play the lead in Khatarnak (2006) and Dubai Seenu (2007), his third collaboration with director Vaitla. In 2008, Teja acted in three films, V. V. Vinayak's Krishna, Baladur and Neninthe. Neninthe marked his fourth collaboration with director Puri. Although the film was not successful at the box office, Teja's portrayal of an up-and-coming director in the film received acclaim and won him Nandi Award for Best Actor.

In 2009, Teja worked with director Surender Reddy for action comedy Kick. The film was a huge commercial success grossing over ₹300 million (equivalent to ₹820 million or US$8.8 million in 2026). Later that year, he appeared in Anjaneyulu. In 2010, his films included Shambo Shiva Shambo and Gopichand Malineni-directed Don Seenu.

In 2011, Teja appeared in four films. His first release was Harish Shankar's Mirapakay. He later starred in Ram Gopal Varma's Dongala Mutha and made a cameo appearance as a body double of himself in Katha Screenplay Darshakatvam Appalaraju, also directed Varma. His last release of the year was Veera. Later after this film, he went on to be called "'Mass Maharaja'" for his mass action scenes.

=== 2012–2026: Career slump and decline ===
Teja on the sets of Balupu (2013)

In 2012, Teja starred in four films starring with Gunasekhar's Nippu and Siva's Daruvu. He collaborated for the fifth time with director Puri for the fantasy comedy Devudu Chesina Manushulu. He later appeared in Parasuram's Sarocharu Rediff.com wrote: "Ravi Teja is in a different avatar, a more subdued one. A change of image and role is necessary for an actor and Teja makes the transition fairly well".

In 2013, Teja started in Malineni's action comedy Balupu. The Times of India wrote, "Ravi Teja has come up with an entertaining performance. His characterization and the flashback episode as Kancharapalem Shankar looked very powerful on the screen. He gets into the skin of the character and has done well." The film turned one of the biggest commercial successes of the year.

In 2014, he starred in Power with debutant director K. S. Ravindra along with a cameo appearance in Sairam Shankar's Romeo. In 2015, he collaborated with director Surender Reddy again for Kick's sequel. Kick 2, produced by Nandamuri Kalyan Ram. Despite huge expectations, the film was a box office failure. He later played the lead in Bengal Tiger (2015), directed by Sampath Nandi. This film which grossed over ₹400 million (equivalent to ₹630 million or US$6.7 million in 2026), became one of the highest grossing Telugu films of that year.

After taking a sabbatical for one year, he played a blind man in Anil Ravipudi-directed Raja the Great (2017). The film was Teja's first ₹500 million (equivalent to ₹770 million or US$8.2 million in 2026) grosser and one of his biggest hits. In 2018, Ravi Teja starred in three films, Touch Chesi Chudu, Nela Ticket, and Amar Akbar Anthony, which were all huge critical and commercial failures. His only film in 2020, Disco Raja, where he played a dual role, also bombed at the box office.

In 2021, Krack marked his third collaboration with Gopichand Malineni, after Don Seenu and Balupu. It was highly successful at the box office and a big comeback for him.

In 2022, his first two films, Khiladi and Ramarao on Duty, both ended up as huge box office disasters. However, his third release in the year, Dhamaka, was highly successful at the box office, eventually becoming the highest-grossing film of his career.

In 2023, he reunited with Chiranjeevi, after Annayya, for Waltair Veerayya. It was also his second collaboration with K. S. Ravindra, after Power. His following two releases of the year, Ravanasura and Tiger Nageswara Rao, were huge commercial disasters, further proving his commercial inconsistency at the box office.

In 2024, he starred in Eagle directed by Karthik Ghattamaneni, his cinematographer from Disco Raja and Dhamaka. Upon release, it opened to mixed reviews from the critics and audience, alike. Though his performance and the attempt to break away from his masala entertainer image were highly lauded, it ended up as a below-average performer at the box-office. He reunited with Harish Shankar in Mr. Bachchan, the official remake of Raid (2018), the same year. Upon release, it was thrashed by the critics and audience, alike, becoming a huge commercial disaster.

His only release in 2025 was the masala entertainer Mass Jathara, directed by dialogue writer Bhanu Bogavarapu and reuniting with his co-star from Dhamaka, Sreeleela. Like his previous few films, it too ended up as a commercial disaster.

In 2026, he starred in Bhartha Mahasayulaku Wignyapthi directed by Kishore Tirumala. Like Daggubati Venkatesh, he attempted to penetrate further to the Telugu family audience. However, upon release coinciding with Sankranthi, it opened to mixed reviews. Though it had decent openings, it was eventually sandwiched amongst intense competition with other releases of the festive period and ended up as a commercial disappointment.

=== Career resurgence ===
His next film, Irumudi also released in 2026 opened to positive reviews whom deeming as his comeback, eventually becoming his highest grossing film in his career.

== Personal life ==
On 26 May 2002 Teja married Kalyani who hails from Ganapavaram, West Godavari District. The couple have a daughter, Mokshadha and a son, Mahadhan. His brother Bharath Raju died in a car accident in Hyderabad in 2017. His nephew Maadhav Bhupathiraju is also an actor.

== Discography ==
Year	Film	Song	Composer	Ref.
2013	Balupu	"Kajalu Chellivaa"	S. Thaman	
2014	Power	"Notanki Notanki"	S. Thaman	
2017	Raja the Great	"Raja The Great"	Sai Karthik	
2020	Disco Raja	"Rum Pum Bum"	S. Thaman	
2023	Ravanasura	"Pyaar Lona Paagal"	Harshavardhan Rameswar	

== Awards and nominations ==
Year	Film	Award	Result	Ref.
1999	Nee Kosam	Filmfare Award for Best Actor – Telugu	Nominated	
1999	Nee Kosam	Nandi Special Jury Award	Won	
2002	Khadgam	Nandi Special Jury Award	Won	
2002	Khadgam	Filmfare Award for Best Supporting Actor – Telugu	Nominated	
2008	Krishna	Filmfare Award for Best Actor – Telugu	Nominated	
2009	Kick	Filmfare Award for Best Actor – Telugu	Nominated	
2010	Neninthe	Nandi Award for Best Actor	Won	
2023	Waltair Veerayya	Filmfare Award for Best Supporting Actor – Telugu	Won	

== See also ==
- List of Indian film actors
