= Surender Reddy =

Indian film director

- Born: Karimnagar district, Telangana, India
- Occupations: Film director; screenwriter
- Years active: 2005–present

Surender Reddy is an Indian film director and screenwriter who works in Telugu cinema. He made his directorial debut with Athanokkade (2005), which won him Nandi Award for Best First Film of a Director. He later directed films such as Ashok (2006), Kick (2009), Oosaravelli (2011), Race Gurram (2014), Dhruva (2016), and Sye Raa Narasimha Reddy (2019). He won SIIMA Award for Best Director – Telugu for Race Gurram.

== Early life ==
Reddy was born and brought up in Machanapalli village of Karimnagar district, Telangana. Hailing from an affluent family, Reddy is fourth of six children. His father Veera Reddy worked as the Sarpanch of the village. Surender Reddy discontinued his graduation and moved to Hyderabad to pursue a career in films.

== Career ==
Initially, he worked as an assistant director for the movie Preminchedi Endukamma (1999). He made his directorial debut with Athanokkade featuring Nandamuri Kalyan Ram. He next directed Ashok (2006), starring Jr NTR and Sameera Reddy.

His noted films are Kick starring Ravi Teja & Ileana D'Cruz and Race Gurram starring Allu Arjun and Shruti Haasan. All the films he directed except for Athanokkade are the stories written by Vakkantham Vamsi.

In 2015, Reddy directed Kick 2 re-uniting with Ravi Teja for the sequel of Kick. The film grossed over ₹6 crore on its opening day, the highest for Ravi Teja.

== Filmography ==
Year	Title	Notes
2005	Athanokkade	Directional Debut
2006	Ashok	
2007	Athidhi	
2009	Kick	
2011	Oosaravelli	
2014	Race Gurram	
2015	Kick 2	Cameo appearance
2016	Dhruva	Remake of Thani Oruvan
2019	Sye Raa Narasimha Reddy	
2023	Agent	
TBA	PSPK32 †	Pre-production

== Awards and nominations ==
Year	Film	Award	Category	Result	Ref.
2005	Athanokkade	Nandi Awards	Best First Film of a Director	Won	
2009	Kick	Filmfare Awards South	Best Director – Telugu	Nominated	
2014	Race Gurram	Filmfare Awards South	Best Director – Telugu	Nominated	
2014	Race Gurram	SIIMA Award	Best Director (Telugu)	Won	
