= Brahmanandam filmography =

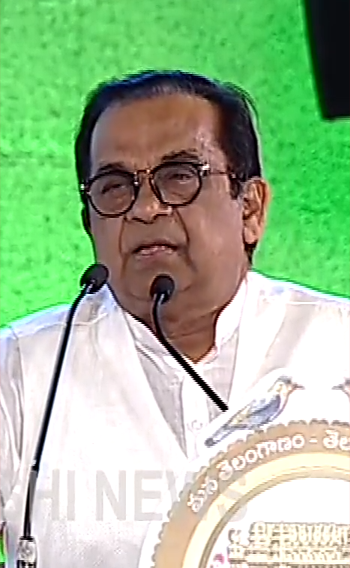

Brahmanandam is an Indian actor and comedian working mostly in Telugu films. He currently holds the Guinness World Record for the most screen credits being a living actor. In 2009, he was honoured with the Padma Shri, for his contribution to Indian cinema. Brahmanandam was part of the television quiz show Brahmi 1 million Show on I-News. He appeared in more than 1500 (one thousand five hundred) films. He also been as a judge in the 2018 Telugu Television Stand-up comedy show, The Great Telugu Laughter Challenge.

== Telugu films ==
Key
†	Denotes films that have not yet been released

=== As an actor ===
List of Brahmanandam Telugu film acting credits
Year	Title	Role	Notes	Ref.
1986	Chantabbai			
1987	Chakravarthy			
1987	Pasivadi Pranam			
1987	Swayamkrushi	Cobbler		
1987	Aha Naa-Pellanta	Ara Gundu		
1987	Raaga Leela			
1987	Satyagraham			
1988	Rakhtabhishekam			
1988	Yuddha Bhoomi			
1988	Chinababu	Panakaalu		
1988	Sri Tatavatharam			
1988	Swarnakamalam			
1988	Neeku Naaku Pellanta			
1988	Rao Gari Illu	Tufan Baba		
1988	Janaki Ramudu	Rangam Singaraju		
1988	Marana Mrudangam			
1988	Trinetrudu			
1988	Rudraveena	Kishtappa		
1988	Chikkadu Dorakadu			
1988	Chinni Krishnudu			
1988	Choopulu Kalasina Subhavela			
1988	Donga Kollu	Eragandam Apparao		
1988	Vivaha Bhojanambu			
1988	Nyayam Kosam	Brahmanandam		
1988	Maharajasri Mayagadu			
1989	Bhale Donga	Surendra's henchman		
1989	Tataiah Pelli Manavadi Shobhanam			
1989	Rajakeeya Chadarangam			
1989	Ontari Poratam	Bangarayya		
1989	Agni	Sahayam		
1989	Attaku Yamudu Ammayiki Mogudu	Brahmanandam		
1989	Paape Maa Pranam	Lawyer Pappu Annarao		
1989	Two Town Rowdy	Shakthi's Friend		
1989	Muddula Mavayya			
1989	Jayammu Nischayammu Raa	Gopalam, House Owner.		
1989	Manchi Varu Maavaru			
1989	Bandhuvulostunnaru Jagratha	Bandhu Murthy		
1989	Rudranetra			
1989	Lankeswarudu			
1989	Dhruva Nakshatram	Thief		
1989	Prema	Gambler		
1989	Bava Bava Panneeru	Servant		
1989	Hai Hai Nayaka	Patel Master		
1989	Muthyamantha Muddu	S.I. Viswanatham		
1989	Bamma Maata Bangaru Baata	Lawyer Keerti		
1989	Joo Laka Taka	S.I. Chithapikkala Pattabhiramayya		
1989	Oorantha Golanta	Vamanavatharam		
1989	Artha Nadham	Film Director		
1989	Bhale Dampathulu			
1989	Pula Rangadu			
1990	Mamasri	Secretary Kanaka Rao		
1990	Mahajananiki Maradalu Pilla			
1990	Kodama Simham			
1990	Kokila			
1990	Padmavathi Kalyanam			
1990	Raja Vikramarka	Janaki (Jackey)		
1990	Prema Zindabad			
1990	Bobbili Raja	Forest Officer		
1990	Lorry Driver	Dumbu		
1990	Papa Kosam			
1990	Jagadeka Veerudu Athiloka Sundari	Vichitra Kumar, photographer.		
1990	Chevilo Puvvu	Anjineelu		
1990	Sahasa Putrudu			
1990	Sathruvu	Constable Sambayya		
1990	Qaidi Dada			
1990	Rao Gari Intlo Rowdy			
1990	Prema Khaidi			
1990	Rowdyism Nasinchali			
1990	Mama Alludu			
1990	Maa Inti Katha			
1990	Idem Pellam Baboi	Dasharatharamayya		
1990	Doshi Nirdoshi			
1990	Prananiki Pranam	Brahmanandam		
1990	Kondaveeti Donga	Head Constable		
1990	Silasasanam			
1991	Amma	TV performer		
1991	Rowdy Alludu			
1991	Intlo Pilli Vedhilo Puli			
1991	Viyyala Vari Vindhu			
1991	Coolie No. 1	Nagoji		
1991	Amma Rajinama			
1991	Sarpa Yagam			
1991	Tharaka Prabhuni Deeksha Mahimalu			
1991	Athma Bandham			
1991	Kshana Kshanam	Store Manager		
1991	Super Express	Railway Official		
1991	Naa Pellam Naa Ishtam	Tea Stall owner		
1991	Assembly Rowdy	Shivaji's uncle		
1991	Rowdy Gaari Pellam	Murthy, Hotel owner.		
1991	Prema Entha Madhuram	Siva		
1991	Chitram Bhalare Vichitram			
1991	Srisaila Bhramarambika Kataksham			
1991	Keechu Raallu			
1991	Aditya 369	Scientist		
1991	Stuartpuram Police Station			
1991	Kalikaalam			
1991	Talli Tandrulu			
1992	Donga Police	Paramanandam		
1992	Appula Appa Rao	Sastri		
1992	Venkanna Babu			
1992	Dabbu Bhale Jabbu			
1992	Yugala Geetham			
1992	Gangwar			
1992	Aapadbandhavudu	Madhava's friend		
1992	Chittemma Mogudu			
1992	Subba Rayudi Pelli			
1992	Brahma	Vankaya		
1992	President Gari Pellam			
1992	Chanti	Subbayya		
1992	Champion			
1992	Samarpana			
1992	Rowdy Inspector	L.K. Balu		
1992	Rakhta Tharpanam			
1992	Pellaniki Premalekha Priyuraliki Subhalekha	Lakshman Rao		
1992	Bhale Khaideelu			
1992	Balarama Krishnulu			
1992	Adhrushtam			
1992	Pattudala			
1992	Seetharatnam Gari Abbayi			
1992	Parvathalu Panakalu			
1992	Akka Mogudu			
1992	Babai Hotel	Rama Chandra Moorti		
1992	420	Mammootty		
1992	Allari Mogudu	Satyam		
1992	Joker Mama Super Alludu	Anand		
1992	Prema Drohi			
1992	Ahankari			
1992	Aswamedham	Sivanandam		
1992	Aa Okkati Adakku	Addi Pulla Rao, Secretary.		
1992	College Bullodu			
1992	Gharana Mogudu	Albithar Appanna, Rickshaw driver.		
1992	Pachani Samsaram			
1992	Killer	S.I. Brahmanandam		
1992	Sundarakanda	Student		
1992	Pranadaata			
1993	Konguchatu Krishnudu			
1993	Repati Rowdy			
1993	Anna Chellelu			
1993	Inspector Aswini			
1993	Kokkarokoo			
1993	Kankana Baghya			
1993	Nakshatra Poratam			
1993	Mutha Mestri	Coolie		
1993	Major Chandrakanth			
1993	Kalachakram			
1993	Abbaigaru	Obayya, Servant.		
1993	Varasudu	MSM (Moola Shanka Master)		
1993	Rakshana			
1993	Allari Alludu			
1993	Sarasaala Soggadu	Krishnamurthy		
1993	Allari Priyudu	Bitragunta Bilahari		
1993	Naga Jyothi			
1993	Pellama Majaka	Soori Babu		
1993	Manavarali Pelli	Bucchi Babu		
1993	Kannayya Kittayya	Narada		
1993	Bangaru Bullodu	Prisoner		
1993	Ish Gup Chup			
1993	Jamba Lakidi Pamba	Anandam		
1993	Ladies Special	Brahmanandam		
1993	Mayalodu	Police Inspector		
1993	Mechanic Alludu	Babji, Mechanic.		
1993	Money	Khan Dada		
1993	Rowdy Gari Teacher			
1993	Parugo Parugu	Simha Swapnam		
1993	Pekata Papa Rao	Constable Neelakantam		
1993	Prema Chitram Pelli Vichitram			
1993	Rajendrudu Gajendrudu	Bank Manager		
1993	Mama Kodalu			
1993	Anna Vadina			
1993	Amma Koduku			
1993	Kunti Putrudu			
1993	Alibaba Aradajanu Dongalu	One of 6 thieves		
1993	Evandi Aavida Vachindi			
1993	Pelli Gola			
1993	Enti Bava Mareenu			
1993	Tholi Muddhu	Veterinary doctor		
1993	Shabash Ramu			
1993	Urmila			
1994	Ammayi Kapuram			
1994	Police Alludu	Gavarraju		
1994	Mugguru Monagallu	Assistant to the Dancer		
1994	Palnati Pourusham	Chinna Paleru		
1994	Kurradhi Kurradu	Accha Rao		
1994	Kishkindha Kanda			
1994	Aame	Pellila Peraiyya, Priest.		
1994	Money Money	Khan Dada		
1994	Allari Premikudu	Ahobilam/Khan Dada		
1994	Kurradi Krishnudu			
1994	Criminal			
1994	Punya Bhoomi Naa Desam			
1994	Bangaru Kutumbam			
1994	Brahmachari Mogudu	Gurnadham,		
1994	Gandeevam	Ram Babu		
1994	Gangmaster			
1994	Hello Brother	Kaasi		
1994	Number One			
1994	Boy Friend			
1994	Pelli Koduku			
1994	Subhalagnam			
1994	Yamaleela	Chitragupta		
1994	Top Hero	S.I. Satya Murthy		
1994	Super Police			
1994	Pacha Thoranam			
1994	Maga Rayudu			
1994	Gharana Alludu			
1994	Theerpu	Jogiraju		
1994	Yes Nenante Nene	Bujjabbayi		
1994	Bobbili Simham	Papayya		
1994	Angarakshakudu			
1994	Raithu Bharatam			
1994	Presidentgari Alludu	Dance Master		
1994	Muddula Priyudu	Gundu		
1994	Allarodu			
1994	Anna			
1994	Bhale Mavayya			
1994	Bhale Pellam			
1994	Atha Kodallulu			
1994	Bhairava Dweepam			
1994	Mugguru Monagallu			
1994	Lucky Chance	Dakshina Murthy		
1995	Subhamasthu	Edukondalu		
1995	Street Fighter	Babu Rao		
1995	Sisindri	Jailor		
1995	Gharana Bullodu			
1995	Alluda Majaka	Abbulu / Ms. Dakota		
1995	Rikshavodu	One of the rickshaw guys		
1995	Mayadari Kutumbam			
1995	Taj Mahal			
1995	Raja Simham	Ashirvadam		
1995	Big Boss			
1995	Super Mogudu			
1995	Miss 420			
1995	Aadaalla Majaka			
1995	Telugu Veera Levara	Koti		
1995	Pokiri Raja	Raja		
1995	Rambantu			
1995	Alibaba Adbhuta Deepam	Dikshith the Don and Dikshith the priest	Double Role	
1995	Ketu Duplicate	Hare Ram		
1995	Adavi Dora			
1995	Pedarayudu	Dhanush		
1995	Madya Taragati Mahabharatham			
1995	Rendu Krishnudu			
1995	Guntur Gundamma Katha			
1995	Mister Mayagadu			
1995	Vajram			
1995	Maya Bazaar			
1995	Amma Donga			
1995	Aayanaki Iddaru	Nageshwara Rao		
1995	Lingababu Love Story			
1995	Aunty			
1995	Leader			
1995	Lady Boss			
1995	Love Game			
1995	Errodu			
1995	Chinnabbulu			
1995	Dear Brother			
1996	Sahanam	Brahmam		
1996	Pelli Sandadi	N.V. Krishna		
1996	Mummy Mee Aayanochadu			
1996	Jagadeka Veerudu			
1996	Maavichiguru	Head clerk		
1996	Pittala Dora			
1996	Bombay Priyudu	Bombay		
1996	Puttinti Gowravam			
1996	Sarada Bullodu	Brahmam		
1996	Nayudu Gari Kutumbam	Dr. Muduru Pichayya		
1996	Prema Prayanam			
1996	Kranthi			
1996	Pavitra Bandham	Brahmam		
1996	Pellala Rajyam			
1996	Oho Naa Pellanta	Armugam		
1996	Topi Raja Sweety Roja	Brahmam		
1996	Amma Nanna Kavali			
1996	Amma Durgamma			
1996	Ammaleni Puttillu			
1996	Bobbili Bullodu			
1996	Vinodam	Thief		
1996	Intlo Illalu Vantintlo Priyuralu	Giri		
1996	Akkada Ammayi Ikkada Abbayi	Pilaka Govinda Sastry, Telugu Lecturer.		
1996	Thatha Manavadu			
1996	Soggadi Pellam	Panakalu		
1996	Little Soldiers	Gun		
1996	Sahasa Veerudu Sagara Kanya			
1996	Akka! Bagunnava?			
1996	Dharma Chakram			
1996	Adhirindhi Alludu			
1996	Merupu			
1996	Sampradayam	'Malish' Mallayya		
1996	Gunshot			
1996	Vamsanikokkadu	Appaji		
1996	Anaganaga Oka Roju	Michael Jackson		
1997	Hitler	Appala Konda		
1997	Korukunna Priyudu			
1997	Super Heroes			
1997	Veedevadandi Babu			
1997	Muddula Mogudu	Saidulu		
1997	Peddannayya	Principal		
1997	Subhakankshalu			
1997	Adavilo Anna			
1997	Taraka Ramudu			
1997	Thaali			
1997	Chilakkottudu	Broker Brahmanandam		
1997	Annamayya	Pandit		
1997	Oka Chinna Maata	Roadside businessman		
1997	Mama Bagunnava			
1997	Pattukondi Chudaam			
1997	Kurralla Rajyam			
1997	Jai Bajarangabhali	Eekambaram		
1997	Pelli			
1997	Abbayigari Pelli			
1997	Vammo Vatto O Pellaamo			
1997	Ayyinda Leda	James Bond 555		
1997	Gokulamlo Seeta	SI Brahmam		
1997	Dongaata			
1997	Collector Garu			
1997	Pelli Chesukundam	Brahmam		
1997	Priya O Priya	Lecturer		
1997	Priyaragalu	Anandam		
1997	Kaliyugamlo Gandargolam			
1997	Aahvaanam			
1997	Master			
1997	Osi Naa Maradala			
1997	Egire Paavurama			
1998	Kanyadanam			
1998	Andaru Herole			
1998	Life Lo Wife			
1998	Ganesh	Sub-Jailor Kondal Rao		
1998	Asala Sandadi			
1998	Gilli Kahjalu			
1998	Deergha Sumangali Bhava	Kotayya's son		
1998	Kodukulu			
1998	Panduga			
1998	Kante Koothurne Kanu			
1998	Aavida Maa Aavide	Head Constable Ramakoti		
1998	Greeku Veerudu			
1998	Mee Aayana Jagartha			
1998	Srimathi Vellostha	Dippa Brahmam		
1998	Ooyala			
1998	All Rounder			
1998	Love Story 1999			
1998	Yuvarathna Rana			
1998	Premante Idera	Avadhani		
1998	Rayudu			
1998	Paradesi			
1998	Bavagaru Bagunnara?	Gopal		
1998	Choodalani Vundi	House owner		
1998	Suryavamsam	Doctor		
1998	Maavidaakulu	Lavangam		
1998	Gamyam	Bapineedu's P.A.		
1998	O Panaipothundi Babu	Inspector Agni and Kadiyam Suryakantham	Dual roles	
1998	Subhavartha			
1998	Subhalekhalu			
1998	Rajahamsa			
1998	Pelladi Chupista			
1998	Auto Driver			
1998	Nenu Premisthunnanu			
1999	Samarasimha Reddy	Kotilingam		
1999	Velugu Needalu			
1999	Iddaru Mitrulu			
1999	Seenu			
1999	Raja Kumarudu	Policeman		
1999	Rajasthan		Partially reshot version	
1999	Maa Balaji	Penchalayya		
1999	Neti Gandhi			
1999	Alludugaaru Vachcharu			
1999	Hello...Yama!	SI Dharmapetam		
1999	Bobbili Vamsham			
1999	Sultan	Anji		
1999	Preminche Manasu			
1999	Pilla Nachindi	Gottam Gopala Krishna.		
1999	Preyasi Raave			
1999	Film Nagar			
1999	Raja	Delhi Dada		
1999	Manikyam			
1999	Thammudu	Avadhanulu		
1999	Preminchedi Endukamma			
1999	Yamajathakudu	Pitapuram		
1999	Anaganaga Oka Ammai			
1999	Sneham Kosam			
1999	Sri Ramulayya			
1999	Swapnalokam			
1999	Vichitram	Kapiraju		
1999	Premaku Velayera	Anandam		
1999	Mechanic Mavayya			
1999	Surya Putrika			
2000	Chiru Navvutho			
2000	Sivaji			
2000	Sakutumba Saparivaara Sametam			
2000	Prema Kosam			
2000	Pelli Sambandham			
2000	Sardukupodaam Randi			
2000	Ammo! Okato Tareekhu			
2000	Ninne Premistha			
2000	Rayalaseema Ramanna Chowdary	Annavaram		
2000	Moodu Mukkalaata			
2000	Badri	Gangaraju		
2000	Pelli Sambandham			
2000	Uncle	Desikacheri		
2000	Vamsi	Jackal		
2000	Kalisundam Raa	Ramavadhani		
2000	Hands Up!	Jagan		
2000	Tirumala Tirupati Venkatesa	Tirumala		
2000	Aaro Pranam			
2000	Azad	Thief		
2000	Kodanda Ramudu			
2000	Jayam Manadera	Krupakaram		
2000	Yuvaraju			
2000	Nuvvu Vastavani	Nikar Narayana		
2000	Manasu Paddanu Kaani			
2000	Kshemamga Velli Labhamga Randi	Jembulingam		
2000	Annayya			
2000	Sri Srimati Satyabhama			
2000	Postman			
2000	Real Story			
2000	Manasunna Maaraju			
2000	NTR Nagar			
2000	Maa Pelliki Randi			
2001	Jabili			
2001	Athanu			
2001	Chiranjeevulu			
2001	Chinnodu			
2001	Eduruleni Manishi			
2001	Subhaseessulu			
2001	Snehamante Idera	Bhavani Shankar		
2001	Sri Raja Rajeswari			
2001	Deevinchandi			
2001	Ide Naa Modati Prema Lekha			
2001	Simharasi			
2001	Chirujallu			
2001	Naa Manasistha Raa			
2001	Subbu			
2001	Hanuman Junction			
2001	Chinna	Army officer		
2001	Ammaye Navvithe	DD		
2001	Veedekkadi Mogudandi?			
2001	Ramma Chilakamma	Brahmanandam and Police officer	Dual roles	
2001	Nuvvu Naaku Nachav	Photographer		
2001	Prema Sandadi	Samara Simha Reddy		
2001	Adhipathi	S.I. Pathodi		
2001	Family Circus	Dr. Anand		
2001	Chandu			
2001	Cheppalani Vundhi			
2001	Vechivunta			
2001	Bhalevadivi Basu	Cook Bhima Rao		
2001	Anandam	House owner.		
2001	Sri Manjunatha	Nandeeswarudu		
2001	Narasimha Naidu	Sastry		
2001	Kalisi Naduddam			
2001	Mrugaraju	Assistant Guard		
2001	Repallelo Radha			
2001	Student No.1	Dr. Brahmanandam		
2001	Thank You Subba Rao			
2001	Apparao Ki Oka Nela Thappindi			
2001	Maa Aavida Meeda Ottu Mee Aavida Chala Manchidi			
2001	Lady Bachelors			
2001	Dadagiri			
2001	Ammo Bomma			
2001	Bhadrachalam			
2001	Siddhu			
2001	Loyola College			
2001	Akka Bavekkada			
2002	Sahasa Baludu Vichitra Kothi	Simhadri the pickpocket		
2002	Manmadhudu	Suri Babu Lavangam		
2002	Hai			
2002	Nuvvu Leka Nenu Lenu	Purohitudu		
2002	Nenu Ninnu Premistunnanu			
2002	Dreams			
2002	Joruga Husharuga			
2002	Ramana	Gundusoodi Seenu		
2002	Lagna Patrika	Head Constable Brahmam		
2002	Nee Premakai	Srinivas' uncle		
2002	Police Sisters			
2002	Raghava			
2002	Friends	Boxer Baba		
2002	Neetho Cheppalani			
2002	Entha Bagundo			
2002	Lahiri Lahiri Lahirilo			
2002	Aaduthu Paaduthu			
2002	Vendi Mabbulu			
2002	Santosham	Giri from Mangalgiri		
2002	Tappu Chesi Pappu Koodu	Lawyer		
2002	Parasuram	Mentally challenged patient		
2002	Adrustam	Valmiki		
2002	Neetho			
2002	Manasutho			
2002	Allari Ramudu			
2002	Bharatasimha Reddy			
2002	Chennakesava Reddy	Purohitudu		
2002	Amma			
2002	Gemini	Car Mechanic		
2002	2 Much			
2002	Eeswar	Priest		
2002	Apuroopam			
2002	Thotti Gang	Gaali Gottam Govinda Sastry / Sastry's grandmother		
2002	Premalo Pavani Kalyan			
2002	Sandade Sandadi	Poolan Raja		
2002	Siva Rama Raju	Puliraju		
2002	Bobby	Ammiraju old B.A.		
2002	Indra	Pandit		
2002	O Chinnadana	Hyderabad		
2002	Seema Simham	Bhadrachalam		
2002	Sivani			
2003	Satyam	Lingam		
2003	Vishnu			
2003	Neetho Vastha			
2003	Indiramma	Litigation Sastry		
2003	Maa Alludu Very Good	Variety Pullayya		
2003	Ottesi Cheputunna			
2003	Dhanush			
2003	Oka Raju Oka Rani	Sachin		
2003	Priyadarshini			
2003	Ottu Ee Ammayevaro Thelidu			
2003	Nenu Seetamahalakshmi			
2003	Simhadri	Talupulu		
2003	Uthsaham			
2003	Golmaal	Kokila		
2003	Ori Nee Prema Bangaram Kaanu			
2003	Ninne Ishtapaddanu	Fellow passenger on train		
2003	Toli Choopulone			
2003	Sriramachandrulu	Rambabu		
2003	Neeke Manasichaanu	The man obsessed with Namaskaram		
2003	Seetayya			
2003	Ammulu			
2003	Gangotri	Hindi lecturer		
2003	Pellamtho Panenti			
2003	Neeku Nenu Naaku Nuvvu	Priest		
2003	Aayudham			
2003	Vijayam	Vanari		
2003	Aadanthe Ado Type			
2003	Dongodu	Sastry		
2003	Chantigadu			
2003	Raghavendra	Sirisha's brother		
2003	Kabaddi Kabaddi	Gochi Baba		
2003	Fools			
2003	Ela Cheppanu			
2003	Oka Radha Iddaru Krishnula Pelli			
2003	Pellam Oorelithe	Bell boy, in Hotel.		
2003	Tiger Harischandra Prasad			
2003	Dham	Shankara Sastry		
2003	Avuna			
2004	Swarabhishekam			
2004	Apparao Driving School	Losugula Lakshma Reddy		
2004	Mee Intikoste Yem Istaru Maa Intikoste Yem Testaru			
2004	Monalisa	Dr. Thikkavar Thikkamaka Reddy M.B.B.S.	partially reshot version	
2004	Suryam	Pujari		
2004	Gudumba Shankar	Parabrahma Swamy		
2004	Andhrawala	Home Minister		
2004	Konchem Touchlo Vunte Cheputanu			
2004	Intlo Srimathi Veedhilo Kumari			
2004	Leela Mahal Center	Singhamalai		
2004	Ammayi Bagundi			
2004	Vidyardhi			
2004	Vijayendra Varma			
2004	Valliddaru Okkate			
2004	Mr & Mrs Sailaja Krishnamurthy			
2004	Satruvu			
2004	Athade Oka Sainyam	Prakash Rao's P.A.		
2004	Seenu Vasanthi Lakshmi	Music Pundit		
2004	143			
2004	Soggadi Saradalu			
2004	Venky	Gajala from Washington D.C.		
2004	Pellikani Pellam			
2004	Kaasi			
2004	Nenunnanu	Manmadha Rao		
2004	Okatavudam			
2004	Preminchukunnam Pelliki Randi			
2004	Naani	Satyam		
2004	Shiva Shankar			
2004	Adavi Ramudu			
2004	Oka Pellam Muddu Rendo Pellam Vaddu			
2004	Aithe Enti			
2004	Xtra			
2004	Koduku			
2004	Swamy			
2004	Pallakilo Pellikoothuru			
2004	Swetha Naagu			
2004	Enjoy			
2004	Vallidhari Vayasu Padaharelle!			
2004	Dost			
2004	Andaru Dongale Dorikite	Chee		
2004	Swetha Naagu			
2005	Jai Chiranjeeva	Shanthi Swaroop		
2005	Danger	Brahmam		
2005	Evadi Gola Vaadidhi	Sankardada R.M.P.		
2005	Hungama	P.A. of Bobbili Raja		
2005	Relax	Aavalu		
2005	Mogudu Pellam O Dongodu	Thief		
2005	Ayodhya			
2005	Dhairyam			
2005	Subash Chandra Bose	Balram		
2005	Slokam			
2005	Gowtam SSC			
2005	Sravanamasam	one of the Navratnas		
2005	Modati Cinema			
2005	Pourusham			
2005	Allari Bullodu			
2005	Keelu Gurram			
2005	786 Khaidi Premakatha	Changala Rayudu		
2005	Bhageeratha	Hotel manager		
2005	Ayindha Leda			
2005	Naa Alludu			
2005	Beets			
2005	Chakram	Railway T.C.		
2005	Adirindayya Chandram			
2005	Vennela	Pachadla paramanandam alias pampachek, Restaurant owner.		
2005	Athadu	Krishna Murthy		
2005	Super	Lie-Detector Operator		
2005	Andarivaadu	P. Kishore Babu alias P.K. Babu, Creative Director in Media Channel.		
2005	Soggadu	Servant of Satyannarayana		
2005	Radha Gopalam			
2005	Balu	Hotel Manager		
2005	Allari Bullodu			
2005	Seenugadu Chiranjeevi Fan			
2005	Sri			
2005	Premikulu			
2005	Athanokkade			
2005	Veerabhadra			
2005	Swami Shankar			
2005	Oka Oorilo			
2005	Good Boy			
2005	Orey Pandu			
2005	Narasimhudu			
2005	Kanchanamala Cable TV			
2005	Sankharavam			
2005	Political Rowdy			
2005	Rambha Neeku Oorvasi Naaku			
2006	Khatarnak	Phillips		
2006	Annavaram	Purohitudu		
2006	Pagale Vennela			
2006	Andala Ramudu			
2006	Chinnodu			
2006	Nanna Aa Pille Kavali			
2006	Gopi – Goda Meeda Pilli	Sampurnam		
2006	Nee Navve Chalu			
2006	Bommarillu	Loan Officer		
2006	Rajababu			
2006	Vikramarkudu	Duvva Abbulu		
2006	Party	Dr. Rajendra Prasad / John Abraham		
2006	Ashok			
2006	Brahmastram			
2006	Shock			
2006	Pellaina Kothalo			
2006	Boss	Abhay		
2006	Photo			
2006	Stalin	Purohitudu		
2006	Sri Krishna 2006			
2006	Rakhi	TV Channel Owner		
2006	Pokiri	Brahmi Software Engineer		
2006	Maa Iddari Madhya			
2006	Sri Ramadasu	Astrologer		
2006	Raam	Dr. Chakravarthi		
2006	Veedhi			
2006	Happy	Appala Naidu, Pizza spot owner.		
2006	Sarada Saradaga	Kona		
2006	Game	Raghava's boss		
2006	Indian Beauty	Himself		
2006	Tata Birla Madhyalo Laila	Police officer		
2006	Neeku Naaku	College professor		
2007	Aata	Astrologer		
2007	Raju Bhai			
2007	Aaroje			
2007	Bhookailas			
2007	Athidhi	Shivram		
2007	Konte Kurrallu			
2007	Godava	College Principal		
2007	Operation Duryodhana			
2007	Aadavari Matalaku Arthale Verule			
2007	Bhajantrilu			
2007	Brahma - The Creator			
2007	Chirutha	Krish, Ship owner in Bangkok.		
2007	Dubai Seenu	Rama Krishna		
2007	Dhee	Srirangam Seshadri Chary		
2007	Lakshyam	College Canteen Owner		
2007	Poramboku			
2007	Maharajasri			
2007	Yamagola Malli Modalayindi			
2007	Maisamma IPS	Minister		
2007	Mee Sreyobhilashi	Panthulu		
2007	Chandrahas			
2007	Athili Sattibabu LKG	Ravi Shastri		
2007	Ramudu Manchu Baludu			
2007	Okkadunnadu	Satyanarayana, auditor.		
2007	Satyabhama			
2007	Shankar Dada Zindabad	Astrologer		
2007	Bhagyalakshmi Bumper Draw	Joshua Gottam		
2007	Hello Premistara			
2007	Vijayadasami			
2007	Bahumati			
2007	Nava Vasantham			
2007	Aadivaram Aadavallaku Selavu			
2007	Yamadonga	Chitraguptudu		
2007	Bangaru Konda			
2007	Pagale Vennela			
2008	King	Jayasurya, Music director		
2008	Adhyakshaa			
2008	Neninthe	Idli Vishwanath, Film Director.		
2008	Andariki Vandanalu			
2008	Chedugudu			
2008	Lakshmi Putrudu		Partially reshot in Telugu	
2008	Dongala Bandi	McMillon Murthy		
2008	Blade Babji			
2008	Deepavali	Bunny		
2008	Kousalya Supraja Rama			
2008	Subham			
2008	Kotha Bangaru Lokam	Paul, College Principal.		
2008	Sindhuri			
2008	Ninna Nedu Repu	Houseowner		
2008	Chintakayala Ravi	Pinky, Bar owner		
2008	Nesthama			
2008	Baladoor	Nani		
2008	Salute	Transport office broker		
2008	Gajibiji			
2008	Aalayam			
2008	Kathanayakudu	Koya Dora		
2008	Ullasamga Utsahamga	Colony Secretary / Peter		
2008	Maa Ayana Chanti Pilladu			
2008	Hare Ram	Nijam		
2008	Victory	R. Appa Rao		
2008	Ready	Mcdowell's Murthy, auditor.		
2008	Pandurangadu			
2008	Kantri	Brahmi		
2008	Naa Manasukemaindi			
2008	Donga Sachinollu	Stalin		
2008	Bhale Dongalu	Vengala Rao		
2008	Sawaal			
2008	Jalsa	Pranav		
2008	Premabhishekam			
2008	Bhadradri			
2008	Nagaram	Mani		
2008	Sangamam			
2008	Gamyam	Person on a highway		
2008	Krishnarjuna	Jyotish Brahmanandam Parmanandgaru		
2008	Nenu Meeku Telusa?	Barmani		
2008	Mr. Medhavi			
2008	Pourudu	Church Father Anthony		
2008	Krishna	Bobby		
2008	100 Kotlu			
2008	Brahmanandam Drama Company	Anandam		
2008	Bommana Brothers Chandana Sisters			
2008	John Appa Rao 40 Plus			
2008	Nee Sukhame Ne Koruthunna	Madhu's friend and his brother	Dual roles	
2008	Hero	Sr. Member at Police Training Academy		
2009	Prayanam	Satyanarayana Swamy		
2009	Kasko	Mahesh Babu		
2009	Saleem			
2009	Pravarakhyudu	Lecturer		
2009	Naa Style Veru	Appachan		
2009	Bumper Offer	Viswanath		
2009	A Aa E Ee			
2009	Snehituda...			
2009	Ride			
2009	Prayanam	Satyanarayana Swamy		
2009	Arya 2	Mr. Dasavathaaram		
2009	Ek Niranjan	Tantra		
2009	Jayeebhava	Narasimha Sastry		
2009	Mahatma	English Professor		
2009	Ganesh	Yadagiri		
2009	Josh	Durga's P.A.		
2009	Sweet Heart			
2009	Mallanna	Kobarikayala Subbayya	partially reshot in Telugu	
2009	Anjaneyulu	Prabhakar		
2009	Magadheera	Indu's neighbour		
2009	Evaraina Epudaina	Kutumba Rao		
2009	Srisailam			
2009	Current			
2009	Kick	Halwa Raj / Parugu Prakash Raj		
2009	Kirkit	Lal Baadshah		
2009	Mitrudu	JB Jan (Jaana Betthudu Janaardhan)		
2009	Masth			
2009	Junction			
2009	Adugu			
2009	Naa Girlfriend Baga Rich	Mike Tyson		
2009	Samrajyam			
2009	Rajavari Chepala Cheruvu			
2009	Samardhudu			
2009	Raju Maharaju	Om Raja		
2009	Satyameva Jayate			
2009	Malli Malli			
2009	Konchem Ishtam Konchem Kashtam	Gachibowli Diwakar		
2009	Maska	Doctor		
2009	Mental Krishna			
2010	Ragada	Brahmam Darling		
2010	Rs.999 Matrame			
2010	Nagavalli	Assistant Seenu		
2010	Mukkanti			
2010	Orange	Puppy		
2010	Prema Pilustondi			
2010	Kalyanram Kathi	Swathi Muthyam		
2010	Oka Tupaki Moodu Pittalu			
2010	Baava			
2010	Young India			
2010	Brindaavanam	Bommarillu Father		
2010	Ninnu Choosina Kshanana			
2010	Khaleja	Miriyam		
2010	Kotha Bandham			
2010	Don Seenu	Vishwas		
2010	Mondi Mogullo Penki Pellalu			
2010	Panchakshari	Kala Bhairava		
2010	Emaindhi Naalo			
2010	Jhummandi Naadam			
2010	Holidays			
2010	Vedam	Brother Bairagi		
2010	9th Class C/o Eleshwaram			
2010	Rama Rama Krishna Krishna	Lechipoyina Subba Rao (LSR)		
2010	Buridi			
2010	Simha	Compounder		
2010	Comedy Express			
2010	Maa Annayya Bangaram	Thief		
2010	Varudu	Dilip Raja		
2010	Taj Mahal	Fake father to hostel boys		
2010	Chalaki			
2010	Collector Gari Bharya			
2010	Yagam			
2010	Visu			
2010	Kedi	Six Feet		
2010	Bindaas	Parabrahmam		
2010	Sare Nee Istam			
2010	Namo Venkatesa	Paris Prasad		
2010	Gudu Gudu Gunjam			
2010	Seeta Ramula Kalyanam Lankalo	Appalaraju / Pappalaraju		
2010	Adhurs	Bhattacharya (Bhattu)		
2010	Maa Nanna Chiranjeevi	Mani Ratnam (Don)		
2011	Panjaa	Paparayudu		
2011	Mugguru	Chota Don		
2011	Seema Tapakai	Melimbangaram		
2011	Madatha Kaja	Padmasri		
2011	Sri Rama Rajyam	Tippadu		
2011	Bejawada	Sketch Gopi		
2011	Veedu Theda	Banana Baba		
2011	Dookudu	Padmasri / Singapore Rajeswara Rao / Champak Seth		
2011	Money Money, More Money	Khan Dada		
2011	Kandireega	Fake Bhavani		
2011	Dhada			
2011	Badrinath	Batting Baba		
2011	Veera	Tiger		
2011	Desadrohii			
2011	Mr. Rascal	Balu		
2011	Daggaraga Dooranga	Johnny		
2011	Mr. Perfect	Jalsa Kishore		
2011	Shakthi	Avatar		
2011	Prema Kavali	Serlingam Software Engineer		
2011	Katha Screenplay Darsakatvam Appalaraju	Sri Sailam Anna		
2011	Gaganam	Rajesh Kapoor (Film Director)		
2011	Wanted	Nandagopal "Nandu"		
2011	Dongala Mutha	Narayana Murthy / The Ghost		
2011	Vastadu Naa Raju			
2011	Brahmi Gadi Katha	Brahmi		
2011	Anaganaga O Dheerudu	Jaffa		
2011	Aha Naa Pellanta!	Balaraju		
2012	Lucky			
2012	Cameraman Gangatho Rambabu	Bobby		
2012	Julayi	Brahmam		
2012	Krishnam Vande Jagadgurum	Rampam (Rangasthala Pandit)		
2012	Rebel	Narasa Raju		
2012	Denikaina Ready	Bangaraju		
2012	Vennela 1½	Papachand		
2012	Shirdi Sai	Sandeham		
2012	Sudigadu	Jaffa Reddy		
2012	All the Best	Gochi Savithri		
2012	Endukante... Premanta!	Pandu Ranga Rao		
2012	Racha	Rangeela Master		
2012	Naa Ishtam	Kadiyam Bujji		
2012	Devudu Chesina Manushulu	Lord Vishnu / Brahmanandam		
2012	Gabbar Singh	Recovery Ranjith Kumar		
2012	Dammu	Jaanaki		
2012	Adhinayakudu	Brahmi		
2012	Daruvu	Vidhya Balan		
2012	Mythri	Murthy		
2012	Nuvvekkadunte Nenakkadunta	Advocate		
2012	Damarukam	Rudraksha		
2012	Nuvva Nena	Aaku Bhai		
2012	Mr. Nookayya	Rahul		
2012	Nippu	Kaasi		
2012	Dhoni	Subramaniam's Boss		
2013	Bullabbai			
2013	Seethamma Vakitlo Sirimalle Chettu	Deleted Scenes		
2013	Baadshah	Padmanabha Simha		
2013	Something Something	Premji		
2013	Saradaga Ammayitho			
2013	Masala			
2013	Bhai	Vikram Donor		
2013	Backbench Student	Kareena Kapoor		
2013	Greeku Veerudu	Kamaraju		
2013	Iddarammayilatho	"Fiddle" Brahma		
2013	Attarintiki Daredi	Baddam Bhaskar		
2013	Chukkalanti Ammayi Chakkanaina Abbayi			
2013	Jaffa	Jasmine Falguda (Jaffa)		
2013	Doosukeltha	Veera Brahmam		
2013	Mirchi	Veera Pratap		
2013	Balupu	Crazy Mohan		
2013	Okkadine	Sodhan		
2013	Jagan Nirdoshi			
2013	Naayak	Jilebi		
2013	Sevakudu	Brahmi		
2013	Police Game			
2013	Bunny n Cherry	Manikyam		
2014	Yevadu	Illegal tenant at Satya's home		
2014	Rough			
2014	Joru	PK		
2014	Erra Bus			
2014	Yamaleela 2	Chitragupta		
2014	Jaihind 2			
2014	Loukyam	Sipana Sridhar "Sippy"		
2014	Aagadu	Delhi Suri		
2014	Anukshanam	Shailaja's brother		
2014	Power	CI Animutyam		
2014	Rabhasa	Raju		
2014	Boochamma Boochodu	Charan		
2014	Geethanjali	Saitan Raj		
2014	Alludu Seenu	Dimple		
2014	Autonagar Surya	"Super Mechanic" Brahmi		
2014	Manam	Girish Karnad		
2014	Amrutham Chandamamalo			
2014	Laddu Babu			
2014	Race Gurram	Kill Bill Pandey		
2014	Legend	Manikyam		
2014	Malligadu Marriage Bureau	Chotu Bhai		
2014	Pandavulu Pandavulu Tummeda	Bapure		
2014	Heart Attack	ISKCON Ramana		
2014	Aggi Ravva		partially reshot version	
2015	Loafer	Srimanthudu		
2015	Size Zero	Android Baba		
2015	Bruce Lee: The Fighter	Suzuki Subramanyam		
2015	Bengal Tiger	Amala Paul		
2015	Akhil	Johnson & Johnson		
2015	Courier Boy Kalyan	Nasar		
2015	Kick 2	Pandit Ravi Teja		
2015	Sher	Brahmi		
2015	Jyothi Lakshmi	Kamalakar		
2015	Vinavayya Ramayya	Patel Pahilwan/Pailwan		
2015	Dongaata	Brahmi		
2015	Dohchay	Bullet Babu		
2015	Soukhyam	Daya		
2015	Cinema Choopistha Mava	Daya		
2015	Pandaga Chesko	Weekend Venkat Rao		
2015	S/O Satyamurthy	Koda Rambabu		
2015	Subramanyam for Sale	Chintakaya		
2015	Moodu Mukkallo Cheppalante	Idly Viswanath		
2015	Lava Kusa			
2016	Tulasi Dalam	Witch Doctor		
2016	Mental Police			
2016	Nayaki	Cameraman		
2016	Chuttalabbai			
2016	Aatadukundam Raa	Girija Rao		
2016	Babu Bangaram	Magic Mangamma		
2016	Sarrainodu	Linga Hariharan		
2016	Sardaar Gabbar Singh	Shekhar Singh		
2016	Shourya	Sports Minister		
2016	Krishnashtami			
2016	Garam	Mr.Google		
2016	Soggade Chinni Nayana	Athmananda Swamy		
2016	Eluka Majaka	Vidoosha Mooshika (mouse)		
2016	Jaguar	Fake Jaguar		
2017	Nenu Kidnap Ayyanu			
2017	Khaidi No. 150	Doberman		
2017	Om Namo Venkatesaya	Simhachalam		
2018	Achari America Yatra	Appalacharya		
2018	Silly Fellows	Fake DGP		
2018	Nela Ticket	Balaraju		
2018	Gayatri	Loknatham		
2018	MLA	Pattabhi		
2018	Aatagallu	Go Go		
2018	Inttelligent	Dharma Raju		
2018	Jai Simha	Raju Reddy		
2019	Amma Rajyam Lo Kadapa Biddalu	Rambabu		
2019	Gaddalakonda Ganesh			
2019	Manmadhudu 2	Suribabu Lavangam		
2019	1st Rank Raju	Manormani		
2019	NTR: Kathanayakudu	Relangi	Special appearance	
2020	Ala Vaikunthapurramuloo	Himself	Cameo in "Ramuloo Ramulaa" song	
2021	Jathi Ratnalu	Justice Balwanth Chowdhary		
2022	Bheemla Nayak	Judge K. B. Anand Rao		
2022	Aadavallu Meeku Johaarlu	Buchi		
2022	Panchathantram	Veda Vyas		
2023	Veera Simha Reddy	Ismail		
2023	Ranga Maarthaanda	Chakrapani		
2023	Veera Khadgam	B. D. Shankarnarayana	partially reshot version of Parvathipuram (2016)	
2023	Ala Ila Ela	LIC Jeevan		
2023	Bro	Shastri		
2023	Bhola Shankar	Judge	Guest appearance	
2023	Kushi	Swamiji	Guest appearance	
2023	Keedaa Cola	Varadaraju		
2023	Bubblegum	Himself	Special appearance	
2024	Kalki 2898 AD	Rajan		
2024	Darling	Raghav's manager		
2024	Purushothamudu	Police officer Naidu		
2025	Game Changer	Kalyan Sundaram		
2025	Brahma Anandam	Chilaka Ananda Murthy		
2025	Akkada Ammayi Ikkada Abbayi	Krishna’s relative		
2025	Junior	Himself	Cameo appearance in the song "Viral Vayyari"	
2025	Mithra Mandali	Himself	Cameo appearance in the song "Jambar Gimbar Lala"	
2025	Gurram Paapi Reddy	Judge Vaidyanathan		
2025	Kannappa	Pilaka		
2026	Sahakutumbaanaam	Lavangam		
2026	Om Shanti Shanti Shantihi	Judge		
2026	Mahendragiri Vaarahi	Pujari		

=== As a voice actor ===
List of Brahmanandam Telugu film voice acting credits
Year	Title	Actor	Role	Notes	Ref.
1996	Mr. Romeo	Vadivelu		Telugu dubbed versions	
1997	V. I. P.	Anu Mohan	Rangasamy	Telugu dubbed versions	
2005	Chandramukhi	Vadivelu	Murugesan	Telugu dubbed versions	
2005	Majaa	Vadivelu	Pulipaandi	Telugu dubbed versions	
2005	Aaru	Vadivelu	Sumo	Telugu dubbed versions	
2006	Himsincha Raju 23rd Pulikesi	Vadivelu	Pulikesi XXIII and Ukraputhan	Telugu dubbed versions	
2006	Pogaru	Vadivelu	Warden Vallaran	Telugu dubbed versions	
2009	Ghatikudu	Vadivelu	Bannerji	Telugu dubbed versions	
2017	Shivalinga	Vadivelu	Pattukunjam	Telugu dubbed versions	
2017	Adirindhi	Vadivelu	Vadivu	Telugu dubbed versions	
2019	The Lion King	Seth Rogen	Pumbaa	Telugu dubbed versions	
2024	Bujji and Bhairava		Rajan	Voiceovers	
2024	Veeranjaneyulu Viharayatra		Veeranjaneyulu	Voiceovers	
2024	Mufasa: The Lion King	Seth Rogen	Pumbaa	Telugu dubbed version	

=== As singer ===
List of Brahmanandam Telugu film voice singing credits
Year	Title	Song	Ref.
1990	Chevilo Puvvu	"Pichekindi Verekendi"	
1992	Chitram Bhalare Vichitram	"Brahmacharulam"	
2011	Katha Screenplay Darsakatvam Appalaraju	"Naa Peru Srisailam"	

== Tamil films ==
List of Brahmanandam Tamil film credits
Year	Title	Role	Notes	Ref.
2004	Ghilli	Ramakrishna		
2004	New	Satyam		
2007	Mozhi	Anantakrishnan		
2008	Saroja	Car passenger		
2008	Satyam	Transport office broker		
2008	Kuselan	Tribal		
2008	Netru Indru Naalai	Houseowner		
2011	Payanam	Rajesh Kapoor (Film Director)		
2012	Dhoni	Subramaniam's boss		
2014	Jilla	IPS Brahma	Deleted scene (Telugu version)	
2014	Anjaan	Guru Shastri		
2014	Jaihind 2	Ezhumalai	Uncredited role	
2014	Lingaa	Inspector Raja Varman		
2015	Vaalu	MD		
2015	Massu Engira Masilamani	Dr. Gnanaprakasham		
2016	Nayagi	Cameraman		
2017	Maragadha Naanayam	Pilot		
2018	Thaanaa Serndha Koottam	Income tax officer		
2019	Lisaa	LKG		
2020	Dagaalty	China Madan		
2020	Rocky: The Revenge	Dog trainer	Released in Telugu as Namaste Nestama	
2023	Kick	Scientist Vaali		
2024	Oru Thee	LIC Jeevan		

== Kannada films ==
List of Brahmanandam Kannada film credits
Year	Title	Role	Notes	Ref.
2014	Ninnindale	Sachin from New York Plumbing Department		
2019	I Love You	Santhosh's assistant		
2025	Junior		Cameo appearance in the song "Viral Vayyari"	

== Other language films ==
List of Brahmanandam other language film credits
Year	Title	Role	Language	Notes	Ref.
1999	Sooryavansham	Dr. P. K. Mare	Hindi		
2024	Kuch Khattaa Ho Jaay	Lucky Bhalla	Hindi		
2024	Hrashwo Deergha	Mama	Nepali		

== Television ==
List of Brahmanandam television credits
Year	Work	Role	Language	Ref.
1985	Pakapakalu		Telugu	
2018	The Great Telugu Laughter Challenge	Judge	Telugu	
2024	Bujji and Bhairava	Rajan (voice)	Telugu	
2026	Super Subbu	Madhusudan Rao	Telugu	
