= Ali filmography =

This is the filmography of Telugu film actor Ali.

== Telugu films ==
Partial list of Ali Telugu films and roles
Year	Title	Role	Notes
1979	Nindu Noorellu		Child artist
1979	Punadhirallu		Child artist
1980	Gharana Donga		Child artist
1981	Seethakoka Chiluka		Child artist
1982	Malle Pandiri	Dumbu	Child artist
1982	Devatha		Child artist
1982	Nalugu Stambalata		Child artist
1983	Nelavanka	Ali	Child artist
1983	Puttadi Bomma		Child artist
1983	Moodu Mullu	Student	Child artist
1984	Kondaveeti Nagulu	Udatha	Child artist
1984	Ooha Sundari		Child artist
1984	Dandayatra		Child artist
1984	Mukkopi		Child artist
1985	Maa Pallelo Gopaludu		Child artist
1985	Bhale Thammudu		Child artist
1985	Garjana		Child artist
1985	Siksha		Child artist
1986	Chantabbai		Child artist
1986	Karu Diddina Kapuram		Child artist
1986	Srimathi Kanuka		Child artist
1986	Magadheerudu		Child artist
1986	Pasuputhadu		Child artist
1986	Swati Mutyam		Child artist
1986	Punyasthree	Balu	Child artist
1987	Rowdy Babai		Child artist
1987	Dongodochadu		Child artist
1988	Anna Chellelu		Child artist
1988	Pelli Chesi Choodu		
1988	Menamama	Abbi gadu aka Sankara Sastry	
1988	Veguchukka Pagatichukka		
1988	Ramudu Bheemudu		
1988	Yamudiki Mogudu		
1988	Mr. Hero		
1989	Muthyamantha Muddu		
1989	Chennapatnam Chinnollu	Balu	
1989	Zoo Lakataka		
1989	Preminchi Choodu		
1989	Soggadi Kaapuram	Mastan Ali	
1990	Chevilo Puvvu		
1990	Sahasa Putrudu		
1990	Magaadu		
1991	Athiradhudu		
1991	Talli Tandrulu	Porter	
1992	Appula Appa Rao	Lottery Ticketer	
1992	Seetharatnam Gari Abbayi		
1992	420		
1992	President Gari Pellam		
1992	Thummeda		
1992	Rowdy Inspector		
1992	Laati		
1992	Prema Sikharam		
1993	Rajendrudu Gajendrudu	Chata	
1993	Tholi Muddhu		
1993	Kondapalli Raja		
1993	Donga Alludu		
1993	Paruvu Prathishta		
1993	Ish... Ghup Chup		
1993	Evandi Aavida Vachindi		
1993	Pekata Papa Rao		
1994	Hello Brother	Higaral	
1994	Gharana Alludu	Pandu	
1994	Hello Alludu		
1994	Maga Rayudu		
1994	Namaste Anna		
1994	Prema & Co		
1994	Number One		
1994	Atha Kodalu		
1994	Kishkindha Kanda		
1994	Palleturi Mogudu		
1994	Muddula Priyudu		
1994	Jailor Gaari Abbayi		
1995	Lingababu Love Story		
1995	Adavi Dora		
1995	Pokiri Raja		
1995	Ammaleni Puttillu		
1995	Raja Simham		
1995	Desa Drohulu	Alibaba and Chinababu	Double Role
1995	Aadaalla Majaka	Krishnamurthy "Kittu"	
1995	Sisindri		
1996	Vinodam	Bangaram's car driver	
1996	Ooha	Bosu	
1996	Hello Guru		
1996	Maavichiguru		
1997	Gokulamlo Seeta	Babu Rao's brother-in-law	
1997	Thoka Leni Pitta		
1997	Vammo Vatto O Pellaamo		
1998	Premante Idera	Ram Pandu	
1998	Eshwar Alla		
1998	Pavitra Prema	Simhadri	
1998	Pape Naa Pranam		
1998	Tholi Prema	Daamu	
1998	Kante Koothurne Kanu		
1998	Suprabhatam		
1998	Daddy Daddy		
1998	Abhishekam		
1999	Manasulo Maata	Guru Murthy	
1999	Swapnalokam		
1999	Swayamvaram	Thief	
1999	Anaganaga Oka Ammai		
1999	Rajasthan		partially reshot version
1999	Panchadara Chilaka		
1999	Thammudu	Malayali Manohar	
2000	Nuvvu Vastavani	Madhava	
2000	Yuvaraju	Baba Sehgal	
2000	Manasu Paddanu Kaani		
2000	Ninne Premistha		
2000	Vamsi	Vamsi's friend	
2001	Kushi	Babu Moshai	
2001	Chinna	Chinna's friend	
2001	Tholi Valapu		
2001	Devi Putrudu		
2001	Ammayi Kosam	Bachelor	
2001	Muthyam	Chanti	
2001	Snehamante Idera	Gopal	
2001	Ishtam	Kaarthik's friend	
2001	Hanuman Junction	Janagama	
2002	Vasu	Bill Gates	
2002	Maha Chandi		partially reshot version
2002	Raghava		
2002	Malli Malli Choodali	Pavan's friend	
2002	Friends	Chanti	
2002	Idiot	Rambabu	
2002	O Chinadana		
2002	Nee Premakai		
2002	Aadi		
2002	Mounamelanoyi		
2002	Tappu Chesi Pappu Koodu	Koteswara Rao's brother	
2002	Chennakesava Reddy	Shahrukh Khan	
2002	Nee Sneham	Appi Caterer	
2002	Sandade Sandadi	Divya's assistant	
2002	Premalo Pavani Kalyan		
2003	Pellam Oorelithe		
2003	Ottesi Cheputunna		
2003	Amma Nanna O Tamila Ammayi	Rambabu	
2003	Johnny	Pathan Babu Lal	
2003	Janaki Weds Sriram	Hyderabad Mikeless Jackson, Vijayawada Shah Rukh Khan Pickpocketer, Tamil Nadu Auto Janiwala	
2003	Dongodu		
2003	Aadanthe Ado Type	Surya and Krishna's friend	
2003	Sivamani	Rajinikanth	
2003	Veede	Sunny	
2004	Enjoy	Eunuch	
2004	Ammayi Bagundi	Siva's friend	
2004	Anand		
2004	Suryam		
2004	Satta		
2004	Seshadri Naidu		
2004	Seenu Vasanthi Lakshmi		
2004	Intlo Srimathi Veedhilo Kumari		
2004	Shiva Shankar	Hotel owner	
2004	143		
2004	Tapana	Chiranjeevi's fan	
2004	Athade Oka Sainyam	Magician Ali	
2004	Nenunnanu	Kamal Hassan	
2004	Kushi Kushiga		
2004	Preminchukunnam Pelliki Randi		
2004	Naani	Simham	
2004	Aithe Enti		
2004	Bhadradri Ramudu		
2004	Andaru Dongale Dorikite	Drunkard	
2004	Sakhiya		
2004	Konchem Touchlo Vunte Cheputanu		
2005	Dhairyam	Makarana	
2005	Relax	Ram Nepal Varma	
2005	Hungama	Badri	
2005	Evadi Gola Vaadidhi	Story teller	
2005	Super	John Abraham	
2005	Subash Chandra Bose	Kareem	
2005	Soggadu	Cameo	
2005	Naa Alludu	Murugan's friend	
2005	Kanchanamala Cable TV		
2005	Meenakshi		
2006	Khatarnak	Satti Pandu	
2006	Boss - I Love You	Nagarjunasagar	
2006	Maayajaalam	Ghost	
2006	Tata Birla Madhyalo Laila	Laila / Mastan	
2006	Bhagyalakshmi Bumper Draw	Yesudas	
2006	Kithakithalu	Room boy	
2006	Pokiri	President of Beggars Association	
2006	Annavaram	Malayali Priest	
2006	Pellaina Kothalo	T.V Anchor Ali	
2007	Desamuduru	Gudumba Shankar (Swamiji); Shankar (bank employee)	
2007	Mee Sreyobhilashi	Watchman Ali	
2007	Allare Allari		
2007	Seema Sastri		
2007	Tulasi	Bunty	
2007	Bhajantrilu		
2007	Takkari	Roshan from HITEC City	
2007	Chirutha	Nachimi	
2007	Yamadonga	Satti	
2007	Toss		
2007	Bahumati		
2007	Yogi	Ali Basha	
2008	Chintakayala Ravi	Nachimi	
2008	Pandurangadu		
2008	Salute	Divya's assistant	
2008	Kuberulu		
2008	John Appa Rao 40 Plus		
2008	Black & White		
2008	Dongala Bandi	Tantia Tope; Tribal leader	
2008	Hare Ram		
2008	Konchem Koththaga		
2008	Somberi	Sombabu	
2008	Bujjigadu	Sarparaju Katre; Bokadia; Kuflee	
2008	Kantri	Chang Lee	
2008	Jalsa	Abhi	
2008	Adivishnu		
2008	Deepavali	Ajay Devagan aka Cheta	
2008	Donga Sachinollu		
2008	Bommana Brothers Chandana Sisters		
2008	Nee Sukhame Ne Koruthunna		
2008	Premabhishekam	Kanakamba Rao	
2008	Nenu Meeku Telusa?	Scanny from Scotland	
2008	Ontari	ATM	
2008	Vishaka Express		
2008	Doshi		
2008	Veedu Mamoolodu Kadu	Anand	
2009	Billa	Shankaram	
2009	Kick	Dr. Bali	
2009	Naa Style Veru	Johnny	
2009	Evaraina Epudaina	Shivam	
2009	Oy!	Layout Lingaraju	
2009	Bumper Offer	Bhairava	
2009	Ek Niranjan	Mantra	
2009	Pistha	Chittibabu	
2009	Jaganmohini	Jaganmohan	partially reshot version
2009	Pravarakhyudu		
2010	Puli	Basha	
2010	Cara Majaka	Rambabu	
2010	Khaleja	Tom Cruise	
2010	Don Seenu	Rama Rao aka RAMS	
2010	Golimaar	Gopi	
2010	Jhummandi Naadam	Ranjith Kumar	
2010	Happy Happy Ga	Varun Jet Li	
2010	Kathi Kantha Rao	Blade Babji	
2011	Super	Chaddi brother	partially reshot version
2011	Veera	Pataas	
2011	Madatha Kaja	Akuvakala Lingaraju / Ali	
2011	Nenu Naa Rakshasi		
2011	Theenmaar	Taxi driver	
2011	Brahmi Gadi Katha		
2011	Oh My Friend	"Clarity" Kannayya	
2011	Panjaa	Chotu	
2011	Shakti	Tommy	
2011	Katha Screenplay Darsakatvam Appalaraju	Ringtone Rahman Sharma	
2011	Wanted		
2011	Anaganaga O Dheerudu	Jilebi	
2011	Mirapakay	Al Pacino	
2011	Solo	James Cameron	
2011	Priyudu	Kuphli Baba; Hukka Baba; Pungi Baba	
2012	Cameraman Gangatho Rambabu	SRK	
2012	Devudu Chesina Manushulu	Goli	
2012	Gabbar Singh	Samba a. k. a. "Ram Prasad"	
2012	Bodyguard	Bapatla	
2012	Nuvva Nena	Chanti	
2012	Sudigadu	Doctor	
2012	Rachcha	Papa Rao Love Guru	
2012	Dhammu	Rama Chandra's friend	
2013	Balupu	Dr. Savitri	
2013	Chandee	Cherry	
2013	Ramachari	Ganguly	
2013	Greeku Veerudu	Jori	
2013	Atharintiki Daaredi	Paddu	
2013	Sahasam	Qayamat Raju	
2013	Gunde Jaari Gallanthayyinde	Pandu	
2013	Ongole Gittha	Cheddodu	
2013	Kevvu Keka	Appala Raju	
2013	Masala	Suri	
2013	Abbai Class Ammai Mass		
2013	Iddarammayilatho	Gudivada Krishna	
2013	Biskett		
2014	Mukunda	Veeraraju	
2014	Galata		
2014	Oka Laila Kosam	Pandu	
2014	Dikkulu Choodaku Ramayya	Tom	
2014	Heart Attack	Rajinikanth's fan	
2014	Laddu Babu		
2014	Manam	Leonardo DiCaprio	
2014	Run Raja Run	Dr. Subramaniam, FRCS	
2014	Rabhasa	Karthik's friend	
2014	Race Gurram	Dr. Bali MBBS	
2014	Erra Bus	Auto driver	
2014	Chinnadana Nee Kosam	Rahul	
2015	Moodu Mukkallo Cheppalante		
2015	Temper	Chain Snatcher	
2015	Ram Leela		
2015	Rey	Lungi Baba	
2015	S/O Satyamurthy	Parandhamayya	
2015	Srimanthudu	Rajaratnam	
2015	Lion	Ambali	
2015	Bruce Lee - The Fighter	PK	
2015	Sher	Dr. Kanakarathnam	
2015	Red Alert		
2015	Size Zero	Bobby	
2015	Loafer	Spider Babu	
2016	Rojulu Marayi		
2016	Ism	Don Bosco (Marriage Broker)	
2016	Srirastu Subhamastu	Shyam Sundar	
2016	Thikka	Kapoor	
2016	Sardaar Gabbar Singh	Samba	
2016	Speedunnodu	WiFi Vaikuntam	
2016	Oopiri	Lawyer Lingam	
2017	London Babulu	Kutumba Rao	
2017	Radha	Dr. DNA	
2017	Oxygen	Savitri	
2017	Rogue	Beggar	
2017	PSV Garuda Vega	Lawyer	
2017	Raja the Great	Kabbadi Team player	
2017	Katamarayudu	Linga "Lingam" Babu	
2017	Winner	Horseman Babu; Peter Heins	
2017	Khaidi No. 150	Malli	
2018	Nela Ticket	Ali	
2018	Raa Raa		
2018	Juvva	Dr Alia Bhatt	
2018	Gayatri	Salman Khan	
2018	Howrah Bridge		
2019	Amma Rajyam Lo Kadapa Biddalu	Tammineni Sitaram	
2019	90ML	Dr. Nadiridinna	
2019	Raju Gari Gadhi 3	Ashwin's friend	
2019	Chanakya	Pet Doctor	
2021	FCUK: Father Chitti Umaa Kaarthik		
2021	Krack	Shankar's friend	
2022	Induvadana		
2022	Son of India	TV5 News reporter	
2022	Ante Sundaraniki	Film director	
2022	Sadha Nannu Nadipe	ABCD	
2022	F3	Pala Baby	
2022	Liger	Ali Bhai	Bilingual film; shot in Telugu and Hindi
2022	Ranga Ranga Vaibhavanga	Lecturer	
2022	Dhamaka	JP’s assistant	
2022	S5 No Exit	Sambasiva Rao	
2023	Veera Simha Reddy	Darbar	Cameo
2023	Organic Mama Hybrid Alludu	Reporter	
2023	Katha Venuka Katha		
2023	Ramabanam	Purushottam	
2023	Ala Ila Ela		
2023	Mr. Pregnant		
2023	Slum Dog Husband		
2023	Kushi	Himalayan Baba	Cameo
2023	Sound Party	Albert Pitchcock	
2024	Geethanjali Malli Vachindi	Ventriloquist Venkat Rao	
2024	Honeymoon Express	Dr. Bhangima Bhaskar	
2024	Buddy		
2024	Usha Parinayam	Don Bosco	
2024	Double iSmart	Boka	
2024	Saripodhaa Sanivaaram	Surya’s boss	
2025	Oh Bhama Ayyo Rama	Ram’s uncle	
2025	K-Ramp	Exam paper evaluator	
2025	Vrusshabha	Traveller	Partially reshot in Malayalam
2026	Sampradayini Suppini Suddapoosani	Raghava	

=== As a lead actor ===
List of Ali Telugu films and roles as lead actor
Year	Title	Role	Notes
1994	Ammayi Kapuram		
1994	Yamaleela	Suraj	
1995	Alibaba Adhbutha Deepam		
1995	Mister Mayagadu		
1995	Chinnabbulu		
1995	Ghatotkachudu	Ranga	
1996	Akkum Bakkum		
1996	Pittala Dora		
1996	Hello Neeku Naaku Pellanta		
1996	Nalla Pusalu		
1996	College Student		
1996	Family		
1997	Aashadam Pelli Koduku		
1997	Circus Sattipandu	Sattipandu	
1997	Ayyinda Leda	Dr. Ramu	
1997	Kurralla Rajyam		
1997	Kaliyugamlo Gandaragolam	Chiranjeevi	
1997	High Class Atha Low Class Alludu		
1998	Bhale Police	Ali	
1998	Aavaaragaadu		
1999	Asala Sandadi		
2007	Gundamma Gaari Manavadu	Yedukondalu	
2008	Somberi	Sombabu	
2008	Gajibiji		
2008	Tinnama Padukunnama, Tellarinda	Somberi	
2013	Alibaba Okkade Donga		
2021	Lawyer Viswanath	Viswanath	

=== As dubbing artist ===
List of Ali films and roles as a dubbing artist
Year	Title	Actor	Character	Notes
1997	Aaro Pranam	Vadivelu	Chanti's friend	
2019	The Lion King	Billy Eichner	Timon	Tekugu dubbed version in Telugu
2024	Mufasa: The Lion King	Billy Eichner	Timon	Telugu dubbed version

== Hindi films ==
List of Hindi films and roles
Year	Title	Role	Notes
1984	Gangvaa	Naitji	Child artist
1991	Prem Qaidi	Prisoner	
1993	Muqabla	Thief	
2019	Total Dhamaal	Tamil guy	
2019	Dabangg 3	Constable Raju	
2022	Liger	Ali Bhai	
2026	Daadi Ki Shaadi	Captain Adivishnu Reddy	

== Tamil films ==
List of Ali Tamil films and roles
Year	Title	Role	Notes	Ref.
1991	Shanti Enathu Shanti	Raja's friend		
2004	New	Siruthai		
2013	Settai	House owner		
2015	Puli	Karki Newton		
2015	Inji Iduppazhagi	Bobby		
2021	Maaligai	Vishnuvardhan's uncle	Only dubbed version released	
2026	Sweety Naughty Crazy	Ganeshan		

== Other language films ==
List of Ali other language films and roles
Year	Title	Role	Language	Notes
2010	Super	Chaddi Brother	Kannada	
2014	Namo Bhootatma	Brother Ali	Kannada	
2019	Kempegowda 2	Deshmukh's relative	Kannada	
2024	Hrashwo Deergha		Nepali	

== Television ==
List of Ali television shows and roles
Year	Title	Role	Network
2013	Ali 420	Himself	ETV
2014–2016	Alitho Jollygaa	Himself	ETV
2014	ATM	Himself	ETV
2016–2024	Alitho Saradaga	Host	ETV
2020–2022	Yamaleela Aa Taruvatha	Suraj	ETV
