= Pellamtho Panenti =

- Directed by: S. V. Krishna Reddy
- Written by: S. V. Krishna Reddy](story/screenplay), Diwakar Babu (dialogues)
- Produced by: Kumar
- Starring: Venu; Laya; Kalyani
- Cinematography: C. Ramprasad
- Edited by: Marthand K. Venkatesh
- Music by: S. V. Krishna Reddy
- Production companies: Sri Jagannatha Cine & Media creations
- Release date: 12 September 2003
- Running time: 150 minutes
- Country: India
- Language: Telugu

Pellamtho Panenti (transl. What is the use of wife?) is a 2003 Indian Telugu-language romantic drama film directed by S. V. Krishna Reddy. The film stars Venu, Laya, and Kalyani.

== Plot ==
Madhu runs a beauty parlor. He does not believe in love and marriage and thinks that he can manage his life without a wife. A medical transcriptionist named Sirisha falls in love with him at first sight and tries all possible ways to attract him. But he rejects her proposal saying that love is just a business. Madhu visits other country on a business purpose and happens to meet another girl Kalyani. At first Kalyani hates him because he follows call girls. However she starts developing feelings for him after they return to India. He does the same with her too when she tries to propose her love. Both girls pester him to love them. Once Kalyani directly goes to his house and declares herself as his would be wife. Kalyani also reveals that she is going to die soon because of a bullet present in her head. At first Madhu does not believe her and gets irritated by constant following and throws her out. However, when Madhu tells Sirisha about this, she examines her diagnostic report and finds whatever Kalyani told to be true. The doctors had advised her not to go for the surgery which would result in immediate death. Sirisha also encourages Madhu to accept Kalyani. So he tries to share his love with her. Meanwhile, Sirisha also finds out the German doctor who dealt her case. Madhu and Sirisha travel to Germany and convinces the doctor to perform a surgery. Kalynani is saved after the surgery and tells Madhu that Sirisha is his true love. Finally Madhu and Sirisha are married to each other.

== Cast ==
- Venu as Madhu, owner of a beauty parlor
- Laya as Sirisha, a medical transcription professional
- Kalyani as Kalyani
- Kota Srinivasa Rao as Kalyani's father
- Brahmanandam as Madhu's assistant
- Giri Babu as Madhu's father
- Chandra Mohan as Madhu's assistant
- Kondavalasa Lakshmana Rao as Sirisha's father
- Telangana Shakuntala as Sirish's mother
- Sumitra as Kalyani's mother
- Suhasini Maniratnam as Madhu's mother
- Ali
- Uttej in a cameo
- Gundu Hanumantha Rao
- Ananth Babu
- Prabhakar
- Rajitha
- Bandla Ganesh

== Production ==
After the success of his previous film Pellam Oorelithe, director S. V. Krishna Reddy thought of a film with similar background. Kalyani, who did a native Telugu girl in successful movies like Vasantham, Kabaddi Kabaddi, Avunu Valliddaru Ishtapaddaru was chosen for a critical role for this film.

== Music ==
Music for this film is composed by the director S. V. Krishna Reddy himself like most of his other films. The album has six tracks. The audio was launched at Padmalaya Studios on 11 August 2003.

- "Enni Janmalaina Chalava"
- "Koosindi Koyila"
- "Malle Chettu Ninnu Chusi"
- "O Lammo"
- "Oka Nimisham ayina"
- "Vinando"

== Reception ==
The Hindu wrote "Krishna Reddy, to whom the story and music are credited, does not fare well in both these departments. As far as his music goes, he is repeating himself, as if he has exhausted his resources. Even the theme is drab". Idlebrain wrote "SV Krishna Reddy - who delivered a hit in the form of 'Pellam Voorelithe' - failed this time with the film 'Pellamtho Panenti..'. The screenplay of the film is dull. The comedy timing did not workout in the entire first half. The direction is clichéd". Full Hyderabad wrote "A snoozefest, Pellamtho Panenti is so twisted that you begin to wait for it to get entangled in its contradictions. At a run time of over 2 and ½ hours, it is 2 hours too long. First off, the film fails to justify its "intriguing" title. Only a passing comment is made in this direction. The credits are all SVK's (Story, Screenplay, Music and Direction), hence the blame is also all his own". Sify wrote "Director S.V.Krishna Reddy continues with his series of Pellamto.. movies but with his latest offering he falters badly. As usual he has tried to lay on the vulnerability of marriage as an institution but gets nowhere near the truth. SVK has no story to tell as the major failure is that the sentiments are not worked out well". Telugu Cinema wrote " S.V. Krishna Reddy made the film in his routine old style. The movie’s comedy is not up to the mark like ‘peLLaam ooreLite...’. The serious twists in the second half of the movie are good but the director failed to focus the sentiment in a novel manner. The first half of the movie got some good comedy but the tempo was not maintained throughout the movie".
