= Venu Thottempudi =

Indian actor

Venu Tottempudi
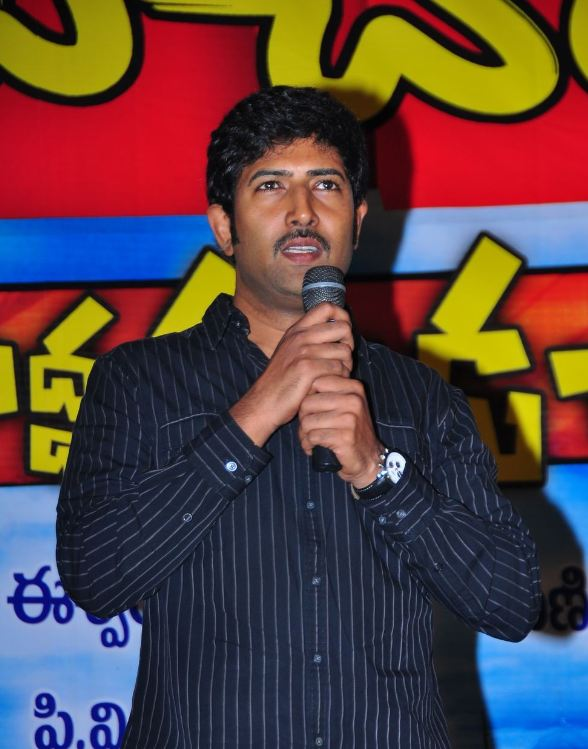
- Venu Tottempudi at the audio release of Ramachari, October 2011.
- Born: 4 June 1976 (age 50); Kakinada, Andhra Pradesh, India
- Other name: Venu
- Occupations: Actor, businessman
- Years active: 1999 – 2013; 2022 - present
- Spouse: Anupama Choudary

Venu Tottempudi (born 4 June 1976) is an Indian actor who primarily works in Telugu cinema. He has appeared in several successful Telugu films as a lead actor from 1999 to the early 2000s.

== Career ==
After finishing his engineering from Dharwad Engineering College, in Karnataka, Venu started pursuing acting as his career. For his first acting job, he was cast as the main lead in a movie directed by Bharathiraja. After a brief period of shooting, the movie was stalled and later cancelled due to production problems. To promote Venu, his friend Venkata Shyamprasad formed S. P. Entertainments. Under this banner, in 1999 Venu started his career with the movie Swayamvaram, directed by K. Vijaya Bhaskar. Co-starring Laya, the movie was very successful at the box-office and Venu won a Nandi Special Jury Award for the movie. Venu became well known for his dialogue delivery, timing, expressions and clear portrayal of emotions. In 2000 after the unsuccessful Manasu Paddanu Kaani, Venu won at the box office once again with Chirunavvutho. G. Ramprasad, who earlier worked with B. Gopal as an assistant director, was roped in as the director for this movie. This movie co-starring Shaheen Khan was produced once again by S. P. Entertainments. Chiru Navvutho became one of the most successful Telugu movie in the year 2000 and received acclaim for Trivikram Srinivas's writing and Venu's performance as a chef whose marriage gets cancelled due to elopement of the bride.

After a couple of successful films, Venu received several offers. Later he appeared in some unsuccessful films like Durga (2000), Veedekkadi Mogudandi? (2001), Priya Nestama (2002), Malli Malli Choodali (2003), Pellamtho Panenti (2003), Cheppave Chirugali (2004) He later bounced back with a couple of hits like Hanuman Junction (2001), Kalyana Ramudu (2003), Pellam Oorelithe (2003), and Kushi Kushiga (2004), His next releases were Sadaa Mee Sevalo (2005) directed by Neelakanta, Sri Krishna 2006 (2006), Illalu Priyuralu (2006), Bahumati directed by S. V. Krishna Reddy and Allare Allari directed by Muppalaneni Siva. He also worked on an unreleased film starring Aarthi Agarwal and Sridevi Vijayakumar during this time.

In 2007, his movie Yamagola Malli Modalayindi co-starring Srikanth, Meera Jasmine and Reemma Sen was released. This movie was successful at the box-office. In 2008, he was seen in Deepavali and a small yet vital role in the movie Chintakayala Ravi starring Venkatesh. In 2009 he was seen in Gopi Gopika Godavari directed by Vamsy and co-starring Kamalinee Mukherjee. In 2011, Venu was seen in Dileep Polan's Mayagadu opposite Charmy Kaur. Venu was also seen in N. T. Rama Rao Jr.'s movie Dammu, directed by Boyapati Srinu. His next release was titled Ramachari and directed by Eshawar. He is paired with Kamalinee Mukherjee in this movie. Venu subsequently took a break from films and campaigned for his brother-in-law in Khammam. After nine years Venu was seen in Ravi Teja's movie Ramarao on Duty, directed by Sarath Mandava.

== Filmography ==
| Year | Title | Role(s) | Notes |
|---|---|---|---|
| 1999 | Swayamvaram | Venu | |
| 2000 | Manasu Paddanu Kaani | Venu | |
| 2000 | Chirunavvutho | Venu | |
| 2000 | Durga | Pratap | |
| 2000 | Pottu Amman | Pratap | Tamil film |
| 2001 | Hanuman Junction | Sathru | |
| 2001 | Veedekkadi Mogudandi? | Sriram | |
| 2002 | Priya Nestama | Surya | |
| 2003 | Malli Malli Choodali | Venu | |
| 2003 | Kalyana Ramudu | Kalyana Ramudu | |
| 2003 | Pellam Oorelithe | Subbu | |
| 2003 | Pellamtho Panenti | Madhu | |
| 2004 | Kushi Kushiga | Sree Kumar | |
| 2004 | Cheppave Chirugali | Venu | |
| 2005 | Sadaa Mee Sevalo | Tilak | |
| 2006 | Illalu Priyuralu | Venu | |
| 2006 | Sri Krishna 2006 | Venkateshwarlu | |
| 2007 | Bahumati | Venkata Ramana | |
| 2007 | Allare Allari | Anand | |
| 2007 | Yamagola Malli Modalayindi | Jr. Chitragupta | |
| 2008 | Chintakayala Ravi | Srikanth | |
| 2008 | Deepavali | Venu | |
| 2009 | Gopi Gopika Godavari | Gopi | |
| 2011 | Mayagadu | Leela Krishna | |
| 2012 | Dammu | Rama Chandra's brother in law | |
| 2013 | Ramachari | Ramachari | |
| 2022 | Ramarao on Duty | CI Jammi Murali | |

=== Television ===
| Year | Title | Role | Network | Ref. |
|---|---|---|---|---|
| 2023 | Athidhi | Ravi | Disney+ Hotstar | |

== Awards and nominations ==
| Year | Award | Category | Film | Result | Ref. |
|---|---|---|---|---|---|
| 2000 | Nandi Awards | Special Jury Award for Best Performance in Debut film | Swayamvaram | Won | |
