= Pottu Amman =

Pottu Amman may refer to:

- Pottu Amman (film), a 2000 Indian film
- Pottu Amman (Tamil militant) (1962–2009), nom de guerre of Sri Lankan Tamil rebel Shanmugalingam Sivashankar
