= Mayagadu =

- Official poster
- Directed by: Dilip Polan
- Written by: Dialogues: Nandyala Ravi; Mohan
- Screenplay by: Dilip Polan
- Story by: Dilip Polan
- Starring: Venu Thottempudi: Charmy Kaur; Satya Krishnan
- Cinematography: Prasad K.
- Edited by: Nandamuri Hari
- Music by: Chakri
- Production company: Sambasiva Creations
- Release date: July 16, 2011
- Country: India
- Language: Telugu

Mayagadu (transl. Magician) is a 2011 Indian Telugu-language romantic drama film directed by Dilip Polan and starring Venu Thottempudi, Charmy Kaur and Satya Krishnan. It is a remake of the Bollywood film Kyo Kii... Main Jhuth Nahin Bolta, which was released in 2001. The film was released after much delay.

== Cast ==
- Venu Thottempudi as Leela Krishna
- Charmy Kaur as Vandana
- Satya Krishnan as Spandana
- Raghu Babu as Raghu, Krishna's friend
- Sayaji Shinde as Chidambaram
- Ravi Babu as Ravi
- Ali as Vishwanath
- AVS
- Satya Prakash

== Production ==
The film reached its post-production stage in mid-2008.

== Soundtrack ==
The soundtrack was composed by Chakri.

Track listing
No.	Title	Lyrics	Singer(s)	Length
1.	"Love Me Love Me"	Kandikonda	Ravi Varma, Geetha Madhuri	4:08
2.	"Morning Morning"	Kandikonda	Kousalya	3:34
3.	"Andamaina Aasa Undi"	Kandikonda	Chakri, Malavika	4:10
4.	"Ye Face Choosina"	Ramajogayya Sastry	Chakri	3:23
5.	"Mounam Prema"	Anantha Sriram	Chakri, Pranavi	4:22
6.	"Vinna Vinna"	Anantha Sriram	Chakri, Pranavi	4:17
Total length:				23:54

== Reception ==
A critic from The Hindu wrote that the film was "As boring as sitting through a tax seminar".
