= Sri Krishna 2006 =

- VCD cover
- Directed by: V. Vijayendra Prasad
- Written by: V. Vijayendra Prasad
- Story by: V.Vijayendra Prasad
- Produced by: D. Ramanaidu
- Starring: Srikanth; Venu; Ramya Krishna; Gowri Munjal
- Cinematography: Ravindra Babu
- Edited by: Marthand K. Venkatesh
- Music by: M. M. Srilekha
- Production company: Suresh Productions
- Distributed by: Suresh Productions
- Release date: 26 May 2006
- Running time: 134 minutes
- Country: India
- Language: Telugu

Sri Krishna 2006 is a 2006 Indian Telugu-language film directed by Vijayendra Prasad and produced by D. Ramanaidu. The film stars Srikanth, Venu, Ramya Krishna and Gowri Munjal.

== Plot ==
Venkateshwarulu (Venu) is a free guy who actually has some good opinion on marriage. Once his grandmother tells about the two marriages concept. From then he is interested in that. And after some time falls for Indu (Gowri Munjal). Her brother in law Ramakrishna Raju (Srikanth) husband of her elder sister Bhanu (Ramya Krishna) misleads Venkateshwarulu and start making him to realise his mistakes and love towards Indu. The rest of the story is revolved around how Venkateshwarulu and Indu overcome their love towards each other.

== Cast ==
- Srikanth as Ramakrishna Raju, Bhanu's husband
- Venu as Venkateswarulu, Indu's husband
- Ramya Krishna as Bhanu, Indu's older sister (voiced by Shilpa)
- Gowri Munjal as Indu (voiced by Sunitha)
- Dharmavarapu Subramanyam as CI Suri Babu
- Bramhanandam as Mandela
- Ali as Thasselu
- Abhinayashree as Satya
- Jeeva as Satya's brother
- Venu Madhav
- Telangana Shakuntala
- Gundu Hanumantha Rao as Constable
- Gautam Raju as Constable
- Jhansi as Mandela's wife
- Annapurna as Venkateswarulu's grandmother
- Kondavalasa Lakshmana Rao as Mandela's Father-in-Law
- Kodi Ramakrishna
- Kausha Rach

== Music ==
Sri Krishna 2006

Soundtrack album by M.M. Srilekha
- Released: 2006
- Length: 22:29
- Producer: M. M. Srilekha

The music of the film was composed by M. M. Srilekha. The audio launch function was held on 4 May 2006 at Ramanaidu Studios. The audio CD was released in the same studio on 20 May.

No	Song title	Lyricist	Singers	Duration
1	"Soniye Soniye"	Bharthi Babu	Devi Sri Prasad	04:16
2	"Paruvala Taara"	Vijaykumar Chirravoori	S. P. Balasubrahmanyam, M. M. Srilekha	04:40
3	"Jagadeka Veeruniga"	Suddala Ashok Teja	S. P. Balasubrahmanyam	02:45
4	"Brundavana Madi "	Veturi	S. P. Balasubrahmanyam, M.M. Srilekha	03:46
5	"Nagumomu"	Shiva Shakti Datta	Chitra	03:25
6	"Puttindi Mandapeta"	Bharthi Babu	Rimi Tomy	04:17

== Box office ==
The film was well received by the audience and was a box office success.
