= Bahumati =

- Directed by: S. V. Krishna Reddy
- Written by: S. V. Krishna Reddy; Diamond Ratnababu (dialogue)
- Produced by: Kodi Nagarjuna
- Starring: Venu Thottempudi; Sangeetha; Shabana Khan
- Cinematography: M. Jawahar Reddy
- Edited by: K. V. Krishna Reddy
- Music by: S. V. Krishna Reddy
- Release date: 30 June 2007
- Running time: 194 minutes
- Country: India
- Language: Telugu

Bahumati is a 2007 Indian Telugu-language romantic comedy-drama film written and directed by S. V. Krishna Reddy under R.R Movie Makers. The film stars Venu Thottempudi, Sangeetha and Shabana Khan. The movie is based on It Could Happen To You (1994) starring Nicolas Cage and Bridget Fonda, which was remade in Hindi as Bade Dilwala.

== Plot ==
Venkataramana is an honest police officer who refuses to accept bribes and always stands by his word. He is an orphan and dreams of helping the other orphans. His friend plays a cop who misses no opportunity to make money fining pedestrians for not wearing a helmet.

Venkataramana's wife Bhanumathi is a middle-class woman who dreams of riches and a wealthy lifestyle. The honest cop cannot fulfill her demands and suffers constant harassment from his wife who also denies him conjugal bliss.

Venkataramana buys a lottery ticket for his wife. When he eats at a restaurant, he is unable to pay the bill. Thus he promises to share half the prize money from his lottery with Dharani (Shabhana Khan), who is a waitress at the hotel.

Venkataramana wins 100 million in the lottery and as promised he gives 50 million to Dharani. Bhanumathi cannot digest this fact and she suspects that her husband is having an affair with the waitress. Her suspicion is further strengthened with the exposé by the intrusive news media. She files for divorce and the full 100 million prize money. She wins the case and Venkataramana is left on the streets.

The fate of the newly divorced couple and Dharani is disclosed in the climax.

== Cast ==
- Venu Thottempudi as Venkataramana
- Sangeetha as Bhanumathi
- Shabana Khan
- Ali
- Kota Srinivasa Rao
- Dharmavarapu Subrahmanyam
- Giri Babu
- Krishna Bhagawan
- Brahmanandam
- AVS
- Shankar Melkote
- Surekha Vani
- Sunil
- Sridhar Rao
- M. S. Narayana
- Satya Krishnan
- Pavala Syamala
- Duvvasi Mohan

== Production ==
There was controversy over the initial title of the film and the title Bahumati was chosen by the audience.

== Soundtrack ==
The music was composed by S. V. Krishna Reddy. The audio launch was held on 19 May 2007.

== Reception ==
Jeevi of Idlebrain.com rated the film three out of five and wrote that "SV Krishna Reddy has been given successive failures in the recent times. This film could come as respite to him as it has got decent humor and family orientation". A critic from Sify wrote that "SVK succeeds to some extent in stuffing sentiments in the second half. Wife?s realization is just a normal subject as seen in umpteen Telugu films. Dialogues are laced with punch".
