= Malli Malli Choodali =

- DVD cover
- Directed by: Pawans Sreedhar
- Written by: Pawans Sreedhar; Poosala
- Produced by: K. Venkateswara Rao; M. C. Sekhar
- Starring: Venu Thottempudi; Janani
- Cinematography: M. Mohanchand
- Edited by: Nandamuri Hari
- Music by: Yuvan Shankar Raja
- Production company: Siva Sivani Movies
- Release date: 28 March 2002
- Country: India
- Language: Telugu

Malli Malli Choodali (transl. Watch again and again) is a 2002 Indian Telugu-language film written and directed by Pawans Sreedhar, starring Venu Thottempudi and Janani, in lead and Vizag Prasad, Ali, P. Ravi Shankar, King Kong and Ramji among others in supporting roles. The film released on 28 March 2002 and proved to be very unsuccessful at the box-office.

== Cast ==
- Venu Thottempudi as Pavan
- Janani as Gayatri
- Vizag Prasad as Jagadish Prasad, Gayatri's father
- Costumes Krishna as Ramachandra Rao, Pavan's father
- Sobha Rani as Gayatri's mother
- Jyothi as Pavan's sister
- Ali as Pavan's friend
- Babu Mohan
- P. Ravi Shankar as Police Inspector
- Ramji as Babu
- King Kong as Pavan's friend
- Rajitha
- Gautham Raju as Auto passenger
- Deepa
- Anitha Chowdary

== Production ==
The film was shot in Araku, Hyderabad, Ramoji Film City and Visakhapatnam. Two songs were recorded in London, reportedly a first for a Telugu film. Scenes involving Venu Thottempudi, Janani and their respective parent characters were shot at the hydraulically operated airplane set in Ramoji Film City.

== Soundtrack ==
The music was composed by noted Tamil film composer Yuvan Shankar Raja. The soundtrack, released on 28 February 2002 at Hotel Green Park in Hyderabad, features 7 tracks overall, out of which 2 songs were earlier used in two Tamil films. The lyrics were written by Bhuvanachandra, Chandrabose and Kulashekhar.

Track	Song	Singer(s)	Duration	Lyricist	Notes
1	'Vennelalo'	Unni Krishnan, Bhavatharini	4:27	Bhuvanachandra	
2	'Whiskylo'	Karthik Raja, Tippu	4:26	Bhuvanachandra	
3	'Suparu'	Shankar Mahadevan, Sunidhi Chauhan	4:49	Chandrabose	
4	'Mabbullo'	Devan, Tippu	4:47	Kulashekhar	
5	'Ivi Mallela'	Yuvan Shankar Raja	4:24	Chandrabose	Reused song "Idhu Kaadhala" from Thulluvadho Ilamai
6	'Teenage Paparo'	Shankar Mahadevan, Mathangi	4:23	Bhuvanachandra	Reused song "All Day Jolly Day" from Manadhai Thirudivittai
7	'Malli Malli Chudali'		1:36		

== Reception ==
A critic from Full Hyderabad gave the film a negative review.
