= Kushi Kushiga =

- DVD Cover
- Directed by: G. Ram Prasad
- Screenplay by: G. Ram Prasad
- Story by: Siddique
- Based on: Chronic Bachelor (Malayalam)(2003) by Siddique
- Produced by: Aditya Ram
- Starring: Jagapati Babu; Venu; Ramya Krishna; Sangeetha; Nikita Thukral
- Cinematography: D. Prasad Babu
- Edited by: K. Ramesh
- Music by: S. A. Rajkumar
- Production company: Adityaram Movies
- Release date: 16 April 2004
- Running time: 148 minutes
- Country: India
- Language: Telugu
- Box office: ₹6 crore distributors' share

Kushi Kushiga (transl. Happy happily) is a 2004 Indian Telugu-language action comedy film directed by G. Ram Prasad. Starring Jagapati Babu, Venu, Ramya Krishna, Sangeetha, and Nikita Thukral and music composed by S. A. Rajkumar. The film is a remake of the 2003 Malayalam film Chronic Bachelor starring Mammootty.

Kushi Kushiga was a box office success.

== Plot ==
The film begins in a village where fierce rivalry rages between the families of Chalasi Rayudu and Neelakantam. It continues between their heirs, Surya Prakash / SP & Bhavani. The feud escalates when SP triumphs over Bhavani in court and gets his property while she vows to destroy him. SP is a chronic bachelor who hates the idea of love & women. He stays opposite a women's hostel. He secretly cares about a girl named Sandhya, as her sponsor but she is unaware of it. Bhama, a smart and extrovert girl, the new admission in the hostel falls for SP at first sight. From there, she chases and annoys SP to get his attention and receive his love but fails. Parallelly, Srikumar is a casanova, the son of SP's maternal uncle, Seetaramaiah, who nurtured him. SP assures his uncle to reform Sri. So, he makes the guy and his sidekick Errababu stay with him. Anguished, Sri tries to leave, but he backs down after seeing Sandhya, whom he truly loves. Now, Sri & Bhama become friends to support each other. After a few comic scenes, Bhama discovers SP as Sandhya's sponsor and questions him. Then, he proclaims Sandhya as his half-sister.

Twenty years ago, his father, Rayudu, was an arbitrator in their village. Before his marriage, he secretly weds a woman, Ramalakshmi, and they have two children, Shekar & Sandhya. Exploiting it, Neelamkantam seeks to make it into a scandal to humiliate Rayudu. To shield Rayudu's honor, Ramalakshmi lies that Rayudu did not father her kids, humiliating Sekhar, who leaves and becomes a wanderer and goon. Surprisingly, SP & Bhavani are having a budding romance during that time. SP's sister Lakshmi and Bhavani's cousin Vishnu are also in love. Neelakantam, upon knowing this orchestrated a trap by murdering Vishnu and incriminates Rayudu, which ends with the latter's suicide. In addition, Neelakantam grabs their property manipulating SP. When SP flares up on him, a confrontation arises between SP & Bhavani leading to SP vowing never to love a woman. SP also tries to revive his stepmother's family, but seeing her hatred towards him, he leaves but still silently looks after Sandhya.

Now being aware of it, Bhama promises to help SP. Firstly, she brings Sandhya nearer to SP by revealing him as her sponsor and arranging her birthday. Shockingly, Bhama is revealed to be Bhavani's sister who reviles SP for snaring her sister. Accordingly, she forcefully takes Bhama back but she escapes with the help of Sri. Later, SP realizes Sri & Sandhya's love affair and the changed form of Sri. Hence, he decides to get them married, which Sri's parents reject as Sandhya is an orphan. Then SP tells them the truth, which Sandhya overhears. Though he fears she will hate him, she tells her mother regretted hurting him back then and that she has always love her brother.

During the engagement, Neelakantam arrives along with SP's enraged elder brother, Shekar, who resembles their father. Shekar takes Sandhya back by force as he is her own brother and fixes her alliance with Bhavani's brother Ravindra, as he is oblivious to Neetakantam's ploy and hates SP due to his hatred towards their father. SP vows to unite Sri & Sandhya and finish off everyone who stands in the way. On the wedding day, a brawl erupts between the siblings, which is paused by Sandhya claiming that she cares about both. Immediately, SP discloses the diabolic shade of Neelakantam and proves his father as righteous, which makes Sheker realize he was being manipulated. SP also makes Neelakantam confess to killing Vishnu, making Bhavani realize she fought with SP over all the years due to her father. Bhavani attempts suicide due to her guilt but SP rescues her, and they reunite. Finally, the movie ends on a happy note with SP & Bhavani reuniting.

== Cast ==
- Jagapati Babu as Surya Prakash "SP"
- Venu as Sri Kumar, SP's cousin
- Ramya Krishna as Bhavani, SP's ex love-interest and rival
- Sangeetha as Satya Bhama, Bhavani's sister
- Nikita Thukral as Sandhya, Rayudu and Mahalakshmi's daughter, SP's step-sister, Sri's love-interest
- Bhanu Chander (double role) as
  - Rayudu, Village head, SP, Lakshmi, Sandhya and Shekhar's father;
  - Shekhar, Rayudu and Mahalakshmi's son, Sandhya's brother, SP and Lakshmi's step- brother
- Devan as Neelakantham, Bhavani and Bhama's father
- Sunil as Errababu, Sri's friend
- Ali as Beggar
- Dharmavarapu Subramanyam as SP's assistant
- Giri Babu as Seetharamaiah, Sri's father, SP's maternal uncle
- M S Narayana as Thief Thirumalai
- Delhi Rajeswari as Seetharamaiah's wife, Sri's mother, SP's maternal aunt
- Pragathi as Mahalakshmi, Rayudu's mistress, SP's step-mother, Shekhar and Sandhya's mother
- Sirisha as Lakshmi, Rayudu's daughter, SP's sister, Sandhya and Shekhar's step-sister

== Soundtrack ==
Kushi Kushiga

Film score by S. A. Rajkumar
- Released: 2 April 2004
- Genre: Soundtrack
- Length: 25:03
- Label: Supreme Music
- Producer: S. A. Rajkumar

S. A. Rajkumar chronology
Tiger Harischandra Prasad (2003)	Kushi Kushiga (2004)	Cheppave Chirugali (2004)

Music composed by S. A. Rajkumar. Music released on Supreme Music Company.Some of the songs have been rearranged from the original Malayalam version composed by Deepak Dev. The music of "Shilayil Ninnum" has been reused for "Teeyani Ee Nijam," and "Chundathu Chethippoo" has been used for "Chamanti Poobanti."

No.	Title	Lyrics	Singer(s)	Length
1.	"Godari Gattundi"	E.S. Murthy	Rajesh, Shreya Ghoshal	2:48
2.	"Teeyani Ee Nijam"	Umamaheswara Rao	Hariharan, Mathangi	5:13
3.	"Chamanti Poobanti"	Bhuvana Chandra	Karthik, Tippu, Sujatha	4:48
4.	"Aakasha Deshana"	Chaitanya Prasad	Udit Narayan, Shreya Ghoshal	5:20
5.	"Preminchey"	E.S. Murthy	Vijay Yesudas	2:11
6.	"Sirisiri Muvvala"	Sahiti	Sujatha, Unni Krishnan, Tippu, Rakesh, Sri Vidya	4:43
Total length:				25:03

== Reception ==
A critic from Sify wrote that "Kushi Kushiga is a sparkling comedy based on family sentiments. G.Ram Prasad seems to know the pulse of the audience and has packaged the film with the right mix of laughter, sentiments, songs and dances".
