= Filmfare Award for Best Comedian – Telugu =

Former Indian annual film award

The Filmfare Award for Best Comedian – Telugu was given by the Filmfare magazine as part of its annual Filmfare Awards South for Telugu films between 2002 and 2005.

The award was introduced and first given at the 50th South Filmfare Awards in 2003, with Brahmanandam being the first recipient. This category was discontinued after the 2005 edition of the awards. Here is a list of the award recipients and the films for which they won.

Year	Actor	Role	Film
2005	Ali	Artist	Super
2004	Sunil	Bapineedu	Pedababu
2003	Ali	Appalaraju	Amma Nanna O Tamila Ammayi
2002	Brahmanandam	Lavangam	Manmadhudu

== See also ==
- Filmfare Awards (Telugu)
- Cinema of Andhra Pradesh
