= Sada Mee Sevalo =

Sadaa Mee Sevalo
- Film poster
- Directed by: Neelakanta
- Written by: Neelakanta
- Produced by: Venkata Shyam Prasad
- Starring: Venu Thottempudi; Shriya Saran
- Cinematography: K. Prasad
- Edited by: Marthand K. Venkatesh
- Music by: Vandemataram Srinivas
- Release date: 25 March 2005
- Country: India
- Language: Telugu

Sadaa Mee Sevalo (transl. Always at your service) is a 2005 Indian Telugu-language family drama film directed by Neelakanta starring Venu Thottempudi and Shriya Saran.

== Plot ==
Tilak is a mind games expert and tries to help people in need. He and his friend, who is a lawyer, and a former police officer help needy people who are in the public. Tilak falls in love with Suryakantham. He follows her and they both fall in love. Suryakantham has difficulty adjusting to help people in need. Suryakantham gets kidnapped by Tilak's enemies. Tilak saves her.

== Cast ==
- Venu Thottempudi as Tilak
- Shriya Saran as Suryakantham
- Sunil as Bunty
- Mallikarjuna Rao
- Tanikella Bharani as Kanaka Rao, Suryakantham's father
- Apoorva as Suryakantham's mother
- Ananth Babu as Tenant with two wives
- Subbaraju as MLA Ravinder Babu
- Telangana Shakuntala as Boggula Mallesh's mother, goon under MLA
- Nutan Prasad
- Rajitha
- Vijayachander

== Production ==
The muhurat took place at Film Nagar, Hyderabad.

== Soundtrack ==
The music was composed by Vandemataram Srinivas and released by Aditya Music.

Sada Mee Sevalo

Soundtrack album by Vandemataram Srinivas
- Released: 2005
- Recorded: 2005
- Genre: Soundtrack
- Length: 27:41
- Label: Aditya Music
- Producer: Vandemataram Srinivas

Track list
No.	Title	Lyrics	Singer(s)	Length
1.	"Ee Dooram"	Kandikonda	Sonu Nigam, Shreya Ghoshal	4:22
2.	"Yem Navvulivile"	Sirivennela Seetharama Sastry	KK, Shreya Ghoshal	4:56
3.	"Hello Hello"	Kandikonda	Abhijeet Bhattacharya	5:09
4.	"O Meghamala"	Kandikonda	Udit Narayan, Usha	4:14
5.	"Lub Dub"	Chaitanya Prasad	Shankar Mahadevan	4:35
6.	"Cheli Cherumari"	Kandikonda	Karthik, Kousalya	4:25
Total length:				27:41

== Release and reception ==
The film was scheduled to release on the 1st week of February 2005 before the release was delayed 20 25 March.

A critic from The Hindu wrote that "Venu and Shreya make a good team. Vandemataram's music is in sync with scenes and the background score, equally enjoyable". A critic from Rediff.com wrote that "Barring a few good comic moments, promising director Neelakantha gets it all wrong this time". A critic from Idlebrain wrote that "Plus points of the film are noble storyline and Shriya. The main drawbacks of the film are inconsistent graph of emotions, slow narration and music. As this film has the background of middle-class family values, it would have more reach to the family crowds".
