= Evandi Aavida Vachindi =

- Theatrical poster
- Directed by: E. V. V. Satyanarayana
- Written by: E. V. V. Satyanarayana
- Produced by: Burugupalli Siva Ramakrishna
- Starring: Sobhan Babu; Vanisri; Sharada; Harish; Rambha
- Edited by: 142
- Music by: Raj–Koti
- Release date: 5 March 1993
- Country: India
- Language: Telugu

Evandi Aavida Vachindi is a 1993 Indian Telugu-language drama film written and directed by E. V. V. Satyanarayana, starring Sobhan Babu, Vanisri, Sharada, Harish, and Rambha.

The film narrates the story of a struggling man who is married to two women. Sobhan Babu played the key role as the struggling husband while Sharada and Vanisri played the roles of his wives.

== Cast ==
- Sobhan Babu as Ramakrishnayya
- Vanisri as Sathyavati
- Sharada as Janaki
- Harish as Achchi Babu
- Rambha as Jhansi
- Kaikala Satyanarayana
- GirI Babu
- Kota Srinivasa Rao
- Brahmanandam as Avadhani
- Babu Mohan
- Sivaji Raja
- Chidatala Appa Rao
- Ali
- Ironleg Sastri
- Master Arjun
- Khayyum

== Soundtrack ==
The soundtrack was composed by Raj–Koti and all lyrics were written by Bhuvana Chandra.

Track list
| No. | Title | Singer(s) | Length |
|---|---|---|---|
| 1. | "Guchhi Guchhi Choodakura" | S. P. Balasubrahmanyam, K. S. Chithra | 5:05 |
| 2. | "Bhama Bhama Paduchu Reyi" | S. P. Balasubrahmanyam, K. S. Chithra | 5:19 |
| 3. | "Oh Priya Priya" | Hanumantha Rao, Madhavapeddi Ramesh, Mano, Muralidhar, Radhika | 5:26 |
| 4. | "Ganganu Chooste" | S. P. Balasubrahmanyam | 4:18 |
| 5. | "Hattukomannadi Bhama" | K. S. Chithra, Mano, S. P. Sailaja | 5:03 |
| Total length: | | | 25:13 |
