= Gopi Gopika Godavari =

2009 Indian movie

- Poster
- Directed by: Vamsy
- Written by: Vamsy
- Produced by: Valluripalli Ramesh Babu
- Starring: Venu Thottempudi; Kamalinee Mukherjee
- Cinematography: Loki P. Goud
- Edited by: Basva Paidireddy
- Music by: Chakri
- Production company: Maharshi Cinema
- Release date: 10 July 2009
- Running time: 162 minutes
- Country: India
- Language: Telugu

Gopi Gopika Godavari is a 2009 Indian Telugu-language directed and written by Vamsy and starring Venu Thottempudi and Kamalinee Mukherjee. The film was released on 10 July 2009. The film is loosely based on the Hollywood film Modern Times (1936).

== Plot ==
Gopi and Gopika, who have never met, fall in love over texting. However, shortly after planning to meet Gopika, Gopi loses his memory in an accident, and she later saves his life as a stranger.

== Cast ==
- Venu Thottempudi as Gopi
- Kamalinee Mukherjee as Gopika
- Krishna Bhagavan
- Jayalalitha
- Pradeep Shakthi
- Kondavalasa Lakshmana Rao
- Praveen
- Narsing Yadav
- Sana
- Krishneswara Rao
- Kalyan Prasad Thoram
- Devi Charan

== Soundtrack ==
Music by Chakri. The platinum disc function took place on 7 July 2009. The song "Nuvvekkadunte" was reused as "Enakkoru Devathai" for Tamil film Pillaiyar Theru Kadaisi Veedu.

Gopi Gopika Godavari

Soundtrack album by Chakri
- Recorded: 2009
- Genre: Feature film soundtrack
- Length: 22.22
- Language: Telugu
- Label: Aditya Music
- Producer: Chakri

Track list
No.	Title	Lyrics	Singer(s)	Length
1.	"Go Go Rye Rye"	Ramajogayya Sastry	Chakri, Vamshi	4:38
2.	"Sundari"	Ramajogayya Sastry	Venu, Madhumitha	4:35
3.	"Nuvvakkadunte"	Ramajogayya Sastry	Chakri, Kousalya	5:18
4.	"Bala Godavari"	Ramajogayya Sastry	Karthik, Kousalya, Vamshi	4:16
5.	"Maavidaaku"	Ramajogayya Sastry	Vasu, Geetha Madhuri	4:15
Total length:				22.22

== Reception ==
A critic from The Hindu wrote, "The lead actors work is subdued and dull. Comedy borders on double entendre and finally the film is just average". Jeevi of Idlebrain.com rated the film 2/5 and wrote, "Gopi Gopika Godavari doesn’t offer anything good except for melodious songs".
