= Sri Bannari Amman =

2002 Indian Tamil-language film

- VCD cover
- Directed by: Bharathi Kannan
- Written by: V. Prabhakar (dialogues)
- Screenplay by: Bharathi Kannan
- Produced by: S. Mahalakshmi
- Starring: Vijayashanti; Karan; Laya
- Cinematography: Vijai
- Edited by: V. Jaishankar
- Music by: T. Rajendar
- Production company: Sri Mahalakshmi Productions
- Release date: 19 April 2002
- Country: India
- Language: Tamil

Sri Bannari Amman is a 2002 Indian Tamil-language devotional film written and directed by Bharathi Kannan. The film featured Vijayashanti in the title role being her 175th project alongside Karan and Laya, while Vadivelu plays a supporting role. The film, which had music composed by T. Rajendar, released in April 2002.

== Cast ==
- Vijayashanti as Sri Bannari Amman
- Karan as Vaanamaalai
- Sirkazhi G. Sivachidambaram as Sage Agastya
- Laya as Bhavani
- Vadivelu as Kozhakatta Govindan
- Rajan P. Dev as Vellangiri
- Singamuthu
- King Kong as Govindan's partner
- Kullamani as Govindan's partner
- Bonda Mani as Govindan's partner
- Baby Akshya
- Khushbu as a dancer ("Kutram Enna" song)
- Sukanya as a dancer ("Athishivan" song)
- Nalini in a special appearance (Atharvana Bhatirakali devotee)

Telugu version

- Ali as thief
- Sudhakar as thug

== Production ==
While marketing the film, the producers featured Sukanya, as well as Khushboo, who appear only in songs, as a selling point in the posters. The film's shoot was held at various temples including Mahasakthi Amman temple at Hyderabad, Sivan temple at Bangalore, Kasi Viswanathar temple at Tenkasi, Mutharamman temple at Kulasekarapattinam, Vekkaliamman temple at Sindalakkarai, Bannari Amman temple at Thiruvakkarai, Kurungaliswarar temple at Koyambedu, Vadivudai Amman at Thiruvotriyur, and Sri Kalikaambal temple in George Town. A scene was shot at a bungalow of king of Courtrallam.

== Soundtrack ==
The music was composed by T. Rajendar who also wrote the lyrics.

Song	Singers	Length
"Vetri Nadai"	T. Rajendar	02:57
"Aathisivan Pathiyada"	T. Rajendar, Sujatha Mohan	06:47
"Thalattu Kettathillai"	K. S. Chithra, Anuradha Sriram	08:14
"Roopamaari"	T. Rajendar	03:10
"Kalakkuthu Karagaatam"	Simbu, Harini	07:20
"Kallaanalum Kanavanthan"	Nithyasree Mahadevan, Swarnalatha	06:34
"Vandhidu Vandhidu"	K. S. Chithra	06:56

== Release and reception ==
The film was released on 12 April 2002. S. R. Ashok Kumar from The Hindu wrote, "if only one story had been woven into a nice screenplay, it would have sustained the tempo. A couple of small stories narrated in the film make the main story line weak.". Ayyappa Prasad of Screen wrote, "Actually it seems that the director is more confused on whether to cash in on Vijayshanthi’s image or go in for more of the unusual stuff". Malini Mannath of Chennai Online wrote, "It is a film that wouldn't disappoint Vijayshanti's fans and would be lapped up by lovers of devotional themes". Sify wrote "The director of the film Bharathi Kannan has specialised in making such films, which is meant for illiterates. However the highlight of the film are two `Amman` songs which are sung by Kushboo and Sukanya in the film".

The film was later dubbed and released in Telugu as Maha Chandi.
