= Hanuman Junction (film) =

2001 film by M. Raja

- DVD cover
- Directed by: M. Raja
- Written by: Thotapalli Madhu (dialogues)
- Screenplay by: M. Raja; Marudhuri Raja
- Story by: Rafi Mecartin
- Based on: Thenkasipattanam (Malayalam)(2000) by Rafi Mecartin
- Produced by: M. V. Lakshmi; Editor Mohan (presents)
- Starring: Arjun; Jagapathi Babu; Venu Thottempudi; Laya; Sneha; Vijayalakshmi
- Cinematography: C. Ramprasad
- Edited by: M. Babji; Editor Mohan (supervision)
- Music by: Suresh Peters
- Production company: M. L. Movie Arts
- Release date: 21 December 2001
- Running time: 159 minutes
- Country: India
- Language: Telugu

Hanuman Junction is a 2001 Indian Telugu-language action comedy film directed by M. Raja in his directorial debut. It stars an ensemble cast of Arjun, Jagapathi Babu, Venu Thottempudi, Laya, Sneha, and Vijayalakshmi. Produced by M. V. Lakshmi under the M. L. Movie Arts banner of Editor Mohan, the film is a remake of the Malayalam film Thenkasipattanam (2000).

The music is composed by Suresh Peters with cinematography by C. Ramprasad. The film released on 21 December 2001 and was a successful venture. The film was dubbed and released in Tamil as Singakottai.

== Cast ==
- Arjun as Krishna
- Jagapati Babu as Dasu
- Venu Thottempudi as Ajaatasathru aka Sathru
- Sneha as Meenakshi
- Laya as Sangeetha
- Vijayalakshmi as Devi
- Jaya Prakash Reddy as Devudayya
- Brahmanandam as Sangeetha's uncle
- Kovai Sarala as Sangeetha's aunt
- Ali as Janaganamana
- Venniradai Niramala as Devudayya's wife
- L. B. Sriram as Chakram
- Paruchuri Venteswara Rao as Venkatachalam
- Chandra Mohan as Chandram
- M. S. Narayana as Abbulu
- Venu Madhav as Devudayya's aide
- Rallapalli
- Besant Ravi as henchman
- Baby Sri Divya as Young Devi
- Sudeepa Pinky as Young Meenakshi

== Production ==
Principal photography began on 11 June 2001.

== Soundtrack ==
Hanuman Junction

Film score by Suresh Peters
- Released: 2001
- Genre: Soundtrack
- Length: 23:56
- Label: Aditya Music
- Producer: Suresh Peters

Music composed by Suresh Peters who composed the for original Malayalam version, thus retaining all the tunes from the original. Music released on Aditya Music Company.

No.	Title	Lyrics	Singer(s)	Length
1.	"Konaseemallo O Koila"	Veturi	Srinivas, K. S. Chithra	5:08
2.	"Oka Chinni Ledikuna"	Chandrabose	Sujatha Mohan and Chorus	4:22
3.	"Golmaal Golmaal"	Veturi	K. S. Chithra, Mano, M. G. Sreekumar, Sujatha Mohan	4:52
4.	"O Prema Prema"	Chandra Bose	Suresh Peters	5:18
5.	"Kushi Kushiga"	Veturi	Shankar Mahadevan, Swarnalatha	4:16
Total length:				23:56

== Reception ==
Sify rated the film 3/5 and called the film a "clean comedy." On performances, the reviewer wrote, "Venu as Sathru proves that he is excellent in comedy. Arjun as Krishna is perfect, but Jagapathi as Dasu could have been better." Idlebrain.com rated the film 3.25 and stated: "The story and relationships in this film are quite complex. But the whole credit should go to the debutant director Raja to narrate a story in such a way that all the viewers understand the complex and randomly changing relationships clearly." Andhra Today wrote "Entertainment is the core of this movie and the director has done full justice to it, even the story and the script add their impressive contribution to appeal to the audience".
