= Deepavali (2008 film) =

- DVD cover
- Directed by: Hari Babu
- Written by: Diamond Ratnababu (dialogues)
- Screenplay by: Hari Babu
- Story by: Hari Babu
- Produced by: Teegala Kripakar Reddy
- Starring: Venu Thottempudi; Megha Nair; Aarthi Agarwal
- Cinematography: Prasad K.
- Edited by: Ramgopal Reddy
- Music by: Vandemataram Srinivas
- Production company: AAA Arts
- Release date: 28 November 2008
- Country: India
- Language: Telugu

Deepavali is a 2008 Indian romantic drama film directed by Hari Babu and starring Venu Thottempudi, Megha Nair and Aarthi Agarwal.

== Cast ==
- Venu Thottempudi as Venu
- Megha Nair as Sirisha
- Aarthi Agarwal as Aarti
- Brahmanandam as Bunny
- Bhanu Chander as Commissioner
- Vinod Kumar as Sirisha's kidnapper
- Subbaraju as Inspector Ramesh
- Ali as Ajay Devagan aka Cheta
- Chalapathi Rao as Sirisha's father
- Brahmaji as Encounter Specialist
- Satya Prakash as Rahman
- Gundu Hanumantha Rao as Gundu family head
- Kondavalasa Lakshmana Rao as Pillai
- Ananth as Cellphone salesman
- Hema as Sirisha's sister
- Sudha as Sirisha's mother
- Gundu Sudarshan as Sudarshan
- Shankar Melkote as Melkote
- Junior Relangi as Doctor
- Babloo as Bike owner

== Production ==
Ernakulam-based model Megha Nair made her debut with this film. Ogeti Ramana was supposed to be the music director before he was replaced with Vandemataram Srinivas.

== Music ==
Deepavali

Soundtrack album by Vandemataram Srinivas
- Released: 2008
- Genre: Feature film soundtrack
- Length: 24:56
- Language: Telugu
- Label: Aditya Music

Vandemataram Srinivas chronology
Citizen (2008)	Deepavali (2008)	Anjani Putrudu (2009)

The music was composed by Vandemataram Srinivas. The audio release function was held on 28 June 2008 with Tammareddy Bharadwaja releasing the audio CD. Notably, none of the film's lead cast was present at the film's audio launch due to its delay.

Track listing
No.	Title	Singer(s)	Length
1.	"Japanu Cheera"	Ranjith Govind, Geetha Madhuri	5:01
2.	"Masaka Masaka - Remix"	Suchitra	5:19
3.	"Ye Nimisham"	Venu, Geetha Madhuri	4:06
4.	"Tuhi Mera Dil"	Karthik, Pranavi	5:28
5.	"Chiruraku Kommallo"	Karunya, Pranavi	5:02
Total length:			24:56

== Release and reception ==
The film was eventually released on 26 November alongside R. Narayana Murthy's Devarakonda Veerayya and Nagendra Babu's Ek Police.

In a retrospective review, a writer from V6 Velugu praised the performance of the cast, the music, and the film's comedy and action.
