= Dammu =

2012 film by Boyapati Srinu

Dhammu
- Theatrical Poster
- Directed by: Boyapati Srinu
- Written by: Story & Screenplay: Boyapati Srinu; Dialogues: M. Rathnam
- Produced by: K. S. Rama Rao; K. A. Vallabha
- Starring: N.T. Rama Rao Jr. Trisha; Karthika Nair
- Cinematography: Arthur A. Wilson
- Edited by: Kotagiri Venkateswara Rao
- Music by: M. M. Keeravani
- Production company: Creative Commercials
- Distributed by: Sri Venkateswara Film Distributors (Nizam); Ficus Inc. (Overseas)
- Release date: 27 April 2012
- Running time: 155 minutes
- Country: India
- Language: Telugu
- Box office: ₹35 crores distributors' share

Dhammu (Note: Alternatively spelt Dammu.) (transl. Guts) is a 2012 Indian Telugu-language action drama film co-written and directed by Boyapati Srinu. The film stars N. T. Rama Rao Jr., Trisha, Karthika Nair, Nassar, Sampath Raj, Rahul Dev, Kishore, Suman, Brahmanandam, Ali, Bhanupriya, Kota Srinivasa Rao and Venu Thottempudi. The film follows an orphan adopted by a Zamindar family with no male heir, only to inherit their brutal, generations old blood feud.

Dhammu received an A (adults only) classification from the CBFC. It was released theatrically on 27 April 2012 and received mixed to negative reviews from critics who praised cast performance and action sequences, but criticised its screenwriting, excessive violence, and double-meaning dialogues. Despite the reception, the film earned a gross of ₹15.2 crore and a ₹8.4 crores distributor share on its first day, setting the record for the biggest opening day in Telugu cinema history at the time of its release. The film grossed ₹60 crore with a distributor share of ₹35 crore and was a commercial success at the box office.

The film was unofficially remade in Bangladeshi as Rajababu - The Power starring Shakib Khan, Apu Biswas and Bobby. The film was dubbed into Tamil titled Singamagan.

== Plot ==
Rama Chandra is an orphan who leads a simple life along with his friend. He falls in love with Sathya, who is a rich girl. Sathya imposes a condition that Rama Chandra's family history should be important. At this very moment, Rama Chandra learns that a rich and powerful royal Suryavamsi family seeks to adopt an heir, where he seizes the chance.

Rama Chandra goes there and realizes that Suryavamsi family has a violent past and a bitter dispute with another rich and powerful royal Chandravamsi family headed by a Chandravamsi King and also realizes that thousands of people in the area are now dependent on him for their very survival. Rama Chandra also discovers that he is actually the real heir to the family and his real name is Raja Vasireddy Vijayadwaja Srisimha. It is revealed he was the biological son of the Suryavamsi family who was taken away from birth as secret to protect him from Chandravamsi forces and was renamed as Rama Chandra. Despite his hatred towards violence, Vijaya tries his best to solve the problems peacefully, but the rival gang does not give him a chance. Vexed with the violence, Vijaya returns and beats up Chandravamsi's king eldest son men before injuring the latter. His middle son later kills him. Now Vijaya is the heir of Suryavamsi family. However, when Chandravamsi's king youngest son killed Vijaya's brother-in-law when Vijaya thwarted him, a grief stricken and enraged Vijaya kills Chandravamsi's king youngest son and his men in retaliation. As Vijaya returned home, a police officer beats him up until he was stopped by Raja of Veera Durgam fort. He revealed about Vijaya true identity. Now Vijaya arrived at Chandravamsi's king house and attack Chandravamsi's king middle son and his men before he opens the Chandravamsi King's eyes by placing a sword on his middle son. Chandravamsi King realizes that his mistakes and apologizes to Vijaya and the family, thus ending the violent nature of the village.

== Cast ==
- N. T. Rama Rao Jr. as Rama Chandra / Raja Vasireddy Vijayadwaja Srisimha
- Trisha as Sathya
- Karthika Nair as Neelaveni
- Nassar as Chandravamsi King
- Brahmanandam as Jaanaki
- Bhanupriya as Rama Chandra's mother
- Venu Thottempudi as Rama Chandra's brother-in-law
- Abhinaya as Rama Chandra's first elder sister
- Hari Teja as Rama Chandra's second elder sister
- Chitralekha as Rama Chandra's third elder sister
- Suman as Suryavamsi King/Raja Surya Pratap Singh
- Kota Srinivasa Rao as Raja of Veera Durgam Fort
- Ahuti Prasad as Neelaveni's father
- Ali as Rama Chandra's friend
- Rahul Dev as Police Officer
- Sampath Raj as Chandravamsi King's elder son
- Kishore as Chandravamsi King's second son
- Sridhar Rao as Chandravamsi King's third son
- Tanikella Bharani as Head Priest
- Chalapathi Rao as Krishnam Raju
- Subhalekha Sudhakar as Sathya's father
- Prabhakar as Chandravamsi King's henchmen
- Snigdha as Sathya's friend
- Kolla Ashok Kumar as Rama Chandra's servant
- Chatrapathi Sekhar
- Prasad Babu
- Shanoor Sana as Kaikeyi
- Sandhya Janak
- Rahul Mahajan (uncredited appearance)
- Maryam Zakaria as item number

== Production ==
Dhammu has music scored by M. M. Keeravani. Shruti Hassan, who was originally signed to play the female lead, walked out citing date issues. Later the producers approached Kajal Aggarwal who also couldn't accommodate bulk dates for the film. The producers finalised Trisha as the first female lead. According to reports, Bhanupriya, Kota Srinivasa Rao, Venu Thottempudi and Subhalekha Sudhakar play supporting roles.

== Soundtrack ==
Dammu

Soundtrack album by M. M. Keeravani
- Released: 29 March 2012
- Recorded: 2012
- Genre: Feature film soundtrack
- Length: 29:32
- Language: Telugu
- Labels: Vel records Sony Music Entertainment
- Producer: M. M. Keeravani

M. M. Keeravani chronology
Rajanna (2011)	Dammu (2012)	Eega (2012)

The soundtrack of the film was released on 29 March 2012 at Shilpakala Vedika in Hyderabad. M. M. Keeravani's music label, Vel Records, and Sony Music Entertainment secured the film's audio rights. The lyrics for all the songs were written by Chandrabose.

Tracklist
No.	Title	Artist(s)	Length
1.	"Sound of Vel" (Instrumental)		00:46
2.	"O Lily"	Baba Sehgal	04:30
3.	"Ruler (Movie Version)"	Prudhvi Chandra, Revanth, Sahiti, Geetha Madhuri	04:55
4.	"Raja Vasi Reddy"	M. M. Keeravani, Krishna Chaithanya	04:44
5.	"Vaastu Bagunde Baby"	Rahul Sipligunj, Sravana Bhargavi, Shivani	04:32
6.	"Dhammu"	Rahul Sipligunj, Sravana Bhargavi, Shivani	04:21
7.	"Ruler (CD Version)"	M. M. Keeravani, Geetha Madhuri	05:44
Total length:			29:32

== Release ==
The Telugu and Tamil versions released on 27 April 2012. Dammu released on approximately 2550 screens worldwide which was a record in Tollywood.It released in approx of 140+ theatres in Karnataka which is considered to be a record by out of state movie.

=== Critical reception ===
B.V.S. Prakash of Deccan Chronicle wrote "Dhammu (Valour), as one of the Telugu films that made high on action and low on contents". Sify wrote "Boyapati uses the same formula of Tollywood action movies with good dialogues, high voltage fight sequences and wraps ups with interesting twist and NTR's charged up performance".

Radhika Rajamani of Rediff gave 2.5 out of 5 stars and wrote "Director Boyapati Seenu's new film Dammu has an outdated and clichéd storyline, regressive content, and mindless and excessive violence".

=== Home media ===
The satellite and digital rights were sold to Zee Telugu and ZEE5 for ₹6.6 crore (US$710,000), the highest buy-over for any film in 2012.

== Awards ==
Ceremony	Category	Nominee	Result
2nd South Indian International Movie Awards	Best Actress in a Supporting Role	Bhanupriya	Nominated
