= Ramma Chilakamma =

2001 Telugu film

- Official poster
- Directed by: Tammareddy Bharadwaja
- Screenplay by: Tammareddy Bharadwaja
- Produced by: KC Sekhar Babu
- Starring: Sumanth; Laya
- Cinematography: V. N. Suresh
- Edited by: Murali-Ramayya
- Music by: R. P. Patnaik
- Release date: 13 July 2001
- Country: India
- Language: Telugu

Ramma Chilakamma (transl. Come, parrot) is a 2001 Indian Telugu-language romantic drama film directed by Tammareddy Bharadwaja and starring Sumanth and Laya. The title of the film is based on a song from Choodalani Vundi (1998). The film is a remake of the Tamil film Ennamma Kannu (2000). After being delayed, the film released on 13 July 2001 and was a box-office failure.

== Cast ==
- Sumanth as Kaasi
- Laya as Gayatri
- Akash as Vishwa
- Brahmanandam as Brahmanandam and SP Vikram Rathore IPS (dual role)
- Tanikella Bharani
- Kovai Sarala as Simran and Simhu Darling (dual role)
- Ahuti Prasad
- Delhi Rejeshwari as Raji
- Jr. Relangi as Police Officer
- Ananth as Police Inspector

== Production ==
A different film under the same name was planned with Venkat. Tammareddy Bharadwaja reused the title for this film. The title is based on a song from Choodalani Vundi (1998). The film is a remake of the Tamil film Ennamma Kannu (2000). Akash, in his Telugu debut, played a small role in the film.

== Soundtrack ==
All music is composed by R. P. Patnaik

No.	Title	Lyrics	Singer(s)	Length
1.	"Maxylu Bikinlu"	Kulasekhar	Ravi Varma
2.	"Sammalori Killa"	Kulasekhar	R. P. Patnaik
3.	"Manasa Manasu Talupa"	Guru Charan	Usha
4.	"Kommala Guvvalu"	Kulasekhar	Sandeep, Sunitha Upadrashta
5.	"Kommala Guvvalu (Sad)"	Guru Charan	Lenina Chowdary
6.	"Chei Chei Chei"	Guru Charan	Chakri

== Release and reception ==
After being delayed, the film released on 13 July 2001.

Ajay Bashyam of Full Hyderabad wrote that "Raamma Chilakamma gets better after the first 45 minutes when the main story kicks in, and keeps you actually interested in knowing what's going to happen next". A critic from indiainfo wrote that "TammaReddy Bhardwaja who made good films earlier, churned out this time a rather dud film with ludicrous story and bad screenplay".

The film was a box office failure.
