= Manasu Paddanu Kaani =

- Directed by: K. Veeru
- Written by: K. Veeru
- Produced by: B. Vinobha Goud
- Starring: Venu; Raasi; Ramya Krishna
- Cinematography: V. Srinivasa Reddy
- Edited by: V. Nagireddy
- Music by: K. Veeru
- Production company: Sri Kaundisya films
- Release date: 26 February 2000
- Country: India
- Language: Telugu

Manasu Paddanu Kaani is a 2000 Indian Telugu-language romantic drama film produced by Vinobha Goud and directed by K. Veeru. The film features Venu, Ramya Krishna and Raasi in lead roles. The film's music is by K. Veeru. The film was a box office failure.

== Plot ==
Venu (Venu Thottempudi) is in love with Madhavi (Ramya Krishna) but tells Swati (Raasi) to act as his wife when his father's health starts deteriorating. Madhavi realises her love for Venu, but the latter finds himself being drawn to Swati.

== Cast ==
- Venu as Venu
- Ramya Krishna as Madhavi
- Raasi as Swati
- K. Viswanath as Venu's father
- S. P. Balasubrahmanyam as Swati's father
- Brahmanandam
- Kallu Chidambaram
- Nagendra Babu
- Tanikella Bharani
- AVS
- Ali
- M. S. Narayana
- Gundu Hanumantha Rao
- Prasad Babu
- Surya
- Bandla Ganesh
- Kalpana Rai
- Krishnaveni

== Soundtrack ==
The background score and songs were composed by K. Veeru. The soundtrack, released in 2000, features 10 tracks with lyrics written by Sahithi, Sirivennela Seetharama Sastry, Sai Harsha and Chandrabose.

Track	Song	Singer(s)	Lyrics	Duration
1	"Nenele Laali Pappa"	Krishnam Raju, Swarnalatha	Sahithi	
2	"Nenele Laali Pappa"	Sunitha Upadrashta	Chandrabose	
3	"Puvva Puvva Puvva"	Unni Krishnan, Sunitha Upadrashta	Chandrabose	
4	"Neepi Manasupadda Kaani"	Mano, Anuradha Sriram	Chandrabose	
5	"Love Feel" (Music)			
6	"Neekaina Thelisindha E Bhaavam"	Gopal Rao, Swarnalatha	Sirivennela Seetharama Sastry	
7	"Manasupaddanu Kaani"	Vijay Vardhan	Sai Harsha	
8	"Kalalonaa Neeve"	Vishwa	Sai Harsha	
9	"Premante Inthena"	Sunitha Upadrashta	Chandrabose	
10	"Guppadantha Gundelona Prema"	Swarnalatha, S. P. Balasubrahmanyam		

== Reception ==
Jeevi of Idlebrain.com wrote, "Only saving grace of this film is some neat photography by Sreenivasa Reddy and royal performance of K Vishwanath". A critic from Andhra Today noted, "Veeru K. does not make an impression with any of the departments - neither story nor direction, neither screen-play nor music - but tests the patience of the audience. A vain bid to make a movie by hashing out bits of various successful hits along with a copied comedy leave no impact on the audience".
