= Pellam Oorelithe =

- DVD cover
- Directed by: S. V. Krishna Reddy
- Story by: Sakthi Chidambaram
- Based on: Charlie Chaplin (Tamil)
- Produced by: Allu Aravind; C. Ashwani Dutt
- Dialogue by: Chintapalli Ramana
- Starring: Srikanth; Venu; Sangeetha; Rakshita
- Cinematography: C. Ramprasad
- Music by: Mani Sharma
- Production company: Siri Media Arts
- Release date: 15 January 2003
- Running time: 149 min
- Country: India
- Language: Telugu

Pellam Oorelithe (transl. When wife is out of town) is 2003 Indian Telugu-language comedy film directed by S. V. Krishna Reddy starring Srikanth, Venu, Sangeetha, and Rakshita. The film is a remake of Tamil film Charlie Chaplin (2002).

== Plot ==
Vivek (Srikanth) runs an advertisement agency. He is married to Sandhya (Sangeeta). Subbu (Venu Thottempudi) works as a photographer with Vivek. Vivek treats him as a brother. During a photo shoot, he happens to see Raaji (Rakshita) and falls in love with her. Samba (Sunil), a womanizer, sends a prostitute, Tilottama, to the guesthouse of Vivek when Sandhya prepares to visit her mother's house. When Tilottama arrives at Vivek's place, Sandhya suddenly comes back on some work and enquires Vivek who she is. In a hurry to cover up his act, Vivek lie to her that she is the wife of Subbu. This leads to so many problems for Vivek and Subbu. What happens when the wives come to know about their husbands' lies forms the climax.

== Cast ==
- Srikanth as Vivek
- Venu as Subbu
- Sangeetha as Sandhya
- Rakshita as Raaji
- Sunil as Samba
- Jyothi as Tilottama
- Brahmanandam as Hotel worker
- Gundu Hanumantha Rao as Tilottama's brother
- Suman Setty
- M. S. Narayana
- Giri Babu as Raaji's father
- Ali as Man in temple
- L. B. Sriram as Astrologer
- Jenny as Doctor

== Production ==
Sarada, Donga Donga Dorikadu and Aatalo Aata were the titles originally in consideration.

== Soundtrack ==
Music by Mani Sharma.

- "O Mallepoovuraa" - Udit Narayan, Kalpana
- "Milamila Merise" - S. P. Balasubrahmanyam, Gopika Poornima
- "Jhoom Sharabi" - Chakri, Mallikarjun, Gopika Poornima, Preethi
- "Ulakki Papa" - Karthik, Usha
- "Dondapandulanti" - Hariharan, Kalpana

== Reception ==
Jeevi of Idlebrain.com gave the film three-and-half stars out of five and stated that "This film is a clean comedy film from first frame to last frame." A critic from Sify praised the performances of the cast and wrote that the film is "Worth A Good Laugh".

== Accolades ==
Santosham Film Awards 2004

- Best Entertainment Film
