= Pottu Amman (film) =

- DVD cover of the Tamil version
- Directed by: K. Rajarathnam (Tamil); R. K. Selvamani (Telugu)
- Written by: R. B. Rathan; R. Selvaraj
- Produced by: S. Mathi; Ramprasad Reddy
- Starring: Venu; Roja; Suvaluxmi
- Cinematography: K. Rajarathnam
- Edited by: Anil Malnad
- Music by: S. D. Shanthakumar
- Production companies: Mangala Productions; Super Hit Films
- Release date: 8 December 2000
- Country: India
- Languages: Tamil; Telugu

Pottu Amman is a 2000 Indian Tamil-language devotional film directed by K. Rajarathinam and produced by Mangala Productions. It was simultaneously shot in Telugu as Durga, directed by R. K. Selvamani and produced by Ramprasad Reddy. The film featured Venu, Roja, Suvaluxmi and K. R. Vijaya. The film was publicised as actress Roja's 100th film and got released during the month of December 2000.

== Plot ==
Durga is an ardent devotee of the goddess Pottu Amman. But she marries a man against her father's wishes which makes her separated from the family. Durga also gives birth to a baby boy. An evil man enters the town to abduct the child and kills Durga. But Ganga and Navaneetham understand that the situation is tough, seek help from a goddess, and save the kid.

== Cast ==
- Venu as Pratap
- Roja in dual role as :
  - Durga
  - Pottu Amman
- Suvaluxmi as Ganga
- K. R. Vijaya as Navaneetham
- Manivannan (Tamil) / Tanikella Bharani (Telugu)
- Suresh Krishna as Prathmipadhi
- Raviraj
- Kadavul Kannan
- Thyagu
- Baby Sneha
- Kullamani
- Bayilvan Ranganathan
- Dubbing Janaki
- Ramyasri
- Raviraj
- Mannangatti Subramaniam
- Raman Nayar
- M. S. Narayana (Telugu)
- Visweswara Rao (Telugu)
- Ramya Krishnan as Amman (special appearance)

== Production ==
The film was directed by R. K. Selvamani, who opted to give his brother the directorial credits for the Tamil version, while he took credit for the Telugu version, Durga.

The film's release in Tamil was held up by financier Mukanchand Bothra, who filed a suit against Roja and her brother Kumarasamy Reddy for failing to repay a loan. Roja's husband and director R. K. Selvamani intervened and agreed to settle the dues.

== Soundtrack ==
Music by S. D. Shanthakumar.

Tamil

Song title	Singers
"Therku Pattam"	Krishnaraj, Devie Neithiyar, Krithika
"Kolusu Mani"	Swarnalatha, Unnikrishnan
"Oyyara Mayil"	Swarnalatha, K. S. Chithra, Bombay Jayashri
"Maalini Soolini"	Swarnalatha, Narayanan
"Eecha Maram"	K. S. Chithra
"Kannadichu Kannadichu"	Krishnaraj, Theni Kunjarammal
"Vennilave Vennilave"	SPB Charan, Theni Kunjarammal, Swarnalatha, Harini & Kalpana
"Veeramani Engae"	Swarnalatha

== Reception ==
A critic from go4i.com noted "This film has a decent script but again modern treatment somehow doesn't work too well with superstitions. Director Rajarathnam has been inspired by Hollywood's The Mummy in some parts." The Hindu gave the film a more critical review, stating that "the film shows that the director has made it with less of ideas and more of compromise". Regarding the Telugu version, a critic from Sify noted that it "lacks the distinctive touch of ace director R.K.Selvamani but it is bound to attract female audience since it is another devotional horror film laced with graphics".
