= Laya (actress) =

Indian actress and Kuchipudi dancer

- Born: 21 October 1981 (age 44); Vijayawada, Andhra Pradesh, India
- Occupations: Actress; dancer
- Years active: 1992–2010; 2018–present
- Spouse: Ganesh Gorty (m. 2006)

Laya (born 21 October 1981) is an Indian actress and Kuchipudi dancer known for her work primarily in Telugu films alongside a few Malayalam, Kannada and Tamil films. Laya first appeared as a child actor in Bhadram Koduko (1992) and later she started working as a lead actress with Swayamvaram (1999). She was runner up in the Star 2000 contest conducted to introduce new talent and has won three Nandi Awards including Special Jury Award and two Nandi Awards for Best Actress in consecutive years for Manoharam (2000) and Preminchu (2001).

== Personal life ==
Laya was born on 21 October 1981 in a Telugu family in Vijayawada, Andhra Pradesh. Her maiden name is Gorty. She attended Nirmala High School, Vijayawada, where her mother was a music teacher. Her father was a doctor. During her school days, she was a state level chess player. Later, she moved to Hyderabad and participated in multiple stage shows as a classical dancer, having performed in more than 50 stage shows. She has a Master's degree in Computer Applications. She married Dr. Sri Ganesh Gorty in 2006 and settled in Los Angeles, California. The couple has a daughter and a son.

== Filmography ==
=== Film ===
Key
†	Denotes films that have not yet been released

Year	Title	Role	Language	Notes
1992	Bhadram Koduko		Telugu	Debut film Child Artist
1999	Swayamvaram	Anu	Telugu	Debut film in a lead role
1999	Maa Balaji	Sujatha	Telugu	
2000	Kodanda Ramudu	Latha	Telugu	
2000	Manoharam	Usha	Telugu	
2000	Manasunna Maaraju	Amrutha	Telugu	
2000	Devullu	Sita Devi	Telugu	Cameo appearance
2001	Maduve Aagona Baa	Shanthi	Kannada	
2001	Maa Aavida Meeda Ottu Mee Aavida Chala Manchidi	Kanaka Durga	Telugu	
2001	Preminchu	Meena	Telugu	
2001	Ramma Chilakamma	Gayatri	Telugu	
2001	Naalo Unna Prema	Hema	Telugu	
2001	Hanuman Junction	Sangeetha	Telugu	
2002	Gelupu		Telugu	
2002	Nuvvu Leka Nenu Lenu	Neerja	Telugu	
2002	Kondaveeti Simhasanam	Varala	Telugu	
2002	Nee Premakai	Anjali	Telugu	
2002	Sri Bannari Amman	Bhavani	Tamil	
2002	Siva Rama Raju	Janaki	Telugu	
2003	Donga Ramudu and Party	Vasantha Lakshmi	Telugu	
2003	Pellamtho Panenti	Sireesha	Telugu	
2003	Nenu Pelliki Ready	Bhavana	Telugu	
2003	Missamma	Ratna Mala	Telugu	
2004	Veera Kannadiga	Lakshmi	Kannada	
2004	Gajendra	Indhu	Tamil	
2004	Vijayendra Varma	Indira	Telugu	
2004	Swarabhishekam	Surekha	Telugu	
2005	Thommanum Makkalum	Poonkavanam	Malayalam	
2005	Alice In Wonderland	Sofia	Malayalam	
2005	Udayon	Maya	Malayalam	
2005	Adirindayya Chandram	Rajyam	Telugu	
2005	Chanakya	Anjali	Tamil	
2006	Rashtram	Celeine	Malayalam	
2006	Gandugali Kumara Rama	Ramale	Kannada	
2006	Tata Birla Madhyalo Laila	Mahalakshmi	Telugu	
2010	Brahmalokam To Yamalokam Via Bhulokam	Aadi Parasakthi	Telugu	Cameo appearance
2018	Amar Akbar Anthony	Aishwarya's mother	Telugu	Cameo appearance
2025	Thammudu	Jhansi Kiranmyee	Telugu	
2026	Sampradayini Suppini Suddapoosani	Utthara	Telugu	
2026	Mister Middle Class	Padmavathi	Telugu	

=== Television ===
- Mega Bangaram Mee Kosam - 1 on Gemini TV as a host
- Sambavi on ETV
- Padutha Theeyaga on ETV as a host
- Bigg Boss 9 on Star Maa as a guest

== Awards and nominations ==
Nandi Awards

- Special Jury Award - Swayamvaram (1999)
- Best Actress - Manoharam (2000)
- Best Actress - Preminchu (2001)
