= Brahmanandam =

Indian actor and comedian

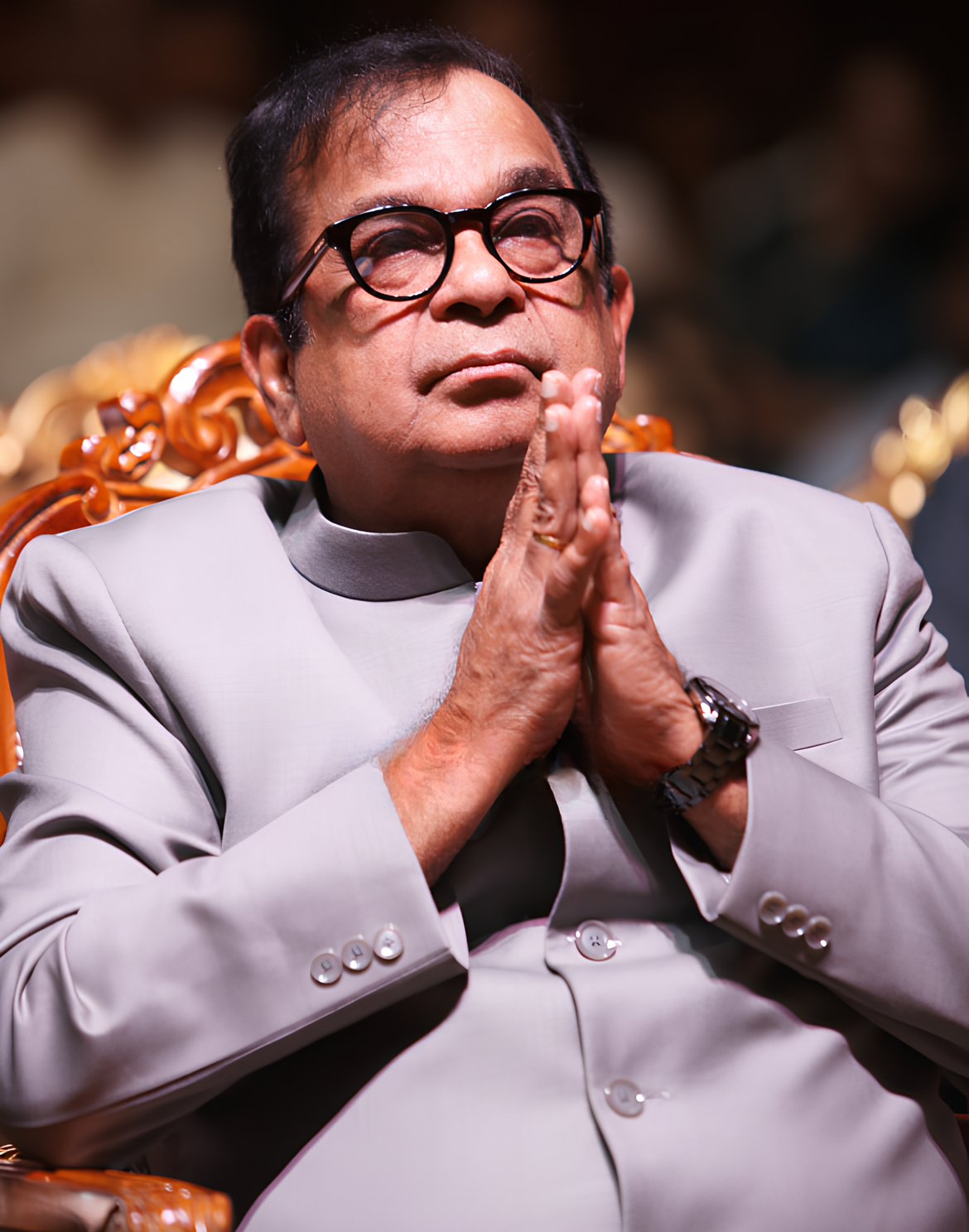
- Brahmanandam in 2024
- Born: Kanneganti Brahmanandam; 1 February 1956 (age 70); Sattenapalle, Andhra Pradesh, India
- Occupations: Actor; comedian
- Years active: 1985–present
- Works: Full list
- Spouse: Lakshmi
- Children: 2, including Raja Goutham
- Honours: Padma Shri (2009); Guinness World Record (2011)

Kanneganti Brahmanandam (born 1 February 1956) is an Indian actor and comedian known for his work in Telugu cinema. Recognised as one of India's finest and highest-paid comic actors, he holds the Guinness World Record for the most screen credits for a living actor, having appeared in over 1,000 films. Brahmanandam has received numerous accolades, including six Nandi Awards and two Filmfare Awards, and was honoured with the Padma Shri, India's fourth-highest civilian award, in 2009. He was also awarded an honorary doctorate by Acharya Nagarjuna University.

After completing his Master of Arts degree, Brahmanandam worked as a Telugu lecturer in Attili of West Godavari district. Simultaneously, he also worked in theatre and as a mimicry artist. He made his television debut in 1985 with DD Telugu's Pakapakalu which received appreciation from the audience. After watching his performance in the show, director Jandhyala cast him in the film Aha Naa Pellanta! (1987), which became his breakthrough role.

== Early life ==
Brahmanandam was born on 1 February 1956 in a Telugu family in Chaganti Vari Palem village, Sattenapalli, Andhra Pradesh. His parents are Nagalingachari and Lakshmi Narsamma. His father was a carpenter and Brahmanandam was one of eight children. He completed his Master of Arts degree and joined as a Telugu lecturer in Attili of West Godavari district.

== Career ==
While working as a lecturer, Brahmanandam also worked in theatre and as a mimicry artist. Novelist and playwright Adi Vishnu introduced him to NCV Sashidhar of Doordarshan (DD). Soon after, he made his television debut in 1985 with DD Telugu's Pakapakalu. His performance in the show received good response from the audience. After watching his performance in the show, director Jandhyala cast him in the film Aha Naa Pellanta! (1987), which became a breakthrough role for him. The same year he appeared in the successful films Pasivadi Pranam and Swayam Krushi. The first film he acted in was Sri Tatavataram, second film was Satyagraham, and the third film was Aha Naa Pellanta!. Sri Tatavataram released later in 1988.

The following years he appeared in several Telugu films, of which, his performance in the films Vivaha Bhojanambu (1988), Choopulu Kalisina Shubhavela (1988), Bandhuvulostunnaru Jagratha (1989), Muddula Mavayya (1989), Jagadeka Veerudu Atiloka Sundari (1990), Bobbili Raja (1990) and Bamma Maata Bangaru Baata (1990) was well praised.

Beginning from 1991, Brahmanandam has appeared in variety of comedic roles and a few intense roles. In 1991, he starred in major films such as Kshana Kshanam (1991) and Rowdy Alludu (1991). The Times of India considered the films Chitram Bhalare Vichitram (1991), Jamba Lakidi Pamba (1992), and Yamaleela (1994) as the films that one can never get bored of. Brahmanandam has appeared in each of these, with him being considered as one of the main reasons for these films to be successful. In 1992, he has played the lead role in Babai Hotel for the first time.

He won his first major award—Nandi Award for Best Male Comedian for his performance as Khan Dada in the film Money (1993). Following the success of the film, a sequel to it, Money Money (1994) was also produced, in which Brahmanandam reprised his role. Griddaluru Gopalrao of Zamin Ryot in his review of the film Hello Brother (1994) praised Brahmanandam's role and his performance. His further successful films of the following years include Alluda Majaka (1995), Intlo Illalu Vantintlo Priyuralu (1996), Bombay Priyudu (1996), Anaganaga Oka Roju (1997), Muddula Mogudu (1997), Bavagaru Bagunnara (1998), Aavida Maa Aavide (1998), Thammudu (1999), Kshemamga Velli Labhamga Randi (2000), Jayam Manade Raa (2000), Kalisundam Raa (2000), and Ammo! Okato Tareekhu (2000).

At a felicitation ceremony in January 2008, he listed the following films as his top 11 films — Aha Naa Pellanta! (1987), Vivaha Bhojanambu (1988), Chitram Bhalare Vichitram (1991), Pattukondi Chuddam (1997), Money (1993), Anaganaga Oka Roju (1997), Anna (1994), Amma (1991), Bavagaru Bagunnara (1998), Manmadhudu (2002), Dhee (2007).

== Personal life ==
Brahmanandam married Lakshmi and has two sons, Raja Goutham and Siddharth.

In January 2019, Brahmanandam underwent a successful heart bypass surgery at Asian Heart Institute (AHI) in Mumbai.

Apart from acting, Brahmanandam is also an amateur sculptor and a sketch artist. He also reads the philosophical writings of Swami Vivekananda and Jiddu Krishnamurthi in his free time.

== Awards and honours ==
Civilian honors

- In January 2009, the government of India bestowed Padma Shri, the fourth-highest civilian award of India, on Brahmanandam for his contributions to art.

Guinness Book

- Guinness World Record for the most screen credits for a living actor.

Filmfare Awards

- Best Comedian – Telugu – Manmadhudu (2003)
- Best Supporting Actor – Telugu – Ranga Maarthaanda (2024)

Nandi Awards

- Best Male Comedian – Money (1993)
- Best Supporting Actor – Anna (1994)
- Best Comedian – Anaganaga Oka Roju (1995)
- Best Comedian – Vinodam (1996)
- Best Comedian – Ready (2008)
- Best Comedian – Race Gurram (2014)

CineMAA Awards

- CineMAA Award for Best Comedian – Manmadhudu, Dhee, Konchem Ishtam Konchem Kashtam, Adhurs & Dookudu

South Indian International Movie Awards

- Best Comedian – Telugu – Dookudu (2012)
- Best Comedian – Telugu – Baadshah (2014)
- Best Comedian – Telugu – Race Gurram (2015)

Other

- Hyderabad Times Film Awards Best Actor in a Comic Role – Dookudu (2011)
- TSR – TV9 National Film Award for Best Comedian – Attarintiki Daredi (2014)
- IIFA Utsavam Supporting Male Actor – Telugu – Ranga Maarthaanda (2024)

== Filmography ==
Brahmanandam acted in more than 1,000 films.
