= Ali (actor) =

Indian actor, TV presenter (born 1967)

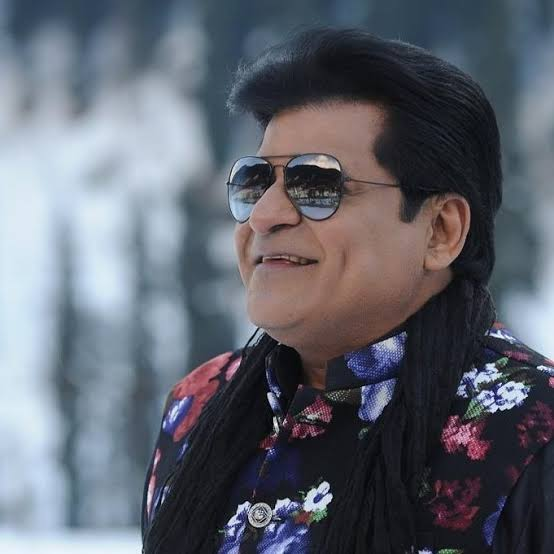
- Ali in 2019
- Born: 10 October 1967 (age 59); Rajahmundry, Andhra Pradesh, India
- Occupations: Actor; television presenter
- Years active: 1990–present
- Works: Full list
- Other political affiliations: YSR Congress Party (2019–2024); Telugu Desam Party (1999–2019)
- Spouse: Zubeda Sultana
- Relatives: Khayyum (brother)
- Awards: Filmfare Award for Best Comedian – Telugu

Mohammed Ali (born 10 October 1967), known professionally as Ali, is an Indian actor, comedian, and television presenter who works predominantly in Telugu films and television. He acted in more than 1000 films in Telugu. He is a recipient of two Nandi Awards and two Filmfare Awards South.

== Personal life ==
Ali was born in Rajahmundry, Andhra Pradesh, India, to a Telugu-speaking Muslim family. His father was a tailor and his mother was a home maker. He has one younger brother named Khayyum, who is also an actor. Ali married Zubeda Sultana in 1994. The couple has two daughters and a son.

== Career ==
Ali came into the movie industry with the help of Jit Mohan Mitra, Rajahmundry's musical company. He went to Chennai when director Bharathi Raja was looking for child actors for his movie Seethakoka Chiluka, and was given a role. As a child, Ali acted in several movies. When he was too old to be a child actor he struggled to get roles and later became a comedian in Telugu cinema. Director S. V. Krishna Reddy gave him comic roles in his movies, creating new roles for him. Ali developed his own style including his Katravalli dialogue and "Endha Chaata" dialogue in Rajendrudu Gajendrudu (1993). Ali acted in the 2010 Kannada film, Super, which was acclaimed.

Ali is a brand ambassador for anti-itching medicine Manmohan Jaadoo Malaam. He became the host for a talkie show called Ali Talkies on MAA TV. He also hosts the popular talk show Alitho Saradaga on ETV. He also made his Jabardasth debut as an ad hoc judge of the show.

== Political career ==
Ali joined YSRCP on 11 March 2019. He was appointed as Electronic Media Adviser to Government of Andhra Pradesh on 27 October 2022. Ali quit Politics on 28 June 2024.

== Awards ==
Year	Award	Category	Film	Result	Ref.
1981	Nandi Awards	Best Child Actor	Seethakoka Chiluka	Won	
1996	Nandi Awards	Special Jury Award	Pittala Dora	Won	
2003	Filmfare Awards	Filmfare Best Comedian Award (Telugu)	Amma Nanna O Tamila Ammayi	Won	
2005	Filmfare Awards	Filmfare Best Comedian Award (Telugu)	Super	Won	
