= List of awards and nominations received by N. T. Rama Rao Jr. =

N. T. Rama Rao Jr. awards and nominations
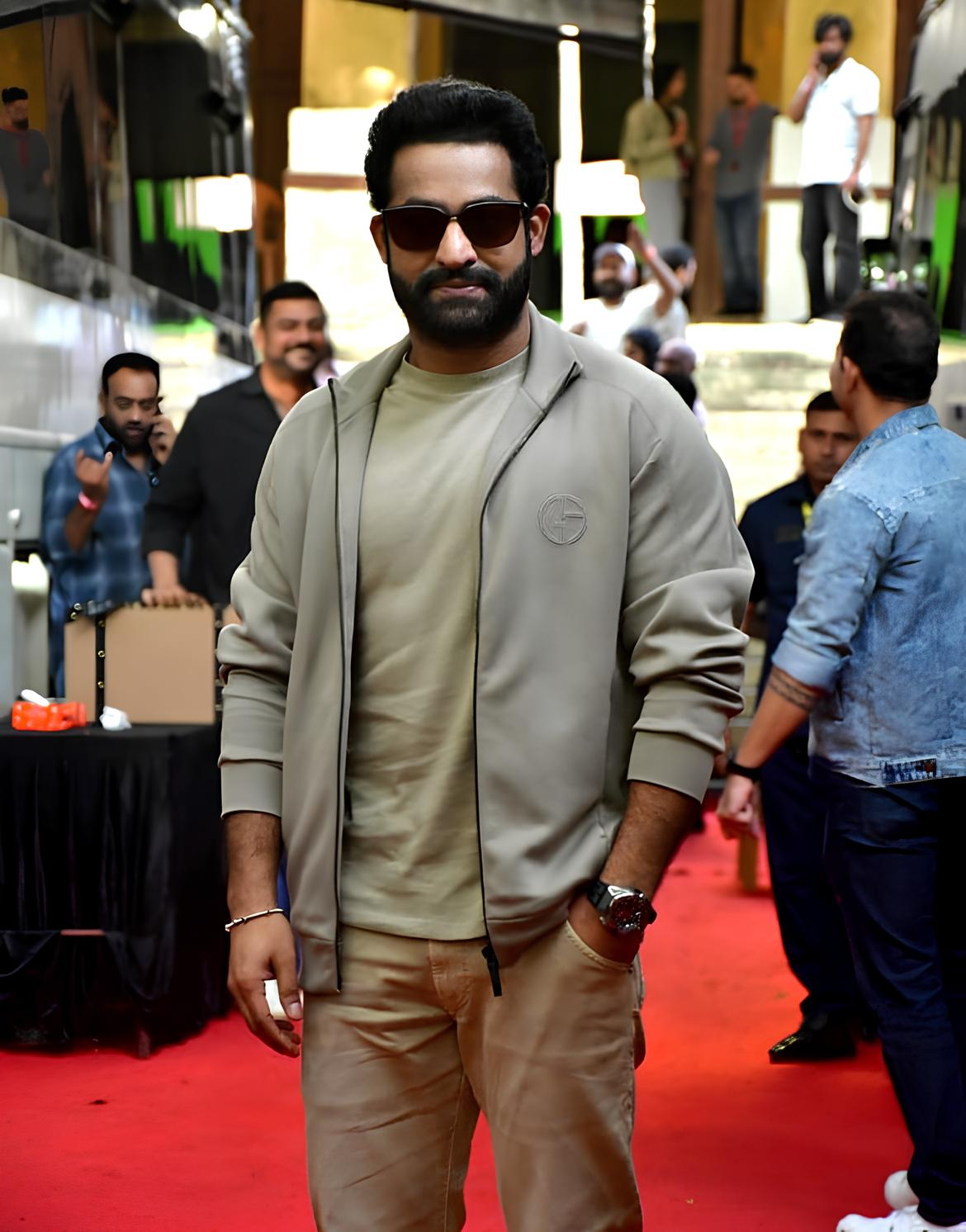
- Rama Rao Jr. in 2022
Awards and nominations
Award	Wins	Nominations

Totals (Note: Certain award groups do not simply award one winner. They acknowledge several different recipients, have runners-up, and have third place. Since this is a specific recognition and is different from losing an award, runner-up mentions are considered wins in this award tally. For simplification and to avoid errors, each award in this list has been presumed to have had a prior nomination.)
- Wins: 23
- Nominations: 51

N. T. Rama Rao Jr. is an Indian actor, producer, and television presenter who primarily works in Telugu cinema. Rao first appeared as a child artist in the film Brahmarshi Viswamitra, written, directed and starred by his grandfather N. T. Rama Rao in 1991. He went on to play the titular role as Rama in the 1997 mythological film Ramayanam. Rao made his debut as a lead actor in 2001 with the film Ninnu Choodalani, which was a box office failure. He tasted his first success in the same year with the S. S. Rajamouli's directorial debut, coming-of-age action film Student No: 1.

Though Subbu which released in the same year could not impress the audience, his 2002 action film Aadi was a massive success. For the film, Rao received Nandi Special Jury Award presented by the Government of Andhra Pradesh. The two next films Allari Ramudu and Naaga were back-to-back failures. His second collaboration with the director S. S. Rajamouli was the 2003 action film Simhadri, which ended up as one of the biggest blockbusters of that year. In the film, Rao is seen as a kind-hearted man, Simhadri who has a violent past. In 2004, Rao played a dual role for the first time film Andhrawala directed by Puri Jagannadh. The film could not reach the high expectations and bombed at the box office. Samba which released in the same year had a decent response but his subsequent films Naa Alludu, Narasimhudu and Ashok were a string of failures.

In 2007, Rao made his third collaboration with the director S. S. Rajamouli for the socio-fantasy film, Yamadonga. For this film, the actor made a complete body transformation and shed extra kilos. The film was praised for its unique story and performances and became one of the biggest hits of that year. Rao has won his first Filmfare Award as Best Actor – Telugu for the film. For RRR, Rao’s performance earned him several nominations including Best Actor in an Action Movie at the Critics' Choice Super Awards.

== Major Associations ==
=== Critics' Choice Super Awards ===
Year	Category	Nominated work	Result	Ref.
2023	Best Actor in a Leading Role	RRR	Nominated	

=== Indiana Film Journalists Association, US ===
Year	Category	Nominated work	Result	Ref.
2023	Best Lead Performance	RRR	Nominated	

=== Nandi Awards ===
Year	Category	Nominated work	Result	Ref.
2002	Special Jury Award	Aadi	Won	
2016	Best Actor	Nannaku Prematho and Janatha Garage	Won	

=== Filmfare Awards ===
Year	Category	Nominated work	Result	Ref.
2003	Best Actor – Telugu	Aadi	Nominated	
2004	Best Actor – Telugu	Simhadri	Nominated	
2007	Best Actor – Telugu	Rakhi	Nominated	
2008	Best Actor – Telugu	Yamadonga	Won	
2009	Best Actor – Telugu	Kantri	Nominated	
2011	Best Actor – Telugu	Adhurs	Nominated	
2016	Best Actor – Telugu	Temper	Nominated	
2017	Best Actor – Telugu	Nannaku Prematho	Won	
2018	Best Actor – Telugu	Jai Lava Kusa	Nominated	
2019	Best Actor – Telugu	Aravinda Sametha Veera Raghava	Nominated	
2023	Best Actor – Telugu	RRR	Won	
2026	Best Actor – Telugu	Devara: Part 1	Nominated	

=== South Indian International Movie Awards ===
Year	Category	Nominated work	Result	Ref.
2017	Best Actor – Telugu	Janatha Garage	Won	
2017	Best Male Playback Singer – Kannada	"Geleya Geleya" (from Chakravyuha)	Nominated	
2018	Best Actor – Telugu	Jai Lava Kusa	Nominated	
2019	Best Actor – Telugu	Aravinda Sametha Veera Raghava	Nominated	
2023	Best Actor – Telugu	RRR	Won	
2025	Best Actor – Telugu	Devara: Part 1	Nominated	

== Miscellaneous Awards ==
Award	Year	Category	Work	Result	Ref.
Bollywood Life Awards	2023	Best Actor – South	RRR	Nominated	
Bangkok Movie Awards	2024	Best Actor	Devara: Part 1	Won	
CineMAA Awards	2003	Best Actor	Aadi	Won	
CineMAA Awards	2004	Best Actor	Simhadri	Won	
CineMAA Awards	2008	Best Actor	Yamadonga	Won	
CineMAA Awards	2011	Best Actor	Adhurs	Nominated	
CineMAA Awards	2011	Best Actor	Brindavanam	Nominated	
CineMAA Awards	2012	Best Actor	Oosaravelli	Nominated	
CineMAA Awards	2013	Best Actor	Dammu	Nominated	
CineMAA Awards	2016	Best Actor	Temper	Won	
FNCC Awards	2004	Best Actor	Simhadri	Won	
Gemini TV Awards	2008	Best Actor	Yamadonga	Won	
Gold List Award	2023	Best Performance in a Leading Role	RRR		
IIFA Utsavam	2016	Best Actor – Telugu	Temper	Nominated	
IIFA Utsavam	2017	Best Actor – Telugu	Janatha Garage	Won	
Mirchi Music Awards South	2016	Star As A Singing Sensation – Telugu	"Follow Follow" (from Nannaku Prematho (Follow Follow))	Won	
Mirchi Music Awards South	2016	Star As A Singing Sensation – Kannada	"Geleya Geleya" (from Chakravyuha)	Won	
Nickelodeon Kids' Choice Awards India	2023	Favorite Movie Actor (South)	RRR	Nominated	
Santosham Film Awards	2004	Best Young Performer	Simhadri	Won	
Santosham Film Awards	2016	Best Actor	Temper	Nominated	
Santosham Film Awards	2017	Best Actor	Janatha Garage	Nominated	
Santosham Film Awards	2023	Best Actor	RRR	Nominated	
South Scope Awards	2009	Stylish Male Actor – Telugu	Kantri	Won	
TSR– TV9 National Film Awards	2011	Best Actor	Adhurs and Brindavanam	Won	
TSR– TV9 National Film Awards	2014	Best Actor	Baadshah	Won	
TSR– TV9 National Film Awards	2016	Best Actor	Temper	Nominated	
TSR– TV9 National Film Awards	2017	Best Actor	Janatha Garage	Won	
Zee Cine Awards Telugu	2017	King of Box Office	Janatha Garage	Won	
Zee Cine Awards Telugu	2018	Best Actor	Jai Lava Kusa	Nominated	
Zee Cine Awards	2026	Best Actor in a Negative Role	War 2	Nominated	

== See also ==
- N. T. Rama Rao Jr filmography
