= N. T. Rama Rao Jr. filmography =

N. T. Rama Rao Jr filmography
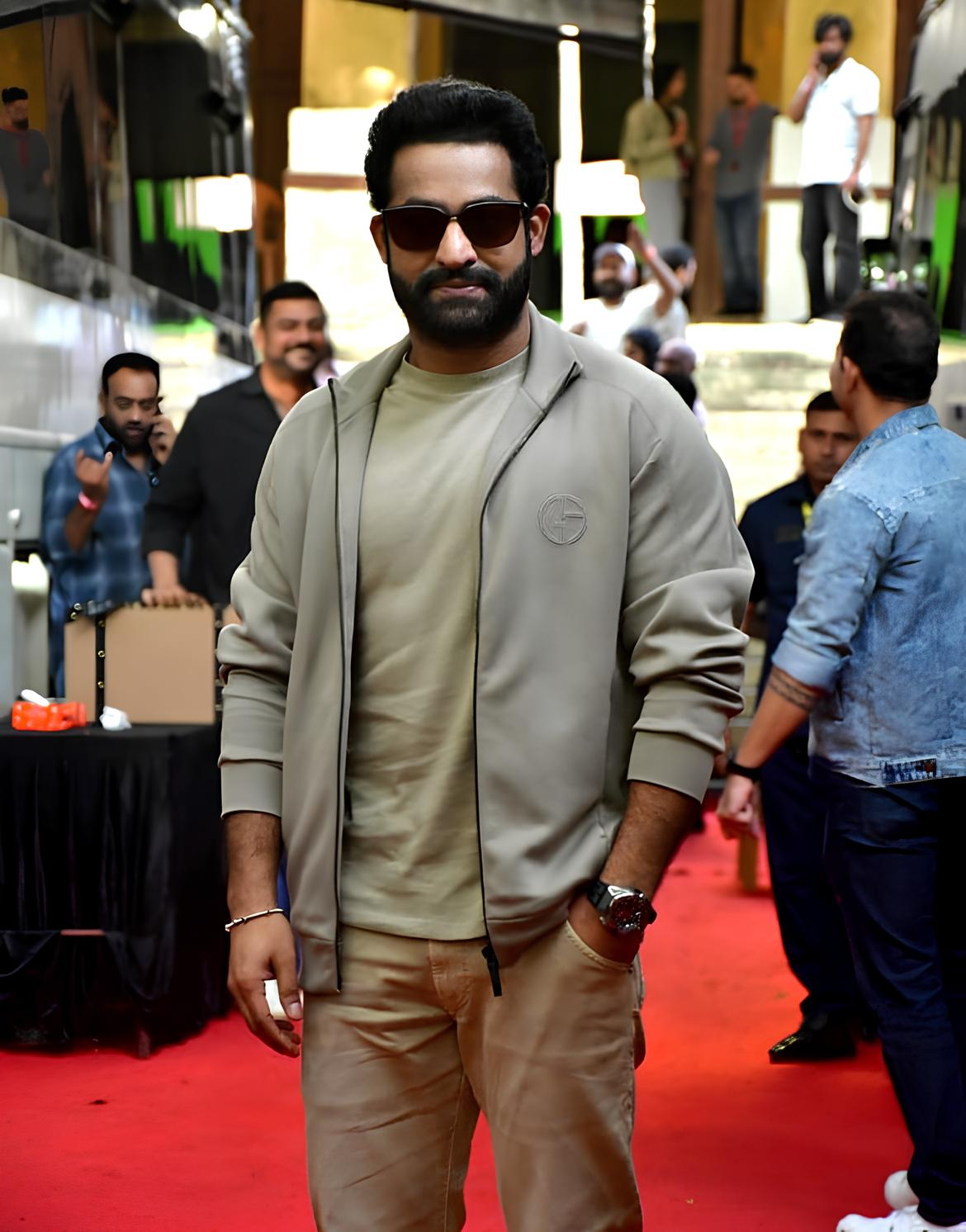
- NTR Jr. in 2024
- Film: 35
- Television show: 2

N. T. Rama Rao Jr (born 20 May 1983), also known as NTR Jr., is an Indian actor and television personality who works in Telugu cinema. He has appeared in 31 films and is the recipient of three Filmfare Awards, two Nandi Awards, and two SIIMA Awards.

NTR first appeared as a child artist in the film to play the titular role as god Rama in the 1997 mythological film Ramayanam. Rao made his debut as an adult lead actor in 2001 with the film Ninnu Choodalani. He achieved his breakthrough in the same year with the S. S. Rajamouli's directorial debut, the coming-of-age film Student No: 1.

While Subbu which was released in the same year could not impress the audience, his 2002 action film Aadi was a massive box office success. For the film, Rao received Nandi Special Jury Award presented by the Government of Andhra Pradesh. The two next films Allari Ramudu and Naaga were back-to-back failures. His second collaboration with the director S. S. Rajamouli was the 2003 action film Simhadri, which ended up as one of the biggest blockbusters of that year. In the film, Rao is seen as a kind-hearted man, Simhadri who has a violent past. In 2004, Rao played a dual role for the first time film Andhrawala directed by Puri Jagannadh. The film could not reach the high expectations of the audience and bombed at the box office. Samba which released in the same year had a good response but his subsequent films Naa Alludu, Narasimhudu and Ashok were a string of failures.

In 2006, Rao starred in the film Rakhi. Although the film was an average grosser, his performance as an innocent man turned vigilante, particularly in the climax sequence, was highly praised. In 2007, Rao made his third collaboration with the director S. S. Rajamouli for the socio-fantasy film, Yamadonga. For this film, the actor made a complete body transformation and shed extra kilos. The film was praised for its unique story and performances and became one of the biggest hits of that year. Rao won his first Filmfare Award as Best Actor – Telugu for the film.

In 2010, Rao featured in two films, Adhurs and Brindavanam, both of them were successful ventures and became an integral part of Telugu pop culture. Over the next few years, Rao starred in several films, notably Oosaravelli and Baadshah. His consequent films, Ramayya Vasthavayya and Rabhasa were box office failures which received lukewarm response both audience and his fans alike, for which Rao was deeply disappointed and promised his fans to work harder. In 2015, Rao made his second collaboration with the director Puri Jagannadh in the action film Temper which gave the actor a much needed comeback. In the film, he played a corrupt police officer, whose life changes after stumbling upon a rape case. In his landmark 25th film, Rao featured in the 2016 thriller – drama, Nannaku Prematho written and directed by Sukumar. The film explored emotional relationship between a father and his son spanning the last 30 days of the father's life. Despite being an average grosser domestically, the film performed exceedingly well in the overseas. In the same year, his film Janatha Garage, directed by Koratala Siva and co-starred by Malayalam film superstar Mohanlal, became the highest-grossing Tollywood film of that year collecting nearly ₹1.40 billion. In 2017, Rao played triple role for the first time in the action film Jai Lava Kusa which also grossed more than ₹1 billion. In the same year, he featured as the host for the first season of the television series Bigg Boss.

In 2018, the actor teamed up with the director Trivikram for the action drama film, Aravinda Sametha Veera Raghava. In the film, Rao played a young man who decides to put an end to the bloodshed between two warring villages. The film received positive feedback, with Rao's performance being well received. In 2021, Rao returned to television as a host for the game show Evaru Meelo Koteeswarulu, the Telugu version of Who Wants to Be a Millionaire?. In his fourth collaboration with the director S. S. Rajamouli, Rao played the role of the Indian revolutionary, Komaram Bheem in the period action film RRR. The film became a global phenomenon, receiving appreciation from India and overseas. The performance of Rao as Komaram Bheem has been lauded by the audience and critics alike. He carefully finalised the script for his first film post RRR, and collaborated with Koratala Siva after Janatha Garage for Devara: Part 1 which opened to mixed reviews but became a huge commercial success. He also made his Hindi cinema debut with War 2, the sequel to War (2019), in which he co-starred with Hrithik Roshan. The film is a part of the YRF Spy Universe. His next film, titled Dragon will be directed by Prashanth Neel.

== Film ==
Key
†	Denotes films that have not yet been released

- All films in this list are in Telugu unless otherwise indicated.

List of N. T. Rama Rao Jr. film credits as an actorList of N. T. Rama Rao Jr film credits
Year	Title	Role(s)	Notes	Ref.
1991	Brahmarshi Viswamitra	Bharata	Child Actor	
1997	Ramayanam	Rama	Child Actor	
2001	Ninnu Choodalani	Venu Reddy	Debut as lead actor	
2001	Student No: 1	Aditya Rao		
2001	Subbu	Bala Subramanyam		
2002	Aadhi	Aadhi Kesava Reddy		
2002	Allari Ramudu	Ramakrishna		
2003	Naaga	Nagaraju		
2003	Simhadri	Simhadri / Singamalai (Note: Rao played a single character with two or more names.)		
2004	Andhrawala	Munna / Shankar Pehelwan (Note: Rao performed dual roles in the film.)		
2004	Samba	Samba Shiva Naidu		
2005	Naa Alludu	Karthik "Suryam" / Murugan		
2005	Narasimhudu	Kondaveedi Narasimhudu		
2006	Ashok	Ashok		
2006	Rakhi	K. Ramakrishna / Rakhi		
2007	Yamadonga	Raja / Young Yama Dharma Raja		
2008	Kantri	Kranthi "Kantri"		
2008	Chintakayala Ravi	Himself	Special appearance in the song "Shaava Shaava"	
2010	Adhurs	Narasimha / Chari		
2010	Rama Rama Krishna Krishna	Narrator	Voice role	
2010	Brindavanam	Krishna "Krish"		
2011	Sakthi	Sakthi Swaroop / Maha Rudra		
2011	Oosaravelli	Tony		
2012	Dammu	Ramachandra / Raja Vijay Dhwaja Sri Simha		
2013	Baadshah	N. T. Rama Rao / Baadshah		
2013	Ramayya Vasthavayya	Nandu / Ramu		
2014	Rabhasa	Karthik		
2015	Temper	Daya		
2016	Nannaku Prematho	Abhiram	25th film	
2016	Janatha Garage	Anand		
2017	Jai Lava Kusa	Jai Kumar "Raavan" / Lava Kumar / Kusa Kumar (Note: Rao plays triple roles in the film.)		
2018	Aravinda Sametha Veera Raghava	Veera Raghava Reddy		
2022	RRR	Komaram Bheem		
2024	Devara: Part 1	Devara / Vara		
2025	War 2	Major Vikram Chelapathi	Hindi film	
2027	Dragon †	Luger / Dragon	Filming	
2028	Ntr X Trivikram †	Lord Murugan	Announced	

== Television ==
Title	Role	Network	Notes	Ref.
1996	Bhaktha Markandeya	Bhaktha Markandeya	ETV	Cameo
2017	Bigg Boss 1	Host	Star Maa	
2021	Evaru Meelo Koteeswarulu	Host	Gemini TV	
2024	Modern Masters: S. S. Rajamouli	Himself	Netflix	Documentary film
2024	RRR: Behind and Beyond	Himself	Netflix	Documentary film
