= N. T. Rama Rao Jr. filmography and awards =

N. T. Rama Rao Jr. is an Indian actor who primarily works in Telugu cinema.

- For his filmography, see N. T. Rama Rao Jr. filmography.
- For his awards and nominations for awards, see List of awards and nominations received by N. T. Rama Rao Jr.
