= N. T. Rama Rao Jr. =

Indian actor (born 1983)

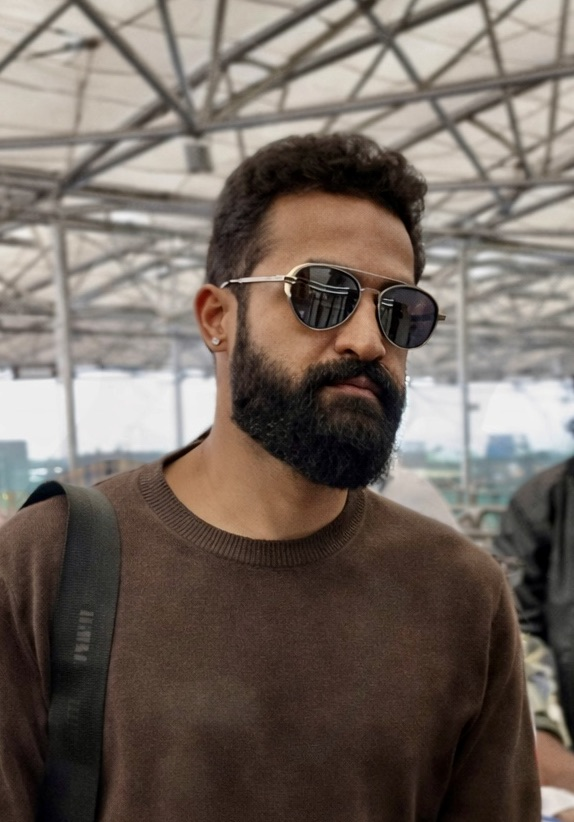
- Rama Rao Jr. in 2026
- Born: Nandamuri Taraka Rama Rao Jr. 20 May 1983 (age 43); Hyderabad, Andhra Pradesh, India (now in Telangana, India)
- Other name: Tarak
- Occupations: Actor; television presenter; Singer
- Years active: 2001–present
- Works: Full list
- Spouse: Lakshmi Pranathi (m. 2011)
- Children: 2
- Father: Nandamuri Harikrishna
- Family: Nandamuri family
- Awards: Full list

Nandamuri Taraka Rama Rao Jr. (born 20 May 1983), popularly known as NTR Jr, is an Indian actor, and television presenter who primarily works in Telugu cinema. He is one of the highest-paid actors in Indian cinema and has been featured in Forbes India's Celebrity 100 list since 2012. Referred to in the media as the Man of Masses, he has starred in over 30 films. He is a recipient of several accolades including, three Filmfare Awards South, three CineMAA Awards, a SIIMA Award, a IIFA Award and two Nandi Awards.

The grandson of Indian matinee idol and former Chief Minister of Andhra Pradesh, N. T. Rama Rao, Rama Rao Jr. appeared as a child actor in Brahmarshi Viswamitra (1991) and the National Film Award-winning Ramayanam (1997). He made his debut as a lead actor with Ninnu Choodalani (2001) and achieved his breakthrough with the coming-of-age film Student No: 1 (2001) and the action drama Aadi (2002). This was followed by a string of commercially successful films including Simhadri (2003), Rakhi (2006), Yamadonga (2007), Adhurs (2010), Brindavanam (2010), and Baadshah (2013).

After a brief period of box-office setbacks, he made a strong comeback with the action drama Temper (2015) and continued his success streak with Nannaku Prematho (2016), Janatha Garage (2016), Jai Lava Kusa (2017), and Aravinda Sametha Veera Raghava (2018). He then starred in the magnum opus RRR (2022), which became a global phenomenon, earning him Pan-India fame and international recognition, including a nomination for Best Actor in an Action Movie at the Critics' Choice Super Awards. The film emerged as one of the highest-grossing Indian films of all time. He followed it up with action drama Devara: Part 1 (2024), which continued his streak of box office successes.

Rama Rao Jr. also hosted the first season of the Telugu-language reality TV show Bigg Boss (2017) and the fifth season of Evaru Meelo Koteeswarulu (2021). A trained Kuchipudi dancer, he is widely regarded as one of the finest dancers in Indian cinema. He is also one of the few polyglots of Indian cinema.

== Early life and family ==
Nandamuri Taraka Rama Rao was born on 20 May 1983 to film actor and politician, Nandamuri Harikrishna and Shalini Bhaskar Rao. His father is of Telugu descent and was born and raised at Nimmakuru, in Krishna district of Andhra Pradesh. His mother hails from Kundapur, Karnataka. He is the grandson of Telugu actor and former Chief Minister of Andhra Pradesh, N. T. Rama Rao, whom he was named after.

Rama Rao Jr. did his schooling at Vidyaranya High School, Hyderabad, and completed his intermediate education at St. Mary's College, Hyderabad. He also studied in Krishna district of Andhra Pradesh for some time. Rama Rao Jr. is a trained Kuchipudi dancer.

== Career ==
=== 1991–2003: Breakthrough and stardom ===
N. T. Rama Rao Jr.'s acting journey began early with a cameo in the 1991 film Brahmarshi Viswamitra, appearing alongside his grandfather, the Indian matinee idol N. T. Rama Rao. In 1997, he made his debut as a child artist in the title role of Rama in the mythological film Ramayanam, directed by Gunasekhar. The film won the National Film Award for Best Children's Film, and his performance received critical acclaim. Director K. Raghavendra Rao, impressed by his performance in Ramayanam and later auditions, recommended him to S. S. Rajamouli for his directorial debut Student No: 1 (2001). Around the same time, producer Ramoji Rao signed him for the romantic drama Ninnu Choodalani (2001), which marked his debut as a lead actor at just 18 years of age. Student No: 1, which released later that year, became a commercial success, establishing him as a promising young talent, while Subbu (2001) that followed had an average performance at the box office.

His major breakthrough came with V. V. Vinayak’s Aadi (2002), in which he portrayed a young man seeking revenge against a powerful landlord for his parents’ deaths. The film became one of the highest-grossing Telugu films of the year and solidified his mass appeal. He subsequently appeared in Allari Ramudu (2002) directed by B. Gopal, and the political drama Naaga (2003) produced by A. M. Rathnam. Both films underperformed at the box office, although Naaga received critical acclaim for its political themes and Rama Rao Jr.'s performance. In 2003, Rama Rao Jr. reunited with S. S. Rajamouli for Simhadri, made on a budget of ₹8.5 crore. The film became the highest-grossing Telugu film of all time upon release, cementing his stardom and earning him his first Filmfare Award for Best Actor – Telugu. For the role, he adopted a more rugged and mature look, shedding his earlier youthful image. His intense performance and commanding screen presence at just 19 earned him the moniker "Young Tiger", a title that has remained associated with him since.

=== 2004–2010: Career fluctuations and comeback ===
Rama Rao Jr. next appeared in Puri Jagannadh's action drama Andhrawala (2004).The film's pre-release hype was historic, marked by a record-breaking public gathering of over 10 lakh (1 million) fans, reportedly the largest such turnout for any actor in India. Despite this unprecedented anticipation, the film ultimately proved to be a box office failure. He then starred in action film, Samba (2004) in his second collaboration with V. V. Vinayak. He went on to star in the family drama Naa Alludu (2005), in which he played a dual role, as well as Narasimhudu (2005), both films proved unsuccessful at the box office. In 2006, he then appeared in Surender Reddy's Ashok, which was an average grosser. A critical and commercial bright spot during this period, however, was his powerful performance in Krishna Vamsi's Rakhi (2006). The film emerged as a sleeper hit and the role is widely considered one of the finest performances by an actor in Telugu cinema.

His career regained its momentum with his third collaboration with S. S. Rajamouli in the socio-fantasy film Yamadonga (2007). In a remarkable physical transformation, he shed over 20 kg for the role, dropping from 94 kg to portray Raja, a cunning thief who confronts the god of death, Yama. It also featured him delivering one of the longest monologues that too in Grandhika Telugu for any actor of his generation, showcasing his exceptional command of the language and vocal delivery. The film was a critical and commercial success, earning him his second Filmfare Award for Best Actor – Telugu. He next starred in the action film Kantri (2008) before taking a year-long hiatus in 2009 to actively campaign for the Telugu Desam Party (TDP) in the general elections.

Returning to cinema, he headlined the action-comedy Adhurs (2010), playing dual roles for the third time in his career. The film was a major commercial success, largely driven by his performance as Chari, a timid priest. The role is widely regarded as one of the finest comic performances in Telugu cinema and has since become an iconic pop culture reference. He then shifted gears to star in the romantic comedy Brindavanam (2011), marking his return to the genre after several years. The film went on to become another critical and commercial success and was later remade in six other languages.

=== 2011–2021: Setback and reinvention ===
In 2011, Rama Rao Jr. collaborated with director Meher Ramesh for the fantasy action film Shakthi, which underperformed at the box office, attributed to its high production cost. This was followed by the action thriller Oosaravelli (2011), his second venture with director Surender Reddy, which was a box office success. He next starred in the action drama Dammu (2012), which became an average grosser. In 2013, he underwent a complete physical transformation for Srinu Vaitla's action comedy Baadshah, straightening his curly hair and growing a beard to suit his role as a mafia don. The film was a commercial success and was later premiered at the Osaka Asian Film Festival in 2014. However, his next two releases, Ramayya Vasthavayya (2013) and Rabhasa (2014), were box office failures, marking a low phase in his career.

Rama Rao Jr. on the sets of Janatha Garage with Mohanlal

A significant turning point came with Puri Jagannadh's Temper (2015). The film was a major critical and commercial success, with Rama Rao Jr's performance as a corrupt police officer Daya receiving widespread acclaim. This film is widely seen as the project where he successfully reinvented himself moving beyond a purely commercial action hero image. Building on this momentum, he starred in Sukumar's drama Nannaku Prematho (2016), for which he sported a new look and won his third Filmfare Award for Best Actor – Telugu. The film became the highest-grossing film of his career at that time. Later that year, he featured in Koratala Siva's Janatha Garage (2016), it registered the highest opening day collection for a Telugu film with over ₹41 crore in 2016 becoming the second-highest Telugu opening of all-time behind Baahubali: The Beginning, at the time and became the highest-grossing Telugu film of 2016, grossing approximately ₹150 crore worldwide.

In 2017, he essayed a triple role in Jai Lava Kusa, directed by K. S. Ravindra and produced by Nandamuri Kalyan Ram, under the N.T.R. Arts banner. The film was a commercial success, collecting over ₹150–175 crore worldwide, and his performance in the triple roles received critical acclaim. It was later screened in Bucheon International Fantastic Film Festival in Category of "Best of Asia" in South Korea. In 2018, he starred in Trivikram Srinivas's action drama Aravinda Sametha Veera Raghava. The film opened to widespread critical acclaim, with particular praise directed at Rama Rao Jr's performance and his seamless command of the Rayalaseema dialect. It opened with a worldwide gross of ₹60 crore on its first day and went on to become one of the highest-grossing Telugu films of the year, grossing over ₹190 crore globally. Director Trivikram Srinivas credited Rama Rao Jr for the film's success, stating:

"A highly capable actor like NTR is very rare to find in any generation. When it comes to acting, he is like a torchbearer. Staying in the moment is a very great quality... NTR has the capability to match his grandfather. He is disciplined, honest, straight-forward, doesn't get involved in unnecessary issues and goes to any extent to achieve what is necessary. We needn't have to stop such a personality, just need to offer claps during his journey."

=== 2022–present: RRR and global recognition ===
In 2022, Rama Rao Jr. starred in S. S. Rajamouli’s magnum opus, RRR, portraying the 20th-century Indian revolutionary Komaram Bheem. At the time of its release, the film was the most expensive Indian production ever made. It marked his fourth collaboration with Rajamouli and served as Rao’s return to the screen after three years, primarily due to production setbacks caused by the COVID-19 pandemic. The film became a global phenomenon and one of the highest-grossing Indian films in history. It registered the biggest opening day for an Indian film at the time, earning ₹223 crore worldwide. RRR earned several national and international accolades, including the first Academy Award for an Indian film, a Golden Globe, and a Critics' Choice Award. Rao’s performance earned him pan-India fame and international recognition, including a nomination for Best Actor in an Action Movie at the Critics' Choice Super Awards. In 2023, he made history by becoming the first Indian actor to be featured on an Oscars Best Actor predictions list. That same year, the Academy of Motion Picture Arts and Sciences included Rama Rao Jr. in its new member class of actors, inviting him to join the prestigious body that oversees the Oscars.

He later reunited with director Koratala Siva for a two-part period action series. The first instalment, Devara: Part 1, was released in 2024. While the film opened to mixed reviews, critics widely praised Rao's performance in the titular role. It was a major commercial success, grossing over ₹150 crore on its opening day and eventually surpassing ₹500 crore worldwide. In 2025, he made his Bollywood debut in YRF Spy Universe's War 2, directed by Ayan Mukerji and co-starring Hrithik Roshan. Although his performance was well received, the film earned mixed to negative reviews from both critics and audiences and underperformed at the box office.

=== Upcoming projects ===
Rama Rao Jr. will work with director Prashanth Neel in their maiden collaboration. He will also collaborate with director Nelson for an untitled project produced by Sithara Entertainments. Rao will also reunite with Koratala Siva for the sequel, to Devara: Part 1 titled Devara: Part 2.

=== Television ===
N. T. Rama Rao Jr. hosted the reality show, Bigg Boss 1 that was broadcast on the Star Maa. Rao's television debut was a huge success and had a record breaking ratings for Star Maa, making it the number one channel among all the shows. Hindustan Times (22 April 2016). Retrieved 10 December 2018.The show began airing from 15 July 2017. He has also been as a guest in Telugu reality game show Meelo Evaru Koteeswarudu and Telugu reality dance shows Dhee 2 and Dhee 10. In February 2021, he was confirmed to be the host of Evaru Meelo Koteeswarulu. Later, on 10 July 2021, he joined the production of the show.

== Personal life ==
N. T. Rama Rao Jr. married Lakshmi Pranathi, the daughter of realtor and businessman Narne Srinivasa Rao. Srinivasa Rao's wife is the niece of N. Chandrababu Naidu, who mediated the marriage. Their wedding took place on 5 May 2011 in Hyderabad at Hitex Exhibition Center, Madhapur. The couple have two sons.

Apart from Telugu, he is a polyglot speaking Kannada, Tamil, Hindi, Marathi and English. He also knows a little Japanese.

== In the media ==
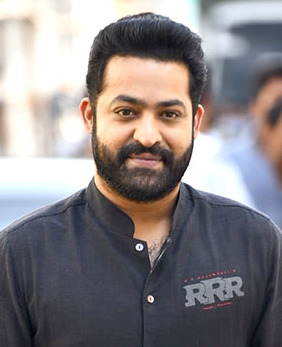
Rao in 2022

N. T. Rama Rao Jr. is popularly referred to as Young Tiger and later Man of Masses in Telugu cinema and media. Due to his popularity, Rao became the sixth most searched South Indian actor on Google, in 2022. He became the fourth most tweeted-about South Indian actor in 2020. In 2021, he became the fifth most tweeted-about actor on the same list. Rao stood at the 14th place on Forbes India's most influential stars on Instagram in South cinema for the year 2021.

A research study conducted in 2023 by Indian Institute of Human Brands (IIHB) stated that Rao was the second "most respected" in Telugu cinema. In the Hyderabad Times Most Desirable Men list, he was placed 12th in 2013, 2nd in 2015, 5th in 2016, 9th in 2017, 19th in 2019 and 3rd in 2020.

=== Political stint and accident ===
N. T. Rama Rao Jr. was one of the campaigners for the Telugu Desam Party, for the 2009 Indian general election from April to May 2009 in Andhra Pradesh. On 26 March 2009, after electioneering, en route to Hyderabad, the SUV in which he was a passenger, was struck head-on with another vehicle, at Suryapet. He and his companions were thrown out of the SUV and suffered injuries. He was treated at Krishna Institute of Medical Sciences, in Secunderabad, where he recuperated well.

== Philanthropy ==
In 2009, N. T. Rama Rao Jr. donated ₹20 lakhs to the Chief Minister's Relief Fund to aid flood victims in Andhra Pradesh. During the audio function of Baadshah in 2013, a fan died due to a stampede and NTR extended his support by donating ₹5 Lakhs to the family of the deceased. Additionally, he pledged to take care of the family following the sudden loss.

In 2014, he announced a donation of ₹20 lakhs to the Chief Minister's Relief Fund to support those affected by Cyclone Hudhud in Andhra Pradesh.

== Discography ==
=== Playback singing ===
| Year | Song | Album | Composer | Language | Notes | Ref(s) |
|---|---|---|---|---|---|---|
| 2007 | "Olammi Thikka Regindha" | Yamadonga | M. M. Keeravani | Telugu | | |
| 2008 | "1,2,3 Nenoka Kantri" | Kantri | Mani Sharma | Telugu | | |
| 2010 | "Chari" | Adhurs | Devi Sri Prasad | Telugu | | |
| 2014 | "Raakasi Raakasi" | Rabhasa | Thaman S | Telugu | | |
| 2016 | "Follow Follow" | Nannaku Prematho | Devi Sri Prasad | Telugu | Mirchi Music Awards – Star as a Singing Sensation (Telugu); Nominated – Filmfare Award for Best Male Playback Singer – Telugu | |
| 2016 | "Geleya Geleya" | Chakravyuha | Thaman S | Kannada | Mirchi Music Awards – Star as a Singing Sensation (Kannada) | |

== See also ==
- List of dancers
