= Simhadri (2003 film) =

2003 film by S. S. Rajamouli

- Film poster
- Directed by: S. S. Rajamouli
- Written by: Dialogues: Viswanath; M. Rathnam
- Screenplay by: S. S. Rajamouli
- Story by: V. Vijayendra Prasad
- Produced by: V. Vijay Kumar Varma; V. Doraswamy Raju (presenter)
- Starring: N. T. Rama Rao Jr. Bhumika Chawla; Ankitha; Mukesh Rishi
- Cinematography: K. Ravindra Babu
- Edited by: Kotagiri Venkateswara Rao
- Music by: M. M. Keeravani
- Production company: VMC Productions
- Release date: 11 July 2003 (India)
- Running time: 175 minutes
- Country: India
- Language: Telugu
- Budget: ₹8 crore
- Box office: est. ₹26 crore distributors' share

Simhadri is a 2003 Indian Telugu-language action comedy drama film co-written and directed by S. S. Rajamouli from a story written by V. Vijayendra Prasad. The film was produced by V. Vijay Kumar Varma under VMC Productions and stars N. T. Rama Rao Jr. as the title character alongside Bhumika Chawla, Ankitha, Mukesh Rishi, Nassar, and Rahul Dev playing supporting roles. The film follows Simhadri, an orphan raised as a son by a noble landlord. He secretly protects Indu, landlord's estranged and amnesiac granddaughter, until a series of events reveals his true identity as "Singamalai," a vigilante revered in Kerala.

Principal photography initially commenced under a different director and was shot for nearly 40 days. However, the producers felt the footage did not align with Rama Rao Jr.'s image following his previous blockbuster, Aadi. Dissatisfied, the makers decided to change the director. Rama Rao Jr. subsequently suggested S. S. Rajamouli, with whom he had previously collaborated on Student no.1, to take over the project, an opportunity that gave a career defining breakthrough for Rajamouli. The film has music composed by M. M. Keeravani while the cinematography and editing are done by Ravindra Babu and Kotagiri Venkateswara Rao respectively.

Released on 9 July 2003, Simhadri received critical acclaim and was widely praised for its story, cast performances, direction, and its high-octane emotional sequences. Along with the success of Aadi, the film cemented Rama Rao Jr.'s status as a major star in Telugu cinema. It went to become a major commercial success, celebrating a 50-day run in 190 centres and a 100-day run in 150 centres, an all-time record in Telugu cinema at the time. It emerged as the highest-grossing Telugu film in history at the time. Produced on a budget of ₹8 crore (US$850,000), it collected a distributor's share over ₹26 crore (US$2.8 million) and a gross of over ₹47 crore at the box-office. (Note: The average exchange rate in 2003 was 46.58 Indian rupees (₹) per 1 US dollar (US$).)

The film was remade in two other languages: as Gajendra (2004) in Tamil, and as Kanteerava (2012) in Kannada.

== Plot ==
Simhadri, an orphan, is raised by the wealthy and benevolent patriarch Ram Bhupal Varma in Visakhapatnam. The two share a profound father-son bond, and Simhadri grows into a deeply loyal and obedient young man. Kasturi, Varma's granddaughter, develops romantic feelings for Simhadri. Unbeknownst to the family, Simhadri routinely visits and financially supports Indu, a mentally challenged girl living under caretaker supervision. When Varma discovers Kasturi's affection for Simhadri, he enthusiastically arranges their marriage. However, on the wedding day, Simhadri's connection to Indu is publicly exposed. Mistaking Indu for his mistress, the family demands he abandon her; when Simhadri firmly refuses, the wedding is called off.

Shortly after, two distinct factions track Simhadri down to the banks of the Godavari River, where he is with Indu. When one group launches a violent assault, Varma and his family, who happen to be present, are stunned to witness Simhadri's fierce and brutal combat skills. Simhadri is rescued by the second faction, led by a man named Namboothri, who reverently addresses him as "Singhamalai Anna." Amidst the chaos of the confrontation, Indu sustains a head injury that cures her amnesia. Upon regaining her memories, she abruptly stabs Simhadri with an iron pole in an act of vengeance, leaving him hospitalized in critical condition. While Simhadri fights for his life, Namboothri explains his past to Varma's bewildered family.

Years prior, Varma's eldest daughter, Saraswati, had alienated her family by eloping with her lover, Aravind, and settling in Thiruvananthapuram, Kerala. Desiring to heal the decades-long family rift, an adult Simhadri traveled to Kerala under the guise of a patient seeking treatment at Saraswati and Aravind's traditional medical spa. He successfully endeared himself to the couple and their daughter—who is revealed to be Indu—and ultimately convinced them to return to Visakhapatnam to reconcile with Varma. However, before they could depart, Saraswati witnessed a homicide committed by Bala Nair, a ruthless local underworld enforcer, who subsequently murdered her to silence her.

An enraged Simhadri retaliated by killing Bala Nair and dismantling his immediate gang. This act of vigilante justice earned him the adoration of the local working-class citizens, who hailed him as a savior and christened him "Singhamalai." As Simhadri embraced this protector persona, he launched a larger campaign to systematically eradicate the sprawling illicit operations of Bhai Saab, the syndicate leader controlling the regional mafia. Distraught by her mother's death and constantly terrified by Simhadri's increasingly perilous life, Indu convinced Aravind that they should return to Andhra Pradesh immediately.

As Aravind and Indu rushed to the railway station to board a train to Visakhapatnam, Simhadri discovered that Bhai Saab's men had covertly planted a bomb inside Aravind's briefcase to destroy the train. Spotting Aravind running along the platform to catch the moving train as Indu reached out to help him, Simhadri realized he was out of shouting range. Recalling Varma's moral philosophy that sacrificing a few lives is justified if it saves the masses, Simhadri made the agonizing choice to shoot Aravind to prevent him from boarding and detonating the train. Witnessing Simhadri shoot her father, a traumatized Indu leaped from the moving train, striking her head against a platform pole—an accident that induced her severe psychological trauma and amnesia.

In the present day, Simhadri successfully survives the stabbing, and a remorseful Indu, now understanding the full truth behind her father's death, begs for his forgiveness. Varma and his family joyfully reunite with Simhadri, deeply moved by his absolute sacrifices for them. Seizing the opportunity while Simhadri is weakened, Bhai Saab and his remaining mercenaries launch a coordinated raid on the hospital to execute him. However, with the unified assistance of his family, supportive local police officers, and his loyal allies from Kerala, Simhadri rallies, single-handedly neutralizes the henchmen, and kills Bhai Saab, permanently securing peace for his family.

== Cast ==
- N.T. Rama Rao Jr. as Simhadri/Singamalai
- Mukesh Rishi as Bhai Saab
- Rahul Dev as Bala Nair
- Bhumika Chawla as Indira "Indu", Saraswathi's daughter and Ram Bhupal Varma's granddaughter
- Sharat Saxena as ACP Namboothri, Simhadri's mentor
- Bhanu Chander as Aravind, Saraswathi's husband and Indu's father
- Seetha as Saraswathi, Aravind's wife, Indu's mother, and sister to Simhadri
- Nassar as Ram Bhupal Varma
- Ankitha as Kasturi
- Brahmanandam as Talupulu
- S. S. Kanchi as Ambujam
- Sangeeta as Varma's wife
- Rallapalli as Indu's caretaker
- Sekhar as Bala's aide
- Ragini as Indu's caretaker
- Venu Madhav as Iyer, a slacker who fakes himself as a disabled man
- Ajay
- Kota Srinivasa Rao as Pingalam, who is jealous of Simhadri for his status
- Chalapathi Rao as a minister on Bhai Saab's side
- Sivannarayana Naripeddi
- Srinivasa Reddy as Thief
- Surya as Ram Bhupal Varma's second son-in-law
- Hema as Ram Bhupal Varma's second son-in-law's wife
- Ravi Babu as a man who misbehaves with Ram Bhupal Varma and later gets thrashed by Simhadri
- G. V. Sudhakar Naidu as Bhai Saab's aide
- Sameer as Doctor
- Chatrapathi Sekhar as Bala Nair's henchman
- Master Mahendra as Blind Shoeshiner
- Rajan P. Dev as The Kerala Chief Minister (cameo appearance)
- Ramya Krishnan as Item number in the song "Chinnadamme Cheekulu"

== Production ==
The film was initially planned to be made with B. Gopal as director and Balakrishna, which was dropped. N.T.Rama Rao Jr. was then cast to lead the film. Principal photography initially commenced under a different director and was shot for nearly 40 days. However, the Doraswamy Raju felt the footage did not align with Rama Rao Jr.'s image following his previous blockbuster, Aadi. Dissatisfied, the Doraswamy Raju decided to change the director. Rama Rao Jr. subsequently suggested S. S. Rajamouli, with whom he had previously collaborated on Student no.1, to take over the project.

Rajamouli was supposed to direct a fantasy film with Kovelamudi Surya Prakash after Student No: 1. However the project was shelved due to high budget and Surya Prakash’s debut film Neetho (2002), bombing at the box office. Writer V. Vijayendra Prasad stated that he got the idea for the story while re-watching Moondram Pirai (1982).

== Music ==
Simhadri

Soundtrack album by M. M. Keeravani
- Released: 9 July 2003
- Recorded: 2003
- Genre: Feature film soundtrack
- Length: 33:16
- Label: Aditya Music
- Producer: M. M. Keeravani

M. M. Keeravani chronology
Saaya (2003)	Simhadri (2003)	Seetayya (2003)

Soundtrack was composed by M. M. Keeravani. He revealed that Rajamouli mostly selected tunes which are already used or those rejected by other directors. The song "Ammaina Nannaina" was originally used for the film Kishkindha Kanda (1994) and the song "Chinnadamme" for the film Samarpana (1992). "Singhamalai" was used for the film People's Encounter (1991). Keeravani acknowledged that the tune of "Chiraaku Anuko" was inspired by Cotton Eye Joe.

Track-List
No.	Title	Lyrics	Singer(s)	Length
1.	"Singamalai"	Veturi	Kalyan Malik	4:34
2.	"Cheema Cheema"	Veturi	S. P. Charan, Ganga, Brahmanandam	4:31
3.	"Ammaina Naannaina"	Sirivennela Seetharama Sastry	Kalyani Malik	5:10
4.	"Chiraaku Anuko"	Chandrabose	S. P. Charan, K. S. Chithra	4:21
5.	"Nannedo Seyamaku"	Chandrabose	M. M. Keeravani, Sunitha Upadrashta	5:02
6.	"Chinnadamme Cheekulu"	Vennelakanti	Mano, Shreya Ghoshal	5:03
7.	"Nuvvu Whistlesthe"	Chandrabose	Tippu, K. S. Chithra	4:35
Total length:				33:16

== Release ==
=== Distribution ===
Simhadri distribution rights were sold for ₹11.5 crore. It was made with a budget of ₹6–11.5 crore of production cost.

=== Re-release ===
Almost 2 decades after its original release date, it was released in 4K and IMAX formats on May 20, 2023, commemorating its 20th anniversary. Simhadri collected 5.14 crores gross on day 1 worldwide with its re-release. This is the second highest day 1 collection for any re-released film so far. The film had run 1012 shows across the world on Tarak's birthday.

== Reception ==
=== Box office ===
Simhadri became the third highest-grossing Telugu film in history at the time. The film was a massive commercial success, celebrating a 50-day run in 190 centres and a 100-day run in 150 centres, an all-time record in Telugu cinema at the time. Produced on a budget of ₹8.5 crore (US$1.8 million) grossed over approximately ₹45-50 crore in its entire run. Simhadri had a theatrical run of over 100 days.

=== Critical response ===
Jeevi of Idlebrain gave a positive review for the film, citing that the story is "pretty strong" and praised N. T. Rama Rao Jr.'s performance stating that the "character offered him the chance to use all his histrionic capability to impress the crowds and he utilized every frame of it to make a deep impact on the hearts of the viewers".

== Remakes ==
After the success, the film was subsequently remade in Tamil as Gajendra (2004) with Vijayakanth by Suresh Krissna. The film was also remade in Kannada as Kanteerava (2012) with Duniya Vijay.

== Awards ==
CineMAA Awards 2003

- Best Actor – N. T. Rama Rao Jr.
