= Rabhasa =

2014 film by Santhosh Srinivas

- Film poster
- Directed by: Santosh Srinivas
- Written by: Santosh Srinivas
- Produced by: Bellamkonda Suresh; Bellamkonda Ganesh Babu
- Starring: N. T. Rama Rao Jr. Samantha; Pranitha Subhash; Brahmanandam Prakash Raj
- Cinematography: Shyam K. Naidu
- Edited by: Kotagiri Venkateswara Rao
- Music by: S. Thaman
- Production companies: Sri Lakshmi Narasimha Productions; Sri Sai Ganesh Productions
- Release date: 29 August 2014
- Running time: 153 minutes
- Country: India
- Language: Telugu
- Budget: ₹45 crore
- Box office: ₹27.75 crores distributors' share

Rabhasa (transl. Chaos) is a 2014 Indian Telugu-language action comedy film written and directed by Santosh Srinivas. It was produced by Bellamkonda Suresh and Bellamkonda Ganesh Babu for Sri Lakshmi Narasimha Productions and stars Jr NTR, Samantha, Pranitha Subhash and Brahmanandam while Nassar, Jayasudha, Raghu Babu and Sayaji Shinde play supporting roles. S. Thaman composed the music for the film. While Shyam K. Naidu handled the cinematography; Kotagiri Venkateswara Rao provided the editing and the Art Director by A. S. Prakash for the film.

The story revolves around US return student Karthik, who pledges to marry his uncle Dhanunjay's daughter Indu, which was his mother's wish. A small family feud ends with both the families getting separated. He joins Indu's college to convince her to marry him but mistakenly assumes Bhagyam is Dhanunjay's daughter. Later, Karthik realizes that Indu is his cousin, but she is already in love with another man. He gets entangled in a risky situation when he tries to help a stranger. The rest of the story is all about how he controls the damage and fulfills the wish of his mother.

The film was launched on 13 February 2013 in Hyderabad. The principal photography started on 2 August 2013 at Banjara Hills in Hyderabad. The majority of the film was shot in Annapoorna Studios, Ramanaidu Studios, Ramoji Film City, and the outskirts and suburbs of Hyderabad, while substantial parts of the film were shot in Jaipur and Pollachi. After shooting a song in Switzerland, the film's shooting came to an end on 23 July 2014 in Hyderabad. Director V. V. Vinayak provided voice-overs for a few sequences in the film.

The film released in theaters worldwide on 29 August 2014, the eve of Vinayaka Chathurthi, to mixed reviews from critics, with most of them labelling it as a regular mass film. The film was a commercial failure.

== Plot ==
Karthik returns to India after completing his graduation in the United States, and his mother decides to have him marry her brother Dhanunjay's daughter Indu. When Karthik's father goes to Dhanunjay's house to ask the same, he gets insulted. Dhanunjay plans to be a mayor and Karthik decides to teach him a lesson and marry his daughter. Firstly, he kills the possibilities of Dhanunjay becoming a mayor. Later he joins Indu's college to somehow convince her for the marriage, where he encounters Bhagyam who falls in love with him whom he misunderstood as Dhanunjay's daughter. Conflicts arise between Karthik and Indu. By the time he learns that Indu is his cousin and not Bhagyam, he has broken up with Bhagyam because of Indu & Upendra’s revenge.

Karthik ends up challenging Dhanunjay & Yeddula, who then approaches a gangster with Raghava & Obul Reddy. Indu acts as if she loves Karthik & Shrinivas so that she can escape from there and find her lover whom she never saw. That person helped her friend elope with her lover on the night of her marriage and neither Indu nor that person knows each other's features and looks. On seeing Karthik's photograph, Obul Reddy asks his whereabouts as he was that person who helped his brother's fiancée who actually was Indu's friend who eloped with her lover that night. Meanwhile, Karthik and Indu escape from there and on learning her love story, Karthik decides to help her and gives up his word given to his mother. Meanwhile, Karthik saves Peddi Reddy from Gangi Reddy's men and Indu poses as Karthik's lover who eloped with him as her parents did not approve their marriage and also a gangster is looking for them. As an act of gratitude, Peddi Reddy takes them to their house where they are kept in safe custody. But shockingly they find out that Obul Reddy is Peddi Reddy's son and Indu's friend actually was Gangi Reddy's daughter.

The person who helped Gangi Reddy's daughter that night from her marriage was Karthik himself and he is unaware that the person who spoke to him in a phone to help that girl was Indu. Indu is unaware that Karthik, & Raghava was that person whom she loves. Dhanunjay uses this situation and introduces Nandu as that person who actually is the son of a rich millionaire with whom Indu's marriage was planned by him. Obul Reddy and his brothers bring a liar named Raju and misrepresent him as the person who helped the bride run away that night. But he is not killed instantly as the bridegroom, Obul Reddy's brother Bulli Reddy who is in a coma due to Karthik, has to kill him once he recuperates. He is cheated on several occasions by Karthik, who meanwhile manages to create a good impression in Indu when he unites Gangi Reddy and Peddi Reddy, thus rescheduling the marriages, and saves Nandu from Peddi Reddy when he broke the house's ancestral statue by taking the blame himself. Indu proposes Karthik to marry her and declares that she cannot live without him.

But he is not in a position to accept her proposal as Dhanunjay warned him before that if he makes Indu fall in love, he would reveal that Karthik helped Gangi Reddy's daughter to escape thus breaking the newly formed bond between the two families. Thus he rejects her proposal and sacrifices his love for the welfare of the two families. After an unexpected fight with Obul Reddy, Karthik is confronted by Peddi Reddy and Gangi Reddy, who now know the truth. They forgive him and the marriage of Peddi Reddy's daughter happens as scheduled, with Karthik and Indu getting married in the presence of their parents on the same day at the same venue. The families of Gangi Reddy and Peddi Reddy are united and all are happy.

== Cast ==
- Jr NTR as Karthik, Dhanunjay’s sister's son, Indu's love interest
- Samantha as Indu, Dhanunjay’s Daughter, Karthik’s Cousin (Voice dubbed by Chinmayi).
- Pranitha Subhash as Bhagyam
- Brahmanandam as Raju
- Rao Ramesh As Raghava, Karthik’s father
- Jayasudha as Karthik's mother
- Sameer Hasan As Karthik’s uncle & Indu’s relative
- Nassar as Ramachandrayya, Karthik's father
- Sayaji Shinde as Dhanunjay, Indu’s Father
- Posani Krishna Murali As Police Officer
- Jaya Prakash Reddy as Peddi Reddy "Pedayya" & Raghava’s father in law
- Nagineedu as Gangi Reddy
- Ali as Karthik's friend, a fake CBI officer
- Bramhaji as Damodar
- Srinivasa Reddy as Prithviraj, Dhanunjay’s brother
- Ajay as Obul Reddy
- Raghu Babu as Dhanunjay's henchman
- Raghu Karumanchi as Dhanunjay's henchman
- Ravi Prakash as Obul Reddy's brother
- Amit Tiwari as Obul Reddy's brother
- Prabhakar as Ganeshan, Dhanunjay's henchman
- Bharath Raju as Diwakar
- Sravan as Bulli Reddy
- Vamsi Krishna as Palli Babu
- Nandu as Vamsi,
- Hema as Indu's aunt
- Seetha as Peddi Reddy's wife
- Pragathi as Gangi Reddy's wife
- Surekha Vani as Obul Reddy's wife
- Tanikella Bharani as Lawyer, Raghava’s uncle
- Praveen as Karthik's friend
- Madhunandan as Karthik's friend
- Satya as Karthik's friend
- Prudhvi Raj as College Principal

== Production ==
=== Development ===
After the film Kandireega became a critical and commercial success at the box office, it prompted the makers to make a sequel. Thus they wanted to sign the protagonist of Kandireega, Ram and actress Shruti Haasan to play the lead roles in the sequel during the pre-release time of Ram's Endukante... Premanta!. However, reports emerged that N. T. Rama Rao Jr. would replace Ram in Kandireega 2. Later the makers officially confirmed that the film was shelved and they decided to make a film with N. T. Rama Rao Jr. in the direction of Santosh Srinivas and Samantha Ruth Prabhu was selected as the heroine, who too signed a three-film-deal contract with Suresh with Jabardasth being the first one and this film being the second. The film was titled Rabhasa and it was said that it was a film in city backdrop and is not the sequel to Kandireega. The film was launched at Hyderabad on 13 February 2013. N. T. Rama Rao Jr., Santosh Srinivas, Bellamkonda Suresh, Bellamkonda Ganesh Babu and others attended the film's launch. Later in September 2013, it was reported that the film's title had been changed as the makers felt that the title Rabhasa didn't suit the film's story. It was also reported that the film was titled as Joru.

However, in December 2013, Bellamkonda Suresh confirmed that Rabhasa was the working title of the film and added that he would announce the official title later. At the end of January 2014, it was reported that Koratala Siva was directing a part of the film since Santosh Srinivas was suffering from jaundice. The announcement of Koratala Siva and N. T. Rama Rao Jr.'s film in early November 2013 added fuel to the rumors. However, in early February 2014, Koratala Siva clarified to the media that he was not directing Rabhasa, was not a part of the film in any way, and was busy with other projects. At the end of April 2014, it was said that the selection of title might take some time as the makers had a strong belief in numerology, making it an important basis for the title selection. However, in early May 2014, the title Rabhasa was registered by the producers. Santosh Srinivas later revealed that he had received a few suggestions from N. T. Rama Rao Jr. for improvements to the script. In late August 2014, Telugu director V. V. Vinayak provided voice-overs for a few sequences in the film.

=== Casting ===
N. T. Rama Rao Jr. was signed on to play the main protagonist. It was stated that he would play a role of 4 shades, one of them being a playboy and another being a responsible family member. To complement the role, it was reported that N. T. Rama Rao Jr. would undergo a style makeover with a different hairdo as one of them. It was stated that Santosh wanted to change the hairdo of N. T. Rama Rao Jr. to make it one of the differentiating factors in the film. Samantha Ruth Prabhu was selected as the heroine of the film, marking her third collaboration with N. T. Rama Rao Jr. after Brindavanam and Ramayya Vasthavayya. It was reported that she would sport a bikini in the film, to which she responded that it was just a rumor but she added that she didn't mind being glamorous.

It was reported that prominent Tamil actress Nazriya Nazim was recruited to play one of the main characters, thus marking her Telugu debut. However, it was reported that Nazriya Nazim backed out of the film due to creative differences with the producers. Sources added that Nazriya was not comfortable to participate in a shoot of intimate scenes and the director's decision not to remove those scenes from the film made her walk out from the film. When questioned, Nazriya responded that they all were rumors and she wasn't approached by any producer for a Telugu film. Pranitha Subhash, who rose to fame with Trivikram Srinivas's directorial Attarintiki Daredi, was signed in as the other heroine of the film. Coincidentally, both of them were the lead actresses in Attarintiki Daredi.

Santosh added that she would portray the role of a typical Andhrite girl and that her role was a vital one in the film. However, it was also said that there would be no combination scenes of Pranitha Subhash and Samantha Ruth Prabhu in the film. Sources added that Pranitha Subhash would appear in the second half possibly while Samantha Ruth Prabhu would appear in the first half of the film. But in early February 2014, the above news was reported to be false. As per production sources, it was said that N. T. Rama Rao Jr. would have a romantic track with both the heroines in the film and the second half would have some nice scenes between the three actors; they added that Samantha Ruth Prabhu and Pranitha Subhash would be fighting with each other for the hero in this film.

Since early March 2014, it was reported that Malayalam actor Mohanlal would have a prominent cameo in the film, marking his return to Telugu cinema after a cameo appearance in Gandeevam, which had released in 1994. However, when contacted, the source close to the development said, "The news is fake and Mohanlal is not doing any role in Rabhasa". At the end of April 2014, Brahmaji said in an interview to a leading daily that he was playing a negative character in the film. In early May, it was confirmed that the film was going to feature N. T. Rama Rao Jr. in two very different ways and one of them would be a hilarious one. In mid-June 2014, it was reported that N. T. Rama Rao Jr. had choreographed the introduction song in the film. The same was confirmed by Santosh Srinivas in mid-July 2014.

=== Filming ===
The principal photography started on 2 August 2013 at Banjara Hills in Hyderabad. Later some action sequences were shot near Tellapur, which is located in the outskirts of Hyderabad. With this, the first schedule of the film's shoot was wrapped up. After the completion of the schedule of Ramayya Vasthavayya, N. T. Rama Rao Jr. joined the sets of the film and the shooting commenced in Ramoji Film City, where some action scenes were shot in a house set erected in Ramoji Film City. After the completion of the action sequence, a song was shot with the leads there. Then the unit proceeded to Pollachi in Tamil Nadu for a couple of weeks schedule shoot. The shooting continued in November 2013 at Ramoji Film City where a fight sequence between N. T. Rama Rao Jr. and Sayaji Shinde's gang was shot. After a brief gap due to ill health, Samantha Ruth Prabhu joined the sets of the film in early December and some vital scenes on N. T. Rama Rao Jr. and Samantha Ruth Prabhu were shot at Hyderabad in that schedule. After wrapping up the schedule there in first week of December, the unit proceeded to Jaipur for a month-long schedule. Later in the second week of December 2013, after shooting some important scenes at Ramoji Film City, the shooting continued at the Gandharva Mahal set in Hyderabad, where scenes on N. T. Rama Rao Jr., Brahmanandam and Samantha Ruth Prabhu were shot. Later on in early January 2014, the shooting continued at Manikonda in Hyderabad, where a huge set was erected for this purpose.

After taking a break on account of Sankranti, the new schedule started at Gandharva Mahal set at Manikonda from 18 January 2014 where a family song was shot in which the leads participated. The introduction song of the hero was shot with N. T. Rama Rao Jr. and few dancers at Pollachi in the end of January 2014. In early February 2014, romantic tracks on the leads were shot at Pollachi. In mid-February 2014, it was reported that a song on the leads would be shot at Annapurna Studios and Ramoji Film City using the choreography of Raju Sundaram. The song shoot was completed on 18 February 2014. A song was shot on N. T. Rama Rao Jr. and Samantha Ruth Prabhu at Ramanaidu Studios from 26 February 2014. It was announced that 4 of 5 songs had been shot completely and that Santosh Srinivas would continue directing the talkie part after the remaining song's shoot, as he had been suffering from jaundice for the previous few months. When the song shoot continued in Hyderabad, the shooting was disrupted due to unexpected rains. On 5 March 2014, a press note was released which stated that the film's foreign schedule would start on 16 March and that schedule, along with the last song's shoot, would continue for 40 days which would end the film's principal photography. Due to unknown reasons, the final schedule started on 10 April at the Aluminium Factory in Gachibowli at Hyderabad. There the introduction fight sequence of the hero was shot using the choreography of Ram-Lakshman and FEFSI Vijayan.

The schedule continued till 10 May and Samantha Ruth Prabhu, Pranitha Subhash and others partook in the shoot. It was said that by the end of the schedule, 80% of the film's talkie and songs would be completed. In a week's time, some family scenes were shot in Hyderabad along with the introduction fights. Later, crucial scenes on N. T. Rama Rao Jr. and Samantha Ruth Prabhu were shot at Gandharva Mahal set near Manikonda in the third week of April. In the first week of May, the climax sequences were shot in and near Hyderabad. On 11 May, Samantha Ruth Prabhu rejoined the shoot of the film. At Ramoji Film City, a song was shot on N. T. Rama Rao Jr. and Samantha Ruth Prabhu for a couple of days under extreme heat which was tweeted by the latter in her micro blogging page at Twitter. After a break due to shoot of Kaththi, Samantha Ruth Prabhu rejoined the sets of the film on 1 June 2014. By the second week of July 2014, the complete shooting was wrapped up except for a song and some patch work scenes. Some comic scenes were shot on N. T. Rama Rao Jr. and few other comedians at a five-star hotel in Hyderabad. For the shoot of the last song, the film's unit traveled to Italy for the last schedule. Because of Visa issues, the team chose Switzerland to shoot the last song and the shoot started on 16 July 2014. The film's team returned from Switzerland on 22 July 2014 and the final shot featuring all the actors and actresses was shot at Ramoji Film City Hyderabad on 23 July 2014 thus wrapping up the entire principal photography.

== Soundtrack ==
S. Thaman was signed as the music director of the film since Santosh Srinivas and Anoop Rubens failed to be on the same page. In mid-February 2014, reports emerged that N. T. Rama Rao Jr. would sing a song in this film thus turning a singer again after singing in his previous films Yamadonga, Kantri and Adhurs. The film's soundtrack was released by hosting a promotional event on 4 August 2014 at Shilpakala Vedika in Hyderabad through Aditya Music label.

== Release ==
Rabhasa has been Pre-sold for ₹45 crore (US$4.7 million) to Distributors but the film collected ₹30 crore (US$3.1 million)(share) in its lifetime. It is rumored that NTR was paid ₹16.5 crore (US$1.7 million) Remuneration for the film In early December 2013, it was reported that the film would release on 28 March 2014. In the end of January 2014, it was reported that the film's release was postponed to 9 May 2014 and it would release on that day in a grand scale. In early May 2014, it was reported that the film would release in July 2014. It was said then that delay in the film's shoot was a reason for the postponement of the release. But on 19 May 2014 a press note was released which stated that the film would release on 14 August 2014. On 29 July 2014 it was confirmed that the film's release has been postponed to 15 August 2014 which is the 68th Independence Day of India. There were reports that the film may be postponed to a future date which was confirmed on 5 August 2014 that the film would release on 29 August 2014 on the eve of Vinayaka Chathurthi. There were many speculations that the film would be postponed but the makers later confirmed that there will be no change in the film's release date. The film was awarded an 'A' certificate without any cuts by Central Board of Film Certification on 20 August 2014. 90 screens were booked in USA for the film's release there which was a less number when compared to N. T. Rama Rao Jr.'s previous films Baadshah (108 screens) and Ramayya Vasthavayya (115 screens).

It was also dubbed in Hindi under the title The Super Khiladi 2 by Goldmines Telefilms.

=== Distribution ===
On 30 June 2014, Classics Entertainments issued a press note that they purchased the entire overseas theatrical screening rights of the film. On 2 July 2014 Errabus issued a press note that they are distributing this film in UK and Europe. Dil Raju bought the Nizam Distribution Rights for ₹12 crores and the Ceded region rights were sold for ₹7.5 crores while Nellore rights fetched ₹1.9 crores. Alankar Prasad acquired the Krishna area rights for an undisclosed high price and the Karnataka Rights of the movie were sold for ₹4.75 crores. The film did a total pre-release business of ₹56 crore (US$5.8 million).

== Reception ==
=== Critical reception ===
Rabhasa received mixed reviews from critics. idlebrain.com gave 3 out of 5 and concluded, "First half of the film is a little disappointing. Second half is better. A few of Brahmanandam's scenes are handled well. Plus points of the film are NTR's performance and a few of Brahmi's episodes in 2nd half. The minus point of the film is lack of freshness and a complicated screenplay. This film is made with mass orientation and the success will depend on how masses take it!".

Karthk Pasupulate of The Times of India wrote, " If you aren't a NTR fan you might just regret leaving home to watch this one.", and rated the movie 2.5 out of 5. APherald.com gave 2 out of 5 and wrote, "If you're Jr NTR fan, then Rabhasa comes with a one watch tag. But if you are looking for something different, it's better to wait for its home edition."

=== Box office ===
Rabhasa recorded a "good" opening all over the South for early shows, which started as early as 4 am. The film collected a share of around ₹9.05 crore (US$940,000) in Andhra Pradesh on its opening day, marking the biggest opening of 2014 and the third biggest opening of all time in the AP/Nizam area (later surpassed by Aagadu).

Rabhasa collected a total share of ₹27.75 crore by the end of its theatrical run and was declared as a disaster as its theatricals were sold for ₹44.5 crore.
