= FNCC Awards =

- Awarded for: Best in films
- Country: India
- Presented by: Cinema of Andhra Pradesh
- First award: 2007
- Website: www.fncc.in

The FNCC Awards is an awards ceremony in Hyderabad, India. Film Nagar Cultural Center presents the Telugu cinema awards. Since then, it has gained substantial popularity as an awards ceremony to the Telugu film industry. Film Nagar Cultural Center presented the Telugu cinema awards 2007 on the night of 31 December for the first time and continuing the same every year. This function was attended by more than 2000 members of film fraternity. The winners were announced using a sealed cover. Suma anchored the event and Chakri conducted a musical night. Nataraj, Abhinaya Sri, Poonam Bajwa, Archana and Gowri Mumjal performed dances. Siva Reddy entertained the crowds with mimicry.

== History ==
The first awards were presented on 16 December 2007, at Hyderabad, India where 2000 people attended.

The second edition of FNCC Telugu film awards were presented on the night of 31 December 2008. D Rama Naidu and MS Reddy were felicitated. Gamyam and Kotha Bangaru Lokam dominated the awards by winning three each.

On the eve of the new year, the first-ever Film Nagar Cultural Club's awards night was held in the city. Many popular and prominent people from the film industry were present to celebrate with the stars. Awards were given away in popular categories, selected by a special panel of judges. Apart from NTR, Ram Charan, Genelia and Shekhar Kammula, Krishnam Raju was present wife. Dil Raju too was seen cheering Shekhar Kammula. FNCC president KS Rama Rao, C Aswini Dutt and Ramanaidu were among those present.

The best actor award was given away by C Aswini Dutt to NTR for films Yamadonga and Raakhi. Genelia was adjudged the best actress for this year's surprise hit Dhee. Dr Ramanaidu gave away the award. G Seshagiri Rao gave the sensational star award to Ram Charan Teja for Chiruta. The best film award went to Happy Days, while the Jury award went to Chandamama.

Awards in other categories included Best dialogues and story writer to Posani Krishna Murali (Operation Duryodhana); best music director to Radha Krishna (Chandamama); best director, producer, screenplay writer to Shekhar Kammula (Happy Days); best cinematographer Ratnavel (Jagadam), to list a few.

A special musical show was put up by music director Chakri. Abhinayasri, Gauri Munjal, Poonam Bajwa performed to popular songs while Siva Reddy had the audience in splits with his mimicry items.

Ram Charan Teja said: "This is the first award in my career. I will ever remember this happy occasion. I would like to share this award with my first director Puri Jagannath." Sekhar Kammula said: "I made Happy Days especially for the students of Andhra Pradesh. We have reached our target by 200 percent. Though the movie is done with all newcomers, the people had blessed us with a big heart and I am thankful to all of them. I am doing to come with another superb movie for you in this year itself."

== Awards ==
- Best Film
- Best Director
- Best Actor
- Best Actress
- Best Supporting Actor
- Best Supporting Actress
- Best Comedian
- Best Music Director
- Best Story
- Best Screenplay
- Best Sensational star
- Best Cinematographer
