= Chief ministership of N. T. Rama Rao =

Government of Andhra Pradesh (1983–1989, 1994–1995)

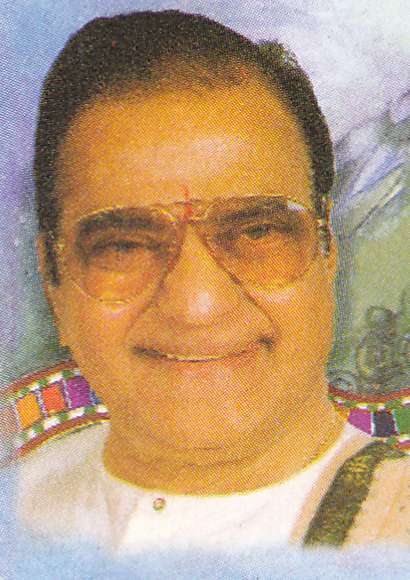
- Rao on an Indian stamp
- Chief ministership of N. T. Rama Rao
- Premier: N. T. Rama Rao
- Party: Telugu Desam Party
- First term 9 January 1983 – 16 August 1984
- Cabinet: First
- Election: 1983
- Appointed by: Governor, K. C. Abraham
- Seat: Gudivada
- Second term 16 September 1984 – 9 March 1985
- Cabinet: Second
- Election: 1984 coup
- Appointed by: Governor, Shankar Dayal Sharma
- Seat: Gudivada
- Third term 9 March 1985 – 2 December 1989
- Cabinet: Third
- Election: 1985
- Appointed by: Governor, Shankar Dayal Sharma
- Seat: Hindupur
- Fourth term 12 December 1994 – 1 September 1995
- Cabinet: Fourth
- Election: 1994
- Appointed by: Governor, Krishan Kant
- Seat: Hindupur

Nandamuri Taraka Rama Rao (also known as N.T.R) served as Chief Minister of United Andhra Pradesh for four terms between 1983 and 1995. He was the first person to hold the office while not a member of the Indian National Congress, representing the Telugu Desam Party (TDP), which he founded in 1982.

In August 1984, during his first term and while undergoing coronary heart surgery in the United States, Rama Rao was removed from office by Thakur Ram Lal, then Governor of Andhra Pradesh, and replaced with his finance minister, Nadendla Bhaskara Rao. Following his return to India, Rama Rao demonstrated majority support among members of the Andhra Pradesh Legislative Assembly and was reinstated as Chief Minister in September 1984.

He was re-elected for a second term in 1985 and completed the full term. In the 1989 assembly elections, his party lost power, and he returned as Chief Minister in 1994 for his third and final term, in alliance with Left parties. In 1995, Nara Chandrababu Naidu, his son-in-law, assumed leadership of the TDP and became Chief Minister. Rama Rao died of a heart attack in 1996.

His policies and priorities during his terms as Chief Minister were the subject of discussion and debate among political analysts and commentators.

== Policy ==
=== Economic policies ===
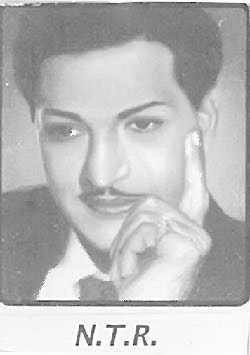
N. T. Rama Rao

Rama Rao's government pursued the divestment of selected non-performing state-owned industries to private entities, with the stated objective of improving their operational efficiency. As part of this policy, Hyderabad Allwyn Limited (Allwyn Motors) was divested and subsequently became part of Mahindra & Mahindra.

During his later tenure, Rama Rao supported policies aimed at reducing government involvement in economic activity and promoting autonomous economic institutions. In this context, his government enacted the Andhra Pradesh Mutually Aided Co-operative Societies Act, 1995 (MACS Act).

The MACS Act established a legal framework for the formation and functioning of mutually aided cooperative societies, emphasizing their autonomy from government control while prescribing regulatory provisions related to governance, accountability, and member equality. The Act defined cooperatives as democratic institutions and outlined rules governing profit distribution and member participation. It also provided for the establishment of a dedicated tribunal mechanism to adjudicate disputes involving such societies.

Elements of the MACS framework were later referenced in cooperative sector reforms beyond Andhra Pradesh, and aspects of its principles were reflected in national policy discussions and international cooperative guidelines, including those issued by the United Nations in 2001.

=== Education Policies ===
N. T. Rama Rao articulated a policy vision that emphasized education as a tool for social development, administrative efficiency, and economic participation. His initiatives were implemented during his tenure as Chief Minister, with administrative support from education officials including Gali Muddu Krishnama Naidu.

Rama Rao viewed education as an instrument for social mobility, particularly for women and socially disadvantaged groups. He supported expanding access to educational opportunities based on merit, with the objective of improving overall societal efficiency. He also emphasized the role of language in education, arguing that instruction in Telugu would benefit students in public administration and local economic participation.

Rama Rao supported the use of Telugu in education and administration, while also acknowledging the importance of multilingual instruction. He advocated the inclusion of English and Hindi as part of primary education to facilitate communication beyond the state. He opposed the growing reliance on private English-medium schooling, stating that public education required strengthening rather than substitution by private institutions.

To address these concerns, he proposed measures that included the use of Telugu and Urdu in government employment and institutional processes, the strengthening of the Telugu Academy to translate academic material into Telugu, and improvements to government schools alongside compulsory instruction in English and Hindi. His views reflected educational models followed in several non-English-speaking countries, where primary instruction is conducted in the mother tongue.

During his tenure, Rama Rao oversaw revisions to the state school curriculum. He introduced statewide standardized entrance examinations for higher education, including engineering and medicine, through the EAMCET (Engineering and Medical Common Entrance Test). Admissions to state colleges were based on merit rankings obtained in these examinations. His government also prohibited capitation fee–based admissions in higher education institutions.

Rama Rao supported lifelong learning and sought to expand educational access for women and working professionals whose studies had been interrupted. He was involved in the establishment of an Open University that offered distance education programmes.

His administration also prohibited government school teachers from operating private tuition centres. This decision led to protests by teachers’ unions. Despite opposition, examinations were conducted as scheduled, with administrative support from Non-Gazetted Officers.

The Andhra Pradesh Residential Education Institutions Society (APREIS), originally established in 1972, was reorganized under Rama Rao's government in 1988 through G.O.Ms.No.363, Education (SSE.I) Department. The reforms expanded the number of institutions and placed them under direct oversight of the Education Ministry, with governance provided by a dedicated board.

The Andhra Pradesh Residential Junior Colleges (APRJC), operating under APREIS, expanded access to intermediate education for rural and disadvantaged students. Alumni from these institutions have gained admission to national-level technical institutes, including the Indian Institutes of Technology and BITS.

Rama Rao also supported the establishment of Sri Padmavati Mahila Visvavidyalayam in Tirupati, a women's university aimed at expanding access to higher education for women in the state.

=== Legislations ===
After assuming office in 1983, Rama Rao's first legislative initiative was the enactment of the Andhra Pradesh Upa Lok Pal (civil society ombudsman) Bill, which drew inspiration from ombudsman systems in Scandinavian countries. The A.P. Lokayukta Act, 1983 (Act 11 of 1983) came into force on 1 November 1983. The Act provided a statutory mechanism through which citizens could initiate complaints against public functionaries, including the Chief Minister, with investigations conducted through legally defined procedures.

Rama Rao's government also enacted amendments to the Hindu Succession Act in Andhra Pradesh to provide women with equal inheritance rights in ancestral property.

The Development of Women and Children in Rural Areas (DWCRA) programme was introduced in 1983 as a centrally sponsored pilot project across 50 districts in India. In Andhra Pradesh, the programme received active administrative and political support during Rama Rao's tenure, with an emphasis on organizing rural women into self-help and income-generating groups. The state's implementation later influenced revisions to the programme at the national level, including the involvement of non-governmental organizations in organizing women into small economic collectives. The programme continued under subsequent administrations, with later policy enhancements such as subsidized credit schemes, and remains part of Andhra Pradesh's rural development framework.

Rama Rao's government enacted prohibition legislation and discontinued state-sponsored manufacture of low-cost alcoholic beverages intended for mass consumption.

His administration reduced the retirement age for state government employees from 58 to 55. During disputes with government employee unions, including a general strike over pay parity demands, the government invoked provisions of the National Security Act. The administration also restructured certain state-run organizations, including the Housing Construction Corporation, citing fiscal considerations. Rama Rao relocated his office outside the state secretariat, citing administrative efficiency concerns.

Rama Rao oversaw the implementation of constitutionally mandated reservations in local bodies for women, Scheduled Castes, and Scheduled Tribes, which had previously seen limited enforcement. His government also passed legislation providing 55% reservations for Backward Classes in professional education, which was subsequently struck down by the High Court, leading to its withdrawal.

His government abolished the Patel–Patwari system, an inheritance-based revenue administration structure that had been prevalent in parts of Telangana.

Rama Rao repealed the Andhra Pradesh Safe Road Transport Act, which had nationalized private bus services, with the stated objective of encouraging private participation in road transport while redefining the state transport corporation's role to focus on underserved rural routes. During his tenure, road transport connectivity was expanded to rural areas. However, his government did not repeal the Urban Land Ceiling Act (1976) or the Agricultural Land Ceiling Act (1975), despite stated intentions to reform them.

Rama Rao's government abolished the Andhra Pradesh Legislative Council. Critics had described the Council as an unproductive expense to the state exchequer and questioned its representative legitimacy, alleging that it was used to accommodate individuals not elected to the legislature.

=== Welfare policies ===
Rama Rao's government introduced a subsidized public distribution scheme under which rice was supplied at a fixed price of ₹2 (2.1¢ US) per kilogram to agricultural labourers earning less than ₹500 (US$5.20) per month.

His administration also implemented a mid-day meal programme for primary school students from households earning below ₹500 (US$5.20) per month. Additional welfare measures included programmes to provide basic household electricity connections to low-income families in rural areas.

In 1983, Rama Rao initiated a state-funded housing programme aimed at replacing kutcha houses with pucca houses for economically weaker sections. The programme targeted the construction of approximately 500,000 houses over five years, at an estimated cost of ₹6,000 (US$62) per unit. The housing programme was continued under subsequent administrations, including that of Chandrababu Naidu, with implementation overseen by Finance Minister Yanamala Rama Krishnudu. Over the following years, additional housing units were constructed under the scheme.

Rama Rao's government also provided subsidized electricity to small and marginal farmers earning less than ₹12,000 (US$120) annually, at a nominal charge of ₹50 (52¢ US) per year.

Additional welfare initiatives included subsidized distribution of clothing to women from households earning below ₹500 (US$5.20) per month. The procurement of clothing for this programme was undertaken through the Andhra Pradesh Co-operative Organisation (APCO), which represents traditional handloom weavers.

=== Irrigation ===
Rama Rao's government initiated major investments in irrigation infrastructure, including the Telugu Ganga Project. The project aimed to augment irrigation in parts of Rayalaseema and supply drinking water to Chennai. The project also received support and assistance from the Indian spiritual leader Sri Sathya Sai Baba.

During this period, Rama Rao sought expert input on long-term water resource planning and invited irrigation engineer Kanuri Lakshmana Rao to contribute to discussions on integrated water management. Despite his advanced age and ill health at the time, Kanuri Lakshmana Rao prepared conceptual frameworks related to inter-basin water transfers and river-linking proposals.

These ideas emphasized the potential redistribution of water from glacier-fed rivers in northern India to rain-fed rivers in peninsular regions. Proposals included linking selected tributaries of the Ganga and Brahmaputra systems with the Godavari and Krishna river basins, as well as downstream linkages along the eastern river systems. Elements of this approach were later reflected in broader national discussions on river interlinking. Rama Rao advocated inter-state cooperation on these concepts, which subsequently featured in national-level policy discourse, including the Indian rivers inter-linking project promoted during the tenure of Prime Minister Atal Bihari Vajpayee.

Within Andhra Pradesh, these discussions informed proposals for phased irrigation development, including link canals between the Godavari, Krishna, and Pennar river systems, aimed at improving water availability in drought-prone regions. The proposals focused primarily on long-term planning and conceptual design rather than immediate large-scale implementation.

Rama Rao's government also introduced reforms in the management of irrigation water distribution from major reservoirs by involving farmer organizations (raitu sangams) in planning and allocation decisions..

=== Developmental projects ===
During N. T. Rama Rao's tenure, the state government initiated the construction and upgradation of airport facilities at Tirupati, Visakhapatnam, Vijayawada, and Warangal. His administration also commissioned feasibility and investment studies for port development at Nellore, Machilipatnam, and Kakinada.

Rama Rao's government invested in the expansion of rural road infrastructure. According to published analyses, approximately 22,000 miles of roads were constructed during this period, contributing significantly to the state's road network.

Improvements in road and air connectivity to Tirupati coincided with the establishment of the National MST Radar Facility (NMRF) near the city. The facility was set up with objectives that included atmospheric research, weather forecasting, and support for space and satellite-related applications, including those associated with Sriharikota. The facility also contributed to meteorological data used in water resource planning and satellite-based educational initiatives.

The National Fertilizers Corporation of India Limited (NFCL) and the Godavari Fertilizers and Chemicals Limited (GFCL) were established during Rama Rao's first and second terms, respectively. Contemporary accounts note administrative support for the rapid operationalisation of these units. During this period, fertilizer consumption in Andhra Pradesh increased significantly relative to the national average. Studies from agricultural research institutions also recorded notable gains in agricultural productivity during this period.

In urban infrastructure, Rama Rao's government constructed the Mahatma Gandhi Bus Station (MGBS) in Hyderabad, which at the time of completion was among the largest bus terminals in Asia. His administration also commissioned a large Buddha statue in Hyderabad, intended to reflect the region's historical association with Buddhism.

The government undertook urban beautification initiatives along Tank Bund in Hyderabad, including the installation of statues depicting notable Telugu personalities. These efforts were part of broader urban development measures that included dredging and cleaning of Hussain Sagar, creation of public recreational spaces, and improvements to surrounding road infrastructure, alongside planned commercial and cultural development in the adjoining areas.

=== Security ===
In 1989, the Government of United Andhra Pradesh established a specialized commando force to address internal security challenges, particularly those related to Naxalism. Contemporary security analyses have cited the force as part of a broader counterinsurgency strategy that combined policing measures with administrative and developmental interventions.

During Rama Rao's tenure, the state administration implemented security and administrative measures during Ganesh Chaturthi processions in Hyderabad. Academic and journalistic accounts note a decline in the scale and frequency of communal disturbances associated with Ganesh immersion during this period, compared with earlier decades.

=== Governance and other initiatives ===
The Visakhapatnam Steel Plant, which had faced delays and operational challenges since its inception, became operational during Rama Rao's tenure as Chief Minister. Contemporary accounts note that the state government engaged with the central government to expedite the project's progress.

During his administration, efforts were made to strengthen tertiary healthcare infrastructure in Hyderabad, including recruitment of medical professionals and expansion of advanced medical facilities. His government also established a medical university in Vijayawada.

Rama Rao introduced administrative reforms in Tirupati, including measures aimed at improving transparency and efficiency in temple administration, such as computerised registration systems and financial oversight mechanisms.

Under his leadership, the Telugu Desam Party (TDP) undertook organisational reforms, including computerisation of party records and the development of a structured grassroots organisation at the village level. Political scientists have noted that these measures contributed to the consolidation of a competitive non-Congress political alternative in Andhra Pradesh.

His government abolished the hereditary munusobu and karanam systems and transferred administrative authority to elected representatives in local self-government institutions. Reforms were also introduced in temple administration, including standardised entrance examinations for Vedic studies and policies allowing non-Brahmins to serve as priests in certain temples.

In 1989, Rama Rao played a key role in the formation of the National Front, a coalition of non-Congress political parties, and served as its founding president. The National Front formed the government at the centre following the 1989 Indian general election. Scholars have described this period as significant in the transition from single-party dominance to coalition politics at the national level.

During this phase, Rama Rao engaged in strategic alliances with leaders from other states and parties, including support extended to P. V. Narasimha Rao in a parliamentary election and cooperation with political leaders from Tamil Nadu in connection with the Telugu Ganga Project. These alliances contributed to Andhra Pradesh's engagement with central policy-making during his tenure.

Rama Rao is also associated with efforts to emphasise a distinct Telugu cultural and political identity for Andhra Pradesh following its separation from the erstwhile Madras State. During his tenure, the Telugu film industry increasingly shifted its base from Chennai to Hyderabad, contributing to the city's growth as a centre for Telugu cinema.

In December 1985, his government issued G.O. 610, which mandated the implementation of local reservation policies in government employment in the Telangana region, following an audit process. Subsequent administrative measures, including G.O. 674, were issued to enforce compliance with these provisions.

Rama Rao introduced the Mandal Praja Parishad (MPP) system as part of a broader decentralisation initiative. Mandals replaced earlier administrative units and became democratically elected local bodies with substantial representation for Scheduled Castes, Scheduled Tribes and Backward Classes. The reform is cited as a significant expansion of local self-governance in the state.

His administration also introduced measures aimed at increasing women's economic security. Regulations required that salary payments of certain categories of government employees be encashed with spousal acknowledgement, and amendments to the Assigned Lands Act mandated that government-assigned land be registered in the name of a woman in the household wherever applicable.

== Coup of 1984 ==
In 1984, N. T. Rama Rao was temporarily removed from office during a political crisis in Andhra Pradesh that followed internal dissent within the ruling Telugu Desam Party (TDP) and intervention by the state Governor.

The crisis began while Rama Rao was in the United States undergoing triple bypass heart surgery. He had assumed office approximately 18 months earlier after leading the TDP to victory in the 1983 Andhra Pradesh Legislative Assembly election, becoming the first non-Congress Chief Minister of the state.

Upon his return to India on 14 August 1984, Rama Rao informed the Governor of Andhra Pradesh, Ram Lal, of what he described as an attempt to replace him as Chief Minister and recommended the removal of his Finance Minister, Nadendla Bhaskara Rao. The Governor initially agreed to this request.

On 15 August 1984, Rama Rao requested that the Governor convene a session of the Legislative Assembly so that he could demonstrate his majority on the floor of the House. This request was declined. On 16 August, the Indian National Congress (R) announced its support for Bhaskara Rao, following which the Governor dismissed Rama Rao's government and appointed Bhaskara Rao as Chief Minister. The decision was justified on the grounds that Rama Rao had lost his legislative majority, a claim that was disputed at the time. Rama Rao subsequently presented 168 legislators out of a total strength of 294 as supporting him. No formal documentation demonstrating a majority for Bhaskara Rao was made public.

Rama Rao attempted to challenge his dismissal and was briefly detained along with a number of legislators who supported him; they were released shortly thereafter. The episode led to widespread protests across the state, during which multiple casualties were reported. Contemporary reports and later analyses attributed responsibility for the crisis to actions taken by the central leadership of the Congress party, drawing criticism both within India and internationally.

Subsequently, the Governor reversed his earlier decision and reinstated Rama Rao as Chief Minister, allowing him to prove his majority in the Legislative Assembly. After securing a confidence vote, Rama Rao dissolved the Assembly and called for fresh elections. The TDP won the subsequent election with an increased majority, returning Rama Rao to office.

Later in 1984, Prime Minister Indira Gandhi was assassinated in an unrelated incident. In the ensuing 1984 Indian general election, the Congress party won a large parliamentary majority at the national level, while the TDP retained its position as the principal opposition party from Andhra Pradesh.

In 1989, several opposition parties came together to form the National Front, with Rama Rao playing a prominent role in its formation and leadership. The National Front won the 1989 Indian general election, forming a government at the centre and marking a significant shift towards coalition politics in India.

Scholars and political commentators have cited these events—particularly the 1984 Andhra Pradesh crisis and the subsequent rise of coalition governments—as contributing to changes in centre–state relations and the evolving limits on the central government's use of constitutional powers to dismiss elected state governments.

== Coup of 1995 ==
In 1995, internal divisions emerged within the Telugu Desam Party (TDP), leading to a change in leadership. A group of senior party leaders opposed what they described as the growing influence of Lakshmi Parvathi, Rama Rao's second wife, in party affairs and the state government. These disagreements culminated in a revolt within the party.

N. Chandrababu Naidu secured the support of a majority of the TDP legislators and was appointed Chief Minister of Andhra Pradesh on 1 September 1995, replacing Rama Rao. Contemporary reporting identified the controversial role attributed to Lakshmi Parvathi as a key factor contributing to the split within the party.

Following his removal from office, Rama Rao publicly expressed his opposition to the change in leadership in interviews, including statements reported by international media outlets. He died in January 1996.

After his death, Lakshmi Parvathi led a separate political faction, the NTR Telugu Desam Party. The party failed to achieve significant electoral success and was later dissolved, with Lakshmi Parvathi subsequently joining the Yuvajana Sramika Rythu Congress Party (YSRCP).

== Institutions and other establishments founded ==
- Ramakrishna Cine Studios
- Tank Bund Road
- Buddha Statue of Hyderabad
- Potti Sreeramulu Telugu University
- Dravidian University (Brain Child of NTR)
- Sri Padmavati Mahila Visvavidyalayam
- Sri Venkateswara Institute of Medical Sciences
- Dr. NTR University of Health Sciences
- Engineering Agricultural and Medical Common Entrance Test (EAMCET)
- Telugu Ganga project

== See also ==
- N. T. Rama Rao
- First N. T. Rama Rao ministry
- Third N. T. Rama Rao ministry
- List of chief ministers of Andhra Pradesh

== Bibliography ==
- Murty, K. R. (2001). Parties, elections, and mobilisation. Anmol Publications PVT. LTD. pp. 48–63. ISBN 978-81-261-0979-1.
