= Ashok (film) =

2006 Indian Telugu film

- Theatrical release poster
- Directed by: Surender Reddy
- Written by: Story: Vakkantham Vamsi; Screenplay: Surender Reddy; Dialogues: Marudhuri Raja
- Produced by: Valluripalli Ramesh Babu
- Starring: N. T. Rama Rao Jr. Sameera Reddy; Prakash Raj; Sonu Sood
- Cinematography: K. K. Senthil Kumar
- Edited by: Gautham Raju
- Music by: Mani Sharma
- Production company: Maharshi Cinema
- Distributed by: Maharshi Cinema
- Release date: July 13, 2006
- Running time: 172 minutes
- Country: India
- Language: Telugu
- Box office: est. ₹27 crore

Ashok is a 2006 Indian Telugu-language action drama film written and directed by Surender Reddy and produced by Valluripalli Ramesh Babu, under Maharshi Cinema. The film stars N. T. Rama Rao Jr. in the titular role, alongside Sameera Reddy, Prakash Raj, and Sonu Sood in pivotal roles.

The plot follows a hot-headed mechanic, desperate to reconcile with his peace-loving father, is forced to abandon his quest when a ruthless mobster threatens his family. Now, to protect his loved ones and the woman he loves, he must embrace the violence he once rejected and fight back.

The film was released on 13 July 2006. While it performed moderately at the box office on its release, it gradually gained a cult following over the years for its plot, lead actor's performance, action sequences and musical score. It was later remade in Bengali Bangladesh as Babar Kosom (2007).

== Plot ==
Ashok is a mechanic who is thrown out of his house by his father, Bhaskar Prasad because of his rash actions by engaging in fights that have led to his grandmother's death. Bhaskar still harbors anger against his son, despite Ashok's good behavior that has a positive outcome. Ashok happens to meet an insecure yet talented dancer named Anjali and falls in love with her. Anjali witnesses a crime involving KK, the leader of one of the largest crime syndicates in Andhra Pradesh. KK then tries to ensnare Anjali within his evil plans, while Ashok wages a one-man war against KK's gang. Bhaskar decides to give his son a second chance by sending him to Delhi for job. Ashok accepts this but Bhaskar tells Anjali to leave and never see him again as he was threatened by KK.

One day Ashok's friend Rajiv attempts to rescue Anjali, but KK has him killed. Ashok then avenges Rajiv's death by killing KK's brother, Panda. This enrages KK, and his gang captures Ashok's sister, demanding that Ashok hands himself over to them in return for her safety. Ashok's father drags him to KK's manor and orders him to save his sister. Ashok and KK then get into a dramatic fight at Ashok's sister's wedding. Just when it appears that Ashok will emerge the winner, KK's mother tries to shoot Ashok but accidentally kills her own son. She drops the gun and falls down dead, apparently dying of shock. The film ends with Ashok's sister getting married and Ashok receiving his father's forgiveness.

== Cast ==
- N. T. Rama Rao Jr. as Ashok
- Sameera Reddy as Anjali
- Prakash Raj as Bhaskar Prasad, Ashok's father
- Sonu Sood as Krishna Kanth “KK”
- Sudha as Ashok's mother
- Revathi as Sandhya, Ashok's sister
- Rama Prabha as Ashok's grandmother
- Seiloosh Bhaswanth as Chinna
- Rajiv Kanakala as Rajiv
- Vadivukkarasi as Yagamma, KK's mother
- Raghu Babu as Anjali's brother
- Surekha Vani as Anjali's sister-in-law
- Supreeth Reddy as Panda, KK's brother
- Venu Madhav as Jaggu
- Satyam Rajesh as Rajesh, Ashok's friend
- Jeeva as KK's henchman
- Fish Venkat as KK's henchman
- Narsing Yadav as KK's henchman
- Krishna Bhagavan as Police Inspector
- Duvvasi Mohan as TV Reporter
- Chatrapathi Sekhar as Sekhar
- Ravi Kale
- Stunt Silva

== Music ==
Ashok

Soundtrack album by Mani Sharma
- Released: 8 July 2006
- Recorded: 2006
- Genre: Soundtrack
- Length: 29:45
- Label: Aditya Music
- Producer: Mani Sharma

Mani Sharma chronology
Pokiri (2006)	Ashok (2006)	Stalin (2006)

The music was composed by Mani Sharma and released by Aditya Music.

No.	Title	Lyrics	Singer(s)	Length
1.	"Gola Gola"	Chandrabose	Ravi Varma, Sujatha Mohan	5:10
2.	"Nuvvasalu Nachale"	Bhaskarabhatla Ravi Kumar	Jassie Gift, K. S. Chitra	5:19
3.	"Yekantanga Unna"	Chandrabose	Karunya	4:21
4.	"Oka Chinni Navve Navvi"	Chandrabose	KK	5:11
5.	"Jabiliki Vennelalistha"	Chandrabose	Hariharan, Sri Vardhini	4:42
6.	"Mumtaju Mahalu"	Chandrabose	Devan Ekambaram, Tanvi Shah	5:02
Total length:				29:45

== Release ==
The film was given a ‘A’ certificate from the censor board and was shot in Super 35 format. It was released with 228 prints.

The film was later dubbed and released in Tamil, Hindi, Hindustani, and Bhojpuri as Ashok and The Fighterman Ghayal (2008) respectively. The Kannada Dubbed version was telecasted on Zee Kannada.

== Reception ==
The film collected ₹25 crore in its opening weekend.
