= Rakhi (2006 film) =

2006 Indian film by Krishna Vamsi

- Theatrical release poster
- Directed by: Krishna Vamsi
- Written by: Krishna Vamsi; Sainath Thotapalli (Dialogue)
- Screenplay by: Krishna Vamsi
- Story by: Krishna Vamsi
- Produced by: K. L. Narayana; S. Gopal Reddy (Presenter)
- Starring: N. T. Rama Rao Jr. Ileana D'Cruz; Charmme Kaur
- Cinematography: S. Gopal Reddy
- Edited by: Shankar
- Music by: Devi Sri Prasad
- Production company: Sri Durga Arts
- Release date: 22 December 2006 (India)
- Running time: 173 minutes
- Country: India
- Language: Telugu

Rakhi is a 2006 Indian Telugu-language action drama film directed by Krishna Vamsi. The film stars N. T. Rama Rao Jr., Ileana D'Cruz, Charmme Kaur, Suhasini, Sarath Babu, Chandra Mohan, Brahmaji, Kota Srinivasa Rao, Saranya Ponvannan, Brahmanandam, Sunil and Sayaji Shinde. play other supporting roles. The music was composed by Devi Sri Prasad, while the cinematography and editing were handled by S. Gopal Reddy and Shankar.

The film follows Ramakrishna (Rakhi), a young middle-class man whose world shatters when his pregnant sister is murdered over dowry. After the justice system fails his family, he transforms into a vigilante, targeting those who exploit, abuse, and kill women. As society becomes divided over his methods, Rakhi ignites a powerful debate on justice, gender-based violence, and moral action.

Rakhi was released with 250 prints and became a sleeper hit at the box office. N. T. Rama Rao Jr.'s performance received widespread acclaim and is regarded as one of the finest of his career.

== Plot ==
Ramakrishna, aka Rakhi, aspires to become a railway stationmaster like his father. His love interest and close friend, Tripura, is a reporter on a TV channel who exposes atrocities against women in society. For Rakhi, his sister Gayathri is everything. She is married to a software professional who plans to go to the USA. However, his uncle brought a proposal where he would get 1 crore as a dowry. At first, they try to get rid of her by fighting with Rakhi and demanding more dowry, but when Gayathri overhears them, they burn her alive. Devastated by this, as she was also pregnant, Rakhi's family tried to sue them in court, but a corrupt lawyer, a policeman, and a doctor fabricated that Gayathri was mentally disturbed and had committed suicide. Rakhi was unable to accept this. Tripura calls Rakhi's father and grandfather for the second hearing of the case.

In a graveyard, Rakhi is still in shock, and looking at Gayathri's ashes, he hallucinates and sees Gayathri screaming near him and burnt to death, eventually seeing that every girl like Gayathri is tortured, killed, molested, and burnt, and they also call him "brother". In a rage, he burns her in-laws and all those people who fabricated things about her in front of the court in the same way Gayathri's in-laws burnt her alive. He researches the atrocities on the women at Tripura's office. Tripura is shocked to see him, as he had murdered the perpetrators of Gayathri, including the corrupt lawyer, doctor, and police officer. He then explains to her that every woman is harassed, killed, and tortured like Gayathri, even molested, and the world is filled with these wretched men who think that a woman is vulnerable, also showing an information paper. His grandfather tells him to forget everything that has happened, but his father understands everything and tells him to continue punishing the sadistic men, also stopping him from worrying about his family.

Rakhi starts a manhunt for all sex offenders, sex traffickers, and perverted men and burns them alive while dropping a rakhi at every site. A police officer named Meenakshi Iyer is leading the hunt for him, and the entire police force is in a dilemma as the public women all consider Rakhi to be a god, and all men are staying away from women as they do not want to be killed. Meenakshi states that Rakhi is either a terrorist, a factionist, a naxalite, or a member of the dacoits who wants publicity for doing these, and she will arrest him within 24 hours.

Along with Tripura, Rakhi explains his story to the people, including Meenakshi and her team. He also explains why he is doing this and what will happen after these incidents. Meenakshi even arrests Tripura for recording Rakhi live on the TV program. Tripura is ashamed that Meenakshi is trying to arrest a man who is stopping the sex offenders/misogynists as an act for the people, especially the women. Eventually, the police keep a reward of 10 lakhs for nabbing Rakhi. Rakhi goes to meet his father, grandfather, aunt, and cousin Gowri. He explains that he is not the previous Rakhi anymore.

Rakhi eventually surrenders to Meenakshi and goes to jail, but Meenakshi asks him why he surrendered, and he smiles at her. It leads her to research Rakhi's next victim. It is revealed that he did so to kill a love-crazed man, Madhukar, who killed Gayathri's friend, Srilatha, because of repeatedly refusing his proposal.

Meenakshi talks to Rakhi after being verbally abused and kicked by the state minister, whose son was also killed by Rakhi, and she realizes that what Rakhi is doing is correct, as the law is protecting all those men from death after abusing women, even sharing her feelings with him. Enraged, Rakhi also kills the minister after he places a bomb outside Rakhi's jail that kills many women who came forward to Rakhi to tie rakhis on his wrist, including Gowri. Rakhi goes to court, and upon the judge seeing that Rakhi did justice to the country, resigns from his post and announces that he will be Rakhi's lawyer and get him acquitted. The film ends with Rakhi motivating all the women outside the court to support him.

== Cast ==
- N. T. Rama Rao Jr. as K. Ramakrishna aka Rakhi
- Ileana D'Cruz as Tripura Sundari
- Charmme Kaur as Gowri
- Chandra Mohan as Chandram, Rakhi's father
- Brahmanandam as the owner of Sridevi Channel
- Sunil as Mohan Reddy
- Brahmaji as Ranga, Rakhi's brother
- Kota Srinivasa Rao as Lakshmi Narayana, Rakhi's grandfather
- Janaki Sabesh as Rajyalakshmi, Tripura's mother
- Saranya Ponvannan as Savthriyamma, Gowri's mother
- Suhasini Maniratnam as Meenakshi Iyer
- Sarath Babu as Police Commissioner
- Manjusha as Gayathri, Rakhi's sister
- Ravi Varma as Sudhakar Reddy, Gayathri's husband
- Sayaji Shinde as State Minister
- Tanikella Bharani as Criminal Lawyer Sachidanandam
- Duvvasi Mohan as Minister's secretary
- Master Ajai as Meenakshi Iyer's son
- Rani Pandey as Prostitution Racket Head
- Bharat as Bharat, the Railway Minister's son
- M. S. Narayana as Narayana
- Amit Tiwari as Madhukar
- Dharmavarapu Subramanyam as Station master
- Harsha Vardhan as Auto Driver
- Sameer as Police Inspector
- Satyam Rajesh as Police Officer
- Krishna Bhagavaan as Minister's aide
- Kondavalasa Lakshmana Rao as Lakshmana
- Bharath Reddy as Bharat's friend
- Uttej as a crew member of Sridevi Channel
- Srilalitha as Srilatha, Gayathri's friend
- Prakash Raj as Judge (Guest role)
- Raghu Karumanchi as a man struck in police checking (cameo appearance)
- Prabhas Sreenu as a clerk standing beside the Judge (cameo appearance)

== Music ==
The film has six songs composed by Devi Sri Prasad. The music was well received.

Rakhi

Soundtrack album by Devi Sri Prasad
- Released: 2006
- Recorded: 2006
- Genre: Soundtrack
- Length: 29:18
- Label: Aditya Music
- Producer: Devi Sri Prasad

Devi Sri Prasad chronology
| Unakkum Enakkum (2006) | Rakhi (2006) | Jagadam (2007) |

Track list
| No. | Title | Lyrics | Singer(s) | Length |
|---|---|---|---|---|
| 1. | "Rangu Rabba Rabba" | Suddala Ashok Teja | Amalraj, Priya Himesh | 06:05 |
| 2. | "Zara Zara" | Sirivennela Seetharama Sastry | Andrea Jeremiah | 04:36 |
| 3. | "Vasthava Vasthava" | Chandrabose | Jassie Gift, M. M. Srilekha | 04:27 |
| 4. | "Rakhi Rakhi" | Sirivennela Seetharama Sastry | Devi Sri Prasad, Mamta Mohandas | 05:33 |
| 5. | "Kallallo Kaalagni" | Suddala Ashok Teja | S. P. Balasubrahmanyam | 04:33 |
| 6. | "Ninnu Choosthe" | Chandrabose | Shankar Mahadevan, Gopika Poornima | 04:04 |
| Total length: | | | | 29:18 |

== Release ==
The film was released on 545 screens, including 431 in Andhra Pradesh, 29 in Karnataka, six in Orissa, three in Tamil Nadu, three in Mumbai and 73 overseas. The film's dubbed versions were released in Tamil, Hindi, and Bhojpuri as Rakhi, The Return of Kaalia and Kaalia respectively. It was also dubbed in Kannada under the same title.

== Reception ==
The film had a 100-day run in 30-centres.
