= Naaga =

2003 Indian film by D. K. Suresh

- Theatrical Release Poster
- Directed by: D. K. Suresh
- Written by: Story: Sri Surya Movies; Screenplay: A. M. Rathnam; Dialogues: Paruchuri Brothers
- Produced by: A. M. Rathnam
- Starring: N. T. Rama Rao Jr. Jennifer Kotwal; Sadha
- Cinematography: K. Ravindra Babu
- Edited by: Kola Bhaskar
- Music by: Deva (4 songs); Vidyasagar (2 songs)
- Production company: Sri Surya Movies
- Release date: 10 January 2003 (India)
- Running time: 172 minutes
- Country: India
- Language: Telugu

Naaga is a 2003 Indian Telugu-language political action film starring N. T. Rama Rao Jr., Jennifer Kotwal and Sadha. The film is directed by D. K. Suresh, and the film's music was composed by music directors Vidyasagar and Deva. It was released on 10 January 2003 to negative reviews and was declared a flop at the box office. The film's storyline was compared to Mudhalvan (1999).

== Plot ==
A man wages a battle against politicians and their dishonourable ways of campaigning when some political goons harm his father and sister due to a trivial issue.

== Cast ==
- N. T. Rama Rao Jr. as Suryadevara Nagaraju "Naaga"
- Jennifer Kotwal as Angel
- Sadha as Vijji
- Raghuvaran as Suryadevara Krishnamurthy, Naaga's father
- Nassar as CM
- Rajan P. Dev as Home Minister
- Sudeepa Pinky as Naaga's sister
- Shakeela as Mandaram
- Paruchuri Gopala Krishna as Potti Kasaiah
- Sunil as Ravi
- Tanikella Bharani as Subramaniam "Subbu", Viji's father
- Varsha
- Sudha
- Easwari Rao as Vijji's sister
- Srinivasa Reddy
- Siva Reddy
- Babloo Prithiveeraj
- Anand
- Rajeev Kanakala
- Venu Madhav
- L.B. Sriram
- P. J. Sarma
- M. S. Narayana
- Narra Venkateswara Rao
- Surya
- Rambha as an item number in the song "Naayudori Pilla"
- Raghava Lawrence in a guest appearance in the song "Naayudori Pilla"
- Shobi in a guest appearance in the song "Oka Konte Pillane"
- Anasuya Bharadwaj in an uncredited role as a law college student

== Soundtrack ==
The music was composed by Deva and Vidyasagar. The audio release function was held on 22 December 2002 at Annapoorna Studios with K Ashok Kumar, KL Narayana, KS Rama Rao, Kodali Nani, M. S. Raju, Naga Lakshmi and Tarun as special guests.

Except for "Naayudori Pilla", all other songs were reused from Tamil films: three songs were reused from Kushi (2000) ("Macarena" as "Macarina Macarina", "Oru Ponnu Onnu" as "Oka Konte Pillane", "Megam Karukuthu" as "Megham Karigenu") and two songs from Dhool (2003) ("Ithanundu Muthathile" as "Entha Chinna Muddu", "Koduva Meesai" as "Anakapalli Centrelo") both produced by Rathnam with the music of latter film also being composed by Vidyasagar. The soundtrack version of "Oka Konte Pillane" featured vocals of Karthik while the film version utilized vocals provided by Hariharan.

Naaga

Soundtrack album by Deva Vidyasagar
- Released: 22 December 2002
- Recorded: 2002
- Genre: Soundtrack
- Length: 32:22
- Label: Aditya Music
- Producers: Deva; Vidyasagar

Track list
No.	Title	Lyrics	Music	Singer(s)	Length
1.	"Entha Chinna Muddu"	A. M. Rathnam	Vidyasagar	Udit Narayan, Shreya Ghoshal	04:27
2.	"Macarina Macarina"	A. M. Rathnam	Deva	Devan, Sowmya Raoh	06:44
3.	"Naayudori Pilla"	Kulasekhar	Deva	Mano	04:39
4.	"Oka Konte Pillane"	A. M. Rathnam	Deva	Karthik, Hariharan, Anuradha Sriram	05:39
5.	"Megham Karigenu"	A. M. Rathnam	Deva	Karthik, Chinmayi	06:07
6.	"Anakapalli Centrelo"	Chandrabose	Vidyasagar	Karthik, Tippu, Chandran, Vasu, Manikka Vinayagam, Timy	04:46
Total length:					32:22

== Release and reception ==
Jeevi of Idlebrain.com rated the film two-and-three-quarters out of five and wrote that "The main asset of the film is NTR and one may watch this film once for NTR". A critic from Sify wrote that "The film on the whole is a political ‘kichidi’ to expose the opposition parties and our larger-than-life hero’s prescription for miracle cure for the state!" A critic from Full Hyderabad rated the film six out of ten and wrote that "Naaga is like a lavish yet routine Andhra meal with the right amount of spice, zing, color and flavor. Predictable, yet palatable".

It was dubbed in Hindi as Mera Kanoon.
