= Naa Alludu =

2005 Indian film by Vara Mullapudi

- Film poster
- Directed by: Vara Mullapudi
- Screenplay by: V. Vijayendra Prasad; M. Rathnam; Sai Vidhyarthi
- Story by: V. Vijayendra Prasad
- Produced by: A. Bharati
- Starring: N. T. Rama Rao Jr. Genelia; Shriya; Ramya Krishna
- Cinematography: K. Ravindra Babu
- Edited by: Kotagiri Venkateswara Rao
- Music by: Devi Sri Prasad
- Release date: 14 January 2005
- Running time: 161 minutes
- Country: India
- Language: Telugu

Naa Alludu (transl. My son-in-law) is a 2005 Indian Telugu-language action comedy film directed by Vara Mullapudi. The film stars N. T. Rama Rao Jr., Shriya, and Genelia with Ramya Krishna, Suman, Rajiv Kanakala, Charan Raj, Brahmanandam, and Ali in supporting roles. It received mixed-to-negative reviews and was a box-office bomb.

== Plot ==
Karthik challenges a level-headed industrialist named Bhanumati that he would marry either of her daughters to take revenge on her for insulting him in his interview to get a job in her company. Meghana falls for Karthik just for the one accidental kiss he gives her. The younger one, Gagana, too follows suit, and now, Karthik has a grip over both of Bhanumati's daughters. Competing with him is Bhanumati's nephew Rahul, whose father Jayaraj encourages him to chase his cousins and marry either of them to inherit their property. It is revealed in the flashback that Bhanumati leaves her husband Venkayya Naidu and that Karthik (Suryam) is her nephew. How the responsible son-in-law sets his mother-in-law right and eliminates the villains from the game is what the story is about.

== Cast ==
- N. T. Rama Rao Jr. as Karthik (Suryam) alias Thenga Vandi (transl. Coconut cart) Murugan
- Genelia D'Souza as Gagana, Bhanumati And Chandram's daughter (Voice Dubbed by Sunitha)
- Shriya Saran as Meghana, Bhanumati And Chandram's daughter (Voice Dubbed by Gopika Poornima)
- Ramya Krishna as Bhanumathi Devi, Gagana And Mehgana's mother (Voice Dubbed by Saritha)
- Suman as Venkayya Naidu, Bhanumathi's husband, Gagana And Meghana's father
- Rajiv Kanakala as Rahul
- Charan Raj as Jayaraj
- Brahmanandam as New Zealand inspector Lolakullu
- Ali as Lingappa aka Dongappa, Karthik's friend
- Nassar as Sripathi, Karthik's Father
- Sudha as Lakshmi, Sripathi's wife
- Krishna Bhagawan as Alahari
- Kota Srinivasa Rao as Bilahari
- Teja Sajja as Suryam and Chandram
- Hema as Alahari's wife
- Rallapalli as the temple priest
- Ananth

== Production ==
The muhurat shot of the film took place on 29 May 2004 and the film was titled as Alludu.

During a 2024 interview, Shriya shared an incident involving the film's producer, who attempted suicide by jumping into a lake due to financial issues related to the film's excessive budget. She recalled that while she and Genelia were preparing to collect payments from the producer, he had already jumped into the lake but was fortunately rescued.

== Music ==
The music was composed by Devi Sri Prasad and released by Aditya Music. The audio release function was held in Araku with B. Gopal as the chief guest.

Naa Alludu

Soundtrack album by Devi Sri Prasad
- Released: 3 January 2005
- Recorded: 2005
- Genre: Soundtrack
- Length: 34:41
- Label: Aditya Music
- Producer: Devi Sri Prasad

Devi Sri Prasad chronology
Mass (2004)	Naa Alludu (2005)	Nuvvostanante Nenoddantana (2005)

Track list
No.	Title	Lyrics	Singer(s)	Length
1.	"Andhala Bomaro"	Vennelakanti	Venu Srirangam, Sumangali	4:21
2.	"Sayya Sayyare"	Sahithi	Karthik, Malathy Lakshman	5:59
3.	"Kandhi Chenu Kada"	Sahithi	Jassie Gift, Kalpana	6:13
4.	"En Peru Murugan"	Sahithi	Shankar Mahadevan, Grace Karunas	4:56
5.	"Nadumu Chooste"	Veturi	Tippu, K. S. Chithra	4:56
6.	"Pattuko Pattuko"	Veturi	Ranjith, Padmavathi	4:17
7.	"Pilla Choodu"	Sahithi	Mano, Prasanna Rao, Kalpana	3:59
Total length:				34:41

== Reception ==
A critic from Sify wrote that "But of you are looking for entertainment without any sense of logic packaged with crude jokes and double meaning dialogues you may like it, but the censors have cut a good part of it! Alas Naa Alludu isn't sinfully exciting enough!" Jeevi of Idlebrain.com rated the film two out of five and wrote that "On a whole, this film disappoints". A critic from Indiaglitz wrote that "Naa Alludu as a film is a simple and straightforward waste of time. Period". A critic from Full Hyderabad rated the film one out of ten and wrote that "Naa Alludu is so bad, you wouldn't watch it even if you were 100% sure that no one would ever find out".

== Dubbed versions ==
The film was dubbed and released in Tamil as Madurai Mappilai and in Hindi as Main Hoon Gambler.
