= Brahmarshi Viswamitra =

1991 Indian film by N. T. Rama Rao

- Theatrical release poster
- Directed by: N. T. Rama Rao
- Written by: Naga Bhairava Koteswara Rao (dialogues)
- Screenplay by: N. T. Rama Rao
- Based on: Life of Vishvamitra
- Produced by: N. T. Rama Rao
- Starring: N. T. Rama Rao; Nandamuri Balakrishna; Meenakshi Seshadri
- Cinematography: Nandamuri Mohana Krishna
- Edited by: N. T. Rama Rao
- Music by: Ravindra Jain
- Production company: NTR Charity Trust
- Release date: 19 April 1991
- Running time: 148 minutes
- Country: India
- Language: Telugu

Brahmarshi Viswamitra is a 1991 Indian Telugu-language Hindu mythological film directed and produced by N. T. Rama Rao. Based on the life of the sage Viswamitra, the film marks Rama Rao's return to acting after a seven-year hiatus following his focus on politics. It stars Rama Rao alongside Nandamuri Balakrishna, and Meenakshi Seshadri, with music composed by Ravindra Jain. The film also marks the debut of Jr. NTR as a child artist. Despite its notable cast, Brahmarshi Viswamitra was a disaster at the box office.

== Cast ==
- N. T. Rama Rao as Viswamithra & Ravana (dual role)
- Nandamuri Balakrishna as Sathya Harichandra & Dushyantha (dual role)
- Meenakshi Seshadri as Menaka
- Deepika Chikhalia as Chandramathi
- Ganesh and Kumaresh as Rama and Lakshmana
- Madhumita as Shakuntala
- Amjhad Khan as Veerabahu
- Gummadi as Vashista
- Suthi Velu as Nakshatraka
- Ashok Kumar as Indhra
- KK Sarma as Kalakoushukudu
- Jaya Bhaskar as Trisanku
- Aruna Irani as Kalakoushukudu's wife
- Kanaka as Seetha
- Tara as Shakuntala's friend
- Gayatri as Shakuntala's friend
- Disco Shanti as Matanga Kanya
- Kuyili as Matanga Kanya
- Master Amith as Lohitha
- N. T. Rama Rao Jr. as Bharata (child role)
- Mikkilineni as Janaka

== Production ==
Brahmarshi Viswamitra marks the first screen appearance of N. T. Rama Rao Jr., who played Bharata. Initially, actress Sridevi was approached for the role Menaka but she denied as her shooting schedule is packed.

== Soundtrack ==
Brahmarshi Viswamitra

Film score by Ravindra Jain
- Released: 1991
- Genre: Soundtrack
- Length: 56:47
- Label: Lahari Music
- Producer: Ravindra Jain

Music composed by Ravindra Jain. Lyrics written by C. Narayana Reddy. Music released on Lahari Music Company.

| No. | Title | Singer(s) | Length |
|---|---|---|---|
| 1. | "Endaro Bulipinchina" | P. Susheela, S. P. Balasubrahmanyam | 6:18 |
| 2. | "Priya Cheliya" | K. J. Yesudas, P. Susheela | 7:55 |
| 3. | "Ee Chinnadi" | P. Susheela, Kavita Krishnamurthy | 5:27 |
| 4. | "Ganga Taranga" | K. J. Yesudas | 2:04 |
| 5. | "Ramaiah O Ramaiah" | P. Susheela, S. P. Balasubrahmanyam | 6:22 |
| 6. | "Jayathe Viswamitra Maharshi" | S. P. Balasubrahmanyam | 16:45 |
| 7. | "Kausalya Suprajarama" | K. J. Yesudas | 0:38 |
| Total length: | | | 56:47 |
