= Samba (2004 film) =

2004 Telugu film by V. V. Vinayak

- Film Poster
- Directed by: V. V. Vinayak
- Screenplay by: V. V. Vinayak
- Dialogues by: Kona Venkat
- Story by: G. S. Rao
- Produced by: Kodali Nani
- Starring: N. T. Rama Rao Jr.; Bhoomika; Genelia; Prakash Raj
- Cinematography: K. Ravindra Babu
- Edited by: Gautham Raju
- Music by: Mani Sharma
- Production company: Kodali Movies
- Release date: 9 June 2004
- Running time: 162 minutes
- Country: India
- Language: Telugu

Samba is a 2004 Indian Telugu-language action film directed by V. V. Vinayak and produced by Kodali Nani. The film stars N. T. Rama Rao Jr., Bhoomika Chawla, Genelia D'Souza, and Prakash Raj while Vijayakumar, Ali, Sithara, Sukumari, Sukanya, and Brahmaji play supporting roles. The music was composed by Mani Sharma with cinematography by K. Ravindra Babu and editing by Gautham Raju. The film was released on 9 June 2004.

The film follows Sambasiva Naidu, the son of a faction leader, who seeks revenge after a family betrayal and his sister’s suicide. Amidst the violence, Samba strives to fulfill his father’s dream of making education accessible to all in the faction-ridden region of Rayalaseema, but Pasupathi stands in his way.

It was remade in Kannada as Mandya (2006). It was dubbed in Hindi, Bhojpuri, and Odia under the same name.

== Plot ==
Dharmayya Naidu is a factionist who lost his wife because he is uneducated. Hence, he wants to facilitate education in his Seema area by constructing schools. He realizes that the quarry he owns has good-quality granite deposits. Samba is Dharmayya Naidu's son, while Pasupathi is Dharmayya Naidu's son-in-law. Pasupathi plays the game in such a way that Dharmayya Naidu is forced to give granite quarry as a dowry to Pasupathi's family, due to which Dharmayya Naidu's daughter kills herself. When Samba learns the reason behind his sister's suicide, he occupies the quarry and kills Pasupathi's brothers. Pasupathi then kills everybody in Samba's house in retaliation. Samba and his nemesis Pasupathi take shelter in Kanchi and Amritsar respectively as police ban them from entering AP for a year. Samba settles as a sari manufacturer and trader in Kanchi (Tamil Nadu). The rest of the story is all about how he returns to Seema, takes vengeance against Pasupathi, and starts serving in the educational field.

== Cast ==
- N. T. Rama Rao Jr. as Sambasiva Naidu
- Prakash Raj as Pasupathi Naidu
- Bhoomika as Nandu (Voice Dubbed by Savitha Reddy)
- Genelia as Sandhya (Voice Dubbed by Sunitha Upadrashta)
- Vijayakumar as Dharmayya Naidu
- Ali as Saththi alias Panchakattu Basha (Samba's friend)
- Sithara as Janaki, Samba's sister (Voice Dubbed by Shilpa)
- Sukumari as Samba's grandmother
- Krishna Bhagavan as Pasupathi's sidekick
- Sukanya as Pasupathi's wife
- Brahmaji as Pasupathi's brother
- Subbaraju as Pasupathi's brother
- Tanikella Bharani as Nandu's father
- Ahuti Prasad as Sandhya's father
- Chalapathi Rao as Pasupathi's father-in-law
- Raghu Babu as Inspector Tiger
- Mansoor Ali Khan as Mani Rathnam (McDowell Kunju Mani)
- Venu Madhav as Sanathnagar Sathi
- Sameer Hasan as Prasad IPS (Police Inspector)
- G. V. Sudhakar Naidu as Sesha Reddy
- Teja Sajja as Chinna
- Prasanna
- Pragathi as Samba's mother

== Production ==
N. T. Rama Rao Jr. wanted to work with Kodali Nani since 1999. Nani decided to make a film with Vinayak after watching the rushes of Aadi. The project titled Samba was launched on 10 October 2003. The film's story was provided by G. S. Rao with Kona Venkat penning dialogues. The title song was choreographed by Prabhu Deva which marked his first collaboration with Jr. NTR. The film's story revolved around the backdrop of Kanchi.

== Soundtrack ==
The music was composed by Mani Sharma and released by Aditya Music. The audio release function was held on 20 May 2004 coincided with N. T. Rama Rao Jr.'s twenty-first birthday at Taj residency with B. Gopal, D. Suresh Babu, KL Narayana and S. S. Rajamouli as chief guests.

Samba

Soundtrack album by Mani Sharma
- Released: 2004
- Recorded: 2004
- Genre: Soundtrack
- Length: 29:58
- Label: Aditya Music
- Producer: Mani Sharma

Mani Sharma chronology
Adavi Ramudu (2004)	Samba (2004)	Yagnam (2004)

Track list
No.	Title	Lyrics	Singer(s)	Length
1.	"Dam Damare Dam Dam"	Chandrabose	Shankar Mahadevan	5:01
2.	"Tagilinadi Rabba"	Bhuvana Chandra	S. P. B. Charan, Ganga	4:51
3.	"Kitha Kithalu Pettamaku"	Suddala Ashok Teja	Mano, Swarnalatha	5:13
4.	"Nandamuri Chandamama"	Bhuvana Chandra	S. P. B. Charan, Sujatha Mohan	4:55
5.	"Luxemburg Lux Sundari"	Sahithi	Karthik, Mahalakshmi Iyer	4:38
6.	"Namaste Namaste"	Chandra Bose	Tippu, K. S. Chithra	5:20
Total length:				29:58

== Reception ==
Jeevi of Idlebrain.com wrote that "Over all, Samba is a good film for masses and is a definite hit". A critic from Sify wrote that " If you are an NTR fan and is looking out for simple entertainment, go and watch Samba".
