= Ninnu Choodalani =

2001 film V. R. Prathap

- Poster
- Directed by: V. R. Prathap
- Written by: V. R. Prathap
- Produced by: Ramoji Rao
- Starring: N. T. Rama Rao Jr. Raveena Rajput; K. Viswanath; Kaikala Satyanarayana
- Cinematography: K. Prasad
- Music by: S. A. Rajkumar
- Production company: Ushakiran Movies
- Release date: 23 May 2001
- Running time: 158 minutes
- Country: India
- Language: Telugu

Ninnu Choodalani (transl. Want to see you) is a 2001 Indian Telugu-language romantic drama film directed by V. R. Prathap, starring N. T. Rama Rao Jr. and Raveena Rajput in their debut. The film was a box-office bomb.

== Plot ==
The twin cities sport two sweet shop giants in the form of Siva Reddy (K. Viswanath) and Sahadeva Reddy (Kaikala Satyanarayana). Venu (N. T. Rama Rao Jr.) is the teenage grandson of Siva Reddy and Siri (Raveena Rajput) is the granddaughter of Sahadeva Reddy. Venu happens to see Siri on the day of Holi and falls in love with her at the first sight. He gets hold of a photograph of her and then uses her photograph to put up a hoarding in Abids area asking her to call up his number. The parents of Siri notice their daughter's portrait on the advertisement of Siva Reddy sweets. The rivalry between Siva Reddy and Sahadeva Reddy intensifies. Siri falls in love with Venu, since she likes the kind of attention he gives to her, as she is a neglected girl in her house. Its elections time and Siva Reddy and Sahadeva Reddy are given MLA tickets from two opposition parties. Siva Reddy and Sahadeva Reddy advises their grandkids not to meet each other till the elections are completed. Venu packs up to Shimla along with his uncle as Siri visits her relative's village. Meanwhile, the parents of Siri try to arrange wedding for her. Fed up with this, Siri travels alone to Shimla in search of Venu. The rest of the story revolves around how the lovers get united and sort out the differences between the families.

== Cast ==
- N. T. Rama Rao Jr. as Venu Reddy
- Raveena Rajput as Siri Reddy
- K. Viswanath as Siva Reddy
- Kaikala Satyanarayana as Sahadeva Reddy
- Kantha Rao.
- Annapoorna as Venu's grandmother
- Sivaji Raja as Venu's uncle
- Ramachandra as Venu's friend
- B.H.Tarun Kumar.
- Maharshi Raghava
- Rallapalli
- Sudha
- Sirija
- Ragini

== Soundtrack ==
The music was scored by veteran composer S. A. Rajkumar and Released by Mayuri Audio. The music was the only highlight of the film, with a mix of good melodies, and mass numbers.

Ninnu Choodalani

Soundtrack album by S. A. Rajkumar
- Released: 2001
- Recorded: 2001
- Genre: Soundtrack
- Length: 28:45
- Label: Mayuri Audio
- Producer: S. A. Rajkumar

Track list
No.	Title	Lyrics	Singer(s)	Length
1.	"Oopirochina Bapu Bomma"	Sirivennela Seetharama Sastry	K. S. Chithra, Rajesh Krishnan	4:53
2.	"Campus Lo Kaaletti"	Chandrabose	Devan	4:53
3.	"Emaindo Emogani"	Sirivennela Seetharama Sastry	P. Unnikrishnan, Harini	4:31
4.	"E Chota Nenunna"	Veturi	Hariharan, Mahalakshmi Iyer	5:21
5.	"Ennallo Vechaka"	Bhuvana Chandra	Sonu Nigam, Anuradha Sriram	4:43
6.	"Muddabanti Poovammo"	Suddala Ashok Teja	Udit Narayan, Lenina	4:24
Total length:				28:45

== Reception ==
Jeevi of Idlebrain.com rated the film 2/5 and criticized the performances of the debutant actors. "Poor screenplay adds up to the poor emoting by the lead pair giving a torrid time", he added. Andhra Today wrote "With an inane story and a screenplay to match along with poor performances from the lead pair, this movie is a true test to the audience's patience. This movie does not offer much competition to the current trend of variety entertainers. Usha Kiran banner too may not earn much credit for this movie". Telugucinema wrote "Otherwise an average teenage love story has become interesting with this star kid’s presence as he exhibits the traits of Nandamuri family in his mannerisms and acting. He is reasonably good but needs to shed fat and work hard to make the career. Raveena too did her best and complemented the hero well. Both Viswanath and Satyanarayana too have notable performance".
