= Adhurs =

2010 film directed by V. V. Vinayak

- Theatrical release poster
- Directed by: V. V. Vinayak
- Screenplay by: V. V. Vinayak
- Story by: Kona Venkat
- Produced by: Vallabhaneni Vamsi Mohan
- Starring: N. T. Rama Rao Jr. Nayanthara; Sheela
- Cinematography: Chota K. Naidu
- Edited by: Gautham Raju
- Music by: Devi Sri Prasad
- Production company: Vaishnavi Arts
- Distributed by: Reliance Big Entertainment
- Release date: 13 January 2010
- Running time: 150 minutes
- Country: India
- Language: Telugu
- Budget: ₹26 crore
- Box office: est. ₹28–30 crore distributor share

Adhurs (transl. Marvelous) is a 2010 Indian Telugu-language action comedy film directed by V. V. Vinayak who co-wrote the film with Kona Venkat. Produced by Vallabhaneni Vamsi Mohan, the film stars N. T. Rama Rao Jr. in a dual role alongside Nayanthara and Sheela. Mahesh Manjrekar, Ashish Vidyarthi, Brahmanandam, Sayaji Shinde, Nassar and Tanikella Bharani played supporting roles. The music is composed by Devi Sri Prasad, with cinematography by Chota K. Naidu.

The film follows twin brothers who are separated at birth, one grows up as a witty Brahmin priest named Chari, while the other becomes an undercover agent. When a dangerous mission and a sinister conspiracy threaten their lives, the two are unknowingly drawn into each other’s worlds, leading to hilarious misunderstandings, high-stakes action, and an eventual reunion.

Made on a budget of ₹26 crore, the film collected a distributor share of ₹28–30 crore, becoming a commercial success. It received positive reviews from both audiences and critics for its fast-paced narrative, performances, music and entertainment value. NTR Jr.'s portrayal of Chari, the priest with impeccable comic timing, has since become iconic.

== Plot ==
The story follows the birth of identical twin boys to a poor woman. A nurse and an elderly woman, grieving the loss of her own still born grandson, secretly swap one of the twins with her deceased grandchild. They justify the act by believing both families would benefit, one avoiding further heartbreak, the other gaining the means to raise just one child given her dire financial situation.

The twins grow up in drastically different environments. One boy, Narasimha, is raised in a tough neighborhood and becomes a fearless and street-smart young man. He works as an undercover agent for the police and aspires to become an officer. He is deeply committed to justice and is in love with Nandu, the daughter of a senior police officer. The other twin, Chari, is raised by a traditional Brahmin family and grows up to be a devout priest. Gentle and soft-spoken, Chari works without pay under his eccentric guru, Bhattacharya (Bhattu), to repay a family debt.

Bhattu is in love with a young woman named Chandrakala (Chandu), whom he financially supports along with her mother, hoping she will eventually marry him. Unaware of his intentions, Chandu continues to use his help for survival. Bhattu enlists Chari’s help to win Chandu’s heart. They take her to a pub, but when goons harass her, Bhattu flees. Just then, Narasimha arrives at the same pub with his girlfriend and beats up the harassers. Chandu mistakes Narasimha for Chari and falls for him, thinking he is brave and bold.

Meanwhile, a terrorist group led by Dhanraj is hunting down a famous army scientist, who is the twins’ biological father. They kidnap Narasimha, hoping to pressure his father into developing a deadly weapon. In Narasimha’s absence, the gang stumbles upon Chari and, mistaking him for Narasimha, offers him a large sum to impersonate the missing man. Desperate for money, Chari agrees but finds himself trapped in a dangerous game far beyond his experience.

Chari’s bumbling attempts to act like the tough Narasimha lead to a series of comic and tense encounters. Eventually, Narasimha escapes captivity, discovers the impersonation, and the brothers finally come face to face. The truth about their origins is revealed, and they reunite with their father. The twins join forces to defeat the terrorists, rescue their father, and destroy the deadly device. In the end, the family is reunited, and balance is restored, with Narasimha earning respect as a true hero and Chari finding love and purpose in his own unique way.

== Cast ==
- N. T. Rama Rao Jr. in a dual role as
  - Narasimha
  - Chari
- Nayanthara as Chandrakala aka Chandhu
- Sheela as Nandhu
- Brahmanandam as Bhattacharya "Bhattu"
- Mahesh Manjrekar as Don Baba
- Ashish Vidyarthi as Dhanraj
- Nassar as retired Major-turned-scientist, Narasimha and Chari's father
- Vinaya Prasad as Narasimha and Chari's mother
- Tanikella Bharani as Chari's adoptive father
- Rajyalakshmi as Chari's adoptive mother
- Sayaji Shinde as Ram Nayak IPS, Nandhu's father
- Rama Prabha as Chandrakala's mother
- Sudha as Indira, Naik's wife
- Mukul Dev as Rasool, a big gang leader
- Supreeth Reddy as Pandu
- M. S. Narayana as Bhasha Bhai
- Raghu Babu as Calcutta Meetha, Baba's right hand & Ram nayak’s friend
- Prudhviraj as Police Inspector
- Vatsala Rajagopal as Chari's adoptive grandmother
- Kondavalasa Lakshmana Rao as Roaring Star Roshan Babu
- Ananth Babu as Peri Sastry
- Fish Venkat as Venkat
- Raja Ravindra as Pandu's brother
- Raghu Karumanchi as Pandu's gang member
- V.V. Vinayak as himself (cameo appearance in credits)

== Music ==
Adhurs

Soundtrack album by Devi Sri Prasad
- Released: 5 December 2009
- Genre: Film soundtrack
- Length: 31:31
- Label: Aditya Music
- Producer: Devi Sri Prasad

Devi Sri Prasad chronology
Arya 2 (2009)	Adhurs (2009)	Kutty (2010)

The soundtrack was composed by Devi Sri Prasad while Aditya Music bagged the audio rights for this film. The song "Assalaam Valekum" is based on "Kozhi Veda Kozhi" from Unakkum Enakkum.

=== Track list ===
No.	Title	Lyrics	Singer(s)	Length
1.	"Siva Sambho"	Chandrabose	Devi Sri Prasad	4:40
2.	"Chandrakala"	Ramajogayya Sastry	Hariharan, Rita	4:13
3.	"Pilla Navalla Kadu"	Chandrabose	Mika Singh, Suchitra	4:47
4.	"Neethone"	Kula Shekar	Kunal Ganjawala, Shreya Ghoshal	3:50
5.	"Chary"	Ramajogayya Sastry	N. T. Rama Rao Jr., Rita	4:48
6.	"Assalaam Valekum"	Ramajogayya Sastry	Baba Sehgal, Priya Hemesh	5:07
7.	"Siva Sambho (The DSP Mix)"	Chandra Bose	Devi Sri Prasad	4:03
Total length:				31:31

== Reception ==
Rediff gave four stars and said, "Brahmanandam is hilarious. Performance-wise, NTR takes the cake. He is simply marvellous as Chari, the Brahmin spouting loud dialogues while his Narasimha is tough yet more sober. NTR presents the contrasts well. All in all, Adhurs is NTR's show all the way!" Sify gave a verdict as "Mass entertainer" and noted, "NTR brings total justice to his dual role as Chari and Narasimha. His characterisation as a Brahmin youth is simply superb and hilarious, but at the same time raking up a controversy with a group of the Brahmins community approaching the State governor Mr. Narasimhan to ban the film. On the other hand, NTR's role as Narasimha as the rugged guy would work well with the mass audience. Nayanthara and Sheela provide the glam quotient while Brahmanandam is hilarious as Bhattu, receiving a big footage which runs into nearly 40 minutes in the film." The Hindu gave a mixed review stating, Ashish Vidyarthi "NTR in two roles is pretty easy with the diction. His dances are amazing and accord the 'mass kick' in the title song that comes before the climax. The humour component is adequately handled by Brahmanandam who hogs the limelight as a Hindu priest."
