= Student No: 1 =

2001 film by S. S. Rajamouli

- Film poster
- Directed by: S. S. Rajamouli; K. Raghavendra Rao (supervision)
- Written by: Story: Pruthvi Teja; Screenplay: K. Raghavendra Rao; Dialogues: Pruthvi Teja–Viswanth
- Produced by: K. Raghavendra Rao; C. Aswani Dutt (presenter)
- Starring: N. T. Rama Rao Jr. Gajala; Rajeev Kanakala
- Cinematography: Hari Anumolu
- Edited by: Kotagiri Venkateswara Rao
- Music by: M. M. Keeravani
- Production company: Swapna Cinema
- Release date: 27 September 2001
- Running time: 148 minutes
- Country: India
- Language: Telugu
- Budget: ₹1.8 crore
- Box office: ₹12 crores distributors' share

Student No: 1 is a 2001 Indian Telugu-language coming-of-age romantic drama film directed by S. S. Rajamouli, marking his feature film directorial debut. Produced and written by K. Raghavendra Rao, based on a story by Pruthvi Teja, and dialogues by Pruthvi Teja and Viswanth. The film's music is composed by M. M. Keeravani. The film stars N. T. Rama Rao Jr., Gajala and Rajeev Kanakala. The film follows Aditya (N. T. Rama Rao Jr.), a mysterious man who joins a law college. He faces numerous hurdles while trying to reform the unruly students, all while grappling with a terrifying past.

Student No: 1 released on 27 September 2001 to critical acclaim and went on to become a commercial success at the box office with a distributors' share of ₹12 crore. The film was later remade in Tamil as Student Number 1 (2003). The title of the 2012 Bollywood film, Student of the Year, was inspired by this film's title.

== Plot ==
Aditya joins a law college in Vizag as a student. The college is notorious for its unruly students headed by Satya. Aditya is shown as a mysterious young man, and throughout the first half, there are flashbacks to his story. He makes the unruly students mend their ways. In the interval, we come to know that Aditya is a criminal facing murder charges and is serving his life term in Vizag central jail. He attends college with the special permission of the jail authorities. Aditya lives in Hyderabad with his parents. He has finished his intermediate studies (10th grade plus 2). He wants to pursue engineering, but his father wants him to study law. This presents a tension between them, leading to a confrontation. Meanwhile, Aditya unintentionally murders a goon while saving a girl from getting raped. Scared of losing face in society, Aditya's father disowns him as his son, and Aditya surrenders at a police station. The rest of the film is how Aditya wins his father's heart with the law degree he earns.

== Cast ==
- N. T. Rama Rao Jr. as R. Aditya
- Malladi Raghava as Raghava Rao, Aditya's father
- Gajala as Anjali (voice dubbed by Savitha Reddy)
- Rajiv Kanakala as Sathya
- Kota Srinivasa Rao as Samba Sivam a.k.a. "Leakage" Sambayya
- Swathi as Aditya's sister
- Brahmanandam as Dr. Brahmanandam
- Ali as Engineer Ali
- Tanikella Bharani as Jailor
- Sudha as Aditya's mother
- M. S. Narayana as Law college lecturer
- Gundu Sudarshan
- Ajay as Satya's batchmate
- Sekhar as a goon
- Preeti Nigam as a lecturer
- L. B. Sriram as Hostel chef
- Sameer as Police officer
- Ananth as Samba Sivam's assistant
- Raghunatha Reddy as Samba Sivam's lawyer
- Sivannarayana Naripeddi

== Soundtrack ==
Student No 1

Soundtrack album by M. M. Keeravani
- Released: 27 September 2001
- Recorded: 2001
- Genre: Feature film soundtrack
- Length: 28:30
- Language: Telugu
- Label: Aditya Music
- Producer: M. M. Keeravani

M. M. Keeravani chronology
| Bava Nachadu (2001) | Student No 1 (2001) | Akasa Veedhilo (2001) |

The music was composed by M. M. Keeravani and released by Aditya Music. Part of the song "Kuchipudi Kaina" is based on "Kurukku Siruthavaley" from Mudhalvan.

All tracks are written by Chandrabose.

Track list
| No. | Title | Singer(s) | Length |
|---|---|---|---|
| 1. | "Koochipudi Kaina" | Tippu | 4:12 |
| 2. | "Kaastha Ninnu" | S. P. Balasubrahmanyam, K. S. Chithra | 4:41 |
| 3. | "Okariki Okarai" | KK, Srivarthini | 4:30 |
| 4. | "Paddanandi Premalo" | Udit Narayan, K. S. Chithra | 4:39 |
| 5. | "Ekkado Putti" | M. M. Keeravani | 5:17 |
| 6. | "Yemetti Chesado" | Udit Narayan, K. S. Chithra | 5:11 |
| Total length: | | | 28:30 |

== Release ==
The film was released with 40 prints.

== Box office ==
Student No: 1 was sold at a price of ₹2.75 crore and collected a share of ₹12 crore. It had a 50-day run in 73 centres. This movie had a 100-day run in 42 centres.

== Awards ==
- M. M. Keeravani won Nandi Award for Best Male Playback Singer for the song "Ekkado Putti"
