= Aadhi (2002 film) =

- Poster
- Directed by: V. V. Vinayak
- Screenplay by: V. V. Vinayak
- Dialogues by: Paruchuri Brothers
- Story by: V. V. Vinayak
- Produced by: Bellamkonda Suresh
- Starring: N. T. Rama Rao Jr. Keerti Chawla; Rajan P. Dev
- Cinematography: C. Ramprasad
- Edited by: Gautham Raju
- Music by: Mani Sharma
- Production company: Sri Laxmi Narasimha Productions
- Release date: 28 March 2002
- Running time: 162 minutes
- Country: India
- Language: Telugu
- Box office: 35.9 Cr gross ₹25.2 crore distributors' share

Aadhi is a 2002 Indian Telugu-language action drama film written and directed by debutant V. V. Vinayak. The film stars N. T. Rama Rao Jr., Keerthi Chawla and Rajan P. Dev. The film follows a young man who returns to his ancestral Rayalaseema village to avenge his parents' murder, confronting a ruthless faction leader who has terrorised the region for decades.

Aadhi was a blockbuster at the box office, collecting a distributor's share of ₹18.2 crore and emerging as one of the most successful Telugu films of the year. Rama Rao Jr. was 19 years old during the film's release, making him one of the youngest actors in Indian cinema to lead a commercial blockbuster. The film established Rama Rao Jr. as a star in Telugu cinema. The film was remade in Tamil as Jai, and in Bengali as Surya. The film won four Nandi Awards.

== Plot ==
The story is set against the backdrop of Rayalaseema. The film opens with Veera Reddy returning from the US after a long gap with his wife and eight-year-old son, Aadhi Kesava Reddy. Veera Reddy's deceased father was a well-known factionist in that area and owned a property of 4,000 acres (16 km^{2}). While leaving for the US, Veera Reddy gave the responsibility of managing this land to Nagi Reddy. Now back in India, Veera Reddy realizes that Nagi Reddy is misusing his power. He wants to donate all his land to the 2000 families staying in that village. When Nagi Reddy learns of this charity giveaway, he attacks Veera Reddy, killing him and his wife. Veeranna, a trusted lieutenant of Veera Reddy, takes the child Aadhi and escapes to Hyderabad. After the murders, Veera Reddy's trusted people are sentenced to fourteen years in prison.

Then the film titles roll, ending with the caption '12 years later'. The grown up Aadhi is studying in college. He falls in love with Nandu and vice versa. Veeranna has raised Aadhi in Hyderabad as a fun-loving boy, but he is also a hot-tempered young man. Later on, it is revealed that Nandu is Nagi Reddy's daughter. Completing her studies, Nandu returns to her hometown at her father's place. After a hiatus of 14 years, Aadgi reenters the Rayalaseema along with other trusted members of his father, who are released from jail. Aadhi wants to take revenge on Nagi Reddy and get back all the land so that he can distribute it to the villagers. The rest of the film deals with how Aadhi achieves his objective.

== Cast ==
- N. T. Rama Rao Jr. as Aadhi Kesava Reddy
- Keerti Chawla as Nandu
- Ahuti Prasad as Veera Reddy
- Chalapathi Rao as Veeranna “Babai”
- Rajan P. Dev as Nagi Reddy
- Ali
- L. B. Sriram as College Principal
- M.S. Narayana as Nagi Reddy's assistant
- Rajiv Kanakala as Rajiv
- Raghu Karumanchi as Simhadri
- Venu Madhav
- Chitram Srinu
- Raghu Babu as Gangi Reddy
- Fish Venkat
- Karate Kalyani
- Ramya Sri in a guest role

== Production ==
When Vinayak was assisting director Sagar for the film Padutha Theeyaga, producer Bellamkonda Suresh used to observe him. He promised him that he would give Vinayak an opportunity to prove himself. After Paaduthaa Theeyaga, he was not doing much as an assistant and thus started working on his own scripts. When Suresh offered to make a film with him, he was thrilled and narrated the story to N. T. Rama Rao Jr., who liked the subject. It was a love story, but prospective producer Kodali Nani didn't like it.

After a couple of days, he narrated another story that was instantly liked and taken to the sets, and that was the story of Aadhi. They went to Mumbai to search for a heroine. They considered Aarti Agarwal, but she had just signed on the dotted line for Nuvvu Naaku Nachav. They also considered Ayesha Takia, but their cameraman felt that she wasn't the right choice for NTR. Seeing the Fair & Lovely ad, Vinayak felt Trisha would be an ideal choice, but his sister didn't like her. They dropped that idea, too, with a primary belief that if ladies didn't like much, then it will just not work out. While in Mumbai still, they also met Sada also there, but she'd have been so lean beside NTR, they thought, and we dropped her too. The shooting was already in progress before the heroine was chosen.

== Soundtrack ==
The music was composed by Mani Sharma and released by Aditya Music. The song “Chikki Chikki” was lifted from the Turkish song Şımarık sung by Tarkan.

Aadhi

Soundtrack album by Mani Sharma
- Released: 2002
- Recorded: 2002
- Genre: Soundtrack
- Length: 27:18
- Label: Aditya Music
- Producer: Mani Sharma

Mani Sharma chronology
Takkari Donga (2002)	Aadhi (2002)	Priyadarshini (2002)

Track list
No.	Title	Lyrics	Singer(s)	Length
1.	"Ayyo Rama"	Bhuvana Chandra	S. P. Balasubrahmanyam, Gopika Poornima	4:40
2.	"Sunnunda"	Chandrabose	Murali, Radhika	4:39
3.	"Tholi Pilupey"	Chandrabose	S. P. Balasubrahmanyam, K. S. Chithra	4:16
4.	"Nee Navvula"	Chandrabose	Mallikarjun, Sunitha	4:43
5.	"Chikki Chikki"	Pothula Ravikiran	Tippu	3:56
6.	"Pattu Okato"	Chandrabose	Udit Narayan, Ganga	5:04
Total length:				27:18

== Reception ==
Gudipoodi Srihari of The Hindu wrote that "NTR Jr. is vociferous, forthright and displays good grasp of the subject. This film looks totally different from what he has played so far. Director Vinayak, being the story and screenplay writer himself, presents his subject with utmost care and balance". A critic from Sify wrote that "If you are looking for a masala entertainer, then go for it right away". Jeevi of Idlebrain.com rated the film three-and-a-half out of five and called both halves of the film entertaining and added that "But the climax of the film is weakened with unnecessary extended fights. The story is a routine and predictable one. But it's purely the imagination of the director that saved viewers from getting disoriented". A critic from Full Hyderabad rated the film seven out of ten and wrote that "NTR Jr. deserves kudos for improving in the departments he was lagging behind in. Adding to his repertoire, he has managed to act well, apart from the dances and the fights that he executes impressively enough. Debutante director V V Vinayak has done well to portray the power feuds in Rayalaseema".

== Box office ==
Aadhi ran for 50 days in 121 centers and 100 days in a record 96 direct centers.

== Awards ==
Nandi Awards

- Best First Film of a Director - V. V. Vinayak
- Best Editor - Gowtham Raju
- Special Jury Award - Jr. NTR
- Best Lyricist - Chandrabose
