= Flying Frogs =

Indian film production company

- Industry: Entertainment
- Headquarters: Hyderabad, India
- Key people: Ravi Babu Rithvik Thammareddy
- Products: Films
- Owner: Ravi Babu

Flying Frogs is an Indian film production company based on Hyderabad, Telangana, produces Telugu films. Founded by actor and producer Ravi Babu.

Known for the indie-unique blend of filmmaking, Ravi Babu grew Flying Frogs into one of Tollywood's established film production houses. With the first hit coming from the movie "Allari" starring actor Naresh, who became synonymous with the movie and earned the nickname "Allari Naresh"

Over the years Flying Frogs has closely collaborated with the late Ramoji Rao's ETV, and also on multiple projects with prominent producer Mr. Suresh Daggubati ( CEO, Suresh Productions).

In 2026, Ravi Babu's son, Rithvik Thammareddy joined the production unit as a producer on the action film "Razor" which was theatrically distributed by Suresh Productions.

== Film production ==
Year	Title	Director	Notes
2002	Allari	Ravi Babu	
2005	Soggadu	Ravi Babu	Co-production with Suresh Productions
2006	Party	Ravi Babu	Co-production with Fresh Water Entertainments
2007	Anasuya	Ravi Babu	
2008	Nacchavule	Ravi Babu	Co-production with Usha Kiran Movies
2012	Avunu	Ravi Babu	
2015	Avunu 2	Ravi Babu	Co-production with Suresh Productions
2018	Adhugo	Ravi Babu	Co-production with Suresh Productions
2019	Aaviri	Ravi Babu	
2020	Crrush	Ravi Babu	
2023	Asalu	Uday–Suresh	Produced by Flying Frogs for ETV Win (Original)
2024	Rush	Satish Poloju	Produced by Flying Frogs for ETV Win ( Original)
2026	Razor	Ravi Babu	Produced by Flying Frogs, Distributed by Suresh Productions
