= Anasuya (film) =

2007 Telugu film by Ravi Babu

- Directed by: Ravi Babu
- Screenplay by: Paruchuri brothers
- Story by: Ravi Babu
- Dialogues by: Nivas
- Produced by: Ravi Babu
- Starring: Bhumika; Abbas; Ravi Babu; Nikita; Ankitha
- Cinematography: N. Sudhakar Reddy
- Edited by: Marthand K. Venkatesh
- Music by: Shekar Chandra
- Production company: Flying Frogs
- Release date: 21 December 2007
- Country: India
- Language: Telugu

Anasuya is a 2007 Indian Telugu-language thriller film directed and produced by Ravi Babu. The film stars Bhumika as the titular character, while Ravi Babu, Abbas, and Nikita play supporting roles. The music was composed by Shekar Chandra with cinematography by N. Sudhakar Reddy and editing by Marthand K. Venkatesh. The film follows the story of a passionate journalist who becomes involved in a series of murders while uncovering a dark conspiracy.

The film released on 21 December 2007. It was remade in Kannada as Anu (2009).

== Plot ==
Anasuya, an orphan with a postgraduate degree in criminal psychology, begins her career at NTV as a reporter. She lives with her elderly landlord, Joseph, and embarks on her first major assignment, which involves exposing child labour in a local politician's household. Disguised as a reporter for a women's magazine, Anasuya uncovers the harsh conditions of an orphan girl, Lakshmi, who is forced into domestic work at the politician's house. After the exposé garners significant attention, the politician retaliates by throwing Lakshmi out to avoid arrest. Anasuya offers shelter to Lakshmi, gaining fame and admiration from her boss but creating tension with her senior colleagues.

Meanwhile, a series of gruesome murders baffles the police. The killer removes organs from his victims and leaves a red rose at the crime scenes. Anasuya, assigned to gather information from task force officer Anand, becomes personally involved in the investigation. The killer targets Joseph, murdering him and removing his heart. He then attempts to kill Anasuya, but she narrowly escapes with Lakshmi. Anasuya's investigation leads her to Govind, a hospital compounder with polio, who is arrested but later released due to his disability. Suspecting Govind's involvement, Anasuya continues her pursuit and uncovers that Govind is pretending to be disabled.

Govind escapes custody and resumes his killings, now targeting organ transplant recipients from the National Hospital. Anasuya connects the murders to a woman named Pooja, whose organs were donated after she was declared brain-dead. Through her investigation, Anasuya uncovers Pooja's tragic past, including her harassment by anatomy professor Dr. Amar, who became obsessed with her. After Pooja rejected his advances and refused to marry him, Amar's actions led to her death. Her organs were donated, and Amar, now known as Govind, preserved her body. He began murdering organ recipients to "reunite" Pooja's organs with her body, believing that she could not be reborn if her organs were donated.

In a final, desperate attempt to complete his obsession, Govind kidnaps Lakshmi, intending to remove her eye to complete Pooja's body. He plans to burn himself with her corpse on Akshaya Tritiya, believing they will be "reborn" together. Anasuya, with Anand's help, tracks Govind to his hideout. In the ensuing confrontation, a fire destroys Pooja's remains. Anasuya fatally wounds Govind, who dies heartbroken.

In the aftermath, Anasuya clears her name and uses her platform as a journalist to promote organ donation while discouraging obsessive and harmful behaviour.

== Cast ==
- Bhumika as Anasuya
- Ravi Babu as "Gulabi Puvvu" Govind / Dr.Amar
- Abbas as Anand
- Harsha Vardhan as Harsha
- Nikita as Pooja
- Suhani
- Shankar Melkote as Uncle Joseph Kurien
- Ankitha as Tulasi
- Sudeepa Pinky
- Chalapathi Rao as Dr. Mohan Das
- Sameer Hasan as Chakravarthy, NTV's senior news reporter
- Baby Neha as Lakshmi, Pooja's eye recipient
- Swathi Katrapati as Kitti, Ntv’s news Reporter and Anasuya's friend
- Sandhya Janak as Pooja's mother
- Natanya Singh as Item Girl
- Pavala Syamala as Nirmalamma

== Production ==
Actor-turned-director Ravi Babu written the script of Anasuya and he clubbed his basic plot of organ donation and serial killer murders to the Psycho killer novel Sanivaaram Nadi by Malladi Venkata Krishna Murthy that contains Male Journalist and Lady Police officer capturing serial killer by sting operation. Ravibabu reversed the roles to male police officer and female journalist. He took the rights of the novel and produced this film on his own in the banner of Flying Frogs with the collaboration of Suresh Productions company.

== Music ==
Anasuya

Soundtrack album by Shekar Chandra
- Released: 2007
- Recorded: 2007
- Genre: Soundtrack
- Length: 4:14
- Producer: Shekar Chandra

Shekar Chandra chronology
Anasuya (2007)	Nachavule (2008)

The music was composed by debutant Shekar Chandra. The song "Ye Theega Poovuno" from Maro Charitra (1978) was used in the film.

Track List
No.	Title	Lyrics	Singer(s)	Length
1.	"Aakasam Merisenu"	Bhaskarabhatla Ravi Kumar	Venugopal	4:14
Total length:				4:14

== Reception ==
The film received positive reviews upon release and was a box office hit, running for 50 days.

A critic for Rediff.com wrote, "On the whole, the attempt is sincere but Anasuya may not enthuse the lovers of formula flicks even though it provides a good respite from such films".

Jeevi of Idlebrain.com rated the film 3/5, praising the performances, particularly Bhumika's portrayal of Anasuya, and the adequate technical aspects. He added, "Overall, Anasuya is a unique film in the thriller genre and will appeal to those who enjoy such films."

== Awards ==
N. Sudhakar Reddy won the Nandi Special Jury Award for cinematography for the film.
