= Satyanand (writer) =

Indian screenwriter

- Born: Pydipalli Satyanand
- Years active: 1973–present
- Known for: Screenwriter
- Parents: Hanumantha Rao (father); Venkataratnamma (mother)
- Relatives: Adurthi Subba Rao (maternal uncle)

Pydipalli Satyanand is an Indian film writer known for his work in Telugu cinema. Over a career spanning five decades, he worked on over 400 films as a story writer, screenplay writer, and dialogue writer. He began his screenwriting career with Mayadari Malligadu (1973), after being encouraged by his maternal uncle, director Adurthi Subba Rao, to transition from assistant directing to writing. Satyanand collaborated with leading actors of Telugu cinema, including N. T. Rama Rao, Akkineni Nageswara Rao, Krishna, Chiranjeevi, Nandamuri Balakrishna, and Pawan Kalyan, achieving significant success with his scripts.

== Career ==
Paidipalli Satyanand was born to Hanumantha Rao and Venkataratnamma. He is the nephew of director Adurthi Subba Rao. He started his career as an assistant director for the film Maayadaari Malligadu (1973), which was directed by Subba Rao. Impressed by Satyanand's potential, Subba Rao encouraged him to transition from assistant directing to screenwriting, giving him his first opportunity to write dialogues for the film.

Satyanand's career took off with the success of Maayadaari Malligadu, leading him to write scripts for over 400 films. His collaborations with directors K. Raghavendra Rao and Kodandarami Reddy were crucial to his success, working on 45 films with Raghavendra Rao and 20 with Kodandarami Reddy. An early highlight of his career was Jyothi (1976), which helped solidify his partnership with Raghavendra Rao and marked a key point in his rise as a screenwriter.

Among Satyanand's notable works are Kondaveeti Simham (1981), and Justice Chowdary (1982). In Justice Chowdary, Satyanand wrote the story, screenplay, and dialogues, creating a dual role for N. T. Rama Rao. The film was a major hit and praised by Rama Rao for its mass appeal. He also wrote Pelli Sandhadi, a low-budget film that became a trendsetter in Telugu cinema, known for its simple yet captivating plot twist.

Satyanand made his directorial debut with the film Jhansi Rani, based on the novel Mr. V by Malladi Venkata Krishnamurthy. Despite the film's critical acclaim, it did not achieve commercial success. At the time, actor Rajendra Prasad had recently become popular as a comedy star with the release of Ladies Tailor. However, in Jhansi Rani, he played a negative role, which did not resonate well with audiences expecting a comedic performance. Although the film earned praise, Satyanand chose not to pursue further directorial projects despite offers from producers.

Throughout his career, Satyanand maintained a close working relationship with fellow writer Jandhyala. They collaborated on ten films, sharing ideas and scripts, showcasing a productive partnership within the industry.

== Influence ==
Satyanand has expressed admiration for the dialogues of Aatreya and the humour of Mullapudi Venkata Ramana and Bhamidipati Radhakrishna Murthy from the generation before him. Among his contemporaries, he has shown appreciation for the work of Jandhyala and the Paruchuri brothers. Regarding the next generation of writers, he holds Trivikram Srinivas in high regard, considering him a standout talent in modern screenwriting.

== Filmography ==
Year	Film	Credit	Ref.
1973	Mayadari Malligadu	Dialogues	
1976	Jyothi	Dialogues	
1977	Ardhangi	Dialogues	
1977	Edurinta	Dialogues	
1977	Bratuke Oka Pandaga	Story, Dialogues	
1978	Kaliyuga Stree	Dialogues	
1979	Kothala Rayudu	Dialogues	
1980	Chandipriya	Dialogues	
1980	Mogudu Kavali		
1981	Kondaveeti Simham	Story, Dialogues	
1981	Devudu Mamayya	Dialogues	
1981	Nyayam Kavali	Dialogues	
1982	Justice Chowdary	Story	
1984	Iddaru Dongalu	Story	
1985	Adivi Raja	Dialogues	
1986	Chadastapu Mogudu	Dialogues	
1987	Ajeyudu	Dialogues	
1987	Donga Mogudu		
1988	Jhansi Rani	Direction	
1990	Maa Inti Maharaju	Dialogues	
1988	Yamudiki Mogudu	Story	
1989	Adavilo Abhimanyudu	Dialogues, Screenplay	
1989	Attaku Yamudu Ammayiki Mogudu	Story	
1990	Kodama Simham	Dialogues	
1990	Sahasaputrudu	Dialogues	
1991	Kshana Kshanam	Dialogues	
1992	420	Dialogues	
1996	Pelli Sandadi	Story, Dialogues	
1997	Chinnabbayi	Dialogues	
2001	Preminchi	Story	
2002	Takkari Donga	Story, Dialogues	
2003	Dhanush	Dialogues	
2003	Jaani	Dialogues	
2004	Anji	Story	
2006	Party	Screenplay	
2007	Madhumasam	Dialogues	
2008	Kousalya Supraja Rama	Dialogues	
2008	Nachavule	Screenplay	
2009	Amaravathi	Screenplay	
2010	Manasara	Screenplay	
2013	Nenem..Chinna Pillana..?	Dialogues	
2014	Laddu Babu	Screenplay	
2016	Soggade Chinni Nayana	Screenplay	
2019	Aaviri	Screenplay	

Producer

- Allari Premikudu (1994)

== Awards ==
Year	Award	Category	Film	Result	Ref.
1989	Nandi Awards	Best Screenplay Writer	Adavilo Abhimanyu	Won	

== See also ==
- List of Indian writers
- List of people from Andhra Pradesh
- Lists of screenwriters
