= Tholi Choopulone =

2003 film directed by Kasi Viswanath

- Poster
- Directed by: Kasi Viswanath
- Written by: Paruchuri Brothers (dialogues)
- Story by: Kasi Viswanath
- Produced by: Ramoji Rao
- Starring: Kalyan Ram; Akanksha; Suman
- Cinematography: Sekhar V. Joseph
- Edited by: Marthand K. Venkatesh
- Music by: Chakri
- Production company: Usha Kiran Movies
- Release date: 9 October 2003
- Country: India
- Language: Telugu

Tholi Choopulone (transl. From the first sight) is a 2003 Indian Telugu-language romance film directed by Kasi Viswanath and produced by Ramoji Rao. The film stars newcomers Kalyan Ram and Akanksha in the lead roles, while Suman plays a pivotal role. The film's music was composed by Chakri. This film marked the entry of Kalyan Ram into Telugu cinema as a lead actor and was Ramoji Rao's 75th film as a producer.

== Cast ==
- Kalyan Ram as Raju
- Akanksha as Bhanu
- Suman as Srikar Prasad, Bhanu's father
- Sarada
- Sudeepa
- Kalpana
- Charan Raj
- Sunil as White and White Simhachalam, Raju's friend
- Surya
- MS Narayana
- Brahmanandam
- LB Sreeram
- Venu Madhav
- Ironleg Sastry
- Bhagawan
- Aanand Vardhan
- Ahuti Prasad
- Raghu Babu
- Ravi Babu
- Telangana Shakuntala as a railway ticket collector
- Vajja Venkata Giridhar

== Production ==
The film's title was named after a song from Justice Chaudhary featuring N. T. Ramarao.

== Soundtrack ==
The music for the film was composed by Chakri. The audio was launched at Usha Mayuri theatre. For the audio release function, producer D. Ramanaidu was the chief guest. Actor Venkatesh and director S. V. Krishna Reddy were also present.

Toli Choopulone

Soundtrack album by Chakri
- Released: 18 September 2003
- Recorded: 2003
- Genre: Soundtrack
- Producer: Chakri

Chakri chronology
Satyam (2003)	Toli Choopulone (2003)	Andhrawala (2003)

Track list
No.	Title	Lyrics	Singer(s)	Length
1.	"Suklam Bharadaram"	Bandaru Danayya	Udit Narayan, Shreya Ghoshal
2.	"Pagadala Pedavipai"	Chinni Charan	Rajesh, Harini
3.	"Hello Ammai"	Bhuvana Chandra	Udit Narayan, Shreya Ghoshal
4.	"Sakhia Sakhia"	Kandikonda	Shankar Mahadevan, Kousalya
5.	"Kannulu Mooste"	Surya Kumari	Chakri, Kousalya
6.	"Echecha"	Bhaskarabhatla	Shankar Mahadevan

== Reception ==
A critic from The Hindu opined, "The director has nothing new to offer as the film unfolds on predictable lines". A critic from Sify wrote, "Toli Choopulone is a letdown. This banal love story has not been worked out properly. Added to that the lead pair Kalyan Ram and Akansha are total disasters, as they cannot emote". However, Jeevi of Idlebrain.com gave the film a rating of three out of five stars and praised Kalyan Ram's performance and the comedy. Telugu Cinema wrote "[...] Tholichoopulone is weak in all the technical aspects and the hero, heroines' performance is just average. First half of the movie is OK with comedy and characters establishment. But the second half of the film is not that interesting. Sunil's comedy is the only entertainment of the movie".
