= Allari Subhashini =

Indian actress

- Born: Tirumala Subhashini; Bhimavaram, West Godavari district, Andhra Pradesh
- Occupation: Actress
- Years active: 2002 – present

Allari Subhashini (born Tirumala Subhashini) is an Indian actress predominantly appears in Telugu films and TV serials. She plays supporting roles.

== Personal life ==
She hails from Bhimavaram, Andhra Pradesh. She lost her father when she was attending school. She studied up to 7th standard. After that she got married at a very young age. She has a sister. She was a stage artist from her childhood.

== Career ==
When she visited Hyderabad for a stage drama called Chintamani, actor Chalapati Rao advised her to approach his son Ravi Babu who was making a debut film called Allari. He offered her a role in that film. Her debut film gave her good recognition. Later she changed her name to Allari Subhashini. She received many offers after that. She played significant roles in Sri Anjaneyam directed by Krishna Vamsi. She went on to act with stars like Balakrishna, NTR, Nagarjuna, Chiranjeevi, and Rajinikanth.

== Partial filmography ==
- Allari (2002)
- Chennakesava Reddy (2002)
- Eeswar (2002)
- Sri Anjaneyam (2004)
- Andagadu (2005)
- Kanchanamala Cable TV (2005)
- Kithakithalu (2006)
- Tata Birla Madhyalo Laila (2006)
- Samanyudu (2006)
- Allare Allari (2007)
- Satyabhama (2007) as Restaurant manager
- Nee Sukhame Ne Koruthunna (2008)
- John Apparao 40 Plus (2008)
- Nachavule (2008)
- Bendu Apparao R.M.P (2009)
- Ninnu Kalisaka (2009)
- Amaravathi (2009)
- Parama Veera Chakra (2011)
- Money Money, More Money (2011)
- Aakasame Haddu (2011)
- Sudigadu (2012)
- Chammak Challo (2013)
- Surya vs Surya (2015)
- Guntur Talkies (2016)
- Parvathipuram (2016) as Ranganayaki
- Konda Polam (2021)
