= Amaravathi (2009 film) =

2009 Telugu film directed by Ravi Babu

- Directed by: Ravi Babu
- Screenplay by: Satyanand
- Story by: Ravi Babu
- Produced by: Ananda Prasad
- Dialogues by: Nivas
- Starring: Taraka Ratna; Ravi Babu; Bhumika; Sneha; Sindhura Gadde
- Cinematography: N. Sudhakar Reddy
- Music by: Shekar Chandra
- Production company: Bhavya Creations
- Release date: 3 December 2009
- Country: India
- Language: Telugu

Amaravathi is a 2009 Indian Telugu-language slasher film written and directed by Ravi Babu. The film stars Taraka Ratna, Ravi Babu, Bhumika, Sneha, and Sindhura Gadde in pivotal roles. The film was released on 3 December 2009. It is based on the 2002 South Korean film H. The film won two Nandi Awards: Best Villain (Taraka Ratna) and Best Cinematographer (Sudhakar Reddy)

== Plot ==
In 1995, in the village of Muthyalarevu, a bond develops between Sreenu, the son of a maidservant, and Amaravathi, the daughter of the landlord. However, Sreenu's twisted love for Amaravathi leads to a confrontation. One day, after a playful encounter, the landlord becomes enraged, slits Sreenu's throat, and disposes of his body in a river. Sreenu is later found by a hypnotist who saves his life, revives him, and teaches him the art of hypnosis.

In the present, a series of gruesome crimes baffle the police, where a sadistic individual is kidnapping babies from pregnant women and leaving them to die. Task force officer Venkat is brought out of a sabbatical to solve the case. He apprehends the culprit, but the crimes continue despite the culprit being behind bars. Later, Venkat's investigation uncovers the truth: the criminal is Sreenu, and his past is revealed.

In the flashback, after being saved by the hypnotist who finds him by the river, Sreenu undergoes treatment and learns hypnosis from him. Using these newfound skills, Sreenu attempts to win back Amaravathi. However, during this process, he accidentally harms one of the hypnotist's assistants, causing serious injuries. Sreenu then escapes and returns to his village, where he learns that his childhood friend is now married and settled in Hyderabad.

Sreenu then seeks revenge on the landlord who caused his separation from Amaravathi. He hypnotises and kills the landlord. Returning to Amaravathi's home, he observes her close relationship with her husband. Unable to bear it, Sreenu murders her husband in their bathroom. Amaravathi, discovering her husband's body, inadvertently steps on the rod used in the murder, leading to a head injury that causes a miscarriage and leaves her mentally unstable. She later asks Sreenu to find her ten children, and Sreenu agrees, marrying her in the process.

In the present day, Venkat discovers that the crimes were orchestrated by the task force members who were working to apprehend the culprit, all of whom were hypnotised. As Venkat completes his investigation, Sreenu escapes from prison. Venkat deduces that Sreenu wanted ten babies to complete his mission but was one short. Venkat is determined to save the baby and mother from Sreenu, eventually discovering that the tenth baby Sreenu sought was that of Venkat's pregnant wife.

Sreenu is collecting the ten babies for Amaravathi, who has an obsession with having everything in tens. She desperately wants ten children but is unable to conceive. To fulfill her wish, Sreenu kidnaps the daughter of a doctor and blackmails her into implanting her fetus into ten women who seek to conceive. Once the work is done, Sreenu hypnotises the woman and forces her to commit suicide.

Meanwhile, Venkat mysteriously disappears. His colleagues are shocked to find that Sreenu has hypnotised Venkat, using him as his delivery man. Venkat is manipulated into taking his wife to Sreenu's hideout on the outskirts of the city. There, Sreenu and his accomplice begin to extract the baby from her womb. Just in time, the task force arrives and neutralises the situation, returning Venkat to normal.

Enraged by the truth, Venkat engages in a physical fight with Sreenu, eventually defeating him. The task force kills Amaravathi's caretaker and retrieves all the babies. Sreenu, realising the extent of his guilt, hands a loaded pistol to Amaravathi, asking her to end his life. She does so, killing him.

Venkat administers an antidote, prescribed by his wife’s personal doctor, which saves both his wife and their baby. A colleague suggests that the babies technically belong to Amaravathi and Sreenu, but Venkat objects, ordering that they be returned to their rightful mothers. The film concludes with Venkat looking lovingly at his wife, who is content as she gazes at their baby.

== Cast ==
- Taraka Ratna as Srinu
- Ravi Babu as Venkat
- Bhumika as Amaravathi
- Sneha as Latha Venkat
- Sindhura Gadde as Kiran
- Yadagiri Rodda as Lawyer
- Allari Subhashini as Srinu's trusted aid
- Kota Srinivasa Rao as Dr. Sebastian
- Madhusudhan Rao as Amaravathi's father
- Y. Kasi Viswanath as Viswanath, Dr. Sebastian's Assistant
- Paruchuri Gopala Krishna as Hypnotist
- Ravi Prakash as Amaravathi's husband
- Raja Ravindra
- C. V. L. Narasimha Rao

== Reception ==
Hemanth of 123Telugu.com rated the film 3/5 and praised its engaging storyline, strong performances by Ravi Babu and Taraka Ratna, and technical excellence, though noting its disturbing content and niche appeal. Jeevi of Idlebrain.com rated the film 2.5/5 and stated that Amaravathi has a limited appeal, with an interesting story but a screenplay that loses its impact during translation, making it suitable for a niche audience.

== Awards ==
Nandi Awards

- Nandi Award for Best Villain - Taraka Ratna
- Nandi Award for Best Cinematographer - Sudhakar Reddy

== See also ==
- Telugu films of 2009
