= Pavala Syamala =

Indian actress (1951–2026)

- Born: Nethi Syamala; 1951; Amaravati, Madras State, India
- Died: 28 July 2026 (aged 74–75); Hyderabad, Telangana, India
- Occupation: Actress
- Years active: 1984–2026

Pavala Syamala (born Nethi Syamala; 1951 – 28 July 2026) was an Indian actress from Andhra Pradesh. She primarily played supporting roles in Telugu films from 1985. Syamala made her debut in the film Babai Abbai.

== Life and career ==
Nethi Syamala was born in Amaravati, Madras State, India in 1951, into a Brahmin family. She lost her mother as a child. Syamala studied till her 10th standard. She lost her husband after her daughter was born.

She was in financial distress and sought help from donors. Pawan Kalyan reportedly helped her with a sum of Rs.1 Lakh. Telangana Chief minister K. Chandra Sekhar Rao also helped her with an amount of Rs.20,000 immediately, and a monthly pension of Rs.10000. He also promised a two bedroom house from the government side.

Syamala died from a heart attack on 28 July 2026.

== Filmography ==
Year	Film	Role	Notes	Ref.
1984	Challenge			
1984	Srivariki Premalekha			
1985	Babai Abbai	Sundari		
1985	Mogudu Pellalu			
1987	Ida Prapancham			
1987	Maharshi			
1988	Swarnakamalam			
1988	Jeevana Ganga			
1988	Donga Kollu	Shyamala		
1988	Vivaha Bhojanambu	Syamala		
1989	Mouna Poratam			
1990	Karthavyam			
1990	Papa Kosam			
1992	Gang War			
1992	Babai Hotel			
1995	Errodu			
1995	Cheemala Dandu			
1995	Kondapalli Rathaiah			
1998	Cheekati Suryulu			
1998	Suswagatham			
1999	Premaku Velayara			
2000	Kodanda Ramudu			
2001	Dadagiri			
2001	Manasantha Nuvve	Mohan Rao's mother		
2001	Kalisinaduddam			
2002	Allari Ramudu			
2002	2 Much			
2002	Nee Thodu Kavali			
2002	Premalo Pavani Kalyan			
2002	Indra	Bamma		
2002	Seema Simham			
2002	Khadgam	Seethamahalaksmi's mother		
2002	Eeshwar			
2002	Swatantram			
2003	Ninne Istapaddanu			
2003	Dongodu			
2003	Dham	Prashanth's grandmother		
2003	Tagore			
2003	Maa Bapu Bommaku Pellanta			
2004	Andhrawala			
2004	Varsham	Mutyalu		
2004	Arjun			
2004	Gowri			
2005	Nuvvostanante Nenoddantana			
2005	Ayodhya			
2005	Andagadu	Mutyalu		
2005	Modati Cinema			
2006	Kamli	Ayah		
2006	Roommates			
2006	Sri Krishna 2006			
2006	Happy			
2007	Bahumathi			
2007	Aata			
2007	Lakshmi Kalyanam			
2007	Bangaru Kanda			
2007	Vijayadasami			
2007	Maharajasri			
2007	Anasuya	Nirmalamma		
2008	Blade Babji			
2008	Rainbow			
2008	Souryam	Colony Woman		
2008	Baladoor			
2008	John Apparao 40 Plus			
2009	Junction			
2009	Padaharella Vayasu			
2009	Snehituda			
2009	Maska			
2010	Kedi			
2010	Collector Gari Bharya			
2010	Maa Aayana Bangaram			
2010	Dammunodu			
2010	Golimaar	Maid		
2011	Mangala			
2012	Srimannarayana			
2012	Maa Abbayi Engineering Student			
2013	D for Dopidi			
2013	Gurudu			
2014	Chandamama Kathalu			
2014	Emo Gurram Egaravachu			
2014	Galipatam			
2014	Drushyam			
2016	Babu Bangaram			
2016	Guntur Talkies	Giri's mother		
2016	Shourya			
2017	Nenu Local			
2019	Mathu Vadalara	Old woman		
