= Sindhura Gadde =

Indian model and actress

- Born: Vijayawada, Andhra Pradesh, India
- Occupation: Model
- Years active: 2005 - Present
- Spouse: Jonathan Ward (2010 – present)

Sindhura Gadde is an Indian former actress and beauty pageant titleholder who won Femina Miss India World 2005 also made to the semi-finals of Miss World Pageant in 2005.

== Early life ==
Sindhura Gadde was born in Vijayawada, Andhra Pradesh. She was raised by her grandparents in Vijayawada, while her parents were working abroad in New Zealand. When she was 10 years old, she moved to New Zealand. After completing her studies in New Zealand, she started her career in media and fashion industry. She returned to India and completed her double degree in Pharmacology & Physiology and a diploma in modeling. She also took introduction courses in Japanese, Chinese and Arabic.

== Career ==
She was crowned Femina Miss India World in 2005. When asked in the semi-final round which invention they would like to create and why, she replied she wanted to develop a natural remedy for cancer. After winning the contest, she said "she felt on top of the world at winning, and hoped to make India proud globally". Her fashion designer during the contest was Jayaram Ramineni She was 1st runner up at Miss India NZ 2002 and 2nd runner up in Miss Auckland 2002. Since her crowning, she has made several public appearances such as the TANA Conference 2005 in Detroit, Michigan and at the Hindu Samaj Temple in Wappingers Falls, New York. Sindhura made it to the semi-finals in the 2005 Miss World Pageant held in China.

Gadde made her debut in Tollywood in the movie Sangamam opposite Rohit Khurana. The Telugu movie was directed by Rasool Ellore and produced by P Ramana and Gavara Parthasarathy. She also did a bit of role in Heyy Babyy and signed Nagesh Kukunoor's Bemisal, but that film didn't go into production. She then went back to do a Telugu movie Amaravathi with director by Ravi Babu and Killer.

She also continued to host Femina Miss India South for 3 continuous years.

On 4 December 2010, she married her boyfriend of 10 years, Jonathan Ward in New Zealand.

== Filmography ==
Year	Film	Role	Language	Notes
2007	Heyy Babyy	Devika	Hindi	
2008	Sangamam	Sanskruthi	Telugu	
2009	Amaravathi	Kiran	Telugu	
2010	Killer		Telugu	

Preceded by Sayali Bhagat	Miss India World; 2005	Succeeded by Natasha Suri
