= Shh... =

- Film poster
- Directed by: Hari Charan Prasad
- Screenplay by: Hari Charan Prasad
- Based on: A Stir of Echoes by Richard Matheson
- Starring: Shafi; Mithuna; Maadhavi Latha
- Cinematography: Murali Mohan Reddy
- Edited by: Ravindra Babu
- Music by: Score: Sri Vasanth; Songs: Vidya; Swarna
- Production company: Apoorva Chitra
- Release date: 23 January 2009
- Country: India
- Language: Telugu

Shh… Idhi Chaala Manchi Ooru (transl. Shh... This is a good village) is a 2009 Indian Telugu-language thriller film directed by Hari Charan Prasad and starring Shafi, Mithuna and Maadhavi Latha.

== Plot ==
In a village, a girl dies in an accident because of a few foolish youngsters. A doctor and his wife rent out the house in which the girl used to live in.

== Cast ==
- Shafi as the doctor
- Mithuna as the doctor's wife
- Maadhavi Latha as Seeta
- Siva Krishna
- Roopa Devi as the occult practitioner
- Rallapalli

== Production ==
The film was initially supposed to be titled Alajadi but the title rights were held by K. Raghavendra Rao. The title of the film refers to the death of the girl in the story that is unknown to the outside world. This film is produced by Charanaprasad and Sukanya, who earlier produced Kamli (2006). Shafi went to a medical college to prepare for his role. Maadhavi Latha was initially given the role assigned for Mithuna before she requested to change her role. The film was shot in 45 days.

== Soundtrack ==
Sri Vasanth, grandson of Satyam, made his debut as a composer through this film. Vidya and Swarna, each composed a song in the film. All lyrics were written by Veturi.

- "Evaro Evaro" - K. S. Chithra, Karthik, Geetha Madhuri
- "Oohala Pallaki" - K. S. Chithra
- "Theme Music"
- "Theme Music"

== Reception ==
Jeevi of Idlebrain.com rated the film 2.5/5 and wrote, "This kind of story has commercial appeal to it, but the director treated it more like an art film". The film was a box office failure.
