= Pasupuleti =

Pasupuleti (Telugu: పసుపులేటి) is a Telugu surname. It is a common and dominant surname among the Kapu and Naidu castes.

- Pasupuleti Kannamba, Indian actress and playback singer of Telugu cinema
- Pasupuleti Krishna Vamsi, Indian film director
- Pasupuleti Ramesh Naidu, Indian music director
- Pasupuleti Madhavi Latha, Indian actress in Telugu cinema
- Pasupuleti Siva, Indian pharmacist
- Reshma Pasupuleti, Indian actress in Tamil cinema.
- Pasupuleti Praveen Kumar, Chartered accountant from Burripalem/Nutakki
