= Seema Simham =

- Theatrical release poster
- Directed by: G. Ram Prasad
- Written by: Paruchuri Brothers (dialogues)
- Screenplay by: G. Ram Prasad
- Story by: Chinni Krishna
- Produced by: D. V. V. Danayya; J. Bhagavan
- Starring: Nandamuri Balakrishna; Simran; Reema Sen
- Edited by: Kotagiri Venkateswara Rao
- Music by: Mani Sharma
- Production company: Sri Balaji Art Creations
- Release date: 11 January 2002
- Running time: 155 minutes
- Country: India
- Language: Telugu

Seema Simham (transl. Lion from Rayalaseema) is a 2002 Telugu-language action film produced by J. Bhagawan and D. V. V. Danayya under the Sri Balaji Art Creations banner and directed by G. Ram Prasad. It stars Nandamuri Balakrishna, Simran and Reema Sen in the lead roles. The music was composed by Mani Sharma. The film met with mixed reviews from critics and was a failure at the box office. The film was dubbed and released in Tamil as Oh Podu.

== Cast ==
- Nandamuri Bala Krishna as Durga Prasad IPS, and Simha Prasad, the real son of Chandra Shekhar
- Simran as Hema
- Reema Sen as Charulatha / Baby
- Sai Kumar as Simbhu Prasad
- K. Viswanath as Visweswara Rao
- P. Vasu as MP Kaaleswara Rao
- Raghuvaran as Dhanunjaya Rao
- Charan Raj as Chandra Sekhar
- Jaya Prakash Reddy as Kulashekar Rao
- Brahmanandam as Bhadrachalam (servant)
- Tanikella Bharani as Kanakaiyah
- Annapurna as Hema's mother
- Anandaraj as Police Inspector
- Rao Ramesh as Hema's brother
- Narra Venkateswara Rao as Chandra Sekhar's brother-in-law
- Ahuti Prasad as Raghupathi
- Dharmavarapu Subramanyam as Villager
- M. S. Narayana as Snake Man
- Giri Babu as Doctor
- Gundu Hanumantha Rao as Priest
- Chalapathi Rao as Chalapeswara Rao
- Ranganath as I. G.
- Mohan Raj as Kaaleswara Rao's brother
- G. V. Sudhakar Naidu as Kaaleswara Rao's henchman
- Sakshi Ranga Rao as School Master
- Sujatha as Lakshmi
- Vennira Aadai Nirmala as Paravathi
- Sangeeta as Bhavani
- L. B. Sriram
- Costume Krishna as Minister Subramanya Sharma
- Raghunatha Reddy as Doctor
- Satya Prakash as Kaaleswara Rao's son
- Ramaraju as Kaaleswara Rao's henchmen
- Gautham Raju as Driver
- Rajitha as Hema's aunty
- Siva Parvathi as Chamundeswari
- Delhi Rajeswari as Doctor
- Varsha
- Alapathi Lakshmi
- Pavala Syamala
- Kalpana Rai
- Master Anand Vardhan
- Karate Kalyani (Uncredited Role)

== Production ==
Three songs were shot at New Zealand. The song "Manchithanam" was shot at Jagadamba center, RK beach and siripuri junction.

== Soundtrack ==
Seema Simham

Film score by Mani Sharma
- Released: 2002
- Genre: Soundtrack
- Length: 29:54
- Label: Aditya Music
- Producer: Mani Sharma

Mani Sharma chronology
| Subbu (2001) | Seema Simham (2002) | Takkari Donga (2002) |

The music composed by Mani Sharma. The audio was launched at Taj Banjara on 26 December 2001.

| No. | Title | Lyrics | Singer(s) | Length |
|---|---|---|---|---|
| 1. | "Manchitanam Intiperu" | Chandrabose | Shankar Mahadevan | 5:05 |
| 2. | "Rendu Jalla Pappa" | Bhuvanachandra | K. S. Chithra, Shankar Mahadevan | 4:09 |
| 3. | "Koka Raika" | Sirivennela Sitarama Sastry | S. P. Balasubrahmanyam, Kavita Subramaniam | 5:23 |
| 4. | "Chandamaama" | Sirivennela Sitarama Sastry | Hariharan, Sujatha | 4:56 |
| 5. | "Pori Husharu" | Srinivas | Mano, Radhika Thilak | 4:52 |
| 6. | "Avvaa Buvvaa" | Srinivas | Udit Narayan, Swarnalatha | 5:29 |
| Total length: | | | | 29:54 |

== Release ==
The film was released on 11 January 2002.

== Reception ==
Idlebrain wrote "Screenplay of the film is bad. Direction is good in patches. There are a few brilliantly executed scenes. But the most of the other scenes in this film lack punch and are dull. Too many characters and too less time taken to establish these characters is the main drawback. The script of the film is loosely executed". Sify wrote "The film is devoid of a coherent script. The director has no clue about the plot and his intention is to splash sauce and gore along with Durga Mata sentiments". Full Hyderabad wrote "Don't get conned, this is not a sequel to Balakrishna's other 'simham' hits, since this one here has nothing to do with borders or lions. The director is the type to drown himself in a carpool and he made the flick for likeminded people". Andhra Today wrote "The movie's grand title purports more in its name than the actual substance it delivers much to the disappointment of the audience. Although Balakrishna gets a role to match his image, the story and screen-play do not measure up to the grandiose title. The story appears even unrelated at places. The director seems to be under the impression that the audience can be floored by the action sequences and scenic picturization of songs". Telugu Cinema wrote "Director Ramprasad has proved that his earlier hit Chirunavvutho made it to the box office, thanks to dialogues, but not because of direction. In Seema Simham there is nothing like direction but for facilitating some rotten scenes in an outdated screenplay to force the story ahead".
