= A Shyam Gopal Varma Film =

- Official poster of the film
- Directed by: C.S. Reddy (Rakesh Srinivas)
- Screenplay by: Rekha Reddy; C.S. Reddy
- Story by: Inspired by a book by Malladi Venkata Krishna Murthy
- Produced by: Rekha Reddy; C.S. Reddy
- Starring: Shafi
- Cinematography: Rahul Shrivatsav
- Edited by: Karthika Srinivas
- Music by: Mantra Anand
- Production company: Samisti Creations
- Release date: 1 January 2015
- Country: India
- Language: Telugu

A Shyam Gopal Varma Film is an Indian 2015 Telugu-language satirical crime comedy film directed by debutante C.S.Reddy alias Rakesh Srinivas, is a satirical crime thriller arguably based on popular Indian film director Ram Gopal Varma. The lead role is played by Shafi. The background score is performed by Mantra Anand, cinematography by Rahul Shrivatsav and editing by Karthika Srinivas.

== Plot ==
When a popular crime film director gets kidnapped, he realizes the plot is thicker than his own films.

== Cast ==
- Shafi as Shyam Gopal Varma
- Zoya Khan
- Shiva Krishna
- LB Sriram
- Jaya Prakash Reddy
- Jeeva
- Telangana Sakunthala
- Prudhvi Raj
- Surya
- Kondavalasa
- Satyam Rajesh
- Narsing Yadav
- Prabhas Sreenu
- Gundu Hanumantha Rao
- Sivannarayana Naripeddi
- Vasu Inturi
- Harish Koyilagndla
- Rajkaran Singh

== Production ==
As of mid-2014, the film's shooting was complete and it was in the post-production phase.

== Reception ==
Ch Sushil Rao of The Times of India rated the film two-and-half out of five stars and commented that it was an "engrossing movie, if you ignore the comedy, which also exposes some truths about the film industry".
