= Soggadu (2005 film) =

2005 Indian film by Ravi Babu

- Directed by: Ravi Babu
- Written by: Nivas (dialogues)
- Screenplay by: Paruchuri Brothers
- Story by: Ravi Babu
- Produced by: D. Suresh; D. Rama Naidu (presents)
- Starring: Tarun; Aarthi Agarwal; Jugal Hansraj
- Cinematography: Loganathan Srinivasan
- Edited by: Anthony
- Music by: Chakri
- Production company: Suresh Productions
- Release date: 31 March 2005
- Running time: 153 minutes
- Country: India
- Language: Telugu

Soggadu (transl. Charmer) is a 2005 Indian Telugu-language romance film produced by D. Suresh on Suresh Productions banner. Directed by Ravi Babu, it stars Tarun and Aarthi Agarwal in lead roles. Venkatesh, Srikanth, Shriya Saran and Sumanth make special appearances. Soggadu won good critical appreciation and technical acclaim for the director Ravi Babu. It was unofficially remade in Hindi as Ajab Prem Ki Ghazab Kahani (2009).

== Plot ==
Ravi, a school dropout and vagabond, falls in love with Swati the minute he sets eyes on her, but loses sight of her in a sea of people and traffic. As only a possessed lover can, he tries to find her in a city of ten million people. Armed with just the first three letters on the license plate of her car, he tries to locate her. After innumerable attempts and near hits and misses, he manages to find her. Swati lived under the shadow of a tyrannical brother who was trying find her an arranged marriage. Ravi manages to establish visual contact with Swati and understands from her mute plea that she wants to leave her home. Ravi helps her escape from home and is elated that she left home for him. His bubble quickly bursts when he learns that Swati had used his help to get to her lover Chandu. Ravi braves the goons who chase them, fights the tears of heartbreak, and decides to help Swati meet her lover. This draws ire from Ravi's friends who had helped him all along in his love story. They think Ravi should dump the girl. He disagrees and they dessert him. Armed only with unflinching, selfless love, Ravi embarks on an adventure with Swati to find her lover, Chandu. Finally, he manages to fight the Swati's brother's goons and unites Swati and Chandu. Ravi's selfless sacrifice melts Swati's heart and causes her to question the meaning of true love.

== Cast ==
- Tarun as Ravi
- Aarthi Agarwal as Swati
- Jugal Hansraj as Chandu
- Kota Srinivasa Rao as Ravi's father
- Kavitha as Ravi's mother
- Brahmanandam
- Ali as Beggar
- Subbaraju as GK, Swati's brother
- Sudeepa Pinky as Ravi's sister
- Gautam Raju as Ravi's uncle
- Krishna Bhagavan as Railway TC
- Raghu Babu as Police Officer
- Gundu Hanumantha Rao as Lecturer Subba Rao
- Vijay Sai as Cable Madhu
- Viswa as Ravi's friend
- M.S. Narayana
- Hema
- Narra Venkateswara Rao
- Jeeva
- Chittajalu Lakshmipati
- Raj Kumar
- Siva
- Santosh
- Charan
- Nuthan Kumar
- Sirisha
- Kavitha Krishnaswamy
- Bangalore Padma
- Jaya Lakshmi
- Kalpana Rai
- Master Karthik
- Master Deepak
- Sanjjana as Anu (uncredited cameo)
- Shriya Saran as Shriya (Cameo)
- Srikanth as himself (special appearance)
- Sunil as Venkat (guest appearance)

== Production ==
Due to false rumors that she was in love with Tarun, Aarthi Agarwal attempted suicide a week before the release of this film.

== Soundtrack ==
Soggadu

Film score by Chakri
- Released: 2005
- Genre: Soundtrack
- Length: 28:02
- Label: Aditya Music
- Producer: Chakri

Chakri chronology
Chakram (2005)	Soggadu (2005)	Bhageeratha (2005)

The music was composed by Chakri. Lyrics written by Bhaskarabhatla. The music was released on the Aditya Music company.

No.	Title	Singer(s)	Length
1.	"Current Shock"	Chakri, Ravi Varma	3:47
2.	"Yepatikappudu"	Chakri, Sudha	3:40
3.	"Premicha Ninne"	Venu, Kousalya	4:59
4.	"Madhumasam"	Chakri	3:55
5.	"Yekkada Vunna"	Karthik, Kousalya	4:11
6.	"Kaliki Chilaka"	Karthik	2:46
7.	"Sneham"	Chakri	1:22
8.	"Kokkorokko"	Tippu, Kavitha Krishnamurthy	3:05
Total length:			28:02

== Reception ==
A critic from Idlebrain.com wrote that "This film is a visual feast. You will not regret watching Soggadu as the first half and songs itself would give value for your money". A critic from Sify wrote that "On the whole Soggadu looses tempo by interval though Ravi Babu has to be commended for packaging it with sugar coated entertainment. Still the film is watchable".
