= Meher Ramesh =

Indian film director

- Born: 6 November 1976 (age 49); Vijayawada, Andhra Pradesh
- Occupations: Film director, screenwriter
- Years active: 2005 - present

Meher Ramesh, is an Indian film director and screenwriter known for his works in Telugu and Kannada cinema.

== Early life ==
Meher Ramesh was born and raised in Vijayawada, Andhra Pradesh. His father served as a police inspector in the city. Ramesh completed his schooling at Machavaram and pursued a diploma in civil engineering at Gudlavalleru, near Gudivada. Following his studies, he worked for a few years in Botswana at Marina Amusements, a company specializing in snooker tables and other gaming equipment. During his time in Botswana, Ramesh's fascination with cinema grew. Without access to the internet, he kept up with film stories and dialogues through letters. Additionally, Ramesh was involved in Telugu association activities while in Botswana.

After returning to Vijayawada, Ramesh transitioned into the snooker business, where he significantly popularized the game in Andhra Pradesh. He established numerous snooker outlets across the state, including the first snooker room in Hyderabad at Kukatpally. His efforts led to the sale of 600 snooker tables and contributed to the game's widespread popularity in the region.

== Film career ==
Before becoming a director, Ramesh played a supporting role in Bobby (2002).

Ramesh debuted as a director with the Kannada film Veera Kannadiga (2004), which was simultaneously made in Telugu as Andhrawala (2004). Veera Kannadiga was a box office success, while Andhrawala was a box office bomb. His second film was Ajay (2006), a Kannada film which was a remake of Okkadu (2003).

Ramesh made his Telugu debut with Kantri (2008), starring N. T. Rama Rao Jr. The film received mixed talk and was performed decently at the box office. He then directed Billa (2009) with Prabhas.

Ramesh went on to direct Shakti (2011), his second collaboration with NTR Jr. Following this, he directed Shadow (2013).

Ramesh made his directorial comeback in 2023 with Bhola Shankar, starring Chiranjeevi. The film, a remake of the Tamil film Vedalam (2015), was received poorly by critics.

== Filmography ==
=== As an actor ===
Year	Title	Role	Language
2002	Bobby	Sunil (Neech)	Telugu

=== As a director ===
Year	Title	Language	Notes
2004	Veera Kannadiga	Kannada	Made simultaneously with Andhrawala (2004)
2006	Ajay	Kannada	Remake of Okkadu (2003)
2008	Kantri	Telugu	
2009	Billa	Telugu	Remake of Don (1978), Yugandhar(1979),Billa (1980) and Billa (2007)
2011	Shakti	Telugu	
2013	Shadow	Telugu	
2023	Bhola Shankar	Telugu	Remake of Vedalam
