= Kalpana Rai =

Indian actress (1950–2008)

- కల్పనా రాయ్
- Born: May 9, 1950
- Died: February 6, 2008 (aged 57) Kakinada, Andhra Pradesh
- Occupation: Actor
- Years active: 1974 - 2008

Kalpana Rai (9 May 1950 – 6 February 2008) was an Indian actress from Andhra Pradesh who predominantly appeared in Telugu films. She acted in more than 430 films.

She was born in Kakinada.

== Personal life ==
Kalpana Rai was born in Kakinada. She had experience in stage, through which she entered into films. Though she acted in more than 400 films she died poor.

== Career ==
She made her debut as an actress with the film O Seeta Katha in 1974. She was known for comical roles with peculiar dialect of Godavari districts. Her last film was Soggadu (2005).

== Notable filmography ==
- O Seeta Katha (1974)
- Needa Leni Aadadi (1974)
- Bharatamlo Oka Ammayi (1975)
- Raaja (1976) as Paru
- Sri Rama Bantu (1979) as Durgamma
- Kodallostunnaru Jagratta (1980)
- Thathayya Premaleelalu (1980)
- Ram Robert Rahim (1980)
- Doctor Malathi (1982)
- Pratigna (1982) as Kanakam
- Bangaru Bhoomi (1982) as Woman at the village well
- Neti Bharatam (1983)
- Adavalle Aligithe (1983)
- Kondaveeti Nagulu (1984) as Kannamma's(Radhika Sarathkumar) aunt
- Srimathi Kaavali (1984)
- Mukkopi (1984)
- Ooha Sundari (1984)
- Danavudu (1984)
- Nava Mohini (1984)
- Kongumudi (1985) as Nurse
- Pattabhishekam (1985)
- Sanchalanam (1985)
- Aggiraju (1985)
- Surya Chandra (1985)
- Seetharama Kalyanam (1986)
- Muddula Krishnayya (1986)
- Chadastapu Mogudu (1986)
- Aadi Dampathulu (1986)
- Kaliyuga Pandavulu (1986)
- Chaitanyam (1986)
- Karu Diddina Kapuram (1986)
- Captain Nagarjun (1986)
- Dabbevariki Chedu (1987)
- Muvva Gopaludu (1987)
- Srinivasa Kalyanam (1987)
- Bharatamlo Arjunudu (1987)
- Donga Kapuram (1987)
- Aakhari Poratam (1988)
- Janaki Ramudu (1988)
- Agni Keratalu (1988)
- Chattamto Chadarangam (1988) as Bhadrakali
- Bazaar Rowdy (1988)
- Donga Kollu (1988)
- Chinni Krishnudu (1988)
- Veguchukka Pagatichukka (1988)
- Bandhuvulostunnaru Jagartha (1989)
- Agni (1989)
- Swara Kalpana (1989)
- Vicky Dada (1989)
- Adavilo Abhimanyudu (1989)
- Sakshi (1989)
- Bamma Mata Bangaru Baata (1989)
- Dorikithe Dongalu (1989)
- Krishna Gari Abbayi (1989)
- Kondaveeti Rowdy (1990)
- Nari Nari Naduma Murari (1990)
- Chevilo Puvvu (1990)
- Kadapa Reddamma (1990)
- Muddula Menalludu (1990)
- Thalli Tandrulu (1991)
- Shatruvu (1991)
- Pandirimancham (1991)
- Golmaal Govindam (1992)
- Brindavanam (1992)
- Aapadbandhavudu (1992)
- Valu Jada Tolu Beltu (1992)
- Chinnalludu (1993)
- Jamba Lakidi Pamba (1993)
- Vintha Kodallu (1993)
- Madam (1994)
- Palnati Pourusham (1994)
- Jailor Gari Abbayi (1994)
- Brahmachari Mogudu (1994)
- Maatho Pettukoku (1995)
- Bhale Bullodu (1995)
- Lingababu Love Story (1995)
- Akkada Ammayi Ikkada Abbayi (1996)
- Sampradayam (1996) as Peramma
- Super Heroes (1997)
- Hitler (1997)
- Circus Sattipandu (1997)
- Preminchukundam Raa (1997)
- Pape Naa Pranam (1998)
- Yuvaratna Rana (1998)
- Pandaga (1998)
- Seenu (1999)
- Kalisundam Raa (2000)
- Bachi (2000)
- Pelli Sambandham (2000)
- Goppinti Alludu (2000)
- Devullu (2000)
- Vamsoddharakudu (2000)
- Choosoddaam Randi (2000)
- Manasu Paddanu Kaani (2000)
- Priyamaina Neeku (2001)
- Itlu Sravani Subramanyam (2001)
- Nuvvu Naaku Nachav (2001)
- Allari (2002)
- Seema Simham (2002)
- Soggadu (2005)
- Madhumasam (2007)

== Death ==
She died because of her illness at her residence in Indiranagar, Hyderabad. Even though she acted in more than 400 films she could not save much. Movie Artistes’ Association donated Rs.10,000 for her funeral and there were hardly any visitors to pay their last respects.
