= Asalu =

2023 Indian Telugu-language film by Uday–Suresh

- Release poster
- Directed by: Uday Bandari–Suresh Khambhampati
- Written by: Ravi Babu
- Produced by: Ravi Babu
- Starring: Poorna; Ravi Babu
- Cinematography: Charan Madhavaneni
- Edited by: Satyanarayana Balla
- Music by: S S Rajesh
- Production company: Flying Frogs
- Distributed by: ETV Win
- Release date: 13 April 2023
- Running time: 102 minutes
- Country: India
- Language: Telugu

Asalu (transl. Original) is a 2023 Indian Telugu-language crime thriller film directed by Uday Bandari–Suresh Khambhampati, and written and produced by Ravi Babu. The film features Poorna and Ravi Babu in important roles.

The film was released on 13 April 2023 on ETV Win.

== Plot ==
In Asalu (2023), forensic pathology professor Chakravarthy is murdered during an online class, shocking his students and colleagues. CID Officer Ranjith Rao is assigned the investigation and quickly realizes that the case is more complex than it appears, involving multiple suspects with potential motives. Vandhana, a colleague of Chakravarthy, assists Ranjith in his inquiry as they uncover hidden relationships and conflicting narratives. As the investigation progresses, Ranjith must sift through evidence, interrogate suspects, and unravel the truth behind the professor's death while navigating deception and unforeseen revelations. The film unfolds as a traditional whodunit, gradually revealing the motivations of each character linked to the case.

== Cast ==
- Poorna as Vandana
- Ravi Babu as Ranjith Rao
- Surya Kumar Bhagawan Das as Chakravarthy
- Satya Krishnan
- Pranavi Manukonda
- Meena Vasu
- Manava Koteswara Rao
- Delhi Rajeswari

== Release and reception ==
Asalu was released on 13 April 2023 on ETV Win.

The Times of India rated the film 2.5 out of 5. Srivathsan Nadadhur of OTTPlay gave a rating of 2 out of 5 and wrote that "the investigative thriller is too generic and does little to grab your attention with the story or the storytelling".
