= Allari (film) =

2002 Telugu film directed by Ravi Babu

- Poster
- Directed by: Ravi Babu
- Written by: Nivas (dialogues)
- Screenplay by: Ravi Babu
- Produced by: Ravi Babu
- Starring: Naresh; Shweta Agarwal; Nilambari
- Cinematography: Loganathan Srinivasan
- Edited by: Marthand K. Venkatesh
- Music by: Paul J
- Production company: Flying Frogs
- Distributed by: Suresh Movies
- Release date: 10 May 2002
- Country: India
- Language: Telugu
- Box office: ₹5 crore distributors' share

Allari (transl. Ruckus) is a 2002 Indian Telugu-language romantic comedy film produced and directed by Ravi Babu under the Flying Frogs banner, the film stars Naresh, Shweta Agarwal and Nilambari in their debuts.

Allari was released on 10 May 2002 and was a box office success. Naresh who became popular with this film, eventually prefixed the title Allari to his name. The film was remade in Tamil as Kurumbu. The film is loosely based on the 1987 American teen romantic drama film Some Kind of Wonderful.

== Plot ==
Ravi (Naresh) belongs to a middle-class family. His father, Mahabala Rao (Kota Srinivasa Rao), runs a small business and is quite tight-fisted when it comes to money. Ravi's best friend Aparna (Shweta Agarwal) lives in the same building as him. Appu and Ravi grew up together, share a special friendship, and Appu has always been there for Ravi whenever he needs anything (especially "money"). Both Ravi and Appu take each other for granted and are unaware of their feelings for each other.

Ravi has a crush on a new neighbour, Ruchi (Nilambari), who has recently moved into the flat opposite his. Ruchi enjoys all the attention and gifts she receives from the opposite sex and is quite a flirt. Ravi, who believes he is deeply in love with Ruchi, writes her a love letter and asks Appu to pass it on to Ruchi without revealing the source. Appu reads the letter and finds its content very childish. She rewrites the letter to make it more expressive and passes it to Ruchi. The letter has the desired effect on Ruchi, and she loves the idea of having a secret admirer.

One fine day, Ravi introduces himself as the one who wrote the love letter, and they start dating. The love letter (which was not destroyed) accidentally changes hands a few times, leading to several misunderstandings and confusion, especially between Ruchi's father and Ravi's mother. Apu starts feeling lonely and hurt and feels bad for her best friend, who was so blind to the truth. During this period, she realizes her true feelings towards Ravi. The last act comes when Ruchi invites Ravi to her place, saying she was all alone and wants to give him a "special gift" on his birthday. Before Ruchi bestows her "special gift" on Ravi, their parents storm into the flat, leading to comical mayhem and ending with each character waking up to their own folly. Meanwhile, Appu has been admitted into a medical college and is leaving town. Ravi gets a chance to read the letter he wrote to Ruchi and realizes Appu wrote it to stop him from making a fool of himself. The movie ends with Appu forgiving Ravi after he honestly expresses how he feels about her.

== Cast ==
- Naresh as Ravi
- Shweta Agarwal as Aparna "Appu"
- Nilambari as Ruchi
- Chalapathi Rao as Visweswara Rao "Visu", Ruchi's father
- Subhashini as Sujatha, Ruchi's mother
- Kota Srinivasa Rao as Mahabala Rao, Ravi's father
- Apoorva as Vasumati "Vasu", Ravi's mother
- Tanikella Bharani as Apartment Secretary
- Sudha as Aparna's mother
- Lakshmipati as Simpiri, Lift boy cum Gardener
- Kalpana Rai as one of the flat members
- Baby Satya Gayatri as Priya, Ravi's sister
- Sanjay Jha as Sanjay (voice dubbed by Ravi Babu)
- Sherlyn Chopra as the girl in Ravi's dream sequences

== Soundtrack ==
Allari

Soundtrack album by Paul J
- Released: 2002
- Genre: Feature film soundtrack
- Length: 18:37
- Language: Telugu

Paul J chronology
Allari (2002)	Thalaimagan (2006)

The music of the film was composed by Paul J.

The music director used offbeat instruments (like Tabla, flute etc.) in the background.

There are five songs in the film. All songs are written by Sirivennela. Three of them are situational songs and two of them are dream songs (duets). The canning of duets is in MTV song picturization format.

No.	Song	Singers	Writer	Length
1	"Kingini Mingini"	Chinmayi Sripaada, Suresh Peters, Aparna	Sirivennela Seetharama Sastry	03:31
2	"Raa Podam"	Aparna, Devan	Sirivennela Seetharama Sastry	04:14
3	"Athayyo Mavayyo"	Mano, Grace Karunas	Sirivennela Seetharama Sastry	03:26
4	"Nara Naram"	Srinivas, Aparna	Sirivennela Seetharama Sastry	03:44
5	"O Muddisava"	Ravi Varma, Lavanya	Sirivennela Seetharama Sastry	03:42

== Reception ==
Sify gave three out of five stars, and praised Naresh for his performance. Idlebrain.com, giving four out of five, wrote that "Allari is a good film and it should be appreciated well so that we can see new talent making films with innovative themes."
