= Andhrawala =

2004 film by Puri Jagannadh

- Theatrical release poster
- Directed by: Puri Jagannadh
- Written by: Kona Venkat (dialogues)
- Story by: Puri Jagannadh
- Produced by: Giri
- Starring: N. T. Rama Rao Jr. Rakshitha; Sayaji Shinde; Rahul Dev
- Cinematography: Shyam K. Naidu
- Edited by: Marthand K. Venkatesh
- Music by: Chakri
- Production company: Sri Bharathi Enterprises
- Release date: 1 January 2004 (India)
- Running time: 154 minutes
- Country: India
- Language: Telugu
- Budget: ₹14 crore

Andhrawala (transl. Andhrite) is a 2004 Indian Telugu-language action film written and directed by Puri Jagannadh and starring N. T. Rama Rao Jr. playing a dual role, while Rakshitha, Sayaji Shinde, and Rahul Dev play important roles. Music was composed by Chakri while cinematography was handled by Shyam K. Naidu. This film was simultaneously made in Kannada as Veera Kannadiga with Puneeth Rajkumar, directed by Meher Ramesh.

The film follows Munna, a labor leader’s son who returns to Mumbai to avenge his father’s murder and dismantle the underworld syndicate that devastated his family while protecting the rights of the oppressed.

Andhrawala was released amidst immense hype, as it served as N. T. Rama Rao Jr.’s immediate follow up to the Telugu industry hit Simhadri. Despite the historic anticipation, the movie underperformed at the box office. The film's pre-release hype was historic, marked by a record breaking public gathering of over 10 lakh (1 million) fans, reportedly the largest such turnout for any actor in India.

== Plot ==
Munna is a slum dweller in Hyderabad who learns from a person named Basha that his father is Shankar Pehalwan, a labourer who fought against a gangster named Bade Mia for the rights of Andhra people in Mumbai. Shankar and Bade Mia's enmity rapidly developed due to Shankar and his men accidentally killing his son. During the naming ceremony of Munna, Bade Mia assassinated Shankar and his wife, but Shankar's subordinate Basha managed to escape with Munna, where he placed Munna on a footpath beside a beggar. Learning about this, Munna wages a war against Bade Mia, where he finally finishes Bade Mia and his empire, thus avenging Shankar's death.

== Cast ==
- N. T. Rama Rao Jr. in a dual role as
  - Shankar Pehlwaan
  - Munna
- Rakshita as Chitra (Voice Dubbed by Saritha)
- Sanghavi as Shankar's wife
- Sayaji Shinde as Bade Mia
- Rahul Dev as Dhanraj
- Banerjee as Basha
- Nassar as Chitra's father
- Brahmanandam as Home Minister
- Mahesh Goyani as Bade Mia's son
- M. S. Narayana as Dhanraj's assistant
- Ramaprabha
- Telangana Shakuntala
- Pavala Syamala
- Raghu Babu as Calcutta Baba, Shankar’s friend & Bade Mia’s henchman
- Raghu Kunche
- Ranganath
- Rajiv Kanakala
- Supreeth
- Venu Madhav as Munna's friend
- Jeeva
- Uttej
- G. V. Sudhakar Naidu
- Bandla Ganesh
- Raghava Lawrence (special appearance in the song "Naire Naire")

== Production ==
The film was launched on 11 April 2003 at Annapurna Studios, alongside its Kannada counterpart, which was directed by Meher Ramesh, Jagannadh's protégé.

== Music ==
The music was composed by Chakri and released by Aditya Music. The audio launch was held at N. T. Ramarao's birth place, Nimmakuru, on 5 December 2003. It was said to be the first audio launch where 10 lakhs people participated in it. Nachaki of Telugu Cinema wrote "Chakri sings all the songs in this movie, sharing some with Kausalya when unavoidable. The lyricis do not make much sense most of the time. The songs do not seem to have a lasting impact, and one should wait to see if the visuals can do wonders to the impact of the songs".

Andhrawala

Soundtrack album by Chakri
- Released: 2004
- Recorded: 2004
- Genre: Soundtrack
- Length: 28:40
- Label: Aditya Music
- Producer: Chakri

Chakri chronology
Toli Choopulone (2003)	Andhrawala (2004)	Pedababu (2004)

Track list
No.	Title	Lyrics	Singer(s)	Length
1.	"Nippu Tunakai"	Bhaskarabhatla Ravi Kumar	Chakri, Kousalya	4:37
2.	"Gitchi Gitchi"	Kandikonda	Chakri, Kousalya	4:43
3.	"Malleteegaroi"	Kandikonda	Chakri, Kousalya	5:28
4.	"Kokko Kolamissa"	Kandikonda	Chakri, Kousalya	4:31
5.	"Unga Unga"	Bhaskarabhatla Ravi Kumar	Chakri, Kousalya	4:37
6.	"Nairey Nairey"	Bhaskarabhatla Ravi Kumar	Shankar Mahadevan	4:44
Total length:				28:40

== Reception ==
Idlebrain wrote "First half of the film is OK. Interval bang is interesting. The second half is dull. The flashback episode - that is supposed to justify the title of film - could not evoke the right emotion".
