= Y. Kasi Viswanath =

Indian actor and director

Yanamadala Kasi Viswanath
- Born: Purushottapatnam, Andhra Pradesh, India
- Education: B.Com
- Occupations: Actor, director, screenwriter
- Years active: 2002–present
- Spouse: Hema Latha
- Children: 2

Yanamadala Kasi Viswanath is an Indian actor and film director known for his work in Telugu cinema. He has worked as an assistant director, associate director, and co-director on over 25 films. Viswanath made his directorial debut with the romantic comedy Nuvvu Leka Nenu Lenu (2002), which became a blockbuster. He then directed Tholi Choopulone (2003), which marked the debut of Nandamuri Kalyan Ram. In 2008, he transitioned to acting with Nacchavule, which became a breakthrough role, and since then, he has appeared in over 90 films.

== Early life ==
He was born in Purushottapatnam, Seethanagaram mandal near Rajahmundry, East Godavari district of Andhra Pradesh. He completed his primary education in his native village. From 6th to 12th standard, he studied in Polavaram government high school. He did his B.Com. degree from Raja Mahendravaram. His uncles used to own a film theater. He used to watch films from his childhood. Inspired by the films he used to prepare simple scripts and narrate them to his mother. She also encouraged him.

When he was studying intermediate, he watched a film shooting of Tholi Kodi Koosindi (1981) directed by K. Balachander. He got inspired by that movie and used to discuss films with his uncles. He proposed to his family that he should enter into film industry. His cousin Gadde Ratnaji Rao took him to Chennai and introduced him to Kanoori Ranjith Kumar who was producing the film Lanke Bindelu.

== Film career ==
=== Film making ===
He started as assistant director to Vijaya Nirmala for the film Lanke Bindelu. When the film industry gradually shifted to Hyderabad, he moved there to work with Suresh Productions assisting in their film making. He worked as a co-director for hit films like Preminchukundam Raa (1997), Ganesh (1998), Kalisundam Raa (2000). Then he got promoted to director for the film Nuvvu Leka Nenu Lenu (2002) written by himself. He also directed the film Toli Choopulone (2003) produced by Usha Kiran Movies. It was Nandamuri Kalyan Ram's first film as a lead actor.

=== Actor ===
He got good name as a director for his first film. When he was waiting for the next film, he visited Annavaram temple. Director Ravi Babu met him there and offered a father role in his upcoming film Nachavule (2008). Ravi Babu and Viswanath knew each other when they were working for Suresh Productions. He accepted that role and it earned him good recognition as an actor. Later he played similar roles in many films.

== Personal life ==
Director Sriwass is his cousin.

== Filmography ==
=== As director ===
| Year | Title | Notes |
|---|---|---|
| 2002 | Nuvvu Leka Nenu Lenu | Also lyricist |
| 2003 | Toli Choopulone | |

=== As actor ===
| Year | Title | Role | Notes |
|---|---|---|---|
| 2008 | Nacchavule | Luv's father | |
| 2009 | Ride | Mahesh's father | |
| 2010 | Darling | | |
| 2010 | Namo Venkatesa | Ramanujam | |
| 2010 | Kalavar King | Rajesh's father | |
| 2011 | Parama Veera Chakra | Income tax officer | |
| 2011 | Mr. Perfect | Maggie's relative | |
| 2011 | Kandireega | Shruti's father | |
| 2011 | Mugguru | Balatripura Sundari's uncle | |
| 2011 | It's My Love Story | Arjun's father | |
| 2011 | Priyudu | Madhu Latha's father | |
| 2012 | Lovely | | |
| 2012 | Adhinayakudu | Minister | |
| 2012 | Endukante Premanta | Chef at Sravanthi's house | |
| 2012 | Mem Vayasuku Vacham | Lucky's father | |
| 2012 | Tuneega Tuneega | Maithri's father | |
| 2013 | Mirchi | | |
| 2014 | Kotha Janta | Suvarna's father | |
| 2014 | Pyar Mein Padipoyane | Chinna's father | |
| 2014 | Drushyam | Restaurant Owner | |
| 2014 | Govindudu Andarivadele | Satya's father | |
| 2014 | Erra Bus | | |
| 2015 | Pataas | Police officer | |
| 2015 | Bhale Bhale Magadivoy | Praveen's Boss | |
| 2016 | Dictator | Babji | |
| 2016 | Run | Srinivas | |
| 2016 | Karam Dosa | Transport Office Owner | |
| 2017 | Sathamanam Bhavati | | |
| 2017 | Gunturodu | Suryanarayana's friend | |
| 2017 | Maa Abbayi | Abbayi's father | |
| 2017 | Nenorakam | | |
| 2017 | Vaisakham | | |
| 2017 | Kadaisi Bench Karthi | Karthi's father | Tamil film |
| 2017 | Okka Kshanam | Ramakrishna | |
| 2018 | Naa Peru Surya | Varsha's father | |
| 2018 | Pantham | Akshara's Father | |
| 2018 | Saakshyam | Advocate Murthy | |
| 2018 | Anaganaga O Premakatha | | |
| 2019 | Rakshasudu | Constable Viswanath | |
| 2020 | Aswathama | | |
| 2020 | Amrutham Dhvitheeyam | Sanjeevan's father | |
| 2021 | Most Eligible Bachelor | Defence lawyer | |
| 2022 | Chor Bazaar | Judge | |
| 2023 | Ranga Maarthaanda | | |
| 2024 | Vey Dharuvey | Shankar's father | |
| 2024 | Kismat | Karthik's father | |
| 2024 | Shivam Bhaje | | |
| 2024 | Vidya Vasula Aham | | |
