= Andagadu =

- DVD cover
- Directed by: Pendyala Venkata Rama Rao
- Written by: Gopi Venkatesh (dialogues)
- Screenplay by: Pendyala Venkata Rama Rao
- Story by: K. Subhash
- Produced by: Dande Srinivasa Rao
- Starring: Rajendra Prasad; Damini
- Cinematography: Prasad Murella
- Edited by: Basava Paidi Reddy
- Music by: Sri
- Production company: Sri Nilaya Pictures
- Release date: 1 April 2005
- Running time: 132 mins
- Country: India
- Language: Telugu

Andagadu (transl. Handsome) is a 2005 Telugu-language comedy film, produced by Dande Srinivasa Rao under the Sri Nilaya Pictures banner and directed by Pendyala Venkata Rama Rao. It stars Rajendra Prasad and Damini, with music composed by Sri.

== Cast ==
- Rajendra Prasad as Sundaram
- Damini as Ramya
- Chandra Mohan as Viswanatham
- M. S. Narayana as Satyam
- Venu Madhav as Raju
- Sameer as Sujatha's brother-in-law
- Junior Relangi as Comedy Wizard
- Bhavana as Suvarna
- Harika as Sujatha
- Sudha as Sudha
- Hema as Nagamani
- Sana as Sujatha's sister
- Allari Subhashini as Aliveelu
- Pavala Shyamala as Mutyalu
- Banda Jyothi as C.I.

== Soundtrack ==
Andagadu

Film score by Sri
- Released: 2005
- Genre: Soundtrack
- Length: 19:31
- Producer: Sri

Music was composed by Sri. Music was released on Music Company.

No.	Title	Lyrics	Singer(s)	Length
1.	"Gunthalakadi Gummadi"	Jonnavithhula	Mano, Malavika	3:36
2.	"Karukumeeda"	Bharati Babu	Murali, Malavika	4:11
3.	"Eppudeppude"	Jonnavithhula Ramalingeswara Rao	S. P. Balasubrahmanyam, M. M. Srilekha	4:13
4.	"Ososi Ososi"	Chirravuri Vijaya Kumar	Mano, Malavika	4:08
5.	"Mojupadda Mohini Pesachini"	Bandaru Dannaiah	Kalpana	3:23
Total length:				19:31
