= Shafi (actor) =

Indian actor (born 1980)

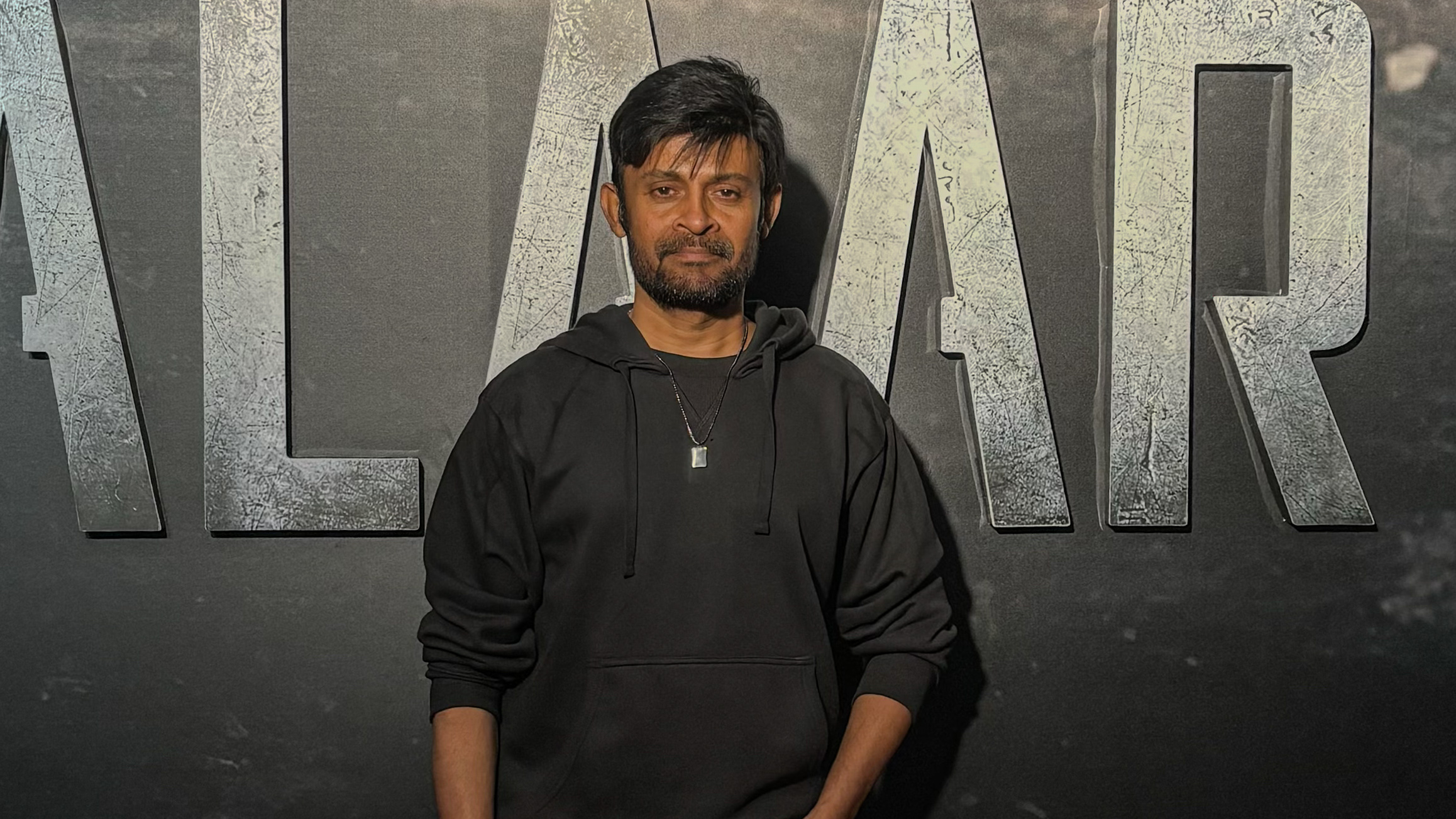
- Shafi in 2024
- Born: 6 April 1980 (age 46); Andhra Pradesh
- Education: National School of Drama
- Occupation: Actor
- Years active: 2002–present
- Awards: Nandi Awards; Filmfare Awards South

Mohammed Shafiullah Moinudden, known professionally as Shafi, is an Indian actor primarily recognized for his roles in Telugu cinema. Known for his villainous roles, Shafi gained acclaim in 2002 for his debut film Khadgam, for which he won the Filmfare Award for Best Villain – Telugu. With notable performances in movies like Kamli (directed by K. N. T. Sastry), Chatrapathi (directed by S. S. Rajamouli), and Khaleja (directed by Trivikram Srinivas), he has established himself as a key player in the industry.

== Career ==
Shafi made his debut in Krishna Vamsi's directorial Khadgam (2002) as the villain Azhar. Critics praised his debut, and he received the Filmfare Award for Best Villain – Telugu for the role.

After Khadgam, he acted in various supporting and negative roles in several Telugu films like Praanam (2003) and Varsham (2004). In 2005, he played a key antagonist in S. S. Rajamouli’s Chatrapathi, winning the Cine Goers Award for Best Supporting Actor.

In 2006, Shafi took his first lead role opposite Nandita Das in Kamli, a Telugu drama directed by K. N. T. Sastry. He played a drunkard coolie, a deeply researched role. The film won the National Film Award for Best Feature Film in Telugu. He also appeared in films like Mayajalam & Nuvve.. Nuvve... (both 2006)

He made his Tamil debut in Bheemaa (2008). He had comedic and supporting roles Ready (2008) and Khaleja (2010), his first collaboration with Mahesh Babu, where his role as Siddha won him the Bharathamuni Award for Best Supporting Actor. He also featured in Dookudu (2011) again with Babu, Julayi (2012) with Allu Arjun, and Balupu (2013) with Ravi Teja.

In 2023, Shafi starred in Salaar: Part 1 – Ceasefire – by Prashanth Neel, marking his third outing with Prabhas and will reprise his role in Salaar: Part 2 - Shouryanga Parvam. He also acted in the short film 3:15 AM (2023), directed by Amit Raj Verma, which won Best Thriller at the Los Angeles Film Awards. Shafi was nominated for Best Actor (Short Film) at the Cannes World Film Festival, gaining worldwide recognition.

== Filmography ==
=== Telugu films ===
Year	Film	Role	Note
2002	Khadgam	Azhar	Debut film
2003	Praanam	Uma's brother's nephew	
2004	Varsham	Kaasi	
2005	Danger	Gattayya's brother	
2005	Chhatrapati	Ashok / Akash	
2006	Maayajaalam	Chhatrapati	
2006	Nuvve.. Nuvve...		
2006	Kamli	Redya	
2007	Dhee		
2007	Maharajasri		
2008	Ready	Nagappa	
2009	Katha		
2009	Current	Shafi	
2009	Shh...		
2010	Cara Majaka		Simultaneously in Tamil, Telugu and Kannada
2010	Khaleja	Sidhappa	
2010	Telugammayi		
2010	Killer		
2011	Golconda High School	Madhu Babu	
2011	Wanted	Raja	
2011	Prema Kavali	Babji	
2011	Dookudu	Qadir	
2012	Tuneega Tuneega		
2012	Julayi	Lala	
2013	Balupu	Kaasi	
2013	Kiss	Murthy	
2013	Sahasra	Chinappa	
2013	Baadshah	Baadshah's henchman	
2014	Jaihind 2	Chandru	Simultaneously in Tamil, Telugu and Kannada
2014	Pilla Nuvvu Leni Jeevitham	Journalist Shafi	
2015	A Shyam Gopal Varma Film	Shyam Gopal Varma	
2015	Sher	Chotu	
2015	Shivam	Mustafa	
2017	Mister	Sadasiva Rayalu	
2017	Yuddham Sharanam	Selvam	
2018	Hyderabad Love Story		
2018	Rangu		
2019	Akshara		
2019	Brochevarevarura	Constable Ashok Kumar	
2020	Run	Real Doctor	
2021	Drushyam 2	Janardhan	
2022	Godfather	Murugan	
2023	Salaar: Part 1 – Ceasefire	Thiru	
2024	Bhoothaddam Bhaskar Narayana	John Philip	
2025	Solo Boy		

=== Tamil films ===
Year	Film	Role	Note
2008	Thenavattu	Santhosh	
2008	Bheemaa	Chinna's friend	
2009	Sindhanai Sei	Shankar	
2010	Kutti Pisasu	Mandhira Moorthy	Simultaneously in Tamil, Telugu and Kannada
2014	Jaihind 2	Chandru	Simultaneously in Tamil, Telugu and Kannada
2017	12-12-1950		

=== Other language films ===
Year	Film	Role	Language	Note
2004	Run		Hindi	Cameo Appearance
2008	Firaaq	Ghogha	Hindi	
2010	Bombat Car		Kannada	Simultaneously in Tamil, Telugu and Kannada
2014	Abhimanyu	Chandru	Kannada	Simultaneously in Tamil, Telugu and Kannada
2019	Ranahedi		Kannada	

Television

- ATM
