= Manasara (film) =

2010 film by Ravi Babu

- Directed by: Ravi Babu
- Screenplay by: Satyanand
- Story by: Ravi Babu
- Produced by: Prakash Babu Kadiyala
- Starring: Vikram Veer; Sri Divya
- Cinematography: Sudhakar Reddy Yakkanti
- Edited by: Marthand K. Venkatesh
- Music by: Shekar Chandra
- Production company: Moving Images
- Release date: 10 December 2010
- Country: India
- Language: Telugu

Manasara (transl. Whole-heartedly) is a 2010 Indian Telugu language romantic sports film directed by Ravi Babu and produced by Prakash Babu Kadiyala. The film stars debutants Vikram Veer and Sri Divya. The music was composed by Shekar Chandra with cinematography by Sudhakar Reddy Yakkanti and editing by Marthand K. Venkatesh. The film was released on 10 December 2010.

The film is set against the backdrop of Kalaripayattu, a martial art form that has its origins in Kerala.

== Plot ==
Rajapalayam in Kerala is a village where time has stood still, a maternal, ritualistic society where honour held its head and sword high. The village folk lived and breathed Kalaripayittu, which was their God, life, and justice, and were totally cut off from the modern world. Vikram's family had to move to this village when his father's job was transferred there.

Anjali is a village belle who teaches blind kids. Vikram falls in love with her, but conscious of his average looks, is not sure the pretty Anjali would accept him. His local benefactor Krishnan Kutty tells him that the secret to gaining a woman's love is not good looks but having a good heart. Vikram follows the advice, masks himself, and starts helping Anjali in difficult moments. The goodness of Vikram melts Anjali's heart, and she falls in love with him.

However, trouble is brewing in Anjali's home as her wicked stepmother tries to get Anjali closer to Rajan Pillai. Rajan was the national Kalaripayittu champ, and the devil incarnate when it came to women. He was also the brother of Anjali's stepmother. Rajan discovers Anjali's relationship with Vikram, and Anjali is locked up in her home. Rajan thrashes Vikram in front of Anjali and makes him lick his sandals in front of Anjali to show her Vikram's cowardice. Vikram's family is told to pack and leave town immediately.

Krishnan Kutty intervenes and calls for a meeting of the village elders. He tells them that Vikram's only mistake was falling in love and that Anjali was in love with him too. He tells them that since their society was maternal, the girls' wishes had to be respected. However, the village elders ordained that Vikram was not a local and had to forget the girl and leave, but on further persuasion by Krishan Kutty, they reconsidered their decision and delivered their verdict. Since the girl had two suitors, only a bout of Kalaripayittu would determine who her husband would be. The winner would get her hand. The gauntlet is thrown, and a boy with no knowledge of Kalaripayittu is pitted against the champ. Krishnan Kutty decides to train Vikram, and Anjali's father trains Rajan. Both Anjali's father and Krishnan Kutty were disciples of one master and had a score to settle. The bloody ten-round Kalaripayittu climax decides the fate of Anjali and Vikram.

== Cast ==
- Vikram Veer as Vikram
- Sri Divya in a dual role as Anjali / Radha, Anjali's mother
- Bhanu Chander as Krishnam Kutty
  - Ravi Prakash as Young Krishnan Kutty
- Ronson Vincent as Rajan Pillai
- Ramaraju as Veerabhadra, Anjali’s father
- Annapoorna as Papayamma
- Bangalore Padma as Anjali’s step-mother
- Krishna Mohan as Vikram's father
- Usha Sri as Vikram’s mother
- M. S. Narayana as Vikram’s maternal grandfather (cameo appearance)
- Ravi Babu in a cameo appearance in the song "Parvaledu"

== Music ==
Music for this movie was composed by Shekar Chandra.

No.	Song	Singers	Length (m:ss)
1	"Nuvvila"	Krishna Chaitanya	
2	"Parvaledu"	Geetha Madhuri	
3	"O Pitchi Prema"	Ranjith	
4	"Mella Mellaga"	Krishna Chaitanya, Geetha Madhuri	
5	"Ninne Ninne"	Geetha Madhuri	
6	"Aakasam Thala Vanchali"	Ranjith	
7	"The Ballad of Krishnan Kutty"	Mano, Pranavi	

== Reception ==
Jeevi of Idlebrain.com wrote that "On the flip side, a better second half and an inspiring climax would have changed the commercial aspect of the movie". A critic from NDTV wrote that "the film has nothing big to offer".
