= Marthand K. Venkatesh =

Indian film editor

- Occupation: Film editor
- Years active: 1994–present

Marthand K. Venkatesh is an Indian film editor who works in Telugu films. He is the recipient of four Nandi Awards.

== Early life and career ==
Venkatesh is son of noted Telugu film editor K. A. Marthand. He used to assist his father in editing for the films produced by Suresh Productions. Telugu film director K. Raghavendra Rao gave him the first independent charge of editing his Allari Premikudu in 1994. With the success of his films in the maiden year like Preminchukundam Raa, Bavagaru Bagunnara? and Tholi Prema. He lost his father the same year and was guided by Raghvendra Rao. He has many hit films for his credit during the last two decades. They include Daddy (2001), Kalisundam Raa, Leader, Happy Days, Arya, Anand (2004), Bommarillu and Pokiri (2006), Arundhati and more.

== Awards and nominations ==
Nandi Awards

- Best Editor - Tholi Prema (1998)
- Best Editor - Daddy (2001)
- Best Editor - Pokiri (2006)
- Best Editor - Arundhati (2008)

== Filmography ==
Year	Title	Notes
1994	Allari Premikudu	
1995	Pokiri Raja	
1995	Taj Mahal	
1996	Pelli Sandadi	
1996	Dharma Chakram	
1996	Sahasa Veerudu Sagara Kanya	
1996	Bombay Priyudu	
1997	Preminchukundam Raa	
1997	Mere Sapno Ki Rani	
1997	Paradesi	
1998	Bavagaru Bagunnara?	
1998	Ganesh	
1998	Premante Idera	
1998	Tholi Prema	
1999	Thammudu	
1999	Hum Aapke Dil Mein Rehte Hain	Hindi film
1999	Raja	
1999	Swayamvaram	
1999	Naa Hrudayamlo Nidurinche Cheli	
1999	Seenu	
1999	Sambayya	
1999	Ravoyi Chandamama	
1999	Preyasi Rave	
2000	Kalisundam Raa	
2000	Badri	
2000	Bagunnaraa	
2000	Ninne Premistha	
2000	Azad	
2000	Jayam Manadera	
2000	Chiru Navvutho	
2000	Yuvakudu	
2000	Uncle	
2000	Sivanna	
2001	Dollar Dreams	
2001	Prematho Raa	
2001	Chirujallu	
2001	Itlu Sravani Subramanyam	
2001	Daddy	
2002	Subbu	
2002	Takkari Donga	
2002	Nuvvu Leka Nenu Lenu	
2002	Vasu	
2002	Allari	
2002	Kuch Tum Kaho Kuch Hum Kahein	Hindi film
2002	Naa Manasistha Raa	
2002	Idiot	
2002	Bobby	
2002	Eeshwar	
2002	Thotti Gang	
2003	Raghavendra	
2003	Pellam Oorelithe	
2003	Ammayilu Abbayilu	
2003	Idi Maa Ashokgadi Love Story	
2003	Indiramma	
2003	Amma Nanna O Tamila Ammayi	
2003	Madhushree	
2003	Vasantham	
2003	Neeku Nenu Naaku Nuvvu	
2003	Anaganaga O Kurraadu	
2003	Pellamtho Panenti	
2003	Ori Nee Prema Bangaram Kaanu	
2003	Shivamani	
2003	Veede	
2003	Abhimanyu	
2003	Neeke Manasichaanu	
2004	Veera Kannadiga	Kannada film
2004	Andhrawala	
2004	Arya	
2004	Lakshmi Narasimha	
2004	Athade Oka Sainyam	
2004	Anandamanandamaye	
2004	Venky	
2004	Nenunnanu	
2004	Intlo Srimathi Veedhilo Kumari	
2004	143	
2004	Cheppave Chirugali	
2004	Shankar Dada MBBS	
2004	Anand	
2004	Sakhiya	
2004	Mass	
2004	Pedababu	
2004	Pallakilo Pellikoothuru	
2004	Donga Dongadi	
2004	Bhadradri Ramudu	
2004	Andarivaadu	
2005	Allari Pidugu	
2005	Manasu Maata Vinadhu	
2005	Sukran	
2005	Sada Mee Sevalo	
2005	Avunanna Kaadanna	
2005	Bhadra	
2005	Super	
2005	Andhrudu	
2005	Dhana 51	
2005	Gowtam SSC	
2006	Style	
2006	Kokila	
2006	Pokiri	
2006	Evandoi Srivaru	
2006	Godavari	
2006	Sri Krishna 2006	
2006	Ajay	
2006	Bommarillu	
2006	Roommates	
2006	Boss	
2006	Raraju	
2007	Thulasi	
2007	Desamuduru	
2007	Madhumasam	
2007	Dhee	
2007	Munna	
2007	Shankardada Zindabad	
2007	Hello Premistara	
2007	Happy Days	
2007	Billa	
2007	Don	
2007	Anasuya	
2007	Mee Sreyobhilashi	
2007	Godava	
2008	Pourudu	
2008	Bhale Dongalu	
2008	Bommana Brothers Chandana Sisters	
2008	Parugu	
2008	Kantri	
2008	Bujjigaadu	
2008	Ullasamga Utsahamga	
2008	Baladoor	
2008	Black & White	
2008	Ashta Chamma	
2008	Ankit, Pallavi & Friends	
2008	Souryam	
2008	Kotha Bangaru Lokam,	
2008	Kousalya Supraja Rama	
2008	Hero	
2008	Yuvatha	
2008	Ekaloveyudu	
2008	Vinayakudu	
2008	Nachavule	
2009	Arundhati	
2009	Malli Malli	
2009	Aakasamantha	
2009	Manorama	
2009	Billa	
2009	Ride	
2009	Current	
2009	Evaraina Epudaina	
2009	Oy!	
2009	Snehituda...	
2009	Anjaneyulu	
2009	Baanam	
2009	Sankham	
2009	Villagelo Vinayakudu	
2009	Arya 2	
2009	Katha	
2010	Om Shathi	
2010	Bindaas	
2010	Leader	
2010	Kalavar King	
2010	Maro Chaitra	
2010	Yagam	
2010	Chalaki	
2010	Golimaar	
2010	Panchakshari	
2010	Jhummandi Naadam	
2010	Thakita Thakita	
2010	Adi Nuvve	
2010	Brindavanam	
2010	Orange	
2010	Aalasyam Amrutam	
2010	Manasara...	
2010	Nagavalli	
2011	Ala Modalaindi	
2011	Gaganam	
2011	Shakti	
2011	Mr. Perfect	
2011	Nagaram Nidrapotunna Vela	
2011	Nuvvila	
2011	Oh My Friend	
2011	Solo	
2011	Priyudu	
2011	Vykuntapali	
2012	Nuvva Nena	
2012	All the Best	
2012	Life Is Beautiful	
2012	Avunu	
2012	Rebel	
2012	Yamaho Yama	
2013	Ko Antey Koti	
2013	Ongole Githa	
2013	Okkadine	
2013	Gouravam	
2013	Shadow	
2013	Greeku Veerudu	
2013	Anthaka Mundu Aa Tarvatha	
2013	Doosukeltha	
2013	Waiting in Wilderness	
2013	Uyyala Jampala	
2013	Pelli Pustakam	
2013	DK Bose	
2014	Yevadu	
2014	Bhimavaram Bullodu	
2014	Basanti	
2014	Laddu Babu	
2014	Anaamika	
2014	Prema Geema Jantha Nai	
2014	Ra Ra Krishnayya	
2014	Aa Aiduguru	
2014	Drushyam	
2014	Gallo Telinattunde	
2014	Adavi Kaachina Vennela	
2014	Rough	
2014	Mukunda	
2014	Usko	
2014	Poga	
2015	Avunu 2	
2015	Thanu Nenu	
2016	Bangalore Naatkal	Tamil film
2016	Meeku Meere Maaku Meeme	
2016	Gentleman	
2016	Fidaa	
2016	Srirastu Subhamastu	
2016	Eedu Gold Ehe	
2017	Baba Sathya Sai	
2017	Maa Abbayi	
2017	V The Decision	
2017	Ami Thumi	
2017	Kaadhali	
2017	Jayadev	
2017	Oye Ninne	
2018	Sammohanam	
2018	Geetha Govindam	
2018	Aatagallu	
2018	2 Friends	
2018	Snehave Preethi	
2018	Manasainodu	
2018	Anaganaga O Premakatha	
2019	Vinara Sodara Veera Kumara	
2019	Chanakya	
2019	Aaviri	
2020	Buchinaidu Kandriga	
2020	V	
2021	Sreekaram	
2021	Narappa	
2021	Most Eligible Bachelor	
2021	Drushyam 2	
2021	Love Story	
2022	Super Machi	
2022	Sarkaru Vaari Paata	
2022	Bhala Thandanana	
2022	Godfather	
2022	Neetho	
2022	Yashoda	
2022	Khudiram Bose	
2023	Bholaa Shankar	
2023	Bhari Taraganam	
2023	Mama Mascheendra	
2023	Jorugaa Husharugaa	
2024	Purushothamudu	
2025	Ramam Raghavam	
2025	Meghalu Cheppina Prema Katha	
2025	Tribanadhari Barbarik	
2025	Bakasura Restaurant	
2025	Karmanye Vadhikaraste	
2026	Honey	
