= Praanam =

- Directed by: Malli
- Written by: Subba Rao Master
- Produced by: Maganti Babu
- Starring: Allari Naresh; Sadha
- Cinematography: Bharani K. Dharan
- Edited by: Basva Paidireddy
- Music by: Kamalakar
- Distributed by: GMRC
- Release date: 25 July 2003
- Country: India
- Language: Telugu

Praanam (transl. Life) is a 2003 Telugu fantasy romantic drama film directed by Malli, written by Subba Rao Master, and produced by Maganti Babu. The film stars Allari Naresh and Sadha in the lead roles, while Seetha, Mantripragada Venkat Rao, Banerjee, and Shafi play supporting roles. The music was composed by Kamalakar. The film was released on 25 July 2003. The film is based on the concept of reincarnation.

== Plot ==
In a village by a coastal area, Sivudu belongs to a lower caste, and Kathyayani is a chaste Brahmin. When the village head, who is also Kathyayani's strict Brahmin father, learns that they fell in love, he decides to hang them off because inter-caste love/marriage is a sin as per their village laws and the consequences of previous experiences regarding inter-caste love. These two souls take a rebirth. Kathyayani is born as Uma, a sister of a powerful politician. Sivudu is born as Kaasi, an NRI orphan who returns from Los Angeles to do a Telugu music video album. He is in search of a pristine Telugu girl and finds Uma. They fall in love, but her politician brother wants her to marry his nephew. Uma and Kaasi run away from Vizag city to the coastal area, and incidentally, they land in a place where Kathyayani and Sivudu lived. The village men identify them. The rest of the film is all about how it all ends well.

== Cast ==
- Allari Naresh as Sivudu / Kaasi
- Sadha as Kathyayani / Uma
- Seetha as Sivudu's mother
- Mantripragada Venkat Rao as Kathyayani's father
- Banerjee as Uma's brother
- Shafi as Uma's brother's nephew
- Anitha Chowdary
- M. S. Narayana
- Kovai Sarala
- Rallapalli
- Rajan P. Dev in a special appearance

== Soundtrack ==
Praanam

Soundtrack album by Kamalakar
- Recorded: 2002–2003
- Genre: Film soundtrack
- Label: Supreme Music
- Producer: Kamalakar

The film features music by Kamalakar. The lyrics were written by Sri Sai Harsha, Suddala Ashok Teja, and E. S. Murthy. The song "Nindu Noorella" was a super hit.

| Song title | Singers | Lyricist |
|---|---|---|
| "Nindu Noorella" | Sonu Nigam, Mahalakshmi Iyer | Sri Sai Harsha |
| "Sayyari Na Yenki" | S. P. Balasubrahmanyam | Sri Sai Harsha |
| "Snehama Swapnama" | Hariharan, K. S. Chithra | Sri Sai Harsha |
| "Vaatapi" | K. S. Chithra | E. S. Murthy |
| "Bramhandam" | S. P. Balasubrahmanyam | Sai Sriharsha |
| "Nindu Noorella"(Sad) | Kamalakar, Gopika Poornima | Sai Sriharsha |
| "Dhim Dhim Dhim" | Shankar Mahadevan, Kalpana | Suddala Ashok Teja |
