= Parama Veera Chakra =

2011 Indian film by Dasari Narayana Rao

- Promotional poster
- Directed by: Dasari Narayana Rao
- Written by: Dasari Narayana Rao
- Produced by: C. Kalyan
- Starring: Nandamuri Balakrishna; Ameesha Patel; Neha Dhupia; Sheela Kaur; Jayasudha
- Cinematography: Ch. Ramana Raju
- Edited by: Gautham Raju
- Music by: Mani Sharma
- Production company: Teja Cinema
- Release date: 12 January 2011
- Country: India
- Language: Telugu

Parama Veera Chakra is a 2011 Indian Telugu-language action film produced by C. Kalyan on Teja Cinema banner and directed by Dasari Narayana Rao as his 150th film. Starring Nandamuri Balakrishna, Ameesha Patel, Neha Dhupia, Sheela Kaur and Jayasudha. The music is composed by Mani Sharma.

The film was released during the 2011 Sankranthi weekend to poor reviews. However, it won the Sarojini Devi Award for a Film on National Integration at the 2010 Nandi Awards.

== Cast ==
- Nandamuri Balakrishna in a dual role as Major Jay Simha and Chakradhar
- Ameesha Patel as Rajani
- Neha Dhupia as Razia Sultana
- Sheela Kaur as Sheila
- Nagineedu as M.P.
- Murali Mohan as Colonel Jitendra
- Vijayakumar as Kumar
- Brahmanandam as Scientist
- Ali as Robo
- Kota Srinivasa Rao as Rajani's father
- Chalapathi Rao
- Ranganath as Judge
- Krishna Bhagawan as Secretary
- Vijayachander as Army Chief
- L.B. Sriram as Servant
- Rajiv Kanakala as Bride
- Charan Raj as Terrorist
- Raghu Babu
- Gundu Hanumantha Rao
- AVS
- Satyam Rajesh
- Jeeva
- Jenny
- Vinod as Bride's Father
- Y. Kasi Viswanath as Income-tax Officer
- Devadas Kanakala as Judge
- Kishore Das as Minister
- K. Ashok Kumar
- Venu Yeldandi
- Bharani
- Jayasudha as Chakradhar's mother
- Rajyalakshmi as Jayasimha's mother
- Hema as Hema, Scientist's Wife
- Rama Prabha as Rajani's grandmother
- Allari Subhashini as MP's Wife
- Geetanjali as Judge

=== Cameo appearances ===
- Dasari Narayana Rao as himself
- D. Ramanaidu as himself
- Kodi Ramakrishna as himself
- Boyapati Srinu as himself
- B. Gopal as himself
- Srinu Vaitla as himself
- Roja as herself
- Kalyani as Komaram Bheem's Wife
- Archana Veda Sastry as Mandodari (Ravana's Wife)

== Soundtrack ==
Parama Veera Chakra

Film score by Mani Sharma
- Released: 29 December 2010
- Recorded: 2010
- Genre: Soundtrack
- Length: 36:00
- Label: Aditya Music
- Producer: Mani Sharma

Mani Sharma chronology
Kalyanram Kathi (2010)	Parama Veera Chakra (2011)	Vastadu Naa Raju (2011)

The soundtrack and background score is composed by Mani Sharma. The audio was released on 29 December 2010. The audio function of the movie is held at Shilpakala Vedika in Hyderabad. The audio rights of the soundtrack were purchased by Aditya Music.

Track-List
No.	Title	Lyrics	Singer(s)	Length
1.	"Lokana Chikatini"	Suddala Ashok Teja	S. P. Balasubrahmanyam, Vandemataram Srinivas, Sri Krishna	7:23
2.	"Mitra Mitra 1"	Ananta Sriram	S. P. Balasubrahmanyam, Sunitha Upadrashta	4:15
3.	"Arjuna Phalguna"	Ramajogayya Sastry	Hemachandra, Malavika	4:47
4.	"Main Kya Karoo"	Sahithi	Hemachandra, Malavika	4:25
5.	"Ekka Ekka"	Dasari Narayana Rao	Mano, Malathi	3:51
6.	"Talli Kadupulo"	Dasari Narayana Rao	S. P. Balasubrahmanyam	5:59
7.	"Ramudaina"	Jonnavithhula	Mano	1:08
8.	"Mitra Mitra 2"	Ananta Sriram	S. P. Balasubrahmanyam, Sunitha Upadrashta	4:13
Total length:				36:00

== Reception ==
A critic from IANS wrote that "Parama Veera Chakra directed by Dasari Narayana Rao boasted of a surefire winning combination with top technicians and two Bollywood actress, but it fails to please the audience because of the age old narrative technique and a miserable script".
