= Allari Premikudu =

1994 Telugu film by Raghavendra Rao

- DVD cover
- Directed by: K. Raghavendra Rao
- Written by: Satyanand
- Produced by: Suresh; Satyanand
- Starring: Jagapati Babu; Soundarya; Rambha; Kanchan; Ramya Krishna
- Cinematography: Chota K. Naidu
- Edited by: K. A. Marthand; Marthand K. Venkatesh
- Music by: M. M. Keeravani
- Production company: Sri Satya Durga Arts
- Release date: 5 May 1994
- Running time: 139 minutes
- Country: India
- Language: Telugu

Allari Premikudu (transl. Naughty Lover) is a 1994 Indian Telugu-language musical romance film directed by K. Raghavendra Rao and produced by Suresh and Satyanand. The film stars Jagapati Babu, Soundarya, Rambha, and Kanchan in lead roles, with Ramya Krishna in a guest appearance. The music was composed by M. M. Keeravani. The film was loosely inspired by the 1989 American film Worth Winning.

Allari Premikudu marked noted screenwriter Satyanand's debut as a producer. The film, noted for its high production values, underwent significant casting changes during its development, eventually featuring a star-studded ensemble. Despite its scale and casting, the film was a box-office failure upon its release. It was later dubbed into Tamil as Pokkiri Kaadhalan.

== Plot ==
The film follows Krishna Murthy, also known as Kittu, a renowned sitar player with a penchant for high-stakes betting. Chandrendra Rao Naidu, commonly called Chandram, frequently challenges Kittu under the influence of his elder brother, Hari. Chandram bets Kittu ₹3 lakh to make three difficult women—Bhavani, Jhansi, and Jogeswari Devi—fall in love with him. Bhavani is a fiercely independent student who hates men and advocates for women's welfare, Jhansi is a fearless police officer disinterested in marriage, and Jogeswari Devi is an ascetic forcibly confined to the lifestyle by the manipulative Bhairavayya for personal gain. Kittu accepts the challenge and sets out on the task.

Kittu first approaches Bhavani, pretending to be a social worker and orchestrating a staged encounter where his accomplice, Ahobilam, poses as a goon named Khan Dada. Bhavani falls for Kittu’s act. Next, Kittu targets Jhansi by kidnapping her younger brother, Jakki, with the help of a hired goon and then rescuing him. However, Jakki uncovers the truth and informs Jhansi, leading to Kittu's arrest. Despite this, Jhansi eventually forgives him and develops feelings for him. Finally, Kittu charms Jogeswari Devi, who reciprocates his love. However, Bhavani soon discovers Kittu’s deception and hires a thug, Malli, to attack him. When Malli turns on Bhavani, attempting to assault her, Kittu saves her, earning her forgiveness.

Kittu declares his success to Chandram and invites the three women to Golkonda Fort at different times. He persuades Bhavani and Jhansi to carve their names along with his on the tomb walls as proof of their love. However, when it is Jogeswari Devi’s turn, she is attacked by Bhairavayya and Hari, and succumbs to her injuries after expressing her love for Kittu. The miscreants frame Kittu for her murder, and Jhansi is tasked with investigating the case. Misled by evidence, Jhansi believes Kittu to be guilty and pursues him. Kittu, meanwhile, uncovers Hari and Bhairavayya's involvement in the crime and confronts them. Seeking refuge, Kittu hides at Bhavani’s home, where she helps him upon realizing his innocence.

During a confrontation, Kittu reveals the truth behind his actions. He discloses that he is married and has a daughter. In a flashback, it is shown that Kittu was married to Swapna, the granddaughter of a wealthy man, Gajapati. Their marriage faced opposition due to class differences, but Swapna left her family to live with Kittu. The couple's happiness was short-lived, as Hari and Chandram, Swapna's cousins, schemed to seize her inheritance. They attacked Swapna, who succumbed to her injuries after giving birth to a mentally unstable daughter. Hari is revealed to be the mastermind behind Chandram's challenge, orchestrating the scheme because Gajapati had bequeathed his entire fortune to Swapna and her child before his death. Hari's intention was to eliminate Kittu by luring him into the dangerous pursuit of these three women, thereby clearing the path for Hari to claim the inheritance.

Hari and Bhairavayya abduct Kittu’s daughter in a final attempt to eliminate her and claim the inheritance. In a climactic showdown, Kittu rescues his daughter and defeats the antagonists. The film concludes on a happy note, with Kittu reuniting with Bhavani and Jhansi, who accept him and his daughter.

== Cast ==
- Jagapati Babu as Krishna "Kittu" Moorti
- Ramya Krishna as Swapna
- Soundarya as Jhansi
- Rambha as Bhavani
- Kanchan as Jogeswari Devi
- Satyanarayana as Gajapati
- Srihari as Hari
- Rami Reddy as Bhairavayya
- Brahmanandam as Ahobilam/Khan Dada
- Sudhakar as Chandram alias Pandem Chandredra Rao
- AVS as Chandram's assistant
- Dharmavarapu Subrahmanyam as Bhavani's father
- Nirmalamma as Lakshmi Devi
- Mada Venkateswara Rao as the Chief Minister of Andhra Pradesh
- Narsing Yadav as Goon
- Chidatala Appa Rao as Hotel Manager
- Kamalakar as College Student
- Ramana Murthy as Constable
- Bangalore Padma as Devi's maid

== Production ==
After the success of Allari Mogudu (1992) and Allari Priyudu (1993), director K. Raghavendra Rao began work on a new film titled Allari Premikudu, continuing the trend of incorporating "Allari" in the title. This project was the debut production venture of writer Satyanand, who partnered with businessman Suresh under their newly established production banner.

The initial casting plans featured Kamal Haasan in the lead role, alongside Divya Bharati and Meena as the heroines. However, the unexpected demise of Divya Bharati and Meena’s scheduling conflicts necessitated a revision in the casting. Soundarya and Rambha were selected as replacements. Following changes to the story, a third female lead was required, leading to the casting of newcomer Kanchan. Considering the new plot with three heroines, director Raghavendra Rao decided to replace Kamal Haasan with Jagapathi Babu, believing his popularity among female audiences would better suit the narrative.

Principal photography began on 31 December 1993. The inaugural clapboard was given by veteran filmmaker Dasari Narayana Rao. At the time, Allari Premikudu was one of the most expensive productions in Telugu cinema. The film was notable for being Soundarya’s first role as a police officer. In addition to the three lead heroines, actress Ramya Krishna played a guest role, further enhancing the film’s star-studded cast.

== Music ==
Allari Premikudu

Film score by M. M. Keeravani
- Released: 1994
- Genre: Soundtrack
- Length: 28:49
- Label: Akash Audio
- Producer: M. M. Keeravani

M. M. Keeravani chronology
Bhairava (1994)	Allari Premikudu (1994)	Anna (1994)

The music was composed by M. M. Keeravani. The music was released on Akash Audio Company.

No.	Title	Lyrics	Singer(s)	Length
1.	"Ku Ku Ku"	Veturi	S. P. Balasubrahmanyam, K. S. Chithra	5:04
2.	"Puttadi Bommaku"	Sirivennela Seetharama Sastry	S. P. Balasubrahmanyam, K. S. Chithra	5:10
3.	"Ninnu Choodagane"	Veturi	S. P. Balasubrahmanyam, K. S. Chithra	4:47
4.	"Bantilaanti Battayi"	Vennelakanti	S. P. Balasubrahmanyam, K. S. Chithra	5:14
5.	"Chilipi Chilaka"	Veturi	S. P. Balasubrahmanyam, K. S. Chithra	4:47
6.	"Naari Jana Priyatama"	M. M. Keeravani	S. P. Balasubrahmanyam, K. S. Chithra	4:47
Total length:				28:49

== Reception ==
Allari Premikudu was released on May 5, 1994. Despite featuring a prominent cast and showcasing high production values, the film did not achieve commercial success at the box office.
