= Sangamam (2008 film) =

Indian romantic drama film

- Poster
- Directed by: Rasool Ellore
- Written by: Surendra Krishna (dialogues)
- Screenplay by: Rasool Ellore
- Story by: Surendra Krishna
- Produced by: Ramana Pemmaraju; Kripikar Tadikonda
- Starring: Rohit Khurana; Sindhura Gadde
- Cinematography: Jayaram; S Sandeep Reddy
- Edited by: Gowtham Raju
- Music by: M. M. Keeravani
- Production company: Manoranjan Entertainments
- Release date: 11 July 2008
- Country: India
- Language: Telugu

Sangamam (transl. Confluence) is a 2008 Indian Telugu-language romantic drama film directed by Rasool Ellore and starring Rohit Khurana and Sindhura Gadde.

== Cast ==
- Rohit Khurana as Abhiram
- Sindhura Gadde as Samskruthi
- Murali Mohan as Jagadish
- Suhasini as Dr. Geetha
- Brahmanandam
- Avinash as Raghava Rao
- Sarah as Sneha
- Raghunatha Reddy
- Krishna Kaushik
- Anil
- Anand Varma
- Sivannarayana Naripeddi
- Narsing Yadav
- Maharshi Raghava
- Subbaraju
- Anita Chowdary
- Vijayasri
- Radha Kumari
- Vennela Rama Rao

== Production ==
The film began production in early 2007 with Sadha initially considered for the lead actress. The film's name was revealed in November 2007. The film was produced by NRI Ramana Pemmaraju. The film marks the Telugu debut of Rohit Khurana and the lead debut of Sindhura Gadde. The film was almost entirely shot in the United States, which mainly consisted of a 45-day schedule at Washington DC. Sindhura plays a woman who is close to her Indian heritage despite living in the United States. Producer Ramesh Varma felt that Sindhura was apt for the role since she is a Telugu and has travelled across the world. Murali Mohan, who played a significant role in the film, heaped praise on Sindhura's casting as he felt that many Bollywood actresses were doing Telugu films as opposed to Telugu-origin actresses. As of April 2008, the film's shooting was complete.

== Themes and influences ==
The film is about how love has no boundaries, which lives up to its title of Sangamam.

== Soundtrack ==
The music was composed by M. M. Keeravani. One of the songs that Keeravani composed featured lyrics written by Ananta Sriram during his college days. The audio was launched in November 2007 by Keeravani's wife, Sri Valli, who launched the soundtracks of Takkari (2007) and Visakha Express (2008) simultaneously. The audio launch took place on 15 November 2007 near Durgam Cheruvu.

All lyrics are written by Ananta Sriram.

Track listing
No.	Title	Singer(s)	Length
1.	"Poothavesina"	M. M. Keeravani, Pranavi	5:47
2.	"Santhosham"	Nani, Arun, Bhargavi Pillai, Geetha Madhuri	4:06
3.	"Paalaraathi Shilpaaniki"	M. M. Keeravani, Pranavi	4:24
4.	"Chinuku Chinuku"	Sunitha Upadrashta	5:23
5.	"Are You An Angel"	Bhargavi Pillai	3:20
Total length:			23:00

== Box office ==
The film was released on 11 July 2008 after being initially scheduled for December 2007. It was a box office failure.
