= Veera Kannadiga =

- DVD cover
- Directed by: Meher Ramesh
- Written by: Puri Jagannadh; M S Ramesh (dialogue)
- Produced by: K.S. Rama Rao; K. A. Vallabha
- Starring: Puneeth Rajkumar; Anita Hassanandani
- Edited by: Udayakumar
- Music by: Chakri
- Production company: Creative Commercials
- Release date: 1 January 2004
- Country: India
- Language: Kannada

Veera Kannadiga (transl. The Brave Kannadiga) is a 2004 Indian Kannada-language masala film directed by debutant Meher Ramesh from a story written by Puri Jagannadh who simultaneously shot the film in Telugu as Andhrawala starring Jr. NTR. The film stars Puneeth Rajkumar and Anita Hassanandani in the lead roles.

Veera Kannadiga was released on 1 January 2004, where it became a commercial success at the box office whereas the Telugu version bombed at the box office.

== Plot ==
Munna is a slum dweller in Bangalore who learns from a person named Vishwa that his father is Shankar, a labourer who fought against a gangster named Bade Mia for the rights of Kannadigas in Mumbai. Shankar and Bade Mia's enmity rapidly developed due to Shankar and his men accidentally killing his son. During the naming ceremony of Munna, Bade Mia assassinated Shankar and his wife, but Shankar's subordinate Vishwa managed to escape with Munna where he placed Munna on a footpath beside a beggar. Learning about this, Munna wages a war against Bade Mia, where he finally finishes Bade Mia and his empire, thus avenging Shankar's death.

== Cast ==
- Puneeth Rajkumar as Munna and Shankar (dual role)
- Anita Hassanandani as Chitra
- Kaushalya as Shankar's wife
- Laya as Lakshmi
- Sayaji Shinde as Bade Mia
- Avinash as Vishwa
- Riyaz Khan as Dhanraj
- Kazan Khan
- Bullet Prakash
- Karthik Sharma
- Besant Ravi

== Production ==
Meher Ramesh who assisted Puri Jagannadh, made his directorial debut with this film. The film was started on 22 August 2003 (alongside its Telugu counterpart, which was directed by Jagannadh himself) and was completed by 25 December 2003.

== Soundtrack ==
The music was composed by Chakri who also composed for the Telugu version Andhrawala. The soundtrack was released by Akash Audio. The track "Naire Naire" was reused from Andhrawala.

Veera Kannadiga

Soundtrack album by Chakri
- Released: January 2004
- Genre: Feature film soundtrack
- Length: 28:48
- Language: Kannada
- Label: Akash Audio
- Producer: Chakri

Chakri chronology
Andhrawala (2003)	Veera Kannadiga (2004)	143 (2004)
External audio
- Official Audio Jukebox on YouTube

No.	Title	Lyrics	Singer(s)	Length
1.	"Addadalli Kingu Naanu"	V. Nagendra Prasad	Shankar Mahadevan, Kousalya	5:00
2.	"Jeeva Kannada Deha Kannada"	Hamsalekha	Shankar Mahadevan	4:36
3.	"Mastu Hudugiye"	K. Kalyan	Chakri, Kausalya	5:29
4.	"Naire Naire Nai Naire"	Bangiranga	Puneeth Rajkumar	4:44
5.	"Sai Sai Monaleesa"	V. Nagendra Prasad	Ravivarma, Kausalya	4:31
6.	"Sikku Sikku Sundari"	K. Kalyan	Chakri, Kausalya	4:45

== Reception ==
Viggy wrote "Veera Kannadiga looks luxurious but for Kannadigas, is nothing but an Andhra Meal!". Deccan Herald wrote "Puneeth Rajkumar in a double role as father and son puts up a convincing show." He concluding writing, "The film’s main focus is on the gallantry of Kannadigas. Music by Chakri will appeal to the youngsters but there are too many songs. The movie will be an enjoyable fare for the lovers of comedy."

=== Box office ===
Veera Kannadiga completed 100 days at the theatres and became a commercial success at the box office.
