= Aaviri =

2019 Telugu film directed by Ravi Babu

- Theatrical release poster
- Directed by: Ravi Babu
- Written by: Ravi Babu
- Produced by: Ravi Babu
- Starring: Ravi Babu; Neha Chauhan
- Cinematography: N. Sudhakar Reddy
- Edited by: Marthand K Venkatesh
- Production company: Flying Frogs
- Distributed by: Sri Venkateswara Creations
- Release date: 1 November 2019
- Country: India
- Language: Telugu

Aaviri (transl. Steam) is a 2019 Indian Telugu-language horror thriller film written, directed, and produced by Ravi Babu. The film features Neha Chauhan, Ravi Babu, Sri Muktha, Bharani Shankar, and Mukhtar Khan in principal roles. Aaviri was released on 1 November 2019.

== Plot ==
Raj (Ravi Babu) and his wife Leena (Neha Chauhan) move into an old palatial house along with their younger daughter Munni (Baby Sri Muktha), after the accidental death of their elder daughter Shreya. Munni happens to see the ghost of her elder sister who had died due to their father's unattentiveness. The ghost tries to drive Munni away from the house and eventually succeeds. What happens next forms the rest of the story.

The ghost tries to get Munni out of the house but is always stopped by her mom and told to go back to her room. Eventually, Munni disappears one day, and it is found that Leena is the one who is possessed. Raj, along with an exorcism expert, tries to communicate with the ghost to find Munni's location and save her.

It is then revealed that the ghost is not Shreya's but Janhvi. Janhvi repeatedly blames Raj for her death and that he is the cause of her separation from her parents. Meanwhile, it is shown that Munni is in a coffin and has 2 chocolate bars with her that contain nuts (she is allergic). Raj realizes what is happening and narrates the story. Janhvi comes for an interview as an executive assistant and Raj hires her and gets attracted to her. He leaves little gifts on her desk every day expressing that he loves her. On the eve of the company's merger, Raj asks her to send him a copy of an email. While Jahnvi mails him, Raj confronts her to ask why she is avoiding him and his gifts. Janhvi declares she doesn't feel that way leaves the office, and gets to her car. Raj gets into the car to convince her but Jaanvi tries to leave the car, during which Raj pulls her back by the seatbelt, accidentally strangling her and killing her.

To save the company's merger and himself from the merger, he hides Janhvi's body and erases footage from the cameras. Janhvi came back as a ghost to haunt him and make him feel the same way her parents felt when they lost their daughter, by killing Munni. After admitting this, Raj and the exorcist ask Janhvi for Munni's location but she passes out before she can reveal. While they tried to wake her up, Raj could hear Munni's voice from the box that was trapped with Janhvi earlier. He unscrews the box and saves Munni, also realizes Munni did not eat the chocolates either and she is saved.

== Cast ==
- Ravi Babu as Raj
- Neha Chauhan as Leena
- Baby Sri Muktha as Munni
- Priya Vadlamani as Jahnvi
- Himaja as Kamala
- Bharani Shankar
- Mukhtar Khan

== Reception ==
The movie generally received negative reviews with critics labelling it dull, predictable and outdated.
