= Snehituda =

Snehithuda...
- Theatrical release poster
- Directed by: Satyam Bellamkonda
- Written by: Satyam Bellamkonda; Basha Sree
- Produced by: Prasad
- Starring: Nani; Maadhavi Latha; Brahmanandam; Nassar
- Cinematography: Vasu
- Edited by: Marthand K. Venkatesh
- Music by: Shiva Shankar
- Distributed by: Satya Entertainments
- Release date: 7 August 2009
- Running time: 133 minutes
- Country: India
- Language: Telugu

Snehithuda...(transl. My friend) is a 2009 Indian Telugu-language romantic drama film directed by Satyam Bellamkonda (in his directoral debut). It stars Nani and Maadhavi Latha. Prasad produced this film on Satya Entertainment's Banner. Sivaram Shankar provided the music. The film was released on 7 August 2009. The film was named after a song from Sakhi (2000).

== Plot ==
Sai (Nani) is an orphan who lies in court for a few bucks. Being homeless he stays on homes at nights like a thief. One night he went to stay on a villa where he is caught by Savitri (Maadhavi Latha). He begs her to let him stay for that night. She makes fun of him. In a sudden turn she runs away from home. Later that night she is caught by him in a park. She tells him that she is lost. He thinks that she lost her memory and he makes her join him as a partner in his lies in court. Eventually his kind and gentle nature makes her fall for him.

In a dramatic circumstance she tells him about herself. She is a daughter of well respected landlord (Nassar) in her village. She is very interested to tour with her friends, but her father rejected her wish. Savitri runs away from home. She is kidnapped by a gang who decide to rape her. Sai tries to stay nearby. Meanwhile, her angered father decides that her daughter is dead. After hearing her story Sai decides to reunite Savitri with her family.

== Cast ==
- Nani as Sai
- Maadhavi Latha as Savitri
- Nassar as Srinivasa Rao
- Apoorva
- Brahmanandam
- Gundu Hanumantha Rao
- MS Narayana
- Kinnera
- Prudhvi Raj
- Duvvasi Mohan

== Soundtrack ==
The music was composed by Shiva Shankar.

== Reception ==
Jeevi of Idlebrain.com rated the film rated the film two-and-a-half out of five and wrote that "On a whole, Snehituda is [sic] has a promising plot, but is marred by bad and uninteresting narration". A critic from The Times of India rated the film one-and-a-half out of five stars and wrote that "Despite picking a hackneyed plot, writer-director Satyam B fails to pen a gripping narration and mars the show. If he believes that a couple of comedy scenes could compensate for a well-crafted film than he is grossly mistaken". Deepa Garimella felt that the film drew a fine line between thriller and family drama. She praised the first half of the film as "a pretty entertaining watch", but panned the second half for its "outdated climax" and "cheesy dialogue". Overall, she gave the film a rating of 4.5/10, not recommending it for kids.
