= Indiramma (housing scheme) =

Housing scheme in Andhra Pradesh, India

Indiramma or Integrated Novel Development In Rural Areas and Model Municipal Areas (INDIRAMMA) is a mass housing scheme introduced by the Government of Andhra Pradesh. It covers people living in rural areas in the state of Andhra Pradesh.

== History ==
It started in the year 2006 when Y. S. Rajasekhara Reddy was the Chief Minister of Andhra Pradesh and aimed to make the state Hut-free.

== The Scheme ==
The scheme provides funds to the people below poverty line. The government support in 2013 stands at

- open category (upper castes) and Backward Classes from Rs 45,000 to Rs 70,000 in rural areas and from Rs 55,000 to Rs 80,000 in urban areas

- SC/ST is Rs 5 lakh in Urban and rural areas as per the new government promised.
