= Sudeepa Pinky =

Indian actress

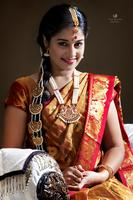
- Sudeepa Pinky
- Born: Sudeepa Raparthi; 28 February 1987 (age 39); Andhra Pradesh, India
- Occupation: Actress
- Years active: 1994–present
- Spouse: K.Sri Ranganadh

Sudeepa Raparthi (born 28 February 1987), better known by her stage name, Sudeepa Pinky, is an Indian actress who predominantly appears in Telugu cinema.

She started giving stage performances at the age of 3, and learned classical dance from her parents Raparthi Surya Narayana and Raparthi Satyavathi who are also classical dancers, running the Satya Sri dance academy. Her father was adopted by Shri Killada Satyam Garu, a dance master who was also a classical dancer and who holds the record of performing dance continuously for 42 hours.

In 1994 she entered the Telugu movie industry with M. Dharmaraju M.A, directed by Raviraja Pinnesetty. Nuvvu Naaku Nachav is a milestone in her career. She was also a contestant in Super 2. She was eliminated in episode 3 on 11 July 2016 because she didn't dare to attempt the stunt. She was the first contestant to be eliminated.

She also entered television industry known for her roles in Kotha Bangaram and Prathighatana.

== Filmography ==
- All films are in Telugu, unless otherwise noted.

Year	Film	Role	Notes
1994	M. Dharmaraju M.A.	Chintapandu	
1999	Alludugaaru Vachcharu	Mahalakshmi's sister	
2000	Maa Annayya	Young Gowri	
2001	Nuvvu Naaku Nachav	Pinky	
2001	Hanuman Junction	Young Meenakshi	
2002	Manasutho	Kanishk's Sister	
2002	Nee Sneham	Madhav's sister	
2002	Pilisthe Palukutha	Santhi's sister	
2003	Naaga	Naaga's sister	
2003	Ninne Ishtapaddanu	Charan's sister	
2003	Toli Choopulone		
2004	Anandamanandamaye	Bhuvana's cousin	
2004	7G Rainbow Colony	Anu	Tamil film
2004	7G Brindhavan Colony	Anu	
2004	Gudumba Shankar	Gowri's sister	
2005	Andhrudu	Archana's sister	
2005	Athanokkade	Ram's Sister	
2006	Asadhyudu	Pardhu's Sister	
2006	Stalin	Chitra's Sister	
2006	Bommarillu	Bujji	
2007	Maharathi		
2007	Veduka	Harini's friend	
2007	Kireedam	Sakthivel's younger sister	Tamil film; credited as Pinky
2007	Hello Premistara		
2007	Viyyalavari Kayyalu	Vamsi's sister	
2007	Anasuya		
2008	Andamaina Abaddham	Deepthi	
2008	Nachavule	Nurse	
2009	Manorama	Lakshmi	
2009	Ninnu Kalisaka	Kommali	
2010	Bindaas	Mahendra's daughter	
2011	Mr. Perfect	Vicky's sister	
2012	Lucky		
2013	Anthaku Mundu Aa Taravatha	Ani	
2014	Legend	Jaidev's Niece	
2014	Amara Kaaviyam	Karthika's sister	Tamil film

== Television ==
Year	Serial	Role	Channel
---	Sunayana	Sunayana	Gemini TV
2010-2011	Kotha Bangaram	Kasthuri	Gemini TV
2011-2012	Maavichiguru	Meenakshi	Gemini TV
2011-2012	Pasupu Kumkuma	Amrutha	Zee Telugu
2016-2019	Prathighatana	Pavithra	Gemini TV
2022	Aa Okkati Adakku	Revathy	Gemini TV
2022	Bigg Boss 6	Herself	Star Maa
