= Party (2006 film) =

2006 film by Ravi Babu

- Directed by: Ravi Babu
- Screenplay by: Satyanand
- Story by: Ravi Babu
- Produced by: Kumar Katineni
- Starring: Allari Naresh; Shashank; Madhu Sharma; Brahmanandam
- Cinematography: N. Sudhakar Reddy
- Edited by: Marthand K. Venkatesh
- Music by: Chakri
- Release date: 24 March 2006
- Country: India
- Language: Telugu

Party is a 2006 Indian Telugu-language film co-written and directed by Ravi Babu in the genre of comedy that makes a statement on the corporate environment shaping the IT world in the new millennium. It stars Allari Naresh, Shashank, Ravi Babu and Madhu Sharma. The plot of the film is heavily inspired from the Hollywood film Weekend at Bernie's.

== Plot ==
The story is about two college buddies Nani (Allari Naresh) and Bujji (Shashank) who get into trouble with a local don (Surya) and need to pay him a crore of rupees to get out of the situation. Meanwhile, a software firm (named Underware Hardware and Software Company!) headed by Dr. Rajendra Prasad (Brahmanandam) is facing a hostile take over by another firm. Rajendra Prasad had to build the world's fastest supercomputer in time to halt the takeover. But the rival firm sabotage his invention. Rajendra Prasad had no option but to sell his company to his rival, but decides not to and explores more options. Meanwhile, Nani and Bujji worm their way into Rajendra Prasad's company promising to give him the technology for a talking computer (named Bujji Babu 007) that would bring him the much needed millions. But Rajendra Prasad is assassinated while in their company. Fearing that fingers would point to them, they hide his body. A look alike takes Rajendra Prasad's place and tries to sell the company as quickly as possible so that he would get the interest of ₹20 crores. Rajendra Prasad's daughter Madhu (Madhu Sharma), meanwhile, falls in love with Nani. What follows is a series of anecdotes that lead to the unraveling of the mystery of the killer of the original Rajendra Prasad and preventing the rival company Wonderware from taking over Underware thus keeping to the wish of the original Rajendra Prasad.

The plot moves with interesting references to the world of computers with names borrowed from the terminology used by geeks in the IT campuses, like Microchip and Potato chip are the code names used by two employees (Ravi Prakash and his assistant) to sabotage the work of the company run by Rajendra Prasad. The role of a professional killer is played by Ravi Babu who kills only humans and not animals. But to his bad luck he ends up killing animals, accidentally, every time he tries to kill someone and is heart broken. This is a slapstick comedy with many inter-connected sub-plots that keep complicating the plot and adding to its hilarity. Lots of corporate espionage, sabotage, comedy and romance with a happy ending – that is the story of ‘Party’.

== Cast ==
- Allari Naresh as Thotakura Kishore Babu "Nani"
- Shashank as Katuri Ramesh Chandra "Bujji"
- Madhu Sharma as Anju Prasad
- Brahmanandam as Dr. G. Rajendra Prasad / John Abraham
- Ravi Babu as James
- Ravi Prakash as Mr. Berde
- Vijay Sai as Mr. Afridi, Lab Incharge
- Nuthan Kumar as Ramu
- Surya as Velu Anna
- Chalapathi Rao as CID Officer
- Krishnudu as Doctor
- M.S. Narayana as John Abraham (picture)
- Venu Madhav as Photographer
- Krishna Bhagawan in guest appearance
- Shankar Melkote as Doctor
- Rama Prabha
- Gundu Sudarshan as Principal Shriram Lagoo
- Rocket Raghava as Waiter
- Saira Banu as News Reporter Bhanu

== Music ==
Music for this film was composed by Chakri. The Lyrics are written by Bhaskarabhatla and Ravikumar. All songs were well picturised and got positive response.

No.	Song	Singers	Length (m:ss)
1	"Maja Chey"	Tina kamal	04:20
2	"Happy Birthday"	Revathi	03:34
3	"Nani Nani"	Chakri, Venu	02:55
4	"Touchme Touchme"	Kousalya	03:02
5	"Mosagallu"	Vasu, Manju	04:29
