= Maadhavi Latha =

Indian actress and politician

Madhavi Latha
- Born: Madhavi Latha; Hubli, Karnataka, India
- Education: Gulbarga University; Mysore University
- Years active: 2007-2023

Pasupuleti Madhavi Latha is an Indian actress who appears in Telugu and Tamil films. She made her debut as a lead in the 2008 film Nacchavule. The film was commercially successful and won three Nandi Awards. She later starred in films like Snehituda (2009), Aravind 2 (2013), and Aambala (2015).

== Early life ==
Madhavi Latha was born in a Telugu family in Hubli, Karnataka. Her parents are originally from Coastal Andhra. She obtained her degree from Gulbarga University, Karnataka and completed post-graduation from Mysore University.

== Film career ==
Madhavi made her feature film debut with the Telugu romantic film Nacchavule (2008), with a critic describing that she was promising in her role. Her next films Shh... and Snehituda opposite Nani, opened to negative reviews and box office collections. She subsequently spent a year in the United Kingdom, pursuing a Masters qualification in Fashion Designing at Coventry University, before relocating back to Hyderabad to restart a career in films. She made a comeback and worked on films including Aravind 2 (2013) as well as on the unreleased Choodalani Cheppalani alongside Taraka Ratna, where she played a deaf and mute girl.

Her first release in 2015 was her debut Tamil film, Sundar C's multi-starrer Aambala. Madhavi has first acted in Mahesh Babu's Athidi in a role of heroine's friend.

== Personal life ==
In an interview with TNR, Maadhavi discussed in length her personal life and problems and struggles in her career. She also mentioned that her co-star wanted to date her during the making of her debut movie, but she declined. Her first director tried casting couch with her, and when she declined, she alleges he tried to ruin her career and could be the reason for her not getting many offers. She confessed that a person is harassing her and her family for over 10 years and she is suffering because of this.

== Filmography ==
Year	Film	Role	Language	Notes
2007	Athidhi	Madhavi	Telugu	Debut film
2008	Nacchavule	Anu	Telugu	
2009	Shh...	Seeta	Telugu	
2009	Snehituda	Savithri	Telugu	
2011	Usuru	Anusha	Telugu	
2012	Choodalani Cheppalani		Telugu	
2013	Anustanam		Telugu	
2013	Aravind 2	Priya	Telugu	
2015	Aambala	Nadu Ponnu's daughter	Tamil	
2020	Lady		Telugu	
2021	Madurai Manikuravar		Tamil	
