= Kamli (2006 film) =

- Directed by: K. N. T. Sastry
- Written by: K. N. T. Sastry
- Produced by: Apoorva Chitra; B.C. Hari Charanaprasad; Sukanya
- Starring: Nandita Das; Tanikella Bharani; Shafi; L.B. Sriram; Roopa Devi
- Cinematography: Sunny Joseph
- Edited by: Beena Paul
- Music by: Isaac Thomas Kottukapally
- Release date: 2006
- Country: India
- Language: Telugu

Kamli is a 2006 Indian Telugu-language drama film directed by K. N. T. Sastry. The film stars Nandita Das in the title role of a Lambada girl. The film's lyrics were written by Suddala Ashok Teja. The film was showcased at the Busan International Film Festival in Korea and the Asian Film Festival in Mumbai.

== Plot ==
Kamli tackles the issues of the sale of the girl child (rampant in the community) and the swapping of the male child, a practice fairly common in the urban areas—particularly in the hospitals.

Kamli (Nandita Das) is the focal point of the tale. She is forced to sell her firstborn girl. It is a well-known fact that the girl child is not welcome in most Indian communities and amongst the Lambadas she is considered an ill omen. The boys are wanted as they feed their parents. One gets a peek into her life, how she is married to Redya (Shafi), her toil for a job, how she puts up with an alcoholic husband, how she faces the 'contractors' and other men folk who have lecherous designs on her and so on.

When she delivers a male child, her infant is swapped, and a girl child is placed instead. This incident forces her to fight for her son. The media's role (in the building of hype of Kamli's fight), her dharna and the subsequent outcome with some melodrama are portrayed in a stereotypical manner.

== Cast ==
- Nandita Das as Kamli
- Tanikella Bharani as Badya
- Shafi as Redya
- L.B. Sriram as Police Constable
- Roopa Devi as Ramli
- Kota Shankar Rao as Supervisor
- Y. K. Nageswara Rao as Supervisor
- Pavala Syamala as Ayah
- Vijayalakshmi as Cobbler
- Satyapriya as Doctor
- Bharati as Tribal Neighbor
- Lakshmi as Tribal Neighbor
- Sudhakar as Security officer
- Tadivelu as Tea Master
- Ashalatha
- Damodar
- Srinivasa Rao
- Kalachandra

== Production ==
Kamli was inspired by a K.N.T. Sastry's award-winning documentary harvesting babies. Sastry wanted to make a feature film based on the documentary about the plight of tribal women selling their babies for a pittance.

== Reception ==
Radhika Rajamani of Rediff.com wrote, "on the whole, Sastry's effort is laudable in bringing out the Lambadas' grim reality".

== Awards ==
- National Film Award for Best Feature Film in Telugu
- Nandi Award for Best Actress
