= Rush (2024 film) =

2024 Indian Telugu-language film by Satish Poloju

- Release poster
- Directed by: Satish Poloju
- Written by: Ravi Babu
- Produced by: Ravi Babu
- Starring: Daisy Bopanna; Karthik Ahuti
- Cinematography: N. Sudhakar Reddy
- Edited by: Satyanarayana Balla
- Music by: S. S. Rajesh
- Distributed by: ETV Win
- Release date: 13 June 2024
- Running time: 93 minutes
- Country: India
- Language: Telugu

Rush is a 2024 Indian Telugu-language action thriller film directed by Satish Poloju and, written and produced by Ravi Babu. The film features Daisy Bopanna and Karthik Ahuti in important roles.

The film was released on 13 June 2024 on ETV Win.

== Cast ==
- Daisy Bopanna as Kartika
- Karthik Ahuti as Adithya
- Master Venkat Shourya as Rishi
- Baby Methuku Anuraga as Riya
- Veeranna Chowdary as Narsingh
- Ravi Babu as Siva

== Release and reception ==
Rush was released on 13 June 2024 on ETV Win.

Asianet Telugu gave a rating of 2 out of 5. Satya Pulagam of ABP Desam gave a negative review and rated the film 1.5 out of 5.
