= Usko =

Usko is the given name of the following people:

- Usko Kemppi (1907–1994), Finnish composer and author
- Usko Meriläinen (1930–2004), Finnish composer
- Usko Nghaamwa, Namibian politician
- Usko Nyström (1861–1925), Finnish architect
- Usko Santavuori (1922–2003), Finnish sensationalist radio reporter

== See also ==
- Estadio Hanz Usko, stadium in Guazapa, El Salvador
