= Nacchavule =

2008 film by Ravi Babu

- Directed by: Ravi Babu
- Written by: Ravi Babu ( dialogues)
- Screenplay by: Satyanand
- Story by: Ravi Babu
- Produced by: Ramoji Rao
- Starring: Tanish; Maadhavi Latha
- Cinematography: Nixon
- Edited by: Marthand K. Venkatesh
- Music by: Shekar Chandra
- Production company: Ushakiran Movies
- Release date: 19 December 2008
- Running time: 132 minutes
- Language: Telugu

Nacchavule is a 2008 Indian Telugu romantic comedy film directed by Ravi Babu and produced by Ramoji Rao. The film stars Tanish and Maadhavi Latha in their lead acting debuts. The music was composed by Shekar Chandra with cinematography by Nixon and editing by Marthand K. Venkatesh.

The film was released on 19 December 2008 and was commercially successful at the box office, winning three Nandi Awards. The film was remade in Tamil as Ooh La La La (2012).

== Plot ==
The film is told as an autobiographical narrative in the voice of Luv Kumar.

Luv's parents fell in love and married despite belonging to different linguistic backgrounds. In the present, love has faded because Luv's father takes his wife’s affection for granted.

Looking for a female partner, Luv scours Hyderabad. He believes in a twisted logic that getting the first girlfriend is tough, and after that, the deluge would follow. He befriends Anu under strange circumstances. He shows off his new girlfriend to whoever cares. Suddenly, girls start finding him attractive, including women who had previously rejected him. He goes on a spree with numerous girls, conveniently forgetting Anu, who has fallen hopelessly in love with him. At a party, he lies to friends within Anu’s earshot that he has slept with her. This breaks Anu’s heart, and she decides to leave him and the town. Luv cannot understand her sudden coldness but continues to ignore her.

When Luv's mother dies, plunging his family into enormous grief, his father reflects on his relationship with his wife and feels terrible that he had taken her love for granted. He tells his son that people only realize the true value of others once they have left them. This strikes a chord in Luv, who realizes how he had taken Anu’s love for granted and hurt her. He leaves to find Anu and win her back. However, a MMS video of Luv and Anu kissing was inadvertently released by someone who recently bought Luv’s phone, which was stolen and sold off by his little brother. This resulted in Anu’s hatred towards Luv to increase. When she and her father decide to leave Hyderabad, Luv tries to stop her as her life is under threat from someone who holds a grudge against Luv. After seeing Luv get stabbed, Anu saves him and takes him to the hospital. After some time, Luv and Anu reconcile as friends, joining the same university, with Luv reflecting on his realization that he is not yet ready for relationships.

== Cast ==
- Tanish as Lava Kumar "Luv"
- Maadhavi Latha as Anu
- Y. Kasi Viswanath as Luv's father
- Raksha as Sushma, Luv's mother
- Narasimha Raju as Srinu
- Naveen as Mandy
- Kamesh as Anu's father
- Narayana Reddy
- Prasad as Anu's neighbour
- Sarath
- Allari Subhashini
- Sudeepa Pinky as Nurse

== Soundtrack ==
The music was composed by Shekar Chandra and the lyrics were penned by Bhaskarabhatla.

No.	Song	Singers	Length (m:ss)
1	"Evevo"	Ranjith	
2	"Paavu Thakkuva Thommidi"	Jassie Gift	
3	"Nesthama"	Deepu, Harshika	
4	"O O Priya"	Deepu, Harshika	
5	"Ninne Ninne"	Geetha Madhuri	
6	"Manninchava"	Ranjith	

== Reception ==
Jeevi of Idlebrain.com rated the film 3 out of 5 and wrote, "On a whole, Nachavule is worth a watch for being a different flick and a theme film". A critic from the Bangalore Mirror wrote, "With debutant actors, simple storyline, witty dialogues, good cinematography and refreshing direction as ingredients, this film has enough for a family entertainer".

== Awards ==
Award	Category	Nominee	Outcome
Nandi Awards	Best Supporting Actress	Raksha	Won
Nandi Awards	Best Female Playback Singer	Geetha Madhuri (for "Ninne Ninne" song)	Won
Nandi Awards	Best Female Dubbing Artist	R Haritha	Won

== Controversy ==
Maadhavi Latha alleged that she was severely harassed and her mother scolded for refusing to become close with an important person in the movie team during shooting, and refusing to wear a short dress. Another major revelation is that production company Ushakiran Movies pays less than other production houses.
