= Ravi Babu =

Indian actor, director, producer, screenwriter

- Born: Vijayawada, Andhra Pradesh, India
- Occupations: Actor; director; producer; writer
- Years active: 1998-present
- Parent: Chalapathi Rao (father)
- Website: ravibabu.com

Ravi Babu is an Indian actor, director, writer, and producer in Telugu cinema.

== Personal life and career ==
His father is actor Chalapathi Rao. Babu was invited to participate in a course at the Sony Institute in San Jose, California. After the course, he did a short stint at TV Asia as an ENG producer and also worked as a cameraman and editor.

In 1999, he started his own production house, Flying Frogs, initially to produce television commercials, but it later became a feature film production house.

Babu wrote and directed an advertising campaign with actress Tamannaah for Celkon phones. He also created an advertising campaign for N. Chandrababu Naidu, the Chief Minister of Andhra Pradesh, for the 2014 elections. Over the years, Ravi Babu, through his film production company, Flying Frogs, has closely collaborated and worked with the late Ramoji Rao's ETV network, and Daggubati Suresh's Suresh Productions.

== Filmography ==
Key
†	Denotes films that have not yet been released

- All films are in Telugu except otherwise noted.

=== As film director ===
Films directed
Year	Title	Notes	Ref.
2002	Allari	Also producer	
2003	Ammayilu Abbayilu		
2005	Soggadu		
2006	Party		
2007	Anasuya	Also producer	
2008	Nacchavule		
2009	Amaravathi		
2010	Manasara		
2011	Nuvvila		
2012	Avunu		
2014	Laddu Babu		
2015	Avunu 2	Also producer	
2018	Adhugo	Also producer	
2019	Aaviri	Also producer	
2021	Crrush	Also producer	
2025	Enugu Thondam Ghatikachalam		
2026	Razor		

=== As writer and producer ===
Films written or produced
Year	Title	Writer	Producer	Ref.
2023	Asalu	Yes	Yes	
2024	Rush	Yes	No	

=== As actor ===
==== Telugu films ====
Films and roles
Year	Title	Role	Notes
1998	Maavidaakulu	Muddu Krishna	
1998	Sivayya		
1998	Pellaadi Choopista		
1998	Love Story 1999		
1998	Tholi Prema	Villain	
1999	Sultan	Noor	
1999	Neti Gandhi		
1999	Hello...Yama!	Ravi	
2000	Vamshoddharakudu	Ashok	
2000	Chala Bagundi	Rapist	
2000	Jayam Manadera	Ravindra Naidu	
2001	Murari	Bulabbayyi	
2003	Ammayilu Abbayilu		
2003	Neeku Nenu Naaku Nuvvu		
2003	Simhadri		
2004	Pallakilo Pellikoothuru	Dubai Babu	
2004	Nenunnanu	Waltair Ravi	
2004	Naani	Satyam's son	
2004	Adavi Ramudu		
2006	Party	James	
2006	Annavaram	Police Inspector	
2007	Madhumasam	Maya's boss	
2007	Aata	Ravi	
2007	Lakshyam	Sattibabu	
2007	Tulasi	Ravi	
2007	Anasuya	"Gulabi Puvvu" Govind	
2008	Swagatam	Padmakar Mudumba	
2008	Kalidasu	Police Officer	
2008	Victory	Laxman Rao	
2008	Brahmanandam Drama Company		
2009	13 - Padamoodu	Inspector Shiva	
2009	Nachchav Alludu		
2009	Amaravathi	Venkat	
2010	Prateeroju		
2010	Manasara...		Cameo appearance
2011	Mayagadu		
2011	Nuvvila	SI Ranjith Kumar	
2011	Anaganaga O Dheerudu	Sudigundam	
2012	Avunu	Captain Raju / Rajender Reddy	
2012	Racha	Bellary's assistant	
2013	Seethamma Vakitlo Sirimalle Chettu	Goodu Raju	
2013	Mr. Pellikoduku		
2013	Gundello Godari	Dora Babu	
2013	Swamy Ra Ra	Durga Prasad	
2013	Anthaka Mundu Aa Tarvatha	Sridhar	
2013	Prema Oka Maikam		
2014	Alludu Seenu	Peda Prasad	
2014	Ee Varsham Sakshiga		
2014	Eduruleni Alexander	Jinnah	
2015	Avunu 2	Captain Raju / Rajender Reddy	
2015	Dohchay	CI Richard	
2015	Thanu Nenu	Keerthi's father	
2016	Dictator	Director	
2016	Savitri		
2016	Eedo Rakam Aado Rakam	Aadi Narayana	
2016	Selfie Raja	Mams	
2016	Trivikraman	Trivikraman	
2021	Thimmarusu	Varaha Murthy	
2021	Raja Raja Chora	William Reddy	
2022	Anukoni Prayanam	Sub-inspector	
2022	Khudiram Bose	Lawer	
2023	Asalu	Ranjith Rao	
2023	Changure Bangaru Raja	Gateelu	
2024	The Family Star	Loan shark	
2024	Rush	Siva	Also writer
2024	Swag	Chinnayana	
2025	Coffee with a Killer		

==== Other language films ====
Other language films and roles
Year	Title	Role	Language	Notes
1998	Mangalyam Tantunanena		Kannada	
1999	Habba	Seetha's second brother	Kannada	
2000	Durgada Huli		Kannada	
2000	Mahatma		Kannada	
2009	Yavarum Nalam	Inspector Shiva	Tamil	Bilingual film; Tamil version (Note: His scenes in the Tamil version were partially reshot in the Telugu dubbed version titled 13-Padamoodu.)
