= Chickpete Sachagalu =

- DVD cover
- Directed by: Nagendra Magudi
- Screenplay by: K S Ravindra; S. Narayan
- Dialogue by: Richard Louis
- Story by: S. Narayan
- Produced by: S. Narayan
- Starring: Jaggesh; S. Narayan
- Cinematography: Rockline Ganesh
- Edited by: P. R. Sounder Rajan
- Music by: S. Narayan
- Production company: Cheluvambika Pictures
- Release date: 9 January 2009
- Country: India
- Language: Kannada

Chickpete Sachagalu is a 2009 Indian Kannada-language comedy drama film directed by Nagendra Magudi and starring Jaggesh and S. Narayan.

== Cast ==
- Jaggesh as Jaggi
- S. Narayan as Nani
- Ashwini
- Manasi
- Saritha Jain
- Sindhu
- Doddanna
- Mukhyamantri Chandru as Chandrashekhar
- Lingenahalli Sureshchandra
- Tennis Krishna
- Sundar Raj
- R. G. Vijayasarathy

== Production ==
No media updates were given for this film due to the criticisms S. Narayan received for Chaitrada Chandrama (2008).

== Release and reception ==
The film was released on 9 January 2009 alongside Kempa, Anu and Taxi No. 1. The film was a box office failure.

A critic from IANS rated the film two out of five stars and wrote that "Chickpete Sachagalu is a good time-pass film, if you have the will to forgive all the small and big mistakes in the narration. Watch it for a few laughs but without any big expectation". A critic from Chitraloka wrote that "Chickpete Sachagalu is a laugh riot which is very good entertainment offering in the new year". On the contrary, a critic from Bangalore Mirror wrote that "But that is not the end of S Narayan; he is present throughout he is present throughout the film as one of the two leading men, the other being Jaggesh. Together they dish out the silliest, nonsensical and stale comic scenes to the viewers". R. G. Vijayasarathy of Rediff.com wrote "Jaggesh and Narayan make a good combination and have tried every trick in the book to make people laugh" and added that "Chickpete Sachagalu may not be the best comedy film but it's time pass fare".
