= List of songs recorded by Inchara Rao =

Inchara Rao made her debut in Kannada films in 2007 with Mano Murthy-composition, "Nanna Stylu Berene" from Geleya. Her rise to prominence came with the release of the song "Kareyole" from RangiTaranga (2015). The song fetched her a Filmfare Award.

== Kannada film songs ==
=== 2007 ===
Film	Song	Composer(s)	Writer(s)	Co-singer(s)	Ref.
Geleya	"Nanna Stylu Berene"	Mano Murthy	Kaviraj	Rajesh Krishnan	

=== 2013 ===
Film	Song	Composer(s)	Writer(s)	Co-singer(s)	Ref.
Bhairavi	"Ayyo Pundare"	Veer Samarth		Veer Samarth	
Appayya	"Bombayalli"	S. Narayan	S. Narayan	Chaitra H. G.	
Advaita	"Macheya Kacchi"	Veer Samarth	B. M. Giriraj	Santosh Venky	

=== 2015 ===
Film	Song	Composer(s)	Writer(s)	Co-singer(s)	Ref.
Fashion	"Fashion"	Sameer Kulkarni	Ulavi Prasad		
RangiTaranga	"Kareyole"	Anup Bhandari	Anup Bhandari		

=== 2016 ===
Film	Song	Composer(s)	Writer(s)	Co-singer(s)	Ref.
U The End A	"Baa Sanihaa"	Bharath B. J.	Manusri		
Godhi Banna Sadharana Mykattu	"Ayomaya"	Charan Raj	Dhananjay Ranjan	Siddhanth	
Sa	"Raghupati Raghava"	Veer Samarth	Hrudaya Shiva	Shashank Sheshagiri	

=== 2017 ===
Film	Song	Composer(s)	Writer(s)	Co-singer(s)	Ref.
Duniya 2	"Haneya Barahava"	B. J. Bharath			

=== 2018 ===
Film	Song	Composer(s)	Writer(s)	Co-singer(s)	Ref.
Rajaratha; Rajaratham	"Gandaka" "Chal Chal Gurram"	Anup Bhandari	Anup Bhandari; Ramajogayya Sastry	P. Ravi Shankar, Anup Bhandari	

== Other languages ==
Year	Album	Song	Language	Composer(s)	Writer(s)	Co-singer(s)	Ref.
2014	Chaali Polilu	"Madhushaale Da"	Tulu	V. Manohar			
