= Waltair Veerayya =

2023 Indian film by Bobby Kolli

- Theatrical release poster
- Directed by: Bobby Kolli
- Written by: Bobby Kolli; Kona Venkat; K. Chakravarthy Reddy
- Produced by: Naveen Yerneni; Y. Ravi Shankar
- Starring: Chiranjeevi; Ravi Teja; Shruti Haasan; Catherine Tresa; Bobby Simha; Prakash Raj
- Cinematography: Arthur A. Wilson
- Edited by: Niranjan Devaramane
- Music by: Devi Sri Prasad
- Production company: Mythri Movie Makers
- Distributed by: see below
- Release date: 13 January 2023
- Running time: 160 minutes
- Country: India
- Language: Telugu
- Budget: ₹140 crore
- Box office: est. ₹236 crore

Waltair Veerayya is a 2023 Indian Telugu-language action comedy film directed by Bobby Kolli and produced by Mythri Movie Makers. The film stars Chiranjeevi as the title character alongside Ravi Teja, Shruti Haasan, Catherine Tresa, Prakash Raj, Bobby Simha, Rajendra Prasad, and Vennela Kishore. Notorious smuggler Waltair Veerayya is recruited by RA&W to extradite a dangerous drug lord from Malaysia to India. However, the mission reveals a deeper personal vendetta involving Veerayya’s past and his relationship with his late half-brother Vikram Sagar IPS (Teja), an upright police officer.

The film was announced in August 2021. Principal photography commenced in December 2021 with filming taking place in Hyderabad, Visakhapatnam and Malaysia. The soundtrack was composed by Devi Sri Prasad with cinematography by Arthur A. Wilson and editing by Niranjan Devaramane.

Waltair Veerayya was released on 13 January 2023, coinciding with Sankranti weekend, and received mixed to positive reviews from critics. The film became commercially successful at the box office, thus becoming the third highest-grossing Telugu film of 2023.

== Plot ==
Waltair Veerayya is approached by suspended CI Seethapathi. Seethapathi offers to clear Veerayya’s debts if he captures Solomon Caesar—a violent drug baron who has escaped RAW custody—in Malaysia and returns him to India. Veerayya accepts and, accompanied by his friends and Seethapathi’s brother‑in‑law, checks into Solomon’s Kuala Lumpur hotel to hatch an abduction plan.

While scouting Solomon’s hotel, Veerayya inadvertently meets Nithya and Vaishnavi on holiday, alarming Nithya into pulling her daughter away. A rogue tailing attempt by Seethapathi’s relative ends in his capture by Solomon’s men; Veerayya rescues him and tricks Solomon into believing he is a drug buyer. At Solomon’s private party, RAW agents led by Athidhi attempt a raid, but Veerayya—unaware they are government operatives—foils them and earns Solomon’s gratitude. Promising a safe return to India, Veerayya then springs his plan: Solomon, upon discovering the ruse, tortures Athidhi on video while Michael watches. But Veerayya kills the goons and revels that he came for Michal and kills Soloman. Veerayya revels his past to Ci Seethapathi

Past:Veerayya runs an ice factory and traffics contraband under the alias “Kaala,” while Vikram rises to ACP, marries Dr. Nithya, and fathers a daughter, Vaishnavi. Drug lord Michael Caesar secretly uses Veerayya’s ice business to smuggle cocaine; when tainted ice kills 25 schoolchildren, Michael frames Veerayya and escapes to Malaysia. Vikram stages a police “encounter” to lure Michael back, but Michael’s men fatally stab Vikram—and his name is dishonorably besmirched posthumously. Nithya and Vaishnavi grieve, blaming Veerayya for both tragedies.

Present: Back in India, Veerayya engineers a feud between Michael and partner Velappan Karuppan, crippling their operations and compelling Michael’s cooperation. Overcoming his vertigo with Athidhi’s help, he safely escorts Michael to head cut in court. Michael’s testimony exonerates Veerayya, restores ACP Vikram’s honor, and acquits Veerayya of past charges. To avenge the children slain by cocaine‑laced ice—fulfilling Vikram’s dying wish—Veerayya decapitates Michael in open court. Sentenced to prison, he attends Vikram’s state honors ceremony in custody, where Nithya and Vaishnavi finally forgive him, reuniting the fractured family.

== Cast ==
- Chiranjeevi as Waltair Veerayya
- Ravi Teja as ACP Vikram Sagar IPS, Veerayya's younger brother
- Shruti Haasan as RAW Agent Athidhi, Veerayya's love interest
- Catherine Tresa as Dr. Nithya, Vikram’s wife
- Bobby Simha as Solomon Caesar, Michael’s younger brother
- Prakash Raj as Michael Caesar alias Kaala, Solomon's elder brother
- Rajendra Prasad as CI Seethapati
- Nassar as Constable Koteswara Rao, Veerayya's and Vikram's uncle
- Baby Shreshta as Vaishnavi, Vikram and Nithya’s daughter; Veerayya's niece
- Subbaraju as Edukondalu, hotel manager turned RAW Agent
- Vennela Kishore as Seethapati’s brother-in-law
- Srinivasa Reddy as Dollar Babu, Veerayya’s friend
- Saptagiri as Lekka Giri, Veerayya’s friend
- Shakalaka Shankar as Samba, Veerayya’s friend
- Pradeep Rawat as David, Veerayya’s friend
- Rajendran as Gundu Mani, Veerayya's jailmate
- Jayaprakash as High Court Judge
- Manobala as Judge K. Murthy
- Jhansi as Lawyer
- Raghu Babu as Corrupt Defense Lawyer
- Mime Gopi as Das, a goon
- John Vijay as Abdullah, Michael’s assistant
- Prabhas Sreenu as Babu
- Thagubothu Ramesh as Bilal
- B. S. Avinash as Velappan Karuppan, Michael’s business partner
- Surya as Retired officer Murthy, Seethapati’s colleague
- Kedar Shankar as Nithya’s father
- Pramodini as Seethapati’s wife
- Sathyaraj as Satyamurthy, Veerayya's and Vikram's father (Guest Appearance)
- Kalyani Natarajan as Saroja, Veerayya's and Vikram’s mother
- Praveen as Police Officer
- Anish Kuruvilla as Navy Officer
- Sharath Lohithaswa as Rayudu
- Vinay Varma as Police SP
- Vasu Inturi as Priest
- Chammak Chandra as a Goon
- Supreeth as Goon
- Vettai Muthukumar as Goon
- Mathew Varghese as Joint Commissioner Baradwaj, a corrupt officer who sides with Michael; Vikram Sagar's murderer
- Kalpa Latha as Protestor
- Urvashi Rautela as item number in the song "Boss Party" (special appearance)
- Sekhar as himself in the song "Poonakaalu Loading" (cameo appearance)
- Bobby Kolli as himself in the song "Poonakaalu Loading" (cameo appearance)

== Production ==
In August 2021, it was announced that Chiranjeevi and K. S. Ravindra (also known as Bobby) would team up for a film tentatively titled Mega154 (intended to be Chiranjeevi's 154th film) under the production of Mythri Movie Makers. The film was formally launched in November 2021. In April 2022, Chiranjeevi unintentionally revealed the film is titled Waltair Veerayya. The title was officially confirmed in October 2022. Ravindra wrote the story and dialogues, which were scripted by Kona Venkat and K. Chakravarthy Reddy. Arthur A. Wilson was signed on as the cinematographer, marking his third collaboration with Bobby, after Power and Sardaar Gabbar Singh. Niranjan Devaramane was the film's editor.

In March 2022, Ravi Teja joined the cast, reuniting with Chiranjeevi after 22 years since Annayya (2000). Teja reportedly plays his brother, a police officer disguised as a mafia don. Shruti Haasan was paired opposite Chiranjeevi, while Catherine Tresa is playing Teja's wife. Nawazuddin Siddiqui was approached to play the antagonist, but due to scheduling conflicts, he was replaced by Bobby Simha. Malayalam actor Biju Menon also been invited to play villainous roles. Prakash Raj plays another villain in the film. The role of Prakash was initially chosen by Ravindra for P. Samuthirakani, but Samuel Tiracani was still filming Bro (2023) and missed the opportunity. In early November 2022, Urvashi Rautela was roped in for doing a special appearance in a song.

Principal photography commenced in December 2021 in Hyderabad. In April 2022, the second schedule commenced with Haasan joining the sets in Vishakapatnam. Starting in the second week of June, the crew began some filming in Malaysia. In July 2022, the third schedule commenced with Teja joining the sets. Chiranevi flew to France with the film crew on December 1, 2022 to film important scenes. Filming wrapped in mid-December 2022.

== Music ==
Waltair Veerayya

Soundtrack album by Devi Sri Prasad
- Released: 11 January 2023
- Recorded: 2021–2022
- Genre: Feature film soundtrack
- Length: 17:08
- Language: Telugu
- Label: Sony Music India

Devi Sri Prasad chronology
| Cirkus (2022) | Waltair Veerayya (2023) | Kisi Ka Bhai Kisi Ki Jaan (2023) |

Singles from Waltair Veerayya
- 1. "Boss Party" Released: 23 November 2022; 2. "Sridevi Chiranjeevi" Released: 19 December 2022; 3. "Veerayya Title Song" Released: 26 December 2022; 4. "Poonakaalu Loading" Released: 30 December 2022; 5. "Neekemo Andamekkuva" Released: 11 January 2023

The film score and soundtrack are composed by Devi Sri Prasad. The audio rights were acquired by Sony Music India. The first single titled "Boss Party" was released on 23 November 2022. The second single titled "Sridevi Chiranjeevi" was released on 19 December 2022. The third single titled "Veerayya Title Song" was released on 26 December 2022. The fourth single titled "Poonakaalu Loading" was released on 30 December 2022. The fifth single titled "Neekemo Andamekkuva" was released on 11 January 2023.

Track listing
| No. | Title | Lyrics | Singer(s) | Length |
|---|---|---|---|---|
| 1. | "Boss Party" | Devi Sri Prasad | Devi Sri Prasad, Nakash Aziz, Haripriya | 3:20 |
| 2. | "Sridevi Chiranjeevi" | Devi Sri Prasad | Jaspreet Jasz, Sameera Bharadwaj | 2:58 |
| 3. | "Veerayya Title Song" | Chandrabose | Anurag Kulkarni, Pavithra Chari | 4:00 |
| 4. | "Poonakaalu Loading" | Roll Rida | Ram Miriyala, Roll Rida | 3:18 |
| 5. | "Neekemo Andamekkuva" | Ramajogayya Sastry | Mika Singh, Geetha Madhuri, Velmurugan | 3:32 |
| Total length: | | | | 17:08 |

== Release ==
=== Theatrical ===
Waltair Veerayya along with the Hindi dubbed version, was released in theaters on 13 January 2023 coinciding with the festival of Sankranti. The worldwide theatrical rights of the film were sold at a cost of ₹94 crore.

=== Distribution ===
Mythri Movie Makers will distribute this film in the Nizam region. Grandmaster and B4U are handling the Hindi distribution of this film. Shloka Entertainments has acquired the North American distribution rights to the film.

=== Home media ===
The digital and satellite rights of the film were acquired by Netflix and Gemini TV respectively. The film premiered on Netflix on 27 February 2023. The film premiered on a Tamil-language television channel on October 29, 2023, marking its world television premiere.

== Reception ==
=== Critical response ===
Waltair Veerayya received positive reviews from critics. On the review aggregator website Rotten Tomatoes, 80% of 5 critics' reviews are positive, with an average rating of 5/10.

Neeshita Nyayapati of The Times of India gave 3 out of 5 stars and wrote "Waltair Veerayya might not leave you feeling poonakalu as promised, but it’s decent enough, especially if you’re a Chiranjeevi fan or Ravi Teja’s for that matter. Just don't expect something out-of-the-box." Latha Srinivasan of India Today gave 3 out of 5 stars and wrote "Chiranjeevi's role in the film is reminiscent of his earlier films - massy, stylish, comical and full of action. Waltair Veerayya also stars Ravi Teja and Shruti Haasan, and is directed by Bobby Kolli. Chiru's fans are in for a treat." Haricharan Pudipeddi of Hindustan Times wrote "Bobby’s intention of delivering an out-and-out enjoyable commercial film with Waltair Veerayya works to a large extent, even when the predictability factor creeps in when you’re least expecting. The action sequences really serve as the film’s high moments and they deliver the thrills in a big way. These scenes do go overboard on multiple occasions but still work given the film’s massive scale." Balakrishna Ganeshan of The News Minute termed the film as "absolute mess", criticised the story and inconsistency tone of the film.

Manoj Kumar R of The Indian Express rated the film 2 out of 5 stars and wrote "The filmmakers don't want the audience to respond to the character Waltair Veerayya, but they want us to venerate before the star playing Waltair Veerayya". Arvind V of Pinkvilla rated the film 2.5 out of 5 stars and praised the performances but criticised the writing and termed comedy as "insipid" & score as "bleak". Ram Venkat Srikar of Cinema Express rated the film 3 out of 5 stars and wrote "Films like Waltair Veerayya are reminders that masala cinema, when done neatly, will always be a treat". Soundarya Athimuthu of The Quint gave the film's rating 3 out of 5 and wrote "Waltair Veerayya celebrates Chiranjeevi’s four-decade-long legacy with enjoyable characterization. It creates moments of intrigue and brilliant closures near the end".

=== Box office ===
The film grossed ₹236.15 crore worldwide. The film became Chiranjeevi's third film to cross US$2 million mark at the US box office after Sye Raa Narasimha Reddy and Khaidi No. 150.

== Accolades ==
| Award (Note: Awards, festivals and organizations are in alphabetical order.) | Date of ceremony (Note: Date is linked to the article about the awards held that year, wherever possible.) | Category | Recipient(s) | Result | Ref. |
|---|---|---|---|---|---|
| Filmfare Awards South | 3 August 2024 | Best Actor – Telugu | Chiranjeevi | Nominated | |
| Filmfare Awards South | 3 August 2024 | Best Supporting Actor – Telugu | Ravi Teja | Won | |
| Filmfare Awards South | 3 August 2024 | Best Music Director – Telugu | Devi Sri Prasad | Nominated | |
| Santosham Film Awards | 2 December 2023 | Best Action | Ram Lakshman | Won | |
| South Indian International Movie Awards | 14 September 2024 | Best Director – Telugu | Bobby Kolli | Nominated | |
| South Indian International Movie Awards | 14 September 2024 | Best Actor – Telugu | Chiranjeevi | Nominated | |
| South Indian International Movie Awards | 14 September 2024 | Best Actor in a Negative Role – Telugu | Prakash Raj | Nominated | |
| South Indian International Movie Awards | 14 September 2024 | Best Music Director – Telugu | Devi Sri Prasad | Nominated | |
