= Jai Lava Kusa (soundtrack) =

Jai Lava Kusa (Original Motion Picture Soundtrack)

Soundtrack album by Devi Sri Prasad
- Released: 3 September 2016
- Recorded: 2016
- Genre: Feature film soundtrack
- Length: 24:32
- Language: Telugu
- Label: Lahari Music
- Producer: Devi Sri Prasad

Devi Sri Prasad chronology
Jaya Janaki Nayaka (2017)	Jai Lava Kusa (Original Motion Picture Soundtrack) (2016)	Vunnadhi Okate Zindagi (2017)

Jai Lava Kusa (Original Motion Picture Soundtrack) is the soundtrack to the 2016 Telugu-language action film of the same name composed by Devi Sri Prasad and featured six songs with lyrics written by Chandrabose and Ramajogayya Sastry. The film, directed by K. S. Ravindra and stars N. T. Rama Rao Jr in a triple role, alongside Raashi Khanna and Nivetha Thomas. The soundtrack was released under the Lahari Music label on 3 September 2016 at a formal press event. The album was positively received by critics with praise for the compositions.

== Development ==
On 8 February 2016, the producers announced that Devi Sri Prasad would compose the film's music and background score. The film would mark his second collaboration with Ravindra after Sardaar Gabbar Singh (2016) and Naa Alludu (2005), Rakhi (2006), Adhurs (2010), Oosaravelli (2011), Nannaku Prematho and Janatha Garage (both 2016). Prasad composed six songs for the film with lyrics written by Chandrabose and Ramajogayya Sastry and performed by Divya Kumar, Jaspreet Jasz, Ranina Reddy, Hemachandra, Nakash Aziz, Neha Bhasin, Devi Sri Prasad and Vishwaprasad M Ganagi amongst others.

Bhasin recorded the item number "Swing Zara" featuring Tamannaah. She recalled that, "Devi (Sri Prasad) always comes up with something crazy and unpredictable in his compositions" where she was asked to sing like a "sexy, rowdy girl" for the song. Prasad suggested that Tamannaah should not smile as the song has a trancy vibe. He discussed with Sekhar on using specific sounds, where the choreographer insisted him to use cymbals and claps which he added afterwards. Chandrabose penned the "Ravana" song in 90 minutes.

== Release ==
The film's audio launch was tentatively scheduled for 23 March 2016 but was pushed to September. The producers later announced that the film's music launch, which is scheduled to be held on 3 September, would be cancelled due to the unpleasant weather prevailing across Hyderabad and denied security keeping with the Ganesh Nimarjan in mind. Instead, a formal press meet was held with the presence of the cast and crew. The album was released directly through music streaming platforms and in YouTube by Lahari Music. The jukebox crossed 1 million views within 24 hours of its release.

The original soundtrack consisted of four songs with the initial release. A 40-second promo of the song "Swing Zara" was released on 12 September, and the full song was released on 15 September. The song "Andamaina Lokam" was released separately on 24 September, after the film's release.

== Reception ==
According to critic Mrudula Ramadugu of Firstpost, "This NTR and Devi Sri Prasad combination turned out better than their previous stint in Janatha Garage, but the album as a package does not surpass the music from the director’s past hit tracks, from films like Mirchi, Gabbar Singh, Arya 2 etc." Indiaglitz described the album as a "The album is surely not a one-man show. It's a five-men show – DSP, Chandrabose, Jai, Lava and Kusa." 123Telugu reviewed as "a decent outing for Devi Sri Prasad". Karthik Srinivasan of Milliblog wrote "Jai Lava Kusa is Devi Sri Prasad sleepwalking through yet another soundtrack." Sridhar Adivi of The Times of India wrote: "The songs of Jai Lava Kusa are not exceptional but neither are they harsh on the ear." Vikram Venkateswaran of The Quint describe the music as "forgettable" except for Raavana's theme. "Raavana" was described as the best Telugu song of 2017.

== Track listing ==
Jai Lava Kusa (Original Motion Picture Soundtrack) track listing
No.	Title	Lyrics	Artist(s)	Length
1.	"Vishwa Vishwa Nayaka"	Chandrabose	Divya Kumar	4:20
2.	"Swapna Sundari Swarna Manjari"	Ramajogayya Sastry	Jaspreet Jasz, Ranina Reddy	4:23
3.	"Nee Kallalona Kaatuka"	Chandrabose	Hemachandra	3:58
4.	"Mee Kashtalanni"	Chandrabose	Nakash Aziz	4:12
5.	"Swing Zara"	Ramajogayya Sastry	Neha Bhasin, Devi Sri Prasad, M. M. Manasi	4:22
6.	"Andamaina Lokam"	Chandrabose	Vishwaprasad M Ganagi	3:17
Total length:				24:32

== Accolades ==
Accolades for Jai Lava Kusa (Original Motion Picture Soundtrack)
Award (Note: Awards are in Alphabetical order.)	Date of ceremony (Note: Date is linked to the article about the awards held that year, wherever possible.)	Category	Recipient(s)	Result	Ref.
Filmfare Awards South	16 June 2018	Best Lyricist – Telugu	Chandrabose – ("Ravana")	Nominated	
Filmfare Awards South	16 June 2018	Best Female Playback Singer – Telugu	Neha Bhasin – ("Swing Zara")	Nominated	
South Indian International Movie Awards	14–15 September 2018	Best Female Playback Singer – Telugu	Neha Bhasin – ("Swing Zara")	Nominated	
