= Rocky (2008 film) =

2008 Indian film by S. K. Nagendra Urs

- Poster
- Directed by: S. K. Nagendra Urs
- Written by: Harish Shrunga
- Screenplay by: S. K. Nagendra Urs
- Story by: Vijay Chendoor
- Produced by: M K Anand Kumar; K L Thimmappa Raju; Mekala Narayanaswamy
- Starring: Yash; Bianca Desai; Santhosh
- Cinematography: S. R. Sudhakar
- Edited by: S. K. Nagendra Urs
- Music by: Venkat - Narayan
- Production company: T N Films
- Release date: 25 December 2008
- Running time: 152 minutes
- Country: India
- Language: Kannada

Rocky is a 2008 Indian Kannada-language romantic drama film directed by S. K. Nagendra Urs. The film stars Yash and newcomer Bianca Desai along with Jai Jagadish, Ramesh Bhat and Santhosh in other pivotal roles.

The film featured an original score and soundtrack composed by Venkat-Narayan. S. P. Balasubrahmanyam has sung a duet with Priyadarshini which was his last for the younger generation hero and also from this movie actor Yash got the name "Rocky", which was the inspiration for the "Rocky Bhai" character. Rocky met with negative response with most critics who tried to compare it to films from other languages.

== Plot ==
Rocky (Yash) is a young college student raised in an unloving home. Usha (Bianca Desai) comes from a loving home but lost her mother in death. They meet on her first day of college and it is love at first sight for Rocky. Usha agrees to be friends and Rocky hides his feelings for her. One day he is dismayed to find that Usha has an overwhelming fan crush on a classical guitarist named Vishwas (Aryan). Thinking that he is helping Usha, Rocky tries to arrange for them to meet. Vishwas makes this difficult for Rocky because he believes that he is being sent by the enemies of his don brother (Raju) to harass him. Finally Rocky sees them together and is happy with his work until he realizes that Vishwas is starting to believe that he is in love with Usha. The competition between the two increases until Usha herself realizes that she herself is actually in love with one of them.

== Cast ==
- Yash as Rocky
- Bianca Desai as Usha
- Santhosh Aryan as Vishwas, the concert guitarist
- K. L. Thimmappa Raju as Nanda the don
- Jai Jagadish as Rocky's father
- Ramesh Bhat as Usha's father
- Padmaja Rao as Rocky's mother
- Karibasavaiah as the college principal
- Girija Lokesh
- M. N. Lakshmi Devi as Ajji, Usha's grandmother
- Mithra as Soda, Rocky's sidekick

== Soundtrack ==
The music was composed by Venkat-Narayan and the audio was sold on the Skanda Audio label.

Track listing
No.	Title	Lyrics	Singer(s)	Length
1.	"Snehada Chiguru"	Panchajanya	S. P. Balasubrahmanyam, Priyadarshini
2.	"Olla Ollare Olla"	M. S. Santhosh Kumar	Kunal Ganjawala
3.	"20-20 Balle Balle"	Santhosh Ananddram	Devi Sri Prasad, Panchajanya
4.	"Kareyale Ninna"	Jayant Kaikini	Hariharan
5.	"Ring Ring"	Kaviraj	Karthik
6.	"Manase Manase"	Harish Shringa	Sonu Nigam
7.	"Kareyale Ninna"	Jayant Kaikini	Narayan

== Reception ==
=== Critical response ===
R. G. Vijayasarathy of Rediff.com scored the film at 1 out of 5 stars and wrote "Music director Venkat and Narayan score two strong numbers like Valla Vallare and the title song. Dialogue writer Vijay Chendur has written crisp dialogues. But the senseless story makes the film a failure. Cameraman Sudhakar comes off good with his camera work". A critic from Bangalore Mirror wrote "Yash gets a better film to work on next time. If it is a khichidi of other films Nagendra wants to direct, he had better stick to his forte of editing. And please Nagendra, do not play those silly cameo roles".
