= Daksha (film) =

- Directed by: S. Narayan
- Written by: S. Narayan
- Produced by: S. Narayan
- Starring: Duniya Vijay
- Cinematography: G. Renukumar
- Edited by: Nagaraj G. Harasuru
- Music by: S. Narayan
- Production company: Cheluvambika Pictures
- Release date: 24 April 2015
- Running time: 122 minutes
- Country: India
- Language: Kannada

Daksha is a 2015 Indian Kannada-language action thriller film directed and produced by S. Narayan. It stars Duniya Vijay in the titular role, alongside Pankaj Narayan, Neha Patil, Raghav Uday, Suchendra Prasad, Shobaraj, Rangayana Raghu and Bullet Prakash in supporting roles.

Daksha was shot in a single take.

== Plot ==
Daksha is an Indian Army commando who is returning home for his engagement until he learns that Chief Justice Venkatesha Murthy and his family are held captive by a group of terrorists led by Mustafa and his brother Saleem, who wanted Murthy to deliver a favourable verdict in a case related to one of their operatives. Daksha sneaks into the house and manages to save Murthy and his family and soon eliminates Mustafa, Saleem and their henchmen.

== Cast ==
- Duniya Vijay as Daksha
- Pankaj Narayan
- Neha Patil
- Rangayana Raghu
- Shobaraj as Mustafa
- Abhijith
- Bullet Prakash
- Suchendra Prasad as Venkatesha Murthy
- Padmaja Rao
- Uday

== Production ==
The film was shot on 17 April 2014 after 7 pm in a palace in Hebbal and the shoot finished in a single shot after two hours and twenty minutes. The makers of the film tried to contact the Guinness World Records although several films made in a single shot had already been released.

== Soundtrack ==
The music was composed by S. Narayan. The music was released under the Anand Audio music label.

Track listing
No.	Title	Singer(s)	Length
1.	"Birugaalige"	Naveen	4:13
2.	"Iyarkai Thaaye"	Haricharan, Shweta Mohan	4:07
Total length:			8:20

== Reception ==
A critic from Deccan Herald wrote that "Watch Daksha for Duniya Vijay, his jingoistic Vande Mantaram cry and a one-shot solution to terrorism." A critic from The New Indian Express wrote that "However, whether their risk-taking impulse lasts for the length of the film remains to be seen. Nonetheless kudos to the entire team to try and give a different flavour to an oft told story". A critic from The Times of India wrote that "The film, which begins on an intense note, loses fizz midway and ends on expected lines". A critic from The Hindu wrote that "Narayan and Duniya Vijay disappoint the audience with a weak story, screenplay and poor editing. A little effort could have made the film authentic, as terrorists look like local goons in their attire and body language".

== See also ==
- Single shot films
