= Chellidaru Sampigeya =

- Directed by: S. Narayan
- Screenplay by: S. Narayan
- Based on: Chandamama (2007) by Krishna Vamsi
- Produced by: S. Narayan
- Starring: Prashanth; Bianca Desai; Anant Nag; Vishwas; Spoorthi
- Cinematography: Jagadish Vali
- Edited by: P. R. Sounder Rajan
- Music by: S. Narayan
- Production company: Cheluvaambika Pictures
- Release date: 24 April 2009
- Country: India
- Language: Kannada

Chellidaru Sampigeya is a 2009 Indian Kannada-language film co-written, produced, and directed by S. Narayan. A remake of the Telugu film Chandamama (2007), the film stars Prashanth, Bianca Desai, Anant Nag, Vishwas, and Spoorthi.

== Cast ==
- Prashanth as Potha Raju
- Bianca Desai as Soumya
- Anant Nag as Swami Gowda
- Vishwas as Kishore
- Spoorthi
- Doddanna as Made Gowda
- Sundar Raj
- R. G. Vijayasarathy
- P. N. Sathya
- M. N. Suresh (uncredited)

== Production ==
The muhurat of the film took place on 10 December 2008. Vishal Hegde and Shruthi of Udaya TV were initially cast in the film before two newcomers were cast.

== Soundtrack ==
The music was composed and written by S. Narayan.

Track listing
No.	Title	Singer(s)	Length
1.	"Gelathi"	Kunal Ganjawala, Shreya Ghoshal	4:36
2.	"Yaarivalu"	Haricharan, Shamitha Malnad	4:58
3.	"Are Are Hrudaya"	Kumar Sanu, K. S. Chithra	5:11
4.	"Kukkoo Kogile"	Chetan Sosca	4:47
5.	"Warrant"	Shaan, Shamitha Malnad, Nirmal	5:33
6.	"Jajiya Male Bindu"	Manikka Vinayagam, Chethan, Shamitha Malnad	5:24
Total length:			30:29

== Reception ==
R. G. Vijayasarathy of Rediff.com rated the film 3/5 stars noting "The film engages you throughout its length and the sequences leading to the climax will keep you on the edge of your seats". A critic from Chitraloka.com wrote "Chellidharoo Sampigeyaa is a film that is a clean entertainer and it should not be missed". However, Manju Shettar of Mid-Day gave the film 2/5 stars citing "The script is downright awful at times. So are the camerawork and music of the movie" and called it "silly light-hearted film".
