= Thayiya Madilu =

- Directed by: S. Narayan
- Written by: K S Ravindra; S. Narayan
- Produced by: Bhagyavathi
- Starring: Shiva Rajkumar; Rakshita; Jayasudha; Doddanna
- Cinematography: PKH Das
- Edited by: P. R. Soundar Raj
- Music by: S. A. Rajkumar
- Production company: Vidyadhare Combines (P) Ltd
- Release date: 12 January 2007
- Running time: 164 minutes
- Country: India
- Language: Kannada

Thayiya Madilu (transl. In the lap of mother) is a 2007 Indian Kannada-language drama film directed and written by S. Narayan. The film stars Shiva Rajkumar, Rakshita and Jayasudha. The film was produced by Narayan's home production while the original score and soundtrack were composed by S. A. Rajkumar.

The film was the first release of the year 2007 and it was an average grosser at the box-office. Critics lauded the performances of the lead actors and termed it a spectacular treat. The lead actress Rakshita announced her retirement from acting after this film.

== Cast ==
- Shiva Rajkumar as Nanda Kumar
- Rakshita as Deepa
- Jayasudha as Nanda Kumar's mother
- Avinash
- Doddanna as Nanda Kumar's stepfather
- Vinaya Prasad
- Mukhyamantri Chandru
- Sihi Kahi Chandru
- Shobaraj
- Girija Lokesh
- Mandeep Roy

== Soundtrack ==
The music of the film was composed by S. A. Rajkumar and lyrics written by S. Narayan. A song was sung by Shiva Rajkumar and shot in Chikmagalur. Three songs were shot in the Austria, Berlin, and the Egyptian pyramids, respectively. An audio release function was held on 29 November 2006 in Kolar in the presence of H. D. Kumaraswamy's friend T. Venkatesh.

Thayiya Madilu

Soundtrack album by S. A. Rajkumar
- Released: 29 November 2006
- Genre: Feature film soundtrack
- Label: Jhankar Music

No.	Title	Lyrics	Singer(s)	Length
1.	"Yeke Heegaitho"	S. Narayan	Shivarajkumar, Shreya Ghoshal
2.	"Thumbalare"	S. Narayan	S. A. Rajkumar
3.	"Malavalli Malli"	S. Narayan	Tippu, K. S. Chithra
4.	"Aparanji"	S. Narayan	Shankar Mahadevan, Shreya Ghoshal
5.	"Usirerida Devi"	S. Narayan	Haricharan
6.	"Nannavale Nannavale"	S. Narayan	Kunal Ganjawala, Shreya Ghoshal

== Reception ==
=== Critical response ===
A critic from Indiaglitz rated the film seven out of ten and wrote that "This is a film with sentiments, suspense, action and good songs which you cannot miss". A critic from Filmibeat wrote that "Thaayiya Madilu entertains the entire family with its good package of sentiment, comedy and action. There is a good story as a big foundation which is built around some well presented commercial elements which makes the film appeal to both classes and masses".
