= Suryavamsha (film) =

1999 film by S. Narayan

- Directed by: S. Narayan
- Written by: S Narayan
- Story by: Vikraman
- Based on: Suryavamsam (Tamil)
- Produced by: Anitha Kumaraswamy
- Starring: Vishnuvardhan; Isha Koppikar; Vijayalakshmi
- Cinematography: M. Rajendra
- Edited by: P. R. Soundar Raju
- Music by: V. Manohar
- Production company: Chennambika Films
- Release date: 11 June 1999
- Running time: 167 minutes
- Country: India
- Language: Kannada
- Box office: 15 crore

Suryavamsha (English : Solar Dynasty) is a 1999 Indian Kannada-language drama film directed by S. Narayan and written by Vikraman. The film stars Vishnuvardhan in dual role with Lakshmi and Isha Koppikar (in her Kannada debut). The film's score and soundtrack are composed by V. Manohar. The movie completed silver jubilee run and collected 15 crores at the box-office. The movie is a remake of 1997 Tamil movie Surya Vamsam.

== Plot ==
The story is set in rural India. Satyamurthy is Pandavapura's Gram panchayat Sarpanch and "Suryavamsha" aristocrat. A strained relationship exists between Satyamurthy and his youngest son, illiterate Kanakamurthy (Vishnuvardhan, in a dual role). His other son Kanakamurthy holds his father in the highest of respect. His closest confidant is his mother's brother Dodda.

A visitor named Padma whose brother gets engaged to Kanakamurthy's sister visits their ancestral home. The house treats Satyamurthy's son Kanakamurthy like a servant, which she notices. Her brother marries Kanakamurthy's sister in a grand event. Dodda says Kanakamurthy's low grades and duncedom angered his strict father. Kanakamurthy develops affection for Parimala from his school days and Satyamurthy adopts her after her parents die. Kanakamurthy beats a teacher in anger for punishing Parimala and flees with Parimala after which Kanakamurthy never returns to school, but Parimala studied and kept him close.

Satyamurthy arranges Kanakamurthy and Parimala's wedding assuming they both are in love with each other. Parimala attempts suicide after her wedding is arranged with Kanakamurthy but Kanakamurthy saves her. Parismala's "love" for Kanakamurthy was fake. She devalued illiterate Kanakamurthy and would never marry him and is cordial with him only because his father raised her and sponsored her education as a sign of gratitude which Kanakamurthy mistook for love.

Dodda's sad story about Kanakamurthy makes compassionate Padma fall in love with him, but he doesn't return her love. However, persistent Padma convinces Kanakamurthy to overcome his past and they fall in love.

Padma later writes to Kanakamurthy that her parents arrange her wedding to Karigowda's son. Karigowda, Satyamurthy's archenemy, plans to destroy the Suryavamsha family by forming ties with Padma's family and forcing her wealthy lawyer father to support him. Padma is against the marriage and wants Kanaka to come and stop the wedding

Satyamurthy is advised to keep Kanakamurthy away from Padma because her mother strongly disapproves of their marriage. Satyamurthy says if Kanakamurthy leaves Padma, he will accept Kanakamurthy back as his son. Dodda convinces Kanakamurthy to accept Padma by saying her love for him is genuine and heartfelt. Kanakamurthy takes Padma to a temple after gatecrashing her wedding with Karigowda's son and rescuing her, as advised by Dodda and marries her. After receiving the news of Kanaka's marriage to Padma and when Kanakamurthy brings Padma to his home, it drives Satyamurthy with anger and he disowns both Kanakamurthy and Padma.

Padma and Kanakamurthy live at nearby village. Padma's uncle (Mukhyamantri Chandru) funds and helps Kanakamurthy to start a successful bus service in his father's name. Padma studies for I.A.S on the persistence of her husband. Kanakamurthy becomes a richer businessman than his father, and Padma becomes district collector. They have son.

At school accidentally Satyamurthy meets Kanakamurthy and Padma's son and admires his values. He discovers the child is Kanakamurthy and Padma's son. Satyamurthy befriends his grandson without Kanakamurthy and Padma's knowledge, or his family knowing. Kanakamurthy is both surprised and pleased that his son is talking to Satyamurthy after his son discloses that he has a new friend. The opening of Kanakamurthy's father's dream charity hospital for the poor is secretly attended by their family. Kanakamurthy shocks his father by saying he respects him and Satyamurthy leaves with immense pride and respect for his even though his wife sees him.

Kanakamurthy gives his son canned kheer to give it to Satyamurthy when he sees him next to show his love. Kanakamurthy's mother Lakshmi finds Satyamurthy secretly meeting his grandson and urges him to reconcile. His wife's words make Satyamurthy realise his mistake. Satyamurthy vomits blood after eating kheer before talking to Kanakamurthy. Hospitalized Satyamurthy is critically ill.

Hospital is full of Satyamurthy fans. Karigowda proves that the poisoned kheer was from Kanakamurthy and hr tried to kill his father in an act of venegence. Karigowda then orders his henchmen to kill Kanakamurthy and to destroy his arch enemy Sathyamurthy's family. Satyamurthy rescues Kanakamurthy from Karigowda's men. Satyamurthy tells the crowd Karigowda poisoned Kanakamurthy's kheer as he smells perfume in his car which he believes to be Karigowda's. A repentant Satyamurthy reconciles with Kanakamurthy and ends his war with Karigowda. He apologizes to his son and begs for forgiveness after which Satyamurthy and Kanakamurthy fight Karigowda and his men.

The movie ends with the whole family reconciling

== Cast ==
- Vishnuvardhan as Sathyamurthy and Kanakamurthy (dual role)
- Isha Koppikar as Padma
- Vijayalakshmi as Parimala
- Lakshmi as Sathyamurthy's wife
- Hema Choudhary as Padma's mother
- Ramesh Bhat as Padma's father
- Doddanna as Dodda, Kanakamurthy's uncle
- Mukhyamantri Chandru as Padma's uncle (military man)
- S. Narayan as Athmananda (special appearance)
- M. N. Suresh as Chikka: Kanaka's assistant
- Lakshman Rao as Karigowda: rival of Sathya Murthy
- Tension Nagaraj
- Girish Kamplapura
- Vijayakashi
- Sunitha Shetty
- V. Lakshmi
- Master U.P. Chandan as son Kanakamurthy
- R. G. Vijayasarathy

== Production ==
After watching the Tamil film Surya Vamsam, Kumaraswamy decided to remake it in Kannada with Vishnuvardhan. The film was launched on 28 February at Pollachi, Tamilnadu. Krishnappa, the president of the Karnataka Development Board switched on the camera while M. Varadegowda, Karnataka State Employment and Training Minister sounded the clap.

== Soundtrack ==
All music are scored by V. Manohar and lyrics by S. Narayan and Doddarangegowda.

Sl No.	Song title	Singer(s)
1	"Sevanthiye Sevanthiye" (Male)	S. P. Balasubrahmanyam
2	"O Meghagala Baagilali"	Rajesh Krishnan, K. S. Chitra
3	"Onde Ondu Question"	Vishnuvardhan, Ritisha Padmanabh
4	"Pancharangi"	S. P. Balasubrahmanyam, K. S. Chitra
5	"Belli Chukki Baaninalli"	Rajesh Krishnan, Nanditha
6	"Sevanthiye Sevanthiye" (Female)	K. S. Chitra

== Reception ==
V. Maheswara Reddy of The New Indian Express wrote that "Director S Narayan has done an excellent job not only in direction but also in screenplay, dialogues and lyrics" and added that "Though Vishnuvardhan has acted as the father and son, he excels in the former role. Isha Koppikar, who is making her debut, is charming and carries off the dance sequences gracefully. V Manohar provides some lilting music and cinematographer M Rajendra has done a good job".

== Box office ==
The film was a blockbuster and had a theatrical run of more than two hundred days at theaters across Karnataka. The movie completed silver jubilee run and collected 15 crores at the box-office.
