= Galate Aliyandru =

- VCD cover
- Directed by: S. Narayan
- Screenplay by: S. Narayan
- Story by: Sundar C
- Based on: Ullathai Allitha (Tamil)
- Produced by: Anitha Kumaraswamy
- Starring: Shiva Rajkumar; Sakshi Shivanand; Tara; S. Narayan
- Cinematography: R. Giri
- Edited by: P. R. Soundar Raj
- Music by: Deva
- Production company: Chennambika Films
- Release date: 29 September 2000
- Running time: 160 minutes
- Country: India
- Language: Kannada

Galate Aliyandru (transl. Commotional Son-in-law) is a 2000 Indian Kannada-language comedy film, directed by S. Narayan and produced by Anitha Kumaraswamy. This film stars Shiva Rajkumar, Sakshi Shivanand (in her Kannada debut), S. Narayan and Tara whilst Doddanna and Mukhyamantri Chandru play other pivotal roles.

The original score and soundtrack was composed by Deva. The film is a remake of Tamil film Ullathai Allitha (1996) which itself was heavily inspired by the Hindi film Andaz Apna Apna. The film was declared a success upon release.

== Cast ==
- Shiva Rajkumar as Manu
- Sakshi Shivanand as Indu
- S. Narayan as Nandakumar
- Tara as Marigowda's secretary
- Doddanna as Malavalli Marigowda and Madegowda
- Mukhyamantri Chandru as Colonel Vishwanath
- Shobharaj
- Karibasavaiah as KB
- Mandeep Roy as Baby
- Deepti Bhatnagar cameo in song "Teenage Hudugi"

== Production ==
The filming was held at Mauritius.

== Soundtrack ==
The music was composed by Deva. The lyrics were written by K. Kalyan and S. Narayan. The songs "Sagariye Sagariye" and "Laila Laila" became hits.

#	Title	Singer(s)	Lyrics
1	"Laila Laila"	Mano	K. Kalyan
2	"Saiyaare Hoye"	S. P. Balasubrahmanyam, K. S. Chithra	S. Narayan
3	"Sagariye Sagariye"	S. P. Balasubrahmanyam, K. S. Chithra	K. Kalyan
4	"Kundapurada Meenamma"	Rajesh Krishnan, L. N. Shastry, Shivrajkumar	S. Narayan
5	"Thillana Thillana"	Suresh Peters	S. Narayan
6	"Mavaiah Mavaiah"	Doddanna, Mano, Nanditha	S. Narayan

== Reception ==
A critic from Chitraloka.com wrote that "It is like moving the mountain to a man. The noted producer H.D.Kumaraswamy has once again expressed his strong niche for good quality of Kannada films. The high production value the film consists is a feast to the eyes of the audience". A critic from indiainfo.com wrote that "The only things in the movie which can attract the movie goers is the songs and shots taken at Mauritius, though Giri's photography is not that captivating. The film which should have been a full length comedy, fails due to various reasons, though at times Doddanna, Chandru and the hero try to pull it out of the rut". go4i wrote "If the film were trimmed of the excess fat, it would have been a first-rate comedy. In the current format it ends up as an average time-pass".
