= 5D (film) =

2024 Indian thriller film

- Theatrical release poster
- Directed by: S. Narayan
- Screenplay by: S. Narayan
- Story by: Ravi Guntimadugu
- Produced by: Swathi Kumar
- Starring: Aditya; Aditi Prabhudeva; S. Narayan
- Cinematography: Kumar Gowda SK
- Edited by: Shivu Yadav
- Music by: S. Narayan
- Production company: One To Hundred
- Release date: 16 February 2024
- Running time: 129 minutes
- Country: India
- Language: Kannada

5D is a 2024 Indian Kannada-language suspense thriller film co-written and directed by S. Narayan. The film was produced by Swathi Kumar under the banner One To Hundred. The film stars himself, Aditya and Aditi Prabhudeva.

5D was released theatrically on 16 February 2024 to mixed reviews from critics.

== Cast ==
- Aditya
- Aditi Prabhudeva
- S. Narayan as Abhinandan
- Jyothi Rai

== Production ==
Ravi Guntimadugu developed the story with Aditya in mind for the lead role. Aditi Prabhudeva was chosen to portray the role of an auto-rickshaw driver in this film. Principal photography began on 1 January 2021, with a muhurat shot pooja held on New Year's Day in Bangalore. Filming was halted due to the COVID-19 lockdown but resumed in July 2021 and concluded in August 2021. The film was primarily shot in Bangalore. This film marks the fiftieth directorial venture of S. Narayan, who typically helms family dramas, marking a departure into the thriller genre. The film also represents Aditya's twenty-fifth acting project. The cinematography was by Kumar Gowda SK, while the editing was handled by Shivu Yadav.

== Music ==
The music was composed by S. Narayan, who also wrote the lyrics.

Track listing
No.	Title	Singer(s)	Length
1.	"Amma Amma"	Karthik	6:10
2.	"Pisu Pisu Mathu"	Sonu Nigam	4:44
Total length:			10:54

== Release ==
The film was originally supposed to be released in 2023, but it was delayed and rescheduled for 9 February 2024. However, the release date was changed again, and it was released on 16 February 2024.

== Reception ==
Vinay Lokesh of The Times of India rated the film two-and-a-half out of five stars and wrote that "The story itself is very outdated and the treatment of the subject is very conventional. Adithya's performance is the only saving grace. Aditi Prabhudeva's character doesn't have any impact on the story. Even the songs are average." Raisa Nasreen of Times Now gave it three out of five stars and wrote that "No one will be able to guess the twist in the climax. It will be the highlight of the film."

A critic from Vijaya Karnataka rated the film three out of five stars and opined that the film lacks a gripping screenplay as well as S. Narayan's music, which is not favourable for the film. A Sharadhaa of Cinema Express wrote, "5D offers a refreshing departure from Narayan's signature style, in a way that still satisfies his fans, with a darker and more intense narrative than his previous endeavors."
