= Chaitrada Chandrama =

- Directed by: S. Narayan
- Written by: K S Ravindra; S. Narayan
- Produced by: Bhagyavathi
- Starring: Pankaj; Amoolya; Shobharaj
- Cinematography: Renukumar; Matthew Rajan
- Edited by: P. R. Soundar Rajan
- Music by: S. Narayan
- Production company: Cheluvambika Pictures
- Release date: 6 September 2008
- Running time: 154 minutes
- Country: India
- Language: Kannada

Chaitrada Chandrama (transl: Spring's moon) is a 2008 Indian Kannada sports drama film directed, written and composed by S. Narayan. The film features his son Pankaj, making his debut, and Amoolya. Shobharaj and Veena Sunder play other pivotal roles. The plot follows Pankaaj Kumar, a prolific domestic cricketer who falls in love with a girl in his class. But when he gets an Indian national team call up, he elopes with his girlfriend, which angers the girlfriend's father, who challenges Pankaaj to score a century on his debut to win his daughter.

== Plot ==
The plot sees Pankaaj Kumar, a prolific domestic cricketer with the record of staying unbeaten (not out) for 63 consecutive innings. He is a right handed aggressive batsman and an abusive medium pace bowler. But in one match, a girl distracts him which makes the bowler dismiss him. Angered that he was dismissed, Pankaaj goes to the girl's class and slaps her in front of everyone. This hate relationship soon blossoms into love, and the two start to date. Soon, Pankaaj gets an India call up. His parents are very proud of him, and he is very happy, but instead of going to Mumbai to join the Indian national team, he goes to Kashmir with his girlfriend, where he dances with her. When they return, the girl's father beats Pankaaj mercilessly, angered at the fact that he was dating his daughter. Pankaaj's mother reminds Pankaaj that he is also a cricketer. The girlfriend's father challenges Pankaaj to score a century in his debut match to win his daughter, otherwise, they will have to breakup forever. The father says that even one run less than a century wouldn't do. The Indian cricket board team selection committee holds a meeting to finalize the playing XI for the U-19 world Cup semi final. Pankaaj's trainer/mentor advises Pankaaj to be selected, to which the others rightfully argue that he is very irresponsible. Pankaaj's trainer replies to all this with, "Now he's a good boy." They select Pankaaj in the XI. Before the match, Pankaaj gets into a street fight and is badly injured. With such injuries, he wouldn't be able to play. His trainer advises him to not play, to which he replies with, "I love my nation", and plays in the match. The India U-19 vs Australia U-19 match starts. The Aussies go to a flying start, as they completely destroy the Indian bowlers. Pankaaj is hit for consecutive boundaries, as his injury prevents him from bowling good deliveries. Finally Pankaaj gets a wicket. He celebrates wildly. India then makes a comeback into the match, and eventually restrict the Aussies to 215/8 in 50 overs. It is seen on the scorecard that the semi-final has been converted to a final. Soon. the chase begins, and Pankaaj comes out to bat. He has a shaky start, as he is first hit by a bouncer, and then almost run out while taking a run, but he soon settles and starts scoring quickly. Meanwhile wickets keep falling from the other end and it seems like both India and Pankaaj will lose. Eventually, Pankaaj is dismissed by an Aussie bowler, and everyone is shocked and heartbroken. As he accepts the situation and walks back, the umpire signals a no ball, meaning Pankaaj is not out. He once again comes out to bat. Then Pankaaj gets motivated by seeing his mother and starts destroying the Aussie bowling. With 17 required of 5 balls, Pankaaj takes two runs, then hits a huge six and two back to back boundaries. The scorecard then appears to have the target as 215, which is what Australia scored. With 1 run required of 1 ball, and Pankaaj batting on 96, he decides to go for a six, instead of a four, to win the girlfriend's father's heart. He hits the ball high up in the air, and the fielder takes a sharp catch near the boundary line, but it is revealed that he took the catch outside the boundary rope, which meant it was a six. India wins, Pankaaj wins, and he gets the girlfriend back.

== Cast ==
- Pankaj Narayan as Pankaj Kumar
- Amoolya as Ammu
- Shobaraj
- Veena Sundar
- P. N. Sathya
- Pallakki Radhakrishna as Pankaj's father
- Vijay Jatti
- Jayashree Raj
- Guruprasad
- Manjunath
- Amarnath Gowda
- Janatha Ramu

== Soundtrack ==
The music was composed and written by S. Narayan for Anand Audio company.

Track listing
No.	Title	Lyrics	Singer(s)	Length
1.	"Hey Crazy Boys"	S. Narayan	Tippu
2.	"Milana Kaano"	S. Narayan	Chetan Sosca, K. S. Chithra
3.	"Mandaarave"	S. Narayan	Shreya Ghoshal
4.	"Nanna Cheluve"	S. Narayan	Suresh Iyer, Shreya Ghoshal
5.	"Nooraru Janmada"	S. Narayan	Kunal Ganjawala, Sunidhi Chauhan
6.	"O Jeevada Gelathi"	S. Narayan	Srinivas, K. S. Chithra

== Reception ==
The film met with largely average and negative reviews upon release. The stadium CGI kept disappearing and appearing in the scenes where the U-19 Final match was taking place, thereby leading to times where an empty ground would be shown. Instead of hiring foreign actors to play the Australian players, Indian actors were used instead. Sify.com noted, "Chaitrada Chandrama falls flat as the story is outdated, the length is a big bore and maturity is lacking in key artistes". A critic from Bangalore Mirror wrote that "Lots of unnecessary scenes drag the film to an irritating length".
