= Brinda Parekh =

Indian actress and model

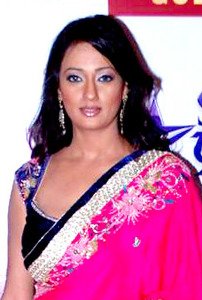
- Parekh at Marathi Music Awards in 2013
- Born: Brinda Parekh; Mumbai, India
- Other name: Brinda Parikh
- Years active: 2002-2013

Brinda Parekh is an Indian former actress and model. She has acted in South Indian films and has also done item numbers in Tamil, Telugu, Kannada and Hindi films. She has acted in 4 movies in Tamil, several other movies in Telugu and Kannada and 3 Hindi movies.

== Career ==
Being born and brought up in Mumbai, she started her career from modelling in television commercials like Vimal Suitings, Microsoft Windows XP, Anchor Switches, VIP Frenchie, Kit Kat, Thumbs Up, Polo Mint, Royal Challenge Beer, Amul Macho Vests, etc., and hundreds of other brands in print media as well. Before entering films she appeared in music videos.

== Filmography ==
Year	Movie	Role	Language	Notes
2002	Sontham		Telugu	
2004	Manmadhan	Renuka Menon	Tamil	
2005	Nammanna		Kannada	Special appearance
2005	Thirudiya Idhayathai		Tamil	Special appearance
2006	Sudesi		Tamil	Special appearance
2006	Suyetchai MLA		Tamil	Special appearance
2006	Corporate		Hindi	
2007	Pokkiri	Mona	Tamil	
2007	Viyyalavari Kayyalu		Telugu	Special appearance
2007	Polladhavan		Tamil	Special appearance
2008	Buddhivanta	Rekha Vijay Mithal	Kannada	
2009	Guru En Aalu	Sheila Krishna	Tamil	
2009	London Dreams		Hindi	
2009	Ek Se Bure Do		Hindi	
2009	Thipparalli Tharlegalu		Kannada	
2011	Sanju Weds Geetha		Kannada	Special appearance in song
2013	Sillunu Oru Sandhippu		Tamil	Special appearance in song
2013	Pinky - Ek Satyakatha	Ritu	Marathi	Parallel Lead

Music videos

- Gandasiyaan - Sarbjit Cheema
- Vaada Tera Vaada - Nitin Bali
- Tera Hasna Kamaal - Shael Oswal
- Jogiya - Romey Gill
- Yeh Mera Dil Pyar Ka Deewana
- Kar Le Kar Le Koi Dhamaal (Kaun Banega Crorepati Theme Song)

Television

- Tumhari Disha
- Kaisa Ye Pyar Hai
