= Pakka Chukka =

2003 Indian film directed by S. Narayan

- Directed by: S. Narayan
- Written by: Ilakkiyan; S. Narayan
- Screenplay by: Ilakkiyan; S. Narayan; Ramani
- Produced by: Pavan Narayan; Pankaj Narayan
- Starring: Ramesh Aravind; S. Narayan
- Cinematography: Mathew
- Edited by: P. R. Sounder Raj
- Music by: Songs: S. Narayan; Score: Prashanth Raj
- Production company: Shambhavi Pictures
- Release date: 31 January 2003
- Country: India
- Language: Kannada

Pakka Chukka is a 2003 Indian Kannada-language comedy film directed by S. Narayan starring Ramesh Aravind and himself. Ruchita Prasad, Mahalakshmi, Doddanna, Mukhyamantri Chandru and Sundar Raj play supporting roles.

== Plot ==
Rami and Nani disguise as their fathers (who are their lookalikes) and make a group of people believe that they are swamijis. After finding out that they have been tricked, people beat up the fathers since Rami and Nani have run away. While on the run, Rami and Nani run into a house where a newly married couple are ready to get in bed during their first night. The couple files a complaint in the police station. Since the police are after them, Rami and Nani run non-stop and jump on stage during a modeling competition and win an oil lamp.

Meanwhile, Chandru tells a group of guys that two potential grooms are coming from the US for their rich uncle, and his men hatch a plan to pretend to dress like them and kidnap them at the Bangalore International Airport. Chandru's men execute the plan with two of them dressing like the American potential grooms and two of them as the kidnappers. After the police inspector Sundar arrives, Rami and Nani run to the airport. While they are changing clothes, the clothes of the American grooms and their orange wigs fall on them. One shirt says "Pakka" and the other "Chukka". After they leave the airport, Chandru's rich uncle mistakes them to be the American grooms. They now call themselves Pakka and Chukka hoping that they will not lose their identities.

Chandru and Sundru attempt to hatch a series of plots against Rami and Nani including a failed attempt to switch Rami and Nani back with Chandru's men. Rami and Nani fall in love with the rich man's daughters — Meena and her sister, respectively. They escape from the rich man's home. Chandru and Sundru choke their rich uncle's wife and make her faint. They frame Rami and Nani for the murder but since they act mentally unstable, they are taken to the mental hospital as shown at the beginning of the film. Rami and Nani's fathers find out what their sons have been doing and come to the rich man's house. The leave their sons naked with only a towel and steal their wigs, taking advantage of the situation. Chandru and Sundru are confused when Rami and Nani start shaving but little do they know that they are not Rami and Nani but their fathers. Rami and Nani's father take advantage of the situation and Rami's father even falls for the maid. This confuses the rich man who had a good impression of the American grooms, who now start smoking in front of him. Chandru and Sundru come to their rich uncle's house in the night. They are confused because when they wake Rami and Nani, they come to urinate on them twice (the second time it was their fathers). Chandru and Sundru use Meena and her sister to do something against Rami and Nani. However, a flies comes into the room and lands on Sundru, leaving him injured. The rich man later finds out that Rami and Nani are not his potential grooms from America but he is okay with them marrying his daughters after all that has happened.

== Cast ==
- Ramesh Aravind as Rami a.k.a. Pakka and Rami's father
- S. Narayan as Nani a.k.a. Chukka and Nani's father
- Ruchitha Prasad as Meena
- Mahalakshmi as Meena's sister
- Doddanna as Meena's father and Chandru and Sundru's uncle
- Mukhyamantri Chandru as Chandru
- Sundar Raj as Sundru
- Shobaraj as Inspector Sundar Raj
- Mandeep Roy as Cook
- Chitra Shenoy as Meena's mother
- R. G. Vijayasarathy as Doctor
- Kote Prabhakar as Chandru's henchman

== Production ==
S. Narayan and Ramesh Aravind were working together again after the success of their two previous collaborations — Kurigalu Saar Kurigalu (2001) and Kothigalu Saar Kothigalu (2001). Singer Mahalakshmi was signed to play the female lead, making her debut as an actress, alongside Ruchitha Prasad. In an interview during the film's production, Narayan stated, "For the first time, Ramesh is acting under my direction. He missed acting under our banner thrice. We have now decided to make this film to suit our image. The speciality of this film is that both of us will be wearing similar costumes throughout the film and will be seen together always." Filming took place in and around Bangalore. Narayan stated he made the film with the intention to make people bored at home laugh for two hours.

== Soundtrack ==
Pakka Chukka

Soundtrack album by S. Narayan Background Score: Prashanth Raj
- Released: 2003
- Genre: Feature film soundtrack
- Length: 19:28
- Language: Kannada
- Label: Akash Audio

S. Narayan chronology
Pakka Chukka (2003)	Veeru (2006)

Prashanth Raj chronology
Aathma (2002)	Pakka Chukka (2003)	Hucchana Maduveli Undone Jana (2003)

The songs for the film were composed by S. Narayan while the background score was composed by Prashanth Raj. The soundtrack was released under the music label Akash Audio.

Track listing
No.	Title	Singer(s)	Length
1.	"Ghal Ghal Ghal"	Rajesh Krishnan, K. S. Chithra	4:42
2.	"Gumma Gumma"	S. Narayan, L. N. Shastri	4:24
3.	"Masala Masala"	Manjula Gururaj	5:12
4.	"Odu Odu Odu"	Devan Ekambaram	4:30
5.	"Yavva Yavva Enaithu"	Rajesh Krishnan, K. S. Chithra	4:40
Total length:			23:28

== Release and reception ==
The film was released on 30 January 2003.

A critic from Viggy wrote that "Overall, is an overdosed comedy film without sync". A critic from indiainfo wrote that "People have forgotten to laugh. Though they know that laughing is very necessary for good health. Actually there is no one to make them laugh". Deccan Herald wrote "Ramesh and Narayan have no scope to perform. It is quite surprising how Ramesh accepted such an inane subject. There are some funny situations in the film and that’s about it. Doddanna is wasted and so are the glamour dolls. Mandeep Rai and Shobhraj give some comic relief. It is refreshing to see villain Shobhraj in a comic role. Mukhyamantri Chandru is okay.A film that has an overdose of comedy but is not in place".
