= Shabdavedhi =

- DVD Cover
- Directed by: S. Narayan
- Written by: Vijay Sasanur
- Produced by: Parvathamma Rajkumar
- Starring: Rajkumar; Jayapradha; K. S. Ashwath; Sowcar Janaki; Umashree
- Cinematography: R. Giri
- Edited by: S. Manohar
- Music by: Hamsalekha
- Production company: Sri Bhargavi Arts Combines
- Release date: 10 February 2000
- Running time: 165 minutes
- Country: India
- Language: Kannada

Shabdavedhi is a 2000 Kannada-language action drama film directed by S. Narayan and produced by Sri Bhargavi Arts Combines. The film, based on a novel of same name by Vijay Sasanur, stars Dr. Rajkumar, Jayapradha, K. S. Ashwath, Sowcar Janaki and Umashree. The music was composed by Hamsalekha, while the cinematography and editing were handled by R. Giri and S. Manohar. The film marked the last acting venture of Dr. Rajkumar.

Shabdavedhi was released on 10 February 2000 to mixed reviews from critics and became a commercial success at the box office.

== Premise ==
Inspector Sandeep sets on a crusade against drug trafficking by creating an army of teenagers after the police department refused to help him in his crusade.

== Cast ==
- Dr. Rajkumar as Inspector Sandeep
- Jaya Prada as Vathsala, Sandeep's wife (voice dubbed by B. Jayashree)
- K. S. Ashwath in Dual Roles G. K. Kamalakar, Karnataka DGP and G. K. Prasad, Drug Mafia Kingpin
- Sowcar Janaki as Sandeep's mother
- Master Santosh as Sathish, Sandeep and Vathsala's son
- Mukhyamantri Chandru as Raghava, a journalist
- M. S. Umesh as Constable
- Umashree as Malathi, Constable's wife
- Bhavanishankar as Narcotics Dealer Thammayya Shetty
- Shobhraj as De Cruz
- Chi. Guru Dutt as Badrinath
- Honnavalli Krishna as Constable Krishna
- Daali as Subbu
- Karibasavaiah
- R. G. Vijayasarathy as a lawyer
- Renukamma Murugodu
- Rajeev as Asst. Commissioner of Police
- Huilvan Gangadharayya as Asst. Commissioner of Police
- Shankar Bhat as Thammayya Shetty's Advocate
- Shailaja Joshi as Mother of Abducted Child
- Venkatesh Prasad

== Production ==
This film has its credit as the comeback film of Rajkumar after almost six years. This was the first time that S. Narayan, age of 35 directed a film starring the legendary actor. The film was shot locations such as K R Circle in Bangalore, Abhiman Studio on the city's outskirts, Rama Mandira in Rajajinagar, Kashmir. The song "Prema Kashmira" was shot at Kashmir. Mysore's police commissioner Kempaiah has given guidance for star's uniforms in the movie.

The producer of the film had originally planned to have Bhanupriya as the female lead, but she was living abroad having married then. Jayaprada was then chosen as the female lead actor.

== Soundtrack ==
Shabdavedhi

Soundtrack album by Hamsalekha
- Released: 1999
- Genre: Feature film soundtrack
- Length: 31:48
- Label: Magnasound
- Producer: Hamsalekha

Hamsalekha chronology
| Naga Devathe (2000) | Shabdavedhi (1999) | Hagalu Vesha (2000) |

Hamsalekha composed the film's background score and the soundtrack, also writing lyrics for it. The soundtrack album consists of six tracks.

Track list
| No. | Title | Lyrics | Singer(s) | Length |
|---|---|---|---|---|
| 1. | "Prema Kashmira" | Hamsalekha | Dr. Rajkumar, Chithra | 5:20 |
| 2. | "Oh Gelathi" | Hamsalekha | Dr. Rajkumar, Chithra | 5:16 |
| 3. | "Thayare Thayare" | Hamsalekha | Dr. Rajkumar, Chithra | 5:10 |
| 4. | "Namma Yejamamrau" | Hamsalekha | Dr. Rajkumar, Manjula Gururaj | 5:33 |
| 5. | "Baaro Baaro Sri Krishna Baro" | Hamsalekha | S. P. Balasubrahmanyam | 5:12 |
| 6. | "Janarindha" | Hamsalekha | Dr. Rajkumar | 5:17 |
| Total length: | | | | 31:48 |

== Reception ==
Shabdavedhi received positive reviews from critics.

=== Critical response ===
Rediff wrote "The storyline and its handling added to the feeling of deja vu, as it lacked both the slickness and pace that Kannada movies today have. Perhaps director S Narayan and producer Parvathamma deliberately decided to keep to Rajakumar’s old style of films, without realising that audience tastes have changed now." India Info wrote "There are few loopholes from the director and in the story by senior police officer Vijaya Sasanur that could have been avoided. However, this film is a feat to the innumerable fans of Dr. Rajkumar."

=== Box office ===
Shabdavedhi completed 25 week-run in Kapali Theatre and 100 days in various centres across Karnataka. The film was considered as "movies with good quality" by the Government of Karnataka and was given a subsidy of ₹10 lakhs.

== Awards ==
- Special Award for Social Commitment

== Controversy ==
In the first day of release, a technical snag in the audio system at Kapali Theatre reportedly led audience and Rajkumar's fans to ransack the place causing the owners a loss worth ₹20 lakhs.
