= Guru En Aalu =

2009 film directed by Selva

- Poster
- Directed by: Selvaa
- Written by: L. Venkatesan; Neenu (dialogues)
- Story by: Aziz Mirza
- Based on: Yes Boss (Hindi)
- Produced by: K. R. Gangadharan
- Starring: Madhavan; Abbas; Mamta Mohandas; Vivek; Brinda Parekh
- Cinematography: U. K. Senthil Kumar
- Edited by: V. T. Vijayan
- Music by: Srikanth Deva
- Distributed by: KRG Movies International
- Release date: 24 April 2009
- Country: India
- Language: Tamil

Guru En Aalu (transl. Guru is My Man) is a 2009 Indian Tamil-language romantic comedy film directed by Selvaa and produced by K. R. Gangadharan. The film stars Madhavan, Abbas and Mamta Mohandas in the lead roles, while Vivek and Brinda Parekh portray supporting roles. It is a remake of the 1997 Hindi film Yes Boss. The music was composed by Srikanth Deva with cinematography by U. K. Senthil Kumar and editing by V. T. Vijayan. The film began production in 2008 and released on 24 April 2009.

== Plot ==
Guru is the ambitious assistant of his playboy boss Krishna, who is the CEO of a big chain of companies. Krishna is a charismatic and successful businessman who in spite of being married to Sheila, a beautiful woman, has affairs with numerous women and relies on Guru to keep up his image of a doting husband. Guru is promised by Krishna to make him as the head of one of his companies. Guru is loggerheads with Seema, a beautiful woman he encounters during a road traffic. The duo later become friends. Guru goes along in the hope of being promoted. His goal is to become a rich man against all odds. Azhagappan is a fraudulent Yoga master, who earns money in the name of Yoga. Guru tries to maintain Krishna's image during Krishna and Seema's anniversary while Krishna is busy with his one night stand with another woman. After seeing the model Seema at a fashion show, Krishna instantly is smitten by her and requests Guru to arrange opportunities to meet with her leaving Guru fuming for he had also fallen in love with Seema. Seema later receives an award as the best ramp model from Krishna. Krishna asks Guru to sign Seema as the model for 'lux soaps'. Seema, during the shoot, is attracted to Krishna after witnessing Krishna's gentleman behavior. She later confesses to Guru that she is in love with Krishna and is soon going to propose to him which upsets Guru. Krishna is more than happy after she proposes to him. On an attempt to bring Krishna's nature with women, he wontedly makes Sheila to go to the mall, Krishna and Seema are on a date. Terrified on looking at Sheila, he covers his identity and introduces Sheila to Seema as his wife much to Seema's horror. When Sheila gets suspicious, he blabbers that Seema is Guru's fiancé which makes Seema leave angrily. Realizing he doesn't love his wife anymore, he orders Guru to make Seema meet him which Guru reluctantly agrees. Seema is not convinced to meet Krishna. The duo bond and she agrees to meet Krishna once for Guru.

Seema is not convinced by Krishna's forgiveness. Krishna manipulates her and lies to her telling that his wife was cheating on him. A man, on Krishna's order, comes and hugs Sheila from the back and she responds by smiling thinking as Krishna. But this not understood by Seema, forgives him. Seema becomes Krishna's mistress. Guru tries to sabotage every moment Krishna wishes to meet Seema. Later, Krishna comes jealous of Guru's closeness to Seema and plans for an ad shoot abroad so as to secretly date Seema. Knowing this, Guru wantedly talks about his boss's affairs with women with Azhagappan so as Sheila's uncle, Gopal overhears it. Gopal is an unmarried middle aged man who is in search of his dream woman. Seema is convinced by Krishna that he is going to divorce Sheila and marry her. Guru makes Azhagappan dress up as an aunty, Lassi Latha, to prevent Seema go on a dinner date with Krishna. Krishna tries hard to make Guru move away. Gopal, much to azhagappan's horror, falls in love with Lassi Latha, his disguise. Krishna is terrified once Sheila also reaches the shoot location. Krishna decides to sleep with Seema and spikes her drink, which by mistake Sheila drinks it after she eats a spiked food given to her by Guru. Seema gets closer to Guru. They return to Chennai. Krishna realises that Guru loves Seema and tries to take revenge on him. Gopal is shocked and faints when he finds that Lassi Latha is Azhagappan, who is his sister Suguna's lover. Seema gets closer to Guru's family. She feels angry after Krishna insults Guru's family. She realizes that Guru loves her too and gets confused. Krishna makes Guru the boss of a company when Seema persuades Krishna and tells guru that he and Seema are going to a date to Kerala. This makes Guru understand that his love for Seema is greater than his company. Seema realists she loves Guru but felt attracted to Krishna only because of his money and her desire to become rich. She understands Krishna's nature when he overhears his conversation. Guru comes to Kerala and saves Seema and she confesses her love for him. Krishna fires Guru from his company.

Krishna leaves Seema asking if she has any sister for him to marry. Seema and Guru live happily and understands that love is powerful than money.

== Cast ==
- Madhavan as Guru
- Abbas as Krishna
- Mamta Mohandas as Seema
- Vivek as Aasana Azhagappan/"Lassi" Latha
- Brinda Parekh as Sheila, Krishna's wife
- M. S. Baskar as Gopal, Sheila's Uncle
- Sona Heiden as Suguna, Gopal's sister
- Mayilsamy as Director
- Pattimandram Raja as Guru's father
- Renuka as Guru's mother
- Poovilangu Mohan as Seema's father
- Meera Krishnan as Seema's mother
- Aarthi as Guru's sister
- Thambi Ramaiah as Krishna's lawyer
- Manobala as hostel Security.
- Mohan Raman as Sheila's father
- Sharmilee as Sowbhagya, Suguna's aunt
- Cell Murugan as Rowdy
- Balaji
- Bayilvan Ranganathan as Aasana Azhagappan's student
- Krishnamoorthy

== Production ==
When Selva decided to remake the 1997 Hindi film Yes Boss in Tamil and informed that film's star Shah Rukh Khan on the same, Khan recommended Madhavan as the lead actor. Jayaram was initially to portray the role that Aditya Pancholi portrayed in Yess Boss, but left and was replaced with Abbas, who appeared with Madhavan in Minnale (2001). Vivek, who also appeared in that film, would reunite with both Madhavan and Abbas. Filming began at Chennai in May 2008 and continued in various locations in Kerala. The introductory song for Madhavan was shot at AVM Studios Studios in Vadapalani, Chennai with several extras, choreographed by Babu. Sona Heiden was selected to appear. The technical crew includes cinematographer U. K. Senthil Kumar, editor V. T. Vijayan and dialogue writer L. Venkatesan.

== Release and reception ==
The film was released on 24 April 2009. Sify claimed that it is "nowhere near the original which was technically superior with super hit songs and locales". Rediff.com wrote, "If you're looking for a re-creation of a feel-good candy-floss romance, then Selva's shoddy screenplay that's come more than a decade too late is likely to prove quite a drag". The Hindu called it "typical commercial cocktail" and concluded that "If you have watched the original you are bound to be perplexed by unnecessary additions in the Tamil version that drag the film down to deplorable levels".

== Soundtrack ==
The soundtrack was composed by Srikanth Deva. The audio launch was held in Chennai on 27 September 2008. "Spun" by Flipsyde is used in the song "Chellame Chellame", and "Bouger Bouger" by Magic System was used as "Veesuvadhu".

| No. | Title | Lyrics | Performer(s) | Length |
|---|---|---|---|---|
| 1. | "Vaanam Vanthu" | Pa. Vijay | Krish | 4:31 |
| 2. | "Chellame Chellamae" | Pa. Vijay | Udit Narayan | 4:42 |
| 3. | "Veesuvadhu" | Palani Bharathi | Benny Dayal | 4:14 |
| 4. | "Kadhal Kannadiyil" | Kabilan | Prasanna Rao and Sadhana Sargam | 3:59 |
| 5. | "Alaipayudhey" | Pa. Vijay | Karthik, Ranjith, Swetha Mohan and Niruthya | 4:37 |
| 6. | "Kadhal Kolagalam" | Kabilan | Rakeep | 3:18 |
| Total length: | | | | 25:21 |

== In other media ==
Six years after the release of the film, Vivek and M. S. Bhaskar reprised their roles of Latha and Gopal respectively, in the 2015 film Vai Raja Vai during a dream sequence at Goa.
