= Thipparalli Tharlegalu =

- Directed by: Rajendra Singh Babu
- Written by: S. Narayan
- Produced by: Rajendra Singh Babu; A Mohan
- Starring: Ambareesh; Komal; S. Narayan; Om Prakash Rao; Brinda Parekh
- Cinematography: B L Babu
- Edited by: B S Kemparaj
- Music by: M N Krupakar
- Release date: 2 April 2010
- Country: India
- Language: Kannada

Thipparalli Tharlegalu is a 2010 Indian Kannada-language film directed by Rajendra Singh Babu starring Ambareesh, Komal, S. Narayan, Om Prakash Rao and Brinda Parekh in lead roles. The film was released on 2 April 2010 alongside Premism and Satya.

== Cast ==
- Ambareesh as Kanwarlal
- Komal as Pandu
- S. Narayan as Nani
- Om Prakash Rao as Pandu
- Brinda Parekh
- Sadhu Kokila
- Bullet Prakash
- Suresh Chandra as Minister Hanumanthappa
- Girija Lokesh
- Pooja Kanwal
- Doddanna as Halkatti
- Sundar Raj
- Umashree
- Giribale Rekha
- Joe Simon
- Siddaraj Kalyankar
- Nataraj
- Vaswani
- Master Arun
- Dharma
- Tanya (special appearance in "Kannalle Kannalle")

== Production ==
Ambareesh reprises his role of Kanwarlal from Antha (1981) in this film. According to the director, Ambareesh makes a cameo in the film.

== Soundtrack ==
Thipparalli Tharlegalu

Soundtrack album by M N Krupakar
- Released: 2010
- Recorded: 2010
- Genre: Feature film soundtrack
- Length: 16:33
- Language: Kannada

Official audio
- Thipparalli Tharlegalu - Full Album on YouTube

Track listing
No.	Title	Singer(s)	Length
1.	"Naanu Kolike Ranga"	Hemanth Kumar, Sudheendra, Shankar, Raj Guru	3:47
2.	"Cham Cham Sweety"	Hemanth Kumar, Priyadarshini	3:30
3.	"Kunigal Kudure"	Anoop Chandran, Apoorva	2:53
4.	"Kappu Kappu"	Gurukiran, Chaitra H. G.	3:44
5.	"Kannalle Kannalle"	S. P. Balasubrahmanyam, Sneha	3:19
Total length:			16:33

== Reception ==
=== Critical response ===
Shruti Indira Lakshminarayana from Rediff.com scored the film at 1 out of 5 stars and says "The film raises questions such as, "Is politics just about publicity and money? Is it only bullets that do the talking in the field? The film in short speaks of the death of democracy that we are witnessing. If only the theme was backed by punchy dialogues and dry humour! Babu, who has given films Kurigalu Sir Kurigalu, disappoints this time. Thipparalli Tharlegalu is a letdown". A critic from The New Indian Express wrote "It is a pity to see a director like Rajendra Babu offering a stale flick that has nothing to offer the audience except for long and boring speeches. The much-publicised Kanwarlal character also fails to offer a relief to the audience". A critic from Bangalore Mirror wrote "A higher level of comedy and satire is required for a film like this. Make sure the AC is working and seats are very comfortable in the cinema hall. A couple of hours rest is good on a hot summer day".
