= Megha Maale =

- VCD cover
- Directed by: S. Narayan
- Written by: S. Narayan
- Starring: Sunad Raj; Vijayashree
- Cinematography: P. K. H. Das
- Edited by: T. Shashikumar
- Music by: Hamsalekha
- Production company: Swathi Movies
- Release date: 10 June 1994
- Country: India
- Language: Kannada

Megha Maale (transl. Garland of clouds) is a 1994 Indian Kannada-language romantic family drama film directed by S. Narayan. The film stars newcomer Sunad Raj and Vijayashree. The film was a box office success.

== Cast ==
- Sunad Raj as Raghu
- Vijayashree as Roopa
- M. P. Shankar
- S. Narayan
- Jayanthi
- Bhavyashree Rai
- Vijayendra
- M. S. Umesh
- Shobaraj
- Master Madhan

== Production ==
Raghavendra made his debut with this film and was credited as Sunad Raj to avoid being confused with Raghavendra Rajkumar. Dr. Rajkumar closed the clapperboard for the muhurat shot.

== Soundtrack ==
The music was composed by Hamsalekha. Dr. Rajkumar sang the title song, and the music was well received.

Megha Maale

Soundtrack album by Hamsalekha
- Released: 1994
- Genre: Feature film soundtrack
- Length: 34:34
- Language: Kannada
- Label: Lahari Music

Hamsalekha chronology
Mahakshathriya (1994)	Megha Maale (1994)	Halunda Tavaru (1994)
External audio
- Megha Maale – Jukebox on YouTube

All lyrics are written by Hamsalekha.

Track listing
No.	Title	Singer(s)	Length
1.	"Bhoodevigindu"	S. P. Balasubrahmanyam, Latha Hamsalekha	4:43
2.	"Om Pratham Om"	S. P. Balasubrahmanyam, K. S. Chithra	5:01
3.	"Ghamaka"	S. P. Balasubrahmanyam, S. Janaki	4:41
4.	"Ondu Hudugi Nodde Kano"	S. P. Balasubrahmanyam	4:47
5.	"Megha Maale"	Dr. Rajkumar	5:05
6.	"Ivalu Hetthavalu"	S. P. Balasubrahmanyam	5:12
7.	"Megha Maale (Female version)"	K. S. Chithra	5:05
Total length:			34:34

== Reception ==
In 2023, a writer from Hindustan Times wrote that "The film Megha Maale won the hearts of moviegoers with its screenplay and songs and will never be forgotten. Though the hero and heroine of this film are newcomers, the onscreen chemistry was well worked out".
