= Simhadriya Simha =

- Film poster
- Directed by: S. Narayan
- Screenplay by: S. Narayan
- Story by: Erode Sounder
- Based on: Nattamai (Tamil)
- Produced by: Smt. Prabhavathi Vijaykumar
- Starring: Vishnuvardhan; Meena; Bhanupriya; Abhijeeth; Umashri; Mukhyamantri Chandru; Ruchita Prasad; Shobaraj
- Cinematography: Ramesh Babu
- Edited by: P. R. Soundarraj
- Music by: Deva
- Release date: 7 June 2002
- Country: India
- Language: Kannada

Simhadriya Simha (transl. The Lion of Simhadri) is a 2002 Indian Kannada-language action drama film directed by S. Narayan. The film is a remake of the 1994 Tamil film Nattamai and stars Vishnuvardhan, Meena and Bhanupriya in the lead roles. Vishnuvardhan played a triple role as two brothers in the lead and their father in a special appearance in this movie. Meena and Bhanupriya reprised their roles from the original and 1995 Telugu film Pedarayudu respectively. The music of the film was composed by Deva.

== Plot ==
The story revolves around Narasimhe Gowda (Vishnuvardhan), who is the chieftain for a group of 48 villages. He is the man with the strength of an elephant and who rules the Simhadri village as a lion rules his kingdom. The sincerity and the wisdom in the judgment make the people go to Narasimha for justice and not the police. one of the relative of Narasimha Gowda Shobraj's, rapes a girl and is banished from the village for 18 years. He also has to marry the girl according to the judgment by the Gowda. Such a harsh judgment makes Shobraj's father kill Narasimhe Gowda. The throne is ascended by the elder son of Narasimha Gowda, who is also portrayed by Vishnuvardhan as a just and powerful ruler. Things take a turn after 18 years when the Simhadriya Simha family has to undergo a similar situation. Due to a twist of fate, Gowda has to decide his brother Chikka's (again played by Vishnuvardhan) fate. The judgment - Chikka is ordered to leave the village for 10 years. Truth is unveiled when Shobraj's mother reveals the involvement of her son in falsely implicating Chikka. Gowda then realizes his mistake and falls unconscious. However, the doctors revive him and the newborn baby acknowledges him as doddappa.

== Cast ==
- Vishnuvardhan in a triple role as
  - Jr. Gowda
  - Chikkanna
  - Narasimha Gowda (special appearance)
- Meena as Deepa, Chikkanna's wife (voice dubbed by Sudharani)
- Bhanupriya as Lakshmi, Jr. Gowda's wife
- Shivaram
- M. S. Umesh
- Shobhraj
- Abhijeeth
- Umashri
- Mukhyamantri Chandru
- Sundar Raj
- Keerthiraj
- Ruchita Prasad
- Rekha Das
- Vijay Kumar as Lakshmi's Brother
- Sirija

== Production ==
The film finished production work in April 2002.

== Soundtrack ==
The film's soundtrack was composed by Deva with lyrics penned by the director S. Narayan himself. The song "Kotha Paakum" from the original Tamil film Nattamai was retained here as "Malnad Adike". The song "Priya Priya" was from the Tamil film Kattabomman. Deva later reused "Kalladare Naanu" as "Poove Mudhal" in Tamil film Kadhal Kirukkan. The song Yajamaana Yajamaana is a heavily revised tune of Deva's own Tamil song Un Uthattora from Panchalankurichi.

Track#	Song	Singer(s)
1	"Barthanavva"	S.P. Balasubrahmanyam, K. S. Chitra, Rajesh Krishnan, Sangeeta Gururaj
2	"Kallaadare Naanu"	S.P. Balasubrahmanyam
3	"Malnad Adike"	Rajesh Krishnan, S. P. Balasubrahmanyam, Sangeeta Gururaj
4	"Priya Priya"	S. P. Balasubrahmanyam, Chandrika Gururaj
5	"Simhadriya"	S. P. Balasubrahmanyam
6	"Yajamaana"	S. P. Balasubrahmanyam, K. S. Chithra

== Reception ==
The film received positive reviews. Vishnuvardhan's acting was said to be the highlight of the film.

The film became a hit in Karnataka and completed 25 successful weeks in the theaters. It created a craze among the audience and songs like Malnad Adike, Priya Priya and Simhaadriya Simha, all sung by S. P. Balasubrahmanyam were huge hits and were regularly played at functions, shows etc.
