= Bianca Desai =

Indian actress

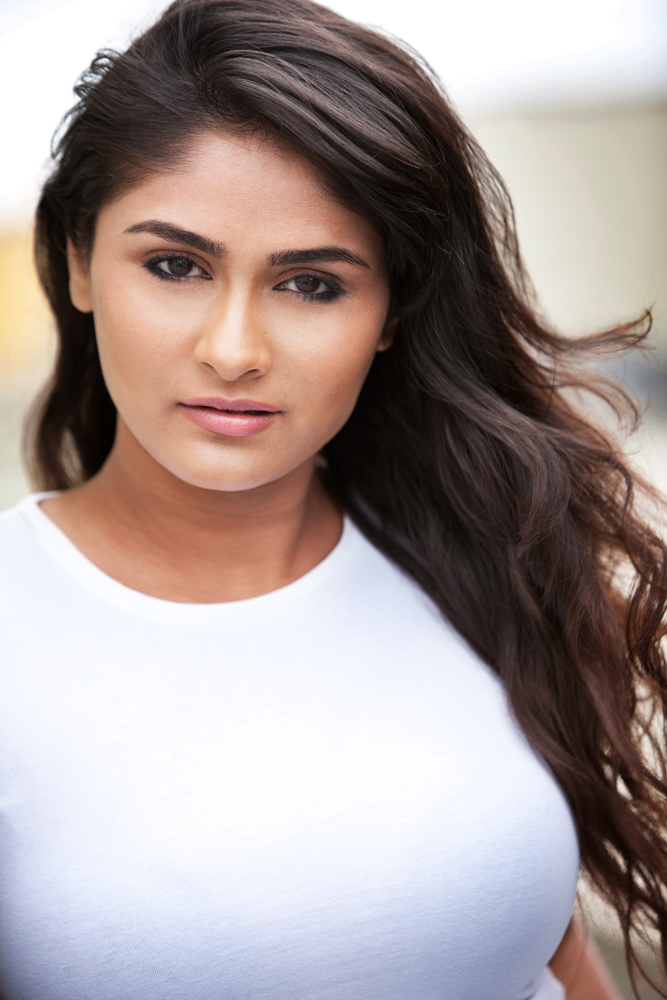
- Born: India
- Occupation: Film actress
- Years active: 2007-present

Bianca Desai or Biyanka Desai is an Indian actress who has starred in predominantly Kannada and Telugu films.

== Career ==
Bianca Desai has been part of more than 9 films in Kannada.

== Filmography ==
Year	Film	Role	Language	Notes
2006	Sainikudu	Special appearance	Telugu	
2007	Sivaji: The Boss	Pia	Tamil	Uncredited
2007	Yamagola Malli Modalayindi	Menaka	Telugu	Uncredited
2008	Jalsa	Bhagyamathi's friend	Telugu	
2008	Nesthama	Sandhya	Telugu	
2008	Rocky	Usha	Kannada	
2009	Gulama	Priyanka	Kannada	
2009	Chellidaru Sampigeya	Soumya	Kannada	
2009	Yogi	Mala	Kannada	
2010	Chalaki	Gnana Prasunambha	Telugu	
2010	Sanchari	Bindu	Kannada	
2010	Kiccha Huccha		Kannada	Special appearance
2010	Huduga Hudugi		Kannada	Special appearance
2011	Koffi Bar	Srijana	Telugu	
2011	Noorondu Bagilu	Vardha	Kannada	
2011	Swayam Krushi	Priya	Kannada	
2012	This Weekend	Shivani	Hindi	
2013	Nimidangal	Srijana	Tamil	
2016	Neron	Shilpa	English	

== See also ==
- List of people from Karnataka
- Cinema of Karnataka
- List of Indian actresses
- Cinema of India
