= S. Narayan =

Film director and actor

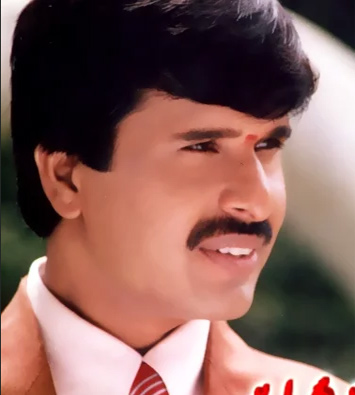
- S. Narayan in 2000 film Nannavalu Nannavalu
- Born: 5 June 1962 (age 64)
- Occupations: Film director, actor, producer, screenwriter, composer, lyricist,
- Years active: 1992–present
- Spouse: Bhagyavati Narayan
- Children: 3, including Pankaj Narayan

S. Narayan (born 5 June 1962) is an Indian filmmaker, actor and lyricist of Kannada films. After Singeetam Srinivasa Rao, Narayan is the second director to direct Dr. Rajkumar and all his three sons. He has given many hits with Vishnuvardhan, some of which were remake films.

== Career ==
After assisting H. R. Bharghava, Raj Kishore and A. T. Raghu, Narayan made his directorial debut with the romantic drama Chaitrada Premanjali (1992), with newcomers. The film, which featured a successful soundtrack by Hamsalekha became a musical hit at the box office. He then went on to direct similar themed romantic films such as Anuragada Alegalu (1992), Megha Maale (1994), and also successful family dramas like Thavarina Thottilu and Bevu Bella. Throughout the 2000s, he directed mostly remakes, such as Surya Vamsha, Simhadriya Simha, and Cheluvina Chittara. In 2015, he directed Daksha, starring Duniya Vijay, which was completely shot in single takes. In 2016, he was supposed to direct a project called JD, starring Jagadish Gowda and Dictator with Huccha Venkat; both got shelved after launch. He directed Na Panta Kano and Manasu Mallige, a remake of the Marathi film Sairat.

== Filmography ==
Year	Title	Credited as			Notes	Ref.
Year	Title	Director	Producer	Writer	Notes	Ref.
1992	Chaitrada Premanjali	Yes		Yes		
1992	Nanjunda	Yes		Screenplay		
1993	Anuragada Alegalu	Yes		Yes		
1993	Bevu Bella	Yes		Yes		
1993	Captain	Yes		Yes		
1994	Megha Maale	Yes		Yes		
1994	Kaveri Teeradalli	Yes		Yes		
1995	Nighaata	Yes	Yes	Yes		
1996	Thavarina Thottilu	Yes		Screenplay		
1996	Vasanta Kavya	Yes		Screenplay		
1996	Gulabi	Yes		Screenplay		
1997	Taayi Kotta Seere	Yes		Screenplay		
1997	Kalyani	Yes		Yes		
1997	Mahabharata	Yes		Screenplay		
1998	Bhama Satyabhama	Yes		Yes		
1999	Veerappa Nayaka	Yes	Yes	Yes		
1999	Ravimama	Yes		Screenplay		
1999	Surya Vamsha	Yes		Screenplay		
2000	Shabdavedhi	Yes		Screenplay		
2000	Galate Aliyandru	Yes		Screenplay		
2000	Nannavalu Nannavalu	Yes	Yes	Yes		
2001	Anjali Geetanjali	Yes		Yes		
2001	Baanallu Neene Bhuviyallu Neene	Yes		Screenplay		
2002	Jamindarru	Yes		Yes		
2002	Simhadriya Simha	Yes		Screenplay		
2003	Pakka Chukka	Yes		Yes		
2003	Chandra Chakori	Yes		Yes	Won – Karnataka State Film Award for Best Film	
2004	Jai	Yes			Tamil film	
2004	Maurya	Yes		Screenplay		
2005	Varsha	Yes		Screenplay		
2006	Veeru	Yes	Yes	Yes		
2006	Sevanthi Sevanthi	Yes		Yes		
2006	Sirivantha	Yes		Screenplay		
2007	Thayiya Madilu	Yes	Yes	Yes		
2007	Cheluvina Chittara	Yes	Yes	Screenplay		
2007	Chanda	Yes	Yes	Yes		
2008	Chaitrada Chandrama	Yes	Yes	Yes		
2009	Chickpete Sachagalu		Yes	Yes		
2009	Chellidaru Sampigeya	Yes	Yes	Screenplay		
2009	Cheluvina Chilipili	Yes	Yes	Yes		
2010	Thipparalli Tharlegalu		Yes	Yes		
2010	Veera Parampare	Yes	Yes	Screenplay		
2011	Dushtaa	Yes	Yes	Yes		
2011	Shyloo	Yes		Screenplay		
2012	Munjane	Yes	Yes	Yes		
2013	Chathrigalu Saar Chathrigalu	Yes		Screenplay		
2013	Appayya	Yes	Yes	Yes		
2015	Daksha	Yes	Yes	Yes		
2017	Manasu Mallige	Yes		Yes	One song only	
2017	Naa Panta Kano	Yes		Yes		
2024	5D	Yes		Yes		
2025	Marutha	Yes		Yes		

=== As actor ===
Year	Title	Role	Notes
1992	Chaitrada Premanjali	Shankar	
1993	Bevu Bella		
1995	Oho	Krishnamurthy	
1995	Nighaata		
1996	Gulabi		
1997	Taayi Kotta Seere		
1997	Kalyani		
1999	Tarikere Erimele		
1999	Suryavamsha	Athmananda	Special appearance
2000	Galate Aliyandru	Nandakumar	
2000	Nannavalu Nannavalu		
2001	Kurigalu Saar Kurigalu	Nani	
2001	Anjali Geetanjali	Sagar	
2001	Halu Sakkare		
2001	Mr Harishchandra		
2001	Vishalakshammana Ganda	Vijay Prakash	
2001	Baanallu Neene Bhuviyallu Neene	Gopalakrishna	
2001	Kothigalu Saar Kothigalu	Nani	
2002	Balagalittu Olage Baa	Madan Mohan Desai	
2003	Pakka Chukka	Nani a.k.a. Chukka and Nani's father	Dual roles
2003	Katthegalu Saar Katthegalu	Nani	
2006	Honeymoon Express	Nani	
2009	Chickpete Sachagalu	Nani	
2010	Thipparalli Tharlegalu	Nani	
2013	Chathrigalu Saar Chathrigalu	Narayan aka Nani	
2016	Kiragoorina Gayyaligalu	Dr. Annappa	
2022	Old Monk	Narayan	
2022	Sugarless	Doctor	
2023	Abhiramachandra	Doctor	
2024	5D	Abhinandan	

=== As lyricist ===
Year	Title	Notes
1994	Kunthi Puthra	
2001	Jenu Goodu	
2002	Annayya Thammayya	
2010	Thipparalli Tharlegalu	
2011	Devadas	
2013	Mugila Chumbana	
2024	5D	
2025	Marutha	

=== Television ===
- Parvathi
- Ambika
- Durga

== Discography ==
=== As composer ===
Year	Title	Notes	Ref.
2003	Pakka Chukka	Songs only	
2006	Veeru		
2007	Chanda		
2008	Chaitrada Chandrama		
2009	Chickpete Sachagalu		
2009	Chellidaru Sampigeya		
2010	Thipparalli Tharlegalu		
2010	Veera Parampare	Songs only	
2011	Dushtaa		
2015	Daksha		
2017	Manasu Mallige	One song only	
2017	Naa Panta Kano		
2024	5D		
2025	Marutha		
