= Appayya (film) =

- Poster
- Directed by: S. Narayan
- Produced by: Bhagyavathi Narayan; S. Narayan
- Starring: Srinagar Kitty; Bhama
- Cinematography: Jagadish Wali
- Music by: Dharma Vish
- Production company: Bhagyavathi Combines
- Release date: 13 September 2013
- Country: India
- Language: Kannada

Appayya is a 2013 Indian Kannada-language romance film written, directed and co-produced by S. Narayan. Srinagar Kitty and Bhama star. After much delay in finding the release date, the film finally made its premier across Karnataka on 13 September 2013.

It was remade in Bengali in 2016 as Angaar starring Om and Jolly.

== Plot ==
The story centers around two rival families, headed by Goravayya and Devarajanna respectively. Appayya, has been brought up by Goravayya. Naturally, Appayya is very loyal to him. However, he falls in love with Gowra, the daughter of Devarajanna. As the affair becomes public, the rivalry between the two families intensifies. In the end, a dramatic turn of events unites the couple.

== Cast ==
- Srinagar Kitty as Appayya
- Bhama as Gowra
- Indrakumar
- Suresh Chandra
- Asha Rani
- S. Narayan

== Soundtrack ==
Appayya

Soundtrack album by S. Narayan
- Released: 14 December 2012
- Genre: Feature film soundtrack
- Length
- Label: Anand Audio

No.	Title	Lyrics	Singer(s)	Length
1.	"Bombayalli Galli Galli"	S. Narayan	Inchara. R, Chaitra H. G.
2.	"Jeeva Neenu Nannolave"	Kaviraj	Karthik
3.	"Thumbiko"	Kaviraj	Shamita Malnad
4.	"Saavira Hoogalu"	Kaviraj	Tippu, Shamita Malnad
5.	"Ondu Maathu"	S. Narayan	Naresh Iyer
6.	"Chiraruni Naa"	S. Narayan	S. P. Balasubrahmanyam, Hemanth Kumar

== Release ==
=== Critical reception ===
A critic from The Times of India wrote that "There is nothing in this film that Sandalwood viewers haven’t seen before".
