= Power (2014 Telugu film) =

- Theatrical poster
- Directed by: Bobby Kolli
- Screenplay by: Bobby Kolli; K. Chakravarthy Reddy; Mohana Krishna
- Dialogues by: Bobby Kolli; Kona Venkat
- Story by: Bobby Kolli
- Produced by: Rockline Venkatesh
- Starring: Ravi Teja; Hansika; Regina Cassandra
- Cinematography: Jayanan Vincent
- Edited by: Gautham Raju
- Music by: S. Thaman
- Production company: Rockline Entertainments
- Release date: 12 September 2014
- Running time: 143 minutes
- Country: India
- Language: Telugu
- Box office: ₹26 crore distributors' share

Power is a 2014 Indian Telugu-language action comedy film directed by debutante Bobby Kolli (credited as K. S. Ravindra) and produced by Rockline Venkatesh under the banner Rockline Entertainments, both marking their debut in Telugu cinema. The film stars Ravi Teja, Hansika Motwani and Regina Cassandra. S. Thaman composed the music.

The film revolves around two similar looking people, Baldev Sahay - a corrupt ACP in Kolkata and Tirupathi - a person aspiring to become a police officer in Hyderabad. The home minister of Bengal recruits Tirupathi to play Baldev to catch a gangster rescued by Baldev. Rest of the story is all about why Baldev became corrupt and how Tirupathi executed the unfinished mission of Baldev.

Production began on 11 December 2013. The film's talkie part was shot in Hyderabad, Bangalore, Kolkata, Chennai and Bangkok while two songs were shot in Bulgaria marking it the first Telugu film to be shot there. The film emerged as a success at the box-office. Principal photography ended on 14 August 2014. The film was released on 12 September 2014. This film was remade into Bengali with the same title in 2016.

== Plot ==
Baldev Sahay, a corrupt yet valiant ACP in Kolkata, attempts to save a dreaded gangster named Ganguly Bhai, but he loses his life, and Ganguly is kidnapped by Baldev's allies Kundan and Rajeev. Home Minister Jayavardhan is concerned about Ganguly being apprehended. Upon hearing the news of Baldev's death, his mother loses consciousness and is admitted to the hospital. Jayavardhan promises the people that he will apprehend Ganguly and offer his resignation if he is not successful.

In Hyderabad, Tirupathi, a doppelganger of Baldev Sahay, is a happy-go-lucky guy whose sole aim in life is to become a cop, but he does not achieve success. He lives with his brother-in-law Animutyam, who is a CI. To change his fortunes, Tirupathi approaches Nirupama, who claims to be a trader in astrological gemstones, which can change a person's fortune. In reality, she is a con artist. She gives Tirupathi a ring that actually has no powers.

Tirupathi ends up helping Animutyam apprehend a dangerous convict. However, Animutyam takes all the credit at the press meet, which Tirupathi also attends. Animutyam later reveals that he had rejected Tirupathi's application to the police academy. However, Jayavardhan notices Tirupathi on the news and tells him to pretend to be Baldev and put Ganguly in prison. Tirupathi accepts and visits Kolkata, where he is posted to Kalighat, impersonates Baldev, and frees Ganguly from Kundan and Rajeev. Tirupathi takes Ganguly to Jayavardhan, but Jayavardhan stabs him and reveals that Ganguly is his actual brother and not Baldev, as he had made him believe earlier, and leaves. Kundan and Rajeev track down Tirupathi and admit him to the hospital. When Thirupathi recovers, they narrate Baldev's past.

Past: Kundan and Rajeev are appointed as Baldev's assistants by A. K. Mishra, the Police Commissioner of Anti-Corruption Bureau, to acquire proofs of Baldev's corruption. Baldev is always accompanied by Venkat, a corrupt cop, as well as Kundan and Rajeev. He meets Ganguly and makes a deal with him for a huge ransom to hand over Tiwari, the only witness in the murder case of Gautham and his family, whom Ganguly and his brother Chotu killed on the former's order.

Meanwhile, Baldev falls in love with Vaishnavi, a philanthropist who also reciprocates his feelings. To get proof of Baldev's corruption, Kundan and Rajeev raid his house, where Vaishnavi is also present and livid with Baldev for maligning the goodwill of "Aasha Foundation" that she managed. Kundan and Rajeev also find a flash drive with a list of many cops whom they suspect of being involved with Baldev in his corruption scam. However, they are surprised that even they are on the same list.

Baldev's uncle reveals that Baldev's mother wanted to see him as a cop, and is admitted to a hospital for an important surgery. Baldev pays ₹10 lakh as fees for the surgery. However, at the selection, he is asked to pay a ₹10 lakh bribe, which is common for all candidates, according to the seniors. Baldev returned dejected but lied to his mother, saying he was selected to make her happy. The next morning, Baldev received posting orders and rushed to the hospital to show the same to his mother and uncle, but his mother died as she wished to forego the surgery to make Baldev a cop. Baldev then vowed to turn into a corrupt cop to pay the money on behalf of the honest candidates, who are about to join the police force without their knowledge. After this incident, Baldev and Vaishnavi get engaged.

Meanwhile, Baldev kills Chotu and arrests Ganguly for killing Gautham, with Tiwari serving as the chief witness. When Baldev is about to present Ganguly and Tiwari in the high court, Venkat sells the evidence documents for a huge bribe, along with information regarding Tiwari and Baldev. Acting upon this information, Ganguly's goons kill Baldev's uncle and then proceed to attack Baldev and Tiwari in court. However, Vaishnavi and Tiwari are killed in the hit, while Baldev escapes. Baldev retaliates and kidnaps Ganguly from Venkat's custody with the help of Kundan and Rajeev. In the process, he meets with a car accident in a hilly area, and his car explodes, thus killing him.

Present: Now realizing the truth, Thirupathi decides to set things right. Jayavardhan provides falsified evidence against the incumbent Chief Minister of Andhra Pradesh, claiming that he was the one backing Ganguly the whole time. After this incident, the CM is forced to step down and subsequently is arrested. Later, Jayavardhan gives his nomination for the post. Ganguly, despite being imprisoned, operates his crime regime from within.

Tirupathi rejoins the force, heads to Jayavardhan's house, and makes a deal with him to keep his post, provided that Tirupathi turns a blind eye to all of Ganguly's activities. Tirupathi then becomes close to Jayavardhan's PA, Raja. who becomes agitated after Jayavardhan insults him. Tirupathi introduces him to Nirupama and gets her to give him a ring to change his fortunes. However, the rings are actually cameras embedded inside the fake gemstone with a microchip to capture audio. With the help of this ring, Tirupathi exposes Jayavardhan's corruption to the media. Jayavardhan gets cornered and runs away "underground" along with his brother. In the process, he kidnaps Nirupama, Rajeev, Kundan, and Animutyam's family.

Meanwhile, Mishra, who has been following up on this case with close interest, reveals to Jayavardhan and Ganguly that Tirupathi is none other than Baldev. Right before the car explosion, Baldev is thrown off the car and falls onto a freight carrier, rendering him unconscious. The truck carries him to Hyderabad, and he is taken to the hospital, where Animutyam is provided with the case. Animutyam's wife had lost her brother named Tirupathi long back in her childhood and has been searching for him ever since. Realizing that Baldev is suffering from amnesia, Animutyam decides to pass him off as Tirupathi to keep her happy, but mainly to satisfy his wife's long search without spending much.

Mishra warns Jayavardhan and Ganguly that if Tirupathi discovers the truth, the consequences will be even deadlier. Tirupathi crashes into Ganguly's stronghold, where he arrests Jayavardhan, and a remorseful Venkat shoots Ganguly. Kundan, Rajeev, and everyone decide not to reveal the truth to Tirupathi/Baldev and thus spare him the anguish over his uncle's and fiancée's death. Tirupathi later marries Nirupama and lives happily ever after in Kolkata while still posing as Baldev.

== Cast ==
- Ravi Teja as ACP Baldev Sahay / Tirupathi
- Hansika Motwani as Nirupama
- Regina Cassandra as Vaishnavi
- Brahmanandam as Animutyam
- Prakash Raj as Aaravindh Kumar “A. K.” Mishra
- Mukesh Rishi as Home Minister Jayavardhan
- Sampath Raj as Ganguly Bhai
- Vinaya Prasad as Baldev's mother
- Kota Srinivasa Rao as Baldev's uncle
- Posani Krishna Murali as Raja
- Ajay as Kundan
- Subbaraju as Rajeev
- Aditya Menon as ACP Gautham
- Harish Uthaman as Kishore Vardhan / Chotu
- Brahmaji as Venkat
- Pragathi as Jayavardhan's wife
- Sumitra as Jayavardhan's mother
- Surekha Vani as Padma
- Saptagiri as Belahari
- Uttej as Tiwari
- Satyam Rajesh as Rajesh
- Sivannarayana as Rajesh's father
- Prudhvi Raj as Cabinet Minister
- Jeeva as Jayavardhan's aide
- Kasi Viswanath as Nirupama's father
- Viva Harsha as Nirupama's fan
- Raghu Karumanchi as Raghu
- Shankar Melkote as Doctor
- Surya as Dr. Nijoy
- Sameer as Doctor
- Satya Prakash as Feroz Bhai
- Narsing Yadav
- Gundu Sudarshan
- Chitram Srinu as the producer of Attarintiki Daredi
- Jogi Brothers as Constables
- Meena as Geetha

== Production ==
=== Development ===
Before release of the Gopichand Malineni's directorial Balupu, Ravi Teja listened to the script narrated by K. S. Ravindra, one of the writers of Balupu and finalized the film as his next project. Director cum producer Y.V.S. Chowdary, who produced Ravi Teja's Nippu in the past was announced as the producer of the film. The film was launched on 1 September 2013 at Y.V.S. Chowdary's office in Hyderabad. But because of his financial problems due to the commercial debacle of Nippu, Y.V.S. Chowdary walked out of the project. Later prominent Kannada producer Rockline Venkatesh agreed to produce the film. The film had a second opening ceremony on 11 December 2013 at Filmnagar in Hyderabad. Kona Venkat, S. Thaman, Allan Amin and Gautham Raju were roped in as the dialogue writer, music director, fights choreographer and editor of the film respectively and coincidentally they all were a part of Ravi Teja's Balupu. Apart from them, Jayanan Vincent, Brahma Kadali and A. Kumar Varma were roped in as the cinematographer, art director and production executive of the film respectively. The film's launch made headlines on 11 December 2013 (i.e. 11/12/13), a special calendar date that comes once in every 100 years. The film's title Power was declared on 24 January 2014. Incidentally, it was the title for Ravi Teja's film under Meher Ramesh's direction which never took off.

=== Casting ===
After Ravi Teja was signed to play the lead role, Hansika Motwani was roped in to play the female lead opposite Ravi Teja marking her first collaboration with him. She confirmed the news in her Twitter. She added "I can't reveal much about the character as it's premature to comment on it. But all I can say is that my role would be very unique and something that the audience have not seen so far. All this while, I've been playing bubbly and chirpy roles. But this time, my role is a performance-oriented one and I'm looking forward to it." Apart from them, Prakash Raj, Brahmanandam, Kota Srinivasa Rao, Brahmaji, Posani Krishna Murali, Mukesh Rishi, Ajay, Sampath Raj, Subbaraju, Sapthagiri, Surekha Vani and Jogi Brothers were said to be the other vital cast in the film during the press meet held on the second opening ceremony of the film. It was also reported that Ravi Teja would play the role of a police officer in this film. Soon after the launch of the film, reports emerged that the team is searching for an actress for the role of the second heroine and few actresses names were shortlisted. It was also reported that the makers recruited popular Hindi Television actress Ragini Khanna as the second heroine which marks her South Indian debut.

But Regina Cassandra was selected as the second heroine which she confirmed later. In an interview to The Times of India in early March 2014, Regina, about her role in the film, spoke "It's a big project for me and I'm quite excited about it. I like experimenting with my looks in films and I got a chance to do something radically different in terms of my appearance in Power. Besides, I have a strong characterization in the film. I hope I can pull off the role and get the audience in tune with the emotion in the film. It's going to be a challenging task for sure". After watching Suseenthiran's Pandiya Naadu, Harish Uthaman was selected for a negative role in the film by K. S. Ravindra. About his role, Harish said to the IANS that he would be playing the role of Sampath Raj's brother in this film. This marked his debut in Telugu cinema. It was revealed later that Ravi Teja's character is named ACP Bal Dev while Regina's character is named Vaishnavi.

=== Filming ===
The principal photography was planned for a start from 5 November 2013. However it couldn't start then for unknown reasons. It was said during the film's opening ceremony that the film would be extensively shot in Hyderabad and Kolkata from 11 December 2013. After much silent shoot, it was reported that a song was shot on Ravi Teja and Hansika at Orion Mall, Rajajinagar at Bangalore. The song was said to be a mix of Telugu and Hindi words in which the main phrase is Zindagi Na Milegi Dobara. It was choreographed by Vishnu Deva and the song was shot for five days. Later the film's shoot continued in Kolkata and Nagpur for a month. After shooting for a couple of weeks in Hyderabad and Bangalore, it was reported that the unit would proceed to Bangkok to shoot some action sequences. Meanwhile, the film's shoot continued in Hyderabad till Mid March and the next schedule started in Chennai from 17 March. After the team returned from Chennai, Regina joined the sets of the film on 25 March in Hyderabad. After completing shoot in locales of Hyderabad, the unit proceeded to Kolkata to start its next schedule of shoot from 6 April. It continued later at a house set in Annapurna Studios where Manam was shot. In the end of April, it was reported that the film's shoot would proceed later to Bangkok in the first week of May to shoot a fight sequence. There, a heavy chase sequence was planned to be shot in the supervision of Allan Amin which was said to have costed around ₹2 crores.

In the second week of May, the shooting continued at a police station set in Ramoji Film City where some crucial scenes were shot. Ravi Teja, Brahmaji, Ajay and Kota Srinivasa Rao along with few other fighters were involved in that shoot which lasted for 3 days. Days later, some of the crucial scenes of the film was shot at Tagore House in Ramoji Film City on the lead pair. By that time, it was said that the film is in its final stages of principal photography and may end soon. In the fourth week of May, some key drama and sentimental sequences were shot at Hyderabad in which the lead star cast took part. The next schedule started on 23 June at Hyderabad. After a silent shoot at Hyderabad, the song Nuvvu Nenu Janta was shot on Ravi Teja and Hansika at Bulgaria in the second week of July 2014. The pre-planned Bangkok chase schedule started on 22 July 2014 and lasted for 10 days. On 28 July 2014 a car blast happened in the film's sets while shooting an action sequence at a forest area situated 100 kilometers away from Pattaya. Luckily, none were injured and the shooting schedule completed on that day. Hansika cut short her vacation to join the film's sets for commencement of new schedule. A song shoot was planned on Ravi Teja and Hansika at Ramoji Film City from 6 August to 10 August. The song Notanki Notanki was shot there which completed on 14 August with which the principal photography came to an end.

== Soundtrack ==
S. Thaman was roped in to compose the music and background score for this film. The compositions were recorded from 25 November 2013 to 20 May 2014. The songs featured lyrics written by Bhaskarabhatla Ravi Kumar, Varikuppala Yadagiri Goud, Sirivennela Seetharama Sastry and Krishna Chaitanya. The soundtrack was released at a promotional event held at Shilpakala Vedika in Hyderabad on 8 August 2014, and was distributed by Junglee Music.

== Release ==
In the end of March 2014, it was reported that the film would release worldwide in June 2014. Though the makers planned to release the film on 28 June 2014 which marks the completion of one year of Ravi Teja's comeback film Balupu, the film's release was postponed to August 2014 because of delay in shooting schedules. CineGalaxy, Inc. & Asian Movies together acquired overseas distribution rights of this film. In late July 2014, it was reported that the makers planned to release the film in October 2014. In August 2014, it was confirmed that the film would release worldwide on 29 August 2014. However, it was postponed to 5 September 2014 to enjoy a solo release thus avoiding clash with Rabhasa which was scheduled for a release on 29 August. The film released in around 900 screens worldwide with the expected screen count being around 750 from India, 100 from United States and Canada and more than 25 from other overseas markets.

The film was dubbed in Hindi as Power Unlimited, in Bhojpuri as Dumdaar Inspector, and in Tamil as Malayappa.

It was named as Touch Chesi Chudu in 26 September 2013,

The film was renamed to Power on 7th March 2014, But in 14 March, Allu Arjun and Suriya were selected as Supporting roles in the movie

== Reception ==
=== Critical reception ===
Sify wrote "There is nothing novel about the movie. We have seen each scene before. It is a concoction of several movies. Power doesn’t come with the expected punch. Ravi Teja and some comedy scenes are plus points. The second half of the film is a let down. Overall, a regular commercial potboiler." Hemanth Kumar of The Times of India rated the film 3 out of 5 and wrote "Directed by K S Ravindra, the film gives ample scope to Ravi Teja to flex his muscles, besides bring the roof down with his gags. For most part of the film, the seriousness with which he approaches both his characters keeps the proceedings going. And truth be told, it's a treat to watch him play the role of a serious cop, just like he did in Vikramarkudu" and added "It would seem that Ravi Teja cannot go wrong when he's in great form and his exuberance more than makes up for all that might have gone for a toss in the film. However, when it comes to his latest film, Power, there's a catch. The film is a fine example to show what happens when an immovable object meets an unstoppable force. And the immovable object in this context is quite clearly the story, which is bogged down by the burden of multiple subplots it tries to carry". Suresh Kavirayani of Deccan Chronicle rated the film 3 out of 5 and wrote "He chooses a script which is an old formula, but he comes up with loads of entertainment. Though some of the scenes are typical film kind of, like wearing somebody’s khakhi uniform and solving cases like a police, but in the end it’s all entertainment. There are a few loopholes, but finally, ‘Power’ is a mass masala film with action, entertainment and glamour. It's a typical Ravi Teja film." Shekhar of Oneindia Entertainment rated the film 3 out of 5 and stated "Power is a powerful entertainer made to impress the fans of Ravi Teja. The film lacks freshness in story, but Bobby's amazing screenplay keeps you engrossed in the film. Apart from Mass Maharaja, Brahmanandam and Saptagiri will also rock the viewers. It is a paisa vasool entertainer for Ravi Teja fans." IndiaGlitz rated the film 3 out of 5 and summarized "A promising film that has borrowed ideas from here and there. But the Kona effect and Ravi Teja's powerhouse act deliver the film. Comparisons with other films can harm the movie's prospects a bit, though one is sure to like it more than any of RT's movies in recent times".

In contrast, Sridhar Vivan of Bangalore Mirror rated the film 2.5 out of 5 and wrote "To sum up; logically, the movie looks 'powerless', while comedy-wise, it is definitely 'powerful'. So, for those planning to watch a movie without any logic and purely for entertainment, then this may just be the right choice." Sangeetha Devi Dundoo of The Hindu wrote "It takes a special kind of nonchalance to package a film with a string of sequences, one illogical than the other, and lull the audience into believing that they are being entertained. Power tries hard to amuse and has a hangover of Kick and Vikramarkudu. Ravi Teja does his part well but the film itself offers nothing new" and remarked "Absurd fun, repackaged. ‘Power’ is only in the title." Behindwoods rated the film 1.75 out of 5 and stated "Astute editing, lustrous cinematography and Ravi's screen presence come as a relief to an easily predictable story with a slow screenplay. Brahmanandham's gimmicks, Ravi Teja's cute expressions and a relatively long story to narrate with a pacifying twist towards the end do grab our attention, but, it's too late." Filmyflavour rated the film 3 out of 5 and wrote "Power movie is a routine Telugu commercial film which has all the entertaining elements that you can try for this weekend"

=== Box office ===
The film collected a share of ₹3.86 crore on its second day. The film earned a share of ₹15 crore by the end of its first weekend at the worldwide Box office out of which ₹12 crore was earned at AP/Nizam Box office. The film's trade was affected on 19 September 2014 due to the release of Aagadu but it picked up from the next day. The film collected ₹16.3 crore at AP/Nizam Box office, ₹4 crore from other areas including Karnataka, the rest of India and the overseas markets taking its global first week total to ₹20.3 crore .
