= Bobby Kolli =

Indian filmmaker (born 1983)

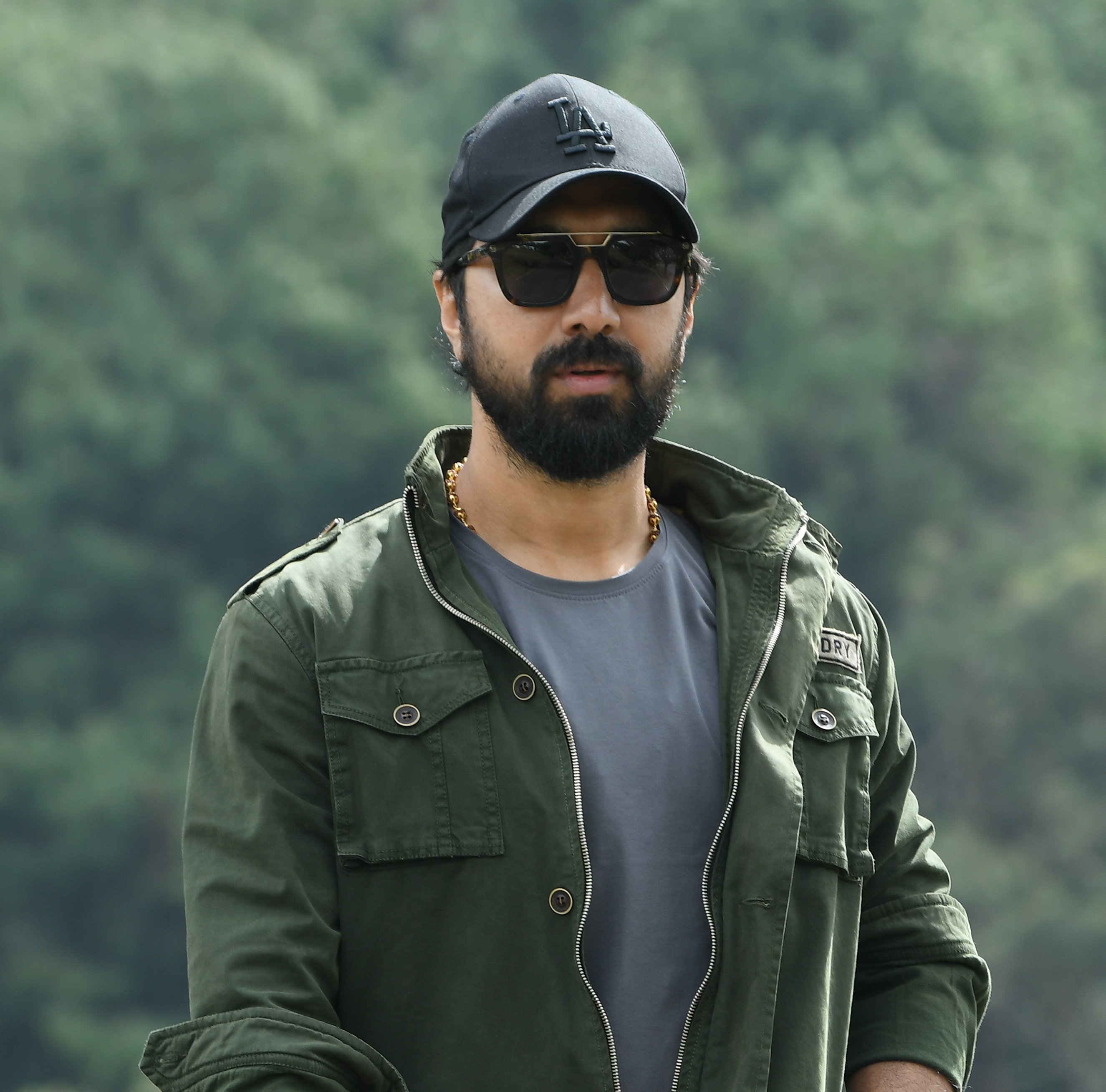
- Bobby in 2024
- Born: Kolli Santosh Ravindra; Guntur, Andhra Pradesh, India
- Other name: K. S. Ravindra
- Occupations: Film director; screenwriter
- Years active: 2007–present
- Spouse: Anusha
- Children: 1

Kolli Santosh Ravindra, professionally known as Bobby Kolli, is an Indian film director and screenwriter, who primarily works in Telugu cinema. He won the Best Debut Director Award, for Power (2014), at the Santosham Film Awards.

== Early life and career ==
Kolli Santosh Ravindra was born and brought up in Guntur, India. His father's name was Kolli Mohana Rao (died in 2022). After graduating with a B. Com degree, Ravindra started his film career in 2003 and joined writer Chinna Krishna. He went on to work under several directors including Dasaradh and Gopichand Malineni. Ravindra made his directorial debut with Power (2014), starring Ravi Teja.

His 2016 directorial, Sardaar Gabbar Singh, starring Pawan Kalyan was a commercial failure. His next film, Jai Lava Kusa (2017) where Jr NTR essayed three roles, was a blockbuster at the box office, grossing over ₹100 crore.

In 2019, Ravindra directed Venky Mama, starring Venkatesh and Naga Chaitanya. Despite receiving mixed reviews, the film was a profitable venture. Karthik Kumar of Hindustan Times wrote, "Ravindra tries to milk the real life family bond between Venkatesh and Chaitanya in Venky Mama, which relies heavily on the camaraderie between its lead actors." Hemanth Kumar in his review for Firstpost opined, "In his attempt to blend humour and sentiment, KS Ravindra (Bobby) turns Venky Mama into a bland drama, where the narrative moves from one set piece to another without leaving a strong impression."

His next film, Waltair Veerayya, starring Chiranjeevi and Ravi Teja, released in January 2023, for Sankranti. This was followed by Daaku Maharaaj in January 2025.

== Personal life ==
Ravindra is married to Anusha Dronavalli, the elder sister of chess grandmaster, Harika Dronavalli. The couple has a daughter born in 2018.

== Filmography ==
Key
†	Denotes films that have not yet been released

=== Director ===
Year	Title	Notes
2014	Power	
2016	Sardaar Gabbar Singh	
2017	Jai Lava Kusa	
2019	Venky Mama	
2023	Waltair Veerayya	
2025	Daaku Maharaaj	
2027	Kaaka †	

=== Writer ===
Year	Title	Writer
2007	Thayiya Madilu	Screenplay
2008	Bhadradri	Story
2008	Chaitrada Chandrama	Screenplay
2009	Chickpete Sachagalu	Screenplay
2010	Don Seenu	Screenplay
2011	Oh My Friend	Screenplay
2012	Bodyguard	Screenplay
2013	Balupu	Story
2014	Alludu Seenu	Story
2018	Pantham	Screenplay
