= Sardaar Gabbar Singh =

2016 film directed by K. S. Ravindra

- Theatrical release poster
- Directed by: Bobby Kolli
- Screenplay by: Bobby Kolli
- Dialogue by: Sai Madhav Burra
- Story by: Pawan Kalyan
- Produced by: Pawan Kalyan; Sharrath Marar; Sunil Lulla
- Starring: Pawan Kalyan; Kajal Aggarwal; Sharad Kelkar; Sanjjana
- Cinematography: Arthur A. Wilson
- Edited by: Gautham Raju
- Music by: Devi Sri Prasad
- Production companies: Eros International; Pawan Kalyan Creative Works; North Star Entertainment
- Distributed by: Eros International
- Release date: 8 April 2016 (India)
- Running time: 164 minutes
- Country: India
- Language: Telugu
- Budget: ₹75 crore
- Box office: est. ₹84 crore

Sardaar Gabbar Singh is a 2016 Indian Telugu-language action comedy film co-written and directed by Bobby Kolli, (credited as K. S. Ravindra) based on an original story by Pawan Kalyan. In the film, brave policeman Gabbar Singh (Kalyan) rescues the residents of Rathanpur when they are forced to face the wrath of Bhairav Singh (Kelkar), who unceremoniously usurps their land.

Sardaar Gabbar Singh is not a remake or sequel — it's an original script written by Pawan Kalyan as a spiritual successor to Gabbar Singh (2012), which was a remake of Dabangg.

Initially titled Gabbar Singh 2, the film began production on 21 February 2014 in Hyderabad with Sampath Nandi as the film. He later walked out of the film and was replaced by Ravindra. Principal photography began in May 2015 at Maharashtra. The film was renamed Sardaar Gabbar Singh in mid-2015. Filming took place extensively in Hyderabad, Secunderabad, Gujarat and Kerala before concluding in March 2016. Devi Sri Prasad composed the film's music, while Arthur A. Wilson and Gautham Raju served as the cinematographer and editor, respectively.

Sardaar Gabbar Singh was released worldwide on 8 April 2016, along with a Hindi dubbed version.

== Plot ==
The story is set in the princely town of Rattanpur, which is under the oppressive rule of Bhairav Singh (Sharad Kelkar), a ruthless landlord who exploits the villagers and forces them to obey his commands.

In an effort to maintain order in the region, the government assigns Sardaar Gabbar Singh as a policeman. Sardaar comes into conflict with Bhairav Singh, who controls the territory through fear and power. Sardaar also develops a romantic relationship with Princess Arshi (Kajal Aggarwal). His attempts to challenge Bhairav's dominance result in conflicts and betrayal culminating in a confrontation between the two.

The film blends action, comedy, and romance, with Pawan Kalyan's energetic performance and mass appeal driving the narrative.

== Cast ==
- Pawan Kalyan as Sardaar Gabbar Singh
  - Sathwik Varma as Young Gabbar Singh/Sardaar
- Kajal Aggarwal as Arshi Devi
- Sharad Kelkar as Raja Bhairav Singh
- Sanjjana as Gayathri, Bhairav Singh's wife
- Brahmanandam as Shekhar Singh Chauhan Rajput
- Ali as Samba
- Tanikella Bharani as Gabbar Singh's adopted uncle
- Mukesh Rishi as Hari Narayana
- Rao Ramesh as Ramesh Talwar
- Pradeep Rawat as Rajbeer (Bhairav Singh's father)
- Kabir Duhan Singh as Dhannu
- Urvashi as Madhumati
- Tisca Chopra as Geetha Devi
- Pooja Ramachandran as a girl in Ratanpur
- Posani Krishna Murali as Appaji (Sketch Master)
- Brahmaji as Raja Manikhyam IPS (Corrupted Police Officer)
- Sudigali Sudheer as Police Constable
- Raghu Babu as Govinda
- Dheer Charan Srivastav as Hakeem
- John Kokken as Pathaan
- Prabhas Sreenu
- Krishna Bhagavan as Mandu Raju
- Vineet Kumaras Bihar Local Gang Head
- Salim Baig
- Charandeep
- Narra Srinivas as Constable in Ratanpur
- Ashwini
- Aravind
- Shakalaka Shankar
- RK as Matka Seenu
- Venu Yeldandi
- Raai Laxmi as a bar dancer (cameo appearance in the item song "Tauba Tauba")

== Production ==
=== Development ===
In October 2012, Pawan Kalyan agreed to act in a film produced by Sharrath Marar, the former CEO of Maa TV, after completing work on Attarintiki Daredi (2013). Before the release of Dabangg 2 (2012), producer Bandla Ganesh registered the title Gabbar Singh in Hyderabad at the Andhra Pradesh Film Chamber, fueling speculation that this would be the remake of Dabangg 2 and the sequel to Gabbar Singh (2012), which was the official Telugu remake of Dabangg. Devi Sri Prasad and Jayanan Vincent were retained as the film's music director and cinematographer. Sampath Nandi was chosen to direct the film, and Marar was announced to oversee the production. At the same time, the film was reported to have a fresh storyline.

Kalyan wrote the story and clarified that the sequel would be based on an original script, not a remake of Dabangg 2. Considering the response to Attarintiki Daredi and the change in his on-screen image, Kalyan put pre-production on hold to make script changes. He added family drama elements and toned down the aggression of the lead character. Kalyan also decided to complete his work on Gopala Gopala (2015) first, while Nandi produced Galipatam (2014) on a low budget.

The film's official launch took place on 21 February 2014 in Hyderabad and was tentatively titled Gabbar Singh 2. L. Satyanand supervised the script, assisted by Sridhar Seepana and Kishore Gopu. Harish Pai was chosen as the creative head, and Gautham Raju was signed to edit the film. Due to delays in finalizing the female lead, Kalyan joined the sets of Gopala Gopala and worked on his political outfit, Jana Sena Party. The crew was instructed to regroup when Kalyan summoned them. Nandi left the project in November 2014 for undisclosed reasons. Vincent suggested K. S. Ravindra, who was then finalized as the new director. Sai Madhav Burra was chosen to write the dialogues.

The film was renamed Sardaar in late July 2015 to avoid paying royalty for the title Gabbar Singh. Kalyan chose this title since the character of Gabbar Singh, played by Amjad Khan, was referred to as Sardaar in Sholay (1975). Eros International announced on 15 August 2015 that it would co-produce the film with Pawan Kalyan Creative Works and Northstar Entertainment Pvt. Ltd., and the title was changed to Sardaar Gabbar Singh. Arthur A. Wilson replaced Vincent as the cinematographer due to creative differences between Vincent and Ravindra.

=== Casting ===
Kalyan sported a long hair and thick beard for a few important sequences in the film and a clean shaven look for the rest of the film. The makers were reportedly planning to introduce a fresh face for the film. Shruti Haasan and Asin were approached to play the female lead in the film. Navneet Kaur Dhillon was reported to be signed as the female lead in late May 2014. Akshara Haasan was approached for the same later who declined the offer gently saying that it would raise expectations on her next films and so responsibilities. Deepika Padukone, Sonakshi Sinha, Parineeti Chopra and Katrina Kaif were approached for the female lead role who turned down the offer citing unavailability of bulk dates and Anisha Ambrose, who made a cameo appearance in Gopala Gopala, was chosen by Kalyan as the female lead.

Ambrose was trained in the nuances of acting, perfecting dancing and several other aspects in the workshop sessions conducted by Ravindra in April 2015 before joining the film's sets. During the shoot of the first schedule, the makers saw Sharad Kelkar's performance in a soap opera and approached him to play the antagonist. Kelkar's inclusion in the cast was confirmed in June 2015. Charandeep, known for his work in the films Jilla (2014) and Pataas (2015), was signed as one of the antagonists in the film. Kajal Aggarwal, who initially declined to be a part of the film two years ago due to scheduling conflicts, was approached again in August 2015 for the female lead role. She met the film's unit and gave her consent, marking her first collaboration with Kalyan.

Kabir Duhan Singh confirmed his inclusion in the film's cast after completing a schedule and said that he would be seen as the one who handles all the activities of Kelkar in the film. During the scripting stage, there was a shorter role for a second, parallel female lead which was developed by the creative team on par with the first female lead after the shooting began. A source from the film's unit called it a "very energetic and active character". Trisha Krishnan was approached for the same in mid April 2015. Raai Laxmi's inclusion in the film's cast was confirmed on 2 September 2015. She was reported to play a crucial role in the film and to be appeared in a special song along with Kalyan. Speaking about her role, Laxmi said that her role is a crucial one and shall stay till the end of the film, adding that it "starts off as something in the beginning, it transitions into something else altogether as the movie unfolds".

Sanjjana was signed to play the role of a Gujarati princess in the film who subserviently follows her husband. She called it an important character with a "traditional and royal persona", adding that it is not "one of those blink-and-miss roles" and will be seen right from the start to the end. The film's unit revealed that her wardrobe consists largely of nine-yard sarees and heavy jewellery. In mid March 2016, Kajal revealed that she would be seen as a princess, who was from another era dressed in exquisite Indian attires which is a very contemporary character unlike Indu from Magadheera (2009).

=== Filming ===
Anand Sai and Rajesh and Archa Mehta were signed as the film's art director and costume designer respectively. Bhaskar Raju was signed as the film's production controller. The film's shoot began on 29 May 2015 at Malshej Ghat in Maharashtra. Some important sequences of the first schedule were shot in a special village set and Kalyan was expected to join the sets from the first week of June. The film's unit took a break after completing the first schedule since Kalyan was busy with his political commitments. A fight sequence featuring Kalyan and others were shot at the Aluminium factory located in Gachibowli in late July 2015. The second schedule was wrapped up on 5 August 2015, and filming continued at Ameerpet in mid August 2015.

The third schedule commenced on 8 September 2015 at Ramoji Film City, Hyderabad where key scenes were shot. Kalyan joined the film's sets on the next day and the schedule lasted till the end of September 2015. Filming of the item number commenced on 30 September 2015 in a set erected by Brahma Kadali at Ramanaidu Studios in Nanakramguda. Laxmi however chose not to call it an item number and termed it an "inspirational song that will everyone will love and remember for a long time". The song's shoot was wrapped up on 8 October 2015. Kalyan and the film's unit left for Gujarat in late October 2015 for location scouting. They returned to Hyderabad shortly and the next schedule commenced from 1 November 2015.

Few scenes on Kalyan, Ali, Brahmaji and others were filmed near the Le Palais Royal and Crown Villa Gardens in Secunderabad. A 25-day long schedule began from 15 November 2015 at Gujarat. Ali and Brahmaji joined the film's shoot shortly. Kajal joined the film's sets at Vadodara on 27 November 2015 and few scenes featuring her and Kalyan were filmed. She completed her part in the schedule on 4 December 2015. Kabir Singh Duhan joined the film's sets on the next day and scenes featuring him and Kalyan were filmed. After Kalyan completed his portions and left for Hyderabad, Marar said that scenes on the remaining cast would be filmed at Rajkot in Gujarat.

The final schedule, starting on 4 January 2016 at Hyderabad, was announced to last for a month and on its completion, the film's post-production activities were planned to be commenced. A village set worth ₹2 crore was erected in Hyderabad for the same in the place where Gabbar Singh was filmed. A schedule of 20 days was planned and all the principal cast participated in the shoot. The set featured an elaborate railway track, a market, and a group of houses and the cost escalated to ₹4.5 crore. Upon its completion, the next schedule commenced in Kerala in February 2016 and a few portions were filmed at the Athirappilly Falls. Upon its completion, the film's shoot continued in Hyderabad and by mid-February 2016, 90% of the film's talkie part was wrapped up.

After filming a marriage sequence on Kalyan and Kajal, a horse fair sequence, which forms a part of the climax, was filmed at Ramoji Film City in late February 2016. 100 horses, horsemen, many junior artists and a crew supporting three units worked simultaneously. 1000 members formed the teams and 40 artists from the film were present along with the horses, ten vintage cars, and many luxury cars. The pre-climax sequences were filmed in early March 2016 and a set was erected for the same. An elaborate sequence paying homage to Chiranjeevi was performed by Kalyan who was trained by a choreographer to ensure perfection. The filming of the climax sequences was resumed shortly. A duet on Kalyan and Kajal was filmed at Switzerland from 24 March 2016, upon whose completion, the principal photography was wrapped up.

== Music ==
Sardaar Gabbar Singh

Soundtrack album by Devi Sri Prasad
- Released: 20 March 2016
- Recorded: 2015–2016
- Genre: Feature film soundtrack
- Length: 24:13
- Language: Telugu
- Label: Eros Music
- Producer: Devi Sri Prasad

Devi Sri Prasad chronology
Nannaku Prematho (2016)	Sardaar Gabbar Singh (2016)	Janatha Garage (2016)

The film's soundtrack is composed by Devi Sri Prasad, who also scored music for its predecessor Gabbar Singh (2012). The soundtrack album features six tracks, with lyrics written by Ananta Sriram, Ramajogayya Sastry and Prasad himself. He remixed a popular song "Naa Koka Baagunda" from the Chiranjeevi-starrer Kondaveeti Raja (1986) for this film. Although being rumoured that the soundtrack will be released at a launch event held in Amaravati (the new capital city of Andhra Pradesh), the soundtrack was released on 20 March 2016, at H.I.C.C. Novotel in Hyderabad. Pawan Kalyan's elder brother, Chiranjeevi attended as chief guest. The album was released by Eros Music, the same day on streaming platforms.

The album received mixed reviews from critics. 123Telugu gave a positive review stating that the film has "a well packaged album from DSP". Behindwoods gave 2.5 out of 5 and stated "an average album from DSP". Indiaglitz gave 2.75 out of 5 and stated "A complete album for the masses and classes alike". Moviecrow gave 2.75 out of 5 stating "DSP's Sardaar Gabbar Singh has nothing extraordinary to offer and the tunes are largely tepid and run of the mill one". Bollywood Life gave 2.5 out of 5 stating "The album of Sardaar Gabbar Singh is decent but was bit of a let down".

Track list
No.	Title	Lyrics	Singer(s)	Length
1.	"Sardaar"	Ramajogayya Sastry	Benny Dayal	4:18
2.	"O Pilla Shubanalla"	Ananta Sriram	Vijay Prakash, Shreya Ghoshal	4:32
3.	"Tauba Tauba"	Ananta Sriram	Nakash Aziz, M. M. Manasi	4:25
4.	"Aadevadanna Eedevadanna"	Ramajogayya Sastry	M. L. R. Karthikeyan	2:49
5.	"Nee Chepakallu"	Ramajogayya Sastry	Sagar, Chinmayi	4:24
6.	"Khakhee Chokka"	Devi Sri Prasad	Simha, Mamta Sharma	3:45
Total length:				24:13

== Marketing ==
On the occasion of Pawan Kalyan's birthday (2 September 2015), the makers unveiled the first look poster and teaser through social media. On 14 January 2016, coincidinge with Sankranthi, the producer Sharath Marar unveiled three posters and a teaser though social media and YouTube. The second teaser crossed one million views upon its release through YouTube. Another teaser of the film was launched on 14 March 2016, through Telugu and Hindi, was well received by audiences. The trailer of Sardaar Gabbar Singh, was released on 20 March 2016, which coincided the audio launch function held in Hyderabad.

== Release ==
=== Theatrical ===
Sardaar Gabbar Singh was released on 8 April 2016, coinciding with Ugadi. However, in order to avoid clash with Allu Arjun's Sarrainodu and Mahesh Babu's Brahmotsavam, the makers postponed the release to 11 May 2016, the date where its predecessor Gabbar Singh (2012) was released. In January 2016, the makers rescheduled the release date to 8 April 2016. On 14 March 2016, Eros International which acquired the theatrical rights, also planned to release a Hindi dubbed version on the same day of its Telugu original's release date. Kalyan said in a statement that this film has a universal story and film making cannot be confined to a certain area or demographics and our film attempts a unique connect with India, especially the Hindi belt.

==== Screening and statics ====
Sardaar Gabbar Singh was released in more than 2600 screens worldwide, with 1800 theatres across India, and 800 theatres overseas, thus becoming the second biggest release from Telugu cinema, after Baahubali: The Beginning (2015). The advance bookings of the film kickstarted on 4 April 2016 before release, which had 100% of tickets being sold in the opening day, and 85% of the tickets in the opening weekend. The film had a biggest release in USA, with 100 theatres across 14 states, and was premiered on 7 April 2016, before the Indian release. Also the film is releasing globally in 42 countries marking the first Telugu film to release in that many countries.

=== Distribution ===
Eros International acquired the worldwide theatrical, digital, Hindi dubbing and music rights, apart from co-producing the film. The distribution rights of Nizam region were acquired by Dilip Tandon of Indra Films for ₹21 crore. The Ceded rights were sold to Narasimha Prasad Films for ₹10.5 crore; Vizag theatrical rights were sold to Kanthi Krishna Films for ₹7.2 crore. Godavari East and West thearical rights were sold to Anusri Films for ₹5.4 crore and Shanumka Films for ₹4.4 crore respectively. Guntur theatrical rights were sold for SV Cinemas for ₹5.5 crore. Krishna theatrical rights were sold to Tollywood Creations to an amount of ₹4.3 crore, while Nellore rights of the film were sold to SLNS Pictures for ₹2.7 crore. Karnataka theatrical rights were sold to Mars Pictures for ₹8.5 crore. Bhadrakali Pictures acquired the Tamil Nadu theatrical rights for ₹1.2 crore and The Hindi dubbing and North India release rights were secured by Eros for ₹6 crore. Overseas theatrical rights were sold to iDream Media for ₹10.5 crore; thus the film earned ₹87.2 crore from theatrical rights alone.

=== Home media ===
The television rights of the film were secured by Star India for ₹21 crore, along with its Hindi dubbed version. The film had a premiere on Star Maa on 17 July 2016, where it registered a TRP rating of 15.24, close to Baahubali: The Beginning and Srimanthudu (which had scored TRP ratings of 21.84 and 21.24 respectively).

== Reception ==
=== Box office ===
==== India ====
Sardaar Gabbar Singh registered an opening of ₹35 crore from the domestic box office (Andhra Pradesh and Telangana), with a share of ₹26 crore for its distributors. The film became the biggest opener for a Kalyan-starrer, surpassing Attarintiki Daredi (2013), which earlier earned ₹26.75 crore at the box office.

Further, Sardaar Gabbar Singh, surpassed Srimanthudu (2015), to become the second highest opener, after Baahubali: The Beginning (2015). However, the mixed word-of-mouth, have affected the collections, where it saw a dip in the box office in the second day. The film managed to collect ₹57 crore in the second weekend. As of 10 days, the film grossed approximately ₹84 crore against a budget of ₹75 at the worldwide box office by the end of its lifetime.

==== Other territories ====
The film premiered in 300 screens in North America on 7 April, where it collected $615,853 (₹4.10 crore) at the U.S. box office. As of 10 days, the film has earned $1,058,000 (₹7.04 crore).

=== Critical response ===
Sardaar Gabbar Singh received a mixed responses from critics.

Writing for The Times of India, Pranita Jonnalagada gave the film 2.5 out of 5 and stated, "This film surely is about a lot of guts (such lazy direction, anyone?), guns (even in songs!) and love (Pawan Kalyan has adorably dedicated this film to his fans)." A critic from Sify gave 2.75 out of 5 and stated "Pawan's show and Kajal are saving grace but narration is a letdown. Despite a good interval bang, post interval it drags on without much redeeming factors." Sreedhar Pillai of Firstpost summarised "Sardaar Gabbar Singh is strictly targeted at Pawan Kalyan’s huge fan base. It is all sound and fury, with no story and goes on and on." Karthik Keramalu of News18 gave the film 2.5 out of 5 satting that "The film's story loses its focus mid-way." Nandini Ramanath of Scroll, stated "Kalyan, who has written the movie, doesn’t only want to please his fans. He appears to be campaign mode (In real life, Kalyan is also a politician and is the founder of the Jana Sena Party). Scenes in Sardaar Gabbar Singh stink of electioneering and dialogues are of pure sloganeering. At 163 minutes then, Sardaar Gabbar Singh is one of the longest propaganda videos out there." Indiaglitz gave the film 3 out of 5 stating, "Pawan's one-man show. For those of you looking for him to do non-heroic comedy in khaki, this film has much stuff on platter."

A critic from The Indian Express, criticised the screenplay stating that "Sardaar Gabbar Singh is so lazily written that it is literally a struggle to sit through the film." Haricharan Pudipeddi of Hindustan Times gave a rating of 2 out of 5 stating "Even though Pawan Kalyan the actor shines in Sardaar Gabbar Singh, the writer fails miserably, and there’s so much he needs to learn from this debacle." Suresh Kavirayani of Deccan Chronicle gave the film 2.5 out of 5 stating "The film leaves one with the feeling that something was missing, perhaps the magic of Pawan Kalyan." Sangeetha Devi Dundoo of The Hindu stated "The film lacks a taut screenplay that can string together crowd-pleasing moments." Bollywood Life gave the film 2 out of 5 stating "Sardaar Gabbar Singh is definitely not worth the hype it has been receiving." Behindwoods gave the film a rating of 2.25 out of 5 stating, "Pawan Kalyan show all the way! But that's just not enough." Daily News and Analysis gave the film 2.5 out of 5 stating "It may be Pawan Kalyan’s take on the classic Sholay, but this movie is only for Pawan Kalyan fans."
