= Shobaraj =

Indian actor

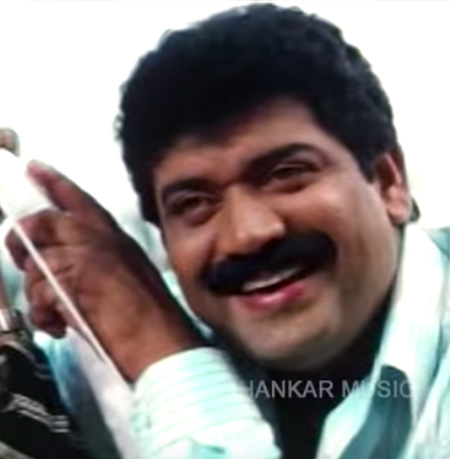
- Shobaraj in 2007 film Preethigaagi
- Born: Karnataka, India
- Other name: Shobhraj
- Citizenship: India
- Occupation: Film actor

Shobaraj is an Indian actor in the Kannada film industry. Some of his notable films include Yajamana (2000), Shabdavedhi (2000), Police Story (1996), and Sangliyana Part-3 (1997).

== Career ==
Shobaraj has been part of more than 250 Kannada films.

== Selected filmography ==
=== Kannada ===
- Chaitrada Premanjali (1990)...Veerabhadra
- Golibar (1993)
- Lockup Death (1994)...Soori
- Megha Maale (1994)
- Bangarada Kalasha (1995)...Murgyappa's son
- Police Story (1996)...Shobaraj "Black Tiger"
- Snehaloka (1999)...Police officer
- Shabdavedhi (2000)...D'Cruz
- Galate Aliyandru (2000)
- Lankesha (2001)
- Baava Baamaida (2001)
- Simhadriya Simha (2002)...Madesha
- Pakka Chukka (2003)...Sundar Raj
- Hey Nan Bheeshma Kano (2003)
- Hrudayavantha (2003)
- Mourya (2004)
- Swamy (2005)...Paramashiva
- Deadly Soma (2005)...Babaraj
- Valmiki (2005)...Desai
- Varsha (2005)
- Ayya (2005)
- Mandya (2006)...Cylinder Seena
- Suntaragaali (2006)...Krishnakumar Rao "Hawli Krishna"
- Madana (2006)
- Police Story (2007)...Shobaraj "Black Tiger"
- Shankar IPS (2010)
- Prince (2011)
- Double Decker (2011)
- Sri Chowdeshwari Devi Mahime (2012)
- Kranthiveera Sangolli Rayanna (2012)...Bhandari Babu
- Kalpana (2012)
- Cool Ganesha (2013)
- Mahanadi (2013)
- Power (2014)...Shivaiah
- Ramleela (2015)...Don Annaji
- DK (2015)
- Krishna-Rukku (2016)
- Bheeshma (2016)
- Sri Chakram (2016)
- Shalini (2016)
- Raktha Shasana (2016)
- 22 July 1947 (2016)
- Bablusha (2016)
- Golisoda (2016)
- Possible (2016)
- Leela (2016)
- Madha Mathu Manasi (2016)
- Jalsa (2017)
- Style Raja (2017)
- Vardhana (2017)
- Veera Ranachandi (2017)
- Roopa (2017)
- Yuddha Kanda (2017)
- Simha Hakida Hejje (2017)
- Yugapurusha (2017)
- Parchandi (2017)
- Heegondhu Dina (2018)
- Raja Loves Radhe (2018)
- 8MM Bullet (2018)
- Paradesi C/o London (2018)
- Chanaksha (2019)
- Howla Howla (2019)
- Bhanu Weds Bhoomi (2019)
- Gimmick (2019)
- Gadinadu (2020)
- Om Shanti Om (2020)
- Krishna Talkies (2021)
- Gulal.com (2021)
- Kotigobba 3 (2021)...Assistant commissioner
- 100 (2021)
- Govinda Govinda (2021)
- Sakath (2021)...Praveen Mahabala
- Rider (2021) as Inspector
- Shivaji Surathkal 2 (2023)...IG Manikvel
- Megha (2024)...Jagadish
- Guns and Roses (2025)...Rajendra
- The Devil (2025)
- Kaalaghatta (2026)

=== Tamil ===
- Jaisurya (2004)
- Veerappu (2007)
- Machakaaran (2007)
- Sandhithathum Sindhithathum (2013)
- Padikada Pakkangal (2025)

=== Telugu ===
- Palnati Brahmanayudu (2003)
- Vijayendra Varma (2004)

== Awards and nominations ==
Aryabhata Film Awards

- 1997: Best Villain — Chikka

== See also ==
- List of people from Karnataka
- Cinema of Karnataka
- List of Indian film actors
