= R. G. Vijayasarathy =

Indian critic and actor

- Born: Rajapur Gopalarao Vijayasarathy
- Died: February 24, 2013 (aged 62)
- Occupations: Film critic; actor

Rajapur Gopalarao Vijayasarathy was an Indian actor, journalist and film critic who was known for being the only writer of Kannada film reviews for Indo-Asian News Service and Rediff.com during the 2000s. He started his work in the 1970s writing for sports and business columns before transitioning into a film critic.

== Personal life ==
He studied at National College (Basavanagudi), Bangalore and was Vishnuvardhan's classmate. He died on 24 February 2013.

== Partial filmography ==
- Operation Antha (1995)
- Idu Entha Premavayya (1999)
- Upendra (1999)
- Shabdavedhi (2000)
- Vaalee (2001)
- Sainika (2002)
- Santhosha (2004)
- Hasina (2005)
- Pakka Chukka (2003)
- Mohini 9886788888 (2006)
- Sirivantha (2006)
- Krishna (2007)
- Preethiya Theru (2010)
- Aptharakshaka (2010)
- Naanu Nanna Kanasu (2010)
- Rame Gowda vs Krishna Reddy (2010)
- Keratam/Yuvan (2011)
- Taare (2011)
- Myna (2013)

Apart from acting, he worked as the dialogue writer for Vishnu Sena (2005). He was also a film distributor.

== Bibliography ==
- Vijayasarathy, R. G. (1979). Amar Singh.
- Vijayasarathy, R. G. (1979). Mahammad Nissar.
