= Sudeepa filmography =

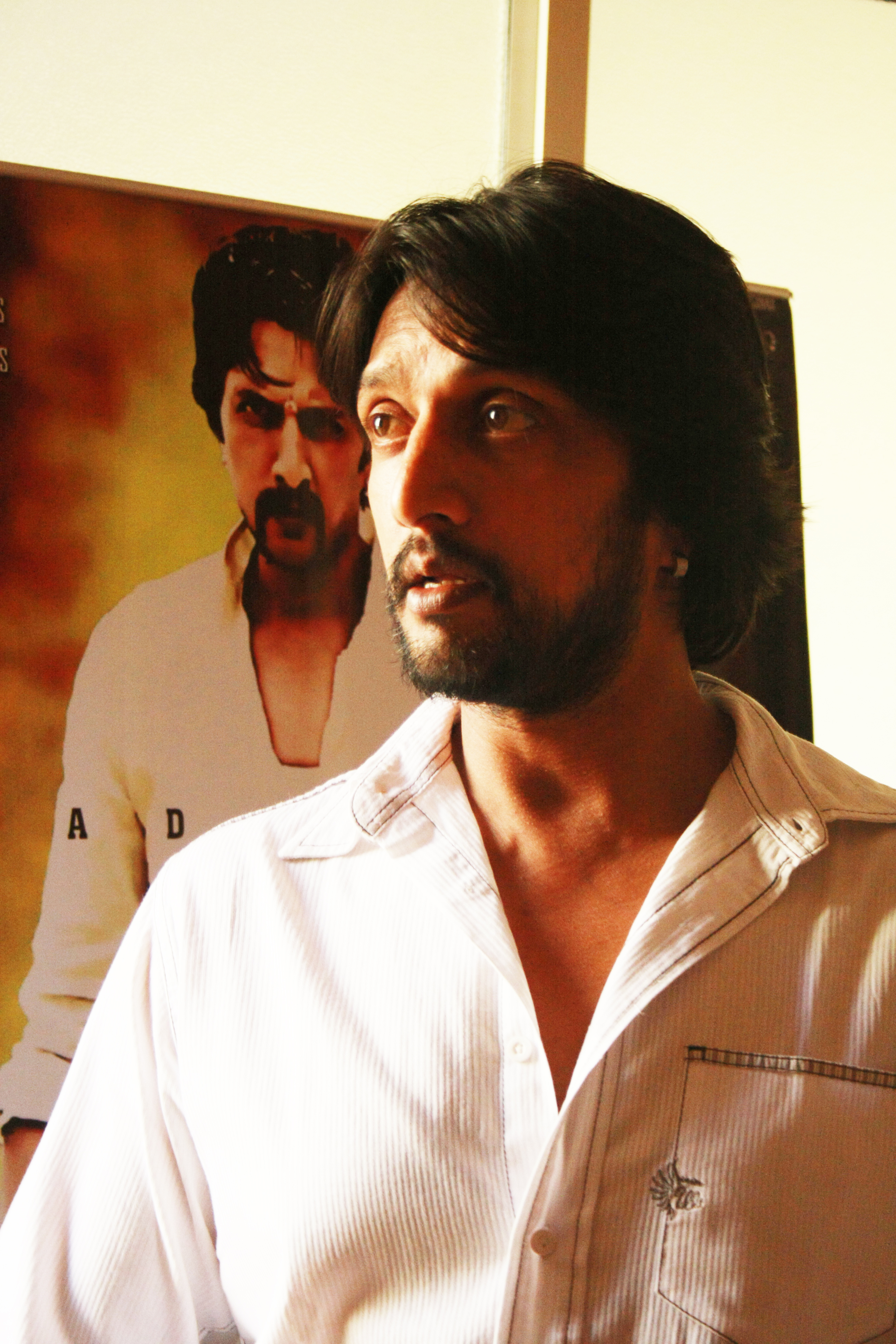
Sudeepa in 2013

Sudeepa is an Indian actor, director, producer, screenwriter, and television presenter who primarily works in the Kannada film industry, in addition to having worked in Hindi, Telugu and Tamil films. He is popularly known as Kiccha Sudeep. Sudeep began his acting career with supporting roles in Thayavva (1997) and Prathyartha (1999), before making his breakthrough with a leading role in the romance Sparsha (2000). He established himself in the critically acclaimed Huchcha (2001), and his performance earned him the nickname "Kiccha Sudeepa" by his fans. He has gone onto star in several commercially successful films such as Nandhi (2002), Kiccha (2003), Swathi Muthu (2003), My Autograph (2006), No 73, Shanthi Nivasa (2007), Mussanjemaatu (2008), Veera Madakari (2009), Just Maath Maathalli (2010), Rakta Charitra (2010), Vishnuvardhana (2011), Kempe Gowda (2011), Eega (2012), Maanikya (2014), Ranna (2015), Kotigobba 2 (2016), Hebbuli (2017), The Villain (2018), Sye Raa Narasimha Reddy (2019), Pailwaan (2019), Vikrant Rona (2022), Max (2024) and Mark (2025).

== Film ==
Key
†	Denotes films that have not yet been released

- Note: He was credited as Sudeep from 2000 to 2010 and as Sudeepa from 2010 onwards.
- Note: All films are in Kannada unless mentioned otherwise.

Year	Title	Role(s)	Notes	Ref.
1997	Thayavva	Ramu		
1999	Prathyartha	Sudeep		
2000	Sparsha	Sudeep		
2001	Huchcha	Sachidananda "Kichcha"		
2001	Vaalee	Shiva and Deva	Dual role	
2002	Chandu	Chandrashekar "Chandu"		
2002	Thuntata	Himself	Special appearance in the song "Sutha Mutha Yaar"	
2002	Dhumm	Varadharaj		
2002	Nandhi	Nandhi		
2003	Kiccha	Krishna Mohan "Kichcha"		
2003	Partha	Partha		
2003	Swathi Muthu	Shivayya		
2004	Ranga (S.S.L.C)	Ranga		
2004	Nalla	Prashanth "Pachhi"		
2005	Maharaja	Surya		
2005	Kashi from Village	Kashi		
2005	Gunna	Himself	Cameo appearance	
2005	Sye	Chakri		
2005	Nammanna	Muttanna		
2006	My Autograph	Shankar		
2006	Thirupathi	ACP Thirupathi		
2006	Jackpot	Himself	Cameo appearance	
2006	Hubli	Ajay Kumar Surnayak		
2006	C/o Footpath	Himself	Cameo appearance	
2007	No 73, Shanthi Nivasa	Raghu		
2007	Maathaad Maathaadu Mallige	Extremist leader	Cameo appearance	
2008	Gooli	Gooli		
2008	Mussanjemaatu	RJ Pradeep		
2008	Kaamannana Makkalu	Rama		
2008	Phoonk	Rajiv	Hindi film	
2008	Mast Maja Maadi	ACP Prathap		
2009	Meghave Meghave	Himself	Cameo appearance	
2009	Veera Madakari	Muttatti Sathyaraju and ACP Madakari IPS	Dual role	
2010	Rann	Jay V. Malik	Hindi film	
2010	Just Maath Maathalli	Siddharth		
2010	Phoonk 2	Rajiv	Hindi film	
2010	Aithalakkadi	Himself	Cameo appearance	
2010	Mr. Theertha	Theertha		
2010	Kichcha Huchcha	Krishna Murthy "Kiccha"		
2010	Veera Parampare	Teja		
2010	Rakta Charitra	DCP Mohan Prasad	Hindi–Telugu bilingual film	
2010	Rakta Charitra 2	DCP Mohan Prasad	Hindi–Telugu bilingual film	
2011	Kempe Gowda	Kempe Gowda		
2011	Police Story 3	Surya	Cameo appearance	
2011	Vishnuvardhana	Vishnuvardhana "Vishnu"		
2012	Eega	Sudeep	Telugu–Tamil bilingual film	
2012	Naan Ee	Sudeep	Telugu–Tamil bilingual film	
2013	Varadhanayaka	ACP Varadhanayaka		
2013	Bachchan	Bharath		
2013	Action 3D	Himself	Telugu film; cameo appearance	
2014	Rangan Style	Krishna	Cameo appearance	
2014	Maanikya	Vijay		
2015	Ranna	Bhargava "Chandu" Chandra		
2015	Luv U Alia	Himself	Cameo appearance	
2015	Baahubali: The Beginning	Aslam Khan	Telugu–Tamil bilingual film	
2015	Puli	Senadhipathy Jalatharangan	Tamil film	
2016	Apoorva	Terrorist	Cameo appearance	
2016	Kotigobba 2	Sathya "Shiva"	Kannada–Tamil Bilingual film	
2016	Mudinja Ivana Pudi	Satyam "Shivam"	Kannada–Tamil Bilingual film	
2016	Mukunda Murari	Murari		
2017	Hebbuli	Captain Ram		
2018	Raju Kannada Medium	Deepak Chakravarthy	Cameo appearance	
2018	Kicchu	Forest Officer	Cameo appearance	
2018	Ambi Ning Vayassaytho	Young Ambi		
2018	The Villain	Ram "Ravana"		
2019	Pailwaan	Pailwaan Krishna "Kichcha"		
2019	Sye Raa Narasimha Reddy	Avuku Raju	Telugu film	
2019	Dabangg 3	Bali Singh	Hindi film	
2021	Mangalavara Rajaadina	Himself	Cameo appearance	
2021	Kotigobba 3	Sathya "Shiva" and Shiva "Ghost"	Dual role	
2022	Vikrant Rona	Vikrant Rona		
2022	Ravi Bopanna	Vidyuth Verma	Cameo appearance	
2023	Kabzaa	Bhargava Bhakshi	Cameo appearance	
2024	Max	CI Arjun Mahakshay "Max"		
2025	Mark	SP Ajay Markandeya "Mark"		
2026	KD: The Devil	Kaala Bhairava	Cameo appearance	
2027	School Bus Voices †	TBA		
2027	Billa Ranga Baasha †	Billa, Ranga and Baasha		
2027	Devaraaya †	Krishna Devaraya		

=== Other credits ===
List of Sudeepa film credits as director, screenwriter and producer
Year	Title	Credited as			Notes
Year	Title	Director	Screenriter	Producer	Notes
2006	My Autograph	Yes	Yes	Yes	
2007	No 73, Shanthi Nivasa	Yes	Yes	Yes	
2009	Veera Madakari	Yes	Yes		
2010	Just Maath Maathalli	Yes	Dialogues		
2011	Kempe Gowda	Yes	Yes		
2014	Maanikya	Yes	Yes		
2016	Jigarthanda			Yes	
2016	Vaarasdaara			Yes	Television series
2017	Raajaru			Presenter	
2018	Sarkari Hi. Pra. Shaale, Kasaragodu, Koduge: Ramanna Rai			Presenter	
2018	Ambi Ning Vayassaytho		Yes	Yes	
2021	Kotigobba 3		Story		
2021	83			Presenter	Kannada dubbed version
2024	Gowri			Presenter	
2024	Max			Yes	
2025	Mark			Yes	

=== As Narrator ===
List of Sudeepa film narration credits
Year	Title	Notes	Ref.
2004	Jyeshta		
2012	Katari Veera Surasundarangi		
2012	Kraanthiveera Sangolli Raayanna		
2012	The Hitlist	Kannada version trailer	
2013	Shravani Subramanya		
2014	Aryan		
2014	Haggada Kone : End of the Rope		
2015	Bangalore 560023		
2016	Ricky		
2016	Jai Maruthi 800		
2016	Chakravyuha		
2016	Mandya to Mumbai		
2017	Raaga		
2018	Thayige Thakka Maga		
2018	Bharatipura Cross	Short film	
2019	Udgharsha	For trailer	

== Television ==
List of Sudeepa television credits
Year	Title	Role	Notes	Ref.
1996	Premada Kadambari	Unknown		
2010	Pyate Hudgir Halli Life	Mentor	Season 1	
2013–present	Bigg Boss Kannada	Host	13 seasons + 1 mini season	
2013	Super Kutumba	Guest		
2015	Majaa Talkies	Guest	Season 1 (Episode 33, 34)	
2016	Weekend with Ramesh	Guest	Season 2 (Episode 33, 34)	
2016	Kick	Guest	Season 1 (Episode 13, 14)	
2016	Vaarasdaara	Producer	2016 – 2017 (Total Episodes)	
2017	Sa Re Ga Ma Pa – Kannada	Guest	Season 13 (Episode 4)	
2019	The Kapil Sharma Show	Guest	Hindi show Season 2 (Episode 147, 200, 228, 229); 3 Times	
2019	Bigg Boss Hindi	Guest	Hindi show Season 13	
2020	Bigg Boss Telugu	Guest	Season 4	
2020	Anubandha Awards	Guest	Episode 14 / Part 2	
2021	Zee Kutumba Awards	Guest	Episode 5	
2021	Cookku with Kirikku	Guest	2 Episodes (Inauguration Episode)	
2022	Dance Karnataka Dance	Guest	Season 6 (Episode 23, 24)	
2022	Geluvina Saradara Vikrant Rona	Guest	Varamahalaxmi Festival special Talk Show	
2022	Bigg Boss Kannada OTT	Host	Season 1	

== See also ==
- List of awards and nominations received by Sudeepa
