= List of awards and nominations received by Sudeepa =

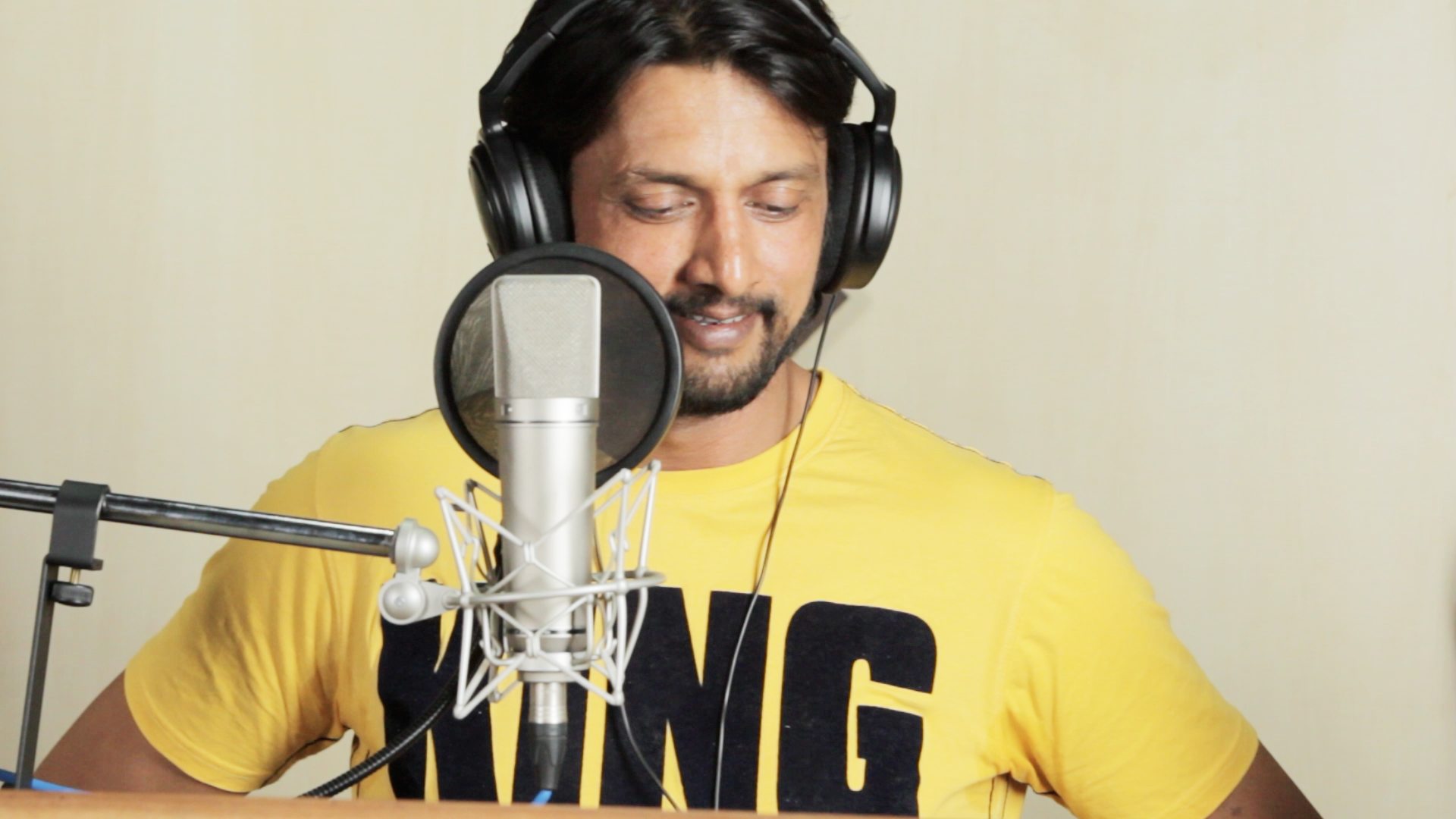
TeachAIDS Recording Session in 2013

The following is a list of awards and nominations received by Sudeepa, Indian actor and director who is most well known for his work in the Kannada language film industry. Notably, Sudeepa has won four Filmfare Awards South and is the only actor to have won three consecutive Filmfare Awards to date.

== Filmfare Awards South ==
The Filmfare Awards South is part of the Filmfare Awards, which are awarded to people working in the South Indian film industry, including the Tamil, Telugu, Malayalam and Kannada film industries. Sudeep is the only actor to date to have won three consecutive FilmFare Awards.

Year	Nominated work	Category	Result	Ref.
2001	Huccha	Best Actor – Kannada	Won	
2002	Nandhi	Best Actor – Kannada	Won	
2003	Swaathi Mutthu	Best Actor – Kannada	Won	
2006	My Autograph	Best Actor – Kannada	Nominated	
2008	Mussanje Maathu	Best Actor – Kannada	Nominated	
2010	Just Maath Maathalli	Best Actor – Kannada	Nominated	
2011	Kempe Gowda	Best Actor – Kannada	Nominated	
2012	Eega	Best Supporting Actor – Telugu	Won	
2013	Bachchan	Best Actor – Kannada	Nominated	
2016	Kotigobba 2	Best Actor – Kannada	Nominated	
2017	Hebbuli	Best Actor – Kannada	Nominated	
2023	Vikranth Rona	Best Actor – Kannada	Nominated	
2025	Max	Best Actor – Kannada	Nominated	

== Karnataka State Film Awards ==
The Karnataka State Film Awards are the most important awards given for Kannada cinema. They are given annually by the Government of Karnataka. The winners are selected by a jury headed by a chairman.

Year	Nominated work	Category	Result	Ref.
2002-03	Nandhi	Best Actor	Won	
2019	Pailwaan	Best Actor	Won	

== South Indian International Movie Awards (SIIMA) ==
The South Indian International Movie Awards (SIIMA) honours artists in the South Indian film industry.

Year	Nominated work	Category	Result	Ref.
2011	Kempe Gowda	Best Actor – Kannada	Nominated	
2012	Eega	Best Actor in a Negative Role – Telugu	Won	
2013	Bachchan	Best Actor – Kannada	Nominated	
2023	Vikrant Rona	Best Actor – Kannada	Nominated	
2025	Max	Best Actor – Kannada	Won	

== Nandi Awards ==
The Nandi Awards are the most important awards given for Telugu cinema. They are given annually by the Government of Andhra Pradesh. The winners are selected by a jury headed by a chairman.

Year	Nominated work	Category	Result	Ref.
2012	Eega	Best Villain	Won	

== Zee Cine Awards Tamil ==
The Zee Cine Awards Tamil are presented by Zee Tamil, a Tamil television channel to honour artists in Tamil cinema as well as Indian cinema.

Year	Nominated work	Category	Result	Ref.
2020	Contribution to Cinema	Pride of Kannada Cinema	Won	

== Zee Cine Awards ==
The Zee Cine Awards are presented by Zee Entertainment Enterprises, to honour artists in Hindi cinema.

Year	Nominated work	Category	Result	Ref.
2020	Dabangg 3	Best Actor in a Negative Role	Nominated	

== Chittara Star Awards ==
The Chittara Star Awards are presented by Chittara a Kannada magazine, to honour artists in Kannada cinema.

Year	Nominated work	Category	Result	Ref.
2023	Vikrant Rona	Best Actor - Male	Nominated	
2025	Max	Best Actor - Male	Nominated	

== TSR-TV9 National Film Awards ==
The TSR – TV9 National Film Awards are the most important awards given for the work in feature films in Indian Cinema.

Year	Nominated work	Category	Result	Ref.
2012	Eega	Best Actor Kannada	Won	
2012	Eega	Best Villain	Nominated	
2017	Hebbuli	Best Hero Kannada	Nominated	
2018	Ambi Ning Vayassaytho	Best Hero Kannada	Nominated	

== Suvarna Film Awards ==
The Suvarna Film Awards are presented by Asianet Suvarna, a Kannada television channel to honour artists in Kannada cinema. The awards were established in 2008.

Year	Nominated work	Category	Result	Ref.
2009	Veera Madakari	Favorite Hero	Won	
2009	Veera Madakari	Star Pair of the Year (with Ragini Dwivedi)	Nominated	
2010	Just Maath Maathalli	Best Director	Nominated	
2010	Just Maath Maathalli	Best Actor	Nominated	
2011	Kempe Gowda	Best Director	Nominated	
2011	Kempe Gowda	Favorite Director	Nominated	
2011	Kempe Gowda	Favorite Hero	Nominated	
2011	Vishnuvardhana	Best Actor	Won	

== Toronto After Dark Film Festival ==
The Toronto After Dark Film Festival (TADFF) is a showcase of horror, sci-fi, action and cult cinema held annually in Toronto, Canada at the Bloor Cinema. The festival premieres a diverse selection of feature-length and short-films from around the world including new works from Asia, Europe and North America.

Year	Nominated work	Category	Result	Ref.
2012	Eega	Best Villain	Won	
2012	Eega	Best Fight (Fly / Nani vs Sudeepa throughout the Film)	Won	

== Madrid International Film Festival ==
The Madrid International Film Festival held annually in Madrid, Spain.

Year	Nominated work	Category	Result	Ref.
2012	Eega	Best Supporting Actor	Nominated	

== Film Fan's Association Awards ==
Year	Nominated work	Category	Result	Ref.
2000	Sparsha	Best Actor – Kannada	Won	
2003	Swaathi Mutthu	Best Actor – Kannada	Won	

== CineMAA Awards ==
The CineMAA Awards are presented by Maa TV, a Telugu television channel to honour artists in Telugu cinema. The awards were established in 2004.

Year	Nominated work	Category	Result	Ref.
2012	Eega	Best Villain	Won	

== Vijay Awards ==
The Vijay Awards are presented by STAR Vijay, a Tamil television channel to honour artists in Tamil cinema. The awards were established in 2006.

Year	Nominated work	Category	Result	Ref.
2012	Naan Ee	Best Villain	Won	

== Edison Awards (India) ==
The Edison Awards, India are presented by MyTamilMovie.com and sponsored by Jet Airways, Videocon, etc. to honour artists in Tamil cinema. The awards were established in 2009.

Year	Nominated work	Category	Result	Ref.
2012	Naan Ee	Best Villain	Won	

== Times Film Awards ==
The Times Film Awards are presented by Times Of India, a newspaper group to honour artists in Indian Cinema including regional film industry.

Year	Nominated work	Category	Result	Ref.
2011	Vishnuvardhana	Bangalore Times Film Awards Best Actor – Kannada	Won	
2011	Kempe Gowda	Bangalore Times Film Awards Best Singer Male – Kannada (for the song "Hale Radio Haaki Haadu Keluva")	Nominated	
2012	Naan Ee	Chennai Times Film Awards Best Actor in Negative Role – Tamil	Won	
2012	Eega	Hyderabad Times Film Awards Best Actor in Negative Role – Telugu	Won	

== ViKa (Vijaya Karnataka) Web Cinema Awards ==
The ViKa (Vijaya Karnataka) Web Cinema Awards are presented by Vijaya Karnataka.

Year	Nominated work	Category	Result	Ref.
2021	Kotigobba 3	Best Actor	Nominated	
2022	Vikrant Rona	Best Actor	Pending	

== IBNLive Movie Awards ==
The IBNLive Movie Awards are presented by CW IBNLive.

Year	Nominated work	Category	Result	Ref.
2015	Ranna	Best Actor South	Nominated	

== Zee Dashakada Sambhrama ==
The Zee Dashakada Sambhrama awards presented by Zee Kannada, a Kannada television channel to honour social personalities in Karnataka.

Year	Nominated work	Category	Result	Ref.
2016	Achievement in Cinema	Entertainer of the Decade	Won	

== TV9 Sandalwood Star Awards ==
The Sandalwood Star Awards are presented by TV9 Kannada, a Kannada television channel to honour artists in Kannada cinema.

Year	Nominated work	Category	Result	Ref.
2011	Vishnuvardhana	Best Actor	Nominated	

== Zee Kannada Innovative Film Awards ==
The Innovative Film Awards were presented by Zee Kannada, a Kannada television channel to honour artists in Kannada cinema.

Year	Nominated work	Category	Result	Ref.
2009	Veera Madakari	Special Jury Award	Won	

== Hello Gandhinagara Awards ==
The Hello Gandhinagara Awards were presented by Hello Gandhinagara, a Kannada magazine to honour artists in Kannada cinema.

Year	Nominated work	Category	Result	Ref.
2004	Swaathi Mutthu	Special Award	Won	

== Asianet Kaveri Film Awards ==
The Asianet Kaveri Film Awards were presented by Kaveri Channel, a Kannada television channel to honour artists in Kannada cinema.

Year	Nominated work	Category	Result	Ref.
2000	Sparsha	Best New Face of The Year (Male)	Won	

== Videocon-Suprabhata Awards ==
The Videocon Suprabhata Awards were presented by Suprabhata, a Kannada television channel to honour artists in Kannada cinema.

Year	Nominated work	Category	Result	Ref.
2000	Sparsha	Best Newcomer Actor	Won	

== Bengaluru Press Club Awards ==
Year	Nominated work	Category	Result	Ref.
2021	Contribution to Cinema	Press Club Special Award	Won	

== Karnataka Wellfare Association Awards ==
Year	Nominated work	Category	Result	Ref.
2000	Sparsha	Special Award	Won	

== Other awards ==
This list includes awards, votes, etc. where Sudeepa appears by websites, organizations or magazines.

Year	Websites or Organizations or Magazines	Result or Rank	Recognition	Ref.
2012	Times of India	#1	"Bangalore Times Most Desirable Men 2012 - Top 25" list	
2012	Karnataka Rakshana Vedike (KaRaVe)	Won	"Abhinaya Chakravarthy" title	
2012	MovieCrow	Won	Best Villain for Naan Ee	
2012	Times of India	#8	"Top 10 Villains 2012" list	
2013	Forbes (India)	#22	"Top 100 Celebrities Of India" list	
2013	One India (now Filmibeat)	Won	"Best Actor of 2013 Kannada"	
2013	DS-MAX Properties Pvt Ltd	Won	"CCL 2014 - Champions" (with all the team members)	
2013	Times of India	#2	"Bangalore Times Most Desirable Men 2013 - Top 25" list	
2014	Times of India	#1	"Bangalore Times Most Desirable Men 2014 - Top 25" list	
2015	Times of India	#1	"Bangalore Times Most Desirable Men 2015 - Top 25" list	
2016	Outlook Social Media Awards	Won	Movie Star of the Year	
2018	Filmibeat Award for Best Actor - Kannada	Nominated	Ambi Ning Vayassaytho	
2018	Filmibeat Award for Best Actor - Kannada	Nominated	The Villain	
2018	B.B.M.P.	Won	Kempe Gowda Award	
2020	Kannada Sahitya Parishath	Won	Dr.Vishnuvardhan Kala Datti Award	
2021	Valmiki Mutt, Davanagere	Won	Valmiki Rathna	
2021	Kannada Sangha, UAE	Won	"Kannada Kala Bhooshana" title	
2021	Melana Gavi Mutt, Shivagange	Won	Shivaganga Shree Award	
2022	Raghavendra Temple Mutt, Mantralaya	Won	Anugraha Award	

== See also ==
- Sudeep filmography
