= Iniya =

Iniya or Ineya may refer to:

- Ineya, an actress
- Iniya (film)
- Iniya (TV series)
