= Chitra Shenoy =

Indian actress and producer

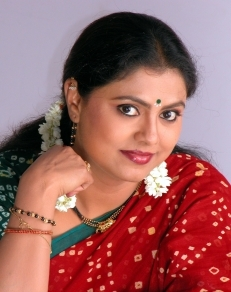
- Born: Hassan, Karnataka
- Occupation: Actor
- Spouse: Gurudas Shenoy (m. 1993)

Chitra Shenoy is an Indian actress and producer in South Indian movies and television series. She has acted in more than 600 films, predominantly in Kannada and Malayalam. She is known as the 'young mother' in the Kannada film industry having portrayed the role of a mother to almost all top stars in Kannada. In Malayalam she rose to fame with her role as Mammootty's mother in Rajamanikyam.

She became a house-hold name in Kerala playing the villainous mother-in-law character in the Malayalam serial Sthreedhanam. She owns the production company Good Company Productions.

== Personal life ==
She was born in a Sankethi Brahmin family to M. K. Vinayak and Saraswathi, as the youngest of two children at Hassan. She has an elder sister, Jyothi. She is a home science graduate. She is married to Gurudas Shenoy, a Kannada Film & Television Producer. They have a daughter Kushi Shenoy. Gurudas & Chitra Shenoy together run two television production companies - Dakshin Videotech and Good Company Productions. She currently resides at Bangalore with her family.

== Filmography ==
=== Kannada films ===
Year	Film	Role	Notes
1990	Mouna Horata		
1990	Aasegobba Meesegobba		
1993	Sidukabeda Singari		
1999	Chaitrade Chiguru		
1999	Hrudaya Hrudaya		
1999	Sneha	Vijay's mother	
1999	Premotsava	Sara	
2000	Shrirasthu Shubhamasthu		
2000	Preethsu Thappenilla		
2000	Nan Hendthi Chennagidale	Sumi	
2000	O Nanna Nalle		
2001	Nanna Preethiya Hudugi	Puttu's aunt	
2001	Asura	Gayathri	
2001	Chitte		
2001	Jilhadhikari		
2001	Grama Devathe		
2001	Jodi		
2001	Mafia		
2001	Amma Ninna Tholinalli		
2002	Balagalittu Olage Baa		
2002	Manasella Neene	Venu's mother	
2002	Law And Order		
2002	Ninagoskara		
2002	Ninne Preethisuve		
2002	Chandu	Vidya's mother	
2002	Ninagagi	Dr. Usha	
2002	Balagalittu Olage Baa	Gouri's mother	
2002	Roja		
2002	Love U		
2002	Prema Khaidi		
2003	Dhumm	Preethi and Vinod's sister	
2003	Pakka Chukka	Meena's mother	
2003	Khushi	Shashi's mother	
2003	Ondagona Baa		
2003	Daasa		
2003	Laali Haadu		
2003	Nanjundi		
2003	Dreams		
2003	Don		
2003	Sri Renukadevi		
2003	Dhad Dhad		
2003	Kasu Iddone Basu		
2003	Lankesh Patrike		
2003	Ramaswamy Krishnaswamy		
2003	Thayi Illada Thabbali		
2003	Preetisle Beku	Vishalu	
2003	Yardo Duddu Yellammana Jathre		
2003	Bangalore Bandh		
2004	Y2K		
2004	Kalasipalya	Janaki	
2004	Rama Krishna		
2004	Nalla	Dr. Sharada	
2004	Darshan		
2004	Rowdy Aliya	Lakshmi	
2004	Hasina	Jhuleka Begum	
2004	Srusti		
2004	Pakkadmane Hudugi		
2004	Kanakambari		
2004	Monda		
2004	Santhosha	Siddhu's mother	
2005	Aham Premasmi	Apsara's mother	
2005	Magic Ajji		
2005	Valmiki	Bharathi	
2005	Shastri	Kanaka's mother	
2005	Shambu		
2005	Hai Chinnu		
2005	Mental Manja		
2005	Anna Thangi		
2005	Love Story		
2005	Nenapirali		
2005	Boyfriend		
2005	Namma Basava		
2005	Thunta	Priya's sister-in-law	
2005	Gowramma		
2005	Jootata		
2005	Encounter Dayanayak		
2005	Ayya		
2006	Hatavadi	Balu's neighbour	
2006	Ambi		
2006	Julie	Margaret	
2006	Aishwarya	Aishwarya's mother	
2006	Hubli	Ajay Kumar Sir Nayak's mother	
2006	Uppi Dada M.B.B.S.		
2006	Neenello Naanalle	Janaki	
2006	Dattha		
2006	Mandya	Bhadrayya's wife	
2006	Thangigagi		
2006	Thandege Thakka Maga		
2006	O Priyathama	Ratna	
2006	Eesha		
2006	Thavarina Siri		
2006	Good Luck	Mandakini's mother	
2007	Poojari		
2007	Prarambha	Lady at house	Cameo appearance
2007	Sixer		
2007	Gunavantha	Padma	
2007	Sajani		
2007	No 73, Shanthi Nivasa	Shobha	
2007	Ugadi		
2007	Ee Rajeev Gandhi Alla		
2007	Preethigaagi		
2007	Masti		
2008	Gaja		
2008	Anthu Inthu Preethi Banthu		
2008	Kodagana Koli Nungitha		
2008	Ganga Kaveri	Kaveri's mother	
2008	Baa Bega Chandamama		
2008	Paramesha Panwala		
2008	Hani Hani		
2008	Honganasu		
2008	Shivani		
2008	Moggina Manasu	Rahul's mother	
2008	Payana		
2009	Nam Yajamanru		
2009	Love Guru		
2009	Raam		
2009	Rajani		
2009	Iniya		
2009	Bellary Naga		
2009	Venki		
2009	Abhimani		
2009	Yogi		
2010	Sihigaali		
2010	School Master		
2010	Porki		
2010	Shourya		
2010	Gandedhe		
2010	Cheluveye Ninne Nodalu	Sharada	
2010	Hoo		
2010	Kunidu Kunidu Bare		
2010	Hrudayadali Idenidu		
2010	Bisile		
2010	Huli		
2011	Take It Easy		
2011	Kempe Gowda	Kempe Gowda's mother	
2011	Sri Naga Shakthi		
2011	Naliyona Baara		
2011	Sogasugara		
2012	Kanchana		
2012	Dandupalya	Susheela's mother	
2012	Jeevana Jok-alli		
2012	Toofan		
2012	Saniha		
2012	AK 56		
2012	Chaarulatha		Dubbing Artist for Seetha
2013	Bulbul	Vijay's mother	
2013	Nenapinangala		
2013	Varadhanayaka	Siri's mother	
2013	Kotlallappo Kai		
2014	O Manase		
2014	Maanikya	Rathna	
2014	Power		
2014	Pandya	Rathna	
2015	Bangalore Metro		
2015	Fading Red	Shylaja	
2015	Aamanthrana		
2015	Ring Road	Mother	
2015	Rathaavara		
2015	Rudra Tandava		
2015	Buguri		
2016	Maduveya Mamatheya Kareyole	Kushi's mother	
2016	Kalpana 2		
2016	Bhujanga		
2016	Lakshmana		
2016	Viraat		
2016	John Jani Janardhan		
2016	Whatsupp Love		
2016	Jigarthanda		
2016	Akshathe		
2017	Chitta Chanchala		
2017	Raajakumara	Gayatri	
2017	Rajasimha	Sharada	
2017	Tarak		
2018	Shivu Paru	Lakshmi	
2019	Akhaada		Only dubbed versions released
2019	Adyaksha in America		
2019	Odeya		
2023	Tagaru Palya		
2023	Sheela		Simultaneously shot in Malayalam
2025	Marutha		

=== Malayalam films ===
Year	Title	Role	Notes
2005	Raajamanikyam	Muthulakshmi Ammal	
2006	The Don	Baba's wife	
2007	Ali Bhai	Anwar Ali's mother	
2007	Rock & Roll	Daya's mother	
2008	Calcutta News	Ajith's mother	
2009	Samastha Keralam PO	Saraswathi	
2012	Father's Day	Dr. Elizabeth Thomas	
2012	Best Wishes		
2013	Orissa		
2013	Kaanchi	Ammalu Amma	
2015	Thinkal Muthal Velli Vare	Injakkadu Rukminiyamma	Cameo Appearance
2016	Kavi Uddheshichathu..?	Soosamma	
2023	Sheela		Simultaneously shot in Kannada
2024	Porattu Nadakam	Lalithambal	

=== Telugu films ===
Year	Film	Role	Language
2006	Naidu LLB		Telugu
2010	Kantri Mogudu		Telugu
2018	2 Friends		Telugu

=== Tamil films ===
Year	Film	Role	Language
2006	Kadhale En Kadhale	Saradha	Tamil
2007	Muruga	Amudha's mother	Tamil
2010	Nagaram	Bharathi's mother	Tamil

=== Other language films ===
Year	Film	Role	Language
2013	Rickshaw Driver		Tulu
2014	Mr Joe B. Carvalho	Sundari Karla	Hindi

== Television ==
=== As actress ===
Year	Serial	Role	Channel	Language	Notes
	NO.55		DD Chandana	Kannada	
	Bhagya		DD Chandana	Kannada	
	Mane		DD Chandana	Kannada	
	Mane Kathe		DD Chandana	Kannada	
	Sahana		DD Chandana	Kannada	
	Anuraga		DD Chandana	Kannada	
1995	Mukhamukhi			Kannada	
1996	Itihaas		DD National	Hindi	
1996	"Chauraaha"		DD National	Hindi	by Sridhar Kshirasagar
1998	Mayamruga		DD Chandana	Kannada	
1998	Jwalamukhi		Udaya TV	Kannada	
2000	"Antaraal"		Star Plus	Hindi	by Girish Karnad
2002	Gupta Gamini		E TV	Kannada	
2009-2011	Maharani	Prakash's mother	Vijay TV	Tamil	
2011	Gaandhaari		Jaihind TV	Malayalam	
2012	Decent Family		Jaihind TV	Malayalam	
2012-2016	Sthreedhanam	Palat Sethulakshmi	Asianet	Malayalam	
2013	Achante Makkal		Surya TV	Malayalam	
2013	Karpoorada Gombe	Kaveri	Star Suvarna	Kannada	
2014	Swathi Muthu		Star Suvarna	Kannada	
2017-2019	Padmavathi		Colors Kannada	Kannada	
2018-2020	Ponnukku Thangamanassu	Sethulakshmi	Star Vijay	Tamil	
2019-2021	Pournami Thinkal	Rajalekshmi / Sethulakshmi	Asianet	Malayalam	Also Producer
2023–Present	Amruthadhare	Mandakini	Zee Kannada	Kannada	

=== As producer ===
Year	Serial	Channel	Language	Notes
2019-2021	Pournamithinkal	Asianet	Malayalam	Also actor
2020–2024	Kudumbavilakku	Asianet	Malayalam	
2023–2024	Kaathodu Kaathoram	Asianet	Malayalam	
2024–2025	Nooru Janmaku	Colors Kannada	Kannada	
2025–present	Durga	Zee Keralam	Malayalam	

== Awards ==
Won

- Film Fans Best Supporting Actress Award-1999 from Chennai for the film "Chaitrada Chiguru".
- Sir.M.Visvesvaraya National Mahila Sreeratna Award-2000 at Mantralayam.
- Arybhatta Award as a producer for “Kshamaya Dharithtri”
- Asianet television award for Most popular actress 2013
- Asianet television award for Best Character actress (Special Jury mention) 2014
- Asianet television award for Most popular actress 2015

Nominated

- Asianet television award for Best Character actress 2013
- Asianet television award for Best Character actress 2014
- Asianet television award for Most popular actress 2014
- Asianet television award for Best Character actress 2015
- 2nd IIFA Utsavam for performance in a Supporting role female-Kannada 2017

== Reality shows ==
- Munch Stars (Asianet)
- Ningalkkumakam Kodeeswaran (Asianet)
- Sell Me The Answer (Asianet)
- Badai Bungalow (Asianet)
- Kumkumam (Kairali TV)
