= Manish Borundia =

Indian actor

- Born: Chennai, Tamil Nadu, India
- Other name: Akash
- Occupation: Actor
- Years active: 1999–present

Manish Borundia is an Indian actor and model who has appeared in lead and supporting roles in Tamil, Hindi, Kannada and Telugu films. He has done around 95 ad films and been a brand ambassador for Sprite. He has done few music albums and gained popularity for a Malayalam music album.

== Career ==
Born and brought up in Chennai, Manish began a modelling career while managing his father's business and regularly appeared in commercials and music videos. He became acquainted with Ajith Kumar during their time as models, and often visited the actor during his film shoots. Ajith requested Manish to play a minor acting role in Amarkkalam (1999) after the original actor did not turn up, and thus Manish made his first on-screen appearance. In the early 2000s, Manish continued to portray supporting roles in Tamil films, often as the lead actor's friends, and notably appeared in S. J. Surya's Kushi (2000), Saran's Parthen Rasithen (2000), Gautham Vasudev Menon's Minnale (2001) and Jeeva's 12B (2001).

Manish then signed on to appear in the lead role of P. C. Sreeram's Vaanam Vasappadum (2004) and was attached to the project for six months, before being dropped due to his strong Hindi accent. The role was eventually taken by Karthik Kumar. Manish starred in his first lead role through the Kannada film Jootata (2005), appearing alongside Dhyan and Richa Pallod. For the project, he took up the stage name of Akash, though the film did not perform well commercially and received negative reviews from critics. His second Kannada film, Nannusire, also under performed commercially but Manish's role was described as "short, sweet and attractive." He also portrayed a character in Arjun's Tamil film, Madrasi (2006). As his acting career failed to take off, Manish took up a job in Hong Kong before moving to Bengaluru to continue looking after his family's jewellery business.

In 2019, he made a comeback through Jagan Shakti's Hindi drama film Mission Mangal, based on the life of scientists at the Indian Space Research Organisation (ISRO) who contributed to the Mars Orbiter Mission. Featuring among an ensemble cast including Akshay Kumar and Vidya Balan, Manish appeared in a supporting role of an ISRO employee.

== Filmography ==
Year	Film	Role	Language	Notes
1999	Amarkkalam	Kishen	Tamil	
2000	Kushi	Shiva's friend	Tamil	
2000	Parthen Rasithen	Sarika's brother	Tamil	
2001	Minnale	Manish	Tamil	
2001	Kushi	Siddhu's friend	Telugu	
2001	12B	Shakti's coworker	Tamil	Uncredited role
2005	Jootata	Vicky	Kannada	
2006	Madrasi	Raja	Tamil	
2008	Nannusire	Harsha	Kannada	
2019	Mission Mangal	Kaushal Saini	Hindi	
