= Chamkaisi Chindi Udaysi =

- Official poster
- Directed by: A R Babu
- Written by: Manju Mandavya (dialogue)
- Produced by: Anasuya Ramachandrappa; Jeevan S
- Starring: Komal; Nidhi Subbaiah
- Cinematography: Ashok Kashyap
- Edited by: K M Prakash
- Music by: P. B. Balaji
- Production company: Sri Datthathreya Movies
- Release date: 3 July 2009
- Country: India
- Language: Kannada

Chamkaisi Chindi Udaysi is a 2009 Indian Kannada-language comedy film directed by A. R. Babu and starring Komal and Nidhi Subbaiah. The film is an unofficial remake of the Hindi film Deewane Huye Paagal (2005), which itself is based on the English film There's Something About Mary (1998).

The film was released on 3 July 2009 alongside Kabaddi (2009).

== Cast ==
- Komal as ‘Bottu’ Seena
- Nidhi Subbaiah as Kamala
- Kiran Srinivas as Ganesh
- Shobharaj as Don Janny
- Dharma as Pratap
- Rahul
- Giri Dinesh
- Umashree
- Mukhyamantri Chandru
- R. N. Sudarshan
- Jaggesh (cameo appearance)

== Production ==
The film was initially titled Operation Kamala, but the title was rejected given that the phrase was a popular slogan of Bharatiya Janata Party, Karnataka. The scenes involving Komal on a jet ski were shot in Thailand.

== Soundtrack ==
The music was composed by P. B. Balaji. The song "Colour Colour Duniya" is based on "Ah Mudhal Akku" from the 2005 Tamil film Jithan.

Track listing
No.	Title	Lyrics	Singer(s)	Length
1.	"Color Color Duniya"	V. Nagendra Prasad	Shankar Mahadevan, Vidyalakshmi
2.	"Rab Ne Banadiya"	Hrudaya Shiva	Benny Dayal, Haricharan, Pop Shalini
3.	"Bejanagi Premisu"	Jayanth Kaikini	Tippu, Shreya Ghoshal
4.	"Jaya Ho"	Kaviraj	Karthik, Komal, Sharan, Sunitha, Ranina Reddy
Total length:				19:47

== Reception ==
A critic from Mid-Day wrote that "If comedy is what you are seeking, then this movie will dissappoint [sic] you". A critic from Bangalore Mirror opined that "Chamkaisi Chindi Udyasi is a hotchpotch of various Hindi and English films garnished with stale jokes". Film critic R. G. Vijayasarathy of IANS stated that "'Chamakaayisi...' has many loopholes but it is worth a watch for the entertaining dialogues".
