= Jootata =

- VCD cover
- Directed by: N. S. Shankar
- Screenplay by: N. S. Shankar
- Based on: Poochakkoru Mookkuthi by Priyadarshan
- Produced by: K V Vijaykumar; M Govindraj; Sadhana Shankar
- Cinematography: S. Krishna
- Edited by: Guna
- Music by: R. P. Patnaik
- Production company: Lakshmi Vinayaka Entertainments
- Release date: 1 April 2005
- Country: India
- Language: Kannada

Jootata is a 2005 Indian Kannada-language romantic comedy film directed by N. S. Shankar. A remake of the 1984 Malayalam film Poochakkoru Mookkuthi, the film stars Dhyan, Richa Pallod and Akash (in his Kannada debut).

== Cast ==
- Dhyan as Sanjay a.k.a. Sanju
- Richa Pallod as Nandini
- Akash as Vicky
- Rangayana Raghu as Mallangowda
- Tulasi as Nandini Devi Mallangowda
- Sathyajith as Gujiri Govindanantha
- Komal as Eeshwar Khan
- Abhinayashree as Sanjay's neighbor
- Srinath
- Chitra Shenoy
- Sanketh Kashi
- Sharan
- Yashwant Sardeshpande
- M. N. Suresh
- Sundeep Malani

== Production ==
The film was launched at Kanteerava Studios in October 2004 on the day of Vijayadasami. The film was completed by December 2004.

== Soundtrack ==
The soundtrack of the film was composed by R. P. Patnaik.

Track listing
No.	Title	Lyrics	Singer(s)	Length
1.	"Yenaitho"	K. Kalyan	Srinivas, Nanditha	5:18
2.	"Jootata"	Kaviraj	Master Kishan	3:31
3.	"O Sona"	Kaviraj	Rajesh, R. P. Patnaik	4:31
4.	"Maachu Bella"	Anand	Swarnalatha	3:48
5.	"Baare Baare Nanna"	Kaviraj	L. N. Shastri	4:32
Total length:				21:40

== Reception ==
R. G. Vijayasarathy of IANS praised it for remaining faithful to the Malayalam version but criticized the performance of the lead actors and said it pales in comparison to the superlative performances of the character artists. A critic from Rediff.com wrote that "Jootaata is still enjoyable despite several minus factors, mainly because of a good plot and competent performances from character artistes". A critic from Viggy wrote that "On the whole, Jootata disappoints if you have high hopes on N. S. Shankar's movie".
