= Nannusire =

- Directed by: Velu Priyan; Santosh Suragimath
- Produced by: Ashok
- Starring: Rahul; Gayathri; Keerthi
- Music by: Premji Amaren
- Release date: 30 October 2008
- Country: India
- Language: Kannada
- Budget: ₹1.5 crore

Nannusire (transl. My breath) is a 2008 Indian Kannada-language romantic drama film directed by Velupriyan and Santosh Suragimath. The film stars newcomers Rahul, Gayathri, and Keerthi.

== Cast ==
- Rahul as Abhishek
- Gayathri as Thanmayi
- Keerthi as Sahana
- Manish as Harsha
- Dattanna
- Kishori Ballal

== Soundtrack ==
The music was composed by Premji Amaren. In a music review, a critic wrote that "Premji’s Kannada debut is noticeably ahead of his Tamil soundtracks!"

Track listing
| No. | Title | Singer(s) | Length |
|---|---|---|---|
| 1. | "Hesarina Melu Preeti" | Rajesh Krupa, Nanditha | 4:29 |
| 2. | "Munjaane Suryananne" | Sujatha | 3:49 |
| 3. | "Nannusire Nannolagirvuarage" | Naveen, Swetha | 4:27 |
| 4. | "Neenu Nanagaagi" | Karthik, Srinivas | 5:02 |
| 5. | "Ninagaagiye Ninagaagiye" | Sri Ram, K. S. Chithra | 4:17 |
| 6. | "Sanje Beachinalli" | Premji Amaren, Vasundhara Das | 4:26 |
| Total length: | | | 26:30 |

== Reception ==
A critic from Bangalore Mirror wrote that "Nannusire turns out to be just another film by newcomers that could well not have been made". Film critic R. G. Vijayasarathy of IANS wrote that the film is "Just an ordinary fare".
