= Appu (2002 film) =

2002 Indian Kannada-language film by Puri Jagannadh

- Film poster
- Directed by: Puri Jagannadh
- Screenplay by: Puri Jagannadh
- Dialogues by: M. S. Ramesh; R. Rajashekhar
- Story by: Puri Jagannadh
- Produced by: Parvathamma Rajkumar
- Starring: Puneeth Rajkumar; Rakshita
- Cinematography: K. Datthu
- Edited by: S. Manohar
- Music by: Gurukiran
- Production company: Poornima Enterprises
- Distributed by: Sri Vajreshwari combines
- Release date: 26 April 2002
- Running time: 140 minutes
- Country: India
- Language: Kannada

Appu is a 2002 Indian Kannada-language romantic action film directed by Puri Jagannadh and produced by Parvathamma Rajkumar under Poornima Enterprises. The film stars debutants Puneeth Rajkumar and Rakshita, alongside Avinash, Srinivasa Murthy and Sumithra. The music was composed by Gurukiran, while cinematography and editing were composed by K. Datthu and S. Manohar.

Appu was released on 26 April 2002 and completed a 200-day run in theatres. Due to this film, Puneeth Rajkumar came to be known as "Appu" among the masses. The film was remade in Telugu in 2002 as Idiot, in Tamil in 2003 as Dum, in Bengali in 2006 as Hero, in Bhojpuri in 2007 as Sasura Bada Seyana and in Bangladeshi Bengali in 2008 as Priya Amar Priya - making it the second Kannada film to be remade in Bengali in both India and Bangladesh after Anuraga Aralithu. It was the third Kannada movie to be remade in four languages after School Master and Anuraga Aralithu.The film was re released on 14th March 2025 coinciding with Puneeth's birthday and grossed around ₹2 crores in 5 days.

== Plot ==
Aparnadh “Appu”, a carefree guy, is the son of Venkata Swamy, a head constable. Venkata Swamy wants Appu to clear the IPS exams and become an Inspector. One night, Appu, after playing carrom with his friends, is thrashed by a rival gang, but he is rescued by a girl Suchitra alias "Suchi", who pays his hospital bills and donates her blood. She is gone from the hospital by the time Appu regains consciousness. Appu learns about Suchi from his friends and falls in love with her. Suchi later turns out to be the daughter of Rajashekhar, the city commissioner. Appu meets Suchi in the college and proposes to her.

When Suchi does not accept his proposal, Appu teases her which leads Suchi to complain about him to Rajshekhar, who takes Appu to the police station and severely thrashes him before being rescued by Venkata Swamy and SI Sudarshan. Appu becomes more adamant to win over Suchi and proposes to Suchi, who later accepts his feelings. Rajshekhar discovers their relationship and hires goons to thrash Appu. Suchi discovers this and runs to help him, but meets with an accident.

Appu and Suchi get admitted to the same hospital, where they unite. Rajshekhar arranges her wedding with another person, to which she openly opposes and attempts suicide. Appu arrives and rescues her, but Rajshekhar still wants to get Suchi married to a man of his own choice, he also engages goons to kill Appu. Appu finally escapes all the troubles and meets the DGP to ask for help to marry Suchi. The DGP finally suspends Rajshekhar and arranges Appu's wedding in the police station. In the aftermath, Appu finally clears the IPS exams with flying colors.

== Cast ==
- Puneeth Rajkumar as Appu
- Rakshita as Suchithra "Suchi", Appu's love interest
- Avinash as Rajashekhar, Bangalore City Commissioner, Suchithra's father
- Srinivasa Murthy as Head Constable Venkatswamy, Appu's father
- Sumithra as Appu's mother
- Ashok as SI Sudarshan
- Satyajith as SI Veeranna
- Bullet Prakash as Police constable
- Honnavalli Krishna as Police constable
- Prithviraj as DGP
- Nithin Gopi
- Honnavalli Srikanth
- Appu Venkatesh
- Yogi
- Escorts Srinivas
- Shankar Rao as Professor
- Hulivana Gangadharayya as Professor
- Rajeev Rathod
- Badri Narayan
- Tumkur Mohan as Yadav
- Fayaz Khan
- V. K. Mohan
- NGEF Ramamurthy
- Theertha Prasad
- Channa
- Kamala shree
- Vinayak Joshi as Gunda
- Keerthi
- Hemashree

== Production ==
After the success of Yuvaraja (2001), Puri Jagannadh was approached by the Rajkumar family to introduce their third son Puneeth Rajkumar to make his onscreen debut as the lead actor. Puri gladly accepted the opportunity. Jagannadh had originally decided to make the film's script into a Telugu film first, but at Dr. Rajkumar's insistence he first made it in Kannada. Rakshitha, the daughter of cinematographer B. C. Gowrishankar, made her acting debut with the film, and she went on to play the same character in the Telugu and Tamil remakes as well. Shiva Rajkumar named the film Appu, which was Puneeth Rajkumar's pet name.

== Soundtrack ==
Appu

Soundtrack album by Gurukiran
- Released: 18 January 2002
- Genre: Feature film soundtrack
- Length: 27:20
- Language: Kannada
- Label: Akash Audio
- Producer: Gurukiran

Gurukiran chronology
Raa (2001)	Appu (2002)	Chandu (2002)

Gurukiran composed the film's background score and music for its soundtrack, with the lyrics written by Upendra, Sriranga and Hamsalekha. The soundtrack album consists of six tracks.

Track list
No.	Title	Lyrics	Singer(s)	Length
1.	"Taliban Alla Alla"	Upendra	Puneeth Rajkumar
2.	"Baare Baare Kalyana"	Sriranga	Udit Narayan, Chithra
3.	"Panavidu Panavidu"	Hamsalekha	Rajkumar
4.	"Ellinda Aarambhavo"	Sriranga	Udit Narayan, Chithra
5.	"Jolly Go Jolly Go"	Hamsalekha	Shankar Mahadevan
6.	"Aa Devara Haadidu"	K. Kalyan	Rajkumar

== Reception ==
In 2002, before the release of this movie, journalist Ravi Belagere whipped up a storm with his cover-page article in his popular tabloid Hai Bangalore writing about the buzz around the film and posed a big question to his readers: Can the final horse from the stables of Dr Rajkumar's family win the race? A critic from Chitraloka wrote that "This is a film for all. Buy a ticket and have two and half hours of good summer vacation in Bangalore theatres". According to National Award-winning film critic M K Raghavendra, "Puneeth's characters matched the Kannada sentiments.The rebellious attitude of Appu in the movie represented the locals who felt discriminated by the state during Bengaluru's growth as a cosmopolitan city. The angle of the generation gap in the movie connected well with the youngsters".
