= DK (film) =

- Film poster
- Directed by: Vijay
- Produced by: Rakshita
- Starring: Prem; Chaitra Chandranath
- Cinematography: S. D. Anand
- Edited by: Srinivas P. Babu
- Music by: Arjun Janya
- Production companies: Prem Dreams; JJ Cine Productions
- Release date: 13 February 2015
- Running time: 141 minutes
- Country: India
- Language: Kannada

DK is a 2015 Indian Kannada satirical film directed by Vijay Kampali, formerly known as Udaya Prakash, who also directed Kalla Malla Sulla and Auto Raja. Produced by actress Rakshita, the film stars Prem and Chaitra Chandranath. Actress Sunny Leone features in a special item song Sesamma, which marks her Kannada film debut. The film's score and soundtrack was composed by Arjun Janya, and the first Kannada film to feature 7.1 surround sound. The film opened across Karnataka on 13 February 2015.

== Plot ==
DK, a street smart man, and Subbalakshmi, a politician's daughter, are rivals who have never lost a bet in their lives. But soon their enmity turns into romance.

== Cast ==
- Prem as DK
- Chaitra Chandranath as Subbulakshmi
- Rishikumara Swamy
- Sharath Lohitashwa as MP Shive Gowda
- Shobaraj
- Sunny Leone as an item number "Sesamma"

== Production ==
Director Udaya Prakash renamed himself Vijay Kampali before beginning this venture. He approached director-actor Prem to star in this satirical comedy. The film was earlier said to be based on the real life of Karnataka politician D. K Shivakumar. However the makers refuted the statement and claimed the story was original, not inspired by any person or any other film. Prem had to lose weight in preparation for the role. Chaitra Chandranath, who had a difficult beginning to her career, as her debut film Viraat was shelved, was cast in the lead female role. Filming took place extensively in Mysore.

== Music ==
Anand Audio bought the music rights of the film for about ₹25Lakhs. Music composer Arjun Janya worked on songs for the film. The folk song "Seshamma Seshamma" features the actress Sunny Leone in a special appearance. Another song titled "India Pakistan Ondagoythu" which featured the names of Modi, Sonia, M. Karunanidhi and J. Jayalalithaa and their relationships was turned down by four playback singers due to the controversial lines, until finally singer Hemanth Kumar recorded the song.

=== Track list ===
DK

Soundtrack album by Arjun Janya
- Released: November 2014
- Genre: Feature film soundtrack

No.	Title	Lyrics	Singer(s)	Length
1.	"Sesamma"	Prem	Mamta Sharma, Prem	5:14
2.	"Sum Sumne"	Sudarshan	Rajesh Krishnan, Anuradha Bhat	4:40
3.	"Banda Banda"	Sudarshan	Prem	4:04
4.	"Besari Marada"	Sudarshan	Palak Muchhal, Shankar Mahadevan	3:48
5.	"India-Pakistana"	Sudarshan	Hemanth Kumar	4:15
