= Nidhi Subbaiah =

Indian actress

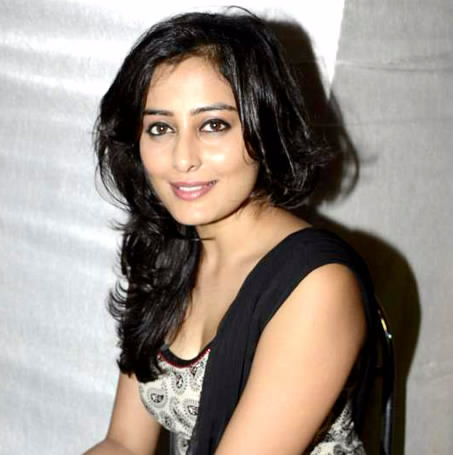
- Born: 16 February 1985 (age 41); Kodagu, Karnataka, India
- Education: SJCE, Mysore
- Occupations: Actress, model
- Years active: 2009–present

Nidhi Subbaiah (born 16 February 1985) is an Indian actress and model, who has appeared in various television advertisements and films, she is known for her performance in successful Kannada movies such as Pancharangi (2010) and Krishnan Marriage Story (2011). She made her Bollywood debut with Oh My God and Ajab Gazabb Love (in a lead role).

== Early life ==
Nidhi was born on 16 February 1985 in the Kodagu district of Karnataka as the only child to Bollachanda Subhash Subbaiah and Jhansi Subbaiah. Soon afterwards, her family later moved to Mysore, where she spent most of her childhood and completed her education.

Nidhi had made her mark in sports by winning gold medals at national level sports meets in sailing while she was studying II PUC in Mysore. She also has the credit of winning three gold medals in a calendar year at the sports meet in sailing events at Visakhapatnam in Andhra Pradesh and at Chilka Lake in Orissa. Besides being a sportsperson of repute, Nidhi was also a Naval NCC cadet who won the best cadet award in the year 2004.

An alumnus of St. Joseph's Central, Mysore, Mahajanas PU college, Mysore, she went on to study Civil Engineering from Sri Jayachamarajendra College of Engineering (SJCE), Mysore. She quit in the second year as her modelling career took off and this ultimately led her to pursue a career in acting.

== Personal life ==
Subbaiah married her longtime boyfriend entrepreneur Lavesh Khairajani in 2017 in Coorg, Karnataka. They were divorced in 2018.

== Career ==
She first ventured into modelling, appearing in various television commercials, with Fair & Lovely being the most notable, through which she landed her first acting assignment. She made her acting debut with Abhimani in 2009, which did not fare well at the box office. She has also acted in Suri's Anna Bond that features her alongside Puneeth Rajkumar and Priyamani. The film did fairly well at the box office. She then made a special appearance in Poornima Mohan's School Days. Nidhi's first Bollywood outing was Oh My God, which starred Akshay Kumar. She had a small role in the movie. Nidhi's first Bollywood movie as a leading actress was Ajab Gazabb Love, where she co-stars with Jackky Bhagnani and then went on to star in many more films.

She participated in the reality show Bigg Boss Kannada (season 8) as one of the contestants and got evicted on 4 July 2021 as the first contestant to be evicted in the second innings.

== Filmography ==
Year	Film	Role	Language	Notes
2009	Abhimani	Aparna	Kannada	
2009	Chamkaisi Chindi Udaysi	Kamala	Kannada	
2009	Sweet Heart	Meenakshi	Telugu	
2010	Krishna Nee Late Aagi Baaro	Lakshmi	Kannada	
2010	Pancharangi	Ambika	Kannada	Nominated, Filmfare Award for Best Actress – Kannada
2011	Veera Bahu	Devi	Kannada	
2011	Krishnan Marriage Story	Khushi	Kannada	SIIMA Special Appreciation Award-Kannada; Nominated, Filmfare Award for Best Actress – Kannada
2012	Anna Bond	Divya	Kannada	SIIMA Award for Best Actress in a Supporting Role - Kannada
2012	OMG – Oh My God!	Shweta Tiwari	Hindi	
2012	Ajab Gazabb Love	Madhuri Singh Chouhan	Hindi	
2016	Direct Ishq	Dolly Pandey	Hindi	
2016	Love Shagun	Tia	Hindi	
2016	Nanna Ninna Prema Kathe	Rekha/Preeti	Kannada	
2017	5G	Rashi	Kannada	
2019	Ayushman Bhava	Chukki	Kannada	Nominated- SIIMA Award for Best Actress in a Supporting Role - Kannada
2024	Chef Chidambara	Mona	Kannada	
2024	UI	Sunaina	Kannada	
2025	Edagaiye Apaghatakke Karana	Pooja	Kannada	

Television

2021 - Bigg Boss Kannada Season 8
2021 - Bigg Boss Second Innings
