= Rakshita =

Indian actress

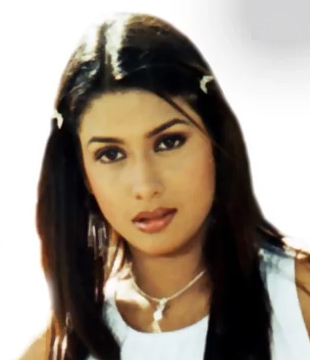
- Rakshitha in 2004 Kannada film Kalasipalya
- Born: Shweta; Bangalore, Karnataka, India
- Occupations: Television personality; film producer; actress
- Years active: 2002-2022
- Spouse: Prem (m. 2007)
- Children: 1
- Parents: B. C. Gowrishankar; Mamatha Rao

Shweta, known by her stage name Rakshita, is an Indian television personality, film producer and former actress known for her work in Kannada films, addition to a few Telugu and Tamil films.

== Early life ==
Rakshita was brought up in Bangalore. She is the daughter of B. C. Gowrishankar, famous cinematographer in Kannada films and actress Mamatha Rao. Rakshita attended a short acting course under Krishnamurthy Kavathar's tutelage before entering films. Pursuing a bachelor's degree in computer applications (BCA) from Sri Bhagawan Mahaveer Jain College in Bangalore at the time, she discontinued during the first year. She then enrolled in a correspondence course for a Bachelor of Arts degree in 2001. During this time, she was signed to play the lead opposite Puneeth Rajkumar in Appu (2002) by producer Parvathamma Rajkumar who gave her the name Rakshita.

== Career ==
=== Actor ===
Rakshita started her career with the Kannada movie Appu with Puneeth Rajkumar. She also acted in remakes of the same movie in Telugu titled Idiot and in Tamil titled Dum alongside Silambarasan. She became a top Kannada heroine when Kalasipalya became a big hit. Apart from Puneeth Rajkumar, she formed a successful pair with all the top Kannada heroes of the time - Upendra, Sudeep, Darshan and Aditya. She has also acted with big time heroes such as Chiranjeevi, Nagarjuna Akkineni, Mahesh Babu, Jr NTR, Jagapathi Babu, Vishnuvardhan, V. Ravichandran, Shivarajkumar, Vijay, Ravi Teja, and Silambarasan.

After her marriage to director Prem, she cut down on her acting assignments and took over film-making. She turned producer for the prestigious Jogayya directed by Prem, starring Shivarajkumar in the lead (100th movie).

=== Politics ===
Rakshita announced that she had joined the Badavara Shramikara Raitara (BSR) Congress in March 2012, after politician B. Sriramulu announced of founding it, which eventually happened in 2013. She served as the President of the women's wing of the BSR Congress till April 2013, when she quit the party citing differences with the party members over contesting elections from a constituency of her choice at the Karnataka Legislative Assembly election. In the same month, she joined the Janata Dal (Secular). She again had differences with the party over its ignoring her plea for a ticket to contest from Mandya at the 2014 general election, and quit in March 2014, joining the Bharatiya Janata Party (BJP). Following this, she became subject to media and public ridicule, and was called a "party-hopper", having changed 3 political parties in two years.

== Personal life ==
She is married to film director Prem since 9 March 2007.

== Filmography ==
=== As producer ===
Year	Title	Language	Notes
2011	Jogayya	Kannada	
2014	DK	Kannada	
2022	Ek Love Ya	Kannada	

=== As actress ===
Year	Title	Role	Language	Notes	Ref.
2002	Appu	Suchitra	Kannada		
2002	Idiot	Suchitra	Telugu		
2002	Dhumm	Preethi	Kannada		
2003	Dum	Suchitra	Tamil		
2003	Pellam Oorelithe	Raji	Telugu		
2003	Nijam	Janaki	Telugu		
2003	Sivamani	Pallavi	Telugu		
2003	Gokarna	Pooja	Kannada		
2003	Vijayasimha	Baby	Kannada		
2004	Love	Ganga	Kannada		
2004	Lakshmi Narasimha	Dancer	Telugu	Special appearance	
2004	Andhrawala	Rakshita	Telugu		
2004	Madhurey	Anitha	Tamil		
2004	Avale Nanna Gelathi	Amrutha	Kannada		
2004	Kalasipalya	Priya	Kannada		
2005	Yashwanth	Chitra	Kannada		
2005	Ayya	Suchitra	Kannada		
2005	Kashi From Village	Parvathi	Kannada		
2005	Andarivaadu	Cheetila Chinni/Janki	Telugu		
2005	Jagapathi	Lavanya	Telugu		
2005	Deadly Soma	Jyothi	Kannada		
2006	Suntaragaali	Manjula	Kannada		
2006	Neenello Naanalle	Siri	Kannada		
2006	Mandya	Parvathi	Kannada		
2006	Odahuttidavalu	Gowri	Kannada		
2006	Hubli	Priya	Kannada		
2006	Tananam Tananam	Vanaja	Kannada		
2007	Ee Rajeev Gandhi Alla	Shravya	Kannada		
2007	Thayiya Madilu	Deepa	Kannada		
2022	Ek Love Ya	Herself	Kannada	Cameo	

=== Television ===
- 2010 – Swayamvara – Host (Suvarna TV Kannada)
- 2014 – Thaka Dhimi Tha Dancing star – Judge (ETV Kannada)
- 2015 – Putani Pantru Season 2 – Judge (Suvarna TV Kannada)
- 2017 – Comedy Khiladigalu – Judge (Zee Kannada)
- 2017 – Dance Karnataka Dance- Family War - Judge (Zee Kannada)
- 2018 – Comedy Khiladigalu Season 2 - Judge (Zee Kannada)
- 2018 – Dance Karnataka Dance Little Masters - Judge (Zee Kannada)
- 2018 – Comedy Khiladigalu Championship - Judge (Zee Kannada)
- 2019 - Dance Karnataka Dance - Family War (Season 2) - Judge (Zee Kannada)
- 2019 - Comedy Khiladigalu Season 3 - Judge (Zee Kannada)
- 2020 - Comedy Khiladigalu Championship Season 2 - Judge (Zee Kannada)
- 2021 - Dance Karnataka Dance Season 5 - Judge (Zee Kannada)
- 2022 - Dance Karnataka Dance Season 6 - Judge (Zee Kannada)
- 2022 - Comedy Khiladigalu Season 4 - Judge (Zee Kannada)

=== As dubbing artist ===
- Amy Jackson (The Villain)
