= Neenello Naanalle =

- Directed by: Dinesh Babu
- Screenplay by: Dinesh Babu
- Story by: Veeru Potla
- Based on: Nuvvostanante Nenoddantana (Telugu)
- Produced by: K. Manju; D. K. Devendra; G. Chandrashekar
- Starring: Vishnuvardhan; Aniruddh; Rakshita
- Cinematography: H. C. Venu
- Edited by: P. R. Soundar Raj
- Music by: Ramesh Krishna
- Production company: Lakshmishree Combines
- Release date: 28 July 2006
- Running time: 157 minutes
- Country: India
- Language: Kannada

Neenello Nanalle (transl. I am where you are) is 2006 Indian Kannada-language romance film directed by Dinesh Babu, and is a remake of the 2005 Telugu film Nuvvostanante Nenoddantana. It stars Vishnuvardhan, Aniruddh and Rakshita in pivotal roles. Anant Nag, Srinivasa Murthy, Ramakrishna and Chitra Shenoy feature in supporting roles. The title of the film comes from a track of the same name of the 1982 Kannada film Chalisuva Modagalu starring Rajkumar. This movie was the 2500th Kannada movie to be released.

The film tells the story of an NRI on returning to India falls in love with a village girl and how he goes about winning over her and her overprotective farmer brother. The plot of the film also drew comparisons to the Bollywood films, Maine Pyar Kiya (1989) and Pyaar Kiya To Darna Kya (1998). Upon theatrical release, the film was received well by critics, who mainly praised the performances. The film was a box office success.

== Plot ==
Santosh (Aniruddh) is a rich, city boy, born to billionaire parents and brought up in London. On the other hand, Siri (Rakshita)is a traditional, simple desi girl from Karnataka who was brought up by her only brother, Veera (Vishnuvardhan). He is heartbroken when their father marries another woman and throws them out of the house, humiliating them on the way. Their mother dies and her tomb is built on the small land which they own until the zamindar tells them that it is his land, since their mother had taken a loan from the man. Veera volunteers to work day and night, to pay off the loan as long as they don't tear down his mother's tomb. The Zamindar agrees and the local station master helps them. Veera and Siri grow up. One day, Lalitha, Siri's best friend invites Siri to their house as she is getting married. Lalitha's cousin, Santosh also arrives on the same day with his mother, Janaki (Chitra Shenoy).

Slowly Santosh and Siri fall in love but Janaki does not approve as Siri is not rich. She wants Santosh to marry her brother's business partner's daughter Dolly. Janaki humiliates Siri as well as Veera, who arrives there and both are thrown out of the house after Janaki accuses them of trying to entice and trap Santosh. When Santosh learns of this, he goes to Siri's house and pleads with her brother to accept him. Veera gives him a chance, just like he was given a chance by the Zamindar when he was little. Santosh is tasked with taking care of the cows, cleaning up after them and growing more crops than Veera by the end of the season; if he does not, Santosh will be thrown out of the village and can never see Siri again. The Zamindar and his son are not happy as the Zamindar's son wanted to marry Siri. With them and Maya and her father trying to get Santosh to lose the competition, Santosh has to work hard for his love, eating red chilies and rice every day, even though he can't bear it. Through many antics from the Zamindar's side and Maya's side, Santosh eventually proves his love for Siri to Veera, and succeeds in growing more grains. However the Zamindar kidnaps Siri and then his son tries to rape her. A fight takes place in which Santosh kills the Zamindar's son. Veera, realizing that Santosh and Siri should be together, takes the blame for this and spends 5 years in prison. The movie ends with Veera's release from prison which is also when Siri and Santosh get married, in everyone's presence. Janaki then accepts Siri as her daughter-in-law.

== Cast ==
- Vishnuvardhan as Veera
- Aniruddh as Santosh
- Rakshita as Siri
- Ruthu as Lalitha "Lalli"
- Anant Nag as Santosh's father
- Chitra Shenoy as Santosh's mother
- Ramakrishna as Lalitha's father
- Komal as Gunda
- Ruchitha Prasad as Maya
- Rangayana Raghu as Jayaprakash
- Shivaram as police inspector
- Srinivasa Murthy as "Maashtru"
- Bank Janardhan as Lalitha's father-in-law
- B. Jaya as Subbamma "Subby"
- V. Ravichandran in a special appearance

== Soundtrack ==
Neenello Naanalle

Soundtrack album by Ramesh Krishna
- Released: June 2006
- Genre: Feature film soundtrack
- Length: 29:26
- Label: Arjun Music

Ramesh Krishna scored the film's background music and music for its soundtrack reusing all tunes from the original Telugu film, with its lyrics penned by K. Kalyan and Kaviraj. The soundtrack album consists of six tracks. It was released in the form of Compact Cassettes and CDs in June 2006 in Bangalore. All tunes were reused from original except "Sankranthi" while "Adhire Adhire" from the original is not featured.

=== Track listing ===
No.	Title	Lyrics	Singer(s)	Length
1.	"Akasha Bhumiya"	K. Kalyan	Rajesh Krishnan	5:26
2.	"Jeevanave Railu Payana"	Kaviraj	Hemanth Kumar	4:18
3.	"Nooraru Hrudayaglu"	K. Kalyan	Karthik, Sumangali	5:28
4.	"Onti Hakki"	Kaviraj	Rajesh Krishnan, Hemanth Kumar	3:41
5.	"Sankranthi"	Kaviraj	Shankar Mahadevan	5:27
6.	"Something"	Kaviraj	Tippu	5:06
Total length:				29:26

== Reception ==
A critic from Rediff.com wrote that "If you have not seen the Prabhu Deva directed Telugu film, Neenello Naanalle will be the perfect choice for a good viewing experience". A critic from Sify wrote that "On the whole, the film is packaged and presented well with enough masalas and is sure to grab your attention".
