= Madrasi (2006 film) =

- Poster
- Directed by: Arjun
- Written by: Arjun; G. K. Gopinath
- Produced by: Subha Sandeep
- Starring: Arjun; Jagapathi Babu; Vedhika; Gajala
- Cinematography: K. S. Selvaraj
- Edited by: P. Saisuresh
- Music by: D. Imman
- Production companies: Inspired Movies; Spice Team Entertainments
- Distributed by: Sree Ram Films International
- Release date: 17 February 2006
- Running time: 157 minutes
- Country: India
- Language: Tamil

Madrasi (transl. Man from Madras) (Note: Madrasi is also a slur used by people from North India to refer to people from South India, especially those from Tamil Nadu.) a 2006 Indian Tamil-language action film written and directed by Arjun. The film stars Arjun, Jagapathi Babu (in his Tamil debut), Vedhika (in her film debut) and Gajala with music composed by D. Imman. It was released on 17 February 2006. The film was partially reshot into Telugu as Sivakasi with Sunil and M. S. Narayana replacing Vivek and Vennira Aadai Moorthy respectively.

== Plot ==
Kaasi travels to Mumbai to track down his parents' killers, where he successfully finds and kills the first two, but the third manages to escape. In Dharma I, Ravi Bhai and Mani Bhai are the brothers and leading goons, but soon they become enemies and constantly try to kill each other. To locate the third killer, Kaasi joins Ravi Bhai's gang. However, Ravi is at odds with his brother Mani Bhai, who runs another gang, and the top goon is Siva. During an election, Siva rescues Mani Bhai from some goons while voting at a booth. Siva has a younger brother named Raghu, whom he takes to see a girl getting married. After a small complication, Siva ends up marrying the girl himself.

Kaasi falls in love with Anjali after fighting for her father, who was being harassed by goons. One day, Kaasi and Anjali go to a restaurant, where Siva and his wife are also present. Siva and Kaasi recognise each other from a previous meeting in prison, but they now work for rival gangs and become enemies. A builder approaches Ravi Bhai, claiming that his brother is threatening him for his share of a property. The builder asks for protection until he can leave for Singapore. Kaasi sees an opportunity to prove himself and arranges for protection, but to no avail and Mani Bhai kills the builder with Siva's help. Siva knew that the flight was delayed by an hour. Kaasi becomes upset, but Ravi Bhai comforts him.

After a scuffle in the restaurant, Kaasi and Siva's phones get swapped, and they both escape. Siva receives a call from Ravi Bhai on Kaasi's phone, asking him to store some weapons that they received from a party. Siva decides to use this opportunity to get revenge on Ravi Bhai and arranges for a man to steal the weapons and run from the police. The man leads the police to Ravi Bhai's godown, and they seize the weapons, but Kaasi makes the police leave after telling them that the godown belongs to someone else. Siva's wife calls and informs him of his brother's disappearance, where he looks for him. Siva beats the goons and Mani Bhai's son after finding out they were responsible for his brother's disappearance.

After an argument with Mani Bhai, Siva leaves his gang and meets Kaasi, asking him to protect his brother despite their differences. Kaasi agrees, but Ravi Bhai finds out and asks for the brother. Kaasi refuses, where he gets into an argument with Ravi Bhai and leaves his gang. Siva leaves his brother in Kaasi's custody. Now united and wanting to separate Siva and Kaasi, Ravi and Mani plan to kill Siva's brother by killing Anjali and diverting Kaasi. Siva's brother is killed, and Siva gets mad at Kaasi. After this, Siva and Kaasi become realises Ravi and Mani's plan, where they kill all the gangsters, including Ravi's son, Raja. However, Kaasi demands not to kill Raja and agrees to help him. Every gangster gets killed in the train engine. However, Kaasi gets fired by Mani, where Siva tries to kill Raja, but Kaasi shows a pistol to Siva. By seeing that Kaasi is injured by a bullet, Siva changes his mind and Kaasi dies.

== Cast ==
- Arjun as Kaasi
- Vedhika as Anjali
- Jagapathi Babu as Siva
- Gajala as Meenakshi
- Vivek as Pandi
- Vennira Aadai Moorthy
- Rajkapoor as Ravi Bhai
- FEFSI Vijayan as Mani Bhai
- Manish Borundia as Raja
- Periya Karuppu Thevar as Naidu
- Scissor Manohar as Mahabu Bhai
- O. A. K. Sundar as Kaasi's father
- Thalaivasal Vijay as Police Inspector
- Vinod Raj as Sundaramoorthy, Anjali's father
- Indu as Kaasi's mother
- Fish Venkat as Ravi Bhai's henchman
- Mohan Raj as Police Inspector
- Amit Tiwari
- Vajja Venkata Giridhar as Kaasi's friend

In the Tamil version, Sunil (who did Vivek's role in Telugu) uncredited appears alongside Vivek in the song "Adho Andha Paravai" and during the scene where he comes out shocked from the restroom and vice versa in Telugu. M. S. Narayana (who did Vennira Aadai Moorthy's role in Telugu) also uncredited appears alongside Vennira Aadai Moorthy in the same song in both versions.

== Production ==
Newcomer Vedhika was selected to make her debut as a lead actress after she was approached by Arjun's manager. Telugu actor Sunil also made his debut in Tamil in a minor role in the after the junior artist doing the part did not show up. A song sequence was filmed in London with over 150 dancers in the background, and a fight sequence involving Arjun and Jagapathi Babu was also shot in the same city. Plans to film in Mumbai were delayed due to floods, and later bomb blasts near the planned filming location. Arjun hoped the climactic fight sequence taking place on a train which travels at 50 km per hour would be a highlight.

== Soundtrack ==
The soundtrack is composed by D. Imman. It contains a remixed version of "Adho Andha Paravai" from Aayirathil Oruvan (1965).

Track listing
No.	Title	Lyrics	Singer(s)	Length
1.	"Adho Andha Paravai" (remix)	Kannadasan	D. Imman, Sunitha Sarathy
2.	"Kadhal Vaaram Kondata"	Pa. Vijay	Tippu, Ranjith, Suchitra
3.	"Oru Unmai Sollava"	Pa. Vijay	Karthik, Harini
4.	"Vidamatten Vidamatten"	Pa. Vijay	Karthik, Mahalakshmi Iyer
5.	"Yentha Ooro Yaro"	Palani Bharathi	Karthik, K. S. Chithra

== Reception ==
Malathi Rangarajan of The Hindu wrote, "You do understand Arjun's sincerity in trying out a different storyline within the restricted ambit of action, sentiment, romance and comedy. Yet after a point you can't help feeling that you've seen most of it many times before. However, Arjun's target audience may help the 'Madrasi' cruise comfortably." Cinesouth wrote, "‘Madrasi’ has misplaced both the director Arjun and actor Arjun".
