= Balaji (actor) =

Indian actor (2005-2009)

- Occupation: Actor
- Years active: 2005-2009
- Relatives: Ravichandran (brother)

Balaji is a former Indian actor who worked in Kannada-language films. He is the younger brother of V. Ravichandran.

== Career ==
Balaji was supposed to make his acting debut with the film College, which failed to take off. He made his debut with the romantic drama film Aham Premasmi (2005) directed, written, produced, composed and edited by his brother who also co-starred in the film as the God of Love. The film was released to positive reviews, and a critic opined that "Balaji proves that he is hero material in the song and fight sequences" whilst another opined that "Its better if Balaji be himself instead of trying to imitate his brother at times!" His next film was the action film Thunta (2005), which went through a change of cast and crew. The film was released to mixed reviews. One critic opined that "His lively performance is the saving point of the film".

After a four-year gap, his next film was Rajakumari (2009), which featured his brother in a guest role. The film also released to negative reviews with a critic writing that "Balaji lets all his fans down because his performance is not up to the mark. Though he did well in stunt sequences, he has to improve a lot in other departments". His last film was Iniya (2009) released to mixed-to-negative reviews with Balaji credited for carrying "the film on his shoulders with his brilliant acting and excellent dialogue delivery". After the box office failures of both of these films, Balaji decided to quit acting.

== Personal life ==
In 2002, Sushma Hirenath fell in love with him after he promised to make her a star. She consumed poison and subsequently died after she blamed him of not giving her film opportunities.

== Filmography ==
Year	Film	Role	Notes	Ref.
2005	Aham Premasmi	Eeshwar		
2005	Thunta	Gopalakrishna		
2009	Rajakumari	Balu alias Raja		
2009	Iniya	Balu		
