= Rajkumari (2009 film) =

- Film poster
- Directed by: S. Govindaraj
- Screenplay by: Ilakkiyan
- Story by: Raj Kapoor
- Based on: Anantha Poongatre (Tamil)
- Produced by: K. Manju
- Starring: Balaji; Kanika; Nikita Thukral; V. Ravichandran (Guest)
- Cinematography: Makarand Joshi
- Edited by: B. S. Kemparaj
- Music by: V. Harikrishna
- Production company: Lakshmishree Combines
- Release date: 6 March 2009
- Running time: 138 minutes
- Country: India
- Language: Kannada

Rajkumari is a 2009 Indian Kannada language drama film. directed by S. Govindraj and produced by K. Manju. The film stars Balaji, Kanika and Nikita Thukral in the lead roles, with V. Ravichandran in a guest appearance.

The film was a remake of Tamil film Anantha Poongatre (1999).

== Plot ==
Raj (Balaji) falls in love with Kumari (Kanika), a widow with a young child. Kumari's domineering father, a landlord (Srinivasamurthy), had previously killed her music teacher Ravi (Ravichandran) due to his disapproval of their close friendship. Furious, Kumari severs ties with her father. The story twists when Babbli (Nikhita), the daughter of a wealthy man (Avinash), develops feelings for Raj. To force a marriage between Raj and Babbli, her father orchestrates the kidnapping of Kumari's child. Blaming Raj for the disappearance, Kumari turns against him, leaving Raj torn between his love for her and the unfolding crisis.

== Cast ==
- Balaji as Balu alias Raja
- Kanika as Kumari
- Nikita Thukral as Bubbly
- Ramnitu Chaudhary
- Srinivasa Murthy as Zamindar
- Avinash
- Rangayana Raghu
- Sundar Raj
- Bullet Prakash
- M. S. Umesh
- V. Ravichandran as Music Teacher (guest appearance)

== Soundtrack ==
The music is composed by V. Harikrishna. Lyrics were written by V. Nagendra Prasad and K. Kalyan.

Track listing
No.	Songs	Singer(s)
1	Kuhoo Kuhoo	S. P. Balasubrahmanyam
2	Rangi Rangi	Karthik
3	Hey Baddi Magale	Tippu, Kalpana
4	24 Caret Bangara	Manikka Vinayagam, Shamitha Malnad
5	Chellidaro Malligeya	L. N. Shastry
6	Yaar Yaarammi	Srinivas

== Reception ==
A critic from The Times of India scored the film at 3 out of 5 stars and says "While Kanniha shines only in a few sequences, Nikhita needs to improve. Rangayana Raghu could have done a better job. Srinivasamurthy is very convincing and Sundararaj excels. V Harikrishna's music and excellent camerawork by M Joshi are the film's highlights". A critic from The New Indian Express wrote "The climax is how Kumari realises her mistake and join hands with Raj. It is worth watching if you have no other alternative to spend your time. The only saving grace of this film are the songs. Music director Harikirshna tried his best to compose tunes which rise above the movie". A critic from Bangalore Mirror wrote "Post interval, you will learn why Kumari is a widow with a child even though she is a virgin. Poor handling of the already insipid script makes for the perfect disaster that this movie is. At a time when some filmmakers have become fast enough to remake Tamil and Telugu films in Kannada even before the original is released, wonder why Govindu selected a story that has the inertia of old age".
