= Dum (2003 Tamil film) =

2003 film directed by A. Venkatesh

- Poster
- Directed by: A. Venkatesh
- Written by: Prasanna Kumar (dialogues)
- Story by: Puri Jagannadh
- Based on: Appu (Kannada)
- Produced by: Rockline Venkatesh
- Starring: Silambarasan; Rakshita; Ashish Vidyarthi
- Cinematography: Venkatesh Anguraj
- Edited by: V. T. Vijayan
- Music by: Deva
- Production company: Rockline Productions
- Release date: 14 April 2003
- Running time: 160 minutes
- Country: India
- Language: Tamil

Dum (/ðəm/ transl. Guts) is a 2003 Indian Tamil-language romantic action comedy film directed by A. Venkatesh. It is a remake of the 2002 Kannada film Appu. The film stars Silambarasan and Rakshita (in her Tamil debut, reprising her role from original) while Ashish Vidyarthi and S. S. Rajendran play pivotal roles. It was a box office success.

== Plot ==
Satya is the son of a police constable. He gets into fights and ends up in jail where his father gets him out on bail. While he is returning home from a party drunk, a group of college students beat him up. That is when Suchitra comes and takes him to the hospital and donates blood. She is the daughter of a police commissioner. Later, Satya falls in love with Suchitra. That leads to several problems which are faced bravely by Satya in the later part of the film. Finally, all goes well, and Satya also receives the letter confirming his selection for IPS.

== Cast ==
- Silambarasan as Sathya
- Rakshita as Suchitra
- Ashish Vidyarthi as Commissioner Thilak
- S. S. Rajendran as DGP Ramachandran
- Delhi Ganesh as Chokkalingam
- Livingston as Boopathi
- Radha Ravi as Inspector Ravikanth
- Sumitra as Sandhya
- Neelima Rani as Subha
- Besant Ravi as Chandra
- Madhan Bob as Kiran
- Cool Suresh as Vamshy
- Bayilvan Ranganathan as a police constable
- Karthik Sabesh as 'Ninety' Karthik
- Kottachi as Sathya's friend
- Scissor Manohar as a police constable
- Muthukaalai as a police constable
- Chelladurai as a police constable
- Kovai Senthil as a police constable
- Japan Kumar as Sathya's friend

== Production ==
The film was initially set to be titled Idiot after the Telugu version, but the title was later changed. A. Venkatesh remade the film from Puri Jagannadh's 2002 Kannada film Appu, which was also remade in Telugu in 2002 as Idiot. Venkatesh was keen to cast Kiran Rathod, but later selected Rakshita, who appeared in all three versions of the film. During the making of the film, Silambarasan did his own stunts including a risky jump from the fifth floor of a building. This was the first Tamil film to be produced by Rockline Venkatesh. The filming was held at Chennai and Bangalore while the songs were shot at Japan, China, Hong Kong, Bangkok and Thailand.

== Soundtrack ==
There are eight songs composed by Deva, while Sabesh–Murali handled the background score.

Song	Singers	Lyrics
"Adra Adra Dum"	Silambarasan, Sabesh	Silambarasan
"Chanakya Chanakya"	Sadhana Sargam	Pa. Vijay
"Kalakuven Kalakuven" I	Shankar Mahadevan	Vaali
"Kalakuven Kalakuven" II	Silambarasan	Vaali
"Kannamma Kannamma"	Udit Narayan, Anuradha Sriram	Kabilan
"Karuppo Sivappo"	Silambarasan	Pa. Vijay
"Manase Manase"	Hariharan	Pa. Vijay
"Polladha Padava"	Mahalakshmi Iyer, KK	Pa. Vijay

== Critical reception ==
Malathi Rangarajan of The Hindu wrote, "Making a marked deviation from the norm, the hero of Dhum remains unaffected by sentiment. So Simbhu's character is devoid of melodrama. A welcome change in the mindset of our heroes [...] A. Venkatesh's screenplay and direction leave no room for lull or lacuna at any point". Visual Dasan of Kalki wrote makers made masala by fooling fans without caring about logic while panning the lead hero's character design calling it wrong heroism and concluded saying it does not matter if cinema does not do good to the society, there is no need to do bad things like this. Malini Mannath of Chennai Online wrote that the film had "a racy screenplay, a fast-paced narration, non-stop action that leaves no room for lagging moments. All going to assure that 'Dum' makes for some compelling viewing for the youth and action lovers." Cinesouth wrote, "The spark in Simbu is reflected in the screenplay too. Though some scenes look incredulous, the pace of the film doesn't give you enough time to think. If you could bear Simbu's over-styling mannerisms and his digs at the police force, you might even enjoy the film". Sify wrote, "On the whole Dum is sure to entertain the masses, who do not think too hard".
