= Prem Adda =

2012 Kannada-language action film

- Promotional poster
- Directed by: Mahesh Babu
- Screenplay by: Mahesh Babu
- Story by: M. Sasikumar
- Based on: Subramaniapuram
- Produced by: Meka Murali Krishna
- Starring: Prem; Kriti Kharbanda
- Cinematography: Arun. D. Prasad
- Edited by: Srinivas. P. Babu
- Music by: V. Harikrishna
- Production company: Mekaa Pictures
- Distributed by: Jayanna Films
- Release date: 30 November 2012
- Running time: 158 minutes
- Country: India
- Language: Kannada

Prem Adda is a 2012 Indian Kannada-language action film. Prem, Meka Murali Krishna and Kriti Kharbanda play lead roles in the film. The film is directed by Mahesh Babu and the music is composed by V. Harikrishna. It is a remake of the 2008 Tamil film Subramaniapuram.

== Cast ==
- Prem as Ranganatha
- Meka Murali Krishna as Seena
- Shiva Manju
- Adda Ramesh
- Kriti Kharbanda as Girija
- Chandrakala Mohan
- Patre Nagaraj
- Nagarajamurthy as Somanna
- Sathyajith
- Murali Mohan
- Sharan Kabbur
- S. Govind
- Lakshmi Siddayya
- Kaddipudi chandru
- Dharma
- Raju Talikote
- Malvalli Saikrishna
- Aindrita Ray as item number
- Scarlett Mellish Wilson as item number

== Soundtrack ==
Prem Adda

Soundtrack album by V. Harikrishna
- Released: 2012
- Recorded: 2012
- Genre: Feature film soundtrack
- Length: 22:06
- Language: Kannada

Official audio
- Prem Adda - Full Album on YouTube

The soundtrack of the album was released on 19 September 2012. Prem Adda consists of six songs composed by V. Harikrishna. The song "Kangal Irandaal" from the original Tamil film was retained as "Kalli Ivalu". All the songs became hits.

No.	Title	Lyrics	Singer(s)	Length
1.	"Melkote Hudugi"	Malavalli Saikrishna	Kailash Kher, V. Harikrishna, Anuradha Bhat, Raju Thalikoti	04:48
2.	"Basanthi"	Yogaraj Bhat	V. Harikrishna, Priyadarshini	04:36
3.	"Baadigege"	Prem	Prem, Shreya Ghoshal	04:05
4.	"Adda Boys"	Tushar Ranganath	Shankar Mahadevan	04:00
5.	"Kalli Ivalu" (Set in Reethigowla)	V. Nagendra Prasad	Sonu Nigam, Shreya Ghoshal	05:17
Total length:				22:06

== Reception ==
=== Critical response ===
B. S. Srivani Deccan Herald wrote "Prem seems to enjoy his role while Kruti Kharbanda fills the eyes and heart. Coming close on the heels of Drama, Prem Adda passes by like a gust of wind full of dust". A critic from Bangalore Mirror wrote "The story has enough stuff to keep the audience engaged. Be warned of the violence that has earned it an ‘A’ certificate. The music by Harikrishna and the cinematography by Arun Prasad are top class. We must add, it is no match for the original". A critic from Daily News and Analysis wrote "Well, just that Prem Adda does the very thing that Subramaniapuram stays away from... making criminals look like heroes. The makers would have done better to retain the flavour and intention of the original. So watch it for the performance of the lead pair if you must". A critic from The Times of India scored the film at 2.5 out of 5 stars and says "While Prem shows some improvement in acting over his first movie Preethi Yeke Bhoomi Melide, it’s better he wears a director’s hat. Muralikrishna impresses. Kriti Kharbanda could have done much better. Lakshmi, a TV artiste, has done a good job as our hero’s aunt. Music by V Harikrishna has a couple of good numbers".

Srikanth Srinivasa from Rediff.com scored the film at 2.5 out of 5 stars and wrote "Debutant Arun D Prasad's cinematography is quite good; he is a good find. Mavalli Sai Krishna's dialogues are also quite apt. Mass Maada has shot the action sequences well although they are a bit gory. Prem Adda will entertain the masses who look for a rustic feel in films". A critic from India TV wrote " "Prem Adda" is watchable for its huge presentation but the violence in the film may not be liked by the family audience". A Sharadhaa from The New Indian Express wrote "Cinematographer Arund D Prasad has captured the village scenes very well. Harikrishna has once again won many hearts with his melodious and peppy numbers. Verdict: The film may not be that pleasant as the love flick eventually turns into a movie with a lot of bloodshed".
