= Toofan (2012 film) =

- Poster
- Directed by: Smile Seenu
- Written by: Smile Seenu
- Produced by: H. Jade Gowda
- Starring: Yashas; Nakshatra; Chandan
- Cinematography: Ravi Suvarna
- Music by: Elvin Josuha
- Production company: H J Gowda Production
- Release date: 20 April 2012
- Country: India
- Language: Kannada

Toofan is a 2012 Indian Kannada-language romantic drama film directed by Smile Seenu and starring Yashas, Nakshatra and Chandan.

== Cast ==
- Yashas as Surya
- Nakshatra as Raji
- Chandan as Akash
- Ramesh Bhat
- Shivaram
- Vidya Murthy
- Suresh Mangalore
- Devadas Kapikad
- Pramila Joshai
- Chitra Shenoy
- Sadhu Kokila

== Soundtrack ==
The soundtrack of the film was composed by Elvin Josuha.

Toofan

Soundtrack album by Elvin Josuha
- Released: 2012
- Recorded: 2012
- Genre: Feature film soundtrack
- Length: 26:21
- Language: Kannada
- Label: Anand Audio
External audio
- Toofan – Jukebox on YouTube

Track listing
No.	Title	Lyrics	Singer(s)	Length
1.	"Raagadante"	K. Kalyan	Karthik	4:42
2.	"Ellinda Banthu"	Jayanth Kaykini	Kunal Ganjawala, Sunitha Sarathy	4:22
3.	"Hoo Manave"	V. Nagendra Prasad	Vijay Prakash	4:58
4.	"Shiva Hudgire Hinga"	Kaviraj	Tippu, Anuradha Sriram	3:03
5.	"Thayige Magana"	V. Nagendra Prasad	S. P. Balasubrahmanyam, Archana Udupa	3:51
6.	"E Baalina Geleya"	Smile Seenu	Anuradha Bhat, Deepak Doddera	1:51
7.	"Ninna Hane Baarha"	Smile Seenu	Ajay Warrier, Anuradha Bhat	2:13
8.	"Nan Usire"	Smile Seenu	Deepak Doddera	1:21
Total length:				26:21

== Reception ==
A critic from The New Indian Express wrote that "Overall, the film fails to impress the audiences". A critic from The Times of India wrote that "Director Smile Seenu could have done a better job of the story by giving it a new-age angle that would have attracted Gen Y. The director fails in narrating a good story. Sudden change in sequences, and not-so-impressive editing and cinematography have further weakened the work". A critic from IANS wrote that "Toofan is a mediocre film made with little homework and seriousness. You can watch it only if you have no alternative". A critic from Bangalore Mirror wrote that "In some parts of the movie, there are some unimaginative scenes. What is lacking are good dialogue delivery and strong performances. It would not take a genius to guess the story as the film progresses".
