= Prem (director) =

Indian film director in Kannada cinema

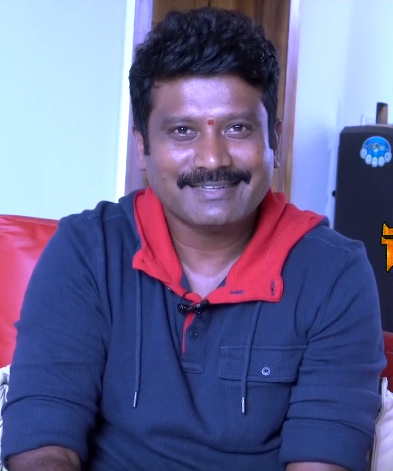
- Prem in October 2020
- Born: Kiran Kumar; 22 October 1976 (age 49); Maddur, Mandya, Karnataka, India
- Other name: Jogi Prem
- Occupations: Film director, actor, playback singer, lyricist, Film producer
- Years active: 1998–present
- Spouse: Rakshita (m. 2007)
- Children: 1
- Website: www.prempicttures.com

Kiran Kumar (born 22 October 1976), known by his screen name Prem, is an Indian film director in Kannada cinema.

== Personal life ==
Prem was born as Kiran Kumar on 22 October 1976 in Maddur, in the Mandya district of the Indian state of Karnataka, to Rajappa and Bhagyamma. He is married to actress-turned-producer Rakshita on March 9, 2007 and they have a son named Surya.

== Career ==
Prem started his career as assistant director on the film Nishkarsha (1993), working with Sunil Kumar Desai, while he was pursuing his pre-university course. Upon completion of the film, he returned to his hometown Mandya to complete the course before returning to Bangalore. He proceeded to work as an associate director with G. K. Mudduraj on Rayara Maga (1994) and Kannamuchchale; Dorai–Bhagavan; and with A. R. Babu on Hello Yama. Producer Anekal Balaraju offered him an opportunity to direct his first film Kariya (2003) independently.

Kariya was a gangster romance film starring Darshan in the lead. The film was critically acclaimed and appreciated by the audience. Prem was lauded for his casting of real life big dons to act in his movie. The soundtrack and cinematography were also widely appreciated. Darshan played a gangster struggling to express his love. The same year, Prem directed the light-hearted romantic film Excuse Me with Ajay Rao, Sunil Raoh, and Ramya in the lead roles. The film turned out to be a musical hit with many of its songs composed by R. P. Patnaik becoming chart busters.

In 2005, Prem came out with his biggest blockbuster film, Jogi, starring Shivarajkumar, Jennifer Kotwal, and Arundhati Nag in the lead roles. The film made record collections at the box-office. The mother-son sentiment theme was widely applauded and was considered as Shivarajkumar's biggest comeback film.

Following three back-to-back super hit films, Prem tried his hand at acting besides directing the film Ee Preethi Yeke Bhoomi Melide in 2008. The film's pre-release promotions received much media attention and expectations of the film were high. Bollywood actress Mallika Sherawat made her debut in South Indian films with a special appearance. The film was widely popular for its melodious soundtracks.

Prem next directed the film Raaj the Showman in 2010. It starred Puneeth Rajkumar and Priyanka Kothari. It is remembered mostly for its soundtrack by V. Harikrishna and cinematography. The movie was an average grosser at the box office despite the presence of the heavyweights Puneeth Rajkumar and V. Harikrishna.

Prem, for the first time without himself directing, accepted the lead role in the controversial film titled Prem Adda, a remake of the Tamil blockbuster hit Subramaniapuram with music by V. Harikrishna and directed by Mahesh Babu. The film made an average collection in box office. Under his production house Premdreams he produced and acted in the movie DK in 2014.

Prem's Ek Love Ya has been released. The movie stars debutant Raanna and is produced by Rakshita Prem.

His upcoming Pan Indian film, KD: The Devil, starring Dhruva Sarja, Sanjay Dutt, and Shilpa Shetty is slated for a release in 2025.

== Filmography ==
Key
| † | Denotes films that have not yet been released |

| Year | Film | Director | Actor | Singer | Lyricist |
|---|---|---|---|---|---|
| 1998 | Hello Yama | | Yes | | |
| 2003 | Kariya | Yes | | | |
| 2003 | Excuse Me | Yes | | Yes | Yes |
| 2005 | Jogi | Yes | | Yes | Yes |
| 2007 | Ee Preethi Yeke Bhoomi Melide | Yes | Yes | Yes | Yes |
| 2009 | Raaj the Showman | Yes | | Yes | Yes |
| 2011 | Jogayya | Yes | | Yes | Yes |
| 2012 | Prem Adda | | Yes | Yes | Yes |
| 2013 | Dasavala | | Yes | | |
| 2015 | DK | | Yes | Yes | Yes |
| 2018 | The Villain | Yes | | Yes | Yes |
| 2018 | Ambi Ning Vayassaytho | | | | Yes |
| 2022 | Ek Love Ya | Yes | | Yes | Yes |
| 2026 | KD: The Devil | Yes | | Yes | Yes |

== Discography ==
| Year | Song(s) | Film | Composer | Lyricist | Notes |
|---|---|---|---|---|---|
| 2003 | "Brahma Vishnu Shiva" | Excuse Me | R. P. Patnaik | V. Nagendra Prasad | Sang with chorus |
| 2003 | "Thottilu Thugolige" | Excuse Me | R. P. Patnaik | V. Nagendra Prasad | Co-sang with Madhukar |
| 2005 | "Beduvenu Varavannu" | Jogi | Gurukiran | Prem | Solo |
| 2005 | "Hodi Maga" | Jogi | Gurukiran | Prem | Co-sang with Gurukiran, Vijay Yesudas, and Gururaj Hoskote |
| 2007 | "Magalu Doddavaladalu" | Ee Preethi Yeke Bhoomi Melide | R. P. Patnaik | Prem | Co-sang with C. Ashwath and Kalpana |
| 2007 | "Ee Preethi Yeke" | Ee Preethi Yeke Bhoomi Melide | R. P. Patnaik | Prem | Solo |
| 2008 | "Nalle Nalle" | Marujanma | Sriimurali | Prem | Solo |
| 2009 | "Raajaa Heluvagella" | Raaj the Showman | V. Harikrishna | Kaviraj | Co-sang with Shreya Ghoshal |
| 2011 | "Odole" | Jogayya | V. Harikrishna | Prem | Co-sang with Shreya Ghoshal |
| 2012 | "Baadigege" | Prem Adda | V. Harikrishna | Prem | Co-sang with Shreya Ghoshal |
| 2013 | "Davva Davva" | Jataayu | Vinay Chandra | Kaviraj | Solo |
| 2014 | "Dooradondu" | Muddu Manase | Vineeth Raj Menon | Santhu | Solo |
| 2015 | "Sesamma" | DK | Arjun Janya | Prem | Co-sang with Mamta Sharma |
| 2015 | "Banda Banda" | DK | Arjun Janya | Sudarshan | Solo |
| 2016 | "Alemarriyaagi Aleyo Thirkai" | Half Mentlu | Bharath BJ | Lakshmi Dinesh | Solo |
| 2017 | "Ee Mannali" | Mass Leader | Veer Samarth | V. Nagendra Prasad | Co-sang with Chintan Vikas and Govind Kurnool |
| 2018 | "Marali Baradorige" | Parasanga | Harsha Vardhan Raj | N K Lolakshi | Solo |
| 2018 | "Tick Tick Tick" | The Villain | Arjun Janya | Prem | Co-sang with Kailash Kher, Vijay Prakash, and Siddharth Basrur |
| 2018 | "Love Aagoythe" | The Villain | Arjun Janya | Prem | Solo |
| 2018 | "Rana Rana Raavana" | The Villain | Arjun Janya | Prem | Co-sang with Shreya Ghoshal |
| 2019 | "Panchatantra" | Panchatantra | V. Harikrishna | Yogaraj Bhat | Solo |
| 2019 | "Amma Amma Ammaa" | Sinnga | Dharma Vish | V. Nagendra Prasad | Solo |
| 2020 | "Belakondu" | Naanu Matthu Gunda | Karthik Sharma | Rohith Raman | Solo |
| 2021 | "Helu Yaake" | Ek Love Ya | Arjun Janya | Prem | Solo |
| 2021 | "Edebaditha Joragide" | Ek Love Ya | Arjun Janya | Manjunath BS | Co-sang with Anuradha Bhat |
| 2022 | "O Ramayya" | Kandhidi Nodana | Sreedar Kashyap | Ravipoojar | Solo |
| 2022 | "Geleya Title Track" | Geleya | MS Thyagaraj | MS Thyagaraj | Solo |
| 2023 | "Amma Emba Hesare" | Parimala D'Souza | Christopher Jayson B | K. Kalyan | Solo |
| 2025 | "Siddayya Swamy Banni" | 45 | Arjun Janya | Kraanthi Kumar | Solo |
| 2026 | "Shiva Shiva" | KD: The Devil | Arjun Janya | Manjunath BS | Co-sang with Kailash Kher |
| 2026 | "Annthamma Jodetthu Kano" | KD: The Devil | Arjun Janya | Manjunath BS | Solo |
