= Abhimani (film) =

2009 Kannada-language film

- Directed by: Praveen Engineer
- Produced by: Utthanahalli Jayaram
- Starring: Rahul Salanke; Nidhi Subbaiah
- Cinematography: John Arnold
- Edited by: Malla Reddy
- Music by: Dharma Theja
- Release date: 29 May 2009
- Country: India
- Language: Kannada

Abhimani is a 2009 Indian Kannada-language film directed by Praveen Engineer starring Rahul Salanke and Nidhi Subbaiah in the lead roles.

== Cast ==
- Rahul Salanke as Muthu
- Nidhi Subbaiah as Arpana
- Sarath Babu as Ananthu
- Tara as Lakshmi
- Srinath
- Chithra Shenoy
- Rangayana Raghu
- Kunigal Nagabhushan
- Manjunath

== Music ==
Abhimani

Soundtrack album by Dharma Theja
- Released: 2009
- Recorded: 2009
- Genre: Feature film soundtrack
- Length: 24:47
- Language: Kannada

Official audio
- Abhimani - Full Album on YouTube

Track listing
No.	Title	Singer(s)	Length
1.	"Hangu Hingu"	Naveen, Reeta	4:24
2.	"Nannuru Nannusiru"	Rajesh Krishnan	3:40
3.	"Kaalayenuva"	Vijay Yesudas	4:07
4.	"Jagadalle"	S. P. Balasubrahmanyam	3:01
5.	"Antharalada"	Shankar Mahadevan	5:21
6.	"Korisuva"	Karthik	4:54
Total length:			24:47

== Reception ==
=== Critical response ===
R G Vijayasarathy of Rediff.com scored the film at 1.5 out of 5 stars and says "Rahul who starred in Nannusire needs to improve his expressions and dialogue delivery. Veteran actor Sharath Kumar overacts in a few sequences while Srinath, Tara and Chitra Shenoy are okay. All in all, Abhimaani is just an average fare". A critic from The New Indian Express wrote "Meanwhile, Muthu is diagnosed with cancer. The story then revolves around how he gets cured from the deadly disease and how he realises his mother’s dream. It is worth watching by whole family members". BS Srivani from Deccan Herald wrote "Tara is presented beautifully, so is model-turned-actress Nidhi. But for the comedy track and angry editing, ‘Abhimani’ would have been a better film". A critic from Bangalore Mirror wrote "But the real problem is with unnecessary comedy scenes that neither tickles you nor helps the story. There is also the unnecessary entry of goons to add a fight sequence to the narrative. If 30 minutes of these are removed, Abhimani is good enough for any film fan". A critic from The Times of India scored the film at 2 out of 5 stars wrote "Rahul could improve a bit. Srinath, Chithra Shenoy and Sharath Babu excel. Music by Dharmateja is okay. Less said the better about Nidhi".
