= Aham Premasmi =

- DVD cover
- Directed by: V. Ravichandran
- Written by: V. Ravichandran
- Produced by: V. Ravichandran
- Starring: Balaji; Aarti Chhabria
- Cinematography: G. S. V. Seetharam
- Edited by: V. Ravichandran
- Music by: V. Ravichandran
- Production company: Eeshwari Entertainments
- Release date: 27 May 2005
- Running time: 150 min
- Country: India
- Language: Kannada

Aham Premasmi ( transl. I am love) is a 2005 Indian Kannada-language romance film directed by V. Ravichandran. The film stars his brother Balaji and Aarti Chhabria. Besides acting, V. Ravichandran has written, produced, edited and composed music for the film. The film was released to positive reviews and underperformed at the box office.

== Cast ==
- Balaji as Eeshwar
- Aarti Chhabria as Apsara
- V. Ravichandran as the God of Love
- Sharan as Vignesh
- Ganesh as Ganesha
- Ramakrishna
- Chitra Shenoy
- Bullet Prakash
- Shankar Ashwath
- Sarigama Viji
- Mandya Ramesh
- Bank Janardhan
- Mandeep Roy

== Production ==
The film was launched in 2001 with the title Preethisona Baa but was changed after Ravichandran felt that such titles were overused and were similar to his previous films Preethsod Thappa and Ondagona Baa.

== Soundtrack ==
All the songs were composed, written and scored by V. Ravichandran. Ravichandran came up with a unique idea of selling the audio cassettes through cable operators and 50000 cassettes were said to have been sold within a day.

Sl No	Song title	Singer(s)
1	"Yadhaa Yadaahi"	L. N. Shastry
2	"College Teenage"	Suresh Peters, Gurukiran, Anupama
3	"Kannale"	Sonu Nigam, Sunidhi Chauhan
4	"Eeshwar"	S. P. Balasubrahmanyam, L. N. Shastry, Raju Ananthaswamy, Suma Shastry
5	"Condition"	Suresh Peters, Sunidhi Chauhan
6	"Pullinga Pullinga"	Hemanth, Anupama
7	"O Preethiye"	S. P. Balasubrahmanyam, Suma Shastry
8	"O Premave Na"	L. N. Shastry, Suma Shastry
9	"Praya Praya"	Rajesh Krishnan, Anuradha Sriram

== Marketing ==
Ravichandran came up with promotional strategy that viewers who answers questions about love and life would win the tickets of the film and the film's soundtrack.

== Reception ==
R. G. Vijayasarathy of Rediff.com wrote that "Aham Premasmi has turned out to be one of his [Ravichandran's] best films". S. N. Deepak of Deccan Herald wrote that "Aham Premasmi is totally a Ravichandran film. Right from screenplay to cinematography, songs to dialogues, Ravichandran has made his presence felt". A critic from Viggy wrote that "In a nutshell, Aham Premasmi marks the dream of a dreamer come true!" A critic from Indiaglitz wrote that "it is a Ravichandran film from A to Z and it is his craft that lingers in the mind of the viewers".

== Awards ==
- Udaya Film Award for Best Supporting Actor - V. Ravichandran
- Karnataka State Film Award for Best Art Direction - Ismail, Shivakumar
