= Mandya (film) =

- DVD cover
- Directed by: Om Prakash Rao
- Written by: Purushottam Rao
- Based on: Samba (Telugu)
- Produced by: Om Prakash Rao
- Starring: Darshan; Rakshita; Radhika
- Cinematography: Anaji Nagaraj
- Edited by: S. Manohar
- Music by: Gurukiran
- Production company: Thrisha Pictures
- Release date: 6 January 2006
- Running time: 161 minutes
- Country: India
- Language: Kannada

Mandya is a 2006 Indian Kannada-language action drama film produced and directed by Om Prakash Rao and written by Purushottam Rao. The film stars Darshan, Radhika and Rakshita in the lead roles. The film is a remake of Telugu film Samba (2004).

== Cast ==
- Darshan as Ganesh alias Eshwar
- Rakshita as Parvathi
- Radhika Kumaraswamy as Ganga
- Swasthik Shankar as Eshwar's uncle
- Dharma as Bhadrayya
- Ravi Chetan as Chetu
- Lakshman as Parvathi's father
- Siddharth as Bhadrayya's aide
- G. V. Sudhakar Naidu as Bhadrayya's aide
- Harish Rai as Jaggu
- Sathyajith as Bhadrayya's aide
- Diganth as Harsha
- Sadhu Kokila as Subramanya
- Anantha Velu as Dhanraj
- Shobaraj as Cylinder Seena
- Siddaraju Kalyankar as Siddanna
- Kirloskar Sathya as Dharmanna
- Sudharani as Gayatri
- Chitra Shenoy as Bhadrayya's wife
- Malathi Sardeshpande
- Shailaja Joshi
- Pushpa Swamy as mother of Priya's stalker
- Avinash as Bhoopayya
- Ashwath Narayan
- R. G. Vijayasarathy as father of Priya's stalker
- Karibasavaiah as Halappa
- Baby Raksha as young Gayatri

== Soundtrack ==
The music of the film was composed by Gurukiran.

Mandya

Soundtrack album by Gurukiran
- Released: 2006
- Genre: Feature film soundtrack
- Label: Anand Audio

No.	Title	Singer(s)	Length
1.	"Moriya Oh Bappa"	Rajesh Krishnan
2.	"Sundara"	Anupama, Timmy
3.	"Ko Ko Ko Koli"	Gurukiran, Anuradha Sriram
4.	"Muttidare Yaako"	Gurukiran, Shamitha Malnad, Malathi
5.	"Eshwar"	Gurukiran

== Reception ==
A critic from The Hindu wrote that "But in Mandya, he [Om Prakash Rao] staggers continuously and loses grip of the storyline. Thus he remains a stranger to both what he wants to convey and what he conveys". A critic from Rediff.com wrote that the film "fails to generate interest among the viewers because of a weak script". Sify called it "strictly for Darshan fans". Echoing the same, a critic from Chitraloka.com wrote that "the film is stitched for Darshan fans".
