= Rahul Salanke =

Indian film actor

- Born: 14 May 1986 (age 40); Bangalore, Karnataka, India
- Education: Jain University, Bengaluru
- Occupation: Actor
- Years active: 2008–present

Rahul Salanke, popularly known as RK Rahul is an Indian actor, primarily from Kannada cinema.

He made his acting debut in Nannusire in 2008. He is best known for his performance in the Kannada movie Jigarthanda produced by Kannada cinema actor Sudeep's company - Kichcha Creations. He is also known for his performance as a VJ and television host for 'Ondu Prashne Ondu Haadu' TV show on Udaya Music.

He is an opening batsman for Karnataka Bulldozers in the Celebrity Cricket League (CCL).

== Personal life ==
Rahul Salanke was born on 14 May 1986 in Bangalore, Karnataka. He completed his schooling from St. Joseph's Indian High School, Bangalore and Bachelor's degree in Commerce from Sri Bhagawan Mahaveer Jain College, Bangalore. Rahul obtained his MBA degree from Symbiosis International University.

== Career ==
Rahul is the first actor to be launched by Sudeep as a main lead in his home production.

His movie Jigarthanda (2016) has been his most successful movie to date. Directed by Shiva Ganesh, the film was a remake of the Tamil film Jigarthanda (2014), featuring actor Siddharth.

== Filmography ==
Year	Film	Role	Notes	Ref
2008	Nannusire	Abhishek		
2009	Abhimani	Muthu		
2009	Chamkaisi Chindi Udaysi	Ramu		
2010	Hrudayadali Idenidu	Sanjay		
2014	Maanikya	Yogi	Cameo appearance	
2016	Jigarthanda	Rahul	Remake of Jigarthanda, inspired by A Dirty Carnival	
