= Jogayya =

- Theatrical release poster
- Directed by: Prem
- Written by: Prem
- Produced by: Rakshita Prem
- Starring: Shiva Rajkumar; Sumit Kaur Atwal
- Cinematography: Nanda Kumar
- Edited by: Srinivas P. Babu
- Music by: V. Harikrishna
- Production company: Prem's Pictures
- Release date: 19 August 2011
- Running time: 170 minutes
- Country: India
- Language: Kannada
- Box office: ₹8 crore

Jogayya is a 2011 Indian Kannada-language action drama film directed by Prem and produced by Rakshita Prem under Prem's Pictures. The film stars Shiva Rajkumar in the titular role (in his 102nd film), alongside Sumit Kaur Atwal, Pooja Gandhi, Ravishankar Gowda. It is the sequel to the 2005 film Jogi. The music was composed by V. Harikrishna, while cinematography and editing were handled by Nanda Kumar and Srinivas P. Babu.

Jogayya was released on 19 August 2011 in 250 theaters across Karnataka.

== Plot ==
In Bangalore, the cops torture Jogi's accomplices to reveal Jogi's location, which leads them to a conclusion that Jogi has moved to Dubai. Upon release, Jogi's accomplices meet Bhubaiyya and verbally abuse Jogi for his betrayal.

Jogi, in reality, resides in Mumbai as Mahadeva and works as a servant in Vidya's house. Vidya's marriage is fixed with an astrologer from Karnataka, who seems to vaguely recognise Jogi. This causes him to remember the events which caused him to leave Bangalore. After his mother's death, (Note: As depicted in Jogi.) Jogi continued to live as a goon, but changed his mind after getting humiliated by a doctor and mocked by his friends. Knowing that entering into the crime world would not provide him another chance, Jogi left the city without informing anyone.

Jogi decides to leave Mumbai as he is troubled by the presence of Vidya's fiancé. Jogi's fellow mates in Mumbai kills a gangster, who had destroyed their lives and secretly moves to a coastal region from where they plan to leave for Dubai. Jogi, who spots them at the beach joins them. Before leaving the coast, they are cornered by the cops, who arrest Jogi and take him back to Bangalore. While taking him to court, Jogi finds that Bhubaiyya has been killed in an accident. This shatters him. While at the court, Jogi learns that several people are awaiting his death, where he is puzzled and equally heartbroken. Vidya, who has fallen for Jogi, calls off her wedding and learns from her fiancée that Jogi will die in six months. Vidya moves to Karnataka to save him.

Vidya seeks help from an advocate, who manages to prove Jogi's innocence. Once released from the prison, Jogi assembles his former gang and resumes his illegal activities. After escaping an attempt on his life, Jogi meets an aged person, who has a clear explanation regarding Jogi's earlier predicament. When Jogi left the crime world, Naidu and the crime syndicate decided to meet a new gangster, who will allow them to resume their activities. Appanna volunteered to help them and spread terror and killed innocent people, where he made Jogi as a scapegoat. Sensing the danger, the aged person searched for Jogi and eventually found him in Mumbai. With the help of police commissioner, the old man managed to bring back Jogi. Bhubaiyya was also killed by Appanna.

These revelations startle Jogi, who finishes the syndicate leaders and goes in search of Appanna. Jogi solves the people's problems thereby gaining their support and also receives a new title of Jogayya. Having enough of the gang wars, the CM asks the officials to prepare a list and encounter the goons. Appanna's mother seeks Jogi's help to save her son. In spite of having a burning desire to kill Appanna for destroying his life, Jogi decides to help the mother. However, Appanna is killed by the cops. Jogi kills Naidu's brothers using a police gun, who backs the government. An enraged Naidu withdraws his support given to the government resulting in the party losing majority and conduction of elections.

Jogi decides to stand as a candidate, but is met by Vidya's father and reveals about Vidya's love for him. Jogi searches for Vidya, only to be betrayed and brutally hacked by his Mumbai friends. Jogi survives and the persons, who hacked Jogi, are murdered by Jogi's accomplices. Jogi meetd the people, who gathered around to see him. It is revealed that the idea of killing Naidu's brothers and the mafia leaders were given by the common men, who were inspired by Jogi's good deeds. Jogi reconsider his decision to contest in election and reunites with Vidya. The people, inspired by Jogi's speech, swears to elect only those candidates who are eligible and capable.

== Cast ==
- Shiva Rajkumar as Madesha (Mahadeva) alias Jogi
- Sumit Kaur Atwal as Vidya Gokhale
- Pooja Gandhi as an advocate
- Ravishankar Gowda
- Narasimha Joshi
- Vijay Anand
- Umesh Punga
- John
- Mass Madha
- Shankar
- B. Ganapathi
- Gururaj Hosakote
- Narendra Babu
- Nanda Kumar
- Prakash Shenoy
- Aravind Rao
- Suresh Mangalore

== Production ==
Jogayya was launched on 12 July 2010 in an event attended by Ambareesh, Chiranjeevi, Vijay and Suriya. The songs have been lavishly picturized and it is reported that the song shooting of Odale has cost Prem ₹1.5 crore. In Haridwar, 300 sadhus (saints) were used for shooting this song which uses 3D technology. The film has been shot in Bangalore, Mysore, Mumbai, Haridwar, Hrishikesh and other holy places of North India.

== Release ==
Due to the success of the film Jogi in 2005, there has been a tremendous interest generated for Jogayya in 2011. Although the film was scheduled to be released on 19 August, tickets of first three days were issued one week in advance. Within a few hours after initiating booking, all 3 days' tickets were sold out in the BKT region (Bengaluru, Kolar and Tumkur) of Karnataka. Black tickets being sold at exorbitant rates of up to ₹3,000 per ticket was reported. The movie has started seeing empty halls since the eighth week and has subsequently been replaced. The film received mixed reviews from critics and completed 50 days at the box office.

== Reception ==
=== Critical response ===
The Times of India gave 4/5 stars and wrote "Director Prem has aptly selected a story that showcases Shiva Rajkumar’s true talent in his 100th movie." Shruti Indira Lakshminarayana of Rediff gave 2/5 stars and wrote that the prequel was undoubtedly better than the sequel. A critic from The New Indian Express wrote "Jogayya can be watched only for Shivaraj Kumar's excellent performance in his 100th film". B S Srivani of Deccan Herald wrote "The overall effect of the film is of pixels all beautiful in their own right, but unable to make a meaningful montage. Or perhaps, is it a case of expecting too much?". News18 criticized its hotpotch narration and sequences, but praised its technical aspects and Shiva Rajkumar's performance.

== Soundtrack ==
The film's music album was released on 19 May 2011. Jogayya has eight songs (including a theme) composed by V. Harikrishna and Ashwini Recording Company has bought the music rights of the film. More than 100,000 CDs and cassettes were sold within 5 days of music release, which is a record in Kannada Film Industry. Over 60,000 records were sold on the first day of market launch.

All lyrics are written by Prem.

No.	Title	Singer(s)	Length
1.	"Kuri Kolinaa"	Kailash Kher, Shreya Ghoshal, Vijay Prakash	4:50
2.	"Gangeye Avana"	Shankar Mahadevan	4:45
3.	"Kempegowdruralli"	Upendra, Priya Himesh	4:37
4.	"Jogaiah Baa"	Shreya Ghoshal	1:57
5.	"Yaru Kaanadooru"	Sonu Nigam, Shreya Ghoshal	5:22
6.	"Hetthavalalla Avalu"	Sonu Nigam	1:58
7.	"Odole"	Prem, Shreya Ghoshal	4:27
8.	"Mother Theme (Instrumental)"	V. Harikrishna	1:39
