= Billa Ranga Baasha =

Upcoming Kannada film by Anup Bhandari

- First-look poster
- Directed by: Anup Bhandari
- Written by: Anup Bhandari
- Produced by: K. Niranjan Reddy; Chaitanya Reddy
- Starring: Sudeepa
- Production company: Primeshow Entertainment
- Country: India
- Language: Kannada

Billa Ranga Baasha (abbreviated as BRB) is an upcoming Indian Kannada-language science fiction action film written and directed by Anup Bhandari, starring Sudeepa. The film is produced by K. Niranjan Reddy and Chaitanya Reddy under Primeshow Entertainment. The film is set in a post-apocalyptic world in 2209 AD.

== Cast ==
- Sudeepa
- Nayanthara
- Jisshu Sengupta

== Production ==
=== Development ===
The film was announced in December 2018 as a collaboration between actor Sudeep and director Anup Bhandari. The project was subsequently delayed during development. Bhandari later directed Vikrant Rona (2022), which starred Sudeep.

In September 2024, the project was announced with concept material, with Primeshow Entertainment attached as the production company. K. Niranjan Reddy and Chaitanya Reddy were announced as producers.

=== Filming ===
Principal photography began in April 2025. The initial schedule lasted 20 days before production was paused.

In June 2026, Sudeep announced that production would resume later that month. Filming resumed on 26 June 2026.
