= Kashi from Village =

- VCD cover
- Directed by: Om Sai Prakash
- Screenplay by: Mohammed Ghouse; Om Sai Prakash
- Based on: Bagavathi (Tamil) by A. Venkatesh
- Produced by: N. Kumar
- Starring: Sudeepa; Rakshita
- Cinematography: J. G. Krishna
- Edited by: Rajashekhar Reddy
- Music by: Koti
- Production company: Sri Lakshmi Films
- Release date: 1 April 2005
- Country: India
- Language: Kannada

Kashi from Village (also known as Kashi) is a 2005 Indian Kannada-language action film directed by Om Sai Prakash, starring Sudeepa and Rakshita. The film features background score and soundtrack composed by Koti and lyrics by K. Kalyan. The film was released on 1 April 2005. It is a remake of the Tamil film Bagavathi (2002).

== Plot ==
Kashi owns a tea shop and lives with his younger brother Vishwa. Kashi's lifelong dream is to make his brother a doctor according to the promise he made to his mother before her death. He meets a girl named Anjali. She ends up appreciating his kindness, and they fall in love. Vishwa has a girlfriend named Priya, with whom he secretly develops an intimate relationship. However, Vishwa and Priya's relationship is objected to by Priya's father PVR, a business magnate. Kashi tries to convince PVR, but the former is humiliated by the latter. Vishwa and Priya elope and plan to marry. After knowing about this, PVR's brother Satya and his nephew Hari kill Vishwa on the way to their wedding and take Priya away with them. Kashi gets devastated by seeing Vishwa brutally murdered.

Kashi mourns over Vishwa's death, and promises he will be with his brother forever in his last moment. After Vishwa's death, Kashi learns that Priya is pregnant with Vishwa's child and becomes happy that Vishwa will be coming back as his nephew. However, PVR attempts to kill the child before birth, but Kashi challenges him, saying the child will touch the earth. In order to accomplish Kashi's vengeance, Chamak lal Settu, PVR's enemy helps him turn into a gangster. With the help of Anjali, Kashi overcomes all hurdles put forth by PVR and manages to protect Priya to allow for the safe birth of his brother's child. PVR later realizes his mistake and apologizes to Kashi.

== Cast ==
- Sudeep as Kashi
- Rakshita as Anjali
- Satya Prakash as PVR, a business tycoon cum don
- Harsha as Vishwa, Kashi's brother
- Dharma as Satya, PVR's younger brother
- Sundar Raj as Chamal Lal
- Harish Rai as Hari, PVR's nephew
- Bank Janardhan as Anjali's relative
- Sara Shivakumar as Priya

== Soundtrack ==
Music by Koti. All lyrics were written by K. Kalyan. The song "Maguve Naguthiru" is a remake of composer's own Telugu song "Kadile Kalama" from Pedarayudu. "Happy Birthday" is based on "O Navvu Chalu" from Nuvvu Naaku Nachav. and also based on "Aha en parkal" from Vaseegara.

Track listing
No.	Title	Singer(s)	Length
1.	"Happy Happy Birthday"	Rajesh Krishnan, Mano	4:50
2.	"Nooraru Kaala"	Rajesh Krishnan	1:15
3.	"Maguve Nagutiru"	K. J. Yesudas	4:50
4.	"Ye Kicchha Kicchha"	Udit Narayan, K. S. Chithra	5:02
5.	"Andhave Andhave"	Rajesh Krishnan, Lakshmi	4:35
6.	"Goli Maaro"	Udit Narayan, K. S. Chithra	4:31
7.	"One Two Three"	Mano	6:00

== Reception ==
R. G. Vijayasarathy from Rediff.com wrote that "Kashi will provide some relief for the audience looking for decently made commercial films, though too much sensibility is not to be looked for in such films". A critic from Sify wrote that "If you are a Sudeep fan go ahead and watch it".
