= Iniya (film) =

2009 Kannada film

Iniya (ಇನಿಯ)
- Directed by: Mahesh
- Produced by: Shailendra Babu
- Starring: Balaji; Pooja Gandhi
- Cinematography: Sundarnath Suvarna
- Edited by: Mohan V Kamakshi
- Music by: V. Sridhar
- Release date: 28 August 2009
- Country: India
- Language: Kannada

Iniya (Kannada: ಇನಿಯ) is a 2009 Indian Kannada-language romantic family drama film directed by Mahesh, starring Balaji and Pooja Gandhi.

== Plot ==
The tale begins with Balu who is part of a big joint family and as expected, the head of the family is quite strict. His life takes a turn when Janaki enters his home as Balu's cousin is getting married. The pretty Janaki is always noisy, bubbly and has the habit of chatting away. In no time, Balu and Janaki tend to cross swords and their hatred for each other soon draws them closer and they fall in love. However, in one instance, Balu saves Janaki from the hands of goons when he goes to the city. But then, a case is filed against him and he lands up in jail. When he comes out, he discovers that Janaki has already got married.

== Cast ==
- Balaji as Balu
- Pooja Gandhi as Janaki
- Urvashi
- Loknath
- Jai Jagadish
- Sanketh Kashi
- Ramesh Bhat
- Lambu Nagesh
- Chitra Shenoy
- Vaijanath Biradar
- Shille Manjunath
- Vybhav M

== Music ==
Iniya

Soundtrack album by V Sridhar
- Released: 2009
- Recorded: 2009
- Genre: Feature film soundtrack
- Length: 26:04
- Language: Kannada

Official audio
- Iniya - Full Album on YouTube

Track listing
No.	Title	Singer(s)	Length
1.	"Yaarannu Jariyadiru Thamma"	Kunal Ganjawala	5:12
2.	"Hello Hello Missamma"	Udit Narayan, Chaitra H. G.	3:51
3.	"Muddada Ee Naguvige"	Sonu Nigam, Nanditha	4:35
4.	"Hode Doora Nee Yaake"	Mangala Ravi, Bhutto, V Sridhar	5:05
5.	"Yaarigyaaru Illa Swarthavene Ella"	V Sridhar, Nanditha	5:23
6.	"Iniya Iniya Iniya Neenene Nan Iniya"	Karthik, Anuradha Bhat	3:14
Total length:			26:04

== Reception ==
=== Critical response ===
R. G. Vijayasarathy of Rediff.com scored the film at 2 out of 5 stars and wrote "Music by Sreedhar is above average. Compositions like Yaarannu, Mudhdhaadha I Naguvige shine. Sundaranatha Suvarna's camera work is good too. Overall Iniya is worth a watch". Bangalore Mirror wrote "The film is overly dramatic in most parts and neither Balaji or Pooja Gandhi help to stem the rot. The formula of a comedy scene followed by a song followed by a fight with yawning gaps within scenes makes Iniya a dull watch". The Times of India scored the film at 3 out of 5 stars and wrote "Hats off to Balaji, who carries the film on his shoulders with his brilliant acting and excellent dialogue delivery, especially in the climax. Pooja Gandhi is okay but only at the end. V Shridhar's music is a treat to the ears, and Sundaranatha Suvarna's camerawork is a feast for the eyes". The New Indian Express wrote "Sreedhar's music is good. The title song and "Muddaada Ee Naguvige" have been shot well. The background score gels with the narrative. Veteran Sundaranath Suvarna shows his competence in handling the camera. "Iniya" is good in parts. It shines because of a very strong performance from Balaji".
