= Hubballi (film) =

2006 film by Om Prakash Rao

- Film poster
- Directed by: Om Prakash Rao
- Produced by: Om Prakash Rao; Shankar Gowda
- Starring: Sudeepa; Rakshita
- Cinematography: K. M. Vishnuvardhan
- Edited by: R. Janardhan
- Music by: A. R. Hemanth
- Release date: 10 November 2006
- Running time: 169 min
- Country: India
- Language: Kannada

Hubballi is a 2006 Kannada-language action thriller film directed by Om Prakash Rao starring Sudeepa and Rakshita. Released on 10 November 2006, it features a background score and soundtrack composed by A. R. Hemanth and lyrics by Da Ra Bendre, K. Kalyan and Padma Hemanth. Sai Entertainment dubbed the film into Hindi as Vardee Tujhe Salaam in 2008.

== Plot ==
Major Chandrakanth (Ananthavelu) found a man lying by the road while jogging and admitted him to the hospital. It happens to be Sudeep. Sudeep recovers from his injuries and starts to find about himself with the help of Major's daughter Priya (Rakshitha). A stranger notices him and shouts, "Are you still alive?" Sudeep chases him to find out what he means by it, but he escapes to Basappa Ullagaddi (Swasthik Shankar) and tells him about it.

Police arrest Sudeep and Priya to question them. A police officer comes to the station and notices him, surprisingly salutes him. Sudeep is Ajay Kumar Sarnayak. Ajay Kumar regains his memory.

In the flashback, Ajay Kumar Sarnayak, an honest ACP, fights crime. He arrests Basappa Ullagaddi and his companions for smuggling and extortion. Ajay's sister marries Ullagaddi's son. One day they poisoned him and killed his sister. He is saved by Major Chandrakant.

Ajay, regaining his memory, returns to his home and, acting as if he has forgotten everything, plots revenge on Basappa Ullagaddi. On his mother's request, he takes his sister's baby. Ajay plots a kidnapping drama and kills Basappa Ullagaddi and his all companions.

== Cast ==
- Sudeep as ACP Ajay Kumar Sarnayak, Assistant Commissioner of Police
- Rakshita as Priya
- Ananthavelu as Major Chandrakanth (Priya's father)
- Srinivas Prabhu as Dr. Ramakrishna
- Swasthik Shankar as Bandappa Basavappa Ullagadi Bhatt
- Sadhu Kokila as Anna, a local rowdy
- Bullet Prakash as Anna's henchman
- Thimme Gowda
- Ravi Chetan as Basavappa Ullagadi's son
- Dharma as Raghu, Basavappa Ullagadi's son & Ajay Kumar's brother in law
- Shankar Gowda as Basavappa Ullagadi's Elder son
- Chithra Shenoy as Ajay Kumar's mother
- Tennis Krishna
- Vijaya Sarathi
- Mandeep Roy as Police constable
- Vaijanath Biradar as police constable
- Tharakesh Patel as Susheel, Ajay Kumar's subordinate
- Shobhraj as Kotari, weapon dealer
- Dharanendrayya
- Lohithaswa as DGP of Police
- Lakshman Rao as IG
- Badri Narayan
- Killer Venkatesh as Ullagadi's brother
- G. K. Govinda Rao
- Shankar Bhat
- Mallesh Gowda
- Rajashekhar Kotian
- Amarnath Aaradhya
- M. N. Lakshmi Devi
- Shailaja Joshi
- Megha Bhagavatar
- Padmini
- Hubli Manjula
- Sangeetha Shetty

== Production ==
The film's muhurat took place on 7 December 2005 with actor Darshan did the clap for the first shot. Hubballi marks the third collaboration of Sudeep with Om Prakash Rao after Huchcha and Partha. This film's opening scene where Sudeepa acting as a completely memory loss man, is loosely adapted from Tamil movie Ghajini (2005). Most of the scenes were borrowed from Tamil movie Vallarasu (2000) including the half climax in which Sudeepa kills his brother-in-law.

== Soundtrack ==
Soundtrack was composed by A. R. Hemanth.

Hubballi

Soundtrack album by A. R. Hemanth
- Released: 10 September 2006
- Genre: Feature film soundtrack
- Length: 32:56
- Language: Kannada
- Label: Anand Audio
- Producer: A.R Hemanth

No.	Title	Lyrics	Singer(s)	Length
1.	"Innu Yaka Baralillava"		Shamitha Malnad, Adarsh Aditya
2.	"Saaniya O Saaniya"		Nanditha, Badri Prasad
3.	"Pallaki Myala"		Rajesh Krishnan, Spipriya
4.	"Salamya Smile"		Chaitra H. G.
5.	"Ninna Manssigendu"	K. Kalyan	Nanditha, Kunal Ganjawala
6.	"Kannada Nadina"		Shankar Mahadevan

== Reception ==
RG Vijayasarathy of Rediff.com scored the film at 2.5 out of 5 stars and says "Hubballi is enjoyable only for Sudeep's performance and Rakshitha's comedy timing, but it requires a lot of patience to sit through the lengthy stunts and melodrama in the second half".

== Home media ==
The film is available on Sun NXT.
