= Nandhi (2002 film) =

- Directed by: D. Rajendra Babu
- Screenplay by: D. Rajendra Babu
- Story by: M.K. Maheshwaran
- Produced by: B.V. Chakrapani; C. Gopi; M. Kumar; N. Dileep Kumar; M.T. Sriram
- Starring: Sudeep; Sindhu Menon; Radhika Chaudhari
- Cinematography: Chandru
- Edited by: T. Shashikumar
- Music by: Gurukiran
- Release date: 27 December 2002
- Running time: 125 min
- Country: India
- Language: Kannada

Nandhi is a 2002 Kannada-language action-drama film directed by D. Rajendra Babu featuring Sudeep, Sindhu Menon and Radhika Chaudhari in the lead roles. The film features background score and soundtrack composed by Gurukiran and lyrics by Kaviraj and V. Nagendra Prasad. The film released on 27 December 2002.

== Plot ==
Nandhi (Sudeep), a young man who comes from Prison comes to join in Law College. He was sentenced to jail for accidentally murdering his schoolmate in his childhood.

== Cast ==
- Sudeep as Nandhi
- Sindhu Menon as Divya
- Radhika Chaudhari as Pinki
- Ashish Vidhyarthi as Dhanraj/Different Danny
- Ambika as Nandhi's mother
- Kashi as Professor
- Vikas as Nandhi's friend
- Vaijanath Biradar as Bagni
- Shankar Ashwath as Police Officer
- Chikka Suresh
- Narendra Babu Sharma
- Dileep as Landlord

== Soundtrack ==
The soundtrack was composed by Gurukiran collaborating with Sudeep for the third time after Chandu (2002) and Dhumm (2002). Lyrics were written by V. Nagendra Prasad and Kaviraj. The soundtrack was released by Ashwini audio.

Nandhi

Soundtrack album by Gurukiran
- Released: 24 December 2002
- Recorded: Ashwini Recording Company
- Genre: Feature film soundtrack
- Length: 28:32
- Language: Kannada
- Label: Ashwini Audio
- Producer: Gurukiran

Gurukiran chronology
Hollywood (2002)	Nandhi (2002)	Kariya (2003)
External audio
- Official Audio Jukebox on YouTube

No.	Title	Lyrics	Singer(s)	Length
1.	"Kadala Daati Banda"	V. Nagendra Prasad	Udit Narayan
2.	"Nakara Gikara"	V. Nagendra Prasad	Shankar Mahadevan
3.	"Don't Go"	Kaviraj	Gurukiran, Hemanth Kumar
4.	"Ageu Bandaga"	V. Nagendra Prasad	Malgudi Subha
5.	"Kadala Daati Banda"	V. Nagendra Prasad	Gurukiran
6.	"Ondanondu kaaladali"	V. Nagendra Prasad	K. S. Chithra

== Reception ==
A critic from Viggy wrote that "Film Nandi is an out and out Sudeep film".

== Awards ==
Awards and nominations
Award	Wins	Nominations
Filmfare Awards South	1	N/A
Karnataka State Film Awards	1	0
- Totals
Awards won	2
Nominations	N/A

Filmfare Awards South

- Best Actor - Kannada (2002) - Sudeep

Karnataka State Film Awards

- Best Actor (2002) - Sudeep
