= Jigarthanda (2016 film) =

- Directed by: Shiva Ganesh
- Story by: Karthik Subbaraj
- Based on: Jigarthanda by Karthik Subbaraj
- Produced by: Sudeepa; S. Sathyanarayana
- Starring: Rahul; Samyukta Hornad; P. Ravishankar
- Cinematography: Jai Anand
- Edited by: S. Devaraj
- Music by: Arjun Janya
- Production companies: Kichcha Creations, SRV Productions
- Distributed by: Mysore Talkies
- Release date: 24 June 2016
- Country: India
- Language: Kannada

Jigarthanda (transl. Cold-hearted) is a 2016 Indian Kannada-language action comedy film directed by Shiva Ganesh, written by Karthik Subbaraj and produced by Kichcha Creations and SRV Productions. It is a remake of Subbaraj's 2014 Tamil film of same name which itself was inspired by the 2006 South Korean movie A Dirty Carnival. It stars Rahul Salanke and Samyukta Hornad along with P. Ravi Shankar, Chikkanna, Dharma, K. Manju, Guruprasad, Sadhu Kokila and Veena Sundar in supporting roles. Arjun Janya composed the film's score and soundtrack. It was released on 24 June 2016.

== Cast ==
- Rahul Salanke as Rahul, an aspiring film director
- P. Ravi Shankar as Assault Arumuga, a dreaded gangster
- Samyukta Hornad as Lakshmi
- Chikkanna as Raahul's friend
- K. Manju as himself, a film producer
- Sadhu Kokila as acting trainer
- H. G. Dattatreya
- Dharma as Police Inspector
- Veena Sundar
- Rakshit Shetty as himself, cameo appearance

== Production ==
Sudeepa was the original choice for the role that was eventually played by Ravishankar.

== Soundtrack ==
Soundtrack was composed by Arjun Janya.

Jigarthanda Soundtrack by Arjun Janya
No.	Title	Lyrics	Singers	Length
1.	"Kai Eththi"	V. Nagendra Prasad	Ravi Shankar
2.	"Naa Gudisi"	V. Nagendra Prasad	Vyasaraj, Anuradha Bhat
3.	"Ding Dong"	V. Nagendra Prasad	Vijay Prakash
4.	"Cinema Flop Aagutt"	Chandan Shetty	Santhosh Venky
