= Dhumm =

2002 film by M.S. Ramesh

- Music VCD Cover
- Directed by: M. S. Ramesh
- Screenplay by: M. S. Ramesh; R. Rajashekhar
- Story by: A. R. Murugadoss
- Based on: Dheena (Tamil)
- Produced by: Kanakapura Srinivas; K. P. Srikanth
- Starring: Sudeep; Rakshita
- Cinematography: H. C. Venu
- Edited by: S. Manohar
- Music by: Gurukiran
- Production company: SRT Entertainments
- Distributed by: Ramu Enterprises
- Release date: 27 September 2002
- Running time: 139 minutes
- Country: India
- Language: Kannada

Dhumm is a 2002 Indian Kannada-language action drama film directed by M. S. Ramesh, starring Sudeep and Rakshita. The film features background score and soundtrack composed by Gurukiran and lyrics by Kaviraj and V. Nagendra Prasad. The film was released on 27 September 2002. It was a critical and commercial success. The film was dubbed in Telugu as Hero No.1 and in Hindi as Dumdaar. This movie is a remake of Tamil movie Dheena (2001) starring Ajith Kumar, with major plot changes with sentimental flashbacks.

== Plot ==
The protagonist Varada (Sudeep) is like fire when faced with injustice. His heart is cool as ice otherwise. He picks up a machete for a solid reason and continues his vengeance when required. His mother is against Varada's violent principles but Varada thinks he is the only bad element in the house and never gives up his ideals. But subconsciously Varada is also struggling to get a good name and this is established in the climax.

The fiery handsome guy in love with his opponent's daughter (Rakshita) reaches a tight spot when his sister is murdered. He hatches a clever plot and fulfills his task of restoring the glory of his father. He begs his mother to accept him as a good son after settling his scores with some goons.

== Cast ==
- Sudeep as Varada
- Rakshita as Preethi
- Srinath as Varada and Shankar's father
- Sumithra as Varada and Shankar's mother
- Nassar as Shankar, Varada's brother
- Rangayana Raghu as M.L.A.
- Arun Sagar as Vinod (Preethi's brother)
- Sadhu Kokila as Varada's friend
- Chitra Shenoy as Preethi's sister

== Soundtrack ==
The soundtrack was composed by Gurukiran collaborating with Sudeep for the second time after Chandu (2002). All the lyrics were written by V. Nagendra Prasad. The soundtrack was released by Ashwini Recording Company.

Dhumm

Soundtrack album by Gurukiran
- Released: 2002
- Recorded: Ashwini Recording Company
- Genre: Feature film soundtrack
- Length: 23:01
- Language: Kannada
- Label: Ashwini Audio
- Producer: Gurukiran

Gurukiran chronology
Dhruva (2002)	Dhumm (2002)	Hollywood (2002)

No.	Song	Singer(s)	Lyricist
1	"Savaligu Kavaligu"	Shankar Mahadevan	V. Nagendra Prasad
2	"Ee Touchali Eno Ide"	Lakshmi Nataraj	V. Nagendra Prasad
3	"Ameeshage Tensionu"	Gurukiran; Sowmya Raoh	Kaviraj
4	"Mataadu Mathaadu"	Hariharan	V. Nagendra Prasad
5	"Baa Ba Baara"	Suresh Wadkar; K. S. Chithra	V. Nagendra Prasad

== Reception ==
Chitraloka.com wrote that "This is an action extravaganza. M.S.Ramesh has really showed his ‘guts’ in making a nice action film that stands out from other action films. The dialogues and wonderful performance by key artists have boosted up the quality of the film. [...] Congrats for the convincing job done by Ramesh and Team".

Regarding the Telugu dubbed version Hero No. 1, Gudipoodi Srihari of The Hindu wrote that "Sudeep does not look like a debut-making hero. He plays his role with ease".

== Awards ==
Awards and nominations
Award	Wins	Nominations
Filmfare Awards South	1	N/A
- Totals
Awards won	1
Nominations	N/A

Filmfare Awards South :-

- Best Music Director – Kannada(2002) - Gurukiran
