= Ambi Ning Vayassaytho =

- Poster
- Directed by: Gurudatta Ganiga
- Written by: Sudeepa
- Based on: Pa. Pandi by Dhanush
- Produced by: Jack Manju
- Starring: Ambareesh; Sudeepa; Suhasini Maniratnam; Sruthi Hariharan
- Cinematography: Jebin Jacob
- Edited by: Kiran
- Music by: Arjun Janya
- Production companies: Kiccha Creatiions; KSK Showreel Productions
- Distributed by: Mysore Talkies
- Release date: September 27, 2018
- Running time: 125 minutes
- Country: India
- Language: Kannada

Ambi Ning Vayassaytho (transl. Ambi, you have aged) is a 2018 Indian Kannada language film directed by Gurudattha Ganiga in his directorial debut. The film features Ambareesh in the lead role, while Sudeepa plays the role of Ambareesh during his young age. It is the last acting assignment of Ambareesh before his death. Actress Suhasini Maniratnam plays the lead role opposite Ambareesh, marking their collaboration after 14 years. Sruthi Hariharan, Dileep Raj, Rockline Venkatesh and others play the key supporting roles. The title of this film was suggested by Sudeepa. The film is a remake of the 2017 Tamil film Pa. Pandi which was directed by actor Dhanush.

The film was produced by Jack Manju & KSK Showreel Productions along with Sudeepa's own banner, Kiccha Creations. Music for the movie was composed by Arjun Janya whilst the cinematography was by Jebin Jacob and editing by Kiran. The screenplay was written by Sudeepa. The film was released on 27 September 2018 to a positive response from critics.

== Plot ==
Ambi (Ambareesh) is a successful stunt master who lives in Bengaluru with his son, daughter-in-law & his 2 grandchildren. In his younger age, Ambi was in love with Nandini. But due to her father's opposition, she had to marry a boy of her father's choice.

One day on his way home, Ambi comes across a drug peddling gang, and he ends up in a fight where he beats up all of them badly. This turns into a police case, and Ambi gets arrested due to the complaint lodged against him by the drug peddling gang. Knowing this, Ambi's son (Dilip Raj) gets mad at his father for interfering in such conflicts and later goes on to bail him out of the case. Ambi feels very disappointed with his son's reaction, and this leads to some heated conversation between them.

After this incident, Ambi decides to leave his house & goes on a solo bike ride to enjoy some lonely time & also to find his lost love, Nandini (Suhasini). The question of if they will get reunited forms the crux of the story.

== Cast ==
- Ambareesh as Ambareesh (Ambi)
  - Sudeepa as Young Ambareesh (Ambi)
- Suhasini Maniratnam as Nandini
  - Sruthi Hariharan as Young Nandini
- Shivaraj KR Pete, Ambi's friend
- Dileep Raj as Ambi's Son
- Rockline Venkatesh as Police Officer
- Doddanna (guest appearance)
- Jai Jagadish (guest appearance)
- Avinash as Nandini's Father
- Veena Ponnappa as Ambi's Daughter in Law
- Sangeetha as Ambi's Wife
- Kari Subbu (guest appearance)
- Gouthami Gowda as Nandhini's daughter
- Ram Manjunaath as Gym Owner
- Abhishek Das as Karthik, Ambi's neighbour
- Geetha Bharathi Bhat as Ambi's Cousin
- M K Mata as Mutton Stall owner
- Nihal Sagar Vishnu as Ambi's Grandchild
- Baby Shreya as Ambi's Grandchild
- Master Alaap as Nandini's brother
- Master Puttaraju as Ambi's Son (childhood)
- Rishab Shetty as director of the movie (cameo)
- Adi Lokesh as hero of the movie (cameo)
- Ravi Varma as fight master (cameo)

== Production ==
Ambareesh was initially hesitant to do the film, but Rajinikanth suggested that he should watch Pa. Pandi before deciding. Ambareesh subsequently watched the film, enjoyed the character and agreed to do the remake. Pre-production of this movie began in 2018 with the CG- Computer graphics Work of matching Sudeepa's height for Ambareesh's height for the character of younger Ambareesh. Technicians who have worked for Shah Rukh Khan’s 2015 film Fan have also worked for this movie.

== Soundtrack ==
Ambi Ning Vayassaytho

Soundtrack album by Arjun Janya
- Released: 5 September 2018
- Recorded: 2018
- Genre: Soundtrack
- Length: 20:20
- Label: Anand Audio Video
- Producer: Arjun Janya

Arjun Janya chronology
The Villain (2018)	Ambi Ning Vayassaytho (2018)	Victory 2 (2018)

Arjun Janya has composed the soundtrack and background music for the film. The soundtrack album consists of five songs. Lyrics for the tracks were written by Yogaraj Bhat, Jogi Prem and Pradyumna Narahalli.

Track-List
No.	Title	Lyrics	Singer(s)	Length
1.	"Jaleela"	Jogi Prem	Vijay Prakash	3:52
2.	"Mathaado Thareya"	V. Nagendra Prasad	Gummineni Vijay Babu	4:16
3.	"Oh Kshana"	V. Nagendra Prasad	Anirudh	4:03
4.	"Just Fly"	Chetan Kumar	Vijay Prakash	3:59
5.	"Ambi Ninge Vayassaytho"	V. Nagendra Prasad	Aadhya, Venugopal, Abhinav, Neha, Ankitha, Sanvi Shetty, Abhijath	4:10
Total length:				20:20
