= Gopika Poornima =

Indian playback singer

Gopika Poornima Mallikarjun
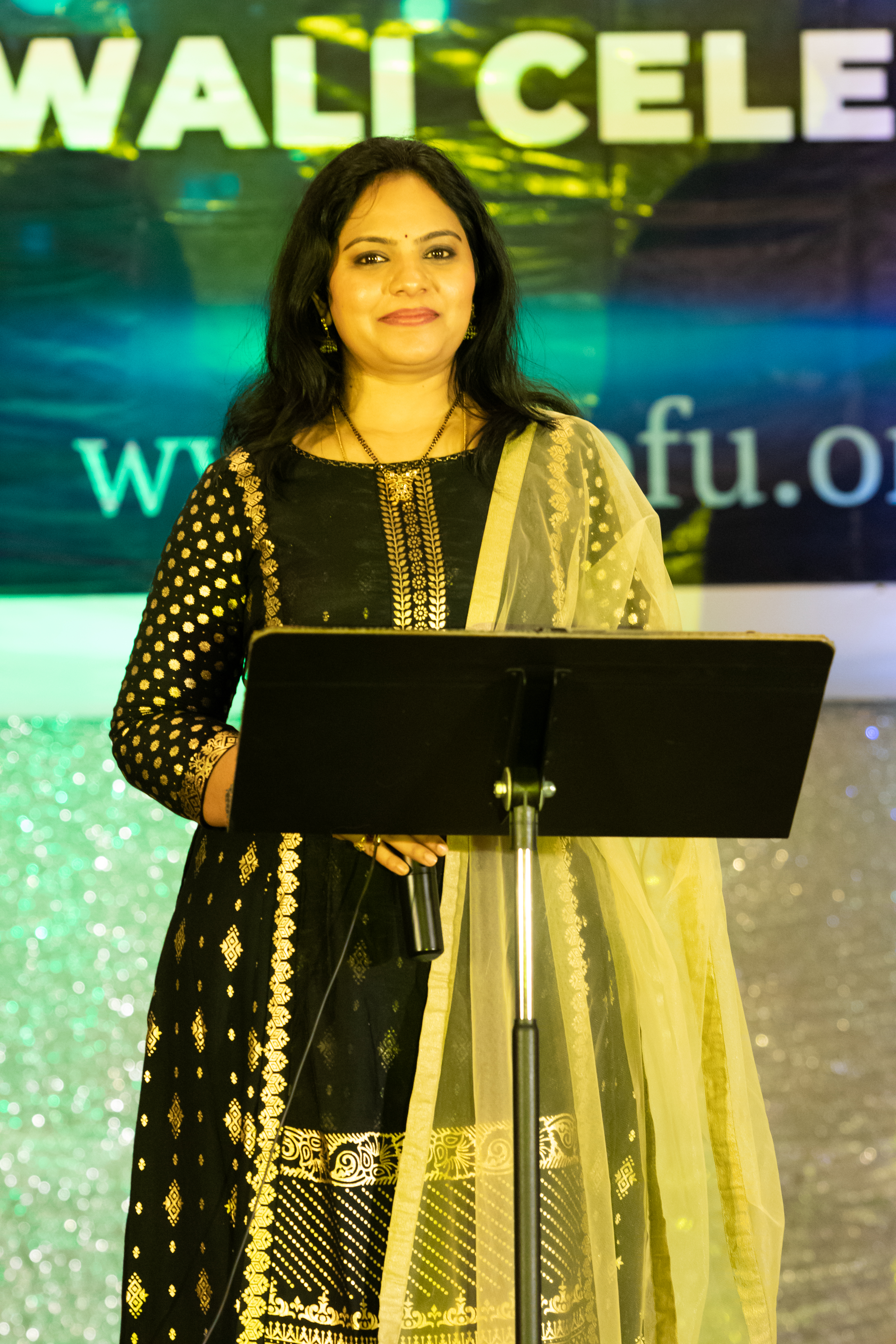

Background information
- Born: Madhurapantula Gopika Purnima; 2 January 1982; Age (42); Vizianagaram, Andhra Pradesh, India
- Origin: Hyderabad, Telangana; Chennai, Tamil Nadu
- Genre: Playback singing
- Occupation: Singer
- Instrument: Vocals
- Years active: 1997–present

Gopika Poornima is an Indian singer who mostly sings for Telugu, Tamil, and Kannada language films. She became popular with the singing competition Padutha Theeyaga. Her husband Mallikarjun is also a singer and composer in the Telugu Film Industry.

== Personal life ==
Gopika was born in Vizianagaram and brought up in Hyderabad. After her initial training in carnatic classical music from her own Aunt Smt. M Padma, Gopika further trained under renowned Padmabhushan Smt. Sudha Raghunathan, Smt. Lalitha Sivakumar, Smt. Prabhavathi and at present she is under the tutelage of the famous classical exponent Smt. Binni Krishnakumar. Her father was a senior manager in a central government office in Hyderabad. She participated in the first edition of singing reality show Padutha Theeyaga hosted by ETV. She got opportunities as a playback singer in films through this show and it was also at this time Gopika Poornima participated in musical reality shows in National channels like Star Plus Meri Aawaz Suno and Zee Sa Re Ga Ma Pa. She met her future husband Mallikarjun in the same programme. After this programme, her father took voluntary retirement from his service and shifted to Chennai to train her in classical music and seek opportunities in professional singing.

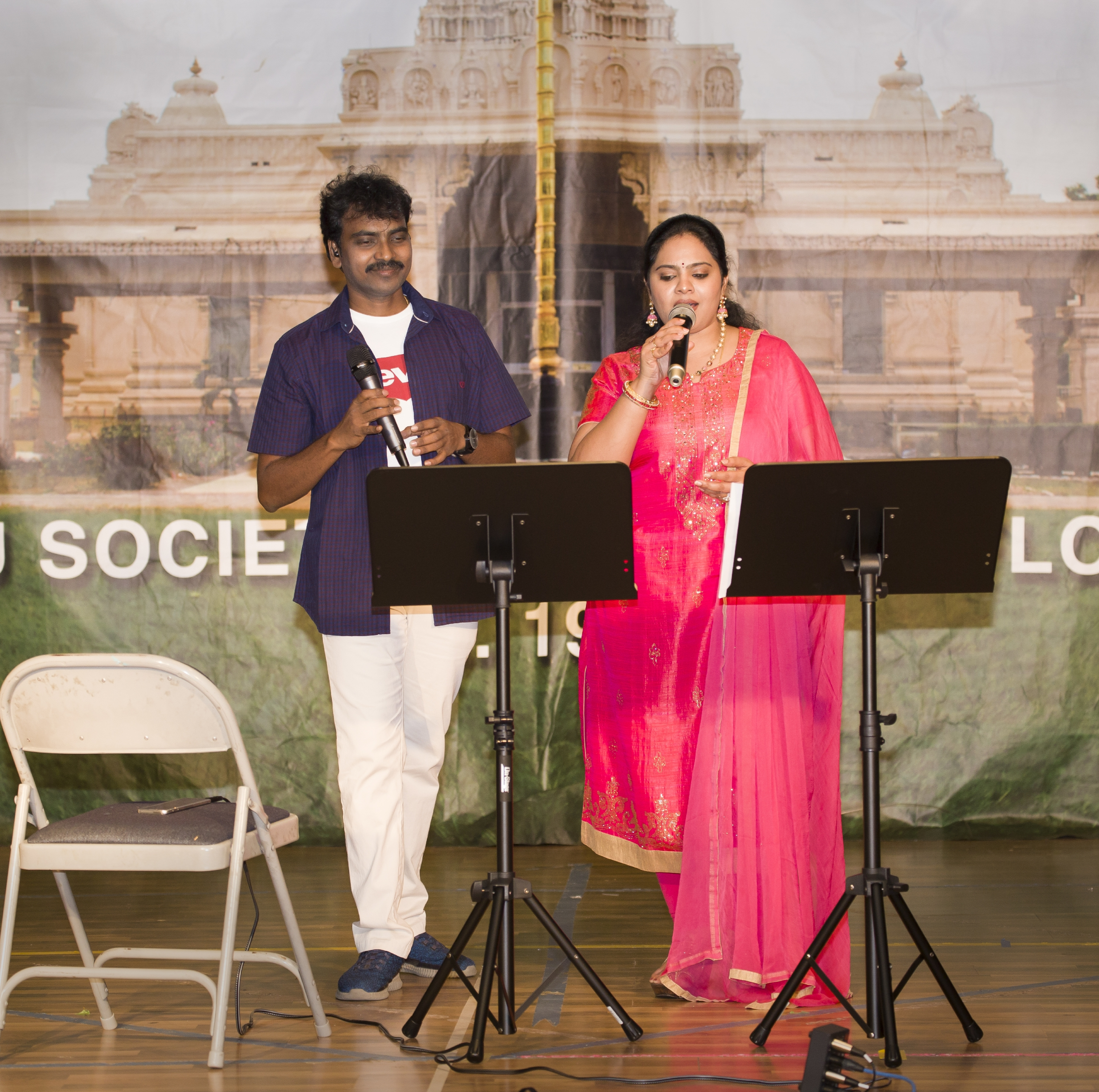
Gopika Poornima and Mallikarjun.

Mallikarjun too shifted his base to Chennai to pursue playback singing. Later they fell in love with each other and got married on 10 February 2008 in Simhachalam. They have one daughter named Veda Samhitha. Currently they are living in Chennai.

== Career ==
Gopika made her debut as a playback singer in the film Singanna in 1997. The music for this film was composed by Vandemataram Srinivas. He invited Gopika and Mallikarjun to sing for a song in that film. Incidentally, they recorded their first song in the same studio where S. P. Balasubrahmanyam sang for the first time.

Gopika Poornima has sung more than 500 songs in films and 4000 Devotional songs under renowned music composers like M. S. Viswanathan, Ilaiyaraaja, A. R. Rahman, Koti, Vidyasagar, S. A. Rajkumar, Sirpy, Deva, M. M. Keeravani, Mani Sharma, Harris Jayaraj, Devi Sri Prasad, Yuvan Shankar Raja, Chakri, Vandemataram Srinivas, S. S. Thaman, Anup Rubens and many others.

She is one of the core singers in the musical band "Suswana" along with Mallikarjun and Parthu formed in 2016 and performed in countries like India (Visakhapatnam, Chennai, Tirupati, Hospet), United States (Dallas, Texas), Oman (Muscat), Kuwait.

Gopika Poornima regularly sings in "Swarabhishekam" program telecast in ETV on every Sunday .

== Concerts ==
Gopika Poornima has done more than 200 shows across the world. She also participated in various musical concerts in the countries like United States of America, United Kingdom (England, Ireland, Scotland), (Germany), New Zealand, Australia, Canada, Malaysia, Singapore, Kenya, Japan, Arab World (Kuwait, Dubai, Oman, Saudi Arabia, Qatar) along with famous singers S. P. Balasubrahmanyam, S. P. Sailaja, S. Janaki, Shankar Mahadevan, G. Anand and composers like A. R. Rahman, Mani Sharma, Devi Sri Prasad, S. S. Thaman. She gave classical concert (Annamacharya Kirtan) in front of the former President of India Pratibha Patil and other delegates in the inauguration ceremony of Annadana Bhavan in Tirupati 2011.

=== Performances ===
- World Tour with A. R. Rahman in 2003.
- Performed in United States and UK with G. Anand team along with S. Janaki and P. Suseela in 1998.
- Performed extensively with S. P. Balasubrahmanyam across the world in his team.
- Music concerts for TANA (Telugu Association of North America) in 2013.
- Music concerts for ATA (American Telugu Association) in 2008 along with music composer Devi Sri Prasad.
- Music concerts for TCAGT (Telugu Cultural Association of Greater Toronto) in 2014 along with music composer S. S. Thaman.
- Music concerts for NATA (North America Telugu Association) in 2014.
- Performed at TAL (Telugu Association of London) in England 2017.
- Performed at MATA (Mana Telugu Association) in (Germany) 2016.

== Awards ==
- She got the Nandi Award for Best Female Playback Singer for the serial Priyanka (ETV) in the TV Section 2003.
- She got the Maa Music Award for the Best Female Singer for the film Dhamarukam in 2013.
- She was also nominated for the Best Female Playback Singer for the song Lali Lali in the film Dhamarukam Filmfare Awards South in 2013 and for Bommanu Geesthe - Bommarillu in 2007.

== Dubbing artist ==
She has given voice for the Actresses like Manisha Koirala, Ameesha Patel, Sadha, Shriya Saran in various films.

| Year | Film | Language | Dubbed For |
|---|---|---|---|
| 2001 | Abhay | Telugu (Dubbed version) | Manisha Koirala |
| 2003 | Naani | Telugu | Ameesha Patel |
| 2003 | Praanam | Telugu | Sadha |
| 2005 | Naa Alludu | Telugu | Shriya Saran |
| | Panchatantra | Telugu | Devi |

== TV programmes ==
- Participated as a Judge in the musical competition "BLACK" along with D. V. Mohan Krishna conducted by ETV.
- Participated as a Judge and Team leader in the musical competition Airtel "SUPER SINGER 9" conducted by Star Maa in 2015.
- Participated as a Judge in the musical competition "STAR OF AP" conducted by Gemini TV.

== Discography ==
=== Telugu songs (selected) ===
| Year | Film | Song | Music director | Co-singer | |
|---|---|---|---|---|---|
| 1997 | Singanna | Kalaganti kalaganti | Vandemataram Srinivas | Mallikarjun | |
| 1998 | Antahpuram | Sivamettera Sambayya | Ilaiyaraja | Shankar Mahadevan | |
| 1998 | Pelli Pandiri | Nestaam Iddari Lokam | Vandemataram Srinivas | S. P. Balasubrahmanyam | |
| 1999 | Time (Dubbed version) | Manchu Muthyama | Ilaiyaraaja | Devan Ekambaram | |
| 1999 | Sparsha | Mansuna pongina | Hamsalekha | Pankaj Udhas | |
| 1999 | Ramasakkanodu | Nee kallalone ummadamma | Koti | S. P. Balasubrahmanyam | |
| 2000 | Kouravudu | Rayanti raraju | Mani Sharma | | |
| 2000 | Nuvve Kavali | Ekkada unna | Koti | Sriram Prabhu | |
| 2000 | Goppinti Alludu | Nee height India gatu | Koti | Sukhwinder Singh | |
| 2000 | Chala Bagundi | Sreekaram edi maro | Koti | Parthasarathy (Parthu) | |
| 2000 | Oke Maata | Kolo kolo koilallu | Koti | Sukhwinder Singh | |
| 2000 | Jayam Manadera | Happy ga jolly ga | Vandemataram Srinivas | Sonu Nigam | |
| 2000 | Ammo! Okato Tareekhu | Navvuko pichi nayana | Vandemataram Srinivas | Mano | |
| 2000 | Bachi | Habibi | Chakri | Mano | |
| 2000 | Antha Mana Manchike | I love you | Veeremani k | Mano | |
| 2000 | Manasichanu | Mama miya mama | Sathya | Mano | |
| 2001 | Paravasam | Paravasam | A. R. Rahman | Febi Mani | |
| 2001 | Prematho Raa | Gopala | Mani Sharma | Shankar Mahadevan | |
| 2001 | Bhalevadivi Basu | Ammammo brahma | Mani Sharma | Shankar Mahadevan | |
| 2001 | Cheppalani Undi | Vennela chinuka | Mani Sharma | Sriram Prabhu | |
| 2001 | 12B (Dubbed version) | Mela Thalatho | Harris Jayaraj | Mallikarjun | |
| 2001 | Rayalaseema Reddana | Mavida kumma | Deva | | |
| 2001 | Chiranjeevulu | Palley pachani | A.B.murali | Srinivas | |
| 2002 | Aadi | Ayyo rama anjaneya | Mani Sharma | S. P. Balasubrahmanyam | |
| 2002 | Joruga Husharuga | Jajula jallulo | Mani Sharma | Sriram Prabhu | |
| 2002 | O Chinadana | Veelu choosi | Vidya Sagar | Tippu | |
| 2002 | Neetho Cheppalani | Oh Missu Oh Vacchindi | Koti | Tippu | |
| 2002 | Remo | Achu bellam | Dhina | Khushi Murali | |
| 2003 | Nee Manasu Naaku Telusu | Yedo yedo | A. R. Rahman | Karthik | |
| 2003 | Raghavendra | Adugulona | Mani Sharma | Mallikarjun | |
| 2003 | Palnati Brahmanayudu | Sarasala sundarayya | Mani Sharma | Karthik | |
| 2003 | Abhimanyu | Nee perento telusu | Mani Sharma | Mallikarjun | |
| 2003 | Pellam Oorelithe | Mila mila merise | Mani Sharma | S. P. Balasubrahmanyam | |
| 2003 | Ori Nee Prema Bangaram Kanu | chelimi | Mani Sharma | | |
| 2003 | Aadanthe Ado Type | Andhame aanandam | Yuvan Shankar Raja | Karthik | |
| 2003 | Anaganaga Oka Kurradu | Cell phone dwani | Chakri | Chakri | |
| 2003 | Praanam | Nindu nureela savasam (sad) | Kamalakar | Kamalakar | |
| 2003 | Neeke Manasichanu | Magha masam | Sri Kommineni | Rajesh Krishnan | |
| 2003 | Ottu Ee Ammay Evaro Teleedu | Manasu Manasu | Ghantadi Krishna | | |
| 2003 | Premalo Pavani Kalyan | O priya | Ghantadi Krishna | Hariharan | |
| 2003 | 2004 | Naani | Naaku nuvvu | A. R. Rahman | Hariharan |
| Spiderman | 2004 | Naani | Kunal Ganjawala | A. R. Rahman | |
| Yagnam | 2004 | Hayiga amma | Mani Sharma | | |
| Sakhiya | 2004 | Nannochi thakindi | Mani Sharma | Karthik | |
| Naa Autograph | 2004 | Gamma gamma hungama | M. M. Keeravani | S. P. Balasubrahmanyam | |
| Kaasi | 2004 | Marugelara | Sri Kommineni | | |
| 2005 | Mumbai Xpress (Dubbed version) | Lera Addu Tappuko | Ilaiyaraaja | S. P. Balasubrahmanyam | |
| 2005 | Aaru | Hrudayam anu | Devi Sri Prasad | | |
| 2005 | News (Dubbed version) | Sari sari atalo | Gurukiran | Tippu | |
| 2006 | Pournami | Pallakivai | Devi Sri Prasad | | |
| 2006 | Rakhi | Ninnu choosthe | Devi Sri Prasad | Shankar Mahadevan | |
| 2006 | Bommarillu | Bommanu geesthe | Devi Sri Prasad | Srinivas | |
| 2006 | Manasundi Kani | Pena vey nannu | Karthik Raja | Tippu | |
| 2006 | Dongodi Pelli | Holi | Raj Kiran | Tippu | |
| 2006 | I Love You | Prema | Madhavapeddi Suresh | | |
| 2007 | Shankar Dada Zindabad | Bhoogolamantha | Devi Sri Prasad | Adnan Sami | |
| 2007 | Aata | Kakiknada kaaja | Devi Sri Prasad | Tippu | |
| 2007 | Nava Vasantham | Aakasam | S. A. Rajkumar | Srinivas | |
| 2007 | Veedu Mamulodu Kadu | Kamala pandu | S. A. Rajkumar | Karthik | |
| 2007 | Pellaindi Kaani | Ammalaali jo | Kamalakar | K. S. Chitra | |
| 2007 | Na Route Veru | Yevarive sarigma | Deva | | |
| 2008 | Jalsa | Gallo thelinatundhe | Devi Sri Prasad | Tippu | |
| 2008 | King | Nuvvu ready | Devi Sri Prasad | Shankar Mahadevan | |
| 2008 | Ready | Na pedavulu | Devi Sri Prasad | Sagar | |
| 2008 | Gorintaku | Dum dum dum | S. A. Rajkumar | Udit Narayan | |
| 2008 | Visakha Express | Oh prema | Vijay Karakula | S. P. Balasubrahmanyam | |
| 2009 | Punnami Naagu | Om namah shivaya | S. A. Rajkumar | Rahul | |
| 2009 | Snehituda... | Ayyo rama | Shankar | Jassie Gift | |
| 2009 | Naa Style Veru | Guppedu gundello | Anup Rubens | Karthik | |
| 2010 | Rambabu Gadi Pellam | Vanitha | Kamalakar | Tippu | |
| 2010 | Kathi Kantha Rao | Kattilantodu | Mallikarjun | Tippu | |
| 2011 | Mr. Perfect | Aggipulla lanti | Devi Sri Prasad | | |
| 2012 | Gabbar Singh | Aakasam ammayi | Devi Sri Prasad | Shankar Mahadevan | |
| 2012 | Damarukam | Laali laali | Devi Sri Prasad | | |
| 2012 | Naagamani | Naanaluvule | S.P.S Vaasu | Sri Krishna | |
| 2013 | Crazy | Nuvve nuvve | S. S. Thaman | Suchith Suresan | |
| 2013 | Preme Jeevitham | O nimisham | Deva | Unni Menon | |
| 2013 | Manikyam 420 | Thayya thayya | Bharadwaj | | |
| 2014 | Veerudokkade | Maata thattadhu | Devi Sri Prasad | M. L. R. Karthikeyan | |
| 2014 | Chandrakala | Kathilagundi | Bharadwaj | Mallikarjun | |
| 2017 | Rarandoi Veduka Chudham | Raandoy veduka chudam | Devi Sri Prasad | Ranjith | |
| 2025 | 3BHK | "Kalalanni" | Amrit Ramnath | Hemachandra, Sahithi, P V N S Rohit | |

=== Tamil songs (selected) ===
| Year | Film | Song | Music director | Co-singer |
|---|---|---|---|---|
| 1998 | Anthapuram | Thai Thaga thai | Ilaiyaraaja | Shankar Mahadevan |
| 1999 | Thodarum | Shockadikkum | Ilaiyaraaja | Hariharan |
| 1999 | Time | Muthu Nilave | Ilaiyaraaja | Devan |
| 2000 | Thenali | Porkalam Ange | A. R. Rahman | Srinivas |
| 2000 | En Sakhiye | Ennadi Amma | Pradeep Ravi | |
| 2001 | Paarthale Paravasam | Pathale Paravasam | A. R. Rahman | Febi Mani |
| 2001 | Ponnana Neram | Kolusu Kolusu | Pradeep | Yugendharan |
| 2001 | Nadan Pennum Natupramaniyum | Mayilaadum Kunninmel | A.B.Murali | Santhosh Keshav |
| 2002 | Kadhal Samrajyam | Iru Kangal | Yuvan Shankar Raja | Balaram |
| 2002 | Kaadhal Galatta | Kaadhal Kacheri Adhu Neethan | Mani Sharma | Krishna Raj |
| 2002 | Kaadhal Galatta | Etho Etho Ennil | Mani Sharma | Srinivas |
| 2002 | Ayiram Poi Solli | Kadhali En Kadhali | Sabesh–Murali | Naveen Madhav |
| 2003 | Ennaku 20 Unnaku 18 | Yedo Yedo | A. R. Rahman | Karthik |
| 2003 | Kurumbu | Adicchi Pudichchi | Yuvan Shankar Raja | Afroze |
| 2003 | Kaala Tapadai | Maizhayoo puyaloo | Bharadwaj | Srinivas |
| 2004 | Udhaya | Enna enna | A. R. Rahman | Shankar Mahadevan |
| 2004 | Aasa Vachean & Siva | Neela vana | Chakri | |
| 2004 | Vaanam Vasappadum | Vaanam uyaram | Mahesh Mahadevan | Harish Raghavendra |
| 2005 | Vishwa Thulasi | En Maname | M. S. Viswanathan & Ilaiyaraaja | Tippu |
| 2005 | Vishwa Thulasi | Kanavilavathu | M. S. Viswanathan & Ilaiyaraaja | Karthik |
| 2005 | Aaru | Nenjum enum | Devi Sri Prasad | |
| 2005 | Pattalathan | Soldier soldier | Deva | Harish Raghavendra |
| 2005 | Sevvel | Unnai unnai | Aasan | Srinivas |
| 2006 | Paramasivan | Thangakkili | Vidya Sagar | Madhu Balakrishnan |
| 2008 | Santosh Subramaniam | Yeppadi irundha yem manasu | Devi Sri Prasad | Tippu |
| 2008 | Sangama | Kodu kodu varavanu | Devi Sri Prasad | |
| 2009 | Pournami Naagam | Om namah shivayya | S. A. Rajkumar | Rahul |
| 2009 | Adada Enna Azhagu | Adada enna azhagu | T.M.Jayamurugan | S. P. Balasubrahmanyam |
| 2012 | Apple Penne | Amma unnai | Mani Sharma | |
