= Mallikarjun (singer) =

Indian playback singer

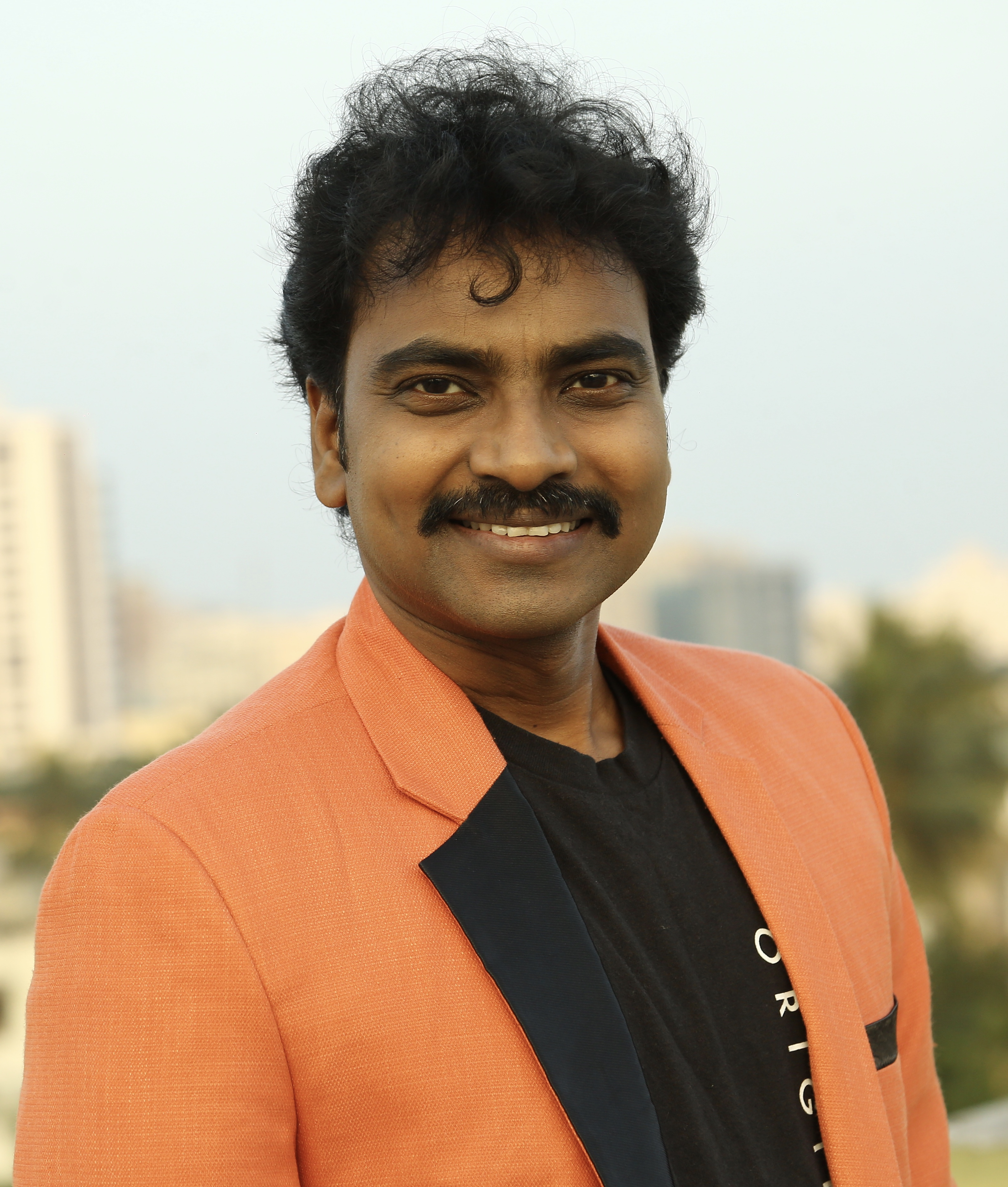

Background information
- Born: Boda Mallikharjuna Rao; March 5, 1976 (age 50); Srisailam, Andhra Pradesh, India
- Origin: Chennai, Tamilnadu; Visakhapatnam, Andhra Pradesh
- Genres: Film Score, Playback singing
- Occupations: Singer, composer
- Instruments: Vocals, keyboard
- Years active: 1997–present

Mallikarjun is an Indian playback singer and composer who mostly sings in Telugu, Tamil and Kannada language films. After emerging as one of the semi-finalists in the first edition of singing competition Padutha Theeyaga, he went on to become a playback singer in the South Indian film industry. He is married to playback singer Gopika Poornima. He is very well known as an energetic stage performer and ardent fan of Telugu actor Chiranjeevi.

== Personal life ==
Mallikarjun's father is an engineer in the Andhra Pradesh Irrigation department. He originally hails from Anakapalle of Visakhapatnam district. Mallikarjun was born when his father got transferred to Srisailam, a temple town. He was named after the local god Lord Mallikarjuna of Srisailam temple. His mother is a housewife. He has started learning music at the age of 9 and got recognition by padutha teeyaga musical competition. He has one sister.

He met his co-singer Gopika Poornima and they fell in love with each other and got married on 10 February 2008 in Simhachalam. They have one daughter named Samhitha. Currently they are living in Chennai.

== Career ==
Mallikarjun made his debut as a playback singer along with Gopika Poornima in Chennai for the movie Singanna on 23 February 1997 composed by Vandemataram Srinivas. He has sung more than 300 songs in films and 2000 private devotional albums. He also assisted renowned music composers like Koti for 1 year and Mani Sharma for 8 years. He has the prospect of singing for all the heroes in Telugu Film Industry. He made his debut as a Composer for the movie Kathi Kantha Rao in 2010. He is one of the core singer in the musical band "SUSWANA" along with Gopika Poornima and Parthu formed in 2016 and performed in countries like India (Visakhapatnam, Chennai, Tirupati, Hospet), United States (Dallas, Texas), Kuwait And Oman (Muscat).Mallikarjun regularly sings in "Swarabhishekam" program telecast in ETV on every Sunday.

== Awards ==
He got the Nandi Award for Best Male Playback Singer in 2003 for the serial Sukhadukhalu (ETV) in the TV Section.

== Concerts ==
Mallikarjun has done more than 200 shows across the world. He also participated in various musical concerts in the countries like United States of America, United Kingdom(England, Ireland, Scotland), Australia, New Zealand, Africa (South Africa, Kenya, Tanzania), (Germany), Canada, Malaysia, Singapore, Japan, Arab World (Kuwait, Dubai, Saudi Arabia, Oman, Qatar, Bahrain) with legendary singers like Padmabhushan S. P. Balasubrahmanyam, S. P. Sailaja and others.

=== Performances ===
Music concerts for TANA (Telugu Association of North America) in 2007 and 2013 along with famous music composer Mani Sharma.

- Music concerts for ATA (American Telugu Association) in 2006 and 2008 along with renowned music composers Mani Sharma and Devi Sri Prasad.
- Music concerts for NATA (North America Telugu Association) in 2014.
- Music concerts for TCAGT (Telugu Cultural Association of Greater Toronto) in Canada 2014 along with prominent music composer S. Thaman.
- Performed at WTF (World Telugu Federation) in Singapore and Dubai in 2002 and 2006 along with eminent music composer R. P. Patnaik.
- Performed extensively with renowned S. P. Balasubrahmanyam and G. Anand team across the world.
- Performed at TAL (Telugu Association of London) in England 2017.
- Performed at MATA (Mana Telugu Association) in Germany 2016.
- Performed at SATC-South African Telugu Community's Musical Concert in South Africa 4 November 2018 and 8 February 2020

== TV programmes ==
- Participated as a judge and team leader in the musical competition "Airtel Super Singer 9" conducted by Star Maa in 2015.
- Participated as a judge in the musical competitions like "STAR OF AP" and "STAR SINGER" conducted by Gemini TV and Vissa TV.

== Discography ==
=== Devotional ===
Private album by Musical Bee Productions

Year	Song available on youtube	Music director
2024	Sundarakanda Parayanam Telugu	Pavan Kumar

=== Composer ===
Year	Film
2010	Kathi Kantha Rao

=== Songs ===
Year	Film	Song	Music director
1997	Singanna	Kalaganti Kalaganti	Vandemataram Srinivas
2000	Chitram	Ekanthavela Ekantha Seva	R. P. Patnaik
2001	Anandam	Kanulu Terichinna	Devi Sri Prasad
2001	Anandam	Premante	Devi Sri Prasad
2001	Subbu	Love Passayyanu	Mani Sharma
2001	Nuvvu Nenu	Gunnamavi	R. P. Patnaik
2001	12B (D)	Mela Thalatho	Harris Jayaraj
2002	Aadi	Nee Navvula	Mani Sharma
2002	Indra	Ghallu Ghallu	Mani Sharma
2002	Bobby	Laalu Darwaja	Mani Sharma
2002	Sontham	Yepudu	Devi Sri Prasad
2002	Ninne Cherukunta	Nalo Vundi	M. M. Srilekha
2003	Anji	Manava Manava (Theatrical Version)	Mani Sharma
2003	Okkadu	Sahasam Swasaga	Mani Sharma
2003	Pellam Oorelithe	Jhoom Barabar Jhoom	Mani Sharma
2003	Inidhu Inidhu Kadhal Inidhu (Tamil)	"Kadhal Enbathu", "Lovena"	Devi Sri Prasad
2003	Raghavendra	Adugulona Adugu	Mani Sharma
2003	Palnati Brahmanayudu	Brindavanamlo	Mani Sharma
2003	Tagore	Manmadha Manmadha	Mani Sharma
2003	Abhimanyu	Nee Perento Telusu	Mani Sharma
2003	Ori Nee Prema Bangaram Kaanu	Padamati Sandhya Raagam	Mani Sharma
2003	Ezhumalai (Tamil)	Un Punnagai	Mani Sharma
2003	Varsham	Joole Joole	Devi Sri Prasad
2003	Sambaram	Pattudalatho	R. P. Patnaik
2003	Ela Cheppanu	Manchu Thakina	Koti
2003	Abbayi Premalo Paddadu	Abba Em Body	Vandemataram Srinivas
2004	Lakshmi Narasimha	Pappesuko Charesuko	Mani Sharma
2004	Adavi Ramudu	Nagaramu Lo	Mani Sharma
2004	Yagnam	Chamak Chamakmani	Mani Sharma
2004	Sri Anjaneyam	Rama Rama Raghuram	Mani Sharma
2004	Gudumba Shankar	Chitti Nadumune	Mani Sharma
2004	Sakhiya	Notilona	Mani Sharma
2004	Sakhiya	O Chandrama	Mani Sharma
2004	Vidyarthi	Em Pilla Matladavu	Mani Sharma
2004	Venky	Andala Chukala Lady	Devi Sri Prasad
2004	Abhi	Allari Chese	Devi Sri Prasad
2004	Jai	Neekosame	Anup Rubens
2004	Gowri	Gundello Gudiganta	Koti
2004	Idho Tareeku	Mandhistama	Vandemataram Srinivas
2005	Subash Chandra Bose	Mee Intlo Amma	Mani Sharma
2005	Athanokkade	Gunedelalo	Mani Sharma
2005	Narasimhudu	Yeluko Nayaka	Mani Sharma
2005	Allari Pidugu	Nede Eenade	Mani Sharma
2005	Jai Chiranjeeva	Jai Jai Ganesha (Uncredited)	Mani Sharma
2005	That Is Pandu	Jabilipayina	Mani Sharma
2005	Nuvvostanante Nenoddantana	Paripoke Pitta	Devi Sri Prasad
2005	Oka Oorilo	Oka Oorilo	Devi Sri Prasad
2005	Bhadra	Akasam Nelaku	Devi Sri Prasad
2005	Andarivadu	Paduchu Bangarama	Devi Sri Prasad
2005	Avunanna Kadanna	Suvvi Suvvi	R. P. Patnaik
2006	Evandoi Srivaru	Aandalu	Srikanth Deva
2006	Ranam	Vareeva Chandamama	Mani Sharma
2006	Veerabhadra	Sirimalli	Mani Sharma
2006	Seethakoka Chiluka	Chuputhoti	Mani Sharma
2006	Roommates	Hayire	Mani Sharma
2006	Ajay (Kannada)	Ene Aagali	Mani Sharma
2006	Illavatam (Tamil) (D)	Kechinaga	Mani Sharma
2006	Stalin	Siggutho Chi Chi (Uncredited)	Mani Sharma
2006	Ganaa	Yendukeevela	Vandemataram Srinivas
2006	Shankar	Nee Muthi Peppi	Vandemataram Srinivas
2007	Poramboku	Hi Voltage	Mani Sharma
2007	Chirutha	Kaneeti Vaana	Mani Sharma
2007	Okka Magadu	Nanu Paalinchaga	Mani Sharma
2007	Vaana	Muvaanti Maina	Kamalakar Rao
2007	Classmates	Mounamenduku	Koti
2007	Nee Navve Chalu	Emito Evela	Vandemataram Srinivas
2008	Aarya MBBS	Vennela Koona	Mani Sharma
2008	Mallika I Love You	Aaha Vooha	Yuvan Shankar Raja
2008	Sri Satyanarayana Swamy	Satyanarayan Vrathamu	Vandemataram Srinivas
2009	Dhammunodu	Mudhu Mudhu	Vandemataram Srinivas
2010	Subhapradam	Bailele Bailele	Mani Sharma
2010	Darling	Bulle	G. V. Prakash Kumar
2011	Mr. Perfect	Ningi Jaripadda	Devi Sri Prasad
2011	Mr. Perfect	Badhulu Thochani	Devi Sri Prasad
2011	Rangam	Nemali Kulukula	Harris Jayaraj
2011	Pandem Kollu	Ee Chitti Guvvena	G. V. Prakash Kumar
2012	Ramachari	Sudigalai	Mani Sharma
2012	Sakuni (D)	Ammalara Ayyalara	G. V. Prakash Kumar
2012	Siva Thandavam (D)	Mogali Puvvanti	G. V. Prakash Kumar
2013	Greeku Veerudu	Yevvaru Lerani	S. Thaman
2013	Gouravam	Manasa	S. Thaman
2013	Nenu Chala Worst	Padamara Vypunake	Parthasarathy (Parthu)
2013	Good Boy	Preminchave Pilla	Vandemataram Srinivas
2013	Adi c/o abn college	Nee Gali Soki	Vandemataram Srinivas
2013	Srinu c/o Anu	Cheliya Cheliya	Vandemataram Srinivas
2014	Beeruva	Pistolu Baava	S. Thaman
2014	Chandrakala	Kathilagundi	Bharadwaj
2016	Pittagoda	Emaindo	Kamalakar Rao
2018	Nela Ticket	O Sari Try Chey	Shakthikanth Karthick
2022	Sammathame	Baava Thaakithe	Shekar Chandra
2024	Naa Saami Ranga	Seesa Mootha Ippu	M. M. Keeravani
2024	Jewel Thief	Navuthu Sagali	M. M. Srilekha
2024	Sathyam Sundaram	Neevo	Govind Vasantha
