= Aaduthu Paaduthu =

2002 Indian film by Devi Prasad

- DVD cover
- Directed by: Devi Prasad
- Written by: Devi Prasad; Chintapalli Ramana (dialogues)
- Produced by: CV Reddy
- Starring: Srikanth; Sunil; Gayatri
- Cinematography: Shankar
- Edited by: Kola Bhaskar
- Music by: Chakri
- Production company: C. V. Arts
- Release date: 4 April 2002
- Country: India
- Language: Telugu

Aaduthu Paaduthu (transl. While playing and singing) is a 2002 Indian Telugu-language romantic comedy film directed by Devi Prasad. The film stars Srikanth, Sunil and Gayatri. The film was a box office success. It is a remake of the Malayalam film Ee Parakkum Thalika (2001).

== Cast ==
- Srikanth as Gopi
- Sunil as Papi
- Gayatri as Gayatri / Vasanthi
- Brahmanandam as a cop
- Dharmavarapu Subramanyam as the sub-inspector
- Tanikella Bharani as Bank manager
- M. S. Narayana as the cook
- Gautham Raju
- Aditya
- Naveen
- Sathibabu
- Sana

== Production ==
Srikanth plays an unemployed youth. Gayatri makes her debuts in Telugu with this film. The film was almost entirely shot in a bus.

== Soundtrack ==
Music by Chakri.

- "Aaduthu Paaduthu" - Ravi Varma, R B Jeeva
- "Chamakku Chamakku" - Kausalya
- "Navvave Chilakamma" - Pramod Babloo, Santhoshini, Vishwa
- "Neeli Neeli" - Hariharan, Kousalya
- "Rukumani" – Tippu, Moorthy

== Reception ==
Gudipoodi Srihari of The Hindu gave the film a negative review and opined that "IT HAS been proved time and again that a full-length comedy sans sensible storyline leads nowhere, as is the case with Aaduthoo.. Paaduthoo...". Jeevi of Idlebrain.com said that " Comedy alone cannot save a film when there is no grip on the screenplay. Film is little boring, at times". A critic from Sify wrote that "The film is a full-length comedy and Srikanth and Sunil are average. Newcomer Gayatri Jeyaram has done a good job and she is very confident in the role of Vasanthi. The music of Chakri is average." Arpan Panicker of Full Hyderabad opined that "But carried away by the enthu, he [Devi Prasad] loses track of what he was trying to do in the first place, and the result makes the viewer introspect for traces of masochism".

== Box office ==
The film had an average box office run and was Srikanth's second consecutive box office hit after O Chinadana (2002).
