= Evandoi Srivaru =

- DVD cover
- Directed by: E. Satti Babu
- Written by: Marudhuri Raja
- Screenplay by: E. Satti Babu
- Story by: Uday Raj
- Produced by: M. Dasaratha Raju
- Starring: Srikanth; Sneha; Nikita Thukral
- Cinematography: C. Ramprasad
- Edited by: Marthand K. Venkatesh
- Music by: Srikanth Deva; Deva (unc., 1 song)
- Production company: Sreeram Arts
- Release date: 12 May 2006
- Country: India
- Language: Telugu

Evandoi Srivaru is a 2006 Indian Telugu-language drama film directed by Satti Babu and produced by M. Dasaratha Raju starring Srikanth, Sneha and Nikita Thukral in the lead roles. The music was composed by Srikanth Deva.

== Plot ==
Chandrasekhar (Sarath Babu) disowns his daughter Divya (Sneha) when she goes against his wishes and marries Surya (Srikanth). She later dies after accidentally falling off of the roof of her house. Before dying, Divya makes a final wish to her husband of having her son brought up by her father. Surya then does his best to fulfill her final wish.

== Cast ==
- Srikanth as Surya
- Sneha as Divya
- Nikita Thukral as Sandhya
- Sarath Babu as Chandrasekhar
- Tanish as Divya's brother
- Rama Prabha as Aishwarya Rai
- Krishna Bhagavan as Watchman
- Chandra Mohan as Surya's father
- Rajyalakshmi as Sandhya's mother
- Sunil as Surya's friend
- Prudhvi Raj as himself
- Venu Madhav as Surya's brother-in-law
- Sudha as Surya's mother
- M. S. Narayana
- Dharmavarapu Subrahmanyam as Apartment secretary
- Hema as Apartment secretary's wife
- Raghunatha Reddy
- Lakshmipati
- Chitti Babu as Music troupe member
- Rocket Raghava

== Production ==
The muhurat took place on 5 May 2005 at Ramanaidu Studios, Hyderabad. This film marked the fourth collaboration between E. Sattibabu after Tirumala Tirupati Venkatesa (2000), O Chinadana (2002), and Ottesi Cheputunna (2003). The film underwent a partial change in crew and Raghuvaran was initially considered for Sarath Babu's role. Sneha and Nikita Thukral play sisters in the film.

== Soundtrack ==
The songs were composed by Srikanth Deva. The lyrics were written by Veturi and Ananta Sriram. The audio launch was held at Ramanaidu Studios on 6 January 2006 with E. V. V. Satyanarayana and Aryan Rajesh amongst the guests. The song "Adiga Brahmani" is based on "Azhage Bramhanidam" from Devathayai Kanden, composed by Srikanth Deva's father Deva. The song "Ayyayo Ayyayo" is based on "Ayyo Ayyo", from M. Kumaran Son of Mahalakshmi (2004), which itself is based on the Malaysian song "Hati Kama", composed by Pak Ngah.

- "Aandallu" – Mallikarjun, Sujatha
- "Adiga Brahmani" – Karthik, K. S. Chitra
- "Ayyayo Ayyayo" – Ranjith, Pop Shalini
- "Ippude" – Karthik, Sujatha
- "Kalayo Vyshnavamayo" – Prasanna, Kalpana
- "Vinayaka" – Tippu, Ganga

== Reception ==
In a retrospective review in 2021, a critic from The Times of India wrote, "The brilliant suspense in the Satti Babu directorial left everyone stunned".
