= Gayatri Jayaraman =

Indian actress and model

- Other name: Gayatri Jayaram
- Occupations: Actress, model
- Years active: 2001 – 2006 2017 – present
- Spouse: Samit Sawhny (m.2007)
- Children: Ishaan, Inara
- Parent(s): Jayaraman; Chitra

Gayatri Jayaraman is an Indian actress who appears in films and television shows. She is best known for her role in the Tamil film Manadhai Thirudivittai (2001). Her glamorous appearance in the song Manja Kaattu Maina from the film gave her massive recognition.

== Career ==
Gayathri began her career as an actress with director K. Balachander's tele-serial Azhukku Veshti and rejected offers from prominent directors such as Arjun before deciding to make her debut by featuring in Nagabharana's Neela. Neela, a Kannada film about a tribal singer with cancer.

Her Telugu film debut was with Srikanth in Aaduthu Paaduthu, before she also went on to feature in a supporting role in Shree alongside Suriya, with Gayatri revealing that her role was chopped by the editors in post-production.

She retired from films after her marriage and is now a certified scuba diving instructor in the Andaman Islands and briefly returned to compere the Chennai Super Kings Cheer Leaders talent show on Vijay TV in 2009. She also notably, anchored the show Super Kudumbam on Sun TV in early 2013.

== Personal life ==
They are parents to two children—a son and a daughter.

== Filmography ==
Year	Film	Role	Language	Notes
2001	Neela	Neela	Kannada	
2001	Asoka	Gypsy Dancer	Hindi	Special appearance
2001	Manadhai Thirudivittai	Shruthi	Tamil	
2002	Aaduthu Paaduthu	Gayatri / Vasanthi	Telugu	
2002	Shree	Stella	Tamil	
2002	April Maadhathil	Nimmi	Tamil	
2003	Vaseegara	Asha	Tamil	
2004	Njan Salperu Ramankutty	Sangeetha	Malayalam	
2005	Lokanathan IAS	Durga	Malayalam	
2005	Swamy	Aishwarya	Kannada	
2006	Naidu LLB		Telugu	
2021	Uppena	Sangeetha's mother	Telugu	
2021	Lanke		Kannada	

== Television ==
Serials

Year	Title	Role	Language	Channel
2000	Shree Ganesh	Devi Adishakti	Hindi	Sony TV
2000	Micro Thodargal-Azhukku Vetti	Rasathi	Tamil	Raj TV
2001	Micro Thodargal-Nizhal Vilaiyattu	Gayathri	Tamil	Raj TV
2017–2018	Nandhini	Bhairavi	Tamil	Sun TV
2019–2020	Azhagu	Shakunthala Devi	Tamil	Sun TV
2021–2022	Kayal	Sivasankari	Tamil	Sun TV
2022	Valli Thirumanam	Vasundhara	Tamil	Colors Tamil
2023	Mr. Manaivi	Muthulakshmi	Tamil	Sun TV
2024–2025	Thangamagal	Bhairavi	Tamil	Star Vijay
2025–2026	Aadukalam	Selvanayagi	Tamil	Sun TV
2026	Parijatham	Amman	Tamil	Zee Tamil

Shows

Year	Title	Role	Language	Channel
	Ilamai Pudhumai	Host	Tamil	Sun TV
	Telephone Manipol	Host	Tamil	Vijay TV
2006	Grandmaster	Herself	Tamil	Vijay TV
2009	Chennai Super Kings Cheer Leaders Talent Show	Herself	Tamil	Vijay TV
2012	Super Kudumbam	Herself	Tamil	Sun TV
2016	Achcham Thavir	Contestant	Tamil	Vijay TV
2018	Nandhini Kudumbam	Herself	Tamil	Sun TV

Web Series

Year	Title	Role	Language	Channel
2018	Dollhouse Diaries	Damayanthi	Tamil	MX Player
