= Sameer (Telugu actor) =

Indian actor

- Born: 26 February 1973 (age 53); Visakhapatnam, Andhra Pradesh, India
- Other name: Vinnakota Venkata Sameer
- Occupation: Actor
- Spouse: Aparna

Vinnakota Venkata Sameer is an Indian actor who predominantly appears in Telugu films and television.

== Early life ==
Sameer Hasan was born in Visakhapatnam, Andhra Pradesh, to a Muslim father Intikhab Hasan and a Brahmin mother Mahalaxmi. His father was absent during his childhood, and he was raised as a Hindu by his mother and maternal family.

== Career ==
He has acted in many TV serials broadcast on Doordarshan. He played a supporting role in Ruthu Ragalu. Sameer made his film debut in Subha Sankalpam (1995), directed by K. Viswanath.

== Personal life ==
Sameer has stated that he identifies as Hindu. He has worn the Ayyappa mala multiple times and regularly visits temples. In 2020, he revealed he has adopted his mother's surname and legally changed his name from Sameer Hasan to Vinnakota Venkata Sameer to reflect his maternal heritage.

He is married to Aparna and has a son. The couple won the finals of Moguds Pellams, a TV program conducted by MAA TV for celebrity couples.

== Filmography ==
- Prema Pusthakam (1993)
- Subha Sankalpam (1995)
- Aahaa..! (1998)
- Student No.1 (2001)
- Okato Number Kurradu (2002)
- Indra (2002)
- Simhadri (2003)
- Tagore (2003)
- Athade Oka Sainyam (2004)
- Love Today (2004)
- Samba (2004)
- Sye (2004)
- Mass (2004)
- Kaani (2004)
- Andagadu (2005)
- That Is Pandu (2005)
- Jai Chiranjeeva (2005)
- Lakshmi (2006)
- Sri Ramadasu (2006)
- Style (2006)
- Rakhi (2006)
- Chandamama (2007)
- Anasuya (2007)
- Pandurangadu (2008)
- Baladoor (2008)
- Hero (2008)
- Cell (2008)
- Magadheera (2009)
- Orange (2010)
- Khaleja (2010)
- Nagavalli (2010)
- Pilla Zamindar (2011)
- Mr Perfect (2011)
- Sri Rama Rajyam (2011)
- Sudigadu (2012)
- Damarukam (2012)
- Attarintiki Daredi (2013)
- Legend (2014)
- Laddu Babu (2014)
- Drushyam (2014)
- Govindudu Andarivadele (2014)
- Pataas (2015)
- Lion (2015)
- Kerintha (2015)
- Kick 2 (2015)
- Bruce Lee: The Fighter (2015)
- Bengal Tiger (2015)
- Sarrainodu (2016)
- Control C (2016)
- Manalo Okkadu (2016)
- Kittu Unnadu Jagratha (2017)
- Keshava (2017)
- Duvvada Jagannadham (2017)
- Agnyaathavaasi (2018)
- Pantham (2018)
- Saakshyam (2018)
- Devadas (2018)
- Desamlo Dongalu Paddaru (2018)
- Maharshi (2019)
- Kathanam (2019)
- Anukunnadi Okkati Ayyandhi Okati (2020)
- Idhe Maa Katha (2021)
- Akhanda (2021)
- Alludu Adhurs (2021)
- Dhamaka (2022) as Sanjay
- Lucky Lakshman (2022)
- Veera Simha Reddy (2023) as Rudra Reddy
- Bhari Taraganam (2023)
- Kismat (2024) as Loknath
- Paarijatha Parvam (2024)
- Purushothamudu (2024)
- Zebra (2024) as Janaki Raman
- Paderu 12th Mile (2025)
- Mad Square (2025)
- Sampradayini Suppini Suddapoosani (2026)

=== Television ===
- Ruthuragalu (DD Saptagiri)
- Lady Detective (ETV)
- Moguds Pellams (Maa TV)
- Na Mogudu Naku Sontham (ETV; 2016–2019)
- Bigg Boss 1 (Star Maa; 2017)
- Santhi Nivasam (ETV)
- Ala Venkatapuramlo (Gemini TV)
- Recce (ZEE5; 2022)
- AIR: All India Rankers (ETV Win; 2025)
- Objection, My Lord! (Zee5; 2026)
