= Janumada Gelathi =

- movie poster
- Directed by: Dinesh Baboo
- Written by: Dinesh Baboo
- Produced by: C. R. Manohar
- Starring: Srinagar Kitty; Pooja Gandhi; Ashish Vidyarthi
- Cinematography: Dinesh Baboo
- Edited by: Narahalli Jnanesh
- Music by: V. Manohar
- Production company: Golden Lion Film Division
- Release date: 5 December 2008
- Country: India
- Language: Kannada

Janumada Gelathi is a 2008 Kannada language film directed by Dinesh Baboo and produced by C. R. Manohar. it stars Srinagar Kitty and Pooja Gandhi in the lead roles. The film's music was composed by V. Manohar. The film was released statewide on 5 December 2008.

== Cast ==
- Srinagar Kitty as Gowri Shankar
- Pooja Gandhi
- Jayanthi
- Avinash
- Ashish Vidyarthi
- Suresh Mangalore
- Harish Rai

== Soundtrack ==
The film has five songs composed by V. Manohar with lyrics written by V. Manohar, Yogaraj Bhat, Jayanth Kaikini and V. Nagendra Prasad.

Janumada Gelathi

Studio album by V. Manohar
- Genre: Feature film soundtrack
- Label: Akshaya Audio
- Producer: C. R. Manohar

1. "Noorentu Maatu"
2. "Mugile Kodale"
3. "Hrudaya Mugulu Nagalu"
4. "Dhaga Dhagiso"
5. "Simran Simran"

== Reception ==
=== Critical response ===
R G Vijayasarathy of Rediff.com scored the film at 1 out of 5 stars and wrote "Srinagara Kitty makes efforts to give a convincing performance. Pooja Gandhi has also done well in her small role, though she would have looked better with make-up on! Veteran artists Jayanthi, Avinash, Suresh Mangalore and Harish Rai have limited scope in the film to perform. V Manohar's music is just okay. One song is well composed, but picturisation lacks quality". A critic from Bangalore Mirror wrote "There are moments in the film that have the classic Dinesh touch especially in scenes where both the lead actors play dumb and in the climax which could have retained a little more suspense. This film too has failed to launch Srinagar Kitti into Sandalwood star orbit".
