= The Villain (2018 film) =

2018 film directed by Prem

- Theatrical release poster
- Directed by: Prem
- Written by: Prem
- Produced by: C. R. Manohar
- Starring: Shiva Rajkumar; Sudeep
- Cinematography: Girish R. Gowda
- Edited by: Srinivas P. Babu
- Music by: Arjun Janya
- Production company: Tanvi Shanvi Films
- Distributed by: Jayaditya Films
- Release date: 18 October 2018
- Running time: 175 minutes
- Country: India
- Language: Kannada
- Budget: ₹40–45 Crore
- Box office: ₹54–57 crore

The Villain is a 2018 Indian Kannada-language action film written and directed by Prem and produced by C. R. Manohar. The film stars Shiva Rajkumar and Sudeepa in the lead roles alongside Amy Jackson, Srikanth and Mithun Chakraborty. The film's music was composed by Arjun Janya, while the cinematography and editing were handled by Girish R. Gowda and Srinivas P. Babu.

== Plot ==
The Villain revolves around Ramu, who is searching for someone whose mother's chain gets stolen by a chain-snatcher, who drops it somewhere during the chase. He meets a social activist, Seetha, who is saved by Ramu when unknown goons arrive to kill her and find his chain, but Seetha reveals it is her chain. When Ramu asks Seetha about the chain, she reveals Kaizer-Ram, who is a crime boss in Dubai and she met him in a drama, when he was travelling to Sri Lanka. Kaizer-Ram falls in love with Seetha and they meet at a temple, where he reveals that Kaizer and Ram are different people and that Kaizer is actually his best friend.

Later, unknown assassins arrive to kill Ram, and one of them reveals that Kaizer intends to kill Ram to make the Police department believe that Kaizer-Ram is dead. Seetha reveals that though she has fallen for Ram, she reveals herself as ACP Brahmavar's daughter, who wants to capture Ram to restore Brahmavar's honour. Dejected and betrayed, Ram surrenders to the police and later escapes and asks Seetha to arrive at a highway where he is caught by Kaizer and leaves in a car. Ram throws the chain and the pendrive before getting into the car. The car explodes killing Ram and Kaizer. In the present, Ramu is taken to meet Kaizer where he reveals to Ramu that Ram escaped from the explosion and is now known as Raavana in UK's crime syndicate.

At UK, Ram kills UK's underworld boss Thomas, with his friend Alex's help. Ramu leaves for UK and kidnaps Alex from the police convoy where he calls Ram and they challenge one another and a cat-mouse game ensues where Alex is killed, before Ramu tortures him to reveal about Ram. Ram comes across Seetha, who is now a call girl, but it is later revealed that she was sent by Ram. Later, Ramu reveals to Seetha that he is an orphan and meets Vishalavva, who is Ram's mother. Vishalavva reveals that Ram went missing when she and her husband Vishwanna had a fallout, who later died due to a heart stroke. Vishalavva requests Ramu to find Ram.

Ramu, who considers Vishalavva as her mother promises her that he will find Rama. Ram learns Ramu's identity and decides to confront him in Bangalore, but the minister, who supported Ram double-crosses him. Ramu returns to Bangalore and leaves for his village but Kaizer, having learnt of Ramu's agenda sends his henchman to attack him. Ram saves Ramu, who had double-crossed the minister by bribing his bodyguards and had arrived in Bangalore. Kaizer later dies due to a stroke, while seeing Ram. Ram and Ramu defeat the goons where Ramu reveals that his mother Vishalavva is alive and has been waiting to see him.

Ram refuses as Vishalavva expected him to be upright like Lord Rama, but has become Raavana and requests Ramu to tell Vishalavva that he died but before leaving, Ramu ask Rama to show Vishalavva at least once. Ramu meets Vishalavva, who doesn't believe that Ram is dead. Ram, overcome by emotion meets Vishalavva and reunites with her, much to Ramu and Seetha's happiness.

== Cast ==
- Shiva Rajkumar as Ramappa (Ramu) aka Raamaa
- Sudeepa as Rama (Ram) aka Raavana, An International Don
- Amy Jackson as Seetha (Voice by Rakshita)
- Srikanth as Kaizer
- Mithun Chakraborty as ACP Brahmavar (cameo appearance)
- Tilak Shekar as Alex (Ram's right hand)
- Saranya Ponvannan as Vishalavva, Ram's mother
- Sharath Lohitashwa as Vishwanna Ram's father
- Jai Jagadish as Aloknath, Commissioner
- Shobharaj as Police officer
- Dharma as Police officer
- Prathap as 'Kowde' Shastri, Ramu's friend
- Mandya Ramesh as Ramu's friend
- Shash as a Spy

=== Cameo appearances ===
- Rachita Ram as herself in the song "Bolo Bolo Ramappa"
- Shanvi Srivastava as herself in the song "Bolo Bolo Ramappa"
- Radhika Narayan as herself in the song "Bolo Bolo Ramappa"
- Samyukta Hornad as herself in the song "Bolo Bolo Ramappa"
- Shraddha Srinath as herself in the song "Bolo Bolo Ramappa"
- Bhavana Rao as herself in the song "Bolo Bolo Ramappa"

== Production ==
Director Prem announced new film starring Shiva Rajkumar and Sudeepa. The film is about a villager who dreams to become an actor. The film is produced by C. R. Manohar and they signed Bollywood actor Mithun Chakraborty in an important role that has been kept as a secret in the beginning, but the news was later leaked to the press. The film was launched by then Karnataka's Chief Minister Siddaramaiah on 13 December 2015 and the first look was released in March 2017. Before the release of the first look, the movie was titled as Kali taglined Ruler Warrior. But later it was changed to The Villain taglined Ram Ravan due for some reason. The film completed a schedule and was reported to have portions in England and two other foreign countries to be shot. By then, the film fetched ₹5.4 crore as Hindi rights. Actress Amy Jackson was signed as the female lead. The song "Jeeva Hoovagide" from Nee Nanna Gellalare composed by Ilaiyaraaja was shot with Shiva Rajkumar and Amy Jackson in replicated costumes of Rajkumar and Manjula from the original film in a schedule where entire talkie portions were shot, except few songs. Later, filming the climax was completed on 1 February as per actor Sudeepa's tweet.

== Music ==
The Villain

Soundtrack album by Arjun Janya
- Released: 20 August 2018
- Recorded: 2018
- Genre: Feature film soundtrack
- Length: 28:01
- Language: Kannada
- Label: Anand Audio
- Producer: Arjun Janya

Arjun Janya chronology
Kannadakkaagi Ondannu Otti (2018)	The Villain (2018)	Ambi Ning Vayassaytho (2018)

Singles from The Villain
- 1. "I am Villain" Released: 13 July 2018; 2. "Tick Tick Tick" Released: 20 July 2018

Arjun Janya was signed to compose music and background score for the movie.

Track list
No.	Title	Lyrics	Singer(s)	Length
1.	"I am Villain"	Prem	Shankar Mahadevan, Manoj Sharma	4:31
2.	"Tick Tick Tick"	Prem	Vijay Prakash, Kailash Kher, Prem, Siddharth Basrur	3:50
3.	"Love Aagoythe Nin Myale"	Prem	Prem, Chorus	4:35
4.	"Nodivalandava"	Prem	Armaan Malik, Shreya Ghoshal	4:11
5.	"Bolo Bolo Raamappa"	Prem	Vijay Prakash, Kushala and Chorus	4:22
6.	"Rana Rana Raavana"	Prem	Prem, Shreya Ghoshal	3:13

== Release ==
=== Theatrical ===
The Villain was released worldwide on 18 October 2018 to mixed reviews from critics.

== Reception ==
=== Box office ===
The makers claimed the first day collections to be ₹20 crores, but the trade speculated it to be inflated though agreed it to have collected the highest for a Kannada movie on its opening day. The first weekend gross collection was reported to be ₹29 crores. But it couldn't maintain the same momentum and collections fell and finally collected around ₹57 crores as against the claim of ₹60 crores by the makers.
