= Manadhai Thirudivittai =

2001 film by R. D. Narayanamurthy

- Poster
- Directed by: R. D. Narayanamurthy
- Written by: R. D. Narayanamurthy
- Produced by: K. R. Gangadharan
- Starring: Prabhu Deva; Kausalya; Gayatri Jayaraman
- Cinematography: R. Raghunatha Reddy
- Edited by: B. Lenin; V. T. Vijayan
- Music by: Yuvan Shankar Raja
- Production company: KRG Movies International
- Release date: 14 November 2001
- Running time: 150 minutes
- Country: India
- Language: Tamil

Manadhai Thirudivittai (transl. You have stolen my heart) is a 2001 Indian Tamil-language romantic comedy film written and directed by newcomer R. D. Narayanamurthy. The film stars Prabhu Deva in the main lead role alongside Kausalya and newcomer Gayatri Jayaraman, while Vadivelu, Vivek, Ranjith and Sriman play supporting roles. The film is produced by K. R. Gangadharan and the music is composed by Yuvan Shankar Raja.

Manadhai Thirudivittai released on 14 November 2001. The film received positive reviews and became a commercial success.

== Plot ==
Deva is a post-graduate student in Ooty musical college. He is an orphan who was raised in an orphanage and is studying on by his friend's sponsorship. College heartthrob Shruthi studies in an undergraduate course in the same college. Deva falls head over heels for Shruthi and tries to win her with the help of his friend and classmate, Steve. One day, Shruthi cheats and embarrasses Deva in the name of love, which hurts him very deeply. Later, she understands his love and proposes to him. After some time, he meets his childhood friend Ashok on the road and goes to his house. There, he meets Indhu, Ashok's fierce sister. He gets impressed with Indhu's voice and asks her to sing in his band. He tries to befriend Indhu, but she complains to the police that he is eve-teasing her. The police takes Deva to the police station and thrashes him. This makes Shruthi very angry, and she goes to Ashok's house and shouts at Indhu for her mannerless behaviour towards men and also her boyfriend. Ashok and Deva stop the argument between both the ladies. When Ashok realises that Shruthi is still angry, he opens up a story which reveals why Indhu behaves in such a way. Indhu is revealed to have been drugged and raped during her college tour. Thereafter, no one questions her about the bad incident any more.

To cheer Indhu up, Deva covertly brings Indhu's favourite singer, P. Susheela, to her home. Indhu is extremely happy to spend time with Susheela. After knowing that Deva was the one who did this, she apologises for her rude behaviour. By this time, Deva and Shruthi are going to be engaged. Deva invites his best friend Ranjith to the engagement and introduces his future wife to him. Deva points to Shruthi, but when Ranjith sees her, it turns out to be Indhu walking towards them. In a shocking turn of events, shocked informs Deva that he (Deva) was the one who raped Indhu. Ranjith narrates the troubling story, when his friends went to Kuttraalam. There, Ranjith's friends force Deva to drink beer and make him drunk enough to meet a call girl at room 21 in the same hotel. Indhu happened to be in the same hotel with her friends for her college tour. Deva mistakenly enters Indhu's room 11 when it was only her in the room alone. Deva mistakes her for the call girl and accidentally sleeps with her. When Ranjith comes looking for Deva, he sees him and Indhu in bed together.

After knowing this truth, Deva is guilty towards both Shruthi and Indhu. He decides not to marry Shruthi and says this to Ranjith. Ranjith, who wants Deva to be happy with his love, tells Ashok that he was the one who raped Indhu, and a fight ensues between them. Deva splits both of them up, saying that he was the one ruined Indhu's life. That night, Indhu confronts Deva and asks him to still marry Shruthi as she thinks it was just an accident between them. The next morning, just before Deva tying the auspicious thread on Shruthi, she stands up and asks him to stop acting. She says that she already knows that Deva was the one who raped Indhu through his unsent letters in Deva's room. She creates a havoc and refuses to marry Deva, and also embarrasses Indhu. Getting angry, Deva quickly marries Indhu. As he ties the thaali on Indhu, he looks at Shruthi where she smiles at him. It turns out to be Deva himself has told Shruthi about this incident and had asked her to act in such a way in the wedding the next day. She agrees to do so for Deva because of her love for him.

== Cast ==
- Prabhu Deva as Deva
- Kausalya as Indhu
- Gayatri Jayaraman as Shruthi
- Vadivelu as Steve Waugh from Canada, Mark Waugh, Mr.Waugh, and Mrs. Waugh
- Vivek as Valaiyapathi
- Ranjith as Ranjith
- Sriman as Ashok, Indhu's brother
- Shanthi Williams as Indhu and Ashok's mother
- Sharon as Burus, Valaiyapathi's and Steve's girlfriend
- Fathima Babu as Dr. Kamali
- Rajeev as Dr. R. K. Viswanath
- Pandu as Hostel Warden
- Kaka Radhakrishnan as Shruthi's grandfather
- Bayilvan Ranganathan as Rowdy Rangan
- Madhan Bob as Principal
- P. Susheela as Herself
- Siva (uncredited)

== Production ==
The film marked the directorial debut of R. D. Narayanamurthy who earlier assisted Kathir, G. M. Kumar and Raj Kapoor. The producers initially tried to cast Shilpa Shetty as the lead heroine, but Shetty refused as her previous pairing with Prabhu Deva in Mr. Romeo was a failure. Sonia Agarwal was rejected after make-up test and she was replaced by newcomer Gayatri Jayaraman. Priyanka Trivedi was also initially announced as being a part of the cast, though she was later replaced by Kausalya. The filming was held at Ooty.

== Soundtrack ==
The soundtrack, composed by Yuvan Shankar Raja was released on 22 September 2001 by Saregama. It features six tracks, lyrics were penned by Pa. Vijay and Kalai Kumar. The songs "All Day Jolly Day" and "Manja Kaattu Maina" were some of the most popular songs of 2001 and went on to become some of the chartbusters of that year.

Track listing
No.	Title	Lyrics	Singer(s)	Length
1.	"All Day Jolly Day"	Pa. Vijay	Shankar Mahadevan, Yuvan Shankar Raja	4:29
2.	"Azhagaana Sooriyan"	Pa. Vijay	Sujatha Mohan	4:20
3.	"Colour Colour"	Kalai Kumar	Chitra Sivaraman	5:37
4.	"Kutti Kutti Pani Thuliye"	Pa. Vijay	Sadhana Sargam	4:23
5.	"Manja Kaattu Maina"	V. Elango	Karthik, Sadhana Sargam	5:41
6.	"Sadugudugudu Aadathey"	Pa. Vijay	Hariharan, Bhavatharini	4:56
Total length:				26:21

== Release and reception ==
The film released on 14 November 2001. Tulika of Rediff.com wrote: "On paper, Manathai Thirudi Vittai seems to have everything going for it. Yet, somehow, it doesn't quite jell. For the most part, the film oscillates between the good and the merely banal". Visual Dasan of Kalki wrote the film, which should have been made in the lines of Kadhal Kottai, with a strong foundation of compelling plot, good climax and new visual settings, has been wasted by commercial aspects. Malathi Rangarajan of The Hindu gave a more positive review, citing, "Armed with a suspenseful story and a cohesive screenplay, director has come out with a fare that is reasonably appealing". Chennai Online wrote "The debutant director who showed promise in the first half, with some light, interesting moments in the love-scenes, and the hilarious comedy track of Vivek-Vadivelu, lets his script go haywire in the second half".

== Legacy ==
Over the years the film's comedy has been appreciated by many people. Vadivelu's character of Steve Waugh inspired countless memes and his rendition of "Singin' in the Rain" became popular. The dialogue "Give respect, take respect" is parodied by Ashwanth Ashokkumar in Thambi (2019).
