= School Master (2010 film) =

- Directed by: Dinesh Babu
- Written by: Dinesh Babu
- Produced by: C. R. Manohar
- Starring: Vishnuvardhan; Suhasini Maniratnam; Tara; Avinash; Mukesh Rishi
- Cinematography: Dinesh Babu
- Edited by: Narahalli Gnanesh
- Music by: V. Sridhar
- Production company: Golden Lion Films
- Release date: 22 January 2010
- Running time: 137 minutes
- Country: India
- Language: Kannada

School Master (Kannada: ಸ್ಕೂಲ್ ಮಾಸ್ಟರ್) is a 2010 Indian Kannada language political-drama film directed by Dinesh Babu and produced by C. R. Manohar. The film stars Vishnuvardhan and Suhasini Maniratnam teaming up with the director yet again after Suprabhatha (1988) and Hendthigeltheeni. Also in the cast are Tara, Avinash, Devaraj and Mukesh Rishi. V. Sridhar composed the music for the film while the cinematography is by the director himself.

Originally slated for a 2009 release, the film met with several delays and ultimately became a posthumous release of actor Vishnuvardhan. This was his 199th film as an actor. By December 2008, the filming portions were completed and Vishnuvardhan's dubbing took place just before his death.

The film was released on 22 January 2010 across Karnataka screens and opened to the mixed reviews from critics with Deccan Herald commenting that director Dinesh Babu failed in his direction and the film is "reduced to a sad commentary on the disconnect between filmmakers and contemporary audience taste". It turned out to be a box-office bomb.

== Plot ==
Master Jagannath (Vishnuvardhan) is a disciplined school teacher happily married to Meera (Suhasini). They both have a girl child named Meghana. Jagannath becomes the most favorite teacher among all the students for his unconditional love towards them. He is a close relative of the Home Minister (Avinash). His daughter is very close friends with the Minister's daughter Aditi. Meanwhile, an underworld don Appu (Mukesh Rishi) is under the captivity of the Government and his aids are in a rage to get him released. They hatch a plan to kidnap the Minister's daughter Aditi and demand the release of Appu. By mistake, they kidnap Jagannath's daughter Meghana and demand the release of Appu in exchange for Megahana. The emotional trauma undergone by Jagannath's family and the Minister's efforts in releasing the child from captivity form the rest of the story.

== Cast ==
- Vishnuvardhan as Master Jagannath
- Suhasini as Meera
- Avinash
- Mukesh Rishi as Appu
- Devaraj
- Tara
- Srinivasa Murthy
- Chitra Shenoy
- Baby Brunda
- Baby Prerana

== Production ==
In late 2008, director Dinesh Babu teamed up with C. R. Manohar of Golden Lion Film Division and roped in his favorite actor Vishnuvardhan in the lead role. He had titled the film as Master in the beginning. The film's story was said to be inspired by the English musical Making Way for Tomorrow. He also roped in Suhasini as the female lead. The trio had earlier worked in films like Suprabhatha and Hendthigeltheeni. The initial filming occurred at a brisk pace and a major part of the film had been shot by early 2009. However, due to some creative differences with the director, the film underwent several delays. By the time this film was released, two of Vishnuvardhan's other films found theatrical release. Finally, the film was released after Vishnuvardhan's demise and was considered his last release.

== Soundtrack ==
All the songs are composed and scored by V. Sridhar. The audio launch function presided by the Jhankar Music label was held on 10 January 2010 at the Le Meridian hotel, Bangalore. Since this happened post the demise of lead actor Vishnuvardhan, the producer invited all the top stars of the film industry to attend the event. Among the attendees were H. D. Kumaraswamy, Jayamala, Rockline Venkatesh, Sa. Ra. Govindu, K. Shivaramu and others.

Sl No	Song title	Singer(s)	Lyrics
1	"Chinnumari Pappumari"	S. P. Balasubrahmanyam, K. S. Chithra	V. Manohar
2	"Ee Lokavella Guruvu"	S. P. Balasubrahmanyam	Doddarangegowda
3	"Naguvalle Chellide"	S. P. Balasubrahmanyam	V. Sridhar
4	"Jananavu Maayeyu"	Madhu Balakrishnan	K. Kalyan
5	"Saara Saara"	Suchithra	Ram Narayan

== Reception ==
=== Critical response ===
A critic from The Times of India scored the film at 3 out of 5 stars and says "The director has failed to handle Suhasinis character properly, and the story is confusing till the end. Avinash, Devaraj, Dharma, and Tara have done a good job. V Sridhars music needs special mention". B S Srivani from Deccan Herald wrote "Vishnuvardhan as the school master offers some climax-time ‘gyaan’ to young students. By then, the screen gets obscured by people standing up and preparing to leave. ‘School Master’ is reduced to a sad commentary on the disconnect between filmmakers and contemporary audience taste". A critic from The New Indian Express wrote "As far as Vishnuvardhan’s performance is concerned, he is at his best. His performance in emotional sequences, especially where he collapses after seeing Meghana’s body or where he pleads Avinash not to repeat the word ‘body’, and another scene where he tries to convince Suhasini will make the audience reach for their handkerchiefs. Suhasini has not only acted well but also dances in this film". A critic from Bangalore Mirror wrote "Most of the second half of the film is a revenge drama where Jagannath uses his Kalaripayutu skills to eliminate the baddies. But the entire film stands on the sensitive interplay between the characters of Vishnuvardhan and Suhasini. And not for the first time, Vishnuvardhan overpowers all others with his act".
