= Kathi Kantha Rao =

- Poster
- Directed by: E. V. V. Satyanarayana
- Screenplay by: E. V. V. Satyanarayana
- Story by: Prasad Varma
- Produced by: Eedara Srinivasa Rao; Eedara Ravikumar; Eedupuganti Purnachandra Rao; Eedupuganti Subramanyeshwar Rao
- Starring: Allari Naresh; Kamna Jethmalani
- Cinematography: Adusumilli Vijay Kumar
- Edited by: Gautham Raju
- Music by: Mallikarjun
- Production company: Big B Productions
- Release date: 10 December 2010
- Country: India
- Language: Telugu

Kathi Kantha Rao is a 2010 Indian Telugu-language comedy film written and directed by E. V. V. Satyanarayana and produced by Eedara Srinivasa Rao, Eedara Ravikumar, Eedupuganti Subramanyeshwar Rao, and Eedupuganti Purnachandra Rao under Big B Productions banner. The film stars Allari Naresh and Kamna Jethmalani in lead roles. The film soundtrack was composed by Mallikarjun with cinematography by Adusumilli Vijay Kumar and editing by Gautham Raju. The dialogues and story for the film were written by popular writer Prasad Varma. The film released on 10 December 2010 to positive reviews and went to become a commercial success at the box office. This was Satyanarayana's last film as a director before his death in 2011.

== Plot ==
Kathi Kantharao (Allari Naresh) is the son of a suspended gunman (Dharmavarapu Subramanyam). He is a police constable with two married sisters and another two sisters who are ready for marriage. He has to fulfill the desires of his two greedy brothers-in-law (Krishna Bhagavaan and Srinivasa Reddy) and also search for grooms for his younger sisters. The whole family burden rests on his shoulders. He also signs an agreement with his father stating that he will not marry until his sisters are happily settled in life. However, he deviates from the agreement by falling in love and eventually marrying a girl named Rathnam (Kamna Jethmalani). He decides to keep it a secret until he fulfills the word given to his father. Due to unexpected circumstances, he reveals his relationship with Rathnam to his boss and Sub-Inspector Kanakaratnam (Jeeva).

In the meantime, one of his sisters falls in love with the son of IG G.K. Rayudu's (Chalapathi Rao), while another loves a constable and Katha Rao's friend Vaasu (Venu Madhav). Kantha Rao manages to settle the marriage of his two younger sisters with the people they love. Kanakaratnam, in order to clear the doubts he has about their relationship, goes to Rathnam's hometown Vengalappagudem to meet with her father Ringu Raja Rao (Kota Srinivasa Rao). Raja Rao, learning about the marriage from Kanakaratnam, goes to Hyderabad to confront his daughter. Kanta Rao manages to reveal the truth to Raja Rao and promises to remarry her with the blessings of his entire family. Raja Rao wants to become the sarpanch of a village and does all kinds of nonsense to appease the voters. As his opponent Lanka Satish's (Ahuti Prasad) son (Nalla Srinu) marries a foreigner, Raja Rao takes advantage and criticizes their entire family for his political gain.

After a few days, Kanta Rao convinces his parents and sisters, makes arrangements for his younger sister's marriage, and marries Rathnam. However, after the first night, Rathnam unintentionally reveals that she is pregnant. Satish learns about Rathnam's pregnancy and defames Raja Rao so that he can win the village elections. With this, Raja Rao's winning chances as sarpanch turn bleak, and he is faced with the dilemma of finding a solution to this critical situation. Kantha Rao faces many troubles and finally solves all his problems and also helps Raja Rao win the village elections.

== Cast ==
- Allari Naresh as Katti Kantha Rao
- Kamna Jethmalani as Rathnam
- Kota Srinivasa Rao as Ringu Raja Rao
- Dharmavarapu Subramanyam as Katti Pulla Rao
- Ali as Blade Babji
- Priya as Kantha Rao's sister
- Krishna Bhagavaan as Kantha Rao's brother-in-law
- Srinivasa Reddy as Kantha Rao's brother-in-law
- Ahuti Prasad as Lanka Satish
- L. B. Sriram as Marriage Broker
- Venu Madhav as Vaasu
- Jeeva as Sub-Inspector Kanakaratnam
- Chalapathi Rao as Inspector General GK Rayudu
- Raghu Babu as Rao Gopal Sharma
- Duvvasi Mohan as Constable
- Kondavalasa Lakshmana Rao as Vaasu's father
- Dhanraj as Ringu Raja Rao's servant
- Venu Yeldandi as Nalla Sreenu
- Sandhya Janak

== Soundtrack ==
The soundtrack was composed by singer Mallikarjun in his debut as composer. Ramajogayya Sastry penned 5 of the 6 songs in the movie while lyricist Vanamali penned the remaining one song.

Track listing
No.	Title	Lyrics	Singer(s)	Length
1.	"Katti Katti Kantarao"	Ramajogayya Sastry	Mallikarjun	1:47
2.	"Warewa What A Figure"	Ramajogayya Sastry	Hemachandra, Malavika	3:57
3.	"Kattilantodu"	Ramajogayya Sastry	Tippu, Gopika Poornima	3:52
4.	"Osenaa Rowdi Pilla"	Vanamali	Ranjith, Rita Thyagarajan	4:17
5.	"Tam Tam Padatham"	Ramajogayya Sastry	Geetha Madhuri, Uma Neha	3:19
6.	"Chillaka Mahalashmi"	Ramajogayya Sastry	Geetha Madhuri, Uma Neha	3:53

== Reception ==
NDTV gave a good review for the film and said the film can be watched only for sheer entertainment value. Jeevi from Idlebrain.com gave the film 3.0 of 5 rating and commented that the film was an EVV brand comedy flick. Radhika Rajamani from Rediff.com gave the film 2 stars out of 5 and said that the film was an average time-pass entertainer.
