= Idhe Maa Katha =

2021 film directed by Guru Pawan

- Theatrical release poster
- Directed by: Guru Pawan
- Screenplay by: Guru Pawan
- Produced by: Golla Mahesh
- Starring: Srikanth; Sumanth Ashwin; Bhumika Chawla; Tanya Hope
- Cinematography: C. Ramprasad
- Edited by: Junaid Siddiqui
- Music by: Sunil Kashyap
- Production company: Gurappa Parameswara Productions
- Release date: 2 October 2021
- Running time: 143 minutes
- Country: India
- Language: Telugu

Idhe Maa Katha (transl. This is my story) is a 2021 Indian Telugu-language drama film written and directed by Guru Pawan, produced by Golla Mahesh through Gurrappa Parameswara Productions. The film has an ensemble cast of Srikanth, Sumanth Ashwin, Bhumika Chawla, and Tanya Hope. The film is depicted as a road-trip. It was released on 2 October 2021.

== Cast ==
- Srikanth as Mahendra
- Sumanth Ashwin as Ajay
- Bhumika Chawla as Lakshmi
- Tanya Hope as Meghana
- Saptagiri
- Subbaraju
- Prudhvi Raj
- Sameer
- Ram Prasad
- Badram
- Srijita Ghosh
- Sandhya Janak
- Madhumani

== Production ==
Principal photography of the film was done in early 2020. The film's production was halted due to COVID-19 pandemic in March 2020 and in November 2020, the shooting of the film resumed, following the relaxation of COVID-19 lockdown in India.

== Release and reception ==
The film received mixed reviews from critics with The Times of India calling it "A biker film that’s neither adventurous nor engaging". The film was a commercial failure.
