= Ranga The Donga =

- Film poster
- Directed by: G. V. Sudhakar Naidu
- Written by: Madan
- Produced by: C. R. Manohar
- Starring: Srikanth; Ramya Krishna; Vimala Raman
- Cinematography: Poornakandru
- Edited by: Gautham Raju
- Music by: Chakri
- Release date: 30 December 2010
- Running time: 124 minutes
- Country: India
- Language: Telugu

Ranga The Donga (transl. Ranga the thief) is a 2010 Indian Telugu-language action drama film directed by G. V. Sudhakar Naidu. It stars Srikanth, Ramya Krishna and Vimala Raman. The film was released on 30 December 2010.

== Plot ==
Ranga (Srikanth) is a thief who lives in Stuart Nagar. He was raised by his grandmother (Sakuntala) in her house. He used to steal from corrupt police officers because they could not file a complaint for the theft of money from their own houses. He would steal money and valuables by spraying a sedative called chloroform in their houses. He would also steal the stars on their police uniforms to prove that the individual is unworthy of the stars on their shoulders. Ranga is a fan of faction-oriented films, and dreams of acting like one of those faction leaders. At the same time, he falls in love with a sub-inspector, Mangamma (Vimala Raman). At one point, Ranga and friends try to rob the police commissioner's (Nagendra Babu) house, but are caught. While they were at court, Ranga meets a real faction leader, Bhavani Prasad (Srikanth). Bhavani's rival attacks him severely, leading to his death. However, noticing that Ranga looks exactly like Bhavani, the latter's wife (Ramya Krishnan) convinces him to take her late husband's place to prove to everyone that he indeed is alive. Ranga realizes that he is in reality Bhavani Prasad's own brother, and is happy that he was finally able to act like a real faction leader.

== Cast ==
- Srikanth as Ranga / Bhavani Prasad
- Ramya Krishna as Bhavani Prasad's wife
- Vimala Raman as Inspector Mangamma
- Telangana Shakuntala
- G. V. Sudhakar Naidu
- Jaya Prakash Reddy
- Nagendra Babu as Police Commissioner
- Chitram Srinu
- Jyothi
- Bhuvaneswari
- Sakshi Shivanand
- Suman Setty
- Chalapathi Rao
- Tirupathi Prakash
- Sivaji Raja

== Production ==
Srikanth plays a thief while Vimala Raman plays a police officer.

== Soundtrack ==
No.	Title	Singer(s)	Length
1.	"Ventaadi Singamala"	Chakri
2.	"Gicchi Gicchi Vesthu"	Chakri, Malavika
3.	"Naa Volle"	Chakri, Vijaya Lakshmi
4.	"O Meenatchi"	Adarshini, Simha
5.	"Manasa Manasa Thondara"	Kousalya
