= Mahatma (film) =

- Directed by: Krishna Vamsi
- Written by: Paruchuri brothers (dialogues)
- Screenplay by: Krishna Vamsi
- Story by: Krishna Vamsi
- Produced by: C R Manohar
- Starring: Srikanth; Bhavana
- Cinematography: Sharat
- Edited by: Gautham Raju
- Music by: Vijay Antony
- Distributed by: Golden Lion Films
- Release date: 9 October 2009
- Country: India
- Language: Telugu
- Budget: ₹12 crores
- Box office: ₹10 crore distributors' share

Mahatma is a 2009 Indian Telugu-language action drama film co-written and directed by Krishna Vamsi. This film stars Srikanth (in his 100th film) and Bhavana. The music was composed by Vijay Antony with cinematography by Sharat and editing by Gautham Raju.

The film was released on 9 October 2009. The film was dubbed in Tamil as Puthiya Thalapathy and in Hindi as Ek Aur Mahanayak in 2009. The film won four Nandi Awards and was a box-office success.

== Plot ==
Dasu (Srikanth) is a rowdy in a slum in Hyderabad. He makes a living out of "settlement of petty issues". A young lawyer named Krishnaveni (Bhavana) gets him bail in a petty case, and their acquaintance soon develops into romance after a series of events. On the other hand, a politician-cum-businesswoman (Jyothi) plans to set up SEZ in that slum, which is protested by dwellers headed by a genuine leader (Sekhar). Meanwhile, a local politician-cum-old rowdy leader named Dada (Jaya Prakash Reddy) also protests against the businesswoman and seeks Rs. 200 crores if she wants to set up SEZ there. Dasu initially believes Dada is a good politician and works for him. Dada's son assassinates a competitor, which lands him in prison for murder, and whilst party members meet for the upcoming election, it is revealed that Dada's stronghold area is divided into 2, and the other part is given to a new contender as Dada's son is in jail. This infuriates Dada, and they hatch a plan to use Dasu as a scapegoat in place of Dada's son, where Dasu opposes Dada and plans to contest against him on a newly floated Mahatma party. Later, due to a few crucial incidents, Dasu turns into a proper Gandhi follower and has unanimous and tremendous support from local dwellers as he stands with them to protest against the fab city contract, thereby pulling off Dada's seat and deciding to give it to Dasu for his following. However, a plan is hatched by Dada to grab what is his, as he wants his children to attempt an assassination on him, accuse Dasu of it, and take the seat back by contesting independently. On the other hand, Kala Rani makes Das's best friend her accomplice and poisons Das. Dada's plan backfires when his children plan to kill him for real and take over both the divided parts of their area, which is heard by Dada. He calls Dasu for help, and Dasu arrives and saves Dada, and all the perpetrators are arrested. Dada nominates Dasu as the MLA, but Dasu, in turn, gives it to Shekar as he feels that he is a true leader.

== Cast ==
- Srikanth as Dasu
- Bhavana as Krishnaveni “Krishna”, Dasu’s wife
- Brahmanandam as English Professor
- Jaya Prakash Reddy as Dada
- Jyothi as Politician/Businesswoman
- Paruchuri Gopala Krishna as Advocate
- Chatrapathi Sekhar as Leader of Dwellers
- Ahuti Prasad as Inspector B. K.
- Sampoornesh Babu as Protester
- Duvvasi Mohan
- Ramesh as Drunkard
- Uttej as Rehman
- Ramjagan as Bellary
- Charmee Kaur as an item number

== Production ==
The muhurat for the film took place on 15 February 2009. Mahatma marked Srikanth's 100th film. He planned to work with Krishna Vamsi for two years. Although Srikanth's market had gone down, his friend C R Manohar agreed to produce the film on a bigger budget than his previous films. To prepare for the film, Krishna Vamsi read several books and watched films about Mahatma Gandhi.

== Soundtrack ==
Mahatma

Soundtrack album by Vijay Antony
- Released: 2009
- Genre: Feature film soundtrack
- Language: Telugu

Vijay Antony chronology
| Ninaithale Inikkum (2009) | Mahatma (2009) | Vettaikaaran (2009) |

The music is composed by Vijay Antony. The audio launch was held on 21 September 2009 with Mahatma Gandhi's great-grandson Tushar Gandhi attending the event.

The song "Yem Jaruguthundi" was based on the song "Aen Ennaku Mayakkam" from the movie Naan Avanillai. Similarly, "Jajjanaka" was based on the song "Naaka Mukka" from the movie Kadhalil Vizhunthen and the song "Dailamo" from the namesake song from the film Dishyum.

Track list
| No. | Title | Lyrics | Singer(s) | Length |
|---|---|---|---|---|
| 1. | "Indiramma" | Sirivennela Seetharama Sastry | S. P. Balasubrahmanyam | 4:52 |
| 2. | "Yem Jaruguthundi" | Sirivennela Seetharama Sastry | Karthik, Sangeetha | 5:07 |
| 3. | "Kurra Kurra" | Suddala Ashok Teja | Vijay Antony, Surchith, Vinaya | 4:23 |
| 4. | "Thalayetthi" | Sirivennela Seetharama Sastry | S. P. Balasubrahmanyam | 3:22 |
| 5. | "Jajjanaka" | Lakshmi Bhoopal | Vijay Antony | 4:59 |
| 6. | "Dailamo" | Sirivennela Seetharama Sastry | Balaji, Sangeetha, Megha | 4:28 |
| 7. | "Neela Poori" | Kasarla Shyam | Kasarla Shyam | 3:36 |
| Total length: | | | | 30:50 |

== Release ==
The film was to be released on 2 October, coinciding with Gandhi Jayanti. Due to censorship issues, the film's release was postponed by a week to 9 October 2009.

== Reception ==
A critic from Rediff.com wrote that "Mahatma, in a way brings back the father of the nation and Gandhism. However, it is pretty verbose and preachy filled with lot of rhetoric too in parts". Jeevi of Idlebrain.com wrote that "Vamsi is known for treading the forbidden areas of typical commercial cinema. Selecting the subject of Gandhi also explains his noble intentions".

== Awards ==
Nandi Awards - 2009

- Best Supporting Actor - Ramjagan
- Best Male Playback Singer - S. P. Balasubrahmanyam
- Special Jury Award for Best Performance - Srikanth
- Best Female Dubbing Artist - Soumya

== See also ==
- List of artistic depictions of Mohandas Karamchand Gandhi
