= Padutha Theeyaga =

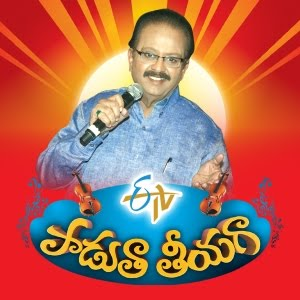
- Title with the host S. P. Balasubrahmanyam
- Genre: Reality-singing
- Directed by: N. B. Sasthri
- Presented by: S. P. Balasubrahmanyam (1996 - 2000, 2007 - 2020); S. P. Charan (2021 - present)
- Judges: S. P. Balasubrahmanyam (1996 - 2020); Chandrabose (2021 - present); Sunitha Upadrashta (2021 - present); Vijay Prakash
- Country of origin: India
- Original language: Telugu
- No. of seasons: 23 (including old series)
- No. of episodes: 1,102

Production
- Executive producer: Surabhi Shekar
- Producers: Ramoji Rao; S. P. Balasubrahmanyam
- Production locations: Andhra Pradesh, India - (Old Series - 1&2) (Series - 1-6) (series - 12-18); United States- (series - 7,8,9,11)
- Camera setup: Multi-camera
- Running time: 60 minutes
- Production company: Ramoji Group

Original release
- Network: ETV
- Release: 12 January 1996 – present

Related
- Padutha Theeyaga Youth Series

Padutha Theeyaga (transl: I will sing sweetly) is an Indian Telugu-language Reality television singing show that is aired on ETV Telugu, a channel of ETV Network, a part of Ramoji Group. The program seeks to discover the best singing talent in Telugu language. The show used to be hosted by S. P. Balasubrahmanyam, a legendary Playback singer from the state of Andhra Pradesh, India.

It is the first of its kind in South India. The main objective of this program is to bring out emerging singing talent into spotlight. Started in the year 1996 "Padutha Theeyaga" has so far completed more than 1100 episodes.

It helped identify and establish singers such as Mallikarjun, Usha, Smitha, Karunya, Hemachandra, Gopika Poornima, Kousalya, Venu, Geetha Madhuri, Malavika, Anjana Soumya, Parthasaradhi, Sandip, Madhavi Bhamidipati, Nitya Santhoshini, Sandeep Kurapati, Sri Sivathmika Medicherla and many more.

== Overview ==
The program was first started in 1996 and continued till 2000 with 4 successful seasons. Again in 2007 the show restarted with new format and it continued till 20 September 2020; due to the unfortunate death of S. P. Balasubrahmanyam, it was discontinued. However, from 27 September 2020, the Grand finale episodes of all seasons of the show were aired on the title of "Alanati Apurupalu". On 4 June 2021 an announcement was made, saying that the show will be hosted by S. P. Charan and will be judged by Chandrabose, Sunitha Upadrashta and Vijay Prakash. The new series debuted on ETV on 5 December 2021.

== Old series 1 (1996) ==
Top 4 Contestants:-

Name	Placement
Singer Usha	Winner Women Category
Parthu	Winner Men Category
Komanduri Ramachari	Runner Men Category
Mishma	Runner Women Category

== Old Series 2 (Junior 1998) ==
Top 4 Contestants:-

Name	Placement
Malavika	Winner Girls Category
N. C. Karunya	Winner Boys Category
Pavan Sesha	Runner Boys Category
Anjana Sowmya	Runner Girls Category

== Series 1 (2007) ==
Padutha Theeyaga
- Season 1
- Presented by: S. P. Balasubrahmanyam
- No. of contestants: 30
- Winner: Rajesh Kumar
- Runner-up: Lipsika
- No. of episodes: 47

Release
- Original network: ETV Network
- Original release: 2007

The program was restarted again in 2007 with new format it was for adult contestants. They selected 3 or 2 singers from each district of United Andhra Pradesh and gave voice of the district title to one among them and started the series with voice of the district title holders. Rajesh Kumar from Ananthapur and Lipsika from Khammam shared the first two places. Finals was judged by S. P. Balasubrahmanyam and guest judge was Devi Sri Prasad. Megastar Chiranjeevi made a special appearance in the finals and gave prizes to the contestants. The Grand Finale was conducted in Visakhapatnam. Winner Rajesh Kumar won Cash prize of Rs.10,00,000 and runner Lipsika won Rs.5,00,000. The prize money was sponsored by Suvarna Bhoomi. Grand finals was completed on 18 October 2007.

== Series 2 (2008) ==
Padutha Theeyaga
- Season 2
- No. of episodes: 27

Release
- Original network: ETV Network
- Original release: 2008
- Presented by: S. P. Balasubrahmanyam
- No. of contestants: 25
- Winner: Laksmi Meghana
- Runner-up: Anjani Nikhila

This season was for the junior contestants with Lakshmi Meghana, Ganesh Revanth, Anjani Nikhila, Raghawendra as finalists.Lakshmi Meghana is the winner.

== Series 3 (2008) ==
Padutha Theeyaga
- Season 3
- No. of episodes: 27

Release
- Original network: ETV Network
- Original release: 2008
- Presented by: S. P. Balasubrahmanyam
- No. of contestants: 25
- Winner: Sai Ramya
- Runner-up: Damini

This season was sponsored by EXO-Dishwash. In this season, Sairamya got first prize., Damini got second prize, and Sarathchandra Kalahasti and Nuthana got equal marks and the two were equally given third place.

== Series 4 (2009) ==
Padutha Theeyaga
- Season 4
- No. of episodes: 32

Release
- Original network: ETV Network
- Original release: 2009
- Presented by: S. P. Balasubrahmanyam
- No. of contestants: 28
- Winner: Harini
- Runner-up: Tejaswini

This season was also for the adult contestants. Ivaturi Harini, Nandibhatla Tejaswini, Rohit and Sai Charan were the finalists and these contestants stood in the first, second and the third places respectively and the third place was shared by Rohit and Sai Charan together.

== Series 5 (August 2012 - January 2013) ==
Padutha Theeyaga
- Season 5
- No. of episodes: 29

Release
- Original network: ETV Network
- Original release: September 2012 – January 2013
- Presented by: S. P. Balasubrahmanyam
- No. of contestants: 19
- Winner: Praveen Kumar
- Runner-up: Charumathi Pallavi

This season had Sharath Santosh, Surya Karthik, Praveen kumar and Charumathi Pallavi as the finalists. Out of them Praveen was the first, followed by Charumathi Pallavi, Sharath and Karthik in that order. The season 5 finale had the famous drummer Sivamani as the chief guest. Even this season was for adults.

== Series 6 (February 2013 - July 2013) ==
Padutha Theeyaga
- Season 6
- No. of episodes: 25

Release
- Original network: ETV Network
- Original release: 11 February – 29 July 2013
- Presented by: S. P. Balasubrahmanyam
- No. of contestants: 20
- Winner: Parameswara Rao
- Runner-up: Srilalitha bhamidipati

Had kids of age 6–15.The winner was Parameshwara Rao.

== Series 7 (August 2013 - March 2014) ==
Padutha Theeyaga
- Season 7
- No. of episodes: 31

Release
- Original network: ETV Network
- Original release: 5 August 2013 – 3 March 2014
- Presented by: S. P. Balasubrahmanyam
- No. of contestants: 23
- Winner: Arjun Adapalli
- Runner-up: Vamsi Priya

Was held at USA. The winner was Arjun Addepalli.

== Series 8 (March 2014 - October 2014) ==
Padutha Theeyaga
- Season 8
- No. of episodes: 34

Release
- Original network: ETV Network
- Original release: 10 March – 27 October 2014
- Presented by: S. P. Balasubrahmanyam
- No. of contestants: 20
- Winner: K.S.Abhiram
- Runner-up: Sarvepalli Shreya

Was for children of age 9–14. The winner was K.S. Abhiram. The second position was occupied by Sarvepalli Sreya, the third Geethika and fourth Maanya Chandran.

== Series 9 (November 2014 - June 2015) ==
Padutha Theeyaga
- Season 9
- No. of episodes: 34

Release
- Original network: ETV Network
- Original release: 3 November 2014 – 1 June 2015
- Presented by: S. P. Balasubrahmanyam
- No. of contestants: 20
- Winner: Pothukuchi Meghana
- Runner-up: Mokkala Sneha

It was also in USA, and was for ages 9–13. All participants were females. The final 4 were Meghana Pothukuchi (the winner), Sneha Mokkala (second place), Vishnupriya Kothamasu (third place), and Nikhitha Pathapati (fourth place)

2015 Paadutha Theeyaga Selections Process

- 15 February 2015: Last Date for submitting Audition Songs(1 Classical style and 1 Fast Beat)
- 28 February 2015: An email sent from PT team stating that the entries had been received and sent to Balu garu for finalizing the list of 21 contestants
- 13 April 2015: Notifications to the final 21 contestants sent
- 15 April 2015: Requested Copy of Birth Certificate from the finalists
- 25 April 2015: Confirmation email sent
- 12 May 2015: Sent a list of 13 songs which would cover 24 episodes to each participant. Next batch of 6-7 songs will be given in the second week of July.
- 16 May 2015: Request sent to participants for full details (Full Name, City, State)
- 12–17 May 2015: Lyrics requested for all the songs from participants. PT team corrected them and emailed back
- 29 May-6 June 2015: Half-hour Skype training sessions offered by PT team for the first four songs in the list. Training involves only fine tuning and pitch setting.

== Series 10 (June 2015 - March 2016) ==
Vamsi, Priya, Sai Jagadhatri, Shivani and Swathi are all winners.

== Series 11 (March 2016 - October 2016) ==
Was in the US, and was for ages 13–16. Participants consisted of 15 females and 2 males. The final five were Akhila Mamandur (Winner, $10,000) from Houston, TX; Abhijith Vemulapati (Runner-up, $5,000) from Woodland, CA; Bhavna Ravichandran (Finalist, $2,500) from Greensboro, NC; Supraja Kadagandla (Finalist, $2,500) from Olympia, WA; and Priya Kanajam (Pre-Finalist, $1300) from Minneapolis, MN.

== Series 12 (2017) ==
Top 18 Contestants:-

Name	Hometown	Placement
Sugandhini	Nellore	Winner
Nada priya	Nellore	1st Runner up
Ganesh	Hyderabad	2nd runner up
Sai Harika	Kurnool	3rd runner up
Haripriya	West Godavari	Eliminated 14th
Hima bindu	Hyderabad	Eliminated 13th
Lakshmi Bhavaja	Hyderabad	Eliminated 12th
Sai Madhav	Mancherial	Eliminated 11th
Swetha	East Godavari	Eliminated 10th
Saikiran	Hyderabad	Eliminated 9th
Aishwarya	Hyderabad	Eliminated 8th
Laxmi Shravani	Hyderabad	Eliminated 7th
Sudeshna	Hyderabad	Eliminated 6th
Ashwini	Hyderabad	Eliminated 5th
Babitha	Hyderabad	Eliminated 4th
Varshini	Hyderabad	Eliminated 3rd
Ramani	Vijayanagaram	Eliminated 2nd
Bhuvana kruthi	Hyderabad	Eliminated 1st

== Series 13 (2017) ==
Top 18 Contestants:-

Name	Hometown	Placement
Chodavarapu Jahnavi	Nagpur	Winner
Attaluri Pravasthi	Chennai	1st Runner up
Kovvuri Vaishnavi	Hyderabad	2nd runner up
Jonnalagadda Srikar	Hyderabad	3rd runner up
Naseeruddin	Tadepalligudem	Eliminated 14th
Sri Vaishnavi	Mangalagiri	Eliminated 13th
Sandeep	Hyderabad	Eliminated 12th
Drishya Sajan	Nellore	Eliminated 11th
Lasya	Nagpur	Eliminated 10th
Srishanth	Anantapuram	Eliminated 9th
Shiva Keerthana	Vijayawada	Eliminated 8th
Karthikeya	Hyderabad	Eliminated 7th
Yogitha	Kharagpur	Eliminated 6th
Vijay kumar	Visakhapatnam	Eliminated 5th
Rohith	Visakhapatnam	Eliminated 4th
Jyothirmayi	Hyderabad	Eliminated 3rd
Naimisha sri	Visakhapatnam	Eliminated 2nd
Sri Dhruthi	Hyderabad	Eliminated 1st

== Series 14 (2018) ==
Top 18 Contestants:-

Name	Hometown	Placement
Sree Purnima		Winner
Sivakumar		Runner up
Yashaswi		Second runner up
Sudhanjali	Annavaram	Eliminated 15th
Srivani		Eliminated 14th
Rahul Sai		Eliminated 13th
Vaidehi		Eliminated 12th
Saika Birwal		Eliminated 11th
Renukumar		Eliminated 10th
Srivatsava		Eliminated 9th
Pranav Sai		Eliminated 8th
Snigdha		Eliminated 7th
Yashwanth		Eliminated 6th
Aishwarya		Eliminated 5th
Suhitha		Eliminated 4th
Sri Manasa		Eliminated 3rd
Sri Sahithi		Eliminated 2nd
Prathyusha		Eliminated 1st

== Series 15 (2018) ==
Top 18 Contestants:-

Name	Hometown	Placement
Dheeraj	Visakhapatnam	Winner
Ayyan Pranathi	Visakhapatnam	Winner
Kaushika	Hyderabad	Winner
Harika	Hyderabad	Eliminated 15th
Samyuktha	Hyderabad	Eliminated 14th
Harsha Sri	Hyderabad	Eliminated 13th
Vardhan	Visakhapatnam	Eliminated 12th
Reshma	Vijayanagaram	Eliminated 11th
Munidilish Sai Kumar	Srikalahasti	Eliminated 10th
Shravani	Visakhapatnam	Eliminated 9th
Ananya	Hyderabad	Eliminated 8th
Sanjana	Visakhapatnam	Eliminated 7th
Sharvani	Peddapurram	Eliminated 6th
Bhoomika	Visakhapatnam	Eliminated 5th
Raghava Sharma	Warangal	Eliminated 4th
Karthikeya	Hyderabad	Eliminated 3rd
Pranay	Nellore	Eliminated 2nd
Jashwanth Naidu	Hyderabad	Eliminated 1st

== Series 16 (2019) ==
Top 18 Contestants:-

Name	Hometown	Placement
Akshya Sai		Winner
Jahnavi		Runner up
Charan		Second runner up
Himaja		Eliminated 15th
Swaraja		Eliminated 14th
Akhileshwar		Eliminated 13th
Ravi Kumar		Eliminated 12th
Sai Prasad		Eliminated 11th
Harish		Eliminated 10th
Dhanasri		Eliminated 9th
Shanmukha		Eliminated 8th
Srivalli		Eliminated 7th
Srivani		Eliminated 6th
Pragnya		Eliminated 5th
Abhishek		Eliminated 4th
Rashmi		Eliminated 3rd
Supradeep Reddy		Eliminated 2nd
Uday Shankar		Eliminated 1st

== Series 17 (2019) ==
From this season the program telecasting time was changed from 9:30 PM Sunday to 11:00AM Sunday.

Top 13 Contestants:-

Name	Hometown	Placement
Laxmi Srivalli	Bheemavaram	Winner
Lekhya	Hyderabad	Runner-up
Nagaram Sruthi	Hyderabad	2nd Runner-up
Harshitha Kancharana	Palasa	3rd Runner-up
Sai shreya	Pune	Eliminated 9th
Indu madhuri	Nellore	Eliminated 8th
Geetha mahathi	Hyderabad	Eliminated 7th
Poluri Neha	Hyderabad	Eliminated 6th
Koushik	Vijayawada	Eliminated 5th
Nithin Mani	Hyderabad	Eliminated 4th
Rudraksh Tigulla	Hyderabad	Eliminated 3rd
Prudvi Manoj Kumar	Guntur	Eliminated 2nd
Srinidhi	Vijayawada	Eliminated 1st

== Series 18 (2020) ==
Padutha Theeyaga
- Season 18
- Presented by: S. P. Balasubrahmanyam
- No. of contestants: 20
- Winner: Harshita PVSL
- Runner-up: M.K. Mounika
- No. of episodes: 34

Release
- Original network: ETV Network
- Original release: 1 March – 18 September 2020

Top 18 Contestants:-

Name	Hometown	Placement
Harshita PVSL	Visakhapatnam	Winner
M.K Mounika	Machilipatnam	1st Runner up
Shanthi	Kurnool	2nd runner up
Vaishnavi	Hyderabad	3rd runner up
Lakshmi Himasri	Nalgonda	Eliminated 14th
Lahari Sampatthika Ainnapurapu	Hyderabad	Eliminated 13th
Sai Sandeep Pakki	Visakhapatnam	Eliminated 12th
Keerthi	Srikakulam	Eliminated 11th
Dr.Yashaswini	Hyderabad	Eliminated 10th
Reddappa Chary	Tirupati	Eliminated 9th
Sravya	Hyderabad	Eliminated 8th
Balakrishnan Nair	Jangaon	Eliminated 7th
Kirankumar	Vijayanagaram	Eliminated 6th
Subbalakshmi	Vijayanagaram	Eliminated 5th
Srinija	Hyderabad	Eliminated 4th
Veera Swami	Vijayanagaram	Eliminated 3rd
Uma Krishna	Hyderabad	Eliminated 2nd
Sai Divya	Tirupati	Eliminated 1st

== Padutha Theeyaga Finalists ==
Seasons	Winner	Second place	Third Place	Fourth Place	Prefinalist
Season 1	Rajesh Kumar	Lipsika	Mallika	Sabiha	N/A
Season 2	Lakshmi Meghana	Anjani Nikhila	Ganesh Revanth	Ragavendhra	N/A
Season 3	Sai Ramya	Damini	Nuthana	Sharath Chandra	Lahari
Season 4	Harini	Tejaswini	Sai Charan	Rohit	N/A
Season 5	Praveen Kumar	Charumathi Pallavi	Sharath Santosh	Surya Karthik	Shashank Yeleswarapu
Season 6	Parameswara Rao	SriLalitha Bhamidipati	Sudheep	Shanmukha Priya	Sahiti Chaganti
Season 7 (USA)	Arjun Adapalli	Vamsi Priya	Udaya Bindu	Manisha Eerabathini	N/A
Season 8	K.S. Abhiram	Sarvepalli Shreya	Bhavyasree Geethika	Maanya Chandran	Sriram Charan
Season 9 (USA)	Meghana Pothukuchi	Sneha Mokkala	Sri Vishnu Priya Kothamasu	Nikitha Pathapati	Sumedha Vadlapudi
Season 10	Priya	Swathi	Sai Jagadhathri Vamsidhar	Shivani	N/A
Season 11 (USA)	Akhila Mamandur	Abhijit Vemulapati	Bhavna Ravichandran	Supraja Kadagandla	Priya Kanajam
Season 12	Sugandhini	Nadapriya	Ganesh	Sai Harika	N/A
Season 13	Chodavarapu Jahnavi	Attaluri Pravasthi	Kovvuri Vaishnavi	Jonnalagadda Srikar	N/A
Season 14	Sri Poornima	Siva Kumar	Yashaswy	N/A	N/A
Season 15	Dheeraj	Pranathi	Kaushika	N/A	Samyuktha
Season 16	Akshaya Sai	Jahnavi	Charan	N/A	Himaja
Season 17	Lakshmi Srivalli	Lekhya	Nagaram Sruthi	Kancharana Harshitha	Sai Shreya
Season 18	Harshitha	Mounika	Shanthi	Vaishnavi	Lakshmi Himasri
Season 19	Gayatri	Kushal	Supriya	Hitesh	
Season 20	Saarthak	Keerthana	Asrith Raghava		
Season 21	Shruthi	Krishna Chaitanya	Pavitra		
Season 22	K Sahasra	Yagapriya	Naga Vaishnavi		
