= Objection, My Lord! =

- Genre: Courtroom drama; Mystery
- Written by: Raj Kumar Akella; Suryaa; Santhosh Ayyappan; Sooriya Prathap.S
- Directed by: Santhosh Ayyappan
- Starring: Srikanth; Mukesh Rishi; Ananya Sharma; Snehal Kamat; Sameer
- Composer: Aruun Chiluveru
- Country of origin: India
- Original language: Telugu
- No. of episodes: 7

Production
- Producer: Raj Kumar Akella
- Cinematography: Suryaa
- Editor: Sai Kishore Kornani
- Production company: Dream House Productions

Original release
- Network: ZEE5
- Release: 31 July 2026

Objection, My Lord! (also promoted as Objection My Lord – Notary Parasuram Chapter 1) is a 2026 Indian Telugu-language courtroom drama web series directed by Santhosh Ayyappan. It stars Srikanth as a lawyer who returns to the courtroom after years away from legal practice, alongside Mukesh Rishi, Ananya Sharma, Snehal Kamat and Sameer. The seven-episode series premiered on ZEE5 on 31 July 2026. The series is a remake of Tamil-language web series Sattamum Neethiyum which premiered on Zee5 on 16 July 2025.

== Plot ==
A man named Narayana sets himself on fire outside a court after failing to get a police and legal response to his daughter Sameera's disappearance. The case draws the attention of Parashuram, a notary public and former lawyer who withdrew from courtroom practice after an earlier professional setback. Along with junior lawyer Vedha, Parashuram takes up the case and investigates whether Sameera existed, opposed in court by lawyer Viswanath.

== Cast ==
- Srikanth as Notary Parashuram
- Mukesh Rishi as PP Viswanath
- Ananya Sharma as Vedha
- Rayala Harishchandra as Narayana
- Snehal Kamat as Sameera
- V.V. Sameer as Inspector Dhamu

== Episodes ==
No. overall	No. in season	Title	Directed by	Written by	Original release date
1	1	"Flames of Justice"	Santhosh Ayyappan	Raj Kumar Akella, Suryaa and Santhosh Ayyappan	31 July 2026
Narayana dies by suicide outside the court, an event that affects Parashuram, a lawyer who has withdrawn from courtroom practice. Vedha, a junior lawyer, questions his reluctance to take on the case, and Parashuram eventually decides to represent Narayana.
2	2	"Sparks of Change"	Santhosh Ayyappan	Raj Kumar Akella, Suryaa and Santhosh Ayyappan	31 July 2026
Parashuram and Vedha find that unidentified bodies can be buried without proper records, complicating efforts to confirm Narayana's identity. Vedha gathers CCTV footage and shares Narayana's photograph online, while Parashuram finds a petition connected to Narayana hidden near the court.
3	3	"The Breaking Point"	Santhosh Ayyappan	Raj Kumar Akella, Suryaa and Santhosh Ayyappan	31 July 2026
Parashuram returns to active courtroom practice and files a habeas corpus petition. Vedha's family receives threats connected to the case, and she locates a witness, Lakshmi, through hospital and ledger records.
4	4	"Surmount the Challenge"	Santhosh Ayyappan	Raj Kumar Akella, Suryaa and Santhosh Ayyappan	31 July 2026
A constable, Yamuna, discloses information about Narayana's efforts to seek justice before his death. Parashuram identifies procedural violations in the handling of unidentified bodies and presents evidence that the girl presented as Sameera is not her.
5	5	"The Hunt for the Truth"	Santhosh Ayyappan	Raj Kumar Akella, Suryaa and Santhosh Ayyappan	31 July 2026
Parties opposing Parashuram's case coordinate to withhold evidence, and police pressure increases on Lakshmi and Murali's family. Vedha is attacked after finding a lead through vehicle registration records, while Parashuram searches for Sameera's foster father.
6	6	"The Concealed Reality"	Santhosh Ayyappan	Raj Kumar Akella, Suryaa and Santhosh Ayyappan	31 July 2026
Parashuram's past, including the death of a woman named Soujanya, is revealed as the cause of a medical condition that led him to leave the courtroom. Vedha secures Parashuram's release after he is implicated in a false case, and he locates the real Sameera.
7	7	"The Truth Unveiled"	Santhosh Ayyappan	Raj Kumar Akella, Suryaa and Santhosh Ayyappan	31 July 2026
Parashuram rescues Sameera before an attempt is made to silence her and presents evidence linking the case to a state legislator. Constable Yamuna disguises herself as Sameera to protect her, allowing Sameera to testify in court.

== Production ==
Objection My Lord was produced by Raj Kumar Akella under Dream House Productions and directed by Santhosh Ayyappan, who also contributed to the series' screenplay and dialogue. The series was shot over 19 days.

== Release ==
Objection My Lord premiered on ZEE5 on 31 July 2026. A trailer was released ahead of the premiere, unveiled by the actor Chiranjeevi.

== Reception ==
NTV Telugu rated the series 2.75 out of 5, describing it as an engaging courtroom thriller that avoids the loud confrontations typical of commercial Telugu cinema in favour of a more realistic approach. The review praised Srikanth's restrained performance and the production values, but found the reasoning behind Parashuram's years-long withdrawal from the courtroom underdeveloped and the antagonist underwritten, and called the ending somewhat predictable.

Writing for HMTV, G. Krishna described the series as gripping in its opening episodes but said its momentum faded by the end, leaving it as an average drama overall. The review praised Srikanth's performance as composed and emotionally grounded, and Snehal Kamat's turn as Sameera, but found the scenes written for Mukesh Rishi's antagonist underwhelming and said the series did not sustain suspense through to its conclusion. It also noted the background score, particularly the title music, as an effective element of the production.
