= C. R. Manohar =

Indian film producer and politician

CR Manohar
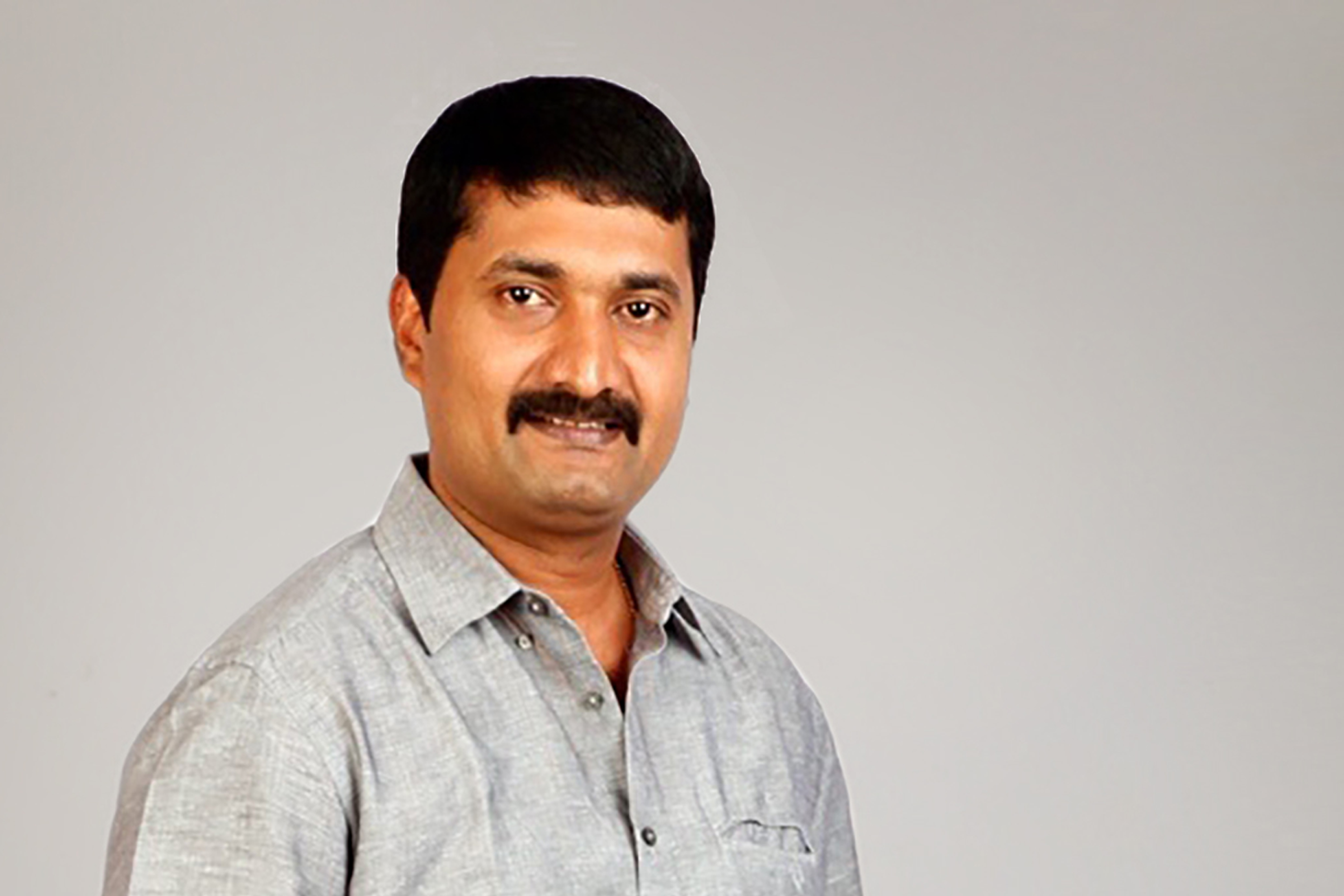
- CR Manohar in 2017
- Born: 7 December 1979 (age 46); Sarjapura, Karnataka, India
- Occupations: Politician, Producer, Businessman
- Spouse: T.A. Suvarna
- Children: 3
- Relatives: Ishan
- Website: http://crmanohar.com/

C.R. Manohar is an Indian film producer and politician known for his work exclusively in Telugu cinema and Kannada cinema. He owns the production house Tanvi Films. He has produced successful drama films such as Mahatma, Shivam, Ranga the Donga, Vajrakaya and Rogue. He is the first time MLC (JDS) from Chikkabalapura and Kolar Constituency, Karnataka.

== Filmography ==
=== As producer ===
| Year | Title | Language | Notes |
|---|---|---|---|
| 2007 | Orata I Love You | Kannada | |
| 2008 | Janumada Gelathi | Kannada | |
| 2009 | Mahatma | Telugu | |
| 2010 | School Master | Kannada | |
| 2010 | Ranga The Donga | Telugu | |
| 2015 | Vajrakaya | Kannada | |
| 2015 | Shivam | Kannada | |
| 2017 | Rogue | Telugu, Kannada | |
| 2017 | Amma | Kannada, Hindi | Unreleased film |
| 2018 | The Villain | Kannada | |
| 2022 | Raymo | Kannada | |
