= Orata I Love You =

- DVD cover
- Directed by: Shri
- Written by: Anil Kumar (dialogues)
- Produced by: C. R. Manohar
- Starring: Prashanth; Sowmya
- Cinematography: B Suresh Babu
- Edited by: K Girish Kumar
- Music by: G. R. Shankar
- Production company: Golden Lion Film Division
- Release date: 20 November 2007
- Country: India
- Language: Kannada

Orata I Love You (also known as Orata; transl. Country man) is a 2007 Indian Kannada-language romantic drama film directed by Shri and starring newcomers Prashanth and Sowmya. The film was a box office failure despite being profitable. After this film, Prashanth was referred to as Orata Prashanth.

== Cast ==
- Prashanth as Varada
- Sowmya as Kavya
- Harish as Santhosh
- Sathyajith as Gowda
- Avinash
- Mandya Ramesh
- Dhanaraj
- Mumaith Khan as an item number in "Adu Hyanga Helalo"

== Production ==
Hridaya made her debut under the name of Sowmya.

== Soundtrack ==
The soundtrack was composed by newcomer G. R. Shankar. The song "Yaaro Kannalli Kannanittu" from the film became popular.

Orata I Love You

Soundtrack album by G. R. Shankar
- Released: 9 October 2007
- Recorded: 2007
- Genre: Feature film soundtrack
- Length: 38:46
- Language: Kannada
- Label: Jhankar Music

Official audio
- Full Album on YouTube

Track listing
No.	Title	Writer(s)	Singer(s)	Length
1.	"Banthu Banthu"	K. Kalyan	S. P. Balasubrahmanyam	4:29
2.	"Omme Ninna"	Hemanth Kumar	Nanditha Rakesh	4:35
3.	"Yene Yene"	Shri	Rajesh Krishnan	3:53
4.	"Adu Hyanga"	K. Kalyan	S.P. Balasubrahmanyam, M.D. Pallavi	4:40
5.	"Yaaro Kannalli"	K. Kalyan	Rajesh Krishnan, Nanditha	5:34
6.	"Manasithu Ninna"	G. R. Shankar	Karthik	5:08
7.	"Aa Brahmange"	Shri	Hemanth Kumar	4:21
8.	"Saddu Saddu"	K. Kalyan	Rajesh Krishnan, K. S. Chithra	4:48
Total length:				38:46

== Reception ==
A critic from The Times of India wrote that "Prashanth gives his best and Sowmya is okay. G R Shankar’s music is good". R. G. Vijayasarathy of Rediff.com wrote that "In a nutshell, though Orata I Love You may not be in the same league as Duniya or Mungaru Male, it certainly is a well-made film with good dialogues, decent performances, scintillating music and good choreography". A critic from Chitraloka.com said that "This story has been told in an interesting manner by Sreenivas. The music by debutant music director B.R.Shankar is the highlight of the film".
