= Parthu =

Parthasarathy (Parthu)
- Born: Nemani Parthasarathy; 24 September 1974 (age 51); Kakinada, East Godavari district
- Origin: Andhra Pradesh, India
- Genres: Playback singing
- Occupations: Singer, music director
- Years active: 1997–present
- Website: parthu.co.in

Parthasarathy Nemani (born 24 September 1974), popularly known as Parthu, is an Indian Telugu playback singer in Tollywood with rich classical music background. Parthu has rendered more than 100 film songs and sung more than 2000 private songs in Telugu, Tamil, Hindi, and Kannada. Parthu is one of the very few Telugu playback singers who has performed internationally.

Parthu debuted as music director with a recent Telugu film and has also composed music for several fusion, devotional albums.

== Early life ==
Parthasarathy Nemani (Parthu) was born in 1974 in a traditional Telugu family in Kakinada, East Godavari District, Andhra Pradesh, India.

Parthu began learning Carnatic classical music at the age of five and had his initial training from Smt.Srilakshmi and advanced training from Neti Sriram Sarma. He had his entire schooling in Kakinada and subsequently graduated from Vasavi College of Engineering in Mechanical Engineering.

== Achievements ==
Parthu won numerous awards in more than 400 competitions at various levels in the fields of Carnatic classical, light music and film music. Some of his major accomplishments include:

- National Level Award in All India Radio Competitions in 1992
- First prize in the South Zone Inter-University competitions-Mangalore in 1993
- First prize at National Level in Inter-University competitions at Benares Hindu University, Varanasi in 1994
- Winner of first Mega final of Padutha theeyaga, the first singing reality show in Andhra Pradesh which was aired on ETV and conducted by renowned playback singer, Sri S P Balasubrahmanyam in 1996.

=== Cinematic achievements ===
- Parthu recorded his first film song for music director, Koti for the film Kalyana Prapthirasthu, directed by Sri Dasari Narayanarao in 1997. Parthu worked as an associate to the lead music director Sri Mani Sarma, for more than 50 films. Parthu has performed playback singing for a majority of leading movie actors as Chiranjeevi, Venkatesh, Kamal Hasan, Srikanth, Jagapathi Babu and so on in about 90 films.

== Concerts ==
Parthu has more than 500 stage performances to his credit in India and abroad. Parthu is one of the very few playback singers to perform in all five continents including in the US, UK, Australia, Kuwait, and is the first Telugu playback singer to perform in Botswana and Nigeria. Parthu gave performances together with other renowned singers like S P Balasubrahmanyam, Smt. S. Janaki, Mano and Smt. Chitra.

== Albums and musical direction ==
Parthu sang more than 2000 private songs which include devotional songs, folk music, light music and songs for television serials.

Parthu composed two songs "Kudikannu Adirene" and "Kanna Velugantha" for Kalatapaswi Sri K. Viswanath's movie Swarabhishekam. The film won the National Award for Music. Parthu debuted as music director with the movie Nandeeswarudu in 2012. Parthu composed music for several devotional, fusion and remix albums.

Parthu has established a sophisticated recording studio "Keerthana Digital" in Hyderabad in the year 2001.

== Charity ==
Parthu, with the help of some friends established the Lotus Foundation, a non-profit organisation to support the educational needs of 'Economically Backward Brilliant Students' in 2009. It has been supporting a number of students in Engineering and Medicine many of whom have successfully completed their studies and got employed upon graduation.
