= O Chinadana =

2002 Indian Romantic comedy

- DVD cover
- Directed by: E. Sathibabu
- Written by: Marudhuri Raja (Dialogues)
- Screenplay by: E. Sathibabu
- Produced by: Mullapudi Brahmanandam
- Starring: Srikanth; Raja; Gajala; Shruthi Raj; Asha Saini
- Cinematography: C. Ramprasad
- Edited by: A. Sreekar Prasad
- Music by: Vidyasagar
- Production company: Rajeswari Films
- Release date: 25 January 2002
- Country: India
- Language: Telugu
- Box office: ₹6 crore distributors' share

O Chinadana is a 2002 Indian Telugu-language romantic comedy film directed by E Sathi Babu starring Srikanth, Raja, Gajala, Asha Saini and Sruthi Raj. The film was produced by Mullapudi Brahmanandam for Rajeswari Films. The film was a box office success. The main theme of the film was taken from the Hollywood film 10 Things I Hate About You (1999).

== Plot ==
Ramya falls in fall in love with Srinivasa "Seenu" Sastry, but her elder sister, Divya hates love because of her childhood friend Rajesh. The lovers plot and introduce Narasimha, a thief as Rajesh, the childhood friend to lure Divya. Rest is how the pairs marry.

== Cast ==
- Srikanth as Narasimha / fake Rajesh
- Raja as Srinivasa "Seenu" Sastry
- Shruthi Raj as Divya Reddy
- Gajala as Ramya Reddy
- Asha Saini as Chamanthi
- Jaya Prakash Reddy as Major Rajasekhar Reddy
- Brahmanandam as Hyderabad/Secunderabad
- Ali as Ali
- Kovai Sarala as Veena Tantula Meera Bai
- Tanikella Bharani as Lawyer Avadhani
- Brahmaji as Rajesh
- Kota Srinivasa Rao as SI Kotayya
- Babu Mohan as Bhadrayya
- Benarjee
- Yamuna in a cameo

== Soundtrack ==
The film's soundtrack was composed by Vidyasagar and the lyrics were written by Sirivennela Seetharama Sastry.

Track List
No.	Title	Singer(s)	Length
1.	"Dimdimtara Dimdimtara"	S. P. Balasubrahmanyam, Uma Ramanan	04:29
2.	"Havva Havva"	Swarnalatha, Mano	04:59
3.	"Oh Chinadana"	Devashish	05:07
4.	"Veelu Choosi Vela Choosi"	Tippu, Gopika Poornima	04:32
5.	"Vonti Meeda Pattu Koka"	S. P. Charan, Sujatha, Swarnalatha, Mano	05:04

== Reception ==
Jeevi of Idlebrain rated the film three out of five and wrote, "Over all, it's a watchable film that has got some entertainment value. Made on a shoestring budget, this Srikanth-starrer is all set to recover the money and make handsome profits." A critic from Full Hyderabad wrote, "This film falls precisely into that category, where everything is as morbid as the designation of this title to a Jane Austin novel." Gudipoodi Srihari of The Hindu noted, "Director Sattibabu and dialogue writer Maruduri Raja can take full credit for making this film an engrossing and entertaining comedy."
