= Srikanth (actor, born 1968) =

Indian actor (born 1968)

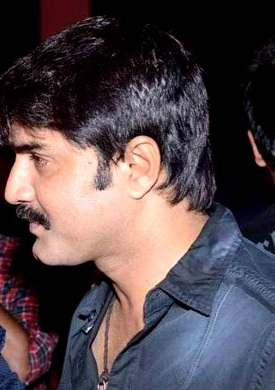
- Born: Meka Srikanth; 23 March 1968 (age 58); Gangavathi, Karnataka, India
- Education: Karnataka University, Dharwad, Karnataka, india
- Occupation: Actor
- Years active: 1991–present
- Spouse: Ooha (m. 1997)
- Children: 3, including Roshan

Meka Srikanth (born 23 March 1968) is an Indian actor who is known for works predominantly in Telugu cinema. He has also appeared in some other language films including Kannada, Malayalam and Tamil films. He has appeared in more than 140 films.

He has received one state Nandi Award, and one Filmfare Award South. He has starred in films like Swarabhishekam, which won the National Film Award for Best Feature Film in Telugu for 2004. Srikanth's another film Virodhi premiered at the Indian panorama section, at the 2011 International Film Festival of India. Sri Rama Rajyam also had a special screening at International Film Festival of India on 28 November 2011.

== Early life ==
Srikanth was born on 23 March 1968 in Gangavathi, Karnataka, India. His father, Meka Parameswara Rao (1946–2020), was a wealthy landlord who migrated from Mekavaripalem of Krishna district, Andhra Pradesh to Gangavathi. He graduated with a Bachelor of Commerce degree from Karnataka University, Dharwad and moved to Chennai to pursue a career in films.

== Personal life ==
Srikanth married Ooha on 20 January 1997, and has two sons, Roshan and Rohan and a daughter, Medha. The family lives in Jubilee Hills, Hyderabad.

== Career ==
In 1990, Srikanth joined Madhu Film and TV Institute of Acting in Hyderabad and completed a one-year course in acting. His first film People's Encounter was released in 1991. Srikanth played minor roles as a villain and supporting artiste early in his career. He became a lead actor with the film One by Two (1993).

Srikanth collaborated with various film directors including: S.V. Krishna Reddy, Krishna Vamsi, Jayanth C. Paranjee, G. Neelakanta Reddy, EVV Satyanarayana, K. Raghavendra Rao, K. Viswanath, to give hits including: Varasudu (1993), Pelli Sandadi (1996), Vinodam (1996), Egire Paavurama (1997), Aahwanam (1997), Maa Nannaki Pelli (1997), Kshemamga Velli Labamgarandi (2000), O Chinnadana (2002), Khadgam (2002), Pellam Oorelithe (2003), Shankar Dada M.B.B.S. (2004), Evandoi Srivaru (2006), Operation Duryodhana (2007), Shankar Dada Zindabad (2007), Mahatma (2009) and Govindudu Andarivadele (2014). He has starred in more than 100 Telugu films as a lead.

In Sri Rama Rajyam (2011), Srikanth has done the role of Lakshmana this film will be a feather in his cap.

Srikanth who has acted in Kannada, Malayalam films before is making his Tamil film debut with Varisu (2023). In 2026, he appeared in the Telugu courtroom series ZEE5 Original Objection, My Lord!.

== Filmography ==
=== Telugu films ===
Key
| † | Denotes films that have not yet been released |

| Year | Title | Role | Notes | Ref. |
|---|---|---|---|---|
| 1991 | People's Encounter | Naxalite | | |
| 1991 | Madhura Nagarilo | Sattiraju | | |
| 1992 | Seetharatnam Gari Abbayi | Veerababu | | |
| 1992 | Pellam Chepithe Vinali | Chinna | | |
| 1992 | President Gari Pellam | Narendra | | |
| 1993 | Jeevitame Oka Cinema | | | |
| 1993 | Aasayam | Student | | |
| 1993 | Ratha Saradhi | Ramineedu | | |
| 1993 | Varasudu | Vamsi | | |
| 1993 | Kondapalli Raja | Srikanth | | |
| 1993 | Rowdy Annayya | Gopi | | |
| 1993 | Donga Alludu | Giri | | |
| 1993 | Abbaigaru | Murari | | |
| 1993 | Rajeswari Kalyanam | Bhavani's brother | | |
| 1993 | Rowdy Gaari Teacher | Dorababu | | |
| 1993 | Chinna Alludu | Srikanth | | |
| 1993 | One By Two | Balaji | Debut as lead actor | |
| 1994 | Donga Rascal | Srikanth | | |
| 1994 | Nyaya Rakshana | | | |
| 1994 | Aame | Anjineelu | | |
| 1995 | Love Game | Raghu | | |
| 1995 | Ghatotkachudu | Arjuna | | |
| 1995 | Patabasti | Ajay | | |
| 1995 | Taj Mahal | Amar | 25th Film | |
| 1995 | Ooriki Monagaadu | Rambabu | | |
| 1995 | Simha Garjana | Teja | | |
| 1996 | Pelli Sandadi | Vijay Krishna | | |
| 1996 | Kuthuru | Srikanth | | |
| 1996 | Vetagadu | Inspector Kiran | | |
| 1996 | Once More | Sitaram | | |
| 1996 | Prema Prayanam | Sanjay | | |
| 1996 | Vinodam | Raja | | |
| 1997 | Thaali | Bose Babu | | |
| 1997 | Egire Paavurama | Balu | | |
| 1997 | Aahvaanam | Ravi | | |
| 1997 | Kaliyugamlo Gandargolam | | | |
| 1997 | Taraka Ramudu | Ramudu | | |
| 1997 | Hello I Love You | Revanth | | |
| 1997 | Maa Nannaku Pelli | Balaraju | | |
| 1998 | Ooyala | Raja | | |
| 1998 | Nidhi | Srikanth | | |
| 1998 | Pandaga | Anand | | |
| 1998 | Gilli Kajjalu | Suresh | | |
| 1998 | Kanyadanam | Niwas | | |
| 1998 | Suprabhatam | Gopala Krishna | | |
| 1998 | Chandralekha | Himself | Guest appearance | |
| 1998 | Gamyam | Kamal | | |
| 1998 | Subhalekhalu | Sri | | |
| 1998 | Aayanagaru | Madhu | | |
| 1999 | Manikyam | Manikyam | 50th Film | |
| 1999 | English Pellam East Godavari Mogudu | Sambasiva Rao "Samba" | | |
| 1999 | Manasulo Maata | Vasanth | | |
| 1999 | Anaganaga Oka Ammai | Vishnu | | |
| 1999 | Pilla Nachindi | Dattu | | |
| 1999 | Panchadara Chilaka | Murali | | |
| 1999 | Preyasi Rave | Vamsi | | |
| 2000 | Kshemamga Velli Labamgarandi | Ravi | | |
| 2000 | Chala Bagundi | Vamsi | | |
| 2000 | Choosoddaam Randi | Bhimavaram Buchi Babu | | |
| 2000 | Ninne Premistha | Kalyan | | |
| 2000 | Ammo! Okato Tareekhu | Pattabhi | | |
| 2000 | Devullu | Lord Srirama | | |
| 2000 | Tirumala Tirupati Venkatesa | Venkatesa | | |
| 2000 | Sakutumba Saparivaara Sametam | Vamsi | | |
| 2001 | Maa Aavida Meeda Ottu Mee Aavida Chala Manchidi | Jagadesh | | |
| 2001 | Deevinchandi | Siva | | |
| 2001 | Kalisi Naduddam | Krishna | | |
| 2001 | Naa Manasistha Raa | Shankar | | |
| 2001 | Prema Sandadi | Krishna | | |
| 2001 | Darling Darling | Chinni | | |
| 2002 | O Chinnadana | Rajesh / Narasimha | | |
| 2002 | Aaduthu Paaduthu | Gopi | | |
| 2002 | Tappu Chesi Pappu Koodu | Kappaganthula Ramesh | | |
| 2002 | Khadgam | A.C.P. Radha Krishna | | |
| 2003 | Pellam Oorelithe | Vivek | | |
| 2003 | Ottesi Cheputunna | Surya | | |
| 2003 | Donga Ramudu and Party | Ramakrishna | 75th Film | |
| 2003 | Oka Radha Iddaru Krishnula Pelli | Viswa | | |
| 2003 | Nenu Pelliki Ready | Gopikrishna | | |
| 2003 | Neeke Manasichaanu | Vivek | | |
| 2004 | Intlo Srimathi Veedhilo Kumari | Sukumar | | |
| 2004 | Letha Manasulu | Raju | | |
| 2004 | Swarabhishekam | Srirangam Ranga Chary | | |
| 2004 | Shankar Dada M.B.B.S. | Any Time Murder "ATM" | | |
| 2005 | Sankranthi | Vishnu | | |
| 2005 | Radha Gopalam | Gopalam | | |
| 2005 | Soggadu | Himself | Cameo appearance | |
| 2005 | Kanchanamala Cable TV | Sudarshanam | | |
| 2006 | Sarada Saradaga | Raghava | | |
| 2006 | Evandoi Srivaru | Surya | | |
| 2006 | Mayajalam | Vamsi | | |
| 2006 | Sri Krishna 2006 | Takhada Ramakrishna | | |
| 2006 | Aadi Lakshmi | Aadi / Shankar | | |
| 2007 | Operation Duryadhona | Mahesh / Bhagavanthudu | | |
| 2007 | Shankar Dada Zindabad | Any Time Murder "ATM" | | |
| 2007 | Yamagola Malli Modalayindi | Yuva Yama Dharma Raju | | |
| 2008 | Michael Madana Kamaraju | Madan | | |
| 2008 | Nagaram | Right | | |
| 2008 | Kousalya Supraja Rama | Sriram | | |
| 2009 | Mahatma | Dasu | 100th film | |
| 2009 | A Aa E Ee | Chandram | | |
| 2010 | Ranga The Donga | Ranga, Bhavani Prasad | Dual role | |
| 2011 | Dushasana | Mahesh / Common Man | | |
| 2011 | Virodhi | Jayadev | Also producer | |
| 2011 | Sri Rama Rajyam | Lakshmana | | |
| 2012 | All the Best | Ravi | | |
| 2012 | Shirdi Sai | Dasaganu | | |
| 2012 | Lucky | Lakshmi Narayana | Also playback singer | |
| 2012 | Devaraya | Sri Krishnadevaraya, Dorababu | Dual role | |
| 2013 | Sevakudu | Surya | | |
| 2013 | Shatruvu | Shankar | | |
| 2013 | Shadow | A.C.P. Pratap | | |
| 2014 | Kshatriya | Surya | | |
| 2014 | Malligadu Marriage Bureau | Malli | | |
| 2014 | Veta | Jagan | | |
| 2014 | Govindudu Andarivadele | Bangari | | |
| 2015 | Dhee Ante Dhee | Radha Krishna | | |
| 2015 | Veediki Dookudekkuva | Kranthi | | |
| 2016 | Terror | Vijay | | |
| 2016 | Sarrainodu | Sripati | | |
| 2016 | Mental | Durga Prasad | | |
| 2017 | Yuddham Sharanam | Nayak | | |
| 2018 | Raa Raa | Raj Kiran | 125th Film | |
| 2018 | Operation 2019 | Uma Shankar | | |
| 2019 | Marshal | Sivaji | | |
| 2021 | Jai Sena | | | |
| 2021 | Idhe Maa Katha | Mahendra | | |
| 2021 | Telangana Devudu | Vijay Dev | | |
| 2021 | Akhanda | Varadarajulu | | |
| 2022 | Kothala Rayudu | Ajay | | |
| 2022 | Son of India | Mahendra Bhupati | | |
| 2023 | Hunt | Mohan Bhargav | | |
| 2023 | Skanda | Rudrakanti Ramakrishna Raju | | |
| 2023 | Kota Bommali PS | Chintada Rama Krishna | | |
| 2024 | Devara: Part 1 | Rayappa | | |
| 2025 | Game Changer | Bobbili Sathyamurthy | | |
| 2025 | Arjun Son Of Vyjayanthi | Prakash | | |
| 2026 | Mister Middle Class | Venkataramana | | |

=== Films in other languages ===
| Year | Title | Role | Language | Notes |
|---|---|---|---|---|
| 1993 | Hendthi Helidare Kelabeku | Mohan | Kannada | |
| 2007 | Ugadi | Arjun | Kannada | |
| 2017 | Villain | Felix D. Vincent | Malayalam | |
| 2018 | The Villain | Raja | Kannada | |
| 2022 | James | Vijay Gayakwad | Kannada | |
| 2023 | Varisu | Jai Rajendran | Tamil | |

=== Television ===
| Year | Title | Role | Network |
|---|---|---|---|
| 2020 | Chadarangam | Pemmasani Gangadhar Rao | ZEE5 |
| 2020 | Shootout at Alair | IG Praveen Chand | ZEE5 |
| 2026 | Objection, My Lord! | Notary Parashuram | ZEE5 |

== Awards ==
- Nandi Special Jury Award - Mahatma
- Filmfare Best Supporting Actor Award - Shankar Dada M.B.B.S.
- SIIMA Award for Best Supporting Actor (Telugu) - Sarrainodu
- 15th Santhosham Film Awards for Best Supporting Actor (Telugu) - Sarrainodu
- SIIMA Award for Best Actor in a Negative Role (Telugu) - Akhanda
