= Telugu Association of North America =

North American umbrella organization

Telugu Association of North America (TANA)
- Founded: 1977
- Founder: Dr. Ravindranath Guthikonda
- Founded at: New York, United States
- Location: Detroit, Michigan, United States
- Origins: NRI Telugu population in the United States
- Region served: United States; Canada
- Members: 100,000
- Owner: TANA
- Volunteers: 2,000
- Website: Official website

Telugu Association of North America (also referred to as TANA) is a non-profit organization and is one of the oldest Indian-American national-level organization primarily for networking of Telugu people in North America. Niranjan Srungavarapu is the President of TANA (for 2023-2025), while Anjaiah Chowdary Lavu was the President of TANA till July 2023. Nagendra Srinivas Kodali is the Chairperson of the Board of Directors. Sasikanth Vallepalli is the Chairman of TANA Foundation.

== Legal issues ==
In April 2025, media reports stated that the Telugu Association of North America (TANA) was under investigation by U.S. federal authorities in connection with the alleged misuse of corporate charitable donation matching programmes. According to reports, the investigation followed the termination of employees at U.S. companies, including Fannie Mae and Apple, over irregularities linked to donation matching schemes involving certain non-profit organisations.

Reports further stated that U.S. authorities, including the Federal Bureau of Investigation, Internal Revenue Service, and Department of Justice, were examining TANA’s role in the matter. In December 2024, a U.S. district court reportedly issued a subpoena seeking records related to donations, expenditures, and organisational representatives. The association had not publicly commented on the allegations at the time of reporting.

In 2017–2018, the Telugu Association of North America (TANA) was referenced in a United States federal investigation into a Sex-trafficking case involving Telugu film actresses, after accused individuals were alleged to have used forged invitation letters bearing the names of various Telugu associations. According to media reports, victims told US law-enforcement agencies that they had been invited to cultural events in the United States using such letters, including those purportedly issued by TANA; however, the association stated that the letters were fake and denied any involvement in the activities.

In connection with the investigation, US authorities questioned office-bearers of TANA regarding the alleged misuse of the organisation’s name and letterheads. TANA officials maintained that the association had no relationship with the accused individuals and did not authorise any such communications.
