= Thirupathi (2006 Kannada film) =

2006 Indian Kannada-language film directed by Shivamani

- Directed by: Shivamani
- Written by: B. A. Madhu (dialogues)
- Screenplay by: Shivamani; S. S. David
- Story by: S. S. David
- Produced by: Padma R. S. Gowda
- Starring: Sudeep; Pooja Kanwal
- Cinematography: A. C. Mahendran
- Edited by: Nagendra Urs
- Music by: Rajesh Ramanath
- Production company: Gowda Enterprises
- Distributed by: Ramu Films
- Release date: 30 June 2006
- Running time: 144 minutes
- Country: India
- Language: Kannada

Thirupathi is a 2006 Indian Kannada-language action film, directed by Shivamani, stars Sudeep and Pooja Kanwal, with Charan Raj and Shanoor Sana in supporting roles. The background score and soundtrack were composed by Rajesh Ramanath with lyrics by Kaviraj, Shivamani and Krishna. The film did poorly at the box-office.

== Plot ==
Margaret, a newly appointed district commissioner in Bangalore, has cancelled the illegal construction of a building owned by Michael Raj, a notorious boss of organized crime. Aadhi, Raj's Son, tries to convince Margaret to cancel the demolition, but she refuses. Furious, Aadhi and his friends brutally rape and shoot her. Nikhil, Margaret's friend, who was unconscious when the assault took place, partially witnessed the crime. He takes Margaret to the police station for help, but she dies.

Inspector Bachche Gowda, a corrupt police officer and associate of Michael Raj, frames Nikhil as Margaret's murderer. Constable Adarsh informs Police Commissioner, Ajay Kumar, about the truth and asks him to replace Gowda with an honest officer for the investigation of Margaret's murder. Ajay Kumar assigns ACP Thirupathi to the case. Kumar's daughter Nandhini is in love with Thirupathi, but he does not share her feelings. In Bangalore, Thirupathi stays with his mother, Bharathi.

Thirupathi discovers the fake evidence planted by Gowda. He arrests the doctor who had made the false postmortem report, releases Nikhil, and arrests Aadhi for Margaret's murder.

Michael Raj urges Thirupathi to free his son, but Thirupathi refuses. He also reveals that he knows Michael Raj's original name, Dhanraj, and threatens to reveal Raj's past. The court frees Aadhi after an associate of Raj's contradicts Nikhil's testimony. Meanwhile, Nandhini begs Thirupathi to marry her and threatens to commit suicide if he refuses.

Michael Raj kidnaps Adarsh's wife and demands that he hand over Nikhil in exchange for her return. Thirupathi arrests the other culprits involved with Aadhi in Margaret's murder. Adarsh is killed by Raj's gang, who also kidnaps Nikhil. Thirupathi is abused and shattered in the court because Nikhil cannot testify. Michael Raj threatens to kill Nikhil if Thirupathi continues to pursue the case, but Thirupathi reveals that Raj had cheated his wife for money.

It is revealed that Michael Raj, originally known as Dhanraj, is Thirupathi's father and that he cheated Thirupathi's mother, Bharathi, for money. Twenty years ago, Dhanraj accepted properties from his boss in exchange for allowing his boss to have sex with Bharathi. Their son Akash killed the man in defense of his mother, and Bharathi left Dhanraj, telling him that she will henceforth consider herself a widow. Akash, who was sent to juvenile detention for 10 years, changed his name to Thirupathi and promised his mother that he would become a justice man.

After learning that Thirupathi is his son, Dhanraj wants Thirpuathi to join him in crime. Dhanraj's friend Ekanath Bhavade, the Home Minister, suspends Thirupathi for mishandling Margaret's murder case and reassigns Gowda to the investigation. Having been suspended from his role as a police officer, Thirupathi feels liberated to take justice into his own hands. Thirupathi finds Nikhil's mobile phone in Yeswanthpur, which contains a video from Nikhil's kidnapping. Thirupathi captures the trio who are Michael Raj's friends children. He interrogates them but they initially refuse to talk, after which he tortures them. Anil, the son of the Home Minister, the main witness to this murder, confesses to Thirupathi. Thirupathi forces Anil to call his father and tell him that Michael Raj had kidnapped them and had threatened to kill them if they testified against Aadhi.

The Home Minister and confronts Michael Raj, who denies kidnapping Anil. The Home Minister gives Raj 24 hours to release Anil. Thirupathi enters there confessing that he kidnapped the trio and made them call Michael and asks Michael Raj to release Nikhil and surrender Aadhi. Thirupathi, disguised as a bald man, kills Kailasnath, one of the men who murdered Margaret, which was witnessed by Michael Raj. The Commissioner reinstates Thirupathi as a police officer at the request of the Home Minister.

Thirupathi thanks Michael Raj for reinstating him and tells him to surrender as soon as possible. Thirupathi next targets and murders Pramod, the second culprit, in front of Aadhi. However, he was still alive the next morning and taken to the hospital, Pramod identifies Michael Raj as his killer seconds before dying. The Home Minister orders Thirupathi to arrest Michael Raj, but he cannot, due to a lack of evidence. Thirupathi tells Michael Raj to surrender his son Aadhi immediately. Bachche Gowda, having been ordered by Aadhi to find Anil, tells Thirupathi that he wants to assist in the search for Anil. Thirupathi and Gowda arrive to rescue Nikhil; Gowda is shot by Aadhi while saving him. Frustrated, Thirupathi shoots Aadhi to death.

Thirupathi returns Anil to his father, and in exchange, the Home Minister grants Thirupathi permission to shoot Michael Raj, who has kidnapped Bharathi and Nadhini. Michael Raj, also known as Dhanraj, approaches Thirupathi at Kolar Gold Fields, where Thirupathi finds a box containing Anil's head. It is revealed that Anil was innocent and was used by Thirupathi to prosecute Aadhi and the other culprits. Dhanraj and Thirupathi fight, in the presence of Bharathi, leaving Thirupathi badly beaten. Bharathi encourages Thirupathi to kill Dhanraj. Thirupathi kills Dhanraj.

== Cast ==
- Sudeep as ACP Thirupathi / Akash (childhood name)
- Pooja Kanwal as Nandini
- Charan Raj as Michael Raj aka Dhanraj
- Shanoor Sana as Bharathi, Thirupathi's mother
- Dharma as Aadhi, Michael Raj's adopted son
- Lakshman as Police Commissioner Ajay Kumar
- Rangayana Raghu as Home Minister Ekanath Bhavade
- Ashok Rao as Amarnath
- Ramesh Pandith as Inspector Bachche Gowda
- Kaddipudi Chandru as Anil, Ekanath's son
- P. N. Sathya as Gangster Onte Krishna
- Killer Venkatesh as Constable Adarsh
- Yathiraj as Nikhil, Margaret's friend
- Sudha Rani as District Commissioner Margaret (cameo appearance)
- Sundeep Malani as Court Judge (cameo appearance)

== Production ==
Shivamani, who had directed movies such as Rajakeeya, Dore, Vishwa, and Omkara, wanted to make a cop action movie. He approached his friend Upendra, who had collaborated with him in Omkara, but he was busy due to scheduling conflicts, so he suggested Shivamani about Sudeep. Shivamani and Upendra narrated the story to Sudeep, who accepted the offer. He played the role of a police officer for the first time in his career. He earlier played a police officer for a comedy sequence in Nalla (2004). Deepu was initially considered to play the heroine. This is Pooja Kanwal's second Kannada film after 7 O' Clock (2006). This is Sudeep's second film with producer R. S. Gowda after Maharaja (2005). Seetha and Bhanupriya were considered to play Sudeep's mother. Shanoor Sana, who had collaborated with Sudeep in movies like Huchcha (2001) and Chandu (2002), was finalised for the mother role. Charan Raj portrays the role of the antagonist collaborating with Sudeep for the second time after Thayavva (1997), latter's debut film.

== Soundtrack ==
Tirupathi

Soundtrack album by Rajesh Ramanath
- Released: 2006
- Genre: Feature film soundtrack
- Language: Kannada
- Label: Akash Audio
- Producer: Rajesh Ramanath

Rajesh Ramanath chronology
| My Autograph (background score) (2006) | Tirupathi (2006) | Jambada Hudugi (2007) |

The soundtrack was composed by Rajesh Ramanath collaborating with Sudeep for the fifth time after Huchcha (2001), Vaalee (2001), Swathi Muthu (2003) and My Autograph (Background score only).

| No. | Title | Lyrics | Singer(s) | Length |
|---|---|---|---|---|
| 1. | "Lakha Lakha" | Kaviraj | Rajesh Krishnan, Sunitha |
| 2. | "Hodi Maga" | Shivamani | Chaitra H. G. |
| 3. | "Gumma Gumma" | Kaviraj | Chetan Sosca, Sunitha |
| 4. | "Bole Bole Jimbole" | Krishna | Avinash |
| 5. | "Thayiye Magana" | Krishna | Rameshchandra |

== Reception ==
R. G. Vijayasarathy from IANS stated that "Tirupati is an engaging entertainer which can be a tasty full meal for film fans of action flicks". A critic from Rediff.com wrote "it is Sudeep's film all the way. He oozes talent in every frame and it is really his spirited performance as Tirupati that saves the film". A critic from Chitraloka.com wrote that "Action lovers cannot miss this film". Sify wrote "Director Shivamani's takings are good as usual. The story is wafer thin, but the narration and style in presentation makes the film watchable. Sudeep fits the role perfectly and his body language and dialogue delivery are good as he carries the film on his shoulders. Heroine Pooja Kanwal has nothing much to do, while Charanraj and Rangayana Raghu excel as villains". The film had high collections initially but later dipped in collections.
