= Magadi (disambiguation) =

Magadi is a town in the Indian state of Karnataka.

Magadi may also refer to:

- Magadi Assembly constituency, a Karnataka Legislative Assembly electoral constituency covering the city
- Magadi Bird Sanctuary, Magadi, Karnataka, India
- Magadi (crater), a crater on Mars
- Magadi (film), a 2012 Indian film
- Lake Magadi, a lake in Kenya
  - Magadi, Kenya, a town in Kenya
  - Magadi Soda Company, Kenya
- Magadi Puttarudriah (1903–1983), Indian entomologist

== See also ==
- Magadha (disambiguation)
- Magadis, an ancient Greek string instrument
- Magadi Road metro station, station of the Namma Metro in Bengaluru, Karnataka, India
