= Ranga (S.S.L.C) =

2004 film by Yogaraj Bhatt

- VCD cover
- Directed by: Yogaraj Bhat
- Written by: Duniya Suri
- Produced by: N. Kumar
- Starring: Sudeep; Ramya
- Cinematography: S. Krishna
- Edited by: Nagendra Urs
- Music by: Sandeep Chowta
- Production company: Sri Lakshmi Films
- Release date: 23 April 2004
- Country: India
- Language: Kannada
- Budget: ₹1.25 crore

Ranga (S.S.L.C) is a 2004 Indian Kannada-language masala film written by Duniya Suri and directed by Yogaraj Bhat. It stars Sudeep and Ramya in the lead roles. Nagashekar, Umashree and Rangayana Raghu appear in other significant roles. The film follows Ranga (Sudeep), a hot-headed auto rickshaw driver trying to turn his life around by clearing his SSLC examinations, whose romance with Padma (Ramya) unfolds amid gang rivalries, personal loss and violence.

The film was produced by N. Kumar. Sandeep Chowta composed the film's score and soundtrack, while S. Krishna and Nagendra Urs served as cinematographer and editor. Principal photography began on 23 January 2004, before seeing theatrical release exactly three months later. The film received generally positive reviews and emerged as a commercial success. Critical praise was directed at Bhat's direction, Suri's dialogue and Sudeep's performance. The has attained cult status among fans. It was later dubbed into Hindi as Ranga Dada (2013).

== Plot ==
Ranga is an auto rickshaw driver in Bangalore who lives with his mother Paru. He is frequently involved in violent clashes with a rival gang led by the imprisoned gangster Kunta Naga and his associates, brother Kala, and Kariya. Despite his rowdy lifestyle, Ranga repeatedly attempts to clear his SSLC examinations after failing several times. However, his efforts are constantly disrupted by gang conflicts, including an incident where he abandons the examination hall after learning that his friend Japan has been attacked by the rivals determined to prevent him from passing.

During this time, Ranga meets Padma, a mild-mannered young woman from a respectable family, and instantly falls in love with her. Although Padma's doctor father strongly disapproves of Ranga's violent behaviour and reputation, she gradually develops feelings for him. Meanwhile, Kunta Naga is released from prison and seeks revenge against Ranga, whom he blames for the death of his son Prakash. Despite repeated attacks from Naga's men, Ranga continues to defend himself and those close to him. Padma, believing that education can reform his life, encourages him to focus on his studies and helps him prepare for another SSLC attempt by tutoring him in English.

As Ranga appears for the examinations once again, he receives the devastating news that his mother has been killed in a cylinder blast planned by Kala, Naga's brother. Shattered by the tragedy, he begins to lose faith in life and confides in Padma, who decides to leave her family and stay with him despite her father's opposition. Meanwhile, Naga's men plant a bomb in Ranga's auto rickshaw intending to kill him. However, the vehicle is borrowed by Ranga's friend Japan, who is taking his mute wife Pakizah to the hospital, and Japan is killed in the explosion.

Naga and his men find a grief-stricken Ranga mourning his friend's death at the graveyard, and beat him up severely before throwing him off a bridge. Believing him dead, they proceed to inform this and threaten Padma's family, forcing them to leave the city. The trauma leaves Padma emotionally shattered and psychologically disturbed. Ranga eventually returns alive and kills Naga and his associates in revenge. He later reunites with Padma, only to find her unable to recognize him because of her deteriorated mental state. Accepting responsibility for her condition, Ranga carries her off vowing to care for her for the rest of his life as her father watches on.

== Cast ==
- Sudeep as Ranga
- Ramya as Padma
- Umashree as Paru
- Sanjana
- Rangayana Raghu as Kunta Naga
- Myna Chandru as Kala
- Nagashekar as Japan
- Bank Janardhan as K. Panduranga, Padma's father
- Nagesh Kashyap
- Renukamma Murgod as Padma's grandmother
- Vijay as Kariya
- M. N. Lakshmi Devi as Savitri, Naga's mother

== Production ==
=== Development ===
Ranga (S.S.L.C) was the second collaboration of friends and film writers Yogaraj Bhat and Duniya Suri, after they worked together on the former's directorial debut, Mani (2003). The film was first announced in mid-2003. Sudeep first met Bhat during the rerecording of Mani and expressed interest of working with him. He reportedly stuck to Bhat despite the commercial failure of Mani. Bhat conceptualized Sudeep's character as one with a "unique" behavior and language. He also stated that a new version of the Kannada language would be used which would entertain the viewers. The makers announced during the launch that they aimed for a 23 April 2004 theatrical release for the film, after the SSLC examinations concluded that year in Karnataka.

=== Casting ===
Bhat stated that the film bore no resemblance to the then recently released Hindi film, Munna Bhai M.B.B.S. (2003), while adding that his film was "... 80 per cent comedy and 20 per cent sentiment." Sudeep, who was coming on the back of commercial and critical successes, Kiccha (2003) and Swathi Muthu (2003), was paired opposite Ramya for the first time, who had the commercial hit Excuse Me (2003) behind her. Rangayana Raghu was cast in a pivotal role. Daisy Bopanna, who was initially signed as second female lead on the film, did not appear in it. Nagashekar was cast as Japan, a friend of Sudeep's character. Sudeep reportedly recommended Nagashekar for the role after he saw him in a play. Duniya Vijay was also cast in a prominent role, marking his film debut. Rangayana Raghu was hired to play an antagonist, which he "did add a bit of comic twist".

=== Filming ===
The film was launched on 23 January 2004. It was the 23rd film produced by N. Kumar. Revealing the plot details in an interview during the filming stage, Bhat stated: "Ranga loses his father, while he was about to write his S.S.L.C. examinations. That creates havoc in his mind. His behavioral patterns are strange. You have to see it to understand. Even the language we have used in this film looks different. Music by Sandeep chowtha [sic] is yet another highlight. It is a comedy film for the masses." A significant portion of the filming took place in Bangalore, in the then recently renovated Abhiman Studio.

== Soundtrack ==
Ranga SSLC

Soundtrack album by Sandeep Chowta
- Released: 23 March 2004
- Genre: Feature Film soundtrack
- Length: 26:17
- Language: Kannada
- Label: Anand Audio
- Producer: Sandeep Chowta

Sandeep Chowta chronology
Company (2002)	Ranga SSLC (2004)	Super (2005)
External audio
- Official Audio Jukebox on YouTube

The soundtrack album and background score were composed by Sandeep Chowta. The album consists of five tracks, lyrics for which were written by V. Nagendra Prasad. The audio album was distributed by Anand Audio.

Track listing
No.	Title	Singer(s)	Length
1.	"Dove Dove Duniya"	Sudeep	5:10
2.	"Manase Manase"	Rajesh Krishnan, K. S. Chithra	6:15
3.	"Oora Kannu"	Raju Ananthaswamy, Sonu Kakkar	4:56
4.	"Chitte Chitte"	Rajesh Krishnan, Shamitha Malnad	4:55
5.	"Bhoomi Yake"	Shamitha Malnad, Raju Ananthaswamy, Sandeep Chowta	5:01
Total length:			26:17

== Release and reception ==
The film was received well by audiences and critics upon theatrical release.

A critic from Viggy wrote, "A peculiar mannerism of Sudeep, well-restrained direction by Yogaraj Bhat, thoughtful dialogs by Soori - all put together forms Ranga (SSLC), a complete entertainer." They stated that Sudeep "steals the show completely", while commending other acting performances, the music and the camerawork. They concluded writing: "Overall, Ranga (SSLC) is perfect masala entertainer in all aspect; for all class!". Their views were echoed by S. N. Deepak of Deccan Herald, who too praised the acting performances, Chowta's music and Krishna's cinematography, while calling Suri's dialogue "a pluspoint of the film". A reviewer for Indiainfo labelled the film "a good pastime", and praised the Bhat's direction and Suri's dialogue.

== Awards ==
2004–05 Karnataka State Film Awards

- Best Dubbing Artist (Female) — Deepa Bhaskar
