= Master Hirannaiah =

Indian actor (1934–2019)

- Born: Narasimha Murthy; 15 February 1934; Mysuru, Karnataka, India
- Died: 2 May 2019 (aged 85); Bangalore, Karnataka, India
- Occupations: Film actor; director; comedian; writer (story; screenplay; lyrics); playback singer; theatre & drama and television artist
- Notable work: Lanchavathara
- Spouse: Shanthamma
- Children: 5

Narasimha Murthy, known by his stage name Master Hirannaiah (15 February 1934 – 2 May 2019), was an Indian actor known for his work in Kannada theatre and Kannada cinema. His films include ...Re (2016), Care of Footpath 2 (2015), No 73, Shanthi Nivasa (2007).

== Early life ==
Hirannaiah was born in Mysore on 15 February 1934. His father K. Hirannaiah too was an Indian actor, director, and writer in the Kannada film industry and a theatre artist in the state. His mother was Sharadamma. After finishing primary education in Banumayya Middle school, Hirannaiah completed intermediate in Sharada Vilas, Mysore, Karnataka. In his childhood days, he distributed newspaper Sadhvi to fund his education, while actively participating in drama and theatre plays.

After his father's death, Hirannaiah took over the management of the K.Hirannaiah Mitra Mandali, which was founded by his late father. Later he became actor, director and administrator of the theatre company.

"The audience is my censor board. They have paid for their ticket, if they have a problem or they disagree they can stand up and talk about it"

"My method is to have my commentary on various issues in the middle, while the beginning and end has the catchphrase which gets the attention of the audience."

— Master Hirannaiah, sharing his thoughts with Deccan Chronicle

== Career ==
Master Hirannaiah was part of more than 30 movies in Kannada. His notable drama plays include Makmal Topi, Law Athava Lau Lau, Lanchavathara, Double Thaali, Kanya Dahana, Sanyasi Samsara, Chamachavathara, Haasyadalli Ulta Palta, Kapi Mushti, Nadubidi Narayana, Bhrashtachaara, Anaachaara, with Lanchavathara playing more than 11 thousand times, over a span of 45 years, performing in countries like United States, Australia, Singapore, and England.

=== Hirannaiah Award ===
Master Hirannaiah established the Hirannaiah Award, in memory of his father who was known popularly as "cultural comedian" or "cultured comedian". Hirannaiah Awards are presented on behalf of Karnataka Nataka Academy, to theatre artists (native name: Rangamukhagalu) for their notable drama works. First award ceremony was held on 17 April 2010, at the Jaganmohan Palace auditorium in Mysore, Karnataka.

== Death ==
Hirannaiah died on 2 May 2019 at a hospital in Bengaluru, Karnataka of complications from liver disease, aged 85.

== Filmography ==
Year	Title	Role	Notes
1955	Modala Thedi		
1956	Daiva Sankalpa		
1956	Muttaide Bhagya		
1957	Chintamani		
1978	Devadasi		Double role; dialogue writer
1978	Madhura Sangama		Cameo appearancee
1983	Ananda Sagara		
1984	Runa Mukthalu		
1985	Devara Mane		
1987	Sampradaya		Actor, director, story writer, screenplay writer, dialogue writer and lyricist
1987	Hosa Madam		
1992	Harakeya Kuri		
1992	Shakthi Yukthi	—N/a	Wrote lyrics for songs "Nalle Ninna Mudige" and "Sundari Neenu"
1995	Operation Antha	Hirannaiah	
1995	Kalyanothsava		
1998	Chor Guru Chandal Shishya	—N/a	Wrote lyrics for song
2001	Mussanje	Shivaramu	
2002	Marma		
2004	The City		
2005	Hudgeer Saar Hudgeeru		
2006	Savira Mettilu		
2007	Gaja	Gaja's grandfather	
2007	Bombugalu Saar Bombugalu		
2007	No 73, Shanthi Nivasa	Kailasanathayya	Also playback singer for song "Adaddella Olledaytu"
2007	Lancha Samrajya	Dattatreya	
2009	Ee Sambhashane		
2010	Niranthara		
2010	Yaksha	Yaksha's grandfather	
2012	Sankranthi		
2015	Care of Footpath 2		
2016	...Re		

== Awards won ==
- Rajyotsava Prashasti
- Gubbi Veeranna Award (1988)
- Sangeet Natak Akademi Award
- Sandesha Arts Award (2009)
- 18th Anakru Nirman Swarna Award (2013)
- Maha Advaithi Award (2017)
- Alva's Nudisiri Award (2005)

== See also ==
- List of people from Karnataka
- Cinema of Karnataka
- List of Indian film actors
- Cinema of India
