= Care of Footpath =

- DVD cover
- Directed by: Kishan Shrikanth
- Screenplay by: Jogi; Udayamarakini
- Story by: Kishan Shrikanth
- Produced by: Shylaja Shrikanth
- Starring: Kishan Shrikanth
- Cinematography: P. Mathew Rajan
- Edited by: B. S. Kemparaju; Lakshman Reddy
- Music by: Ravi Dattatreya; Background score: Srivathsa
- Production company: Kiran Movie Makers
- Release date: 24 November 2006
- Running time: 135 minutes
- Country: India
- Language: Kannada
- Budget: ₹80 lakh (equivalent to ₹2.6 crore or US$300,000 in 2023)
- Box office: ₹26.8 million (equivalent to ₹86 million or US$1.0 million in 2023)

C/o Footpath (or Care of Footpath) is a 2009 Indian Kannada-language film directed by Master Kishan, who also stars in the film. It was directed by the world's then-youngest film director, Guinness Record Holder Kishan Shrikanth. Shrikanth has since been surpassed as the world's youngest director by Saugat Bista, the 7-year-old director of Love You Baba.

The film was released in 2006 with a running time of 135 minutes. It received the Best Children's Film Award at the 54th National Film Awards.

It was dubbed into other Indian languages including Hindi, Oriya, Malayalam, Bengali, and Tamil as well as English. A sequel titled Care of Footpath 2 was released in 2015.

== Synopsis ==
An orphan slum boy is adopted by an old lady who finds him on a footpath. He lives with her in the slums, where he makes a living picking up rags. Some school students call him an uneducated brute, which gives him the impetus to get educated. The story tells how he battles the odds of his circumstances to get an education.

== Cast ==
- Master Kishan as Slummu
- Jackie Shroff as the Chief Minister
- Saurabh Shukla as Ranga
- Tara as Saraswati Teacher
- B. Jayashree as Slummu's care taking mother
- Sa. Ra. Govindu as Govindu
- Sudeep as Shankar (guest appearance)
- Vaijanath Biradar as the watchman
- Ambareesh as himself (uncredited guest appearance)

== Production ==
C/o Footpath had a budget of 20 million rupees (about $450,000). The shoot lasted for 55 days, over a period of 5–6 months. Filming took place in Mumbai.

== Reception ==
R. G. Vijayasarathy of Rediff.com wrote that "The bottom line: Care Of Footpath is certainly much better than the predictable Kannada films that are released every week". Reviewing the Tamil dubbed version titled Sadhanai in 2007, Malini Mannath of Chennai Online wrote that "it's commendable that Kishen has managed to give a warm, feel good film with a clear, socially relevant message". S. R. Ashok Kumar of The Hindu reviewing Tamil dubbed version, wrote "It is really a commendable job that nine-year old Kishan has done directing Sadhanai, full-length feature film. The simple story touches one's heart and one cannot help getting involved with the characters".

== Awards ==
Awards and nominations
Award	Wins	Nominations
National Film Awards	1	0
Karnataka State Film Awards	2	0
SICA (South India Cinematographers Association Awards)	1	N/A
- Totals
Awards won	4
Nominations	0 + N/A

54th National Film Awards:

- Best Children's Film

Karnataka State Film Awards:

- Best Child Actor - Kishan Shrikanth
- Special Award

SICA (South India Cinematographers Association Awards):

- Special Jury Award (for directing & acting) - Kishan Shrikanth
