= Karnataka State Film Award for Best Dubbing Artist (Female) =

Indian film award

- State award for contributions to Kannada cinema
- Sponsored by: Government of Karnataka
- Rewards: Silver Medal; ₹10,000
- First award: 2004–05
- Final award: 2010–11
- Most recent winner: Anushree

Highlights
- Total awarded: 7
- First winner: Deepa

The Karnataka State Film Award for Best Dubbing Artist (Female) is one of the Karnataka State Film Awards in India. It has been presented annually since 2005 by the government of Karnataka for Kannada films.

== Winners ==
Year	Recipient	Dubbed For (Artist)	Film	Refs.
2004–05	Deepa	Ramya	Ranga SSLC	
2005–06	Amrutha Singh	Vidya Venkatesh	Nenapirali	
2006–07	Deepa	Meera Jasmine	Arasu	
2007–08	Champa Shetty	Lakshmi Hegde	Kurunaadu	
2008–09	Asha		Shankara Punyakoti	
2009–10	Deepa	Ramya	Just Maath Maathalli	
2010–11	Anushree	Reema Vohra	Murali Meets Meera	
