= Deepa Bhaskar =

Actor, voice artiste and Kathak dancer

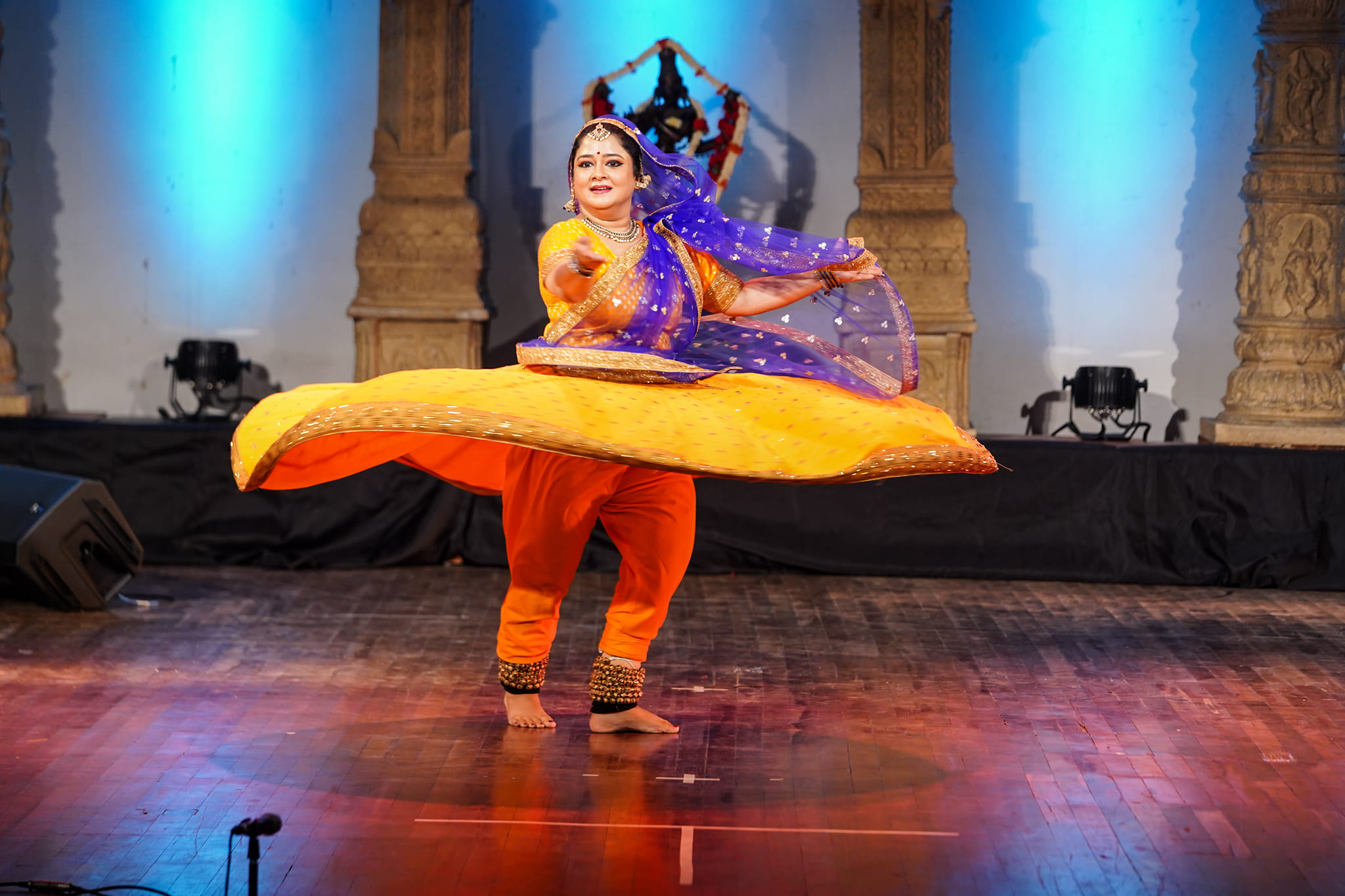
- Born: Bangalore, Karnataka, India
- Other name: Deepu
- Occupations: Actor, voice artiste and Kathak dancer

Deepa Bhaskar is an Indian film and theatre actor, voice artiste and Kathak dancer. Considered by many to be a child prodigy who was introduced to the film industry through Tiger Prabhakar's movie Mahendra Varma. She has acted in several Kannada movies. She has played the lead role in movies like My Autograph and No 73, Shanthi Nivasa.

== Personal life ==
Born to Late Shri. S R Bhaskar and Smt. Uma M S, Deepa resides in Bangalore. She tied the knot with Shri. Bharath Nagendra in the year 2016.

== Career ==
=== Actor ===
Deepa got introduced to the film industry as a child actor in Tiger Prabhakar's directorial Mahendra Verma. Since then she had the opportunity of working in many Kannada movies like Yare Nee Abhimani, Deepavali, Super Star, Shrirasthu Shubhamasthu and so on. She played her first lead role in actor Sudeepa's directorial My Autograph. She also played the lead role in No 73, Shanthi Nivasa.

Deepa also stormed through the small screen through her impeccable acting abilities. She became popular with her roles in television soap operas like Dibbana, Preeti Illada Mele, Papa Pandu, Malebillu, Anavarana, Madarangi, Ninnolumeyindale, Yugantara and several more. She portrayed the character of the most loved Subbalakshmi in the famous television serial aired on Zee Kannada, Subbalakshmi Samsara. Her comic timing was on display when she played the role of Urmila in the famous comedy based talk show series on Colors Kannada, Majaa Talkies.

=== Voice artiste ===
Deepa is also known fondly for her contributions to Kannada film industry as a voice artiste or more commonly called Voice Dubbing. She has dubbed / lent her voice to several of the leading ladies of Kannada film industry in over 500 movies. Deepa made her debut as voice artiste in the film Abhi. Excuse Me, Mungaru Male, Jogi, Duniya, Bulbul, Bhajarangi, Googly, Krishnan Love Story, Shivalinga, Malashri starrer Ganga are a sample list of movies in which Deepa lent her voice to the heroines of the movie. Ramya, Pooja Gandhi, Deepa Sannidhi, Aindrita Ray, Priyanka Upendra, Priyamani, Rachita Ram, Malashri are a few to name for whom Deepa has lent her voice in their movies. Actresses like Trisha Krishnan, Sneha, Amala Paul, Bhavana, Shriya Saran and others had Deepa as their voice when they acted on the Kannada silver screen. Deepa has won 3 state awards for her voice dubbing work in Arasu, Ranga SSLC and Just Maath Maathalli.

=== Kathak dancer ===
Deepa is also a trained Kathak dancer. She started as a Kathak dancer under the tutelage of Smt. Nirupama Rajendra and Shri. Rajendra. Under their guidance she toured across the American and European continents and has performed as a dancer. She is pursuing her advanced Kathak training currently under Shri. Sharat R Prabhat at the Prabhat Academy of Dance in Bangalore. She has performed as a Kathak Dance at several prestigious platforms over the last few years.

=== Productions ===
Deepa has also tried her hand in direction and production of music videos in collaboration with her husband Shri. Bharath Nagendra. She has directed 4 music videos viz., An Evening Coffee, My Two Cents, Storm in a Tea Cup and Shubhayoga. These are music videos where the traditional Dasa sahitya of Shri Purandara Dasaru has been knitted to a contemporary presentation to showcase that a piece of literature composed in the early 16th century is still relevant to the modern day society of the 21st century. As part of the Shubhayoga video production she had the opportunity to work with and direct the who's who of the Carnatic and Hindustani music field of Karnataka. To name a few - Vidwan. Anoor Ananthakrishna Sharma, Vidwan. Tirumale Srinivas, Vidushi. Sathyavathi, Vidushi. Nagamani Srinivas, Pandit. Nagaraja Rao Havaldar, Vidwan. S Shankar, Pandit. Fayaz Khan and Vidushi Varijashree Venugopal.

== Awards and felicitations ==
- Aryabhata award for best child anchor (putani.com-a children talk show)
- State award for the best child actor female - 'Putti'(2001)
- State award for best dubbing artist female -'Ranga SSLC'(2004)
- State award for best dubbing artist female - 'Arasu'(2006)
- State award for best dubbing artist female - 'Just Math Mathalli'(2009)
- Zee Kutumba Awards Best Actor in Lead Role Female - 'Subbalakshmi Samsara' (2017 and 2018)
- Zee Kutumba Awards Best Actress forever in Zee Kannada - 'Subbalakshmi Samsara' (2019)
