= Ee Sambhashane =

- Directed by: M. Rajashekar
- Written by: M. Rajashekar
- Produced by: Major Srinivasa; Poojar; Jyothi Basavaraj
- Starring: Sandesh; Hariprriya
- Cinematography: K. S. Chandrashekar
- Edited by: Suresh Urs
- Music by: V. Manohar
- Production company: Om Sai Productions
- Release date: February 20, 2009
- Running time: 135 minutes
- Country: India
- Language: Kannada

Ee Sambhashane is a 2009 Indian Kannada romance film written and directed by M. Rajashekar. The film was produced by Major Srinivasa Poojar and Jyothi Basavarajand. It features Sandesh and Hariprriya in the lead roles. The supporting cast includes Sumalatha, Ramakrishna, Master Hirannayya and M N Lakshmidevi. The score and soundtrack for the film is by V. Manohar and the cinematography is by K. S. Chandrashekar.

== Cast ==
- Sandesh
- Hariprriya
- Sumalatha
- Ramakrishna
- Master Hirannayya
- M. N. Lakshmidevi
- B. Ganapathi
- Sharan
- Bullet Prakash

== Soundtrack ==
Ee Sambhashane

Soundtrack album by V. Manohar
- Genre: Feature film soundtrack
- Language: Kannada
- Label: Raj Audio
- Producer: Major Srinivasa

The film's background score and the soundtracks are composed by V. Manohar. The music rights were acquired by Raj Audio.

Tracklist
No.	Title	Lyrics	Singer(s)	Length
1.	"Chandakki Chandamama"	V. Nagendra Prasad	Sunitha S.
2.	"Thangali Aramanege"	V. Manohar	Rajesh Krishnan, Nanditha
3.	"Ondu Bacchaneya Nenape"	V. Manohar	Kunal Ganjawala
4.	"Jumthalaka Jum"	Kaviraj	Udit Narayan
5.	"Preethi Hoovella"	Shivananje Gowda	Ramesh Chandra
6.	"Munjaane Mussanje"	V. Manohar	K. S. Chithra
Total length:				Extra field
