= Nikita Thukral =

Indian actress and model

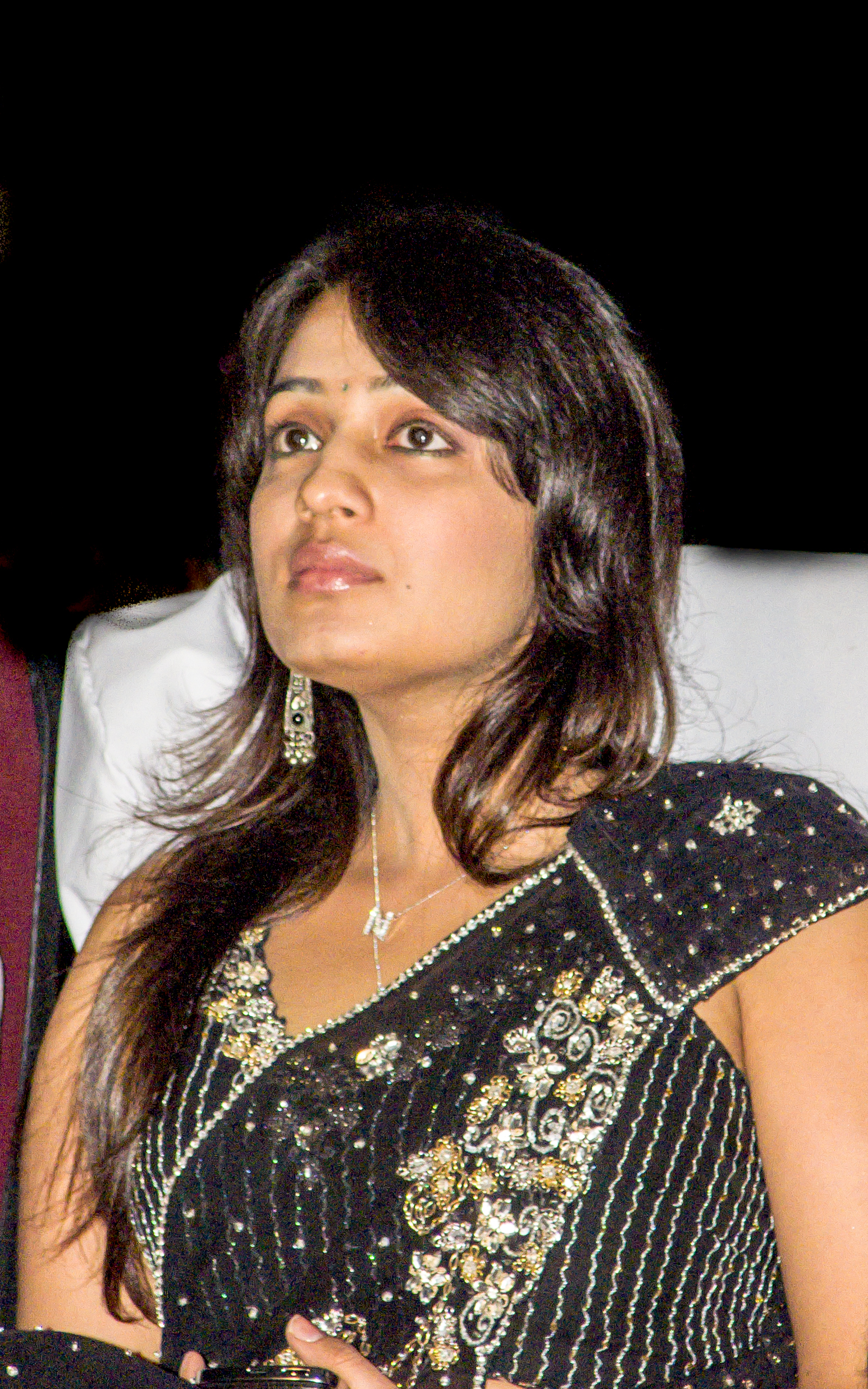
- Thukral in 2010
- Born: Bombay, Maharashtra, India
- Education: Master of Arts (Economics)
- Alma mater: Kishinchand Chellaram College, Mumbai
- Occupations: Actress; model
- Years active: 2002–2020
- Television: Bigg Boss Kannada – Reality Show
- Spouse: Gagandeep Singh Mago (m. 2017)
- Children: 1

Nikita Thukral is an Indian actress and model, who predominantly worked in Kannada and Telugu films alongside a few Tamil and Malayalam films.

== Early life ==
Thukral was born into a Punjabi Hindu family and was raised in Mumbai. She completed her M.A in Economics from Kishinchand Chellaram College, Mumbai. She was spotted by producer D. Ramanaidu while dining at a hotel in Juhu. He offered her a role in his upcoming film Hai (2002).

== Career ==
Thukral was the part of Aati Rahengi Baharein crew, which was a popular television drama series that aired on Zee TV channel on 9 September 2002. She then shifted to the South film industry by debuting in the Telugu film Hai. After appearing in Hai, Thukral starred opposite Fahad Fazil in his film debut Kaiyethum Doorath. The Malayalam film was not a box office success, but she was able to find additional roles in Tamil and Telugu films like Kurumbu and Sambaram. In 2005, she entered Kannada cinema with Kichcha Sudeepa's Maharaja. Thukral then returned to star in a Tamil film and featured in Venkat Prabhu's multistarrer Saroja as Kalyani, the concubine of a gangster portrayed by Sampath Raj, and won critical acclaim for her performance. Her appearance in the song "Kodana Kodi" was appreciated as the song became popular, while her role in the film also led to her winning the ITFA Best Supporting Actress Award. The success led her to sign on to appear in a big film production, Gautham Vasudev Menon's Chennaiyil Oru Mazhaikaalam in a role alongside Trisha Krishnan, but the film was shelved after two schedules.

After 2008, she shifted her priority from Telugu to Kannada cinema, going on to co-star with leading actors Upendra, Puneeth Rajkumar, V. Ravichandran and Darshan. After Prince, she signed on to be part of several films including Cottonpet and Priyasakha, opposite Ramesh Aravind and a Telugu film named Apartment, but none of them saw a theatrical release. Her next releases were the Tamil thriller film Muran, that saw her playing Indhu, alongside actors Cheran and Prasanna and the historical film, Kranthiveera Sangolli Rayanna. Her only 2013 release was the Tamil masala film Alex Pandian. In 2014, she was seen in three Kannada films, although two of them, Namaste Madam and Namo Bhootatma, featured in her cameo roles only. Her future films include the crime drama Ring Road Shubha, reportedly the first Kannada film to be made by an all-women crew, the horror flick Avunu 2 in Telugu as well as the anthological drama Traffic that would mark her Hindi debut.

In addition to acting, Thukral has also done modelling work for designer Roopa Vohra. She also participated in the first season of the reality show Bigg Boss Kannada, the Kannada version of Bigg Boss. She completed 99 days in the Bigg Boss Home and was the second runner-up of the show.

== Filmography ==
=== Film ===
Year	Film	Role	Language	Notes
2002	Hai	Priya	Telugu	
2002	Kaiyethum Doorath	Sushama Babunath	Malayalam	
2003	Kurumbu	Aparna	Tamil	
2003	Kalyana Ramudu	Kalyani	Telugu	
2003	Sambaram	Geeta	Telugu	
2004	Chatrapathi	Indhu	Tamil	
2004	Kushi Kushiga	Sandhya	Telugu	
2005	Bus Conductor	Noorjahan	Malayalam	
2005	Vetrivel Sakthivel	Manju	Tamil	
2005	Maharaja	Sitara	Kannada	
2006	Bhargava Charitham Moonam Khandam	Anupama	Malayalam	
2006	Evandoi Srivaru	Swapna	Telugu	
2006	Aganthakudu	Bhanumathi	Telugu	
2007	Maharajsri	Neelima	Telugu	
2007	Nee Navve Chalu	Sukanya	Telugu	
2007	Don	Nandini	Telugu	Special appearance
2007	Anasuya	Pooja	Telugu	Special appearance
2008	Bhadradri	Anu	Telugu	
2008	Nee Tata Naa Birla		Kannada	
2008	Saroja	Kalyani	Tamil	ITFA Best Supporting Actress Award
2008	Vamshi	Sharadha	Kannada	
2008	Chintakayala Ravi	Pooja (Poo)	Telugu	Special appearance
2009	Rajakumari	Bubbly	Kannada	
2009	Dubai Babu	Vasundhara	Kannada	
2009	Yodha	Asha	Kannada	
2009	Daddy Cool		Malayalam	Special appearance
2010	Naariya Seere Kadda	Radha	Kannada	
2011	Gun	Vandana	Kannada	
2011	Prince	Anjali	Kannada	
2011	Muran	Indhu	Tamil	
2012	MLA Mani: Patham Classum Gusthiyum		Malayalam	
2012	Gowri Putra	Ranjitha	Kannada	
2012	Snehitaru	Dancer	Kannada	Special appearance
2012	Kranthiveera Sangolli Rayanna	Mallamma	Kannada	
2013	Alex Pandian	Gayathri	Tamil	
2014	Namaste Madam		Kannada	Guest appearance
2014	Software Ganda	Priya S Rao	Kannada	
2014	Namo Bhootatma	Herself	Kannada	Cameo appearance
2015	Avunu 2	Swathi	Telugu	
2015	Kanal	Reenu Kuruvila	Malayalam	
2015	Ring Road	Khan's wife	Kannada	
2015	Paayum Puli	Folk dancer	Tamil	Special appearance in the song ''Soodana Moogini''
2015	Ranna	Herself	Kannada	Cameo appearance
2016	Terror	Pooja	Telugu	
2016	Traffic	Aditi	Hindi	
2016	Mukunda Murari	Sukanya	Kannada	
2017	Bongu	Item dancer	Tamil	Special appearance in the song ''Vella Kuritha''
2018	Rajasimha	Priya	Kannada	

=== Television ===
Year	TV Serial	Role	Notes
2002-2003	Aati Rahengi Baharein	Dr. Amar Sanghani's Sister	
2007	Kumkum - Ek Pyara Sa Bandhan	Siya Sharman Wadhwa	
2020	Yamaleela Aa Taruvatha	Ali's wife	
