= Kishan Shrikanth =

Indian actor and director

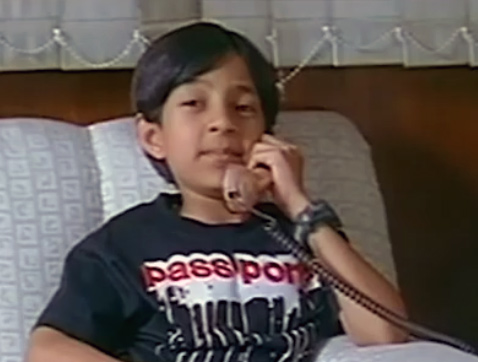
- Kishan Shrikanth, in 2006 Kannada film Thutturi
- Born: Kishan SS; 6 January 1996 (age 30); Bangalore, Karnataka, India
- Occupations: Film director, Film editor, Actor
- Years active: 2001–present

Kishan Shrikanth (born 6 January 1996), also known as Kishan SS or Master Kishan, is an Indian filmmaker and actor recognized by Guinness World Records as the youngest director of a professionally made feature-length film from Bangalore, Karnataka. As of January 2006, having acted in 24 films and in many popular Indian soap opera (more than 299 episodes), he directed a feature film, C/o Footpath (Care of Footpath), about an orphaned boy who wants to go to school. The film is adapted from a short story written by himself, and the cast includes prominent Indian actors such as Jackie Shroff and Saurabh Shukla.

In 2006, Kishan Shrikanth was recognized by Guinness World Records as the youngest director of a professionally made feature-length film, having directed Care of Footpath at the age of 9.

== Personal life ==
Kishan Shrikanth was born on 6 January 1996 in Bangalore to Shrikanth H. R., a commercial tax officer, and Shylaja, a sound technician-turned-composer. He has a sister.

=== Education ===
Kishan Shrikanth finished his 10th Standard at Camlin English School. He wrote to the government requesting to grant permission to directly take up a Masters Program (Master of Arts in Multimedia & Animation) directly after 10th grade at age of 15. It took him a year to convince various authorities and a technical evaluation was conducted to confirm his eligibility to take up the course. He was admitted into the Masters Program at the age of 16 and went on to become the youngest master's degree earner. He holds an MA in Multimedia.

== Career ==
=== Care of Footpath ===
In 2006, at the age of 9, Kishan directed Care of Footpath, a Kannada-language film featuring several prominent Indian actors. The film was later dubbed into multiple Indian languages and screened at international film festivals.

The story follows an orphaned boy adopted by an old lady living in a slum who, after being mocked by schoolchildren for being uneducated, resolves to pursue an education despite overwhelming odds. The narrative, reportedly inspired by the lives of Thomas Alva Edison, Michael Faraday, and former Indian President A. P. J. Abdul Kalam, explores themes of perseverance and social upliftment.Rao, Subha J. (17 October 2006). "Little big boy". The Hindu. The film was originally released in Kannada on 26 November 2006. It successfully ran for more than 100 days in Karnataka.

Shroff commented on him saying that "He is such a genius that I had to work in his film. He is constantly thinking about his next shot, constantly innovating to make it better. He is sure about what he wants from his actors".

=== Later Work ===
In 2015, Kishan Shrikanth directed Care of Footpath 2, a trilingual sequel to his earlier film. The movie explores themes of juvenile delinquency and the justice system, featuring actors such as Esha Deol and Avika Gor.

The film was submitted for consideration at the 88th Academy Awards through a qualifying theatrical release in Los Angeles. The film premiered in Los Angeles in October 2015, ahead of its Indian release.

== Filmography ==
=== Directed feature films ===
Film
Year	Title	Notes	Ref.
2006	C/o Footpath	Also story writer and playback singer	
2015	Care of Footpath 2	Also editor and music composer	

=== As an actor ===
Acting roles
Year	Title	Role	Notes	Ref.
2001	Grama Devathe	Kishan		
2001	Hello Narada			
2002	Law and Order	Kishan		
2002	Vamshakobba			
2002	Chandu	Bablu		
2002	Laali Haadu	Kishan		
2002	Hello	Kishan	also singer	
2002	Neenu Ilde Naanu Illa Kane			
2003	Excuse Me	Kishan		
2003	Swathi Muthu	Krishnamurthy		
2004	Saradara			
2005	Maharaja			
2005	Jogi			
2005	Thunta			
2005	Shambu			
2005	Encounter Dayanayak	Dayanayak (young)		
2006	C/o Footpath	Slummu	Also director, singer	
2006	Thutturi	Abhin		
2006	Miss California	Boy in the song "Mailari Linga"	Also playback singer	
2006	Aishwarya	Chintu		
2007	Ee Preethi Yeke Bhoomi Melide			
2007	Chili Pili Hakkigalu			
2008	Moggina Manasu	Chanchala's brother		
2008	Gnana Jyothi Sri Siddaganga			
2013	Teenage	Arya	Also editor	
2015	Care of Footpath 2	Krishna		
2015	Kill Them Young	Krishna	Hindi film	

As singer

- Jootata (2005)

== Awards and recognitions ==
=== 2003 ===
- Hello Gandhinagara Awards – Best Child Actor for Swathi Muthu

=== 2006 ===
- Golden Lotus National Film Award for Best Children's Film (Care of Footpath) – 54th National Film Awards
- Jury's Special Award (Care of Footpath) – Karnataka State Award
- Best Child Actor (Care of Footpath) – Karnataka State Award
- Opening Film – Kids for Kids International Film Festival, Cyprus

=== 2007 ===
- Telephono Azzuro (Children's Right) – Giffoni International Film Festival, Italy
- Chamber of Deputies Award - Second Best Film for Care of Footpath – Giffoni International Film Festival, Italy
- Children's Rights Award – The Film and Television Association of the Andaman and Nicobar Islands, India
- Closing Film – Busan International Film Festival, South Korea
- Official Selection – Chinh India Film Festival, New Delhi, India
- Official Selection – Mumbai Children's Film Festival

=== 2008 ===
- National Child Award for Exceptional Achievement – Government of India
- International Children's Jury Prize – Cairo International Film Festival for Children, Egypt
- International Jury Prize (Adult Jury) – Cairo International Film Festival for Children, Egypt
- Special Honorary Award – Alexandria International Film Festival (Journalist Syndicate, Cairo)
- Best Film Children's Jury Award (Care of Footpath) – 5th International Youth Film Festival (FICI), Spain
- Best Actor Award (Care of Footpath) – 5th International Youth Film Festival (FICI), Spain
- Special Honorary Award – 2nd Emotion Pictures International Festival on Disability-Athens, Greece
- Best Child Actor Silver Elephant Award – 15th Golden Elephant International Children's Film Festival, India
- Special Jury Award – South India Cinematographers Association-Chennai, India
- Closing Film – Flicks International Film Festival for Children, Saskatoon, Canada
- Official Selection - 22nd International Festival of Films for Children & Young Adults, (competitive section), Tehran, Iran
- Official Selection – Armenia International Film Festival for the Children, Armenia

=== 2009 ===
- Official Selection & American Premier- SAIFF (South Asian International Film Festival), New York

=== 2012 ===
- Karnataka Government permits to take Post graduation directly after 10th standard.
- 4th TiE-Aspire Young Achiever Award

=== 2014 ===
- Kishan enters The Forbes India 30 Under 30 List, the youngest entrepreneur to be recognised by Forbes.
