= Grama Devathe =

2002 film by Sai Prakash

- VCD cover
- Directed by: Sai Prakash
- Screenplay by: Sai Prakash
- Story by: Sai Prakash
- Produced by: K. N. Srilakshmi; E. Rajamma Saiprakash
- Starring: Meena; Prema; Sai Kumar
- Cinematography: Ramesh Babu; Srinivas
- Edited by: K. Eshwar
- Music by: Dhina
- Production company: Sri Lakshmi Mookambika Films
- Release date: 30 November 2001
- Running time: 145 minutes
- Country: India
- Language: Kannada

Grama Devathe (transl. Village Deity) is a 2001 Indian Kannada-language fantasy film written and directed by Sai Prakash. It stars Meena, Prema and Sai Kumar. The film was dubbed in Tamil as Angala Parameswari, in Telugu as Grama Devatha and in Hindi as Maa Devi Maa.

== Plot ==
On the request of the Hindu deity Shiva, his wife Parvati (Roja) incarnates into a deity, Angala Parameswari (Meena), to protect the Earth, and restore peace and righteousness.

In an Indian village, two families fix the marriage of their children Shankar and Kaveri (Prema) to each other, with the groom's family giving Kaveri a necklace. But, Lakshmana, the evil uncle of Kaveri wanted to marry his daughter to Shankar. When Kaveri's parents return home by boat, Lakshmana drowns their boat, killing Kaveri's parents. Kaveri survives, and is rescued by the temple priest Kaveri is hungry and crawls up to the idol of Angala Parameswari to drink milk. Miraculously, Angala Parameswari appears and breastfeeds her. The priest finds out about this and is thankful to the goddess. He raises her as his own child.

Years pass by and Kaveri grows up into a young woman and becomes an ardent devotee of the deity Angala Parameswari. After some time, Shankar, having become a doctor comes to the village to be married to Lakshmana's daughter. Shankar meets Kaveri while trying to heal her after being poisoned. Meanwhile, Kalabhujanga, a powerful and evil tantrik, is in search of a pure virgin's blood in order complete an evil ritual for him to gain immortality. Kaveri is chosen as the victim of his evil plan. When Kaveri is about to be married, Kalabhujanga kills the intended groom and Shankar marries the grief-stricken Kaveri, unaware that the deity has protected him from Kalabhujanga's mortal attack.

Kaveri and Shankar later have a son named Kishan (Kishan Shrikanth). As an act of revenge, Kalabhujanga tries everything to kill Kaveri and her family, but, the divine intervention of Angala Parameswari rescues them every time. In a last attempt, on the last day of the nine-day Hindu festival Navratri, Kalabhujanga binds Angala Parameswari in an army of tormented ghosts and possesses Kaveri. As Shankar vainly attempts to stop the possessed Kaveri from killing Kishan, Angala Parameswari frees herself and after a heated fight with Kalabhujanga, slays him by crushing him under her foot. The film ends with Angala Parameswari giving vision to the whole family.

== Cast ==
- Meena as Goddess Maramma / Grama Devathe
- Roja as Parvati
- Sai Kumar
- Prema as Kaveri
- Ghazan Khan
- Ragasudha
- Tennis Krishna
- Sathyajith
- Ranganath
- Chithra Shenoy
- Shridhar
- Sadashiva Brahmavar
- Rekha Das
- M. N. Lakshmi Devi
- Vaijanath Biradar
- Michael Madhu
- Dingri Nagaraj
- Bank Janardhan
- Bangalore Nagesh
- Kishan Shrikanth (credited as Master Kishan)

== Soundtrack ==
Grama Devathe

Soundtrack album by Dhina
- Released: 2001
- Genre: Feature film soundtrack
- Length: 37:32
- Label: Ashwini Audio

Dhina chronology
Middle Class Madhavan (2001)	Grama Devathe (2001)	King (2002)

The film score and soundtrack were composed by Dhina, making his debut in Kannada cinema. Lyrics for the soundtrack was written by K. Kalyan, R. N. Jayagopal and Sriranga. The soundtrack album consists of seven tracks.

=== Track listing ===
No.	Title	Lyrics	Singer(s)	Length
1.	"Amma O"	K. Kalyan	Anuradha Sriram	7:04
2.	"Gangama Gowramma"	Sriranga	S. P. Balasubrahmanyam, Swarnalatha	5:44
3.	"Jaya Jaya Jagadamba"	R. N. Jayagopal	Anuradha Sriram	4:07
4.	"Karamugide"	K. Kalyan	K. S. Chithra	6:15
5.	"Naane Adhi"		Swarnalatha	3:36
6.	"Shudram"		Mano	4:57
7.	"Shivaraja"	R. N. Jayagopal	Shankar Mahadevan, Nithyasree Mahadevan	5:49
Total length:				37:32

== Reception ==
The reviewer for Screen felt the film was "overfed with graphics." About the acting performances, the write: "Meena as Parvati looks magnificent. Prema looks pensive throughout. Saikumar is once again fit for nothing. Ghazal Khan is gusty. The comedy track of Tennis Krishna is a pain." They added, "The songs and music are below average. The hero of the film is graphics."
