= Annan Thangachi =

1999 film

- Title card
- Directed by: Charan Raj
- Written by: Ponniyin Selvan (dialogues)
- Screenplay by: Charan Raj
- Story by: Ajay Kumar
- Produced by: C. Kalpana; C. Devendraraj
- Starring: Charan Raj; Shruthi
- Cinematography: Pv. Krishna Prakash
- Edited by: M. N. Raja
- Music by: Deva
- Production company: Om Sree Vinayaga Films
- Release date: 7 May 1999
- Running time: 130 minutes
- Country: India
- Language: Tamil

Annan Thangachi (transl. Elder brother, younger sister) is a 1999 Indian Tamil-language drama film directed by Charan Raj. The film stars himself and Shruthi, while Ajay, Janagaraj, Pandu, Thalaivasal Vijay, Indhu, Vadivukkarasi, Ajay Rathnam, and K. R. Vatsala play supporting roles. It was released on 7 May 1999. The film was a remake of the Kannada film Thavarina Thottilu, also starring Charan Raj and Shruthi.

== Plot ==
Chinna Rasu (Charan Raj) is a rich landlord who treasures his lovely little sister Sarasu (Shruthi). They live with their family friend Azhagu (Pandu). Chinna Rasu is one of the richest people in his village, and he looks for the perfect groom for his sister.

In the meantime, Kodeeswaran (Janagaraj), a cheat game addict, looks for a wealthy bride for his son Baskar (Ajay Krishna) who could afford him a huge dowry. Baskar is a bank officer and perfect gentleman. The marriage broker Chitti (Thalaivasal Vijay) informs Kodeeswaran about Chinna Rasu's fortune. With Chitti's help, Kodeeswaran pretends to be a wealthy businessman and lies about his family condition to Chinna Rasu. Finally, Baskar and Sarasu get married. Kodeeswaran considers Sarasu as The Goose That Laid the Golden Eggs, then he pressures her for money. A few weeks later, when Chitti asks his commission to Kodeeswaran, Kodeeswaran refuses to pay and insults him. In anger and feeling guilty for ruining an innocent girl's life, Chitti reveals all the truth to Azhagu.

Later, Chinna Rasu marries Yashoda (Indhu). More years passed, and Sarasu gave birth to a girl. Chinna Rasu sold most of his lands to give money to Baskar's family and is now crippled with debts. Kodeeswaran used his money to gamble and lost everything, while Baskar lost his job. What transpires next forms the rest of the story.

== Cast ==
- Charan Raj as Chinna Rasu
- Shruthi as Sarasu
- Ajay Krishna as Baskar
- Janagaraj as Kodeeswaran, Baskar's father
- Pandu as Azhagu
- Thalaivasal Vijay as Chitti
- Indhu as Yashoda
- Vadivukkarasi as Yashoda's sister
- Ajay Ratnam as Yashoda's brother
- K. R. Vatsala as Baskar's mother
- Ravichandran
- Bhaskar
- Raja
- Baby Uma Maheswari

== Soundtrack ==
The soundtrack was composed by Deva, with lyrics written by Ponniyin Selvan.

Song	Singer(s)	Duration
"Manjal Kaathu"	Krishnaraj	5:18
"Sivappu Kallu"	Harish Raghavendra, Sangeetha	4:57
"Palana Palana"	Deva, Sabesh	4:33
"Thangachi Thangachi"	Krishnaraj, Anuradha Sriram	5:10
"Chinna Raasu"	"Ammapettai" Krishnamoorthy	0:51
"Poguthamma"	"Ammapettai" Krishnamoorthy	1:36
"Bam Bam"	Krishnaraj	0:59
