= Seetha (1990 film) =

- Directed by: S. A. Chandrasekhar
- Screenplay by: S. A. Chandrasekhar
- Story by: Shoba Chandrasekhar
- Produced by: Shoba Chandrasekhar; Sheela Siva
- Starring: Rahman; Kanaka; R. Sarathkumar; Gautami
- Cinematography: Indhu Chakravarthy
- Edited by: D. Shyam Mukherjee
- Music by: Vidyasagar
- Production company: Lalithaanjali Fine Arts
- Release date: 14 April 1990
- Running time: 115 minutes
- Country: India
- Language: Tamil

Seetha is a 1990 Indian Tamil language thriller film directed by S. A. Chandrasekhar. The film stars Rahman, Kanaka, R. Sarathkumar and Gautami, with Charan Raj, Janagaraj, Manorama, Radha Ravi, S. Shankar, Srividya and Delhi Ganesh playing supporting roles. It was released on 14 April 1990.

== Plot ==
The film begins with Seetha (Kanaka) returning to her native village after completing her studies in the city. Seetha and her parents lead a peaceful life until Boopathy, the son of the village zamindar, crosses her path. Boopathy spread terror among the villagers and he now wants to marry Seetha but she refuses. So Boopathy, who was very upset and frustrated by her refusal, kills her father. Seetha and her mother have no other choice than to flee the village.

In the city, Seetha finds a decent job and rents a house. On the other hand, Boopathy is still far from having forgotten Seetha so he tracks them the way to their house. He continues to ruin Seetha's life. One day, the police inspector Vijay (Rahman) comes to her rescue. At first Seetha isn’t interested at Rahman but after staying at his home with her mother one day when she goes to give rahman a cup of tea she accidentally finds him naked and can’t control her laughter, she continues to mock him regarding this and with this incident they become good friends and they eventually fall in love with each other and they get married afterwards. After the marriage, Vijay is arrested for a crime he did not commit. The journalist Jhansi Rani (Gautami) decides to save Seetha from Boopathy. Whereas Rathnaraj (R. Sarathkumar), a corrupt politician and Jhansi's husband, joins hand with Boopathy. What transpires next forms the rest of the story.

== Cast ==
- Rahman as Vijay
- Kanaka as Seetha
- R. Sarathkumar as Rathnaraj
- Gautami as Jhansi Rani
- Charan Raj as Boopathy
- Janagaraj as Boopathy's father
- Manorama as Boopathy's mother
- Radha Ravi as Chakravarthy
- S. Shankar as Japan
- Srividya as Meenakshi, Seetha's mother
- Delhi Ganesh as Nakkeeran, Seetha's father
- Yuvasri as Shanthi, Boopathy's sister
- Sharmili as Hams
- Super Subbarayan
- Chitti

== Soundtrack ==
The soundtrack was composed by Vidyasagar, with lyrics written by Vaali and Pulamaipithan.

Track listing
No.	Title	Lyrics	Singer(s)	Length
1.	"Aararo Aariraro"	Pulamaipithan	K. S. Chithra	2:41
2.	"Neram Kaalam"	Vaali	K. S. Chithra	3:56
3.	"Vidai Ariya"	Vaali	K. S. Chithra	3:32
4.	"Thene Thene"	Vaali	K. S. Chithra, Mano	4:00
5.	"Vechiko"	Vaali	Shoba Chandrasekhar	4:02
