= Thavarina Thottilu =

- VCD cover
- Directed by: S. Narayan
- Written by: Ajay Kumar
- Produced by: Bhagyavathi
- Starring: Ramkumar; Shruti; Charan Raj; Doddanna
- Cinematography: R. Giri
- Edited by: P. R. Soundar Raj
- Music by: Rajesh Ramanath
- Production company: Shanthala Pictures
- Release date: 29 March 1996
- Running time: 163 minutes
- Country: India
- Language: Kannada

Thavarina Thottilu (transl. The cradle of home) is a 1996 Indian Kannada-language drama film directed by S. Narayan and written by Ajay Kumar. The film cast includes Ramkumar, Charan Raj and Shruti. The film was produced by Narayan's home production while the original score and soundtrack were composed by Rajesh Ramanath. The film was remade in Tamil as Annan Thangachi directed by actor Charanraj who reprised his role along with Shruti.

== Cast ==
- Ramkumar as Bhaskara
- Shruti as Saraswathi
- Charan Raj as Bettappa
- Kavana as Yashoda
- Srinivasa Murthy as Bettappa and Saraswathi's father
- Padma Vasanthi as Bettappa and Saraswathi's mother
- Doddanna as Thimmayya, Bhaskara's father
- B. Jayamma as Parvathi, Bhaskara's mother
- Ashalatha as Yashoda's mother
- Rajanand as Javarappa
- Dr Suresh Sharma as Pachchalingayya aka Pachchai
- Gowtham
- Baby Mamasa
- Baby Pooja
- Ma Rakesh
- Ma Ankith

== Production ==
The film was shot in Karighatta.

== Soundtrack ==
The music of the film was composed by Rajesh Ramanath and lyrics written by S. Narayan.

Thavarina Thottilu

Soundtrack album by Rajesh Ramanath
- Released: 1996
- Genre: Feature film soundtrack
- Label: Jhankar Music

No.	Title	Lyrics	Singer(s)	Length
1.	"O Kusumave"	S. Narayan	Rajesh Krishnan, K. S. Chithra
2.	"Arishina Kuttiravva"	S. Narayan	S. P. Balasubrahmanyam, Gururaj Hoskote
3.	"Malenadina Minchina Balli"	S. Narayan	S. P. Balasubrahmanyam, K. S. Chithra
4.	"O Bombeye Dalimbeye"	S. Narayan	S. P. Balasubrahmanyam, K. S. Chithra
5.	"Brahma Bareda Haaleyalli"	S. Narayan	S. P. Balasubrahmanyam
6.	"Baaradu Barabaaradu"	S. Narayan	Gururaj Hoskote

== Reception ==
The film ran for a hundred days and Dr. Rajkumar felicitated the event. South First listed this film amongst the five best films of Shruti.
