= No 73, Shanthi Nivasa =

2007 Indian Kannada film by Sudeepa

- Directed by: Sudeepa
- Starring: Sudeep; Anu Prabhakar; Deepa
- Cinematography: Sri Venkat
- Edited by: B. S. Kemparaj
- Music by: Bharadwaj
- Production company: Kiccha Creations
- Release date: 15 June 2007
- Running time: 157 minutes
- Country: India
- Language: Kannada

No 73, Shanthi Nivasa is a 2007 Indian Kannada-language musical drama film directed by Sudeepa, starring him, Anu Prabhakar and Deepa. The film background score and soundtrack were composed by Bharadwaj and produced by Kiccha Creations. The film was released on 15 June 2007.

It is the latest remake of the 1966 Bengali-language film Galpo Holeo Satti, following the 1972 Hindi-language film Bawarchi, and an earlier Kannada version, Sakala Kala Vallabha.

== Synopsis ==
Shanthi Nivasa, commonly known as no.73 Shanthi Nivasa, is a large house with a number of selfish, quarrelsome, and peculiar residents, with the exception of Radha. The situation is so bad that one servant barely remains for a month. When Raghu enters the house as a cook, things begin to change as he imparts morals and values in each of them, which clears the smokescreen of misunderstandings that separate the relatives. Meanwhile, a lookout notice is given for a criminal who has escaped from prison and is skilled in stealing from houses after working as a servant, cook, music teacher, and dance teacher by gaining the trust of the respective family members. Although Raghu continues to impresses everyone with his vocabulary and multiple skills in dance, Sanskrit, and music, he secretly has eyes on the box of jewels and gold. Who is he and what are his intentions?

== Cast ==
- Sudeep as Raghu (Cook)/Rajeev Somasagar
- Anu Prabhakar as Neetha
- Deepa Bhaskar as Radha
- Master Hirannayya as Kailasanatha
- Srinivasa Murthy as Ramanath
- Ramesh Bhat as Kashinath
- Vaishali Kasaravalli as Seethadevi
- Chitra Shenoy as Shobha
- Komal as Vishwanath aka Gandharva
- Arun Sagar as Dance Guruji
- Rohit as Chintu
- Deepu as Arun
- Vishnuvardhan as Himself (guest role)
- Shiva Rajkumar as Himself (narrator artist)

== Soundtrack ==
#73, Shanthi Nivasa (2007)

Soundtrack album by Bharadwaj
- Released: 1 January 2009
- Genre: Feature film soundtrack
- Language: Kannada
- Label: Anand Audio
- Producer: Kiccha Creations

Bharadwaj chronology
Pirappu (2007)	#73, Shanthi Nivasa (2007) (2009)	Pallikoodam (2007)
External audio
- Official Audio Jukebox on YouTube

The music was composed by Bharadwaj.

No.	Title	Lyrics	Singer(s)	Length
1.	"Geeya Geeya Thirugo Bhoomi"	K. Kalyan	S. P. Balasubrahmanyam
2.	"Preethi Endare Heegene"	K. Kalyan	Rajesh Krishnan
3.	"Thayata Thayata"	K. Kalyan	Rajesh Krishnan and Kalyani
4.	"Adaddella Olledaytu"	K. Kalyan	Rajesh Krishnan, L. N. Shastri, Nanditha, Archana Udupa, Arun Sagar and Master Hirannayya
5.	"Hrudaya Hrudaya"	V. Nagendra Prasad	Srinivas
6.	"Preethi Endare Heegene"	K. Kalyan	Bharadwaj
7.	"Geeya Geeya Thirugo Bhoomi" (Remix)	K. Kalyan	S. P. Balasubrahmanyam
8.	"Ondu Olle Katheya Heluve"	K. Kalyan	Sudeep and Shivrajkumar
9.	"Bandu Nodu"	K. Kalyan	Bharadwaj

== Reception ==
R. G. Vijayasarathy of IANS wrote that "73, Shanthi Nivasa is a must watch for all the audience looking for good and meaningful cinema". A critic from Rediff.com wrote that "In these days of fast music, stereotyped dialogues and gory action sequences, a film like 73, Shanthi Nivasa is welcome".
