= Pooja Kanwal =

Indian actress

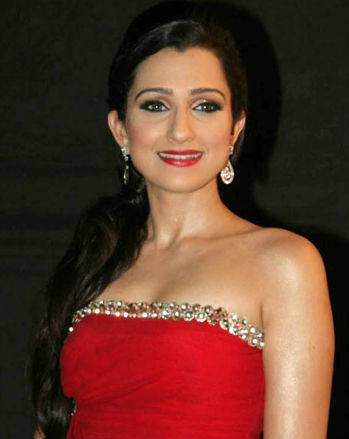
- Born: 24 January 1982 (age 44); India
- Occupations: Actress, Anchor
- Years active: 2004–present
- Spouse: Avinash Mahtani (m. 2009)

Pooja Kanwal Mahtani (born 24 January 1982) is an Indian actress who has worked predominantly in Kannada-language films and Hindi television. She played lead roles in the Kannada films Seven O' Clock and Tirupathi. She appeared in Palampur Express where she portrayed the lead role of Pawni. She is currently working with Aajtak & India Today Group.

== Personal life ==
She is a daughter of Anita Kanwal.

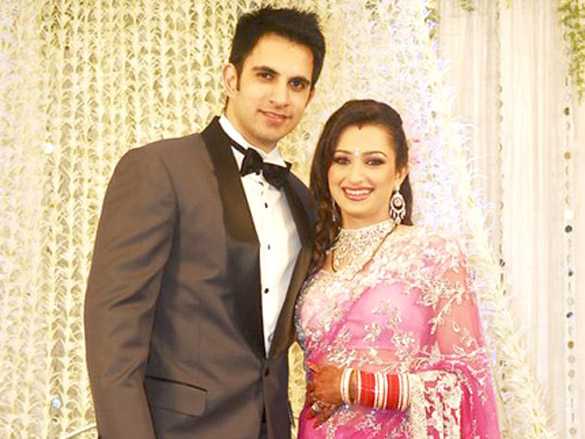
Pooja with husband Avinash on their marriage reception

On 6 November 2009 she married a Bandra-based jeweler, Avinash Mahtani.

== Filmography ==
=== Film ===
Year	Film	Role	Language	Ref.
2004	Uuf Kya Jaadoo Mohabbat Hai	Pari	Hindi	
2006	Seven O' Clock	Niveditha / Nithya / Neethu	Kannada	
2006	Tirupathi	Nandini	Kannada	
2006	Student		Kannada	
2007	Mein Ek Din Laut Kay Aaoon Ga	Sheeza	Urdu	
2009	Blue Oranges	Shalini	Hindi	
2010	Jawani Zindabaad	Prabhjot	Punjabi	
2010	Thipparalli Tharlegalu		Kannada	

=== Television ===
- Palampur Express as Paavni
- Sasural Genda Phool as Disha
- Rishtey (season 2)
- Na Bole Tum... Na Maine Kuch Kaha as Rashmi
- Hum Ne Li Hai- Shapath as Simran Kaur
- Sanskaar - Dharohar Apno Ki (season 2) as Deepika
- Gulmohar Grand as Mayuri Jaitley/Mayuri Mehta
- Saas Bahu Aur Betiyan as Host

=== Dubbing roles ===
Title	Actress	Character	Dubbed Language	Original Language	Original year release	Dubbed year release	Notes
Captain Marvel	Brie Larson	Carol Danvers / Vers / Captain Marvel	Hindi	English	2019	2019	
Avengers: Endgame	Brie Larson	Carol Danvers / Captain Marvel	Hindi	English	2019	2019	
