= Parakrami =

- Promotional poster
- Directed by: Vijay Deep
- Produced by: Vijay Chandra; Arvind A. Gediya; Bhagwanji Sindhwa
- Starring: Nutan; Mithun Chakraborty; Sangeeta Bijlani; Kader Khan; Kiran Kumar; Charan Raj; Sharat Saxena; Satish Shah; Tiku Talsania; Alok Nath
- Cinematography: Thomas A. Xavier
- Music by: Laxmikant–Pyarelal
- Running time: 145 minutes
- Country: India
- Language: Hindi

Parakrami is an Indian unreleased Hindi-language film directed by Vijay Deep, starring Nutan, Mithun Chakraborty, Sangeeta Bijlani, Kader Khan, Kiran Kumar, Charan Raj, Sharat Saxena, Satish Shah, Tiku Talsania and Alok Nath.

The film was supposed to get released in 1991, but to date remains unreleased. Promos from the film were seen on television at the time it was supposed to be released.

== Summary ==
Parakrami is the story of a mother and her son, played by Nutan and Mithun Chakraborty respectively. Mithun's love interest is Sangeeta Bijlani. Mother has a dream and she hopes her son to fulfill the same, but some evil minds already has other ideas. Whether the son is able to fulfill his mother's dream, form the climax.

== Cast ==
- Nutan
- Mithun Chakraborty
- Sangeeta Bijlani
- Kader Khan
- Kiran Kumar
- Charan Raj
- Sharat Saxena
- Satish Shah
- Tiku Talsania
- Alok Nath
- Kunickaa Sadanand

== Music ==
The soundtrack was composed by Laxmikant–Pyarelal and the lyrics written by Anjaan

1. "Gunahon Ki" - Amit Kumar, Kavita Krishnamurthy
2. "Neta Ki Sawari Hai" - Amit Kumar, Kavita Krishnamurthy
3. "Jab Tune Kehdi Haan" - Amit Kumar, Alka Yagnik
4. "O Jaaniya" - Amit Kumar, Alisha Chinai
5. "Aankh Sharma Rahi Hai" - Suresh Wadkar, Sadhana Sargam
