= Charan Raj =

Indian film director and actor (born 1958)

- Born: Brahmananda; 27 April 1958 (age 68); Belagavi, Mysore State, India
- Occupations: Actor, film director, producer, screenwriter
- Years active: 1982–present
- Spouse: Kalpana Charanraj
- Children: 3, including Tej Charanraj

Charan Rajkumar is an Indian actor, director, film producer, and writer who works predominately in Kannada, Tamil, Telugu, Hindi, and Malayalam films.

== Career ==
Charan Raj is a versatile actor who is popular for his villainy and character roles in South Indian film industry. Charanraj started his movie career with Kannada movie Parajitha (1982) directed by Siddalingaiah which became commercially hit cinema.

Charan Raj is not only an actor, but a producer, music composer and director too. He is popular for his villainy roles in Telugu film industry starting his career in Telugu with Pratighatana (1985), Indrudu Chandrudu (1989) and Karthavyam (1990). He has also acted with Rajinikanth in the Hindi movie Phool Bane Angaray (1991) and Tamil films like Panakkaran (1990), Dharma Dorai (1991), Pandian (1992), Veera (1994) and Baashha (1995). His character role in Tamil film Gentleman (1993) showed him as a different Charan Raj and he got good applause for his performance in that film.

He made his debut as a director in 1999, through the film Annan Thangachi. In this film he acted as the hero as well as did the direction. The film did not perform well at th box office. He has also acted as Suriya’s father in the film Vel (2007) with Saranya Ponvannan as his pair.

After wowing the audiences in negative roles, Charan has signed the Kannada film Sorry Kane (2014).

In 2023, Charan Raj played in the Telegu movie Narakasura.

== Controversy ==
In 2014, Charan Raj was accused of carrying a gun at Sri Varasiddhi Vinayak Temple, Andhra Pradesh. However, he apologised for the incident.

== Partial filmography ==
=== Kannada ===
- Parajitha (1982)
- Aasha (1983)
- Thayiya Nudi (1983)
- Hosa Theerpu (1983)
- Manege Banda Mahalakshmi (1983)
- Prema Parva (1983)
- Samarpane (1983)
- Dharma Yuddha (1983)
- Shubha Muhurtha (1984)
- Thaliya Bhagya (1984)
- Guru Bhakthi (1984)
- Dharma (1984)
- Thayi Nadu (1984)
- Odeda Halu (1984)
- Shapatha (1984)
- Thayi Kanasu (1985)
- Kumkuma Thanda Sowbhagya (1985)
- Pralaya Rudra (1985)
- Thayiya Hone (1985)
- Maruthi Mahime (1985)
- Vajra Mushti (1985)
- Sanchu (1986)
- Thavaru Mane (1986)
- Tiger (1986)
- Henne Ninagenu Bandhana (1986)
- Africadalli Sheela (1986)
- Namma Oora Devathe (1986)
- Hrudaya Pallavi (1987)
- Aase (1987)
- Nyayakke Shikshe (1987)
- Kurukshethra (1987)
- Justice Rajendra (1988)
- Namma Bhoomi (1989)
- Mana Gedda Maga (1992)
- Jwala (1993)
- Gandhada Gudi Part 2 (1994)
- Shravana Sanje (1995)
- Nighatha (1995)
- Samara (1995)
- Rambo Raja Revolver Rani (1996)
- Thavarina Thottilu (1996)
- GodFather (1996)
- Annavra Makkalu (1996)
- Honey Moon (1997)
- Yuddha (1997)
- Kalyani (1997)
- CBI Durga (1997)
- Thayavva (1997)
- Mahabharatha (1997)
- Dayadi (1998)
- Om Shakthi (1999)
- Soorappa (2000)
- Papigala Lokadalli (2000)
- Nee Nanna Jeeva (2000)
- Kadlimatti Station Master (2000)
- Brahma Vishnu (2001)
- Mafia (2001)
- Kanoonu (2001)
- Supari (2001)
- Amma Nagamma (2001)
- Boothayyana Makkalu (2002)
- Aathma (2002)
- Annayya Thammayya (2002)
- Daddy No. 1 (2002)
- Nammoora Yajamana (2002)
- Police Officers (2002)...Inspector Jayasimha
- Commissioner Narasimha (2002)
- Border (2003)
- Sri Renukadevi (2003)
- Ondagona Baa (2003)
- Love ve Pasagali (2003)
- Pandava (2004)...Jagadish
- Real Rowdy (2004)
- Hendthi Andre Hendthi (2004)
- Gadipar (2005)
- Thirupathi (2006)
- Ma Neenello Nanalle (2007)
- Mr. Theertha (2010)
- Swayam Krushi (2011)
- Raja Huli (2013)
- Sorry Kane (2014)
- Rathaavara (2015)
- Nigooda Rahasya (2015)
- Preethiya Raayabhari (2018)
- Gadinaadu (2020)
- Berklee (2021)
- Ek Love Ya (2022)
- Agnyathavasi (2025)

=== Tamil ===
- Neethikku Thandanai (1987)
- Sakkarai Panthal (1988)
- Sudhanthira Naattin Adimaigal (1988)
- Poovum Puyalum (1988)
- Kazhugumalai Kallan (1988)
- Poovukkul Boogambam (1988)
- Sigappu Thali (1988)
- Naan Sonnathey Sattam (1988)
- Kalicharan (1988)
- Adhu Antha Kaalam (1988)
- Kuttravali (1989)
- Karunguyil Kundram (1989)
- Sattathin Marupakkam (1989)
- Rajanadai (1989)
- Panakkaran (1990)
- Seetha (1990)
- Adhisaya Manithan (1990)
- Pudhu Pudhu Ragangal (1990)
- Dharma Durai (1991)
- Sirai Kathavukal (1991)
- Vaidehi Vanthachu (1991)
- Pandian (1992)
- Manikuyil (1993)
- Vedan (1993)
- Gentleman (1993)
- Veera (1994)
- Baashha (1995)
- Nethaji (1996)
- Arasiyal (1997)
- Ethirum Puthirum (1999)
- Annan Thangachi (1999)
- Rajakali Amman (2000)
- Palayathu Amman (2000)
- Nee Enthan Vaanam (2000)
- Arul (2004)
- Arasatchi (2004)
- Ayodhya (2005)
- Ji (2005)
- Pon Megalai (2005)
- Aacharya (2006)
- Oru Ponnu Oru Paiyan (2007)
- Nam Naadu (2007)
- Vel (2007)
- Thotta (2008)
- Kadhal Endral Enna (2008)
- Kee Mu (2008)
- Kai (2012)
- Aghavan (2019)
- Hitler (2024)
- Varunan (2025)
- Rambo (2025)

=== Telugu ===
- Pratighatana (1985)
- Kotigadu (1986)
- Aranyakanda (1986)
- Mr. Bharath (1986)
- America Abbayi (1987)
- Donga Mogudu (1988)
- Sankharavam (1987)
- Swayamkrushi (1987)
- Asthulu Anthasthulu (1988)
- Jeevana Ganga (1988)
- Rajakeeya Chadarangam (1989)
- Bhale Donga (1989)
- Black Tiger (1989)
- Indrudu Chandrudu (1989)
- Maa Inti Katha (1990)
- Karthavyam (1990)
- Seetha (1990)
- Stuvartpuram Dongalu (1991)
- Surya IPS (1991)
- Ganga (1991)
- Police Encounter (1991)
- Nani (1992)
- Aasayam (1993)
- Gaayam (1993)
- President Gari Alludu (1994)
- Hello Brother (1994)
- Palnati Pourusham (1994)
- Police Brothers (1994)
- Yes Nenante Nene (1994)
- Amma Donga (1995)
- Chilakapachcha Kaapuram (1995)
- Lady Boss (1995)
- Telugu Veera Levara (1995)
- Muddayi Muddugumma (1995)
- Peddannayya (1997)
- Egire Paavurama (1997)
- Yuvarathna Rana (1998)
- Suryudu (1998)
- Vamsoddharakudu (2000)
- Adavi Chukka (2000)
- Naa Alludu (2005)
- Athadu (2005)
- Asadhyudu (2006)
- Current (2009)
- Em Pillo Em Pillado (2010)
- Puli (2010)
- Parama Veera Chakra (2011)
- Amayakudu (2011)
- Adhinayakudu (2012)
- Yadartha Prema Katha (2012)
- Paisa (2014)
- Narakasura (2023)
- Operation Raavan (2024)

=== Hindi ===
- Pratighaat (1987)
- Sheela (1987)
- Kudrat Ka Kanoon (1987)
- Kahan Hai Kanoon (1989)
- Phool Bane Angaray (1991)
- Hafta Bandh (1991)
- Parakrami (1991)
- I Love You (1992)
- Police Aur Mujrim (1992)
- Tejasvini (1994)
- Mafia (1996)
- Husn Ke Lootere (2001)

=== Malayalam ===
- Oliyampukal (1990)
- Lelam (1997)
- Red Indians (1999)
- India Gate (2002)
- Pokkiri Raja (2010)
- Madhura Raja (2019)

=== Other languages ===
- Jaa Devi Sarva Bhuteshu (1989; Odia)
- Nyaya Chakra (1989; Bengali)

=== Television ===
Year	Series	Role	Language	Notes
2023	Label	Murugesan	Tamil	

=== Director ===
- Annan Thangachi (1999)
- Yadartha Prema Katha (2012)
- Kuppan (2024)

== Awards ==
- Nandi Award for Best Villain - Pratighatana (1985)
