= Aati Rahengi Baharein =

- Genre: Drama
- Developed by: Radheshyam Rai
- Written by: Vipul Mehta; Jayesh Patil; Dilip Rawal (Dialogues)
- Directed by: Apoorva Acharya; Arvind Babbal
- Starring: see below
- Opening theme: "Aati Rahengi Baharein" by Amit Kumar
- Country of origin: India
- Original language: Hindi
- No. of seasons: 1
- No. of episodes: 118

Production
- Producers: Reena Wadhwa; Prem Kishan
- Editor: Kshitija Dhavale
- Running time: 22 minutes
- Production company: Cinevistaas Limited

Original release
- Network: Zee TV
- Release: 9 September 2002 – 26 March 2003

Aati Rahengi Baharein is an Indian television drama series that aired on Zee TV channel on 9 September 2002. The story focused on the concept of unselfish friendship and emotional bonding between friends who are from different social backgrounds.

== Plot ==
The story revolves around the life of Dr. Amar Sanghani, the son of a businessman who owns a garment shop. While the father is proud of his son's achievements, the mother influenced by how her brother feels about a businessman's son becoming a businessman, is uncaring for her son's prestigious degree. Besides focusing on Amar, the series is also about Amar's two best friends', Paddy and Milind, with whom he shares a close bond since childhood despite them belonging to different stratas of society. Amar's life takes an unfortunate turn when he finds out that he is suffering from a deadly disease which is incurable. Amar then takes a decision and cuts out everyone he cares and love for from his life, so when he leaves no one would miss him.

== Cast ==
- Dilip Thadeshwar as Dr. Amar Sanghani
- Pooja Ghai Rawal as Rashmi, Amar's love interest
- Sushmita Daan as Madhu, Amar's childhood friend and one-sided lover
- Nikita Thukral as Aarti, Amar's younger sister
- Muni Jha as Chandulal Sanghani, Amar's father
- Ragini Shah as Kokila Sanghani, Amar's mother
- Randeep Shekhawat as Milind
- Rajeev Paul as Paddy
- Jaya Mathur as Anjali, Amar's elder sister
- Yatin Karyekar as Dr. Sahni
