= Rajesh Ramanath =

- Born: Chennai, Tamil Nadu, India
- Occupation: Music director
- Years active: 1995–2017; 2023–present

Rajesh Ramanath is an Indian film score and soundtrack composer. He has scored music for Kannada films.

== Career ==
Rajesh Ramanath debuted as a music composer in 1995 for the film Shubha Lagna and has composed for over several commercial and critically acclaimed feature films.

Some of Rajesh Ramanath's notable works are Annavra Makkalu (1996), Thavarina Thottilu (1996), Veerappa Nayaka (1999), Yajamana (2000), Huchha (2001), Swathi Muthu (2004), Aishwarya (2005), My Autograph (2006) among others. Rajesh Ramanath was nominated for Filmfare Best Music Director award for Huchcha and Vaalee. He has also acted in a Kannada feature film Black & White (2003) as a lead actor.

After 2013, he worked on many low key films. He took a hiatus after 2017 before returning with the unreleased Kaddu Muchchi in 2023.

== Discography ==
Year	Film title	Notes
1995	Shubha Lagna	
1995	Lady Police	
1996	Thavarina Thottilu	
1996	Vasantha Kavya	
1996	Annavra Makkalu	
1996	Aadithya	
1998	Baaro Nanna Muddina Krishna	
1998	Bhama Satyabhama	
1998	Jaidev	
1998	Maari Kannu Hori Myage	
1999	Kubera	
1999	Veerappa Nayaka	
1999	Z	2 songs
2000	Latest the album	
2000	Andhra Hendthi	
2000	Yajamana	Reused six songs from Vaanathaippola
2000	Bhagawan Dada	
2000	Jeevana Raaga	
2000	Nan Hendthi Chennagidale	
2001	Huchha	Reused four songs from Sethu
2001	Kanasugara	Reused songs from Unnidathil Ennai Koduthen and Kannupada Poguthaiya
2001	Sundari Neenu Sundaran Naanu	
2001	Natchatra Kadhal	Tamil film
2001	Neelambari	
2001	Vaalee	Reused songs from Vaalee (1999)
2002	Manasella Neene	Reused four songs from Manasantha Nuvve
2002	Ninne Preethisuve	Reused songs from Nee Varuvai Ena and Maayi
2002	Nuvvunte Chalu	Telugu film
2003	Ananda	Reused songs from Anandam
2003	Black & White	
2003	Pratidhwani	
2003	Badri	also cameo in song "Bannada Loka"
2003	Kushalave Kshemave	Reused four songs from Kaalamellam Kadhal Vaazhga
2003	Vikram	The song "Ramarasa Na" is based on "Aata Kaavala" from Annayya; The song "Enagide Nanageedina" based on "Mushkil Bada Yeh Pyaar Hai" from Gupt; The song "Avale Avale" is based on "Uyire Urave" from Anbin Mugavari
2003	Khaki	
2003	Mani	
2003	Annavru	Reused three songs from Thalapathi
2004	Rowdy Aliya	Guest composer
2004	Naari Munidare Gandu Parari	
2004	Bhagawan	
2004	Ajju	
2004	Pakkadmane Hudugi	Reused three songs from Padosan
2004	Sahukara	Reused songs from Muthu
2004	Swathi Muthu	Reused songs from Swathi Muthyam
2006	Aishwarya	
2006	Julie	Reused songs from Julie (1975)
2006	Tirupathi	
2006	Good Luck	
2006	Nidhi	
2006	Ravi Shastri	
2006	My Autograph	Background Music only
2007	Parodi	
2007	VIP 5	
2007	Jambada Hudugi	
2007	Nali Naliyutha	
2007	Kaada Beladingalu	
2007	Agrahara	
2007	Snehanjali	
2008	Varasdhaara	
2008	Premigagi Naa	
2009	Minchu	Reused songs from Thimiru
2009	Kencha	
2010	Minugu	Background score only
2010	Kiladi Krishna	
2011	Chenamma IPS	
2011	Obavva	
2012	Magadi	
2012	Godfather	Background score only
2012	12AM Madhyarathri	Background score only
2012	Hosa Prema Purana	
2013	Gajendra	
2013	Mangana Kaiyalli Manikya	
2013	Chatrapathi	Background score only
2014	Ragini IPS	Background score only
2014	Sachin! Tendulkar Alla	
2014	Nage Bomb	
2014	Huccha Venkat	
2015	Preethiyinda	
2015	Bettanagere	
2016	Jai Tulunadu	Tulu film
2016	Sakkath Risk	
2016	Golisoda	
2017	Style Raja	
2023	Kanna Muchi	Film unreleased
