= Thayavva =

- Directed by: V. Umakanth
- Written by: B. Suresha (dialogues)
- Screenplay by: Ma Ra Shanmuga Sundaram
- Story by: A. L. Abbaiah Naidu
- Produced by: A. L. Abbaiah Naidu
- Starring: Sudeep; Umashree; Charan Raj; Sindhu
- Cinematography: Sundarnath Suvarna
- Edited by: S. Prasad
- Music by: V. Manohar
- Production company: Madhu Art Studios (P)Ltd.,
- Release date: 5 September 1997
- Running time: 134 min
- Country: India
- Language: Kannada

Thayavva is a 1997 Kannada-language film directed by V. Umakanth, starring Sudeep, Umashree, Charan Raj and Sindhu. The background score and soundtrack were composed by V. Manohar, with lyrics by V. Manohar and Geethapriya. This was Sudeep's first film to release after his two previous films were abandoned midway. The film was a box office failure.

== Cast ==
- Sudeep as Raamu
- Umashree as Thayavva
- Charan Raj
- Sindhu
- Avinash
- Ramesh Bhat
- Harish Rai
- Tennis Krishna
- Bank Janardhan
- A. L. Abbaiah Naidu

== Production ==
Sudeep who went on to become a famous star in the Kannada film industry, he made his acting debut with this film. This was the last film produced by A. L. Abbaiah Naidu before his death.

== Soundtrack ==
The music was composed by V. Manohar and released by Lahari Music.

Thayavva

Soundtrack album by V. Manohar
- Released: 1997
- Recorded: 1997
- Genre: Soundtrack
- Length: 29:10
- Label: Lahari Music
- Producer: V. Manohar

V. Manohar chronology
O Mallige (1997)	Thayavva (1997)	Akka (1997)

Track list
No.	Title	Lyrics	Singer(s)	Length
1.	"Preethi Daiva"	V. Manohar	S. P. Balasubrahmanyam	4:05
2.	"Kelale O Rambha"	V. Manohar	S. P. Balasubrahmanyam	4:17
3.	"Olava Mayuri"	Geethapriya	S. P. Balasubrahmanyam	4:16
4.	"O Basanthi"	V. Manohar	S. P. Balasubrahmanyam, B. R. Chaya	3:35
5.	"Aali Pathre"	V. Manohar	L. N. Shastri, Bali	4:26
6.	"Premigale"	C. V. Shivashankar	Ramesh Chandra	4:25
7.	"Zoolemma"	V. Manohar	S. P. Balasubrahmanyam	4:06
Total length:				29:10
