= Magadi (film) =

- Theatrical release poster
- Directed by: K Suresh Goswamy
- Starring: Deepak; Rakshitha
- Cinematography: S Ramesh
- Edited by: N M Vishwa
- Music by: Rajesh Ramanath
- Release date: 16 March 2012
- Country: India
- Language: Kannada

Magadi is a 2012 Indian Kannada-language directed by Abhishek KS starring Deepak and Rakshitha. The feature film is produced by Ba. Ma. Harish and B. M. Diwakar Gowda and the music composed by Rajesh Ramanath. It was theatrically released on 16 March 2012.

== Cast ==
- Deepak as Magadi
- Rakshitha as Pavithra
- Amith
- Ravi
- Rangatheja
- Mahesh
- Gopi
- Suresh Chandra
- Ramesh Pandith
- Uyyale Shilpa
- Mysore Mallesh
- Jayashree
- Krishna
- Padma Vasanthi
- M. S. Umesh

== Reception ==
A reviewer of Prajavani says "Rajesh Ramnath's music lacks freshness even though he has given a couple of catchy songs. The fact that the songs were shot on waterlogged roads instead of the beautiful locations of Bangkok reflects the lack of taste on the part of the director and cinematographer". A reviewer of The Times of India wrote "While Deepak shows a lot of promise, Rakshithaa's role doesnat offer much. But Is Anushri (Mukta Mukta fame) who impresses you with lively performance. Rajesh Ramanath too shines with a couple of catchy numbers". A reviewer of News18 India wrote "Even the characterisation of the hero and heroine is not well defined. As for the other characters, most of them shout in all the sequences - the director seems to have allowed them full freedom to do whatever they feel like".
