= Maharaja (2005 film) =

- VCD cover
- Directed by: Om Sai Prakash
- Screenplay by: B.A. Madhu; M.S. Abhishesh
- Story by: B.A. Madhu
- Produced by: R.S. Gowda
- Starring: Sudeep; Nikita Thukral
- Cinematography: H.C. Venu
- Edited by: P.R. Soundarraj
- Music by: S. A. Rajkumar
- Release date: 14 January 2005
- Running time: 154 min
- Country: India
- Language: Kannada

Maharaja is a 2005 Indian Kannada-language family drama film directed by Om Sai Prakash featuring Sudeep and Nikita Thukral in the lead roles. The film features background score and soundtrack composed by S. A. Rajkumar and lyrics by K. Kalyan and V. Nagendra Prasad. The film released on 14 January 2005.

== Plot ==
A married couple have a child and they adopt a child (Sudeep). However, their own son starts to feel vengeful about his adopted brother.

== Cast ==
- Sudeep as Surya
- Nikita Thukral as Sitara
- Bharathi Vishnuvardhan as Annapoorna (Surya's mother)
- Ashok as Rajashekar (Surya's father)
- Avinash as Vishakantayya
- Doddanna as Kithapathi Naaga
- Tennis Krishna as Gunjappa
- Sundar Raj as Surya's uncle
- Dharma as Surya's brother-in-law
- Adarsh as Kiran (Surya's brother)
- Bharath Bhagavathar as Surya's brother
- Aravind as Surya's brother
- Baby Priyanka
- Baby Prathiksha
- Master Kishan
- Amulya

== Soundtrack ==
Maharaja

Soundtrack album by S. A. Rajkumar
- Genre: Feature film soundtrack
- Language: Kannada
External audio
- Official Audio Jukebox on YouTube

Soundtrack was composed by S. A. Rajkumar. "Kandamma Kandamma" song reused From "Chaamanthi Poobanthi" from Telugu film Puttintiki Ra Chelli.

No.	Title	Lyrics	Singer(s)	Length
1.	"Chukku Bukku"	K. Kalyan	Malathi	04:05
2.	"Gopala Gopala"	V. Nagendra Prasad	Rajesh, Kalpana	04:41
3.	"Hettavaru Beku"	V. Nagendra Prasad	S. A. Rajkumar	04:12
4.	"Kandamma Kandamma"	K. Kalyan	K. S. Chithra	01:21
5.	"Kandamma Kandamma"	K. Kalyan	K. S. Chithra	05:45
6.	"Kuni Kunu"	K. Kalyan	Rajesh	05:16
7.	"Santheya Beediyalli"	V. Nagendra Prasad	Rajesh, Manjula Gururaj	04:51

== Reception ==
Film critic R. G. Vijayasarathy of IANS wrote that "Director Sai Prakash's latest offering "Maharaja" is made in the mould of a 1960s south Indian melodrama - like many of his earlier films". A critic from Viggy wrote that "If you like to see Sudeep only as an action hero, Maharaja is not for you!" S. N. Deepak of Deccan Herald wrote "Director Sai Prakash has effectively handled the story which revolves around family values. He has taken care not to glorify the mannerisms of Sudeep and included a number of sentimental scenes, comedy episodes (without double meaning) and action scenes in the film. Sudeep does a great job". Music India Online wrote "Why Sudeep has accepted this type of subject? Has he really gone bankrupt? Or is he looking for money but not good roles? This is not a film for his caliber. This is an out and out tearjerker. In Kannada many such stories have come and gone".

== Awards ==
Awards and nominations
Award	Wins	Nominations
Karnataka State Film Awards	1	0
- Totals
Awards won	1
Nominations	0

Karnataka State Film Awards :-

- Best Female Playback Singer - K.S. Chitra
