= Care of Footpath 2 =

2015 film

- Film poster
- Directed by: Kishan Shrikanth
- Written by: Kishan Shrikanth; Shyam Prasad; Srikanth H R
- Produced by: Devaraj Pande; C R Srinivas; Srikanth H R
- Starring: Kishan Shrikanth; Avika Gor; Deepp Pathak; Dingri Naresh; Karthik Jayaram; Esha Deol
- Cinematography: Makesh Dev; S K Rao
- Edited by: Kishan SS
- Music by: Songs: Vivek Kar; Manoj Srihari; Kishan Shrikanth; Score: Kishan Shrikanth
- Production company: Kiran Movie Makers Inc.
- Release dates: 6 November 2015 (US); 4 December 2015 (India)
- Running time: 133 minutes
- Country: India
- Languages: Kannada; Hindi

Care of Footpath 2 (Hindi: Kill Them Young) is a 2015 Indian bilingual drama film directed by Kishan Shrikanth and produced by Devaraj Pande. In addition to direction, Kishan has composed music, enacted and edited the film. The film is a sequel to Kishan's Care of Footpath (2006) which won him many laurels. The film also stars Avika Gor, Deepp Pathak, Dingri Naresh, and Karthik Jayaram and Esha Deol. The film also features special performances from Bollywood personalities such as Shafiq Syed of Salaam Bombay! fame, director Anees Bazmee apart from Mandeep Roy. The film examines the Indian legal system through the trial of four juveniles who hatch a plan to kill a corrupt police officer.

Care of Footpath 2 premiered in Los Angeles on 6 November 2015 prior to its release in India.

== Cast ==
- Kishan Shrikanth as Krishna
- Avika Gor as Geetha
- Deepp Pathak as Viji
- Dingri Naresh as Dingri
- Karthik Jayaram as Inspector Karthik
- Esha Deol as Meera
- Shivaram as Ramanna
- Padma Vasanthi as Krishna's mother

== Production ==
After a gap of four years, director Kishan Shrikanth came up with the idea of making a sequel to his first installment Care of Footpath. Terming the film as "not a typical sequel", the director said it took three years to conceive and conceptualize the subject for the film. He visited the real street children who had their brush with crime and understood their plight which resulted him to form a screenplay.

== Soundtrack ==
Care of Footpath 2

Soundtrack album by Vivek Kar, Manoj Srihari, Kishan Shrikanth
- Released: 3 November 2015
- Genre: Feature film soundtrack
- Length: 19:01
- Label: Anand Audio

The soundtrack album comprises five tracks including three instrumentals, and was composed by 3 composers: Vivek Kar, Manoj Srihari and Kishan Shrikanth. It was released on 3 November 2015.

=== Track listing ===
No.	Title	Lyrics	Music	Singer(s)	Length
1.	"Bullet Nanna"	Raghu Niduvalli	Vivek Kar	Girik Aman, Shipra Goyal	4:27
2.	"Kanasugala"	K. Kalyan	Manoj Srihari & Kishan Shrikanth	Santhosh Venky	4:07
3.	"Good Times"		Kishan Shrikanth	Instrumental	3:27
4.	"Last Hope"		Kishan Shrikanth	Instrumental	2:51
5.	"Plan to Kill"		Kishan Shrikanth	Instrumental	4:09
Total length:					19:01

== Reception ==
=== Critical response ===
==== International ====
On 5 November 2015, the Los Angeles Times reviewed the film as "an exercise in excess" and drew parallels of the film making style to that of Danny Boyle's films. The film criticized the plot as a "bombastic, overlong melodrama that doesn't recognize the occasional need to takes things down a decibel or three" while praising the lead performances.

==== In India ====
Upon release in India, the film garnered critical reviews with the Bangalore Mirror rating the film 3.5 Stars quoting 'From beginning to end, the movie does not let you down with its fast narrative and constant entry and exit of characters.'
