= Nalla =

2004 film directed by V. Nagendra Prasad

- VCD cover
- Directed by: V. Nagendra Prasad
- Written by: V. Nagendra Prasad
- Produced by: Kavya; Shreyas; Spurthy
- Starring: Sudeep; Sangeetha
- Cinematography: R. Giri
- Edited by: Rajashekar Reddy
- Music by: Venkat Narayan
- Production company: Sri Bhuvaneshwari Chithra
- Release date: 12 November 2004
- Country: India
- Language: Kannada

Nalla is a 2004 Kannada-language romance-drama film directed by V. Nagendra Prasad in his directorial debut featuring Sudeep and Sangeetha in the lead roles. The film features background score and soundtrack composed by Venkat Narayan. The film released on 12 November 2004. This movie was dubbed in Hindi as Aur Ek Diljala.

The core plot of the movie is loosely based on the 1982 Tamil movie Moondram Pirai which itself was heavily inspired by Charlie Chaplin's City Lights.

== Plot ==
Pachchi alias Prashant (Sudeep) finds a girl, Preethi (Sangeetha), who has lost her memory, in a car. Prashant falls in love with her. He takes care of her and admits her to a hospital. When in the hospital, her father finds her and takes her home. He thanks him and gives a driver's job.

Preethi regains her memory and starts looking for Prashant. One day Preethi meets with an accident and is taken to the hospital. Prashant reveals himself and saves her.

== Cast ==
- Sudeep as Prashanth "Pachhi"
- Sangeetha as Preethi / Chinnu
- Mumtaj as Madhu
- Srinath as Preethi's father
- Naveen Mayur as Srikanth
- Bullet Prakash as Paachi's friend
- Dharma as gangster
- Harish Rai as gangster
- Lakshman as Police Inspector
- Ramesh Pandith as Police Inspector
- Bank Janardhan as Madhu's father
- Apoorva
- Chitra Shenoy
- Tara as Dr Sarala Desai

== Production ==
The film is produced by producer KCN Gowda's three grandchildren. The film was shot for fifteen days in Chennai, including the climax scene shot at AVM Studios, and Bangalore.

== Soundtrack ==
The film features background score and soundtrack composed by Venkat Narayan and lyrics by V. Nagendra Prasad.

Nalla

Soundtrack album by Venkat Narayan
- Genre: Feature film soundtrack
- Language: Kannada
External audio
- Official Audio Jukebox on YouTube

No.	Title	Singer(s)	Length
1.	"Nijana Nijana"	Srinivas, Lakshmi Nataraj
2.	"Macha Dove Hodiyod"	Sudeep
3.	"Malage Malage Gubbimari"	Rajesh Krishnan
4.	"Huchchu Prithi"	Udit Narayan
5.	"Mallige Mallige"	Tippu, Malathi
6.	"Gap Chup"	P. Unnikrishnan, Harini
7.	"Huduga Elli Neenu"	Nanditha

== Reception ==
A critic from Sify wrote that "This is a well made film to suit the image of Sudeep". Film critic R. G. Vijayasarathy of IANS wrote that "Nalla is a welcome relief for filmgoers looking for clean films". SND of Deccan Herald wrote "The story reminds us of Moonram Pirai and other successful Tamil films. The new formula for Kannada film makers seem to be: Take ideas from some successful films, remix them, write your own story, and make it appear new".
