= 7 O' Clock =

2006 Kannada romance film

- Directed by: Santosh Rai Pathaje
- Written by: Santosh Rai Pathaje
- Produced by: N M Suresh
- Starring: Mithun Tejaswi; Pooja Kanwal; Langis Fernandez; Nithya
- Cinematography: K S Chandrashekhar; Guruprashanth P Rai
- Edited by: B S Kemparaj
- Music by: M S Madhukar
- Production company: Sri Thulaja Bhavani Creations
- Release date: 10 February 2006
- Running time: 139 minutes
- Country: India
- Language: Kannada

7 O' Clock is a 2006 Indian Kannada romance film directed by Santosh Rai Pathaje and starring Mithun Tejaswi, Pooja Kanwal, Langis Fernandez and Nithya. Reportedly inspired by the 1995 films Beladingala Baale and Kadhal Kottai, the film was released to mixed to positive reviews but was a box office failure.

== Cast ==
- Mithun Tejaswi as Rahul
- Pooja Kanwal as Niveditha/Nithya/Neethu
- Langis Fernandez as Sneha (credited as Sneha)
- Nithya as Anu
- Dileep Raj as Ajay (guest appearance)
- Komal Kumar
- Bhavya as Rahul's mother
- Ramakrishna as Rahul's father
- Sundar Raj as Nithya and Anu's father
- Malathi Sardeshpande as Nithya and Anu's mother
- Sharan as Rahul's friend
- Rangayana Raghu
- Bank Janardhan as Train Ticket Collector
- M. S. Umesh as Rahul's uncle
- Vaijanath Biradar as Beggar
- Sridhar as Upendra
- Baby Shrisha as Rahul's sister

== Production ==
The director Santhosh Rai Pathaje worked as a cinematographer for Mithayi Mane (2005) and Mata (2006) and under R. P. Patnaik. This film marks the lead Kannada debuts of Mithun Tejaswi, Pooja Kanwal, choreographer Langis Fernandez and Nithya Menen. Some scenes and songs were shot in Goa.

== Soundtrack ==
All the songs are composed and scored by M. S. Madhukar. Anil Kumble, Ravichandran and Ramachandra Gowda attended the film's audio launch at The Club in Bangalore.

7 O' Clock track listing
#	Song title	Singer(s)	Lyricist
1	"Sanje Suryane"	Anuradha Sriram	K. Kalyan
2	"Ee Lokavannu"	K. S. Chithra	K. Ram Narayan
3	"Bhoolokava No No"	Tippu	K. Ram Narayan
4	"Kannige Kaanada"	Shankar Mahadevan	K. Kalyan
5	"Ee Dina Kushiyagide"	Rajesh Krishnan, Nithya Santhoshini	K. Ram Narayan
6	"Arere Jinkemari"	Mano, Swarnalatha	Kaviraj

== Reception ==
Film critic R. G. Vijayasarathy of IANS wrote that "At one stroke 7'O Clock can be dismissed as a boring film except for the last twenty minutes. But style of script, it has to be discussed in length. A critic from Chitraloka.com wrote that "This is a very pleasant film". S. N. Deepak of the Deccan Herald wrote "The first half is lively with funny episodes and blossoming of love while the second half takes twists and turns. Except the loss of memory of the hero and the coma in the climax, the film is neat. A considerable number of scenes have been shot in train, may be the first of its kind in Kannada. Songs and dialogues are good. Some songs and scenes have been shot in Goa". A critic from Sify wrote, "Debutant director Santosh Rai Pathaje has reworked the old film 'Beladingala Baale ' that had come a decade ago and managed to make this film which is good in parts".
