= My Autograph =

- DVD Cover
- Directed by: Sudeep
- Story by: Cheran
- Based on: Autograph (Tamil) (2004) by Cheran
- Produced by: Sudeep
- Starring: Sudeep; Meena; Sridevika; Deepu; Rashmi Kulkarni
- Cinematography: Sri Venkat
- Edited by: Jo Ni Harsha
- Music by: Bharadwaj; Rajesh Ramanath (BGM)
- Production company: Kiccha Creations
- Release date: 17 February 2006
- Country: India
- Language: Kannada
- Budget: ₹3 crore (US$310,000)

My Autograph is a 2006 Kannada-language romantic drama film which was directed, produced and enacted by Sudeep in his first directorial venture. Along with him, this film starred Meena, Sridevika, Deepu, and Rashmi Kulkarni. This film is a remake of Tamil film Autograph, which was directed and enacted by Cheran.

== Plot ==
The movie begins with Shankar (Sudeep), who runs an advertising agency, boarding a train to visit his native village to invite all of his friends to his wedding. The journey to his childhood days begins there. The happenings in the school, his tussle with his friends, and his first love with his classmate Kamala (Deepu) are all pictured realistically. Shankar reaches the village and invites all including Kamala, who promises to come to the wedding, with her husband and three children.

Then, he goes to Kerala where he had his college education. His major crush at that time was Lathika (Sridevika), a Malayali girl with whom he falls in love, but the affair proves to be short-lived as her parents marry her off to her cousin Madhavan. On reaching Kerala to invite her, Shankar is shattered to see his lover as a widow.

Meanwhile, he is dejected at the failure of his love affair, and he comes across a trusted friend, Divya (Meena), who instills confidence, unearths his hidden talents, and teaches him the lesson that one has to go ahead in life without looking back. However, she does not reveal the tragedy that occurred in her past. As time passes by, she reveals that her mother is a paralytic patient and that she now has to work for her survival. While she and Shankar travel on a bus, she reveals that she was in love with someone and believed that he was a good man but got cheated. A poetic narration on the need for a good friend has been stressed upon.

Towards the end, Shankar marries a girl of his parents' choice, Rashmi (Rashmi Kulkarni). All three girls who had played a part in his life and many college friends attend the wedding. Shankar sets a very nice ending to the main story.

== Cast ==
- Sudeep as Shankar
- Meena as Divya
- Sridevika as Lathika
- Deepu as Kamala
- Rashmi Kulkarni as Rashmi
- Srinivasa Murthy as Shankar's father
- Malathi Sri as Shankar's mother
- Yathiraj as Govinda
- Harish
- Laxmi Narayan
- Vishwanath

== Production ==
Part of the film was shot in Kerala, as Sridevika plays the role of a Keralite girl. The filming was completed within ten months.

== Soundtrack ==
The soundtrack was composed by Bharadwaj who composed the original version, whereas Rajesh Ramanath composed the background score. All the tunes from original were retained. The national-award-winning track "Ovvuru Pookalume" in the Tamil version was reused in this film as "Aralova Hoovugale", and singer K. S. Chithra won Filmfare Award South.

My Autograph

Soundtrack album by Bharadwaj
- Released: 12 January 2006
- Genre: Film soundtrack
- Producer: Bharadwaj

Bharadwaj chronology
Idhaya Thirudan (2006)	My Autograph (2006)	Thirupathi (2006)
External audio
- Official Audio Jukebox on YouTube

Sl No.	Song title	Singer(s)	Lyrics
1	"Nannavalu"	Rajesh Krishnan	K. Kalyan
2	"Araluva Hoovugale"	K. S. Chitra	K. Kalyan
3	"Malle Hudugi"	Rajesh Krishnan, Rashmi	K. Kalyan
4	"Jagadodharana"	Rashmi, Srividya	Purandara Dasa
5	"Kila Kila"	Chetan Sosca	K. Kalyan
6	"Savi Savi Nenapu"	Hariharan	K. Kalyan

== Reception ==
A critic from Sify said that "Sudeep besides direction has acted very well. His ability from the beginning of career to emote in touching sequences has given him confidence to accept this film that is close to his heart". A critic from Rediff.com wrote that "My Autograph is a pleasant film a rarity after the mediocre fare released recently". A critic from Chitraloka.com wrote that "Don't miss this film. It touches your heart and mind at a time". Deccan Herald wrote "Though the first half is realistically portrayed, more incidents at the end seem to make one feel that the movie is a bit of a drag. [..] Good camerawork and dialogues are other plus points apart from the performances of Sudeep, Srinivasamurthy and Meena. The only flaw, perhaps, is the lengthy narration. But somewhere Sudeep, like Cheran in his Autograph, is able to convince you that he is not alone and many among those who see the movie would have undergone similar experiences".

== Box office ==
This film got good response from critics, it completed 175 days.

== Awards ==
- 53rd Filmfare Awards South
  - Best Actor – Kannada → Sudeep –– Nominated
  - Best Actress – Kannada → Meena –– Nominated
- 54th Filmfare Awards South
  - Best Female Playback Singer – Kannada → K. S. Chitra – for the song, "Araluva Hoovugale" –– Won

== In popular culture ==
Sudeep reprised his role in a cameo for the film Care of Footpath (2006).
