= Sudeepa =

Indian actor and director (born 1971)

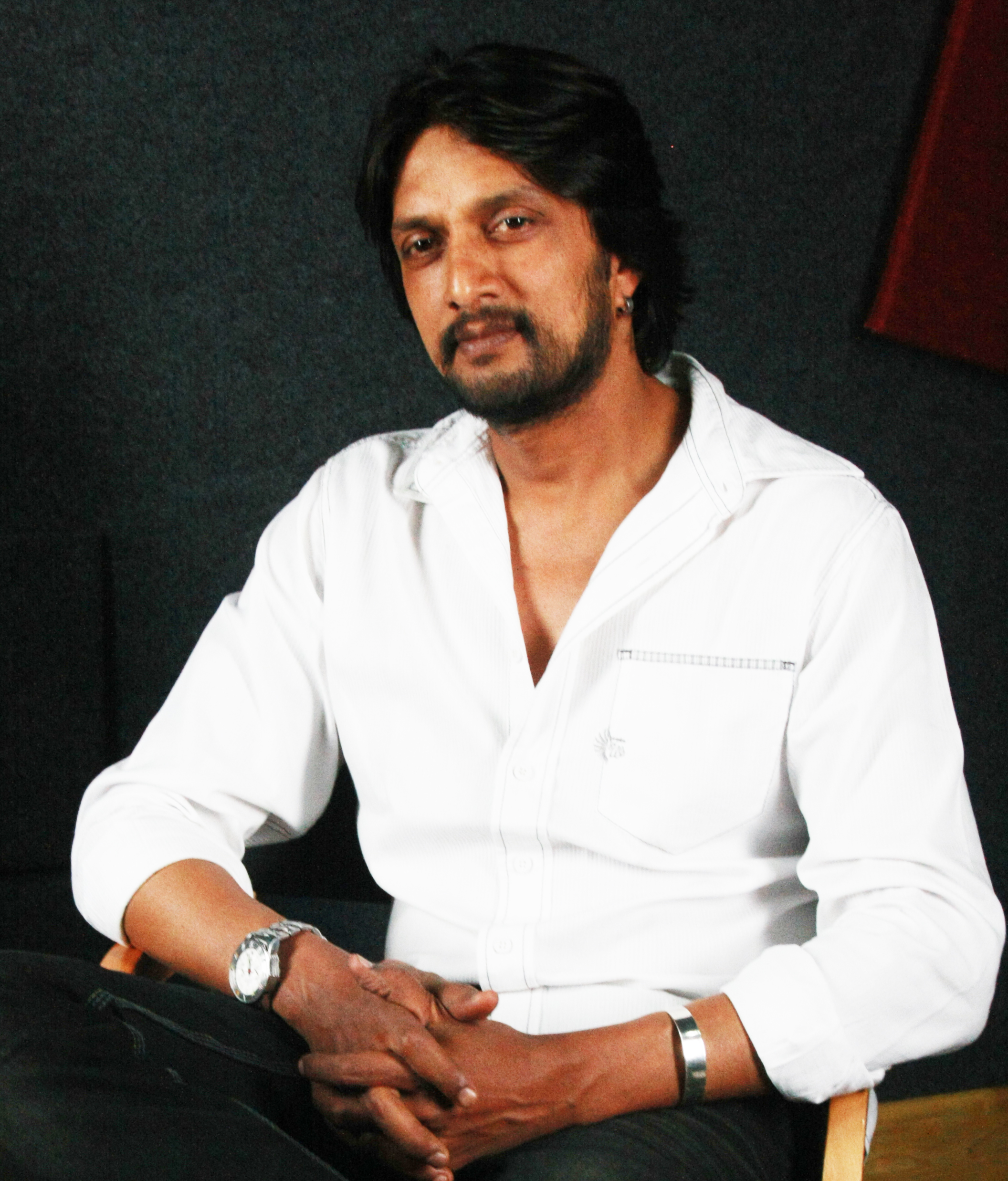
- Sudeepa in 2013
- Born: Sudeep Sanjeev; 2 September 1971 (age 55); Shimoga, Mysore State (now Karnataka), India
- Other names: Deepu, Abhinaya Chakravarthy
- Education: Dayananda Sagar College of Engineering (BE)
- Occupations: Actor; director; producer; television presenter; singer
- Years active: 1997–present
- Works: Full list
- Spouse: Priya Radhakrishna (m. 2001)
- Children: 1
- Honors: Full list

Sudeep Sanjeev (born 2 September 1971), also known as Sudeepa, is an Indian actor, director, producer, screenwriter, singer and television presenter, who primarily works in Kannada cinema. He has also worked in Hindi, Telugu and Tamil films. He is one of the highest paid actors of Kannada films and also featured in Forbes India's Celebrity 100 list since 2013. He has received several awards including four Filmfare awards, two Karnataka State Film Awards and one Nandi Award.

Sudeepa began his acting career with a supporting role in Thayavva (1997) and Prathyartha (1999), followed by his breakthrough with a leading role in Sunil Kumar Desai's romance Sparsha (2000). He established himself in the critically acclaimed Huchcha (2001), and further starred in several commercially successful films including Nandhi (2002), Kiccha (2003), Swathi Muthu (2003), My Autograph (2006), No 73, Shanthi Nivasa (2007), Mussanjemaatu (2008), Veera Madakari (2009), Just Maath Maathalli (2010), Vishnuvardhana (2011), Kempe Gowda (2011), Maanikya (2014), Ranna (2015), Kotigobba 2 (2016), Hebbuli (2017), The Villain (2018), Pailwaan (2019), Telugu-Hindi bilingual Rakta Charitra, the Telugu-Tamil bilingual Eega (2012) and the Hindi films Phoonk (2008) and Dabangg 3 (2019).

He won the Filmfare Award for Best Actor – Kannada for three consecutive years for his films Huchcha, Nandhi and Swathi Muthu. Since 2013, he has been hosting the television reality show Bigg Boss Kannada. His performance in the 2001 film, Huchcha, earned him the nickname Kichcha Sudeepa by his fans.

== Early life ==
Sudeepa was born on 2 September 1971 to Sanjeev Manjappa and Saroja in Shimoga in Shimoga district of present-day Karnataka as Sudeep. The family had migrated to Shimoga from Narasimharajapura, Chikmagalur district. He obtained a bachelor's degree in Industrial and production engineering from Dayananda Sagar College of Engineering, Bangalore. He represented the college in under-17 cricket. He attended the Roshan Taneja School of Acting in Mumbai, where he overcame his 'shyness'.

== Career ==
=== Films ===
==== 1997–2001: Early roles and breakthrough ====
Sudeep began his acting career with supporting roles in V. Umakanth's Thayavva (1997) and Sunil Kumar Desai's suspense thriller, Prathyartha (1999). He subsequently appeared in a leading role in Desai's Sparsha (2000), which marked his initial recognition as a lead actor.

In 2001, he achieved wider prominence with Huchcha where his portrayal of a troubled youth established him as a leading actor in Kannada cinema and earned him the nickname “Kiccha”. The film, a remake of Tamil film Sethu, was directed by Om Prakash Rao and co-starred Rekha Vedavyas. His performance won him his first Filmfare Best Actor award. This was quickly followed by S. Mahendar's Vaalee (2001), where he played dual roles and further expanded his on‑screen presence.

==== 2002–2006: Commercial success and critical recognition ====
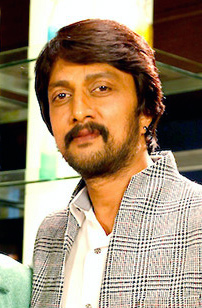
Sudeep on the sets of Luv U Alia

Between 2002 and 2003, Sudeep featured in a series of commercially successful films including Dhumm (2002), Nandhi (2002) and Kiccha (2003). In 2003, for his performance in Swathi Muthu, the Kannada adaption of K. Viswanath's Telugu film Swathi Muthyam (1986), earned him his third Filmfare Best Actor award and further consolidated his position in the industry. He appeared in Yogaraj Bhat's Ranga (S.S.L.C) (2004) playing a hot-headed auto rickshaw driver trying to turn his life around by clearing his SSLC examinations. The film received generally positive reviews and emerged as a commercial success. This was followed by average grossers, Nalla (2004) and Maharaja (2005). He reunited with Om Prakash Rao for the film Kashi from Village (2005).

The year 2006 marked Sudeep's entry into film direction. He directed and starred in My Autograph, an official remake of Cheran's Tamil film Autograph (2004). The film got good response from critics and completed 175 days theatrical run in Karnataka. Other mass entertainer releases during this period included Thirupathi and Hubli (both in 2006)

==== 2007–2011: Expansion, direction, and multilingual ventures ====
Sudeep ventured into production in his second directorial film, No 73, Shanthi Nivasa (2007) besides playing the lead. A critic from Rediff.com wrote that "In these days of fast music, stereotyped dialogues and gory action sequences, a film like 73, Shanthi Nivasa is welcome". and Mussanjemaatu (2008), while also making his Hindi film debut with Ram Gopal Varma’s supernatural thriller, Phoonk (2008). His other notable performances in the year include romantic dramas Mussanjemaatu, Kaamannana Makkalu and action oriented Gooli.

In 2009, he directed and played dual roles in Veera Madakari, a remake of S. S. Rajamouli's Telugu film, Vikramarkudu (2006). In 2010, Sudeep appeared in nine films including the self-directed romantic musical Just Maath Maathalli (2010) and Chi. Guru Dutt's Kiccha Huccha, both co-starring Ramya. During this period, he also appeared in Hindi and bilingual productions including Rann (2010), Phoonk 2 and Rakta Charitra. Starting from Veera Parampare (2010), he changed his screen name from Sudeep to Sudeepa per S. Narayan's advice and after the film's success he decided to keep the name.

In 2011, he had notable commercial success with Kempe Gowda and Vishnuvardhana.

==== 2012–2016: Pan‑Indian recognition ====
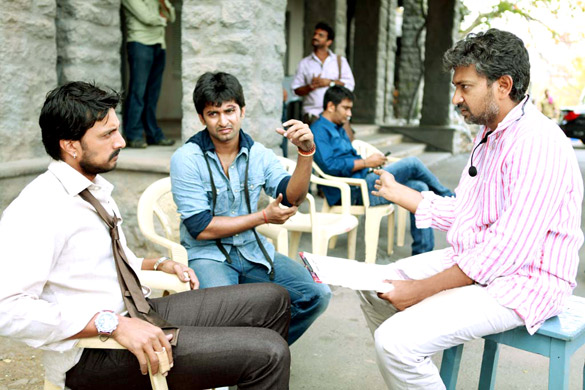
Sudeep, Nani and S. S. Rajamouli on the sets of Eega

Sudeep gained wider national recognition with S. S. Rajamouli’s bilingual fantasy film Eega (2012), in which he portrayed an industrialist who, on falling for an NGO worker (played by Samantha Ruth Prabhu), kills her alleged lover, who begins to haunt him in the form of a housefly. The film and Sudeepa's performance were highly acclaimed.

He continued with films such as Bachchan and Varadanayaka and his directorial venture Maanikya (2014). In 2015, he appeared in Ranna, a remake of the Telugu film, Attarintiki Daredi, which again was a blockbuster and made appearances in multilingual projects including Baahubali: The Beginning where he played a cameo role as a Persian arms trader. Directed by Rajamouli, the film emerged as the year's highest-grossing film. His first straight Tamil project Puli released in 2015 and co-starred Vijay and Sridevi.

His subsequent releases included the Kannada-Tamil bilingual Kotigobba 2/Mudinja Ivana Pudi (2016) and Mukunda Murari (2016), reflecting his continued presence in commercial cinema.

==== 2017–2021: Continued commercial success and wider reach ====
Sudeep starred in Hebbuli (2017) and The Villain (2018), both of which were commercially successful. In 2019, he appeared in multiple high‑profile projects including Pailwaan, the Telugu historical drama Sye Raa Narasimha Reddy with Chiranjeevi, and the Hindi film Dabangg 3 where he played the archenemy of Salman Khan's Chulbul Pandey character.

He later reprised his role in Kotigobba 3 (2021), continuing his association with franchise films. As on 2021, Sudeep completed his 26 years in film industry.

==== 2022–present: Recent work ====
In 2022, Sudeep starred in the action‑adventure film Vikrant Rona, which marked one of his major recent releases directed by Anup Bhandari, featured Nirup Bhandari and Neetha Ashok. He continued to appear in action thriller films such as Kabzaa (2023), Max (2024) and its sequel Mark (2025) which proved commercially successful.

==== As singer ====
Besides acting, Sudeep frequently sings in his screen roles, including Vaalee (2001), Chandu (2002), Ranga SSLC (2004), Nalla (2004), #73, Shaanthi Nivaasa (2007), Veera madakari (2009), Kempe Gowda (2011), Bachchan (2013) and also for others movies such as Mandya to Mumbai (2014), Ring Road Shubha (2014) and Raate (2015).

=== As producer ===
Sudeep owns a film production company named Kiccha Creations, which is credited with My Autograph (2006), No 73, Shantinivasa (2007), Jigarthanda (2016), Maanikya (2013), Ambi Ning Vayassaytho (2019).

=== Television ===
Sudeepa made his TV debut in the serial Premada Kadambari, named after a line in the song Bandhana on Udaya TV. He was roped in to play the main host of the reality show Pyate Hudgeer-Halli Lifu, aired on Suvarna, which was an immediate success. Endemol Shine Group's flagship show Big Brother was adapted to Kannada as Bigg Boss Kannada and Sudeepa was the chosen to play the host for the first season which was aired on ETV Kannada. He continued to host the second season on Asianet Suvarna. Colors Kannada (formerly ETV Kannada) regained the rights to the show in 2015 with Sudeepa signing a five-season deal to host the show which was estimated to be around ₹20 crore (equivalent to ₹33 crore or US$3.4 million in 2026) which was a landmark deal in Kannada television industry.

== Personal life ==
Sudeepa is the captain of Karnataka Bulldozers cricket team that competes in the Celebrity Cricket League.

Sudeepa met Priya Radhakrishna, Malayali, in Bangalore, in 2000 and they married in 2001. Priya worked in an airline company and then in a bank, prior to their marriage. Their only child, Saanvi, was born in 2004. In 2013, Sudeepa launched Stage 360°, an events management company, that his wife took an active part In. The couple split in September 2015, later they reconciled.

== In the media ==
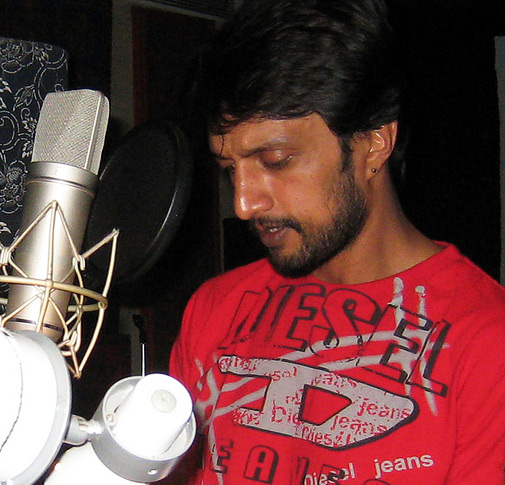
Sudeepa recording for TeachAids

Sudeepa has been described by the critics as one of the most talented actors in Kannada cinema. He was listed first in the Times 25 Most Desirable Men in Bangalore in 2012. In 2012, he was given a title, "Abhinaya Chakravarthy", by a Kannada organisation, Karnataka Rakshana Vedike.

In 2012, Sudeepa was signed as the Brand Ambassador of Joyalukkas, a Jewellery Retail Chain. In 2013, he was appointed as the Brand Ambassador for Bangalore Traffic Police Department and Income Tax Department. In 2014, he was appointed as the Brand Ambassador for Intex Technologies (India) Mobiles & Paragon Footwear.

In 2013, on World AIDS Day, Sudeepa teamed up with Vijay Raghavendra and other actors to record voiceovers for the TeachAids interactive software, developed at Stanford University.

In 2015, Sudeepa appeared in advertisements in the Kannada language for OLX.in, along with the veteran Kannada actor, Anant Nag. He had previously appeared in ads with Sadhu Kokila for the same company.

In 2021, Sudeepa along with other celebrities and billionaires participated in the "Checkmate Covid" charity event for the COVID-19 pandemic where they played in a chess simultaneous exhibition hosted by former World Chess Champion Viswanathan Anand. In 2022, he was appointed brand ambassador of Karnataka Animal Husbandry Department's cow adoption programme. On 13 June 2021, Sudeep along with Sajid Nadiadwala and Nikhil Kamath, Chief Information Officer and co-founder of Zerodha, cheated during the online charity event against five-time world chess champion Vishwanathan Anand. Chess.com suspended their accounts for violating fair play.

=== Humanitarian work ===
Sudeepa is involved in humanitarian works through his organisation Kiccha Sudeepa Charitable Society. The trust helps underprivileged school children, providing them with uniforms as well as scholarships. The society helped senior Kannada film artists, technicians and others by providing them with necessary help during the COVID-19 pandemic who were unable to get work.

== Political affiliations ==
On 6 April 2023, at a press conference held in Ashok Hotel, Bangalore, Sudeepa openly declared his support for the then incumbent Chief Minister Basavaraj Bommai and the BJP in the 2023 Karnataka assembly elections. He stated that he would be campaigning for BJP in all the constituencies that he is told by the Chief Minister.

== Discography ==
=== As playback singer ===
Year (Note: Refers to the year in which the album was released.)	Song	Film	Composer	Co-singer(s)	Notes	Ref.
2002	"Sonta ada"	Chandu	Gurukiran			
2003	"Pataisu"	Black and White	Rajesh Ramanath			
2004	"Dove Dove Duniya"	Ranga SSLC	Sandeep Chowta			
2004	"Bhoomi Yake"	Ranga SSLC	Sandeep Chowta	Raju Ananthaswamy; Shamitha Malnad		
2004	"Macha Dove Hodiyod"	Nalla	Venkat Narayan			
2007	"Ondu Olle Kathe"	No 73, Shanthi Nivasa	Bharadwaj	Shiva Rajkumar		
2009	"Jinta Tha"	Veera Madakari	M. M. Keeravani			
2011	"Hale Radio"	Kempe Gowda	Arjun Janya	Shamitha Malnad	Nominated—Times Film Awards Best Singer Male – Kannada	
2013	"Onchuru"	Bachchan	V. Harikrishna	Indu Nagaraj		
2014	"Kanasige Koneyilla"	Ring Road	Vani Harikrishna			
2014	"Jodi Hakki"	Rhaatee	V. Harikrishna			
2015	"Damaru Bole"	Mandya to Mumbai	Charan Raj	Charan Raj		
2015	"Deola Deola"	Mandya to Mumbai	Charan Raj	Sangeetha Katti		
2016	"Tiger Tiger"	Tiger	Arjun Janya			
2016	"Huna Huna"	Kotigobba 2	D Imman	Shashaa Tirupathi, Mc Rude		
2017	Hatharike Bappa Re	Uppu Huli Khara	Juda Sandy			
2017	"Ivale Nanna Hudugi"	Naa Panta Kano	S. Narayan			
2025	"Varum Vetri"	—N/a	Amresh Ganesh		Tamil indie song	
