= Swathi Muthu =

2003 Indian Kannada-language film by D. Rajendra Babu

- Promotional poster
- Directed by: D. Rajendra Babu
- Written by: V. Nagendra Prasad (dialogues)
- Screenplay by: K. Viswanath
- Based on: Swati Mutyam by K. Viswanath
- Produced by: Sarovar Sanjeev
- Starring: Sudeep; Meena; Kishan Shrikanth
- Cinematography: H. M. Ramachandra
- Edited by: Shyam Yadav
- Music by: Rajesh Ramanath
- Production company: Sarovar Productions
- Release date: 26 December 2003
- Running time: 159 minutes
- Country: India
- Language: Kannada

Swathi Muthu (transl. White Pearl) is a 2003 Indian Kannada-language drama film directed by D. Rajendra Babu and written by K. Vishwanath. This film stars Sudeep and Meena. It is an official remake of Telugu film Swati Mutyam (1986). Doddanna, Pavitra Lokesh and Leelavathi feature in supporting roles.

== Plot ==
Shivaiah, an autistic man, lives in a village with his grandmother. All he is good at is obeying his trusted grandmother. In an attempt to do good to Lalitha, a destitute young widow with a five-year-old son, Shivaiah marries her during an auspicious village festival.

The villagers are shocked and try to harm him as his act goes against traditional societal norms. In the meantime, Shivaiah's grandmother dies. Lalitha wants to save her new husband's life and so moves with him and her son to a city in search of better prospects. With support from a few of their acquaintances, the family of three settle down.

Life for them, thereafter, looks good and promising. Lalitha begins to appreciate Shivaiah's innocence and warmth. She grows closer to him and eventually bears him a son. Years pass, the children grow up, and then Lalitha breathes her last. Shivaiah lives with her memories for a long time. At the end, he is seen leaving his old house in the company of his children and grandchildren, carrying with him a tulsi plant which symbolizes his memories of Lalitha.

== Cast ==
- Sudeep as Shivaiah
- Meena as Lalitha
- Kishan Shrikanth as Krishnamurthy
- Leelavathi
- Bharath Bhagavathar
- Sanketh Kashi
- Pavithra Lokesh
- B. V. Radha
- Pruthviraj
- M. S. Umesh
- Doddanna
- Bank Janardhan
- Sadashiva Brahmavar
- Ramakrishna
- Lokanath
- Mandeep Roy
- Pramila Joshai
- Sarigama Viji
- Saroja Srishaila

== Soundtrack ==
Swathi Muthu

Soundtrack album by Rajesh Ramanath
- Released: 2003
- Genre: Feature film soundtrack
- Language: Kannada
- Label: Ashwini audio
- Producer: Rajesh Ramnath
External audio
- Official Audio Jukebox on YouTube

The soundtrack was composed by Rajesh Ramanath which has been reused from the original songs composed by Ilaiyaraaja.

Sl No.	Song title	Singer(s)	Lyrics
1	"Sri Chakradharige"	K. S. Chitra	V. Nagendra Prasad
2	"Maangalya"	K. S. Chitra	V. Nagendra Prasad
3	"Andada Chandada"	Rajesh Krishnan, Nanditha	V. Nagendra Prasad
4	"Malagiruva"	K. J. Yesudas, K. S. Chitra	V. Nagendra Prasad
5	"Amma Dharma"	S. P. Balasubrahmanyam, K. S. Chitra	V. Nagendra Prasad
6	"Laali"	Rajesh Krishnan, K. S. Chitra	V. Nagendra Prasad
7	"Manasu Bareda"	Rajesh Krishnan, K. S. Chitra	V. Nagendra Prasad
8	"Suvvi Suvvi"	Rajesh Krishnan, K. S. Chitra	V. Nagendra Prasad

== Reception ==
A critic from Deccan Herald wrote that "Remake of the Telugu hit ‘Swati Muthyam’; ‘Swati Muthu’ manages to retain the same charm and lovable simplicity of the original". A critic from Chitraloka.com called the film "a must see film".

== Awards ==
- Filmfare Awards South - Best Actor - Kannada for Sudeep & Best Actress - Kannada for Meena
- Film Fan's Association Awards - Best Actor - Kannada - Sudeep
- Hello Gandhinagara Awards - Special Award - Sudeep
