= Allari Naresh =

Indian actor (born 1986)

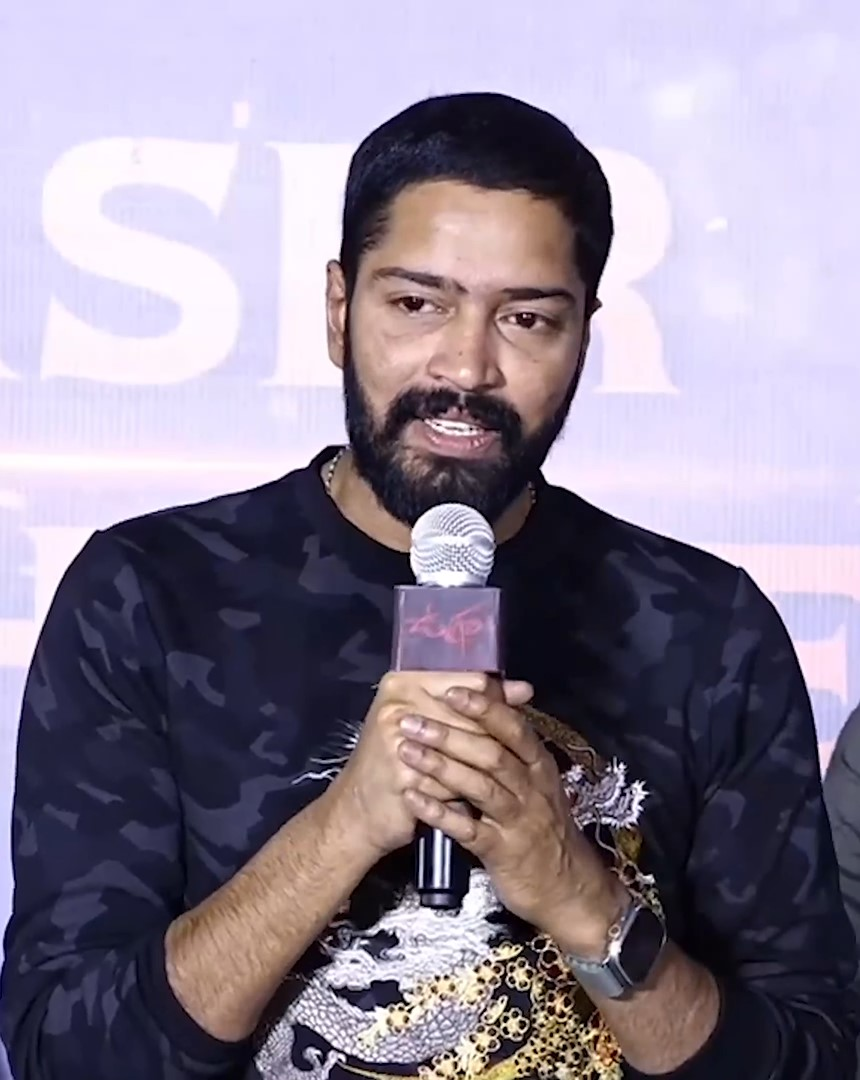
- Allari Naresh in February 2023
- Born: Edara Naresh; 30 June 1982 (age 44); Madras, Tamil Nadu, India (present-day Chennai)
- Occupations: Actor; Film producer
- Years active: 2002–present
- Organization: E. V .V. Cinema
- Spouse: Virupa Kantamneni (m. 2015)
- Children: 1
- Father: E. V. V. Satyanarayana
- Relatives: Aryan Rajesh (Elder Brother)

Edara Naresh (born 30 June 1982), better known as Allari Naresh, is an Indian actor and film producer who works predominantly in Telugu films. Starring in over 55 films and known for his various comic roles, Naresh earned two Filmfare Awards South, one Nandi Award, and one South Indian International Movie Award for his work.

Naresh established himself as a lead actor with commercial successes such as Allari (2001), Thotti Gang (2002), Maa Alludu Very Good (2003), Kithakithalu (2006), Gamyam (2008), Dongala Bandi (2008), Blade Babji (2008), Bendu Apparao R.M.P (2009), Sambho Siva Sambho (2010), Aha Naa Pellanta (2011), Seema Tapakai (2011), Sudigadu (2012), Yamudiki Mogudu (2012), Kevvu Keka (2013), Maharshi (2019), and Naandhi (2021). He is also a producer and has produced films with his brother Aryan Rajesh under their production company, E. V .V. Cinema.

== Personal life ==
Naresh is the younger son of veteran Telugu director and producer E. V. V. Satyanarayana. He was born in present-day Chennai on 30 June 1986, while their family hails from Korumamidi village in West Godavari district of Andhra Pradesh. After completing his schooling at Chettinad Vidyashram, Chennai, Naresh moved to Hyderabad. He is fluent in Telugu, Tamil, Hindi and English. He got the moniker "Allari" after the success of his first film.

In 2010, he was reported to be a romantic relationship with his costar Gajala. Naresh married Chennai-based architect Virupa Kantamaneni in 2015. The couple has a daughter, born in 2016.

== Film career ==
=== 2002–2007 : Debut and breakthrough ===
Naresh made his foray into films under the direction of Ravi Babu in the film Allari, an adult comedy in which he played the role of an 18-year-old who is infatuated with a beautiful girl. His performance was well praised by the critics. idlebrain.com wrote, "Naresh is a natural actor and he suited the role perfectly. His dialogue delivery is perfect and has very good timing in doing comedy. He has a bright future ahead, if he chooses his future projects carefully." The film did exceptionally well at the box office, giving him recognition as "Allari Naresh". However, his next film Dhanalakshmi, I Love You, a remake of Ramji Rao Speaking, received negative reviews, and faltered at the box office. His third release Thotti Gang, co-starring Prabhu Deva and Sunil, was successful at the box office, which was followed by two flops Juniors, the remake of Thulluvadho Ilamai and Praanam, which featured him in a dual role.

Naresh got his resurgence in the form of Maa Alludu Very Good, co-starring Rajendra Prasad, which was a massive hit at the box office. He debuted in Tamil with Kurumbu, a remake of Allari, which failed at the box office. His next was Nenu co-starring Veda and Abhishek, which is a remake of Kaadhal Kondein. Though the film was a failure at the box office, he received wide critical acclaim for his portrayal of Vinod, a psychotic who falls in love with his friend, only to know that she's in love with his close friend, thus marking it as one of his finest performances to date. IndiaGlitz wrote, "Naresh is more than adequate in a role that is a challenge to even seasoned artistes. He has to kindle detest as well as sympathy. It is a tightrope walk, and he passes muster. The only way for Naresh after this film is up."

Naresh's lean phase continued with flops like Nuvvante Naakishtam, Danger and Party, succeeded by Kithakithalu, a blockbuster at the box office, with critics appreciating Naresh's performance. Roommates and Gopi – Goda Meedha Pilli failed at the box office. His next successful film, Athili Sattibabu LKG, boosted his career, making him a common name in the Telugu film industry. Later on, after two back-to-back flops in the form of Allare Allari and Pellaindi Kaani, Naresh got his next success in the form of Seema Sastri, thus ending 2007 on a happy note.

=== 2008–2011: Commercial successes ===
Naresh had eight releases in 2008, a rare feat in those days. His first three releases Sundara Kanda, Vishaka Express, in which he played a negative role, and Pelli Kaani Prasad bombed at the box office, with Naresh's performance in the film Vishaka Express getting huge applause from critics. His next film Gamyam, co-starring Sharwanand, was a critical as well as commercial success. Naresh played the role of Gali Seenu, a motorcycle thief who brings a change in the hero's attitude by his actions. His performance was well praised by the critics. Rediff wrote, "Allari Naresh has finally found his groove. He excels as Srinu, a role that somewhat resembles what Jagapathi Babu played in Anthahpuram. The timing of his one-liners is absolutely perfect and natural. One has to see the film to believe it." He received Nandi Award for Best Supporting Actor and Filmfare Best Supporting Actor Award for his performance, which remains to be one of his best performances in his career. While Bommana Brothers Chandana Sisters and Blade Babji were hits at the box office, Siddu From Sikakulam was an average and Dongala Bandi was an average grosser because of the weak story but the cast was praised for their respective performance at the box office. 2009 had two releases of Naresh, which were Fitting Master and Bendu Apparao R.M.P. Fitting Master was an average grosser, while Bendu Apparao R.M.P. was a hit at the box office, which was only successful film because of the performances of Meghana Raj and Allari Naresh, which stood resisting the super-success Magadheera.

He had seven releases in 2010, again a rare feat. He first starred in Shambo Shiva Shambo, a remake of Tamil Film Nadodigal, co-starring Ravi Teja and Siva Balaji. The film received positive reviews mainly because of the performance. While Rambabu Gadi Pellam, Aakasa Ramanna, and Subhapradam were flops at the box office, Betting Bangaraju, Saradaga Kasepu and Kathi Kantha Rao were super hits at the box office. 2011 saw Naresh acting in five films, one of which was a cameo appearance. His first release of the year was Aha Naa Pellanta, co-starring Ritu Barmecha, Srihari, Subbaraju. He played the role of Subrahmanyam aka Subbu, a software engineer whose life takes a drastic turn when he and a girl of faction background misunderstand that they made love with each other. His performance was well praised by the critics. The film was a huge success, which was the only hit for Telugu cinema along with Ravi Teja's Mirapakay and Nani's Ala Modalaindi. His next release, Seema Tapakai, was also a success at the box office. He appeared in a cameo appearance in the film Chandamama Katha, while his next film Madatha Kaja was an average at the box office.

=== 2012–present ===
In 2012, Naresh starred in three films. The first was Nuvva Nena co-starring Shriya Saran and Sharwanand, which is based on Deewana Mastana. His next film was Sudigadu, a film composed of various spoofs on nearly 100 Telugu films, directed by Bhimaneni Srinivasa Rao. The film did exceptionally well at the box office, cementing his position in Telugu cinema. His last release of the year was Yamudiki Mogudu, in which he plays the role of a stage artist whose fate is not designed by the creator and his life after he falls in love with the daughter of the lord of death. The film was also a success at the box office. In 2013, He played the lead in Action 3D, the first Indian 3D comedy film in Telugu. Besides, he also starred in Kevvu Keka (2013) co-starring Sharmila Mandre.

In 2014, Naresh played an obese man in the film Laddu Babu by Ravi Babu making his third collaboration with him after Allari and Party with Shashank as the co-actor. Later, he played a dual role in Jump Jilani (2014), a remake of Tamil film Kalakalappu. Naresh teamed up with filmmaker Mohana Krishna Indraganti for the film Bandipotu, produced by his elder brother Aryan Rajesh under E. V .V. Cinema banner. The film is titled and based on N. T. Rama Rao's 1968 film of the same name. The film released received mixed reviews from Idlebrain Jeevi and greatandhra pointing at the slow narration, however, praised Naresh's performance. In 2015, he appeared in the action comedy James Bond, alongside Sakshi Chaudhary Later the year, he co-starred with veteran Telugu actor Mohan Babu for the film Mama Manchu Alludu Kanchu which was directed by Srinivas Reddy. The film also starred Meena and Ramya Krishnan and this was Naresh's landmark 50th movie. He also appeared in a Tamil film Poraali (2015) directed by Samuthirakani. In 2016, he appeared in two films, Selfie Raja and Intlo Deyyam Nakem Bhayam, the latter gained garnered poor reviews but was praised for its comedy. In 2017, he starred in the film Meda Meeda Abbayi, which was a remake of Oru Vadakkan Selfie. In 2018, Silly Fellows co-starring Allari Naresh and Sunil was released. In 2019, Naresh co-starred alongside Mahesh Babu for Vamshi Paidipally-directed Maharshi. The film grossed over ₹175 crore worldwide.

In 2021, Naresh starred in two films, Bangaru Bullodu and Naandhi. While Bangaru Bullodu received an average response, Naandhi was a critical and commercial success. In 2023, the upcoming film starring Allari Naresh is titled Bachchala Malli. In 2024, Naresh starred in a new film titled Aa Okkati Adakku, alongside Faria Abdullah and directed by Malli Ankam, which released on 3 May 2024.

== Filmography ==
Key
| † | Denotes films that have not yet been released |

- All films are in Telugu, unless otherwise noted

List of films and roles
| Year | Title | Role(s) | Notes | Ref |
|---|---|---|---|---|
| 2002 | Allari | Ravi | | |
| 2002 | Dhanalakshmi, I Love You | Raju | | |
| 2002 | Thotti Gang | Achi Babu | | |
| 2003 | Juniors | Mahesh | | |
| 2003 | Praanam | Sivudu / Kaasi | Dual role | |
| 2003 | Maa Alludu Very Good | 'Purse' Ram aka Parasuram | | |
| 2003 | Kurumbu | Ravi | Tamil film | |
| 2004 | Nenu | Vinod | | |
| 2004 | Bommalata | Babu | Cameo appearance | |
| 2005 | Nuvvante Naakishtam | Devudu | | |
| 2005 | Danger | Satya | | |
| 2006 | Party | Thotakura Kishore Babu "Nani" | | |
| 2006 | Kithakithalu | SI Relangi Raja Babu | | |
| 2006 | Roommates | Rama Krishna | | |
| 2006 | Gopi – Goda Meeda Pilli | Gopi | | |
| 2007 | Athili Sattibabu LKG | Athili Sattibabu | | |
| 2007 | Allare Allari | Veera Babu | | |
| 2007 | Pellaindi Kaani | Attchi Babu | | |
| 2007 | Seema Sastri | Seema Sastri | | |
| 2008 | Sundara Kanda | Naresh | | |
| 2008 | Vishaka Express | Ravi Varma | | |
| 2008 | Pelli Kaani Prasad | Vara Prasad | | |
| 2008 | Gamyam | Gali Seenu | Filmfare Award for Best Supporting Actor – Telugu | |
| 2008 | Bommana Brothers Chandana Sisters | Ramachandran | | |
| 2008 | Siddu from Sikakulam | Siddhu | | |
| 2008 | Blade Babji | Babji aka SI Krishna Manohar | 25th film | |
| 2008 | Dongala Bandi | Rama Krishna | | |
| 2009 | Fitting Master | Sampath | | |
| 2009 | Bendu Apparao R.M.P | R.M.P Bendu Apparao | | |
| 2010 | Shambo Shiva Shambo | Malli | | |
| 2010 | Rambabu Gadi Pellam | Rambabu | | |
| 2010 | Aakasa Ramanna | Rana | | |
| 2010 | Betting Bangaraju | Bangarraju | | |
| 2010 | Buridi | —N/a | Climax narrator | |
| 2010 | Subhapradam | Chakri | | |
| 2010 | Saradaga Kasepu | Ranga Babu | | |
| 2010 | Kathi Kantha Rao | P.C Kathi Kantha Rao | | |
| 2011 | Aha Naa Pellanta | Subbu | | |
| 2011 | Seema Tapakai | Krishna | | |
| 2011 | Chandamama Katha | Himself | Cameo appearance | |
| 2011 | Madatha Kaja | Kalyan | | |
| 2011 | Poraali | Nallavan | Tamil film | |
| 2012 | Nuvva Nena | Avinash | | |
| 2012 | Sudigadu | Kamesh / Shiva Manohar I.P.S. a.k.a. Shiva | Dual role | |
| 2012 | Yamudiki Mogudu | Naresh | | |
| 2013 | Action 3D | Bala Vardhan aka Bava | | |
| 2013 | Kevvu Keka | Bhuchi Raju | | |
| 2013 | Venkatadri Express | —N/a | As narrator | |
| 2014 | Laddu Babu | Laddu Babu | | |
| 2014 | Jump Jilani | Satti Babu / Ram Babu | Dual role | |
| 2014 | Brother of Bommali | Rama Krishna | | |
| 2015 | Bandipotu | Viswa | | |
| 2015 | Superstar Kidnap | Himself | Cameo appearance | |
| 2015 | James Bond | Nani / Lakshmi Prasad | | |
| 2015 | Mama Manchu Alludu Kanchu | Balaraju | 50th film | |
| 2016 | Selfie Raja | Selfie Raja / Bheems | Dual role | |
| 2016 | Intlo Deyyam Nakem Bhayam | Naresh | | |
| 2017 | Meda Meeda Abbayi | Srinu | | |
| 2018 | Silly Fellows | Veerababu | | |
| 2019 | Maharshi | Ravi Shankar | SIIMA Award Best Supporting Actor – Telugu | |
| 2021 | Bangaru Bullodu | Bhavani Prasad | | |
| 2021 | Naandhi | Surya Prakash | | |
| 2022 | Itlu Maredumilli Prajaneekam | Sripada Srinivas | | |
| 2023 | Ugram | CI K. Shiva Kumar | | |
| 2024 | Naa Saami Ranga | Anji | | |
| 2024 | Aa Okati Adakku | Gana | | |
| 2024 | Bachchala Malli | Malli | | |
| 2025 | 12A Railway Colony | Karthik | | |
| 2026 | Rambha Urvasi Menaka | Soori | | |
| TBA | Kanaka Durga † | TBA | Filming | |
| TBA | Alcohol † | TBA | Filming | |
| TBA | Sabhaku Namaskaram † | TBA | Filming | |

== Awards and nominations ==
List of awards and nominations
| Year | Title | Award | Category | Result | Ref. |
|---|---|---|---|---|---|
| 2008 | Gamyam | Filmfare Awards South | Best Supporting Actor – Telugu | Won | |
| 2008 | Gamyam | Nandi Awards | Best Supporting Actor | Won | |
| 2008 | Gamyam | Filmfare Awards South | Best Supporting Actor – Telugu | Won | |
| 2010 | Shambo Shiva Shambo | Filmfare Awards South | Best Supporting Actor – Telugu | Nominated | |
| 2019 | Maharshi | Zee Cine Awards Telugu | Best Supporting Actor | Won | |
| 2019 | Maharshi | South Indian International Movie Awards | Best Supporting Actor – Telugu | Won | |
| 2021 | Maharshi | Santosham Film Awards | Best Supporting Actor | Won | |
| 2021 | Naandhi | South Indian International Movie Awards | Best Actor – Telugu | Nominated | |
