= Yamudiki Mogudu (2012 film) =

- Film poster
- Directed by: E. Satti Babu
- Written by: Kranthi Reddy Sakinala
- Screenplay by: E. Satti Babu
- Story by: Jaya Siddu
- Produced by: Chanti Addala
- Starring: Allari Naresh; Richa Panai; Sayaji Shinde; Ramya Krishnan; Naresh
- Cinematography: Ravindra Babu
- Edited by: Gautham Raju
- Music by: Koti
- Production company: Friendly Movies
- Release date: 27 December 2012
- Running time: 157 minutes
- Country: India
- Language: Telugu

Yamudiki Mogudu (transl. Overlord to Yama) is a 2012 Indian Telugu-language fantasy comedy film directed by E. Satti Babu, produced by Chanti Addala under Friendly Movies banner and starring Allari Naresh and Richa Panai in lead roles. The film also features Ramya Krishnan and Naresh in pivotal roles. The soundtrack for the film was composed by music director Koti, and the cinematography was handled by Ravindra Babu. The film was theatrically released on 27 December 2012.

== Plot ==
Because of a mistake by Lord Brahma, Naresh is born a month early without the mandatory ‘Thalaratha’. Due to this, Naresh does not have the normal human attributes like death or disease, which are inherently unknown to him. He is also addicted to mythological dramas and takes part in them actively. During one such Swayamvaram drama, Lord Yama's daughter Yamaja is deliberately brought to the proceedings by Narada Maharshi. Yamaja marries Naresh in that play and takes him for her husband in real life too. She keeps hounding him and slowly, Naresh reciprocates her feelings. Lord Yama learns of this and sends his son Yamaganda and Chitra Gupta to bring her back.

As they fail in their mission, Lord Yama himself travels to Earth and takes her back. But Naresh catches the tail of the Bull of Yama and ended up in Trishanku's Heaven after accidentally letting go and with the blessings of a Disguised Narada, he reaches Yamalokam. There he befriends Aiyo, the wife of Yama and gains her support by telling his story. Later again through Narada, he learns that Yamaja has been captured in the Gada of Yama. He however manages to enter by disguising himself as a woman and reconciles with Yamaja. Even after being expelled by Yama from his Gada, Naresh continues to gain the support of Yamaja and Aiyo.

Frustrated, Yama tries to eliminate him but fails as Naresh had no 'Thalaratha', a script by Lord Brahma regarding Naresh's Birth, Life, and Death. This also comes to the knowledge of Naresh and he enters as Yama Jr. Meanwhile, Yama realises that though he can't kill Naresh, eventually his family will be killed as they possess 'Thalaratha'. Thus to save his family, Naresh begs Yama to take his life after 3 days as he may try to save his family. He leaves his powers and Yamaja and returns home sadly. In Yamalokam, he foresees his father's and brother's death. His Father dies in accident by hitting a Bus with his Scooter while his brother is killed by Royyala Naidu, a Don as his brother was responsible for his imprisonment.

First he lets his father travel by bus and follows it on his scooter, and saves his father as his father attempts suicide. He learns that his brother, a bank manager, owes ₹ 25 Lakhs to the bank after being falsely accused of taking money from it, the false evidences made by Royyala Naidu. Naresh participates in a stage play for which he is paid a remuneration of ₹ 25 Lakhs. He clears his brother's financial debt. But Royyala Naidu enters the scene and tries to stab Naresh's brother. Naresh remembers that the shirt worn by his brother is same as he saw in his premonition. After a fight he changes the shirt, wears it and gets stabbed. Before Yama can snatch his soul, Naresh stabs Royyala Naidu fatally and enters Yamalokam as a spirit now. After Aiyo's protest and upon Yamaja and Yamaganda's request, Yama restores Naresh's body and Naresh is married to Yamaja.

== Cast ==
- Allari Naresh as Naresh
- Richa Panai as Yamaja, Yama's daughter, Naresh's wife
- Sayaji Shinde as Yama
- Ramya Krishnan as Aiyo, Yama's wife
- Naresh as Narada
- Krishna Bhagavaan as Chitragupta
- Tanikella Bharani as Royyala Naidu
- Chandra Mohan as Chandram, Naresh's father
- Raghu Babu as Silk Dada
- Satya Krishnan as Naresh's sister-in-law
- Master Bharath as Yamaganda, Yama's son
- Rathna Shekar Reddy as Varuna Deva
- Chalapathi Rao as Brahma
- Shanoor Sana

== Production ==
In January 2012, E. Satti Babu who previously worked with Allari Naresh on Betting Bangaraju and Nenu had announced that they would collaborate again for a new film. It was reported that the film was titled as Nela Thakkuvodu and would begin production in early 2012. In February 2012, more details about the project were revealed about the project It was announced that the project would be a socio-fantasy film and eight huge sets were being built for the project. The director also announced that prominent music composer Koti had already started working on the project and would compose the entire soundtrack. It was also revealed that pre-production work was going on since three months and the filming will begin from 17 March 2012. It was also announced that the process of selecting the heroine has not been completed. The director also revealed that the title for the film had not been decided.

On 18 March, the film was officially launched and the muhurat of the film was held at Ramoji Film City in Hyderabad. It was announced that the film would be produced by Chanti Addala under Friendly Movies banner. In the muhurat event, it was announced that the film is set on Yamalokam backdrop and Sayaji Shinde will play the role of Yama while popular actress Ramya Krishna would be playing the role of Yama's wife. Producer Chanti Addala announced that the regular shooting will begin in April and the entire filming will be done in 4 schedules from April to July. He also revealed that there would be six songs in the film and that graphics would play a vital role in the film.

On 7 August, Times Of India newspaper reported that the film is likely to be titled as Yamudiki Mogudu after the 1988 film Yamudiki Mogudu starring Chiranjeevi. On 22 August, title of the film was officially announced as Yamudiki Mogudu. The announcement came on the occasion of popular actor Chiranjeevi's birthday, as the film title was inspired by his 1988 hit film. It was also announced that the popular song "Attho Atthamma Koothuro" from Chiranjeevi's Alluda Majaka was remixed in the film. The film is scheduled to release on 27 December 2012.

== Soundtrack ==
Yamudiki Mogudu

Soundtrack album by Koti
- Released: 25 November 2012
- Genre: Film soundtrack
- Length: 22:10
- Label: Aditya Music
- Producer: Koti

The soundtrack for the film was provided by Telugu music director Koti. The album was released through Aditya Music label on 25 November 2012 at an event held at Shilpakala Vedika in Hyderabad. Koti remixed one of his popular song "Attho Atthamma Koothuro" from the 1995 film Alluda Majaka in the film.

No.	Title	Lyrics	Artist(s)	Length
1.	"Orori Magadheera"	Ramajogayya Sastry	Sri Krishna, Anjana Sowmya	04:17
2.	"Pistolu Pilladanivo"	Ramajogayya Sastry	Hemachandra, Sravana Bhargavi	03:39
3.	"Narothama"	Ramajogayya Sastry	Vasundhara Das	03:31
4.	"Atto Attamma Koothuro"	Pothula Ravi Kiran	Rahul Sipligunj, Geetha Madhuri	03:56
5.	"Jhanak Jhanak"	Ramajogayya Sastry	Karthik	04:44
6.	"Gotitho Pekalinchu"	Ramajogayya Sastry	Rohit	01:09
7.	"Mamaho Yama"	Ramajogayya Sastry	Chandra Teja	00:54
Total length:				22:10

== Reception ==
Ch Sushil Rao of The Times of India rated the film two out of five stars and wrote, "Well, the story goes on. The dialogues which rhyme are impressive. Nothing else. Not even Allari Naresh. He might have the ease to pull off his role but the storyline which appears a bit clumsy leaves you scratching your head." A critic from NDTV wrote, "Director Satti Babu loses his grip in the second half. The screenplay in the second half is mediocre. Watch the film for the first half and go home. The entire second half is boring but for a few scenes."

Cheruku Raja of India Herald wrote, "Yamudiki Mogudu will appeal to the audience who love to see Allari Naresh movies without any conviction and concept." Y. Sunita Chowdhary of The Hindu wrote, "Naresh is not at his best but is okay, he enjoys his repartees. He clearly fails in bringing out melancholy in the finale. Krishna Bhagwan’s dialogues and some by Naresh are down right disgusting. A better second half could have made the film an average watch. This one is clearly made for the mass audience."

A critic from IANS wrote, "This film has a promising premise with the scope to weave sensible comedy. Sadly, what we get finally is an unsatisfying spoof on several films and film stars."
