= Saradaga Kasepu =

- Theatrical Release Poster
- Directed by: Vamsy
- Story by: Sankaramanchi
- Produced by: M. L. Padma Kumar Chowdary
- Starring: Allari Naresh; Nyra Banerjee; Srinivas Avasarala; Ahuti Prasad
- Cinematography: Loki P. Goud
- Edited by: Basva Paidireddy
- Music by: Chakri
- Distributed by: Sri Keerthi Creations
- Release date: 17 September 2010
- Country: India
- Language: Telugu

Saradaga Kasepu is a 2010 Indian Telugu-language comedy film directed by Vamsy starring Allari Naresh, Nyra Banerjee and Srinivas Avasarala in the lead roles. The film was released on 17 September 2010. It is a remake of the 1986 Malayalam movie Mazha Peyyunnu Maddalam Kottunnu directed by Priyadarshan.

== Plot ==
Ranga Babu (Allari Naresh) is a driver whose childhood friend is Srinivas (Srinivas Avasarala). Srinivas is from a rich family and lives in the U.S. Srinivas comes to India where his parents (Jeeva and Sana) want him to tie the knot with Raja Rao's (Ahuti Prasad) daughter Manimala (Madhurima) who lives in a different place. However, Srinivas has a condition that he must know about the girl's character before marriage. For this, he switches places with Ranga Babu. As expected, misunderstandings and confusions arise. What happens from there forms the rest of the story.

== Cast ==
- Allari Naresh as Ranga Babu
- Srinivas Avasarala as Srinivas
- Nyra Banerjee as Manimala
- Ahuti Prasad as Raja Rao
- Jeeva as Srinivas's dad
- Kondavalasa
- Duvvasi Mohan
- Krishna Bhagavan
- Narsing Yadav
- Jhansi
- Krishneswara Rao
- Sana
- Jaya Lalitha

== Soundtrack ==
The songs were composed by Chakri.

No.	Title	Singer(s)	Length
1.	"Malle Navvu Bulli Nuvve"	Hariharan, Kousalya
2.	"Vennela Chilakala"	Chakri
3.	"Oohala Sundara"	Vamshi, Anjana Soumya
4.	"Magadheera Sukumara"	Vamshi, Chaitra H. G.
5.	"Nee Palukulu"	Chakri, Malavika
