= Gopi – Goda Meeda Pilli =

- Movie Poster
- Directed by: Janardhana Maharshi
- Written by: Nivas; Veligonda Srinivas (dialogues)
- Screenplay by: N. Venkateswara Rao
- Story by: Janardhana Maharshi
- Produced by: Polisetti Rambabu; Palli Kesava Rao
- Starring: Allari Naresh; Gowri Munjal; Jagapathi Babu; Aarti Chabria
- Cinematography: V. Srinivasa Reddy
- Edited by: Kotagiri Venkateswara Rao
- Music by: Koti
- Production company: RS Films
- Release date: 16 November 2006
- Running time: 121 minutes
- Country: India
- Language: Telugu

Gopi – Goda Meeda Pilli (transl. Gopi – Cat on the wall) is a 2006 Indian Telugu-language comedy film directed by Janardhana Maharshi. It stars Allari Naresh, Jagapathi Babu, Gowri Munjal, Aarti Chabria in lead roles with music composed by Koti.

== Cast ==
- Allari Naresh as Gopi
- Jagapati Babu as Balavendra Chadda
- Gowri Munjal as Lakshmi
- Aarti Chabria as Priya / Monica Judi
- Vadde Naveen as Vamsi
- Suresh as Lord Vishnu
- Rambha as Lakshmi
- Vinod Kumar as Abbu Gulam
- Brahmanandam as Sampurnam
- Ali as Balaraju
- Sunil as Resort Manager Karunanidhi
- Venu Madhav as Krishunudu
- Tanikella Bharani as Gopi's father
- Mallikarjuna Rao as Malli
- Sai Kiran as Kiran: Lakshmi's brother-in-law
- Pradeep as Sudeep: Lakshmi's elder brother
- Sri Harsha as Harsha: Lakshmi's younger brother
- Melkote as Boss
- Lakshmipati
- Gundu Hanumantha Rao as Marriage Bureau Owner
- Gundu Sudarshan
- Hema as Gopi's mother
- Geetha Singh as Monalisa
- Kranthi as Lakshmi's sister-in-law

== Production ==
The muhurat of the film took place on 27 June 2006 at Prasad Labs, Hyderabad. The title was announced in mid-2006. The pilli (transl. cat) refers to Allari Naresh's character while Jagapathi Babu plays his master. The film was shot at Sarathi Studios on 16 October 2006.

== Soundtrack ==
Gopi (Goda Meeda Pilli)

Film score by Koti
- Released: 2006
- Genre: Soundtrack
- Length: 19:41
- Label: Supreme Music
- Producer: Koti

Koti chronology
Note Book (2006)	Gopi (Goda Meeda Pilli) (2006)	Classmates (2006)

Music composed by Koti. The music was released on Supreme Music Company. The audio release function was held on 22 October 2006 in Miryalaguda with K. Raghavendra Rao, E. V. V. Satyanarayana, Srikanth, Venu Thottempudi, Sivaji, Sai Kiran, P. Sai Kumar and Sharwanand in attendance.

No.	Title	Lyrics	Singer(s)	Length
1.	"Suppose Kaveri"	Gangotri Viswanath	Nihal	3:41
2.	"Nachave Tega Nachave"	Gangotri Viswanath	Sai	3:40
3.	"Mudduke Mudduche"	Gangotri Viswanath	Sri Krishna	3:58
4.	"Ammammo Ila Chudu"	Ananta Sriram	Sai	4:06
5.	"I Love U Anu"	Gangotri Viswanath	Tina Kamal	4:11
Total length:				19:41
