= Dongala Bandi =

- DVD Cover
- Directed by: Satish Vegesna
- Written by: Satish Vegesna
- Starring: Allari Naresh; Tanya Vakil
- Cinematography: S. Arun Kumar
- Edited by: Nandamuri Hari
- Music by: Valluri Raja Sekhar
- Production company: GSK Network
- Release date: 12 December 2008
- Country: India
- Language: Telugu

Dongala Bandi (transl. Vehicle of thieves) is a 2008 Indian Telugu-language comedy film directed by Satish Vegesna and starring Allari Naresh and newcomer Tanya. The plot is treasure hunt of Nizam's looted treasury by the heirs of the robbers.

== Cast ==
- Allari Naresh as Krish
- Tanya Vakil as Aishwarya
- Malishka
- Ali as Tantia Tope / Tribal leader
- Venu Madhav as Pinakapani / Don Amrutapani
- Brahmanandam
- Jaya Prakash Reddy
- Master Bharath
- M. S. Narayana as Okka Magaadu
- Geetha Singh
- Chitram Srinu
- Venu Yeldandi
- Kovai Sarala as Aishwarya's sister
- Rao Ramesh
- Jeeva
- Shankar Melkote
- Kondavalasa
- Krishna Bhagavaan
- Rajitha
- Fish Venkat
- Gundu Sudarshan
- Suman Setty
- Shakeela
- Puja Bharati

== Production ==
Allari Naresh plays a thief after Gamyam and Blade Babji. This is the debut film of director Satish Vegesna.

== Soundtrack ==
Music is composed by Rajasekhar Valluri. The lyrics are written by Suddala Ashok Teja, Abhinaya Srinvas, and Surisetty Rama Rao.

1. "Amma Cheppindhi" - Ranjith
2. "Nelaku Jarene" - Rajasekhar
3. "Chetha Venna" - Rahul Nambiar, Shweta Pandit
4. "Oorori Mavayy" - Rajasekhar, Priya
5. "Sannajaji Pakka" - Manikka Vinayagam, Bhargavi Pillai
6. "Paka Paka Navvu" - Srinath, Sai Saritha, Madhu Priya, Sahithi, Shravya

== Reception ==
The Times of India gave the film a rating of two out of five stars and called the film "a misadventure". The Hindu opined that "Dongala Bandi succeeds in keeping Allari Naresh's fans and comedy genre lovers faithfully entertained and involved". Idlebrain wrote that "On a whole, Allari Naresh's Dongala Bandi disappoints big time".
