= Visakha Express (film) =

2008 Indian Telugu film

- Theatrical poster
- Directed by: Vara Mullapudi
- Screenplay by: Chandra Sekhar Yeleti; Harsha Vardhan (dialogues)
- Story by: Vara Mullapudi
- Based on: Strangers on a Train by Patricia Highsmith
- Produced by: P. Tulasi Gopal
- Starring: Allari Naresh; Rajiv Kanakala; Preeti Jhangiani; Sindhu Tolani
- Cinematography: P. K. H. Das
- Edited by: Ravindra Babu
- Music by: Vijay Kurakula
- Production company: Markwell Entertainment
- Release date: 8 February 2008
- Running time: 99 min
- Language: Telugu

Visakha Express is a 2008 Indian Telugu-language thriller film directed by Vara Mullapudi who co-wrote the film with Chandra Sekhar Yeleti and Harsha Vardhan. The film stars Allari Naresh, Rajiv Kanakala, Preeti Jhangiani, and Sindhu Tolani. The basic plot of the story is taken from Patricia Highsmith's novel Strangers on a Train (1950), which is about two strangers and an exchange of murders.

== Plot ==
Two strangers, Dr. Raja (Rajiv Kanakala) and Ravi Varma (Allari Naresh) meet each other on a train, Visakha Express. Raja is annoyed with the problems caused by his drunkard father (Kota Srinivasa Rao) and in an unconscious situation shares his problems with Ravi Varma. A few days later, his father injures himself in an accident and is brought to the hospital, who dies of poisoning and the blame is put on the doctor. In fact, it is Ravi Varma who has designed the death on the train.

Ravi Varma marries Suchitra (Preeti), who is an ex-girlfriend of Raja. Ravi Varma is dissatisfied with the relationship between his wife and Raja and wanted to eliminate her. So Ravi Varma kills Raja's father and throws that case on Raja. He also blackmails Raja that if he kills his wife Suchitra, he will save him. The remaining story is about how Raja saves his ex-girlfriend and kills Ravi Varma.

== Cast ==
- Rajiv Kanakala as Dr. Raja
- Allari Naresh as Ravi Varma
- Preeti Jhangiani as Suchitra
- Kota Srinivasa Rao as Mohan Rao, Raja's father
- Sindhu Tolani as Kokila
- Ali as Superintendent of Police
- Mumaith Khan as Geetha
- Vijaya Rangaraju as Inspector
- Dharmavarapu Subramanyam as Doctor
- Shankar Melkote as Dr. Melkote
- Narsing Yadav as Venu, wine shop owner
- Sivannarayana Naripeddi
- Raghu Karumanchi as Constable

== Soundtrack ==
01.Kasukku Sokulu 02.Mapatela Eeroju 03.Oh Prema 04.Mapreme Mapreme

== Reception ==
Reviewing the film for Rediff.com, Radhika Rajamani wrote, "The film, which starts off as a whodunit finally boils down to a question of personal vendetta. In the end we are left wondering whether it is worth two hours of sitting through the film to get to the ending." Sify rated the film 3/5 and stated, "Story is good, but the screenplay by Chandrasekhar Yeleti and direction by Vara are disappointing. As the audiences come out of the theatre, they would certainly sympathize with the story. A unanimous feeling that it has not been handled with skill pervades their judgment."
