= Nenu Pelliki Ready =

2003 Telugu-language film

- DVD Cover
- Directed by: Venky
- Written by: Venky; Satish Vegesna (dialogues)
- Produced by: Tammareddy Bharadwaja
- Starring: Srikanth; Laya; Sangeetha; Anita; Vidya
- Cinematography: Amar
- Music by: Chakri
- Production company: RPG Combines
- Distributed by: RPG Combines
- Release date: 14 November 2003
- Country: India
- Language: Telugu

Nenu Pelliki Ready (transl. I am ready to get married) is a 2003 Indian Telugu-language romantic comedy film directed by Venky and starring Srikanth, Laya, Sangeetha, Anita and Vidya.

== Plot ==
Gopi is a happy single man. Due to his grandparents' influence, he goes to a marriage bureau and chooses three women (Savitri, Bhavana, Neha). Gopi does not fall in love with the women although they all fall in love with him. The film is about how Gopi distances himself from them and falls in love with the bureau owner Priya.

== Cast ==
- Srikanth as Gopikrishna
- Laya as Bhavna
- Sangeeta as Priya
- Anita Hassanandani as Savithri
- Vidya as Neha
- M. S. Narayana as Gopikrishna's grandfather
- Sunil
- Mallikarjuna Rao
- Kondavalasa Lakshmana Rao
- Jeeva
- Dharmavarapu Subramanyam as doctor
- Ali
- Ananth as doctor
- Benarjee
- Gowtham Raju
- Ahuti Prasad
- Rama Prabha as Gopikrishna's grandmother
- Jayalalita
- Jenny

== Soundtrack ==
The music is composed by Chakri.

- "Nuvvunte Chaalu" (Male) - Hariharan
- "Gopalakrishna Pelli Kaavaala Gopemma Laanti Pilla Kaavaala"
- "Saavi One Saavi Two Saavi Three" - Smita, Shankar Mahadevan
- "Chandramukhi Chandramukhi" - Shankar Mahadevan
- "Nuvvunte Chaalu" (Female) - Sunitha
- "Neevu Nenu Okatele"
- "Mugguru Bhaamala Premala Mundara Bandheenayyane"

== Reception ==
G. Manjula Kumar of The Hindu wrote that "Though there is nothing new to write about the storyline, the dialogue, timing and good performances make Venki win the day despite a few glitches here and there". Rakesh P. of Deccan Herald wrote that "But, with the narration being slow, the comic banter fails to keep the audience engrossed. Nothing great about the music score by Chakri". Jeevi of Idlebrain.com opined that "Though director tried making this film a hilarious fare by inserting lots of comedy in it, he could not built the much needed tempo in narration". Manju Latha Kalanidhi of Full Hyderabad stated that "Director Venky makes a genuine attempt at comedy with this light comedy".
