= Thotti Gang =

- Directed by: E. V. V. Satyanarayana
- Written by: Satish Vegesna (dialogues)
- Screenplay by: E. V. V. Satyanarayana
- Story by: E. V. V. Satyanarayana
- Produced by: E. V. V. Satyanarayana
- Starring: Allari Naresh; Prabhu Deva; Anita Hassanandani; Sunil; Gajala
- Cinematography: Loganathan Srinivasan
- Edited by: Marthand K. Venkatesh
- Music by: Devi Sri Prasad
- Production company: E. V .V. Cinema
- Release date: 6 December 2002
- Country: India
- Language: Telugu

Thotti Gang (transl. Good for nothing fellows) is a 2002 Indian Telugu-language comedy film produced and directed by E. V. V. Satyanarayana starring Allari Naresh, Prabhu Deva, Sunil, Gajala and Anita Hassanandani. The movie was released on 6 December 2002 to positive reviews and was declared a hit at the box office. The film was based on 2001 American film Saving Silverman.

The film was dubbed and released in Tamil as Love Game with a separate comedy track featuring Livingston and Vennira Aadai Moorthy.

== Plot ==
Karate Mallishwari, a beautiful lawyer who has black belt in Karate. She sincerely loves Achi Babu. His friends don't like Mallishwari as she once kicked their asses for misbehaving with someone. So they try to break up Mallishwari and Achi Babu by kidnapping her. Before kidnapping her by drugging her, she uses her terrific karate skills to beat them down like they are flies. They beg for mercy but she doesn't grant it. They even hire two contract killers to kill Mallishwari. Mallishwari shows them who the boss by destroying them brutally. In the end, Mallishwari doesn't get Achi Babu. She is the tragic heroine in this comedy movie.

== Cast ==
- Allari Naresh as Achyuta Rama Rao alias "Achi Babu"
- Prabhu Deva as Suri Babu
- Sunil as Sathi Babu
- Anita Hassanandani as Venkata Lakshmi
- Gajala as Karate Malliswari
- Shakeela as Matasri
- L.B. Sriram as Alexander
- M. S. Narayana and Chalapathi Rao as Bongu Brothers
- Jaya Prakash Reddy in a Special Appearance
- Brahmanandam as Galigottam Govinda Sastry and also as his grandmother (dual role)
- Lakshmipati as Guravaiah
- Jyoti as Moogambika
- Rajitha

== Soundtrack ==
The soundtrack was composed by Devi Sri Prasad. In an audio review, Sreya Sunil of Idlebrain.com wrote that Devi Sri Prasad's "efforts to encourage new talents into the industry are praiseworthy".

Song title	Singers	Length
"Nuvve Kaavaali"	S. P. B. Charan, Sumangali	04:28
"Oh Oh Sodharaa"	Ranjith	05:26
"Vechhani Vechhani Deham"	K. S. Chithra, Rajesh Krishnan	05:22
"Orinayano"	Sandeep, Kalpana	05:15
"Gundello Nuvve"	Devi Sri Prasad, Febi Mani	05:23
"Kannepilla Are Kannepilla"	Karthik, Mathangi	05:28

== Reception ==
Jeevi of Idlebrain.com rated the film 3 out of 5 and wrote, "Over all it's an average film aimed at comedy-movie-lovers".
