= Nuvva Nena =

- Theatrical release poster
- Directed by: Pendyala Veera Venkata Sathya Narayana (Narayana)
- Screenplay by: Surya
- Produced by: Vamsi Krishna Srinivas
- Starring: Allari Naresh; Sharwanand; Shriya Saran
- Cinematography: Dasaradhi Sivendra
- Edited by: Marthand K. Venkatesh
- Music by: Songs: Bheems Ceciroleo; Background Score: Mani Sharma
- Production company: S.V.K Cinema
- Distributed by: S.V.K Cinema; BlueSky Cinemas
- Release date: 16 March 2012
- Running time: 127 minutes
- Country: India
- Language: Telugu

Nuvva Nena (transl. You or me) is a 2012 Indian Telugu-language romantic comedy film directed by debutante Pendyala Veera Venkata Sathya Narayana and produced by Vamsi Krishna under SVK Cinema banner. The film stars Shriya Saran, Allari Naresh, Sharvanand, and Vimala Raman in lead roles with Brahmanandam, Ali, Jeeva, Kovai Sarala, Srinivasa Reddy, and Narsing Yadav appearing in other significant roles. Bheems Ceciroleo composed the film's soundtrack with Mani Sharma providing the background score for the film. It is based on Hindi film Deewana Mastana.

== Plot ==
The movie is a romantic comedy about two guys, Avinash (Allari Naresh) and Anand (Sharwanand), who end up competing for the same girl, Nandini (Shriya Saran). Avinash is a small-time thief who lands in Hyderabad and instantly falls for Nandini, a beautiful doctor. At the same time, Anand, a rich and confident young man, is already in love with her.

What follows is a hilarious rivalry between Avinash and Anand as they try to outsmart each other to win Nandini's heart. They go to ridiculous lengths—playing pranks, trying to sabotage each other, and even teaming up temporarily when a gangster (Brahmanandam) gets involved.

As the story progresses, both guys realize that love isn't just about competition but about truly understanding and caring for the other person. The film has a mix of comedy, romance, and some unexpected twists before reaching its conclusion.

== Cast ==
- Shriya Saran as Dr. Nandhini
- Allari Naresh as Avinash
- Sharvanand as Anand
- Brahmanandam as Aaku Bhai
- Ali as Chanti
- Kovai Sarala as Pushpa
- Jeeva as Inspector
- Srinivasa Reddy as Hotel Waiter
- Narsing Yadav as Narsing Yadav
- Prabhas Sreenu as Thopu Seenu
- Fish Venkat as Aaku Bhai's henchman
- Raghu Karumanchi as Aaku Bhai's henchman
- Prudhviraj
- Raja as Raja (guest appearance)
- Vimala Raman in a cameo appearance

== Production ==
Nuvva Nena was the second film which had Allari Naresh and Sharvanand together after Gamyam (2008). The film is a remake of 1997 Deewana Mastana which had Govinda, Anil Kapoor and Juhi Chawla in the lead.

== Soundtrack ==
The audio of the film was released on 19 February 2012 through Aditya Music in the market and its consists of six songs. Lyrics for the three songs were written by Krishna Chaitanya and remaining three songs were written by Bheems Ceciroleo, Anantha Sreeram, Srimani.

Nuvva Nena

Soundtrack album by Bheems Ceciroleo
- Released: 19 February 2012
- Recorded: 2012
- Genre: Film soundtrack
- Length: 25:26
- Label: Aditya Music
- Producer: Bheems Ceciroleo

Bheems Ceciroleo chronology
Nuvva Nena (2012)	Kevvu Keka (2013)

Track listing
No.	Title	Lyrics	Singer(s)	Length
1.	"Blackberry"	Bheems Ceciroleo	Kailash Kher	3:51
2.	"Ayomayam"	Krishna Chaitanya	Ranjith, Suchitra	4:14
3.	"Tha Tha Thamara"	Anantha Sriram	Neha Bhasin, Sriram Chandra	5:38
4.	"Oy Pilla"	Srimani	Karunya	3:47
5.	"Polavaram"	Krishna Chaitanya	Naveen, Kalpana	4:23
6.	"Neeli Neeli"	Krishna Chaitanya	Haricharan	4:13
Total length:				25:26

== Reception ==
Karthik Pasupulate of The Times of India rated the film 3/5 stars and wrote, "Debutante director Narayana tries to play to the gallery without going over the top with dialogues or the slap stick comedy". Radhika Rajamani of Rediff.com rated the film 2.5/5 stars and wrote, "Nuvva Nena is a light-hearted caper and good for some hearty laughs". A critic from Deccan Herald wrote, "Narayana’s Nuvva Nena is breezy and boisterous as a ballyhoo flick full of bedlam. So, if comedy is your idea of fun at the movies, then it’s worth you while at the theatres".

== Home media ==
The film is streaming on Disney+Hotstar.
