= Laddu Babu =

2014 film by Ravi Babu

- Directed by: Ravi Babu
- Written by: Nivas
- Screenplay by: Satyanand
- Story by: Ravi Babu
- Produced by: Tripuraneni Rajendra
- Starring: Allari Naresh; Bhumika Chawla
- Cinematography: N. Sudhakar Reddy
- Edited by: Marthand K. Venkatesh
- Music by: Chakri
- Production company: Maharadhi Films
- Release date: 18 April 2014
- Country: India
- Language: Telugu

Laddu Babu is a 2014 Indian Telugu-language comedy film starring Allari Naresh and Bhumika Chawla, directed by Ravi Babu and produced by Tripuraneni Rajendra. Naresh wore prosthetics to portray his role as an obese man.

== Plot ==
Laddu Babu is a slim good looking man, until a mosquito laden with a strange virus bites him. Within months he becomes enormously obese in an irreversible condition. His unnatural size becomes a problem for his father Kishtayya because he wanted to get his son married fast. His son's wedding meant that Kishtayya would inherit his ancestral home which he planned to sell and move to Goa. But Laddu babu's size was making his plan difficult. More than his size it was his attitude that prevented him from marrying all the girls his father tried to set him up with. Laddu babu wanted to find true love in a dream girl.

In another part of the town Murthy, a ten-year-old boy who lived with his widowed mother Madhuri was making plans with his friends to make Laddu babu's life miserable because he refused to be friends with Murthy. Laddu babu meanwhile sets his eyes on Maya (Poorna) and falls in love with her. He starts making attempts to bump into her and woo her. But his enmity with Murthy comes in the way. Not knowing that they were destroying Laddu babu's love life, Murthy and gang torment Laddu babu and indirectly make sure that Laddu babu never got to woo Maya.

One day when Laddu babu doesn't go home on time (because of a Murthy prank) to meet a set of twin girls arranged by his father, he is thrown out of the house. As he sat by the roadside and wondered where to go, Murthy comes to his side, makes friends with him and takes him to his house. Laddu babu meets Madhuri, Murthy's mother who though initially reluctant, but yielding to Murthy's pressure doesn't mind having Laddu babu stay with them. Laddu babu's fortune suddenly turns around and Maya comes into his life in style. But what he did not know was that Maya had a fight with her handsome boyfriend and wanted to show him that she could actually settle for a very ugly guy. Laddu babu who did not know any of this, blissfully courts Maya.

Laddu babu steals money from Madhuri and uses it to get his flab surgically removed for Maya. Just then Maya makes up with her boyfriend and decides to marry him. She actually tells Laddu babu that she liked him better when he was fat. Laddu babu is heartbroken at this development and is even more shocked when he gets to know that the real reason Murthy had befriended him and taken him home was to marry his mother Madhuri. Torn between the guilt of having stolen from Madhuri who was so nice to him and the heart rending deceit of Maya, Laddu babu agrees to marry the twins his father had set up for him. If he married them he would make money that he could use to pay back Madhuri. The film suddenly takes a new turn with Murthy developing a chronic health condition.

Later, he drinks ghee, becomes fat, and goes to hospital when he gets to know about murthy's condition and the money was for operation for murthy. He goes to hospital and marries madhuri as it was the last wish of murthy(who died at the hospital)

== Cast ==
- Allari Naresh as Laddu Babu
- Bhumika Chawla as Madhuri
- Poorna as Maya
- Sreedhar Rao as Arjun
- Master Atulith as Murthy
- Kota Srinivasa Rao as Kishtayya
- Sameer as Murthy's Uncle
- Brahmanandam
- Ali
- Jaya Prakash Reddy
- Telangana Shakuntala
- M. S. Narayana
- AVS
- Giri Babu
- Rallapalli
- Kondavalasa Lakshmana Rao
- Ananth
- Venu Madhav (deleted scene)

== Music ==
Music for this movie was composed by Chakri.

| No. | Song | Singers | Length (m:ss) |
|---|---|---|---|
| 1 | "Laddu Babu" | Revanth | |
| 2 | "Muddugumma" | Pavan, Ishwarya | |
| 3 | "Koncham Koncham" | Chakri, Simha, Sindhuri | |
| 4 | "Sirimalli Sirimalli" | SriKrishna, Uma Neha | |
