= Allare Allari =

- Directed by: Muppalaneni Shiva
- Produced by: S. K. Basheed
- Starring: Venu; Allari Naresh; Parvati Melton; Mallika Kapoor
- Edited by: K. Ramesh
- Music by: Chakri
- Production company: Bajju Art Productions
- Release date: 10 August 2007
- Running time: 145 minutes
- Country: India
- Language: Telugu

Allare Allari is a 2007 Indian Telugu-language romantic comedy film starring Venu, Allari Naresh, Parvati Melton, Mallika Kapoor.

== Plot ==
Ramulamma kills two of the three people who have murdered her husband. She takes a promise from Bapineedu, her younger brother, that her daughter Priya should be taken care of and marry Anand and that her nephew Anand has to study well. The Kurnool district magistrate court awards a lifetime punishment to her.

Anand studies medicine and becomes a cardiologist. He stays in a flat at Brindavan Apartments. The daughter of Sutti Velu attempts suicide and gets admitted in Anand's hospital. Anand learns that she is pregnant and was deceived by a guy whose marriage is taking place on that day. Anand sees to it that the guy marries Velu's daughter in the registrar's office on the same day. Swapna demands Anand to pay seven lakhs as her marriage got cancelled due to Anand. Swapna and her father takes a flat on rent in the apartments where Dr. Anand resides. On one occasion, Anand sees Swapna in her bathroom. Swapna's father and other residents in that apartment demands that Anand marry Swapna. Anand tells to them about the promise his father made to Ramulamma. He agrees to marry Swathi through registered marriage.

Veera Babu works as a watchman in Brindavan Apartments. Anand treats him as a good friend. At the scheduled time, Anand had to attend an emergency case and hence could not turn up at the registrar's office. About the same time, Anand receives a phone call from Bapi Reddy that Anand has to receive Ramulamma at the Central Jail as she is getting released. Anand goes to the registrar office in search of Swapna and finds Veera Babu there. Both Anand and Veera Raju go to central jail to receive Ramulamma. As Veera Babu is in a well-tailored costly suit, Ramulamma believes that Veera Babu is her nephew. A few twists and turns lead to Anand marrying Swapna with Veera Babu marrying Priya with the approval of Ramulamma.

== Cast ==
- Allari Naresh as Veera Babu
- Venu Thottempudi as Dr. Anand
- Parvati Melton as Swathi
- Mallika Kapoor as Priya
- Telangana Shakuntala as Pulicherla Ramulamma
- Chalapathi Rao as Bapineedu
- Jeeva as C. I. Puliraju
- Raghu Babu as Paidi Raju
- Brahmanandam
- M. S. Narayana
- Dharmavarapu Subrahmanyam
- Mallikarjuna Rao
- Ali
- Krishna Bhagavan
- Narsing Yadav
- Kondavalasa
- Suthi Velu
- Venu Madhav
- Giri Babu
- Chandra Mohan
- Ananth
- Duvvasi Mohan
- Gautam Raju
- Shankar Melkote
- Kallu Krishna Rao
- Ragini
- Apoorva
- Allari Subhashini
- Bill Bitra
- Ruthika guest appearance in the song "Jigi Jigi Sona"

== Soundtrack ==
The soundtrack was composed by Chakri.

- "Laila Laila" - Javed Ali
- "Jigi Jigi" - Devan
- "Nuvvaina" - Chakri,Kousalya
- "Allare" - Karthik
- "Hello Killadi" - Raghu Kunche

== Reception ==
Idlebrain wrote "The movie would have worked if it did not fall flat in the last half an hour". Rediff wrote "all comedy films don't make a fortune at the box office, but the producers try to cash in on the mood of the audience. As a result, sometimes some very insipid comedy films hit the screen. One such endeavour is Allare Allari".
