= Wesley Degree College, Secunderabad =

Christian college in Secunderabad

Wesley Degree College
- Wesleyans
- Motto: The Utmost for the Highest
- Type: Co-educational
- Established: 1984; 42 years ago
- Founders: Christian Minority Society
- Parent institution: CSI Medak diocese
- Accreditation: NAAC
- Academic affiliations: Osmania University
- Principal: K.S. Devanand
- Head: B. John Kennedy
- Students: 1000 to 1300
- Undergraduates: Up to 600
- Postgraduates: Up to 500
- Location: Secunderabad, Begumpet, Telangana, India
- Campus: 9 acres (3.6 ha)
- Language: English
- Colors: Blue
- Sporting affiliations: Sports authority of Telangana state
- Website: wesleypgcollege.ac.in/staging

Wesley Degree College is a co-educational, grant-in-aid Christian Minority College affiliated to the Osmania University established in 1984 with a student body of around 1000 students. It offers courses like Bachelor of Arts, Bachelor of Commerce and Bachelor of Science. There is also a post graduate college in the same campus which provides courses like MBA and MCA.

== Accreditation ==
The institution was accredited with 'B' grade by NAAC.

== Courses ==
Undergraduate courses:

- B.Sc. Statistics
- B.Sc. Physics
- B.Sc. Electronics
- B.Com. Computers
- B.Com. (hons)
- B.com General
- Bachelor of Arts (B.A)

Post graduate courses

- MBA
- MCA

== Constituent colleges ==
- CSI- Wesley Institute of technology and sciences
- CSIIT - School of architecture and planning
- Wesley high school
- Wesley girls degree college

=== Wesley post-graduate college ===
Among the myriads of educational institutions established by the Church of South India, Medak Diocese, Wesley Post-Graduate College stands out, as an illustrious Academy for higher studies. Recognizing the need for professional studies, this college came into existence with effect from the academic year 1997–1998. The college is fully accredited by the AICTE, New Delhi,...

== Extra curriculars ==
=== National Cadet Corps ===
The National Cadet Corps is the youth wing of Armed Forces with its headquarters at New Delhi, Delhi, India. It is open to school and college students on voluntary basis. National Cadet Corps is a Tri-Services Organisation, comprising the Army, Navy and Air Wing, engaged in grooming the youth of the country into disciplined and patriotic citizens. The National Cadet Corps in India is a voluntary organisation which recruits cadets from high schools, higher secondary, colleges and universities all over India. The Cadets are given basic military training in small arms and drill. The officers and cadets have no liability for active military service once they complete their course. Unit: 1(T) Air squadron(hyd)
ANO: Flying Officer N.krishnaiah
(2019 - 2020):
CWO(Cadet warrant officer): Mukund Tandle

=== National Service Scheme ===
The National Service Scheme (NSS) is an Indian government-sponsored public service program conducted by the Ministry of Youth Affairs[1] and Sports of the Government of India. Popularly known as NSS, the scheme was launched in Gandhiji's Centenary year in 1969.

=== Sports ===
Wesley Degree College bagged the Osmania University (OU) Inter-College best physique championship for men at VV Degree College in Jambagh on Wednesday.

== Alumni ==
- Nani was born and brought up in Hyderabad, India. He did his schooling from St. Alphonsa's High School and then studied at Narayana Junior College, S.R Nagar before graduating from Wesley College.
- Sharwanand has completed his Bachelor of Commerce (B.Com.) from Wesley Degree College(Secunderabad) During his college days, Sharwanand was selected as "The Hindu's Best New Face".
- Uday Kiran was born on 26 June 1980[1] to Telugu-speaking Brahmin family of VVK Murthy and Nirmala. He did his schooling from K V Picket, near Jubilee Bus Stand, Hyderabad[11] and graduated in commerce from Wesley Degree College, Secunderabad.

== Facilities ==
- Library
- Auditorium
- Playground
- Cafeteria
