= Maa Alludu Very Good =

- DVD cover
- Directed by: E. V. V. Satyanarayana
- Written by: Janardhana Maharshi (dialogues)
- Screenplay by: E. V. V. Satyanarayana
- Story by: E. V. V. Satyanarayana
- Produced by: M.Ramalinga Raju
- Starring: Rajendra Prasad; Allari Naresh; Ramya Krishna; Mounika
- Cinematography: V. Srinivasa Reddy
- Edited by: Gautham Raju
- Music by: M. M. Keeravani
- Production company: Roja Movies
- Release date: 6 December 2003
- Running time: 143 mins
- Country: India
- Language: Telugu

Maa Alludu Very Good (transl. Our son-in-law is very good) is a 2003 Telugu-language comedy film directed by E. V. V. Satyanarayana. Starring Rajendra Prasad, Allari Naresh, Ramya Krishna, and Mounika with music composed by M. M. Keeravani. The film became commercially successful.

== Cast ==
- Rajendra Prasad as A. V. Rao
- Allari Naresh as Parasuram
- Ramya Krishna as Prabhavathi
- Mounika as Meghana
- Brahmanandam as Variety Pullaiah
- Kovai Sarala as A. V. Rao's mother
- M. S. Narayana as Dentist
- Mallikarjuna Rao as Driver
- Chalapathi Rao as Prabhavathi's father
- L. B. Sriram
- Kondavalasa as C. I. Vishnu Mani
- Lakshmipathi as Watchman
- Krishna Bhagavaan as Police officer
- Raghu Babu
- Rami Reddy as Anna Seth
- Bandla Ganesh as Watchman
- Surya
- Allari Subhashini as Hostel Warden
- Karate Kalyani as Anna Seth's wife
- Ramya Sri
- Chitti Babu as Police officer
- Ananth as Police officer

== Soundtrack ==
Maa Alludu Very Good

Soundtrack album by M. M. Keeravani
- Released: 2003
- Genre: Soundtrack
- Length: 28:52
- Label: Aditya Music
- Producer: M. M. Keeravani

M. M. Keeravani chronology
Pilisthe Palukutha (2003)	Maa Alludu Very Good (2003)	Nenunnanu (2004)

Music composed by M. M. Keeravani. Lyrics written by Chandrabose. Music released on Aditya Music Company.

Track List
No.	Title	Singer(s)	Length
1.	"Mutyala Pallakilo"	SP Charan, Chitra	4:49
2.	"Nee Dumpatega"	Udit Narayan, Chitra	4:44
3.	"Pellantu Chesukunte"	Ravi Varma, Kousalya	4:40
4.	"Paluke Bangaramayene"	S. P. Balasubrahmanyam, Sunitha	4:38
5.	"Mavagaru Pilla Nachindi"	S. P. Balasubrahmanyam, SP Charan, Pallavi	4:42
6.	"Padaka Padaka"	M.M.Keeravani, Sunitha	5:06
Total length:			28:52

== Reception ==
Jeevi of Idlebrain.com rated the film 3/5 and wrote, "Over all it's an average film with good comedy packed in it. Its definitely better than any of the recent offerings by EVV Satyanarayana".

== Home media ==
The film is streaming on Sun NXT.
