= Sathamanam Bhavati =

2017 film by Satish Vegesna

- Directed by: Satish Vegesna
- Written by: Satish Vegesna
- Screenplay by: Satish Vegesna
- Story by: Satish Vegesna
- Produced by: Dil Raju
- Starring: Sharwanand; Anupama Parameswaran; Prakash Raj; Jayasudha
- Narrated by: Murali Mohan
- Cinematography: Sameer Reddy
- Edited by: Madhu
- Music by: Mickey J. Meyer
- Production company: Sri Venkateswara Creations
- Release date: 14 January 2017
- Running time: 133 minutes
- Country: India
- Language: Telugu
- Budget: ₹8 crores
- Box office: ₹53–55 crores (Note: International Business Times India estimates the film worldwide gross to be ₹535 million (US$5.6 million). Deccan Chronicle estimates the film worldwide gross to be ₹550 million (US$5.7 million).)

Sathamanam Bhavati (transl. May you live long for 100 years) is a 2017 Indian Telugu-language family drama written and directed by Satish Vegesna. The film is produced by Dil Raju under Sri Venkateswara Creations and stars Sharwanand, Anupama Parameswaran, Prakash Raj and Jayasudha in key roles. An ensemble cast including Naresh, Indraja, Raja Ravindra, Shiju, Himaja, and Sithara plays supporting roles. Sathamanam Bhavati deals with the themes of "tradition-technology conflict", "joint family vs nuclear family", and "midlife crisis".

The score and soundtrack are composed by Mickey J. Meyer, and cinematography is by Sameer Reddy. The film released worldwide on 14 January 2017 to critical acclaim and coinciding with Sankranti. The screenplay of the film was archived at the Oscar Library. The film has received the Best Popular Film Providing Wholesome Entertainment at the 64th National Film Awards "in appreciation of providing a feeling of jubilation by respecting family values in an unexplored manner". The film has also won the state Nandi Award for Best Director, Nandi Award for Best Home Viewing Feature Film, and the state Telangana Gaddar Film Award for Best Feature Film.

== Plot ==
Raghavaraju is a farming landlord in Atreyapuram village of Andhra Pradesh. He lives with his wife Janakamma, along with his nephew Bangararaju, his wife and their son Raju. Raghavaraju lives in his ancestral house built by his forefathers consisting of many generations living in the same household as a joint family. However, with changing times, Ragahvaraju's two sons, Ravi and Kalyan and daughter Jhansi live in the United States, Canada, and Australia respectively as nuclear families. After a gap of 10 years, all of his children arrive in the village during the holiday season of Makara Sankranti, under mysterious circumstances after they receive an email from Raghavaraju, who expresses his wish to divorce his wife.

Nithya is the daughter of Jhansi. Soon Nithya and Raju fall in love but do not express it to each other. The siblings soon reunite. Raju and Nithya set up a meeting of their uncle with his old love interest. However, Jhansi asks Raju not to keep up his hopes on Nithya's love, which he does but which leaves Nithya heartbroken.

Raghavaraju and Janakamma reveal that they are not going to divorce but getting separated from each other, while Janakamma wants to live with her children. Raghavaraju wants to see his wife happy, so he emails his children so that they can come home and take their mother with them. Raju sent the divorce papers to a lawyer to make them understand the value of family. After Raghavaraju's words, they felt sorry for avoiding their parents. Jhansi accepts Nithya and Raju's marriage and their marriage was accepted by the whole family. All of them celebrate Sankranti and promise to come back for celebrating Ugadi with their family, while Nithya expresses her wish to stay with her grandparents, Raju and his parents.

== Cast ==
- Prakash Raj as Raghavaraju, Janakamma's husband and Bangarraju's uncle
- Jayasudha as Janakamma, Raghavaraju's wife
- Sharwanand as Raju, Bangarraju's son and Raghavaraju and Janakamma's grandson
- Anupama Parameswaran as Nithya, Jhansi's daughter, Raghavaraju and Janakamma's granddaughter, Raju's cousin and love interest, NRI from Australia
- Naresh as Bangarraju, Raju's father
- Indraja as Jhansi, Nithya's mother
- Raja Ravindra as Kishore, Nithya's father
- Shiju A R as Ravi Varma
- Himaja as Subbalakshmi
- Sithara as Sudha
- Praveen as Raju's friend
- Prabhas Sreenu as Raju's friend
- Ravi Prakash as Raju's friend
- Chalapathi Rao as Kishore's father
- Y. Kasi Viswanath
- Mirchi Madhavi as Parvathy, Raju's Mother and Bangarraju's wife
- Satish
- Ravikanth
- Racha Ravi
- Meena Kumari
- Dil Raju in a cameo appearance
- Tanikella Bharani as Chalaram (cameo)
- Sriram Venkat as Kalyan

== Production ==
=== Development ===
The idea of Sathamanam Bhavati originated in the 1990s. Director Sathish Vegesna wrote a short story Palle Payanam Etu?, which was written as part of a single-page short story competition conducted by Andhra Prabha. The story was then rejected and not published. Later, in early 2015, Vegesna decided to make a feature film based on the same story.

=== Casting ===
In September 2015, Sai Dharam Tej has signed two projects for Dil Raju under Sri Venkateswara Creations, which were Supreme directed by Anil Ravipudi and Sathamanam Bhavati by Satish Vegesna. In February 2016, Sai Dharam Tej has opted out due to schedule conflicts and replaced by Raj Tarun alongside Anupama Parameswaran. Later in May 2016, Raj Tarun was replaced by Sharwanand as lead in the film. After performing well in two Telugu films Premam (2016) and A Aa (2016), Anupama was cast to play the role Nithya, an NRI from Australia.

=== Filming ===
The film was officially launched on 27 August 2016 and muhurtam shot was also done. The principal photography of the film began in Amalapuram, Andhra Pradesh in September 2016. completed by. Few scenes were filmed at Thalluru, nearby Rajahmundry. Filming was wrapped up on 28 November 2016 within 49 days.

== Soundtrack ==
Shatamanam Bhavati

Film score by Mickey J. Meyer
- Released: 18 December 2016
- Recorded: 2016
- Genre: Soundtrack
- Length: 18:24
- Label: Aditya Music
- Producer: Mickey J. Meyer

Mickey J. Meyer chronology
Okka Ammayi Thappa (2016)	Shatamanam Bhavati (2016)	Mister (2017)

Music is composed by Mickey J. Meyer. The album was released by Aditya Music company.

Track-List
No.	Title	Lyrics	Singer(s)	Length
1.	"Mellaga Tellarindoi"	Sri Mani	Anurag Kulkarni, Ramya Behara, Mohana Bhogaraju	4:12
2.	"Shatamanam Bhavati"	Ramajogayya Sastry	K. S. Chithra, Vijay Yesudas	3:21
3.	"Naalo Nenu"	Ramajogayya Sastry	Sameera Bharadwaj	3:46
4.	"Nilavade"	Ramajogayya Sastry	S. P. Balasubrahmanyam	2:52
5.	"Hailo Hailessare"	Sri Mani	Aditya Iyengar, Rohith Paritala, Mohana Bhogaraju, Divya Divakar	4:13
Total length:				18:24

== Home media ==
The film was dubbed in Hindi as S/O Krishnamurthy and released by Aditya Movies in September 2019. It was also dubbed in Tamil under the same name. The television broadcast rights of the film were acquired by Zee Telugu. The film was premiered on 26 March 2017 and registered a TRP rating of 15.4. Later it was made available on ZEE5.

== Reception ==
=== Box office ===
Made on budget of ₹80 million (equivalent to ₹120 million or US$1.3 million in 2026), the film collected a gross of ₹107 million (equivalent to ₹160 million or US$1.7 million in 2026) and distributor's share of ₹60 million (equivalent to ₹92 million or US$950,000 in 2026) in its opening week. Mint reported that the film collected a gross of $653,664 (₹44.5 million) in the United States in the first two weeks since its release. The film was exhibited for 100 days in few movie theaters across the Telugu states. In late April 2017, a success meet was held for the film's 100 days theatrical run.

=== Critical response ===
Upon release, the film received critical acclaim from critics. Various critics praised Vegesna's screenplay. Srividya Palaparthi of The Times of India gave the film three stars out of five and commented, "Sathamanam Bhavathi doesn't offer much as a film. However, this is the holiday season, and if you wanted watch a laid-back low-risk film with your family, there couldn't be a better choice." and also praised cinematography done by Sameer Reddy. The Hindu's Srivathsan Nadadhur quoted the film as "rightly peppered for the festive season" and "an ideal family watch". He further added that the film gets its balance right predominantly due to the performances, humour and Mickey J. Meyer's music.

Writing for Deccan Chronicle, Pranita Jonnalagedda gave mixed review about the film and felt that the music compositions by Mickey J. Meyer have similarities with other films like Brahmotsavam, Seethamma Vakitlo Sirimalle Chettu and A Aa. She also criticized of the predictability of most of the scenes in the film. Jeevi of Idlebrain praised the dialogues written Vegesna's which explored morals and relationships. On a whole, he wrote that "Sathamanam Bhavati has elements and intent that attract family crowds this festival season."

== Legacy ==
Following the success of the film, Vegesna further directed two family drama films Srinivasa Kalyanam (2018) and Entha Manchivaadavuraa (2020). Both films have similar plot, focusing more on "tradition-technology conflict", "joint family vs nuclear family" and "age-old wedding traditions".

Sangeetha Devi Dundoo of The Hindu listed Sathamanam Bhavati among "Top 10 Telugu films of 2017". It was also featured on The Indian Express's "2017's best Telugu films" article, written by Manoj Kumar R.

== Accolades ==
Award (Note: Awards are in Alphabetical order.)	Date of ceremony (Note: Date is linked to the article about the awards held that year, wherever possible.)	Category	Recipient(s)	Result	Ref.
65th Filmfare Awards South	16 June 2018	Best Film – Telugu	Sathamanam Bhavati	Nominated	
65th Filmfare Awards South	16 June 2018	Best Director – Telugu	Satish Vegesna	Nominated	
65th Filmfare Awards South	16 June 2018	Best Supporting Actor – Telugu	Prakash Raj	Nominated	
65th Filmfare Awards South	16 June 2018	Best Supporting Actress – Telugu	Jayasudha	Nominated	
65th Filmfare Awards South	16 June 2018	Best Music Director – Telugu	Mickey J. Meyer	Nominated	
65th Filmfare Awards South	16 June 2018	Best Lyricist – Telugu	Ramajogayya Sastry – "Sathamanam Bhavathi"	Nominated	
65th Filmfare Awards South	16 June 2018	Best Male Playback Singer – Telugu	Anurag Kulkarni – "Mellaga Tellarindoi"	Nominated	
Nandi Awards of 2016	14 November 2017	Akkineni Award for Best Home-viewing Feature Film	Dil Raju	Won	
Nandi Awards of 2016	14 November 2017	Best Director	Satish Vegesna	Won	
Nandi Awards of 2016	14 November 2017	Best Music Director	Mickey J. Meyer	Won	
Nandi Awards of 2016	14 November 2017	Best Supporting Actress	Jayasudha	Won	
Nandi Awards of 2016	14 November 2017	Best Character Actor	Naresh	Won	
Nandi Awards of 2016	14 November 2017	Best Cinematographer	Sameer Reddy	Won	
64th National Film Awards	3 May 2017	Best Popular Film Providing Wholesome Entertainment	Satish Vegesna and Dil Raju	Won	
7th South Indian International Movie Awards	14–15 September 2018	Best Film (Telugu)	Sathamanam Bhavati – Dil Raju	Nominated	
7th South Indian International Movie Awards	14–15 September 2018	Best Director (Telugu)	Satish Vegesna	Nominated	
7th South Indian International Movie Awards	14–15 September 2018	Best Cinematographer (Telugu)	Sameer Reddy	Nominated	
7th South Indian International Movie Awards	14–15 September 2018	Best Supporting Actor (Telugu)	Prakash Raj	Nominated	
7th South Indian International Movie Awards	14–15 September 2018	Best Supporting Actress (Telugu)	Jayasudha	Nominated	
7th South Indian International Movie Awards	14–15 September 2018	Best Comedian (Telugu)	Praveen	Nominated	
7th South Indian International Movie Awards	14–15 September 2018	Best Lyricist (Telugu)	Ramajogayya Sastry – "Nilavade"	Nominated	
16th Santosham Film Awards	26 August 2018	Best Supporting Actor	Naresh	Won	

== See also ==
- Ammammagarillu
- Prati Roju Pandage
