= Shanoor Sana =

Indian actress and model

- Born: Shanoor Sana Begum; Hyderabad, Telangana, India
- Occupations: Actress, model
- Years active: 1994 - present
- Spouse: Sadath
- Children: 2, including Syed Anwar Ahmed (son)
- Relatives: Sameera Sherief (Daughter-in-law)

Shanoor Sana Begum, known mononymously as Sana, is an Indian actress, television personality, and former model who primarily works in Telugu cinema. She has also appeared in a few Kannada and Tamil films. Known for her supporting roles, Sana has acted in over 200 films across South Indian languages.

== Biography ==
She was born to a Christian father and Muslim mother in Hyderabad, Telangana. She was married to Sadath at her teenage even before completing her studies. Her son Syed Anwar Ahmed is a filmmaker and her daughter-in-law Sameera Sherief is a television actress.

== Career ==
She initially pursued her career in modelling. She got the opportunity in film acting from director Krishna Vamsi while she was busy with television and modelling assignments. Director Krishna Vamsi was in search for a suitable actress to play the supporting role in his 1996 film Ninne Pelladatha and signed Sana to play the supporting role and it eventually marked her acting debut. The film was acclaimed and was a successful venture at the box office which starred Nagarjuna in the lead role.

Since then she appeared mostly in Telugu films as supporting actress. Her performance was praised in the role of Kaikeyi in the 2011 film Sri Rama Rajyam and was also critically acclaimed for her performance for the negative role in the 2011 film Rajapattai. In 2016, she played a vamp in the Kannada film Silk Sakkath Maga. In 2018, she made her television acting debut with Tamil soap opera Ponmagal Vanthal.

In May 2020, she started her own YouTube channel teaching cooking methods along with her daughter-in-law Sameera Sherief.

== Filmography ==
=== Telugu ===
| † | Denotes films that have not yet been released |

| Year | Film | Role | Notes |
|---|---|---|---|
| 1996 | Ninne Pelladatha | | |
| 1997 | High Class Atta Low Class Alludu | | |
| 1998 | Aavida Maa Aavide | Head constable Victoria | |
| 1998 | Suryavamsam | Ravi Prasad's wife | |
| 1998 | Pandaga | | |
| 1998 | Ganesh | Priya's sister | |
| 1998 | Sri Ramulayya | | |
| 1998 | Premante Idera | Shailu's aunty | |
| 1998 | Deergha Sumangali Bhava | Vani's friend | |
| 1999 | Raja | Jaya | |
| 1999 | English Pellam East Godavari Mogudu | | |
| 1999 | Rajakumarudu | | |
| 2000 | Kalisundam Raa | Parvathi | |
| 2000 | Kodanda Ramudu | Tourist | |
| 2000 | Goppinti Alludu | Achyutha Rammaiah's daughter | |
| 2000 | Ammo! Okato Tareekhu | | |
| 2000 | Suri | | |
| 2001 | Pandanti Samsaram | | |
| 2001 | Snehamante Idera | Padmini's aunt | |
| 2001 | Athanu | | |
| 2001 | Bhadrachalam | | |
| 2002 | Nee Premakai | | |
| 2002 | Pilisthe Palukutha | | |
| 2002 | Siva Rama Raju | Veeraraju's wife | |
| 2002 | Ninu Choodaka Nenundalenu | | |
| 2003 | Ee Abbai Chala Manchodu | Bharathi's mother | |
| 2003 | Idi Maa Ashokgadi Love Story | Ashok's mother | |
| 2003 | Ottesi Cheputunna | | |
| 2003 | Kalyana Ramudu | Kalyani's mother | |
| 2003 | Aadanthe Ado Type | | |
| 2004 | Apuroopam | | |
| 2004 | Kaasi | | |
| 2004 | Malliswari | Malliswari's paternal aunt | |
| 2004 | Puttintiki Ra Chelli | | |
| 2004 | Seshadri Naidu | | |
| 2004 | Ammayi Bagundi | Satya's mother | |
| 2004 | Aaptudu | | |
| 2004 | Swarabhishekam | | |
| 2005 | Nuvvostanante Nenoddantana | Lalli's mother | |
| 2005 | Orey Pandu | Priya's mother | |
| 2005 | Bhadra | | |
| 2005 | Athadu | | |
| 2005 | Gowtam SSC | | |
| 2005 | Premikulu | | |
| 2005 | Vennela | Pavani's mother | Uncredited role |
| 2006 | Chukkallo Chandrudu | Shravani's aunt | |
| 2006 | Raam | Janaki's mother | |
| 2006 | Kithakithalu | | |
| 2006 | Veerabhadra | | |
| 2007 | Premalekha Ras | | |
| 2007 | Sri Mahalakshmi | Olga Rose Mary | |
| 2007 | Pellaindi Kaani | | |
| 2007 | Nava Vasantham | Anjali's mother | |
| 2007 | Chandrahas | | |
| 2007 | Takkari | Guru's wife | |
| 2008 | Krishna | Bobby's wife | |
| 2008 | Andamaina Manasulo | Bindu's mother | |
| 2008 | Gautama Buddha | Prajapathi Gouthami | |
| 2008 | Bhale Dongalu | Lakshmi | |
| 2008 | Pandurangadu | Pundarika Ranganadu's sister | |
| 2008 | Veedu Mamoolodu Kadu | Swathi's mother | |
| 2009 | Anjaneyulu | Anjali's mother | |
| 2009 | Samardhudu | | |
| 2010 | Betting Bangaraju | | |
| 2010 | Thakita Thakita | Chandana's mother | |
| 2010 | Buridi | | |
| 2010 | Saradaga Kasepu | | |
| 2010 | Brindaavanam | Bhoomi's aunt | |
| 2010 | Nagavalli | | |
| 2010 | Ragada | | |
| 2011 | Vykuntapali | Dr. Padma | |
| 2011 | Sri Rama Rajyam | Kaikeyi | |
| 2012 | Bodyguard | Venkatadri's mother | |
| 2012 | Daruvu | Swetha's mother | |
| 2012 | Mem Vayasuku Vacham | Dil's mother | |
| 2012 | Rebel | Nandini's friend | |
| 2012 | Lucky | Lucky's mother | |
| 2012 | Yamudiki Mogudu: Ee Nela Thakkuvodu | | |
| 2012 | Sarocharu | | |
| 2012 | Sri Vasavi Vaibhavam | | |
| 2013 | Priyathama Neevachata Kusalama | | |
| 2013 | Jai Sriram | Sriram's mother | |
| 2013 | Balupu | Rohit's mother | |
| 2013 | Kevvu Keka | | |
| 2013 | Jagadguru Adi Shankara | Saraswati | |
| 2014 | Yevadu | Deepthi's mother | |
| 2014 | Jump Jilani | Dharmavaddi Dharmaraju's wife | |
| 2014 | Nuvvala Nenila | | |
| 2014 | Anukshanam | a mother | |
| 2015 | Malli Malli Idi Rani Roju | Nazeera's mother | |
| 2015 | Dohchay | Meera's mother | |
| 2016 | A Aa | Latha | |
| 2016 | Naanna Nenu Naa Boyfriends | Paddu's mother | |
| 2016 | Meelo Evaru Koteeswarudu | | |
| 2016 | Intlo Deyyam Nakem Bhayam | | |
| 2017 | Maa Abbayi | Abbayi's mother | |
| 2017 | Duvvada Jagannadham | Pooja's mother | |
| 2017 | Gulf | Karunakka | |
| 2017 | Raja the Great | Lucky's aunt | |
| 2018 | Hyderabad Love Story | | |
| 2018 | Juvva | | |
| 2019 | Maharshi | | |
| 2019 | Voter | Bhavana's mother | |
| 2019 | Krishna Rao Supermarket | | |
| 2021 | Aaradugula Bullet | Nayana's mother | |
| 2021 | Deyyam | | |
| 2023 | Prathyardhi | Jaya | |
| 2023 | Ranga Maarthaanda | | |
| 2023 | Nireekshana | Rathnamala | |
| 2024 | Devara: Part 1 | Kunjara's wife | |

=== Kannada ===
| Year | Film | Role |
|---|---|---|
| 2001 | Huchcha | Kiccha's sister-in-law |
| 2002 | Chandu | Chandu's sister |
| 2006 | Tirupathi | Bharathi |
| 2007 | Police Story 2 | Godmother Thimakka |
| 2010 | Crazy Kutumba | |
| 2013 | Dirty Picture: Silk Sakkath Maga | Ammani |
| 2014 | Namaste Madam | |

=== Tamil ===
| Year | Film | Role | Notes |
|---|---|---|---|
| 2010 | Easan | Woman watching TV | Uncredited role |
| 2011 | Rajapattai | Ranganayaki | |
| 2016 | Enakku Veru Engum Kilaigal Kidayathu | Caravan Krishna's wife | |
| 2017 | Aayirathil Iruvar | | |
| 2020 | Ka Pae Ranasingam | Central minister | |
| 2023 | Kannitheevu | | |

=== Malayalam ===
| Year | Film | Role | Notes |
|---|---|---|---|
| 2001 | Kakkakuyil | Sivaraman's sister | |
| 2012 | Simhasanam | Hemalatha Gundappa | |

=== Hindi ===
- Durga (2002)
- Tathagatha Buddha (2008)

=== Television ===
- Devi Bhagavatham (Mythology) Gemini TV.2004
- Pranaya Prabandham (Leading Lady) DD Hyderabad-1994
- Halahalam (ACP Goutami) DD Hyderabad-1996
- Ananda Dhara (Rani Rudrama Devi) DD Hyderabad-1996
- Jeevitham (female lead's mom) Etv
- Chakravakam (Hema)
- Ponmagal Vanthal (2018–2020) as Rajeshwari
- Adi Parashakti
- Siri Siri Muvvalu (2019–2020)
- Aravinda Sametha (2020–2021)
