= Sundarakanda (2008 film) =

- Directed by: Bapu
- Written by: Mullapudi Venkata Ramana
- Starring: Charmi; Allari Naresh
- Cinematography: P. R. K. Raju
- Edited by: A. Sreekar Prasad
- Music by: Vidyasagar
- Release date: 8 February 2008
- Country: India
- Language: Telugu

Sundarakanda is a 2008 Indian Telugu-language drama film directed by Bapu, starring Charmme Kaur and Allari Naresh. The story is provided by Mullapudi Ramana and music by Vidyasagar. This film is the remake of Hollywood film What a Girl Wants (2003).

== Plot ==
Pinky (Charmi) is the daughter of Sita (Prema), who keeps away from her husband. On Pinky's insistence, Sita reveals the past. She met Raja Ravivarma (Sunil Sharma), the son of Zamindar Surendra Varma (Ranganath) on a study tour of a tribal village. They fell in love and got married then and there. His son's marriage with Sita, a commoner, gave such a shock to Surendra Varma that he lost the use of his legs. Ravivarma's mother Bharati (Sangeetha) pleaded with Sita to leave the palace to save the family honor. After Sita left, Bhushanam (Vizag Prasad), Surendra Varma's brother-in-law, raises a hue and cry that Sita stole gold ornaments from the palace and escaped. Being so discredited even in the eyes of her love and husband, she stayed away.

Now, the story revolves around Pinky's efforts to reunite her parents. She is a lively girl trying to make friends with her father's family. She pretends to be sent by the party bosses to pick the candidate for minister's post. She dabbles in this political charade with the help of Naresh (Allari Naresh), a journalist. Her father's opponent Kota (Kota Srinivasa Rao), who is also an aspiring candidate for the Chief Minister post, and his mates provide the comedy and political satire. She succeeds in reuniting the family and exposing the villains. Music with lyrics reminding one of the tribal idiom is a treat. The visuals with the rustic outdoor and the heavily ornate interiors of a feudal gentry have the stamp of Bapu.

== Cast ==
- Charmi as Pinky
- Allari Naresh as Naresh, journalist
- Prema as Sita
- Sunil Sharma as Raja Ravi Varma
- Kota Srinivasa Rao as Kota
- Sangeetha as Bharathi
- Vizag Prasad as Bhushanam
- Ranganath as Zamindar Surendra Varma
- Kondavalasa Lakshmana Rao
- Chittajalu Lakshmipati
- L. B. Sriram
- Rallapalli

== Soundtrack ==
Sundarakanda

Soundtrack album by Vidyasagar
- Released: 25 January 2008
- Recorded: Varsha Vallaki Studios
- Genre: Feature Film Soundtrack
- Length: 17:18
- Language: Telugu
- Label: Aditya Music
- Producer: Vidyasagar

Vidyasagar chronology
Pirivom Santhippom (2008)	Sundarakanda (2008)	Mulla (2008)

The music was composed by Vidyasagar.

Song	Singers
"Aaku Vakka"	S. P. Sailaja, Sujatha Mohan
"Okato Yeta Rendo"	K. S. Chithra
"Eloo Eloo Vuyyala"	Sadhana Sargam
"Kalagantini"	K. S. Chithra
"HamPattu Devudandi"	S. P. Balasubrahmanyam

== Reception ==
A critic from Rediff.com wrote that "Anyone who respect for Bapu - Ramana, for their great earlier movies, feel disappointed with this old-fashioned flick". A critic from Rediff.com rated the film two-and-a-half out of five stars and wrote that "Sundarakanda is certainly not a Bapu film".
