= Bendu Apparao R.M.P =

- Directed by: E. V. V. Satyanarayana
- Written by: Veligonda Srinivas (dialogues)
- Screenplay by: E. V. V. Satyanarayana
- Produced by: D. Ramanaidu
- Starring: Allari Naresh; Kamna Jethmalani; Meghana Raj
- Cinematography: V. Jayaram
- Edited by: Gautham Raju
- Music by: Koti
- Production company: Suresh Productions
- Release date: 16 October 2009
- Country: India
- Language: Telugu
- Box office: ₹10 crore distributors' share

Bendu Apparao R.M.P is a 2009 Indian Telugu-language romantic comedy film written and directed by E. V. V. Satyanarayana, and produced by D. Ramanaidu. The film stars Allari Naresh, Kamna Jethmalani and Meghana Raj in lead roles. It has music composed by Koti.

The film was made on a budget of ₹3 crore and was released with 35 prints on 16 October 2009 in Andhra Pradesh. It opened to positive reviews and was successful at the box office, collecting a distributor's share of ₹10 crore.

== Plot ==
Bendu Appa Rao is an RMP doctor in a tiny village in East Godavari. Though he has little knowledge about medicine, he uses his brain to come out of critical situations. He earns money by all means as his sister faces torture at the hands of her husband, as he could not pay the entire dowry to him. He maintains close relationships and friendships with everyone in the village, including a barber, tailor, washerman, postman, and pune.

Sagi Suryanarayana Raju is a landlord. His only daughter Padma falls in love with Appa Rao, who too loses his heart to her. Once, Appa Rao and his friends, while returning to the village after watching a movie, find a grievously injured person, Sivaji. Before breathing his last, he pleads with Appa Rao to hand over Rs 15 lakh to his family. Despite much pressure from his friends to share the money among themselves, Appa Rao makes several efforts to give the money to Sivaji's kin.

On learning that Sivaji's parents are no more and his sister left the country after marrying, Appa Rao agrees to share the money between the tailor, barber, and himself. He gives them Rs 2 lakh each to settle their debts; he also takes part of the money to settle his sister's life. He utilizes the remaining balance to build a school in the village and names it after Sivaji. However, Appa Rao makes everyone believe they won a prize in the lottery.

Sivaji's parents and sister accidentally reach the village, and Appa Rao learns the truth. He feels guilty as he had already spent the money, so he mortgages his house to a local trader and spends it on Sivaji's father's bypass surgery. He also promises to marry Sivaji's sister, sacrificing his love with Padma. However, on the day of the marriage, the village president tells Gayathri that Appa Rao killed Sivaji, robbed the money, and wants to marry Gayathri to avoid future legal problems. Gayathri believes this, and Appa Rao is beaten severely, but Raju and the local trader reveal the truth and save him. In the end, Appa Rao marries Padma, as Gayathri understands their love.

== Cast ==
- Allari Naresh as Bendu Appa Rao R.M.P
- Kamna Jethmalani as Padma
- Meghana Raj as Gayathri
- Krishna Bhagavaan as Appa Rao's brother-in-law
- Ahuti Prasad as Sagi Suryanarayana Raju, Padma's father
- Raghu Babu as Soori Babu Raju's servant
- L. B. Sriram as Samaram (rooster) feeder
- Dharmavarapu Subramanyam as Mudhu Krishna [Donga Doctor]
- Suman Setty as Ganesh [compounder]
- Telangana Shakuntala as Padma's grandmother
- Srinivasa Reddy as Tailor
- Uttej as Barber
- Ali as Dubai Broker alias Dubai Seenu (Fraudster)
- Chalapathi Rao as Village Sarpanch
- Kondavalasa Lakshmana Rao as Postman
- Ananth as Raju's permanent guest
- Ravi Prakash as Shivaji, Gayathri's brother
- Jeeva as money lender/sweet shop owner
- Ramya Chowdary as Tailor (Srinivasa Reddy)'s cousin (sister-in-law; "maradalu")
- D. Ramanaidu as Collector (cameo)

== Soundtrack ==
Soundtrack was composed by Koti. and Released on Aditya Music.

Bendu Apparao RMP

Soundtrack album by Koti
- Released: 14 September 2009
- Recorded: 2009
- Genre: Soundtrack
- Length: 16:41
- Label: Aditya Music
- Producer: Koti

No.	Title	Lyrics	Singer(s)	Length
1.	"Adire Adharama"	Vanamali	Tippu, Harini	4:01
2.	"Em Roopura Ori Nayana"	Chandrabose	Tippu, Harini	4:51
3.	"Nagadhi Naguni"	Ramajogayya Sastry	Mano, Chorus	3:53
4.	"Sukumari Chinnadi"	Chandrabose	Karthik, Nitya Santhoshini	3:56
Total length:				16:41

== Reception ==
Jeevi of Idlebrain.com rated the film 3 out of 5 and wrote, "On a whole, Allari Naresh comes up with another decent comedy flick after his last hit Blade Babji". Radhika Rajamani of Rediff.com rated the film 2 out of 5 stars and wrote, "Bendu Appa Rao is a laugh riot despite a routine storyline".
