= Satish Vegesna =

Indian film director and screenwriter

- Born: Tanuku, Andhra Pradesh, India
- Education: B.A
- Occupations: Director, screenwriter
- Years active: 1998–present

Satish Vegesna is an Indian film director and screenwriter who works in Telugu cinema. His film Shatamanam Bhavati received the National Film Award for Best Popular Film Providing Wholesome Entertainment and the state Nandi Awards for Best Direction, and Best Home Viewing Feature Film.

== Early life ==
Vegesna was born in Tanuku of West Godavari district, Andhra Pradesh. He completed his BA and worked as a composer in the news daily Eenadu for 7 years. He quit his job to become a writer.

== Career ==
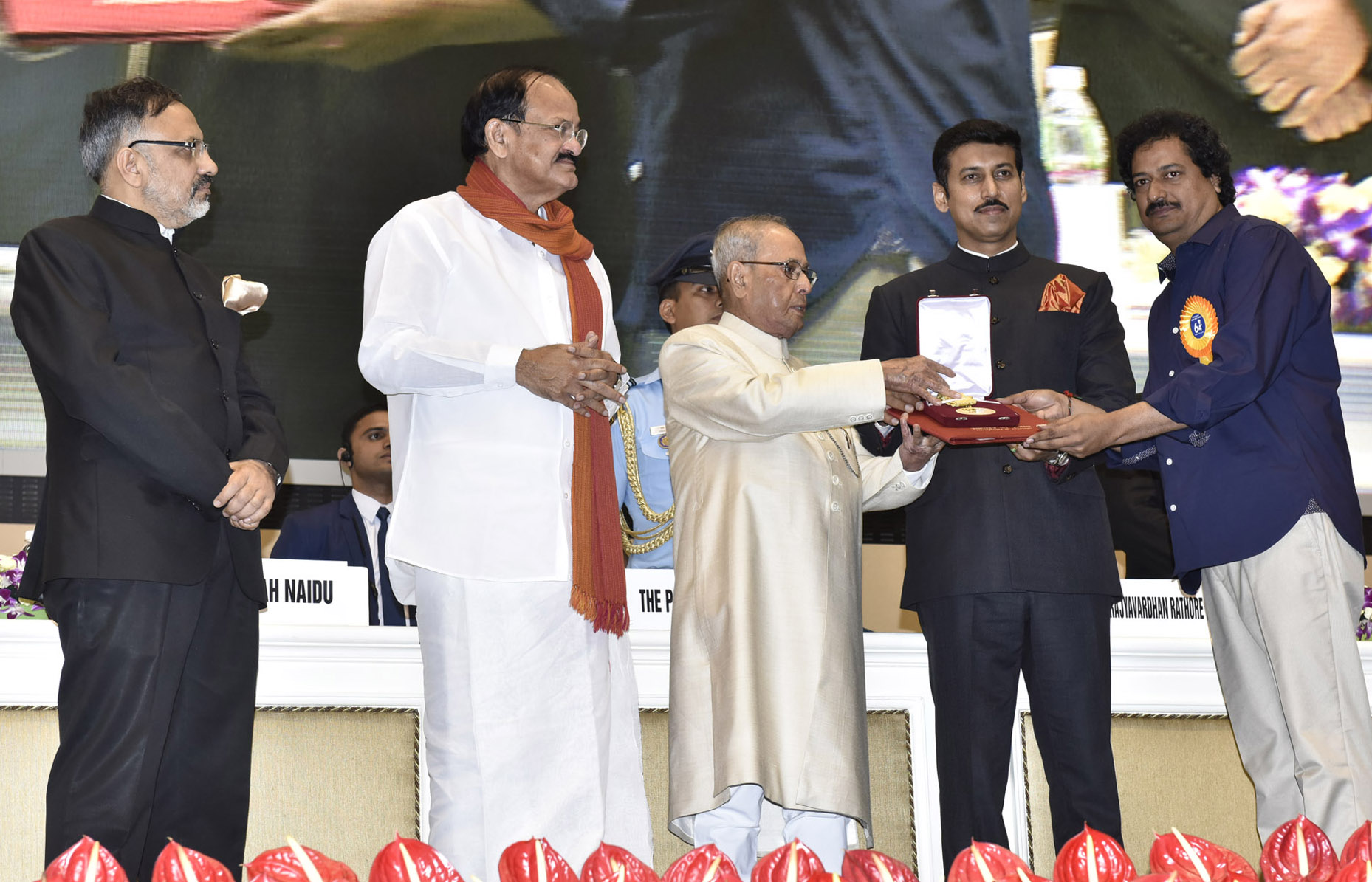
Vegesna (right) receiving award from President Pranab Mukherjee (middle) at the 64th National Film Awards, 2017

Vegesna initially worked as a writer and became a director. In 1999, he started working with director Muppalaneni Shiva for a few films like Speed Dancer and Priya O Priya. He worked with E. V. V. Satyanarayana for the film Thotti Gang. This along with Kabaddi Kabaddi gave him a break as a writer. Later he worked with Allari Naresh for several films.

Dongala Bandi was his first film as a director starring Allari Naresh. But this film did not do well at the box office. He worked for director Harish Shankar for the films Gabbar Singh, Ramayya Vastavayya, and Subrahmanyam for Sale. After that he approached producer Dil Raju with the story of Shatamanam Bhavati, which became a hit at the box office also garnering a National award and state Nandi award. The film received the National Film Award for Best Popular Film Providing Wholesome Entertainment for "in appreciation of providing a feeling of jubilation by respecting family values in an unexplored manner".

== Filmography ==
Year	Film	Director	Writer	Notes	Ref.
1998	Subhalekhalu	No	Dialogue		
2000	Maa Pelliki Randi	No	Dialogue		
2000	Hyderabad	No	Dialogue		
2001	Prema Sakshiga	No	Dialogue		
2002	Raghava	No	Dialogue		
2002	Nee Premakai	No	Story		
2002	Kanulu Moosina Nuvve	No	Dialogue		
2002	Yuva Rathna	No	Story, dialogue		
2002	Hai	No	Dialogue		
2002	Thotti Gang	No	Dialogue		
2003	Kabaddi Kabaddi	No	Dialogue		
2003	Satyam	No	Dialogue		
2003	Nenu Seetamahalakshmi	No	Dialogue		
2003	Nenu Pelliki Ready	No	Dialogue		
2004	Naa Autograph	No	Dialogue		
2004	Leela Mahal Center	No	Dialogue		
2005	Pandem	No	Story, dialogue		
2005	Nuvvante Naakishtam	No	Dialogue		
2005	That is Pandu	No	Dialogue		
2006	Kithakithalu	No	Dialogue		
2006	Rajababu	No	Dialogue		
2007	Athili Sattibabu LKG	No	Screenplay, dialogue		
2007	Pellaindi Kaani	No	Dialogue		
2008	Blade Babji	No	Story, dialogue		
2008	Dongala Bandi	Yes	Yes		
2008	Mangataayaru Tiffin Centre	No	Dialogue		
2009	Fitting Master	No	Dialogue		
2010	Burudi	No	Dialogues		
2011	Madatha Kaja	No	Screenplay, dialogue		
2012	Gabbar Singh	No	Screenplay		
2012	Ramadandu	Yes	Yes		
2012	Kulu Manali	Yes	Yes		
2013	Kevvu Keka	No	Story, dialogue		
2013	Ramayya Vasthavayya	No	Screenplay		
2015	Subramanyam for Sale	No	Screenplay		
2015	Paisalo Paramatma	No	Dialogue		
2017	Shatamanam Bhavati	Yes	Yes	National Film Award for Best Popular Film Providing Wholesome Entertainment; Nandi Award for Best Director	
2018	Srinivasa Kalyanam	Yes	Yes		
2020	Entha Manchivaadavuraa	Yes	Screenplay, dialogue		
2024	Mr. Bachchan	No	Screenplay		
2025	Sri Sri Sri Raja Vaaru	Yes	Yes		
