= Betting Bangaraju =

Betting Bangarraju
- Directed by: Sattibabu
- Produced by: Ramoji Rao
- Starring: Allari Naresh; Nidhi Oza
- Music by: Shekar Chandra
- Production company: Ushakiran Movies
- Release date: 9 April 2010
- Country: India
- Language: Telugu
- Budget: ₹3 crore
- Box office: est. ₹9 crore distributors' share

Betting Bangarraju is a 2010 Indian Telugu-language romantic comedy film produced by Ramoji Rao under Ushakiran Movies starring Allari Naresh and Nidhi Oza in the lead roles.

The film revolves around Naresh and his plans to make his love successful. Bangaraju bets on almost everything, it shows how he wins his love by eliminating possible suitors. It is based on the nuances of a chronic better, the hero. It was a commercial hit at the box office.

== Plot ==
Bangarraju is a carefree youth and a very lucky guy who is referred to as an idiot in his village, and who bets on almost everything and wins in the bet, whereas his father is a respectable person. One day, his friend visits him telling him that he loved and married a city girl but this was not the actual story. Raju, inspired by this, goes to the city and loves a girl. But the girl already has three other suitors. She invites all of them to her house and family for they are going to choose her suitor. The rest of the story is about how Raju eliminates the other suitors by betting with them cleverly and winning the girl.

== Cast ==
- Allari Naresh as Betting Bangarraju
- Nidhi Oza as Divya
- Kota Srinivasa Rao
- Krishna Bhagavaan
- Surekha Vani
- Shankar Melkote
- L. B. Sriram
- Amit Tiwari
- Hema
- Venu Yeldandi
- Shanoor Sana
- Jyothi
- Goparaju Vijay

== Soundtrack ==
All music is composed by Shekar Chandra

No.	Title	Singer(s)	Length
1.	"Kalaya Nizaamaa"	Deepu
2.	"Big B From Bhimavaram"	Ramky
3.	"Maa Inti Mahalakshmi"	Venugopal, Geetha Madhuri
4.	"Tassadiyya"	Ramky, Ravi Varma
5.	"Nelimegham"	Pranavi, Deepu

== Release ==
It was one of the top 10 movies in Telugu cinema in the year 2010. It has collected 10 crores gross. The movie received much critical appreciation for Allari Naresh for his performance.
