= Kabaddi Kabaddi (2003 film) =

- DVD Cover
- Directed by: Venky
- Written by: Satish Vegesna (dialogues)
- Screenplay by: Venky
- Story by: Venky
- Produced by: Valluripalli Ramesh Babu
- Starring: Jagapati Babu; Kalyani
- Cinematography: S. K. A. Bhupathi
- Edited by: Basva Paidireddy
- Music by: Chakri
- Production company: Maharshi Cinema
- Release date: 16 February 2003
- Running time: 131 minutes
- Country: India
- Language: Telugu

Kabaddi Kabaddi is a 2003 Indian Telugu-language sports romantic comedy film produced by Valluripalli Ramesh Babu for Maharshi Cinema, and directed by Venky. Starring Jagapati Babu, Kalyani and music composed by Chakri.

== Cast ==
- Jagapati Babu as Rambabu
- Kalyani as Kaveri
- Brahmanandam as Bachi Baba
- Tanikella Bharani as Veerabhadrayah
- M. S. Narayana as Kabaddi Coach Appa Rao
- Jaya Prakash Reddy as Head Constable
- Kondavalasa as Krishna Rao
- Krishna Bhagawan as Bosu
- Raghu Babu as Seenu
- Suman Setty as Sastry
- Surya as Nagendra
- Chinna as Madman
- Poti Prasad as Villager
- Sarika Ramachandra Rao as Anjineelu
- Gundu Sudarshan as Priest
- Gautam Raju as Villager
- Jeeva as President Rama Rao
- Jenny as Kabaddi Refinery Chinna Rao
- Rajitha as Rani
- Preeti Nigam as Nagendra's wife

== Soundtrack ==
Kabadi Kabadi

Film score by Chakri
- Released: 2003
- Genre: Soundtrack
- Length: 27:35
- Label: Aditya Music
- Producer: Chakri

Chakri chronology
Avunu Valliddaru Ista Paddaru (2002)	Kabadi Kabadi (2003)	Donga Ramudu & Party (2003)

The music for the film was composed by Chakri and released by Aditya Music Company.

No.	Title	Lyrics	Singer(s)	Length
1.	"Goruvanka Godarivanka"	Bhaskarabhatla	Ravi Varma, Kousalya	4:48
2.	"Jabilli Bugganugilli"	Bhaskarabhatla	Hariharan, Kousalya	5:04
3.	"Kokila Kokila"	Bhaskarabhatla	Chakri, Kousalya	3:57
4.	"Prema Prema"	Sandeep, Kousalya	Sai Sriharsha	5:06
5.	"Kabadi Kabadi"	Kaluva Krishna Sai	Ravi Varma, Chakri	4:31
6.	"Kokila Kokila -II"	Bhaskarabhatla	Chakri, Kousalya	3:55
Total length:				27:35

== Reception ==
A critic from Sify said that "The most difficult aspect of a comedy film is that it should make the audience laugh. Kabaddi Kabaddi is meant to be a laugh riot and to a certain extent the director has succeeded in achieving that".
