= Pellaindi Kaani =

- DVD Cover
- Directed by: E. V. V. Satyanarayana
- Screenplay by: E. V. V. Satyanarayana
- Produced by: M. Narasimha Rao
- Starring: Allari Naresh; Kamalinee Mukerji; Bhanupriya
- Cinematography: D. Prasad Babu
- Edited by: Gautham Raju
- Music by: Kamalakar; Jayashree
- Distributed by: Raasi Movies
- Release date: 12 October 2007
- Country: India
- Language: Telugu

Pellaindi Kaani..! (transl. Married but...) is a 2007 Indian Telugu-language romantic comedy film directed by E. V. V. Satyanarayana and starring his son Allari Naresh, Kamalinee Mukerji and Bhanupriya with Krishna Bhagavaan, Kota Srinivasa Rao and Sunil in supporting roles. The films shows the relationship between a husband, wife and his mother.

== Plot ==
Pellaindi Kani portrays what happens between two bumps to the head of the protagonist Attchi Babu (Allari Naresh). With the first bump, at the age of 10, he loses his mental balance. Twelve years later he regains his sanity with another bump to his head.

Attchi Babu is the son of a rich widow (Bhanupriya) and is heir to a vast property. His mother loves him dearly. In the hope that he would become normal, she arranges his marriage with Gayathri (Kamalinee Mukherjee), daughter of the village headmaster (Chandra Mohan) who is in need of money to get his heart operated. Bhanupriya knows that no sensible girl would ever wish to marry an abnormal person. Yet for the love of her son she arranges for the marriage. Gayathri agrees to the marriage to save her father. She also hopes that someday Attchi Babu would become normal.

But Bhanupriya's brothers (Kota Srinivasa Rao and Krishna Bhagavaan) are working overtime to finish off both the mother and son to acquire their property. Will they succeed? Will Attchi Babu father a child? Pellaindi Kani has the answers.

== Cast ==
- Allari Naresh as Atchi Babu
- Kamalinee Mukherjee as Gayathri
- Bhanupriya as Rajeshwari
- Krishna Bhagavaan as Rajeshwari's brother
- Kota Srinivasa Rao as Rajeshwari's brother
- Sunil as Subramaniam / Subbu
- Harish Kumar as Sivaji
- Chandra Mohan as Gayathri's father
- Pragathi as Gayathri's mother
- Sana as Rajeshwari's sister-in-law
- Sudeepa Pinky as Rajeshwari's niece
- Mallikarjuna Rao as Accordion player
- Kondavalasa Lakshmana Rao as Drums player
- Gundu Sudarshan as Pandit
- Abhinayashree as a sex worker (cameo appearance)

== Production ==
The film was still in production as of September 2007.

== Soundtrack ==
The soundtrack was composed by Kamalkar and Jayashree. The audio launch was held on 24 September 2007.

Track listing
No.	Title	Lyrics	Singer(s)	Length
1.	"Nuvvu Nenugaa"	Varikuppala Yadagiri	Hariharan, Sunitha Upadrashta	4:16
2.	"Bavalu Bavalu"	Jayasurya Bompem	Vijayalakshmi, Raghuram, Veenas	5:03
3.	"Amma Laali Jo"	Veturi Sundararama Murthy	K. S. Chithra, R. K. Kamalakara Rao, Gopika Poornima	5:06
4.	"Jeedi Pappu Payasam"	Jayasurya Bompem	Jassie Gift, Suchitra	4:00
5.	"Aa Devude"	Veturi Sundararama Murthy	Madhu Balakrishnan, K. S. Chithra, Nihal	4:53
Total length:				23:18

== Reception ==
A critic from Rediff.com wrote that "Comedy is EVV's forte and he depends heavily on it to push the film forward. He packs in a punch with one-liners that are quite delightful, but as is his wont, he is unable to do away with the double entendres here and there".
