= Amma Cheppindi =

- Theatrical release poster
- Directed by: Gangaraju Gunnam
- Written by: Gangaraju Gunnam
- Produced by: Urmila Gunnam; Korrapati Sai
- Starring: Sharwanand; Shriya Reddy; Suhasini
- Cinematography: Sandeep Gunnam
- Edited by: Mohan Rama Rao
- Music by: M. M. Keeravani
- Release date: 28 July 2006
- Country: India
- Language: Telugu

Amma Cheppindi (transl. Mother told me) is a 2006 Telugu-language drama film written and direction by Gangaraju Gunnam. Sharwanand, Shriya Reddy, and Suhasini play the lead roles while Suman, Nagendra Babu, and Pavan Malhotra play supporting roles. M. M. Keeravani provided the music and background score for the film, cinematography was by Gangaraju's son, Sandeep, and editing by Mohan Rama Rao. The film's producer Gangaraju Gunnam won Nandi Special Jury Award.

== Plot ==
Bose's father is India's foremost rocket scientist and the director of Bharat Rocket Centre. Bose's younger brother is a class 12 topper in the country. Bose is 21 years old but has managed to fail his third standard for the umpteenth time. He is a happy child trapped in a man's body, his mother's pet, and the township's bête noire. Everyone in Bharat Rocket Centre either despises him or takes advantage of him, yet he plays insouciantly with his friends from third standard. When Bose is removed from school, his mother Saraswati wangles him a job in the Rocket Centre canteen to keep him occupied. Bharat Rocket Centre plans to celebrate the coming Independence Day in style as they are starting a Space Tech School with the brightest students in the country and with the top scientists as guest lecturers. However, the ISI plans to wipe out the august gathering that day. Some ISI agents befriend Bose, and he acts as an unwary courier carrying their RDX into the center. On Independence Day, all the scientists and students are in place, and so is the massive bomb planted by ISI. The doors are locked by a colluding security man, and the bomb activates. As time runs out, so do the options to save the trapped people. Finally, Saraswati is forced to take a decision no mother would, and Bose makes a sacrifice no son would: to become an unparalleled hero. After bomb blast Razia reveal he had known their action although love towards his own people he sacrifice himself. All of them was HEARTBROKEN, including Razia.

== Cast ==
- Sharwanand as Bose
- Suhasini as Saraswati, Bose's mother
- Shriya Reddy as Razia
- Pavan Malhotra as Bose's father
- Nagendra Babu as Terrorist
- Suman as Major K. L. Chowdary, the Principal
- Gangadhar Pandey as Travel Agent
- Krishna Bhagavan as Sattiraju, the cook
- L. B. Sriram as Saloon Keeper Tirupathi
- Devadarshini as Saraswati's neighbor
- Tanikella Bharani as Paparao
- Narsing Yadav as Goon
- Sivannarayana Naripeddi as Police officer and friend of Bose
- Gundu Hanumantha Rao

== Production ==
=== Pre-production ===
Gangaraju's previous films Little Soldiers (1996), Aithe (2003) and Anukokunda Oka Roju (2005) could not garner much at the box-office. In an interview, he said that he "could not connect with larger section of audiences." However, he expressed optimism that the viewership has increased for his last two movies. While he produced the last two, his last directorial venture was Little Soldiers back in the nineties. This hiatus, according to him, was neither optional nor intentional but, it was either due to lack of funds or lack of offers to direct films. It was only after his friend who began a production house, Just Yellow Productions, he ventured into production.

For Amma Cheppindi, the short story Flowers for Algernon that Gangaraju read a long time ago, provided him with the necessary ideas. However, he said that the film's final screenplay is not similar to that story. The script for the film was written six years before filmmaking, even before his last two production ventures were conceptualized. Despite this, the script remained the same.

=== Casting ===
Urmila Gunnam, the director's wife and producer for the film was responsible for selecting the cast for the film.

Gangaraju and Urmila noticed Sharwanand in Vennela (2005) and called him to discuss about this project. After a screen test, he was selected for the role of Bose. After Sharwanand was selected for the role, director Gangaraju said that he could not imagine any one else performing that role.

About Suhasini, who plays the mother of the protagonist, Gangaraju was initially hesitant about her being too young and slim to play a mother's role. However, he appreciated her performance and termed it as one of the most natural ones seen in recent times. Gangaraju said that Sriya Reddy's performance was one of the rarest performances by a Telugu actress in a while.

== Music ==
Amma Cheppindi songs were composed by M. M. Keeravani.

- "Vasthava Natho" - Shreya Ghoshal, Harish Raghavendra
- "EvremyinaAnnni vinaku" - Bombay Jayashri
- "The Largest Ciruclated" - Harish Raghavendhra, L.B. Sriram
- "Tirupathi Pechina Meesam" - Keeravani
- "Matlatho Swatale" - Pranavi
- "Amma Ga Korukuntunna" - Pranavi
- "Dot Dash" - Keeravani
- "Janaganamana" - Harish Raghavendra

== Reviews ==
Reviews were generally positive. One review said that Sharwanand "should feel lucky to get this role in the beginning of his career that has given him scope to come up with an award winning performance." Though the review wrote well about the music, dialogues, story and depiction of emotional scenes, the editing, screenplay and direction was hoped to have been better. Another review said that though the pace of the film was slow in the beginning, the performance by the cast and the technical departments was good.
