= Fitting Master =

- Directed by: E. V. V. Satyanarayana
- Written by: E. V. V. Satyanarayana
- Dialogues by: Tadi Balaram; Satish Vegesna
- Produced by: E. V. V. Satyanarayana
- Starring: Allari Naresh; Madalsa Sharma; Sayaji Shinde
- Music by: Chinna
- Release date: 14 January 2009
- Country: India
- Language: Telugu

Fitting Master is a 2009 Indian Telugu-language action film written and directed by E. V. V. Satyanarayana, featuring his son Allari Naresh in the title role of Fitting Master, along with Madalsa Sharma, Sayaji Shinde, Chandra Mohan, Ali, Srinivasa Reddy and Amit Tiwari in the lead roles. The film was released on 14 January 2009, and got mixed reviews from critics. The film was able to do well and was a hit at the box office.

== Synopsis ==
Sampath aka Fitting Master is a gym trainer, who tries to avoid Meghna, a girl who falls in love with him, after she is rescued by him. She wants to marry him, but he avoids her, saying he won't be able to keep her happy, after which she calls her brother from United States to India to make Sampath ready for Marriage. On the day of his arrival, he gets murdered. After a policeman starts investigating, Meghna begins to doubt Sampath, and she finds out that he had killed her brother, after which Sampath reveals her brother's truth. Meghna's brother and 2 of his friends had embarrassed Sampath's sister by posting dirty videos of her in the internet. One of the friends had pretended to fall in love with her and she ran away with him due to which her mother dies of a heart attack. After 2 weeks, the groom's friend blackmails Sampath's sister with her first night video. She relents and 3 friends rape her one after another. When she cries out this to her husband, he tells her that his friends film them. Because of this the girl commits suicide. When Sampath's and the girl's father come to know of it he too commits suicide. Sampath had gotten angry on this and decided to take revenge. He had made Meghna purposefully fall in love with him and it was he who got his friend to tell Meghna to call her brother. When her brother revealed that he and his parents were actually against the marriage, Sampath overpowers the guy and guns him down. He now kills the other 2 as well. In the end, when Meghna again tries to convince him of her love, he refuses saying that her parents will never forgive their son's killer and that he cannot stay in the house with that guilt. He tells her to listen to her parents and they are her well wishers. As she begins to cry at losing him, he goes out of the house with tears in his eyes.

== Cast ==
- Allari Naresh as Sampath aka Fitting Master
- Madalsa Sharma as Meghna
- Chandra Mohan as Sampath's father
- Sudha as Sampath's mother
- Sayaji Shinde as Police officer
- Amit Tiwari as Meghna's brother
- Pavitra Lokesh as Meghna's mother
- Ali as Bose
- Rao Ramesh as Varun
- Srinivasa Reddy
- Khayyum as Sampath's friend
- Chalapathi Rao as Bose's assistant
- Jaya Prakash Reddy as Bose's assistant
- Surekha Vani as Journalist
- Krishna Bhagavan as News reporter
- Prudhviraj as Police Officer
- Ravi Prakash as Pandu
- Saira Banu as Sandhya (Sampath's sister)
- Nirupam Paritala as Giri, Sandhya's husband

== Soundtrack ==
The music was composed by Chinna and was released by Aditya Music.

Fitting Master

Soundtrack album by Chinna
- Released: 2009
- Recorded: 2009
- Genre: Soundtrack
- Length: 21:07
- Label: Aditya Music
- Producer: Chinna

All lyrics are written by Vanamali.

Track list
No.	Title	Singer(s)	Length
1.	"Thappu Sodhara"	Rahul Nambiar	3:27
2.	"Yedo Mayalagundi"	K. S. Chithra, Karthik	4:38
3.	"Padhaharu"	Rita Thyagarajan	3:51
4.	"Vennellana"	Kalpana, Karthik	4:55
5.	"Kanne Vesthe Choosindistha"	Suchitra	4:16
Total length:			21:07

== Reception ==
Radhika Rajamani of Rediff.com rated it 2/5 and wrote, "Unlike a typical E V V film, the humour is negligible. He also laces the film with a message". A critic from Bangalore Mirror wrote, "Naresh is known for his comedy timing. But, in this movie, he hardly makes you laugh".
