= Blade Babji =

- Film poster
- Directed by: Devi Prasad
- Written by: Devi Prasad; Satish Vegesna
- Produced by: Muthyala Satya Kumar
- Starring: Allari Naresh; Sayali Bhagat
- Cinematography: A. Raja
- Edited by: Nandamuri Hari
- Music by: Koti
- Production company: Satya Movies
- Release date: 24 October 2008
- Running time: 150 minutes
- Country: India
- Language: Telugu
- Box office: ₹7 crore distributors' share

Blade Babji is a 2008 Indian Telugu-language comedy film directed by Devi Prasad who co-wrote the film with Satish Vegesna. The film stars Allari Naresh, Sayali Bhagat, and Ruthika. Venu Madhav, Srinivasa Reddy, Krishna Bhagavan, Dharmavarapu, Kondavalasa, Jaya Prakash Reddy, Brahmanandam, Shankar Melkote, and Khayyum played supporting roles. The music is composed by Koti. The film is inspired by the 1999 American film Blue Streak.

Released on 24 October 2008, the film was successful at the box office. It was remade in Tamil as Kasethan Kadavulada (2011) and Kannada as Kiladi Kitty (2012).

== Plot ==
Blade Babji is a pickpocket from Rajahmundry who takes up the mission of earning ₹4 crore to rescue the slum dwellers in his area from a builder. He and his gang decide to go to Vizag and rob a bank. They implement their plan and bury the loot in a building under construction. In celebration, they get drunk and doze off on a boat that leaves to the Andaman Islands which forces them to go away for a month. When they return, they find that a police control room is at the spot where they have hidden their loot. In order to retrieve the loot, Babji takes the position of newly joined officer Krishna Manohar by kidnapping him. Babji quickly impresses the other officers with his skills. He also accepts the police commissioner's proposal to marry his daughter Archana. Buchi Babu, the commissioner's first son-in-law knows that Babji is a fraud as he was cheated before but stays quiet as Babji blackmails him.

After a lot of struggle, Babji manages to find the buried spot and their gang tries to retrieve the loot in the disguise of a bomb squad. However, to their astonishment, they find it missing. The loot is found by Dharma Rao, a mason, who watched Babji's gang bury it on the night of the robbery. He stuffs all the money in a mattress but his wife unknowingly sells it off as scrap to a street seller. Dharma files a complaint to the police that his mattress is lost and is ready to pay a handsome amount to find it. Babji realizes that it's Dharma who took the loot. Babji traces that the mattress is bought by a local don named Banda Badri. Simham, a fellow police officer overhears this and gets hold of the mattress before others. He transfers all the money into a suitcase and throws away the mattress. Constable Edukondalu, who also has a similar suitcase, unknowingly takes the suitcase with the loot. The suitcase is later exchanged into the hands of Babji's gang who also have a similar suitcase. They open it and are thrilled to find the loot.

Meanwhile, Krishna Manohar escapes and tells the police that Babji is a fraud. Babji and his gang drive off with the money. Simham, Badri, Buchi Babu, and Dharma Rao all follow the gang on the highway. A terrorist group puts RDX in a similar suitcase and Buchi Babu steals it mistaking it for the loot. When all of them fight for the suitcase with RDX, it blasts, and in the scuffle, Babji's gang escapes with the money.

When Babji is handing over the money to the builder, Badri interrupts claiming the loot as his own, and the police arrive to arrest them. Babji, however, cleverly convinces Badri and the police to give up the loot for a good cause. The builder who doesn't want to be the only bad person, agrees to give up the land to the slum dwellers for free. Everyone is elated and the loot is returned to the police for recovery.

== Cast ==
- Allari Naresh as Blade Babji
- Sayali Bhagat as Archana
- Venu Madhav as Balu
- Ruthika as Rani
- Brahmanandam as Buchi babu
- Harsha Vardhan as JP
- Khayyum as Vara Prasad "VP"
- Srinivasa Reddy as SI Krishna Manohar
- Dharmavarapu Subramanyam as CI Simham
- Shankar Melkote as Police commissioner
- Jaya Prakash Reddy as Banda Badri
- L. B. Sriram as Constable Edukondalu
- Krishna Bhagavaan as Taapi DharmaRao
- Rajitha as Taapi DharmaRao's Wife
- Jeeva
- Hema
- Kondavalasa Lakshmana Rao as Street seller
- Apoorva as Edukondalu's wife
- Kausha Rach as an item number (guest appearance)

== Soundtrack ==
The soundtrack is composed by Koti. It is released on Aditya Music.

No.	Title	Singer(s)	Length
1.	"Pillore Pilla"	Tennis Kamal, Sri Krishna, Krishna Chaitanya
2.	"Mokkajonna"	Deepu, Pravani
3.	"Rajamundry"	Karunya, Sai Shivani
4.	"Sarejaha"	S. P. Balasubrahmanyam
5.	"Du Du Du"	Deepu, Suneetha

== Reception ==
Sify gave the film 3/5 and wrote: "The director has come out with a good and interesting subject and he has done a very good job with the narration." They opined that the strength of the film lied in its "impressive" screenplay. Idlebrain.com also rated the film 3/5 and called it a "decent comedy."

123Telugu.com gave the film 3.5 out of 5 and termed it a "Comedy of Errors." They appreciated the performances of Allari Naresh and the supporting cast.
