= Sharwanand =

Indian film actor (born 1984)

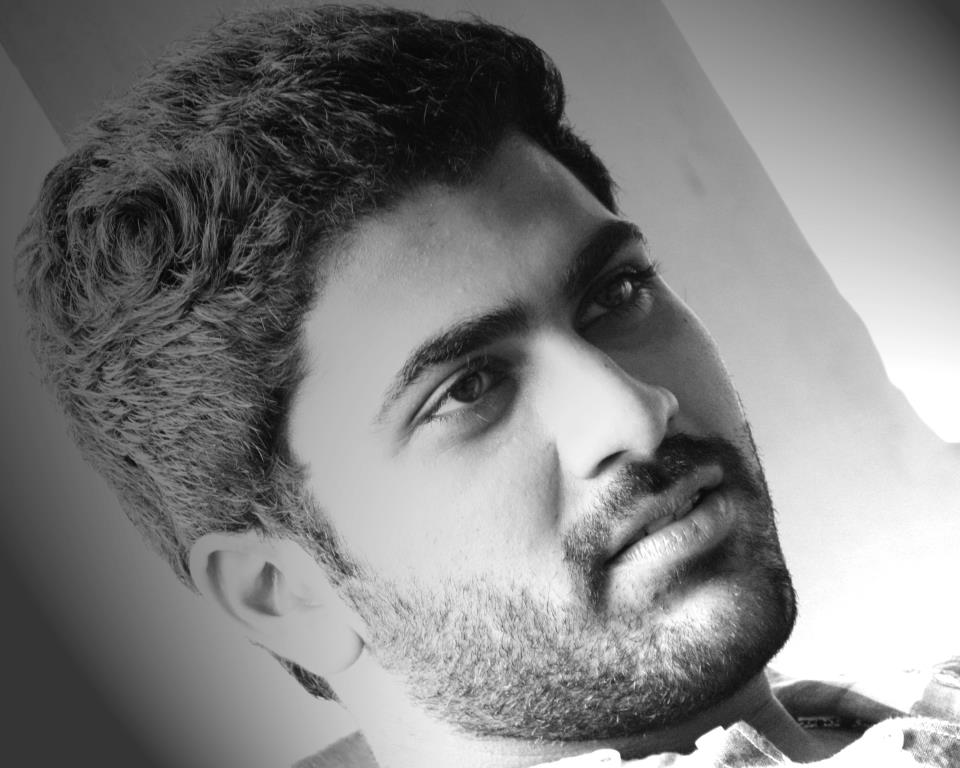
- Sharwanand in 2012
- Born: Myneni Sharwanand; 6 March 1984 (age 42); Vijayawada, Andhra Pradesh
- Education: Wesley College
- Occupations: Actor; producer
- Years active: 2003–present
- Spouse: Rakshitha Reddy (m. 2023)
- Children: 1

Myneni Sharwanand (born 6 March 1984), known mononymously as Sharwanand, is an Indian actor and producer who primarily works in Telugu films alongside a few Tamil films. He made his acting debut in 2004 with the film Aidho Tareekhu. He is the grandson of Myneni Hariprasada Rao.

For Engeyum Eppothum (2011), he received SIIMA Award for Best Male Debut - Tamil, he has also won Nandi Special Jury Award for Malli Malli Idi Rani Roju (2015).

Sharwanand initially acted in films including Prasthanam, Engaeyum Eppothum, Run Raja Run and Malli Malli Idi Rani Roju. He then starred in notable films including Express Raja, Shathamanam Bhavati and Mahanubhavudu.

== Early and personal life ==
Sharwanand Myneni was born in Vijayawada, Andhra Pradesh to Myneni Vasundhara Devi and Myneni Ratnagiri Vara Prasad Rao, and brought up in Hyderabad, Telangana. He did his schooling from The Hyderabad Public School, Begumpet, where he was classmates with Ram Charan and Rana Daggubati. He then completed his B.Com from Wesley Degree College, Secunderabad. During his college days, Sharwanand was selected as "The Hindu's Best New Face". At the age of 17, Sharwanand attended Kishore Namit Kapoor Acting Institute in Mumbai.

Sharwanand hails from a closely knit business family. Ram Pothineni, who is also an actor, is his cousin. His family originally hails from Edlalanka near Avanigadda in Diviseema.

Sharwanand got engaged to Rakshita Reddy, a US-based techie and daughter of the Andhra Pradesh High Court lawyer, Pasunoor Madhusudhan Reddy, on 26 January 2023. They married on 3 June 2023 in The Leela Palace, in Jaipur.

== Career ==
=== Early career and supporting roles (2003–2005) ===
Sharwanand first came to media attention in a Thums Up advertisement with Chiranjeevi. He later made his acting debut in Telugu with Aidho Tareeku in 2003 and proceeded to share screen space with Chiranjeevi in Shankar Dada M.B.B.S. and with Venkatesh in Sankranthi and Lakshmi in supporting roles.

=== Critical acclaim and forays into Tamil cinema (2005–2013) ===
Sharwanand rose to stardom with Vennela (2005) and Amma Cheppindi (2006), the latter of which earned him critical acclaim. He then acted in films like Gamyam (2008) and Andari Bandhuvaya (2010) which, despite being sleeper hits, earned Nandi Awards. Prasthanam was a cult classic. These films won him accolades.

Sharwanand then forayed into Tamil cinema with films such as Kadhalna Summa Illai (2009) before making his full fledged debut through Naalai Namadhe (2009). However, it was only through Engeyum Eppodhum (2011) that he gained recognition. In 2012, Sharwanand made his debut as a producer with his film, Ko Ante Koti, which was produced under Sarvaa Arts.

=== Commercial breakthrough and success (2014–present) ===
Sharwanand got his commercial breakthrough with the film, Run Raja Run, which was one of the blockbusters of the year 2014. This film, produced by UV Creations, was the second venture after their first blockbuster film, Mirchi. Sharwanand's portrayal of the lead, Raja, won him accolades. Sharwanand new look in the film with bright and colourful outfits is an added boost for his character's portrayal. Sharwanand's next film was Malli Malli Idi Rani Roju, with Nithya Menen, directed by Kranthi Madhav, which received positive applause from critics and ran as a decent movie. Sharwanand's following film was Express Raja, which was a hit at the box office.

Cheran's Tamil directorial venture JK Enum Nanbanin Vaazhkai, which was also released in Telugu in 2016 with Nithya Menen was below average at the box office.

Sharwanand's movie Sathamanam Bhavati collected almost 50 crores, produced by Dil Raju and directed by Satish Vegesna.

Sharwanand released his 25th film titled Radha, which was produced by the noted producer B. V. S. N. Prasad under his production banner SVCC cinema, but to mixed reviews. Sharwanand then starred in Mahanubhavudu, which released on 29 September 2017, directed by Maruthi and gained critical and commercial success.

Sharwanand's last movie was released on 7 February 2020, titled as Jaanu. It was directed by C. Prem Kumar which is a remake of his own Tamil film '96.

After that, he starred in Maha Samudram, with Siddharth, which was directed by Ajay Bhupathi of RX100 fame. It was produced by Anil Sunkara. However, it released to negative reviews and turned out to be a huge flop. He then starred in the science fiction time travel bilingual, Oke Oka Jeevitham, with Amala Akkineni, Ritu Varma, Vennela Kishore, and Priyadarshi Pullikonda. It was directed by Shree Karthick and produced by Dream Warrior Pictures. It released to generally positive reviews; after series of flops, it was a decent hit for him.

A political thriller directed by Krishna Chaitanya and bankrolled by People Media Factory, was launched with Sharwanand, Raashii Khanna, and Priyamani. However, due to undisclosed reasons, the film never started shooting and was eventually shelved. Sithara Entertainments decided to bankroll the film and launched it with Vishwak Sen and Anjali as Gangs of Godavari (2024). People Media Factory instead backed and launched a romantic drama with Sriram Adittya and Sharwanand, Manamey (2024), set in London. Upon release, it received mixed reviews from both the audience and critics, alike. However, it emerged as a minimal commercial success.

He also announced the birth of his daughter, Leela Devi Myneni, on the same day.

His next release after Manamey was Nari Nari Naduma Murari, which released on Sankranthi 2026, to generally positive reviews. His next theatrical outing titled Bhogi directed by Sampath Nandi is set to release on 28th Aug.

== Filmography ==
Key
†	Denotes films that have not yet been released

Note: All films are in Telugu unless noted otherwise

=== As actor ===
Year	Title	Role	Notes	Ref.
2004	Aidho Tareekhu	Sharwanand		
2004	Gowri	Krishna		
2004	Shankar Dada M.B.B.S.	Vijay		
2004	Yuvasena	Aravind		
2005	Sankranthi	Vamsi		
2005	Vennela	Ritesh		
2006	Lakshmi	Lakshmi Narayana's step-brother		
2006	Amma Cheppindi	Bose		
2006	Veedhi	Surya		
2007	Classmates	Murali		
2008	Gamyam	Abhiram	partially remade in Tamil as Kadhalna Summa Illai	
2009	Naalai Namadhe	Raju	Tamil film	
2009	Raju Maharaju	Kalyan		
2010	Andari Banduvaya	Nandu	Also playback singer for "Jama Chattuki Jamakayalu"	
2010	Prasthanam	Mitra		
2011	Engeyum Eppodhum	Gautham	Tamil film; dubbed in Telugu as Journey Won—SIIMA Award for Best Male Debut – Tamil	
2012	Nuvva Nena	Anand		
2012	Ko Antey Koti	Vamsi	Also producer	
2013	Satya 2	Satya		
2014	Run Raja Run	Raja Harishchandra Prasad	Nominated– Filmfare Award for Best Actor - Telugu	
2015	Malli Malli Idi Rani Roju	Raja Ram	Won– Nandi Special Jury Award	
2015	JK Enum Nanbanin Vaazhkai	Jayakumar "JK"	Tamil film; partially reshot in Telugu as Rajadhi Raja	
2016	Express Raja	Raja		
2017	Sathamanam Bhavati	Raju		
2017	Radha	SI Radha Krishna	25th Film	
2017	Mahanubhavudu	Anand		
2018	Padi Padi Leche Manasu	Surya		
2019	Ranarangam	Deva		
2020	Jaanu	K. Ramachandra "Ram"		
2021	Sreekaram	Karthik		
2021	Maha Samudram	Arjun		
2022	Aadavallu Meeku Johaarlu	Chiranjeevi "Chiru"		
2022	Oke Oka Jeevitham	Adhi alias "Kutlu"	Telugu-Tamil bilingual film	
2022	Kanam	Adhi alias "Kutlu"	Telugu-Tamil bilingual film	
2024	Manamey	Balisetti Vikram		
2026	Nari Nari Naduma Murari	Potlakaya Gautham		
2026	Biker	Vikas Narayan		

=== As producer ===
Year	Film	Role	Notes
2012	Ko Antey Koti	Vamsi	Sarvaa Arts Production

=== Voice actor ===
Year	Title	Actor	Ref.
2009	Katha	Adith Arun	

== Awards and nominations ==
Year	Award	Category	Film	Result	Ref.
2012	1st South Indian International Movie Awards	Best Male Debut - Tamil	Engaeyum Eppothum	Won	
2015	62nd Filmfare Awards South	Best Actor – Telugu	Run Raja Run	Nominated	
2015	Nandi Awards	Nandi Special Jury Award	Malli Malli Idi Rani Roju	Won	

== See also ==
- List of Telugu actors
