= Deewana Mastana =

- Movie Poster
- Directed by: David Dhawan
- Written by: Anees Bazmee; Prayag Raj
- Produced by: Ketan Desai
- Starring: Govinda; Anil Kapoor; Juhi Chawla; Johnny Lever; Anupam Kher; Saeed Jaffrey; Himani Shivpuri
- Cinematography: Rajan Kinagi
- Edited by: A. Muthu
- Music by: Laxmikant–Pyarelal
- Distributed by: M.K.D. Films Combine
- Release date: 10 October 1997
- Running time: 160 minutes
- Country: India
- Language: Hindi
- Budget: ₹7 crore
- Box office: ₹24.33 crore

Deewana Mastana is a 1997 Indian Hindi-language romantic comedy film directed by David Dhawan. The film stars Govinda, Anil Kapoor, and Juhi Chawla in pivotal roles. Johnny Lever, Anupam Kher, Reema Lagoo, Shakti Kapoor, Saeed Jaffrey, Kader Khan, and Himani Shivpuri have supporting roles, while Salman Khan makes a special appearance. This film was dedicated to Manmohan Desai. Johnny Lever received the Filmfare award for Best Comedian for his performance on this film. The film was a success upon its release. The film was remade in Telugu as Nuvva Nena in 2012.

== Plot ==
Raja is a small-time crook who sells railway tickets on the black market at Amirpur Station. Tired of his job he looks for new ways to make a quick buck. One day, along with his friend Ghafoor and a police inspector, he robs Rs 2.5 million from the railway treasury. Later, Raja and Gafoor bump off the inspector and run away with the loot to Mumbai.

At the Mumbai airport, Raja spots Neha Sharma and falls in love at first sight with her. Incidentally, they land up at the same hotel where Raja and Gafoor find out that she is a psychiatrist. Raja assumes the name Raj Kumar and tries to befriend her by lying that he has just returned from America and that his driver Gafoor is suffering from a mental disorder where he regards any beautiful girl as his bhabhi. However, Gafoor cautions Raja not to hurry and be patient in matters of love.

The trouble begins when Bunnu, the son of a wealthy businessman, is sent to Neha for treatment. He has multiple phobias and is terrified of fire, heights, running, and water and is coached by Neha to deal with his issues using "Baby steps". Soon, he too falls for Neha and discovers he has a rival in Raja. Neha has to leave for Ooty with her father to attend her uncle's wedding. She does not leave behind a forwarding address. Both Raja and Bunnu impersonate policemen and intimidate her secretary into revealing where she is. Neha is thrilled to see them in Ooty, but is drawn closer to the ill Bunnu rather than Raja.

Things take an ugly turn when Gafoor tries to kill Bunnu, who escapes. Bunnu contacts a contract killer Pappu Pager to bump off Raja. However, that plan fails. Armed with a gold ring and garland, Neha calls Bunnu and Raja to court, ostensibly with the purpose of marriage. Both are surprised to see the other there. Eventually they find out that Neha is actually marrying Prem (Salman Khan) and Raja and Bunnu end up being witnesses to her marriage.

== Cast ==
- Govinda as Bunnu / Police Commissioner Tawde
- Anil Kapoor as Raj Kumar / Raja / Inspector Bansi Rao
- Juhi Chawla as Dr. Neha Sharma
- Johnny Lever as Gafoor Ali, Raja's friend
- Anupam Kher as Brijbhan "Birju" Rastogi, Bunnu's father
- Reema Lagoo as Subhadra Rastogi, Bunnu's mother
- Saeed Jaffrey as Nandkishore Kapoor, Neha's father
- Upasna Singh as Archana Kapoor, Neha's paternal aunt
- Himani Shivpuri as Latika Sharma, Raja's mother
- Avtar Gill as Inspector Dharmesh Mhatre
- Shiva Rindani as Goon in Pub
- Guddi Maruti as Suzie
- Shashi Kiran as Bus Driver
- Pratibha Sinha as Tina
- Satish Kaushik as Pappu Pager
- Shakti Kapoor as Somendar Kapoor, Neha's paternal uncle
- Kader Khan as Marriage Registrar
- Salman Khan as Prem Kumar (cameo appearance)
- Raveena Tandon in a cameo appearance
- David Dhawan as himself
- Ram Sethi as man asking for discount for train tickets (uncredited)

== Soundtrack ==
Deewana Mastana

Soundtrack album by Laxmikant–Pyarelal
- Released: 10 October 1997
- Genre: Hindi Film Soundtrack
- Label: Venus Music
- Producer: Laxmikant–Pyarelal

All the songs were written by Anand Bakshi.

#	Title	Singer(s)
1	"Yeh Gaya Woh Gaya"	Vinod Rathod, Alka Yagnik
2	"Hungama Ho Gaya"	Sonu Nigam; Poornima
3	"Tere Bina Dil Lagta Nahin"	Udit Narayan; Vinod Rathod; Alka Yagnik
4	"Dil Chaahe Kisi Se"	Alka Yagnik
5	"Head Ya Tail"	Udit Narayan; Vinod Rathod; Kavita Krishnamoorthy
6	"O Mummy Mummy"	Udit Narayan

== Reception ==
Syed Firdas Ashraf of Rediff.com opined that "Overall, the film is no different from the earlier masala mixtures ground together by David Dhawan and Govinda". Anupama Chopra of India Today wrote, "You can almost hear the director thinking - "How do I make the audience laugh next?" The appallingly mediocre music, picturised in done-to-death Switzerland locations, doesn't help much either. Still, after a summer of half-baked patriotism and simpering romantic drivel, a film with no pretensions comes as a relief. And Govinda, as always, is an absolute treat."

== Award and nominations ==
- Filmfare Best Comedian - Johnny Lever
- Star Screen Award Special Jury Award - Govinda
- Nominated – Filmfare Best Actor Award - Govinda
- Nominated – Star Screen Award for Best Actor - Govinda
- Nominated – Zee Cine Award for Best Actor in a Comic Role - Govinda
