= Nenu (film) =

- Directed by: E. Sathibabu
- Written by: Selvaraghavan
- Based on: Kaadhal Kondein (Tamil) by Selvaraghavan
- Produced by: Mullapudi Brahmanandam
- Starring: Allari Naresh; Veda; Abhishek
- Cinematography: C. Ramprasad
- Music by: Vidyasagar
- Distributed by: Sri Rajya Lakshmi Combines
- Release date: 15 April 2004
- Country: India
- Language: Telugu

Nenu (transl. Me) is a 2004 Indian Telugu-language romantic psychological thriller film released on 15 April 2004 starring Allari Naresh, Veda Archana, and Abhishek. This film was directed by E. Sathibabu and produced by Mullapudi Brahmanandam. It's a remake of Tamil blockbuster movie Kaadhal Kondein, which starred Dhanush and Sonia Agarwal in lead roles. The film was a flop at the box office but received good critical acclaim, mainly for Naresh's performance as a psychotic lover.

== Plot ==
Vinod, who has grown up under the care of a church father, is an introvert but a genius. He is forcibly sent to a college in Vizag by his father, but is a complete misfit in class. Though shunned by the rest of his class, Divya becomes his friend and he gradually warms up to her. His feelings soon turn into love but he realizes that Divya considers him as only a friend. However, he is unwilling to let her go. Meanwhile, Vinod learns that Divya is in love with another classmate, Aadi.

Divya's father is enraged on learning about her love. He locks her up at home and prevents her from contacting anyone. Vinod meets her on the pretext of getting some used clothes for himself. Pitied by Vinod's demeanour, her father allows him in. Vinod uses this opportunity and escapes with Divya. He convinces her that she will meet Aadi in the jungle.

Vinod has set up a secret place in that jungle for executing his plan of wooing Divya. He makes her stay with him, while convincing her by talking about the impending arrival of Aadi. On one such day, he reveals his miserable past, when he was made to work for paid labour after being orphaned at an early age. He revolts against the oppression one day against the illegal child labour at the orphanage. Promptly, he is beaten black and blue for his audacity. Moreover, he also loses his girlfriend to rapists in that place, who also kill her. He manages to escape from them and seeks refuge with a church father.

Divya is very touched by his past. Incidentally, the police and Aadi arrive at the place. While Vinod is away to get some food, they try to make Divya understand that Vinod is a psychopath. Yet Divya scoffs at their claim, citing his gentlemanly behaviour over the days she was alone with him. Vinod, learning that the police have arrived at the scene, begins to indulge in violence. He opens fire, killing a police constable. Forcing them out of their hideout, he manages to evade the police Inspector and Aadi and successfully brings Divya back to their original place of stay.

Divya soon identifies the wolf in the sheep's clothing. Vinod pleads with her, telling her that all he wanted in his life was her presence. But Divya considers him a friend and states her inability to accept him as her life partner. Meanwhile, Aadi regains consciousness and attacks Vinod and rescues his girlfriend. A violent fight ensues, where Vinod defies his puny self and treats Aadi with disdain. The fight culminates with Vinod, Aadi and Divya teetering on the edge of a cliff.

While Divya clutches a tree bark tightly, Vinod and Aadi slip out and barely manage to hold either of her hands. Divya is forced to choose between her boyfriend and her friend. Aadi's pleas notwithstanding, Divya doesn't have the heart to kill Vinod. Finally, Vinod decides to sacrifice himself and lets go of Divya's hand, falling to his death.

== Cast ==
- Allari Naresh as Vinod
- Veda as Divya
- Abhishek as Aadi Narayana
- Paruchuri Venkateswara Rao as Venkatachalam, Vinod's Father
- Chandra Mohan as Chandram
- CVL Narasimha Rao as College Lecturer
- Brahmanandam as Padmasri
- Kota Srinivasa Rao as College
- Shankar Melkote as College Principal
- Chalapathi Rao as DSP Prabhakaran, Divya's father
- Janaki Sabesh as Annapurna, Divya's mother
- Suhasini Maniratnam as Snehalatha, Vinod's mother
- Banerjee as Sub-inspector
- Jenny as Aadi's father
- Rajiv Kanakala as Seenu
- Chitram Basha as Aadi's friend

== Soundtrack ==
Nenu

Soundtrack album by Vidyasagar
- Released: 12 March 2004
- Recorded: 2004
- Studio: Varsha Vallaki Studios
- Genre: Soundtrack
- Length: 30:26
- Language: Telugu
- Producer: Vidyasagar

Vidyasagar chronology
Varnajalam (2004)	Nenu (2004)	Ghilli (2004)

The film's music was composed by Vidyasagar.

The audio of this film was released in a function arranged at Padmalaya with Venkatesh as the chief guest. Other guests were M Shyam Prasad Reddy, KS Rama Rao, KC Sekhara Babu, Arjuna Raju, EVV Satyanarayana, Paruchuri Venkateswara Rao and Sirivennela. Chalapati Rao anchored this event. Surya Music has bought the audio rights. Venkatesh released the audio and gave the first cassette to hero Naresh and heroine Veda. The audio received positive response.

Track-List
No.	Title	Lyrics	Singer(s)	Length
1.	"Endhuku Endhuku"	Sirivennela Seetharama Sastry	Karthik	4:55
2.	"Naakanti Paapa"	Veturi	Srivardhini	5:09
3.	"Panendu Dhaati"	Bhuvana Chandra	Tippu	5:10
4.	"Choosthu Choostune"	Sirivennela Seetharama Sastry	Karthik	5:07
5.	"Devathala Ninnu Chustunna"	Veturi	Harish Raghavendra	5:00
6.	"Dikkulne Daatindi"	Sirivennela Seetharama Sastry	Karthik	5:05
Total length:				30:26
