= Shankar Melkote =

Indian actor

- Born: 14 September 1938 (age 88); Hyderabad, Hyderabad State (now in Telangana, India)
- Occupations: Actor, Comedian, CEO
- Spouse: Rama Melkote

Shankar Melkote is an Indian comedian, supporting actor who appears in Telugu films and CEO of a marketing company in Hyderabad. He started his film career with Jandhyala's Srivariki Premalekha and went on to appear in 180 films. He is one of the speakers and writers at the Hyderabad Literary Festival. Melkote received the 17th Yudhvir Memorial Award in 2008 for outstanding contribution. He is the father-in-law of M.V.Sridhar, well noted Hyderabad ranji player and Former BCCI General Manager.

== Filmography ==
=== Telugu ===
- Srivariki Premalekha (1984)
- Karu Diddina Kapuram (1986)
- Premayanam (1988)
- Paila Pachessu (1989)
- Ashwini (1991)
- Srimaan Brahmachari (1992)
- Mechanic Mavayya (1999)
- Nuvve Kavali (2000)
- Anandam (2001)
- Akasa Veedhilo (2001)
- Nuvvu Naaku Nachav (2001)
- Ishtam (2001)
- Santosham (2002)
- Manmadhudu (2002)
- Oka Raju Oka Rani (2003)
- Donga Ramudu and Party (2003)
- Oka Radha Iddaru Krishnula Pelli (2003)
- Nenu (2004)
- Dost (2004)
- Anand (2004)
- Anandamanandamaye (2004)
- Balu ABCDEFG (2005)
- Modati Cinema (2005)
- Party (2006)
- Gopi – Goda Meeda Pilli (2006)
- Desamuduru (2007)
- Aadavari Matalaku Arthale Verule (2007)
- Veduka (2007)
- Allare Allari (2007)
- Bhookailas (2007)
- Bahumati (2007)
- Lakshyam (2007)
- Athidhi (2007)
- Anasuya (2007)
- Yogi (2007)
- Swagatam (2008)
- John Appa Rao 40 Plus (2008)
- Black & White (2008)
- Blade Babji (2008)
- Dongala Bandi (2008)
- Deepavali (2008)
- Malli Malli (2009)
- Punnami Naagu (2009)
- Current (2009)
- Bumper Offer (2009)
- Sambho Siva Sambho (2010)
- Sneha Geetham (2010)
- Broker (2010)
- Pappu (2010)
- Udatha Udatha Ooch (2010)
- Happy Happy Ga (2010)
- Gaganam (2011)
- Teen Maar (2011)
- Dookudu (2011)
- Pilla Zamindar (2011)
- Vara Prasad And Potti Prasad (2011)
- Shaitan (2011)
- Dhoni (2012)
- Endhukante Premanta (2012)
- Sudigadu (2012)
- Vennela 1½ (2012)
- Love Cycle (2013)
- Baadshah (2013)
- Athadu Aame O Scooter (2013)
- Bunny n Cherry (2013)
- Manam (2014)
- Power (2014)
- Karthikeya (2014)
- Noothi Lo Kappalu (2015)
- O Manasa (2015)
- Where Is Vidya Balan (2015)
- Mantra 2 (2015)
- Cinema Choopistha Mava (2015)
- Akhil (2015)
- Kerintha (2015)
- Supreme (2016)
- Manamantha (2016)
- Head Constable Venkatramaiah (2017)
- Hyderabad Love Story (2018)
- Aravinda Sametha Veera Raghava (2018)
- Silly Fellows (2018)
- Zombie Reddy (2021)
- FCUK: Father Chitti Umaa Kaarthik (2021)

=== Kannada ===
- Anthu Inthu Preethi Banthu (2008)
- Nannavanu (2010)
- Ninnindale (2014)

=== Tamil ===
- Payanam (2011)
- Dhoni (2012)
- Virattu (2014)

=== Hindi ===
- Thoda Tum Badlo Thoda Hum (2004)

=== TV Serials ===
- Amrutham
- Radha Madhu
