= Kondavalasa Lakshmana Rao =

Indian actor

Kondavalasa Lakshman Rao
- Born: 10 August 1946; Srikakulam, Madras Presidency, British India
- Died: 2 November 2015 (aged 69); Hyderabad, Telangana, India
- Years active: 1979; 2000–2015

Kondavalasa Lakshmana Rao (10 August 1946 – 2 November 2015), popularly known as Kondavalasa, was an Indian actor and comedian who worked in Telugu cinema and Telugu theatre.

== Background ==
Kondavalasa Lakshmana Rao was born on 10 August 1946 in Srikakulam. He was an employee at Visakhapatnam Port Trust.

Before appearing in films, Kondavalasa was a stage actor, having given more than 1000 stage performances. Director Vamsy gave him an opportunity in his film Avunu Valliddaru Ista Paddaru. His famous dialogue Aithe okay (trsl. "Then it's okay") from the film Avunu Valliddaru Ista Paddaru increased his popularity. He went on to appear in over 65 Telugu films.

== Death ==
Kondavalasa died on 2 November 2015. He was being treated at NIMS, Hyderabad following his illness.

It was reported that the comedian had been suffering from complications in the ear for the previous few days and the infection had spread to the brain, which led to his death.

== Filmography ==
Year	Film	Role	Ref.
1979	Maa Bhoomi		
2000	Pelli Kani Pellam Avutundi		
2002	Avunu Valliddaru Ista Paddaru!	Pottiraju	
2002	Dhanalakshmi I Love You		
2003	Evare Athagadu		
2003	Kabaddi Kabaddi	Krishna Rao	
2003	Ottesi Cheputunna		
2003	Nijam		
2003	Donga Ramudu and Party		
2003	Inspector		
2003	Nenu Pelliki Ready		
2003	Srirama Chandrulu		
2003	Nenu Seetamahalakshmi		
2003	Maa Alludu Very Good	Vishnu Mani	
2003	Satyam		
2004	Pallakilo Pellikoothuru		
2004	Donga Dongadi		
2004	Anandamanandamaye		
2004	Sorry Naaku Pellaindi		
2004	Xtra		
2004	Mr & Mrs Sailaja Krishnamurthy		
2004	Sathruvvu		
2004	Aaptudu		
2004	Suryam		
2005	Dhana 51		
2005	Evadi Gola Vaadidhi		
2005	Pandem		
2005	Dhairyam		
2005	Radha Gopalam		
2005	Sravanamasam		
2005	Veerabhadra		
2005	Andarivaadu		
2005	Jagapati		
2005	Kanchanamala Cable TV		
2005	Nuvvante Naakishtam		
2005	Please Naaku Pellaindi		
2005	123 from Amalapuram		
2005	Seenugadu Chiranjeevi Fan		
2005	Mahanandi		
2006	Rajababu		
2006	Chukkallo Chandrudu		
2006	Sri Krishna 2006		
2006	Hanumanthu		
2006	Veedhi		
2006	Sundaraaniki Tondarekkuva		
2006	Naayudamma		
2006	Andala Ramudu		
2006	Photo		
2006	Boss		
2006	Sainikudu		
2006	Rakhi		
2007	Madhumasam		
2007	Athili Sattibabu LKG		
2007	Gundamma Gaari Manavadu		
2007	Lakshmi Kalyanam		
2007	Allare Allari		
2007	Pagale Vennela		
2008	Deepavali	Pillai	
2008	Swagatam		
2008	Sundarakanda		
2008	Nee Sukhame Ne Koruthunna		
2008	Rainbow		
2008	Kshudra		
2008	Siddu from Sikakulam		
2008	Blade Babji		
2008	Kuberulu		
2008	Dongala Bandi		
2008	Veedu Mamoolodu Kadu		
2009	Pistha		
2009	Current		
2009	Gopi Gopika Godavari		
2009	Bendu Apparao RMP	Postman	
2010	Adhurs		
2010	Buridi		
2010	Varudu		
2010	Saradaga Inkonchem Sepu		
2010	Kathi Kantha Rao		
2012	Ramadandu		
2012	Sudigadu		
2012	Devaraya		
2013	1000 Abaddalu		
2014	Naa Rakumarudu		
2014	Ala Ela		
2014	Chandamama Kathalu		
2014	Sri Vasavi Kanyaka Parameswari Charitra		
2014	Laddu Babu		
2014	Saheba Subramanyam		
2014	O Manishi Katha		
2015	Gaddam Gang		
2015	James Bond		
