= M. S. Narayana filmography =

M. S. Narayana (1947–2015) was an Indian actor who appeared in Telugu films.

== As actor ==
=== Telugu films ===
List of Telugu film acting credits
Year	Title	Role	Notes	Ref.
1994	M. Dharmaraju M.A.			
1994	Punya Bhoomi Naa Desam			
1995	Pedarayudu	Acharya		
1995	Lingababu Love Story	C. I. Bhajagovindam		
1995	Orey Rickshaw			
1996	Ooha	Manager		
1996	Adirindi Guru			
1996	Ladies Doctor			
1996	Hello Neeku Naaku Pellanta			
1996	Akkada Ammayi Ikkada Abbayi			
1996	Sarada Bullodu			
1996	Akka! Bagunnava?			
1997	Chilakkottudu			
1997	Korukunna Priyudu			
1997	Osi Naa Maradala			
1997	Maa Nanaku Pelli			
1997	Rukmini			
1997	Priya O Priya			
1997	Aaro Pranam			
1997	Maa Nannaku Pelli	Shravani's father		
1998	Pandaga			
1998	Raayudu			
1998	Chandralekha	Bank Manager		
1998	Padutha Theeyaga			
1998	Pavitra Prema			
1998	Sri Ramulayya			
1998	Choodalani Vundi			
1998	O Panaipothundi Babu			
1998	Suprabhatam			
1998	Srimathi Vellostha			
1998	Yuvarathna Rana			
1998	Maavidaakulu	Car Thief		
1998	Subhavartha			
1998	Pape Naa Pranam	Drunkard		
1999	Sneham Kosam	Annavaram		
1999	Samarasimha Reddy			
1999	Swapnalokam			
1999	Yamajathakudu	Chitragupta		
1999	Swayamvaram			
1999	Bharata Ratna			
1999	Raja Kumarudu	Policeman		
1999	Preminche Manasu			
1999	Seenu	Barber		
1999	Anaganaga Oka Ammai			
1999	Ravoyi Chandamama			
1999	Vichitram	Rampandu		
1999	Panchadara Chilaka			
1999	Neeli Meghalu			
1999	Alludugaaru Vachcharu	Ateesu		
1999	Pilla Nachindi	Lingam (Driver)		
1999	Bobbili Vamsam			
1999	Little Hearts			
1999	Ramasakkanodu			
2000	Balaram	Head Constable		
2000	Postman			
2000	Vamsi	Ankineedu's assistant		
2000	Kodanda Ramudu			
2000	Kalisundam Raa	Lawyer Lingam		
2000	Manoharam	Watchman		
2000	Chala Bagundi			
2000	Sivanna			
2000	Yuvaraju			
2000	Badri	Chandra Mouli (CM).		
2000	Ravanna	Sarpam (Sarpanch) Samara Pulla Reddy		
2000	Kauravudu			
2000	Ninne Premistha			
2000	9 Nelalu			
2000	Sakutumba Saparivaara Sametam			
2000	Manasu Paddanu Kaani			
2000	Azad			
2000	Jayam Manadera			
2000	Nuvve Kavali	M. S. Lecturer		
2000	Chiru Navvutho			
2000	Sardukupodaam Randi	Singaraju Lingaraju		
2000	Pelli Sambandham			
2000	Oke Maata			
2000	Tirumala Tirupati Venkatesa			
2000	Durga			
2001	Devi Putrudu	Perayya		
2001	Maa Aavida Meeda Ottu Mee Aavida Chala Manchidi			
2001	Murari			
2001	Budget Padmanabham	Padmanabham's colleague		
2001	Deevinchandi			
2001	Ammayi Kosam			
2001	Ninnu Choodalani			
2001	Bava Nachadu			
2001	Family Circus			
2001	Adhipathi			
2001	Nuvvu Nenu	College Principal		
2001	Akasa Veedhilo			
2001	Nuvvu Naaku Nachav	Chanti		
2001	Itlu Sravani Subramanyam	Uda Narayana		
2001	Student No.1	Lecturer		
2001	Anandam	House Owner		
2001	Daddy	Priya's Father		
2001	Repallelo Radha			
2001	Ammaye Navvithe			
2001	Veedekkadi Mogudandi			
2001	Tholi Valapu	Insurance Narayana		
2001	Subbu			
2001	Hanuman Junction	Abbulu		
2001	6 Teens	College lecturer		
2001	Jaabili			
2001	Raghava			
2001	Lady Bachelors			
2001	Narahari			
2001	Naalo Unna Prema	Tabelu Vamana Rao		
2001	Inspector Vikram			
2001	Simharasi	Loose Basavayya		
2001	Darling Darling	Swamy		
2001	Apparao Ki Oka Nela Thappindi			
2001	Bhadrachalam			
2001	Thank You Subba Rao			
2001	Subhakaryam			
2001	Cheppukondi Chudam			
2001	Sivudu			
2001	Ammo Bomma	Principal		
2001	Challenge (New)			
2001	Chirujallu			
2002	Nuvvu Leka Nenu Lenu	Doctor		
2002	Seema Simham			
2002	Parasuram			
2002	Neetho Cheppalani	Balu's grandfather		
2002	Aadi	Narayana		
2002	Friends	House Owner		
2002	Allari Ramudu			
2002	Premaku Swagatam			
2002	Raghava			
2002	Nee Premakai			
2002	Vasu	Moola Shankar Rao (ads producer)		
2002	Mounamelanoyi			
2002	Tappu Chesi Pappu Koodu			
2002	Adrustam			
2002	Sreeram	Neighbour		
2002	Indra	Ganga Ram (Taxi Driver)		
2002	Avunu Valliddaru Ista Paddaru!			
2002	Idiot	College Lecturer		
2002	Okato Number Kurraadu			
2002	Chennakesava Reddy			
2002	Nuvve Nuvve	Conistable		
2002	Yuva Rathna			
2002	2 Much			
2002	Thotti Gang	One-half of Bongu Brothers		
2002	Pilisthe Palukutha			
2002	Ninu Choodaka Nenundalenu			
2002	Trinetram			
2002	Indra			
2002	Bharatasimha Reddy			
2002	Chance			
2002	Manamiddaram			
2002	Sontham	Lecturer Bhogeswara Rao		
2002	Vachina Vaadu Suryudu	Krishna Rao		
2002	Neekosame Neenu			
2002	Police Sisters			
2002	Police No. 1			
2002	Sandade Sandadi			
2002	Kanulu Moosinaa Neevaye			
2003	Naaga			
2003	Pellam Oorelithe	(MLA) Goswami		
2003	Fools			
2003	Utsaham			
2003	Kabaddi Kabaddi	Kabaddi Coach Apparao		
2003	Gangotri			
2003	Ammulu			
2003	Dil	Pulla Rao (Principal)		
2003	Amma Nanna O Tamila Ammayi	Broker		
2003	Johnny			
2003	Ottesi Cheputunna	Reddy Naidu (ReNa Anna)		
2003	Appudappudu			
2003	Missamma			
2003	Ninne Ishtapaddanu			
2003	Oka Raju Oka Rani			
2003	Kalyana Ramudu	Pahilwan		
2003	Praanam			
2003	Donga Ramudu and Party			
2003	Sambaram			
2003	Dongodu			
2003	Seetayya			
2003	Janaki Weds Sriram			
2003	Tagore	Tagore's uncle		
2003	Shivamani			
2003	Nenu Seetamahalakshmi			
2003	Neeke Manasichaanu	Vaddi Narayana		
2003	Nenu Pelliki Ready	Gopi's grandfather		
2003	Sriramachandrulu			
2003	Okkatavudam			
2003	Oka Radha Iddaru Krishnula Pelli			
2003	Aadanthe Ado Type			
2003	Maa Bapu Bommaku Pellanta			
2003	Veede			
2003	Premante			
2003	Avuna			
2004	Lakshmi Narasimha			
2004	Jai Balaji			
2004	Anji			
2004	Athade Oka Sainyam	Swathi's father		
2004	Anandamanandamaye	Gavarraju		
2004	Enjoy			
2004	Abhi	Daivansa Sharma		
2004	Nenunnanu			
2004	Kushi Kushiga	Thirumalai		
2004	Andaru Dongale			
2004	Koduku			
2004	Valliddaru Okkate			
2004	Intlo Srimathi Veedhilo Kumari			
2004	143	Dr.Kotilingam, (Ph.D, Psychologist)		
2004	Sathruvu			
2004	Shankar Dada M.B.B.S.	Dr. Chidambaram M.B.B.S F.R.C.S		
2004	Apparao Driving School			
2004	Chanti			
2004	Swarabhishekam			
2004	Sakhiya			
2004	Leela Mahal Center			
2004	Preminchukunnam Pelliki Randi			
2004	Pallakilo Pellikoothuru			
2004	Okatavudam			
2004	Anjali I Love You			
2004	Aithe Enti	Vastu Expert, Daivansa Sharma		
2004	Andhrawala	Dhanraj's assistant		
2004	Malliswari	Krishnaveni's husband		
2004	Varsham	Priest		
2005	Youth			
2005	Andarivaadu	Thatharao		
2005	Balu	House Owner		
2005	Konchem Touchlo Vunte Cheputanu			
2005	786 Khaidi Premakatha			
2005	Pandem			
2005	Dhairyam			
2005	Relax	Tehalca Subba Rao		
2005	Sravanamasam			
2005	Chakram			
2005	Soggadu			
2005	Andagadu	Satyam		
2005	Bunny	Principal Daiva Sahayam		
2005	Hungama	Balu		
2005	Jagapati			
2005	Oka Oorilo			
2005	Nireekshana			
2005	Naa Oopiri	Prasad		
2005	Kanchanamala Cable TV	Aavu Master		
2005	Athadu	Tea Shop's costumer		
2005	Nuvvante Naakishtam			
2005	Moguds Pellams			
2005	Jai Chiranjeeva	Customs officer		
2005	Adirindayya Chandram	Manmadha Rao		
2005	Seenugadu Chiranjeevi Fan			
2005	Allari Bullodu			
2006	Devadasu			
2006	Sivakasi		Telugu version	
2006	Kokila			
2006	Happy	TC ( Railway Ticket Collector)		
2006	Bangaram			
2006	Oka V Chitram	Dr. Gasagasa Rao		
2006	Photo			
2006	Maa Iddari Madhya			
2006	Boss			
2006	Tata Birla Madhyalo Laila			
2006	Samanyudu	Narayana		
2006	Raraju			
2006	Chinnodu			
2006	Pellaina Kothalo			
2006	Khatarnak	Traffic Police Officer		
2006	Rakhi			
2006	Annavaram			
2006	Vijay IPS			
2006	Veedhi			
2006	Sarada Saradaga	Public / Blade Babji		
2006	Nee Navve Chalu			
2006	Pellaina Kothalo	Lakshmi's uncle		
2006	Bhagyalakshmi Bumper Draw			
2006	Kithakithalu	Mikkilineni Nagarjuna		
2006	Sarada Saradaga			
2007	Yogi			
2007	Pagale Vennela			
2007	Madhumasam			
2007	Athili Sattibabu LKG			
2007	Veduka			
2007	Operation Duryodhana			
2007	Dubai Seenu	Fire Star Salman Raj		
2007	Satyabhama	Padi Secondla Padmanabham		
2007	Allare Allari			
2007	Yamadonga			
2007	Hello Premistara			
2007	Chirutha	Charan's boss		
2007	Pellaindi Kaani			
2007	Viyyalavari Kayyalu			
2007	Seema Sastri	Vaikuntam		
2007	Maisamma IPS	Venkobu		
2007	Bangarukonda			
2007	Godava			
2007	Gajibiji			
2007	Bahumati			
2007	Anumanaspadam			
2007	State Rowdy			
2007	Operation Duryodhana			
2007	Bhajantrilu		Also Director	
2007	Navvule Navvulu			
2007	Raju Bhai			
2008	Krishna			
2008	Pourudu			
2008	Vaana			
2008	Swagatam			
2008	Mr. Girisham	K		
2008	Mr. Medhavi			
2008	Andamaina Manasulo			
2008	Idi Sangathi			
2008	Krishnarjuna			
2008	Gamyam			
2008	Bhadradri			
2008	Kalidasu			
2008	Bommana Brothers Chandana Sisters			
2008	Kantri	Thelupu Ramakrishna		
2008	Bujjigadu	Prabhas Raju		
2008	Adivishnu			
2008	Ready	Junior Shastry		
2008	Rainbow			
2008	Kathanayakudu	Dharmaraju's assistant		
2008	Siddu from Sikakulam	Rattayya		
2008	Homam	P.C. Sarkar		
2008	Souryam			
2008	Chintakayala Ravi	Ravi's Uncle		
2008	Andamaina Abaddam			
2008	Kuberulu			
2008	Dongala Bandi	Okka Magaadu		
2008	Neninthe	Co Director		
2008	King	Sravani's uncle		
2008	Mangatayaru Tiffin Centre			
2008	Junction			
2008	Nee Sukhame Ne Koruthunna			
2008	Somberi			
2008	Sawaal			
2008	Donga Sachinollu			
2008	Yuvatha			
2008	Premabhishekam	Drunkard		
2008	Victory			
2008	Veedu Mamoolodu Kadu	Chakri's uncle		
2009	Sasirekha Parinayam	A. Koti		
2009	Fitting Master			
2009	Manorama	Jeevan Reddy		
2009	Punnami Nagu	Kajal's uncle		
2009	Bangaru Babu	Nagaraju		
2009	Aa Okkadu			
2009	Flash News			
2009	Mental Krishna			
2009	Raju Maharaju			
2009	Anjani Putrudu			
2009	Oy!			
2009	Snehituda...	Linga Raju (Watchman)		
2009	Ninnu Kalisaka			
2009	Anjaneyulu	Prakash		
2009	Sankham			
2009	Rechipo			
2009	Bendu Apparao R.M.P			
2009	Bumper Offer			
2009	Aa Aaa Ee Eee: Athanu Aame Inthalo Eeme			
2009	Kurradu			
2009	Kasko			
2009	Saleem			
2009	Putrudu	Bhadram		
2009	Pistha	Watchman		
2009	18, 20 Love Story			
2009	Nachav Alludu	Tenali Ramakrishna's uncle		
2009	Mestri			
2009	Posani Gentleman			
2010	Maa Nanna Chiranjeevi			
2010	Adhurs	Bhasha Bhai		
2010	Namo Venkatesa	Astrologer Palasa		
2010	Seeta Ramula Kalyanam Lankalo	Principal Risk Rambo		
2010	Bindaas	Pakir		
2010	Tejam			
2010	Aakasa Ramanna	Dr. Ekalingam		
2010	Taj Mahal	M.S. Naidu, Hostel Warden		
2010	Mouna Ragam			
2010	Darling	Appala Naidu		
2010	Golimaar	Hotel Babai		
2010	Panchakshari	Poojary		
2010	Jhummandi Naadam			
2010	Sye Aata	McDowel Prasad		
2010	Happy Happy Ga	Pooja's uncle		
2010	Thakita Thakita			
2010	Saradaga Kasepu			
2010	Yemaindi Ee Vela			
2010	Aalasyam Amrutam			
2010	Manasara			
2010	Nagavalli			
2010	Gudu Gudu Gunjam	Rama Swamy		
2010	Aunty Uncle Nandagopal			
2010	Darling	Appalanaidu		
2010	Buridi	M. S. Narayana (Don)		
2010	Khaleja	Villager		
2010	Timmaraju			
2011	Katha Screenplay Darsakatvam Appalaraju	Gogineni Venkataramana Rao		
2011	Kudirithe Kappu Coffee			
2011	Aha Naa Pellanta!			
2011	Sakthi	Haridwar priest		
2011	Teen Maar			
2011	100% Love	College Professor		
2011	Badrinath	Chupke		
2011	180	Vidya's boss		
2011	Dhada			
2011	Kandireega			
2011	Mugguru			
2011	Dookudu	Bokka Venkateshwar Rao	Won—Nandi Award for Best Male Comedian; Won—Filmfare Award for Best Supporting Actor – Telugu; Won—CineMAA Awards – Best Actor (Jury)	
2011	Vankai Fry			
2011	Madatha Kaja			
2011	Oosaravelli	Niharika's house owner		
2011	Pilla Zamindar	Uddhandam		
2011	Veedu Theda			
2011	Solo			
2011	Bezawada	Veera Venkata Durga Prasad		
2011	Chattam			
2011	Graduate			
2011	Cricket Girls & Beer			
2011	Prema Kavali	Noothana Kumar		
2011	Raaj			
2011	Telugammayyi			
2012	Ramadandu			
2012	Ee Rojullo	Satti Raju		
2012	Racha	Raj's adoptive father		
2012	Daruvu	Chitragupta / Mr. Gupta		
2012	Tuneega Tuneega	James's friend		
2012	Julayi	Valmiki C. I.		
2012	Devudu Chesina Manushulu	Papayya		
2012	Srimannarayana	Priest		
2012	Rebel	Shastri		
2012	Cameraman Gangatho Rambabu	Rambabu's uncle		
2012	Denikaina Ready	Sampangi Sastry		
2012	Damarukam	Vankara Satyam		
2012	Routine Love Story			
2012	Devaraya			
2012	Yamaho Yama	Chitragupta		
2012	Sarocharu	Platinum Prasad		
2012	Agnatham			
2012	Em Babu Laddu Kavala			
2012	Sudigadu	Rambo		
2012	Ayyare			
2013	Sevakudu			
2013	Jagan Nirdoshi			
2013	Okkadine			
2013	Mr. Pellikoduku	Narayana		
2013	Baadshah	Revenge Nageswara Rao		
2013	Shadow	Dr. Donga Srinivasa Rao aka Psycho Srinu		
2013	Greeku Veerudu	Sundar		
2013	Sukumarudu			
2013	Tharangam Tharangam			
2013	Attarintiki Daredi	Balu		
2013	Bhai	Mansion Raju		
2013	Man of the Match			
2013	Masala	Narayana Rao		
2013	Venkatadri Express	Taxi driver		
2013	Chandee			
2013	Kevvu Keka	Subba Rao		
2013	Naayak	CBI Officer		
2013	Music Magic			
2013	Biskett			
2014	Pandavulu Pandavulu Tummeda	Mastan		
2014	Hum Tum			
2014	Naa Rakumarudu	Teacher		
2014	Race Gurram	Tea shop owner		
2014	Amrutham Chandamamalo			
2014	Manam	Father Francis		
2014	Ulavucharu Biriyani			
2014	Jump Jilani			
2014	Manasa Thulli Padake			
2014	Autonagar Surya			
2014	Premalo... ABC			
2014	Aagadu	Database Danayya		
2014	Govindudu Andarivadele	Bangari's friend		
2014	Rough			
2014	Poga			
2014	Saheba Subramanyam			
2014	Lovers	Church Father		
2014	Erra Bus			
2014	Yamaleela 2			
2015	Pataas	'Tsunami Star' Subhash	Posthumously released	
2015	Crazywala		Unreleased	
2015	Heroine		Posthumously released	
2015	Rey		Posthumously released	
2015	S/O Satyamurthy	Pallavi's paternal uncle	Posthumously released	
2015	Lion	Ramam	Posthumously released	
2015	Pandaga Chesko	Swathi's father	Posthumously released	
2015	Tippu		Posthumously released	
2015	Sher	Lungi Baba	Posthumously released	
2016	Shankara	Narayana	Posthumously released	
2017	Nenorakam		Posthumously released	
2021	Aaradugula Bullet		Posthumously released (final film role)	

=== Other language films ===
List of other language film acting credits
Year	Title	Role	Language	Notes
2006	Madrasi		Tamil	Uncredited appearance in the song "Adho Andha Paravai"
2008	Satya in Love	Muslim Auto Driver in Andhra Pradesh	Kannada	
2009	Yagna		Kannada	
2011	Nootrenbadhu	Vidya's boss	Tamil	
2011	Maharaja	Subbu	Tamil	

== As writer and director ==
Year	Title	Director	Writer	Notes	Ref.
1992	Alexander	No	Dialogues		
1992	Shivanaga	No	Story	Kannada film	
1993	Pekata Papa Rao	No	Story		
2004	Koduku	Yes	Yes		
2007	Bhajantrilu	Yes	Story		
