= List of Telugu films of 2008 =

This is a list of films produced by the Tollywood (Telugu language film industry) based in Hyderabad in the year 2008.

== List ==
Opening		Title	Director	Cast	Production house	Ref
J A N	2	Aapada Mokkulavaadu	Posani Krishna Murali	Nagendra Babu, Sai Kumar, Tanikella Bharani		
J A N	11	Krishna	V. V. Vinayak	Ravi Teja, Trisha Krishnan, Mukul Dev, Bramhanandam		
J A N	11	Okka Magadu	Y. V. S. Chowdary	Balakrishna Nandamuri, Nisha Kothari, Anushka		
J A N	13	Pourudu	Raj Aditya	Sumanth, Kajal Agarwal		
J A N	25	Swagatam	Dasaradh	Jagapati Babu, Anushka, Bhumika Chawla		
J A N	26	Mr. Medhavi	Neelakanta	Raja, Genelia D'Souza		
J A N	26	Highway	V. Manoj Kumar	Sai Kumar, Nataraj, Santosh Pavan, Rajeev Kanakala		
J A N	15	Vaana	M. S. Raju	Vinay Rai, Meera Chopra		
F E B	1	Krishnarjuna	P. Vasu	Vishnu Manchu, Nagarjuna Akkineni		
F E B	6	Homam	J. D. Chakravarthy	Jagapati Babu, J. D. Chakravarthy, Mamta Mohandas, Madhurima Tuli, Pradeep Rawat, Mahesh Manjrekar		
F E B	8	Vishaka Express	Mullapudi Vara	Allari Naresh, Rajiv Kanakala, Preeti Jhangiani, Sindhu Tolani		
F E B	8	Sundarakanda	Bapu	Charmee Kaur, Allari Naresh		
F E B	10	Black & White	Srikanth Vemulapalli	Rajeev Kanakala, Sindhu Tolani, Jackie Shroff, Surekha Vani		
F E B	13	Andamaina Manasulo	R. P. Patnaik	Rajiv, Remya Nambeesan, Archana Gupta		
F E B	14	Ontari	Ramana	Gopichand, Bhavana		
F E B	22	Idi Sangathi	Chandra Siddhartha	Tabu, Abbas, Sunil		
F E B	22	Nee Sukhame Ne Koruthunna	Giri Babu	Raja, Sneha		
F E B	28	Pelli Kani Prasad	Satyam Dwarapudi	Allari Naresh, Sridevi Vijaykumar, Sivaji		
F E B	29	Gamyam	Radhakrishna Jagarlamudi	Allari Naresh, Sharwanand, Kamalinee Mukherjee		
F E B	29	Mangathaayaru Tiffin Centre	Venky	Mumaith Khan, Ali, Shafi		
M A R	1	Premabandham	Agathiyan	Aakash, Sridevika, Vani, Vijay Kumar, Saranya, Aiswarya		
M A R	6	Nagaram	Srinivas C. C	Meka Srikanth, Jagapathi Babu, Kaveri Jha		
M A R	20	John Appa Rao 40 Plus	Kuchipudi Venkat	Krishna Bhagawan, Simran		
M A R	25	Buddha	Allani Sridhar	Sunil Sharma, Kausha Rach, Suman, Puneet Issar		
M A R	21	Aatadista	A.S. Ravi Kumar	Nithiin, Kajal Agarwal		
M A R	21	Abbo Aadavallu	T. N. Raju	Saila Katri, Vanita Reddy, Sruthi		
A P R	2	Jalsa	Trivikram Srinivas	Pawan Kalyan, Ileana D'Cruz, Mukesh Rishi		
A P R	11	Bhale Dongalu	K. Vijaya Bhaskar	Tarun, Ileana D'Cruz, Jagapati Babu		
A P R	11	Kalidasu	G. Ravicharan Reddy	Sushanth, Tamannaah Bhatia, Jayasudha		
A P R	18	Bhadradri	Mallikarjuna	Raghumudri Srihari, Raja Abel, Nikita Thukral, Gajala		
A P R	18	Michael Madana Kamaraju	Nidhi Prasad	Prabhu Deva, Charmy Kaur, Meka Srikanth, Sunil		
A P R	21	Bommana Brothers Chandana Sisters	Srinivasa Reddy	Allari Naresh, Krishna Bhagawan, Farzana		
A P R	25	Donga Sachinollu	Raja Vannemreddy	Krishna Bhagavan, Raghu Babu, Ali, Rambha, Brahmanandam		
M A Y	23	Bujjigadu	Puri Jagannadh	Prabhas, Sanjana, Trisha Krishnan		
M A Y	9	Kantri	Meher Ramesh	Jr. NTR, Hansika Motwani, Tanisha Mukherjee		
M A Y	15	Kshudra	Nagul	Priyanka, Ramya, Kondavalasa Lakshmana Rao, Jeeva		
M A Y	30	Pandurangadu	K. Raghavendra Rao	Balakrishna Nandamuri, Sneha, Tabu		
M A Y	1	Parugu	Bhaskar	Allu Arjun, Sheela, Prakash Raj		
M A Y	14	Premabhishekam	Vikram Gandhi	Venu Madhav, Ruthika, Priya Mohan		
J U N	27	Victory	Ravi C. Kumar	Nithiin, Mamta Mohandas, Sindhu Tolani		
J U N	19	Ready	Sreenu Vaitla	Ram, Genelia D'Souza, Bramhanandam		
J U N	28	Konchem Kothaga	Raju Rajendra Prasad	Venkat, Tulip Joshi, Ashish Vidyarthi, Johnny Lever, Banerjee		
J U N	6	Adhyakshaa	Marudhuri Raja	Raghu Babu, Brahmaji, Jeeva		
J U L	11	Brahmanandam Drama Company	E. Srikanth Nahatha	Sivaji, Ravi Krishna, Brahmanandam, Kamalinee Mukherjee		
J U L	11	Sangamam	Rasool Ellore	Sindhura Gadde, Rohit Khurana, Murali Mohan, Suhasini		
J U L	22	Gajibiji	K. Vasu	Ali, Farjana, Brahmanandam, Krishna Bhagawan		
J U L	17	Hare Ram	Harsha Vardhan	Kalyan Ram, Priyamani, Sindhu Tolani		
J U L	25	Maa Ayana Chanti Pilladu	Raja Vannem Reddy	Sivaji, Meera Jasmine		
J U L	25	Ullasamga Utsahamga	A. Karunakaran	Yasho Sagar, Sneha Ullal, Sunil		
A U G	1	Aalayam	Muthyala Subbaiah	Sivaji, Honey Rose		
A U G	1	Kathanayakudu	P. Vasu	Rajinikanth, Jagapati Babu		
A U G	14	Baladur	Udayasankar	Ravi Teja, Krishna, Anushka Shetty, Chandra Mohan, Pradeep Rawat		
A U G	14	Salute	A. Rajasekhar	Vishal, Upendra, Nayanthara		
A U G	14	Siddu from Sikakulam	Eashwar	Allari Naresh, Manjari Phadnis		
A U G	21	Adivishnu	Bharat Parepalli	Dasari Arunkumar, Sneha, Suman, Kota Srinivasa Rao		
S E P	5	Ankit, Pallavi & Friends	Hari Yelleti	Nikhil Siddharth, Naresh, Megha Burman, Venu		
S E P	5	Ashta Chamma	Mohan Krishna Indraganti	Nani, Swati Reddy		
S E P	5	Call Center	Kanmani	Vamsi Krishna, Luna		
S E P	25	Chintakayala Ravi	Yogie	Venkatesh, Anushka Shetty, Mamta Mohandas		
S E P	11	Gunde Jhallumandi	Madan	Uday Kiran, Aditi Sharma		
S E P	11	King	Sreenu Vaitla	Nagarjuna Akkineni, Trisha Krishnan		
S E P	19	Mallepuvvu	V. Samudra	Bhumika Chawla, Murali Krishna		
S E P	19	Raksha	Vamsikrishna Akella	Jagapathi Babu, Kalyani, Bramhanandam		
S E P	25	Souryam	J Siva Kumar	Gopichand, Anushka		
S E P	26	Friends Colony	Achana Srinivas	Anil kumar, Posani Krishna Murali, Poonam Singar, Sony Charista		
O C T	2	College Days to Marriage Days	Premchand	Sandeep, Madhavi Latha		
O C T	31	Gorintaku	V. R. Prathap	Dr. Rajasekhar, Meera Jasmine, Aarti Agarwal		
O C T	24	Hero	G. V. Sudhakar Naidu	Nithiin, Bhavana, Ramya Krishna		
O C T	9	Kousalya Supraja Rama	Surya Prasad	Meka Srikanth, Sivaji, Charmy Kaur, Gowri Munjal		
O C T	23	Keka	Teja	Raja, Anup Kumar, Ishana		
O C T	10	Kotha Bangaru Lokam	Srikanth Addala	Varun Sandesh, Shweta Prasad, Prakash Raj		
O C T	10	Nenu Meeku Telusa?	Ajay Sastry	Manoj Manchu, Sneha Ullal, Riya Sen		
O C T	9	Ninna Nedu Repu	Lakshmikanth Chenna	Ravi Krishna, Rekha Vedavyas, Tamannaah Bhatia		
O C T	2	Rainbow	V. N. Aditya	Rahul, Sonal Chauhan, Sindhu Menon		
N O V	14	Avakai Biryani	Anish Kuruvilla	Kamal Kamaraju		
N O V	7	Blade Babji	Devi Prasad	Allari Naresh, Sayali Bhagat, Krishna Bhagawan, Brahmanandam		
N O V	28	Deepavali	Haribabu	Venu Thottempudi, Megha Nair, Aarthi Agarwal		
N O V	28	Devarakonda Veeraiah	R. Narayana Murthy	R.Narayana Murthy, Sharafat		
N O V	28	Ek Police	Kodi Ramakrishna	Naga Babu		
N O V	7	Ekaloveyudu	RK	Uday Kiran, Kriti Ahuja, Babu Antony		
N O V	23	Indrajith	V. R. Prasad	Sai Kumar, Ramya Krishna, Sangeetha		
N O V	30	Kurkure	Junaid	Duvvasi Mohan, Bhuvaneshwari		
N O V	21	Sri Medaram Sammakka Sarakka Mahatyam	Vemuganti	Uday Babu, Prema		
N O V	22	Vinayakudu	Sai Kiran Adivi	Sonia Deepti, Chinni Jayaram Yadav		
D E C	5	Andamaina Abaddam	Raviraja Pinisetty	Raja, Kamna Jethmalani		
D E C	18	Chedugudu	P R Nagaraju	Jayanth, Shwetha, Sayaji Shinde		
D E C	12	City Life	Souda	Venu Madhav, Aziz, Koutilya, Sonu, Ameer, Moloni Patel		
D E C	26	Dhyeyam	Jayasimha Reddy	Sai Kiran, Karishma Kotak, Venu Madhav		
D E C	12	Dongala Bandi	Satish Vegesna	Allari Naresh, Tanya, Pooja Bharathi, Kovai Sarala, Venu Madhav		
D E C	12	Ek Police	Kodi Ramakrishna	Nagababu, Lakshana		
D E C	5	Myaav	Vidya	Bhushan, Jackie Shroff, Gayathri Rao, Rachana, Waqar		
D E C	19	Nachavule	Ravi Babu	Tanish, Madhavi Latha		
D E C	19	Neninthe	Puri Jagannadh	Ravi Teja, Siya		

=== Other releases ===
The following films were also released in 2008, though the release date remains unknown.

Title	Director	Cast	Studio	Ref
Veedu Mamoolodu Kadu	Ravi Sarma	Rishi, Gopika, Vijay Samrat	Sri Dinesh Bros	

== See also ==
- List of Telugu films of 2007
- Lists of Telugu-language films
- List of Telugu films of 2009
