= List of Telugu films of 2007 =

This is a list of films produced by the Tollywood (Telugu language film industry) based in Hyderabad in the year 2007.

== List ==
Opening		Title	Director	Cast	Production house	Ref
J A N	9	Brahma – The Creator	Cherukuri Srinivasa Rao	Kiran Tej, Madhu Sharma		
J A N	12	Desamuduru	Puri Jagannadh	Allu Arjun, Hansika Motwani		
J A N	14	Yogi	V. V. Vinayak	Prabhas, Nayantara		
J A N	26	Pagale Vennela	CV Reddy	Siva Balaji, Mythili, Brahmanandam		
J A N	26	Poramboku	Srinivas	Navdeep, Ekta Khosla		
J A N	28	Premalekha Rasa	Kulashekar	Venu Malladi, Anjali		
F E B	1	Maharathi	P. Vasu	Balakrishna, Sneha, Meera Jasmine		
F E B	2	Notebook	Chandu	Rajiv, Gayatri		
F E B	2	Sunny	Kamalakar	Kamalakar, Abhishek, Kriti		
F E B	4	Sri Satyanarayana Swamy	Nagesh Naradasi	Suman, Rajkumar, Karthik, Chandra Mohan		
F E B	9	Madhumasam	Chandra Siddhartha	Sumanth, Parvati Melton, Sneha		
F E B	9	Evadaithe Nakenti	Samudra, Jeevitha	Rajasekhar, Samvrita		
F E B	10	Anumanaspadam	Vamsy	Aryan Rajesh, Hamsa Nandini, Tanikella Bharani, Jaya Prakash Reddy		
F E B	15	Lakshmi Kalyanam	Teja	Kalyan Ram, Kajal Aggarwal, Ajay, Sayaji Shinde		
F E B	16	Hara Hara Shambo Sankara	Gedhada Anand Babu	Narasimha Raju, Anuradha, Rami Reddy		
M A R	2	Okkadunnadu	Chandra Sekhar Yeleti	Gopichand, Neha Jhulka, Mahesh Manjrekar		
M A R	3	Amma Nanna Lekunte	Yaramada Ashok Reddy	Krishna, Seema		
M A R	10	Laila Majnu	Anji Seenu	Hari Varu, Jyothi Krishna		
M A R	10	Nekki & Neraj	Purna Adapala	Sivaji, Poonam Kaur		
M A R	12	Vihari	R Tulasikumar	Mithun, Dharmavarapu Subramanyam, Sunil		
M A R	12	Enthavaralaina	Malladi Vinayaka	Kranthi, Manya, Gundu Hanumantha Rao		
M A R	16	Jagadam	Sukumar	Ram, Isha Sahani		
M A R	20	Gnapakam	Uppalapati Narayana Rao	Venkateswara Rao Atluri, Vishakha Singh		
M A R	23	Veduka	Y Jitender	Raja, K Viswanath, Poonam Bajwa		
M A R	25	Devathalu	Kodi Ramakrishna	Rishi, Radhika, Bhanupriya		
A P R	6	Athili Sattibabu LKG	E. V. V. Satyanarayana	Allari Naresh, Kausha Rach, Vidisha		
A P R	6	Kotta Kadha	R. Venu	Vijaya Sai, Rambha, Vikram		
A P R	13	Dhee	Srinu Vytla	Vishnu, Genelia D'Souza, Srihari		
A P R	20	Classmates	K. Vijaya Bhaskar	Sumanth, Sadha, Kamalinee Mukherjee		
A P R	27	Aadavari Matalaku Arthale Verule	Selvaraghavan	Venkatesh, Trisha		
A P R	28	Gundamma Gaari Manavadu	B. Jaya	Ali, Sindhuri, Nicole, Kota, Bharani, Vadivukkarasi, AVS, Mallikarjuna Ra		
M A Y	2	Munna	Vamsi	Prabhas, Ileana D'Cruz		
M A Y	7	Sri Mahalakshmi	Vijayan	Srihari, Suhasini		
M A Y	9	Aata	V. N. Aditya	Siddharth, Ileana D'Cruz		
M A Y	18	Raju Bhai	R Suryakiran	Manoj Manchu, Sheela, Dharmavarapu Subramanyam		
M A Y	25	Bhookailas	Siva Nageswara Rao	Venu Madhav, Mumaith Khan		
M A Y	31	Operation Duryodhana	Posani Krishna Murali	Srikanth, Chalapathi Rao, Mumaith Khan		
J U N	7	Dubai Seenu	Srinu Vaitla	Ravi Teja, Nayantara		
J U N	29	Chandrahas	Siva Shakthi Datta	Harinath Policharla, Krishna, Sarath Babu		
J U N	30	Bahumathi	S. V. Krishna Reddy	Venu, Sangeeta, Pavala Syamala		
J U L	1	Aa Roje	K S Kumar	Brahmanandam, Yaswant, Soumya, M. S. Narayana		
J U L	5	Lakshyam	Sriwass	Gopichand, Anushka, Jagapati Babu		
J U L	5	Satyabhama	Srihari Nanu	Sivaji, Bhumika Chawla, Chandramohan		
J U L	14	Toss	Priyadarshini Ram	Upendra, Priyamani		
J U L	26	Shankar Dada Zindabad	Prabhu Deva	Chiranjeevi, Srikanth, Karishma Kotak		
A U G	10	Allare Allari	Muppalaneni Shiva	Allari Naresh, Venu, Mallika Kapoor, Parvati Melton		
A U G	15	Yamadonga	S. S. Rajamouli	Jr. NTR, Mohan Babu, Priyamani, Mamta Mohandas		
A U G	23	Yamagola	Srinivas Reddy	Srikanth, Venu, Reemma Sen		
S E P	6	Kalyanam	Murali Krishna	Chandu, Samyogitha		
S E P	14	Hello Premistara	Raj Kumar	Sairam Shankar, Sheela, Chandra Mohan		
S E P	15	Chandamama	Krishna Vamsi	Navdeep, Kajal Aggarwal, Sindhu Menon, Siva Balaji		
S E P	21	Vijayadasami	V. Samudra	Kalyan Ram, Vedhika, Saikumar		
S E P	23	Maisamma IPS	Bharath Parepalli	Mumaith Khan, Sayaji Shinde		
S E P	28	Chirutha	Puri Jagannadh	Ram Charan Teja, Neha Sharma		
S E P	28	Happy Days	Sekhar Kammula	Varun Sandesh, Tamannaah Bhatia, Nikhil, Gayatri Rao		
S E P	30	Godava	A. Kodandarami Reddy	Vaibhav Reddy, Sayaji Shinde, Shraddha Arya		
O C T	12	Tulasi	Boyapati Srinu	Venkatesh, Nayantara, Ramya Krishnan		
O C T	18	Athidi	Surender Reddy	Mahesh Babu, Amrita Rao		
O C T	25	Nee Navve Chaalu	Mallikharjuna Eluri	Sivaji, Sindhu Tolani, Brahmanandam		
N O V	1	Bhajantrilu	M. S. Narayana	Sivaji, Savyasachi, Susmitha		
N O V	9	Nava Vasantham	K Shahjahan	Tarun Kumar, Priyamani, Sunil		
N O V	16	Seema Sastri	G. Nageswara Reddy	Allari Naresh, L. B. Sriram, Kovai Sarala, Ali, J P		
N O V	23	Takkari	Amma Rajasekhar	Nithiin, Sadha, Sayaji Shinde		
N O V	27	Athadevaru	Teertha	Keshava, Tejasri		
D E C	14	Mantra	Osho Tulasiram	Sivaji, Charmee Kaur, Jeeva		
D E C	21	Anasuya	Ravi Babu	Bhumika Chawla, Abbas		
D E C	21	Don	Lawrence	Nagarjuna, Anushka		
D E C	28	Bangaru Konda	Kolla Nageswara Rao	Rishi, Navaneet Kaur		

== See also ==
- List of Telugu films of 2006
- Lists of Telugu-language films
- List of Telugu films of 2008
