= Koduku =

Telugu film

- DVD cover
- Directed by: M. S. Narayana
- Written by: M. S. Narayana
- Produced by: Thadi Tatharao
- Starring: Vikram; Aditi Agarwal; Mounika
- Cinematography: AN Raja
- Edited by: K Ram Gopal Reddy
- Music by: Vandemataram Srinivas
- Production company: Sri Maruthi Films
- Release date: June 25, 2004
- Country: India
- Language: Telugu

Koduku (transl. Son) is a 2004 Indian Telugu-language action drama film directed by M. S. Narayana in his directorial debut. The film stars his son, Vikram (in his film debut), Aditi Agarwal and Mounika.

== Plot ==
Vikram's father, Parandhamayya, is banished from a village from ten years after losing a wrestling match. How Vikram seeks revenge forms the rest of the story.

== Cast ==
- Vikram as Vikram
- Aditi Agarwal
- Mounika
- Suman as Parandhamayya
- Ponnambalam as Yalamanda
- Rajan P. Dev as Basava Punnayya
- Prakash Raj as a NRI
- Ahuti Prasad
- Tanikella Bharani
- Venu Madhav
- L. B. Sriram
- Brahmanandam
- M. S. Narayana
- Sunil
- Sudha
- Raghu Babu
- Subbaraya Sarma
- Aarthi Agarwal (special appearance)

== Production ==
The film is produced by Tadi Tata Rao, who produced Joruga Husharuga (2002). It was launched at Annapoorna Studios on 16 November 2003.

== Music ==
The music for the film was composed by Vandemataram Srinivas.

Track listing
No.	Title	Lyrics	Singer(s)	Length
1.	"Parimalame"	Aangoth Bheems	Snehavanth, Shankar Mahadevan	5:16
2.	"Studentante Rockettu"	M. S. Narayana	Tippu	5:01
3.	"Milamila Merise"	Guru Charan	Kumar Sanu, Sadhana Sargam	4:13
4.	"Sindhuram"	Sri Sri	S. P. Balasubrahmanyam	3:58
5.	"Navvu Navvu"	Chandrabose	Udit Narayan, Snehavanth	5:14
6.	"Kosindhi Koyakura"	Goreti Venkanna	Usha, Shankar Mahadevan, Kousalya	5:27
Total length:				29:09

== Reception ==
A critic from Sify opined that "Comedian M.S.Narayana has launched his son Vikram in this film that has nothing new, supported by an inane story and screenplay". Jeevi of Idlebrain.com rated the film one out of five and wrote that "By launching his own son as hero, MS Narayana did more harm to Vikram than any help". Telugu Cinema wrote "M.S.Narayana who failed to become a writer this time tries to become a director and handled story, screenplay, dialogues and direction and he failed miserably in all the departments. He better stick to the routine comedy on the screen. The film is torture to watch".

== Box office ==
The film was a box office failure. M. S. Narayana cited that the reason for the film's failure was that the audience expected him to make a comedy film. After the film's failure, M. S. Narayana went on to direct a comedy film Bhajantrilu (2007) also starring his son Vikram.
