= Aatadista =

- Poster
- Directed by: A. S. Ravi Kumar Chowdary
- Written by: A. S. Ravi Kumar Chowdary
- Produced by: C. Kalyan; S. Vijayanand
- Starring: Nithiin; Kajal Aggarwal; Jayasudha; Nagababu; Raghuvaran; Jayalalita; Sivaprasad
- Cinematography: Jawahar Reddy
- Music by: Chakri
- Release date: 20 March 2008
- Country: India
- Language: Telugu

Aatadista is a 2008 Indian Telugu-language romantic action comedy film, starring Nithiin, Kajal Aggarwal, Raghuvaran, Jayasudha, Nagababu and others. Written and directed by A. S. Ravi Kumar Chowdary, it was produced by C. Kalyan and S. Vijayanand, and scored by Chakri.

The film was released on 20 March 2008 to mixed reviews. The film was later dubbed and released in Hindi as Daring Gundaraaj in 2013, in Bengali as Tumi Amar Mon Bojhona in 2010.

== Plot ==
Jagan, alias Chinna is industrialist Lion Rajendra's jobless son. He falls in love with Sunanda. Meanwhile, he suggests that his father and his rival Raghunath get into a partnership to double up their efficiency. Without his knowledge, his marriage is fixed to Raghunath's daughter, who obviously turns out to be Sunanda, but the families are not on great terms even after they fix the match. Raghunath is dealing in tobacco businesses that is actually owned by Bonala Shankar, a brusque and notorious MLA. Rajendra doesn't want to deal in that area, but Bonala threatens the board of directors too. Now Jagan has to deal with this corrupt politicians and plays a game with him that shakes him from his very roots - spreads a rumor that he hit Shankar.

== Cast ==
- Nithin as Jagan "Chinna"
- Kajal Aggarwal as Sunanda
- Raghuvaran as Raghunath
- Nagababu as Lion Rajendra
- Jayasudha as Jagan's mother
- Jayalalita as Raghunath's wife
- Narsing Yadav as Narsing, Bonala Shankar's henchman
- Ravi Prakash as Jagan's elder brother
- Chalapathi Rao
- Narra Venkateswara Rao
- Sivaprasad as Bonala Shankar
- Amit Tiwari as Bonala Shankar's son
- Venu Madhav as Mama
- Babu Mohan as Bonala Shankar's brother-in-law
- Raghunatha Reddy as Party Leader
- Chinna as C. I.
- Allari Subhashini as Bonala Shankar's wife
- Ananth Babu as Lion Rajendra's PA
- Mumaith Khan as item number

== Soundtrack ==
Aatadista

Soundtrack album by Chakri
- Released: 1 February 2008
- Recorded: 2007
- Genre: Feature film soundtrack
- Language: Telugu
- Label: Aditya Music

Chakri chronology
Takkari (2007)	Aatadista (2008)	Kasipatnam Chudara Babu (2008)

No.	Title	Lyrics	Singer(s)	Length
1.	"Style Style"	Ashok Tej Suddala	Suraj Jagan	5:04
2.	"Pappeede Chummade"	Ramajogayya Sastry	Devan, Kousalya	4:17
3.	"Vachindiro Silaka"	Ravi Kumar Bhaskarabhatla	Simha, Suchitra, Fareedh	5:09
4.	"Mila Mila"	Ravi Kumar Bhaskarabhatla	Ravi Verma, Kousalya	4:16
5.	"Regipoye"	Sahithi	Chakri, Suchitra	4:55
6.	"Sorry Sorry"	Chirravuri Vijay Kumar	Fareedh	4:28

== Reception ==
The Hindu opined that "The script meanders and strangely it's a villain's show all the way!".
