= Bhagyalakshmi Bumper Draw =

- Movie Poster
- Directed by: Nidhi Prasad
- Written by: L. B. Sriram (dialogues)
- Screenplay by: Nidhi Prasad
- Story by: Aishwarya Kaushik
- Based on: Malamaal Weekly by Priyadarshan
- Produced by: Raju & Praveen
- Starring: Rajendra Prasad; Rishi; Farjana
- Cinematography: Sarath
- Edited by: Shankar
- Music by: Chakri
- Production company: Silver Screen Movies
- Release date: 16 November 2006
- Running time: 139 mins
- Country: India
- Language: Telugu

Bhagyalakshmi Bumper Draw is a 2006 Indian Telugu-language comedy film directed by Nidhi Prasad. It stars Rajendra Prasad, Rishi, and Farjana with music composed by Chakri. The film is produced by Raju and Praveen on Silver Screen Movies banner. It is a remake of the Hindi film Malamaal Weekly (2006; an adaptation of the 1998 film Waking Ned).

== Cast ==
- Rajendra Prasad as Bullabbai
- Rishi as Kittu
- Farjana as Bhagyalakshmi
- Kiran Rathod as Ranikasula Renuka Rani
- K.Nagababu as Lottery Inspector
- Brahmanandam as Joshua Gotham
- Ali as Yesudasu Gotham
- M. S. Narayana as Varadaraju
- Tanikella Bharani as Paala Pullayya
- Chakri as (cameo appearance)
- Mallikarjuna Rao as Astrologer
- Benarjee as Sarvarayudu
- Venu Madhav as Aphisu
- L.B. Sriram as Barber Chanti
- Kondavalasa as Pilli Pentayya
- Krishna Bhagawan as Daniel
- Gundu Sudarshan
- Kadambari Kiran as Chitti Babu
- Ram Jagan
- Kovai Sarala as Mary Gotham
- Bhuvaneswari as Mallika Sharbat
- Abhinayasri as Parvathi Gotham
- Mumaith Khan as item number
- Seema as Varalakshmi

== Soundtrack ==
Bhagyalakshmi Bumper Draw

Film score by Chakri
- Released: 19 October 2006
- Recorded: 2006
- Genre: Soundtrack
- Length: 22:51
- Label: Aditya Music
- Producer: Chakri

Chakri chronology
Devadasu (2006)	Bhagyalakshmi Bumper Draw (2006)	Satyabhama (2007)

Music composed by Chakri.

No.	Title	Lyrics	Singer(s)	Length
1.	"Maye Chesindi"	Kandikonda	Udit Narayan, Shweta Pandit, Aadarshini	3:54
2.	"Aa Tholisari"	Kandikonda	Hemachandra, Kousalya	5:07
3.	"Manmadhularaa"	Bhaskarabhatla	Sunanda	4:41
4.	"Chakkani Chukka"	Kandikonda	Ravi Varma, Teena	4:28
5.	"Bhigi Kowgili"	Bhaskarabhatla	Shaan, Kousalya	4:36
Total length:				22:51

== Reception ==
Jeevi of Idlebrain rated the film three out of five and wrote that "Bhagyalakshmi Bumper Draw is a typical entertainer for the frontbenchers."
