= Premabhishekam (2008 film) =

2008 film directed by S. S. Vikram Gandhi

- Poster
- Directed by: S. S. Vikram Gandhi
- Written by: Dialogues: Ramaswamy; Srinivasulu; Venu Madhav
- Story by: Dasari Narayana Rao
- Produced by: Venu Madhav
- Starring: Venu Madhav; Priya Mohan; Ruthika; Srihari
- Cinematography: Srinivasa Reddy
- Edited by: Nagireddy
- Music by: Chakri
- Distributed by: Savitri Cinema
- Release date: 14 March 2008 (India)
- Running time: 157 minutes
- Country: India
- Language: Telugu

Premabhishekam is a 2008 Indian Telugu-language comedy film directed by S. S. Vikram Gandhi, starring Venu Madhav, newcomer Priya Mohan and Ruthika along with Ali, Brahmanandam, Nagababu, and Srihari. This film is based on the 1964 Hollywood film Send Me No Flowers.

== Cast ==
- Venu Madhav as Nageshwar Rao
- Priya Mohan as Sridevi
- Ruthika as Jayasudha
- Srihari as Hari Bhai
- Geetha Singh
- Ali
- Brahmanandam
- Naga Babu
- M. S. Narayana
- Sunil
- Jaya Prakash Reddy
- Dharmavarapu Subrahmanyam as Dr. Gummadi
- Krishna Bhagavaan
- Shankar Melkote as Ad Agency director
- Sana as Sridevi's mother
- Pradeep Kondiparthi as Sridevi's father
- Srinivasa Reddy
- Duvvasi Mohan
- Uttej
- Kondavalasa
- Telangana Shakuntala
- AVS as Priest
- Kadambari Kiran
- Tirupathi Prakash

== Production ==
In mid-2007 while the film was still in pre-production, Srinivasa Reddy was attached to direct the film. The film was named after the 1981 film of the same name, which was about a cancer patient. Dasari Narayana Rao, who directed the older film, wrote the story for this film. To distinguish between that film, this film was given the tagline of Veediki cancer ledu (this guy is not suffering from cancer). A song was shot at Ramoji Film City in early 2008.

== Soundtrack ==
The soundtrack was composed by Chakri.

Track listing
No.	Title	Lyrics	Singer(s)	Length
1.	"Sridevi Nageswara Rao"	Bhaskarabhatla	K. S. Chithra, Tippu	4:30
2.	"Na Peru Kamali"	Chandrabose	Malathi Sharma, Sinha	4:10
3.	"Premabhishekam" (Theme)	—	Chakri	3:14
4.	"Neeku Naku"	Bhaskarabhatla	Chakri, Kousalya	4:31
5.	"Vandanam"	Chandrabose	Mano, Noel James, Venu Madhav	6:08
Total length:				22:33
