= Bhuvaneswari (actress) =

Indian actress and model

- Born: Chittoor, Andhra Pradesh, India
- Other names: Poonaikkan Bhuvaneshwari, Ravi Shankar
- Citizenship: Indian
- Occupations: Actress, Model, Presenter, bold, Socialist,
- Years active: 1999–2016

Bhuvaneswari (born Chittoor, Andhra Pradesh) is an Indian model, film and television actress, known for her contributions to Telugu and Tamil cinema and television.

== Career ==
In 1999, she is well known for her debut antagonist revenge role in Gokulam Veedu television serial as younger daughter which got more attention and trigger among audiences and hence received more antagonist roles in several soap operas. She rose to stardom with the 2003 Tamil film, Boys in which she played Rani in a supporting role. She has received critical acclaim for her antagonist roles in several soap operas. Kurkure is her first film in a lead role.

== Filmography ==
Year	Film	Role	Language	Notes	Ref.
2000	Kandha Kadamba Kathir Vela	Mallika	Tamil		
2000	Priyamanavale	Priya's colleague	Tamil		
2000	Budget Padmanabhan	Sakthi	Tamil		
2001	Rishi		Tamil		
2003	Donga Ramudu and Party		Telugu		
2003	Charminar		Telugu		
2003	Boys	Rani	Tamil		
2004	Valliddaru Okkate		Telugu		
2004	Gudumba Shankar	Parabrahma Swamy (Interest)	Telugu		
2004	Ennavo Pudichirukku	Saroja	Tamil		
2005	Konchem Touchlo Vunte Cheputanu		Telugu		
2005	Nuvvante Naakishtam		Telugu		
2005	Kundakka Mandakka		Tamil		
2005	Chakram		Telugu		
2006	Bhagyalakshmi Bumper Draw	Mallika Sharbat	Telugu		
2006	Thalai Nagaram	Vaani	Tamil		
2006	Seethakoka Chiluka		Telugu		
2007	Manase Mounama	Anjaneya's wife	Tamil		
2007	Bhookailas		Telugu		
2007	Hello Premistara		Telugu		
2007	Seema Sastry	Neelambari	Telugu		
2008	Kuberulu		Telugu		
2008	Nagaram	Vaani	Telugu		
2008	Wall Poster		Telugu		
2008	Krishnarjuna	Jyotish	Telugu		
2008	Kurkure		Telugu	Lead Actress	
2009	Picha Manasu		Telugu		
2009	Anjaneyulu	Bhavani	Telugu		
2009	Gaja		Telugu	Special appearance	
2010	Ranga The Donga		Telugu		
2011	Agarathi		Telugu		
2013	Gaali		Telugu		
2013	Sravya		Telugu		
2014	Ala Jaragindi Oka Roju		Telugu		

== Television ==
Year	Title	Role	Channel
1999-2000	Gokulam Veedu		
2000–2001	Chithi	Sangeetha Shree	Sun TV
2003–2004	Sorgam	Rajini	Sun TV
2005–2007	Raja Rajeswari	Valli / Raathiri Devi	Sun TV
2009–2010	Thekkathi Ponnu	Poun Thaayi	Kalaignar TV
2014–2016	Chandralekha	Vasundra Devi	Sun TV
2014–2015	Oru Kai Osai	Maya	Zee Tamil
2015	Pasamalar	Bhuvaneswari	Sun TV
