= Thekkathi Ponnu =

- Genre: Soap opera
- Written by: Dialogue; Kavingnar Thenmozhi Das
- Screenplay by: Rathnakumar
- Directed by: Bharathiraja
- Starring: Napoleon; Ranjitha; Swarnamalya; Chandrasekhar; Bhuvaneswari
- Theme music composer: Ilaiyaraaja
- Opening theme: "Thekkathi Ponnu"
- Composer: Devendran
- Country of origin: India
- Original language: Tamil
- No. of seasons: 1
- No. of episodes: 750

Production
- Producer: P. Jayaraj
- Camera setup: Multi-camera
- Running time: approx. 20-22 minutes per episode
- Production company: Manoj Creations

Original release
- Network: Kalaignar TV
- Release: 14 April 2008 – 20 September 2011

Thekkathi Ponnu is a 2008 Tamil soap opera that aired on Kalaignar TV. The show premiered on 14 April 2008 and aired Monday through Friday at 8:30PM IST. The show starred Napoleon, Ranjitha, Swarnamalya, Chandrasekhar and Bhuvaneswari.

The show was directed by Bharathiraja and it marked his television debut as director. It was produced by P. Jayaraj under Manoj Creations. It had been receiving the highest ratings of Tamil serials and received high praising from viewers. The show last aired on 20 September 2011 and ended with 750 episodes.

== Plot ==
The story of three villages, three families and three generations. And the generations-long conflict between the families of Napoleon and Chandrasekhar. Another aspect of the story is to portray village girls and how they possess gender equality without having to fight for it the way girls in towns and cities have to. The serial would like to show how, in work and relationships and family, women in villages seem to share more equally in villages.

== Cast ==
Main cast

- Napoleon
- Ranjitha / Bhuvaneswari
- Swarnamalya
- Chandrasekhar
- Pragathi

Supporting cast

- Devipriya
- Vishali Muralitharan
- Stalin
- Sankarapandiyan
- Senpagam
- Geetha
- Deni Mrugan
- Sridar
- Shivan
- Kanga
- Gayathri Sri
- Sathyapama
- P.Sellakkannan
- M.N Paalu
- Vairamala
- Dhanya
- Saraya
- Markpiya
- Rajesh
- Manokaran
- Dhinesh

== Production ==
The show was shot at locations such as Theni, Kambam and Andipatti.

== Airing history ==
The show started airing on Kalaignar TV on 14 April 2008. It aired on Monday to Friday 8:30PM IST. Later its timing changed to Monday to Thursday at 8:30PM IST.

== Awards and nominations ==
Year	Award	Category	Recipient	Result
2009	Mylapore Academy Awards	Best Director	Bharathiraja	Won
2009	Mylapore Academy Awards	Cinematographer	Pattukottai Ramesh	Won
2009	Mylapore Academy Awards	Best Series	Thekkathi Ponnu	Won

== International broadcasts ==
The Series was released on 14 April 2008 on Kalaignar TV. The Show was also broadcast internationally on Channel's international distribution. It airs in Sri Lanka, Singapore, Malaysia, South East Asia, Middle East, Oceania, South Africa and Sub Saharan Africa on Kalaignar TV and also aired in United States, Canada, Europe on Kalaignar Ayngaran TV.

Country	Network	Time
Malaysia	Astro Kalaignar TV	Monday-Friday; 6:30PM
Singapore	Astro Kalaignar TV	Monday-Friday; 6:30PM
United Kingdom	Ayngaran TV; Kalaignar TV	Monday-Friday; 8:30PM
