= Venu Madhav (actor) =

Indian actor (1968-2019)

- Born: Kunath Venu Madhav; 28 September 1968; Kodad, Telangana, India
- Died: 25 September 2019 (aged 50) (Note: Sources reported different ages at his death. While The Indian Express stated that Madhav was aged 52, The Hindu reported that he was 50 years old.)
- Occupations: Actor; comedian
- Spouse: Sree Vani
- Children: 2
- Awards: Nandi Awards

Kunath Venu Madhav (28 September 1966/68 – 25 September 2019), was an Indian actor, television presenter, mimicry artist and comedian known for his works predominantly in Telugu cinema. He acted in approximately 500 films in a variety of roles, starting his career as an impressionist; imitating celebrities, politicians, and local dialects. He received breakthrough in cinema with works such as Master (1997), and Tholi Prema (1998).

In 2007, he received the state Nandi Award for Best Male Comedian for his work in the action comedy film Lakshmi. He won two CineMAA Awards for best comedian for his work in V. V. Vinayaks' romantic comedy Dil (2003); and S. S. Rajamouli's sports comedy Sye (2004).

== Early life ==
Madhav was born in Kodad in Suryapet district of Telangana. He was married to Sree Vanisri and has two sons.

== Death ==
Madhav died on 25 September 2019 at Yashoda Hospitals, Secunderabad, due to liver and kidney complications.

== Filmography ==
=== As an actor ===
List of Venu Madhav film credits
Year	Title	Role	Notes
1996	Sampradhyam		
1996	Merupu		
1997	Chilakkottudu		
1997	Gokulamlo Seeta		
1997	Pelli Chesukundam		
1997	Rukmini		
1997	Master	Venu	
1998	Suswagatham		
1998	Pandaga		
1998	Pavitra Prema		
1998	Sri Ramulayya		
1998	Tholi Prema	Arnold Sekhar	
1998	Suryavamsam		
1998	Choodalani Vundi		
1998	Snehithulu	Venu Madhav	
1998	Ganesh		
1998	Suprabhatam		
1998	Abhishekam		
1998	Suryudu		
1999	Naa Hrudayamlo Nidurinche Cheli	Bujji's friend	
1999	Thammudu	Subbu's friend	
1999	Rajakumarudu	Raja's collegemate	
1999	Ravoyi Chandamama	KVR	
2000	Yuvaraju	Sehgal Baba	
2000	Maa Pelliki Randi		
2000	Manasunna Maaraju		
2000	Manasichanu		
2000	Uncle		
2000	Ennavalle	Mohan	Tamil film
2001	Lady Bachelors		
2001	Priyamaina Neeku	Chacha	
2001	Akka Bavekkada		
2001	Chinna	Chinna's friend	
2001	Snehamante Idera		
2001	Andariki Vandanalu		
2001	Subbu		
2002	Chandravamsam	Purohit	
2002	Aadi		
2002	Vasu		
2002	Adrustam	Tarun's friend	
2002	Sontham	Shesham's friend	
2002	Nuvve Nuvve		
2002	Gemeni	Car Mechanic	
2002	Premalo Pavani Kalyan		
2002	Ninu Choodaka Nenundalenu		
2003	Naaga		
2003	Dil	Venu	CineMAA Award for Best Comedian
2003	Dham	Uday Tarun	
2003	Simhadri	Iyer	
2003	Kalyana Ramudu	Shesham's friend	
2003	Neeke Manasichaanu	Kondababu	
2003	Sambaram		
2003	Simhachalam		
2003	Pellamtho Panenti		
2003	Abhimanyu	Venu	
2004	Andhrawala		
2004	Anandamanandamaye	Ammi Raju	
2004	Venky	Train Collector Nippu Nagaraju	
2004	Naa Autograph	Subba Rao	
2004	Arya	Ajay's friend	
2004	Varsham		
2004	Adavi Ramudu	Hanumanth	
2004	Samba	sidekick of McDowell Mani	
2004	Shiva Shankar		
2004	Swamy		
2004	Intlo Srimathi Veedhilo Kumari		
2004	Gowri	Dev Anand	
2004	Gudumba Shankar		
2004	Sye	Nalla Balu	CineMAA Award for Best Comedian
2004	Shankar Dada MBBS		
2004	Mass	Beggar	
2005	Dhairyam		
2005	Orey Pandu	Venu	
2005	Sankranthi	Nalla Balu	
2005	Sravanamasam	MA Ratnam	
2005	Bunny	Daiva Sahayam's assistant	
2005	Radha Gopalam		
2005	Subash Chandra Bose	Radio	
2005	Hungama	Balu	
2005	Mr. Errababu	Kris	
2005	Athanokkade	Gulab Singh	
2005	Andarivaadu	Govindraju's friend	
2005	Kanchanamala Cable TV		
2005	Super	Tattooist	
2005	Please Naaku Pellaindi	Guruji	
2005	Allari Bullodu	Balu	
2005	Muddula Koduku	Malligadu a.k.a. 'Manmadha' Rao	Telugu version
2005	Good Boy	Veturi Sundara Rama Murthy	
2005	Political Rowdy		
2005	Chhatrapati	Mahesh Nanda	
2005	Jai Chiranjeeva	Venu	
2005	Bhageeratha		
2005	Modati Cinema		
2005	Moguds Pellams		
2005	Seenugadu Chiranjeevi Fan		
2005	Mahanandi	Anand	
2005	Gowtam SSC		
2006	Devadasu		
2006	Lakshmi	Tiger Satti	Nandi Award for Best Male Comedian
2006	Happy		
2006	Sarada Saradaga	Waiter	
2006	Ranam	Venu	
2006	Raam	Janaki's brother	
2006	Pokiri	Vice-President of Beggars Association	
2006	Veerabhadra		
2006	Bangaram	Sathish	
2006	Kithakithalu	Chain snatching thief	
2006	Maayajaalam	Ghost	
2006	Ashok	Jaggu	
2006	Valliddari Vayasu Padahare	Arunachalam	
2006	Andala Ramudu	Ramudu's step-brother	
2006	Bhagyalakshmi Bumper Draw	Aphisu	
2006	Gopi - Goda Meeda Pilli	Krishnudu	
2006	Pellaina Kothalo		
2006	Khatarnak	Puli	
2006	Annavaram	Narasimha	
2007	Desamuduru	Tea seller	
2007	Yogi		
2007	Maharadhi		
2007	Evadaithe Nakenti		
2007	Madhumasam	Pullayya	
2007	Gundamma Gaari Manavadu	Boxer	
2007	Sri Mahalakshmi	Beggar	
2007	Allare Allari		
2007	Munna	Mohan	
2007	Operation Duryodhana		
2007	Bhookailas	Kailas	
2007	Toss		
2007	Athidhi		
2007	Lakshyam	Venu	
2007	Viyyalavari Kayyalu		
2007	Seema Sastry		
2007	Takkari		
2007	Maharajasri		
2007	Shankar Dada Zindabad		
2007	Godava		
2007	Bhajantrilu		
2007	Chandrahas		
2007	Pagale Vennela		
2008	Krishna	Tenant	
2008	Donga Sachinollu		
2008	Krishnarjuna		
2008	Bhadradri		
2008	Premabhishekam	Nageswar Rao	Also producer and dialogue writer
2008	John Apparao 40 Plus		
2008	Aatadista		
2008	Bhale Dongalu	Lorry Driver	
2008	Bommana Brothers Chandana Sisters		
2008	Michael Madana Kamaraju		
2008	Hare Ram		
2008	Ullasamga Utsahamga	Fraud Billionaire	
2008	Maa Ayana Chanti Pilladu		
2008	Kathanayakudu		
2008	Gajibiji		
2008	Siddu from Sikakulam	Apple	
2008	Gunde Jhallumandi	Software Engineer Rajesh	
2008	Chintakayala Ravi	Sai	
2008	Blade Babji	Babji's gang member	
2008	Dongala Bandi	Pinakapani / Don Amrutapani	
2008	Neninthe	Ravi's assistant	
2008	King	Tension Bonda	
2009	Drona		
2009	Maska		
2009	Konchem Ishtam Konchem Kashtam	Bangaram	
2009	Yagna		Kannada film
2009	Malli Malli		
2009	Tik Tik Tik		
2009	Kick	Driver Azam	
2009	Naa Style Veru	S.I. Rajalingam	
2009	Evaraina Epudaina		
2009	Gopi Gopika Godavari		
2009	Samardhudu		
2009	Rechipo	Venu	
2009	Ek Niranjan	Chitti	
2009	Rs.999 Matrame		
2010	Seeta Ramula Kalyanam Lankalo		
2010	Aakasa Ramanna	P.Timothy	
2010	Sneha Geetham	Lecturer AIDS Papa Rao	
2010	Don Seenu	Madhu Pithre	
2010	Simha	Venkataratnam	
2010	Brindavanam	Chitti	
2010	Kathi Kantha Rao	Vaasu	
2011	Katha Screenplay Darsakatvam Appalaraju	Gannu	
2011	Dongala Mutha		
2011	Shakti	Satti Babu	
2011	Veera	Balaji	
2011	Chattam	Badhri	
2011	Maaro		
2011	Badrinath		
2011	Dhada		
2011	Mugguru		
2011	Mogudu	Venu Babu	
2011	Money Money, More Money	Shankarabharanam	
2011	Veedu Theda	Udata Bhaskar	
2012	Bodyguard	'Cash' Reddy	
2012	Racha	Raj's friend	
2012	Nuvvekaddunte Nenakkadunta		
2013	Naayak	Venu	
2013	Seethamma Vakitlo Sirimalle Chettu	Census officer	
2013	Jaffa	Alladdin	
2013	Adda		
2013	Something Something	Cone Ice Bava	
2013	Masala	Census officer	
2013	Nenem...Chinna Pillana?		
2014	Yuddham	Seenu	
2014	Ee Varsham Sakshiga		
2014	Laddu Babu		
2014	Jump Jilani		
2014	Autonagar Surya		
2015	Rey	Virus	
2015	Rudhramadevi	Tittibi	
2016	Dr. Paramanandaiah Student		

=== As dubbing artist ===
List of Venu Madhav film dubbing credits
Year	Title	For Whom	Character	Notes	Ref.
2003	Magic Magic 3D	Owen Burke	Thief's assistant	Telugu dubbed version	
2004	Prema Chadarangam	Vivek	Harichandra	Telugu dubbed version	
2010	Sandadi	Charle	Pavan's friend		

=== Television ===
List of Venu Madhav television credits
Title	Role	Channel	Ref.
Once More Please	Host	Gemini TV	
Smile Raja Smile	Judge	ETV	
