= Michael Madana Kamaraju =

- Theatrical release poster
- Directed by: Nidhi Prasad
- Written by: Chintapalli Ramana
- Produced by: Raju; Praveen
- Starring: Srikanth; Prabhu Deva; Charmy Kaur
- Edited by: Marthand K. Venkatesh
- Music by: Chakri
- Production company: Silver Screen Movies
- Release date: 18 April 2008
- Running time: 135 mins
- Country: India
- Language: Telugu

Michael Madana Kamaraju is a 2008 Telugu comedy-drama film directed by Nidhi Prasad. It stars Srikanth, Prabhu Deva, and Charmy Kaur in the lead roles. Michael Madana Kamaraju opened to mixed reviews in April 2008. It was dubbed into Hindi as Badle Ki Aag (2008).

== Cast ==
- Srikanth as Madan
- Prabhu Deva as Michael/Ravi
- Sunil as Kamaraju
- Charmy Kaur as Archana
- Asha Saini as Mandira
- Kota Srinivasa Rao as Photo Studio Owner
- Brahmanandam as James
- Ali as Savitri, Michael's friend
- Venu Madhav as Venu
- Kovai Sarala as Ramanamma, Michael's mother
- Sayaji Shinde as Gurajada Krishnamurthy, Michael's father
- Giri Babu as Rama Chandra Murthy, Ravi's father
- Chandra Mohan as Chandram, Madan's father
- Geetha as Vasundhara Varma, Madan's mother
- Suhasini Maniratnam as Snehalatha, Ravi's mother
- Nagendra Babu as Ravindra Babu, Archana's father
- Janaki Sabesh as Rajyalakshmi, Mandira's mother
- Sumitra as Lakshmi, Archana's mother
- Nassar as Raghunath‚ Manidra's father
- Mallikarjuna Rao as Ram Murthy
- Surya as Surya
- Jaya Prakash Reddy as Jayprakash Garu
- Kondavalasa Lakshmana Rao as Photo Studio Owner's Assistant
- L. B. Sriram as Pandu
- Abhinayashree as Julie
- Kavita
- Sangeeta
- Archana
- Kadambari Kiran

== Production ==
Nidhi Prasad managed to convince Srikanth to feature in the film, despite the failure of their previous venture together. Prabhu Deva accepted to play a role in the film, without having listened to the story, while Charmy Kaur was signed to play the leading female role. The team primarily shot scenes in outdoor locations, but could not shoot abroad as a result of Nidhi Prasad's fear of flying. The team held an audio launch event in March 2008 with Suresh Babu, Nithin and Bhumika Chawla attending as chief guests.

== Soundtrack ==
No.	Title	Singer(s)	Length
1.	"Kanul Alogili Looki"	Kousalya
2.	"Come On Baby"	Chakri
3.	"Pampara Panaso"	Udit Narayan, Adarshini
4.	"Jum Jum Jummani Prema"	Sadhana Sargam, Swaraj Jagan
5.	"Naa Rasi Kanya Rai"	Ranjith, Sunidhi Chauhan
6.	"Chitaru Komma"	Malavika, Ravi Verma, Simha

== Release ==
The film opened to mixed reviews in April 2008. Indiaglitz.com gave the film a negative review and stated "the director failed to utilise the talents of most of the artistes by scripting casual comedy scenes all through the film", while adding he also "failed to establish many characters in the film and the audiences had to grope in the dark as to how a character had appeared on the screen and it takes time to correlate that character with the scene". Sify.com stated "there is originality and strength in the story, narration and direction", but, "the movie's length is a bit too much full with three hours" and "this will sure work against the movie's prospects".
