= 1977 (film) =

2009 film by G.N.Dinesh Kumar

- Theatrical release poster
- Directed by: G. N. Dinesh Kumar
- Written by: G. N. Dinesh Kumar
- Produced by: R. Sarathkumar; Radhika Sarathkumar
- Starring: R. Sarathkumar; Farzana; Namitha
- Cinematography: K. Boopathy
- Edited by: Anthony
- Music by: Vidyasagar
- Production company: Supreme Film Works
- Release date: 6 March 2009
- Running time: 149 minutes
- Country: India
- Language: Tamil

1977 is a 2009 Indian Tamil-language action film directed by G. N. Dinesh Kumar in his debut. It stars R. Sarathkumar, Farzana and Namitha. The music was composed by Vidyasagar. The film was released on 6 March 2009, and is best remembered for Vivek's "Awas Anjing" (transl. Beware of dogs) scene.

== Plot ==
The film begins at a fishing hamlet in Tamil Nadu where an elderly Rajashekar is worshipped as a godfather by many. His amiable ways of living won him many friends. His son Vetrivel is an acclaimed scientist. He is received with gusto by the whole village after he returns winning awards from Central government. Unfortunately, a glance at a vernacular on a news report on Malaysia shocks Rajashekar, who immediately develops cardiac arrest and dies.

Vetrivel learns of the incident and decides to unravel the mystery behind the death. He sets off to Malaysia. Vetrivel gets acquainted with a local reporter Inba, who falls for him. With her help, he finds out a disturbing truth about his father's life. Rajashekar is former police officer in Malaysia who falls to the conspiracy of a baddie and is arrested for no fault of his. Rajashekar eventually pays the price for being honest by losing his family and settles down in Tamil Nadu with his young son.

In his quest to prove that his father is innocent, Vetrivel re-opens the case and gets the help of Chandhini, a lawyer who is the daughter of erstwhile public prosecutor, Gaandivan, who argued against Rajashekar 30 years ago. He also finds his mother in the process. The rest of the film is all but how Vetrivel rewrites history, proves his father's innocence, and avenges the bad elements.

== Cast ==
- R. Sarathkumar as Rajashekar "Rahasiya" and Vetrivel
- Farzana as Inba
- Namitha as Chandini
- Vivek as Paraman
- Jayasudha as Vetrivel's mother / Rajashekar's wife
- Radha Ravi as Dr Sharma
- Vijayakumar as DGP Padmanabhan
- Ilavarasu
- Shankar Siva as Criminal Lawyer
- Cell Murugan as Murugan
- Bonda Mani
- Bava Lakshmanan
- Yank Kassim

== Production ==
1977 is the directorial debut of Dinesh Kumar, previously an advertisement filmmaker. R. Sarathkumar and Namitha paired for the third time after Aai and Chanakya. The film was prominently shot at Malaysia, including the Twin Towers. The editor Anthony was going to remove the "Awas Anjing" comedy track but actor Vivek was insistent to retain it.

== Soundtrack ==
The music was composed by Vidyasagar. Karthik of Milliblog wrote, "Vidyasagar's foray back into hardcore commercial work is just endurable".

Track listing
No.	Title	Lyrics	Singer(s)	Length
1.	"Arabi Kadal"	Pa. Vijay	Sunitha Sarathy
2.	"Hawai Theevil"	Pa. Vijay	KK, Sowmya Raoh
3.	"Ore Oru"	Pa. Vijay	Krithika, Vijay Yesudas
4.	"Vangha Kadal"	Na. Muthukumar	Shankar Mahadevan
5.	"Yenathu Uyire"	Jayantha	Madhu Balakrishnan, Sadhana Sargam

== Critical reception ==
Sify stated "How long will Sarath Kumar go on doing double role as father and son? Sorry to say, the film is as avoidable as [a] migraine". Pavithra Srinivasan of Rediff.com rated the film one-and-a-half out of five stars and stated that "1977 might have worked had it been released in 1977 and not in 2009!" A critic from Chennai Online wrote that "Debutant director Dinesh Kumar, who shows some promise in the opening sequences, fizzles out and becomes a pretty ordinary director in the remaining sequences. Almost all the sequences can be pre-conceived by the viewers and the director has ensured that the 'grey matter' inside the viewers' brain remains least disturbed by his film". Cinesouth appreciated the film's cinematography and depiction of Malaysia, and commented, "It would have been a super hit had '1977' got released in that year".
