= Mumaith Khan =

Indian actress and model

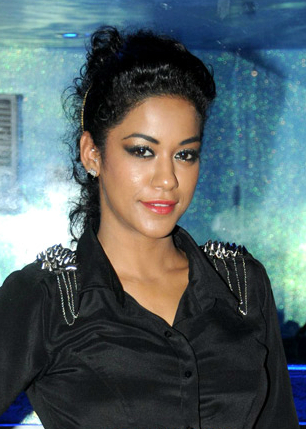
- Khan at the first look launch of Fattu Saala
- Born: 1 September 1985 (age 41); Bombay, Maharashtra, India
- Occupations: Film actress; model
- Years active: 2004–present

Mumaith Khan (born 1 September 1985) is an Indian actress and model. She has appeared in numerous item numbers primarily in Telugu, Hindi, and Tamil films.

== Early life ==
Khan was born on 1 September 1985. She was born and brought up in Bombay (present Mumbai). Her father is from Pakistan and her mother is from Tiruchirappalli.

== Career ==
Khan has acted primarily in Telugu, Hindi, Tamil and Kannada language films. Besides movies, she has contested in the reality shows like Jhalak Dikhla Jaa 6 and first season of Bigg Boss Telugu. As of now, she has been a part of nearly 100 movies. Her call to fame was her cameo performance in the Sanjay Dutt starrer hit Munna Bhai MBBS. Her career was rocked by a controversy of drug allegations in which many south movie stars were also questioned. Her relationship with a prime suspect Calvin Mascerehas was also at the centre of investigation. Because of those allegations, in July 2018, Mumaith was evicted mid way from Big Boss Telugu season 1 for questioning by the special investigation team in relation to a drug racket along with 20 other prominent celebrities from South film industry. During the investigation she volunteered to giver her hair, fluid and nail samples which the SIT refused. Later, she returned to the reality show after the interrogation.

In December 2016, Mumaith fell down from the bed at her apartment and hit her head which led to an internal injury damaging her nerves in the brain. She was in coma for 15 days and the doctors said it would take her two years to recover after treatment and surgery. Subsequently, this led to few neurological health problems like seizures and has been on medication for last two years. This also led to her gaining weight as her doctor advised her to keep away from the gym. Since then she has been trying to get back in shape gradually and is optimistic of making a comeback.

Khan made her comeback with Telugu horror film Heza.

== Filmography ==
=== Telugu ===
1. Swamy (2004) (Cameo)
2. 143 (2004) (Cameo)
3. Chatrapati (2005) (Cameo)
4. Pokiri (2006) (Item Number)
5. Samanyudu (2006)
6. Bhagyalakshmi Bumper Draw (2006) (Cameo)
7. Yogi (2007) (Item Number)
8. Bhookailas (2007) (Item Number)
9. Evadaithe Nakenti (2007) as Inspector F. Maisamma
10. Aadavari Matalaku Ardhalu Verule (2007) (Item Number)
11. Sri Mahalakshmi (2007) (Cameo)
12. Operation Duryodhana (2007) as Ruchi
13. Bhajantrilu (2007) (Cameo)
14. Seema Sastri (2007) (Cameo)
15. Maisamma IPS (2007) as IPS Mysamma
16. Vishakha Express (2008)
17. Veedu Mamoolodu Kadu (2008) (Cameo)
18. Mangatayaru Tiffin Centre (2008) as Dolly / Mangatayaru
19. Lakshmi Putrudu (2008)
20. Aatadista (2008)
21. Manchu Kurise Velalo (2008) (Cameo)
22. Sawaal (2008) (Cameo)
23. Bujjigadu (2008) (Item Number)
24. Neninthe (2008) as Mumaith Khan (herself)
25. Dhee Ante Dhee (2009) (Cameo)
26. Punnami Naagu (2009) as The Female Snake
27. Target (2009) as Nandini
28. Magadheera (2009) (Item Number)
29. Saarai Veerraju (2009)
30. L Board (2010)
31. Gaali Seenu (2010) (Cameo)
32. Nenu Naa Rakshasi (2011)
33. Poison (2011)
34. Dheera (2011)
35. Gundello Godari (2012)
36. Prathi Kshanam (2012) (Unreleased)
37. Saradaga Ammayitho (2013)
38. Kevvu Keka (2013) (Item Number)
39. Gaddam Gang (Cameo) (2015)
40. Dictator (Cameo) (2016)
41. Thikka (2016)
42. Heza (2019)
43. RDX Love (2019)

=== Hindi ===
1. Yeh Kya Ho Raha Hai? (2002) (Cameo)
2. Kaante (2002) (Cameo) (Uncredited)
3. Shakti: The Power (2002) (cameo)
4. Stumped (2003) (Cameo)
5. Munna Bhai M.B.B.S. (2003) as Reena (Hospital dancer) (Cameo)
6. Julie (2004) (Cameo)
7. Asambhav (2004) (Cameo)
8. Hulchul (2004) (Cameo)
9. Dhadkanein (2005)
10. Lucky: No Time for Love (2005) as Sunaina
11. Nishaan (2005)
12. Chocolate (2005) (Cameo)
13. Dil Jo Bhi Kahey... (2005) (Cameo)
14. Ek Khiladi Ek Haseena (2005) (Cameo)
15. Fight Club – Members Only (2006) (Cameo)
16. Rafta Rafta – The Speed (2006) (Cameo)
17. Jaadu Sa Chal Gayaa (2006) (Cameo)
18. Big Brother (2007) (Cameo)
19. Journey Mumbai to Goa (2007)
20. Fun Aur Masti (2007)
21. Mere Dost Picture Abhi Baki Hai (2012)
22. Rowdy Rathore (2012)
23. Shortcut Romeo (2013)
24. Enemmy (2013)

=== Tamil ===
1. Majunu (2001) (Hari Gore song)
2. Boys (2003) (Dating song)
3. Jai (2004) (Cameo)
4. Thalai Nagaram (2006) (Cameo)
5. Vettaiyaadu Vilaiyaadu (2006) (Cameo)
6. Thalaimagan (2006) (Cameo)
7. Pokkiri (2007) (Cameo) in item song “En Chella Peru Apple”
8. Lee (2007) (Cameo)
9. Madurai Veeran (2007) (Cameo)
10. Parattai Engira Azhagu Sundaram (2007) (Cameo)
11. Marudhamalai (2007) (Cameo) as Jalaja
12. Nadigai (2008) (Cameo) (uncredited)
13. Villu (2009) (Cameo)
14. Brahmadeva (2009) (Cameo)
15. Kanthaswamy (2009) as Meenakumari (Cameo)
16. Kattradhu Kalavu (2010) (Cameo)
17. Pournami Nagam (2010) as Nagamani / Manasa
18. Siruthai as (2011) (Cameo)
19. Mambattiyan as Sornam (2011)
20. Arya Surya (2013) (Cameo)
21. Ragalaipuram (2013) (Cameo)

=== Kannada ===
1. Orata (2007) (Cameo)
2. Citizen (2008) (Cameo)
3. Raaj The Showman (2009)
4. Shourya (2010)
5. Rajadhani (2011) (Cameo)
6. Swayam Krushi (2011) (Cameo)
7. Dandupalya 4 (2019) (Cameo)

=== Bengali ===
1. Enemmy (2013)
2. Jole Jongole (2018) (Cameo)

=== Odia ===
1. Love Dot Com (2012) (Cameo)

=== Deccani ===
1. FM Fun Aur Masti (2007) (Cameo)

== Television ==
Year	Show	Role	Language	Channel	Result / Notes
2013	Jhalak Dikhhla Jaa 6	Herself	Hindi	Colors TV	Teen Ka Tadka along with Sana Saeed and Tushar
2017	Super 2	Herself	Telugu	ETV	
2017	Bigg Boss Telugu 1	Contestant	Telugu	Star Maa	8th place- Evicted on Day 49
2018	Sixth Sense	Herself	Telugu	Star Maa	
2018	Bigg Boss Telugu 2	Guest	Telugu	Star Maa	Support Performer for Roll Rida on Launch Night
2021	Dancee Plus	Judge	Telugu	Star Maa	
2021	Alitho Saradaga	Guest	Telugu	ETV	
2022	Bigg Boss Non Stop	Herself	Telugu	Star Maa	
2022–2023	Jhansi		Telugu	Disney+ Hotstar	

== Controversy ==
She was being investigated in a massive drug racket. She appeared before the special investigation team of Telangana Prohibition and Excise Department in Hyderabad which is probing the case. Many other actors were involved in it. After Investigation about this case by Special Investigation Team Mumaith Khan was given clean chit.
