= Pourudu =

- Film poster
- Directed by: Raj Aditya
- Written by: Raj Aditya; Marudhuri Raja (Dialogues)
- Produced by: Supriya Yarlagadda
- Starring: Sumanth; Kajal Aggarwal
- Cinematography: Sudhakar Reddy Yakkanti
- Edited by: Marthand K. Venkatesh
- Music by: Mani Sharma
- Production companies: SS Creations; Annapurna Studios (Presents)
- Release date: 13 January 2008
- Country: India
- Language: Telugu

Pourudu (transl. Citizen) is a 2008 Telugu language action thriller film written and directed by Raj Aditya. The film stars Sumanth and Kajal Aggarwal, while Suman, Nassar, Brahmanandam, Ali, Subbaraju, and Kota Srinivasa Rao play supporting roles. The film was produced by Sumanth's sister, Supriya, under the S.S. Creations banner. The music score was by Mani Sharma with cinematography by Sudhakar Yekkanti. The film released on 13 January 2008. It was a moderate success at the box office, having a run of 100 days in a couple of centers. The film was later dubbed into Hindi as Giraftaar: The Man on a Mission in 2008.

== Plot ==
Ajay completes his college degree and prepares for the IAS examination. His father Pandu works as a right hand under a powerful mafia leader named Jakeer Bhai. Kasi runs a rival gang in the same city along with his son. Though Pandu is a gangster, his son Ajay has different and more law-abiding aspirations. He concentrates on his studies and completes his IPS preliminaries. At the same time, he is a martial arts expert. Although he does not agree with his father's allegiance to Jakeer Bhai and the criminal world, he still loves him. Ajay and Samyukta, a student at a dance school, fall in love. At this juncture, Hussain takes charge as a CI and tries to nab Jakeer Bhai, Pandu, and Kasi. Unfortunately, he is not able to do so because of their political influence. In an ensuing conflict between Pandu and Kasi's son, the former's life is in danger. Knowing this, Ajay gets involved in the fight and saves his father. Hussain arrests both Pandu and Ajay subsequently. Pandu later learns that Jakeer Bhai is more evil than he is pretending to be and decides to leave him. Not liking this, Jakeer Bhai has Pandu killed by Kasi and his son. Jakeer Bhai wants to control the city, so he asks Ajay to kill Kasi and his son. Ajay then quits his ambition to become an IAS officer to avenge his father's death. In the end, he kills Jakeer Bhai. Hussain makes everyone believe that all those who are killed by Ajay died in a mafia gang war. He then helps Ajay attend the IAS main exams as he wishes. The film ends with the reunion of Samyukta and Ajay.

== Cast ==
- Sumanth as Ajay
- Kajal Aggarwal as Samyukta
- Suman as Pandu
- Nassar as Jakeer Bhai
- Brahmanandam as Church Father
- Ali as Madame Sir
- Subbaraju as Hussain
- Kota Srinivasa Rao as Kasi
- Dharmavarapu Subramanyam as Samyukta's father
- Pragathi as Samyukta's mother
- Raghu Babu as Mastan
- Srinivasa Reddy
- Sunil as Samyukta's prospective groom
- Ahuti Prasad
- Vamsi Krishna
- M. S. Narayana
- Suman Setty

== Soundtrack ==
Pourudu

Soundtrack album by Mani Sharma
- Released: 27 December 2007
- Recorded: 2007
- Genre: Film soundtrack
- Length: 26:44
- Label: Aditya Music
- Producer: Mani Sharma

Mani Sharma chronology
Sri Mahalakshmi (2007)	Pourudu (2007)	Ontari (2008)

The music launch of this film was done in a silent way at Annapurna studios on the night of 27 December 2007. ANR launched the audio and gave the cassette to D Rama Naidu. This function was held without any speeches. ANR, Nagarjuna, Sumanth, Kajal Agarwal, D Suresh Babu Kota, Suman, Akkineni Venkat attended this function.

The song "Nee Pakkanunte" was a remake of Sharma's previous song "Nee Mutham Ondru" from Pokkiri (2007), a remake of the Mahesh Babu-starrer 2006 film Pokiri, for which film Sharma himself was the music director.

Track-List
No.	Title	Lyrics	Artist(s)	Length
1.	"Chalre Chalre"	Bhaskarabhatla Ravi Kumar	Ranjith & Chorus	4:27
2.	"Nee Pakkanunte"	Ramajogayya Sastry	Hemachandra, Usha	4:51
3.	"Aamyamiya Aankh Maaro Miya"	Bhaskarabhatla Ravi Kumar	Suchitra	4:36
4.	"Andaalane Andistha"	Peddada Murthy	Rahul Nambiar, Rita	4:30
5.	"Salsa Idi Salsa"	Ramajogayya Sastry	Venu, Usha	4:13
6.	"Nee Pakkanunte" (Remix)	Ramajogayya Sastry	Hemachandra, Usha	4:07
Total length:				26:44

== Reception ==
Jeevi of idlebrain.com gave a review with a rating 3/5, stating "Though there are dialogues justifying the title Pourudu, it is a pure personal revenge story of a Koduku. On the whole, a better climax and good fight sequences make Pourudu an average flick." telugucinema.com gave a review of rating 3/5 stating "Pourudu is a regular action drama. Sumanth scores as actor but he is dogged down by the poor script. It fails to impress as its second half is too boring." Sify.com gave a review, stating "Sumanth, who proved his mettle for the first time onscreen with Satyam couldn't repeat the magic this time. As an action hero, he succeeds to a certain extend [sic], but the film is bogged down by the beaten to death plot line of a son taking avenge on the killers of his father." Rediff.com gave a review stating "Even though the film has an interesting premise (the tagline reads, 'when the system fails a power will rise, when that power fails, a man will rise'), it fails to live up to the expectations."
