= Kanchanamala Cable TV =

- Theatrical release poster
- Directed by: Pardha Sarathi
- Written by: Marudhuri Raja (dialogues)
- Produced by: Potluri Satyanarayana; K.V. Krishna Rao; P.V.V.S.N. Murthy (Presents)
- Starring: Srikanth; Lakshmi Rai
- Cinematography: Poorna
- Edited by: A. Sreekar Prasad
- Music by: K.M. Radha Krishnan
- Production company: Ramya Movies
- Release date: 15 July 2005
- Country: India
- Language: Telugu

Kanchanamala Cable TV is a 2005 Indian Telugu-language comedy film directed by Pardha Sarathi and starring Srikanth and newcomer Lakshmi Rai.

== Cast ==
- Srikanth as Sudarshan, the founder of Kanchanamala Cable TV in Juvvalapalem
- Lakshmi Rai as Sireesha, who pretends to be Sudarshan's nephew Kanchanamala
- Tanikella Bharani as the criminal lawyer
- Satyanarayana as Kanchanamala's father
- Annapurna as Kanchanamala's mother
- Sunil as Sudarshan's assistant
- Sivaji Raja as Sudarshan's assistant
- Preeti as Sudarshan's assistant
- Krishna Bhagavaan
- M. S. Narayana
- Raghu Babu
- Brahmanandam
- Ali
- Venu Madhav
- Kondavalasa
- Bandla Ganesh
- Sarika Ramachandra Rao
- Rama Lakshmanulu
- Harika
- Lavanya
- Deepanjali
- Manoja
- Allari Subhashini
- Rajitha
- Bharani as Criminal lawyer

== Production ==
Director Pardha Sarathi made his directorial debut with this film. The film was shot in Koduru and Poduru villages. The film's shoot was almost completed in June 2005.

== Soundtrack ==
Anand fame K.M. Radha Krishnan composed the film's songs. The lyrics were written by Chandrabose, Veturi and Sahithi. Three were shot near Palakol and two in Kerala. Hindustan Times called the soundtrack "an all-round album".

- "Kanchanamala" – Sandeep, Srikanth, Lalitha Sagar
- "Kantlo Kaaveri" – Karthik, Harini
- "Krishna Kolatalu" – Shankar Mahadevan, Kalpana
- "Nadiridinna" – Shankar Mahadevan, Kalpana
- "O Neelaveni" – SPB, Chitra
- "Saiyya Ante" – Lalitha Sagar

== Release ==
A critic from The Hindu opined that "The storyline is water thin but the director turns it into a neat film. One can happily watch with family". Jeevi of Idlebrain said that "On a whole Kanchanamala Cable TV disappoints". Sify said that "On the whole Kanchanamala Cable TV lacks story, logic and moves at snail pace". A critic from Webindia wrote that "Parthasarathy shows good taste in the visuals but he should understand that the plot is predominant and comedy cannot replace it".
