= Gajibiji =

- Poster
- Directed by: K. Vasu
- Written by: Sathyanand
- Produced by: K. Vasu
- Starring: Ali; Brahmanandam; Farjana; Krishna Bhagavaan; Kota Srinivasa Rao; Raghu Babu; Yeshwant
- Cinematography: B. Lokesh Rao
- Edited by: V. Nagi Reddy
- Music by: Vandemataram Srinivas
- Distributed by: Gayatri Arts
- Release date: 8 August 2008
- Country: India
- Language: Telugu

Gajibiji (transl. Confusion) is a 2008 Indian Telugu-language comedy film directed and produced by K. Vasu. Ali plays the lead role while Farjana, Venu Madhav, Brahmanandam, Krishna Bhagavaan, Kota Srinivasa Rao and Raghu Babu play supporting roles. This film released on 8 August 2008.

== Cast ==
- Ali as Munna
- Farjana
- Yeshwant
- Krishna Bhagavaan
- Venu Madhav as Chintu
- Brahmanandam
- M. S. Narayana as Pekata Papa Rao
- Kota Srinivasa Rao as Bhupati Raja and his step-brother
- Prabhakar as Prabhu
- M. Balayya
- AVS
- Raghu Babu
- Uttej
- Hema
- Gundu Hanumantha Rao
- Harsha Vardhan
- Chitram Srinu

== Production ==
The film has the tagline Choosthe kaani ardham kaadhu (transl. You won't understand unless you see it.).

== Soundtrack ==
The soundtrack was composed by Vandemataram Srinivas.

Track listing
No.	Title	Lyrics	Singer(s)	Length
1.	"Sakhiya Nee"	Jayasurya Bompem	Srinivas Varma, Pranavi	4:23
2.	"Pacha Janda"	Muni Sekhar	Srinivas Varma, Kousalya	5:02
3.	"Gajibiji"	Sagar Narayana	Srinivas Varma, Pranava Sesha Sai	3:57
4.	"Na Kanta Padindho"	J.N. Ramakrishna	Abhiram, Pranavi	4:14
5.	"Papam Pyta"	Jayasurya Bompem	Shilpa, Pranava Sesha Sai	4:42
Total length:				22:18
