= Krishnarjuna =

2008 film directed by P. Vasu

- Theatrical release poster
- Directed by: P. Vasu
- Written by: Marudhuri Raja (dialogues)
- Screenplay by: P. Vasu
- Story by: P. Vasu
- Produced by: Mohan Babu
- Starring: Nagarjuna Akkineni; Manchu Vishnu; Mamta Mohandas
- Cinematography: Om Prakash
- Edited by: Gautham Raju
- Music by: M. M. Keeravani
- Production company: Sree Lakshmi Prasanna Pictures
- Release date: 1 February 2008
- Running time: 154 minutes
- Country: India
- Language: Telugu

Krishnarjuna is a 2008 Indian Telugu-language fantasy comedy film produced by M.Mohan Babu on his Sri Lakshmi Prasanna Pictures banner and directed by P. Vasu, starring Nagarjuna Akkineni, Manchu Vishnu, and Mamta Mohandas. The music was composed by M. M. Keeravani. In the film, when Baba, an astrologer, claims that Satya's first husband will be killed, her brother, Pedababu, plans to get her married to the ill-treated orphan, Arjun. However, Lord Krishna comes to Arjun's rescue. The film is based on Bruce Almighty.

The film was a box-office failure.

== Plot ==
A mentally unstable pregnant woman runs inside a temple and closes the door. She gives birth to a boy at the feet of Lord Krishna's idol and breathes her last. The doors of the temple are closed, as people believe that the birth of such a woman's child in 'Gharbhagudi' is a bad omen. The boy, named Arjun, grows up under the guardianship of his grandmother. He goes to work as a bodyguard to Satya, the sister of landlord Pedababu. Arjun and his grandmother live in the outhouse of Pedababu's bungalow. Arjun is ill-treated by everyone. When an astrologer says that Satya's first husband will be killed and she will live happily with her second husband, Pedababu plans to get Satya married to Arjun first. Then, he conspires to kill him and get Satya married to a rich man. However, Lord Krishna comes to Arjun's assistance. Arjun gains some powers from his companionship with the Lord and overcomes the evils that threaten his peace and family life. He also succeeds in reopening the doors of the temple. Arjun then dies by jumping off a tall building because of his faith in Lord Krishna who revives him a minute after his death. The film ends on a happy note.

== Cast ==
- Nagarjuna Akkineni as Lord Krishna / Bangaram
- Manchu Vishnu as Arjun
- Mamta Mohandas as Sathya
- Mohan Babu as Baba
- Nassar as Pedababu
- Napoleon as Nallama Nayakkar
- Brahmanandam as Jyotish Brahmanandam Parmanandgaru
- Sunil as Arjun's sidekick
- Manorama as Arjun's grandmother
- Venu Madhav as Businessman
- Dev Gill
- P. Vasu
- Vamsi Krishna
- Mallikarjuna Rao
- Gundu Hanumantha Rao
- Tanikella Bharani
- Prema
- Bhuvaneswari
- Surekha Vani
- Srinivasa Reddy
- Giri Babu
- Raghu Babu
- M. S. Narayana
- Satyam Rajesh
- Uttej
- Suthi Velu
- Lakshmipati
- Ananth
- Kadambari Kiran
- Apoorva
- Poornima
- Srilalita
- Gayatri
- Master Akshay
- Baby Greeshma

== Music ==
Krishnarjuna

Film score by M. M. Keeravani
- Released: 2007
- Genre: Soundtrack
- Length: 34:01
- Label: 24 Frames Music
- Producer: M. M. Keeravani

M. M. Keeravani chronology
Pandurangadu (2008)	Krishnarjuna (2007)	Gunde Jhallumandi (2008)

The music was composed by M. M. Keeravani and was released by 24 Frames Music Company.

No.	Title	Lyrics	Singer(s)	Length
1.	"A A Aa E Ee"	Ramajogayya Sastry	Shankar Mahadevan	4:23
2.	"Aaja Mehabooba"	Sahithi	Achu, Geetha Madhuri	4:10
3.	"Buggalerrabada"	Sahithi	M. M. Keeravani, Mamta Mohandas	4:45
4.	"Yamaranjumeedha"	Gurukiran	Tippu, Sunitha	4:12
5.	"Thruvata Baba"	Jonnavithhula Ramalingeswara Rao	Tippu	4:18
6.	"Pedda Marrikemo"	Ramajogayya Sastry	Mano, Madhu Balakrishnan	4:32
7.	"Yedi Manchi"	Ramajogayya Sastry	Madhu Balakrishnan	4:30
8.	"We R Coming"	Ramajogayya Sastry	Pranavi, Bhargavi Pillai, Noel	3:11
Total length:				34:01

== Release ==
In 2016, the producers dubbed and released the film into the Tamil language as Rowdy Maappillai and dubbed into Hindi language as Rowdy Krishna by Wide Angel Media (WAM).

== Reception ==
A critic from Rediff.com rated the film two out of five stars and wrote that "In a nutshell, Krishnarjuna is neither serious nor entertaining." A critic from Full Hyderabad wrote that "Krishnarjuna steers clear of anything deep - and it looks incapability rather than design."
