= Bhookailas (2007 film) =

- Film poster
- Directed by: Siva Nageswara Rao
- Written by: Siva Nageshwara Rao; Nivas (Additional Screenplay)
- Produced by: B. Gurunatha Reddy; Narayana Reddy (Presenter)
- Starring: Venu Madhav; Suhasini
- Cinematography: Srinivas Reddy
- Edited by: K. Ramesh
- Music by: M. M. Keeravani; Rohit Raj
- Release date: 25 May 2007
- Country: India
- Language: Telugu

Bhookailas is a 2007 Indian Telugu-language film directed by Siva Nageswara Rao. The film stars Venu Madhav and Gowri Munjal. It is based on the real estate boom of Hyderabad.

Bhookailas was a commercial success at the box office.

== Plot ==
The film revolves around Kailasam, a hardworking man who lives with his family as a milk man. He is honest and sincere in his life. He delivers milk to people around the village.

Meanwhile, Bhuvaneswari owns a local toddy shop. People come here to drink regularly. One day her regulars ask for toddy, but instead of payment they offer their services. One promises that he'll stitch her blouse for free. Another man being a barber offers to shave her, irritated by this she slaps the man.

Confused, Bhuvaneswari wonders what he is up to. Meanwhile, few real estate agents come and make the people in village to sign with them. They get money quickly due to this and unable to handle the new found wealth they flaunt it. They have parties, massages, trips.

Later Kailasam helps a swami when he faints. The swami sees that Kailasam is no ordinary man and foretells him few things.

Kailasam then quickly finds out the real estate was not right and forces people to leave their own native place. He then fights the baddies saves the village and marries a hometown lover of his. And concludes by saying no more real estate related agonies.

== Cast ==
- Venu Madhav as Kailasam
- Suhasini
- Tanikella Bharani
- Brahmanandam
- Ali
- Sunil
- Rallapalli as Astrologer
- L. B. Sriram
- M. S. Narayana as Doctor
- Bhuvaneswari as Toddy Shop Owner
- Krishna Bhagavaan
- Jeeva
- Kota Srinivasa Rao
- Dharmavarapu Subramanyam
- Mallikarjuna Rao
- Jayaprakash Reddy
- Chalapathi Rao
- Shankar Melkote
- Raghu Babu as Patient
- Suman Shetty as Teen in toddy shop
- Kondavalasa Lakshmana Rao as Tailor
- Gundu Sudarshan
- Uttej as Newspaper seller
- Tirupathi Prakash as Driver
- Mumaith Khan (item number in "Venu Madhava")

== Production ==
The muhurat took place at Annapurna Studios on 21 January 2007 in the presence of Anushka Shetty, Ileana D' Cruz and Charmme Kaur.

== Soundtrack ==
The music was composed by M. M. Keeravani and Rohit Raj. The audio launch even took place on 6 May 2007 in Hyderabad.

Song No.	Song	Lyricist	Singer
1	"Bava Muripinchava"	Suddala Ashokteja	Murali, Priya
2	"Bhookailas" Title	Chandrabose	Vandemataram Srinivas
3	"Jana Bethedu"	Shiva Sakthi Datta	Malathi
4	"Nee Heithe"	Chandrabose	Jassie Gift, Suchitra
5	"Venu Madhava"	Chandrabose	M. M. Keeravani, Sunitha

== Reception ==
A critic from Sify wrote, "Despite fielding a popular comedian Venu Madhav, you have very little comedy offered here".
