= Punnami Naagu (2009 film) =

- Directed by: A. Kodandarami Reddy
- Screenplay by: A. Kodandarami Reddy
- Story by: Yandamuri Veerendranath
- Produced by: G. Vijay Kumar Goud
- Starring: Mumaith Khan
- Cinematography: P. N. Babu
- Edited by: Nandamuri Hari
- Music by: S. A. Rajkumar
- Production companies: Sound & Clap
- Release date: 10 April 2009
- Running time: 119 minutes
- Country: India
- Language: Telugu

Punnami Naagu (transl. Full moon Nāga) is a 2009 Indian Telugu-language female-centric horror film directed by A. Kodandarami Reddy. Mumaith Khan plays dual roles as a snakewoman and a model (city woman). The film was remade in Tamil as Pournami Nagam (2010).

== Cast ==
- Mumaith Khan as Nagamani, the female snake, Honey, a model
- Rajiv Kanakala
- Suhasini as Gangamma Lakshmi
- Nizhagal Ravi as Honey's father
- M. S. Narayana as Gangamma Lakshmi's uncle
- Srinivasa Reddy
- Nalini as Mayadevi Bhairavi
- Sajid Khan
- Delhi Ganesh as a priest
- Vinod Kumar Alva as a poacher
- Madhusudhan Rao as a poacher
- Manobala as SI Velangara Ramana Reddy
- Shankar Melkote as Dr. Pallalokam
- Aditya Om as the male snake dancer (special appearance)

== Production ==
Mumaith Khan plays a snake woman who believes in love and not revenge, and the people from the village think that her character is a devadasi. A childhood scene regarding Mumaith Khan's character was shot in Tamil Nadu.

== Soundtrack ==
Punnami Naagu

Soundtrack album by S. A. Rajkumar
- Released: 2009
- Genre: Feature film soundtrack
- Length: 22:04
- Language: Telugu
- Label: Aditya Music
- Producer: S. A. Rajkumar

S. A. Rajkumar chronology
Gorintaku (2008)	Punnami Naagu (2009)	Maa Annayya Bangaram (2010)
External audio
- Punnami Naagu – Jukebox on YouTube

The music is composed by S. A. Rajkumar. The film features a remix of "Ragulutondi" from Khaidi (1983) and also reuses archival footage from the said film.

Track listing
No.	Title	Lyrics	Singer(s)	Length
1.	"Boddu Kinda Cheera"	Bhaskarabhatla	Gayatri	4:48
2.	"Raguluthondi"	Abhinaya Srinivas	Ranjith, Suchitra	4:13
3.	"Ajare Ajare"	Kandikonda	S. A. Rajkumar, Suchitra	4:44
4.	"Om Namah Shivaya"	Siva Shakthi Datta	Gopika Poornima, Rahul	3:31
5.	"Poojinchey Punnami Nagu"	Siva Shakthi Datta	K. S. Chithra	4:48
Total length:				22:04

== Reception ==
Jeevi of Idlebrain.com gave the film a rating of one-and-a-half out of five and wrote that "[i]t is for the people who still want to see bhakti cinemas made on snakes". A critic from Bangalore Mirror wrote that "The story itself is pretty old-fashioned and sans logic".
