= Farzana (actress) =

Indian actress, choreographer and model

- Born: Mumbai, Maharashtra
- Occupations: Actress, choreographer, model
- Years active: 2006–2009

Farzana (born Farzana Barucha in Mumbai, Maharashtra, India) is an Indian actress, dance choreographer, and model. As an actress, she predominantly worked in Telugu films, notable among them being Bhagyalakshmi Bumper Draw (2006), Seema Sastri (2007), and Bommana Brothers Chandana Sisters (2008).

== Early life ==
Farzana is born and brought up in Mumbai in a Parsi family.

== Career ==
Farzana started her career as a professional dancer and choreographer. She has done choreography for many fashion shows and albums. As a choreographer, she worked with the stage shows of Adnan Sami. Her most notable choreography was for the title song of the 2006 Sanjay Dutt movie Zinda. Later on she became a professional model for brands including Hero Honda, Sansui, Godrej Hair Care, and Big Bazaar.

She was spotted by director Nidhi Prasad who signed her for a lead role in his movie Bhagyalakshmi Bumper Draw (2006), which was the Telugu remake of the Bollywood comedy film Malamaal Weekly (2006) written and directed by Priyadarshan. Having started a career in a comic movie she was typecast as a comedy film heroine.

Farzana has played the lead role in movies like Seema Sastri (2007), Bommana Brothers Chandana Sisters (2008), Gajibiji (2008), and Kuberulu (2008) all of which were comedy movies. She danced in the movie Mallepuvvu (2008) starring Muralikrishna and Bhumika Chawla.

In 2009 she entered the Tamil film industry and played the lead role in the film 1977 starring Sarath Kumar and Namitha.

Farzana is a nutrition expert, and enjoys adventure sports like paragliding, rock climbing and bungee jumping. She was a trainer for the sportswear company Reebok International Limited.

== Filmography ==
- Note: All films are in Telugu, unless otherwise noted.

Year	Film	Role	Notes
2006	Bhagyalakshmi Bumper Draw	Bhagyalakshmi	
2007	Seema Sastri	Surekha Reddy	
2008	Bommana Brothers Chandana Sisters	Siri Chandana	
2008	Gajibiji	Banker	
2008	Mallepuvvu	Herself	Special appearance
2008	Kuberulu	Dr. Kalpana	
2009	1977	Inba	Tamil film
2009	Soldiers		

=== Choreographer ===
Year	Film	Language	Notes
2006	Zinda	Hindi	
