= Sri Mahalakshmi =

- Theatrical release poster
- Directed by: Fightmaster Vijayan
- Written by: AK Sajan (story); Krishneswara Rao (dialogues)
- Produced by: Santhi Srihari
- Starring: Srihari; Shamna; Suhasini Mani Ratnam; Sayaji Shinde
- Cinematography: Vijay C. Kumar
- Edited by: Gautham Raju
- Music by: Mani Sharma
- Production company: Sri Chalana Chitra
- Distributed by: Sri Chalana Chitra
- Release date: 4 May 2007
- Country: India
- Language: Telugu

Sri Mahalakshmi is a 2007 Indian Telugu language thriller film written and directed by Fightmaster Vijayan starring Srihari and Shamna. The film is a remake of 2006 Malayalam film Chinthamani Kolacase starring Suresh Gopi and Bhavana.

== Plot ==
Lakshmi Krishna Devaraya aka LK, is a famous advocate, who always represents criminals and helps them win acquittal. However, LK believes that he was the envoy of God and implements the real justice after the court acquits his clients, by killing the accused in the name of cosmic justice. His sister always encourages him in every case. In fact, LK's parents committed suicide after not receiving justice in the court for the rape of their daughter, which motivated LK to be a vigilante. Sri Mahalakshmi, an MBBS student, is the daughter of a teacher Sambamurthy. She is killed by some nine NRI girls who call themselves as the Mirchi Girls. Their parents meet LK and urge him to save their children who were fixed in a murder case. LK makes a thorough research on the subject and gets the girls acquitted. During the trial it is proved that Sri Mahalakshmi is an adopted daughter. But in his personal inquiry, LK finds that the hostel matron Olga Rose Mary, medical college principal Bhogendra Bhalla and public prosecutor Janardhan were behind Sri Mahalakshmi's death. It is Janardhan and Bhalla who raped the girl which led to her death but imposed the case on the NRI girls. Finally LK implements the cosmic justice by killing all three of the accused to deliver justice to Sri Mahalakshmi and Sambamurthy.

== Cast ==
- Srihari as Lakshmi Krishna Devaraya "LK"
- Shamna as Sri Mahalakshmi, a college girl
- Suhasini as Rajyalakshmi, LK's sister
- Subbaraju
- Sayaji Shinde as Janardhan
- Thilakan as Sambamurthy, Sri Mahalakshmi's father
- Venu Madhav as Guddu Chandram
- Mumaith Khan
- Rallapalli
- Tanikella Bharani as Bavaji Rao
- Raghu Babu as Prakash
- Supreeth
- Shanoor Sana as Olga Rose Mary
- Ajay as Isra Qureshi
- Aishwarya
- Rajitha
- Raghu Kunche as Reporter
- Jeeva
- Waheeda Rehman as Waheeda Rehman, a Mirchi Girl

== Reception ==
Jeevi of Idlebrain.com wrote that " The title is a misnomer. We expect some women oriented issue in the film by looking at the title. But it is a pure suspense thriller. The plus points of the film are Srihari and screenplay. On the flipside, the movie would have been more appealing if they had done the right casting".
