= Yagna (film) =

2009 Kannada-language film

Yagna (ಯಜ್ನ)
- Directed by: Krishna Brahma
- Produced by: R Shankar
- Starring: Sriimurali; Priyanka
- Cinematography: A R Niranjan Babu
- Edited by: Govardhan
- Music by: Murali
- Release date: 17 April 2009
- Country: India
- Language: Kannada

Yagna (Kannada: ಯಜ್ನ) is a 2009 Indian Kannada-language film directed by Krishna Brahma, starring Sriimurali and Priyanka in the lead roles.

== Cast ==
- Sriimurali as Anji
- Priyanka as Yagna
- Sathya Prakash as Raj
- Jaya Prakash Reddy as Varadaraj
- Om Prakash Rao
- Venu Madhav
- M. S. Narayana

== Music ==
Yagna

Soundtrack album by Murali Krishna
- Released: 2009
- Recorded: 2009
- Genre: Feature film soundtrack
- Length: 20:22
- Language: Kannada

Official audio
- Yagna- Full Album on YouTube

Track listing
No.	Title	Singer(s)	Length
1.	"Mana Midiyuva"	Kunal Ganjawala, Sunitha Iyer	4:40
2.	"Dhum Idre Baaro"	Hemant Kumar, Sunitha Iyer	3:36
3.	"Ee Nayana"	Chaitra H. G.	4:05
4.	"Kogileye"	Karthik, Priyadarshini	4:01
5.	"Kanda Kshana"	M N Krupakar, Priyadarshini	4:00
Total length:			20:22

== Reception ==
=== Critical response ===
A critic from The New Indian Express wrote "The suspense begins when Yagna’s friends start getting killed one by one. Anji kills Raj, a dejected lover, who used to frighten the bungalow’s inmates In the climax, the director reveals that Anji is a police inspector who was assigned to investigate the mysterious deaths and Yagna is the owner of that bungalow. If you manage to sit through this film, it will be a miracle". A critic from Rediff.com scored the film at 1 out of 5 stars and says "Sree Murali once again proves that he is a good actor who unfortunately chooses the wrong films. He is good in the climax as well as in the fight sequences. Debutant Priyanka indulges in lot of skin show in the dance sequences. Om Prakash Rao's comedy gets to your nerves. Camera work of Niranjan Babu is passable while Sree Murali's music is very ordinary. All in all, a horror film you won't miss seeing". A critic from The Times of India scored the film at 2 out of 5 stars and wrote "While Srimurali has given his best, Priyanka is impressive. Omprakash Rao shines. Camerawork by Niranjan is poor. The less said the better about music by Murali". A critic from Bangalore Mirror wrote "Deaths ensue and Aaji has the task of finding out the cause. Like in most such films, the climax reveals that various characters are not what actually they were made out to be. Disconnect between scenes, virtual absence of characterisation and bad narration makes Yagna a torture to watch".
