= Kuberulu =

- DVD cover
- Directed by: Srinivasa Reddy
- Written by: Dasari Brahmam (dialogues)
- Screenplay by: Srinivasa Reddy
- Story by: Siva-Suresh
- Produced by: Karutoori Srinivas; Yaganti Srinivas
- Starring: Sivaji; Farzana; Kausha Rach; Krishna Bhagavaan; Ali
- Cinematography: Ram Pinisetti
- Edited by: Nagireddy
- Music by: Jeevan Thomas
- Production company: Godavari Talkies
- Release date: 5 December 2008
- Country: India
- Language: Telugu

Kuberulu is a 2008 Indian Telugu-language comedy film directed by Srinivasa Reddy and starring Sivaji, Farzana, Kausha Rach, Krishna Bhagavaan and Ali.

== Cast ==
- Sivaji as Siva Prasad
- Farzana as Kalpana
- Kausha Rach
- Krishna Bhagavaan as Rambabu
- Ali as Siva Prasad's friend
- Naramalli Sivaprasad as Don
- M. S. Narayana as Doctor
- Telangana Shakuntala as Bully
- Raghu Babu as Police inspector
- Jeeva
- Uttej
- Kondavalasa
- AVS
- L. B. Sriram
- Chalapathi Rao
- Narsing Yadav as Henchman
- Kavitha
- Hema
- Duvvasi Mohan
- Bhuvaneswari
- Rajitha
- Sravan as brother of Don
- Apoorva
- Sattanna
- Jyothi Lakshmi in a special appearance

== Production ==
Krishna Bhagavaan, a frequent collaborator with Srinivasa Reddy, stars in this film. Y. S. Rajasekhara Reddy launched the film's audio cassette. The film has the tagline Veellaku anni appule.

== Music ==
The soundtrack of the film was composed by Jeevan Thomas.

Track listing
No.	Title	Lyrics	Singer(s)	Length
1.	"Inti Numberenthane"	Bhaskarabhatla	Jassie Gift, Sunitha Upadrashta	4:08
2.	"Kalpanaa Kanule"	Bhaskarabhatla	S. P. Balasubrahmanyam, K. S. Chithra	4:22
3.	"Ankh"	Bhaskarabhatla	Sunitha Upadrashta, Viswa	3:24
4.	"Gudiyenaka"	Bhaskarabhatla	Malathi	3:36
5.	"Ittanti"	Bhaskarabhatla	Mano, Kalpana	4:16
Total length:				19:46

== Reception ==
Jeevi of Idlebrain.com said that "Director Srinivasa Reddy failed to capitalize on an interesting plot. The movie suffers from shabby direction and inept screenplay".
