= Veedu Mamoolodu Kadu =

Indian Telugu-language romantic drama film

- Poster
- Directed by: Ravi Sarma
- Written by: Madhusri (dialogues)
- Screenplay by: Ravi Sarma
- Story by: Ravi Sarma
- Produced by: Boddham Ashok Yadav
- Starring: Rishi; Gopika; Vijay Samrat
- Cinematography: Vasu
- Edited by: Nandamuri Hari
- Music by: S. A. Rajkumar
- Production company: Sri Dinesh Bros
- Distributed by: Sri Kalpana Arts
- Release date: February 2008
- Country: India
- Language: Telugu

Veedu Mamoolodu Kadu (transl. He is not an ordinary man) is a 2008 Indian Telugu-language romantic drama film directed by Ravi Sarma and starring Rishi, Gopika and Vijay Samrat. The film was dubbed in Malayalam as Rajamudra and was released to negative reviews. It marked Gopika's final Telugu film till date.

== Cast ==
- Rishi as Rishi
- Gopika as Swathi
- Vijay Samrat as Chakri
- MS Narayana as Chakri's uncle
- Ali as Anand
- Mallikarjuna Rao
- Lakshmipati
- AVS
- Charan
- Jogi Naidu as Rishi's friend
- Kallu Chidambaram as astrologer
- Kondavalasa as Science professor
- Babu Mohan as police inspector
- Chitti Babu as Swathi's grandfather
- Gundu Hanumantha Rao as priest
- Rekha as Lakshmi, Chakri's mother
- Sana as Swathi's mother
- Alapati Lakshmi as Swathi's grandmother
- Banda Jyothi
- Mumaith Khan as an item number in "Mysamma"
- Abhinayashree as Shalu

Guest appearances

- Suman as Swathi's father
- Bhanu Chander as Chakri's father
- Prasad Babu as Advocate

== Production ==
The film is a triangular love story between Rishi, Gopika and Vijay Samrat's characters. The film delves into the question of what makes a man perfect. Gopika signed the film in hopes that it will help solidify her Telugu film career. After the failure of his debut film Something Special (2006), Samrat rechristened himself as Vijay Samrat for the film.

== Soundtrack ==
The music was composed by S. A. Rajkumar.

- "Hai Hai"
- "Kamala Pandu"
- "Mysamma"
- "Prema Prema"
- "Tappuledu"

== Reception ==
A critic from Sify wrote, "the film is a pucca formulaic project, lacking creativity and even the minimum levels of convincement".
