= Uttej =

Indian actor and screenwriter

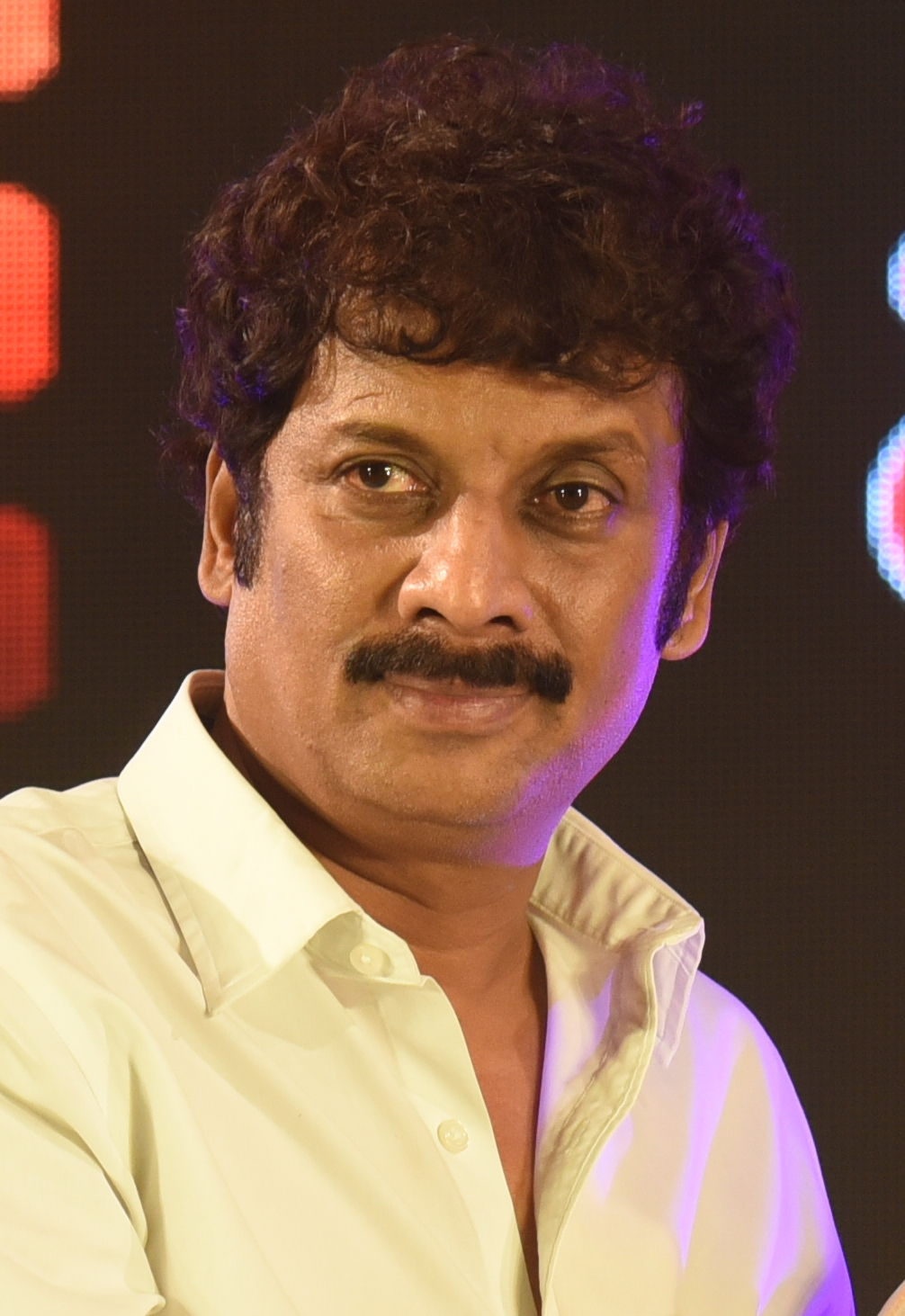
- Born: Nalgonda district, Telangana, India
- Occupations: Actor; screenwriter
- Years active: 1989-present
- Spouse: Padmavathi (died 2021)

Uttej is an Indian actor and screenwriter who works in Telugu cinema. He won the Nandi Award for Best Male Comedian for the film Chandamama (2007).

== Personal life ==
Uttej was born and brought up in Nalgonda district. He is the nephew of noted lyricist Suddala Ashok Teja.

Uttej married Padmavathi who died in September 2021 due to cancer.

== Career ==
Uttej started his career as an assistant director in Ram Gopal Varma's directorial debut Siva in 1989. He also played the role of canteen waiter in the film. He recommended J. D. Chakravathi to play antagonist role in Siva. He acted along with many lead actors and also worked as assistant director to Krishna Vamsi for the film Gulabi.

== Filmography ==
=== Telugu films ===
Key
†	Denotes films that have not yet been released

Year	Title	Role	Notes
1989	Siva	Yadagiri	Child artist
1990	Prema Khaidi		
1992	Prema Sikharam		
1993	Gaayam		
1993	Money		
1993	Preme Naa Pranam		
1994	Money Money		
1994	Govinda Govinda		
1995	Mister Mayagadu		
1995	Ammaleni Puttillu		
1995	Ooriki Monagadu		
1995	Rendu Krishnudu		
1996	Vinodam		
1996	Amma Nagamma		
1996	Merupu		
1996	Amma Durgamma		
1996	Ninne Pelladata		
1997	Master	Uttej	
1997	Ayyinda Leda	Compounder	
1997	Nayanamma		
1997	Preminchukundam Raa		
1997	Hitler		
1998	Abhishekam		
1998	Pape Naa Pranam		
1998	Andaru Herole		
1998	Peruleni Cinema		
1998	Srimathi Vellostha		
1998	Pelli Peetalu		
1998	Subbaraju Gari Kutumbam		
1999	Prema Kosam		
1999	A. K. 47	Ramu's friend	
1999	Seenu		
1999	Panchadara Chilaka		
1999	Harischandra		
1999	Nee Kosam		
2000	Annayya		
2000	Chitram		
2000	Suri		
2000	Badri		
2000	9 Nelalu		
2000	Manasichanu		
2000	Vijayaramaraju	Malik	Uncredited
2000	Uncle		
2001	Sorry Aunty		
2001	Chinna	Chandu's friend	
2001	Chandu		
2001	Daddy		
2001	Itlu Sravani Subramanyam		
2002	123	Thief Rangarayudu	Partially reshot version
2002	Khadgam		
2002	Tappu Chesi Pappu Koodu		
2003	Ottesi Cheputunna		
2003	Pellamto Panenti		
2003	Dongodu		
2004	Athade Oka Sainyam		
2005	786 Khaidi Premakatha		
2005	Dhairyam		
2005	Muddula Koduku	Venkat Rayudu	Partially reshot version
2005	Jai Chiranjeeva		
2006	Kithakithalu		
2006	Valliddari Vayasu Padahare	Car driver	
2006	Aadi Lakshmi		
2006	Rakhi		
2006	Annavaram		
2007	Takkari		
2007	Okkadunnadu	Constable b	
2007	Classmates		
2007	Bhookailas	Newspaper seller	
2007	Chirutha	Charan's colleague	
2007	Chandamama	Kondala Rao	
2008	Krishna		
2008	Andhariki Vandanalu		
2008	Nee Sukhame Ne Koruthunna		
2008	Gajibiji		
2008	Nenu Meeku Telusa		
2008	Jalsa		
2008	Black & White	Sreenu	
2008	Rainbow		
2008	Ninna Nedu Repu	Vamsi Krishna	Bilingual film
2008	Kuberulu		
2009	Drona		
2009	Bangaru Babu		
2009	Mahatma		
2009	A Aa E Ee		
2010	Maa Annayya Bangaram		
2010	Baava		
2010	Pappu - Mr Intelligent		
2011	Mangala		
2011	Dhada		
2012	Naa Ishtam		
2012	Mythri		
2013	Jabardasth		
2013	Shadow		
2013	Adhee Neevu Adhee Neenu		
2013	Mahankali	Rapist	
2014	Maine Pyar Kyia		
2014	Drushyam	Theatre operator	
2014	Power	Tiwari	
2015	Intelligent Idiots		
2015	Jyothi Lakshmi		
2015	Rudhramadevi		Cameo appearance
2016	Terror	Shiva	
2016	Manalo Okkadu		
2017	Khaidi No. 150		
2017	Aaradugula Bullet	Prabhu	
2018	Sri Harsha		
2018	Devadas	Raju	
2018	Taxiwaala	Doctor	
2018	Aghora	Doctor	
2018	Rahasyam	Doctor	
2019	Falaknuma Das	Peg Pandu	
2019	Manikanta Komarapu	Doctor	
2020	Pressure Cooker	Shiva Reddy	
2021	Love Story	Police inspector	
2021	Romantic	John	
2023	Bhola Shankar	Police officer	
2023	Devil: The British Secret Agent	Venkatachalam	
2024	Valari	Ramachandra	
2025	Nayanam	Gowrishankar	

=== Other language films ===
Year	Title	Role	Language	Notes
1990	Shiva	Yadagiri	Hindi	Child artist
2002	Durga		Hindi	
2008	Netru Indru Naalai	Vamsi Krishna	Tamil	Bilingual film
2016	Ilamai Oonjal	Harikrishnan	Tamil	Uncredited

=== As dialogue writer ===
Year	Title	Dialogue writer	Notes
1992	Raatri	Yes	
1995	Money Money	Yes	
1996	Ninne Pelladata	Additional	
2002	Khadgam	Yes	
2006	Rakhi	Additional	
2009	Mahatma	Additional	
2014	Power	Additional	
2015	Bengal Tiger	Additional	

=== As voice actor ===
Year	Actor	Film	Notes
2005	Vennela Kishore	Vennela	
2006	Vadivelu	Pogaru	Telugu dubbed version
2010	Santhanam	Nene Ambani	Telugu dubbed version
2011	Kumaravel	Gaganam	
