= Seema Sastri =

- Directed by: G. Nageswara Reddy
- Written by: Marudhuri Raja
- Screenplay by: Vegnesa Satish and Nivas
- Produced by: V. Jagadish
- Starring: Allari Naresh; Farjana; Ali; Krishna Bhagavan; M. S. Narayana
- Cinematography: S. Arun Kumar
- Edited by: K. Ramgopal Reddy
- Music by: Vandemataram Srinivas
- Distributed by: Sri Katyayani Creations
- Release date: 16 November 2007
- Country: India
- Language: Telugu
- Box office: ₹5 crore distributors' share

Seema Sastri is a 2007 Indian Telugu-language action comedy film directed by G. Nageswara Reddy. It stars Allari Naresh and Farjana. The film was released theatrically on 16 November 2007. It received mixed reviews from critics, who praised the humour, action sequences, and songs, but criticized the writing. It was later remade in Kannada as Super Shastri (2012). It was dubbed into Hindi as Guru Mahaguru.

Seema Sastri was a commercial success at the box office.

== Plot ==
Subramanyam Sastri falls in love with Surekha Reddy, who lives with her relatives in Hyderabad. After falling in love, Sastri gets to know that Surekha Reddy belongs to a popular factionist family in Rayala Seema. The rest of the story is all about how Subramanyam and his family members convince the factionists for the marriage in a humorous way.

== Cast ==
- Allari Naresh as Subramanya Sastry
- Farjana as Surekha Reddy
- Ali as Lambodhara Sastry
- Jaya Prakash Reddy as Peddi Reddy
- L. B. Sriram as Shankar Sastry
- Krishna Bhagavan
- M. S. Narayana as Vaikunta Sastry
- Brahmanandam as Panthulu
- Dharmavarapu Subramanyam
- A. V. S
- Kovai Sarala
- Vijaya Rangaraju as Laxma Reddy
- Raghu Babu as Gangi Reddy
- Bhuvaneswari as Neelambari
- Venu Madhav as Groom
- Master Bharath as Bharatha Simha Reddy
- Rajitha
- Mumaith Khan as Cameo appearance
- Chevella Ravi as Cameo (popularly known as Bithiri Sathi)
- Mallikarjuna Rao as Cameo

== Soundtrack ==
The soundtrack was composed by Vandemataram Srinivas and it contains 5 songs. Music of Allari Naresh's latest film Seema Sastri was launched at a function arranged in Kalinga Cultural center, Banjara Hills on the evening of 28 August. This function is attended by VV Vinayak, EVV, Rajasekhar, Jeevitha, Vishnu, Naresh, G Srinivasa Reddy, Chavali Ramanjaneyulu etc. EVV and Rajasekhar jointly released the audiocassette and gave the first unit to VV Vinayak. VV Vinayak and Vishnu jointly released the audio CD and gave the first unit to EVV.

- "Indha Andamaina" - Karthik
- "Manasa Vacha" - Karunya, Suchitra
- "Fida Fida" - Viswa, Pooja
- "Mancham Vesi" - Jassie Gift, Kalpana
- "Ichothane" - Tippu, Malathi

== Reviews ==
Idlebrain wrote:"If you can ignore illogical scenes and vulgarity, it is a decent comedy film that does not bore you". Telugucinema wrote:"Seema Shastry provides enough laughs and is good vasool for money. Despite some vulgar dialogues and illogical plotline and scenes, it gives entertainment". Fullhyderabad wrote:"Although Seema Sastry isn't the funniest movie ever made, it is worth a trip to the box office if you're in the mood for some lightweight timepass".

== Remake ==
It went on to be remade in Kannada as Super Shastri.
