= Maisamma IPS =

- Movie Poster
- Directed by: Bharath Parepalli
- Written by: Bharath Parepalli
- Produced by: Dasari Narayana Rao
- Starring: Mumaith Khan; Sayaji Shinde
- Cinematography: T. Surendra Reddy
- Music by: M. M. Srilekha
- Production company: Sri Balaji Movies
- Release date: 23 November 2007
- Running time: 2 hours 30 mins
- Country: India
- Language: Telugu

Maisamma IPS is a 2007 Indian Telugu-language film starring Mumaith Khan and Sayaji Shinde in lead roles. This film is about a strict police-woman, who is a people's defender, since the law is unable to do justice to them. The film's story is written by director Dasari Narayana Rao and is directed by Bharath Parepalli. All the stunts in the film were performed by Khan herself.

== Plot ==
A girl child is born to a helpless mother when the jatara (a public religious festival) of goddess Maisamma is going on in Telangana village. The child is named as Maisamma. Her parents are killed in a natural calamity. The child is taken care of by her sister Durga. A small-time rowdy Sadhu (Sayaji Shinde) marries Durga and forces her to do prostitution for his political ambitions. At one stage, the rowdy tries to rape minor girl Maisamma. While both sister run for their life, Sadhu prompts his dogs to kill his wife Durga, while Maisamma escapes. She later becomes a police officer Maissamma IPS (Mumaith Khan). She lives for one goal to kill those who are responsible for her sister's miserable life followed by her death. Then she kills everyone who was responsible for her sister's death. She uses many getups to do it, including using a cowherd getup to kill the minister. She also masters kungfu and karate.

== Cast ==
- Mumaith Khan as Maisamma IPS
- Sayaji Shinde as Minister Sadhu
- Ranjitha as Durga
- Pradeep Rawat as Khan Bhaiyya
- Raghu Babu as Sadhu's brother-in-law
- Jeeva as Corrupted Policeman
- M. S. Narayana as Minister
- L. B. Sriram as Constable Basha
- Shankar Melkote as Judge
- Satyaprakash
- ETV Prabhakar

== Music ==
- "Chup Saala" - M. M. Srilekha, Viswa
- "Bajjomante" - Ganga
- "Maisamma" - S. P. Balasubrahmanyam
- "Gandara Gandabie" - Deepu, Kalpana Patowary
- "Mathrudevobhava" - M. M. Srilekha
- "Naa Peru Mumaith Khan" - Suchitra

== Reception ==
Rediff wrote that "Stay away from the film unless you want to spoil your day". Sify gave the film a verdict of "Avoidable".
