= Bommana Brothers Chandana Sisters =

- Directed by: Srinivasa Reddy
- Produced by: Ammiraju Kanumilli
- Starring: Allari Naresh; Krishna Bhagavaan; Farjana; Charulatha; Kota Srinivasa Rao
- Cinematography: Adusumilli Vijaykumar
- Edited by: Marthand K. Venkatesh
- Music by: M. M. Srilekha
- Distributed by: Siri Cinema
- Release date: 18 April 2008
- Country: India
- Language: Telugu

Bommana Brothers Chandana Sisters is a 2008 Indian Telugu comedy drama film directed by Srinivasa Reddy starring Allari Naresh, Krishna Bhagavaan, Farjana, Charulatha, Raghu Babu, Suman Shetty and Kota Srinivasa Rao in the lead roles. M. M. Srilekha scored the music. The movie was released on 18 April 2008.

== Plot ==
The Bommana brothers (Ramachandran, Tulasi Ram) and their parents are thieves. Once, these Bommana brothers rob a bank manager. Eventually they get caught by the police and escape from the police too with the help of their father. Then, they accidentally look at the photograph of two sisters and gather information about them. They are Siri Chandana and Mani Chandana (Chandana sisters), the daughters of Mohan Rao, the owner of popular cloth business chain.

Siri is faithful to God, while Mani always extends her helping hand to orphans and challenged. The brothers change their attires and dupe both Mani and Siri and win their hearts. After a few twists, the brothers marry the Chandana sisters. Later, the brothers play some more tricks and bequeath the property of their father-in-law. However, Mohana Rao discovers that they are cheats and became a madman. This irks Mani and Siri, who meet a professional killer to murder their husbands. Before that, the brothers realize their mistake and try to reach the sisters to hand over the documents. After a fight with all the villains, the brothers hand over those documents and regain their faith. The movie ends with Mohan Rao entering sound mind and the brothers leading an honest life.

== Cast ==
- Allari Naresh as Ramachandran
- Krishna Bhagavaan as Tulasi Ram
- Farjana as Siri Chandana
- Charulatha as Mani Chandana
- Tanikella Bharani as the Bommana brothers' father
- Kovai Sarala as the Bommana brothers' mother
- Kota Srinivasa Rao as Mohan Rao
- Rajitha as Kanakam
- Dharmavarapu Subramanyam as Bank manager
- Raghu Babu as Professional killer
- Suman Setty as Servant
- Satyam Rajesh as Satyam
- L. B. Sriram as Police inspector
- Jeeva
- Kadambari Kiran
- Gemini Suresh
- Visweswara Rao as Store worker

== Soundtrack ==
Bommana Brothers Chandana Sisters

Soundtrack album
- Released: 12 Mar 2008
- Recorded: 2008
- Genre: Feature film soundtrack
- Length: 21:00
- Language: Telugu
- Label: Supreme Music

The music was composed by M. M. Srilekha and all lyrics were penned by Bhaskarabhatla.

No.	Title	Artist(s)	Length
1.	"Visakhapatnam"	Sujith, M.M. Srilekha	04:08
2.	"Poddunnemo Osari"	Sweta, Karthik	05:00
3.	"Yama Yamaga"	Tippu, Kalpana Patowary	04:41
4.	"Vaanosthe Varshakalam"	Karthik, Kousalya	03:51
5.	"Nenu Ready"	Jassie Gift, Malathy	03:20
Total length:			21:00

== Reception ==
The movie got positive reviews. CineGoer.com gave a review of rating 3/5 stating "Pucca Comedy, Paisa Vasool for a number of reasons but just as highly forgettable. It really does beat the heat and the time flies by quickly till it gets to a done-to-death climax." Sify.com gave a review stating "This is a mass entertainer without any boring elements. Comedy is the lifeline of the film and Srinivasa Reddy succeeded in giving a good treat. Stretched out screenplay and dramatic narration are minus points. It can pass off just as an average film."
