= Kousalya (singer) =

Indian playback singer

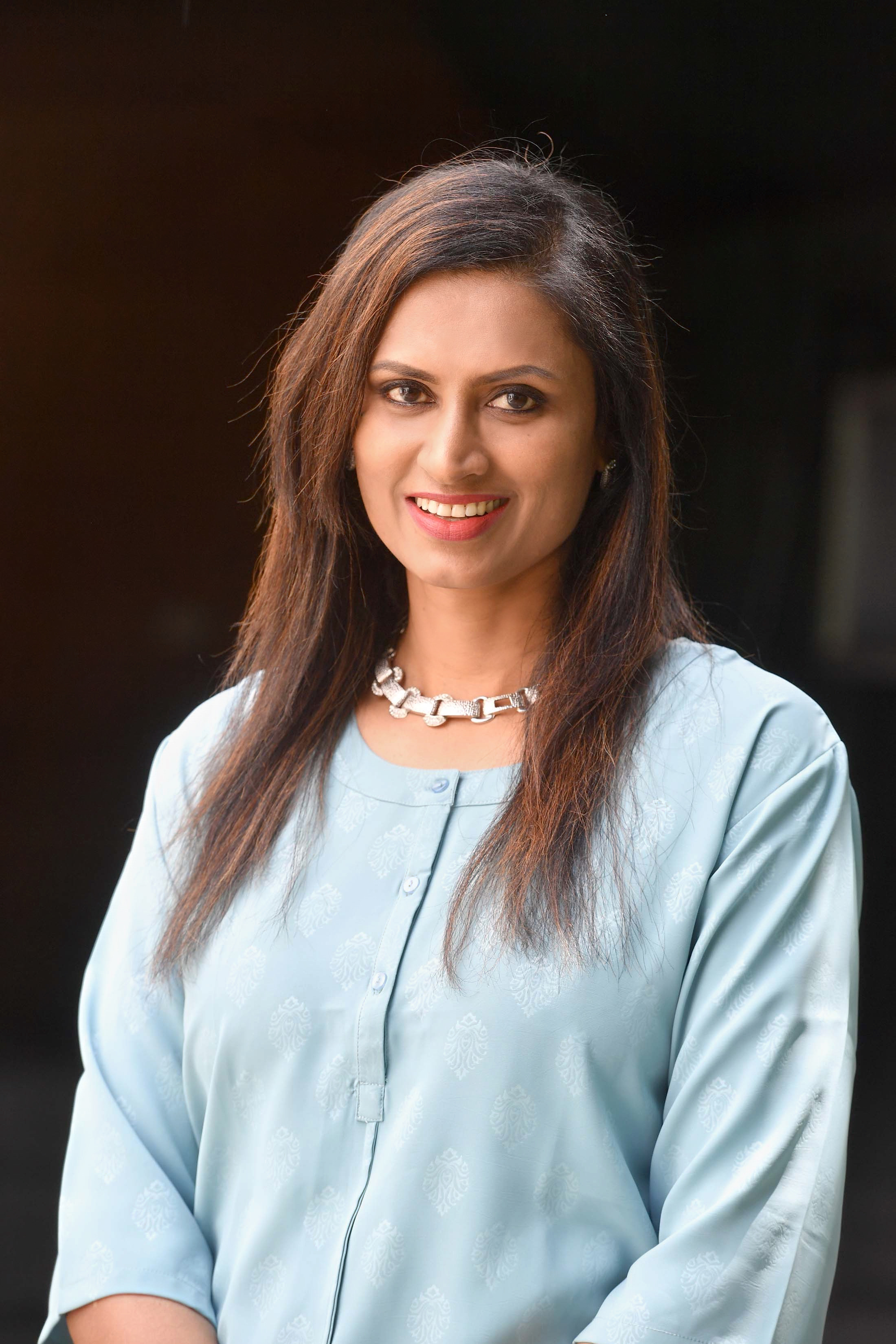

Background information
- Origin: Guntur, Andhra Pradesh, India
- Occupations: singer, composer, dubbing artist
- Years active: 1999–present

Kousalya is a playback singer and Music Composer from South Indian Cinema. Did her Masters and PhD in Carnatic Music. Started playback singing career in the year 1999 with Telugu movie Nee Kosam, music scored by R.P.Patnaik. She rendered more than 400 songs for Telugu, Tamil and Kannada films.

== Career ==
She started playback singing in the year 1999 with the Telugu movie Nee Kosam, music scored by R.P.Patnaik.

Kousalya rendered her voice for dubbing in three movies, Sravanamasam for heroine Kalyani, Bakara for heroine Yashika and "Cheekati Rajyam" for Kamalhassan's wife character. She composed " Sri Annamayya Sankeerthana Sudha " with four new Keerthanas released by Aditya Music. She won 3 Nandi Awards as a Best Playback Singer where one for own composition on Etv Adade Adharam, daily serial.

== Playback singing ==
Bangarukonda, Nee Kosam, Chitram, Idiot, Itlu Sravani Subramaniam, Nuvvu Leka Nenu Lenu, Avunu Valliddaru Ishtapaddaru, Shivamani, Amma Nanna O Tamil Ammai, Gangotri, Devadasu, Satyam, Adirindayya Chandram, Desamuduru, Kabaddi Kabaddi, Chenna Kesava Reddy, Chakram, Nuvve-Nuvve, Ninne Ishtapaddanu, Narasimhudu, Shock, Sravanamasam, Dhee, Pelli Kani Prasad, Godava, Dubai Srinu, Nagaram, Takkari, Satyabhama, Krishna, Maska, Neninthe, Vengamamba, Mithrudu, Gopi Gopika Godavari, Mayagadu Brahmalokam to yamalokam via Bhulokam, Simha, Golimar, Saradaga Kasepu, Ranga the Donga, Emaindi evela, Poola Rangadu, Srimannarayana, Shiridi Sai,Vijetha,Chinni Chinni Asha, Kiss, Thanu Monne Vellipoyindi,Veta, Dictator, Soggade Chinni Nayana. Tupaki Ramudu. Title Song for Siri daily serial

=== TV and stage shows ===
- Final winner of Padutha Theeyaga hosted by Sri SP Balasubrahmanyam garu on ETV.
- Hosted Sye Singers Challenge on ETV, which was to give break for new talents in singing in 2006.
- Worked as a judge along with music director Koti & lyricist Bhuvana Chandra on Zee Telugu channel Sarigamapa Little Champs 2009.
- Composed Music & sung the Title songs of Sye Singers Challenge, Aadade Aadhaaram & Hrudayam daily serials running on ETV.
- Judge cum team leader in Super Singers 7 Presented by Airtel on Maa TV.

== Awards ==
- Nandi Award for Endamaavulu ETV Serial’s title song in the year 2002.
- Nandi Award for "Gundelona" song from Satyabhama movie 2007.
- Nandi Award for Adade Adharam title song as a Best Playback Singer 2011
- Delhi Telugu Academy Television Award for the title songs of Siri (DD) & Endamaavulu (ETV) in the year 2004.
- Ugadi Puraskar 2003 & 2006 as Best Playback Singer for Avunu Valliddaru Ishtapaddaru & Shivamani.
- Bagged Gold Medal in National level solo singing at NCC Republic Day Camp-1992 in New Delhi.
- Cinegoer Award as Best Playback Singer-Female for the years 2002, 2005, and 2006, 2008.
- 2013 TSR-TV9 National Film Awards for the song "Om Sai" from Shiridi Sai.
- MAA TV award for Adade Adharam.
- Santhosham Magazine Awards Best Playback Singer – Female – for the years 2003, 2007 and 2009.
- Cine Maa Award from Maa TV Best Playback Singer – Female – for the year 2004 and 2005.
- ETV Internnal Awards as Best Playback Singer-Female for the years 2006 and 2007.
- Big Ugadi Award as Best Female Singer Of The Year - 2009 for the song "Nuvvakkadunte- Nenikkadunte" from Gopi Gopika Godavari.
- Alapana Music Award for the song "Nuvvakkadunte- Nenikkadunte" from Gopi Gopika Godavari in 2009.
- MAA TV TEA (Television Entertainment Awards) for Adade Adharam title song in 2012.
- Cinegoer Award for Adade Adharam Serial Song as Best Composer.
- T.Chalapathi Rao Award and Title Gandharva Ranjani presented by Pragnika Arts, November 2018.
- Dr SP Balasubrahmanyam Janmdina Puraskaram by Sruthi Laya Arts, 2019
- P.Leela Sangeetha Puraskaram 2019 by Thrushna Sangeetha Samskruthika Samstha.
- Naari Sakthi 2021 “Women of the decade” Women’s Day Award by Vvogues
