= Kajal Aggarwal filmography =

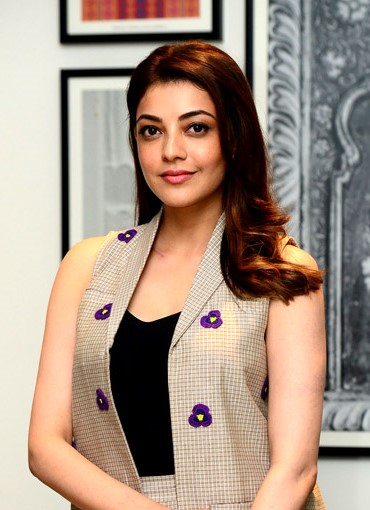
Aggarwal at an event in 2018

Kajal Aggarwal is an Indian actress who primarily appears in Telugu, Tamil and Hindi films. She made her debut with a minor role in the Hindi film Kyun! Ho Gaya Na... (2004). Aggarwal debuted in Telugu cinema with Lakshmi Kalyanam (2007), and was a box office failure. The year's other Telugu film, Chandamama, became a commercial success. Her first Tamil release Pazhani came the following year.

The next year, she had four releases. One of them, S. S. Rajamouli's Telugu film Magadheera - became a major breakthrough for her, and earned her a Filmfare Award for Best Actress – Telugu nomination. Aggarwal's first release of 2010 was the romantic comedy Darling, which became a commercial success at the box office, and earned her another Filmfare nomination for Best Actress in Telugu. Her other two releases of the year — the Tamil thriller Naan Mahaan Alla and the romantic comedy Brindavanam - were also successful, with the latter fetching her the CineMAA Award for Best Actress. In 2011, she appeared in Mr. Perfect, which earned her a third Filmfare nomination for Best Actress in Telugu. In the same year, she starred in the Hindi film Singham, a remake of the 2010 Tamil film Singam and she received a Filmfare Award for Best Female Debut nomination. Aggarwal's performance in AR Murugadoss' Thuppakki (2012) won her the CineMAA Award for Best Tamil Actress, and Govindudu Andarivadele (2014) earned her a fourth Filmfare nomination for Best Telugu Actress. She made her television debut with the Tamil-language streaming series Live Telecast (2021).

== Films ==
Key
| † | Denotes films that have not yet been released |

| Year | Title | Role | Language | Notes | Ref. |
|---|---|---|---|---|---|
| 2004 | Kyun! Ho Gaya Na... | Diya's sister | Hindi | Minor role | |
| 2007 | Lakshmi Kalyanam | Lakshmi | Telugu | Debut in a lead role | |
| 2007 | Chandamama | Maha Lakshmi | Telugu | | |
| 2008 | Pourudu | Samyukhta | Telugu | | |
| 2008 | Aatadista | Sunanda | Telugu | | |
| 2008 | Pazhani | Deepthi | Tamil | | |
| 2008 | Saroja | Pooja | Tamil | Cameo | |
| 2008 | Bommalattam | Anitha | Tamil | | |
| 2009 | Modhi Vilayadu | Easwari Lakshmi Ram | Tamil | | |
| 2009 | Magadheera | Yuvaraani Mithravindha Devi / Indira Indu’ (Note: Aggarwal played one character (Mithravindha) who is reincarnated (as Indira).) | Telugu | | |
| 2009 | Ganesh | Divya | Telugu | | |
| 2009 | Arya 2 | Geethanjali | Telugu | | |
| 2010 | Om Shanti | Meghana | Telugu | | |
| 2010 | Darling | Nandini | Telugu | | |
| 2010 | Brindavanam | Bhumi | Telugu | | |
| 2010 | Naan Mahaan Alla | Priya Sudharsan | Tamil | | |
| 2011 | Singham | Kaavya Bhosle | Hindi | | |
| 2011 | Mr. Perfect | Priya/Ammulu | Telugu | credited as Kajal | |
| 2011 | Veera | Chitra | Telugu | | |
| 2011 | Dhada | Rhea | Telugu | | |
| 2012 | Businessman | Chitra Bhardwaj | Telugu | | |
| 2012 | Sarocharu | Sandhya | Telugu | | |
| 2012 | Maattrraan | Anjali Akhilan | Tamil | | |
| 2012 | Thuppakki | Nisha | Tamil | | |
| 2013 | Naayak | Madhu | Telugu | | |
| 2013 | Baadshah | Janaki | Telugu | | |
| 2013 | Special 26 | Priya Chauhan | Hindi | | |
| 2013 | All in All Azhagu Raja | Chithra Devi Priya | Tamil | | |
| 2014 | Jilla | Shanthi | Tamil | | |
| 2014 | Yevadu | Deepti | Telugu | Cameo | |
| 2014 | Govindudu Andarivadele | Satya | Telugu | | |
| 2015 | Temper | Shanvi | Telugu | credited as Kajal | |
| 2015 | Size Zero | Herself | Telugu | Guest appearance; Bilingual film | |
| 2015 | Inji Iduppazhagi | Herself | Tamil | Guest appearance; Bilingual film | |
| 2015 | Maari | Sri Devi | Tamil | | |
| 2015 | Paayum Puli | Sowmya | Tamil | | |
| 2016 | Sardaar Gabbar Singh | Arshi Devi | Telugu | | |
| 2016 | Brahmotsavam | Kasi Annapurna | Telugu | | |
| 2016 | Janatha Garage | Herself | Telugu | Special appearance in the song "Pakka Local" | |
| 2016 | Do Lafzon Ki Kahani | Dr. Jenny Mathias | Hindi | | |
| 2016 | Final Cut of Director | Anitha | Hindi | | |
| 2016 | Kavalai Vendam | Divya Priyadharshini | Tamil | | |
| 2017 | Vivegam | Yazhini Ajay Kumar | Tamil | | |
| 2017 | Mersal | Anu Pallavi | Tamil | | |
| 2017 | Khaidi No. 150 | Lakshmi | Telugu | | |
| 2017 | Nene Raju Nene Mantri | Radha Jogendra | Telugu | | |
| 2018 | Awe | Kali | Telugu | | |
| 2018 | MLA | Indu | Telugu | | |
| 2018 | Kavacham | Samyuktha Chaganti | Telugu | | |
| 2019 | Sita | V. Sita Maha Lakshmi | Telugu | | |
| 2019 | Ranarangam | Geetha | Telugu | | |
| 2019 | Comali | Rithika Mohan | Tamil | | |
| 2021 | Mumbai Saga | Seema Rao Naik | Hindi | | |
| 2021 | Mosagallu | Anu Mukund | Telugu | | |
| 2022 | Hey Sinamika | Dr. Malarvizhi | Tamil | | |
| 2023 | Ghosty | Aarthi | Tamil | | |
| 2023 | Karungaapiyam | Karthika | Tamil | | |
| 2023 | Bhagavanth Kesari | Dr. Kathyayani | Telugu | | |
| 2024 | Satyabhama | Satyabhama "Satya" IPS | Telugu | | |
| 2024 | Indian 2 | Dakshayini | Tamil | Cameo | |
| 2025 | Sikandar | Vaidehi Rangachari | Hindi | | |
| 2025 | Kannappa | Goddess Gnana Prasonnambika (Parvati) | Telugu | Guest appearance | |
| 2026 | The India Story | Archana Patil | Hindi | | |
| 2026 | Ramayana: Part 1 | Mandodari | Hindi | | |
| 2026 | Dada † | TBA | Telugu | Completed | |
| 2027 | Indian 3 † | Dakshayini | Tamil | Completed | |
| 2028 | Ramayana: Part 2 † | Mandodari | Hindi | Filming | |

== Television ==
| Year | Title | Role | Language | Ref. |
|---|---|---|---|---|
| 2021 | Live Telecast | Jennifer "Jenny" Matthew | Tamil | |

== Discography ==
| Year | Film | Song | Language | Composer | Ref. |
|---|---|---|---|---|---|
| 2016 | Chakravyuha | "Yenaithu" | Kannada | S. Thaman | |
