= List of awards and nominations received by Kajal Aggarwal =

Kajal Aggarwal awards and nominations
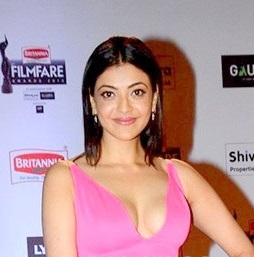
- Aggarwal at the 61st Filmfare Awards in 2016
Awards and nominations
Award	Wins	Nominations
Filmfare Awards South	1	5
Filmfare Awards	0	1
SIIMA Awards	3	8
CineMAA Awards	2	4
Vijay Awards	1	2
Cosmopolitan Awards	1	1
Edison Awards (India)	1	2
Zee Telugu Apsara Awards	7	7

Totals (Note: Certain award groups do not simply award one winner. They acknowledge several different recipients, have runners-up, and have third place. Since this is a specific recognition and is different from losing an award, runner-up mentions are considered wins in this award tally. For simplification and to avoid errors, each award in this list has been presumed to have had a prior nomination.)
- Wins: 16
- Nominations: 29

Kajal Aggarwal is an Indian actress who predominantly works in Tamil, Telugu and Hindi films. She is a recipient of many awards including three South Indian International Movie Awards along with four Filmfare Awards South nominations. This article lists awards received by her.

== Filmfare Awards South ==
The Filmfare Awards South is the South Indian segment of the annual Filmfare Awards, presented by The Times Group to honour artistic and technical excellence of professionals in the South Indian film industry.

Nominated

- 2009 – Filmfare Award for Best Actress – Telugu for Magadheera
- 2010 – Filmfare Award for Best Actress – Telugu for Darling
- 2011 – Filmfare Award for Best Actress – Telugu for Mr. Perfect
- 2014 – Filmfare Award for Best Actress – Telugu for Govindudu Andarivadele

Winner

- 2024 — Filmfare Critics Award for Best Actress – Telugu: for Satyabhama

== Filmfare Awards ==
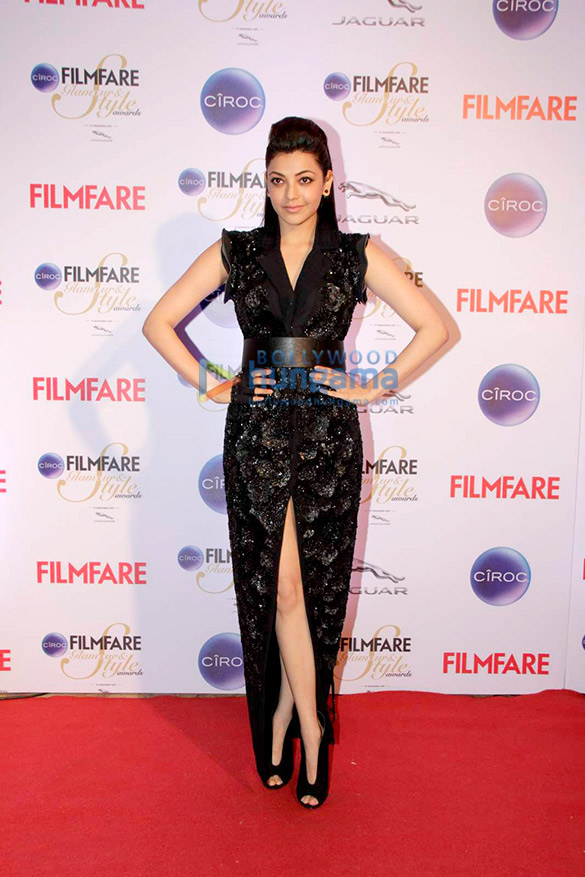
Aggarwal at Filmfare Glamour & Style Awards in 2015

Nominated

- 2012 – Filmfare Award for Best Female Debut – Hindi for Singham

== South Indian International Movie Awards ==
South Indian International Movie Awards
Year	Category	Film	Result	Ref.
2012	SIIMA Award for Best Actress (Telugu)	Mr. Perfect	Nominated	
2013	SIIMA Award for Best Actress (Critics) – Tamil	Thuppakki	Won	
2013	Youth Icon of South Indian Cinema		Won	
2013	SIIMA Award for Best Actress (Telugu)	Businessman	Nominated	
2013	SIIMA Award for Best Actress (Tamil)	Thuppakki	Nominated	
2014	SIIMA Award for Best Actress (Telugu)	Baadshah	Nominated	
2015	SIIMA Award for Best Actress (Telugu)	Govindudu Andarivadele	Nominated	
2018	SIIMA Award for Best Actress – Telugu	Nene Raju Nene Mantri	Won	

== CineMAA Awards ==
The CineMAA Awards are presented annually by the Movie Artists Association Group to honour artistic and technical excellence of professionals in the Telugu Cinema.
Winner

- 2011 – CineMAA Award for Best Actress – Telugu for Brindaavanam (2010)
- 2013 – CineMAA Award for Best Actress – Tamil for Thuppakki (2012)

Nominations

- 2010 – CineMAA Award for Best Actress – Telugu for Magadheera (2009)
- 2012 – CineMAA Award for Best Actress – Telugu for Mr. Perfect (2011)

== Vijay Awards ==
Vijay Awards are given by the Tamil television channel STAR Vijay.

Winner

- Vijay Award for Favourite Heroine – For Thuppakki (2012)

Nominated

- Vijay Award for Best Actress – For Thuppakki (2012)

== Cosmopolitan Awards ==
Awards given by Cosmopolitan magazine.

- Winner – Cosmopolitan People Choice Award for Best Actress – Thuppakki

== Edison Awards ==
- Nominated The Gorgeous Belle – For Maari (2015)
- Winner The Gorgeous Belle of the year (2016)

== Zee Telugu Apsara Awards 2016 ==
- Winner – Fashion Icon of the year & Most Popular Female celebrity on Social Media
- Winner – Femina Penn Shakti Awards 2013
- Winner – Femina Power List South 2016
- Winner – Zee Telugu Golden Awards 2017 Best Actress
- Winner – Hyderabad Times Most Desirable Women 2016

== Zee Telugu Cine Awards 2018 ==
- Winner – Actress of the Decade
- Winner – Best Actress in 2017
