= G. Eshwar Reddy =

Indian film director

- Born: Nidamanoor, Andhra Pradesh, India
- Occupation: Film director
- Years active: 2008–present

G. Eshwar Reddy is an Indian film director known for his work in Telugu cinema.

== Career ==
Eshwar Reddy started his career as an assistant director under E. V. V. Satyanarayana. G. Eshwar Reddy made his directorial debut with Siddu from Sikakulam before directing Seeta Ramula Kalyanam Lankalo. He later directed Ramachari staring Venu Thottempudi and Kamalinee Mukherjee, and Selfie Raja.

== Filmography ==
| Year | Film | Director | Writer | Notes |
|---|---|---|---|---|
| 2008 | Siddu from Sikakulam | Yes | Yes | |
| 2010 | Seeta Ramula Kalyanam Lankalo | Yes | Yes | |
| 2013 | Ramachari | Yes | Screenplay | |
| 2016 | Selfie Raja | Yes | Story | |
| 2026 | Kannappa | No | Yes | |
