= N. C. Karunya =

Indian playback singer

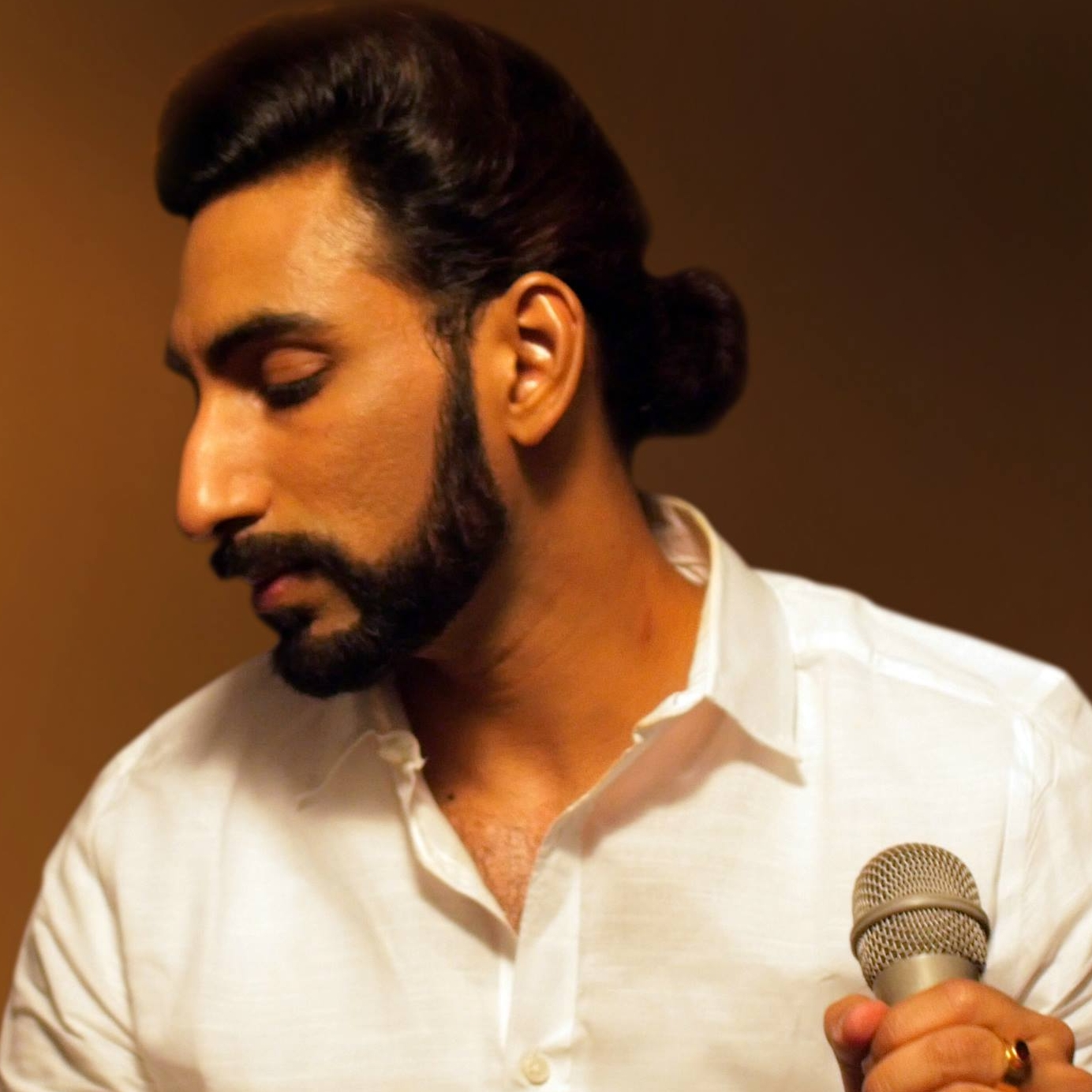
- Karunya's Single "O Priyathamaa" Poster.

Background information
- Born: 1 March 1986 (age 40)
- Origin: Hyderabad, Telangana, India
- Occupations: Singer, Songwriter, TV host
- Years active: 2006 – present

N. C. Karunya is an Indian playback singer, stage performer, YouTuber, songwriter, and TV show host known for his works primarily in Telugu and Hindi films. He has won the Filmfare Award for Best Male Playback Singer – Telugu for the song "Sada Siva Sanyasi" from the 2010 film Khaleja.

Following Indian Idol 2, Karunya was called for an audition by Vidhu Vinod Chopra for Lage Raho Munna Bhai.

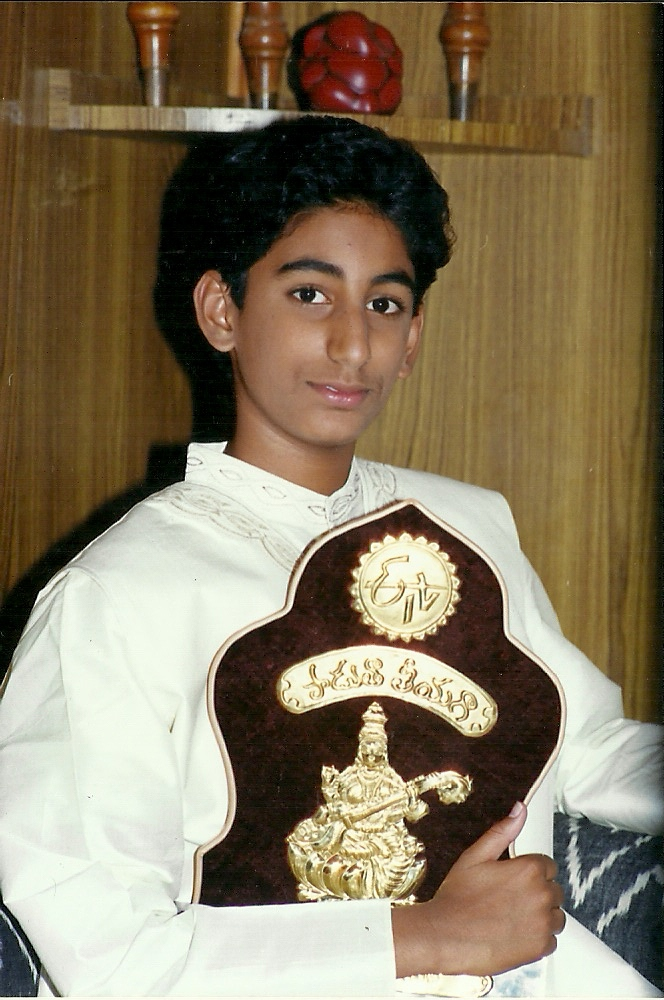
Karunya with his Paaduthaa Theeyagaa trophy

== Discography ==
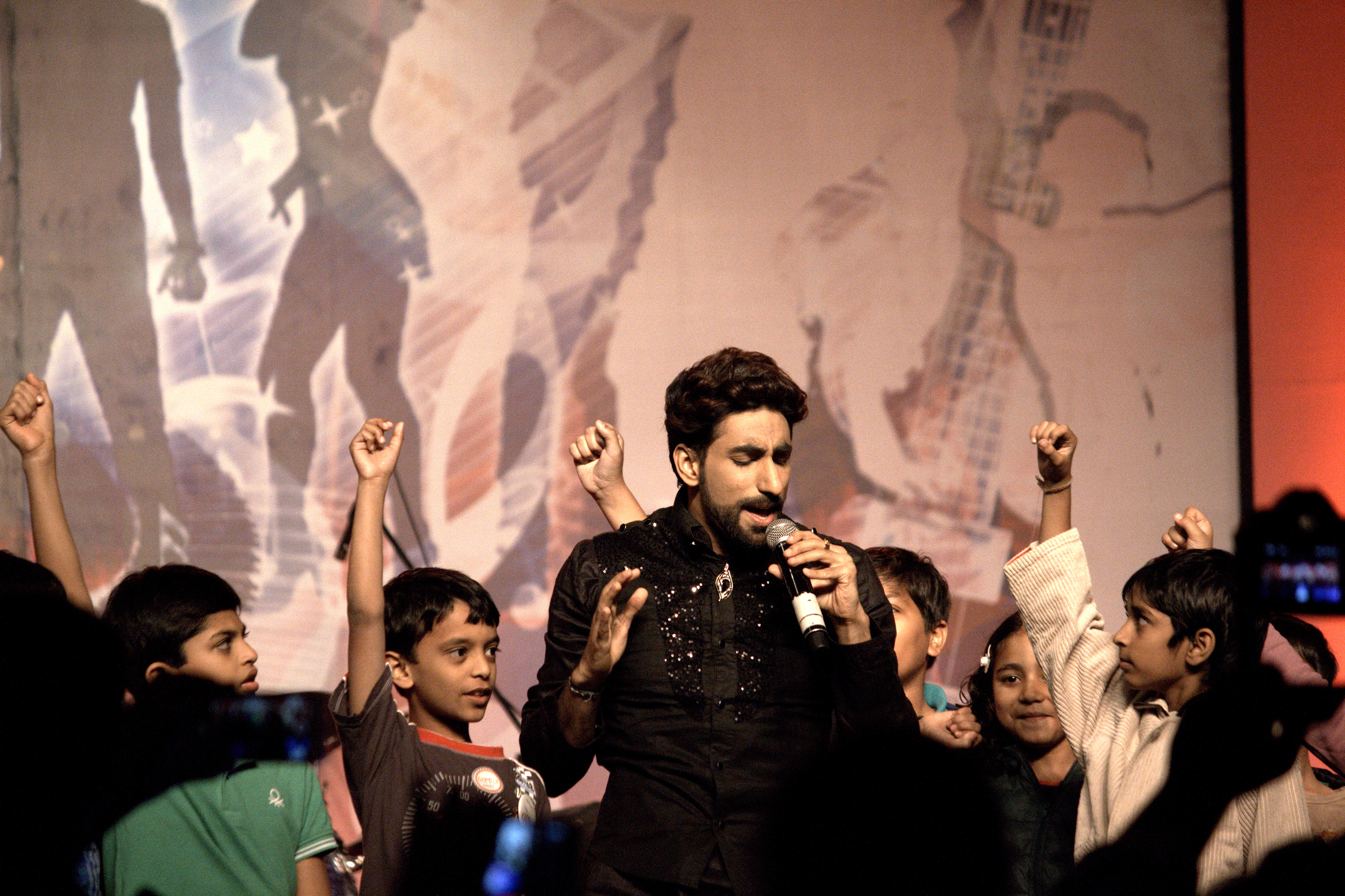
Karunya performing at Ramoji Film City Winter Carnival

Year	Film	Song	Composer	Language
2006	Lage Raho Munna Bhai	"Aane Chaar Aane"	Shantanu Moitra	Hindi
2006	Ashok	"Yekantanga Unna"	Mani Sharma	Telugu
2006	Sainikudu	"Orugalluke Pilla"	Harris Jayaraj	Telugu
2006	Astram	"Sakhiya"	S. A. Rajkumar	Telugu
2006	Raraju	"Chemanthi Chemanthi"	Mani Sharma	Telugu
2007	Chirutha	"Endhuko Pichi Pichi"	Mani Sharma	Telugu
2007	Chandamama	"Ghallu Ghallumantu"	K. M. Radha Krishnan	Telugu
2007	Godava	"Mounamlo"	Mani Sharma	Telugu
2008	Kantri	"123 Nenoka Kantri"	Mani Sharma	Telugu
2008	Baladoor	"Andhamaina"	K. M. Radha Krishnan	Telugu
2008	Siddu from Sikakulam	"Sarasangi Rathanangi"	K. M. Radha Krishnan	Telugu
2009	Arundhati	"Harivillulona Prananiposi"	Koti	Telugu
2009	Boni	"Modati Choope Nalona"	Ramana Gogula	Telugu
2010	Maryada Ramanna	"Ammayi Kitiki Pakkana"	M. M. Keeravani	Telugu
2010	Khaleja	"Om Namo Siva Rudraya"	Mani Sharma	Telugu
2010	Orange	"Oola Oolala Ala"	Harris Jayaraj	Telugu
2011	Teen Maar	"Vayyarala Jabilli"	Mani Sharma	Telugu
2011	Shakti	"Yamaga Unde"	Mani Sharma	Telugu
2011	Maaro	"Kannulu Moose"	Mani Sharma	Telugu
2011	It's My Love Story	"Nindaina Nee Chelimi" "Thadi Pedavule Kalis"	Sunil Kashyap	Telugu
2011	Solo	"Puduthune Solo"	Mani Sharma	Telugu
2011	Seema Tapakai	"Dheere Dheere Dille"	Vandemataram Srinivas	Telugu
2012	Nuvva Nena	"Oy Pilla"	Bheems Ceciroleo	Telugu
2012	All the Best	"All The Best"	Hemachandra	Telugu
2013	Vetadu Ventadu (D)	"Andam Andam"	Yuvan Shankar Raja	Telugu
2013	D for Dopidi	"Meher Meher"	Mahesh Shankar	Telugu
2015	Loafer	"Suvvi Suvvaalamma"	Sunil Kashyap	Telugu
2015	Shivam	"Dham Dham Dhamaruga" "Roma Roma Romance" "Dreamige Bande"	Mani Sharma	Kannada
2016	Irumugan	"Oh Maya"	Harris Jayaraj	Tamil
2016	Inkokkadu (D)	"Chinni Gundelo"	Harris Jayaraj	Telugu
2017	Spyder	"Achcham Telugandham"	Harris Jayaraj	Telugu
2021	Vennela Vacche Padhamani	"Vennela Vacche Padhamani"	P.V.R. Raja	Telugu
2022	Ante Sundaraniki	"Rango Ranga"	Vivek Sagar	Telugu
2025	Oka Brundavanam	"Hey Kadhile Kannulu" "Ye Dhaarini Adigi"	Sunny–Saketh	Telugu
2026	Bad Boy Karthik	"Naa Maava Pillanitthaanannade"	Harris Jayaraj	Telugu
