= Baladoor =

- Theatrical release poster
- Directed by: K. R. Udhayashankar
- Written by: K. R. Udhayashankar
- Produced by: D. Suresh Babu
- Starring: Ravi Teja; Krishna; Anushka Shetty
- Narrated by: Lakshmi Bhoopal
- Cinematography: B. Balamurugan
- Edited by: Marthand K. Venkatesh
- Music by: K. M. Radha Krishnan
- Production company: Suresh Productions
- Distributed by: Suresh Productions
- Release date: 14 August 2008
- Country: India
- Language: Telugu

Baladoor is a 2008 Indian Telugu-language action comedy film directed by K. R. Udhayashankar and produced by D. Suresh Babu under Suresh Productions. The film stars Ravi Teja, Krishna, and Anushka Shetty while Chandra Mohan, Pradeep Rawat, Sunil and Brahmanandam play supporting roles. The film has music composed by K. M. Radha Krishnan with editing performed by Marthand K. Venkatesh. The film was released on 14 August 2008. The film was later dubbed in Hindi as Dhamkee in 2011 and remade into Oriya as Mu Kana Ete Khara.

== Premise ==
Chanti holds his uncle, his father's elder brother, Ramakrishna, in higher regard than his own father, Purushottam. Ramakrishna has a longstanding enmity with Umapathi due to an incident that occurred 20 years ago. Later, due to some misunderstandings, Chanti is expelled from the house. Umapathi is determined to overpower Ramakrishna. The rest of the story unfolds as Chanti secretly aids Ramakrishna in defeating their enemies and eventually reunites with his family.

== Cast ==
- Ravi Teja as Chanti
- Krishna as Ramakrishna
- Anushka Shetty as Bhanumathi
- Paruchuri Venkateswara Rao as Venkatachalam, Umapathi's Aid and Chanti's friend
- Chandra Mohan as Purushotham, Chanti's father
- Pradeep Rawat as Umapathi
- Suman as Samarasimma Reddy, Umapathi's henchmen
- Sunil as Seenu, Chanti's friend
- Sumithra as Lakshmi, Chanti's mother
- Brahmanandam as Nani
- Suman Setty as Pappu
- Subbaraju as Veera, Umapathi's brother-in-law
- Amit Tiwari as Madhukar, Umapathi's friend-in-law
- Gundu Hanumantha Rao as Priest
- Ahuti Prasad as Bhanumathi's father
- L.B. Sriram as Subramanyam
- Pavala Syamala
- Naramalli Sivaprasad
- Raja Ravindra as Chanti's foster brother
- Ravi Prakash as Ravi
- Chalapathi Rao as Ravi's Father
- Narsing Yadav as Car Owner 1
- Melkote as Car Owner 2
- Mallikarjuna Rao as Car Owner 3
- Gundu Sudarshan as Car Owner 4
- Satyam Rajesh as Chanti's foster friend
- Sameer as Chanti's Cousin
- Bhargavi
- Kadambari Kiran Kumar
- Tirupathi Prakash

== Soundtrack ==
Baladoor

Soundtrack album to Baladoor by K. M. Radha Krishnan
- Released: 30 July 2008
- Recorded: 2008
- Genre: Feature film soundtrack
- Length: 32:19
- Language: Telugu
- Label: Aditya Music
- Producer: K. M. Radha Krishnan

K. M. Radha Krishnan chronology
Bhale Dongalu (2008)	Baladoor (2008)	Raju Maharaju (2009)

K. M. Radha Krishnan composed the soundtrack album, which is released on 30 July 2008 by Aditya Music. Chandrabose, Peddada Murthy, and Ananta Sriram gave the lyrics whereas actor Venkatesh released the album CD.

Track list
No.	Title	Lyrics	Artist(s)	Length
1.	"Yetu Podam"	Ananta Sriram	Naveen, Rita	04:37
2.	"Andhamaina"	Chandrabose	Karunya	04:08
3.	"Nuvvu Koncham"	Chandrabose	Rahul Nambiar, Saindhavi	04:11
4.	"Rangu Rangu"	Chandrabose	Tippu, Sujatha Mohan	04:11
5.	"Gundelo Illundhi"	Chandrabose	K. S. Chithra, Karunya	04:09
6.	"Thella Cheera"	Peddada Murthy	Sukhwinder Singh, Anuradha Sriram	04:08

== Reception ==
Radhika Rajmani of Rediff.com rated the film 2 1/2 stars out of 5 and wrote: "Uday Shankar takes up a stereotypical storyline in Baladoor and manages to entertain with a satisfactory screenplay in a formulaic way with a mix of action, comedy and romance." Zamin Ryot's Alluru Rahim in criticized the film's "lackluster screenplay" and added that the director did not handle sentiment properly. In an other negative review, Y. Sunita Chowdhary of The Hindu stated, "Baladoor is an average film, as the banner doesn’t offer nothing new in narration."
