= Selfie Raja =

2016 telugu language film

- Theatrical release poster
- Directed by: G. Eshwar Reddy
- Screenplay by: Diamond Ratnababu
- Story by: G. Eshwar Reddy
- Produced by: Chalasani Rambrahmam Chowdary
- Starring: Allari Naresh; Sakshi Chaudhary; Kamna Singh Ranawat
- Cinematography: Loganathan Srinivasan
- Edited by: M. R. Varma
- Music by: Sai Karthik
- Production company: Gopi Movies
- Distributed by: Anil Sunkara
- Release date: 15 July 2016
- Running time: 126 mins
- Country: India
- Language: Telugu

Selfie Raja is a 2016 Indian Telugu-language comedy film directed by G. Eshwar Reddy and starring Allari Naresh, Sakshi Chaudhary, and Kanwa Ranawat. It is a remake of the Kannada film Victory (2013). At the time of release, the film proved to be the highest-grossing film for Allari Naresh.

== Cast ==
- Allari Naresh as Selfie Raja and Bheems (dual roles)
- Sakshi Chaudhary
- Kamna Singh Ranawat as the police commissioner's daughter
- Nagineedu as the police commissioner
- Saptagiri as a thief
- Prudhvi Raj as Ankusham
- Thagubothu Ramesh as Kattappa
- Shakalaka Shankar as Katraj
- Ravi Babu as Mams
- Satya as Mams's assistant
- Krishna Bhagawan
- Rajitha
- Balli Reddy
- Ajay Ghosh
- Chammak Chandra
- Snigdha
- Sudigali Sudheer as Police constable
- Jabardasth Rachcha Ravi
- Jabardasth Rocket Raghava

== Production ==
Sakshi Chaudhary was cast opposite Allari Naresh for the second time after James Bond (2015). Newcomer Kanwa Ranawat was signed to play one of the lead actresses.

== Soundtrack ==
The soundtrack was composed by Sai Karthik.

Track listing
No.	Title	Lyrics	Singer(s)	Length
1.	"Life Antene"	Bhaskarabhatla	Sai Karthik	3:54
2.	"Selfie Raja"	Ramajogayya Sastry	Saketh Komanduri, Sahithi Komanduri	3:31
3.	"Khali Quarter"	Ramajogayya Sastry	L. V. Revanth	4:24
4.	"Bumper Offer"	Ganesh	Dhanunjay, Divija Karthik	3:18
5.	"Kolathalu"	Thaidala Bapu	Aparna, Sai Charan	4:03
Total length:				19:10

== Reception ==
Sify wrote that "Despite no proper script, Selfie Raja offers some laughs in the first half, but the movie meanders into a mess post interval. Except for few scattered laughs and spoofs, the second half is bore". The Times of India gave the film a rating of two-and-a-half out of five stars and noted that "Cut to 2016, four years after the release of one of his best films, Sudigadu (2012). Naresh is still making films. But sadly, he hasn't been able to deliver anything with punch and yet again, Selfie Raja just adds to that dull streak of his career". The Hindu stated that "Selfie Raja by Eshwar Reddy looks like a movie made in a hurry, inspired by a selfie concept".

== Box office ==
The film made 1.3 crores in the Nizam region.
