= Kajal Aggarwal =

Indian actress (born 1985)

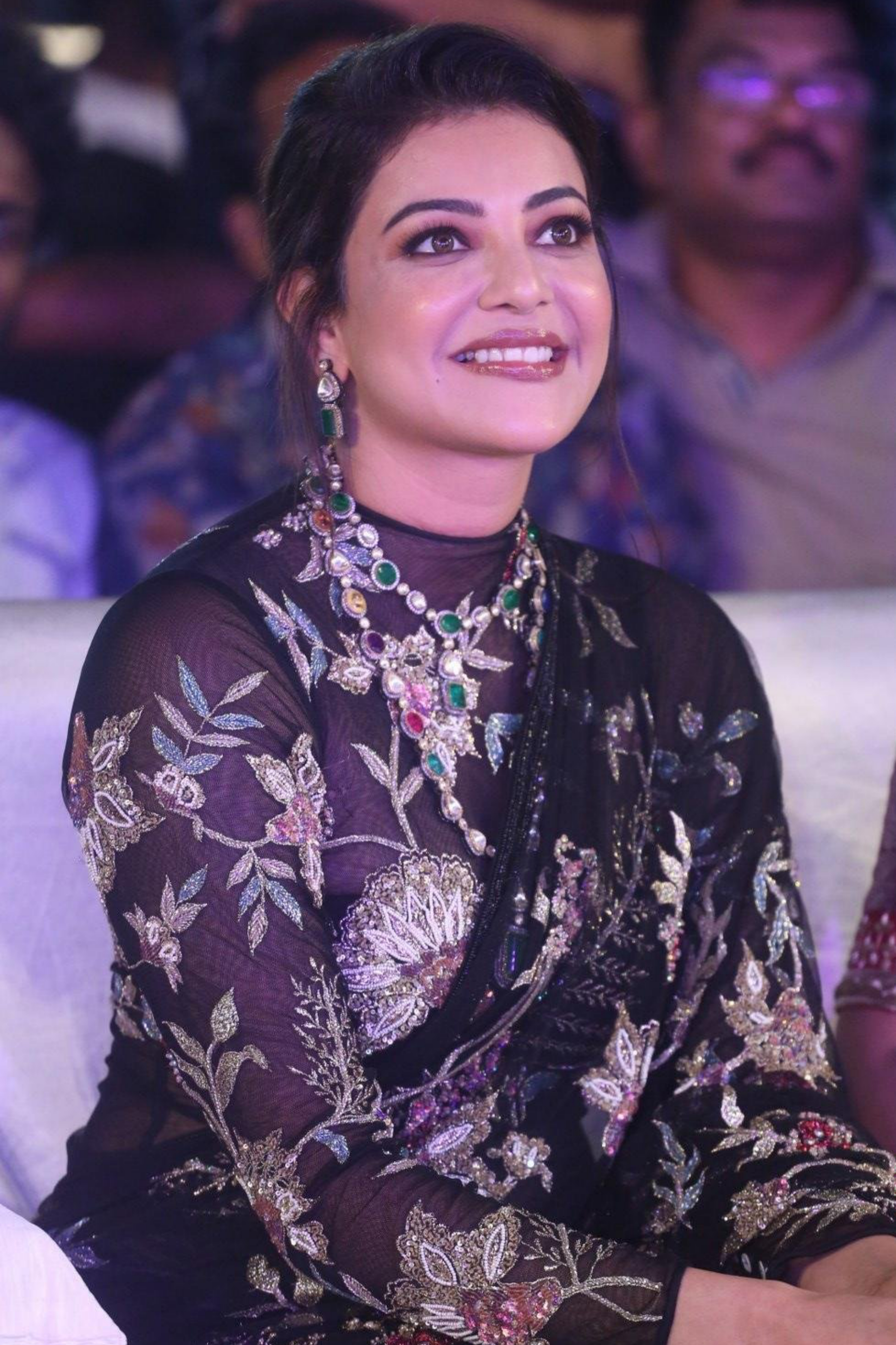
- Aggarwal in 2023
- Born: 19 June 1985 (age 41); Bombay, Maharashtra, India
- Other name: Kajal A Kitchlu
- Education: Kishinchand Chellaram College
- Occupation: Actress
- Years active: 2004–present
- Works: Full list
- Spouse: Gautam Kitchlu (m. 2020)
- Children: 1
- Relatives: Nisha Agarwal (sister)
- Awards: Full list

Kajal A Kitchlu (née Aggarwal; born 19 June 1985), known professionally as Kajal Aggarwal, is an Indian actress who predominantly works in Telugu, Tamil and Hindi films. One of the highest paid actresses of South Indian cinema, Aggarwal is a recipient of several accolades including a Filmfare Award and three SIIMA Awards.

Aggarwal made her acting debut with a minor role in the 2004 Hindi film Kyun! Ho Gaya Na... and had her first Telugu film release in Lakshmi Kalyanam (2007). In the same year, she gained wider recognition for her role in Chandamama. The 2009 fantasy film Magadheera, one of the highest-grossing Telugu films of all time, marked a turning point in her career and earned her critical acclaim.

Her other notable Telugu films include Darling (2010), Brindavanam (2010), Mr. Perfect (2011), Businessman (2012), Naayak (2013), Baadshah (2013), Govindudu Andarivadele (2014), Temper (2015), Khaidi No. 150 (2017), Nene Raju Nene Mantri (2017), Awe (2018) and Bhagavanth Kesari (2023). She has also played the female lead in high-profile Tamil projects such as Naan Mahaan Alla (2010), Maattrraan (2012), Thuppakki (2012), Jilla (2014), Vivegam (2017), Mersal (2017) and Comali (2019). Her most successful Hindi films include the action film Singham (2011) and the thriller Special 26 (2013).

In 2020, a wax figure of Aggarwal was put on display at Madame Tussauds Singapore, a first for an actress from South Indian cinema.

== Early life and education ==
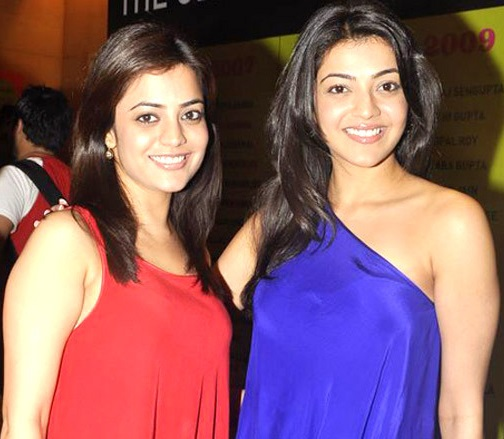
Aggarwal (in blue) with sister Nisha in 2012

Kajal Aggarwal was born on 19 June 1985 and raised in a Punjabi family with roots in Amritsar, settled in Bombay (present-day Mumbai). Her father Vinay Aggarwal, is an entrepreneur in the textile business and her mother Suman is a confectioner, and also Kajal's business manager. Kajal has a younger sister Nisha Agarwal, an actress in Telugu, Tamil and Malayalam cinema.

Aggarwal studied at St. Anne's High School, Fort, Mumbai, and completed her pre-university education at Jai Hind College. She pursued her graduation in mass media, with specialisation in marketing and advertising, from Kishinchand Chellaram College. Having harboured MBA dreams all through her growing years, in 2012, she said she "intended to achieve a post-graduation degree soon."

== Career ==
=== Debut and early struggle (2004–2008) ===
Aggarwal made her acting debut in the 2004 Hindi film Kyun! Ho Gaya Na..., in which she played Aishwarya Rai Bachchan's sister.

Aggarwal made her debut in Telugu films in 2007, with Teja's Lakshmi Kalyanam, alongside Kalyan Ram; it had an average return at the box office. Later that year, she appeared in the Krishna Vamsi-directed Chandamama, which opened to positive reviews and became her first major successful film. In 2008, she had her first Tamil film release, Perarasu's action entertainer Pazhani, opposite Bharath. She had one more Tamil release that year with Venkat Prabhu's comedy-thriller Saroja, in which she did a guest appearance. Although the film went on to become a commercial as well as a critical success, the film failed to boost her career as her role was too insignificant. Her Telugu releases Pourudu and Aatadista opposite Sumanth and Nitin, respectively, did not receive positive reviews from critics, but both were successful at the box office.

=== Critical acclaim and further recognition (2009–2012) ===
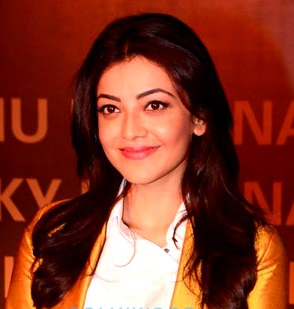
Aggarwal at an event

Aggarwal had four releases in 2009. She first starred opposite Vinay Rai in the Tamil film Modhi Vilayadu, which garnered mixed reviews and was a financial failure. She then appeared in S. S. Rajamouli's high budget Telugu historical drama Magadheera, opposite Ram Charan Teja. She played dual roles of Mithra, a princess and Indu, a modern woman. Aggarwal's performance earned her server nominations including Filmfare Award for Best Actress – Telugu. The film became successful commercially and broke several records, emerging as the highest-grossing Telugu film of all time. Radhika Rajamani of Rediff.com noted, "Kajal was quite a surprise package. She was sweet and charming and looked like an 'ethereal' princess. She carries off both the roles fairly well." It was released again in Tamil as Maaveeran in 2011, and was also successful at the box office. Her subsequent releases Ganesh, opposite Ram Pothineni and Arya 2 opposite Allu Arjun received mixed reviews from critics, while her performance garnered positive feedback.

Aggarwal's first 2010 release was A. Karunakaran's romantic comedy Darling, which featured her as Prabhas's childhood lover Bandini. The film went onto become a commercial success at the box office. Her performance earned her second Filmfare Best Actress – Telugu nomination and a Sify critic stated that she "mesmerized" the audience. Later that year, she appeared in the Tamil thriller film Naan Mahaan Alla, opposite Karthi, which was based on a real-life incident and opened to positive reviews. A commercial success, it was later dubbed in Telugu as Naa Peru Siva in Andhra Pradesh and was a success. Her final release that year was the romantic comedy Brindavanam opposite Jr. NTR and Samantha, which received critical acclaim and went on to become a commercial success. She won the CineMAA Award for Best Actress for the film.

In 2011, Aggarwal first reunited with Prabhas in the romantic comedy Mr. Perfect, where she played Priya, a doctor. The film became a critical and commercial success. A The Times of India critic stated, "Kajal looks great, expresses well and fits into the role perfectly. Her chemistry with Prabhas is commendable." She earned her third Filmfare Best Actress – Telugu nomination, for her performance. She then appeared in Veera, replacing Anushka Shetty and starred opposite Ravi Teja. The film received moderate reviews and emerged a moderate success. Later that year, Aggarwal made her comeback to Hindi films with Singham, a remake of the same-titled 2010 Tamil film, opposite Ajay Devgn. She played a Goan girl Kavya Bhosle and received Filmfare Award for Best Female Debut nomination for the same. Komal Nahta noted, "Kaajal may not be very beautiful but she acts with effortless ease. Her performance is good." Sukanya Venkatraghavan stated, "Kajal looks pretty and has done what she has been told to, but probably deserved a meatier debut." Nevertheless, the film was a hit at the box office. Her last release of the year came with the Telugu film Dhada, opposite Naga Chaitanya, which failed at the box office.

Aggarwal's first release of 2012 was in the Telugu gangster film Businessman opposite Mahesh Babu, directed by Puri Jagannadh. A Sankranthi release, it opened to positive reviews and was a commercial success. Her performance, though limited, was praised by critics. Aggarwal then made her comeback to Tamil films with Maattrraan opposite Suriya. The film became a commercial success. Her performance as a language translator Anjali was well received; with Malini Mannath stating: "Kajal does with utmost sincerity as the foreign language translator Anjali. It's this trait and her graceful demeanour which makes Kajal a pleasant watch". A. R. Murugadoss's Thuppakki opposite Vijay was her next release. She played Nisha, a boxer. The film emerged a major commercial success, becoming the second Tamil film ever to collect over ₹1 billion (US$11 million). L Romal M Singh of Daily News and Analysis stated, "Kajal acts as a pretty face mostly, but is pleasing and cute in many sequences." The film won her the SIIMA Critics Award for Best Actress – Tamil. Her final release of the year was the Telugu romance film Sarocharu, opposite Ravi Teja, which failed at the box office.

I prefer Telugu film industry as women are respected more than they are in the Tamil film industry. In Tamil cinema, they care only about their hero. Of course, I don't give a shit and go and sit in my van

— Aggarwal about the difference she felt between Telugu and Tamil industry.

=== Commercial success and career progression (2013–2017) ===
Aggarwal starred in the action film Naayak, opposite Ram Charan Teja, her first release of 2013. Upon release, it received positive reviews and was a major commercial success. She then played a teacher Priya, opposite Akshay Kumar in Special 26, a heist drama directed by Neeraj Pandey. It went on to be a major critical and commercial success. Rajeev Masand noted, "Kajal keeps it real as the girl next door who falls for Ajay, and their romance is sweet." She later appeared in Srinu Vaitla's Baadshah, opposite Jr. NTR. Upon its release, critics appreciated her performance and a critic stated, "Kajal is as usual an eye-candy. She's got a good role and has done justice to her performance. Also she looks stunning in the songs." The film was a financial success. Her final release that year was All in All Azhagu Raja opposite Karthi. It released to negative reviews from critics and had an average collection.

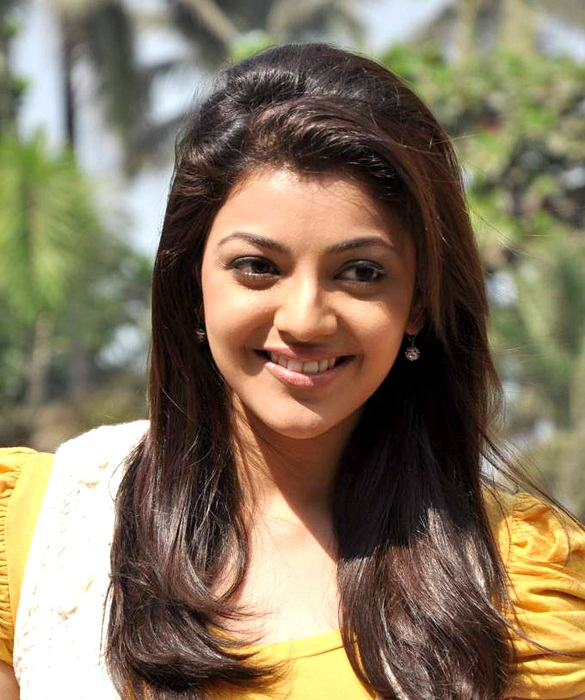
Aggarwal promoting her film Special 26

In 2014, Aggarwal starred in R. T. Neason's masala film Jilla, in which she played a police officer opposite Vijay. The film was a major commercial success. She then featured in a cameo appearance opposite Allu Arjun in the Telugu action thriller film Yevadu, again a box office success. Her next release was Krishna Vamsi's family drama Govindudu Andarivadele, which became one of the highest grossing Telugu film of the year. She played Satya, a modern girl opposite Ram Charan. Suresh Kaviyarani stated, "Kajal is beautiful and glamorous. Her chemistry with Charan comes up neatly." The film earned her fourth nomination for Filmfare Best Actress – Telugu.

In her first release of 2015, Aggarwal appeared in Puri Jagannadh's Telugu action film Temper. She played Saanvi, an animal lover opposite Jr. NTR. Hemanth Kumar noted, "Despite her limited role, Kajal does well, although the duo's underwritten romantic track leaves a lot to be desired." The film was a commercial success and one of the highest-grossing film of the year. Aggarwal then appeared in Balaji Mohan's gangster comedy film Maari, opposite Dhanush. S Saraswathi of Rediff noted: "Kajal Aggarwal does have a significant role to play, but her onscreen chemistry with Dhanush just does not work". The film became a commercial success. Her other release, Suseenthiran's action film Paayum Puli, alongside Vishal, received mixed reviews and failed at the box office. Reviewers criticised her character stating: "badly written and has nothing more to do with the script." That year, she also did a cameo appearance in the bilingual romantic comedy film Size Zero.

The year 2016 saw Aggarwal appear in five films. She first played Arshi, a princess opposite Pawan Kalyan, in Sardaar Gabbar Singh. Critical reaction of the film was mixed to negative, though Aggarwal's performance was positive. A reviewer from the Deccan Chronicle wrote: "Kajal plays the perfect princess and looks beautiful and elegant. In fact, she is a breath of air in the film". The film grossed ₹900 million (US$9.6 million) worldwide, becoming a moderate success. In Srikanth Addala's Brahmotsavam, she played an NRI Kashi opposite Mahesh Babu. It became a major critical and commercial failure. Among the female leads, her performance as a "new age girl" was well received, despite the role having a limited screen time. She next appeared opposite Randeep Hooda in Do Lafzon Ki Kahani, playing Jenny, a blind girl who later becomes a doctor. Rediff.com's Namrata Thakker found her to be "decent" and was appreciative of her chemistry with Hooda. Her long delayed film Final Cut of Director was her next release. Though completed in 2008, it was released in 2016, after 8 years. In her last film of the year, she played Divya, who reconcile with her husband opposite Jiiva in Kavalai Vendam. Sreedhar Pillai of Firstpost stated, "Present throughout the film, Kajal looks a million bucks." She also had a special dance appearance in Janatha Garage, that year. That song, titled "Pakka Local", was well received by the audience.

Aggarwal played Yazhini, a CTS officer's wife opposite Ajith Kumar in Vivegam, her first release of 2017. The film was a moderate success at the box office. Sowmya Rajendran took note of her comic scene in the film. She then reunited with Vijay in Mersal, where she played a doctor, Anu. The film was a major commercial success and became one of the highest-grossing Tamil films. She next appeared opposite Chiranjeevi in Khaidi No. 150. A box office success, it became one of the highest-grossing Telugu films. Teja's Nene Raju Nene Mantri, opposite Rana Daggubati was her last release of the year. She played a strong wife of a Chief minister. Hemanth Kumar noted, "Kajal is the film's biggest revelation. You can feel her pain, her warmth and her anger in moments of heartbreak." Purnima Sriram Iyer stated, "Kajal looks her best and reminds us why she is among the leading actresses of the industry." The film was a commercial success. Her performance won her the SIIMA Award for Best Actress – Telugu.

=== Career fluctuations (2018–present) ===
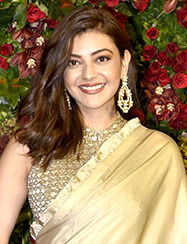
Aggarwal in 2018

Aggarwal had three film released in 2018; she first played a woman suffering from multiple personality disorder in Awe. She then appeared opposite Nandamuri Kalyan Ram in MLA. It received mixed reviews but was a box office success. Has last release that year, Kavacham opposite Bellamkonda Sreenivas, failed at the box office. In 2019, Aggarwal played a businesswoman opposite Bellamkonda Sreenivas in Sita, a doctor opposite Sharwanand in Ranarangam and a museum worker opposite Ravi Mohan in Comali. Among these only Comali became a box office success. Reviewing her work in Sita, a critic from 123telugu noted, "Kajal springs in a surprise in her role which has many negative shades. The star heroine’s body language, dialogue delivery are top notch in the film." Both of Aggarwal's 2021 release failed at the box office leading to a career decline; she appeared opposite John Abraham in Mumbai Saga and opposite Vishnu Manchu in Mosagallu. In the same year, she expanded to streaming series with Live Telecast, playing a director. The series met with mostly negative reviews.

Aggarwal's only release of 2022 became Hey Sinamika, where she played a relationship counsellor opposite Dulquer Salmaan. The film underperformed commercially. She then had three releases in 2023. Aggarwal first appeared in Ghosty. She then played a woman with divine powers in Karungaapiyam. Both films met with negative reviews. Her last release that year was Bhagavanth Kesari, where she played a psychologist opposite Nandamuri Balakrishna. Though critics felt her character was "poorly written", the film received mixed to positive reviews. It emerged a commercial success, her first since Comali and the fifth highest grossing Telugu film of the year. In 2024, Aggarwal appeared in Satyabhama, where she played the titular role of a police officer. Though the film failed at the box office, B.H. Harsh of Cinema Express noted, "Kajal gives a stellar performance. She maintains a great balance of believability and larger-than-life heroism, and brings a touch of self-awareness to the character." Her performance earned her the Filmfare Critics Award for Best Actress – Telugu.

In her first film of 2025, Aggarwal played an aspiring entrepreneur alongside Salman Khan and Vishal Vashishtha in Sikandar. Rahul Desai of The Hollywood Reporter stated, "Capable performer like Kajal has been reduced to the sort of passing character." The film failed to recoup its high production budget. She then appeared in Kannappa as Goddess Parvati, opposite Akshay Kumar, Aggarwal started 2026 with The India Story opposite Shreyas Talpade. Following this, she portrayed Queen Mandodari opposite Yash in Nitesh Tiwari directorial Ramayana: Part 1.

== Personal life ==
On 6 October 2020, Aggarwal announced her upcoming marriage to Gautam Kitchlu. On 30 October 2020, the couple got married in a small, private ceremony in her hometown of Mumbai, India, with only the couple's immediate families in attendance.

Aggarwal made her pregnancy official with an Instagram post, which was also confirmed by her husband shortly. She gave birth to a boy on 19 April 2022, named Neil.

== In the media ==
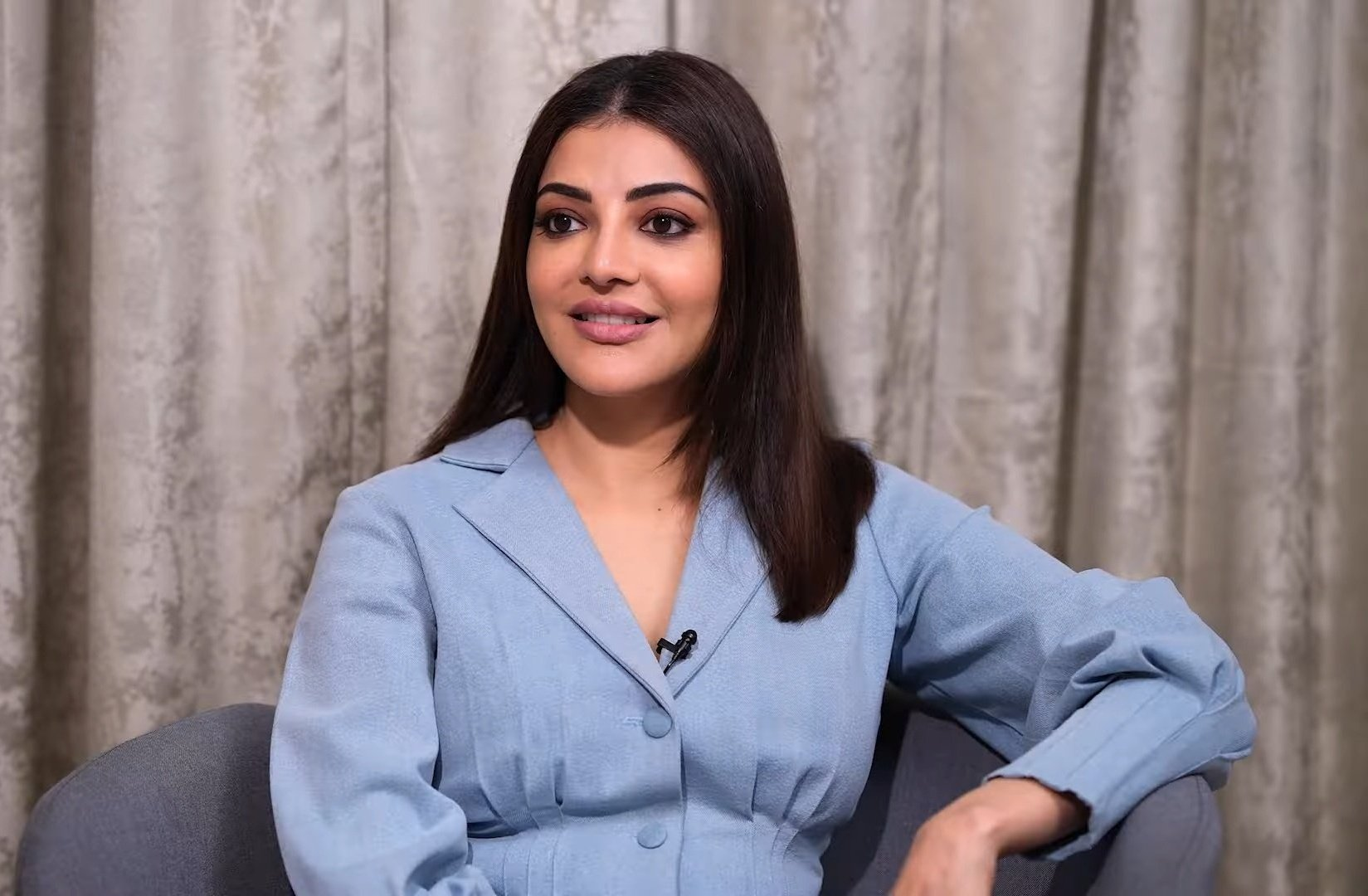
Aggarwal in 2024

Aggarwal is considered among the most popular actors of Telugu cinema. She is one of the highest paid actresses in South Indian cinema, according to various media reports. Aggarwal has appeared in Forbes India's Celebrity 100 list of 2015, where she debuted at 58th position with an estimated annual income of ₹101.3 million (US$1.1 million). She stood at the 15th place on Forbes India's most influential stars on Instagram in South cinema for the year 2021.

Aggarwal was placed 2nd in 2020 and 4th in 2021, in the most tweeted South Indian actresses list. In 2022, she was named among the most searched Asian on Google and also became the most searched South Indian actress, that year. Aggarwal was named the Hyderabad Times Most Desirable Woman of 2016. In the same list, she was later placed 2nd in 2017, 10th in 2018, 8th in 2019 and 9th in 2020. She is a celebrity endorser for several brands such as Panasonic, Dabur Amla Oil, Bru and Pond's. As of August 2024, she is one of the most-followed Telugu actors on Instagram.

== Accolades ==
Aggarwal is a recipient of Filmfare Critics Award for Best Actress – Telugu for Satyabhama. She has received four Filmfare Award for Best Actress – Telugu nominations for — Magadheera, Darling, Mr. Perfect and Govindudu Andarivadele.

== See also ==
- List of Indian film actresses
