= Bhale Dongalu =

2008 Indian film by K. Vijaya Bhaskar

- Movie poster
- Directed by: K. Vijaya Bhaskar
- Screenplay by: K. Vijaya Bhaskar
- Dialogues by: Abburi Ravi
- Story by: Aditya Chopra
- Produced by: Sakhamuri Panduranga Rao; Bellamkonda Suresh (presents)
- Starring: Tarun; Ileana; Jagapati Babu
- Cinematography: Jagan JRJ
- Edited by: Marthand K. Venkatesh
- Music by: K. M. Radha Krishnan
- Production company: Sri Lakshmi Devi Productions
- Release date: 11 April 2008
- Running time: 158 minutes
- Country: India
- Language: Telugu

Bhale Dongalu is a 2008 Telugu-language black comedy con film directed by K. Vijaya Bhaskar and co-produced by Bellamkonda Suresh on Sri Lakshmi Devi Productions banner. A remake of the film Bonnie and Clyde and the Hindi film Bunty Aur Babli (2005), the film stars Tarun, Ileana, Jagapati Babu and music composed by K.M. Radha Krishnan. It received mixed reviews upon release.

== Cast ==
- Tarun as Ramu (Ram) / Romeo
- Ileana as Jyothi / Juliet
- Jagapati Babu as DCP Yugandhar
- Pradeep Rawat as Veerraju
- Paruchuri Venkateswara Rao as Venkatachalam, Veerraju's brother-in-law
- Chandra Mohan as Chandram, Ram's father
- Brahmanandam as Vengala Rao
- Mallikarjuna Rao as Kotaiah
- Sunil as cab driver
- Venu Madhav as truck driver
- M. S. Narayana as Adarsham
- Dharmavarapu Subramanyam as Manmadha Rao, Veerraju's brother-in-law
- Chitram Srinu as bouquet seller
- Ananth Babu as jewellery shop owner
- Kallu Krishna Rao as TC
- Kadambari Kiran as thief on train
- Gundu Sudharshan as passenger on bus
- Uttej as cleaner in a modelling agency
- Malladi Raghava
- Vallabhaneni Janardhan
- C. V. L. Narasimha Rao as Jyoti's father
- Jenny as jewellery shop owner
- Narsing Yadav as Narsing, Veerraju's henchman
- Annapoorna as Jyoti's grandmother
- Sudha as Swarajyam, Ram's mother
- Hema as Susheela, Manmadha Rao' wife
- Shanoor Sana as Lakshmi, Jyoti's mother
- Charmy Kaur as Raksha in an item number "Neethone"

== Soundtrack ==
Bhale Dongalu

Film score by K.M. Radha Krishnan
- Released: 2008
- Genre: Soundtrack
- Length: 25:50
- Label: Aditya Music
- Producer: K.M. Radha Krishnan

K.M. Radha Krishnan chronology
Siddu From Sikakulam (2008)	Bhale Dongalu (2008)	Baladoor (2008)

The music was composed by K.M. Radha Krishnan. The music was released by the Aditya Music company at a function on 13 March 2008 at Annapoorna Studios with Venkatesh and Ravi Teja as the chief guests.

No.	Title	Lyrics	Singer(s)	Length
1.	"Romeo Juliet"	Sahithi	Tippu	3:51
2.	"Neethone"	Vanamali	Shaan, Geetha Madhuri	4:20
3.	"Panchadara Yedarilo"	Veturi	Tippu, Gayatri	4:14
4.	"Manasulo Nuvvena"	Ramajogayya Sastry	K. S. Chithra, Udit Narayan	4:31
5.	"Pasandaina Vela"	Vennelakanti	K. S. Chithra	4:37
6.	"Chota Chota"	Chandrabose	Tippu, Gopika Poornima	4:10
Total length:				25:50

== Reception ==
A critic from Idlebrain.com wrote that "Bhale Dongalu might disappoint if you had already watched Banti aur Babli".
