= Oollo Pelliki Kukkala Hadavidi =

- Movie Poster
- Directed by: Nidhi Prasad
- Written by: Nidhi Prasad
- Produced by: Smt. Bhagyalakshmi
- Starring: Rajendra Prasad; Sakshi Chaudhary
- Cinematography: Vasu
- Edited by: Shankar
- Music by: Anup Rubens
- Production company: JB Creations
- Release date: 27 April 2018
- Running time: 122 mins
- Country: India
- Language: Telugu

Oollo Pelliki Kukkala Hadavidi, also known as Oo Pe Ku Ha, is a 2018 Telugu-language comedy film, produced by Smt. Bhagyalakshmi on JB Creations banner and directed by Nidhi Prasad. Starring Rajendra Prasad and Sakshi Chaudhary, the film has music composed by Anup Rubens.

== Cast ==
- Rajendra Prasad
- Sakshi Chaudhary
- Brahmanandam
- Ali
- Venu Madhav
- L. B. Sriram
- Rishi
- Krishna Bhagawan
- Benerjee
- Surya
- Jeeva
- Amith
- Ravi Prakash
- Raghu Karumanchi
- Krishnudu
- Khayyum
- Hemanth
- Saikumar Pampana
- Dhanraj
- Jyothi

== Production ==
The film notably features almost eighty comedians. The director was inspired by Seven Brides for Seven Brothers (1954) and Paramanandayya Sishyula Katha for the film's story.

== Soundtrack ==
Oollo Pelliki Kukkala Hadavidi

Soundtrack album by Anup Rubens
- Released: 12 March 2017
- Recorded: 2017
- Genre: Soundtrack
- Length: 20:02
- Label: Aditya Music
- Producer: Anup Rubens

Anup Rubens chronology
| Hello (2017) | Oollo Pelliki Kukkala Hadavidi (2017) | Seetharama Kalyana (2018) |

Music composed by Anup Rubens. Lyrics were written by Kandikonda. Music released on ADITYA Music Company.

| No. | Title | Singer(s) | Length |
|---|---|---|---|
| 1. | "Rimbola Rimbola" | Ranina Reddy | 3:38 |
| 2. | "Poola Pandhiri" | Udit Narayan, Sireesha | 3:37 |
| 3. | "Allari Allari" | Sameera Bharadwaj | 4:13 |
| 4. | "Neelala Megam Nuvvu" | Divya Divakar | 4:02 |
| 5. | "Yesukora Natu Kodi" | Anurag Kulkarni, Divya Divakar | 3:53 |
| Total length: | | | 20:02 |
