= Siddhu from Sikakulam =

Siddhu From Sikaakulam
- Film poster
- Directed by: G. Eshwar Reddy
- Written by: G. Eshwar Reddy; Raju M
- Produced by: Malla Vijaya Prasad
- Starring: Allari Naresh; Manjari Phadnis; Shraddha Das
- Cinematography: Dasaradhi Sivendra
- Edited by: Kotagiri Venkateswara Rao
- Music by: K. M. Radha Krishnan
- Production company: Wellfare Creations
- Release date: 14 August 2008
- Running time: 142 minutes
- Country: India
- Language: Telugu

Siddhu from Sikakulam is a 2008 Indian Telugu-language romantic comedy film written and directed by G. Eshwar Reddy and starring Allari Naresh, Manjari Phadnis and Shraddha Das in lead roles. The film soundtrack and background score were composed by K. M. Radha Krishnan. Dialogues for the film were written by Raju M Rajasimha. The film was released on 14 August 2008. The film was a commercial success.

== Plot ==
Siddhu (Allari Naresh) is a young man who hails from Srikakulam, Andhra Pradesh. To pursue his education, he joins a college in Visakhapatnam. There he meets and eventually falls in love with a girl called Sailaja (Manjari Phadnis). After a couple of encounters between the two, Siddhu reveals his love to Sailaja, and she too accepts his love. A few days after the incident, the college declares vacations. On the last of college, Sailaja reveals that her father Obul Reddy (Jaya Prakash Reddy), a big time factionist, has settled her marriage with Bhuma Reddy's (Vijayaranga Raju) brother. On learning about Obul Reddy, Siddhu tells Sailaja that it would be better to break up than continue their love, as he doesn't want to lose his life over love. He thinks of everything practically and reveals his decision. However, Sailaja agrees to separate from him on one condition that Siddhu should come to her marriage and stay with her till the tying of knot by the bridegroom, that too with a smiling face. Siddhu accepts her condition and reaches her village. He withstands his emotions and the teasing of Sailaja. At one stage, Siddhu also tries to tease Sailaja by becoming intimate with her attractive cousin Nisha (Shraddha Das). However, eventually he tells everyone that he loves Sailaja and can not live without her. He finally understands that love is greater than life and he is ready to sacrifice his life for the sake of love. At the same time, using his intelligence he creates a situation where Sailaja's father himself comes to Siddhu and asks him to marry his daughter. Siddhu marries Sailaja with the acceptance of everyone in her family.

== Cast ==
- Allari Naresh as Siddhu
- Manjari Phadnis as Sailaja
- Shraddha Das as Nisha
- Jaya Prakash Reddy as Obul Reddy
- Dharmavarapu Subramanyam as Parasuram, a police inspector.
- Kondavalasa Lakshmana Rao as Konda, police constable
- M. S. Narayana as Rataiah, Obul Reddy's henchmen
- Venu Madhav as Apple, Siddhu's friend
- Vijaya Rangaraju as Bhooma Reddy
- L.B. Sriram as Village priest
- Ahuti Prasad as Obul Reddy's brother
- Kallu Chidambaram as Gannavaram
- Khayyum as Siddhu's friend.
- Kadambari Kiran
- Surekha Vani
- Venu Yeldandi as Dose Babu, servant at Obul Reddy's house.
- Giri Babu as Rama Chandra Murthy, Nisha and Sailaja's mother
- Chandra Mohan as Chandram, Siddhu's father
- Suhasini Maniratnam as Snehalatha, Siddhu's mother
- Sudha as Janaki, Nisha and Sailaja's mother
- Krishna Bhagavaan as Akuvakkala Ananda Rao
- Telangana Shakuntala as Bhooma Reddy's sister
- Master Bharath
- Satyam Rajesh

== Soundtrack ==
Siddu From Sikakulam

Soundtrack album by K. M. Radha Krishnan
- Released: 25 July 2008
- Genre: Feature film soundtrack
- Length: 20:51
- Language: Telugu
- Label: Supreme Music
- Producer: K. M. Radha Krishnan

K. M. Radha Krishnan chronology
| Chandamama (2007) | Siddu From Sikakulam (2008) | Bhale Dongalu (2008) |

The soundtrack of the film was composed by K. M. Radha Krishnan. The audio was launched on 25 July 2008 at Prasad Labs in Hyderabad. The audio was released under Supreme Music label.

Track listing
| No. | Title | Lyrics | Artist(s) | Length |
|---|---|---|---|---|
| 1. | "Na Nababa Nanana" | Bhoopal | K. M. Radha Krishnan, Swetha | 04:07 |
| 2. | "Jampandu Lanti Pilla" | Vanamali | Ranjith | 04:29 |
| 3. | "O Kshanamainaa Chaalu" | Veturi | Hemachandra, Sahiti | 04:16 |
| 4. | "Thellariponiku" | Peddada Murthy | Gayathri | 03:52 |
| 5. | "Sarasangi Rathanangi" | Sai Sriharsha | Karunya | 04:07 |
| Total length: | | | | 20:51 |

== Reception ==
The film was released on 14 August 2008 to negative reviews. Reviewer from the Bangalore Mirror called the film Rayalaseema's DDLJ and added, "instead of tickling the funny bone, these actually feel absurd. Naresh’s performance is okay, it’s the cute Manjari Phadnis [...] who is the saving grace of the film". Reviewer from Cinegoer.com gave a 1 of 5 star rating for the film and commented that the pace of the film was really slow and the movie has little to offer and music or performances are nothing special as well.
