= Filmfare Critics Award for Best Actress – Telugu =

Indian annual film award

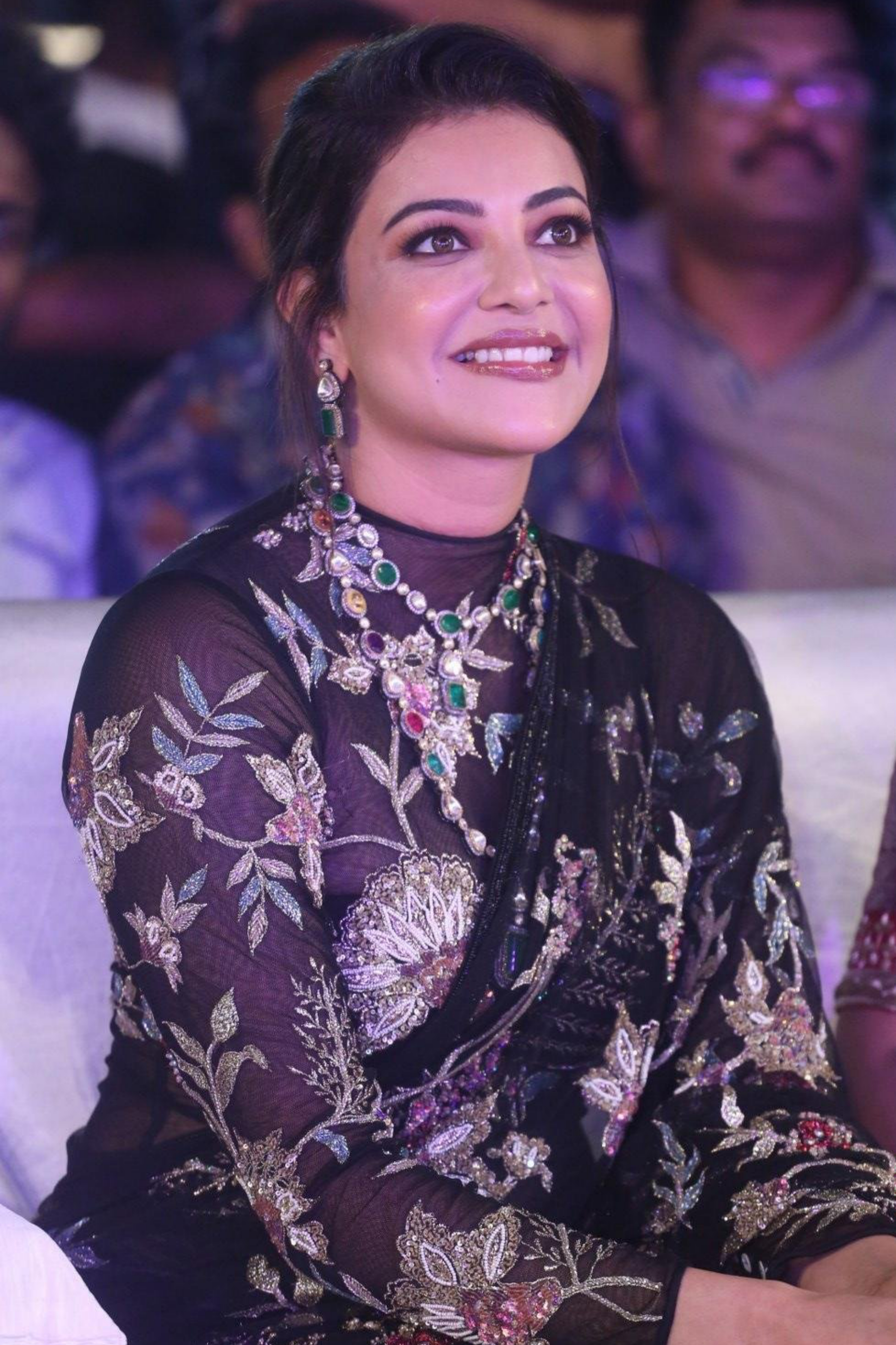
- The 2024 Recipient : Kajal Aggarwal
- Awarded for: Best performance by an actress in Telugu films
- Country: India
- Presented by: Filmfare
- First award: 2015
- Currently held by: Kajal Aggarwal for Satyabhama (2024)

Highlights
- Most wins: Sai Pallavi (2)

The Filmfare Critics Award for Best Actress – Telugu is given by Filmfare as part of its annual Filmfare Awards South for Telugu films. The award is given by a chosen jury of critics.

== Winners ==
Year	Actress	Role	Film	Ref.
2015	Nithya Menen	Nazeera Khanum	Malli Malli Idi Rani Roju	
2016	Ritu Varma	Chitra	Pelli Choopulu	
2017	Ritika Singh	Rameswari	Guru	
2018	Rashmika Mandanna	Geetha	Geetha Govindam	
2020 / 21	Sai Pallavi	Maithreyi / Rosie	Shyam Singha Roy	
2022	Sai Pallavi	Vennela	Virata Parvam	
2023	Vaishnavi Chaitanya	Vaishnavi	Baby	
2024	Kajal Aggarwal	Satyabhama IPS	Satyabhama	

== Superlatives ==
Superlative	Actress	Record
Most wins	Sai Pallavi	2
Oldest winner	Kajal Aggarwal	38 years
Youngest winner	Rashmika Mandanna	23 years

== See also ==
- Filmfare Critics Award for Best Actor – Telugu
