= Ramachari =

- Promotional poster
- Directed by: G. Eshwar Reddy
- Screenplay by: G. Eshwar Reddy
- Based on: CID Moosa (2003)
- Produced by: Venkata Shyam Prasad; Malla Vijaya Prasad
- Starring: Venu Thottempudi; Kamalinee Mukherjee
- Music by: Mani Sharma
- Production company: SP Entertainments
- Release date: 17 May 2013
- Country: India
- Language: Telugu

Ramachari – Eedo Pedda Goodachari is a 2013 Indian Telugu-language comedy film directed by G. Eshwar Reddy. A remake of C.I.D. Moosa, the film stars Venu Thottempudi and Kamalinee Mukherjee. The film was released on 17 May 2013. After the failure of this film, Venu Thottempudi took a break from acting.

== Cast ==
- Venu Thottempudi as Ramachari
- Kamalinee Mukherjee as Geetha
- Ali as Ganguly
- Brahmanandam as Chinta
- Giri Babu as Police Inspector
- Chandra Mohan as Kotachari
- L. B. Sriram as Tatachari
- M. Balayya as Harischandra Prasad
- Murali Sharma as Chadda
- Suthi Velu as Ganapathi
- Raghu Babu as Flight captain
- Rocket Raghava as Police officer
- Komal Jha (special appearance in the "Sherlock Homes" song)

== Soundtrack ==
The soundtrack was composed by Mani Sharma.

Track listing
No.	Title	Lyrics	Singer(s)	Length
1.	"Sherlock Holmes"	Viswa	Ranjith	3:30
2.	"Sudigalai"	Ramajogayya Sastry	Mallikarjun	4:44
3.	"Maine Pyar Kiya"	Ramajogayya Sastry	Vedala Hemachandra	3:20
4.	"Pi Pi Pi Dum Dum Dum Dum"	Ramajogayya Sastry	Venu, Malavika	3:50
Total length:				15:24

== Reception ==
A critic from The Times of India wrote that "In the garb of comedy, you will realise there is so much of silly stuff, that towards the end you won’t mind it – so long as the packaged comedy is funny enough to provoke laughter".
