= Sakshi Chaudhary =

Indian model and film actress

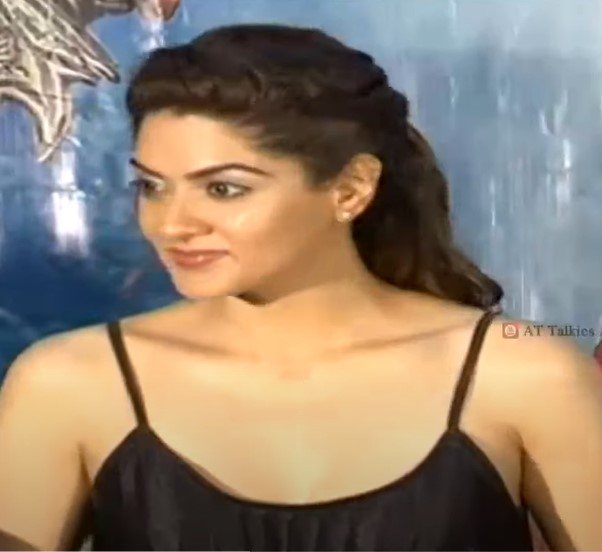
- Chaudhary in 2019
- Born: Dehradun, Uttarakhand, India
- Occupations: Actress, model
- Years active: 2013–present

Sakshi Chaudhary, born in Dehradun, Uttarakhand, India is an Indian model and film actress. Sakshi primarily appears in Telugu movies, starting with Potugadu (2013).

== Filmography ==
Year	Film	Role	Language	Notes	Ref.
2013	Potugadu	Mumtaz	Telugu	Debut film	
2015	James Bond	Pooja / Bullet	Telugu		
2016	Selfie Raja		Telugu		
2016	Siddhartha		Telugu		
2017	Aayirathil Iruvar	Adhirshtamalar	Tamil	Credit as: Samuthrika	
2017	Oxygen	Herself	Telugu	Special appearance in "The Queen of Dhaba (Adhirindhe)" song	
2018	Magnet		Telugu		
2018	Oollo Pelliki Kukkala Hadavidi		Telugu		
2019	Rustum	Herself	Kannada	Special appearance in "Singaaravva" song	
2019	Iruttu	Regina Chezhiyan	Tamil		
2022	Nenevaru	Akshara	Telugu		
2023	Suvarna Sundari	Sakshi	Telugu		
2023	Dil Bedhund		Marathi		
2024	100 Crores		Telugu		
