= Seeta Ramula Kalyanam Lankalo =

- Directed by: G. Eshwar Reddy
- Written by: Vikram Raj
- Starring: Nithiin; Hansika Motwani
- Cinematography: V. Malhar Bhatt Joshi
- Edited by: Kotagiri Venkateswara Rao
- Music by: Anup Rubens
- Release date: 22 January 2010
- Country: India
- Language: Telugu

Seeta Ramula Kalyanam Lankalo (transl. Seetha and Rama's wedding in Sri Lanka) is a 2010 Indian Telugu-language action comedy film directed by G. Eshwar Reddy and starring Nithiin and Hansika Motwani. It was dubbed into Hindi as Dushmano Ka Dushman and into Tamil as Rowdy Kottai. It was remade in Odia in 2014 as Mental, starring Anubhav Mohanty.

== Plot ==
Chandra Shekhar "Chandu" (Nithiin) is a daredevil youth, a fearless boy. He meets a beautiful girl named Nandhini, "Nandu" (Hansika Motwani), the daughter of a dreaded factionalist named Peddi Reddy (Suman). He falls in love, and starts teasing her and tries to prove that he sincerely loves Nandu. He tells Nandu that he could do anything for her. Nandu tells him that he should not follow her until she calls him. In order to grab her attention, he sends his father (Chandramohan) and mother (Pragathi) to convey his love and let her know that they approve of their relationship. Later, Nandu realises that she too truly loves him. Then, Jaya Prakash Reddy asks Peddi Reddy to marry Nandu to his nephew Veera Pratap Reddy (Salim Baig). Peddi Reddy refuses which ignites factionalism between the two. Just when Nandu wants to express her love to Chandu, she is taken away by her father to their village. The film climaxes when Chandu and Nandu reunite and affirm their love.

== Cast ==
- Nithiin as Chandrasekhar "Chandu" Reddy
- Hansika Motwani as Nandhini "Nandhu"
- Salim Baig as Veera Pratap "VP"
- Suman as Peddi Reddy, Nandhini's father
- Chandra Mohan as Chandram, Chandu's father
- Pragathi as Lalita, Chandu's mother
- Jaya Prakash Reddy as Jayaprakash, Veera Pratap's uncle
- Raj Premi as Veera Pratap's father
- Brahmanandam as Adv. Appalaraju, MA LLB / Pappalaraju
- Ali as Ram Prasad
- Subbaraju as Bujji
- Duvvasi Mohan as Bujji's henchman
- Venu Madhav as Gambler
- M. S. Narayana as 'Risk' Rambo
- Satyam Rajesh as Chandu's friend
- Jeeva as a man at the bar
- Fish Venkat as Henchman
- Narsing Yadav as Narsing
- Kallu Chidambaram as Doctor
- Venu Yeldandi as Chandu's friend
- Sattanna as Rambo's PA
- Surekha Vani as Nandhini's aunt

== Soundtrack ==
The music was composed by Anup Rubens and released by Aditya Music.

Seeta Ramula Kalyanam

Soundtrack album by Anup Rubens
- Released: December 2009
- Recorded: 2009
- Genre: Soundtrack
- Length: 31:16
- Label: Aditya Music
- Producer: Anup Rubens

Anup Rubens chronology
Drona (2009)	Seeta Ramula Kalyanam (2009)	Andari Bandhuvaya (2010)

Track list
No.	Title	Lyrics	Singer(s)	Length
1.	"Adhirindhi"	Bhuvana Chandra	Daler Mehndi, Aishwarya, Parthasarathy	4:40
2.	"Koncham"	Bhaskarabhatla Ravi Kumar	Siddharth, Sravana Bhargavi	3:44
3.	"Nakkallo" (Female)	Ananta Sriram	Shweta Mohan, Suji	4:42
4.	"Basic Ga"	Bhaskarabhatla Ravi Kumar	Krishna Chaitanya, Robin	4:45
5.	"Nakkallo"	Ananta Sriram	Daler Mehndi, Aishwarya	4:41
6.	"Adhirindhi" (Remix)	Bhuvana Chandra	Ramesh Patnaik	4:28
7.	"Vellake"	Sai Sri Harsha	Ranjith, Harshika	4:16
Total length:				31:16

== Reception ==
Jeevi of Idlebrain.com called the film "a disappointment". A critic from 123telugu wrote that "Seetha Ramula Kalyanam…Lanka Lo is yet another film which uses the tried and tested formula of love-family entertainer".
