= K. M. Radha Krishnan =

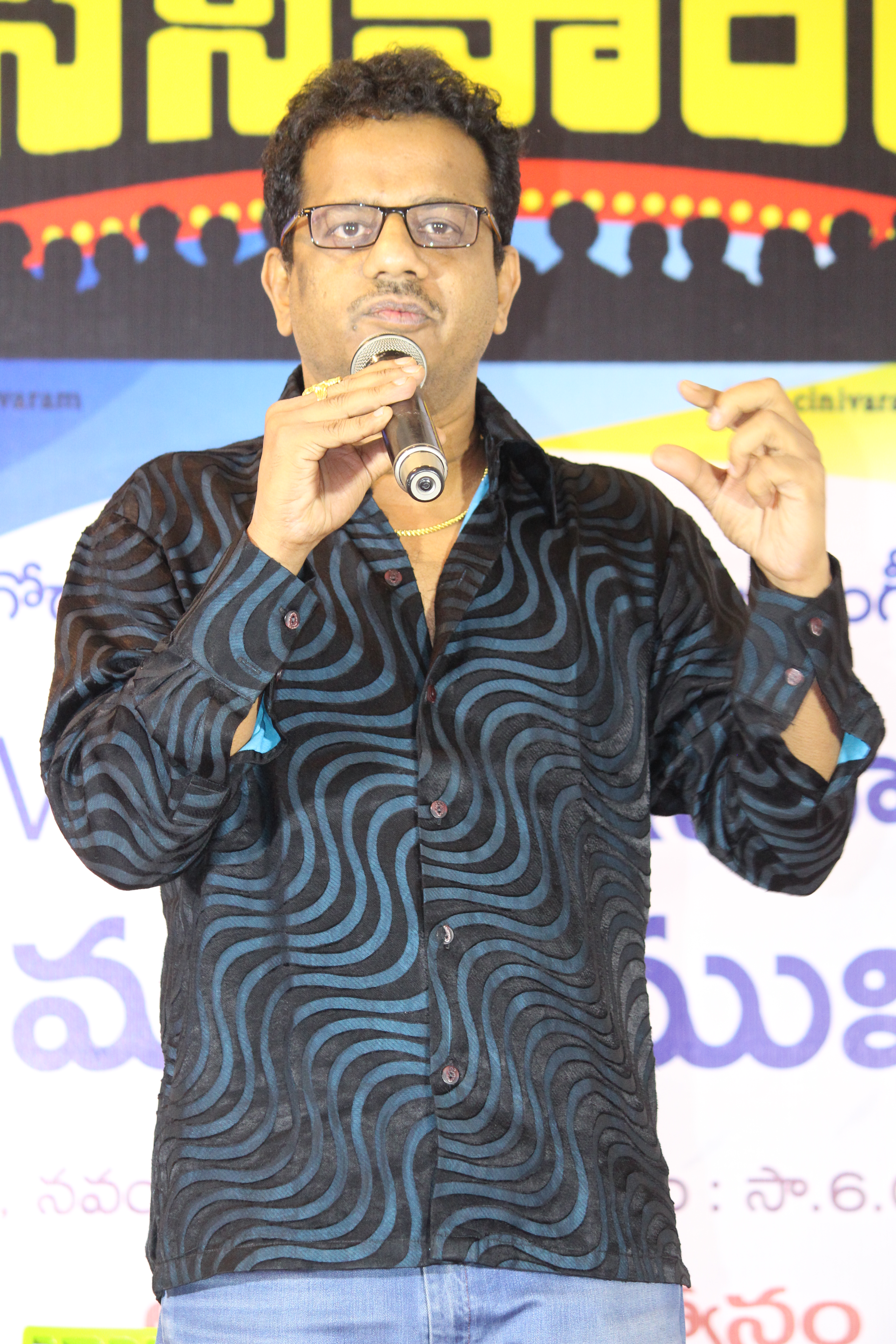
- K. M. Radha Krishnan in Cinivaram

Background information
- Born: Wanaparthy, Telangana, India
- Occupations: Film composer, Music director, Playback singer
- Years active: 2002-present

K. M. Radha Krishnan is an Indian music composer known for his works predominantly in Telugu cinema. Some of his most notable works are Anand (2004), Godavari (2006), and Chandamama (2007). In 2006, he received the state Nandi Award for Best Music Director.

== Background ==
K. M. Radha Krishnan was born in Wanaparthy and studied there until year three. He then went to Coimbatore and returned after a few years to complete schooling in Gadwal. His father K. V Mohan, who worked for All India Radio since 1973, was Radha Krishnan's inspiration to become a musician. His father used to sing light music and was also a stage actor, performing in over 500 stage shows. Inspired by his father, Radha Krishnan learned Hindustani classical music with the help of Chaganti Lakshmi for a couple of years. He settled in Hyderabad, where he completed diploma at Hyderabad Music College and trained as a music teacher. He learned western classical music from Arnold for a couple of years and Carnatic classical music from Vengamamba. He conducted research on blending Hindustani music.

== Early career ==
K. M. Radha Krishnan aspired to become a singer like S. P. Balasubrahmanyam during his youth. He practiced and improvised his father's music. After two years, he started analyzing songs and realized he could be a composer. While seeking opportunities as a music director in the film industry, he composed the background music for Sunil Kumar Reddy's film Silence Please. After a two-year gap, he scored music for a children's film called ‘Hero’.

== Discography ==
=== As composer ===
| Year | Title | Notes |
|---|---|---|
| 2000 | Silence Please | Background score only |
| 2002 | Hero | |
| 2004 | Anand | |
| 2004 | Megham | |
| 2005 | Kanchanamala Cable TV | |
| 2006 | Godavari | Nandi Award for Best Music Director |
| 2006 | Manasu Palike Mouna Raagam | |
| 2006 | Mayabazar | |
| 2007 | Chandamama | |
| 2008 | Siddu From Sikakulam | |
| 2008 | Bhale Dongalu | |
| 2008 | Baladur | |
| 2009 | Raju Maharaju | Background score only |
| 2011 | Naaku O Loverundi | |
| 2014 | Lakshmi Raave Maa Intiki | |
| 2018 | Oorantha Anukuntunnaru | |
| 2018 | Shubhalekha+Lu | |
| 2024 | Konchem Hatke | |
| 2026 | Papam Prathap | Only songs |

=== As playback singer ===
- 2004 - Anand
- 2004 - Megham
- 2006 - Godavari, Mayabajar, Manasu Palike Mouna Raagam.
- 2007 - Chandamama
- 2008 - Siddu From Sikakulam
- 2008 - Baladur
- 2024 - Konchem Hatke
- 2026 - Papam Prathap

=== As lyricist ===
- 2008 - Bhale Dongalu

== Filmography ==
=== Television ===
| Year | Title | Role | Network | Notes |
|---|---|---|---|---|
| 2024 | Miss Perfect | Himself | Disney+ Hotstar | Cameo appearance |
