= Chandamama (2007 film) =

- Poster
- Directed by: Krishna Vamsi
- Written by: Krishna Vamsi
- Produced by: C. Kalyan; S Vijayanand
- Starring: Navdeep; Kajal Aggarwal; Siva Balaji; Sindhu Menon
- Cinematography: Prasad Murella
- Edited by: Shankar
- Music by: K. M. Radha Krishnan
- Release date: 6 September 2007
- Running time: 156 mins
- Country: India
- Language: Telugu
- Box office: ₹8 crore distributors' share

Chandamama (transl. Moon) is a 2007 Indian Telugu-language romantic drama film written and directed by Krishna Vamsi, and produced by C. Kalyan and S. Vijayanand. The film stars Navdeep, Kajal Aggarwal, Siva Balaji, and Sindhu Menon, while Naga Babu, Ahuti Prasad, and Satyam Rajesh play supporting roles. The musical score is provided by K. M. Radha Krishnan and the base story by Akula Venkat. The film was released on 6 September 2007 to highly positive reviews and also garnered five Nandi Awards. The film was remade in Tamil as A Aa E Ee (2009) and in Kannada as Chellidaru Sampigeya (2009).

== Plot ==
Ranga Rao, a widower, landlord, and well-respected man, loves his beloved daughter Mahalakshmi, a sweet, intelligent, innocent, and somewhat fun-loving girl who loves her father as much as he loves her, more than anything else. His brother also has a daughter Rani and a son. Rani is like a sister to Mahalakshmi and a second daughter to Ranga Rao. Rani is a hyper, whiny, talkative but fun-loving, sweet girl. When Mahalakshmi returns from college, Ranga Rao realizes that she has grown up and decides to fix her marriage with Dhorababu, an innocent, good-natured, and rather shy boy.

After the engagement, Mahalakshmi reveals to Dhorababu that in the city, she had fallen in love with Kishore, a mischievous, witty, and amiable youth. After spending the night with her, Kishore made it clear that he was not interested in marrying her. Mahalakshmi says that she does not want to lie and cheat Dhorababu because she knows he is good and deserves better. Dhorababu goes to meet and confront Kishore, where he learns it was all a prank and that Kishore loves Mahalakshmi. He fakes an accident and brings Kishore to the village under the pretense of a doctor. Mahalakshmi forgives Kishore. Finding out the secret, Rani falls in love with Dhorababu and vice versa. However, they dare not tell anyone.

Ranga Rao misunderstands their feelings and fixes Rani's marriage with Kishore to take place at the same time as Mahalakshmi's with Dhorababu. The four youngsters decide that the only way left is to elope, though Mahalakshmi has mixed feelings about this, as she feels it would hurt her father. At the last minute, Mahalakshmi cannot go through with it and tearfully confesses the truth to her father. Luckily, Ranga Rao understands and has the girls marry their respective lovers.

== Cast ==
- Navdeep as Kishore, Mahalakshmi's love interest
- Kajal Aggarwal as Mahalakshmi, Kishore's love interest & Ranga Rao's daughter (Voice by Charmy Kaur).
- Siva Balaji as Dhorababu, Rani's love interest
- Sindhu Menon as Rani, Dhorababu's love interest
- Naga Babu as Ranga Rao, Mahalakshmi's father and Rani's uncle
- Ahuti Prasad as Ramalingeswara Rao, Ranga Rao's traditional ally (Co-Brother-in-law).
- Satyam Rajesh as Rani's brother
- Uttej as Kondala Rao
- Abhinayashree as Sakkubai
- Radha Kumari as Dhorababu's grandmother
- Jeeva as Police Inspector
- Gundu Sudarshan as Police Constable
- Ananth as Priest
- Sameer as Doctor
- Rajitha as Ranga Rao's wife

== Soundtrack ==
Chandamama

Soundtrack album by K. M. Radha Krishnan
- Released: 20 August 2007
- Recorded: 2007
- Genre: Feature film soundtrack
- Length: 27:28
- Language: Telugu
- Label: Supreme Music
- Producer: K. M. Radha Krishnan

K. M. Radha Krishnan chronology
Mayabazar (2006)	Chandamama (2007)	Siddu from Sikakulam (2008)

The film's music was launched on 20 August 2007 in a live telecaste of a private TV channel. The launch was attended by the film cast and crew. K. M. Radha Krishnan composed the music. Krishna Vamsi released the audio and handed over the first cassette to producer C. Kalyan. Supreme Music bought the audio rights.

Tracklist
No.	Title	Lyrics	Artist(s)	Length
1.	"Regumullole"	Suddala Ashok Teja	Karthik, M. M. Srilekha, Noel Sean (Rap)	04:58
2.	"Bugge Bangaarama"	Peddada Murthy	Rajesh Krishnan	04:32
3.	"Ghallu Ghallumantu"	Vanamali	Karunya, Gayatri Iyer	04:14
4.	"Nalo Voohalaku"	Anantha Sreeram	Asha Bhosle, K. M. Radha Krishnan	04:33
5.	"Sakkubaayine"	Lakshmi Bhupal	Jassie Gift, Mamta Mohandas	04:34
6.	"Mukkupai Muddupettu"	Sai Sriharsha	Haricharan, Sujatha Mohan	05:29
Total length:				27:28

== Reception ==
A critic from Rediff.com wrote that "On the whole, a good entertaining film and credit surely goes to Krishna Vamsi, the director". Jeevi of Idlebrain.com wrote that "The major entertainment in this film is provided by Ahuti Prasad and Navadeep. On the flip side, there is no emotional depth which we usually experience in Krishna Vamsi's films".

== Remakes ==
Year	Film	Language	Cast	Director
2009	A Aa E Ee	Tamil	Navdeep, Monica, Aravind Akash, Saranya Mohan	S. D. Sabapathy
2009	Chellidaru Sampigeya	Kannada	Prashanth, Vishal, Bianca Desai	S. Narayan

== Box office ==
The film was successful at the box office and completed a 100-day run on 18 December 2007.

== Awards ==
Nandi Awards

- Best Home - Viewing Feature Film - C. Kalyan
- Best Director - Krishna Vamsi
- Best Character Actor - Ahuti Prasad
- Best Art Director - Srinivasa Raju
- Best Male Comedian - Uttej
