= Nidamanur =

Nidamanur or Nidamanuru or Nidamanoor may refer to places in India:

- Nidamanur mandal, a mandal in Nalgonda district, Andhra Pradesh
- Nidamanur, Prakasam, a village in Andhra Pradesh
- Nidamanur, Vijayawada, in NTR district, Andhra Pradesh
