= Raju Maharaju =

2009 film

- Directed by: Shankaranath Durga
- Written by: Jeevana Satyam (dialogues)
- Screenplay by: Shankaranath Durga
- Story by: Shankaranath Durga
- Starring: Mohan Babu; Sharwanand; Surveen Chawla; Ramya Krishna
- Cinematography: R. Ramesh Babu
- Edited by: Kotagiri Venkateswara Rao
- Music by: Chakri; K. M. Radha Krishnan (background music)
- Release date: 19 June 2009
- Running time: 155 minutes
- Country: India
- Language: Telugu

Raju Maharaju is a 2009 Telugu-language film directed by Shankaranath Durga. It is based on the story of poochina.The film stars Mohan Babu, Sharwanand, Surveen Chawla (in her Telugu debut) and Ramya Krishna in the lead roles. This film has been music composed by Chakri. The film was dubbed into Tamil as Raja Maharaja. The film won two Nandi Awards.

== Cast ==
- Sharwanand as Kalyan
- Mohan Babu as Chakravarthy
- Surveen Chawla as Sneha
- Ramya Krishna as Ramya
- Brahmanandam as Om Raja
- Giri Babu
- Chandra Mohan
- Nassar
- Nutan Prasad
- M.S. Narayana
- Sunil as Gopatra
- Jayasudha (guest role)
- Tashu Kaushik as Bindu
- Jayaprakash Reddy
- Raghu Babu
- Surekha Vani
- Bhargavi
- L. B. Sriram
- Dharmavarapu Subramanyam
- Rani

== Soundtrack ==
No.	Title	Singer(s)	Length
1.	"Mamathala Kovela"	Vijay Yesudas
2.	"Maka Maka Makareena"	Chakri, Kousalya
3.	"Kalalone Kalagantunnachakri (I)"	Chakri, Sudha
4.	"Nuvvante Pranamani"	Chakri
5.	"Kalalone Kalagantunnachakri (II)"	Shaan, Sudha
6.	"Poochina Poovalle"	Baba Sehgal, Shivani
7.	"Okate Okatokate"	Baba Sehgal
8.	"Gundenu Patti"	Simha

== Awards ==
Nandi Awards - 2009

- Award for Best Supporting Actress - Ramya Krishna
- Nandi Special Jury Award - Kumara Swamy (Producer)
