= James Bond (2015 film) =

- Official film poster
- Directed by: Sai Kishore Macha
- Produced by: Ramabrahmam Sunkara
- Starring: Allari Naresh; Sakshi Chaudhary
- Music by: Sai Karthik
- Production company: A. K. Entertainments
- Distributed by: A. K. Entertainments
- Release date: 24 July 2015
- Country: India
- Language: Telugu

James Bond is a 2015 Indian Telugu-language action comedy film written and directed by Sai Kishore Macha and produced by Anil Sunkara under the banner A. K. Entertainments. It features Allari Naresh and Sakshi Chaudhary in the lead roles while Ashish Vidyarthi, Raghu Babu and Krishna Bhagavan appear in supporting roles. The film is loosely based on the Korean film My Wife Is a Gangster.

== Plot ==
Nani (Allari Naresh) is a simple, down-to-earth software employee. He and his family hate getting into problems and lead a very simple life. A twist in the tale arises when he marries a lady don Pooja alias Bullet (Sakshi Chaudhary) without knowing about her past and criminal activities. Halfway through his marriage, Nani discovers his wife's original background and decides to leave her and run away from the city. The rest of the story is as to how Nani manages to deal with these tricky situations and solves all his problems. Solving all the situations, at last Pooja gets pregnant and Nani is captured by the opponents. When Nani knows Pooja is pregnant, he fights the goons. After having a baby girl, the position of Bullet goes to Nani. (Featuring a character as a sequel).

== Cast ==
- Allari Naresh as Nani / Edara Lakshmi Prasad
- Sakshi Chaudhary as Bullet / Pooja Ponne Ghanti / Edara
- Ashish Vidyarthi as Bada Naik
- Chandra Mohan as Nani's father
- Prabha as Pooja's mother
- Krishna Bhagavan as Marriage Bureau Chief
- Hema
- Posani Krishna Murali
- Jaya Prakash Reddy
- Raghu Babu
- Banerjee
- Prudhviraj
- Praveen
- Shravan as Bullet's Henchmen
- Saptagiri
- Prabhas Sreenu
- Fish Venkat as Simhachalam
- Satya as Shekhar
- Rajitha
- Ramajogayya Sastry in a cameo appearance

== Soundtrack ==
James Bond

Soundtrack album by Sai Karthik
- Released: 14 May 2015
- Recorded: 2015
- Genre: Soundtrack
- Length: 17:17
- Label: Aditya Music
- Producer: Sai Karthik

Sai Karthik chronology
Superstar Kidnap (2015)	James Bond (2015)	Dongaata (2015)

The audio launch of the film was held on 14 May 2015. Actor Srikanth was present as a chief guest. Aditya Music bagged the audio rights of the film. The audio was well received by the audience. But, due to the success of film Bahubali, they announced the release date as 24 July 2015.

=== Track listing ===
Track list
No.	Title	Lyrics	Singer(s)	Length
1.	"O Jaane Jaana"	Ramajogayya Sastry	Rahul Nambiar	3:08
2.	"Bullet"	Viswa	Saicharan Bhaskaruni	2:33
3.	"Arey Hello Hello"	Bhuvana Chandra	Ranjith	3:44
4.	"Sannajaji(Remix)"	Veturi	M. L. R. Karthikeyan, Divija Karthik	4:01
5.	"Ammoruthalli"	Ramajogayya Sastry	Simha	3:51
Total length:				17:17

=== Release ===
The movie was scheduled for a worldwide release on 26 June 2015. Later makers announced the release date as 24 July 2015.
