= Live Telecast =

2021 Indian television series by Venkat Prabhu

- Promotional poster
- Genre: Horror; Thriller
- Created by: Venkat Prabhu
- Written by: Venkat Prabhu
- Directed by: Venkat Prabhu
- Starring: Kajal Aggarwal; Vaibhav; Anandhi; Ashwin Kumar Lakshmikanthan; Daniel Annie Pope; Priyanka Nair
- Theme music composer: Premgi Amaren
- Composer: Premgi Amaren
- Country of origin: India
- Original language: Tamil
- No. of seasons: 1
- No. of episodes: 7

Production
- Producer: V Rajalakshmi
- Production location: India
- Running time: 29-41 minutes
- Production company: Black Ticket Company

Original release
- Network: Disney+ Hotstar
- Release: 12 February 2021

Live Telecast is a 2021 Indian Tamil-language horror thriller television series written and directed by Venkat Prabhu and starring Kajal Aggarwal, Vaibhav, Anandhi, Ashwin Kumar Lakshmikanthan, Daniel Annie Pope and Priyanka Nair. The series is set in the backdrop of 2005 and the title card also portrays a diary indicating the year 2005. It premiered on Disney+ Hotstar on 12 February 2021.

== Premise ==
The series revolves around Jennifer Matthew (Kajal Aggarwal) and her television production crew who are temporarily residing in a house for filming a reality TV show. However things take a turn as they come to know that the house is haunted and stuck in the paranormal activity.

The story revolves around a group of college friends, Jenny, Ashwin, Aravind, Kanan, Selma, Saleem, Volga, Kalai, and Shekhar who work on a reality show 'Dark Tales' on Nam TV. The format of the show parodies the controversial Tamil talk show Solvathellam Unmai, where common people discuss their intimate family matters. But, Dark Tales invites people to share their brush with paranormal activities. Before the victims are invited to the stage amid a lot of cheering and applause, the audience is treated to a clumsy re-enactment of the ordeal of the survivors. The show's host Aravind (Daniel Annie Pope) has no empathy for his guests who have opened up about their worst experiences. He approaches the show with a gleam of sunshine and joy, contradicting the very dark theme of the show.

Jennifer (Kajal Agarwal) is a selfish, TRP-hungry woman whose lack of moral responsibility to promote scientific temperament among her audience is her biggest gift. She feels no guilt in reinforcing people's superstitions to drive up the ratings of her show. And she succeeds, as Dark Tales tops the TRP chart. The show's writer, Kanan, has a problem with her habit of distorting facts and confronts her but Jenny brushes all his warnings off and tells him that they are giving the public what they want: interesting content.

== Plot ==
The story opens with the team attending the success party of the show Dark Tales, where we are introduced to all the members. Kanan, the show's writer is in love with Selma, the AD but does not have the courage to confess to her. Kalai, the costume and makeup artist and Shekhar, the art director were in relationship until Shekhar flirted with a model on a soap ad set which Kalai witnessed and broke up with him. Ashwin is in love with Jenny and had tried to confess to her in the past but she brushed him off, as always. Volga is the producer of the show. The team is enjoying the party when Aravind receives a call from an unknown number and rushes to Jenny, asking her to switch on the TV. A big screen actress, whom they had previously rejected for a role, is going to debut in a soap opera at the same time slot as theirs.

“Is she so jobless, that she started acting in television?,” mocks Jennifer while watching the promo. She assures her friends that this is not going to affect their show and they will remain number 1. However, a few days later the soap opera's higher views threaten Dark Tales and Jennifer's lack of responsibility hits a new low. She gets her cast members to re-enact a scene, where a woman is raped by an invisible force (probably copied from Hindi movie Hawa). All hell breaks loose, as the channel and advertisers pull the plug on her show. The social media users also start a protest, joined later by Mahila Morcha demanding to ban the show.

“Our people have no taste to appreciate a show of international standard,” rues Jennifer. As she is under the illusion of her ingenuity and stupidity of people, she gets another golden idea. She decides to capture a ghost on tape and broadcast it live on her channel. The team goes to Ram with the script and asks for a last chance. He grants them permission as the other show's numbers are dwindling as well.

Jennifer and her team get to know about a house where the family is going through similar demonic situations. They check out the location and they finalise it. A women (Shenbagham) with one son and one daughter (Oviya) lives in that house. Shenbagham is a tailor and her husband is working as a driver abroad. Oviya is going to school whereas her brother stays home because of mental issues. Shenbhagam tells the team that her son cannot remember the faces of people and mentions that if he sees any new face, he will start crying. The entire team prepares the location for shoot by adding extra properties to the location.

Meanwhile, Kalai (Anandhi) and Shekhar (Vaibhav Reddy) are in a relationship. The team plans to telecast it live so that people believe it completely. However they also appoint two actors in case the ghost doesn't show up, they can use them as plan B so that the show is saved. However nothing happens as planned. Hence they go with plan B that is actors pretending to be a ghost. Suddenly a ghost appears and the actor who came to act as ghost gets possessed. After that every one is locked in the room and if they escape forms the remaining part of the story.

== Cast ==
- Kajal Aggarwal as Jennifer Matthew (Jenny) - Director of Dark Tales
- Vaibhav as Shekhar — Art Director
- Anandhi as Kalaivaani (Kalai), Shekhar's girlfriend — Costume and makeup artist
- Ashwin Kumar Lakshmikanthan as DOP Ashwin, had one sided love on Jenny — Cameraman
- Daniel Annie Pope as VJ Aravind — Host
- Priyanka Nair as Shenbagam
- Selva as ACP Guru
- Subbu Panchu as Micheal Arputharaj (Mike) - Executive Editor
- Premgi Amaren as Bigil Sathya
- Ashwin Kakumanu as Chinna — Ghost
- Samuthirakani as Deva
- Baby Nainika as Nila
- Sriranjani as Chinna's mother
- Akash Nath Vignesh (viki)
- Blade Shankar as Krishna
- Shiv Nadar as Mohamed Saleem — Senior Editor
- Subha as Selma — Assistant Director
- Hari as Kannan Ranganathan, Selma's boyfriend — Writer
- Mallika as Volga — Producer
- Disha Prabhuram as Oviya, Shenbagam's daughter
- S. Shashank as Sri, Shenbagam's son and Chinna's friend
- S. N. Surendar as Kalai's father
- Baby George as Kalai's mother
- Navya Suji as Prema
- Karthik Raj as Karthick, Prema's boyfriend

== Episodes ==
No.	Title	Directed by	Written by	Original release date
1	"Introduction"	Venkat Prabhu	Venkat Prabhu	12 February 2021
2	"The Failure"	Venkat Prabhu	Venkat Prabhu	12 February 2021
3	"The Prep"	Venkat Prabhu	Venkat Prabhu	12 February 2021
4	"The Show"	Venkat Prabhu	Venkat Prabhu	12 February 2021
5	"The Trap"	Venkat Prabhu	Venkat Prabhu	12 February 2021
6	"The Escape"	Venkat Prabhu	Venkat Prabhu	12 February 2021
7	"The Climax"	Venkat Prabhu	Venkat Prabhu	12 February 2021

== Production ==
Venkat Prabhu revealed that he wrote the script in 2005 which was supposed to be used as a dream project in his debut directorial film, but the project got shelved after film producer and his longtime friend S. P. Charan stated that the budget will not be feasible enough for a feature film. Prabhu wrote another new script for Charan, which became the sports comedy film Chennai 600028, and also his directorial debut.

In 2010, Prabhu had plans to revive his maiden script. He initially narrated the script to actor Vijay, who later expressed his interest in financing the project. After the success of Mankatha, both parties discussed about the project, but eventually failed to materialise due to their other commitments. Later, Prabhu decided to convert the relevant film script to a television series narrative.

This project also marked the OTT debut for both Venkat Prabhu and Kajal Aggarwal. Prabhu revealed that the reason behind casting Aggarwal is due to her pan-Indian image. In an interview, Prabhu stated that the script does not resemble the American streaming series Stranger Things, which is based on paranormal activities but it will be related to the people of rural areas in Tamil Nadu.

The series was shot entirely at an isolated location at the director's friend's house. The shooting of the series took place in October 2019 and completed within the same month. The series was reported to be distributed by Disney+ Hotstar and on 23 October 2020, the series was titled as title as Live Telecast and Disney+ Hotstar announced its release on the first state of their Tamil Hotstar Originals.

== Soundtrack ==
A song from the series titled "Aarariro" was composed by Premgi Amaren, with lyrics by Aishwarya M and sung by Vaikom Vijayalakshmi. It was released by actor Sivakarthikeyan on 5 February 2021.

No.	Title	Lyrics	Singer(s)	Length
1.	"Aarariro"	Aishwarya M	Vaikom Vijayalakshmi	3:02

== Release ==
Following the announcement of the series, its teaser was unveiled on 24 October 2020. The trailer of Live Telecast was released on 29 January 2021, which announced the release date of 12 February 2021. It was premiered through Disney+ Hotstar in Tamil and dubbed in Telugu, Malayalam, Kannada, Hindi, Bengali and Marathi languages.

== Reception ==
Manoj Kumar R of The Indian Express wrote "Venkat Prabhu is out of his depth as he seems to have exhausted his creative well in putting together a web show that tries to marry hunger for TRPs with the horror genre." Srivatsan S of The Hindu wrote "The series is hell-bent on effects rather than emotion. You wonder if someone else had ghost-directed Live Telecast by retaining Venkat Prabhu's spirit." Karthik Keramalu of The Quint wrote "Despite the largeness of the house you see in Live Telecast, it's bereft of the ghost's footprints – not footprints in general, but the parts that make up the ghost, like what makes it a scary entity." Nandini Ramanath of Scroll.in wrote "Live Telecast resorts to humour every now and then to relieve the tedium. When the jokes too begin to fall flat, it's time to move towards the exit, only to learn that it is barred by the ghost." Janani K of India Today wrote "Kajal Aggarwal's maiden web series [sic] Live Telecast, directed by Venkat Prabhu, gives us a been-there-seen-that feeling throughout."

The critic from The Times of India wrote "While Live Telecast isn't bad per se, given the talents involved, it is a disappointment. The plot-centric writing wouldn't have been a major issue in a two-hour film, but here, the plotting hits expected notes in expected ways. In his defence, Venkat Prabhu has revealed that he had written this story much before his debut Chennai 600028, but this very fact should have made the makers wary as by now, we have seen so many horror-coms of this ilk as feature films. Yes, the director does acknowledge Hollywood and Korean horror influences in the dialogues but being self-aware cannot take away the predictability of the script." Ranjani Krishnakumar of Firstpost wrote "The worst part of Live Telecast, though, is that Venkat Prabhu has no sensitivity regarding what his creation means and does. As it progresses, the show's absolute lack of any critical thought laughs at our face. Workplace sexual harassment, voyeurism of the TV viewing public, violence against women, extra-judicial killing by the police — all of them come and go, superficially, without thought or any serious exploration."
