= Mr. Perfect (film) =

2011 Indian film by Dasaradh

- Film poster
- Directed by: Dasaradh
- Written by: Abburi Ravi (dialogues)
- Screenplay by: Hari Krishna; Praveen Varma
- Story by: Dasaradh
- Produced by: Dil Raju
- Starring: Prabhas; Kajal Aggarwal; Taapsee Pannu
- Cinematography: Chota K. Naidu
- Edited by: Marthand K. Venkatesh
- Music by: Devi Sri Prasad
- Production company: Sri Venkateswara Creations
- Release date: 22 April 2011
- Running time: 145 minutes
- Country: India
- Language: Telugu
- Box office: ₹32 crore distributors' share

Mr. Perfect is a 2011 Indian Telugu-language romantic drama film directed by Dasaradh, and produced by Dil Raju under Sri Venkateswara Creations. The film features Prabhas, Kajal Aggarwal and Taapsee Pannu alongside Murali Mohan, Prakash Raj, Nassar, Sayaji Shinde and K. Vishwanath. The music is composed by Devi Sri Prasad. The film follows Vicky (Prabhas), who never compromises in his life, a principle that he has adhered to since childhood. He breaks off his engagement with Priya (Kajal) after he learns that she is making many compromises for his sake. However, time makes him realize the need for compromises in life.

Mr. Perfect was released theatrically on 22 April 2011 to positive reviews and went on to be successful at the box office, emerging as Prabhas's highest grosser up until that point, collecting a distributor's share of over ₹32 crore at the box office. It also became the second highest-grossing Telugu film of 2011. The film won the newly incorporated Nagi Reddy Memorial Award for "Best Telugu Family" entertainer for the year 2011. It received 6 nominations at the 59th Filmfare Awards South.

The film was re-released in Japan in May 2024, with every show selling out.

== Plot ==
Vicky, a successful entrepreneur running a video game development firm in Australia, adheres to a strict lifelong philosophy of absolute non-compromise. He firmly believes that individuals must remain unapologetically themselves within a relationship rather than altering their core personality traits to accommodate a partner. While he aggressively advocates this rigid mindset among his peers, it creates an ongoing conflict with his father, who consistently advises him that mutual adjustment is essential for collective happiness.

Concurrently in India, Vicky's parents arrange his alliance with Priya, a compassionate physician and his childhood friend. The two are diametrically opposed: Vicky is fiercely individualistic and modern, whereas Priya is traditional, conservative, and always willing to sacrifice her personal preferences for the joy of others. Their initial interactions are characterized by mutual friction and petty practical jokes. However, following her father's guidance, Priya adopts a more positive outlook toward Vicky and gradually falls deeply in love with him. To align with his lifestyle, she systematically alters her own identity, abandoning her passion for classical dance, eating non-vegetarian cuisine, and adopting contemporary attire.

Reciprocating her affection, Vicky agrees to the wedding. However, his convictions are severely shaken when he learns that his close friend, Shiva, is undergoing a bitter divorce caused by the long-term resentment of excessive marital compromises. Upon realizing that Priya has completely sublimated her own identity for his sake, a disturbed Vicky calls off the wedding, arguing that a relationship built on forced modifications cannot survive, and abruptly returns to Australia.

Back in Melbourne, a compatibility survey matches Vicky with Maggie, a free-spirited, modern woman who entirely shares his uncompromising approach to life. The two begin dating and quickly decide to wed. However, Maggie’s father is Dubey, a disgruntled corporate rival whom Vicky had previously humiliated in a business dispute. Dubey vehemently opposes the union but eventually proposes a challenge: Vicky must stay at their ancestral home for four days during Maggie's sister’s wedding and successfully win the approval of her extended family. Confident in his principles, Vicky adds a condition of his own, stating that if even a single relative remains unconvinced, he will willingly walk away from Maggie.

To Vicky’s shock, Priya arrives at the venue from India, as she is a cousin of the groom. Witnessing Vicky's predicament and prioritizing his happiness, Priya selflessly assists him in navigating the complex family dynamics. Through her behind-the-scenes guidance, Vicky effortlessly wins over the entire household. However, during this process, Vicky unwittingly breaks his own rules; he intentionally loses a game to reconcile two estranged brothers and forces himself to consume sweets he dislikes, executing the exact behavioral adjustments he previously condemned. Heartbroken at the certainty of his marriage to Maggie, Priya quietly returns to India the night before the challenge concludes.

Left alone, Vicky discovers an old, unread video message on his phone that Priya had recorded before his initial rejection, in which she passionately details her unconditional love for him. Watching it alongside his recent experiences, Vicky experiences a profound paradigm shift. He finally recognizes that genuine love requires voluntary compromise and that his absolute refusal to adapt was a sign of emotional immaturity.

Gathering the wedding guests, Vicky publicly acknowledges his flaws, explains his realization regarding the necessity of compromise, and amicably cancels his wedding to Maggie, who understands and respects his choice. Vicky immediately flies to India to win Priya back. Although Priya and her protective family initially subject him to playful indifference to test his sincerity, Vicky persists with his reformed, adaptive attitude. Convinced of his genuine transformation, Priya happily accepts his love.

== Cast ==
- Prabhas as Vicky
- Kajal Agarwal as Priya
- Taapsee Pannu as Maggie Dubey
- Murali Mohan as Rao, Priya's father
- Nassar as Vicky's father
- Prakash Raj as Dubey, Maggie's father
- Bramhanandam as Jalsa Kishore (maternal uncle of Priya)
- Raghu Babu as Dubey’s Brother in law
- Sayaji Shinde as Priya’s uncle, CEO of MindGames,
- K. Vishwanath as Maggie's grandfather
- Tulasi as Vicky's mother
- Pragathi as Maggie's mother
- Sagar as Shiva
- Kaushal Manda as Priya’s cousin
- Sameer Hasan as Maggie's relative
- Sudeepa Pinky as Vicky's sister
- Master Bharath as Priya’s brother
- Satyadev as Vicky's friend
- Krishnudu as Krishna, Vicky's friend
- Akhil Karteek as Vicky's friend
- Raja Ravindra as Raja, Dubey's employee
- Banerjee as Priya's relative
- Prabhas Sreenu
- Rajitha

== Reception ==
Sify mentioned "Director Dasarath should be appreciated for his clean, family-oriented outlook, keeping under check all the elements that are not his forte. The screenplay is slow, but interesting, and remains unpredictable till the end of the film". Idlebrain.com mentioned " First half of the film is okay though the conflict point is revealed only in the interval block. Second half is predictable. The plus points of the movie are casting (Prabhas, Kajal & Tapsee), production values, cinematography and music".

The Statesman described the film as a "timeless classic". At the heart of “Mr. Perfect” lies a poignant narrative about sacrifice and self-discovery. As the protagonist navigates the complexities of love and relationships, audiences are drawn into a riveting journey of personal growth and realization. The Statesman quotes "What’s truly remarkable is the universal appeal of Prabhas, evident in the overwhelming turnout at Japanese theatres screening “Mr Perfect”.

== Soundtrack ==
Mr. Perfect

Soundtrack album by Devi Sri Prasad
- Released: 19 March 2011
- Recorded: 2011
- Genre: Film soundtrack
- Length: 32:59
- Label: Aditya Music
- Producer: Devi Sri Prasad

Devi Sri Prasad chronology
Manmadhan Ambu (2010)	Mr. Perfect (2011)	100% Love (2011)

The original score was composed by Devi Sri Prasad and the soundtrack for the film was released on 19 March 2011. Shreya Ghoshal won The Hyderabad Times Film Award in 2011 for best playback singing for her track "Chali Chaliga".

Track-List
No.	Title	Lyrics	Singer(s)	Length
1.	"Rao Gari Abbai (Be what you wanna be)"	Ananth Sreeram	Tippu	4:44
2.	"Chali Chaliga"	Ananth Sreeram	Shreya Ghoshal	4:57
3.	"Ningi Jaaripadda"	Ramajogayya Sastry	Mallikarjun	1:46
4.	"Dhol Dhol Dhol Bhaaje (Ghallu Ghallu Mani)"	Balaji	M. L. R. Karthikeyan, Anitha Karthikeyan	4:32
5.	"Mora Vinaraa"	G. Sathyamurthy	Priyadarshini	2:23
6.	"Aakaasam Baddhalainaa"	Ananth Sreeram	Sagar, Megha	4:08
7.	"Aggipulla Lanti"	Ramajogayya Sastry	Gopika Poornima	1:53
8.	"Badhulu Thochani"	Sirivennela Sitaramasastri	Karthik, Mallikarjun	4:11
9.	"Light Thesuko Bhaya"	Ramajogayya Sastry	Baba Sehgal, Murali	4:25
Total length:				32:59

== Awards and nominations ==
News	Category	Nominee	Result
59th Filmfare Awards South	Best Film	Mr. Perfect	Nominated
59th Filmfare Awards South	Best Director	Dasaradh	Nominated
59th Filmfare Awards South	Best Actor	Prabhas	Nominated
59th Filmfare Awards South	Best Actress	Kajal Aggarwal	Nominated
59th Filmfare Awards South	Best Supporting Actress	Taapsee Pannu	Nominated
59th Filmfare Awards South	Best Lyricist	Anantha Sreeram - "Chali Chaliga"	Nominated
1st South Indian International Movie Awards	Best Female Playback Singer (Telugu)	Shreya Ghoshal - "Chali Chaliga"	Won
Mirchi Music Awards South	Best Female Playback Singer	Shreya Ghoshal - "Chali Chaliga"	Won
Santosham Film Awards	Best Actress (Jury)	Taapsee Pannu	Won
Hyderabad Times Film Awards	Best Female Playback Singer	Shreya Ghoshal - "Chali Chaliga"	Won
Nagi Reddy Memorial Award	Best Telugu Family Entertainer	Mr. Perfect	Won

== Release ==
Mr. Perfect was released theatrically on 22 April 2011.

- The film was released in almost 800 theatres in Andhra Pradesh. It was also released across India, and overseas with 200 odd prints.
- It was dubbed into Tamil and Malayalam under the same title and later into Hindi under the title No.1 Mr. Perfect (by Goldmines Telefilms in 2013).

The film was re-released in Japan in May 2024.

== Home media ==
- The satellite rights were obtained by Gemini TV for ₹4.5 crore.
- The DVD was released by Aditya Videos on 10 September 2011, in NTSC video format for a purchase price of $7.99.
- The Blu-ray Disc was released by Aditya Videos on 20 October 2011, in NTSC video format and 5.1 Dolby Digital Surround audio format for a purchase price of $24.99.

== Plagiarism ==
Novelist Shyamala Rani has approached the court, claiming the storyline of Mr Perfect is based on her novel Naa Manasu Korindi Ninne and many scenes and the overall tone of the film also coincides with her writing. Shyamala Rani also claimed in April 2019 that the court has passed an interim judgement in favour of her.
