= Satyabhama (2024 film) =

2024 Telugu film

- Theatrical release poster
- Directed by: Suman Chikkala
- Screenplay by: Suman Chikkala; Sashi Kiran Tikka
- Story by: Ramesh Yadma; Prashanth Reddy Motadoo
- Produced by: Sashi Kiran Tikka; Bobby Tikka; Srinivas Rao Takkalapelly
- Starring: Kajal Aggarwal; Naveen Chandra; Prakash Raj; Nagineedu; Harsha Vardhan; Ravi Varma
- Cinematography: Vishnu Besi
- Edited by: Kodati Pavan Kalyan
- Music by: Sricharan Pakala
- Production company: Aurum Arts
- Release date: 7 June 2024
- Running time: 132 minutes
- Country: India
- Language: Telugu
- Budget: ₹10 crore
- Box office: ₹2.55 crore

Satyabhama is a 2024 Indian Telugu-language crime thriller film directed by Suman Chikkala and produced by Sashi Kiran Tikka, Bobby Tikka, and Srinivas Rao Takkalapelly. The film stars Kajal Aggarwal as the titular character along with Naveen Chandra, Prakash Raj, Nagineedu, Harsha Vardhan, and Ravi Varma. The music is composed by Sricharan Pakala with cinematography by Vishnu Besi and editing by Kodati Pavan Kalyan. The film released on 7 June 2024. It received negative reviews and became a box office bomb.

== Plot ==
ACP Satyabhama leads the special "SHE Teams" task force in Hyderabad, a police unit dedicated to tackling crimes against women. She is deeply committed to her high-stakes career, occasionally causing friction in her personal life with her supportive husband, Amar, a story writer who wishes to start a family. The narrative intensifies when a young woman named Haseena approaches Satya seeking protection from her abusive, drug-addicted boyfriend, Yedhu. Satya encourages the hesitant woman to file a formal FIR. However, that same night, Yedhu attacks Haseena while she is on a phone call with Satya. Despite Satya's frantic rush to reach the scene, she arrives too late, and Haseena is brutally murdered.

Haunted by intense guilt and trauma over failing to save the victim, Satya faces further distress when Haseena's younger brother, Iqbal, abruptly goes missing shortly after the incident. While her superiors consider the murder investigation closed once Yedhu flees, Satya refuses to let the case go. Disobeying senior orders from Commissioner Joseph, she takes up the missing person case independently, determined to find Iqbal as a way to seek personal and professional redemption.

As Satya conducts a rogue investigation across shadowy towns, she uncovers a complex criminal underbelly. What initially appeared to be a straightforward domestic abuse case spirals into a larger network involving digital crimes, chat windows, impersonation, an AI-incorporated illegal gaming network, and deep-web trafficking operations. Satya discovers that Yedhu himself was a pawn in a much larger, calculated scheme orchestrated by a man named Rishi.

In the climax, Satya traces the core conspiracy back to Rishi, only to find that Iqbal is already tracking him down to exact his own final act of vengeance. Satya arrives just in time to intervene, preventing Iqbal from committing a fatal mistake and successfully taking him into protective custody while exposing the extent of the destruction caused by the syndicate. By neutralizing the gaming and trafficking ring and bringing the main perpetrators to justice, Satya successfully rescues Iqbal and finally finds closure for her past trauma.

== Cast ==
- Kajal Aggarwal as Satyabhama "Satyam" IAS
- Naveen Chandra as Amarendar
- Prakash Raj as Joseph Raj IPS
- Nagineedu as Narayana Das
- Harsha Vardhan as Anand Rao
- Ravi Varma as MP K. Ramakanth Reddy
- Neha Pathan as Haseena
- Prajwal Yadma as Iqbal
- Sampatha as Divya
- Ankith Koyya as Rishi Reddy
- Anirudh Pavithran as Yedhu
- Payal Radhakrishna as Maya/Neha

== Release ==
=== Streaming rights ===
Satyabhama was released on Amazon Prime Video on 28 June 2024, and it was also released on Lionsgate Play on 21 March 2025.

== Soundtrack ==
The soundtrack and background score of the film was composed by Sricharan Pakala. The audio rights of the film were acquired by Aditya Music.

| No. | Title | Lyrics | Singer(s) | Length |
|---|---|---|---|---|
| 1. | "Kallara" | Rambabu Gosala | Shreya Ghoshal | 4:06 |
