= Bekkem Venugopal =

Indian film producer in Telugu cinema

Bekkam Venugopal
- Born: Hyderabad, India
- Occupations: Producer; Director
- Years active: 2006–present

Bekkam Venugopal is an Indian film producer who works in Telugu cinema. He ventured into film production under his production company, Lucky Media. He started his career with film Tata Birla Madhyalo Laila in 2006 as a producer and made other films like Satyabhama, Maa Ayana Chanti Pilladu, Brahmalokam To Yamalokam via Bhulokam, Mem Vayasuku Vacham and Prema Ishq Kaadhal. And his recent movie Cinema Choopistha Mava was a super-hit which is both commercial and critical hit.

== Filmography ==
=== As producer ===
Key
†	Denotes films that have not yet been released

Year	Title	Actors	Notes
2006	Tata Birla Madhyalo Laila	Sivaji, Krishna Bhagavaan	
2007	Satyabhama	Sivaji, Bhumika Chawla, Brahmanandam	
2008	Maa Ayana Chanti Pilladu	Sivaji, Meera Jasmine, Sangeeta	
2010	Brahmalokam To Yamalokam via Bhulokam	Rajendra Prasad, Sivaji, Aarthi Agarwal	
2012	Mem Vayasuku Vacham	Niti Taylor, Tanish	
2013	Prema Ishq Kaadhal	Harshvardhan Rane, Ritu Varma, Sree Vishnu	
2015	Cinema Choopistha Mava	Raj Tarun, Avika Gor	
2016	Naanna Nenu Naa Boyfriends	Hebah Patel	
2017	Nenu Local	Nani, Keerthy Suresh	
2018	Husharu	Tejus Kancherla, Tej Kurapati, Abhinav, Dinesh Tej	
2021	Paagal	Vishwak Sen, Simran Choudary	
2022	Alluri	Sree Vishnu, Kayadu Lohar	
2024	Roti Kapda Romance		
