= Yamagola Malli Modalayindi =

- Theatrical release poster
- Directed by: Srinivasa Reddy
- Produced by: Amar; Rajasekhar; Satish
- Starring: Srikanth; Venu Thottempudi; Meera Jasmine; Reema Sen
- Cinematography: K. Prasad
- Edited by: V. Nagireddy
- Music by: Jeevan Thomas
- Release date: 23 August 2007
- Running time: 166 minutes
- Country: India
- Language: Telugu

Yamagola Malli Modalayindi (transl. Havoc in Hell has happened again) is a 2007 Indian Telugu-language fantasy film directed by Srinivasa Reddy. Srikanth, Venu Thottempudi, Meera Jasmine, and Reema Sen play the lead roles. The film was a box office success. Director Srinivasa Reddy, Srikanth, and Meera Jasmine collaborated again for A Aa E Ee (2009).

== Plot ==
A baby girl is born into a rich family. The astrologers predict that she will become a noblewoman with a good heart who is socially committed to the suffering of others. They also say that the girl's family will become richer. She is named Aishwarya. But it is written in Yamaloka that the girl would die at a young age.

Running parallel to this story, at Yamaloka, an aging Yamadharmaraja wants to take rest, for which he proposes to throne his grandson Dharma Raju. Aging Chitragupta will take a rest, prompting his brother, Vichitragupta, to do his duties temporarily. Hence, the grandson of Chitragupta (Venu) gets ready to replace the old man.

Yama wants to test the talent of the young guys (who are shown as buddies). They are sent to Earth to take the life of Aishwarya. Young Yama falls in love with her. His buddy also falls in love with a police officer Vaijayanti. The love factor brings disrepute to Yama. Finally, the mortal love wins over Yamadharma.

== Cast ==
- Srikanth as Dharma Raju, grandson of Yamadharmaraja.
- Venu Thottempudi as Chitragupta, grandson of Chitragupta.
- Meera Jasmine as Aishwarya
- Reema Sen as Vaijayanti
- Allu Ramalingaiah as Chitragupta (graphics)
- Kaikala Satyanarayana as Yamadharmaraja, Pedda Yamudu
- Krishna Bhagvaan as Narada
- Chalapathi Rao as Indra
- Rajeev Kanakala as Indra
- Naresh as Aishwarya's father
- L. B. Sriram as Vaijayanti's father
- Sivaji Raja
- AVS as Vichitragupta
- M. Balayya
- Vijayakumar as Shiva
- Mallikarjuna Rao
- Ahuti Prasad
- Amar
- Sivaprasad
- Gundu Hanumantha Rao as Man in Hanuman getup
- Tirupathi Prakash
- Ramjagan
- Aditya
- Jackpot Suryam
- Potti Veerayya
- Ramesh Reddy
- Rammurthy
- Pragathi as Aishwarya's mother
- Kavitha
- Hema
- Ramya Sri
- Rajitha
- Banda Jyothi
- N. T. Rama Rao (archival footage from Yamagola)

== Soundtrack ==
Yamagola Malli Modalayindi

Soundtrack album by Jeevan Thomas
- Released: 2007
- Genre: Feature film soundtrack
- Length: 25:20
- Language: Telugu
- Label: T-Series Telugu
External audio
- Yamagola Malli Modalayindi – Jukebox on YouTube

The soundtrack was composed by Jeevan Thomas.

All lyrics are written by Bhaskarabhatla.

Track listing
No.	Title	Singer(s)	Length
1.	"Adukodaneke"	Surender Singh	4:14
2.	"Jalakdik Lajaa"	Mano	6:21
3.	"Gundelo Abbaba"	Udit Narayan, Shreya Ghoshal	4:14
4.	"O Apparao"	Murli	5:26
5.	"Uppu Kappuram"	Jassie Gift	5:05
Total length:			25:20

== Reception ==
A critic from Rediff.com wrote that "On the whole, the film is a good entertainer. Don't look for logic in the film, just sit back and enjoy!" A critic from Sify wrote, "Though the first half is entertaining, the second half is confusing, a bit vulgar and predictable".
