= Gehana Vasisth =

Indian actor and model

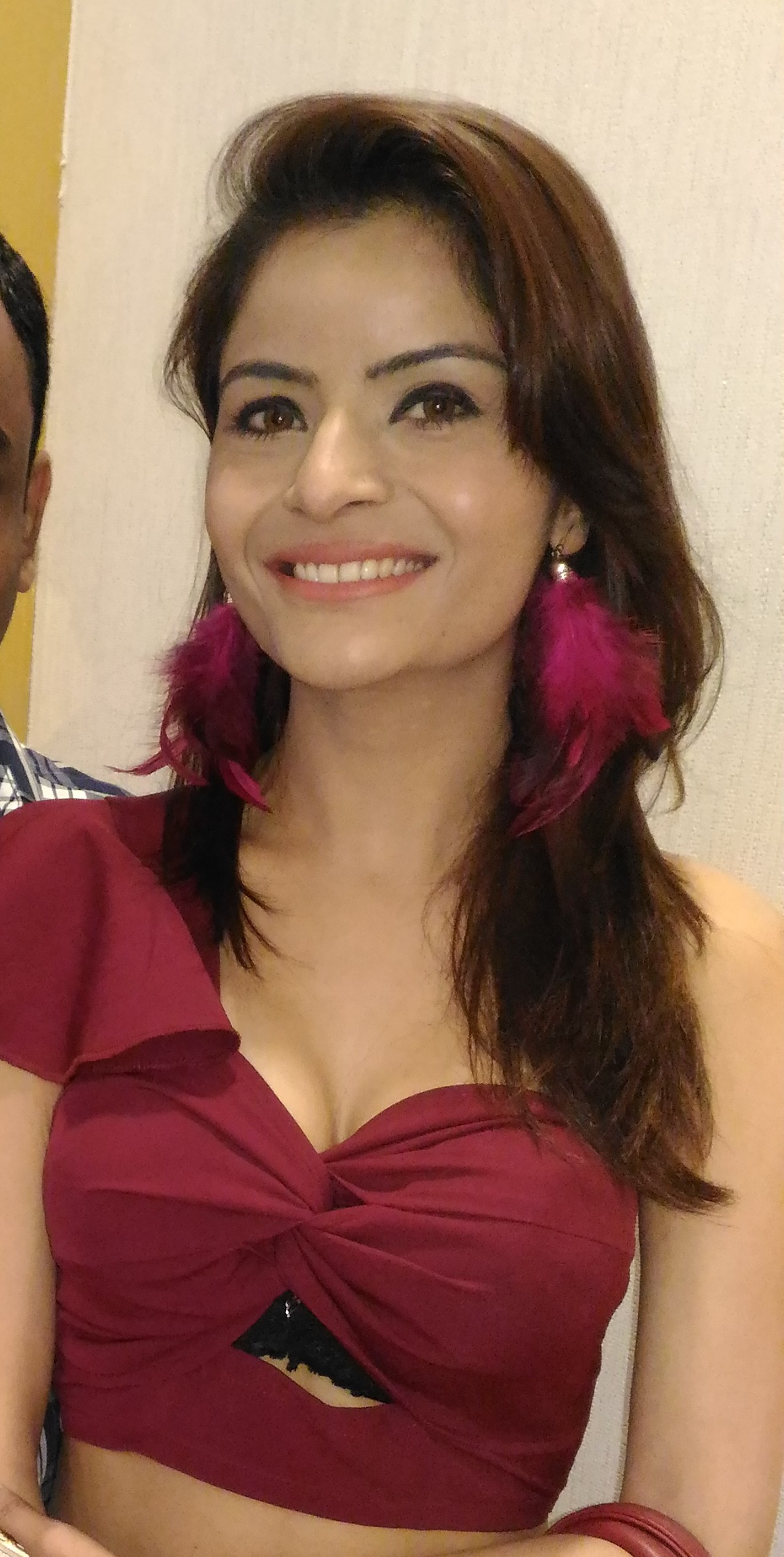
- Gehana Vasisth in 2018
- Born: Vandana Tiwari; Chirimiri, Chhattisgarh
- Other name: Vandana Vasisth
- Education: All Saints College, Bhopal
- Occupations: Actress; model; television presenter
- Years active: 2007–present

Vandana Tiwari known by her stage name Gehana Vasisth, is an Indian actress, model, and television presenter. After working for several brands as a model, she was crowned as Miss Asia Bikini.

== Early life and background ==
Vasisth was born in Chirimiri, Chhattisgarh. Her mother, Sita Vasisth was a gynaecologist and her father, Ravindra Vasisth was an education officer.

She has one younger sister Namrata and two younger brothers Nitish and Gaurav. Her friends call her by the nickname Zindagi.

== Career ==
Gehana worked as a model for many international brands. She did about 70 advertisements. She won the Miss Asia Bikini contest of 2012. She did more than 80 advertisements. She later entered the film industry through lead role in a film called Filmy Duniya and she also worked in few telugu films as a "item song". later she performed a handful of lead roles. Also, she has worked in many web series including Gandi Baat season 3 on Alt Balaji.

=== Television ===
She was introduced as an anchor in Sahara One Television Channel. Later she did a role in the serial Behenein on Star Plus and appeared as VJ on True Life show on MTV India.

== Filmography ==
Year	Film	Role	Language	Notes
2007	Operation Duryodhana	item song	Telugu	
2012	Daal Mein Kuch Kaala Hai		Hindi	
2013	Operation Duryodhana 2	Item song	Telugu	
2013	Filmy Duniya	Lead	Hindi	
2013	Anukunnadi Okati Ayyindi Okati	Lead	Telugu	
2014	33 Prema Kathalu	Item song	Telugu	
2014	Aidu 5	Lead	Telugu	
2015	Luckhnowi Ishq		Hindi	
2015	Namasthe	Lead	Telugu	unreleased
2016	Peigal Jaakkirathai	Item Song	Tamil	
2017	Btech Love story	Lead	Telugu	
2018	Unmaad	Item song	Hindi	
2020	The Promise	Telefilm	Hindi	
TBA	Indian Never Again Nirbhaya	special appearance	Hindi	Filming
TBA	Preminchu Pilladu	Item song	Telugu	Post Production
