= Ullasa Utsaha =

- Poster
- Directed by: Devraj Palan
- Based on: Ullasamga Utsahamga (Telugu) by A. Karunakaran
- Produced by: B. P. Thyagraju
- Starring: Ganesh; Yami Gautam
- Cinematography: G. S. V. Seetharam
- Edited by: Marthand K. Venkatesh
- Music by: G. V. Prakash Kumar
- Production companies: Kanthi Cini Productions; Amruth Amarnath Arts
- Release date: 30 May 2010
- Running time: 153 minutes
- Country: India
- Language: Kannada

Ullasa Utsaha (transl. Joyfully and energetically) is a 2010 Indian Kannada-language romance film directed by Devraj Palan, starring Ganesh and Yami Gautam. It also marked the Yami's acting debut. A remake of the 2008 Telugu film Ullasamga Utsahamga, it was released after a four month delay.

== Plot ==
Preetam, an irresponsible young man, falls for Mahalakshmi and tries to woo her. But Mahalakshmi, who is in love with her childhood friend Balaji, eventually asks Preetam to take her to meet her love.

== Cast ==
- Ganesh as Preetham
- Yami Gautam as Mahalakshmi
- Rangayana Raghu as Raghupati
- Sadhu Kokila
- Sharan as Mahesh Babu
- Karibasavaiah
- Kavitha as Mahalakshmi's step-mother
- Tulasi as Kamala
- Sihi Kahi Chandru as Driver
- Vithika Sheru (credited as Keerthi) as Geetha
- Mithra as Preetham's friend
- Mohan Juneja as Police Inspector
- R. G. Vijayasarathy

== Production ==
Ganesh decided to star in the Kannada remake of Ullasamga Utsahamga after watching the film. This film is produced by Thyagraju, the uncle of Yasho Sagar who played the lead in the original. Bollywood actress Yami Gautam made her debut with this film.

== Soundtrack ==
The soundtrack was composed by G. V. Prakash Kumar. Six songs were reused from the original. The song "Chalisuva Cheluve" was reused in Saguni (2012) as "Manasellam Mazhaiye".

Track listing
No.	Title	Singer(s)	Length
1.	"Chalisuva Cheluve"	Sonu Nigam, Saindhavi (unc.)	5:36
2.	"Hello Namastey"	Karthik	4:30
3.	"Love Made Nanne"	Naresh Iyer	4:56
4.	"Chakori Chakori"	Tippu, Rita Thyagarajan, Benny Dayal	4:47
5.	"Kanasinolage"	G. V. Prakash Kumar, Andrea Jeremiah	5:33
6.	"Laali Haada"	Karthik, Prasanna Rao, Prashanthini	3:09
7.	"O Prema Yaakadaru"	Karthik	4:24

== Reception ==
A critic from The Times of India stated that "While the first half is exhilarating, the second half is an excellent mixture of sentiments, romance and comedy". A critic from Bangalore Mirror said that "What works for the film is the strict adherence to a well worked out storyline and the comedy situations that are worked into it". A critic from Sify said that "For those who have already watched the original is strictly off limits unless you are die-hard fan of Ganesh". Shruti Indira Lakshminarayana of Rediff.com scored the film at 2.5 out of 5 stars and says "All in all, Ullasaha Uthsaha is a time pass, feel good romantic comedy. It is a onetime watch for Ganesh's diehard fans and for those of you who haven't seen the original". Ullasa Utsaha was a box office failure.
