= Mr. Errababu =

2005 Telugu film

- VCD Cover
- Directed by: K Kishore
- Written by: K Kishore; Nandyala Ravi (dialogues)
- Produced by: Sunil Chalamalasetty
- Starring: Sivaji; Roma
- Cinematography: K Dutt
- Edited by: Baswa Paidi Reddy
- Music by: Koti
- Production company: Euro Andhra Entertainment Pvt Ltd
- Release date: 28 April 2005
- Country: India
- Language: Telugu

Mr. Errababu is a 2005 Indian Telugu-language romantic drama film directed by K Kishore and starring Sivaji and newcomer Roma.

== Plot ==
The film follows Mr. Erra Babu (Sivaji) as he falls in love with London girl Pooja (Roma) in Lankapalli. Pooja's father Chakravarthy wants Pooja to be married to an NRI rich man. How Erra Babu and Pooja reunite form the rest of the story.

== Cast ==
- Sivaji as Erra Babu
- Roma as Pooja
- Nagendra Babu as Chakravarthy
- Sunil
- Satyanarayana
- Venu Madhav
- Krishna Bhagavan
- Raghu Babu
- Srinivasa Reddy
- Ahuti Prasad
- Sreeram Edida
- Amitha
- Rajya Lakshmi
- Vijayachander
- Chakravarthy Ramachandra
- Asha Saini (item song)

== Production ==
Chennai-based model Roma made her debut with this film. The film is produced by NRI Sunil Chalamalasetty and was shot in London and Rajahmundry.

== Soundtrack ==
Music for the film was composed by Koti.

Track listing
No.	Title	Singer(s)	Length
1.	"Khushi Khushiga"	Shalini	4:00
2.	"Yenduko Emoo"	KK	4:30
3.	"Mallepuvvula"	S. P. Balasubrahmanyam, Nithya Santhoshini	4:25
4.	"Chukkallara"	S. P. Balasubrahmanyam, Sunitha	4:19
5.	"Neeli Meghala"	Srinivas, Malavika	4:15
6.	"Maa Ooru Sonthuru"	Malathi	4:04
Total length:			25:33

== Reception ==
Jeevi of Idlebrain.com wrote that "When we have NRIs producing Telugu films, we expect a minimum quality in terms of storyline, treatment and aesthetics. But Euro Andhra Entertainments banner disappoints with such a mundane film executed in mediocre style". A critic from Sify wrote that "On the whole, this film lacks a good script and moves at snail pace. You can predict every other scene and offers little in the way of surprise in the climax". A critic from Indiaglitz wrote that "Shivaji's acting passes muster, Roma also acquits herself well. But why such a movie? After seeing the movie, the question rings like Satre's existentialist queries".
