= Ashok Kumar (Telugu actor) =

Telugu actor

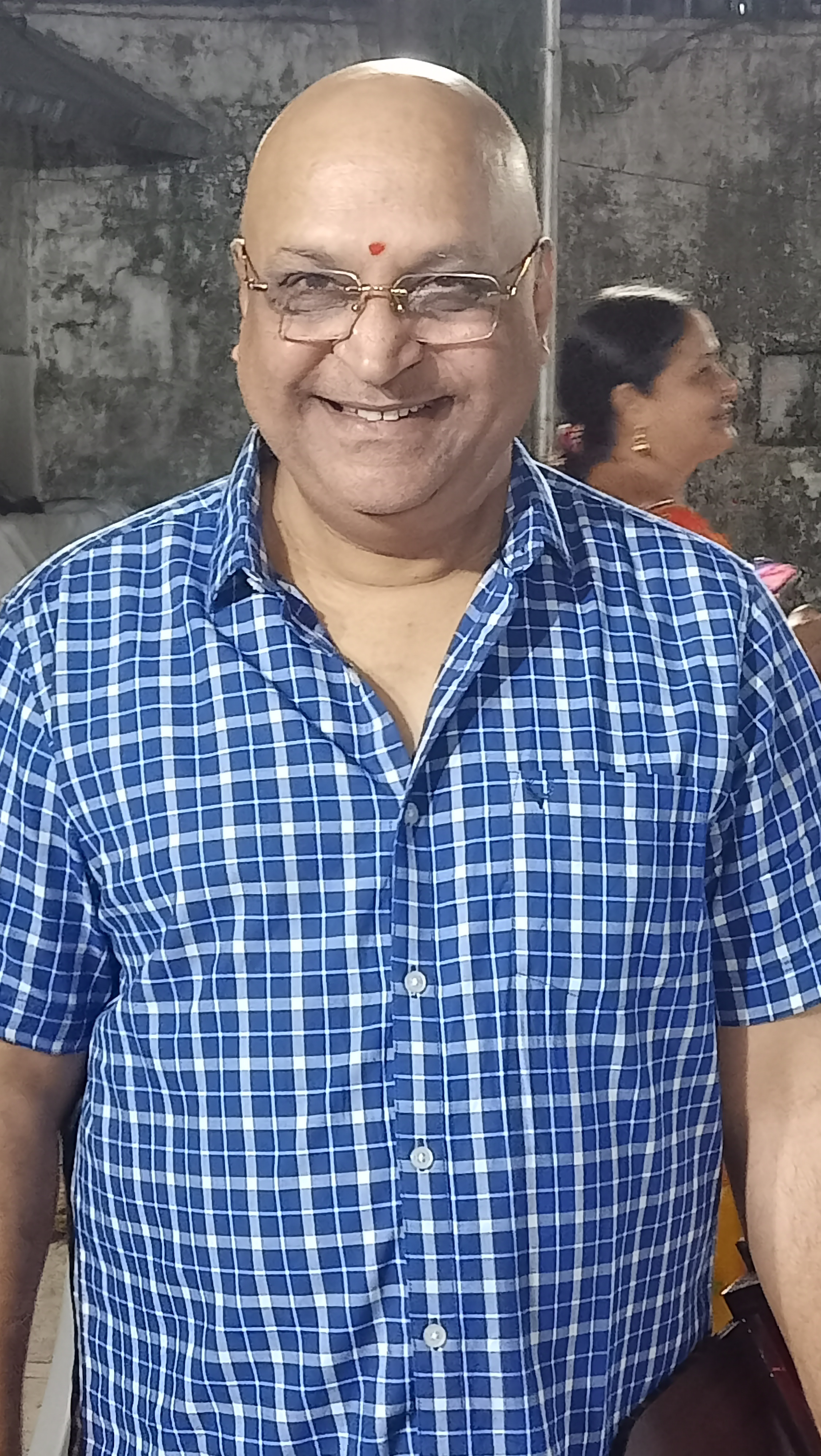
- Born: 1 June 1959
- Occupation: Actor
- Years active: 1985—present
- Children: 2

Ashok Kumar is a Telugu comedian and actor. He first appeared in Doordharshan-8. He acted in TV comedy serials and starred in films such as Vengamamba (2009) and Bejawada (2011).

== Career ==
Ashok Kumar was always interested in theatre. He studied law and became an advocate before starring in several films and serials.

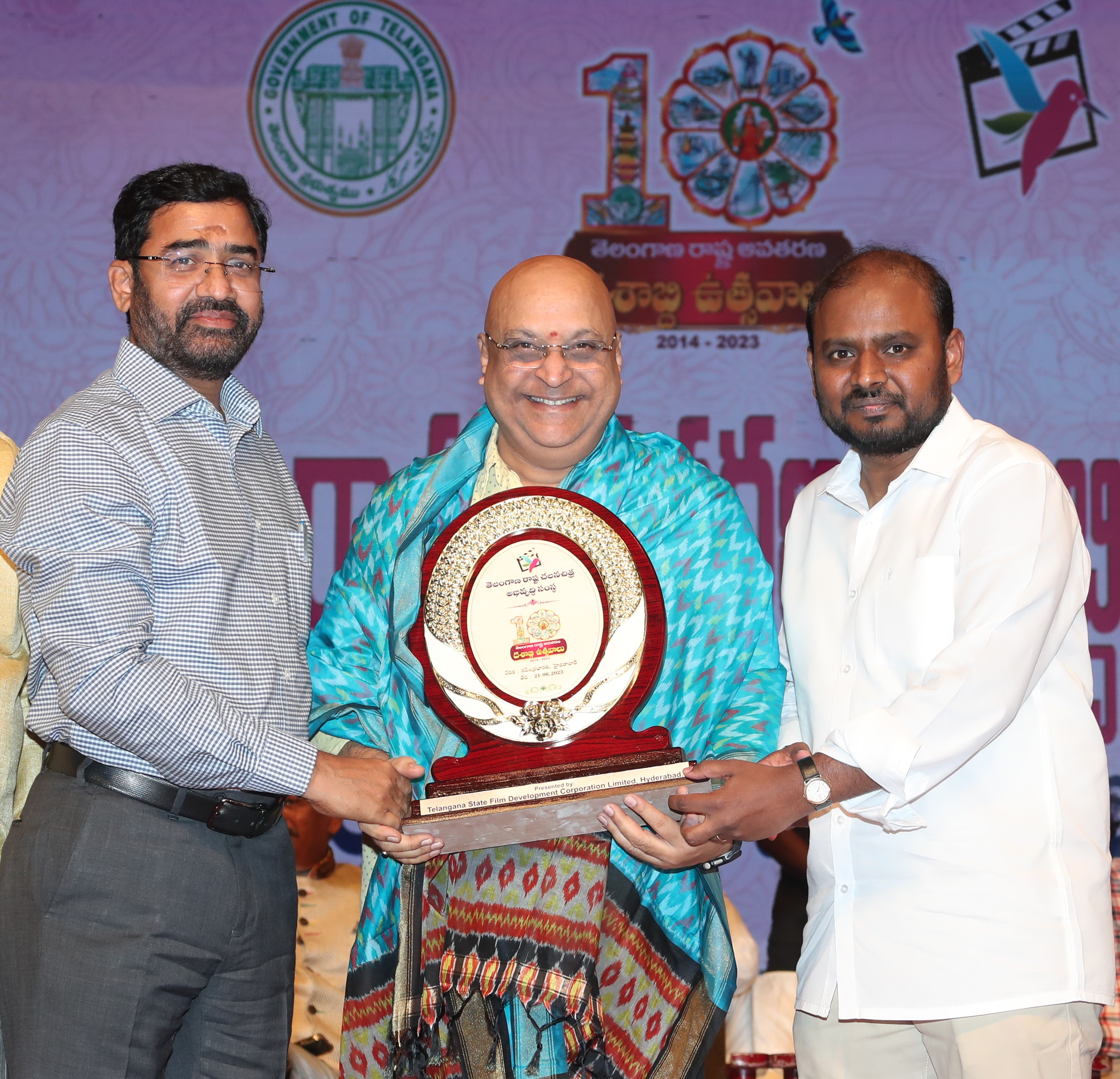
Ashok Kuma receives felicitaion from FDC chairman Anil Kurmanchalam and MD Korem Ashok Reddy on the eve of decennial celebrations of Telangana formation on 21 June 2023

== Filmography ==
- Aatmabalam (1985)
- Aha Naa Pellanta (1987)
- Veguchukka Pagatichukka (1988)
- August 15 Raatri (1988)
- Choopulu Kalasina Subhavela (1988)
- Hai Hai Nayaka (1989)
- Oorantha Golanta (1989)
- Dhruva Nakshatram (1989)
- Jayammu Nischayammu Raa (1989)
- Sutradharulu (1989)
- Prema Zindabad (1990)
- Raktha Jwala (1990)
- Irugillu Porugillu (1990)
- Raja Vikramarka (1990)
- Bharat Bandh (1991)
- Pelli Pustakam (1991)
- Tharaka Prabhuni Deeksha Mahimalu (1991)
- Brahmarshi Viswamitra (1991)
- Gang War (1992)
- Akka Pettanam Chelleli Kapuram (1993)
- Paruvu Prathishta (1993)
- Nannagaru (1993)
- Theerpu (1994)
- Pokiri Raja (1995)
- Real Hero (1995)
- Leader (1995)
- Alibaba Adbuta Deepam (1995)
- Osey Ramulamma (1997)
- Super Heroes (1997)
- Ratha Yatra (1997)
- Circus Sattipandu (1997)
- Subhavartha (1998)
- Sri Ramulayya (1998)
- Takkari Donga (2002)
- Law and Order (2002)
- Aithe (2003)
- Aayudham (2003)
- Seetayya (2003)
- Adirindayya Chandram (2005)
- Tata Birla Madhyalo Laila (2006)
- Samanyudu (2006)
- Gautama Buddha (2008)
- Nagaram (2008)
- Vandha Kotlu (2008)
- Ullasamga Utsahamga (2008)
- Maa Ayana Chanti Pilladu (2008)
- Vengamamba (2009)
- Subhapradam (2010)
- Aalasyam Amrutam (2010)
- Bejawada (2011)
- Sri Vasavi Vaibhavam (2012)
- Irandam Ulagam (2013; Tamil)
- Erra Bus (2014)
- Jyo Achyutananda (2016)
- Baahubali 2: The Conclusion (2017)
- Idi Naa Love Story (2018)
- Bluff Master (2018)
- Writer Padmabhushan (2023)
- Abhilasha (2023)
- Sound Party (2023)
- Prem Kumar (2023)
- Swag (2024)
- The Paradise (2026)
