= Srinivasa Reddy (director) =

Indian film director

- Born: 1969 (age 56–57); Velagala Vari Palem, Andhra Pradesh, India
- Occupation: Director
- Years active: 1997–present

S. Srinivasa Reddy is an Indian director who works in Telugu-language films.

== Career ==
Srinivasa Reddy worked under several directors from the Kannada and Telugu film industries before debuting as a director. In 1984, he first worked as an assistant director to Vijay. He worked as an assistnant director for the film Ankusam (1989) and worked under Y. Nageswara Rao and Siva Nageswara Rao. Reddy made Ashadam Pellikoduku (1997) with Ali and Adirindayya Chandram (2005) with Sivaji before getting a breakthrough with Tata Birla Madhyalo Laila (2006). The following year he went on to direct the multi-starrer Yamagola Malli Modalayindi (2007). That same year, he was attached to direct for a film produced by NRI Kishore Putta starring Srikanth, but the film did not enter production. In 2008, he directed Bommana Brothers Chandana Sisters, which was successful.

== Filmography ==
Year	Title	Notes
1997	Ashadam Pellikoduku	
2005	Adirindayya Chandram	
2006	Tata Birla Madhyalo Laila	
2007	Yamagola Malli Modalayindi	
2008	Bommana Brothers Chandana Sisters	
2008	Kuberulu	
2009	A Aa E Ee	
2012	Damarukam	
2015	Mama Manchu Alludu Kanchu	
2019	Raagala 24 Gantallo	
