= A Aa E Ee =

A Aa E Ee are vowel sounds of Indic scripts and may refer to:

- A Aa E Ee (2009 Tamil film), Indian film directed by Sabapathy Dekshinamurthy
- A Aa E Ee (2009 Telugu film), Indian film directed by Srinivasa Reddy
