= Operation Duryodhana (film) =

- Directed by: Posani Krishna Murali
- Written by: Posani Krishna Murali
- Produced by: Posani Krishna Murali; A. Mallikarjuna Rao
- Starring: Srikanth; Mumaith Khan
- Cinematography: Raja
- Edited by: Gautham Raju
- Music by: M. M. Srilekha
- Production company: Aman International Movies
- Release date: 31 May 2007 (India)
- Country: India
- Language: Telugu

Operation Duryodhana is a 2007 Indian Telugu political thriller film, loosely inspired by the 2005 sting operation of the same name. The movie was written and directed by Posani Krishna Murali starring Srikanth in lead role. The movie was a box office success, and Srikanth earned a nomination for Filmfare Best Actor – Telugu for his portrayal in the movie. The film was remade in Tamil as Thee. It was also dubbed into Hindi as Operation Dhuryodhana. An unrelated sequel to the film, Operation Duryodhana 2, released in 2013.

== Plot ==
Mahesh (Srikanth) is a sincere and honest police officer. He loses his kids and his wife gets paralyzed as few politicians who don't like his sincerity harm his family. Mahesh changes his appearance and name to join the gang of politicians to become one. The rest of the story is about how he makes people realize that there is some fault in the system.

== Cast ==
- Srikanth as Mahesh I.P.S. (Circle Inspector) alias Politician Bagavanthudu
- Krishna Bhagavan
- Brahmanandam
- Chalapathi Rao as Party President
- Kalyani as Mahesh's Wife
- Mumaith Khan as Party Secretary
- Nagendra Babu as Sincere Cop
- Paruchuri Gopala Krishna as master
- Venu Madhav
- Narra Venkateswara Rao as one of the MLAs
- Motkupalli Narasimhulu in a guest role as Chief Minister of Andhra Pradesh
- Dharmavarapu Subramanyam
- ETV Prabhakar as Traffic constable Teja
- Gehana Vasisth in a dance number
- Aparna
- M.S. Narayana

== Soundtrack ==
Music by M. M. Srilekha.

- "Rao Gari Annayya"
- "Ek Baar Dekho"

== Reception ==
A critic from Idlebrain.com wrote that "Posani Krishna Murali's work is far better compared to his earlier film Sravanamasam, but not good enough".
