= Adirindayya Chandram =

2005 Indian Telugu-language family drama film

- Poster
- Directed by: Srinivasa Reddy
- Written by: Nandyala Ravi (dialogue)
- Screenplay by: Srinivasa Reddy
- Story by: SP Creations Unit
- Produced by: Nukarapu Surya Prakasa Rao
- Starring: Sivaji; Laya; Sangeetha; Madhu Sharma
- Cinematography: Adusumalli Vijay Kumar
- Edited by: Gowtam Raju
- Music by: M. M. Srilekha
- Production company: SP Creations
- Release date: 20 August 2005
- Country: India
- Language: Telugu

Adirindayya Chandram is a 2005 Indian Telugu-language family drama film directed by Srinivasa Reddy and starring Sivaji, Laya, Sangeetha and Madhu Sharma. The film is an unofficial remake of the Kannada film Bisi Bisi (2004), which itself was based on the American film The Seven Year Itch (1955). The film was a box office success and ran for fifty days.

== Cast ==
- Sivaji as Chandram
- Laya as Rajyam
- Sangeetha as Paddu
- Madhu Sharma
- M. S. Narayana
- Brahmanandam
- Ali
- Mallikarjuna Rao
- Venu Madhav
- Duvvasi Mohan
- AVS
- Narra Venkateswara Rao
- Krishna Bhagavaan
- Raghu Babu
- Lakshmipati
- Kadambari Kiran
- Ashok Kumar
- Soma Vijaya Prakash
- Gemini Chandu
- Kallu Chidambaram
- Gautam Raju
- Bandla Ganesh
- Kamal
- Sarika Ramachandra Rao
- Srinivasa Reddy
- Gopal
- Viswanath Reddy
- Kavitha
- Rajitha
- Apoorva
- Padma Reddy
- Jayavani
- Baby Harshita
- Karate Kalyani
- Latha

== Production ==
The film's title was chosen after looking through sixty to seventy titles. Swathi Varma was replaced by Sangeetha and Madhu Sharma plays an important role.

== Soundtrack ==
All music is composed by M. M. Srilekha.

Track listing
No.	Title	Singer(s)	Length
1.	"Adirindayya Chandram"	Jassie Gift	3:19
2.	"Kallakunna"	Tippu	4:19
3.	"Aapalenandi"	Karthik, Srilekha	4:21
4.	"Maaripoyina"	Karthik	3:47
5.	"Nadumu"	S. P. Balasubrahmanyam	4:08
6.	"Chilipi Kanula Teeyani"	Hariharan, Kausalya	4:30
Total length:			24:24

== Reception ==
A critic from Idlebrain.com wrote that "On a while Adirindayya Chandram makes a below-average flick".
