= Kaikavolu =

- village
- Interactive map of Kaikavolu
- Coordinates: 16°56′18″N 82°07′49″E
- Country: India
- State: Andhra Pradesh
- District: Kakinada

Population (2001)
  - Total: 2,038

Languages
  - Official: Telugu
- Time zone: UTC+5:30 (IST)
- Vehicle registration: AP

Kaikavolu is a village in Kakinada district, Pedapudi Mandal, Andhra Pradesh, India.

== Demographics ==
According to Indian census, 2001, the demographic details of this village is as follows:

- Total Population: 2,038 in 575 Households.
- Male Population: 1,052 and Female Population: 986
- Children Under 6-years: 232 (Boys - 132 and Girls - 100)
- Total Literates: 1,055

== General information ==
- Telugu film actor Krishna Bhagavan was born in this village.
