= Tej I Love You =

- Theatrical release poster
- Directed by: A. Karunakaran
- Produced by: K. S. Rama Rao
- Starring: Sai Dharam Tej; Anupama Parameswaran
- Cinematography: I. Andrew
- Edited by: M. S. Rajashekhara Reddy (S. R. Shekhar)
- Music by: Gopi Sundar
- Production company: Creative Commercials
- Release date: 6 July 2018
- Country: India
- Language: Telugu
- Box office: est. ₹8 crore

Tej I Love You is a 2018 Indian Telugu romantic drama film directed by A. Karunakaran and produced by K. S. Rama Rao under Creative Commercials banner. It stars Sai Dharam Tej and Anupama Parameswaran in lead roles.

== Plot ==
Tej as a child goes to prison for killing a person to protect a woman, serving 7 years in a juvenile home. As a grown up Tej is a singer in crazy boys band. Tej is very attached to his family. He along with his sisters go home on summer vacation. In home, one of his sister's marriage is fixed within family. But Tej helps his sister to elope with her lover. The family then come to know Tej is the one who helped his sister to elope. All of the family is shocked to know the truth. Some of the family member insults Tej and his dead parents due to which the family is broke. He gets thrown out of the family as he goes against family values by breaking his sisters arranged marriage within family. Tej Moves to live with his so-called musician uncle.

He sees Nandini and falls in love at first sight. She has come to India to fulfill her mother's last wish and to find the person who saved her (who is Tej). Nandini and Tej help each other and Nandini falls in love with Tej. When she comes to tell him this, he is writing an exam. So she records "I Love you Tej" in a pen (which they bought together) and gives to the invigilator to give it to him. However, she incurs an accident as soon as she leaves the centre and is unable to tell him her feelings.

Due to an accident Nandini forgets a whole one year of her life, she also forgets Tej. Tej makes it seem like she was just part of the boys band. Nandini s father, who only wanted to know where the property papers that Nandini had taken to India were, comes to India after knowing about the accident. Nandini partially retraces her steps and finds about her enquires. She ultimately finds out that Tej is the person that saved her mother and thanks him; he refuses the property and gives it back to them. At the airport while returning, she finds the invigilator who returns the Pen to her and she finds out that she indeed loved him before and shows the same to him, and they profess their love to one another.

== Cast ==
- Sai Dharam Tej as Tej, Nandini’s love interest
- Anupama Parameswaran as Nandini, Tej’s love interest
- Jayaprakash as Tej's uncle
- Pavitra Lokesh as Tej's aunt
- Anish Kuruvilla as Nandini's father
- Surekha Vani as Sudha, Tej's aunt
- Prudhvi Raj as Sudha's husband
- Viva Harsha as Harsha
- Banerjee as Coach Murthy
- Bhavana Samanthula as Nandini's Mother
- Karthik Adusumalli
- Josh Ravi

== Soundtrack ==
The music was composed by Gopi Sundar and released by Aditya Music.

Tej I Love You

Soundtrack album by Gopi Sundar
- Released: 9 June 2018
- Recorded: 2018
- Genre: Soundtrack
- Length: 21:25
- Language: Telugu
- Label: Aditya Music
- Producer: Gopi Sundar

Gopi Sundar chronology
Jamba Lakidi Pamba (2018)	Tej I Love You (2018)	Pantham (2018)

Track list
No.	Title	Lyrics	Singer(s)	Length
1.	"Andhamaina Chandhamaama"	Sahithi	Haricharan, Chinmayi	3:43
2.	"Happy Happy Family"	Rambabu Gosala	Simha	4:38
3.	"Nachuthunnade Vachi"	Pothula Ravikiran	Haricharan	4:29
4.	"Adhe Kannu Needi"	Ramajogayya Sastry	Haricharan	4:41
5.	"Hello Pilla Sunlo Laila"	Rehman	Yazin Nizar, Madhumitha	3:54
Total length:				21:25

== Release ==
Tej I Love You was released worldwide on 6 July 2018.

== Critical reception ==
In its review of the film, The Times of India rated the film 2/5 and commented that: "Director Karunakaran made a splash in Tollywood as a love story writer-filmmaker with Tholi Prema. Twenty years later, however, he still seems to be stuck with a 'formula' of cinema that worked in the 1990s. In 2018, all you get is a lifeless love story. As an audience, you want a bit more than that."

123 Telugu rated the film 2.75/5 and considered that: "Tej I Love You is the same old love story which Karunakaran has made many a time in the past. There is nothing new which this film showcases. Bad songs, lack of interesting romance and forced elements sidetrack the film."

Hans India rated the film 2.25/5 and remarked that: "Rather than focusing on the main plot, the makers unnecessarily included a lot of elements in the movie. The first half completely is about the teasing game between the hero and heroine and the second half is all about how hero wins back his love."

Greatandhra rated 2.5/5 and wrote, "is an outdated romantic drama that tests the patience to the maximum. It lacks fresh ideas."
