= Vasu (film) =

- Theatrical release poster
- Directed by: A. Karunakaran
- Written by: Story & Screenplay: A. Karunakaran; Dialogues: Trivikram Srinivas
- Produced by: K. S. Rama Rao
- Starring: Venkatesh; Bhumika Chawla
- Cinematography: R. Ramesh Babu
- Edited by: Marthand K. Venkatesh
- Music by: Harris Jayaraj
- Production company: Creative Commercials
- Release date: 10 April 2002
- Running time: 147 minutes
- Country: India
- Language: Telugu

Vasu: Voice Of Youth is a 2002 Indian Telugu-language musical romantic comedy film co-written and directed by A. Karunakaran, and produced by K. S. Rama Rao under the Creative Commercials banner. It stars Venkatesh and Bhumika Chawla with music composed by Harris Jayaraj.

Vasu marked Venkatesh's 50th film as an actor. The film won two Nandi Awards.

== Plot ==
After graduation, Vasu runs a college canteen and a music school and teaches music for seven years to make his living. His father Rao is an IPS officer and wants him to appear for Civil Services examinations to take up an IPS career. However, Vasu has different plans for his future: he dreams of becoming a musician and singer.

One day, a young IPS officer, Subramanyam, comes to Vasu's place to seek Rao's blessings. He admits that Rao was his inspiration to become an IPS officer. Rao feels dejected that his son does not heed his advice to take civil service exams. Meanwhile, Vasu spots a beautiful girl, Divya, on the street. He plays every possible trick to woo her, but his plans backfire and make him look foolish in Divya's eyes.

Rao spots his son bashing up men in the streets and asks him to leave the house and stay outside, which he does. Divya goes to Vasu's place with her luggage as he is about to leave. Later, Vasu learns that Divya is the daughter of his father's childhood friend and sees this as an opportunity to get close to Divya. He returns home and promises not to touch music again and instead focus only on his studies, but he secretly pursues his musical ambitions.

Vasu passes the preliminary auditions of the Music Talent search conducted by Sony Music Company. When Rao spots the letter from Sony, he argues with his son and asks him to either stay home and study for IPS or leave to pursue his dream of becoming a musician. Meanwhile, Vasu and Divya fall in love, but they never express their feelings towards each other. Vasu's sister loves Divya's brother, and both parties' parents approve. It is also revealed that Divya had already agreed to marry a man named Manohar after seeing his photograph (this was before she met Vasu).

Vasu is on the stage to prove himself as a singer and musician in the final auditions of Sony Talent Search. Divya and Manohar are to marry the same day, and Vasu's sister is to marry Divya's brother. Vasu wins the prize at the audition and sits in a park mourning his heartbreak. Then, his father and sister arrive, and the former apologizes for his opinion of Vasu's career. It is revealed that Divya did not marry that day, along with Vasu's sister, as she loved Vasu. In the end, the lovers unite, and the two couples' marriages are rescheduled.

== Cast ==
- Venkatesh as A. Vasu
- Bhumika Chawla as Divya
- Vijayakumar as Commissioner Rao (Vasu's father)
- Manjula Vijayakumar as Kamala (Vasu's mother)
- Sunil as Balu
- Ali as Bill Gates
- Dharmavarapu Subramanyam as Sony Music Company Manager
- M. S. Narayana as Mula Shankar Rao
- Ranganath as Srinivasa Rao
- Brahmaji as ACP Subramanyam
- Achyuth as Vignesh
- Varsha as Radhika
- Duvvasi Mohan as Doctor
- Subbaraya Sharma as Lecturer
- G. V. Sudhakar Naidu as Goon
- Chitti Babu as Beggar
- Raghunatha Reddy
- Tanish as Arun's friend
- Jogi Naidu as Vasu's friend
- Junior Relangi as Doctor
- Anilraj as Arun
- A. Karunakaran in a cameo appearance as a watermelon seller in the song "Naa Prema O Cheliya"

== Soundtrack ==
Vasu

Soundtrack album by Harris Jayaraj
- Released: March 2002
- Recorded: 2002; By Harris Jayaraj; At Trinity Wave Station, Chennai
- Genre: Feature film soundtrack
- Length: 32:01
- Language: Telugu
- Label: Aditya Music
- Producer: Harris Jayaraj

Harris Jayaraj chronology
12B (2001)	Vasu (2002)	Samurai (2002)

Music composed by Harris Jayaraj in his Telugu debut. The music was released on ADITYA Music Company. (The audio got unanimous hit talk all over airplay and within 4 days of its release it had sold over 2 lakhs. The peppy number "Sportive Boys" topped the charts for many weeks.) The song "Paataku Pranam" is inspired from Michael Jackson's "Billie Jean".

Telugu Track listing
No.	Title	Lyrics	Singer(s)	Length
1.	"Nammave Ammayi"	Sirivennela Sitarama Sastry	Harish Raghavendra, K. S. Chithra	4:43
2.	"Paataku Pranam"	Potula Ravikiran	KK, Swarnalatha	6:11
3.	"Sportive Boys"	Sahithi	KK, Clinton Cerejo, Tippu	5:12
4.	"Padana Teeyaga"	Potula Ravikiran	S. P. Balasubrahmanyam	5:25
5.	"O Prema"	Potula Ravikiran	Devan Ekambaram	5:50
6.	"Vaale Vaale"	Potula Ravikiran	S. P. Balasubrahmanyam, K. S. Chithra, Karthik (humming) (unc.)	4:40
7.	"Naa Prema O Cheliya (Montages Music But)"	(unc.)	Premgi Amaren (unc.)	4:47
8.	"Stick Dance Bit"	—	Instrumental	1:25
9.	"Music Bit"	—	Instrumental	1:25
10.	"Interval Bang Music Bit"	—	Instrumental	1:08
Total length:				40:46

Vetri

Soundtrack album by Harris Jayaraj
- Released: 2002
- Recorded: 2002
- Genre: Feature film soundtrack
- Length: 34:10
- Language: Tamil
- Label: Ayngaran
- Producer: Harris Jayaraj

All tracks are written by Thamarai.

Tamil Track listing
No.	Title	Singer(s)	Length
1.	"Sporty Boys"	Tippu	5:12
2.	"Paattukku Pattu"	Karthik, Swarnalatha	6:05
3.	"Kanavil Kandene"	Devan Ekambaram	5:45
4.	"Thene Thene"	Karthik, Gopika Poornima	4:22
5.	"Nanba Vendum"	Harish Raghavendra, Janani, Swarnalatha	4:40
6.	"Paadava"	S. P. Balasubrahmanyam	4:46
7.	"Vetri Theme 1"	Instrumental	2:12
8.	"Vetri Theme 2" (Instrumental)		1:08
Total length:			34:10

== Reception ==
Jeevi of Idlebrain.com rated the film three out of five and wrote that "Karunakaran concentrated too much on the character of hero and did not really expand the role of heroine, which is very uncharacteristic of him (if we look the way he beautifully explored the roles of heroines in Toli Prema and Yuvakudu). That hero orientation for Vasu has robbed off the family story tag this film". Gudipoodi Srihari of The Hindu wrote that "Venkatesh is as ebullient as he has been in other films. Bhoomika has a limited role. But for the last part, where she encourages Vasu to take to music, her character remains passive. The comedy is worse, because of senseless and tasteless scenes". A critic from Sify wrote that "Director Karunakaran has tried to re-work his Tolliprema where career, love and affection to parents form the base of the story but in Vasu it has fallen flat! The only highlight of the film is the brilliant music of Harris Jayaraj. However Vasu lacks soul and style". Andhra Today wrote "Venkatesh in a novel get-up along with fine music and well conceived scenes make the movie special. Although the message is an old one, the director succeeds in narrating it neat and straight to the audience. The scenes with the hero and heroine are very entertaining. Major part of this success can be attributed to dialogues written by Trivikram".

Reviewing the Tamil dubbed version Vetri, K. N. Vijiyan of New Straits Times wrote "There are no surprises in the story and it is very predictable. The climax is also unbelievable".

== Awards ==
Nandi Awards

- Best Home Viewing Feature Film - K. S. Rama Rao
- Best Male Playback Singer - S. P. Balasubrahmanyam for "Padana Teeyaga"
