= Roti Kapda Romance =

2024 Indian Telugu-language film by Vikram Reddy

- Theatrical release poster
- Directed by: Vikram Reddy
- Written by: Vikram Reddy
- Produced by: Bekkem Venugopal; Srujan Kumar Bojjam
- Starring: Harsha Narra; Sandeep Saroj; Supraj Ranga; Tarun
- Cinematography: Santosh Reddy
- Edited by: Vikram Reddy; Santosh Reddy
- Music by: Score; Sunny M. R. Songs: Harshavardhan Rameshwar; RR Dhruvan; Vasanth G
- Production companies: Lucky Media; Meraki Films
- Release date: 28 November 2024
- Country: India
- Language: Telugu

Roti Kapda Romance is a 2024 Indian Telugu-language romantic comedy drama film written and directed by Vikram Reddy, and produced by Bekkem Venugopal and Srujan Kumar Bojjam. The film features an ensemble cast of Harsha Narra, Sandeep Saroj, Supraj Ranga, Tarun, Sonu Thakur, Nuveksha, Megha Lekha, Khushboo Chaudhary.

The film was released on 28 November 2024.

== Plot ==
The film centers around eight childhood friends who all live apart around the world and reunite to roadtrip around India.

== Cast ==
- Harsha Narra as Harsha
- Sandeep Saroj as Rahul
- Supraj Ranga as Vicky
- Tarun Ponuganti as Surya
- Sonu Thakur as Priya
- Nuveksha as Divya
- Megha Lekha as Swetha
- Khushboo Chaudhary as Sonia

== Music ==
The soundtrack is composed by Harshavardhan Rameshwar, RR Dhruvan and Vasanth G, whereas the background score is composed by Sunny M. R.. The audio rights were acquired by Saregama.

Track list
No.	Title	Lyrics	Music	Singer(s)	Length
1.	"Galeez"	Krishna Kanth	Harshavardhan Rameshwar	Rahul Sipligunj, P V N S Rohit	4:02
2.	"Oh My Friend"	Krishna Kanth	Harshavardhan Rameshwar	Karthik	3:15
3.	"Arere Arere"	Raghuram	RR Dhruvan	Kapil Kapilan	3:02
4.	"Vaddu Ra"	Kasarla Shyam	Vasanth G	Yashwanth Nag, Vasanth G	4:02
5.	"Arere Arere (Sad)"	Raghuram	RR Dhruvan	Sreerama Chandra	1:46

== Release ==
Roti Kapda Romance was initially scheduled to be released on 22 March 2024, but later had several release date announcements – April 2024, 2 August 2024, 4 October 2024, and 25 October 2024. It was then announced to be releasing on 22 November 2024, but was finally released on 28 November 2024.

== Reception ==
Sekhar Kusuma of Samayam Telugu gave a rating of 3 out of 5. Hindustan Times Telugu also gave the same rating.
