= Damarukam =

2012 Telugu-language film

- Theatrical release poster
- Directed by: Srinivasa Reddy
- Screenplay by: Srinivasa Reddy
- Story by: Veligonda Srinivas
- Produced by: R. R. Venkat
- Starring: Nagarjuna; Anushka Shetty; Prakash Raj; P. Ravishankar
- Cinematography: Chota K. Naidu
- Visual effects by: P. C. Sanath
- Edited by: Gautham Raju
- Music by: Devi Sri Prasad
- Production company: R. R. Movie Makers
- Distributed by: Vyshnavi Films (overseas)
- Release date: 23 November 2012
- Running time: 157 minutes
- Country: India
- Language: Telugu
- Budget: ₹35 crore

Damarukam (transl. A small two-headed drum) is a 2012 Indian Telugu-language action fantasy film written and directed by Srinivasa Reddy, and produced by R. R. Venkat on the R. R. Movie Makers banner. It stars Nagarjuna, Anushka Shetty, Prakash Raj, and P. Ravishankar. The music is composed by Devi Sri Prasad with cinematography by Chota K. Naidu.

The film was released in 2012 and opened to positive reviews from critics who appreciated Nagarjuna's performance and Naidu won Filmfare Award for Best Cinematographer – South. Damarakum went on to be a commercial success grossing over ₹71 crore at the box office with a distributor's share of ₹40.85 crore. It became the highest grossing film in Nagarjuna's career at the time of release and was the first time that a Telugu film featured graphics that lasted more than an hour.

== Plot ==
The protagonist of the movie is born with the divine grace of Lord Shiva, and the boy's parents are advised to name him Bal gangadhara as he is destined to accomplish a great work. During his childhood, bala faces a great tragedy as his parents and grandparents are killed by a huge black panther as they return from Kaasi. This incident leaves his younger sister, Sailu, paralyzed from the waist down (Sailu had a talent for dancing before this incident). bala then develops strong hatred toward Lord Shiva.

Meanwhile, the scene shifts to a demon named Andhakaasura. We see him performing a severe penance to obtain a boon from Lord Shiva. Lord Shiva blesses the demon with the boon that he will not interfere in the latter's attempt to sacrifice a virgin girl to obtain complete rulership over the three worlds. The demon is advised by his aged friend billa that the sacrifice must be made a month having two solar eclipses, in such a way that he has to marry the girl and sacrifice her before the solar eclipse ends. This will render the demon peerless and a master over all the five elements.

The story then shifts to bala, now an adult whose motive is to help people and take care of his bedridden sister. He falls in love with Dr. Maheswari on a visit to the hospital where his sister is being treated. There are many scenes where the atheist bala forces the people of his colony, who include Rudraksha, Ringu Raja, the President, and others, not to worship, on account of his childhood tragedy. Then, one day, Sailu tells her brother that she wants to die because of unbearable pain. Bala questions Lord Shiva about his condition and drives away in his car, only to meet with an accident. But Lord Shiva intervenes and saves him. Lord Shiva calls himself Shankar bhai, befriends bala, and goes to his home.

The demon chooses Dr. Maheswari as his target for the sacrifice and prevents the aghoraas (who arrive at the temple) from having access to Mahi, on the first solar eclipse day. Bala rescues Mahi from the Aghoraas, and Mahi's parents entrust Malli to take care of Mahi. Mahi's parents decide to have Mahi marry a relative, Raahul, who is to arrive from the US. This advice is given by a saint known to Mahi's family. On his arrival at the airport, Andhakaasura kills Raahul in the washroom, and possesses his dead body. Andhakaasura enters Mahi's home and kills the three dogs who guard Mahi. The demon also paralyzes Mahi's father, when he learns the truth about him. He also tries to kill bala and Mahi, on their way to a temple, but Lord Shiva intervenes by sending his divine mount, Nandi, who saves bala. This infuriates the demon, who feels that Lord Shiva has not kept his promise. He challenges the Lord, to which he replies that it was his duty to protect his devotee. The demon then decides to oppose Lord Shiva, so he kills the saint known to Mahi's family, impersonates him, and convinces bala, Mahi and others that is not a good person by faking his death at the hands to Shankar bhai. This makes bala angry at Shankar bhai, and he returns the ring of friendship to Shankar bhai.

Finally, bala convinces Mahi's family that Rahul is Andhakaasura. Then, the demon carries Mahi to the spot of sacrifice and prepares for the ritual. Meanwhile, Malli is advised by the Aghora chief to worship Lord Shiva, and he tells bala that the purpose of his birth is to destroy the demon and the means to do it, as he was the reason for the tragedy in bala's childhood and Lord Shiva saved him as Shankar bhai. bala confronts the demon and is initially defeated, but he heads skyward to get a blessing from Lord Shiva and finally destroys Andhakaasura by piercing him with the Trident given by Lord Shiva.

== Cast ==
- Nagarjuna as Mallikarjuna / Malli / Bala/ Bal Gangadhar
- Anushka Shetty as Maheswari / Mahi
- Prakash Raj as Lord Shiva / Sambhayya / Shankar bhai / Shankar ji / Maheshwara
- Ravi Sankar as Andhakaasura Rakshasa
- Ganesh Venkatraman as Rahul / Andhakasura
- Brahmanandam as Rudraksha
- M. S. Narayana as Vankara Satyam
- Devan as Vishwanath
- Avinash as Aghora's chief
- Brahmaji as Vishwanath's brother
- Priya as Parvati, Mallikarjuna's/Bala’s mother
- Sameer Hasan as Jaidev, Mallikarjuna's/Bala’s father
- Geetanjali as Vasavi, Mallikarjuna's/Bala’s grandmother
- Giri Babu as Rama Chandra Murthy, Mallikarjuna's/Bala’s grandfather
- Chandra Mohan as Chandram, Mallikarjuna's/ Bala’s friend
- Raghu Babu as Goke Ring Raju
- Krishna Bhagavan as Colony President
- Thagubothu Ramesh as Full Bottle Vasu
- Pragati as Rajeshwari
- Abhinaya as Sailaja / Sailu / Shailu as Mallikarjuna's/Bala’s younger sister
- Jeeva as Maayi / Billa / Billasura
- Pruthviraj as Ad Film Director
- Duvvasi Mohan as Duvvasi
- Ajay
- Kavitha
- Satya Krishnan
- Rajitha
- Sravan
- Kamal
- Prabhu
- Ramaraju
- Vijaya Rangaraju
- Apoorva
- Kalpana
- Lakshmi
- Aruna
- Amurtha Gowri
- Sruthi
- Archana
- Anitha
- Nandini
- Nancy
- Master Gaurav as Young Malli
- Charmy as Sakkubai (item number)

== Production ==
A film with Srinivasa Reddy as the director and R. R. Venkat as the producer was in talks since 2007. Nagarjuna had shown his six-pack abs for the first time in the movie.

This movie is the first Telugu film ever with over 70 minutes of special effects. A team of visual effects experts at Firefly Creative Studio have been working on the movie for over a year now. Firefly, the company which worked on special effects for films like Anji, Arundathi, Magadheera and Anaganaga O Dheerudu.

== Soundtrack ==
Damarukam

Soundtrack album by Devi Sri Prasad
- Released: 10 September 2012 at Shilpakala Vedika; Hyderabad
- Recorded: 2011–2012; Recorded and Mixed at "Brindavan – The Garden of Music"
- Genre: Feature film soundtrack
- Length: 34:32
- Language: Telugu
- Label: Aditya Music
- Producer: Devi Sri Prasad

Devi Sri Prasad chronology
Julayi (2012)	Damarukam (2012)	Sarocharu (2012)

The music was composed by Devi Sri Prasad and was released on Aditya Music.

The audio release was held on 10 September 2012 at Shilpakala Vedika in Hyderabad. Msn.com gave a moderate review stating "Devi Sri Prasad's 50th album is unique from his usual run-of-the-mill compositions, but not his best. As a fan of the composer, the listener will be satisfied, but as a music lover, one doubts if this album would live up to listeners' expectations." Musicperk.com rated the album 8.5/10 quoting "A must-listen album by DSP. Not a song to be left out".

Track listing
No.	Title	Lyrics	Artist(s)	Length
1.	"Omkaaram"	Jonnavittula	Venkat Sai	01:04
2.	"Aruna Dhavala"	Jonnavittula	Karthik	01:05
3.	"Nestamaa Nestamaa"	Bhaskarabhatla Ravi Kumar	Sri Krishna, Harini	04:56
4.	"Reppalapai"	Ramajogayya Sastry	Hariharan, K. S. Chithra	03:42
5.	"Dheemtana"	Karunakar, Jonnavittula (Mantras)	Shankar Mahadevan	02:08
6.	"Sakkubhaai Garam Chaai"	Ramajogayya Sastry	Suchith Suresan, Mamta Sharma	03:42
7.	"Laali Laali"	Chandrabose	Gopika Poornima	04:47
8.	"Bhoonabhotaalake"	Jonnavittula	M. L. R. Karthikeyan	02:02
9.	"Kanyakumari"	Sahiti	Jaspreet Jasz, Sunitha	04:31
10.	"Shiva Shiva Shankara"	Jonnavittula	Shankar Mahadevan	04:52
Total length:				34:32

== Release and reception ==
After much delays the film was released on 23 November 2012.

=== Critical reception ===
idlebrain.com jeevi gave a rating of 3/5 stating "First half of the film is good, Plus points of the film are Nagarjuna and the grandeur". DNA India gave the film 2.5 and Times of India gave 3.5 ratings. Rediff also rated 3/5 and said "This socio-fantasy is one-of-its-kind in today's times and can be watched once for the stunning visuals".

== Accolades ==
Ceremony	Category	Nominee	Result
60th Filmfare Awards South	Best Actor	Nagarjuna	Nominated
60th Filmfare Awards South	Best Actress	Anushka Shetty	Nominated
60th Filmfare Awards South	Best Supporting Actor	P. Ravi Shankar	Nominated
60th Filmfare Awards South	Best Lyricist	Jonnavithula (for song "Shiva Shiva Shankara")	Nominated
60th Filmfare Awards South	Best Female Playback Singer	Gopika Poornima (for Song "Laali Laali")	Nominated
60th Filmfare Awards South	Best Cinematographer	Chota K. Naidu	Won
2nd South Indian International Movie Awards	Best Cinematographer	Chota K. Naidu	Nominated
2nd South Indian International Movie Awards	Best Actor in a Supporting Role	Prakash Raj	Nominated
CineMAA Awards	Best Editor	Gautham Raju	Won
CineMAA Awards	Best Costume Designer	Payal	Won
CineMAA Awards	Best Fight Master	Vijay	Won
