= Kartoot =

- Directed by: Anil Dutt
- Story by: Anil Dutt
- Produced by: Anup Jalota and Sadhna Dutt
- Starring: Madalsa Sharma; Sahil Kohli; Piyush Ranade; Himani Shivpuri; Shubhangi Latker; Anup Jalota
- Cinematography: Anil Singh
- Edited by: Umashankar Mishra
- Music by: Anisadh
- Production companies: Anup Jalota Films & Kaushalya Films
- Release date: 11 November 2022
- Country: India
- Language: Hindi

Kartoot is an upcoming Hindi-language Indian drama film starring Madalsa Sharma, Sahil Kohli, Himani Shivpuri and Anup Jalota. The film is produced by Anup Jalota and Sadhna Dutt. The movie is scheduled to be released on 11 November 2022.

== Cast ==
- Madalsa Sharma as Nighar
- Sahil Kohli as Samir
- Piyush Ranade as Abhishek Pandey
- Dhiraj Rai as Ramesh
- Himani Shivpuri as Khala
- Shubhangi Latker as Farida
- Utkarsh Naik as Saban
- Pragya Mishra as Priya
- Anup Jalota as police commissioner
