= Madalsa Sharma =

Indian film and television actress (born 1991)

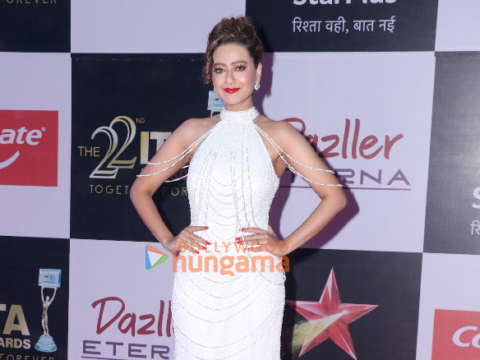
- Sharma in 2022
- Born: Mithi Sharma; 26 September 1991 (age 34); Mumbai, Maharashtra, India
- Other names: Madalasa, Maddalasa, Mithi
- Occupation: Actress
- Years active: 2009–present
- Known for: Anupamaa
- Spouse: Mahaakshay Chakraborty (m. 2018)
- Mother: Sheela Sharma
- Relatives: See Chakraborty family

Madalsa Chakraborty (née Mithi Sharma; born 26 September 1991), is an Indian film and television actress best known for portraying Kavya Shah in Star Plus's Anupamaa.

== Personal life ==
Madalsa Sharma was born to actress Sheela Sharma and film producer and director Subhash Sharma on 26 September 1991 in Maharashtra. After completing her schooling from Marble Arch school, she studied English literature at Mithibai College, Mumbai.

She became interested in acting as a career at an early age. She attended the Kishore Namit Kapoor Acting Institute and took acting lessons and learned dancing under Ganesh Acharya and Shiamak Davar.

She married Mahaakshay Chakraborty, son of Mithun Chakraborty, in 2018.

== Career ==
Madalsa made her acting debut in the 2009 Telugu film Fitting Master by E.V.V. Satyanarayana. The film was a success and Madalsa's performance was appreciated. The next year she made her debut in the Kannada film industry with Shourya, which gave a great boost to Madalsa's career. Also in 2010 she was seen in another Telugu film, Aalasyam Amrutam, under the banner of Suresh Productions. D. Rama Naidu chose Madalsa as the leading lady for the film. The film only did well at the box office but also took Madalsa's career to another level. She received positive comments for her performance in the film.

Her maiden Bollywood film Angel, by choreographer Ganesh Acharya, was released in February 2011. The film received great comments and Madalsa's performance was the talk of the town. Soon after was another Telugu release, Mem Vayasuku Vacham and her role was well received. The Times of India wrote that she "plays the eye candy very well."

Later in 2014, her second Hindi film, Sooraj Barjatya Rajshri Productions' Samrat & Co. released. The film received very good reviews overall. Samrat & Co. was a great relaunch for Madalsa in Bollywood. This was followed by Chitram Cheppina Katha, Telugu actor Uday Kiran's last film. In April 2014, she had stated that she has been working on three Telugu projects.

In 2017 Madalsa made her digital debut through music video titled Dhokha opposite Ganesh Acharya, Single by Rimesh Raja.

In 2020 she made her television debut by portraying Kavya Shah in Star Plus's Anupamaa. She quit the series after 4 years in September 2024.

In December 2021 Madalsa featured in Butterfly opposite Namit Khanna, sung by Dev Negi and Swati Sharma.

In May 2022, Madalsa reprised her role of Kavya Gandhi in Anupamaa's prequel web-series Anupama: Namaste America's last episode.

In 2023, Madalsa starred in Sudhanshu Pandey's solo single Dil Ki Tu Zameen.

Sharma quitted Anupamaa in September 2024, soon after exit of her co-actor Sudhanshu Pandey due to her reduced screen presence after turning her character Kavya positive.

== Filmography ==
=== Films ===
Year	Title	Role	Language	Ref.
2009	Fitting Master	Meghana	Telugu	
2010	Shourya	Shweta	Kannada	
2010	Aalasyam Amrutam	Vaidehi	Telugu	
2010	Thambikku Indha Ooru	Priya	Tamil	
2011	Angel	Sonal Mahajan	Hindi	
2012	Mem Vayasuku Vacham	Khushi	Telugu	
2013	Pathayeram Kodi	Bhoomika	Tamil	Dubbed in Hindi as Paisa Ho Paisa
2013	The Girl with the Indian Emerald	Mala	German	
2014	Patiala Dreamz	Reet	Punjabi	
2014	Samrat & Co	Dimpy Singh	Hindi	
2014	Chitram Cheppina Katha		Telugu	Unreleased
2015	Ram Leela	Special Appearance	Telugu	
2015	Dove	Sona	Kannada	
2016	Dil Sala Sanki		Hindi	
2016	Super 2		Telugu	
2018	Mausam Ikrar Ke Do Pal Pyar Ke	Anjali	Hindi	
2022	Kartoot	Nighar	Hindi	
2025	The Bengal Files	Wife of Sardar Husseini, unnamed	Hindi	

=== Television ===
Year	Title	Role	Notes
2020–2024	Anupamaa	Kavya Shah	
2022	Ravivaar With Star Parivaar	Kavya Shah	Episodes 1, 2, 5, 7, 8, 9

=== Web series ===
Year	Title	Role	Notes
2022	Anupama: Namaste America	Kavya Gandhi	Cameo; Episode 11

=== Music videos ===
Year	Title	Singer(s)	Ref.
2017	Dhoka	Rimesh Raja	
2021	Butterfly	Dev Negi, Swati Sharma	
2023	Dil Ki Tu Zameen	Sudhanshu Pandey	

== Awards and nominations ==
Year	Award	Category	Work	Result	Ref.
2020	Indian Television Academy Awards	Best Actress in a Supporting Role	Anupamaa	Nominated	
