= Mem Vayasuku Vacham =

- Theatrical release poster
- Directed by: Trinadha Rao Nakkina
- Produced by: Bekkam Venugopal
- Starring: Tanish; Niti Taylor; Madalasa Sharma; Mahaboob Basha
- Cinematography: Sai Sriram
- Music by: Shekar Chandra
- Production company: Lucky Media
- Release date: 23 June 2012
- Country: India
- Language: Telugu

Mem Vayasuku Vacham (transl. We Have Come of Age) is a 2012 Indian Telugu-language film directed by Trinadha Rao Nakkina. The film stars Tanish and Niti Taylor. The film was titled after a song from 7G Brindavan Colony (2004).

Mem Vayasuku Vacham was a success at the box office.

== Plot ==
When Lucky meets Dil, he has no way of knowing that he would fall in love with her. When he knows that she is engaged to another man he realizes his love for her. He expresses his feelings, but she keeps him away. Then she realizes that she is also in love, however fate is determined to keep the two apart, as Dil is set to marry another man.

The story revolves around a young man Lucky who loves a girl named Khushi. Later she gets to know about Dil, a girl who lucky used to love.

3 years before

Lucky a college student meets Dil along with her brother as a small Quarrell starts between Lucky and her brother. He later realizes that Dil is in the same class as he is. After a series of funny moments, they become close friends and lucky harnesses feelings for her only to know that she is engaged and was leaving the college. he requests her to attend the sendoff party and then leave the college and she hesitantly agrees. During those three days they grow close to each other.

In a subsequent scene its known that Dil's parents have set the dates for marriage. Worried by this both decide to elope and are helped by Lucky's friends. They arrange a register marriage, but due to a change of heart Dil opts to not deceive her parents. So Lucky takes her back to their parents' house where a small fight breaks between Ismail and Lucky.

Dil decides that she would listen to her parents and marry kudus, her fiancé.' Heartbroken by this, Lucky drinks and misses the marriage. He is mentally broken and wants to meet her for a final time, but his friend controls him.

Present

After being satisfied with the answer Kushi grows closer to him thanks to an explanation from Subramanyam. Later its shown that Dil and Lucky are on good terms and are now close friends. Lucky and Kushi meet Dil and kudus who now have a son. The movie ends with Kushi accepting Lucky's love.

== Cast ==
- Tanish as Lakshman "Lucky"
- Niti Taylor as Dilruba Begum "Dil"
- Madalasa Sharma as Kushi
- K. Bhagyaraj as Subramanyam from Chennai
- Mahaboob Basha as Ismail
- Rama Prabha as Dil's grandmother
- Y. Kasi Viswanath as Lucky's father
- Snigdha as SMS Shyamala
- Surya as Dil's father
- Sana as Dil's mother
- Raksha as Lucky's mother
- Dhanraj as Beggar
- Thagubothu Ramesh as Beggar
- Chammak Chandra as Beggar

== Soundtrack ==
The music was composed by Shekar Chandra.

Mem Vayasuku Vacham

Soundtrack album by Shekar Chandra
- Released: 2011-12
- Genre: Feature film soundtrack
- Language: Telugu
- Label: Madhura Audio

Shekar Chandra chronology
Ooh La La La (2012)	Mem Vayasuku Vacham (2011)	Avunu (2012)

No.	Title	Singer(s)	Length
1.	"Love You Cheputhondi"	Revanth
2.	"Nuvvala Oka Navvutho"	Sekhar Chandra
3.	"Vellipove"	Ranjith
4.	"Manasuko Emayindo"	Anjana Sowmya	04:38
5.	"Giftulu Isthadu"	Geeta Madhuri, Tejaswini
6.	"Oopirilo Oopiriga"	Harshika, Deepu

== Reception ==
A critic from The Times of India rated it at three stars, citing that the movie's romance and music stood out as highlights. Jeevi of Idlebrain.com rated the film 3/5 and wrote, "Mem Vayasuku Vacham is a film that is different from the routine love stories we get in Telugu films. It is realistic, partly entertaining and honest".
