= Chitram Cheppina Katha =

Unreleased Indian film

- Directed by: Mohan Alrk
- Written by: Amaraneni Naresh
- Produced by: Chandgari Munna
- Starring: Uday Kiran; Madalasa Sharma; Garima Jain
- Cinematography: Satheesh Muthyala
- Edited by: Vinay Ram
- Music by: Munna Kasi
- Running time: 151 minutes
- Country: India
- Language: Telugu

Chitram Cheppina Katha (transl. A story told by a picture) is an unreleased Telugu-language mystery film about a man who searches the secrets of his past, starring Uday Kiran and Madalasa Sharma, his last film before his suicide. The audio launch of this film was attended by his family. The film was scheduled to be released in 2017, but has not released as of now.

== Cast ==
- Uday Kiran as Karthik
- Madalasa Sharma
- Garima Jain

== Soundtrack ==
All tracks are written by Unknown.

No.	Title	Singer(s)	Length
1.	"Yenno Alalu"	Dinakar	Unknown
2.	"Neelone Ee Kalaham"	Vedala Hemachandra	Unknown
3.	"Vachche Vaasanthale"	Sri Krishna, Shivani	Unknown
4.	"Strawberry Flavour Ni"	Shivani	Unknown
5.	"Udayinche Kiranamla"	Munna Kasi	Unknown
6.	"Chitram Cheppina Katha Theme"		Unknown
Total length:			Unknown
