= Ullasamga Utsahamga =

Ullasanga Utsahanga
- Release poster
- Directed by: A. Karunakaran
- Written by: Chintapalli Ramana (Dialogues)
- Screenplay by: A. Karunakaran
- Story by: A. Karunakaran
- Produced by: G. S. Ranganath; B. P. Somu
- Starring: Yasho Sagar; Sneha Ullal
- Cinematography: I. Andrew
- Edited by: Marthand K. Venkatesh
- Music by: G. V. Prakash Kumar
- Production company: Amruth Amarnath Arts
- Release date: 18 July 2008
- Running time: 156 minutes
- Country: India
- Language: Telugu
- Budget: ₹4 crore
- Box office: ₹8-9 crore distributors' share

Ullasamga Utsahamga (transl. Joyfully and energetically) is a 2008 Indian Telugu-language romantic comedy film written and directed by A. Karunakaran. The film stars Yasho Sagar and Sneha Ullal in their Telugu film debut. With music composed by G. V. Prakash Kumar, the film was released on 18 July 2008. The movie was declared a blockbuster at the box office. The film was dubbed in Malayalam as Ayyo Pavam. It was remade into Kannada as Ullasa Utsaha (2010) and also remade into Bangladeshi Bengali as Er Beshi Bhalobasha Jay Na (2013).

Yasho Sagar died in a car crash on 19 December 2012. He had starred in another unreleased film titled Mr Premikudu.

== Plot ==
Dhanalakshmi, alias Dhana, is the only daughter of a landlord who has over ₹50 crore of property. As she lost her mother in her childhood, her father married another woman. However, Dhana faces neglect from her stepmother. After Dhana's father passes away, there is no one to console her, and the only friend who showed affection was Balaji. He, too, leaves her after she completes her schooling. After Dhana grew up, she bequeathed her father's property, and her mother saw it and wanted to marry Dhana against her wishes. Then, Dhana escapes from her house and takes shelter in her friend's house in Hyderabad.

Aravind, the son of a garage owner, is a vagabond. He comes across Dhana and loses his heart to her. However, after a few encounters, Dhana gets caught by her stepmother, and when she is about to take her away, Aravind helps her escape the abduction with the help of the police. This makes Dhana befriend Aravind, and she reveals her childhood friendship and tells him that she is in love with Balaji and cannot imagine any other in his place. After refusing, Aravind decides to seek employment in Kolkata. At the same time, Dhana also learns that Balaji is in Kolkata.

They both again meet on a train, and accidentally, Dhana misses the train during the journey. Aravind helps her reach Kolkata to meet Balaji. In the process, Aravind gets severely hurt at the hands of a criminal who tries to implicate Dhana in a narcotics case. Later, Aravind takes Dhana to Balaji's house in Kolkata. Dhana's stepmother also reaches Kolkata and agrees to Dhana's marriage to Balaji. When the marriage is about to take place, Dhana realises that her stepmother enacted a drama and created a fake Balaji to impress Dhana. Again, Aravind comes to her rescue, and at that time, Dhana realizes that she is in love with Aravind. The film ends with Dhana and Aravind accidentally meeting Balaji and his fiancée. Shocked, Dhana faints upon knowing this, then Arvind manages the situation and tactically leaves the place with her.

== Cast ==
- Yasho Sagar as Aravind (voice dubbed by Sivaji).
- Sneha Ullal as Dhanalakshmi (voice dubbed by Sunitha).
  - Baby Kavya as Young Dhanalakshmi
- Brahmanandam as Colony Secretary
- Sunil as Malli Babu
- Chandra Mohan as Arvind's father
- Sudha as Aravind's mother
- Prasad Babu as Dhanalakshmi's father
- Kavitha as Dhanalakshmi's stepmother
- Surekha Vani as Aravind's elder sister
- Satya Krishnan as Aravind's sister-in-law
- Sattanna as Surekha Vani's husband (S/W Engineer)
- Suman Setty as Ganesh, Aravind's friend
- Ping Pong Surya as Aravind's friend
- Sri Latha as Dhanalakshmi's friend
- Kallu Krishna Rao as Dhanalakshmi's family member
- L. B. Sriram as Subbayya, Dhanalakshmi's servant
- Karthikeya as Fake Balaji
- Ashok Kumar as Police Officer
- Venu Madhav as Fraud Billionaire
- Dharmavarapu Subramanyam as Car Lift
- Allari Subhashini as Ganesh's mother
- Gautam Raju as Babu Rao Properties
- Ananth Babu

== Production ==
Bharath, the son of Kannada film producer B. P. Somu and a relative of Prajwal Devraj, made his debut under the stage name of Yasho Sagar.

== Soundtrack ==
Ullasamga Utsahamga

Soundtrack album by G. V. Prakash Kumar
- Released: 7 May 2008
- Genre: Feature film soundtrack
- Length: 33:20
- Label: Aditya Music

G. V. Prakash Kumar chronology
Kaalai (2007)	Ullasamga Utsahamga (2008)	Kuselan / Kathanayakudu (2008)

The soundtrack consisted of seven songs composed by G. V. Prakash. Lyrics were written by Anantha Sriram. The audio of the film was released on 7 May 2008.

No.	Title	Singers	Length
1.	"Ullasamga"	Krish	04:30
2.	"Dhannale Thalli"	Rahul Nambiar	04:55
3.	"Naa Prema"	Karthik, Harini	04:25
4.	"Lalipata"	V. V. Prasanna	03:10
5.	"Priyatama"	Sonu Nigam, Rahul Nambiar	06:01
6.	"Mata Matiki"	Sayanora Philip, Rahul Nambiar, Karthik	05:32
7.	"Chakori"	Vasundhara Das, Benny Dayal	04:45
Total length:			33:20

== Reception ==
Jeevi of Idlebrain.com wrote that "On a whole, Ullasanga Utsahanga is a decent love story with some cute and cherishing moments". A critic from Rediff.com wrote that "On the whole, Ullasanga Utsahanga is watchable for its feel-good appeal".

== Award(s) ==
- A. Karunakaran won the Nandi Award for Best Screenplay Writer.
