= Tata Birla Madhyalo Laila =

- DVD cover
- Directed by: Srinivasa Reddy
- Screenplay by: Srinivasa Reddy
- Produced by: Bekkam Venugopal
- Starring: Sivaji; Krishna Bhagavaan; Tanikella Bharani; Laya
- Cinematography: Santosh Srinivas
- Edited by: V. Nagireddy
- Music by: M. M. Srilekha
- Production company: Lucky Media
- Release date: 13 October 2006
- Running time: 140 minutes
- Country: India
- Language: Telugu

Tata Birla Madhyalo Laila (transl. Tata and Birla with Laila in the middle) is a 2006 Indian Telugu-language film produced by Bekkam Venugopal, in his film debut and directed by Srinivasa Reddy. The film stars Sivaji, Krishna Bhagavan, and Laya in lead roles. The film is a remake of the 1996 Tamil movie Tata Birla and was a commercial success at the box office.

== Plot ==
Tata (Sivaji) and Birla (Krishna Bhagavan) are 2 petty thieves who dream of planning a big robbery one day. Their dreams come true when they overhear a deal involving hundreds of crores. They lock up the original man who's hired for the deal and head to the home of Mahalakshmi (Laya), a wealthy heiress. They gradually realize the happiness of life and decide to quit being thieves. But it is then revealed that the deal was to kill Mahalakshmi and that the man responsible for the deal was Mahalakshmi's uncle Gajapathi (Tanikella Bharani). Soon Mahalakshmi even falls in love with Tata and he too falls for her eventually. Meanwhile, another mysterious man disguised as a lady (Ali) enters their household to kill Mahalakshmi as well. The rest of the story depicts on how Tata and Birla save Mahalakshmi from Gajapathi's plans and who the strange man really is.

== Cast ==
- Sivaji as Tata
- Krishna Bhagavaan as Birla
- Ali as Masthan alias Laila
- Laya as Mahalakshmi
- Tanikella Bharani as Gajapathi
- Raghu Babu as Dora Babu aka Thief Adhova Swamiji
- Duvvasi Mohan as Potti Lingam
- Gangadhar Panday as Businessman
- Brahmanandam as Police officer
- Padmanabham as Padmanabham
- Jeeva as Ratnam
- Hema as Orphanage caretaker
- Allari Subhashini as House Owner
- Rajitha as Mahalakshmi's aunt
- Chitram Srinu as Fox
- Master Bharath as Seetayya
- Gundu Hanumantha Rao as Seetayya's father
- Ashok Kumar as Robbery victim
- Kadambari Kiran as a Christian
- Apoorva as Police officer's wife

== Soundtrack ==
Soundtrack was composed by M. M. Srilekha.

- "Nee Body Bamper" - Jassie Gift
- "Poovai Pova Cheliya" - Vijay Yesudas
- "Sithakoka Chilakalla" - Ganga
- "Dabbu..Dabbu.." - Muralidharan
- "Tirumalavaas" - Srileka
- "Akundi Vakkesi" - Tippu, Kalpana Raghavendar

== Reception ==
A critic from Idlebrain.com wrote that "Overall, this movie can be summed as a musical comedy entertainer and lives to its tagline 'Saradaga navvukundam randi' (transl. Come let's have fun!)". A critic from Telugu Cinema wrote "Tata Birla Madhyalo Laila is primarily a comedy film and thankfully the focus is more on comedy than the heroism. Despite its formulaic story and below average technical values, the film entertains because of its fine comic scenes".

== See also ==
- Tata-Birla word pair
