= M. M. Srilekha =

Indian singer and composer

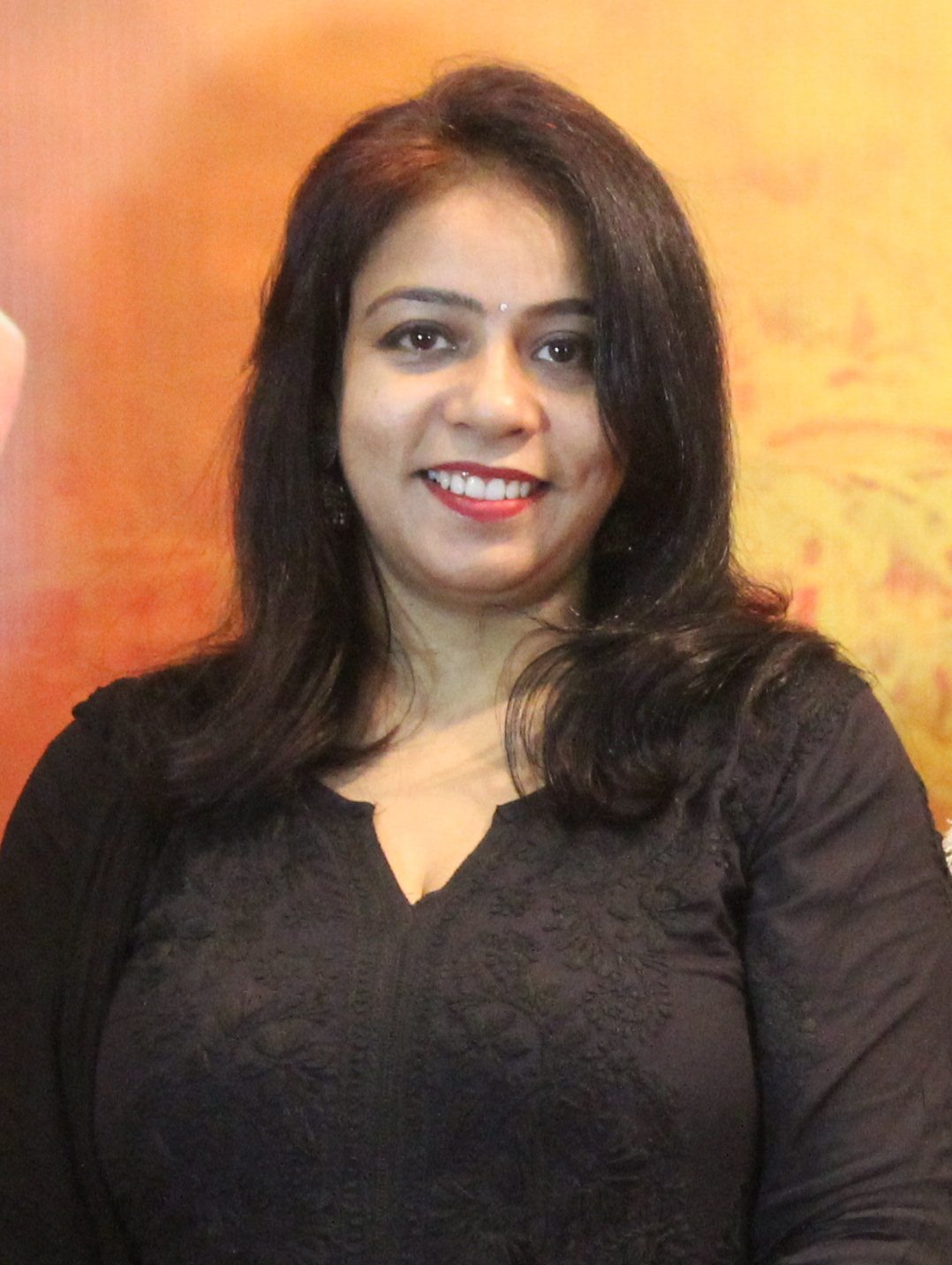

Background information
- Born: Koduri Srilekha; 8 September
- Genre: Film score
- Occupations: Film composer, playback singer
- Years active: 1996–present
- Website: www.mmsreelekha.in

Manimekhala Srilekha (born Koduri Srilekha), known professionally as M. M. Srilekha, is an Indian film playback singer and music composer, known for her works predominantly in Telugu cinema. She is the only female music composer in the Telugu film industry. Her paternal uncle V. Vijayendra Prasad's directorial venture Srivalli (2017) was her 75th film.

== Career ==
She started her career as a playback singer at the age of nine and was assisting her brother in music direction. She turned into a music composer at the age of 12 with the film Nalaiya Theerpu (1992) which was also the debut film for noted Tamil movie star Vijay. She later composed for the movies Taj Mahal (1995) and Dasari Narayana Rao's Nannagaru.

She composed music for many movies in Telugu, Tamil, Kannada, and Malayalam languages. Apart from South Indian films, She has composed for Hindi films like Hum Aapke Dil Mein Rehte Hain (1999), Mere Sapnon Ki Raani, Aaghaaz (2000) etc.

== Discography ==
=== As playback singer ===
Year	Movie
1995	Aayanaki Iddaru
1996	Sampradhayam
1996	Little Soldiers
1996	Akkada Abbai Ikkada Ammayi
1996	Devaraagam (Malayalam)
1996	Dharma Chakram
1997	Pelli Sandadi
1997	Annamayya
2001	Ammaye Navvithe
2003	Fools
2006	Sri Krishna 2006
2007	Chandamama
2008	Bommana Brothers Chandana Sisters
2008	Koasalya Supraja Rama
2011	Kiran Datti

=== Filmography as composer ===
==== Telugu films ====
Year	Film
1995	Nannagaru
1995	Kondapalli Ratayya
1995	Taj Mahal
1996	Oho Naa Pellanta
1996	Dharma Chakram
1997	Navvulata
1998	Sivayya
1998	Ulta Palta
1999	Velugu Needalu
1999	Preyasi Raave
2000	Moodu Mukkalaata
2000	Aaghaaz
2001	Preminchu
2001	Ammaye Navvithe
2002	Parasuram
2002	Ninne Cherukunta
2003	Ishtapadi
2003	Neetho Vastha
2004	Ammayi Bagundi
2005	Adirindayya Chandram
2005	Nireekshana
2005	786 Khaidi Premakatha
2006	Tata Birla Madhyalo Laila
2006	Sri Krishna 2006
2007	Operation Duryodhana
2007	State Rowdy
2007	Prema Charitra
2007	Maharajasree
2007	Laila Majnu
2007	Mahalakshmi
2007	Maisamma IPS
2008	Andhamaina Abaddham
2008	Adivishnu
2008	Maa Ayana Chanti Pilladu
2008	Mangatayaru Tiffin Center
2008	Donga Sachinollu
2008	Thinnama Padukunnama Tellarinda
2008	Veeto Vasta
2008	Bommana Brothers Chandana Sisters
2009	Ram Dev
2009	A Aa E Ee
2009	Bangaru Babu
2010	Brahmalokam To Yamalokam Via Bhulokam
2010	Dasanna
2011	Chattam
2011	Dushasana
2012	Em Babu Laddu Kavala
2013	Pavitra
2013	Park
2013	Nenem...Chinna Pillana?
2013	Operation Duryodhana 2
2017	Srivalli
2022	HIT: The Second Case

==== Other language films ====
Year	Film	Language
1992	Naalaya Theerpu	Tamil
2001	Maduve Aagona Baa	Kannada
2013	Benki Birugali	Kannada
2013	Kadhal Solla Aasai	Tamil

=== Television ===
- Santhi Nivasam (composer and singer)
