= Chiranjeevulu (2001 film) =

2001 film by Radha Krishna

- Directed by: Radha Krishna
- Written by: Radha Krishna
- Produced by: Bingi Durgadas Goud
- Starring: Ravi Teja; Sanghavi; Sivaji; Brahmaji; Shiju
- Music by: A. B. Murali
- Release date: 1 January 2001
- Running time: 151 minutes
- Country: India
- Language: Telugu

Chiranjeevulu (transl. Immortals) is a 2001 Telugu action drama film written and directed by Radha Krishna in his debut. The film stars Ravi Teja, Sanghavi, Sivaji, Brahmaji, and Shiju. The music was composed by A. B. Murali, and the film released on 1 January 2001. The title is based on the 1956 Telugu film of the same name starring N. T. Rama Rao and Jamuna. The film is a remake of the Tamil film Putham Pudhu Payanam (1991).

== Plot ==
Charan, Kiran, Giri, and Chanti are close friends. While Charan and Kiran are orphans, Giri and Chanti are terminally ill patients undergoing treatment at a hospital. One day, at the house of nurse Sudha, the friends witness a local MLA and his brother harassing her. During the ensuing confrontation, the MLA is accidentally killed. Fearing that the police may not believe their account, the four flee the city and take refuge in a remote village as fugitives.

In the village, they become entangled in the longstanding rivalry between the village president Satyamurthy and the late former president Nagendra. After unsuccessfully attempting to save Nagendra’s son Rajan from an attack orchestrated by Satyamurthy’s henchmen, the friends attract the attention of the villagers. Satyamurthy demands in a Panchayat meeting that the outsiders be expelled from the village. However, Nagendra’s widow Devi, having witnessed their attempt to save Rajan, intervenes and publicly accepts the four friends as her sons.

Devi later reveals the history of the feud between Nagendra and Satyamurthy. Nagendra had been an honest and respected village president, earning the admiration of the villagers, which fueled Satyamurthy’s jealousy. In an attempt to tarnish Nagendra’s reputation, Satyamurthy secretly orchestrated the theft of jewelry from the village temple through one of his servants. Nagendra exposed the servant before the Panchayat, but could not prove Satyamurthy’s involvement.

Meanwhile, Nagendra’s daughter Radha confesses that she is in love with Anand, Satyamurthy’s son. Setting aside their rivalry, Nagendra proposes their marriage to Satyamurthy. However, Satyamurthy agrees only on the condition that Nagendra withdraw from the village president election, ensuring his own uncontested victory. Outraged by the demand, Nagendra refuses to yield. Satyamurthy subsequently arranges Nagendra’s murder using a snake attack disguised as an accident. After hearing Devi’s story, the four friends vow to bring justice to the family. During this time, Charan also falls in love with a village girl named Kaveri.

One day, Satyamurthy catches Anand and Radha together and, in a fit of rage, orders his men to assault Radha while restraining Anand. Charan and his friends intervene and rescue them. Kaveri later discovers the truth about the friends’ past, but chooses to keep it secret.

Soon afterward, Charan and his friends overhear Satyamurthy negotiating with international smugglers to illegally sell the temple jewelry. Realizing they have discovered his plans, Satyamurthy sends his men after them and traps them in quicksand, leaving them for dead. He then plots to steal the temple jewelry and frame the four friends for the crime. However, they are rescued in time by Kaveri and a police inspector who arrives in the village after learning of their whereabouts. Charan persuades the inspector to give them time to stop the theft, promising that they will surrender afterward. The inspector agrees.

The friends ultimately foil the robbery and capture Satyamurthy and the smugglers red-handed. Before the Panchayat, they expose all of Satyamurthy’s crimes and successfully unite Radha and Anand in marriage. Humiliated and enraged, Satyamurthy launches a violent attack on the village with his men. During the confrontation, Giri and Chanti sacrifice their lives while protecting Radha and Anand. Charan finally avenges Nagendra’s death by killing Satyamurthy using the same method of snake attack that had been used against Nagendra.

In the end, Charan and Kiran surrender to the inspector and leave for the city. A concluding voiceover states that through their sacrifices and actions, Charan and his friends became “Chiranjeevulu” — immortals in the hearts of the people.

== Cast ==
- Ravi Teja as Charan
- Sivaji as Chanti
- Brahmaji as Giri
- Shiju as Kiran
- Sanghavi as Kaveri
- Prathyusha
- Nagendra Babu as Nagendra
- Lakshmi
- Jaya Prakash Reddy as Satyamurthy
- Brahmanandam
- Tanikella Bharani
- Ahuti Prasad
- Rallapalli
- Duvvasi Mohan
- Ramjagan

== Production ==
The film was to be produced earlier by Divya Jyoti Banners, but owing to financial issues, they abandoned the project. Veteran producer, Raghava, then revived the project as he liked the subject of the film.

== Music ==
The songs for this film were composed by A. B. Murali with lyrics penned by Siva Ganesh.

Chiranjeevulu

Soundtrack album by A. B. Murali
- Released: 2001
- Language: Telugu
- Producer: A. B. Murali

Track listing
No.	Title	Singer(s)	Length
1.	"Anuragam Anubandham"	K. S. Chithra, Srinivas
2.	"Kanne Vedi Pilla"	Naveen, Harini
3.	"Palliey Pachani"	Srinivas, Gopika Poornima
4.	"Ramba Urvashi Menaka"	Naveen, Raajamani

== Reception ==
Kalyan Achanta of fullhyd.com gave it a rating of 3.0 calling it "nearly a remake" of Sholay.
