= Maa Ayana Chanti Pilladu =

- Theatrical release poster
- Directed by: Raja Vannem Reddy
- Written by: Rajendrakumar (dialogues)
- Story by: S. P. Rajkumar
- Produced by: Bekkam Venugopal
- Starring: Sivaji; Meera Jasmine; Sangeetha
- Music by: M. M. Srilekha
- Production company: Lucky Media
- Release date: 25 July 2008
- Country: India
- Language: Telugu

Maa Ayana Chanti Pilladu (transl. My Husband is a Small Boy) is a 2008 Indian Telugu-language romantic drama film directed by Raja Vannem Reddy. Sivaji, Meera Jasmine, and Sangeetha played the lead roles. The film was a remake of the Tamil movie En Purushan Kuzhandhai Maathiri (2001).

== Plot ==
Bullabbayi (Sivaji) is fond of his sister-in-law, Rajeswari (Meera Jasmine). He loves her so much and wants to be flawless with good character. Though Rajeswari behaves like she is not interested in him, she indeed loves him. Bullabbayi has a property dispute with his half-brother, Veerababu (Subbaraju). In a bid to save a girl called Chintamani (Sangeeta) from being sold by a brothel owner (Anuradha) to Veerababu, Bullabbayi pays her money, takes Chintamani with him, and keeps her in his outhouse. He tells her to leave the place the next day, but accidentally, seduces Chintamani, after an attack by Veerababu's men against him. Being an honest boy, Bullabbayi reveals everything to his father-in-law and urges him to stop the marriage, but the latter refuses to do so. Again, Bullabbayi innocently reveals the incident to Rajeswari as he doesn't want to cheat her who thinks he is pious and flawless. Rajeswari attempts suicide and gets saved by Bullabbayi. However, Rajeswari refuses to share the marital life with Bullabbayi. A few days later, her father convinces her and appeals to honour his honesty. Being impressed with his innocence, Rajeswari allows him into the bedroom and they enjoy a good family life. As a result, Rajeswari turns pregnant, as well as Chintamani. How does Bullabbayi manage both his pregnant wives? Does Chintamani come into the life of Rajeswari? Does Rajeswari keep mum on learning Chintamani was also pregnant and Bullabbayi continued to pamper her? What happens to the property dispute between Bullabbayi and Veerababu? How did Veerababu react against Bullabbayi? The answers to all these questions form part of the climax.

== Cast ==
- Sivaji as Bullabbayi
- Meera Jasmine as Rajeswari
- Sangeetha as Chintamani
- Subbaraju as Suribabu
- Venu Madhav
- Chandra Mohan
- Annapurna
- Satyam Rajesh
- Chitram Srinu
- Ashok Kumar as doctor
- Tirupathi Prakash as priest

== Production ==
Director Raja Vannem Reddy wanted to remake the Tamil film En Purushan Kuzhandhai Maathiri (2001) in Telugu but couldn't due so due to the high price of the film's remake rights. A few months later, Sivaji sent Raja Vannem Reddy the CD of the same Tamil film expressing interest to remake it.

== Soundtrack ==
The film's music was composed by M. M. Srilekha. The audio launch took place on 21 April 2008 at Prasad Labs in Hyderabad with Bhumika Chawla attending as the chief guest.

- "Modatasari Muddupeditye" - Srikrishna, Ganga
- "Yemandoye Srivaru" - Vijay Yesudas, M. M. Srilekha
- "Yemi Sethura Linga" - Santha Kumari
- "Adugu Adugu" - Geetha Madhuri, Jeans Srinivas
- "Bavalu Sayya Sy" - Radhika, M. M. Srilekha
