= Lankapalli =

- Village
- Interactive map of Lankapalli
- Coordinates: 18°36′N 80°39′E
- Country: India
- State: Andhra Pradesh
- District: Krishna

Area
  - Total: 4.33 km^{2} (1.67 sq mi)

Population (2011)
  - Total: 2,448
  - Density: 565/km^{2} (1,460/sq mi)

Languages
  - Official: Telugu
- Time zone: UTC+5:30 (IST)
- PIN: 521131
- Telephone code: 08671
- Vehicle registration: AP 16
- Nearest city: Challapalli(Town)
- Lok Sabha constituency: Machilipatnam
- Vidhan Sabha constituency: Avanigadda

Lankapalli is a village in the state of Andhra Pradesh in India, is in the Krishna district, Ghantasala Mandal, near Challapalli.
