= Operation Duryodhana 2 =

- Theatrical release poster
- Directed by: Nandam Harishchandra Rao
- Screenplay by: Nandam Harishchandra Rao
- Story by: Chinna Unit
- Produced by: AB Srinivas
- Starring: Jagapati Babu
- Cinematography: D. Prasad Babu
- Edited by: Gautham Raju
- Music by: M. M. Srilekha
- Production companies: Neelanjana & Chinna Productions
- Release date: 5 July 2013
- Running time: 105 minutes
- Country: India
- Language: Telugu

Operation Duryodhana 2 is a 2013 Indian Telugu-language political film directed by Nandam Harishchandra Rao. Starring Jagapati Babu plays the lead role and music composed by M. M. Srilekha. This film is a sequel to the 2007 Telugu film Operation Duryodhana. In 2017, the film was dubbed into Hindi under the title Operation Duryodhana by Wide Angle Media Pvt Ltd.

== Cast ==
- Jagapati Babu as Ashok (C.B.I. Officer)
- Posani Krishna Murali as Krishnakanth alias Pappu (a hawala broker)
- Kota Srinivasa Rao as Home Minister Venkatadri
- Erasu Pratap Reddy as CM Pratap Reddy
- Rao Ramesh as Ramesh
- Babu Mohan
- Vijayachander
- Asha Saini
- Srilalitha
- Neeraj Yadav
