= A. Karunakaran =

Indian film director

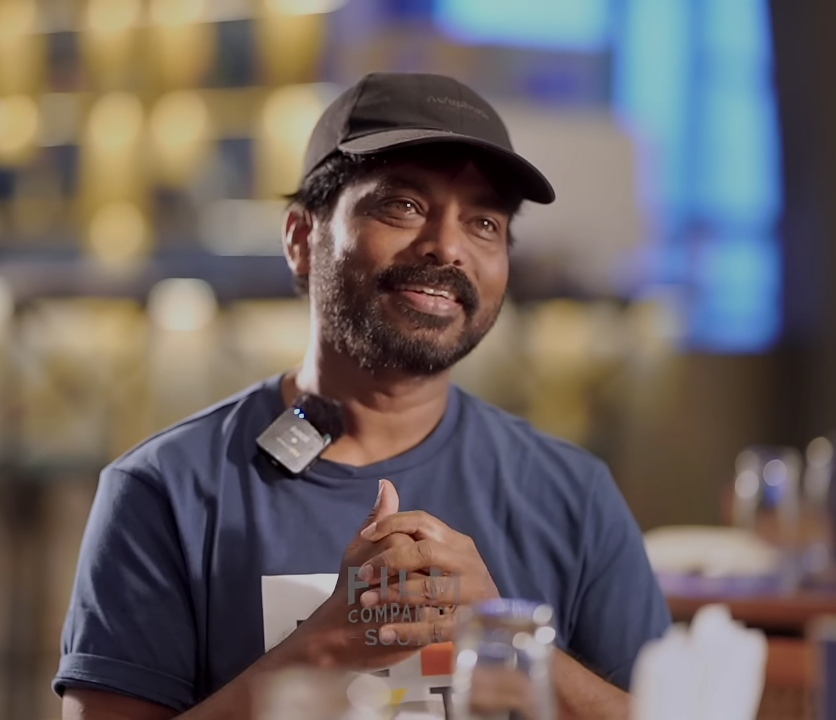
- Born: December 25, 1971 (age 54); Devakottai, Tamil Nadu, India
- Occupations: Director, writer, screenwriter.
- Years active: 1996–2018
- Children: 2

A. Karunakaran (born 25 December 1971) is a Telugu film director known for Tholi Prema (1998), Happy (2006), Ullasamga Utsahamga (2008) and Darling (2010).

== Career ==
Karunakaran began his career as a clap director for Kadhal Desam (1996) after Sasi introduced him to Kathir. He worked as an assistant to Bhagyaraj and Shankar before making his directorial debut with Tholi Prema (1998). He conceived the script while in Madras and cast Pawan Kalyan after seeing him in a magazine. Tholi Prema was a box office success. His second film Yuvakudu was Bhumika Chawla's first film. The film was unsuccessful. His next film Vasu (2002) was not very successful at the box office, but garnered a cult following over the years. Karunakaran collaborated with Pawan Kalyan for Balu ABCDEFG (2005), but the film was a failure unlike Tholi Prema. The following year, Happy (2006), based on the Tamil film Azhagiya Theeye (2004) released and was a box office success. Karunakaran garnered acclaim for Ullasamga Utsahamga (2008) starring newcomer Yasho Sagar. Darling (2010) released to positive reviews. He then directed a bilingual titled Endhukante Premanta in Telugu and Yen Endral Kadhal Enben in Tamil. The Telugu version released to negative reviews while the Tamil version was never released. Chinnadana Nee Kosam (2014) and Tej I Love You (2018) released to mixed reviews.

== Filmography ==
Year	Film	Notes
1998	Tholi Prema	Cameo appearance National Film Award for Best Feature Film in Telugu
2000	Yuvakudu	
2002	Vasu	Cameo appearance
2005	Balu ABCDEFG	
2006	Happy	
2008	Ullasamga Utsahamga	Nandi Award for Best Screenplay Writer
2010	Darling	
2012	Endhukante Premanta	Simultaneously shot in Tamil as Yen Endral Kadhal Enben
2014	Chinnadana Nee Kosam	
2018	Tej I Love You	
