= A Aa E Ee (2009 Telugu film) =

- Directed by: Srinivasa Reddy
- Produced by: Boddam Ashok Yadav
- Starring: Srikanth; Meera Jasmine; Sadha
- Cinematography: Vijay C. Kumar
- Edited by: Gautham Raju
- Music by: M. M. Srilekha
- Production company: Sri Kalpana Arts
- Distributed by: Sri Kalpana Arts
- Release date: 6 November 2009
- Country: India
- Language: Telugu

A Aa E Ee (short for Athalo Aame Inthalo Eeme) is a 2009 Indian Telugu language film directed by Srinivasa Reddy. The film stars Srikanth, Meera Jasmine and Sadha in lead roles. Krishna Bhagawan, Ali, Kovai Sarala, Kavitha, Hema play prominent supporting roles in the film.

== Plot ==
Chandram is an honest man and a devoted husband to Kalyani. His life takes a turn when he discovers that Pregnant Kalyani is suffering from a rare disease and he has to get Rs. 8 lakh for treatment. While gathering the amount, he is compelled to act as husband to Ramya, who is thought dead. However, Ramya comes back alive and now Chandram is caught between both women. What happens from there forms the rest of the story.

== Cast ==
- Srikanth as Chandram, a cab driver
- Meera Jasmine as Kalyani
- Sadha as Ramya
- Telangana Shakuntala as Chandram's grandmother
- Tanikella Bharani as Ramya's father
- Kavitha as Ramya's mother
- Krishna Bhagawan as lawyer
- Hema
- M S Narayana as Pittapuram
- Ali as Rajini
- Brahmanandam
- Kovai Sarala
- Giri Babu as cab company owner
- Raghu Babu as Ramya's brother-in-law
- Sunil as James Bond 000
- Uttej as James Bond's assistant
- Vizag Prasad as Police officer
- Prudhvi Raj as Police officer
- Gundu Sudarshan as Gundu Rao
- Kallu Chidambaram
- Duvvasi Mohan
- Venkat (special appearance)

== Production ==
In mid-2007, Srinivasa Reddy was attached to direct a film starring Srikanth produced by NRI Kishore Putta.

== Soundtrack ==
The music was composed by M. M. Srilekha. The audio launch took place in March 2009 in Club Jayabheri in Hyderabad with V. V. Vinayak and Allari Naresh as chief guests.

| No. | Title | Singer(s) | Length |
|---|---|---|---|
| 1. | "Kasiki Poyanui" | Sunidhi Chauhan |
| 2. | "Mila Mila" | Mano, S. Janaki |
| 3. | "Puppodikanna" | Udit Narayan, Pranavi |
| 4. | "Entha Narakam" | Karthik, M. M. Srilekha |
| 5. | "Achchata Muchatha" | Karthik, M. M. Srilekha |

== Reception ==
Jeevi of Idlebrain.com rated the film 2/5 and wrote, "Director Srinivasa Reddy who made a name for himself in comedy department by churning out comedy films on low budget seem to have got carried away with this movie".
