= Aalasyam Amrutam =

- Film poster
- Directed by: Chandra Mahesh
- Produced by: D. Ramanaidu
- Starring: Nikhil Siddharth; Madalasa Sharma
- Music by: Koti
- Production company: Suresh Productions
- Release date: 3 December 2010
- Country: India
- Language: Telugu

Aalasyam Amrutam (meaning: The Delay is Sweet/Sweet Delay) is a 2010 Indian Telugu-language comedy film directed by Chandra Mahesh and produced by D. Ramanaidu for Suresh Productions. Nikhil Siddharth and Madalasa Sharma playing the lead roles.

== Plot ==
Ram (Nikhil) is a young man who has recently got a job in the USA. After visiting the Annavaram Temple, he's waiting for his train to reach the city, from where he can take off to the US. Here he meets Vaidehi (Madalasa Sharma) who has runaway from home, because her parents want to marry her off to someone she doesn't like. Vaidehi has a dark side, which she doesn't want anyone around her to know about. Together Ram and Vaidehi chance upon a months old baby, who has been left abandoned at the station. Ram, being a kind hearted guy, doesn't want to leave the baby. Luckily for him, his train is late. In the meantime both he and Vaidehi try to find the baby's parents.

== Cast ==
- Nikhil Siddharth as Ram
- Madalasa Sharma as Vaidehi
- Arvind Krishna
- Gundu Sudarshan
- Raghu Babu as Railway Police Officer
- Ali as Thief
- AVS
- Dharmavarapu Subramanyam
- M. S. Narayana as Station master
- L. B. Sriram
- Shiva Reddy
- Tirupathi Prakash

== Soundtrack ==
All music is composed by Koti

No.	Title	Singer(s)	Length
1.	"Hey Pilla"	Ranjith, Geetha Madhuri	4:23
2.	"Olammi Tingarabucchi"	Simha, Chaitra	3:44
3.	"Edavakey"	Karthik, Malavika, Anjana Sowmya	4:21
4.	"Daga Daga Daga"	Sri Krishna, Sai Shivani	3:56
5.	"Modati Kshanam"	Sri Krishna, M. L. Shruthi	4:26
Total length:			20:50

== Release ==
Rediff said that "On the whole, Alasyam Amrutham makes for an interesting watch".
