= Sivaji (Telugu actor) =

Indian actor

- Born: Sontineni Sivaji; 30 June 1971 (age 55); Narasaraopet, Andhra Pradesh
- Occupations: Actor; voice actor
- Years active: 1997–2018; 2023–present

Sontineni Sivaji (born 30 June 1971), is an Indian actor and voice actor who works in Telugu cinema. He had won the Nandi Award for Best Male Dubbing Artist for Dil. His notable performances include Missamma (2003), Adirindayya Chandram (2005), Satyabhama (2007), Mantra (2007), Taj Mahal (2010), Court – State vs a Nobody (2025), and Dhandoraa (2025). In 2023, he participated in the reality show Bigg Boss 7, and emerged as the second runner-up.

Beside acting, Sivaji was politically active as a member of the Bharatiya Janata Party from 2014 to 2015 when he exited the party citing ideological differences. He embarked on a hunger strike to demand special status for Andhra Pradesh.

== Early life and career ==
Sivaji is from Chilakaluripet, a town part of Narasaraopet, Palnadu. Sivaji started his stint as an editor in Gemini TV He was offered a role in a TV serial and from then he started getting offers in Telugu movies. He acted in minor roles in notable films such as Kushi and Indra. He dubbed for Nithiin in the latter's early career. He did many films as a second lead. Sivaji's first success as a solo lead came with the film Missamma (2003).

Ever since the movement for keeping the state united in Andhra Pradesh, Sivaji became vocal about the political issues. Despite being a member of the Bharatiya Janata Party (BJP) he started his fast unto death on granting a special status to Andhra Pradesh, which was a promise made by the erstwhile Congress government at the time of bifurcation of the state.

== Filmography ==
Year	Title	Role(s)	Notes	Ref.
1997	Master	Sivaji		
1997	Hello I Love You	Sumanth		
1998	Padutha Theeyaga	Rushi's friend		
1998	Sri Sita Ramula Kalyanam Chootamu Raarandi	Sivaji		
1998	Kanyadanam	Seshu		
1998	Premante Idera	Sivaji		
1999	Film Nagar			
1999	Alluri Seetharama Raju			
2000	Yuvaraju	Sivaji		
2000	Bachelors	Balu		
2000	College	Suri		
2001	Priyamaina Neeku	Raghu		
2001	Kushi	Babu		
2001	Love	Samba		
2001	Wife	Shankar		
2001	Chiranjeevulu	Chanti		
2001	Snehituda	Balu		
2002	Priya Nestama	Kiran		
2002	Chandravamsam	Hari Chandra		
2002	Friends	Balu		
2002	Manasunte Chalu	Visakha		
2002	Sandade Sandadi	Kamesh		
2002	Adrustam	Pawan		
2002	Indra	Giri / Veerya Manohar Reddy		
2002	Siva Rama Raju	Raju		
2003	Ottesi Cheputunna	Dilip		
2003	Aayudham	Rushendra		
2003	Aadanthe Ado Type	Krishna		
2003	Sriramachandrulu	Chandra		
2003	Missamma	Nanda Gopal		
2004	Ammayi Bagundi	Siva		
2004	Mr & Mrs Sailaja Krishnamurthy	Krishnamurthy		
2004	Swarabhishekam	Chandu		
2004	Konchem Touchlo Vunte Cheputanu	Kalidasu		
2005	Mr. Errababu	Erra Babu		
2005	Adirindayya Chandram	Chandram		
2006	Seetharamudu	Seetharamudu		
2006	Tata Birla Madhyalo Laila	Tata		
2006	Raraju	Surya		
2007	Aadivaram Adavallaku Selavu Kavali			
2007	Nikki and Neeraj	Neeraj		
2007	Nee Navve Chalu	Murali Krishna		
2007	Satyabhama	Krishna Kumar		
2007	Tulasi	Harsha		
2007	Bhajantrilu			
2007	State Rowdy	Rambabu		
2007	Mantra	Hero		
2008	Pellikani Prasad	Siva Prasad		
2008	Jalsa	Raghu		
2008	Brahmanandam Drama Company	Vasu		
2008	Maa Ayana Chanti Pilladu	Bullabbayyi		
2008	Aalayam	Raja		
2008	Kousalya Supraja Rama	Ravi		
2008	Kuberulu	Siva Prasad		
2009	Masth	Siva		
2009	Indumathi	Chandu		
2009	Sathyameva Jayathe	Prathap		
2009	Naa Girlfriend Baga Rich	Sanjay Sastri		
2009	18, 20 Love Story	Bullanna		
2009	Diary	Vamsi		
2010	Aakasa Ramanna	Jai		
2010	Taj Mahal	Ajay / Kumar	Also producer	
2010	Brahmalokam To Yamalokam Via Bhulokam	Seenu		
2011	Lokame Kothaga	Rahul		
2011	Mugguru	Balatripura Sundari's husband	Cameo appearance	
2011	Emaindi Nalo	Murali		
2012	Ayyare	Venkatesam		
2012	Em Babu Laddu Kavala			
2013	Dasa Tirigindi			
2013	Pavitra	Siva		
2013	Gurudu			
2013	Gola Gola			
2014	Kamalatho Naa Prayanam	Suryanarayana		
2014	Boochamma Boochodu	Karthik		
2014	Chusinodiki Chusinantha			
2015	Dorakadu			
2016	Seesa			
2025	Court	Mangapathi		
2025	Dhandoraa	Sivaji		
2026	Sampradayini Suppini Suddapoosani	Sriram	Also producer	
2026	Lenin	Yatirajulu		

=== As voice actor ===
Year	Title	Actor	Notes
2000	Chitram	Uday Kiran	
2002	Jayam	Nithin	
2002	Sontham	Aryan Rajesh	
2002	Okato Number Kurraadu	Taraka Ratna	
2003	Dil	Nithin	Nandi Award for Best Male Dubbing Artist
2003	Sambaram	Nithin	
2004	Andaru Dongale Dorikite	Prabhu Deva	
2008	Ullasamga Utsahamga	Yasho Sagar	
2012	Pizza	Vijay Sethupathi	For Telugu dubbed version

=== Television ===
Year	Title	Role	Network	Notes
2018	Gangstars	C.I. Anjaneyalu	Amazon Prime Video	
2023	Bigg Boss 7	Contestant	Star Maa	
2023	90's – A Middle Class Biopic	Chandra Sekhar	ETV Win	
TBA	PRS01 †	TBA	PR Show	

== Controversy ==
In 2025, Sivaji made controversial remarks on Nidhhi Agerwal, who was mobbed, causing outrage.
