= Pedapudi =

- village
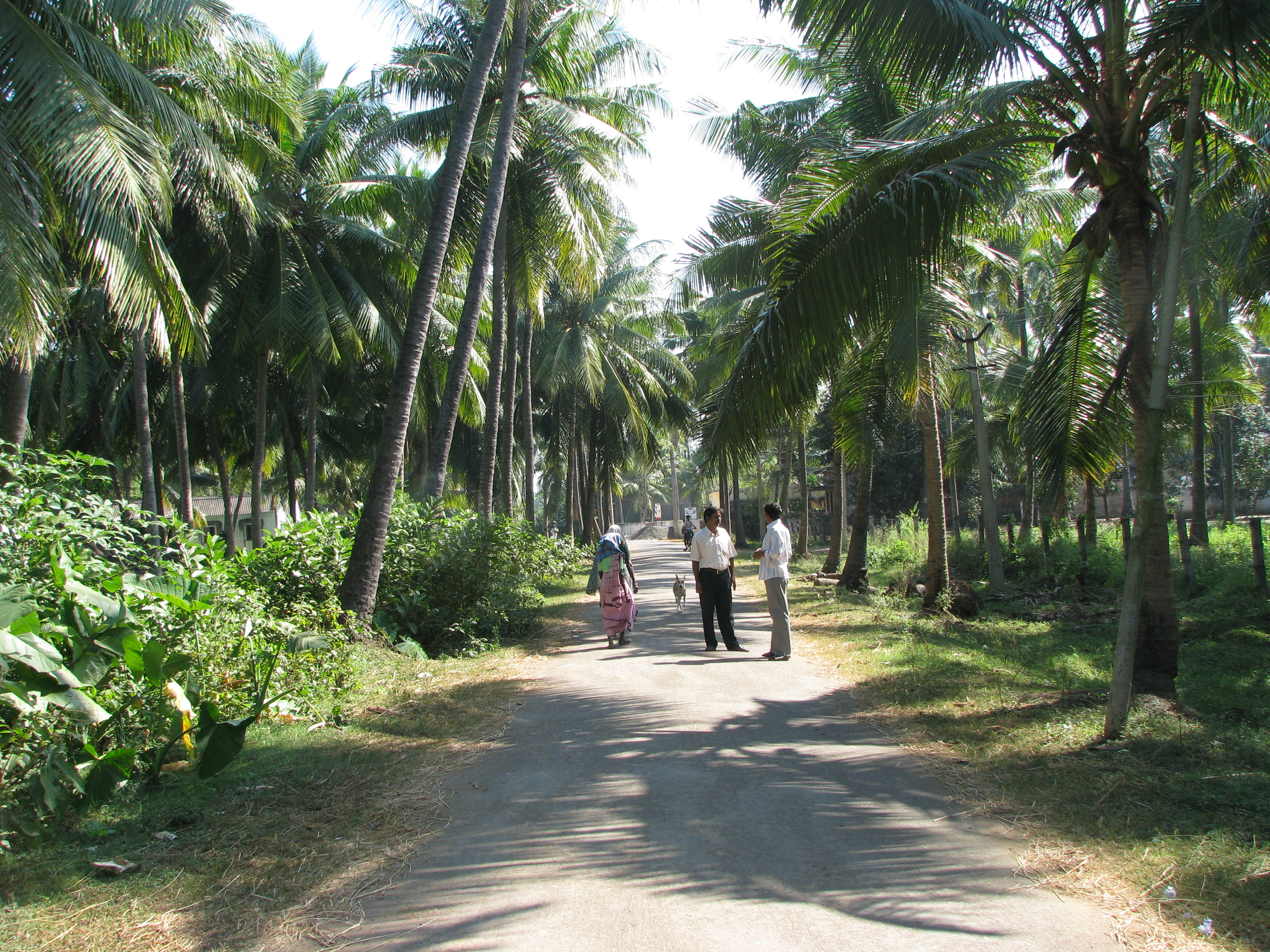
- Interactive map of Pedapudi
- Location in Andhra Pradesh, India Pedapudi (India)
- Coordinates: 16.9667°N 82.1667°E
- Country: India
- State: Andhra Pradesh
- District: Kakinada
- Elevation: 7 m (23 ft)

Languages
  - Official: Telugu
- Time zone: UTC+5:30 (IST)
- PIN: 533006
- Vehicle Registration: AP05 (Former); AP39 (from 30 January 2019)

Pedapudi or Peddapudi is a village and a Mandal in Kakinada district in the state of Andhra Pradesh in India.

== Geography ==
Peddapudi is located at 16.9667°N 82.1667°E. It has an average elevation of 7 meters (26 feet).

== See also ==
- Ganti Pedapudi
