= Krishna Bhagavan =

Indian Tollywood actor

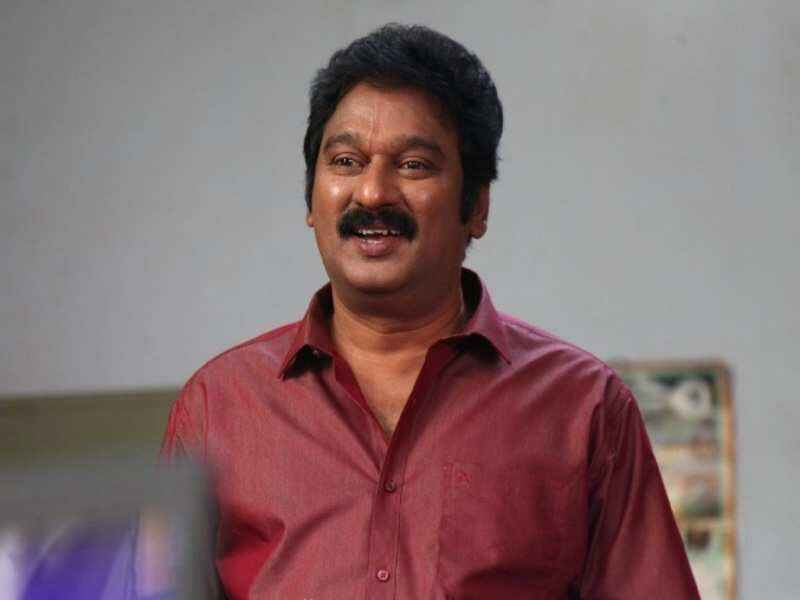
- Born: Meenavalli Paparao Chowdary; 2 July 1965 (age 60); Kaikavolu, East Godavari District, Andhra Pradesh, India
- Occupations: Film actor and writer
- Spouse: Lakshmidevi
- Parent(s): Meenavallli Lakshmikantham, Veerraju

Krishna Bhagavan (born Meenavalli Paparao Chowdary; 2 July 1965) is an Indian actor who works in Telugu cinema. He has appeared in more than 350 films, mostly as a comedian. He is also a writer.

== Early life ==
Krishna Bhagavan was born Meenavalli Paparao Chowdary in Kaikavolu, a small village in the East Godavari District to Meenavalli Lakshmikantham, Veerraju. He spent his childhood in Kaikavolu and went to Pedapudi to study at Gandhi Memorial School there. He used to cross farms and a small canal to go to his school.

== Personal life ==
Krishna Bhagavan married Lakshmidevi and has one daughter.

== Career ==
He was very interested in acting since childhood and acted in school plays. His first professional drama was Pending File, in which he played the role of Parandhamayya but, as he went on the stage, he forgot his lines completely. It was a memorable experience for him as a drama artiste.

He then went to Chennai to start his film career. He did a screen test for Kranti Kumar, where he was one among 300 people. He got an opportunity to act in that film but the producer's death halted the project.

After that he did Maharshi, for Sravanthi Ravi Kishore, along with Raghava, Nishanti and Ram Jagan. It was directed by Vamsy.

He then appeared in April 1st Vidudala, which was directed by Vamsy. He has done the script work for few movies including Detective Narada.

His career as an actor languished until he performed the role of Babji in the television serial Vasantha Kokila, directed by Uppalapati Narayana Rao, which won him the Andhra Pradesh State Nandi Award. Afterward, he acted in the movies Avunu Valliddaru Ista Paddaru! and Kabaddi Kabaddi.

After becoming a popular comedian, Krishna Bhagavan got offers as solo lead and acted in John Appa Rao 40 Plus, Donga Sachinollu, Mr. Girisham, Andhra Andagadu, and Bommana Brothers Chandana Sisters.

== Filmography ==
=== Telugu ===
Year	Title	Role	Notes
1988	Maharshi	Tilak	
1989	Chettu Kinda Pleader	Aadibabu	
1991	April 1 Vidudala	Gopichand	Also Writer
1991	Jaitra Yatra	Student	
1992	Detective Narada		Also Writer
1994	Prema And Co	Servant	Also Writer
1997	W/o V. Vara Prasad		Also Writer
2002	Avunu Valliddaru Ista Paddaru!	Chittibabu	
2003	Kabaddi Kabaddi	Bose	
2003	Ottesi Cheputunna		
2003	Ammayilu Abbayilu		
2003	Donga Ramudu and Party	Nanaji	
2003	Nenu Seetamahalakshmi		
2004	Lakshmi Narasimha	Police Inspector	
2004	Sankharavam	Villager	
2004	Andaru Dongale Dorikithe	Indra	
2004	Xtra		
2004	Oka Pellam Muddu Rendo Pellam Vaddu	Businessman	
2004	Naa Autograph	Bhagavan	
2004	Venky	Bhagawan	
2004	Samba	Pasupathi's sidekick	
2004	Sorry Naaku Pellaindi		
2004	Cheppave Chirugali	Producer's mad son	
2004	Mr & Mrs Sailaja Krishnamurthy	Guide Dev Anand	
2004	Aaptudu	Resident	
2004	Leela Mahal Center	Bujji	
2005	Evadi Gola Vaadidi	Gowri Shankar, Kadapa Reddemma's Husband	
2005	Pandem	Minister Appalanaidu	
2005	Mr. Errababu		
2005	Allari Bullodu		
2005	Konchem Touchlo Vunte Cheputanu		
2005	Soggadu	Railway Ticket Collector	
2005	Modati Cinema		
2005	Kanchanamala Cable TV		
2005	Andarivaadu	Govindraju's friend	
2006	Evandoi Srivaru	Watchman	
2006	Rajababu	Girisam	
2006	Maayajaalam	Ghost	
2007	Amma Cheppindi	Cook	
2007	Tata Birla Madhyalo Laila	Birla	
2007	Evadaithe Nakenti	Bala Gangadhar's PA	
2007	Dubai Seenu	Patnaik	
2007	Allare Allari		
2007	Toss		
2007	Yamagola Malli Modalayindi	Naradudu	
2007	Nindu Pournami		
2007	Mee Sreyobhilashi	Chitila China Rao	
2007	Pellaindi Kaani	Bhanupriya's Younger Brother	
2007	Seema Sastri		
2007	Bhajantreelu		
2008	Mangatayaru Tiffin Centre		
2008	Bommana Brothers Chandana Sisters	Tulasi Ram	
2008	John Appa Rao 40 Plus	John / Apparao	
2008	Donga Sachinollu		
2008	Kantri	Singapore Tour Guide	
2008	Victory	MRO Divadheenam	
2008	Kuberulu	Rambabu	
2008	Gajibiji		
2008	Andhra Andagadu		
2008	Kasi Patnam Chudara Babu		
2008	Siddu From Sikakulam		
2008	Souryam	Dr. Krishna Bhagawan	
2008	Dongala Bandi		
2008	Neninthe	Rambabu	
2008	Blade Babji	Taapi DharmaRao	
2008	King	Kona Venkat	
2008	Mr. Girisham	Girisham	
2009	Samarthudu		
2009	Malli Malli		
2009	Pistha	Muralikrishna's father	
2009	Gopi Gopika Godavari	Swathi Orchestra Manager	
2009	Sankham	Lawyer	
2009	Bendu Apparao R.M.P	Chitturi Chittabbai	
2009	Desadrohi		
2010	Shambo Shiva Shambo	Politician	
2010	Simha	Krishna Bhagavaan	
2010	Buridi		
2010	Yemaindi Ee Vela	Marriage registration office worker	
2010	Kathi Kantha Rao	Kantha Rao's brother-in-law	
2011	Shakti	David	
2012	Endukante... Premanta!	Raghava	
2012	Damarukam	Colony President	
2013	Punnami Ratri 3D	Ajay (Police Officer)	
2013	Mallamma		
2013	Kevvu Keka	Abrakadabra Appa Rao	
2014	Pandavulu Pandavulu Tummeda		
2014	Naa Rakumarudu	Dharmendra	
2014	Amrutham Chandamamalo		
2014	Oohalu Gusagusalade		Narrator
2014	Loukyam	Sastri	
2014	Ala Ela		
2015	James Bond	Marriage Bureau Chief	
2015	Shivam	IPod Shastry	
2015	Rudhramadevi		
2015	Shankarabaranam		
2015	Soukhyam		
2015	Mama Manchu Alludu Kanchu	Sanyasi Rao	
2016	Nenu Sailaja	Srinivas Rao's friend	
2016	Sardaar Gabbar Singh		
2016	Brahmotsavam	Babu's uncle	
2016	Oka Manasu		
2016	Selfie Raja		
2016	Naanna Nenu Naa Boyfriends		
2017	Aakatayi		
2017	Nenu Local	Constable	
2017	Fashion Designer s/o Ladies Tailor		
2017	Vaisakham		
2017	Nenu Kidnap Ayyanu		
2017	Two Countries		
2018	Raju Gadu	Gopi's assistant	
2018	Soda Goli Soda		
2018	Saakshyam	Soundarya's paternal uncle	
2018	Gangstars	P.K.R.	Web series
2018	My Dear Marthand		
2019	Raagala 24 Gantallo	Paul	also writer
2021	FCUK: Father Chitti Umaa Kaarthik		
2021	Nootokka Jillala Andagadu	God	
2022	Dhamaka	Diapers Company MD	
2023	Organic Mama Hybrid Alludu	Haasini's prospective groom's father	
2024	Bhale Unnade	Nagaraju	
2024	Utsavam		
2024	Keshava Chandra Ramavath		
2025	Mad Square	Judge	
2025	Bakasura Restaurant	Hotel Manager	
2025	Mowgli	John	
2026	Gaayapadda Simham	Bhagavan	
