= List of Telugu films of 1994 =

This is a list of films produced by the Telugu film industry) in the year 1994.

== List of released films ==
Title	Director	Cast	Music director	Sources
Aame	E. V. V. Satyanarayana	Srikanth, Naresh, Ooha	Vidyasagar	
Aavesam	Kodi Ramakrishna	Rajasekhar, Madhoo, Naghma	M. M. Keeravani	
Alibaba Aradajanu Dongalu	E. V. V. Satyanarayana	Rajendra Prasad, Bharathi, Ravali	Vidyasagar	
Allari Premikudu	K. Raghavendra Rao	Jagapathi Babu, Soundarya, Rambha	M. M. Keeravani	
Allarodu	K. Ajay Kumar	Rajendra Prasad, Surabhi		
Ammayi Kapuram	Muthyala Subbaiah	Ali, Maheswari		
Angarakshakudu	Joshi(Malayalam)	Rajasekhar, Meena, Brahmanandam	M. M. Keeravani	
Anna	Muthyala Subbaiah	Rajasekhar, Gouthami Tadimalla, Roja Selvamani	M. M. Keeravani	
Bangaru Kutumbam	Dasari Narayana Rao	Akkineni Nageswara Rao, Jayasudha, Harish	Raj–Koti	
Bhairava Dweepam	Singeetam Srinivasa Rao	Nandamuri Balakrishna, Roja Selvamani, Rambha	Madavapeddi Suresh	
Bhale Pellam	Kranthi Kumar	Jagapathi Babu, Meena, Rohini Hattangadi	Deva	
Bobbili Simham	A. Kodandarami Reddy	Nandamuri Balakrishna, Meena, Roja Selvamani	M. M. Keeravani	
Brahmachari Mogudu	Relangi Narasimha Rao	Rajendra Prasad, Yamuna, Satyanarayana Kaikala	Raj–Koti	
Captain	Kodi Ramakrishna	R. Sarathkumar, Sukanya, Ranjitha		
Criminal	Mahesh Bhatt	Nagarjuna, Ramya Krishna, Manisha Koirala	M. M. Keeravani	
Erra Sainyam	R. Narayana Murthy	R. Narayana Murthy, Narra Venkateswara Rao	Vandemataram Srinivas	
Gandeevam	Priyadarshan	Akkineni Nageswara Rao, Balakrishna, Mohanlal	M. M. Keeravani	
Gangmaster	B. Gopal	Rajasekhar, Nagma, Brahmanandam		
Gharana Alludu	Muppalaneni Shiva	Krishna, Malasri	M. M. Keeravani	
Govinda Govinda	Ram Gopal Varma	Nagarjuna Akkineni, Sridevi	Raj–Koti	
Hello Brother	E. V. V. Satyanarayana	Nagarjuna Akkineni, Soundarya, Ramya Krishna	Raj–Koti	
Jailor Gaari Abbayi	Sarath Babu	Krishnam Raju, Jayasudha, Jagapati Babu, Ramya Krishna		
Kishkindha Kanda	T. Prabhakar	Anand Babu, Padmasri, Chinna	M. M. Keeravani	
Lucky Chance	Siva Nageswara Rao	Rajendra Prasad, Kanchan		
M. Dharmaraju M.A.	Ravi Raja Pinisetty	Mohan Babu, Rambha	Raj–Koti	
Maa Voori Maaraju	Kodi Ramakrishna	Arjun, Soundarya, Priya Raman	Raj-Koti	
Madam	Singeetam Srinivasa Rao	Rajendra Prasad, Soundarya		
Maga Rayudu	E. V. V. Satyanarayana	Karthik, Vijayashanti		
Muddula Priyudu	K. Raghavendra Rao	Daggubati Venkatesh, Rambha, Ramya Krishna, Brahmanandam	M. M. Keeravani	
Mugguru Monagallu	K. Raghavendra Rao	Chiranjeevi, Naghma, Roja Selvamani, Ramya Krishna	Vidyasagar	
Number One	S. V. Krishna Reddy	Krishna, Soundarya	S. V. Krishna Reddy	
Palnati Pourusham	Muthyala Subbaiah	Krishnam Raju, Radhika, Charan Raj, Suresh	A. R. Rahman	
Pelli Koduku	Bapu	Naresh, Divya Vani, Sangeetha	M. M. Keeravani	
Punya Bhoomi Naa Desam	A. Kodandarami Reddy	Mohan Babu, Meena, Raj Kumar	Bappi Lahiri	
S. P. Parasuram	Raviraja Pinisetty	Chiranjeevi, Sridevi, Harish	M. M. Keeravani	
Subhalagnam	S. V. Krishna Reddy	Jagapathi Babu, Aamani, Roja Selvamani	S. V. Krishna Reddy	
Super Police	K. Muralimohan Rao	Daggubati Venkatesh, Naghma	A. R. Rahman	
Teerpu	Uppalapati Narayana Rao	Akkineni Nageswara Rao, Jagapathi Babu		
Top Hero	S. V. Krishna Reddy	Balakrishna, Soundarya, Brahmanandam	S. V. Krishna Reddy	
Vaddu Bava Thappu	K. Ajay Kumar	Rajendra Prasad, Ravali, Indraja		
Yamaleela	S. V. Krishna Reddy	Satyanarayana Kaikala, Ali, Brahmanandam, Indraja	S. V. Krishna Reddy	
