= Nandi Awards of 1994 =

Indian Telugu film and TV awards ceremony

Nandi Awards presented annually by Government of Andhra Pradesh. First awarded in 1964.

== 1994 Nandi Awards Winners List ==
Category	Winner	Film
Best Feature Film	Dasari Narayana Rao	Bangaru Kutumbam
Second Best Feature Film	S. V. Krishna Reddy	Subhalagnam
Third Best Feature Film	Singeetam Srinivasa Rao	Bhairava Dweepam
