= Maavi Chiguru =

- Movie Poster
- Directed by: S. V. Krishna Reddy
- Written by: Diwakar Babu (dialogues)
- Screenplay by: S. V. Krishna Reddy
- Story by: S. V. Krishna Reddy
- Produced by: P. Usha Rani
- Starring: Jagapathi Babu; Aamani; Ranjitha
- Cinematography: Sarath
- Edited by: K. Ramgopal Reddy
- Music by: S. V. Krishna Reddy
- Production companies: Sri Sravanthi Movies & Chandra Kiran Films
- Release date: 30 May 1996
- Running time: 141 minutes
- Country: India
- Language: Telugu

Maavi Chiguru (transl. New mango shoot) is a 1996 Indian Telugu-language drama film written and directed by S. V. Krishna Reddy. The film is produced by P. Usharani under Chandra Kiran Films and presented by Sri Sravanthi Movies. It stars Jagapathi Babu, Aamani, and Ranjitha with music composed by S. V. Krishna Reddy. The film was remade in Malayalam as Kumkumacheppu (1996), in Kannada as Mangalasutra (1997) and in Tamil as Thodarum (1999). The film won three Nandi Awards.

== Plot ==
The film begins with Madhu marrying an innocent and traditional girl, Seeta. She is very possessive of her husband. Soon after the wedding, she vexes Madhu with her overly affectionate nature and traditional attitude. After a while, the pair are blessed with a boy.

All goes well until a mischievous girl, Sudha, arrives. Sudha joins as Madhu's secretary. Once Madhu realizes that behind all the mischief lies a tragedy, a friendship develops. She had lost her parents. Upon learning that, Madhu hugs Sudha to console her. Seeta sees this and her suspicion regarding them turns into rage. She argues with Madhu and forbids him from touching her. From there, Seeta hounds Madhu in unusual ways.

Seeta generates bad propaganda by attributing an illicit affair between the two, which sullies Sudha's reputation. Thus, Madhu has no choice except to get Sudha home. Accordingly, Seeta quits and applies for divorce. Though Madhu adamantly opposes it, Seeta prevails and leaves their kid with her husband. During that plight, Sudha moves to rectify the chaos. An astonished Seeta reveals that she is terminally ill and has a heart problem. Hence, Seeta made this play to bring Madhu and Sudha together, to afford her husband and young son a new life and happiness. Now, Seeta pleads with Sudha to get Madhu ready for marriage, which she does. At last, Sudha reveals the truth and Seeta lives to see her final wishes fulfilled. The movie ends with Madhu & Sudha leading a delightful life and naming their daughter Seeta.

== Cast ==
- Jagapati Babu as Madhu
- Aamani as Seetha
- Ranjitha as Sudha
- Brahmanandam as Head Clerk
- Babu Mohan as Gopi
- Ali as Peon
- Tanikella Bharani as Lawyer Satyanandam
- Giri Babu as Madhu's boss
- Allu Ramalingaiah Sita's grandfather
- Sivaji Raja as Assistant lawyer
- Subbaraya Sharma as Judge
- P. J. Sarma as Doctor
- Gundu Hanumantha Rao as Departmental Store Owner
- Ironleg Sastri as Bujjulu
- Dham as Raktha Cola
- Jenny
- Kishore Rathi
- Sri Lakshmi as Radha
- Siva Parvati as Satyanandam's wife
- Madhurima as item number
- Nirmalamma as Sita's grandmother

== Soundtrack ==
Maavi Chiguru

Film score by S. V. Krishna Reddy
- Released: 1996
- Genre: Soundtrack
- Length: 26:31
- Label: T-Series
- Producer: S. V. Krishna Reddy

S. V. Krishna Reddy chronology
Gunshot (1996)	Maavi Chiguru (1996)	Vinodam (1996)

Music composed by S. V. Krishna Reddy. Music is released on T-Series Music Company. "Ramju Bhale Ramchilaka" was copied from Aradhana (1969)'s "Roop Tera Mastana". All the songs were well received with the track "Maataivvamma" becoming a chartbuster. Rendered by Chitra, she won the Nandi Award for best playback singer, female.

Track listing
No.	Title	Lyrics	Singer(s)	Length
1.	"Kodanda Ramudanta"	Sirivennela Seetharama Sastry	S. P. Balasubrahmanyam, Jagapati Babu, Vandemataram Srinivas, Prasanna, Allu Ramalingaiah, M. M. Srilekha, Renuka	4:49
2.	"Kommana Kulike Koyila"	Bhuvanachandra	S. P. Balasubrahmanyam, K. S. Chithra	4:31
3.	"Mata Ivvamma Chelli"	Sirivennela Seetharama Sastry	K. S. Chithra	4:44
4.	"Kondamalli Kondaamalli"	Bhuvanachandra	S. P. Balasubrahmanyam, K. S. Chithra	4:47
5.	"Ramju Bhale Ramchilaka"	Sirivennela Seetharama Sastry	S. P. Balasubrahmanyam, Anupama	3:37
6.	"Manasa Sancharare"	Sadasiva Brahmendra	S. P. Balasubrahmanyam	0:59
7.	"Maavichiguru Thini"	Sirivennela Seetharama Sastry	S. P. Balasubrahmanyam, K. S. Chithra	4:54
Total length:				28:21

== Reception ==
A critic from Andhra Today stated that "But the treatment is good and all credit is due to the director. Diwakar Babu's dialogues have helped in the movie becoming a success. The main characters do well and the songs are good".

== Awards ==
Nandi Awards

- Best Actor - Jagapati Babu
- Best Supporting Actress - Ranjitha
- Best Female Playback Singer - K. S. Chithra
