= Subbaraya Sarma =

Indian actor (born 1947)

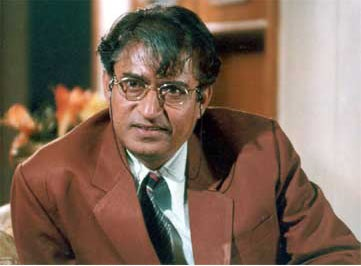
- Born: Uppaluri Subbaraya Sarma; 3 January 1947 (age 79); Vijayawada, Andhra Pradesh, India
- Occupation: Actor
- Years active: 1967–present

Subbaraya Sarma is an Indian actor known for his works in Telugu cinema, theatre, and television. In a film career spanning more than fifty years, Sarma played a variety of roles as a character actor and comedian.

In 1989, he received the Tri-Annual Best Actor award for the play Onteddu Bandi written by L. B. Sriram. Sarma is best known for his acting in works such as Srivariki Premalekha (1984), Bava Bava Panneeru (1989), Yamaleela (1994), Subha Lagnam (1994), Mayalodu (1993), Matrudevobhava (1993), Gangotri (2003), Magadheera (2009), Top Hero (1994), Dharma Chakram (1996), Manasantha Nuvve (2001), Baahubali: The Beginning (2015), and Rudhramadevi (2015).

== Selected filmography ==
=== Films ===
Year	Title	Role	Notes
1984	Srivariki Premalekha	Purohitudu	
1987	Yugakartalu		
1987	Chandamama Raave		
1988	O Bharya Katha	Prospective bridegroom's father	
1988	Aahuthi		
1988	Rudraveena		
1989	Hai Hai Nayaka		
1989	Bava Bava Panneeru		
1991	Vichitra Prema		
1991	Indra Bhavanam		
1991	Minor Raja		
1993	Ladies Special		
1993	Mayalodu		
1993	Matrudevobhava	Ananthaswami	
1994	Number One		
1994	Subha Lagnam	Lata's father	
1994	Top Hero		
1994	Yamaleela		
1995	Rikshavodu		
1995	Alibaba Adbhuta Deepam	Rao, Indu's father	
1995	Dear Brother		
1995	Sisindri		
1995	Ghatothkachudu		
1996	Dharma Chakram		
1996	Nayudu Gari Kutumbam		
1996	College Student		
1996	Amma Durgamma		
1996	Gunshot		
1996	Akkum Bakkum		
1996	Maavichiguru	Judge	
1997	Korukunna Priyudu		
1997	Priya O Priya		
1997	Kaliyugamlo Gandargolam		
1997	Egire Paavurama		
1997	Priyamaina Srivaru		
1997	Omkaram		
1997	Pelli Chesukundam		
1997	W/o V. Vara Prasad		
1998	Ganesh		
1998	Subbaraju Gari Kutumbam		
1998	Pandaga		
1998	Deergha Sumangali Bhava		
1998	Navvulata		
1998	Pelli Peetalu		
1998	Sreevarante Maavare		
1998	Pelladi Chupista		
1998	Suprabhatam		
1999	Vichitram	D.S.P. Tirupathi	
1999	Anaganaga Oka Ammai		
1999	Premaku Velayara		
1999	Swapnalokam		
1999	Iddaru Mitrulu		
2000	Sardukupodaam Randi		
2000	Kauravudu		
2000	Sri Srimathi Satyabhama		
2000	Balaram		
2000	Sakutumba Saparivaara Sametam		
2000	Annayya		
2000	Kodanda Ramudu		
2001	Manasantha Nuvve		
2001	Prematho Raa		
2001	Student No: 1		
2001	Preminchu		
2002	Nee Sneham		
2002	2 Much		
2002	Adrustham		
2002	Vasu		
2002	Neethone Vuntanu		
2002	Nuvvu Leka Nenu Lenu		
2003	Tagore		
2003	Gangotri		
2003	Pellam Oorelithe		
2004	Koduku		
2004	Guri	Subash Chandra Bose's father	
2005	Pandem		
2005	Chatrapathi		
2005	Subhash Chandra Bose		
2005	Allari Pidugu		
2006	Sri Ramadasu		
2006	Kokila		
2007	Sri Satyanarayana Swamy		
2007	Bhajantrilu		
2007	Yamadonga		
2007	Maharadhi		
2008	Souryam		
2008	Pandurangadu		
2008	Nagaram		
2009	Sankham		
2009	Magadheera	Gurudevulu	
2009	Vengamamba		
2009	Aa Intlo		
2010	Maryada Ramanna		
2010	Priyamaina Anjali		
2010	Panchakshari		
2011	Anaganaga O Dheerudu		
2011	Sri Rama Rajyam	Viswamitra	
2014	Galipatam		
2014	Maha Bhaktha Siryala		
2015	Baahubali: The Beginning		
2015	Rudhramadevi		
2021	Skylab		
2025	Hari Hara Veera Mallu	Madanna	
2025	Chiranjeeva		

=== Television ===
- Popula Pette (1997)
- Rambo in Love (2025)
