= Vichitra Prema =

- Directed by: Jandhyala
- Written by: Jandhyala (screenplay / dialogues)
- Story by: Bhamidipati Radha Krishna
- Produced by: A. Suryanarayana
- Starring: Rajendra Prasad; Amrutha
- Cinematography: Babji
- Edited by: Gautam Raju
- Music by: K. V. Mahadevan
- Production company: Sri Lakshmi Narayana Enterprises
- Release date: 1991
- Running time: 132 mins
- Country: India
- Language: Telugu

Vichitra Prema (transl. Variety Love) is a 1991 Telugu-language comedy film produced by A. Suryanarayana under the Sri Lakshmi Narayana Enterprises banner and directed by Jandhyala. It stars Rajendra Prasad and Amurtha, with music composed by K. V. Mahadevan.

== Cast ==
- Rajendra Prasad as Sivudu
- Amurtha as Parvathi
- Brahmanandam as Babji
- Dharmavarapu Subramanyam as Murthy
- Suthi Velu as Gaali Venkatarao
- Gundu Hanumantha Rao as Aarmughan
- Subbaraya Sharma as Seetapathi
- Abhishith Varma as Major Pratapa Varma
- Navabharat Balaji as Avinash
- Jenny as Taxi driver
- Sri Lakshmi as Krishnaveni / Krishti
- Jayalalita as Kalpana
- Nagamani as Lakshmi
- K. Vijayalakshmi as Saraswathi

== Soundtrack ==
Vichitra Prema

Film score by K. V. Mahadevan
- Released: 1991
- Genre: Soundtrack
- Length: 17:05
- Label: AVM Audio
- Producer: K. V. Mahadevan

K. V. Mahadevan chronology
Godavari Pongindhi (1991)	Vichitra Prema (1991)	Manjeera Nadam (1991)

The music was composed by K. V. Mahadevan and the lyrics were written by Veturi. Music released on AVM Audio Company.

S. No.	Song title	Singers	length
1	"Aarintiki Modalaye Anuragam"	S. P. Balasubrahmanyam, Chitra	4:32
2	"Manasa Sancharare"	S. P. Balasubrahmanyam, Chitra	3:54
3	"Chiluku Chera"	S. P. Balasubrahmanyam, Chitra	4:31
4	"Kalusukoni"	S. P. Balasubrahmanyam, Chitra	4:08
