= Babu Mohan =

Indian actor, politician (born 1952)

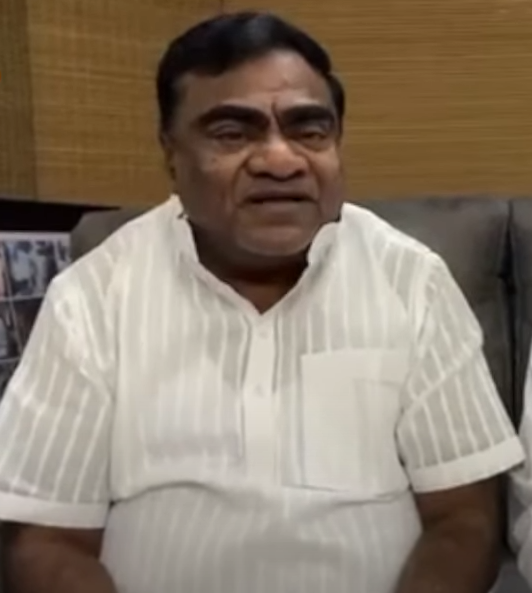
- Babu Mohan in 2022

Minister for Labour, Andhra Pradesh
- In office 11 September 2002 – 14 May 2004
- Chief Minister: N. Chandrababu Naidu

Member of Legislative Assembly, Andhra Pradesh
- In office 1998–2004
- Preceded by: Malyala Rajaiah
- Succeeded by: Damodar Raja Narasimha
- Constituency: Andole

Member of Legislative Assembly, Telangana
- In office 2014–2018
- Preceded by: Damodar Raja Narasimha
- Succeeded by: Chanti Kranthi Kiran
- Constituency: Andole

Personal details
- Born: 14 April 1952 (age 74) Beerolu, Khammam district, Telangana, India
- Party: Telugu Desam Party (1990's–2014; since 2024)
- Other political affiliations: NTR Telugu Desam Party (Lakshmi Parvathi); Telangana Rashtra Samithi (2014–2018); Bharatiya Janata Party (2018–2024); Praja Shanti Party (2024)
- Spouse: Indira Vijaya Lakshmi
- Occupation: Actor and politician

Pally Babu Mohan commonly known as Babu Mohan is an Indian actor and politician formerly from the Bharatiya Janata Party. He prominently works in Telugu films as a comedian and is a former Minister for Labour in Andhra Pradesh. He won Nandi Award for Best Male Comedian for his role in Mamagaru.

== Early life ==
Babu Mohan was born in Beerolu, Khammam district of Telangana, India. His father was a teacher. He worked as a government employee in the revenue department of Andhra Pradesh. He later left this job to pursue his interest in films.

== Film career ==
Babu Mohan debuted in the film Ee Prasnaku Baduledi, followed by Ahuthi (directed by Kodi Ramakrishna), Ankusam and then a comedy character in Mamagaru. The last of these established his reputation as a comedian. After this film, Babu Mohan and Kota Srinivasa Rao developed a comedy partnership and are one of the most celebrated duos, for which many producers created special characters. The pair played in Mayalodu, Rajendrudu Gajendrudu, and other films, the majority of which were directed by S. V. Krishna Reddy.

Babu Mohan also paired with Brahmanandam. Their films include Hello Brother, Varasudu, Allari Alludu, Inspector Ashwini, Pedarayudu, Paradesi, Appula Appa Rao and Jamba Lakidi Pamba.

== Political career ==
Babu Mohan was a staunch supporter of N. T. Rama Rao from his early days, and this led him to join the Telugu Desam Party. He contested the 1998 Lok Sabha elections from the Amalapuram Lok Sabha constituency on behalf of the NTR Telugu Desam Party (Lakshmi Parvathi) but lost. He was first elected as an MLA in the 1998 by-elections and retained the seat in 1999 from Andole Assembly constituency in Medak district serving as a Minister for Labour in the N. Chandrababu Naidu's cabinet. In the general elections, held in 2004 and 2009, he lost to the previous Deputy Chief Minister Damodar Raja Narasimha. In the year 2014, he quit Telugu Desam Party to join Telangana Rashtra Samithi.

He joined Telangana Rashtra Samithi and in 2014 general elections he won again as an MLA from the same constituency against Damodar Raja Narasimha. Later in the year 2018, he joined Bharatiya Janata Party. On October 28, 2023, he announced that he will be resigning from the party, citing insult and deliberate exclusion, particularly by individuals like Kishan Reddy and Bandi Sanjay, as the reasons for his decision. In March 2024 he has joined the Praja Shanti Party and quit the party one month later. In 2024, he took the membership of Telugu Desam Party.

== Personal life ==
Mohan is married to Indira Vijaya Lakshmi. Their eldest son, Pally Pavan Kumar, died in a road accident on 12 October 2003.

== Filmography ==
List of film credits
Year	Title	Role	Notes and Ref.
1986	Ee Prasnaku Baduledi		
1986	Punnagai Mannan		Tamil
1987	Aha Naa Pellanta		
1987	Peliloi Pellillu		
1987	Ramu		
1987	Yuga Karthalu		
1988	Aahuti		
1988	Atmakatha		
1988	Tiragabadda Telugubidda		
1989	Ankusam	Venkatarathnam	
1989	Pape Maa Pranam	Vinayakam	
1989	Manchivaaru Maavaaru		
1989	Mamathala Kovela		
1989	Rajakeeya Chadarangam		
1990	20va Sathabdam		
1990	Aayudham		
1990	Aggiramudu		
1990	Balachandrudu		
1990	Bobbili Raja		
1990	Iddaru Iddare		
1990	Karthavyam		
1990	Muddula Menalludu		
1990	Nari Nari Muddula Murali		
1990	Prajala Manishi	Shambhu	
1990	Rao Gari Intlo Rowdy		
1991	Aditya 369		
1991	Amma Rajinama		
1991	Coolie No. 1		
1991	Edurinti Mogudu Pakkinti Pellam		
1991	Aagraham		
1991	Mamagaru		
1991	Peddintalludu		
1991	Parama Sivudu		
1991	Ramudu Kadhu Rakshasudu		
1991	Rowdy Gari Pellam		
1991	Stuvartpuram Dongalu		
1991	Sathruvu		
1991	Stuartpuram Police Station		
1991	Vidhata	Ananda Naidu	
1992	Aa Okkati Adakku		
1992	Attasommu Alludu Danam		
1992	Ahankari		
1992	Alexander		
1992	Appula Appa Rao		
1992	Aswamedhan		
1992	Bhale Khaideelu		
1992	Bangaru Mama		
1992	Chinarayudu		
1992	Chilara Mogudu Allari Koduku		
1992	Gang War		
1992	Gowramma		
1992	Joker Mama Super Alludu	Singaram	
1992	Jagannatham & Sons		
1992	Marutode Naa Mogudu		
1992	Prema Sikharam		
1992	Pachani Samsaram		
1992	Public Rowdy		
1992	Pranadaata		
1992	Pellam Chepithe Vinali		
1992	Pellaniki Premalekha Priyuraliki Subhalekha		
1992	Repati Koduku		
1992	Seetharatnam Gari Abbayi		
1992	Subba Rayudi Pelli		
1993	Akka Pettanam Chelleli Kapuram		
1993	Attaku Koduku Mamaku Alludu		
1993	Abbayigaru		
1993	Allari Priyudu		
1993	Allari Alludu		
1993	Bava Bavamaridi		
1993	Chinna Alludu		
1993	Chittemma Mogudu		
1993	Chirunavvula Varamistava		
1993	Donga Alludu		
1993	Enti Bava Mareenu		
1993	Inspector Ashwini		
1993	Ish Gup Chup		
1993	Jamba Lakidi Pamba		
1993	Jeevithame Oka Cinema		
1993	Kokkoroko		
1993	Kunti Puthrudu		
1993	Kalachakram		
1993	Konguchaatu Krishnudu		
1993	Manavarali Pelli	Bulli Raju	
1993	Mayalodu		
1993	Nippu Ravva		
1993	Naga Jyothi		
1993	One By Two		
1993	Pellama Majaka		
1993	Radha Saradhi		
1993	Rajendrudu Gajendrudu		
1993	Sarasaala Soggadu	Psychiatrist Subba Rao	
1993	Vintha Kodallu		
1993	Varasudu		
1994	Allari Police		
1994	Andaru Andare		
1994	Alludu Poru Ammayi Joru		
1994	Bangaru Mogudu		
1994	Bangaru Kutumbam		
1994	Bhairava Dweepam		
1994	Donga Rascal		
1994	Hello Brother		
1994	Hello Alludu		
1994	Jailor Gaari Abbayi		
1994	Jeevitha Khaidi		
1994	Kishkindha Kanda		
1994	Kurradhi Kurradu		Special appearance in a song
1994	Mugguru Monagallu		
1994	Muddula Priyudu		
1994	Nannagaru		
1994	Number One		
1994	Police Brothers		
1994	Pelli Koduku		
1994	Punya Bhoomi Naa Desam		
1994	Raithu Bharatam		
1994	Sundaravadana Subbalakshmi Moguda		
1995	Aayanaki Iddaru		
1995	Ammoru		
1995	Alibaba Adbhuta Deepam	Bazooka the Genie	
1995	Big Boss		
1995	Bhale Bullodu		
1995	Dear Brother		
1995	God Father		
1995	Khaidi Inspector	John Babu	
1995	Kondapalli Rathaiah		
1995	Leader		
1995	Mayabazaar		
1995	Muddayi Muddugumma		
1995	Real Hero		
1995	Pedarayudu		
1995	Sisindri		
1995	Subhamasthu		
1995	Sankalpam		
1995	Taj Mahal		
1995	Vaddu Bava Thappu		
1995	Vajram		
1996	Akkada Ammayi Ikkada Abbayi		
1996	Amma Durgamma		
1996	Bobbili Bullodu		
1996	Bombay Priyudu		
1996	Gunshot		
1996	Intlo Illalu Vantintlo Priyuralu		
1996	Maavichiguru		
1996	Pittala Dora		
1996	Once More		
1996	Oho Naa Pellanta		
1996	Pelli Sandadi		
1996	Ramudochadu		
1996	Topi Raja Sweety Roja		
1996	Vinodam		
1997	Aahvaanam		
1997	Annamayya		
1997	Allari Pellikoduku		
1997	Aaro Pranam		
1997	Ayyinda Leda	Peter	
1997	Bobbili Dora		
1997	Collector Garu		
1997	Circus Sattipandu		
1997	Dongaata		
1997	Evandi Pelli Chesukondi		
1997	Egire Paavurama		
1997	Hitler		
1997	Kaliyugam Lo Gandargolam		
1997	Osi Naa Maradala		
1997	Preminchukundam Raa		
1997	Pattukondi Chuddam		
1997	Taraka Ramudu		
1997	Thoka Leni Pitta		
1997	Ugadi		
1998	Antahpuram		
1998	Asala Sandadi		
1998	Auto Driver		
1998	Ganesh		
1998	Illalu		
1998	Kodukulu		
1998	Life Lo Wife		
1998	Navvulata		
1998	Priyuralu		Dubbed into Malayalam as Manjeeradhwani
1998	Paradesi		
1998	Pandaga		
1998	Raayudu		
1998	Subhalekhalu		
1998	Subbaraju Gari Kutumbam		
1998	Srimathi Vellostha		
1998	Ulta Palta		
1999	Bala Veerulu		
1999	Sneham Kosam		
1999	Devi		
1999	Vichitram	Yadagiri	
1999	Pilla Nachindi		
1999	Preminche Manasu		
1999	Naa Hrudayamlo Nidurinche Cheli		
1999	Hello...Yama!	Chitragupta	
2000	Aawaragaadu		
2000	Oke Maata		
2000	Kann Thirandhu Paaramma		Tamil film; Dubbed in Telugu as Devi Bhavani
2000	Naga Devathe		Kannada film
2000	Sakutumba Saparivaara Sametam		
2001	Devi Putrudu		
2001	Pandanti Samsaram		
2001	Family Circus		
2001	Nuvvu Naaku Nachav		
2001	Orey Thammudu		
2001	Bhadrachalam		
2002	O Chinadana		
2002	Malli Malli Chudali		
2002	H2O	Kirik	Kannada film
2002	Vachina Vaadu Suryudu		
2003	Ammulu		
2003	Ottesi Cheputunna		
2004	Satruvu		
2004	Suryam		
2005	Evadi Gola Vaadidhi		
2005	Keelu Gurram	Lawyer	
2005	Orey Pandu	Man who spits on plant	
2005	Youth	Velu's father (college lecturer)	
2005	Mardangi		
2005	Orey Pandu		
2005	Subash Chandra Bose		
2005	Sravanamasam		
2006	Kithakithalu	House owner	
2007	Evadaithe Nakenti		
2007	Satyabhama		
2008	Aalayam		
2008	Aatadista		
2008	Hero		
2008	Sri Medaram Sammakka Sarakka Mahatyam		
2008	Veedu Mamoolodu Kadu	Police Inspector	
2009	Adbutha Vaidyam Ayurvedam		
2009	Junction		
2009	Mondi Mogullu Penki Pellalu		
2010	Badmaash		
2010	Comedy Express		
2010	Jai Bhadrakali		
2011	Guruvaram		
2011	Nagaram Nidra Pothuna Vela		
2011	Subhodayam		
2011	Sandhya		
2011	Varoodhini.Com		
2012	All the Best		
2012	Chalo One Two Three		
2012	Hostel Days		
2013	1000 Abaddalu		
2013	Ayomayam Apartment		
2014	Sri Vasavi Kanyaka Parameswari Charitra		
2015	Lava Kusa		
2023	Organic Mama Hybrid Alludu	Mohan	
2024	Mr. Bachchan	Politician	
2025	Uppu Kappurambu	Bheemayya	
2025	Kothapallilo Okappudu	MLA	
2026	Hey Balwanth	Mithra’s grandfather	
2026	Abadameva jayathe †	Patela	
2026	The Paradise †		

=== As dubbing artist ===
Year	Title	Actor	Notes
1993	Gentleman	Senthil	Telugu dubbed version
1996	Bharatyeedu	Senthil	Telugu dubbed version
