= Hungama (2005 film) =

- Directed by: S. V. Krishna Reddy
- Written by: Janardhana Maharshi (dialogues); S. V. Krishna Reddy (story)
- Produced by: R. R. Venkat
- Starring: Ali; Venu Madhav
- Cinematography: V Srinivas Reddy
- Edited by: V.Nagi Reddy
- Music by: S. V. Krishna Reddy
- Distributed by: RR Moviemakers
- Release date: 28 April 2005
- Running time: 140 min.
- Country: India
- Language: Telugu

Hungama is 2005 Indian Telugu-language comedy film directed by S. V. Krishna Reddy starring Ali and Venu Madhav. The film is a remake of the Malayalam film Mattupetti Machan (1998). Hungama was successful at the box office.

== Plot ==
Pedda Babu and Chinna Babu are step brothers and also neighbors each with a beautiful daughter. Balaraju gets insulted when he visits the house of Chinna Babu for a marriage proposal. Balaraju wants to seek revenge by making sure that Vidya Jyothi – daughter of Chinna Babu – would get the worst youngster as husband.

After research, Balaraju closes on Balu who is an herb selling fraudster. Due to certain misunderstanding, he enters the house of Peda Babu and tries seducing his daughter, Divya. Bala Raju finds another worthless youngster called Badri who is a pimp by profession. Both Balu and Badri claim themselves as sons of billionaire Jamindar to impress Chinna Babu and Pedda Babu. Balu and Badri make Divya and Vidya fall in love with them respectively. The film ends with how the characters' lives end well.

== Cast ==
- Ali as Badri
- Venu Madhav as Balu
- Abhinayashree as Divya
- Jyothi as Vidya
- Kota Srinivasa Rao as Pedda Babu
- Tanikella Bharani as Chinna Babu
- Amukta Malyada
- Brahmanandam
- Narsing Yadav
- M. S. Narayana
- Rajendra Babu
- Ramaraju
- Dharmavarapu Subramanyam
- Sunil as Balaraju
- Gundu Hanumantha Rao
- Raghu Babu
- Jayalalitha
- Sobharani
- Sobhana
- Vimala Sri

== Soundtrack ==
- "Muthamma Muthamma"
- "Manikya Veena"
- "Chiru Chiru"

== Reception ==
Sify wrote "S.V.Krishna Reddy is back with yet another comedy that fails to impress. It is nothing but slapstick galore with mistaken identities and lot of double meaning dialogues." Idlebrain.com gave 2.75 stars out of 5 and opined that first half of the film is mediocre and get a little better in the latter half.
