= Egire Paavurama =

- DVD cover
- Directed by: S. V. Krishna Reddy
- Written by: Marudhuri Raja (dialogues)
- Screenplay by: S. V. Krishna Reddy
- Story by: A. K. Lohithadas
- Produced by: P. Usha Rani
- Starring: J. D. Chakravarthy; Srikanth; Laila
- Cinematography: Sarath
- Edited by: K. Ramgopal Reddy
- Music by: S. V. Krishna Reddy
- Production companies: Sri Sravanthi Movies & Chandra Kiran Films
- Release date: 30 January 1997
- Running time: 144 minutes
- Country: India
- Language: Telugu

Egire Paavurama (transl. Flying pigeon) is a 1997 Indian Telugu-language romantic comedy film directed by S. V. Krishna Reddy. The film stars J. D. Chakravarthy, Srikanth, and Laila. The music was composed by S. V. Krishna Reddy. It is a remake of the Malayalam film Sallapam (1996).

== Cast ==
- J. D. Chakravarthy as Siva
- Srikanth as Balasubrahmanyam
- Laila as Jyothi
- Suhasini Maniratnam as Yasodha
- Nirmalamma as Jyothi's grandmother; Siva's mother
- Kota Srinivasa Rao
- Brahmanandam
- Babu Mohan
- Tanikella Bharani as Simhachalam
- Charan Raj as Yasodha's husband
- Sivaji Raja
- Chittibabu as Simhachalam's assistant
- Gundu Hanumantha Rao as Simhachalam's assistant
- Kallu Chidambaram as Simhachalam's assistant
- Gautam Raju as Simhachalam's assistant
- Subbaraya Sharma as Jyothi's father
- Y. Vijaya as Saraswati
- Jenny as Saraswati's husband
- Akkiraju Sundara Rama Krishna as Saraswati's brother; Balasubramanyam's master
- Sri Lakshmi
- Jhansi as Saraswati's daughter
- Kalpana
- Swathi
- Baby Shravanthi
- Master Siddarth

== Soundtrack ==
All music is composed by S. V. Krishna Reddy. The song "Maagha Maasam" is based on "Panchavarna Painkili Penne" from Sallapam (1996)

Track list
No.	Title	Lyrics	Singer(s)	Length
1.	"Maagha Maasam"	Veturi	Sunitha	4:44
2.	"Runa Laila Vanalaga"	Bhuvana Chandra	Hariharan, Sunitha	5:20
3.	"Aaha Emi Ruchi"	Sirivennela	K. S. Chithra	3:50
4.	"Egire Paavuramaa"	Veturi	S. P. Balasubrahmanyam	4:33
5.	"Gunde Gutiki"	Sirivennela	Unnikrishnan, Sunitha	4:18
6.	"Brahmalu Gurubrahmalu"	Veturi	S. P. Balasubrahmanyam	4:25
7.	"Chitapata Chinukula Talam"	Sirivennela	K. S. Chithra, S. P. Balasubrahmanyam	5:19
8.	"This Is The Rhythm Of The Life"	Bhuvana Chandra	Mano, Sunitha	5:25
Total length:				37:57

== Reception ==
A critic from Andhra Today opined that "The director does not portray how the ensuing conflict develops between the characters of the love triangle. The main story seems to have been sidelined with the comedy track gaining in prominence".
