= Ghatothkachudu =

1995 Telugu film by S. V. Krishna Reddy

- DVD Cover
- Directed by: S. V. Krishna Reddy
- Written by: Diwakar Babu (dialogues)
- Screenplay by: S. V. Krishna Reddy
- Story by: S. V. Krishna Reddy; K. Atchi Reddy
- Produced by: K. Atchi Reddy; Kishore Rathi (presents)
- Starring: Satyanarayana; Ali; Roja
- Cinematography: Sarath
- Edited by: K. Ramgopal Reddy
- Music by: S. V. Krishna Reddy
- Production company: Manisha Films
- Release date: 31 March 1995
- Running time: 170 minutes
- Country: India
- Language: Telugu

Ghatothkachudu (transl. Ghatotkacha) is a 1995 Telugu-language fantasy comedy film co-written, directed and composed by S. V. Krishna Reddy. The film was produced by K. Atchi Reddy and stars Satyanarayana in the title role, with Ali and Roja in prominent roles. Other key cast members include Baby Nikita, AVS, Kota Srinivasa Rao, Tanikella Bharani, Brahmanandam, and Tinnu Anand. The film also features cameo appearances by Nagarjuna, Rajasekhar, and Srikanth. Ghatothkachudu was a commercial success at the box office.

== Plot ==
The film follows the mythological character Ghatotkacha, who is mortally wounded in the Kurukshetra War. As he lies dying, he is aided by a young tribal girl who offers him water. In gratitude, Ghatotkacha promises to repay her kindness when she is in need.

Centuries later, the girl is reborn as Chitti, the only heir to a wealthy family of NRIs. Chitti's parents, Koteswara Rao and Sudha, are targeted by two relatives, Chalapathi and his son, who plot to murder them and inherit their wealth. Basanna, a mute servant in the family, saves Chitti from several assassination attempts. However, Chalapathi and his cronies eventually succeed in throwing Basanna out of the house and attempt to kill Chitti's family. They plant a bomb in the family's car, killing her parents but sparing Chitti. Basanna sacrifices his life to save her, and Chitti is later rescued by Basanna's son, Ranga. Ranga, along with Chitti, flees and eventually takes refuge in a forest. As they are cornered by the assassins, Chitti calls for help, and Ghatotkacha, remembering his promise, appears to save her.

In a separate storyline, a Robocop-styled robot named Subba Rao saves Roja from a bald-headed criminal (AVS), who attempts to murder her. Subba Rao falls in love with Roja and frequently visits Ghatotkacha, Chitti, and Roja, often clashing with Ranga.

Chalapathi, Thota Ramudu, and their associates continue their attempts to kill Chitti. They succeed in killing her before Ghatotkacha, enraged, destroys Subba Rao’s 10,000-watt power. Ghatotkacha pleads to Lord Anjaneya to restore Chitti's life. In response, Ghatotkacha becomes a supergiant and uses his powers to reverse time, saving Chitti before her death and thwarting the villains.

Ghatotkacha reprograms Subba Rao to defeat the villains. Subba Rao kills Chalapathi by redirecting a laser beam, while Ghatotkacha plays tennis with the wizard's head. Ghatotkacha also defeats the bald-headed criminal and the scientist who created Subba Rao. As punishment for betraying Ghatotkacha, Thota Ramudu is forced to remain on a scrap collector's TV.

In the climax, Chalapathi's son and the wizard's henchmen are involved in a chaotic accident, where a ball controlled by a watch multiplies into hundreds of balls. After Subba Rao completes his task, Ghatotkacha reduces his power from 10,000 watts to a manageable 220 watts.

== Cast ==
- Ali as Ranga
- Satyanarayana as Ghatotkacha
- Roja as Roja
- Baby Nikita as Chitti
- Sarath Babu as Koteswara Rao, Chitti's father
- Tinnu Anand as Scientist
- Brahmanandam as Brahmam "Pilaka", an artifact Collector
- Kota Srinivasa Rao as wizard
- Chalapathi Rao as Chalapathi Rao, the main villain
- Sivaji Raja as Chalapathi's son
- Tanikella Bharani as Thota Ramudu
- Rallapalli as Basanna "Kaka"
- Gundu Hanumantha Rao as Ranga's friend
- AVS as a villain with his motto "Rangu Paduddi"
- Mallikarjuna Rao as the wizard's assistant
- Chitti Babu as the wizard's assistant
- Ananth Babu as the wizard's assistant
- Subbaraya Sarma
- Chakrapani as Lord Krishna
- Giri Babu as Dharma Raju
- Prasad Babu as Duryodhana
- Vijaya Rangaraju as Bhima
- Jaggu as Alambusa
- Kishore Rathi as Indra
- Rituparna Sengupta as Princess in the song "Priya Madhuram"
- Sri Lakshmi as Brahmam's wife
- Sudha as Sudha, Chitti's mother
- Nagarjuna as himself (cameo appearance)
- Rajasekhar as Karna (cameo appearance)
- Srikanth as Arjuna (cameo appearance)

== Production ==
After the success of the fantasy film Yamaleela (1994), which featured comedian Ali in the lead role and Satyanarayana as Yama, director S. V. Krishna Reddy ventured into another fantasy film. For this project, he chose the character of Ghatotkacha from the Mahabharata. Krishna Reddy teamed up once again with producer K. Atchi Reddy, as well as with Satyanarayana and Ali. Satyanarayana was cast as Ghatotkacha, while Ali played one of the lead roles.

The film also featured the character Thota Ramudu from Yamaleela, with Tanikella Bharani reprising his role. Additionally, the film included cameo appearances by Rajasekhar and Srikanth as Karna and Arjuna, respectively, with Nagarjuna appearing in a special song.

== Music ==
Ghatothkachudu

Film score by S. V. Krishna Reddy
- Released: 1995
- Genre: Soundtrack
- Length: 28:50
- Label: Magna Sound
- Producer: S. V. Krishna Reddy

S. V. Krishna Reddy chronology
Number One (1994)	Ghatothkachudu (1995)	Top Hero (1995)

The music for the film was composed by the director, S. V. Krishna Reddy, himself.

Track list
No.	Title	Lyrics	Singer(s)	Length
1.	"Ja Ja Jja Roja"	Bhuvana Chandra	S. P. Balasubrahmanyam, Swarnalatha	5:15
2.	"Andala Aparanji Bomma"	Sirivennela Seetharama Sastry	S. P. Balasubrahmanyam	5:07
3.	"Bhamaro Nanne Pyar Karo"	Sirivennela Seetharama Sastry	S. P. Balasubrahmanyam, Swarnalatha	4:08
4.	"Bham Bham Bham"	Jonnavittula Ramalingeswara Rao	S. P. Balasubrahmanyam	4:08
5.	"Dingu Dingu"	Jonnavittula Ramalingeswara Rao	S. P. Balasubrahmanyam, K. S. Chithra	5:03
6.	"Priya Madhuram"	Jonnavittula Ramalingeswara Rao	Remo Fernandes, Swarnalatha	5:03
Total length:				28:46
