= Rajendrudu Gajendrudu =

- Film poster
- Directed by: S. V. Krishna Reddy
- Written by: Diwakar Babu (dialogues)
- Screenplay by: S. V. Krishna Reddy
- Story by: S. V. Krishna Reddy; K. Achi Reddy (Main Story)
- Produced by: K. Atchi Reddy; Kishore Rathi (Presents)
- Starring: Rajendra Prasad; Soundarya
- Cinematography: Sarath
- Edited by: K. Ramgopal Reddy
- Music by: S. V. Krishna Reddy
- Production company: Manisha Films
- Release date: 4 February 1993
- Running time: 152 mins
- Country: India
- Language: Telugu

Rajendrudu Gajendrudu is a 1993 Indian Telugu-language comedy film, produced by K. Achi Reddy under Manisha Films, presented by Kishore Rathi and directed by S. V. Krishna Reddy. The film stars Rajendra Prasad, Soundarya and music composed by S. V. Krishna Reddy. The film recorded as Blockbuster at the box office. The film was remade in Hindi as Jodidar, with Mithun Chakraborthy.

This is the story of an elephant taking revenge on killers of its past owner with the help of an unemployed man. The elephant was given a special training before the shooting started.

== Cast ==
- Rajendra Prasad as Rajendra
- Soundarya as Alaka
- Kota Srinivasa Rao as Kotlingam
- Brahmanandam as Bank Manager
- Babu Mohan as Seller
- Ali as Chata
- Mallikarjuna Rao as Murugan
- Gundu Hanumantha Rao as Gundu
- Gummadi as the Forest Officer who was Gajendra's former master
- Vidya Sagar as Poacher
- Ananth as Doctor
- Ironleg Sastri as Veterinary Doctor
- Gautam Raju as Astrologer
- Dham as Constable
- Narsing Yadav as Goon
- Sri Lakshmi as Kotlingam's wife
- Jayalalita as Ammadu
- Ratnasagar as the Bank Manager's wife
- Kalpana Rai

== Soundtrack ==
Rajendrudu Gajendrudu

Film score by S. V. Krishna Reddy
- Released: 1993
- Recorded: 1993
- Genre: Soundtrack
- Length: 20:32
- Label: AKASH Audio
- Producer: S. V. Krishna Reddy

S. V. Krishna Reddy chronology
Kobbari Bondam (1991)	Rajendrudu Gajendrudu (1993)	Mayalodu (1993)

All music is composed by S. V. Krishna Reddy.

Track-List
No.	Title	Lyrics	Singer(s)	Length
1.	"Deelaiko Vango" (A rehash of Harry Belafonte's Day -O)	Bhuvana Chandra	S. P. Balasubrahmanyam	4:36
2.	"Neeli Vennila"	Jonnavithhula Ramalingeswara Rao	S. P. Balasubrahmanyam, K. S. Chithra	4:43
3.	"Raajaya Namaha"	Bhuvana Chandra	S. P. Balasubrahmanyam	4:00
4.	"Kukoo Kukoo"	Bhuvana Chandra	S. P. Balasubrahmanyam, K. S. Chithra	4:38
5.	"Bommava Ammadu"	Sirivennela Seetharama Sastry	S. P. Balasubrahmanyam, K. S. Chithra	4:53
Total length:				23:50

== Legacy ==
Ali's Malayalam dialogue involving "Katravalli" and "Chaata" became popular.
