= Kobbari Bondam =

- VCD cover
- Directed by: Katragadda Raviteja
- Written by: Diwakar Babu (dialogues)
- Screenplay by: S. V. Krishna Reddy
- Story by: S. V. Krishna Reddy
- Produced by: K. Atchi Reddy; S. V. Krishna Reddy; Kishore Rathi (Presents)
- Starring: Rajendra Prasad; Nirosha
- Cinematography: M. Sudhakar Reddy
- Edited by: K. Ramgopal Reddy
- Music by: S. V. Krishna Reddy
- Production company: Manisha Films
- Release date: 1991
- Running time: 149 minutes
- Country: India
- Language: Telugu

Kobbari Bondam (transl. Coconut) is a 1991 Indian Telugu-language comedy film, produced by K. Achi Reddy, S. V. Krishna Reddy under Manisha Films, presented by Kishore Rathi and directed by Katragadda Raviteja. The film stars Rajendra Prasad, Nirosha, with music composed by S. V. Krishna Reddy. The film is the debut of S. V. Krishna Reddy, to which he has provided the story, screenplay, music in addition to supervising the direction. The first film he has completely directed is Rajendrudu Gajendrudu.

== Cast ==
- Rajendra Prasad as Raju
- Nirosha as Meghamala
- Kota Srinivasa Rao as Sarvanamam
- Sudhakar as Satish
- Manto as Kapoor
- Mallikarjuna Rao as Meghamala's brother
- Ramana Murthy as professor
- Gundu Hanumantha Rao as coconut seller
- Kallu Chidambaram as Spoon Man
- Gowtham Raju
- Narsing Yadav as Sarvanamam's goon
- Sri Lakshmi as Meghamala's sister-in-law
- Jayalalita as Janabettula Janamma
- Lakshmi Kanakala as Raju's mother
- Master Sairam as Babloo

== Soundtrack ==
Music composed by S. V. Krishna Reddy. Music released on LEO Audio Company.

No.	Title	Lyrics	Singer(s)	Length
1.	"Gangigovu"	Jonnavithhula	S. P. Balasubrahmanyam	4:13
2.	"Andala Meghamala"	Bhuvana Chandra	Chitra	2:53
3.	"Ko Ko Ko"	Bhuvana Chandra	S. P. Balasubrahmanyam, Chitra	4:31
4.	"Challa Challani"	Jonnavithhula	S. P. Balasubrahmanyam, Chitra	4:47
5.	"Jana Betthala"	Jonnavithhula	S. P. Balasubrahmanyam, Chitra	4:05
Total length:				20:29
