= Ugadi (disambiguation) =

Ugadi is the New Year's Day for the people of the Telugu and Kannada communities in India.

Ugadi may also refer to:

- Ugadi (1997 film), Telugu film directed by S. V. Krishna Reddy
- Ugadi (2007 film), Kannada film directed by Om Sai Prakash
