= Sivaji Raja =

Indian actor and comedian

- Born: 26 February 1962 (age 64); Bhimavaram, Andhra Pradesh, India
- Occupations: Actor, Producer
- Spouse: G. Aruna
- Children: 2

Sivaji Raja (born 26 February 1962) is an Indian actor who works in Telugu films and television shows. He appeared in more than 400 films. He is also known for his work in TV serials Amrutam, Alasyam Amrutham Visham, Mr.Romeo, Pandu Mirapakai, Papam Padmanabham and Moguds Pellams. He has won four Nandi award and a Santosham Film Award.

== Filmography ==
=== Films ===
| Year | Title | Role | Notes and Ref. |
|---|---|---|---|
| 1979 | Chaaya | | |
| 1987 | Maharshi | | |
| 1987 | Sankeertana | | |
| 1988 | Kallu | Rangadu | |
| 1989 | Ontari Poratam | | |
| 1990 | Bobbili Raja | | |
| 1990 | Neti Charitra | Edukondalu | |
| 1990 | Sahasa Putrudu | | |
| 1990 | Chinnari Muddula Papa | Sivaji | |
| 1990 | Idem Pellam Baboi | | |
| 1991 | Vidhata | Prathap | |
| 1991 | Ganga | | |
| 1991 | Jeevana Chadarangam | | |
| 1991 | Indra Bhavanam | | |
| 1992 | Pellam Chepithe Vinali | | |
| 1992 | Asadhyulu | | |
| 1993 | Evandi Aavida Vachindi | | |
| 1993 | Abbayigaru | | |
| 1993 | Joker | | |
| 1993 | Pekata Papa Rao | | |
| 1994 | Gharana Alludu | Errababu | |
| 1994 | Alludu Poru Ammayi Joru | Rajesh | |
| 1994 | Prema & Co. | | |
| 1994 | Bobbili Simham | | |
| 1994 | O Thandri O Koduku | | |
| 1994 | Number One | | |
| 1994 | Srivari Priyuralu | | |
| 1994 | Hello Brother | | |
| 1995 | Ghatotkachudu | | |
| 1995 | Telugu Veera Levara | Srinu | |
| 1995 | Ketu Duplicatu | | |
| 1995 | Madhya Taragati Maha Bharatnam | | |
| 1995 | Vajram | | |
| 1995 | Vaddu Bava Thappu | | |
| 1995 | Mounam | | |
| 1995 | Sisindri | | |
| 1996 | Pelli Sandadi | | |
| 1996 | Kuturu | | |
| 1996 | Vamsanikokkadu | | |
| 1996 | Gunshot | | |
| 1996 | Bombay Priyudu | | |
| 1996 | Adavi Dora | | |
| 1996 | Maavichiguru | | |
| 1996 | Pelli Sandadi | | |
| 1996 | Mummy Mee Aayanochadu | | |
| 1996 | Vinodam | | |
| 1997 | Aahvaanam | | |
| 1997 | Hello, I Love You | | |
| 1997 | Thoka Leni Pitta | | |
| 1997 | Nayanamma | | |
| 1997 | Egire Paavurama | | |
| 1997 | Priyamaina Srivaru | | |
| 1997 | Devudu | Bangaru Raju | |
| 1997 | Abbai Gari Pelli | | |
| 1997 | Priya O Priya | | |
| 1997 | Allari Pellikoduku | | |
| 1998 | Daddy Daddy | | |
| 1998 | Premante Idera | | |
| 1998 | Subbaraju Gari Kutumbam | | |
| 1998 | Pape Naa Pranam | Bose | |
| 1998 | Life Lo Wife | | |
| 1998 | Kalavari Chellelu Kanaka Mahalakshmi | | |
| 1998 | Abhishekam | | |
| 1998 | Kodukulu | | |
| 1998 | Allari Pellam | | |
| 1998 | Pelli Peetalu | | |
| 1999 | Anaganaga Oka Ammai | | |
| 1999 | Krishna Babu | | |
| 1999 | Samudram | | |
| 1999 | Vichitram | | |
| 1999 | Nee Kosam | | |
| 1999 | Raja Kumarudu | | |
| 2000 | Mee Aayana Jagratha | | |
| 2000 | Kodanda Ramudu | | |
| 2000 | Nuvvu Vastavani | | |
| 2000 | Sivanna | | |
| 2000 | Ninne Premistha | | |
| 2000 | Sardukupodaam Randi | | |
| 2000 | Sri Srimati Satyabhama | Ravi's friend | |
| 2001 | Pandanti Samsaram | | |
| 2001 | Murari | | |
| 2001 | Bhalevadivi Basu | | |
| 2001 | Chandu | | |
| 2001 | Prema Sandadi | | |
| 2001 | Narasimha Naidu | | |
| 2001 | Ninnu Choodalani | | |
| 2001 | Sampangi | | |
| 2002 | Nee Sneham | | |
| 2002 | Mounamelanoyi | | |
| 2002 | Sahasa Baludu Vichitra Kothi | Vamsi | |
| 2003 | Dhanush | Rambabu | |
| 2003 | Palanati Brahmanaidu | | |
| 2003 | Neeke Manasichaanu | Gangaraju | |
| 2003 | Ninne Istapaddanu | | |
| 2003 | Villain | | |
| 2004 | Anandamanandamaye | | |
| 2004 | Letha Manasulu | | |
| 2004 | No | | |
| 2004 | Varsham | | |
| 2004 | Puttintiki Ra Chelli | | |
| 2004 | Shankar Dada MBBS | | |
| 2005 | Keelu Gurram | Pinni | |
| 2005 | Youth | Velu | |
| 2005 | Kanchanamala Cable TV | | |
| 2005 | Kumkuma | | |
| 2005 | Okkade | | |
| 2005 | Pandem | | |
| 2005 | Moguds Pellams | | |
| 2005 | Seenugadu Chiranjeevi Fan | | |
| 2006 | Aadi Lakshmi | | |
| 2006 | Aithe | | |
| 2006 | Chinnodu | | |
| 2006 | Maayajaalam | | |
| 2006 | Manasistha Ra | | |
| 2006 | Manasundira | | |
| 2007 | 50 Lakh (Hindi) | | |
| 2007 | Aho Brahma Oho Shishya | | |
| 2007 | Viyyalavari Kayyalu | | |
| 2007 | Yamagola Malli Modalayindi | | |
| 2008 | Andamaina Abaddam | | |
| 2008 | Akhirat | | |
| 2008 | Brahmanandam Drama Company | | |
| 2008 | Kalidasu | | |
| 2008 | Hero | | |
| 2008 | Nagaram | | |
| 2009 | Sasirekha Parinayam | | |
| 2010 | Ranga The Donga | | |
| 2011 | Virodhi | | |
| 2012 | Devaraya | | |
| 2012 | Kalalukandam Ra | | |
| 2012 | Nandeeswarudu | | |
| 2013 | Sevakudu | | |
| 2013 | Chammak Challo | | |
| 2015 | Rudhramadevi | | Cameo appearance |
| 2015 | Soukhyam | | |
| 2016 | Raja Cheyyi Vesthe | | |
| 2017 | Nakshatram | | |
| 2017 | Nene Raju Nene Mantri | | |
| 2017 | Mental Madhilo | | |
| 2018 | Nartanasala | | |
| 2018 | Jai Simha | | |
| 2018 | MLA | | |
| 2018 | Ammammagarillu | | |
| 2018 | Nela Ticket | | |
| 2018 | Neevevaro | | |
| 2018 | Idam Jagath | | |
| 2019 | Brochevarevarura | | |
| 2019 | Suryakantham | | |
| 2021 | Adbhutham | Chandra Mohan | |
| 2021 | Arjuna Phalguna | | |
| 2022 | 10th Class Diaries | | |
| 2022 | Jetty | | |
| 2024 | Usha Parinayam | Honey’s father | |
| 2024 | Premalo | Satyanarayana | |
| 2025 | Hathya | | |
| 2025 | Oka Brundavanam | Damodhar | |
| 2025 | Karmanye Vadhikaraste | | |
| 2025 | Raju Weds Rambai | | |
| 2026 | Vanaveera | Raghu’s father | |

=== Television ===
| Year | Title | Network | Notes |
|---|---|---|---|
| 2001–2002 | Amrutham | Gemini TV | |
| | Srimathi Sri Subrahmanyam | ETV | |
| | Sambarala Rambabu | Gemini TV | |
| | Neelo Sagam | | |
| | Mr. Romeo | Zee Telugu | |
| | Moguds Pellams | | |
| | Pandu Mirapakai | | |
| | Papam Padmanabham | | |
| | Alasyam Amrutham Visham | | |
| 2018 | Nanna Koochi | ZEE5 | |
| 2026 | Panchanama | ZEE5 | |
