= Khel Khiladi Ka =

Khel Khiladi Ka may refer to the following:

- Khel Khilari Ka a 1977 Bollywood action film directed by Arjun Hingorani.
- Khel Khiladi Ka Hindi dubbed version of Super Police a 1994 Telugu film directed by K. Murali Mohan Rao and music by A. R. Rahman
