= Narsing Yadav =

Indian actor (1963–2020)

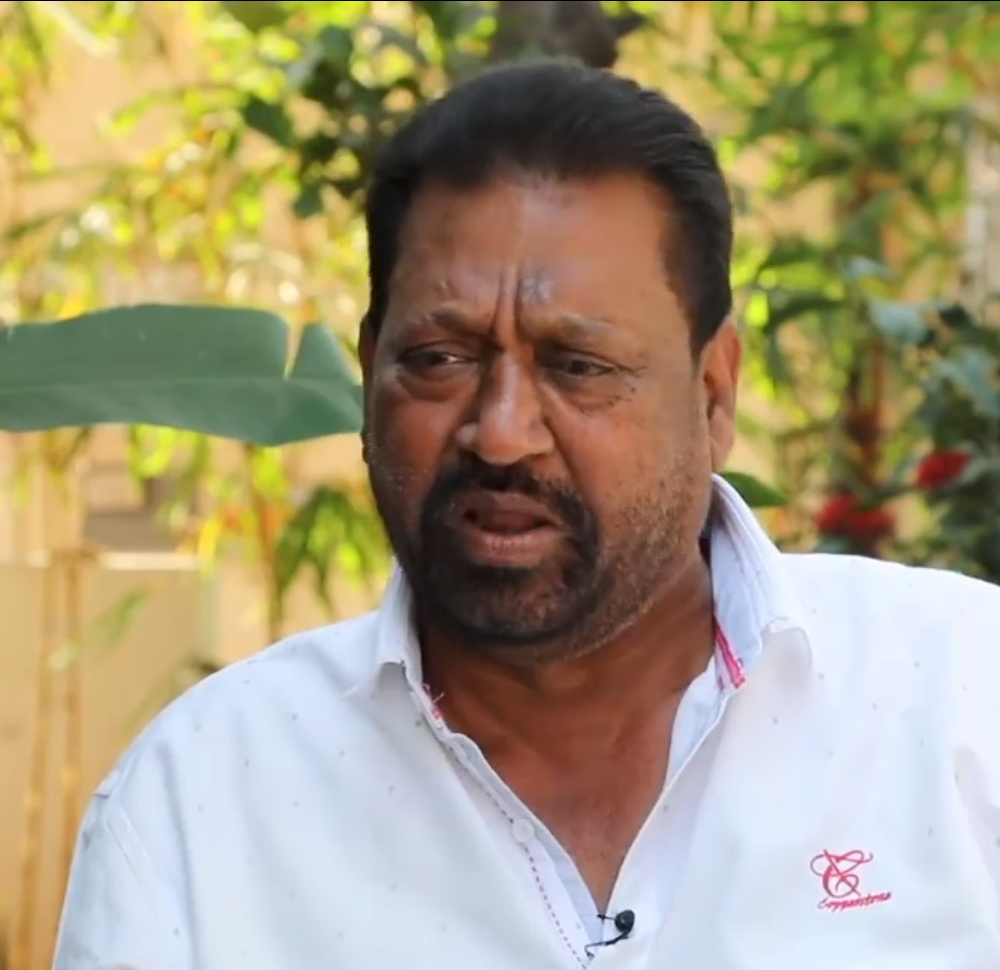
- Yadav in 2017
- Born: Maila Narasimha Yadav; 15 May 1963; Hyderabad, Andhra Pradesh (now in Telangana), India
- Died: 31 December 2020 (aged 57); Hyderabad, Telangana, India
- Other name: Narsing
- Notable work: Kshana Kshanam; Money; Money Money (2002); Tagore; Pokiri (2006)
- Spouse: Maila Chitra
- Children: 1

Narsing Yadav (15 May 1963 – 31 December 2020) was an Indian actor known for his comic villain roles. He acted in more than 300 films, predominantly in Telugu, in addition to Tamil, Hindi and Kannada languages. He debuted as a character artist working in minor roles and was primarily cast as a villain and comedy actor. He died on 31 December 2020 from kidney-related ailments.

== Personal life ==
Narsing was born in Hyderabad to Rajaiah and Lakshmi Narasamma. He completed his primary education in Raja Kandaswamy School. His highest qualification was Intermediate (Plus 2). He was married to Chitra Yadav and had a son named Ruthvik Yadav.

== Filmography ==
Narsing played notable roles in Kshana Kshanam, Gaayam, Mutha Mestri, Aithe, Mass, Shankar Dada M.B.B.S., Anukokunda Oka Roju and Nuvvostanante Nenoddantana.

Narsing was considered a "permanent" actor in Ram Gopal Varma's films.

=== Telugu ===
1. Hema Hemmelu (1979)
2. Vande Mataram (1985)
3. Gandhipeta Rahasyam (1989)
4. Balachandrudu (1990)
5. Stuvartpuram Dongalu (1991)
6. Kshana Kshanam (1991) as Narsing
7. Kobbari Bondam (1991)
8. Vidhata (1991) as Siva Reddy
9. Killer (1992) as Head of Security
10. Lathi (1992) as Goon
11. President Gari Pellam (1992)
12. Mutha Mestri (1993)
13. Anna Chellelu (1993)
14. Nakshatra Poratam (1993)
15. Mayalodu (1993) as Goon
16. Gaayam (1993) as Narsing
17. Sabash Ramu (1993)
18. Rajendrudu Gajendrudu (1993) as Goon
19. Kondapalli Raja (1993)
20. Allari Premikudu (1994) as Kidnapper
21. Kishkindha Kanda (1994)
22. Hello Brother (1994)
23. Money Money (1994)
24. Telugu Veera Levara (1995) as Tiger's henchman
25. Alibaba Adbhuta Deepam (1995) as Mr. India, Indu's brother
26. Khaidi Inspector (1995)
27. Desa Drohulu (1995)
28. Adavi Dora (1995)
29. Dear Brother (1995)
30. Chilakkottudu (1997)
31. Priyamaina Srivaru (1997)
32. Super Heroes (1997)
33. Anaganaga Oka Roju (1997)
34. Master (1997)
35. Ganesh (1998)
36. Sreevarante Maavare (1998)
37. Yuvarathna Rana (1998)
38. Chandralekha (1998) as Financer
39. O Panaipothundi Babu (1998)
40. Prema Kosam (1999)
41. Bharata Ratna (1999)
42. Preminche Manasu (1999)
43. Badri (2000)
44. Bachi (2000)
45. Okkadu Chalu (2000) as Dhanraj's henchman
46. Family Circus (2001)
47. Hyderabad (2001) as Narsing
48. Valayam (2002) as Politician
49. Idiot (2002) as Gangster and politician
50. Sreeram (2002)
51. Adrustam (2002)
52. Ninu Choodaka Nenundalenu (2002)
53. Aithe (2003) as Minister
54. Johnny (2003)
55. Simhachalam (2003) as Narsing Yadav
56. Tagore (2003)
57. Satyam (2003) as MLA
58. Varsham (2004) as Bus driver
59. Sye (2004)
60. Shankar Dada M.B.B.S. (2004)
61. Mass (2004)
62. Adavi Ramudu (2004)
63. Madhyanam Hathya (2004)
64. Letha Manasulu (2004)
65. Andaru Dongale Dorikite (2004)
66. Nuvvostanante Nenoddantana (2005) as Narasimha
67. Anukokunda Oka Roju (2005) as Machavarapu Abbulu
68. Nayakudu (2005)
69. Seenugadu Chiranjeevi Fan (2005)
70. Hungama (2005)
71. Athanokkade (2005)
72. Narasimhudu (2005)
73. Pournami (2006) as Servant
74. Pokiri (2006) as Dasanna
75. Valliddari Vayasu Padahare (2006) as Satti Reddy
76. Roommates (2006)
77. Nuvve (2006)
78. Paisalo Parmathma (2006)
79. Amma Cheppindi (2006)
80. Annavaram (2006)
81. Sainikudu (2006)
82. Tulasi (2007)
83. 4 Boys (2007)
84. Poramboku (2007)
85. Desamuduru (2007)
86. Aata (2007)
87. Gundamma Gaari Manavadu (2007)
88. Allare Allari (2007)
89. Jagadam (2007)
90. Yamadonga (2007) as Yamakinkarudu
91. Viyyalavari Kayyalu (2007)
92. Takkari (2007)
93. Vishaka Express (2008)
94. Vaana (2008)
95. Aatadista (2008)
96. Sangamam (2008)
97. Hero (2008)
98. Baladur (2008)
99. Raksha (2008) as Shyam
100. Rainbow (2008)
101. Kuberulu (2008)
102. King (2008)
103. Current (2009)
104. Siddham (2009)
105. Kick (2009)
106. Gopi Gopika Godavari (2009)
107. Seetharamula Kalyanam (2010)
108. Darling (2010)
109. Saradaga Kasepu (2010)
110. Leader (2010)
111. Baava (2010)
112. Ragada (2010)
113. Mirapakaay (2011)
114. Vastadu Naa Raju (2011)
115. Katha Screenplay Darshakatvam Appalaraju (2011) as Daivagna Chari
116. Pilla Zamindar (2011) as Adavi Rambabu
117. Daruvu (2012) as Cowardy Gunda
118. Sudigadu (2012)
119. Potugadu (2013)
120. 1: Nenokkadine (2014)
121. Race Gurram (2014)
122. Pataas (2015)
123. Subramanyam For Sale (2015) as Narsing
124. Dongaata (2015) as Baapji
125. Temper (2015)
126. Attack (2016)
127. Khaidi No. 150 (2017)

=== Tamil ===
1. Baashha (1995)
2. Kuruvi (2008)
3. Laadam (2009)
4. Aatanayagan (2010)
5. Rajapattai (2011)
6. Poojai (2014)

=== Hindi ===
1. Naukar Biwi Ka (1983) .... Crowd scene - extra waiting outside studio
2. Prem Qaidi (1991) as Driver
3. Daud: Fun on the Run (1997) as Inspector Rana
4. Shart: The Challenge (2004)
5. 50 Lakh (2007)

=== Kannada ===
1. Satya in Love (2008)
2. Vayuputra (2009)
3. Aa Marma (2012)
