= Ravikula Raghurama =

- Directed by: Chandrasekhar Kanuri
- Starring: Gowtham Varma; Deepshika Uma Pati
- Cinematography: Murali
- Music by: Sukumar Pammis
- Production company: Positive Vibes Productions
- Release date: 15 March 2024
- Running time: 111 minutes
- Country: India
- Language: Telugu

Ravikula Raghurama is a 2024 Indian Telugu language romantic drama film directed by Chandrasekhar Kanuri and starring Gowtham Varma and Deepshika. The music was composed by Sukumar Pammis.

== Plot ==
This love story follows Gowtham and Nisha, whose contrasting personalities bring them together. Nisha, initially skeptical about genuine love, deceives Gowtham but later realizes her deep yearning for him after a chance accident. The loss of her grandmother enlightens her about the value of love. Ultimately, Nisha defies expectations as she returns to Gowtham, confessing her feelings.

== Cast ==
- Gowtham Varma as Gowtham
- Deepshika Uma Pati as Nisha
- Pramodini Pammi as Gowtham's mother
- Sri Lakshmi as Nisha's grandmother
- Satya

== Soundtrack ==
Ravikula Raghurama

Soundtrack album by Sukumar Pammi
- Released: 2024
- Recorded: 2023–2024
- Genre: Feature film soundtrack
- Language: Telugu
- Label: Tips Industries
- Producer: Sukumar Pammi

All music is composed by Sukumar Pammi.

Tracklist
No.	Title	Lyrics	Singer(s)	Length
1.	"Maikame "	Sreemani	Vijay Prakash	4:10
2.	"Madhurame"	Sreemani	Armaan Malik	3:19
3.	"Chandamame"	Sreemani	Yazin Nizar, Sameera Bharadwaj	3:45

== Reception ==
The film is "a testament to the enduring power of love, offering a heartfelt journey filled with laughter, tears, and hope" according to a review in Times Now News. A critic from The Hans India rated the film 2 3/4 out of 5 and wrote that the film "stands out as a poignant portrayal of modern-day romance, exploring themes of love, sacrifice, and redemption. Director Chandrasekhar Kanuri's adept direction, coupled with stellar performances by the cast, ensures a captivating cinematic experience".
