= Youth (2005 film) =

Indian Telugu-language romantic drama film

- Title card
- Directed by: J. Jitendra
- Written by: J. Jitendra
- Produced by: Gogikar Bajarang Jayadev
- Starring: Vikram; Sri Harsha; Lahari; Sishwa
- Cinematography: Ramana Salwa
- Edited by: Menaga
- Music by: Ramana Ogeti
- Production company: Sri Siva Kesava (SSK) Films
- Release date: 4 March 2005
- Country: India
- Language: Telugu

Youth is a 2005 Indian Telugu-language romantic drama film directed by J. Jitendra and starring Vikram, Sri Harsha, Lahari, and Sishwa.

== Plot ==
The film follows the lives of college students Babu, Ganesh and his friends. The film also follows Ganesh as he falls in love with Sathya and Babu with another woman.

== Cast ==
- Vikram as Babu
- Sri Harsha as Ganesh
- Lahari as Sathya
- Sishwa as Babu's girlfriend
- Nutan Prasad as Babu's father
- Babu Mohan as Velu's father (college lecturer)
- Tanikella Bharani as priest
- M. S. Narayana
- Sivaji Raja as Velu
- Surya
- Sri Lakshmi as Velu's mother
- Y. Vijaya
- Jayalalita as Newly joined lecturer
- Ramya Sri as an item number in "Pori Choodaro"
- Siva Reddy as Arjun (uncredited)
- Vijay Sai as Babu's friend (uncredited)

== Production ==
According to producer Gogikar Bajarang Jayadev, the film "has a neat and simple story line that if the family prospers, the nation as a whole will prosper". Despite having a busy schedule after becoming a popular actor, Vikram still allotted dates for the film to help complete it.

== Soundtrack ==
Youth

Soundtrack album by Ramana Ogeti
- Released: 2005
- Genre: Feature film soundtrack
- Language: Telugu

Video Jukebox
- Youth – Jukebox on YouTube

The soundtrack was composed by Ramana Ogeti.

Track listing
No.	Title	Length
1.	"Teenage"
2.	"Pori Choodaro"
3.	"Ekkindammo Kikku"
4.	"Koti Centarlo"
5.	"Ee Vasantha Velalo"

== Release ==
The delay of the film meant that it was released after Jitendra passed away and was released in between a slew of Vikram's successful films. The film was dedicated in the director's honor. The film's low-key nature meant that its release went unnoticed at the box office.
