= Nandi Award for Best Male Comedian =

Indian film award

The Nandi Award for Best Male Comedian was first given in 1985. Brahmanandam and M. S. Narayana have each won the award five times, and Suthi Velu has won it thrice.

== List ==
Year	Male Comedian	Film
1985	Suthi Velu	Devalayam
1986	Rallapalli	Patnam Pilla Palletoori Chinnodu
1987	Chandra Mohan	Chandamama Raave
1988	Rallapalli	Jeevana Jyothi
1989	Suthi Velu	Geethanjali
1990	Suthi Velu	Master Kapuram
1991	Babu Mohan	Mamagaru
1992	Sudhakar	Peddarikam
1993	Brahmanandam	Money
1994	AVS	Subha Lagnam
1995	Brahmanandam	Anaganaga Oka Roju
1996	Brahmanandam	Vinodam
1997	M. S. Narayana	Maa Nannaki Pelli
1998	Sudhakar	Snehitulu
1999	M. S. Narayana	Ramasakkanodu
2000	L.B. Sriram & M. S. Narayana	Chala Bagundi & Sardukupodaam Randi
2001	Sunil	Nuvvu Nenu
2002	Suman Setty	Jayam
2003	M. S. Narayana	Sivamani
2004	Dharmavarapu Subramanyam	Yagnam
2005	Sunil	Andhrudu
2006	Venu Madhav	Lakshmi
2007	Uttej	Chandamama
2008	Bramhanandam	Ready
2009	Vennela Kishore	Inkosaari
2010	Dharmavarapu Subramanyam	Aalasyam Amrutam
2011	M. S. Narayana	Dookudu
2012	Raghu Babu	Onamalu
2013	Thagubothu Ramesh	Venkatadri Express
2014	Brahmanandam	Race Gurram
2015	Vennela Kishore	Bhale Bhale Magadivoy
2016	Saptagiri	Express Raja

=== Most won ===
Winner with most wins
Artist	Wins
Brahmanandam	5
M. S. Narayana	5
Suthi Velu	3
Sudhakar	2
Dharmavarapu Subramanyam	2
Vennela Kishore	2
