= Gunshot (film) =

- Directed by: S. V. Krishna Reddy
- Screenplay by: S. V. Krishna Reddy
- Produced by: K. Achi Reddy
- Starring: Ali; Prakash Raj
- Cinematography: Sarath
- Edited by: K. Ramgopal Reddy
- Music by: S. V. Krishna Reddy
- Production company: Manisha Films
- Release date: November 1996
- Country: India
- Language: Telugu

Gunshot is 1996 Telugu-language mystery film directed by S. V. Krishna Reddy starring Ali, Prakash Raj and Keerthi Reddy. It was Keerthi Reddy's debut film. The film won two Nandi Awards. The film was not commercially successful.

== Plot ==
The film opens with a murder and the police investigating it. Rambabu is a delivery agent, who works in a supermarket owned by Tanikella Bharani. Rambabu meets Keerthi Reddy, when she escapes from some goons and stays at his home.

Prakash is a mentally ill patient who is on killing spree, all of them end up on a highway. Plot entails comedy instances between the main characters and how Rambabu saves himself from Prakash by killing him in the climax.

== Cast ==
- Ali as Rambabu
- Prakash Raj as Prakash
- Keerthi Reddy
- Babu Mohan
- Tanikella Bharani
- Kota Srinivasa Rao
- Brahmanandam
- Sivaji Raja
- Rallapalli
- A. V. S.
- Subbaraya Sharma
- Gundu Hanumantha Rao
- Prasad Babu
- Jenny
- K. K. Sharma
- Madhurima Narla
- Kishore Rathi

== Reception ==
A critic from Andhra Today opined that "Director S.V.Krishna Reddy seems to be sailing successfully from phantasm via melodrama to buffoonery".

== Awards ==
Nandi Awards

- Best Villain - Prakash Raj
- Best Editor - K. Ram Gopal Reddy
