= Sakutumba Saparivaara Sametam =

- DVD Cover
- Directed by: S. V. Krishna Reddy
- Written by: Satyamurthy (dialogues)
- Screenplay by: S. V. Krishna Reddy
- Story by: S. V. Krishna Reddy; Vallabhaneni Janardhan
- Produced by: V. M. D. Reddy; M. Mohan Gandhi Reddy
- Starring: Akkineni Nageswara Rao; Srikanth; Jayalakshmi; Suhasini Maniratnam; Ravi Teja
- Cinematography: Sarath
- Edited by: V. Nagi Reddy
- Music by: S. V. Krishna Reddy
- Production company: Sai Charan Productions
- Release date: 21 December 2000
- Running time: 148 mins
- Country: India
- Language: Telugu

Sakutumba Saparivaara Sametam (transl. Whole family together) is a 2000 Telugu-language drama film directed by S. V. Krishna Reddy. It stars Akkineni Nageswara Rao, Srikanth, Jayalakshmi, Ravi Teja, and Suhasini Maniratnam. The music was composed by S. V. Krishna Reddy.

== Cast ==
- Akkineni Nageswara Rao as Janakiramayya
- Srikanth as Vamsi
- Jayalakshmi as Vasanti
- Suhasini Maniratnam as Vaani
- Ravi Teja as Ravi, Vamsi's friend
- Kota Srinivasa Rao as Srinivasa Rao
- Brahmanandam as Vamsi's brother-in-law
- Babu Mohan as Villager
- M. S. Narayana as Vamsi's brother-in-law father
- L. B. Sriram as Veeraraju
- Mallikarjuna Rao as Bank Manager
- Maharshi Raghava as Vamsi's brother
- Rajitha as Vamsi's sister
- Priya as Janakiramayya's daughter
- Kalpana Rai
- Y. Vijaya as Vamsi's mother

== Soundtrack ==
Sakutumba Saparivaara Sametam

Soundtrack album by S. V. Krishna Reddy
- Released: 2000
- Genre: Soundtrack
- Length: 25:47
- Label: His Master's Voice
- Producer: S. V. Krishna Reddy

S. V. Krishna Reddy chronology
Sardukupodaam Randi (2000)	Sakutumba Saparivaara Sametam (2000)	Budget Padmanabham (2001)

Music was composed by S. V. Krishna Reddy. Lyrics were written by Suddala Ashok Teja. Music was released on His Master's Voice.

No.	Title	Singer(s)	Length
1.	"Puttinti Tulasiga"	S. P. Balasubrahmanyam, Chitra	5:21
2.	"Love is the Feeling"	Hariharan, Harini	4:32
3.	"Pachi Venna Techi"	Udit Narayan, Mahalakshmi Iyer	4:47
4.	"Ollanta Tullinta"	S. P. Balasubrahmanyam, Chitra	5:12
5.	"Manasanta Manasupadi"	S. P. Balasubrahmanyam, Chitra	4:55
6.	"Manasunu Kanuka Chesi"	Sudharani	1:00
7.	"Andachandala chandamama"	S. P. Balasubrahmanyam, Chitra	5:39
Total length:			25:47

== Reception ==
A critic from Sify wrote, "It`s a typical S.V. Krishna Reddy`s family entertainer emphasising that love and affection among family members is more crucial than money. Srikanth wins the sympathy of the viewers as the son craving for love despite being pitted against artistes of calibre like ANR and Suhasini Maniratnam. The theme of happiness in `unity` comes across but both the new girl Jayalaxmi and SVK`s music are disappointing". Indiainfo wrote "After one watches the movie, one feels that A.N.R and Suhasini's talent has been wasted. S.V.Krishna Reddy proves that he is jack of all and master of none. Though his music is good but picturisation of songs is bad".

== Awards ==
Nandi Awards - 2000

- Best Director — S. V. Krishna Reddy
- Best Home Viewing Feature Film - M. Mohan Gandhi Reddy
