= Konkuduru =

- Village
- Interactive map of Konkuduru
- Location in Andhra Pradesh, India
- Coordinates: 16.911980°N 82.033905°E
- Country: India
- State: Andhra Pradesh
- District: East Godavari

Government
  - Body: konkuduru Grama Panchayati

Area
  - Total: 8 km^{2} (3.1 sq mi)
- Elevation 24: 8 m (26 ft)

Population (2011)
  - Total: 6,987
  - Rank: 4
  - Density: 870/km^{2} (2,300/sq mi)

Languages
  - Official: Telugu
- Time zone: UTC+5:30 (IST)
- Postal code: 533345
- Vehicle registration: AP39 previously AP05
- Nearest city: Kakinada (27 km), Rajahmundry (37 km)

Konkuduru is a village in the East Godavari district of Andhra Pradesh, India, located on the banks of Tulyabhaga River, which is a tributary of the Godavari River. The Telugu movie director S. V. Krishna Reddy was born in Konkuduru.
