= Deergha Sumangali Bhava =

- దీర్ఘసుమంగళీభవ
- Directed by: S. V. Krishna Reddy
- Written by: Diwakar Babu (dialogues)
- Screenplay by: S. V. Krishna Reddy
- Story by: S. V. Krishna Reddy
- Produced by: K. Achi Reddy; Usha Rani
- Starring: Rajasekhar; Ramyakrishna
- Cinematography: Sarath
- Edited by: K. Ramgopal Reddy
- Music by: S. V. Krishna Reddy
- Production company: Manisha Films
- Release date: 28 December 1998
- Country: India
- Language: Telugu

Deergha Sumangali Bhava is a 1998 Telugu-language drama film directed by S. V. Krishna Reddy starring Rajasekhar and Ramyakrishna. This is the story of a married woman who dumps her husband for her career in the glamour world, and later realized that she has lost her good old life. S. V. Krishna Reddy prepared this story based on a letter received by him.

== Plot ==
Vani (Ramya Krishna) is the only daughter of a school Headmaster Satyanarayana a.k.a. Satyam (Dasari Narayana Rao). He brings her up with discipline. His family and friends jokingly call him James Bond because of his steadfast behavior. Ramarao (Rajasekhar) works in an office owned by S. P. Balasubrahmanyam, who is also a close friend of Satyam.

Vani always dreams of living a rich life though her father advocates a simple life. One day, she happens to see Ramarao in his boss's car when he goes to a bank to withdraw money. Another time she finds him in a jewellery shop on behalf his boss again. She thinks that he might be a rich person and falls in love with him. Meanwhile, S. P. B thinks that Ramarao would be a good match for Vani and inquires about his habits on behalf of Satyam. Later he reveals it to Satyam, to which he gladly accepts. Vani is also happy that she is marrying the one she loved. After the marriage, she realizes that Ramarao is just a normal employee, but she somehow satisfied with married life and gives birth to a baby boy.

Later she will accidentally meet her old college friend who works as an organizer for films. He advises her to leave her family life and come with him so that she can gain the name and fame which she used to dream before marriage. Vani leaves the house without the notice of her family thinking that they might obstruct her. This incident brings her family suffer a lot in the society.

However Ramarao tries to bring her back but it is in vain. Later Ramarao remarries Sita due to the compulsion of Vani's parents and start a normal life again. During the course of time Vani loses her fame due to new comers in the industry. Due to lack of work and feeling lonely Vani tries to go back but finds that her presence is not needed for her family.

Finally realizing her lost days she attempts for suicide. Feeling that none should get as of her she writes a letter to a film director regarding her life and meets her husband to say sorry and dies in his hands. The film ends on reaching the letter to the director.

== Cast ==
- Rajasekhar as Rama Rao
- Ramya Krishna as Vani
- Prema as Seetha
- Dasari Narayana Rao as Satyanarayana
- S. P. Balasubrahmanyam as Satyanarayana's friend
- Prithivee as Prakash
- Kota Srinivasa Rao as Kotaiah
- Brahmanandam as Kotaiah's son
- A. V. S. as Devudu
- Ali
- M. S. Narayana as Kotaiah's servant
- Annapoorna as Vani's mother
- Subbaraya Sharma
- Siva Parvati
- Sana as Vani's friend

== Soundtrack ==
All music is composed by S. V. Krishna Reddy

Track list
No.	Title	Lyrics	Singer(s)	Length
1.	"Taaja Taaja"	Chandrabose	S. P. Balasubrahmanyam, K. S. Chithra	4:40
2.	"Navvulu Puvvulu"	Chandrabose	S. P. Balasubrahmanyam, K. S. Chithra	4:51
3.	"Nidura Po Nidura Po"	Chandrabose	S. P. Balasubrahmanyam	4:43
4.	"Maa Nanna Jamesbond"	Chandrabose	Soumya	4:09
5.	"Silver Jubliee"	Chandrabose	Naveen, Soumya	5:15
6.	"Pandiri Mancham"	Sirivennela Seetharama Sastry	S. P. Balasubrahmanyam, K. S. Chithra	4:51
Total length:				28:31
