= Ugadi (1997 film) =

- DVD cover
- Directed by: S. V. Krishna Reddy
- Written by: Diwakar Babu
- Produced by: K. Achi Reddy
- Starring: S. V. Krishna Reddy; Laila
- Music by: S. V. Krishna Reddy
- Production company: Manisha Films
- Release date: 10 November 1997
- Country: India
- Language: Telugu

Ugadi is a 1997 Telugu romantic film directed by S. V. Krishna Reddy starring himself and Laila in the lead roles.

This film is about a middle class young man winning his lady love despite opposition from the girl's father. Although the film was a box office failure, the music for the film was well received.

== Cast ==
- S. V. Krishna Reddy as Raju
- Laila as Laila
- Sharat Saxena as Laila's father
- Kaikala Satyanarayana as Laila's grandfather
- Sudhakar as Bose
- Tanikella Bharani
- Mallikarjuna Rao
- Annapoorna
- Babu Mohan
- Gautam Raju
- Bandla Ganesh
- Sivaji Raja as Raju
- Alapati Lakshmi
- Jayalalitha
- Sri Lakshmi

== Production ==
A song was shot at Kulu Manali.

== Soundtrack ==
All music is composed by S. V. Krishna Reddy.

Track list
No.	Title	Lyrics	Singer(s)	Length
1.	"Preyasi Naave"	Chandrabose	Unnikrishnan, K. S. Chithra	4:17
2.	"Choosa Oka Maru"	Bhuvana Chandra	Unnikrishnan, Sunitha	4:05
3.	"Innallu Yemabbullo"	Sirivennela Sitaramasastri	Unnikrishnan	3:57
4.	"Kaatuka Pittala"	Sirivennela Sitaramasastri	Chorus	1:55
5.	"Daddy Katha Vinava"	Sirivennela Sitaramasastri	Unnikrishnan, Sunitha	4:16
6.	"Yenthanga Undho"	Sirivennela Sitaramasastri	Unnikrishnan, Sunitha	3:30
7.	"Naa Pate Hoyina"	Chandrabose	Unnikrishnan, Prasanna Kumar	4:19
8.	"Brathukaina"	Bhuvana Chandra	Mano	2:33
9.	"Magic Of The Music"	Bhuvana Chandra	S. V. Krishna Reddy, Sunitha	5:36
Total length:				34:33

== Reception ==
A critic from Zamin Ryot wrote, "In his eagerness to direct himself by focusing on the role of the hero he plays, Krishna Reddy complains that he was unable to focus on other characters, the story and the scenes". A critic from Andhra Today noted, "The wishy- washy story and the lackluster performance of the hero disappoints the high expectations of the audience".
