= Lekshmi Krishnamoorthy =

Actress in Malayalam films

Lakshmi Krishnamurthy (1927/28 – 10 November 2018) was a character actress in Malayalam films. She is known for her role in 1996 Manju warrior starrer film Ee puzhayum kadannu.

== Life ==
Her first film was Hariharans Panchagni, in 1986. Later she acted in Malayalam films like Anantha Bhadram, Kaliyoonjal, Ponthan Mada, Pattabhishekham, Vismaya Thumbathu, Piravi, Thooval Kottaram, Vasthuhara, Vismayam, and Mallu Singh. She also acted in Kannada movie Sanskara, Maniratnams Tamil movie Kannathil Muthamittal, and Santhosh Sivan's Hindi movie Before the Rains.

She was a news reader (first Malayalam News Reader) and dubbing artist at Akashavani Kozhikode. She also acted in a few television serials.

She died on 10 November 2018.

== Filmography ==
- Panjagni (1986) - Debut film in Malayalam
- Thaniyavarthanam (1987)
- Piravi (1989)
- Aksharam (1990) - Short
- Vasthuhara (1991)
- Ponthanmada (1994)
- Sagaram Sakshi (1994)
- Vishnu (1994)
- Sakshyam (1995)
- Ee Puzhayum Kadannu (1996)
- Udhyanapalakan (1996)
- Thoovalkottaram (1996)
- Kaliyoonjal (1997)
- Vismayam (1998)
- Ilamura Thampuran (1998)
- Aaram Jaalakam (2001)
- Kakke Kakke Koodevide (2002)
- Kannathil Muthamittal (2002) - (Tamil)
- Chithrakoodam (2003)
- Kathavasheshan (2004)
- Vismayathumbathu (2004)
- Maanikyan (2005)
- Ananthabhadram (2005)
- Before the Rains (2007) - (English)
- Before the Rains (2008) - (Malayalam)
- Anthiponvettam (2008)
- Keshu (2009)
- Mallu Singh (2012)

== Dubbing credits ==
- Amma (1952) for B. S. Saroja

== TV serials ==
- Naalukettu
- Manasi
- Aalippazham
- Pennurimai
