= Apparao Driving School =

- DVD Cover
- Directed by: Anji Seenu
- Written by: Gangotri Viswanath (story / dialogues)
- Screenplay by: Anji Seenu
- Produced by: Devireddy Srikar Reddy
- Starring: Rajendra Prasad; Preeti Jhangiani; Malavika
- Cinematography: Vijay C Kumar
- Edited by: K. V. Krishna Reddy
- Music by: Ghantadi Krishna
- Production company: Jagadish Cine Makers
- Release date: 4 November 2004
- Running time: 145 mins
- Country: India
- Language: Telugu

Apparao Driving School is a 2004 Telugu-language comedy film, produced by Devireddy Srikar Reddy on Jagadish Cine Makers banner and directed by Anji Seenu. Starring Rajendra Prasad, Preeti Jhangiani, Malavika and music composed by Ghantadi Krishna. The film recorded as a flop at box office.

== Cast ==
- Rajendra Prasad as Appa Rao
- Preeti Jhangiani as Anjali
- Malavika as Mahalakshmi
- Suman as Dr. Chandra Shekar
- Jaya Prakash Reddy as Veera Raghava Reddy
- Brahmanandam as Losugula Lakshma Reddy
- Chalapathi Rao as Lakshmi's father
- Jeeva as Aliff Khan
- Raghu Babu as Appa Rao's lawyer
- Banerjee as SI
- Gundu Hanumantha Rao as Gundu
- M. S. Narayana as Nellore Pedda Reddy
- Kondavalasa
- Duvvasi Mohan as Khan's assistant
- Sarika Ramachandra Rao as Veera Raghava Reddy's acholyte
- Naveen as Mechanic Ramu
- Annapurna as Apparao's grand mother
- Kavitha as Lakshmi's mother
- Karate Kalyani as Khan's lawyer
- Sirisha as Geeta
- Apoorva as Khan's sweetheart

== Soundtrack ==
Apparao Driving School

Film score by Ghantadi Krishna
- Released: 2004
- Genre: Soundtrack
- Length: 30:53
- Label: Maruthi Music
- Producer: Ghantadi Krishna

Music composed by Ghantadi Krishna. Music released on Maruthi Music Company.

No.	Title	Lyrics	Singer(s)	Length
1.	"Apparao Driving School"	Surendra Krishna	Ghantadi Krishna, Viswa	4:02
2.	"Andala Palapitaro"	Bharathi Babu	Simha, Sunanda, Teena	4:13
3.	"Ninnu Chuse Velanona"	Veturi	Kumar Sanu, Sunitha	4:52
4.	"Gaalilona Eedukona"	Jaya Surya	Tina Kamal	4:28
5.	"Chirugaali Paata"	Uma Maheswara Rao	K. J. Yesudas	5:08
6.	"Nee Kattu Bottu"	Chaitanya Prasad	Ravi Varma, Malathi	3:42
7.	"Naa Pranam"	Tina Kamal	Ghantadi Krishna	4:28
Total length:				30:53

== Others ==
- VCDs and DVDs on - VOLGA Videos, Hyderabad
