= Mummy Mee Aayanochadu =

- Movie Poster
- Directed by: K. Ajay Kumar
- Written by: Madhukuri Raja (dialogues)
- Screenplay by: K. Ajay Kumar
- Story by: Yeerasheety Sai; Satya Murthy
- Produced by: B. Vanaja; C. Kalyan (Presents)
- Starring: Rajendra Prasad; Indraja; Keerthana
- Cinematography: Lok Singh
- Edited by: K. Ramesh
- Music by: Vidyasagar
- Production company: Sri Ammulya Art Productions
- Release date: 26 January 1996
- Running time: 128 mins
- Country: India
- Language: Telugu

Mummy Mee Aayanochadu (transl. Mother, your husband has arrived) is a 1996 Indian Telugu-language comedy film, produced by B. Vanaja, C. Kalyan under the Sri Ammulya Art Productions banner and directed by K. Ajay Kumar. It stars Rajendra Prasad, Indraja, Keerthana and music composed by Vidyasagar. The film was recorded as a flop at the box office.

== Cast ==
- Rajendra Prasad as Satish
- Indraja as Sarada
- Keerthana as Sangeeta
- Kota Srinivasa Rao as Anand Rao
- Brahmanandam as Potti Rayudu / Basha / Big Boss / Khan Dada / Prabhu Deva
- Tanikella Bharani as Inspector Extra Venkat Rao
- A.V.S. as Achary
- Sivaji Raja
- Gundu Hanumantha Rao as Antharangam
- Chitti Babu as Ayano Chadu
- Kallu Chidambaram as Lawyer
- Manju Bhargavi as Vasundhara
- Latha Sri
- Y. Vijaya as Rajyalakshmi

== Soundtrack ==
Mummy Mee Aayanochadu

Film score
- Released: 1996
- Genre: Soundtrack
- Length: 21:30
- Label: Supreme Music
- Producer: Vidyasagar

chronology
Simha Garjana (1996)	Mummy Mee Aayanochadu (1996)	Ladies Doctor (1996)

Music composed by Vidyasagar. Music released on Supreme Music Company.

No.	Title	Lyrics	Singer(s)	Length
1.	"Dhintanana Vennela Chilaka"	Sahithi	Mano, Sindhu	4:10
2.	"Chali Gali Chengu Chatu"	Bhuvana Chandra	Mano, Chitra	4:29
3.	"Gampalo Kodenta"	Sirivennela Sitarama Sastry	Mano, Chitra	4:44
4.	"Maharani Manjulavani"	Sirivennela Sitarama Sastry	Mano, Sujatha	4:12
5.	"Hye Hye Madana"	Bhuvana Chandra	Mano, Chitra	3:55
Total length:				21:30
