= Hello...Yama! =

Indian Telugu-language comedy film

- DVD cover
- Directed by: Pavithran
- Screenplay by: Pavithran
- Story by: M S Ramesh
- Produced by: Balaraju Anekal
- Starring: Suresh; Kota Srinivasa Rao; Babu Mohan
- Edited by: K. Madhava
- Music by: Vandemataram Srinivas
- Production company: B.R. Enterprises
- Release date: 10 September 1999
- Country: India
- Language: Telugu

Hello...Yama! is a 1999 Indian Telugu-language comedy film directed by Pavithran and starring Suresh, Kota Srinivasa Rao and Babu Mohan. The film is a remake of the Kannada film of the same name (1998).

== Cast ==
- Suresh as Suri
- Kota Srinivasa Rao as Yama Dharma Raja
- Babu Mohan as Chitragupta
- Kavya
- Sruthi
- Indu
- Babloo Prithiveeraj
- Sudhakar as Subbi Setty Sudharaman
- Brahmanandam as SI Dharmapetam
- Gundu Hanumantha Rao as doctor
- Gautham Raju as Govindam
- Rallapalli as producer
- Ravi Babu as Ravi

== Production ==
The film marked the Telugu debut of Pavithran as director who previously worked in Tamil films and was his first film in comedy genre. R. Sarathkumar (who acted in director's previous directorials) and T. Subbarami Reddy were present at the film's muhurat at Annapoorna Studios.

== Soundtrack ==
The music was compoesd by Vandemataram Srinivas.

- "Jambalakadi Pamba"
- "Hotele Hotele Garam"
- "Kassu Missu Kassu"
- "Muddu Muchatlu Vachi"
- "Makarana Makarana"

== Reception ==
Sify wrote "Director Pavithran made a bad mess of degrading Yama and Chitragupta who pledge the golden `gadayudha` of Yama to fill their stomachs and also by making them sit beside beggars all in the name of comedy!"
