= Sardukupodaam Randi =

- DVD cover
- Directed by: S. V. Krishna Reddy
- Written by: Diwakar Babu (dialogues)
- Screenplay by: S. V. Krishna Reddy
- Story by: S. V. Krishna Reddy; Dhinraj (main story)
- Based on: Pelli Naati Pramanalu (1958)
- Produced by: Burugupalli Siva Ramakrishna
- Starring: Jagapati Babu; Soundarya
- Cinematography: Sarath
- Edited by: Nandamuri Hari
- Music by: S. V. Krishna Reddy
- Production company: Sri Venkateswara Art Films
- Release date: 23 April 2000
- Running time: 146 minutes
- Country: India
- Language: Telugu

Sardukupodaam Randi (transl. Come, Let's Get Adjusted) is a 2000 Indian Telugu-language comedy film produced by Burugupalli Siva Ramakrishna on Sri Venkateswara Art Films banner and directed by S. V. Krishna Reddy. Starring Jagapati Babu, Soundarya and music also composed by S. V. Krishna Reddy. The film is inspired from ANR's old Telugu film Pelli Naati Pramanalu 1958. The film recorded as a hit at the box office.

== Plot ==
The film begins with Krishna & Radha's marriage; they spend their seven years of married life happily. But after that, Radha becomes busy with household responsibilities. Krishna becomes fed up with her behavior and is attracted to his Secretary, Nisha. The rest of the story is about how Radha protects her husband.

== Cast ==
- Jagapati Babu as Krishna
- Soundarya as Radha Rani
- Asha Saini as Nisha
- Prakash Raj as Problem Paramkusam
- M. S. Narayana as Singaraju Lingaraju
- AVS as Marideswara Rao
- Brahmanandam as Anandam
- Tanikella Bharani
- L. B. Sriram
- Subbaraya Sharma
- Sivaji Raja
- Surya
- Mithai Chitti
- Gautham Raju
- Jenny
- Y. Vijaya
- Annapurna
- Sri Lakshmi
- Rajitha
- Siva Parvathi
- Parvathi
- Ratna Kumari
- Rajasri
- Alphonsa as item number
- Master Teja

== Soundtrack ==
Sardukupodaam Randi

Film score by S. V. Krishna Reddy
- Released: 2000
- Genre: Soundtrack
- Length: 24:44
- Label: Aditya Music
- Producer: S. V. Krishna Reddy

S. V. Krishna Reddy chronology
Kodanda Ramudu (2000)	Sardukupodaam Randi (2000)	Sri Srimati Satyabhama (2000)

Music composed by S. V. Krishna Reddy. Music released on ADITYA Music Company.

No.	Title	Lyrics	Singer(s)	Length
1.	"Alakaluru Needata"	Chandrabose	S. P. Balasubrahmanyam, Sujatha	4:28
2.	"Kottimeera Puvvulaanti Pillaro"	Chandrabose	Udit Narayan, Mahalakshmi Iyer	5:23
3.	"Kabaddi Kabaddi"	Chandrabose	Gangadhar, Sudha Rani	5:30
4.	"Vagalaadi Telisinda Ipudu"	Suddala Ashok Teja	Hariharan	4:35
5.	"Unnamaata Vinnavista"	Sirivennela Sitarama Sastry	Udit Narayan, Sunitha	4:34

== Reception ==
Andhra Today wrote "Director Krishna Reddi takes the familiar theme of the married couple and the trials and tribulations to their relationship with the advent of the "other woman". It might prove an impressive success with the female audiences. With entertainment and humor as main ingredients, the director makes the movie a smooth sail". Telugucinema wrote "On the whole it’s a clean family entertainer of SVK brand".

== Awards ==
- Nandi Award for Best Male Comedian - M. S. Narayana
