= Pelli Peetalu =

- DVD cover
- Directed by: S. V. Krishna Reddy
- Written by: Diwakar Babu (Dialogues)
- Screenplay by: S. V. Krishna Reddy
- Story by: Kamal
- Based on: Ee Puzhayum Kadannu (1996)
- Produced by: V. B. Rajendra Prasad
- Starring: Jagapati Babu; Soundarya
- Cinematography: Sarath
- Edited by: K. Ramgopal Reddy
- Music by: S. V. Krishna Reddy
- Production company: Jagapati Art Pictures
- Release date: 16 July 1998
- Running time: 141 minutes
- Country: India
- Language: Telugu

Pelli Peetalu (transl. Wedding Seats) is a 1998 Telugu-language romantic comedy film directed by S. V. Krishna Reddy. It stars Jagapati Babu, Soundarya with music composed by S. V. Krishna Reddy. It is produced by V. B. Rajendra Prasad under the Jagapati Art Pictures banner. The film was a hit at the box office as well as a musical hit and received positive reviews. The film was a remake of the Malayalam film Ee Puzhayum Kadannu (1996).

== Cast ==
- Jagapathi Babu as Gopi
- Soundarya as Anjali (Voice Dubbed by Saritha )
- Giri Babu as Rama Chandra Murthy
- Chandra Mohan as Chandram
- Kota Srinivasa Rao as Raghavayya
- Tanikella Bharani as Tatabbai
- Aanand Vardhan as Cable
- Sudhakar as Veera Babu
- Brahmaji as Brahmaji
- Raja Ravindra as Ravindra
- Sivaji Raja
- Hemanth as Raghu
- Chittajalu Lakshmipati
- Subbaraya Sharma
- Chitti Babu as a bus conductor
- Mithai Chitti as a vegetable seller
- Uttej
- Sudha as Amrutham, Chandram's wife
- Rajitha as Veera Babu's wife
- Jhansi as Aruna
- Shilpa as Aswini
- Tatineni Rajeswari as Anjali's Mother
- Telangana Shakuntala as Shakuntala, Ravindra's Mother
- Nirmalamma as Subba Lakshmi Anjali's grandmother

== Music ==
Pelli Peetalu

Film score by S. V. Krishna Reddy
- Released: 1998
- Genre: Soundtrack
- Length: 31:50
- Label: Music Two Thousand
- Producer: S. V. Krishna Reddy

S. V. Krishna Reddy chronology
Deerga Sumangali Bhava (1998)	Pelli Peetalu (1998)	Manasulo Maata (1999)

Music was composed by S. V. Krishna Reddy. Lyrics written by Chandrabose. The music released on Music Two Thousand Company. Singer K. S. Chithra has sung five songs for this film.

No.	Title	Singer(s)	Length
1.	"Chita Pata Chinikulu"	Srinivas, K.S.Chithra	4:12
2.	"Jil Jil Jil (F)"	K.S.Chithra	4:53
3.	"Mohanam Mohanam"	Krishnamraju, Pallavi	4:51
4.	"E Chaka Chaka"	K.S.Chithra, Krishnamraju, Sowmya Raoh	4:11
5.	"Jil Jil Jil"	K.S.Chithra, Srinivas	3:02
6.	"Pelli Peetalu"	K.S.Chithra, Mano, Nitya Santhoshini	5:30
7.	"Yamuna Tarangam"	Unni Krishnan, Pallavi	4:05
8.	"Rajelu Velliginchu (Slokam)"	Pallavi	1:06
Total length:			31:50

== Reception ==
A critic from Andhra Today wrote, "Taking a very ordinary story, the director put it straight to the audience without any frills or attractions".
