= Subhalagnam =

- DVD cover
- Directed by: S. V. Krishna Reddy
- Written by: Diwakar Babu (dialogues)
- Screenplay by: S. V. Krishna Reddy
- Story by: S. V. Krishna Reddy; Bhupathi Raja
- Produced by: K. Venkateswara Rao; C. Aswini Dutt (Presents)
- Starring: Jagapati Babu; Aamani; Roja
- Cinematography: Sarath
- Edited by: K. Ramgopal Reddy
- Music by: S. V. Krishna Reddy
- Distributed by: Sri Priyanka Pictures
- Release date: 30 September 1994
- Running time: 139 minutes
- Country: India
- Language: Telugu

Subhalagnam (transl. Auspicious period) is a 1994 Indian Telugu-language film co-written, directed, and scored by S. V. Krishna Reddy. It stars Jagapathi Babu, Aamani, and Roja. The film was produced by K. Venkateswara Rao under the Sri Priyanka Pictures banner and presented by C. Aswani Dutt. The plot follows a greedy woman who makes a financial deal to let another woman marry her husband.

Released on 30 September 1994, the film was a box office success. It received three Nandi Awards, inducing the Best Feature Film in addition to two Filmfare Awards. The film was remade in Tamil as Irattai Roja (1996), in Hindi as Judaai (1997), in Kannada as Ganga Yamuna (1997) and in Malayalam as Sundara Purushan (2001).

== Cast ==
- Jagapati Babu as Madhu
- Aamani as Radha (Voice Dubbed by Saritha)
- Roja as Lata (Voice Dubbed by Roja Ramani)
- Kota Srinivasa Rao as Bangarayah
- Brahmanandam as A. V. S.'s son-in-law
- Ali as Raja
- Tanikella Bharani as Doctor
- A. V. S. as Madhu's house owner
- Subbaraya Sharma as Lata's father
- Gundu Hanumantha Rao as Compounder
- Ananth as Soundarya's PA
- Manto
- Nittala Sriramachandra Murthy
- Soundarya as Herself
- Suhasini as Meena
- Annapoorna as Radha's mother
- Sri Lakshmi as A. V. S.'s wife and daughter (Dual role)

== Production ==
The film's story bears some resemblance to the American film Indecent Proposal (1993) which was based on the 1988 novel of same name.

== Music ==
Subhalagnam

Soundtrack album by S. V. Krishna Reddy
- Released: 1994
- Genre: Soundtrack
- Length: 22:03
- Label: Magna Sound
- Producer: S. V. Krishna Reddy

S. V. Krishna Reddy chronology
Number One (1994)	Subhalagnam (1994)	Yamaleela (1994)

The music was composed by the director S. V. Krishna Reddy himself.

Track list
No.	Title	Lyrics	Singer(s)	Length
1.	"Ghallu Ghallu"	Viswanatha Sastry	S. P. Balasubrahmanyam, K. S. Chithra	4:07
2.	"Allukupove Ose Malleteega"	Jonnavithhula Ramalingeswara Rao	S. P. Balasubrahmanyam, K. S. Chithra	4:31
3.	"Allari Tummeda"	Jonnavithhula Ramalingeswara Rao	S. P. Balasubrahmanyam, K. S. Chithra	4:16
4.	"Chiluka Ye Thodu Leka"	Sirivennela Seetharama Sastry	S. P. Balasubrahmanyam,	4:33
5.	"Poruginti Mangala Gowri"	Sirivennela Seetharama Sastry	S. P. Balasubrahmanyam, K. S. Chithra	4:32
6.	"Chinuku Chinuku Andelatho"	Jonnavithhula Ramalingeswara Rao	S. P. Balasubrahmanyam, K. S. Chithra	3:49
Total length:				25:50

== Accolades ==
Filmfare Awards

- Best Director – S. V. Krishna Reddy – won
- Best Actress – Aamani – won

Nandi Awards – 1994

- Second Best Feature Film – Silver – K. Venkateswara Rao
- Best Male Comedian – A. V. S.
- Best Lyricist – Sirivennela Sitaramasastri – "Chilaka Ye Todu Leka"
