= Adavi Dora =

- Theatrical poster
- Directed by: K.Sadasivarao
- Written by: Posani Krishna Murali (dialogues)
- Story by: Posani Krishna Murali
- Produced by: Chadalavada Srinivasa Rao
- Starring: Sobhan Babu; Nagma; Surabhi; Brahmanandam
- Music by: Koti
- Release date: 13 October 1995
- Country: India
- Language: Telugu

Adavi Dora (transl. Landlord of Jungle) is a 1995 Indian Telugu language film directed by K. Sadasivarao. The film stars Sobhan Babu, Nagma and Surabhi.

== Cast ==
- Sobhan Babu
- Nagma
- Surabhi
- Kaikala Satyanarayana
- Rami Reddy
- Giri Babu
- Brahmanandam
- Ali
- Dharmavarapu Subrahmanyam
- Rallapalli
- Gowtham Raju
- Tirupathi Prakash
- Narsing Yadav
- Jayalalitha
- Nirmalamma

== Soundtrack ==
Music was composed by Koti.

- "Gali Vena Pellanta"
- "Namo Narayana"
- "Nandigama Bulloda"
- "O Andhamaina Pilla"
