= Aahwanam =

- Promotional poster
- Directed by: S. V. Krishna Reddy
- Produced by: T. Trivikrama Rao
- Starring: Srikanth; Ramya Krishna; Heera; Brahmanandam
- Narrated by: S. V. Krishna Reddy
- Cinematography: Sarath
- Edited by: K. Ram Gopal Reddy
- Music by: S. V. Krishna Reddy
- Distributed by: Vijayalakshmi Art Movies
- Release date: 2 May 1997
- Country: India
- Language: Telugu

Aahwanam (transl. Invitation) is a 1997 Indian Telugu language film directed by S. V. Krishna Reddy. The film stars Srikanth, Ramya Krishna, and Heera. The director remade the film in English in 2012 as Divorce Invitation.

== Plot ==
The film centers on Ravi Kumar, a man who believes money is the only important thing in life, even more than family ties and affection. Once he goes to a village and plays a drama which results in his marriage with Rajeswari, a traditional woman from a wealthy family. They live happily for a while until Ravi runs into Sireesha, an even wealthier unmarried businesswoman. She falls in love with him, and Ravi, focused on her money, lies to her that he is married, but recently divorced. In order to marry Sireesha, Ravi files for divorce, devastating Rajeswari. Unwilling to lose her husband due to his greed, she tries in many different ways to change his mindset. When nothing works, Rajeswari accepts the divorce, but with the condition that her divorce be held as a grand ceremony, just as her marriage. At this event, in front of a statue of Goddess Raja Rajeswari, Rajeswari lights a yajna fire and holds her hair up asking Ravi to remove mangalsutra, then suddenly Ravi has a vision where it is Goddess Durga sitting in the place of Rajeswari, while threatening him with a trident (because the mangalsutra worn by Rajeswari was coincidentally identical to the one worn by Durga). A terrified Ravi, realizes the importance and sanctity of marriage and apologizes to his wife, who presents him a garland to remarry her again.

== Cast ==
- Srikanth as Ravi Kumar
- Ramya Krishna as Rajeswari
- Heera Rajagopal as Sireesha
- Ali as Cook
- Kaikala Satyanarayana as Satyanarayana
- Sakshi Ranga Rao as Shalabhayya
- Giri Babu as Ravi's father
- Kota Srinivasa Rao
- Babu Mohan
- Rallapalli
- P. J. Sharma
- Shiva Parvathi as Ravi's mother
- Gautam Raju
- Ironleg Sastri
- Gundu Hanumantha Rao
- Bandla Ganesh as Ravi's brother
- Nirmalamma as Erukala Subbi
- Chalapathi Rao as Sireesha's uncle
- Alapati Lakshmi
- Sri Lakshmi
- Dubbing Janaki
- Telangana Sakunthala
- Y. Vijaya
- Jhansi

== Production ==
The film was inspired by the Telugu film Pellinaati Pramanalu (1959), produced and directed by K. V. Reddy.

== Music ==
Aahwanam

Soundtrack album by S. V. Krishna Reddy
- Released: 1997
- Genre: Feature film soundtrack
- Length: 35:57
- Language: Telugu
- Label: Super Cassettes Industries

Music video
- Aahwanam – Jukebox on YouTube

All lyrics were written by Sirivennela Seetharama Sastry, except for "Minsare Minsare" which was written by Bhuvana Chandra. The song "Minsare Minsare" was based on Johnny Wakelin's "In Zaire". Two lines from the song "Srirasthu Subhamasthu" were incorporated by Seetharama Sastry into the song "Dharmardha Kamamulalona" in Johnny (2003).

Track list
No.	Title	Singer(s)	Length
1.	"Devatalaaraa"	S. P. Balasubrahmanyam, K. S. Chithra	4:53
2.	"Pandiri Vesina"	S. P. Balasubrahmanyam, K. S. Chithra	4:12
3.	"Hai Hai Naayaka"	Hariharan, K. S. Chithra	4:16
4.	"Manasa"	K. S. Chithra	3:31
5.	"Yelaloye"	S. P. Balasubrahmanyam, K. S. Chithra, Chorus	3:46
6.	"Srirasthu Subhamasthu"	S. P. Balasubrahmanyam, K. S. Chithra	7:09
7.	"Nee Manasulo Maata"	K. S. Chithra, Kaikala Satyanarayana, Nirmalamma, Prasanna Kumar	4:06
8.	"Minsare Minsare"	Hariharan, K. S. Chithra	3:59
Total length:			35:57

== Reception ==
Griddaluru Gopala Rao of Zamin Ryot gave the film a positive review praising the screenplay, music, and the performances of the cast. A critic from Andhra Today wrote, "If one glosses over the shortcomings of the climax, and enjoy the movie as an entertainer, 'Aahwanam' is a movie worth watching".

== Awards ==
Nandi Awards

- 1997 - Nandi Special Jury Award - S. V. Krishna Reddy
