= Number One (1994 film) =

- Directed by: S. V. Krishna Reddy
- Written by: Diwakar Babu (Dialogues)
- Story by: S. V. Krishna Reddy
- Starring: Krishna; Soundarya
- Cinematography: V. Srinivas Reddy
- Edited by: Ramgopal Reddy K.
- Music by: S. V. Krishna Reddy
- Production company: Shirdi Sai Films
- Release date: 14 January 1994
- Country: India
- Language: Telugu

Number One is a 1994 Indian Telugu-language film written and directed by S. V. Krishna Reddy. The film stars Krishna and Soundarya. The film was remade in Hindi as Daanveer with Mithun Chakraborty. The film was a hit at the box office and was the fourth highest grossing Telugu film of the year 1994.

== Plot ==
The plot revolves around a family that becomes orphaned after the death of the parents. The eldest son, Vijay, takes on the responsibility of supporting his siblings and ultimately achieves success through his efforts.

== Cast ==
- Krishna as Vijay
- Soundarya
- Kota Srinivasa Rao as Veeraswamy
- Ali
- Babu Mohan
- Maharshi Raghava
- Gundu Hanumantha Rao
- P. L. Narayana
- Srilatha
- Sivaji Raja
- Raja Ravindra as Ravi
- Subbaraya Sharma
- Y. Vijaya
- Mahesh Anand
- Brahmanandam
- Dilip Kumar Salvadi as young Vijay's brother
- Rajanala as Rajanala
- Nagabhushanam as Nagabhushanam

== Soundtrack ==
Number One

Soundtrack album by S. V. Krishna Reddy
- Released: 1994
- Length: 24:28

Music was composed by S. V. Krishna Reddy.

Track list
No.	Title	Lyrics	Singer(s)	Length
1.	"Andamaina"	Jonnavittula Ramalingeswara Rao	S. P. Balasubrahmanyam, K. S. Chithra	5:04
2.	"Kolu Kolu Koyilamma"	Jonnavittula Ramalingeswara Rao	S. P. Balasubrahmanyam, K. S. Chithra	5:07
3.	"Entha Naatu Premo"	Sirivennela Seetharama Sastry	S. P. Balasubrahmanyam, K. S. Chithra	4:07
4.	"Changu Bala Bagundi"	Sirivennela Seetharama Sastry	S. P. Balasubrahmanyam, K. S. Chithra	4:14
5.	"Vayyari Bhama"	Bhuvana Chandra	S. P. Balasubrahmanyam, K. S. Chithra	5:09
6.	"Theme Music"	Bhuvana Chandra	S. V. Krishna Reddy	4:09
Total length:				27:50
