= Sri Srimati Satyabhama =

- Directed by: S. V. Krishna Reddy
- Screenplay by: S. V. Krishna Reddy
- Starring: Rehman; Vijayashanti
- Cinematography: Sarath
- Edited by: Nandamuri Hari
- Music by: S. V. Krishna Reddy
- Production company: Suraj Movies
- Release date: 3 November 2000
- Running time: 144 mins
- Country: India
- Language: Telugu

Sri Srimati Satyabhama is a 2000 Indian Telugu-language romance film directed by S. V. Krishna Reddy starring Rehman and Vijayashanti. Reddy also wrote the screenplay and composed the music. The film failed at box-office.

== Plot ==
A rich businessman transfers his wealth to his brother-in-law's son, believing that the son, Ravi, and his adored daughter, Satyabhama, will soon be married. But after he dies of a heart attack, the brother-in-law evicts the businessman's widow and daughter from the house and sends his son to America. Fifteen years later, Ravi returns, still in love with Satyabhama, and despairing of his father allowing them to marry, poisons her and himself. Miraculously, he survives. She supposedly dies, but on a trip to New Zealand he meets and falls in love with a woman named Dolly, who strongly resembles her. He brings Dolly back to India, where she tells his father that she is in fact his niece in disguise, and makes his life miserable in various ways.

== Cast ==
- Rehman as Ravi
- Vijayashanti as Satyabhama
- Ranganath as Satyabhama's father
- Kolla Ashok Kumar as Narasimham
- Jayaprakash Reddy
- L. B. Sriram
- M. S. Narayana
- Brahmanandam
- Annapoorna
- Rallapalli
- Narra Venkateswara Rao as Doctor
- Sivaji Raja as Ravi's friend
- Fish Venkat as Narasimham's henchman

== Production ==
The film began production in 26 May 2000. The film was originally planned with Jagapathi Babu and Soundarya. The filming was held at Hyderabad and Spain.

== Soundtrack ==
All music is composed by S. V. Krishna Reddy

Track list
No.	Title	Lyrics	Singer(s)	Length
1.	"Rama Chiluka Ragalu"	Sirivennela Seetharama Sastry	K. S. Chithra	4:47
2.	"Thittu Kottu Dooram"	Chandrabose	S. P. Balasubrahmanyam, K. S. Chithra	4:56
3.	"Rama Chiluka Ragalu"	Sirivennela Seetharama Sastry	S. P. Balasubrahmanyam	4:48
4.	"Ice Cream Cuppulo"	Chandrabose	Nithyasree Mahadevan	5:31
5.	"Neeli Neeli Meghala"	Chandrabose	P. Jayachandran, K. S. Chithra	4:22
6.	"Meravake Nee"	Suddala Ashok Teja	Venkatachalam	4:57
7.	"Satyabhama"	Suddala Ashok Teja	Udit Narayan, Sujatha	5:27
Total length:				34:50

== Reception ==
Full Hyderabad wrote "These folks apparantly [sic] spent a couple of crores to give some gloss to the film. On hindsight, it proves to be a waste of precious money. The comedy is stupid, and the performances of other actors leave a lot to be desired. Sri Sreemati Satyabhama is bad. If you don't want to waste your valuable time, keep far away from the theaters". Andhra Online wrote "Vjaya Santhi has done her bit but the treatment of the story and plot by the director leaves one dazed and absolutely no scope for Vijaya Shanthi to display even a little bit of her vast talent. Music score by S.V.Krishna Reddy also does not score any points. The dialogues are very weak. The title of the film does not carry any meaning. If the director thinks that the title is a brilliant product of a brain-storm, we can only sympathise with him. The title 'Director's dilemma' is arguably more appropriate". Andhra Today wrote "S V Krishna Reddy truly tests the patience of the audience. Underestimation of the audience, meaningless story, illogical scenes and cheap comedy contribute towards making this movie a flop". Indiainfo wrote "Vijayshanti's efforts to hide her age by frolicking and giggling as 16-year-old make viewers turn and twist in their seats. The less said about S V Krishna Reddy's direction, the better. A person, who sets great store by his reputation as a director who makes family entertainers, could not have churned out such an inspid stuff. His music is also no great shakes. The viewers are advised to go with Jhandu Balm and a couple of Aspirn tablets, if they summon courage to see the movie after all that we have said".
