= Sri Lakshmi (actress) =

Indian actress

- Born: Aishwarya Lakshmi Priya; Chennai, India
- Occupation: Film actress
- Years active: 1980–present
- Relatives: Rajesh (brother); Aishwarya Rajesh (niece)

Aishwarya Lakshmi Priya, popularly known as Sri Lakshmi, is an Indian actress who is known for her comic roles in Telugu films. She has also appeared in Tamil films. More than 500 films to her credit, she later turned her attention towards television serials. Lakshmi has received four Nandi Awards for Best Female Comedian.

== Early life ==
Aishwarya Lakshmi Priya was born and brought up in Madras into a Telugu family from Rajahmundry, East Godavari district, Andhra Pradesh. Her father Amarnath and brother Rajesh were actors. Rajesh's daughter Aishwarya is also a film actress.

== Career ==
Daughter of veteran Telugu actor/Producer Dr. Amarnath, Aishwarya Lakshmi Priya entered the film industry to support her family after her father had fallen sick. Initially, she did minimal and unnoticeable characters. After noticing her spark in playing comedic roles, director Jandhyala offered her a meatier role in Rendu Jella Sita, which turned her career. In the Telugu film industry, she acted in comedy films by ace director, Jandhyala. She also acted in K. Viswanath films in comedy roles. She acted in more than 500 films, including Tamil, Kannada, etc. She later turned to TV plays. She is typically associated with stereo comic roles.

== Filmography ==
=== Films ===
==== Telugu ====
Film	Year	Role	Ref.
1980	Prema Tarangalu		
1981	Kondaveeti Simham		
1981	Ooriki Ichina Maata	Roopa's friend	
1981	Swargam	Uma	
1982	Shriman Shrimati		
1982	Nalugu Stambhalata		
1983	Amarajeevi		
1983	Manthri Gari Viyyankudu		
1983	Kirayi Kotigadu	Durga	
1983	Puttadi Bomma		
1983	Poratam		
1983	Rendu Jella Seetha		
1983	Ananda Bhairavi		
1983	Raju Rani Jackie	Parvathi	
1984	James Bond 999	Arumugam's wife	
1984	Kanchu Kagada		
1984	Raraju		
1984	Daku		
1984	Srimathi Kavali		
1984	Rama Rao Gopal Rao a.k.a. Rao Gopal Rao	Mangathayaru	
1984	Dandayatra		
1984	Srivariki Premalekha		
1985	Vijetha		
1985	Ooriki Soggadu		
1985	Aalaapana		
1985	Edadugula Bandham		
1985	Bhale Thammudu		
1985	Mayadari Maridi		
1985	Aadapille Nayam		
1985	Maharaju		
1985	Pattabhishekam		
1985	Babai Abbai		
1985	Mogudu Pellalu		
1986	Rendu Rella Aaru		
1986	Captain Nagarjuna		
1986	Chantabbai		
1986	Srimathi Kanuka		
1986	Brahma Rudrulu		
1986	Naga Devatha		
1986	Chadastapu Mogudu		
1986	Brahmastram	Sundari	
1986	Papikondalu		
1986	Santhi Nivasam	Sundari	
1986	Aranyakanda		
1986	Jeevana Poratam		
1986	Pratidwani		
1986	Adavi Raja	Giligili	
1986	Chanakya Shapatham	Chitti	
1987	Collector Gari Abbai		
1987	Srinivasa Kalyanam		
1987	Rowdy Babai		
1987	Saradhamba		
1987	Gundamma Gari Krishnulu		
1987	Manmadha Leela Kamaraju Gola		
1987	Sthree Sahasam	Mohana	
1987	President Gari Abbayi		
1987	Ramu		
1987	Attagaru Zindabad		
1987	Hanthakudi Veta		
1987	Rotation Chakravarthy		
1987	Maavoori Magaadu		
1988	Janaki Ramudu		
1988	Pelli Chesi Choodu		
1988	Annapurnamma Gari Alludu		
1988	Praja Pratinidhi		
1988	Raktha Thilakam		
1988	Jhansi Rani		
1988	Collector Vijaya		
1988	Thodallullu		
1988	Bhama Kalapam		
1988	Choopulu Kalasina Subhavela		
1988	Rakthabhishekam		
1988	Chinni Krishnudu		
1988	Sahasam Cheyara Dimbhaka		
1988	Intinti Bhagavatam		
1988	Swarnakamalam		
1988	Prema Kireetam		
1988	Varasudochhadu		
1989	Bhale Dampathulu		
1989	Manchi Kutumbam		
1989	Bandhuvulostunnaru Jagratha		
1989	Rajakeeya Chadarangam		
1989	Poolarangadu		
1989	Bava Bava Panneeru		
1989	Sarvabhoumudu		
1989	Mamathala Kovela		
1989	Chalaki Mogudu Chadastapu Pellam	Janaki	
1989	Krishna Gari Abbayi		
1989	Oorantha Golanta	Chilaka	
1989	Preminchi Choodu		
1989	Jayammu Nischayammu Raa		
1989	Hai Hai Nayaka		
1989	Sahasame Naa Oopiri	Head Nurse Sowbhagyam	
1990	Puttinti Pattu Cheera		
1990	Prananiki Pranam	Subbu	
1990	Sahasa Putrudu		
1990	Kaliyuga Rudrulu		
1990	Chevilo Puvvu		
1991	Aditya 369		
1991	Edurinti Mogudu Pakkinti Pellam		
1991	Pichi Pullaya		
1991	Iddaru Pellala Muddula Police		
1991	Kobbari Bondam		
1991	Talli Tandrulu		
1992	Brundavanam		
1992	Chilara Mogudu Allari Koduku		
1992	Babai Hotel		
1992	Mogudu Pellala Dongata		
1993	Ish Gup Chup		
1993	Repati Rowdy		
1993	Jamba Lakidi Pamba		
1993	Naga Jyothi		
1993	Pellama Majaka		
1993	Ladies Special		
1993	Mayalodu		
1993	One by Two		
1993	Rajendrudu Gajendrudu		
1994	Shubha Lagnam		
1994	Brahmachari Mogudu		
1994	Kishkindha Kanda		
1994	Palleturi Mogudu		
1994	M. Dharmaraju M.A.		
1994	Gharana Alludu		
1995	Subha Sankalpam		
1995	Ghatothkachudu		
1995	Love Game		
1995	Aadaalla Majaka		
1995	Vajram		
1996	Pelli Sandadi		
1996	Oho Naa Pellanta		
1996	Akkum Bakkum		
1996	Hello Guru		
1996	Sahanam		
1997	Chelikaadu		
1997	Ugadi		
1997	Aahwanam		
1997	Oka Chinna Maata		
1997	Aaro Pranam		
1997	Egire Paavurama		
1997	Chinnabbayi		
1998	Love Story 1999		
1998	Gillikajjalu		
1998	Kodukulu		
1998	Pandaga		
1999	Police		
1999	Iddaru Mithrulu	Alka	
1999	Preminche Manasu		
2000	Sardukupodaam Randi		
2001	Apparao Ki Oka Nela Thappindi		
2001	Preminchu		
2001	Akasa Veedhilo		
2002	Holi		
2002	Tappu Chesi Pappu Koodu		
2003	Palnati Brahmanayudu		
2005	Dhairyam	Makarana's mother	
2005	Youth	Velu's mother	
2008	Appu Chesi Pappu Koodu		
2009	Neramu Siksha		
2010	Golimar		
2011	Gaganam	Jaanu	
2012	Dhoni		
2013	Sukumarudu		
2014	Erra Bus		
2020	Amaram Akhilam Prema		
2021	Savithri W/O Sathyamurthy	Savithri	
2023	Agent	Vidya's mother	Uncredited role
2024	Inti No. 13		
2024	Committee Kurrollu	Idly Mama	
2024	Ravikula Raghurama	Nisha’s grandmother	
2024	Veeranjaneyulu Viharayatra		
2025	Santhana Prapthirasthu		
2026	Cheekatilo		
2026	Gaayapadda Simham	Dharahas’s grandmother	
2026	Maa Inti Bangaaram	Anirudh’s grandmother	

==== Tamil ====
- Sparisam (1982) - Debut in Tamil
- Rendu Pondatti Kaavalkaaran (1992)
- Payanam (2011) as Jaanu
- Dhoni (2012)

=== Television ===
Year	Title	Role	Network
2003–2005	Jayam		ETV
2008–2013	Mogali Rekulu		Gemini TV
2009–2010	Rudra		Zee Tamil
2011–2012	Sravani Subramanyam		Gemini TV
2013-2016	Agni Poolu		Gemini TV
2014-2015	Ramulamma		Maa TV
2014–2016	Nenu Ayana Aruguru Attalu		Zee Telugu
2014–2016	Sundarakanda		Gemini TV; Polimer TV; Puthuyugam TV
2014–2016	Meghamala		ETV
2016–2020	Naa Peru Meenakshi		ETV
2017–2018	OK Jaanu		Star Maa
2017–2020	Agni Sakshi		Star Maa
2019–2020	Roja	Annapurani	Gemini TV
2019	Mathrudevobhava	Gayatri Devi	Gemini TV
2021	Locked	Padmini	Aha
2021–2022	Muthyamantha Muddu	Srilakshmi	Zee Telugu
2024 – Present	Yeto Vellipoyindi Manasu	Sushila	Star Maa

=== Dubbing ===
- The Chronicles of Narnia: The Voyage of the Dawn Treader (2010): Telugu version dub

== Awards ==
Nandi Awards

- Best Female Comedian - Sahanam (1996)
- Best Female Comedian - Chelikaadu (1997)
- Best Female Comedian - Police (1999)
- Best Female Comedian - Preminchu (2001)
