= Jonnavittula Ramalingeswara Rao =

Indian film lyricist and a poet (born 1959)

Jonnavithula Ramalingeswara Rao
- Born: 7 July 1959 (age 67); Vijayawada, Andhra Pradesh, India
- Education: M. A (Telugu), Bhasha Praveena
- Occupations: Lyricist, Poet, Avadhani
- Years active: 1986-present
- Spouse: Seshu Kumari
- Children: Lakshmi Suvarna; Lakshmi Annapoorna; Manikya Teja
- Parents: Subbarao (father); Lakshmi Narasamma (mother)
- Awards: Filmfare Award for Best Lyricist – Telugu

Jonnavithula Ramalingeswara Rao is an Indian film lyricist, politician and a poet known for his works in Telugu Cinema. He is also known for his parody songs. He won Filmfare Award for Best Lyricist – Telugu for the film Sri Rama Rajyam (2011).

He wrote 56 poems about Telugu language in the name of Telugu Sankharavam.

== Personal life ==
Jonnavithula was born on 7 July 1959 in Vijayawada to Subbarao and Lakshmi Narasamma in a Telugu family. His father a teacher in an elementary school. He was also active participant in the mythological dramas.

In June 2023, he established political party Jai Telugu Party. In May 2024, he contested in Andhra Pradesh assembly elections in Vijayawada Central constituency as an independent candidate. However, he lost the elections, while garnering a total of 499 votes.

== Selected filmography ==
Year	Film	Song
1988	Vivaha Bhojanambu	
1989	Ontari Poratam	
1989	Preminchi Choodu	
1990	Lorry Driver	
1990	Prema Zindabad	
1992	Moratodu Naa Mogudu	
1994	Subhalagnam	
1995	Ghatotkachudu	
1995	Dear Brother	
1995	Pokiri Raja	
1995	Madhya Taragati Mahabharatam	
1995	Gharana Bullodu	
1995	Vajram	
1996	Merupu	
1999	Devi	
2000	Devullu	
2001	Devi Putrudu	
2001	Railway Coolie	
2002	Tappu Chesi Pappu Koodu	
2006	Vikramarkudu	
2011	Sakthi	
2011	Sri Rama Rajyam	
2012	Damarukam	
2012	Mithunam	
2017	DJ: Duvvada Jagannadham	
