= Gundu Hanumantha Rao =

Indian actor

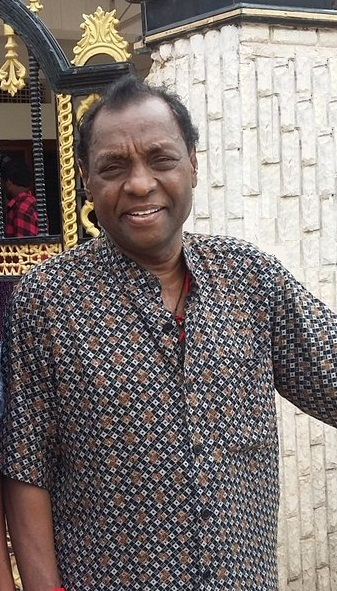
- Born: 15 October 1956; Vijayawada, Andhra Pradesh, India
- Died: 19 February 2018 (aged 61)
- Occupations: Actor; comedian
- Years active: 1982–2018

Gundu Hanumantha Rao (15 October 1956–19 February 2018) was an Indian actor and comedian who worked predominantly in Telugu films, theatre, and television.

== Career ==
Gundu Hanumantha Rao was in confectionery business before stepping into the entertainment industry. He first appeared in Jandhyala's film Aha Naa Pellanta in 1987 and gained popularity in comedian roles in S. V. Krishna Reddy's films. He is known for his roles in Rajendrudu Gajendrudu, Mayalodu, Yamaleela, Srivariki Premalekha, Pellaniki Premalekha Priyuraliki Subhalekha (1992), Apparao Driving School, and the TV serial Amrutham. He won three TV Nandi Awards from Andhra Pradesh Government, one of them for Amrutham serial. He was a renowned stage artist before entering into cinema, his first drama being "Ravana Bramha" at the age of 18. He acted in over 600 movies in Telugu and was a popular TV artist.

== Personal life ==
In 2014 elections, Hanumantha Rao joined Chitti Babu Punyamurthula and Pinki at rallies in support of the Telugu Desam Party. His campaign in the rallies added humour and provided comic relief to the people. He died on 19 February 2018 at 3:30 am in Hyderabad, India, due to sudden cardiac arrest secondary to chronic kidney disease.

== Television ==
- Amrutham (2001–2007) as Aamudaala Anjaneyalu
- Aanando Bramha (DD Saptagiri)
- Aalu Baalu (2005) (ETV)
- Aalasyam Amrutham Visham (2005) (MAA TV)
- Popula Pette (1997) (ETV)
- Sambaraala Rambabu (2007) (MAA TV)
- Yuvaa (2007) (MAA TV)
- Srimathi Sri Subramanyam (2009) (ETV Telugu)
- Saradaaga Kasepu (2017) (ETV Plus)
- Naaticharaami (2017) (Gemini TV)

== Filmography ==
=== Telugu ===
- Srivariki Premalekha (1984)
- Aha Naa Pellanta (1987)
- Satyagraham (1987)
- Raktha Tilakam (1988)
- Brahma Putrudu (1988)
- Vivaha Bhojanambu (1988)
- Chinababu (1988)
- Kallu (1988)
- Prema (1989)
- Hai Hai Nayaka (1989)
- Sakshi (1989)
- Yuvabharatham (1990)
- Chevilo Puvvu (1990)
- People's Encounter (1991)
- Vichitra Prema (1991)
- Pichichi Pullayya (1991)
- Minor Raja (1991)
- Prema Entha Madhuram (1991)
- Kobbari Bondam (1991)
- Babai Hotel (1992)
- Pellaniki Premalekha Priyuraliki Subhalekha (1992)
- Samsarala Mechanic (1992)
- Mogudu Pellala Dongata (1992)
- Allari Alludu (1993)
- Rowdy Gari Teacher (1993)
- Shh Ghup Chup (1993)
- Prema Chitram Pelli Vichitram (1993)
- Pekata Papa Rao (1993)
- Asale Pellaina Vanni (1993)
- Mayalodu (1993)
- Rajendrudu Gajendrudu (1993)
- Sarasaala Soggadu (1993) as Chengala Rayudu
- Yamaleela (1994)
- Gharana Alludu (1994) as M.L.A Chinna Reddy / Pickpocket / Sub-Inspector of Police
- Nannagaru (1994)
- Namasthe Anna (1994)
- Top Hero (1994)
- Kishkindha Kanda (1994)
- Criminal (1994)
- Vajram (1995)
- Love Game (1995)
- Real Hero (1995)
- Madhya Taragati Mahabharatam (1995)
- Ammaleni Puttillu (1995)
- Rikshavodu (1995)
- Mayadari Kutumbam (1995)
- Alluda Majaka (1995)
- Kondapalli Rataiah (1995)
- Amma Donga (1995)
- Badilli (1995)
- Leader (1995)
- Pokiri Raja (1995)
- Vaddu Bava Thappu (1995)
- Alibaba Adbhuta Deepam (1995) as Gundu Hanumanthu
- Ghatothkachudu (1995)
- Mrugam (1996)
- Bombay Priyudu (1996)
- Mummy Mee Aayanochadu (1996)
- Nayudu Gari Kutumbam (1996) as Anji Babu
- Pellala Rajyam (1996)
- Pelli Sandadi (1996)
- Bobbili Bullodu (1996)
- Puttinti Gowravam (1996)
- Akkum Bakkum (1996)
- Oho Naa Pellanta (1996)
- Akka! Bagunnava? (1996)
- Maavichiguru (1996)
- Vinodam (1996)
- Kuturu (1996)
- Jabilamma Pelli (1996)
- Sahasa Veerudu Sagara Kanya (1996)
- Gunshot (1996)
- Chilakkottudu (1997)
- Annamayya (1997)
- Preminchukundam Raa (1997)
- Oka Chinna Maata (1997)
- Aahwanam (1997)
- Pattukondi Chuddam (1997)
- Super Heroes (1997)
- Kaliyugamlo Gandargolam (1997)
- Thoka Leni Pitta (1997)
- W/o V. Vara Prasad (1997)
- Priyamaina Srivaru (1997)
- Master (1997)
- Super Heros (1997)
- Shrimati Vellosta (1998)
- Choodalani Vundi (1998)
- Ganesh (1998)
- Pandaga (1998)
- Gamyam (1998) as Boxing coach
- Naga Shakthi (1998)
- Sneham Kosam (1999)
- Samarasimha Reddy (1999)
- Police (1999) as M.L.A. Sathyam
- Bharata Ratna (1999)
- Rajakumarudu (1999)
- Hello...Yama! (1999)
- Mechanic Mavayya (1999)
- Manasu Paddanu Kaani (2000)
- Sivanna (2000)
- Manasichanu (2000)
- College (2000)
- Narasimha Naidu (2001)
- Darling Darling (2001) as STD/ISD Booth Owner
- Raa (2001)
- Narahari (2001)
- Nuvvu Leka Nenu Lenu (2002)
- Chandravamsam (2002)
- Lagna Patrika (2002)
- Seema Simham (2002)
- Tappu Chesi Pappu Koodu (2002)
- Premalo Pavani Kalyan (2002)
- Palnati Brahmanayudu (2003)
- Pellam Oorelithe (2003)
- Neeke Manasichaanu (2003) as Priest
- Jodi No. 1 (2003)
- Nenu Seetamahalakshmi (2003)
- Seshadri Naidu (2004)
- Varsham (2004)
- Kedi No. 1 (2004)
- Apparao Driving School (2004)
- Balu ABCDEFG (2005)
- Nuvvostanante Nenoddantana (2005)
- Dhairyam (2005)
- Allari Pidugu (2005)
- Naa Oopiri (2005)
- Bhadra (2005)
- Gowtam SSC (2005)
- Maayajaalam (2006)
- Sri Krishna 2006 (2006)
- Veerabhadra (2006)
- Tata Birla Madhyalo Laila (2006)
- Evadaithe Nakenti (2007)
- Gundamma Gaari Manavadu (2007)
- Chandrahas (2007)
- Aata (2007)
- Shankar Dada Zindabad (2007)
- Yamagola Malli Modalayindi (2007)
- Takkari (2007)
- Mr. Medhavi (2008)
- 1940 Lo Oka Gramam (2008)
- Pandurangadu (2008)
- Veedu Mamoolodu Kadu (2008)
- Deepavali (2008) as Gundu family head
- Original (2009)
- Neramu Siksha (2009)
- Glamour (2010)
- High School (2010)
- Mynavathi (2010)
- Pappu (2010)
- Prem Rajyam (2010)
- Sandadi (2010)
- Jayammu Nischayammuraa (2011)
- Naaku O Loverundhi (2011)
- Dhoni (2012)
- Idi Mamulu Prema Katha Kadu (2012)
- Mr. 7 (2012)
- Tuneega Tuneega (2012)
- Abbo Vaada (2013)
- Colors (2013)
- Kothoka Vintha (2013)
- NRI (2013)
- O Varsham Kurisina Rathri
- Rowdy Gari Pellam (2013)
- Swamy Satyananda (2013)
- Aadu Magaadra Bujji (2013)
- Ila Choodu Okasaari (2014)
- A Shyam Gopal Varma Film (2015)
- Vadevvadaina Sare Nenu Ready (2015)
- Mano Balam (2016)
- A Aa (2016)
- Sri Sai Sankalpam (2016)
- Panchamukhi (2018)
- Babala Bagotham (2018)
- Aaradugula Bullet (2021) (posthumous release)
- Sri Sai Sankalpam (2023) (posthumous release)

=== Tamil ===
- Jolly (1998)
- Nadigai (2008)
- Dhoni (2012)

=== Deccani ===
- Thriller (2008) as Lecturer

=== Voice actor ===
Year	Title	Voiced for	Character	Language	Notes
2006	Himsinche Raju 23rd Pulikesi	Singamuthu	Parepalli Kondanadudu	Telugu	Dubbed version

== Awards ==
=== Nandi TV Awards ===
- Adhi Thalam
- Amrutham (2007) (Gemini TV)
- Srimathi Sri Subramanyam (2009)
