= S. V. Krishna Reddy =

Indian film director, screenwriter, composer and actor

- Born: Satti Venkata Krishna Reddy; 1 June 1961 (age 65); Konkuduru, East Godavari District, Andhra Pradesh, India
- Occupations: Film director; screenwriter; composer; actor
- Years active: 1986—present
- Known for: Romantic comedy; Screwball comedy
- Awards: Filmfare Awards South; Nandi Awards
- Website: https://www.svkrishnareddy.com

Satti Venkata Krishna Reddy (born 1 June 1961) is an Indian film director, screenwriter, composer, and actor known for his work in Telugu cinema. He has garnered three state Nandi Awards and the Filmfare Best Telugu Director Award. He mostly directed films of the comedy genre.

His notable films include Rajendrudu Gajendrudu (1993), Mayalodu (1993), Number One (1994), Yamaleela (1994), Subha Lagnam (1994), Ghatothkachudu (1995), Maavi Chiguru (1996), Vinodam (1996), Egire Paavurama (1997), Aahvaanam (1997), Ooyala (1998), Premaku Velayara (1999), Sardukupodaam Randi (2000), Pellam Oorelithe (2003), Athade Oka Sainyam (2004), and Hungama (2005). In 2012 he directed the romantic comedy Divorce Invitation, an American film.

== Early life and film career ==
Krishna was born in Konkuduru village, East Godavari district of Andhra Pradesh. After his post-graduation in Bheemavaram, he moved to Hyderabad and ran a sweet shop for a few years before foraying into cinemas. His first notable work is Kobbari Bondam (1991), which was produced by Manisha Films and was a commercial success. His association with Atchi Reddy and Manisha films continued and most of his films were produced by Manisha films. After Kobbari Bondam, he directed Ranjendrudu Gajendrudu.

=== Breakthrough ===
Yamaleela, a film starring Ali in his debut in a lead role, is a huge success and was the start of an era of S. V. Krishna Reddy style films that had comedy, family emotions, and good songs. Films like Number One (1994), Subha Lagnam (1994), Ghatothkachudu (1995), Maavichiguru (1996), Vinodam (1996), Egire Paavurama (1997), Aahvaanam (1997) were all commercially successful. Srikanth, Jagapathi Babu, Rajendra Prasad, Soundarya, Kota, Babu Mohan, Ali, Brahmanandam, A.V.S., Gundu Hanumantha Rao were all frequent collaborators.

=== Acting ===
He played a small role in the 1986 film Kirathakudu. He made his debut as a lead in the 1997 film Ugaadi. Acted in Sambaram starring Nitiin

== Memberships ==
- DGA - Directors Guild of America
- TFDA - Telugu Film Directors Association

== Awards ==
Nandi Awards

- 2001 - Best Director - Sakutumba Saparivaara Sametham
- 1997 - Special Jury Award for Aahvaanam

Filmfare Awards South

- 1994 - Filmfare Best Director Award (Telugu) - Subhalagnam

== Filmography ==
=== Film ===
Year	Film	Director	Writer	Music composer	Notes
1991	Kobbari Bondam	No	Yes	Yes	Also co-producer
1993	Rajendrudu Gajendrudu	Yes	Yes	Yes	
1993	Mayalodu	Yes	Yes	Yes	
1994	Number One	Yes	Yes	Yes	
1994	Yamaleela	Yes	Yes	Yes	
1994	Subha Lagnam	Yes	Yes	Yes	
1995	Top Hero	Yes	Yes	Yes	
1995	Vajram	Yes	Screenplay	Yes	Remake of Malayalam film Sphatikam
1995	Ghatothkachudu	Yes	Yes	Yes	
1996	Gunshot	Yes	Yes	Yes	
1996	Maavi Chiguru	Yes	Yes	Yes	
1996	Vinodam	Yes	Yes	Yes	
1996	Sampradayam	Yes	Yes	Yes	
1997	Egire Paavurama	Yes	Yes	Yes	
1997	Aahvaanam	Yes	Yes	Yes	
1997	Ugaadi	Yes	Yes	Yes	Also actor and singer
1998	Ooyala	Yes	Yes	Yes	
1998	Pelli Peetalu	Yes	Screenplay	Yes	Remake of Malayalam film Ee Puzhayum Kadannu
1998	Deergha Sumangali Bhava	Yes	Yes	Yes	
1998	Abhishekam	Yes	Yes	Yes	Also actor
1999	Manasulo Maata	Yes	Screenplay	Yes	Remake of Tamil film Kannethirey Thondrinal
1999	Premaku Velayara	Yes	Screenplay	Yes	Based on novel Lakshyam
2000	Kodanda Ramudu	Yes	Yes	Yes	
2000	Sardukupodaam Randi	Yes	Yes	Yes	
2000	Sri Srimathi Satyabhama	Yes	Yes	Yes	
2000	Sakutumba Saparivaara Sametham	Yes	Yes	Yes	
2001	Budget Padmanabham	Yes	Screenplay	Yes	Remake of Tamil film Budget Padmanabhan
2001	Jabili	Yes	Yes	Yes	
2002	Premaku Swagatham	Yes	Yes	Yes	
2003	Pellam Oorelithe	Yes	Screenplay	No	Remake of Tamil film Charlie Chaplin
2003	Pellamtho Panenti	Yes	Yes	Yes	
2004	Athade Oka Sainyam	Yes	Yes	Yes	
2004	Letha Manasulu	Yes	Screenplay	No	Remake of Tamil film Azhagi
2004	Orey Pandu	Yes	Screenplay	No	Remake of Hindi film Koi... Mil Gaya
2005	Hungama	Yes	Screenplay	Yes	Remake of Malayalam film Maatupetti Machan
2006	Sarada Saradaga	Yes	Yes	Yes	
2006	Maayajaalam	Yes	Yes	Yes	
2007	Bahumati	Yes	Yes	Yes	
2009	Masth	Yes	Yes	Yes	
2012	Divorce Invitation	Yes	Yes	No	English; Remake of His Telugu film Aahvaanam
2014	Yamaleela 2	Yes	Yes	Yes	
2023	Organic Mama Hybrid Alludu	Yes	Yes	Yes	
TBA	VedaVyas	Yes	Yes	Yes	Filming

Cameo appearances

- Kirathakudu (1986)
- Manasutho (2002)
- Sambaram (2003)
- NTR: Kathanayakudu (2019)
- Nenu Meeku Baaga Kavalsinavaadini (2022)

=== Television ===
- Yamaleela Aa Taruvatha (ETV Telugu)
