= List of Tamil films of 2000 =

Prior to the amendment of Tamil Nadu Entertainments Tax Act 1939 on 12 June 2000, Gross was 130 per cent of Nett for all films. Post-amendment, Gross fell to 125 per cent of Nett. Commercial Taxes Department disclosed ₹6 crore in entertainment tax revenue for the year.

A list of films produced in the Tamil film industry in India in 2000 by release date:

== Box office collection ==
The following is the list of highest-grossing Tamil cinema films released in 2000.

| # | Implies that the film is multilingual and the gross collection figure includes the worldwide collection of the other simultaneously filmed version. |

The Highest Worldwide Gross of 2000
| Rank | Title | Production company | Worldwide gross |
|---|---|---|---|
| 1 | Vaanathaippola | Oscars Films P. Ltd | ₹25 crore |
| 2 | Thenali | R.K. Celluloids | ₹22 crore |
| 3 | Kushi | Sri Surya Movies | ₹20 crore |
| 4 | Alai Payuthey | Madras Talkies | ₹15 crore |
| 5 | Kandukondain Kandukondain | V Creations | ₹14 crore |
| 6 | Priyamaanavale | Gita Chitra International | ₹10 crore |
| 7 | Parthen Rasithen | Serene Movie Makers | ₹9.5 crore |
| 8 | Vetri Kodi Kattu | Sivasakthi Movie Makers | ₹9 crore |

== Films ==
=== January — March ===
| Opening | | Title | Director | Cast | Studio | Ref |
|---|---|---|---|---|---|---|
| J A N | 14 | Kadhal Rojavae | K. R. | George Vishnu, Pooja Kumar, Sarath Babu | Oscar Movies | |
| J A N | 14 | Kannukkul Nilavu | Fazil | Vijay, Shalini, Kaveri, Raghuvaran | Chinthamani Cine Arts | |
| J A N | 14 | Thirunelveli | Bharathi Kannan | Prabhu, Roja, Karan, Udhaya, Sithara, Vindhya | Super Good Films | |
| J A N | 14 | Vaanathaippola | Vikraman | Vijayakanth, Prabhu Deva, Livingston, Meena, Kausalya, Anju Aravind | Oscar Films | |
| F E B | 4 | Eazhaiyin Sirippil | K. Subash | Prabhu Deva, Roja, Kausalya, Suvalakshmi | Sudhalakshmi Pictures | |
| F E B | 4 | Good Luck | Manoj Bhatnagar | Prashanth, Riya Sen, Raghuvaran, Suhasini | Sameera Films | |
| F E B | 11 | Annai | Manobala | Bhanupriya, Nassar, Ramesh Khanna, Manobala | SG Telearts | |
| F E B | 18 | Hey Ram | Kamal Haasan | Kamal Haasan, Shahrukh Khan, Rani Mukerji, Vasundhara Das, Hema Malini | Raaj Kamal Films International | |
| F E B | 18 | Sudhandhiram | Raj Kapoor | Arjun, Rambha, Ranjith, Raghuvaran, Radhika | KRG Movies International | |
| F E B | 18 | Thai Poranthachu | R. K. Kalaimani | Prabhu, Kausalya, Karthik, Vivek | Anbalaya Films | |
| F E B | 25 | Mugavaree | V. Z. Durai | Ajith Kumar, Jyothika, Suchindra, Raghuvaran, K. Viswanath | NIC Arts | |
| M A R | 10 | Kakkai Siraginilae | P. Vasu | Parthiban, Preetha Vijayakumar, Lakshmi, K. Viswanath, Vadivelu | Anand Movie Land | |

=== April — June ===
| Opening | | Title | Director | Cast | Studio | Ref |
|---|---|---|---|---|---|---|
| A P R | 14 | Alaipayuthey | Mani Ratnam | Madhavan, Shalini, Swarnamalya | Madras Talkies | |
| A P R | 14 | Rajakali Amman | Rama Narayanan | Ramya Krishnan, Kausalya, Karan, Vadivelu | Kavithalayaa Productions | |
| A P R | 14 | Sandhitha Velai | Ravichandran | Karthik, Roja, Kausalya | Roja Combines | |
| A P R | 14 | Vallarasu | N. Maharajan | Vijayakanth, Devayani | Captain Cine Creations | |
| A P R | 21 | James Pandu | Selva | Parthiban, Prabhu Deva, Kausalya | Vishwas | |
| A P R | 21 | Veeranadai | Seeman | Sathyaraj, Arun Pandian, Khushbu, Uma, Goundamani, Senthil | Muthu Movies | |
| A P R | 28 | Athey Manithan | K. Rajeswar | Livingston, Maheswari, Lakshmi | Annai Cine Arts | |
| M A Y | 5 | Kandukondain Kandukondain | Rajiv Menon | Mammooty, Ajith Kumar, Tabu, Aishwarya Rai, Abbas | V Creations | |
| M A Y | 6 | Kandha Kadamba Kathir Vela | Rama Narayanan | Prabhu, S. Ve. Sekhar, Roja, Nirosha, Vivek, Vadivelu | Sri Thenandal Films | |
| M A Y | 19 | Kushi | S. J. Surya | Vijay, Jyothika, Mumtaj | Sri Surya Movies | |
| M A Y | 26 | Kannan Varuvaan | Sundar C | Karthik, Divya Unni, Mantra, Goundamani, Senthil | Lakshmi Movie Makers | |
| M A Y | 26 | Unnai Kodu Ennai Tharuven | Kavi Kalidas | Ajith Kumar, Simran | Super Good Films | |
| J U N | 2 | Magalirkkaga | Indian | Khushbu, Ambika, Vindhya, Ranjith | Akshaya Movies | |
| J U N | 9 | Karisakattu Poove | Kasthuri Raja | Napoleon, Khushbu, Vineeth, Ravali | Kasthoori Manga Creations | |
| J U N | 16 | Appu | Vasanth | Prashanth, Devayani, Vignesh, Kaveri, Prakash Raj | Kavithalayaa Productions | |
| J U N | 16 | Ennamma Kannu | Sakthi Chidambaram | Sathyaraj, Devayani, Vadivelu | Evergreen Movie International | |
| J U N | 23 | Nagalingam | Babu Ganesh | Babu Ganesh, Ravali, Neena, Prithiveeraj | Bala Vignesh Creations | |
| J U N | 30 | Vetri Kodi Kattu | Cheran | Parthiban, Murali, Meena, Malavika, Vadivelu | Sivasakthi Movie Makers | |

=== July — September ===
| Opening | | Title | Director | Cast | Studio | Ref |
|---|---|---|---|---|---|---|
| J U L | 7 | Pennin Manathai Thottu | Ezhil | Prabhu Deva, Sarath Kumar, Jaya Seal | Roja Combines | |
| J U L | 14 | Koodi Vazhnthal Kodi Nanmai | V. Sekhar | Nassar, Karan, Khushbu, Roja, Vadivelu, Vivek | Thiruvalluvar Kalaikoodam | |
| J U L | 21 | Kuberan | Rama Narayanan | Karthik, Kausalya, Mantra | Sri Thenandal Films | |
| J U L | 21 | Unakkaga Mattum | Chinni Jayanth | Chinni Jayanth, Adhithya, Poonam, Ramji | CJ Combines | |
| J U L | 28 | Puthira Punithama | Mathrubootham | Nizhalgal Ravi, Vinodhini, Mathrubootham | Tamil Nadu Talkies | |
| A U G | 4 | Kann Thirandhu Paaramma | L. C. Selva | Sangita, Ranjith, Mahanadhi Shankar | United And Company | |
| A U G | 4 | Simmasanam | Eshwar | Vijayakanth, Khushbu, Mantra, Radhika Chowdry | Tamizh Annai Cini Creations | |
| A U G | 4 | Doubles | Pandiarajan | Prabhu Deva, Meena, Pandiarajan, Sangeetha | KRB Productions | |
| A U G | 4 | Independence Day | A. R. Ramesh | Arun Pandian, Roja, Sai Kumar | Saraswathi Film Division | |
| A U G | 11 | Parthen Rasithen | Saran | Prashanth, Simran, Laila, Raghuvaran, Raghava Lawrence | Serene Movie Makers | |
| A U G | 25 | Kannaal Pesavaa | Rajkhanna | Arun Vijay, Suvalakshmi, Goundamani | Sri Raja Rajeshwari Combines | |
| A U G | 25 | Maayi | Surya Prakash | Sarath Kumar, Meena, Suvalakshmi, Vadivelu | Super Good Films | |
| S E P | 1 | Bharathi | Gnana Rajasekaran | Sayaji Shinde, Devayani | Media Dreams | |
| S E P | 1 | Chinna Chinna Kannile | Ameerjan | Prakash Raj, Khushbu, Nassar | Adhi Baghavan Films | |
| S E P | 1 | Krodham 2 | Prem Menon | Prem Menon, Radhika Chowdry, Khushbu | Lotus Film Company | |
| S E P | 1 | Sabhash | K. Subash | Parthiban, Ranjith, Divya Unni | Sri Sudhalakshmi Pictures | |
| S E P | 1 | Unnai Kann Theduthey | Sundar C | Sathyaraj, Khushbu, Ravali | Popular Films | |
| S E P | 8 | Budget Padmanabhan | T. P. Gajendran | Prabhu, Ramya Krishnan, Mumtaj, Karan, Vivek | KRG Movies International | |
| S E P | 8 | Ninaivellam Nee | Jayaram V. Esthava | Livingston, Vignesh, Anju Aravind | Rajkishan Creations | |
| S E P | 15 | Rhythm | Vasanth | Arjun, Meena, Jyothika, Ramesh Aravind | Pyramid Films International | |
| S E P | 22 | Ilaiyavan | T. Babu | Sathyan, Kausalya | Shenbagam Movies | |
| S E P | 22 | Karuvelam Pookkal | Poomani | Nassar, Radhika | National Film Development Corporation | |
| S E P | 22 | Puratchikkaaran | Velu Prabhakaran | Velu Prabhakaran, Sathyaraj, Khushbu, Roja, Arun Pandian | Liberty Creations P. Ltd | |
| S E P | 29 | Uyirile Kalanthathu | K. R. Jaya | Suriya, Jyothika, Raghuvaran | Sri Abayambika Films | |

=== October — December ===
| Opening | | Title | Director | Cast | Studio | Ref |
|---|---|---|---|---|---|---|
| O C T | 26 | Kannukku Kannaga | S.Dayalan | Murali, Devayani, Raja, Vindhya | Pangaj Productions | |
| O C T | 26 | Palayathu Amman | Rama Narayanan | Meena, Ramki, Divya Unni | Sri Thenandal Films | |
| O C T | 26 | Priyamaanavale | K. Selva Bharathy | Vijay, Simran, Radhika Chowdry | Gita Chitra International | |
| O C T | 26 | Thenali | K. S. Ravikumar | Kamal Haasan, Jyothika, Jayaram, Devayani | RK Celluloids | |
| O C T | 26 | Vaanavil | Manoj Kumar | Arjun, Abhirami, Prakash Raj | Guru Films | |
| N O V | 3 | Seenu | P. Vasu | Karthik, Malavika, P. Vasu | Seventh Channel Communications | |
| N O V | 10 | Anbudan | Indra Kumar | Arun Kumar, Rambha, Meena | Twenty First Gallery | |
| N O V | 17 | Vanna Thamizh Pattu | P. Vasu | Prabhu, Vaijayanthi, Mani Chandana | Aishwarya Combines | |
| N O V | 24 | Snegithiye | Priyadarshan | Jyothika, Sharbani Mukherjee, Tabu | Surya Cine Arts | |
| D E C | 1 | En Sakhiye | Ravi Raja | Devaraj, Divya, Prabhu Sekhar | LV Productions | |
| D E C | 8 | Penngal | Raj Marudhu | Jai Akash, Divyasri, Santhana Bharathi | Adhya Global Visions | |
| D E C | 8 | Pottu Amman | K. Rajarathinam | Venu, Roja, Suvalakshmi | Mangala Productions | |
| D E C | 15 | Manasu | Abdul Rahman | Shakti, Oviya, Sanjeev Kumar | Sheela Cini Arts | |
| D E C | 22 | Aval Paavam | M. K. Arundhava Raja | Prabhukanth, Ritika | KR Films | |
| D E C | 22 | Ennavalle | J. Suresh | Madhavan, Sneha | Sri Sai Deva Productions | |
| D E C | 22 | Manu Needhi | Thambi Ramaiah | Murali, Prathyusha, Napoleon | GR Gold Films | |
| D E C | 22 | Nee Enthan Vaanam | R. K. Suresh | Vignesh, Reshma | Sunrise Entertainers | |

Other releases

The following films also released in 2000, though the release date remains unknown.

| Title | Director | Cast | Studio | Ref |
|---|---|---|---|---|
| Kannula Kaasa Kattappa | Kartikeyan | Pandiarajan, Sangeetha, Vadivelu | | |

== Awards ==
| Category/Organization | Cinema Express Awards January 2000 | Dinakaran Cinema Awards 13 February 2000 | Film Fans Association Awards 6 July 2001 | Filmfare Awards South 4 April 2001 | Tamil Nadu State Film Awards |
|---|---|---|---|---|---|
| Best Film | Kandukondain Kandukondain | Vaanathaippola | Bharathi / Vaanathaippola | Kandukondain Kandukondain | Vaanathaippola |
| Best Director | Vikraman; Vaanathaippola | Vikraman; Vaanathaippola | Vikraman; Vaanathaippola | Rajiv Menon; Kandukondain Kandukondain | Vikraman; Vaanathaippola |
| Best Actor | Ajith Kumar; Mugavaree | Vijayakanth; Vaanathaippola | Vijayakanth; Vaanathaippola | Kamal Haasan; Hey Ram | Murali; Kadal Pookkal (2001) |
| Best Actress | Meena; Rhythm & Jyothika; Kushi | Jyothika; Kushi | Devayani / Khushbu; Bharathi / Veeranadai | Jyothika; Kushi | Devayani; Bharathi |
| Best Music Director | Deva; Kushi | S. A. Rajkumar; Vaanathaippola | Deva; Kushi | A. R. Rahman; Alaipayuthey | Deva; Kushi / Sandhitha Velai / Uyirile Kalanthathu |
