= Aval Paavam =

- Directed by: M. K. Arundhava Raja
- Produced by: K. Rajan
- Starring: Prabhukanth; Ritika
- Music by: Pradeep Ravi
- Production company: KR Films
- Release date: 22 December 2000
- Country: India
- Language: Tamil

Aval Paavam (transl. She is unfortunate) is a 2000 Indian Tamil-language drama film directed by M. K. Arundhava Raja. The film stars Prabhukanth and Ritika, with Ishari K. Ganesh playing a supporting role. The film, produced by K. Rajan, was released on 22 December 2000.

== Cast ==
- Prabhukanth as Sriram
- Ritika as Thulasi
- K. Rajan
- J. Lalita
- Mohan Vaidya
- Ishari K. Ganesh

== Production ==
The film marked the feature film debut of director M. K. Arundhava Raja, who had earlier worked on television series. K. Rajan, who had taken on the role of the president of Chennai Distributors Association during 2000, announced that he would produce Aval Paavam on a low budget. Rajan's son, Prabhukanth, acted in his first lead role. He had earlier featured as the antagonist in Doubles (2000), and later worked on Ninaikkatha Naalillai (2001). The lead actress, Lakshmi, took on the stage name of Ritika for the film. She head earlier appeared in a supporting role in Thalaimurai (1998) and shot for Aval Paavam alongside seven other film projects in early 2000. Rajan had also signed the actress on for another project during the period, Babu Ganesh's Kudumbam Oru Koiyil starring Ramki, although the project was later dropped. The film was briefly retitled as Chembaruthi Poove as the team wanted to avoid the title sounding Malayalam, but later reverted to the original title of Aval Paavam.

== Soundtrack ==
The soundtrack was composed by Pradeep Ravi.

Song	Singer(s)	Duration
"Kuyile Poonkuyile"	Prashanna, Harini	4:30
"Ponnanaval"	Unni Menon	4:20
"Nitham Yethanai"	Anuradha Sriram	4:17
"Collegeile Teenageile"	Prashanna, Harini	4:23
"Chembaruthi Poove"	Anuradha Sriram	4:17
"Myalapre Mama"	Sabesh	3:59

== Release and reception ==
The film was released on 22 December 2000 across Tamil Nadu. Malini Mannath of Chennai Online compared the film's theme to K. Balachander's Arangetram (1973), where about a woman takes to prostitution to support her family, but noted that changing times meant that the topic was less of a taboo in Tamil Nadu. The critic praised the film, adding "it is a well-planned screenplay and there is no attempt to preach or make it a melodrama" and that "there is no sexual exploitation of the theme to distract the viewers, though there was enough room for it."
