= Kannathal =

1998 Indian Tamil-language film

Kannathaal
- Directed by: Bharathi Kannan
- Written by: Bharathi Kannan; E. Ramdoss (dialogues)
- Produced by: R. B. Choudary
- Starring: Karan; Neena; Indhu
- Cinematography: Vijay
- Edited by: V. Jaishankar
- Music by: Ilaiyaraaja
- Production company: Super Good Films
- Release date: 2 December 1998
- Running time: 150 minutes
- Country: India
- Language: Tamil

Kannathal is a 1998 Indian Tamil-language devotional film directed by Bharathi Kannan. The film stars Karan, Neena and Indhu, with Manivannan, Vadivelu, Vadivukkarasi, Fathima Babu, and Delhi Ganesh playing supporting roles. It was released on 2 December 1998.

== Plot ==
Khusbu narrates the story of the woman turned village Goddess through her traditional, bow song in a village fair.

Kannatha (Neena) is a villager who performs dances(Karagattam) for her survival and is a staunch believer in Goddess Amman. Many in her village, revere here as a goddess. She lives with her father Shanmugam Pillai (Delhi Ganesh), who is a nadaswaram artist, her mother (Fathima Babu), and her four little sisters.

Chinna Durai (Karan) is the philandering son of a rich Zamindar Mohana Sundaram (Manivannan) and Ranganayaki (Vadivukkarasi). One fine day, Chinna Durai witnesses Kannatha in a Hindu festival and impressed by her looks. He uses subterfuge to marry her by coercing her father into their marriage.

After the marriage, Chinna Durai rapes Kannatha and begins to mistreat the innocent girl. When Shanmugam visits Kannatha, Chinna Durai ridicules him for being poor. Feeling guilty to have destroyed his daughter's life, Shanmugam dies of a broken heart. Kannatha then decides to support her mother and sisters by trying to bring them to live with her in-laws. Mohana Sundaram and Ranganayaki repeatedly humiliate them as much as possible to expel them from their house. In addition to this, Chinna Durai also tries to harasses Kannatha's mother to her shock. Due to this humiliation, Kannatha's mother and the four girls commit suicide by eating poisoned food unbeknownst to Kannatha. Soona Paana (Vadivelu) has a comedy subplot in this story as a menacing villager who steals and gets caught in the action hilariously.

Meanwhile, Kannatha becomes pregnant. Chinna Durai who is now bored of living with her, accuse that Kannatha's baby has cheated on him to have this child. The village president orders Kannatha to perform a ritual on front of Chintala karai Vekkali amman statue to prove her innocence and chastity. Although Kannatha successfully completes the ritual, Chinna Durai, Mohana Sundaram, and Ranganayaki hacks her to death and set her ablaze. They forge evidences to make the police believe this was an accident. Kannatha emerges from the ashes taking the form of a goddess to avenge her death.

Shortly after this, Chinna Durai marries his rich relative Seetha Lakshmi (Indhu), a talkative and naive village girl. Seetha lakshmi worships Karuppusamy and gets to know the cruelty of her husband and in laws. Now Kannatha, in her goddess form kills her in-laws every full moon day. Now pregnant Seetha Lakshmi tries to save her husband from the wrath of goddess begs Karuppusamy's priest. Priest gives her lemons to stick on the trident of the goddess, that are supposed to calm down the goddess.

In the climax, Chinna Durai who is against this practice berates the goddess, argues with his wife and hurts her; This inadvertently makes the lemon fall from the trident. Kannatha appears before Chinna Durai and tries to kill him. He seeks her mercy but sighting his presence would endanger all of womenkind, Kannatha finally slays him. Movies ends with a note that all evil should be destroyed for the betterment of humanity.

== Cast ==
- Karan as Chinna Durai
- Neena as Kannatha
- Indhu as Seetha Lakshmi
- Manivannan as Mohana Sundaram
- Vadivukkarasi as Ranganayaki
- Vadivelu as Soona Paana (Subbaiya Pandiyan)
- Fathima Babu as Kannatha's mother
- Delhi Ganesh as Shanmugam, Kannatha's father
- Halwa Vasu as Vasu
- Thideer Kannaiah as Gopal
- Bharathi Kannan as Babu
- Meesai Murugesan
- Kullamani
- Raj Chander as Babu
- Nellai Siva
- Kovai Senthil
- Chitra Guptan
- Vellai Subbaiah
- Achan
- Vinu Chakravarthy in a guest appearance as Karuppu Sami
- Khushbu in a guest appearance as villupattukari
- Priyanka Robo Shankar in an uncredited role

== Soundtrack ==
The soundtrack was composed by Ilaiyaraaja. He reportedly composed all the songs in a single day.

Song	Singer(s)	Lyrics	Duration
"Amman Pukazhai Paada" (male)	Ilaiyaraaja	Ilaiyaraaja	4:53
"Amman Pukazhai Paada" (female)	Bhavatharini	Ilaiyaraaja	4:53
"Kamatchi Ammanukku"	Sujatha	Ponnadiyan	5:17
"Maalaiveiyazhaki"	Ilaiyaraaja, Chorus	Kamakodiyan	2:42
"Munthi Munthi Vinayagare"	K. S. Chithra	Bharathi Kannan	6:20
"Pathilenkay Solvai"	Sujatha	Arivumathi	4:09
"Unnai Nambum"	Devie Neithiyar, Chorus	Kamakodiyan	2:38

== Reception ==
D. S. Ramanujam of The Hindu opined that "The old fashioned approach of director S. Bharathikannan, based on his story and screenplay, may go well with rural audience, particularly womenfolk".
