= Tappu Chesi Pappu Koodu =

2002 telugu film by A. Kodandarami Reddy

- DVD cover
- Directed by: A. Kodandarami Reddy
- Screenplay by: A. Kodandarami Reddy
- Based on: Kakkakuyil by Priyadarshan
- Produced by: Mohan Babu
- Starring: Mohan Babu; Srikanth; Gracy Singh; Sujatha; Radhika Chaudhari
- Cinematography: V. Jayaram
- Edited by: Gautham Raju
- Music by: M. M. Keeravani
- Production company: Sree Lakshmi Prasanna Pictures
- Release date: 22 May 2002
- Country: India
- Language: Telugu

Tappu Chesi Pappu Koodu (transl. Earning by foul methods) (Note: Literally "eating dal (eating well) through bad deeds", playing off of the famous Telugu idiom Appu Chesi Pappu Koodu (possibly a specific reference to the 1959 film of the same name), which translates to "eating well through debt".) is a 2002 Indian Telugu-language comedy film written and directed by A. Kodandarami Reddy and produced by Mohan Babu under Sree Lakshmi Prasanna Pictures. The film stars Mohan Babu, Srikanth, Gracy Singh, Sujatha and Radhika Chaudhari. It is a remake of Priyadarshan's 2001 Malayalam film Kakkakuyil, which is in turn based on A Fish Called Wanda.

The film's score and soundtrack is composed by M. M. Keeravani. Tappu Chesi Pappu Koodu released on 22 May 2002.

== Plot ==
Sivaji is an unemployed person who is in a dire need of money for his mother's medical treatment. Lying to his family that he is leaving for the United States, Sivaji arrives in Mumbai instead to find a job. However, he loses his luggage immediately after arriving in the city but finds Ramesh, his old friend who makes a living by cheating people.

With no option left, Sivaji joins Ramesh in the cheating business to make easy money. Together with Pedda Koteswara Rao and Cheecha, the gang carries out a bank robbery. Planning to steal the entire share of the money, Cheecha anonymously informs the police about the robbery. She informs that it was Koteswara Rao who carried out the entire plan. Before being arrested, Koteswara Rao puts all the money in the locker of another bank and nobody has any idea about where the money is hidden.

Meanwhile, a blind old couple, Zamindar Bhupati (also called Raju) and his wife are rich Telugus living in Mumbai. Their son and daughter-in-law are deceased and they lost their eyesight due to an accident. Their grandson Bujji is studying in the United States but they have not seen him in several years. The old couple takes the help of a paan seller to read any letters they receive. One day, they get a telegram. Because the paan seller cannot read English, they ask Ramesh to read out for them. While it is written that Bujji would visit Mumbai after six months, Ramesh senses an opportunity in it and tells them that Bujji would be arriving the following day.

Ramesh introduces Sivaji as Bujji to the old couple in order to take cover from the police. The old couple has the ability to remember the voice and touch of any person they meet. As things turn out, they register Ramesh's body and Sivaji's voice as Bujji. While this is going on, they happen to tell that Bujji has a girlfriend in the US. Much to their astonishment, Radhika Rani arrives at their house and introduces herself as Bujji's girlfriend. She acts as an impediment to the plans of Ramesh and Sivaji. When Radhika Rani realizes that Ramesh and Sivaji are not actually cheating the old couple for money, she reveals to them that Bujji has died in an accident back in the states and she had come to Mumbai to deliver the news of Bujji's death to Raju. As the couple seemed happy and cheerful while seeing Bujji in Ramesh and Sivaji, she decided not to tell the truth and tag along.

Ramesh, however, gets desperate for money. He steals a valuable idol from the old couple's house and decides to sell it. Sivaji confronts Ramesh about the same but he leaves angrily. When a guilty Sivaji confesses the same to Raju, he requests them to continue the drama as his wife would not digest that her grandson has died. Raju's wife arrives calling for Bujji and Ramesh arrives just in time after feeling remorse over his actions. Feeling elated, Raju hugs Ramesh and Sivaji affectionately.

== Cast ==
- Mohan Babu as Sivaji
- Srikanth as Kappaganthula Ramesh
- Gracy Singh as Radhika Rani
- Sujatha as Zamindar Bhupati's wife
- Radhika Chaudhari as Cheecha
- M. Balayya as Zamindar Bhupati alias Raju
- Kota Srinivasa Rao as Pedda Koteswara Rao
- Ali as Koteswara Rao's brother
- Mallikarjuna Rao
- Brahmanandam
- Tanikella Bharani
- Gundu Hanumantha Rao
- L. B. Sriram
- Ramya Sri
- Dharmavarapu Subramanyam
- Telangana Shakuntala
- M. S. Narayana
- Gautam Raju
- Annapurna as Sivaji's mother
- Chalapathi Rao
- Brahmaji
- Sudhakar
- Uttej
- Ananth Babu
- Baby Navya
- Master Vamsi

== Soundtrack ==
The soundtrack album consists of five singles composed by M. M. Keeravani.

Tappu Chesi Pappu Koodu (Original Motion Picture Soundtrack)
No.	Title	Lyrics	Singer(s)	Length
1.	"Brundavanamali"	Jonnavittula Ramalingeswara Rao	K. J. Yesudas, K. S. Chitra	4:57
2.	"Intannadantannade Gangaraju"	Kulasekhar	Mohan Babu, Nithya Santoshini	4:20
3.	"Govinda Govinda"	Chirravuri Vijaykumar	M.M. Keeravani, Sujatha Mohan	4:10
4.	"Vaana Kodtandi"	Guru Charan	Udit Narayan, K. S. Chitra	4:37
5.	"Yaa Alla Hare Krishna"	Bhuvana Chandra	Udit Narayan	5:03
Total length:				23:07

== Reception ==
In his review for Zamin Ryot, Griddaluru Gopalrao opined that Kodandarami Reddy had succeeded in creating an entertaining film, though the humour felt too slap stick at times. Reviewing the performances, Gudipoodi Srihari of The Hindu wrote, "Mohanbabu and Srikanth set themselves well in the roles. Gracy singh makes her presence interesting towards the end of the film. Balayya and Sujata live in their roles." On the technical front, he stated that Keeravani's music and Jayaram's cinematography "accentuate the dramatic impact of the film." A reviewer from Sify, who rated the film 3/5, wrote: "The film sags due to its weak script and buffoonery passing off as a comedy." Andhra Today wrote "This may perhaps add to the string of flops Mohan Babu and Srikanth have been adding to their credit.Lack of substance in the story, unimaginative screen-play take its toll on the movie.Kodanda Rami Reddy's direction after a long gap doesn't seem to be in tune with the times.A story that should have been driven by humor is totally devoid of it, and sometimes even defy logic". Telugucinema.com wrote "In an effort to make an out and out comedy all the characters starting from heroes to villains were reduced to mere comic figures and story got last in the endless series of trivial scenes".
