= Ashoka (2008 film) =

- DVD cover
- Directed by: Prem
- Written by: Prem
- Produced by: Indira Prem
- Starring: Prem; Anushree; Pooja Bharathi; Raghuvaran; Rajeev; Anandaraj
- Cinematography: Om Prakash
- Music by: Sabesh–Murali
- Production company: Lotus Film Company
- Release date: 1 February 2008
- Running time: 132 minutes
- Country: India
- Language: Tamil

Ashoka is a 2008 Indian Tamil-language action thriller film written and directed by NRI, Prem, who also stars in the lead role with Anushree, Pooja Bharathi, Raghuvaran, Rajeev and Anandaraj in supporting roles. The film revolves around the life of a protector, who guards the Prime Minister of India. The film was produced by Prem's wife Indira under Lotus Film Company.

== Plot ==
Prem Menon plays a Black Cat commando chief Ashoka looking after the security of the Prime Minister of the country. The film begins with Ashoka barely managing to save the life of the PM at the Coimbatore airport from a terrorist ambush.

Ashoka saves the PM, as the doctor later says, "The PM has survived, as he has his heart on the right side which is a rare phenomenon!" The rest of the film is about how Ashoka foils more terrorist attempts on the PM's life as he is recovering at the hospital.

== Cast ==
- Prem as Ashoka
- Anushree
- Pooja Bharathi
- Raghuvaran as Huzoor
- Rajeev as Doctor
- Anandaraj as Chandramohan
- Uma Padmanabhan
- Livingston
- Naveen

== Production ==
The film began production in June 2004, and was made over four years. The film featured no songs or a separate comedy track, and won media recognition for being a rare Tamil film during the period to have neither of those elements.

== Reception ==
Sify wrote, "Unfortunately Ashoka is not a great experience and drags." Kanika of Kalki praised Raghuvaran's acting and cinematography but panned the music and antagonists providing unintentional humour but felt the screenplay was dull and that story, lacking substance, hangs in limbo. She concluded saying Prem could have shown the importance given to the hero in the direction as well.
