= Ramudochadu =

1996 film by A. Kodandarami Reddy

- Theatrical release poster
- Directed by: A. Kodandarami Reddy
- Written by: Thotapalli Madhu (dialogues)
- Screenplay by: A. Kodanadarami Reddy
- Story by: Thotapalli Madhu
- Produced by: Yarlagadda Surendra
- Starring: Nagarjuna; Krishna; Soundarya; Ravali
- Cinematography: Rasool Ellore
- Edited by: Shankar Suri
- Music by: Raj
- Production company: S. S. Creations
- Release date: 25 April 1996
- Running time: 147 minutes
- Country: India
- Language: Telugu

Ramudochadu (transl. Ramu has come) is a 1996 Indian Telugu-language drama film directed by A. Kodandarami Reddy and produced by Yarlagadda Surendra. It stars Nagarjuna, Krishna, Soundarya and Ravali, with music composed by Raj. It was dubbed into Tamil under the title Waarisu.

== Plot ==
The rivalry between two families splits a village "Seetaramapuram" into Seetapuram and Ramapuram. Seetapuram's head is Bhusayya and Ramapuram's head is Bhadrayya. Bhusayya is in the trap of his son-in-law Gavaraju, who always insists on taking revenge against Bhadrayya's family. Bhadrayya wants his granddaughter Sundaralakshmi to study in college, but her father Chandrayya fixes her marriage with their Village President Nagaraju, but with his father's pressure, Chandrayya sends Sundaralakshmi to college.

Ram is a college student from America who one day meets Sundaralakshmi in college, and as she isn't used to city life, Ram teaches her how to live that way. Afterwards, he goes with Sundaralakshmi to Seetapuram to spend his holidays and meets her family. But Chandrayya doesn't appreciate Ram's foreign behaviour. Ram beats up one of the goons from Ramapuram as they start another fight. But Ram stops them luckily and admits that he's the one who beat the guy up, so they stopped the fight. Ram meets a village girl named Seshagiri and she falls in love with him, with the help of her, Ram tries to seduce Sundaralakshmi. Chandrayya makes Sundaralakshmi's engagement arrangements with Nagaraju, where she admits her love with Ram. But Chandrayya doesn't agree, he keeps a challenge to Ram that he should cultivate the agriculture land of 100 acres. Ram accepts the challenge and wins it.

Meanwhile, Ram discovers that Nagaraju secretly works for Gavaraju, they plan their next attack at their rival village. Ram then comes in and starts a fight against both villages in which Bhusayya's wife Annapurnamma is injured, Ram saves her and tells her that he is her grandson, Gavaraju listens to that and kills Annapurnamma and proclaims that if any heir is there in the village to give a funeral to her, then Ram should admit the secret.

Krishna Prasad, son of Bhusayya is treated as god by the entire village, because he doesn't have any disparity of rich and poor. He is loving and marries Bhadrayya's daughter Arundathi without their permission, for that reason his father sends him out. After some time, Arundhati gets pregnant, Krishna Prasad is willing to send his wife to America for higher education. Gavaraju plans to kill Krishna Prasad and Arundathi and in the attack, Krishna Prasad dies saving Arundathi, but people think both of them die, which splits the village into two and the temple between the village is closed.

Ram is the son of Krishna Prasad and Arundathi, that's why he played this entire game to join both villages as his mother's last wish. Meanwhile, Bhusayya also owns up to the truth and he changes. Finally, Ram sees the end of Gavaraju, joins both villages into "Seetaramapuram" and the temple is re-opened with Ram and Sundaralakshmi's marriage.

== Cast ==
- Nagarjuna as Ram
- Soundarya as Sundarlakshmi
- Ravali as Seshagiri
- Krishna as Krishna Prasad (Cameo Appearance)
- Suhasini as Arundathi (Cameo Appearance)
- Satyanarayana as Bhadrayya
- Srihari as Nagaraju
- Nambiar as Bhusayya
- Anand Raj as Gavaraju
- Chandramohan as Chandrayya
- Chalapathi Rao as Servant
- Jayanthi as Annapurnamma
- Sudha as Venkai
- Y. Vijaya as Bhadrayya's wife
- Prasad Babu as Madhavayya
- Ali as Basha
- AVS as Principal
- Babu Mohan as Bengal
- Mallikarjuna Rao as Chandamama
- Krishnaveni as Warden
- Poojitha as Nagma
- Kashmera Shah as special appearance in an item song
- Master Harsha as Ankappa

== Production ==
The film was partially shot in Gobichettipalayam.

== Music ==
Ramudochadu

Film score by Raj
- Released: 1996
- Genre: Soundtrack
- Length: 28:48
- Label: Supreme Music
- Producer: Raj

Raj chronology
Bharatha Simham (1995)	Ramudochadu (1996)	Sambhavam (1998)

The music was composed by Raj. Audio soundtrack was released on Supreme Music label.

No.	Title	Lyrics	Singer(s)	Length
1.	"Aishwarya Raiyo"	Sirivennela Sitaramasastri	S. P. Balasubrahmanyam, Suresh Peters	4:48
2.	"Varava Vayarama"	Veturi	S. P. Balasubrahmanyam, Chitra	5:04
3.	"Guvve Kuse"	Veturi	S. P. Balasubrahmanyam, Chitra	5:14
4.	"Maa Palle"	Veturi	S. P. Balasubrahmanyam, Chitra	4:53
5.	"Srungara Kavya"	Sirivennela Sitaramasastri	S. P. Balasubrahmanyam, Swarnalatha	3:31
6.	"Gumma Gumma"	Veturi	S. P. Balasubrahmanyam, Chitra	5:18
Total length:				28:48
