= Varraar Sandiyar =

- Poster
- Directed by: N. K. Viswanathan
- Written by: Meenakshi Sundaram (dialogue)
- Screenplay by: N. K. Viswanathan
- Story by: Sree Rajakaliamman Cine Arts
- Produced by: Tharangai V. Sundar; Tharangai V. Chandrasekaran
- Starring: Prem; Khushbu
- Cinematography: N. K. Viswanathan
- Edited by: V. Uthaya Sankaran
- Music by: Deva
- Production company: Sree Rajakaliamman Cine Arts
- Release date: 14 December 1995
- Running time: 135 minutes
- Country: India
- Language: Tamil

Varraar Sandiyar (also spelled Varraar Chandiyar) (transl. Rogue is coming) is a 1995 Indian Tamil-language action drama film directed by N. K. Viswanathan. The film stars Prem and Khushbu, with Jaishankar, Anandaraj, K. R. Vijaya, Gandhimathi, Senthil, Vennira Aadai Moorthy, Charle and T. K. S. Chandran playing supporting roles. It was released on 14 December 1995.

== Plot ==
Sathyamoorthy is a cruel gram panchayat chief who gives unfair judgements and spreads terror among the villagers, he never misses an opportunity to whip the innocent villagers. So the villagers gave him the name of Sandiyar (brute). The villagers want Sandiyar to die while his mother Annapoorni wants him to become a good man. Sandiyar then befriends the crook Maruthu who saved his life from the villagers.

One day, the outspoken Meena arrives in Sandiyar's village and claims Sandiyar had earlier secretly married her but Sandiyar says at the village court that nothing happened between them. Meena wants to marry Sandiyar in front of the villagers and she starts to compel him in many ways. Sandiyar's mother Annapoorni strongly supports her and brings her to their home. Sandiyar finally marries her. After the wedding, Meena reveals to Sandiyar the reason behind her lie. In the past, at the village court, Sandiyar gave an unfair judgement which led her sister and mother to commit suicide.

Meena learns that Sandiyar also has a tragic past. His father (Jaishankar) was brutally killed by a family friend, Mookaiah, for acquiring his land and the villagers did nothing to prevent it. Sandiyar cannot forget that sad day, so he makes the life of the villagers a living hell. So far, Meena wanted to take revenge on him but now Meena tries to change him into a responsible village president. Afterwards, Sandiyar slowly falls under the spell of his wife Meena and he becomes a good person. Maruthu is none other than Mookaiah's son and he is urged to take all the wealth of Sandiyar. What transpires next forms the rest of the story.

== Cast ==
- Prem as Sathyamoorthy (Sandiyar)
- Khushbu as Meena
- Jaishankar in a guest appearance as Sandiyar's father
- Anandaraj as Maruthu
- K. R. Vijaya as Annapoorni
- Gandhimathi as Shanmugasundari
- Senthil as Sembattai
- Vennira Aadai Moorthy as Accountant
- Charle
- T. K. S. Chandran as Mookaiah
- Oru Viral Krishna Rao as Doctor
- Kullamani
- Krishnamoorthy as Police Officer
- A. O. K. Sundar
- T. K. S. Natarajan as Kanakku Pillai
- Karuppu Subbiah
- Premi as Meena's mother
- Vinayak Raj
- Chitra Guptan
- Ram as Henchman
- Lakshman as Henchman

== Soundtrack ==
The soundtrack were composed by Deva.

Song	Singer(s)	Lyrics	Duration
"Amman Kovil Gopurattil"	Deva	Piraisoodan	2:35
"Vaigaiyinu Solliputten"	K. S. Chithra	Piraisoodan	5:00
"Chandirane Saatchi"	Mano	Piraisoodan	5:00
"Dindukallu"	Anuradha Sriram	Ponniyin Selvan	2:43
"Vandu Piranthathu"	Mano, Bhuvana Venkatesh	Piraisoodan	4:45
"Vaanum Pozhiyanum"	T. L. Maharajan, Chorus	Piraisoodan	3:58

== Release and reception ==
Despite having a similar name to the former title of Virumaandi (2004), Sandiyar, the film reportedly had a smooth release, generating no controversy.

D. S. Ramanujam of The Hindu wrote, "Cameraman-cum-director, N. K. Viswanathan, who has also penned the screenplay, manages to keep a fair tempo mixing the comedy of Senthil, the 'bad luck' man (like Lil Abner's Calamity Jones whenever he is around misfortune strikes the people nearby) with the main drama depicted in flash cuts". The film was also reviewed by Cinema Express.
