= K. Atchi Reddy =

Indian film producer

- Born: Aravalli, West Godavari district, Andhra Pradesh, India
- Occupation: Film producer
- Parents: Satyanarayana Reddy (father); Venkataratnam (mother)

K Atchi Reddy is an Indian film producer in the Telugu film industry.

== Filmography ==
=== As a producer ===
- Surya The Great (1990)
- Dharyaptu (1990)
- Kobbari Bondam (1991)
- Rajendrudu Gajendrudu (1993)
- Mayalodu (1993)
- Yamaleela (1994)
- Ghatotkachudu (1995)
- Vinodam (1996)
- Gun Shot (1996)
- Ugadi (1997)
- Deergha Sumangali Bhava (1998)
- Abhishekam (1998)
- Athdey Oka Sainyam (2004)
- Prema Kavali (2011)
- Pula Rangadu (2012)
- Autonagar Surya (2014)

=== As a presenter ===
- Maayajaalam (2006)
- Samanyudu (2006)
- Bahumati (2007)
- Police Story 2 (Telugu) (2007)
- Victory (2008)
- Kick (2009)
- Don Seenu (2010)
- Damarukam (2012)

== Awards ==
- He won Nandi Award for Best Home - Viewing Feature Film - Mayalodu (1993)
