= Anbu Thollai =

- Directed by: Hayaath
- Starring: Pandiarajan; Ravali; Chinni Jayanth
- Music by: Soundaryan
- Release date: 14 February 2003
- Country: India
- Language: Tamil

Anbu Thollai (transl. Love Torture) is an Indian Tamil-language film written and directed by Hayath. The film, starring Pandiarajan, Ravali and Chinni Jayanth in leading roles, was released on 14 February 2003.

== Cast ==
- Pandiarajan as Singamuthu
- Ravali as Chinnathayi
- Chinni Jayanth
- R. Sundarrajan as Devarajan
- Gandhimathi
- Vinu Chakravarthy
- Balu Anand
- Shakeela as Padmini
- Gowthami Vembunathan

== Soundtrack ==
.

- "Mundaasukatti" - Srinivas, Srivardhini
- "Kalyanam Unakenna" - Manikka Vinayagam, Nirmala
- "Adicha Adikkanum" - Swarnalatha

== Release ==
The film opened to poor reviews.
