= Prem Menon (actor) =

Indian businessman, actor and director

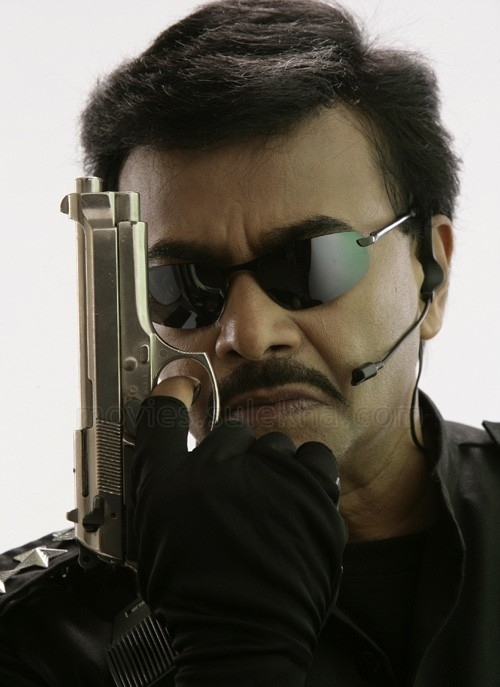
- Born: 15 October 1953 (age 72); Kuwait
- Occupations: Actor, director, screenwriter
- Years active: 1982 – 2008
- Spouse: Indra
- Children: 2

Prem Menon (born 15 October 1953) is an Indian businessman, former actor, screenwriter, and director, who has appeared in Tamil films. He became known with his role in the film Krodham (1982) and has since regularly produced and made his own projects.

== Career ==
Prem Kumar Menon is the son of entrepreneur K. T. B. Menon, who had vast business interests and investments in Kuwait. Prem Menon heads company Laksola, which produces insulating materials, and his financial success prompted him to pursue other interests in Tamil films. He has subsequently worked in the film industry as an actor director, screenwriter and producer, specialising in making action-thriller films. He made a breakthrough in films by producing and starring in A. Jagannathan's Krodham (1982), before helming and playing the lead role in a series of action films in the early 1990s including Vetri Karangal (1991) and Veeramani (1994). In 2000, Prem directed and featured in a sequel to Krodham titled Krodham 2, winning mixed reviews for his work. An action-thriller, the film featured Prem alongside Radhika Chaudhari and Khushbu, a critic wrote "the action tapers into melodrama and tedium".

He made a comeback by writing, directing and producing the thriller film Ashoka (2008) portraying a security guard, and it garnered average reviews and had a low key release at the box office. The film featured no songs or a separate comedy track, and won media recognition for being a rare Tamil film during the period to have neither of those elements. Prem then began work on Vazhipokkan, a village-centric action film, in 2009 but the film was eventually shelved.

== Filmography ==
Year	Film	Role	Notes
1982	Krodham	Prem	Also storywriter
1983	En Aasai Unnoduthan		
1991	Vetri Karangal	Anand	Also storywriter
1993	Pudhu Piravi	Parthiban	Also director
1994	Veeramani	Veeramani	Also director
1995	Varraar Sandiyar	Sathyamoorthy (Sandiyar)	
1996	Andha Naal	SP Vikramadithyan	
2000	Krodham 2	Dheeran	Also director
2008	Ashoka	Ashoka	Also director
