= Abhishekam (film) =

- Release poster
- Directed by: S. V. Krishna Reddy
- Written by: Posani Krishna Murali
- Screenplay by: S. V. Krishna Reddy
- Story by: S. V. Krishna Reddy
- Produced by: K. Atchi Reddy; Kishore Rathi (presents)
- Starring: S. V. Krishna Reddy; Rachana
- Music by: S. V. Krishna Reddy
- Production company: Manisha Films
- Release date: 10 December 1998
- Country: India
- Language: Telugu

Abhishekam is 1998 Telugu-language drama film written and directed by S. V. Krishna Reddy starring himself along with Rachana and Radhika. This film is based on the mother sentiment. S. V. Krishna Reddy played dual role as a rich man who fights with cancer and also a middle class employee who struggles to make ends meet. The film was released to negative reviews and became a box office failure.

== Plot ==
Vijay alias Vijji (S. V. Krishna Reddy) is the only son of rich parents. His father suddenly dies because of an unknown reason. Unable to digest the death of her husband, his mother becomes mentally upset. She is treated by the psychologist (Narra Venkateswara Rao), but Vijji want to take her to their home with the permission of the doctor. He takes care of her very well till she is sane again. Vijji is grown up to be a musician and gains a lot of popularity. He advocates the love for his mother in songs also. His mother also reciprocates the same love for him. Ali, Uttej, Venu (Venu Madhav), Sivaji (Sivaji Raja) and Sudhakar (Sudhakar) are in his music troupe.

They get a chance to perform at Singapore on the request of G. K. Naidu (Tanikella Bharani), the president of Singapore Telugu Association. Sireesha, daughter of G. K. plays pranks on them at the hotel. When she does the same for the second time, they find out that she is the daughter of G. K. Naidu, and is very playful practical joker. When she takes him to a restaurant and asks him to kiss her, Vijji scolds her to behave properly. Her father also asks her to apologize to him. She apologizes to him and also expresses her love. Vijji initially thinks that it is also a prank, but later realizes that it is true love. Her father reveals that she was a classmate of Vijji in his childhood, and she has admired him from the beginning.

From his childhood, Vijji gets a strange dream in which he is chased away by some armed men. He gets very upset and frustrated whenever he gets such a dream. Once while Vijji and Sireesha are coming from a party, they are attacked by robbers. They attack Vijay and run away. He is admitted to the hospital. The doctors find something suspicious when they examine his blood, and talk to his family doctor in India. The doctors reveal to his friends that Vijay has a rare incurable fatal disease which is inherited from his ancestors. His friends gets very distressed on hearing this news. They try to hide this news, but he surprises them that he already knew his fate and his only worry is about his mother. He asks his friends not to reveal it to G. K. Naidu and Sireesha as he wouldn't like Sireesha to face the same fate as his mother, who suffered her husband's loss for 12 long years.

Once Sudhakar happen to see a look-alike of Vijay by name Sambaiah, the lone bread winner for their family. His income is very low, but all his family members keep pestering him for their selfish motives. His mother keeps asking him to take her to a big hospital for a health checkup. His brother (Srihari) keep asking for money to start his own business. His wife Surabhi (Rachana) nags him with her petty issues. His sister wants him to get her married with a family who strictly wants dowry. After witnessing all these, Vijay wants get him out of all his troubles. When he is gone to office, Vijay goes to their home and satisfies all their needs.

When Vijay asks Sambaiah to replace him as the son of his mother, he rejects it. His family members are also not ready to send him with Vijay. At last, Vijay convinces all of them by showing great love for his mother, they finally agree to send him. Vijay leaves Sambaiah to replace himself, he also arranges for Surabhi to stay with him. He dies, content that his mother would be happy.

== Cast ==
- S. V. Krishna Reddy as Vijay and Sambaiah (dual role)
- Rachana as Surabhi
- Radhika as Vijay's mother
- Srihari as Sambaiah's elder brother
- Tanikella Bharani as G. K. Naidu
- Sudhakar as Sudhakar
- Sivaji Raja as Sivaji
- Uttej as Uttej
- Ali as Ali
- Venu Madhav as Venu
- Dubbing Janaki as Sambaiah's mother
- Rajitha as Sambaiah's sister-in-law
- Narra Venkateswara Rao as Psychologist
- Vijay Deverakonda as Cameo

== Production ==
Initially, debutante actress Mayoori from Tirupati was supposed to star in the film. Important parts of the film were shot in Singapore. The entire film was recorded using the DTS sound system.

== Soundtrack ==
Music for this film was composed by S.V. Krishna Reddy. The songs were sung by Udit Narayan, Sonu Nigam, P. Unnikrishnan, and Mano.

1. "Jayam Nide Yaro"
2. "Kannepilla"
3. "Naalo Ninnu"
4. "Singapore Jumbo Jet"
5. "Surabhi"
6. "Sogasulu"

== Reception ==
Griddaluru Gopalrao of Zamin Ryot criticised several aspects of the film including story, screenplay, direction, S. V. Krishna Reddy's acting (which the reviewer felt that he was unable to prove himself in the film Ugadi and in this film, he plays dual roles). The reviewer added that Posani Krishna Murali's dialogues became dull to the lack of strength in the film's narration.
