= Mard (1998 film) =

1998 film by Mithun Chakraborty

- Audio Cassette Cover
- Directed by: Ganpati Bohra
- Story by: Ganpati Bohra
- Produced by: Sunil Kumar Bohra
- Starring: Mithun Chakraborty; Ravali; Kader Khan; Gulshan Grover; Raza Murad; Shakti Kapoor; Ravali
- Cinematography: Ramakrishna
- Edited by: Deepak Kapoor
- Music by: Dilip Sen-Sameer Sen
- Production company: Roopavati Pictures
- Release date: 15 May 1998
- Running time: 135 min
- Language: Hindi

Mard is a 1998 Indian Hindi-language Indian action film directed by Ganpati Bohra and produced by Sunil Kumar Bohra, starring Mithun Chakraborty, Kader Khan, Gulshan Grover, Raza Murad, Shakti Kapoor and Ravali. Mard was a hit as it was profitable for both the Producers and the distributors. Mithun delivered another brilliant performance in the movie and proved that why his movies worked despite being low budget.

== Plot ==
Mard is an action film starring Mithun Chakraborty. Assistant Commissioner Of Police Arjun (Mithun Chakraborty) is an honest police officer who gets transferred regularly. As a punishment for his impeccable integrity Arjun is sent to a police station which is a part of the area ruled by underworld don Satya Lal (Gulshan Grover). Satyalal has the local Police and the Home ministry Deen Dayal Chaudhary (Pramod Moutho) under his control and wants to cut ACP Arjun to size. Will Arjun be able to stand up against the odds and defeat Satyalal.

== Cast ==
- Mithun Chakraborty as ACP Arjun Khanna
- Ravali as Kammo
- Kader Khan as Gulam Kalim Azat
- Adi Irani as Abdul Kalim Azat
- Gulshan Grover as Satya Lal
- Raza Murad as DGP Prithvi
- Shakti Kapoor as Jaffer
- Johnny Lever as Bindas
- Lekha Govil as Bindas's Mother
- Pramod Moutho as Chief Minister Dayal Chaudhary
- Tej Sapru as Police Inspector Akash Sinha
- Jack Gaud as Ratan
- Vishwajeet Pradhan as Sohan Lal
- Altaf Raja as singer in song "Peelo Ishq Di Whisky"
- Ashwin Kaushal as Mohan Lal
- Ashalata Kashmiri
- Asha Sharma as victim girl's
- Mitran
- Ram-Laxman
- Amrish

== Music ==
1. "Peelo Ishq Di Whisky" - Altaf Raja
2. "Dil Dhadak Mera Jaaye Re" - Poornima, Lalit Sen
3. "Aaj Kisiki Jeet Hui" - Kavita Krishnamurthy, Mohammed Aziz
4. "Ankhon Mein Hai Kya" - Kumar Sanu, Alka Yagnik
5. "Tu Apna Kaam Karle" - Sapna Awasthi, Devang Patel
