= Vaddu Bava Thappu =

- VCD Cover
- Directed by: K. Ajay Kumar
- Written by: Madhukuri Raja (dialogues)
- Screenplay by: K. Ajay Kumar
- Story by: C.Kalyan; Ramani
- Based on: Kiss Bai Kiss (1988)
- Produced by: P. Purshothama Rao; C.Kalyan (Presents)
- Starring: Rajendra Prasad; Ravali; Indraja
- Cinematography: Lok Singh
- Edited by: K. Ramesh
- Music by: Vidyasagar
- Production company: Sri Ammulya Art Productions
- Release date: 15 June 1995
- Running time: 135 mins
- Country: India
- Language: Telugu

Vaddu Bava Thappu (transl. No, Brother-in-law, it's Wrong) is a 1994 Indian Telugu-language comedy film produced by P. Purshothama Rao and C. Kalyan under the Sri Ammulya Art Productions banner and directed by K. Ajay Kumar. It stars Rajendra Prasad, Ravali, Indraja with music composed by Vidyasagar. The film is a remake of the Marathi film Kiss Bai Kiss (1988). The film was recorded as a flop at the box office.

== Cast ==
- Rajendra Prasad as Raja
- Ravali as Manju
- Indraja as Priya
- Raj Kumar as Satish
- A.V.S. as Simhachalam
- Babu Mohan as Beggar King
- Sivaji Raja as Simhachalam's brother-in-law
- Nagaraju as Shankar
- Gundu Hanumantha Rao
- Chitti Babu
- Ironleg Sastri
- Madhu Sri
- Y. Vijaya as Simhachalam's wife

== Soundtrack ==
Vaddu Bava Thappu

Film score by Vidyasagar
- Released: 1995
- Genre: Soundtrack
- Length: 19:26
- Label: Supreme Music
- Producer: Vidyasagar

Vidyasagar chronology
Simha Garjana (1995)	Vaddu Bava Thappu (1995)	Vetagadu (1995)

Music composed by Vidyasagar. Music released on Supreme Music Company.

No.	Title	Lyrics	Singer(s)	Length
1.	"My Dear Maradaluji"	Sirivennela Sitarama Sastry	Mano, Sujatha	3:54
2.	"Pidata Midha Pidata"	Sai Sriharsha	Vandemataram Srinivas, S. P. Sailaja	3:44
3.	"O Prema Sastri"	Bhuvana Chandra	Mano, Sindhu	4:10
4.	"Hello Hello Sreevaru"	Sirivennela Sitarama Sastry	Vandemataram Srinivas, Chitra	3:39
5.	"Orayyo Yo Yo"	Sahithi	Mano, Swarnalatha	3:59
Total length:				19:26

== Other ==
- VCDs and DVDs on - SHALIMAR Video Company, Hyderabad
