= Krodham =

- Poster
- Directed by: A. Jagannathan
- Written by: K. Ranga Rajan (dialogue)
- Screenplay by: Manivannan; R. Sundarrajan
- Story by: Prem
- Produced by: Indra Laxmanan
- Starring: Prem; Rani Padmini; S. A. Ashokan
- Cinematography: J. Williams
- Edited by: R. Devarajan
- Music by: Shankar–Ganesh
- Production company: A Lotus Film Company
- Release date: 14 January 1982
- Country: India
- Language: Tamil

Krodham (transl. Fury) is 1982 Indian Tamil-language crime thriller film, directed by A. Jagannathan. The screenplay and story were written by Prem and dialogue written by K. Rangarajan respectively. Music was by Shankar–Ganesh. The film stars Prem, Rani Padmini and S. A. Ashokan. Inspired by the American film Death Wish (1974), it revolves around a man who becomes a ruthless vigilante after his wife is murdered by street punks, after which he randomly goes out and kills would-be muggers on the streets after dark. In 2000, Prem Menon acted and directed the sequel to this film Krodham 2.

== Plot ==
Prem is an architect living in Madras with his wife Indhu and sister Subha and her husband Siva. The film begins with scenes of a recent outing Prem and their family and had taken to a restaurant. One day, Indhu and Subha are followed from a shopping mall by two thugs who invade the house posing as delivery men. They fatally injure Indhu and sexually assault Subha.

After his wife's funeral in Madras and shortly following his return to work. Prem's boss gives him an extended business vacation, and he flies to Mysore district, Karnataka to meet a client, Kavitha, and his father. While working in the Mysore district, Prem witnesses a mock gunfight at Mysore, a reconstructed western frontier town used as a movie set. A few days later, while he is working late at the office, Prem is invited to dinner by Kavitha's father at his gun club. At the gun club, Kavitha's father is impressed when Prem shoots with accuracy at the targets. Prem had been taught to handle firearms at a young age by his father, who was a hunter, but after his father was killed in a hunting accident, Prem decided to swear on his mother never to use guns again. After Prem makes improvements to Kavitha's father's plans for a residential development, a thoroughly pleased Kavitha drives Prem back to the Mysore district airport with a gift, which he places into Prem's checked luggage.

Back in Madras city, Prem learns from Siva that his sister is severely depressed from the trauma of the assault. Prem visits his sister, who is now catatonic, at the hospital. Heartbroken, Prem and his brother-in-law have his sister committed to a mental hospital in Brooklyn, United States for intensive treatment. Late upon his return to Madras city, he opens his suitcase and discovers that Kavitha's father's gift was a nickel-plated .32 Colt Police positive revolver, places it into his overcoat, and takes a late night stroll. Prem encounters a mugger, an ex-convict, who attempts to rob two women at knife-point. Prem shoots the mugger with the revolver Kavitha's father had given him.

Shocked that he just killed a human being, Prem runs home and throws up. But motivated by his desire for revenge, he continues to walk the city streets at night, looking for violent criminals. The following night, Prem deliberately walks through the city in order to invite an attack. He guns down three muggers who are robbing a defenceless old man in an alley. A few nights later, two muggers see Prem on a subway. They attempt to rob him at knife-point, but Prem shoots them both with his revolver.

On another night, Prem sits as bait in a sleazy restaurant coffee shop surrounded by prostitutes and assorted street people. He pays his bill to the cashier, purposely revealing a wallet full of cash. He leaves, followed by two thugs, who have taken the bait. Yet again, a robbery attempt is made. Prem shoots one, but the other manages to stab him in his shoulder. As a wounded Prem stumbles off, the one who stabbed him runs away, but he is mortally shot, later dying at a hospital.

Inspector Prasad investigates the vigilante killings. His department narrows it down to a list of men who have had a family members recently killed by muggers and who are war veterans. The public, meanwhile, is happy that somebody is doing something about crime. Prasad soon suspects Prem. He is about to make an arrest when the district Madras intervenes and tells Prasad to "let him loose in another city instead". The D. A. and the police commissioner do not want the fact to get out that street crimes in Madras city have dropped dramatically, since Prem has become a vigilante. And they fear that if he isn't stopped, the whole city will explode into anarchy. Prasad doesn't like the idea, but relents, and Prasad says that he will try to "Scare him off".

Prem shoots two muggers on the stairs before being wounded by a third mugger with a M1911A1 pistol at a warehouse. His gun is discovered by a young patrolman who hands it to Inspector Prasad, who tells him to forget that he even saw it and additionally tells the press that the wounded Prem is just another mugging victim. Hospitalised, Prem is ordered by Prasad to leave Madras city permanently. Prasad tells Prem to have his company transfer him to another city in exchange. Prasad will dispose of Prem's revolver. As Prasad walks out of Prem's hospital room, Prem replies, "By sundown?"

Prem arrives in Egmore Railway Station by train. Being greeted by a company representative, he notices a group of hoodlums harassing a young woman. He excuses himself and helps the woman. The hoodlums make obscene gestures, but Prem points his right hand like a gun and smiles, suggesting that his vigilantism will continue.

== Cast ==
- Prem as Prem
- Rani Padmini as Kavitha
- S. A. Ashokan as Inspector Prasad
- Anjali as Indhu, Prem's first wife
- K. A. Thangavelu as Kavitha's Father
- Sridhar as Siva, Prem's brother-in-law
- Chithra as Subha, Prem's Sister & Siva's Wife
- Loose Mohan as Vandu, Kavitha's home servant
- Jayamalini as Kamala, Fruit seller woman

== Soundtrack ==
Music was by Shankar–Ganesh and lyrics were written by Vaali, Vairamuthu and Udhayanan.

Song	Singer	Length
"Paavai Idhazh Thean"	K. J. Yesudas, S. Janaki	04:10
"Vaanam Varumo"	Vani Jairam	05:03
"Vaanam Nalla"	L. R. Eswari	04:09
"Anjaaru Naal Aatchi"	P. Jayachandran, Vani Jairam	04:26
