= Unarchigal (2006 film) =

- Directed by: K. Rajan
- Produced by: K. R. Ganesh; M. Anbu
- Starring: Sriman; Abitha; Abhinayashree
- Music by: R. K. Sundhar
- Production company: KR Creations
- Release date: 24 March 2006
- Running time: 120 minutes
- Country: India
- Language: Tamil

Unarchigal (transl. Feelings) is a 2006 Indian Tamil-language drama film directed by K. Rajan. The film stars Sriman, Abitha and Abhinayashree in the lead roles, while K. Rajan, Kunal and Radha Ravi also appear in supporting roles. The film was released to a mixed response in March 2006.

== Cast ==
- Abbas as Balaji
- Sriman as Ramesh
- Abitha as Amrutha
- Abhinayashree as Kavitha
- K. Rajan as Ramesh and Amrutha's father
- Kunal as Lakshmi's husband
- Radha Ravi as Seshadri
- Manorama
- Lakshmi as Lakshmi
- Manobala as Manager
- Mayilsamy as Kalyanaraman
- Balaji as Balaji
- Singamuthu as Broker
- Chitra Lakshmanan as Balaji's father

== Soundtrack ==
Soundtrack was composed by R. K. Sundar.

- "Mannuranga" — Manorama
- "Vithithana" — Karthik
- "Poomaalaiyo" — Saindhavi
- "Roopthera" — Malathi

== Release ==
Upon release, the film received negative reviews from critics.
