= Gandhi Pirantha Mann =

1995 film by R. Sundarrajan

- VCD cover
- Directed by: R. Sundarrajan
- Written by: R. Sundarrajan
- Produced by: Tamil Fathima
- Starring: Vijayakanth; Revathi; Ravali
- Cinematography: Rajarajan
- Edited by: G. Jeyachandran
- Music by: Deva
- Production company: Tamilannai Cine Creation
- Release date: 22 July 1995
- Running time: 155 minutes
- Country: India
- Language: Tamil

Gandhi Pirantha Mann (transl. The land where Gandhi was born) is a 1995 Indian Tamil-language action drama film written and directed by R. Sundarrajan. The film stars Vijayakanth, Revathi, and Ravali. It was released on 22 July 1995. The film was a box office failure.

== Plot ==
Rukmani is pampered and brought up by her father Periyavar and uncles. Balu manages to get married with Rukmani by hiding the truth. Balu tells her the reason why he marries her. Gandhi and Lakshmi, his parents, were kind-hearted teachers and were transferred to a village. Gandhi and Lakshmi were determined to abolish the caste system in school. Soon, they clashed with Periyavar and his four brothers. They finally killed the innocent Gandhi. Balu is now determined to eradicate the caste hatred in Periyavar's village. What transpires later forms the crux of the story.

== Cast ==
- Vijayakanth in a dual role as
  - Balu
  - Gandhi
- Revathi as Lakshmi
- Ravali as Rukmani
- Radha Ravi as Periyavar (Gandhi)
- Mansoor Ali Khan
- R. Sundarrajan
- Delhi Ganesh as Iyer
- Thalaivasal Vijay
- Ponvannan
- Vivek as Cook
- Charle as Taxi driver
- Ponnambalam
- Periya Karuppu Thevar
- Sathyapriya
- Kazan Khan as Doctor
- Balu Anand
- Idichapuli Selvaraj as Narayanan
- Padmapriya as Padma
- Chelladurai as Arokiasamy
- Suryakanth
- Peeli Sivam
- C. R. Saraswathi as Sathyavathi
- Kokila
- Pasi Narayanan
- Dhanapal
- Thiruppur Ramasamy
- Nellai Siva
- Kovai Senthil
- Karate R. Thiagarajan in a guest appearance

== Soundtrack ==
The music was composed by Deva.

| Song | Singer(s) | Lyrics | Duration |
|---|---|---|---|
| "Aalamarathula" | S. P. Balasubrahmanyam | R. Sundarrajan | 5:13 |
| "Indian Endru" | S. P. Balasubrahmanyam | R. Sundarrajan | 4:52 |
| "Ottagathile Nee" | S. Janaki, Mano | R. Sundarrajan | 5:10 |
| "Pattam Pattam" | K. S. Chithra, S. P. Balasubrahmanyam | Gangai Amaran | 4:45 |
| "Pooparikira" | S. P. Balasubrahmanyam, K. S. Chithra | Gangai Amaran | 4:34 |
| "Thalaiva Naan" | S. Janaki, S. Kuzhanthaivelu | R. Sundarrajan | 4:33 |

== Reception ==
R. P. R. of Kalki wrote that the director made a masala film out of a sensitive issue like caste abolition superficially without going in depth about it while praising the dual roles of Vijayakanth and Deva's music.
