= Nadigai =

- Directed by: G. Babuganesh
- Written by: G. Babuganesh
- Produced by: G. Babuganesh
- Starring: G. Babuganesh; Tejashree
- Cinematography: G. Babuganesh
- Edited by: G. Babuganesh
- Music by: G. Babuganesh
- Production company: Bala Vignesh Creations
- Distributed by: Babuganesh Film International
- Release date: 28 November 2008
- Country: India
- Language: Tamil

Nadigai (transl. Actress) is a 2008 Indian Tamil-language drama film written, produced, directed, photographed and edited by G. Babuganesh. The film stars himself and Tejashree. The film was released after a seven year delay.

== Plot ==
Albert sets out to make a film on Mumtaj starring dancer Tejashree, and they fall in love. Albert briefly considers having Mumtaj play herself before reverting back to Tejashree. The film also highlights the dark things that happen in the cinema industry with Director Titanic and Dr. Daniel raping Tejashree's sister Chandra and killing Mumtaj.

== Cast ==
- Babu Ganesh as Albert
- Tejashree as Tejashree a.k.a. Teja
- Mumtaj as herself
- K. Rajan as Director Titanic
- Kovai Sarala as Kovai Sarala
- Malini as Police officer's wife
- Vijaykar as Police inspector
- Kumarimuthu
- Vaiyapuri as Albert's friend
- Ganeshkar as Albert's friend
- Bonda Mani as Mumtaj's manager (uncredited)
- Vengal Rao as Rowdy (uncredited)

=== Special appearances ===
- Jeewan Kumaranatunga as Police officer
- Rajendra Prasad as himself
- Shakeela as herself
- K. Sivasankar as himself
- Jayachitra as herself
- Mumaith Khan as an item number in "Vazhkaiye Konja"
- Gundu Hanumantha Rao as himself (in the song "Kanavu Thozhirchalai")

== Production ==
The film originally began production in 2001 under the title Miss Mumtaj with Jayammu Nischayammu Raa-fame G V H Prasad as the producer.

== Soundtrack ==
The music was composed by Babu Ganesh, who also wrote the lyrics.

Track listing
| No. | Title | Singer(s) | Length |
|---|---|---|---|
| 1. | "Kanavu Thozhirchalai" | P. Unnikrishnan | 4:13 |
| 2. | "Vazhkaiye Konja" (based on "Choli Ke Peeche Kya Hai" from Khal Nayak (1993)) | Bhuvana, Babu Ganesh, Kovai Kamala | 5:35 |
| 3. | "Roja Malare" (based on song of the same name from Veera Thirumagan (1962)) | Mary George, Binny Krishnakumar, Rajakumar | 4:55 |
| 4. | "Enda Munuswamy" | Harini, Babu Ganesh | 3:44 |
| 5. | "Thadha Mooku" | Karunas, Grace Karunas | 4:18 |
| 6. | "Velli Kolusu" | K. S. Chithra, S. P. Balasubrahmanyam | 5:41 |
| Total length: | | | 28:26 |

== Reception ==
A critic from The New Indian Express wrote that "Nadigai would have made a delightful spoof on the working of the film industry, and of film- making here. Like, on how a maker can direct, complete and get his films released at regular intervals, with not an inkling on how to work out a script".
