= Muddula Mogudu (1997 film) =

- Theatrical release poster
- Directed by: A. Kodandarami Reddy
- Written by: Posani Krishna Murali
- Produced by: K. Nageswara Rao; Satyanarayana (Presents)
- Starring: Nandamuri Balakrishna; Meena; Ravali
- Cinematography: K. S. Hari
- Edited by: Nageswara Rao; Satyam; Mudduri Babji
- Music by: Koti
- Production company: Ramaa Films
- Release date: 25 April 1997
- Running time: 128 minutes
- Country: India
- Language: Telugu

Muddula Mogudu (transl. Charming Husband) is a 1997 Indian Telugu-language drama film produced by K. Nageswara Rao, presented by Kaikala Satyanayana and directed by A. Kodandarami Reddy. It stars Nandamuri Balakrishna, Meena, Ravali, and music composed by Koti. The film was released on 25 April 1997.

== Plot ==
The film begins with Vamsi under authentication that he is a reincarnation of Salim, the son of 16th century Mughal Emperor Akbar, who has detached from his turtle dove Anarkali by walling up. Presently, he hunts her as Sirisha and shadows her. Since Vamsi vexes her, she makes a fool of him, but she too flourishes after the apprehension of his genuine love. Shakuntala Devi, Sirisha's mother, a woman of vanity, senses it via her sly sibling Gnaneshwara Rao, who ruses to knit Sirisha with his son Giri. So, she proceeds to Vamsi and knows he is her husband, Bhaskar Rao's nephew. At this point, she traduces his family, bisects the beloved, and hits Vamsi hard. Currently, Vamsi's mother, Parvatamma, scolds him for endearing Sirisha by stating the depravity of Shakuntala Devi, which attributed stigma to their family and spins rearward.

Twenty years ago, Shakuntala decided to knit her son Seshu Babu with Gnaneshwara Rao's daughter. However, he espouses Vamsi's sibling, Padmavati, who envies the wicked cabal by setting down an illicit affair with pregnant Padmavati when Seshu Babu necks her out. Plus, Gnaneshwara Rao attempts to garrot her when she dies giving birth to baby girl Sarada. Now, Parvatamma orders Vamsi to wed Sarada, which he denies and declares to join Sirisha.

Hence, Parvatamma moves with the proposal when Shakuntala is constrained to entrust her property to Sirisha. Parvatamma accepts it, and they are nuptial. Next, Vamsi kicks out Sirisha when Shakuntala questions him. Whereat, he replies that his marriage is only to spend three nights Sirisha, for which he paid his property as a price. Ergo, furious Sirisha forges fake certificates as a virgin, Vamsi is impotent and removes the wedding chain. Anyhow, Vamsi is quiet, and the gimmicks of Shakuntala fail when Sirisha conceives.

From there, Vamsi starts heckling and announces his splice with Sarada. Thus, Shakuntala & Sirisha bow out and plead for pardon from Vamsi. Here, Vamsi unfolds his play as vengeance against the evil done toward his sister when his family detects his eminence. Listening to it, Bhaskar Rao smacks Shakuntala and quits. Sirisha also attempts suicide, which reforms Shakuntala, but Gnaneshwara Rao backstabs her and abducts Sirisha. Shakuntala expresses her sinister feelings publicly and begs for mercy from Vamsi. At last, Vamsi ceases the baddies. Finally, the movie ends on a happy note with the couple's reunion.

== Cast ==
- Nandamuri Balakrishna as Vamsi
- Meena as Sirisha
- Ravali as Sarada & Padmavathi's daughter
- Satyanayana as Bhaskar Rao
- Pundarikakshaiah as Vamsi's Uncle
- Kota Srinivasa Rao as Gnaneswara Rao
- Chalapathi Rao as Vamsi's Uncle
- Srihari as Rowdy
- Brahmanandam as Saidulu
- Sudhakar as Giri
- Mallikarjuna Rao as Saidulu's father-in-law
- Raj Kumar as Seshu Babu
- Raja Ravindra as Sarada's Bridegroom
- Vinod as Senadhipathi
- Suthi Velu as Saidulu's grandfather
- Uttej as Hari
- Jenny as Police Inspector
- Lakshmi as Shakunthala Devi
- Annapurna as Parvatamma
- Annuja as Roja
- Ragini as Pooja
- Krishnaveni
- Radhabai as Sirisha's grandmother
- Y. Vijaya as Gallipeta Bujji
- Haritha as padmavathi balakrishna' sister

== Soundtrack ==
Muddula Mogudu

Film score by Koti
- Released: 1997
- Genre: Soundtrack
- Length: 29:07
- Label: Shiva Musicals
- Producer: Koti

Koti chronology
Intlo Illalu Vantintlo Priyuralu (1997)	Muddula Mogudu (1997)	Peddannayya (1997)

Music composed by Koti. Music released on Shiva Musicals Company.

No.	Title	Lyrics	Singer(s)	Length
1.	"Rave Raja Hamsalaa"	Sirivennela Seetharama Sastry	S. P. Balasubrahmanyam, Sujatha	4:47
2.	"Chiguraku Chilaka"	Veturi	S. P. Balasubrahmanyam, K. S. Chithra	4:14
3.	"Mainaa Mainaa"	Bhuvana Chandra	S. P. Balasubrahmanyam, Swarnalatha	5:08
4.	"O Muddu Gumma"	Veturi	S. P. Balasubrahmanyam, K. S. Chitra	5:00
5.	"Are Gili Gili"	Veturi	S. P. Balasubrahmanyam, Swarnalatha	5:18
6.	"Vinnara Chitralu"	Veturi	S. P. Balasubrahmanyam	4:40
Total length:				29:07

== Reception ==
The film was reviewed by Zamin Ryot. A critic from Andhra Today opined that "Although a story with a well tested theme and plot, Kodandarami Reddy's skillful & imaginative direction keep the audience's interest".
