= Mayalodu =

- Film poster
- Directed by: S. V. Krishna Reddy
- Written by: Diwakar Babu (dialogues)
- Screenplay by: S. V. Krishna Reddy
- Story by: S. V. Krishna Reddy; K. Achi Reddy (Main Story)
- Produced by: K. Atchi Reddy; Kishore Rathi (Presents)
- Starring: Rajendra Prasad; Soundarya
- Cinematography: Sarath
- Edited by: K. Ramgopal Reddy
- Music by: S. V. Krishna Reddy
- Production company: Manisha Films
- Release date: 23 July 1993
- Running time: 149 minutes
- Country: India
- Language: Telugu
- Box office: 55 crores

Mayalodu (transl. Magician) is a 1993 Indian Telugu-language comedy film directed by S. V. Krishna Reddy. The film stars Rajendra Prasad, Soundarya with music composed by S. V. Krishna Reddy. The film was produced by K. Achi Reddy under Manisha Films and presented by Kishore Rathi. Mayalodu was recorded as a superhit at the box office. The film won two Nandi Awards.

== Plot ==
The film begins with a spiteful Appalakonda assassinating his brother-in-law & sister to usurp the wealth. Spotting it, their infant Puppy absconds. The tale shifts to Veerababu, a guerrilla theater magician who acolytes his childhood mate, Pandu. Though Veerababu is a miraculous man, he never exploits them. Shortly, Pandu observes him as a tightwad and hoards his every penny at a lakher Padmanadham. So, he is about to go when Veerababu spins back. He comes across Puppy after fleeing from Appalakonda during his show. Being aware of totality, Veerababu takes her home and assigns responsibility to his grandmother. From there, they develop an emotional affinity, and he showers a blossom of fondness on Baby. Tragically, Puppy loses her eyesight in a mishap, and his skinflint is to recoup baby's vision for which ₹50,000 (US$590) is essential.

Besides, Sri, Padmanabham's naughty daughter, is relentlessly ribbing the men. SI Anandam becomes a scapegoat to her in a dine-and-dash. Chanti Appalakonda's callow son is behind her by proposing, and she pocks his fun. Veerababu strikes back Sri later with a one-hit and the two crush. Chanti is conscious that Sri fascinates magic, and he pesters his father to drill. Whereat, Appalakonda calls Veerababu, by which he reaches his target. Right on the day, Padmanabham rebukes & refuses to supply the sum, mindful of his love affair with Sri. Hence, Veerababu grabs his rightfully due. Appalakonda gets to that who ruses by slaughtering Padmanabham, heisting the remaining wealth, and incriminating Veerababu.

Due to this, the operation bars when Puppy catches SI Anandam's eye. He notifies Appalakonda, and they attack Veerababu's residence, but the grandmother, & Pandu secure and escape with the baby. Veerababu is currently penalized to life on Appalakonda's witness. Thus, Veerababu enrages & pledges to reprisal. Parallelly, Sri declares Veerababu is the homicide, seeks vengeance, and robs Anandam's revolver. She misfires, hitting some officials' birds, and Anandam receives a higher authorities' admonition. As a glimpse, Chanti shades Pandu, who wittily transforms him into a skeleton body with a human head to dispose of.

Meanwhile, Appalakonda's sidekicks seize & torment the grandmother & Pandu for Puppy's whereabouts. Discerning it, Veerababu breaks the bars with his occult powers. He assaults blackguards with the conjuring and relieves his men. Following this, Appalakonda moves several pawns to raid Veerababu, which he backfires. Now, Veerababu sets out all for Puppy's surgery by gamely obtaining the money from Appalakonda. The Doctor says Veerababu must be in front of Baby when she opens her eyes. Otherwise, the complete try is futile. Sri overhears it, links to Appalakonda with half-knowledge, and they abduct Puppy. However, Veerababu gains it via Chanti, who makes him usual, and he appears before Puppy with illusion and retrieves her vision. At last, Veerababu ceases Appalakonda with his mystical knack and makes him confess his sins at the judiciary when Sri is also regretful. Finally, the movie ends happily with Veerababu again performing the roadshow with his family members.

== Cast ==
- Rajendra Prasad as Veera Babu
- Soundarya as Siri
- Kota Srinivasa Rao as Appalakonda
- Brahmanandam as Inspector
- Babu Mohan as Chanti
- Gundu Hanumantha Rao as Pandu
- Ali as Constable
- AVS as Supermarket Owner
- Padmanabham as Padmanabham
- Subbaraya Sharma as I.G.
- Jenny
- Narsing Yadav
- K. K. Sarma as Comedy Wizard
- Potti Veeraiah as Comedy Wizard
- Maganti Sudhakar as Puppy's father
- Kishore Rathi as Magician
- Vidyasagar as Tirupati
- Sri Lakshmi as Appalakonda's second wife
- Nirmalamma as Veera Babu's Bamma
- Baby Nikitha as Puppy

== Soundtrack ==
Mayalodu

Film score by S. V. Krishna Reddy
- Released: 1993
- Genre: Soundtrack
- Length: 21:47
- Label: AKASH Audio
- Producer: S. V. Krishna Reddy

S. V. Krishna Reddy chronology
Rajendrudu Gajendrudu (1993)	Mayalodu (1993)	Number One (1994)

Music composed by S. V. Krishna Reddy. The song "Chinuku Chinuku" was well received and was again reused in another Krishna Reddy film, Subhalagnam (1994). Music released on AKASH Audio Company.

No.	Title	Lyrics	Singer(s)	Length
1.	"Nee Mayalodu"	Gaduri Vishwanadha Sastry	S. P. Balasubrahmanyam, Chitra	4:59
2.	"Chalaaki Chilipi"	Bhuvana Chandra	S. P. Balasubrahmanyam, Chitra	5:01
3.	"Choomantar Kaali"	Sirivennela Sitarama Sastry	S. P. Balasubrahmanyam	3:48
4.	"Chinuku Chinuku"	Jonnavithhula	SPB, Chitra	3:57
5.	"Udatha Udatha"	Sirivennela Sitarama Sastry	S. P. Balasubrahmanyam	4:02
Total length:				21:47

== Awards ==
Nandi Awards

- Best Home Viewing Feature Film - K. Atchi Reddy
- Best Child Actress - Baby Nikhita
