= Veeramani (film) =

- Directed by: Prem
- Written by: Prem
- Produced by: Indira Prem
- Starring: Prem; Yuvarani
- Cinematography: K. C. Diwakar
- Edited by: Gokula Chezhian
- Music by: Ekandhan
- Production company: A Lotus Film Company
- Release date: 16 September 1994
- Running time: 145 minutes
- Country: India
- Language: Tamil

Veeramani is a 1994 Indian Tamil-language action film directed by Prem. The film stars himself and Yuvarani, with Prakash, Vinu Chakravarthy, V. K. Ramasamy, Jai Ganesh and Charle playing supporting roles. It was released on 16 September 1994.

== Plot ==
The film begins with the murder of a scientist. The superintendent of police Veeramani catches the culprit. During the enquiry, the culprit Gautham reveals everything. Gautham was, in fact, a talented sprinter but jobless. He therefore needed money for his father's surgery, so Shaktiman hired him to kill the scientist. Shaktiman is the leader of a terrorist group and he is also a fake swami. In the meantime, the journalist Rakeswari falls in love with Veeramani. The rest of the film is a cat-and-mouse game between Shaktiman and Veeramani.

== Cast ==
- Prem as Veeramani
- Yuvarani as Rakeswari
- Prakash as Shaktiman
- Vinu Chakravarthy as Chief Minister
- V. K. Ramasamy as Krishnamurthy
- Jai Ganesh as Rangaraj
- Charle as Singaravelan
- Babloo Prithiveeraj as Gautham
- S. N. Vasanth as Nagarajan
- Bharath as Bharath
- Peeli Sivam
- Kokila as Kokila
- Kavyasree
- Vaishnavi as Shanthi
- Master Udayaraj as Kannan
- Baboos
- Gemini Ganesan in a guest appearance
- Sadhana in a special appearance

== Soundtrack ==
The music was composed by Ekandhan, with lyrics written by Vaali.

Song	Singer(s)	Duration
"Veeramani"	Usha Uthup	4:30
"Chithirathil Thottu"	S. P. Balasubrahmanyam, Mano, K. S. Chithra, Swarnalatha	4:00
"Aagayam Bhoomi"	K. J. Yesudas, Radhika Ravishankar	4:10

== Reception ==
Malini Mannath of The Indian Express said, "the screenplay is weak, some of the key characters [...] and situations [...] are not handled convincingly. Individual shots seem to be well-planned and sickly executed, and there are some good moments in the film" like the climax. Thulasi of Kalki wrote the film reminds of films of Jaishankar, praised Gemini Ganesan's cameo, Yuvarani's presence as relief felt the film whose pep carried till the interval gets lost in the next scene panning the climax fight and cinematography.
