= Vetri Karangal =

- Poster
- Directed by: R. Krishnamoorthy
- Screenplay by: L. Dhanraj
- Story by: Prem
- Produced by: Indira Prem
- Starring: Prabhu; Prem; Rupini; Sadhana
- Cinematography: Babu
- Edited by: V. Chakrapani
- Music by: Ilaiyaraaja
- Production company: Lotus Film Company
- Release date: 15 March 1991
- Country: India
- Language: Tamil

Vetri Karangal (transl. Hands of victory) is a 1991 Indian Tamil-language action film directed by R. Krishnamoorthy, starring Prabhu, Prem, Rupini and Sadhana. It was released on 15 March 1991.

== Cast ==
- Prabhu as Arun
- Prem Menon as Anand
- Rupini as Priya
- Sadhana as Radha / Kalpana (dual role)
- Vijayakumar as Thyagarajan
- Manjula Vijayakumar as Lakshmi
- Vinu Chakravarthy
- Radha Ravi
- V. K. Ramasamy
- Senthil

== Soundtrack ==
The music was composed by Ilaiyaraaja.

Song	Singers	Lyrics	Length
"Izhukka Izhukka"	Mano, S. Janaki	Vaali	04:48
"Megha Veedhiyil"	Arunmozhi, Mano	Gangai Amaran	04:45
"Nalliravu Mella Mella"	Mano, S. Janaki	Vaali	05:12
"Unnaala Thoongala"	Mano, Chithra	Kamakodiyan	04:41

== Reception ==
C. R. K. of Kalki criticised the film for the story, which they felt was not well developed.
