= Vidukathai =

- Theatrical release poster
- Directed by: Agathiyan
- Written by: Agathiyan
- Produced by: K. Balachander; Rajam Balachander; Pushpa Kandaswamy
- Starring: Prakash Raj; Neena
- Cinematography: Suriyan
- Edited by: Lancy–Mohan
- Music by: Deva
- Production company: Kavithalayaa Productions
- Release date: 30 October 1997
- Country: India
- Language: Tamil

Vidukathai (transl. Riddle) is a 1997 Indian Tamil-language romantic drama film written and directed by Agathiyan, and produced by Kavithalayaa Productions. The film stars Prakash Raj and Neena, while Manivannan and Janagaraj appear in supporting roles. It was released on 30 October 1997.

== Plot ==
Anandhi is a seventeen-year-old college student who lives with her widowed father, Ramanadhan, a psychiatrist who twice suffered heart attacks. Her father raised her to be thoughtful, mature and forward-thinking, unlike her shy and timid contemporaries. She receives attention and proposals from male students which she rejects because of their immature infatuation. Once in a while she and her father are visited by their family friends Manasatchi and a fellow doctor Ilango.

Ramanadhan suffers a fatal severe cardiac arrest, leaving Anandhi orphaned. Despite her loss, Anandhi remains strong and continues to handle her father's funeral and continues with her studies. Her friends and college professors are surprised when she returns to study, showing no emotional distress. Manasatchi consoles her and assists her in the grieving process.

Almost after a month of her father's death, Anandhi is visited by Neelakandan, a single former Army man in his early 40s. He reminds Anandhi that he had a brief chat with her father a month ago while her father was looking for a tenant for their out-house. Anandhi conveys her father's loss and lets Neelakandan stay at their out-house as a tenant. Neelakandan and Anandhi spend much time together. Anandhi ponders on their relationship and decides to marry Neelakandan. Her decision surprises him, especially because of the age difference. Eventually she convinces him and they decide to marry with Manasatchi and Ilango as witnesses.

Neelakandan and Anandhi go to Goa for their honeymoon and Neelakandan encourages her to continue her studies. Her wedding surprises her college mates and professors, who advise against it and distance themselves from her. Anandhi then decides to quit her studies and remain a homemaker while Neelakandan finds a job as a security guard in a factory owned by Vijayan, who is also in his early 50s and apparently married a woman in her early 20s. As Neelakandan and Anandhi visit a jewellery shop, a fellow customer mistakes them to be father and daughter, which disappoints Neelakandan. Eventually, Anandhi's classmate from her college visits her to see if she is happy despite the difference in age. Anandhi tells her husband that he proposed to her during her college days. Neelakandan then develops a complex regarding their age difference.

Vijayan tells Neelakandan how he caught his wife cheating with one of his employees whom he tried to fire, framing him for theft to avoid the disgrace. Neelakandan worries about a similar situation with his wife developing and the age gap. He tries to separate from her and hopes she will marry a younger man. He avoids Anandhi and treats her with contempt and anger. He encourages her to marry her college friend. As his anxiety increases they visit Dr. Ilango for consultation and Anandhi recognises the true problem. On their way back to her home, Neelakandan abandons her and goes home, planning to flee. But Anandhi arrives and tells Neelakandan that she loves him despite their different ages.

== Cast ==
- Prakash Raj as Neelakandan
- Neena as Anandhi
- Manivannan
- Janagaraj
- Vijayan
- Balu Anand
- Suthangan
- Ramji
- Jegadeesh
- Akash

== Production ==
Neena, a former child actress in Keladi Kannmanii (1991), was selected for the lead role in Vidukathai when she was still at school and had to work on her schedules around exams. The production of the film was hampered by the FEFSI strike of 1997 and the makers had to postpone the venture from its original scheduled release date of June 1997. Subbu Panchu, son of producer Panchu Arunachalam worked as a dance choreographer for the film.

== Music ==
The soundtrack was composed by Deva.

Track listing
No.	Title	Lyrics	Singer(s)	Length
1.	"Hello Hello"	Vaasan	Sujatha, Sabesh	05:13
2.	"Idhayam Idhayam"	Agathiyan	K. S. Chithra, Krishnaraj	05:21
3.	"Kidaichiruchu"	Agathiyan	Anuradha Sriram, Krishnaraj	05:04
4.	"Mani Madathu"	Kalidasan	P. Unnikrishnan	05:03
5.	"Meenakshi Kaiyil"	Agathiyan	K. S. Chithra, Kalpana	05:09
Total length:				25:50

== Release and reception ==
Vidukathai was released on 30 October 1997. K. N. Vijiyan of New Straits Times praised the film's plot and the performances of lead actors. Ji of Kalki wrote Agathiyan who kept the masala elements away has also kept aside the idea of keeping the message clear and complete which are major obstacles to the flow to the film, he however praised the performances of Prakash Raj, Neena, Janagaraj and Manivannan but felt whether audience could able to understand the concept and psychology of this film.
