= Desiya Paravai =

- Directed by: Babu Ganesh
- Written by: Babu Ganesh
- Produced by: S. Senguttuven; S. Thilagavathi; S. Anjuham; A. Jotheeswaran
- Starring: Suresh; Urvashi; Nizhalgal Ravi; Babu Ganesh; Vineetha; Vadivelu
- Cinematography: R. G. Gopal
- Edited by: V. Udayashankar
- Music by: Ilayaraaja
- Production company: S. Sen Film International
- Release date: 17 November 2006
- Country: India
- Language: Tamil

Desiya Paravai (transl. National bird) is a 2006 Indian Tamil-language action drama film directed by Babu Ganesh starring himself, Suresh, Urvashi, Nizhalgal Ravi, Vineetha, and Vadivelu.

== Cast ==
- Suresh as David
- Urvashi as Malini
- Vichu Sivakumar
- Nizhalgal Ravi
- Babu Ganesh as Raja
- Vinitha as Priya
- Roopasri
- Vadivelu as Azhagu
- Kumarimuthu

== Production ==
The film began production in 1996 as Naan Oru Indian (transl. I am an Indian). The film is about the Kargil War, and reportedly ten percent of the audio cassette sales were donated to the war victims in 2003. The nine getups of Vadivelu's character were publicized by the makers prior to the film's release.

== Soundtrack ==
The music was composed by Ilayaraaja. The lyrics are written by Ilayaraaja, Kamakodiyan, Mu. Metha and Vaali.

- "Chittuk Kuruvi Kuruvi" - Mano, S. Janaki
- "Yemarathe Yematra" - S. N. Surendar, Selvakumar, chorus
- "Deepavali Innikki" - S. P. Balasubrahmanyam, K. S. Chithra, Arunmozhi, chorus
- "Priya Priya" - P. Unnikrishnan, Bhavatharini
- "Chinna Chinna" - Ilayaraaja, chorus
- "Chengal Pattu Chinnachittu" - Mano, chorus

== Reception ==
Malini Mannath of Chennai Online wrote that "Not much expectation from this film, so not much disappointment either".
