= K. Rajan (producer) =

Indian film producer and director (1941–2026)

- Born: 25 February 1941
- Died: 17 May 2026 (aged 85); Chennai, Tamil Nadu, India
- Occupation: Film producer
- Years active: 1980-2026
- Children: 4

K. Rajan (25 February 1941 – 17 May 2026) was an Indian film producer and director who worked on Tamil films.

== Early life and career ==
K. Rajan was born on 25 February 1941. He began his career as a producer through the Tamil film, Brammacharigal (1983) starring Suresh. In 1991, he directed the film Namma Ooru Mariamma starring Nizhalgal Ravi and Sarathkumar, before working as a writer on Thangamana Thangachi (1991) for director Senthilnathan. For the films, he associated with Ganesh Cine Arts and music composers Shankar–Ganesh.

In 2000, Rajan took on the role of the president of Chennai Distributors Association. Rajan launched his son Prabhukanth as an actor in 2000, who acted in his first lead role through Aval Paavam (2000). Prabhukanth also featured as the antagonist in Doubles (2000), and later worked on Ninaikkatha Naalillai (2001), before making a return as a film director through LKG (2019). During the early 2000s, Rajan also worked on another project, Babu Ganesh's Kudumbam Oru Koiyil starring Ramki, although the project was later dropped.

In June 2005, director Rajan chose to shelve his proposed biopic of Sivakasi Jayalakshmi titled Niram Maraiya Rojakal starring Vindya. He then began working on a directorial project titled Unarchigal which would explore the life of adolescent youths and cast actresses Devayani and Sindhuri in the lead roles, alongside newcomer male actors. However a production delay meant that the film went through a change of cast and Rajan started the project with Abbas and Kunal.

== Death ==
On 17 May 2026, Rajan died by suicide after jumping into the Adyar River for unknown reasons. He was 85. The fire service recovered his body and an investigation is ongoing to determine the reason.

== In the media ==
K. Rajan attracted controversy for his statements on Tamil cinema.

In June 2001, Rajan was arrested for attacking fellow producer Keyaar.

In April 2019, at the launch of the soundtrack of the film Ettuthikkum Para (2020), Rajan threatened singer Chinmayi over her claims in the MeToo movement against Vairamuthu. At the same event, director Pa. Ranjith criticised Rajan's remarks. During a public speech in December 2019, he criticised actors Kamal Haasan and Dhanush, and directors Selvaraghavan and Gautham Vasudev Menon, for their loss-making films. He made directed reference to films such as Aayirathil Oruvan (2010) and Enai Noki Paayum Thota (2019). The following month, he spoke out against Nayanthara for charging a high remuneration for her films. In 2019 and 2020, he also publicly criticised Yogi Babu at the audio launch of Paramapadham Vilayattu (2021), Bharathirajaa for starting a rival producers' association, and the Animal Welfare Board of India for allegedly taking bribes.

== Filmography ==
=== As director, writer, and producer ===
Year	Film	Credited as		
Year	Film	Director	Writer	Producer
1983	Brammacharigal			Yes
1991	Namma Ooru Mariamma	Yes	Yes	
1991	Thangamana Thangachi			Yes
1992	Chinna Poovai Killathe		Yes	
2000	Doubles			Yes
2000	Aval Paavam			Yes
2001	Ninaikkatha Naalillai		Yes	
2005	Unarchigal	Yes	Yes	

=== As actor ===
Year	Film	Role	Notes
1987	Michael Raj		
1989	Sonthakkaran	Resident of Bharath Nagar	
1992	Chinna Poovai Killathe		
1998	Ulavuthurai	Rajaram	
2000	Doubles		Cameo appearance
2000	En Sakhiye	Sharma	
2001	Kabadi Kabadi		
2001	Veettoda Mappillai	Producer	
2005	Girivalam	Wedding guest	
2005	Aadhikkam	Jhansi's father	
2005	Sorry Enaku Kalyanamayidichu		
2006	Unarchigal	Ramesh and Amrutha's father	
2008	Nadigai	Director Titanic	
2012	Idhayam Thiraiarangam		
2016	Pagiri	Politician	
2017	Paambhu Sattai	Shanmugam	
2023	Thunivu	Opposition leader	
2023	Bakasuran	Beemarasu's father and Divya's grandfather	
