= En Aasai Unnoduthan =

1983 film directed by K Narayanan

- Poster
- Directed by: K. Narayanan
- Screenplay by: Dhanraj
- Story by: Prem
- Produced by: Indira Prem
- Starring: Prem; Poornima Jayaram
- Cinematography: A. V. Ramakrishnan
- Edited by: K. Narayanan
- Music by: Shankar–Ganesh
- Production company: Lotus Film Company
- Release date: 30 September 1983
- Country: India
- Language: Tamil

En Aasai Unnoduthan (transl. My desire is with you) is a 1983 Indian Tamil-language romance film edited and directed by K. Narayanan. The film stars Prem and Poornima Jayaram, with Thengai Srinivasan, Y. G. Mahendran, Rajini, Oru Viral Krishna Rao and Jaishankar in supporting roles. It was released on 30 September 1983.

== Cast ==
- Prem
- Poornima Jayaram
- Thengai Srinivasan
- Y. G. Mahendran
- Rajini
- Oru Viral Krishna Rao
- Jaishankar

== Production ==
The film was launched at AVM Studios.

== Soundtrack ==
The soundtrack was composed by Shankar–Ganesh. The song "Devi Koondhalo" is based on "Happy Together" by The Turtles.

Track listing
No.	Title	Lyrics	Singer(s)	Length
1.	"Devi Koondhalo"	Vairamuthu	Vani Jairam, K. J. Yesudas	3:43
2.	"Nilave Unathu"	Vaali	Vani Jairam	3:35
3.	"Unakkaaga Poojai Seidha"	Vaali	P. Jayachandran, S. P. Sailaja	4:19
4.	"Chinnappoo Nannappoo"	Vaali	Vani Jairam	4:26
Total length:				16:03

== Reception ==
Jayamanmadhan of Kalki said that, apart from the inclusion of Y. G. Mahendran, Thengai Srinivasan and Oru Viral Krishna Rao among others, there was nothing special about the film.
