= Vinodam =

- Promotional poster
- Directed by: S. V. Krishna Reddy
- Written by: Diwakara Babu (dialogues)
- Screenplay by: S. V. Krishna Reddy
- Story by: K. Atchi Reddy
- Produced by: K. Atchi Reddy
- Starring: Srikanth; Ravali; Kota Srinivasa Rao
- Cinematography: T. Sarath
- Edited by: Ramgopal Reddy
- Music by: S. V. Krishna Reddy
- Production company: Manisha Films
- Release date: 2 August 1996
- Country: India
- Language: Telugu

Vinodam is a 1996 Indian Telugu-language comedy film directed by S. V. Krishna Reddy. K. Atchi Reddy produced the film under the Manisha Films banner. S. V. Krishna Reddy also composed the music for this film. The film stars Srikanth and Ravali. Vinodam was commercially successful.

Brahmanandam's portrayal of a silent thief became iconic, and he later listed Vinodam among his top films.

== Plot ==
Ashta Lakshmi (Ravali) is the daughter of Bangaram (Kota Srinivasa Rao). He is ready to do anything to make her happy. Four friends (Srikanth, Sivaji Raja, Uttej, Bandla Ganesh) live in a rented house owned by Chintamani (Tanikella Bharani). They frequently deceive their owner by not paying rent to him. They lead a carefree and happy life.

== Cast ==
- Srikanth as Raja
- Ravali as Ashta Lakshmi "Ala"
- Kota Srinivasa Rao as Bangaram
- Brahmanandam as thief
- Babu Mohan as Bangaram's secretary
- Ali as Bangaram's car driver
- Prakash Raj as Prakash, Bangaram's son-in-law
- Tanikella Bharani as Chintamani
- A. V. S. as A. V. Subrahmanyam
- Sivaji Raja as Raja's friend
- Uttej as Raja's friend
- Bandla Ganesh as Raja's friend
- Mallikarjuna Rao as Malli
- Gundu Hanumantha Rao as Gundu
- Rallapalli as Nageshwara Rao
- Y. Vijaya as Subrahmanyam's wife
- Subbaraya Sarma as S.I. Hanumantha Rao
- Gautam Raju

== Soundtrack ==
All music is composed by S. V. Krishna Reddy.

Track list
No.	Title	Lyrics	Singer(s)	Length
1.	"Jingilaalo Em Gingiralo"	Sirivennela Seetharama Sastry	S. P. Balasubrahmanyam, Chitram Murali, Ram Chakravarthi	5:06
2.	"Mallepula Vaana"	Sirivennela Seetharama Sastry	S. P. Balasubrahmanyam, K. S. Chithra	5:02
3.	"Chalaaki Kaluva Kaluva"	Bhuvana Chandra	S. P. Balasubrahmanyam, Suresh Peters	4:20
4.	"Kammaga Saage Swaramo"	Sirivennela Seetharama Sastry	S. P. Balasubrahmanyam, K. S. Chithra, Srinivas Karthik, T. R. Kala	5:29
5.	"Hai Laila Priyurala"	Sirivennela Seetharama Sastry	S. P. Balasubrahmanyam, K. S. Chithra	4:52
Total length:				24:51

== Awards ==
- Nandi Award for Best Male Comedian – Brahmanandam
