= Krodham 2 =

2000 film by Prem Menon

- Directed by: Prem
- Written by: Prem Menon; Piraisoodan (dialogues)
- Produced by: Indira Prem
- Starring: Prem; Radhika Chaudhari; Khushbu
- Cinematography: Abdul Rahman
- Edited by: V. Udhayasankaran
- Music by: Deva
- Production company: Lotus Film Company
- Release date: 1 September 2000
- Country: India
- Language: Tamil

Krodham 2 (transl. Fury 2) is a 2000 Indian Tamil language thriller film, produced, written and directed by Prem. The film stars Prem Menon himself, alongside Radhika Chaudhari and Khushbu, while Nassar and Mansoor Ali Khan portray supporting roles. A sequel to A. Jagannathan's 1982 film, Krodham, the music for the film was composed by Deva and was released on 1 September 2000.

== Cast ==
- Prem as Dheeran
- Radhika Chaudhari
- Khushbu as Latha
- Rajeev as Rajasekharan
- Nassar as Rathnavel
- Mansoor Ali Khan as Selvakumar
- Anandaraj as Yogaraj
- Senthil

== Production ==
A sequel to his earlier film Krodham (1982), Prem Menon began work on the project during 1999 after returning from an alternate career in business in London. The film was shot in Salem, Chennai and Kerala. Prem was inspired to make a rare sequel in Tamil cinema after being inspired by Hollywood actions films. Radhika Chaudhari was cast in the film after Prem failed to bring a Dubai-based actress into the project.

== Soundtrack ==
Soundtrack was composed by Deva and lyrics written by Piraisoodan.

Song	Singers	Length
Vethala Potta	S. P. Balasubrahmanyam, Swarnalatha	05:26
En Thalaiva	Sujatha, Mano	04:57
Ninaithal Un	T. L. Maharajan, Prem	05:21
Tokyo Pappa	Swarnalatha	05:33
Baba Baba	Harini, Vijay Yesudas	06:07

== Reception ==
Malathi Rangarajan of The Hindu wrote the film "begins with engrossing and sophisticated action from the word `go' which continues till the end of the first half, but action tapers into melodrama and tedium, especially in the last few scenes". Malini Mannath wrote in Chennai Online, "The first half of the film keeps one engaged with its racy narration and clever use of gadgetry and computer graphics. But the second half is a long drawn out affair".
