= Ravali =

Indian actress

Ravali Kollipara
- Born: Sailaja; 22 December 1972 (age 53); Gudivada, Andhra Pradesh, India
- Other names: Ravali, Apsara, Mythili
- Occupation: Actress
- Spouse(s): Neeli Krishna (m.2007-present)
- Children: 2

Ravali is an Indian actress who has appeared in Telugu, Tamil, Kannada, Malayalam and Hindi language films. She is probably best known for her performances in Subhakankshalu, Pelli Sandadi, Vinodam and Mard.

== Career ==
She acted in Telegu films like Alibaba Aradajanu Dongalu (1993), Orey Rikshaw (1995), Pelli Sandadi (1996), Vinodam (1996), Subhakankshalu (1997) were all commercial successes. She did manage to get big films with some big names in both Tamil and Telugu. She co-starring with Vijayakanth in Tamil films, Thirumoorthy (1995) and Gandhi Pirantha Mann (1996). Ravali also acted in her debut and the only Hindi film Mard (1998), in which she shared the screen with Mithun Chakraborty.

In the late 1990s, offers began to reduce for Ravali in Tamil cinema. Notably, two of her ongoing projects, Kaangeyan Kaalai opposite Parthiban, and Ninaithale opposite Abbas were also abruptly stalled. During the making of Nagalingam, Ravali was not paid by the producers and she took action by reporting the case to the Nadigar Sangam, which their chief Vijayakanth helped settle.

== Personal life ==
Ravali married Neeli Krishna on 9 May 2007 at Sarath Palace function hall, Kondapur, Hyderabad and subsequently announced her retirement from films. Her first daughter was born in May 2008 and second daughter was born in July 2018.

== Partial filmography ==
Year	Film	Role	Language	Notes
1991	Jayabheri		Telugu	
1992	Mr & Mrs		Malayalam	
1992	Pattathu Raani	Shanthi	Tamil	
1993	Alibaba Aradajanu Dongalu	Phoolan Devi	Telugu	
1995	Thirumoorthy	Uma	Tamil	
1995	Vaddu Bava Thappu	Manju	Telugu	
1995	Real Hero		Telugu	
1995	Gandhi Pirantha Mann	Rukmani	Tamil	
1995	Orey Rikshaw		Telugu	
1996	Pelli Sandadi	Kalyani	Telugu	Nominated, Filmfare Award for Best Actress – Telugu
1996	Pellala Rajyam		Telugu	
1996	Devaraagam	Kukku	Malayalam	
1996	Ramudochadu	Seshagiri	Telugu	
1996	Akka Bagunnava		Telugu	
1996	Rayudugaru Nayudugaru		Telugu	
1996	Vinodam	Ashta Lakshmi	Telugu	
1997	Chinnabbayi	Satyavathi	Telugu	
1997	Kurralla Rajyam		Telugu	
1997	Subhakankshalu	Priyadarsini (Nirmala Mary)	Telugu	
1997	Muddula Mogudu	Sarada & Padmavathi	Telugu	
1997	Priyamaina Srivaru		Telugu	
1997	Abhimanyu	Manju	Tamil	
1997	Periya Manushan	Indhu	Tamil	
1997	Putham Puthu Poove		Tamil	Unreleased
1998	Prathista	Rekha	Telugu	
1998	Mard	Kammo	Hindi	
1998	Veeranna		Kannada	
1998	Daddy Daddy	Ranjani	Telugu	
1998	Gadibidi Krishna		Kannada	
1998	Gamyam	Roopa	Telugu	
1998	Pelladi Chupistha		Telugu	
1999	Kubera	Aishwarya	Kannada	
1999	Maravathe Kanmaniye	Kanmani	Tamil	
1999	Khalanayaka	Jyothi	Kannada	
2000	Billa Ranga		Kannada	
2000	Nagalingam	Priya	Tamil	
2000	Karisakattu Poove	Nagamani	Tamil	
2000	Unnai Kann Theduthey	Gayathri	Tamil	
2000	Ninne Premistha	Srilakshmi	Telugu	
2000	Tirumala Tirupati Venkatesa		Telugu	
2001	Jipuna Nanna Ganda		Kannada	
2001	Pandanti Samsaram		Telugu	
2001	Fort Kochi		Malayalam	
2001	Praja	Diana	Malayalam	
2002	Bharatasimha Reddy	Kalyani	Telugu	
2002	Padai Veetu Amman	Rathna	Tamil	
2003	Anbu Thollai	Chinnathayi	Tamil	
2003	Ammulu		Telugu	
2003	The Judgement		Malayalam	
2004	SP Simha IPS		Telugu	
2004	Santhi Sandesam		Telugu	
2005	Keelu Gurram		Telugu	
2005	Mulla Kireetam		Telugu	
2005	Gowtam SSC	Renu	Telugu	
2006	10th Class		Telugu	
2006	Astram	Item number	Telugu	
2006	47A Besant Nagar Varai		Tamil	
2006	Stalin	Muddu Krishnayya's daughter	Telugu	
2006	Boss		Telugu	
2009	Life Style		Telugu	
2011	Pilla Dorikithe Pelli		Telugu	
