= Neena (Tamil actress) =

Indian actress

Neena Pillai
- Born: 2 October 1981 (age 44); Chennai, India
- Other name: Neena Pillai
- Occupation: Actress
- Years active: (1983-2003)
- Spouse: Sendhilkumar

Neena (born 2 October 1981, in Chennai) is a former Indian actress who has appeared in the Tamil film industry. Beginning her career as a child artiste, the actress performed in Vidukathai (1997) and later appeared in other Tamil films.

== Career ==
After making a debut as the younger version of Anju's character in Vasanth's Keladi Kanmani (1990), Neena appeared in Selva's serial drama, Neela Mala. Despite garnering offers to star in films, Neena refused several chances to appear in leading roles, before signing on to star in K. Balachandar's production Vidukathai (1997) directed by Agathiyan. Her performance in the film won critical acclaim upon release, with a reviewer noting her "acting is excellent" and that she "brings out every aspect of the character she is playing, especially the clear-cut deliveries of her dialogues emphasizing the inner strength of the character". After a few more film roles, she returned to prioritise television roles, appearing in dramas such as Chithi.

== Personal life ==
In 2004 she got married and moved to Melbourne, Australia.

== Filmography ==
Year	Film	Role	Notes
1987	Nayakan	Saaru	child artist; uncredited
1989	Geethanjali	Geethanjali's younger sister	Telugu film; child artist
1990	Keladi Kanmani	Anu	child artist
1992	Meera	Bus passenger	child artist
1997	Raasi	Kavitha	
1997	Vidukathai	Anandhi	
1998	Kannathal	Kannatha	
2000	Sudhandhiram	Neena	
2000	Nagalingam	Nagakanni	
2000	Puratchikkaaran	Valli	

== Television ==
Year	Series Name	Role	Notes
1991	Penn		
1998	Jeyupathu Nejam		
1998-99	Ippadikki Thendral		
2000-2001	Chithi	Kaveri Madhavan	
2002	Udhayam		
2002	Annamalai	Young Annamalai	
2002-2004	Varam	Ranjini	
