= En Sakhiye =

2000 Tamil romantic thriller film by Ravi-Raja

- Directed by: Ravi-Raja
- Written by: Ravi-Raja
- Produced by: K. Bhaskar Raj
- Starring: Devaraj; Divya; Prabhu Sekhar
- Cinematography: Dayal Osho
- Edited by: A. Joseph
- Music by: Pradeep Ravi
- Production company: L. V. Productions
- Release date: 1 December 2000
- Running time: 125 minutes
- Country: India
- Language: Tamil

En Sakhiye (transl. My female friend) is a 2000 Indian Tamil-language romantic thriller film directed by the duo Ravi-Raja. The film stars newcomers Devaraj, Divya and Prabhu Sekhar, with K. Rajan, Meenal and Shanmugasundaram playing supporting roles. The film, produced by K. Bhaskar Raj, was released on 1 December 2000.

== Plot ==
Sakhi (Divya), a gold medalist at her college, is an orphan, and she completes her college degree thanks to the scholarship program. After the graduation ceremony, she breaks down in tears as she has no one to turn to and nowhere to go. Her friend Rama (Meenal) then accommodates her at her home.

Later, Sakhi finds a job in a company. The company manager Shanmugam (Shanmugasundaram) warns her about the managing director Raja (Prabhu Sekhar), who spends his days drinking and hanging around with his friends at the beach. Sharma (K. Rajan), the company owner and Raja's father, is busy working overseas and hates his son's behavior. Sakhi relentlessly pursues the drunkard Raja and makes him fall in love with her. Thereafter, Sakhi makes him change his bad habits, and Raja is now ready to wed her. But just before the wedding, Sakhi kills him.

She now turns her attention to Sunil (Devaraj), Raja's younger brother, who comes to his brother's funeral from abroad. In contrast to his brother, Sunil is a responsible and smart person. He also falls in love with Sakhi. One of Raja's friends and Shanmugam know that Raja was killed by Sakhi, but before they disclose the truth, Sakhi murders them. Sunil starts to wonder about his brother's death. What transpires next forms the rest of the story.

== Cast ==
- Devaraj as Sunil
- Divya as Sakhi
- Prabhu Sekhar as Raja
- K. Rajan as Sharma
- Meenal as Rama
- Shanmugasundaram as Shanmugam
- Karikalan
- Suryakanth
- Srilekha Rajendran as Rama's mother
- Kanishka
- Hema as Parvathy
- Seema
- Rakhi Sawant as an item number
- Ganesh Acharya in a special appearance
- Arasakumar B. T. in a cameo appearance

== Soundtrack ==
The soundtrack was composed by Pradeep Ravi, with lyrics written by Kamakodiyan and Bharathan.

Song	Singer(s)	Duration
"Sakhiye"	Anuradha Sriram, Prasanna	5:46
"Govindamma"	Sabesh	4:25
"Mama Varalama"	Annupamaa, Pradeep Kumar	4:13
"Ennadi Amma"	Sreerama Chandra Mynampati, Gopika Poornima	4:11
"Ponnana Bhoomi"	Harini	5:28

== Reception ==
A reviewer of the website Minnamutam noted, "some clichéd, loosely etched, hastily put scenes here. If one has seen Baazigar, one would find most of the scenes in the film familiar. But considering that the actors and the technicians are debutants, they have done a fairly creditable job." Malathi Rangarajan of The Hindu wrote, "Music by Pradeep Ravi is too loud. Ganesh Acharya's choreography is lively and has a youthful swing to it" and the film lacked cohesion. Malini Mannath of Chennai Online wrote, "Prabhusekhar does justice to his first major role. Devaraj shows a lot of promise. Handling a heavy role is Divya who puts in commendable efforts. If producer-distributor Rajan wants one to take his acting seriously, he had better polish his act. A couple of songs are lively (Pradip-Ravi). But what was that noise banging away in the background?".
