= Ninaikkatha Naalillai =

2001 film by A.L. Raja

- Directed by: A. L. Raja
- Written by: A. L. Raja
- Produced by: K. Rajan
- Starring: R. Parthiban; Rahman; Devayani; Kaveri
- Cinematography: R. Raghunatha Reddy
- Edited by: M. N. Raja
- Music by: Deva
- Production company: K. R. P. Production
- Release date: 7 March 2001
- Running time: 142 minutes
- Country: India
- Language: Tamil

Ninaikkaadha Naalillai (transl. Not a day without thinking) is a 2001 Indian Tamil-language drama film directed by A. L. Raja and produced by K. Rajan. The film stars R. Parthiban, Rahman, Devayani, and Kaveri.The film had musical score (soundtrack) by Deva.

== Plot ==
Anbu (R. Parthiban) and Arun (Rahman) are bosom buddies with Anbu being indebted to the wealthy Arun for various reasons. Anbu falls in love with Kavitha (Devayani), whose close friend is Kausalya (Kaveri). Arun soon develops a soft corner for Kausalya, whom he had never seen. Her lofty thoughts expressed in her letters to Kavitha had attracted him to her. Kausalya reads his messages to her sent through Kavita's letters and finds herself reciprocating to Arun's feelings. Arun has a near fatal accident and expresses his last wish to see Kavita. Anbu goes to get her, only to find her killed at the hands of the jealous suitor (Prabhukanth). With no way out, Anbu persuades Kavitha to play Kausalya so that his friend's final wish can be fulfilled. However, Arun comes out of the ordeal miraculously alive, and Kavita finds herself trapped in a situation that causes her much heartburn. How the matter is resolved with both the friends trying to play martyr forms the rest of the story.

== Cast ==
- R. Parthiban as Anbu
- Rahman as Arun
- Devayani as Kavitha
- Kaveri as Kausalya
- Vadivelu as 'Aana Oona' Townmani
- Radha Ravi as Kavitha's father
- K. Rajan as Anbu's father
- T. S. B. K. Moulee as Arun's father
- Sathyapriya as Arun's mother
- Prabhukanth as Kausalya's uncle
- M. N. Nambiar as Arun's grandfather
- S. N. Lakshmi as Arun's grandmother
- S. S. Chandran as Kavitha's grandfather
- Shanmugasundari as Kavitha's grandmother
- Shanmugasundaram as Prabhukanth's father
- Crane Manohar as Office Waiter
- Bonda Mani as Townmani's henchman
- Mayilsamy as Mayilsamy
- Ram Saravana
- Ishari K. Ganesh as Homeless man

== Soundtrack ==
Soundtrack was composed by Deva and lyrics written by Kalidasan, Ponniyin Selvan, Viveka, and Tholkappiyan.

No.	Song	Singers	Lyrics
1	Brahma Brahma	Mano, K. S. Chithra	Viveka
2	Kadhal Vaanile	P. Unnikrishnan, Saisan	Tholkappiyan
3	Meenabakkam Meenu	Sabesh, Devan	Ponniyin Selvan
4	Nilavukku Pirandhavale	Mano, Anuradha Sriram	Kalidasan

== Reception ==
Chennai Online wrote "`Ninaikkatha Naalillai` has both the love triangle and friendship factors weaved in. Neatly crafted in the first half, the film lags a little in the second, and picks up pace in the closing scenes". Cinesouth wrote "By exercising the power of attorney on behalf of friendship, they have relegated love to the background. The screenplay falters and tatters here and there. But the story has been told without creating any disgust. Parthiban has lent strength to the film by underplaying his histrionic powers to the wonderment of viewers." Indiainfo wrote "Giving a very restrained performance as the youth who sacrifices his love for friendship Parthipan has made a lasting impression in this film. A L Raja too has created a fine offbeat love story".
