= Tejashri Khele =

Indian actress

Tejashree
- Born: Sonali Jaikumar Khele
- Other name: Tejashree
- Occupations: Actress, Model
- Years active: 2003–2015

Tejashree (born Sonali Jaikumar Khele) is an Indian actress who has appeared predominantly in Tamil films. Besides, she has also acted in Telugu, Kannada, Gujarati and Marathi films.

== Filmography ==
Year	Title	Role	Language	Notes
2003	Tu Bal Bramhachari Main Hoon Kanya Kunwari	Sheetal	Hindi	
2003	Ottran	Azhagi	Tamil	
2003	Joot		Tamil	
2004	Madhurey	Maheshwari	Tamil	
2004	Donga Dongadi	Pooja	Telugu	
2004	Yours Abhi		Telugu	
2005	Rakshasa		Kannada	Special appearance
2005	Thaka Thimi Tha	Shanthi	Tamil	
2005	Neeye Nijam	Priya	Tamil	
2005	Adhu Oru Kana Kaalam		Tamil	Special appearance
2005	Kodambakkam	Reethu	Tamil	
2006	Kalvanin Kadhali		Tamil	Special appearance
2006	Vidyaarthi	Julie	Hindi	
2006	Ashoka		Kannada	
2006	Imsai Arasan 23m Pulikesi	Soolaayini	Tamil	
2006	Something Something... Unakkum Enakkum	Shalini	Tamil	
2007	Veerappu		Tamil	
2007	Naan Avanillai		Tamil	Guest appearance
2007	Arya	Pooja	Tamil	
2007	Anda Naal Nyabagam	Ritha	Tamil	
2007	Thiru Ranga	Manga	Tamil	
2007	Julayi	Manga	Telugu	
2008	Athadevaru	Swetha	Telugu	
2008	Tinnama Padukunnama, Tellarinda	Suvarna	Telugu	
2008	Nadigai	Tejashree	Tamil	
2009	Kadhalna Summa Illai		Tamil	Special appearance
2009	Brahmadeva	Sampangi	Tamil	
2012	Mayanginen Thayanginen		Tamil	
2012	Sambha Aajcha Chava	Kareena	Marathi	
2012	Teen Bayka Fajiti Aika	Pari	Marathi	
2012	Bhartiya	Mangal	Marathi	
2012	Baila Ho Baykola Kho		Marathi	
2012	Ichaar Tharla Pakka		Marathi	
2015	Paranjothi		Tamil	Special appearance
