= Villu Paatu =

Southern Indian musical storytelling form

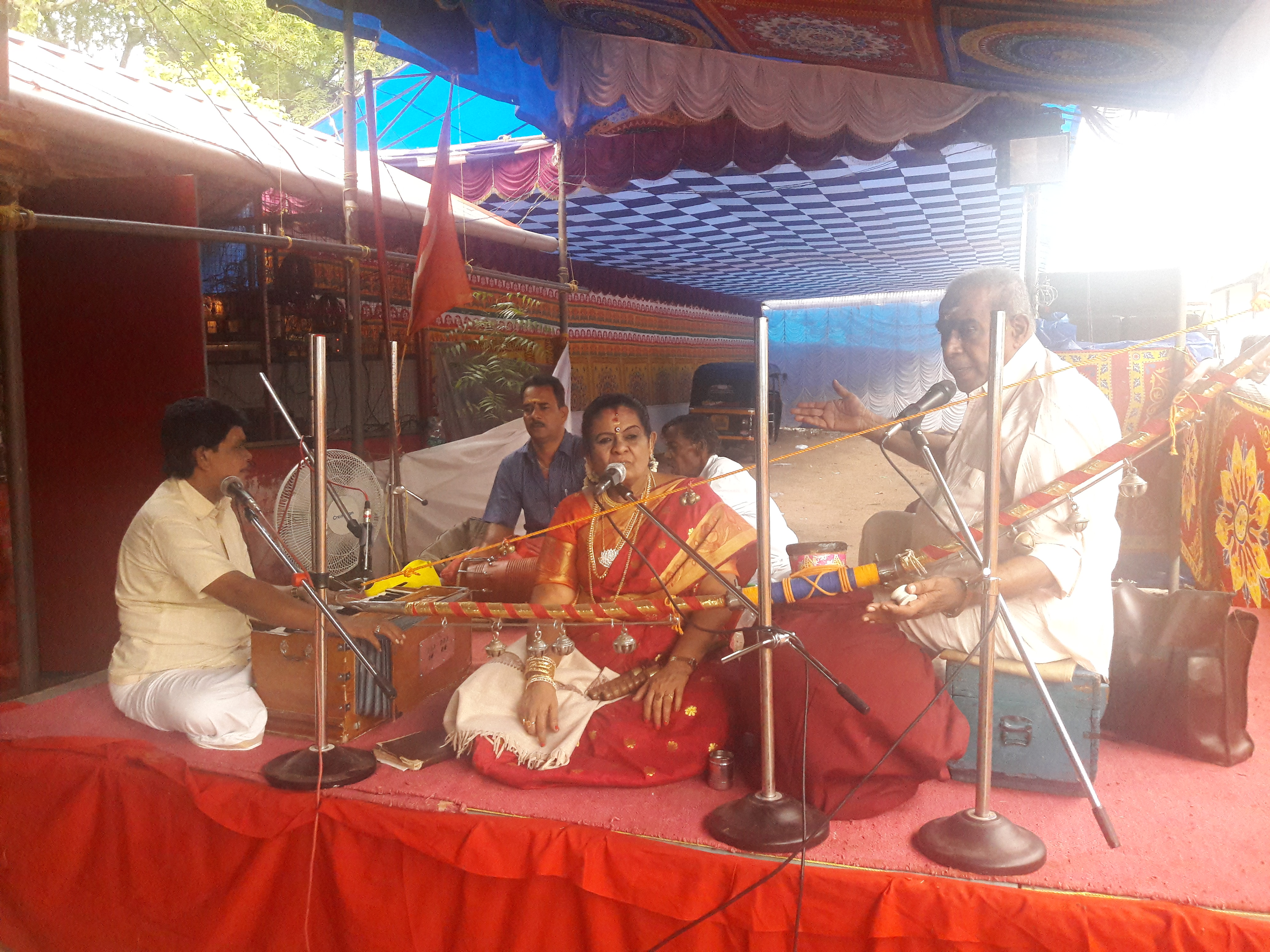
Villu Paatu (English: Bow Song, Tamil: வில்லுப்பாட்டு), also known as Villadichampaatu and Villisai, is an ancient form of musical story-telling in Southern India where narration is interspersed with music.

Villu Paatu (English: Bow Song, Tamil: வில்லுப்பாட்டு), also known as Villadichan Paatu, is an ancient form of musical story-telling method performed in Southern India, where narration is interspersed with music, an art of southern states of Tamil Nadu and Kerala, as well as North-East Sri Lanka. This art form is popular among Nadar castes of erstwhile Travancore kingdom. Simple tunes and verses make the story easy to follow. The villu (bow), the age-old weapon of warriors - paradoxically lends itself to be used as a primary musical instrument (a musical bow) for the Villu Paatu artists.

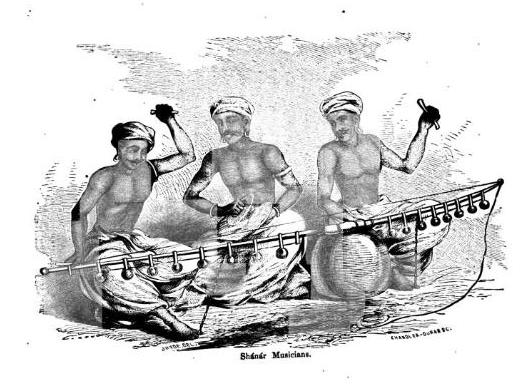
musicians from the 19th century: Performing traditional Villadichaampaatu

== Overview ==
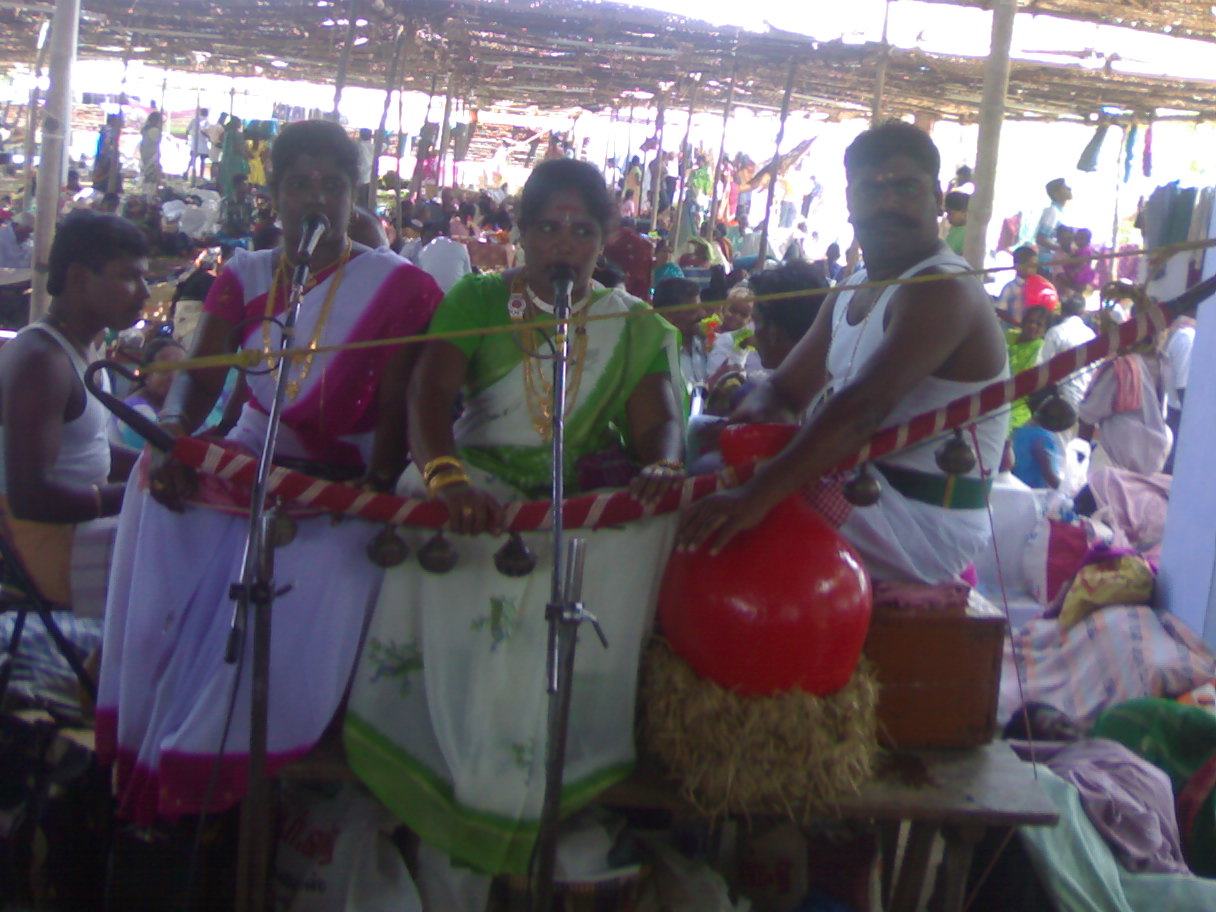
Tamil folk artists presenting a Villuppattu near Tirunelveli during a festival (Panguni Uththiram) at a Sudalai Madan temple.

In Tamil villages, performers narrate stories ranging from mythological to social. The main storyteller narrates the story striking the bow. The bow rests on the neck of a mud pot. A co-performer beats the pot while singing. There is usually another co-singer who acts as active listener to the narration, uttering appropriate oral responses. The local government sometimes utilises this as a vehicle for social messages and propaganda. Villu paatu troupes usually perform for festivals associated with deities such as Sudalai Madan, Mutharamman, Pechiamman, Isakkiamman, etc. The Villu paatu tradition is associated with the culture of southern Tamil Nadu, southern Kerala and North-East Sri Lanka.

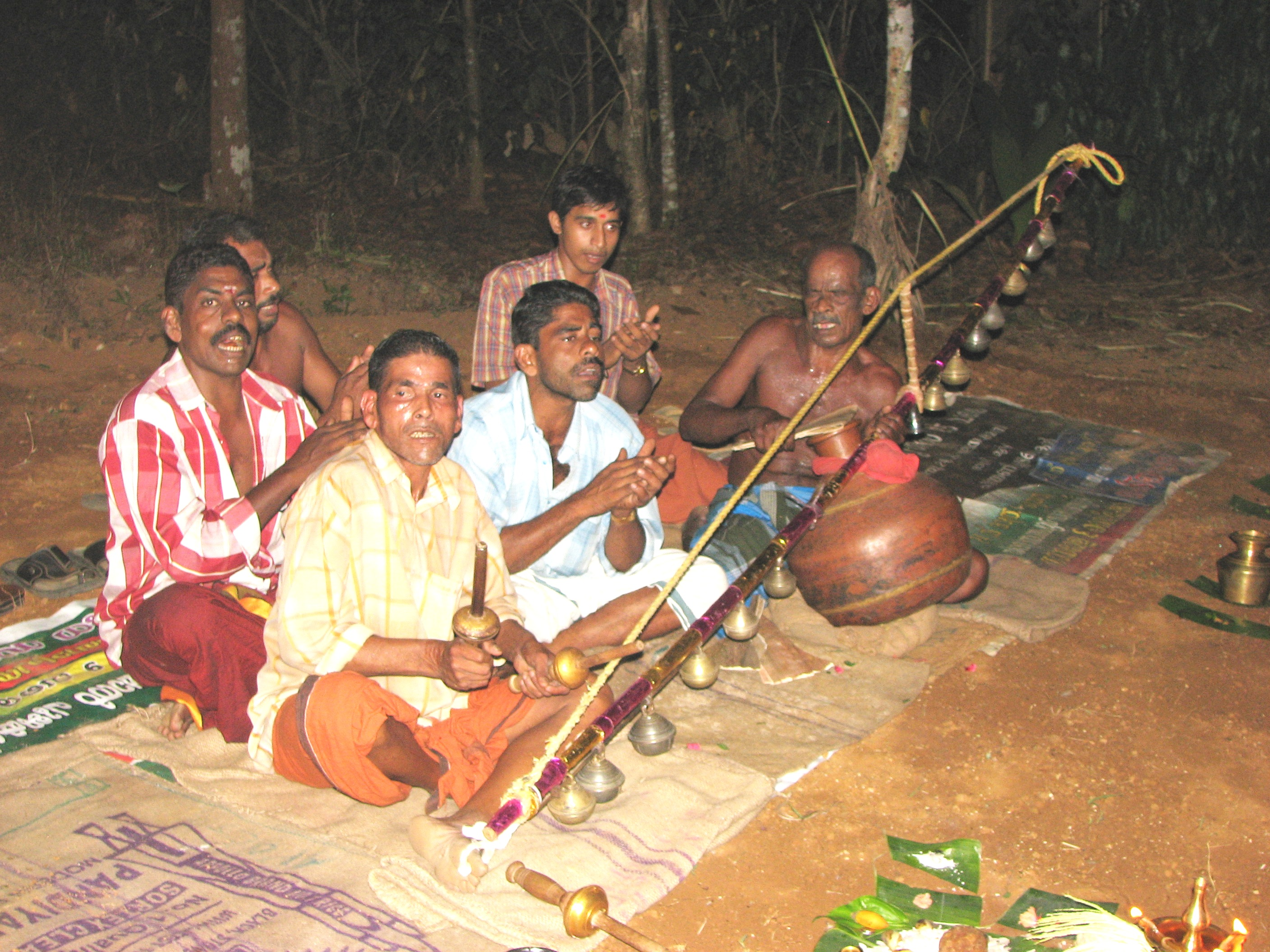
Kerala folk artists performing villupaatu. Their song is accompanied by a villadivadyam. The instrument is a "composite idiophone", made up of a long bow, bronze bells hung on it, a terra-cotta pot and sticks with jingles.

There are also Udukkai (உடுக்கை), Kudam (குடம்), Thala, Kattai(கட்டை), which are used as supplementary instruments in performances. Udukkai is a small drum with a slender middle portion which is held in the left hand and played by the fingers of the right hand. Occasionally, the Villu Paatu team divides itself into two groups, each trying to prove opposite points-of-view of a subject. This is called Lavani Paatu. The songs used by the Villu Paatu artists are mostly traditional folk-songs. They are played during occasions of temple festivals in villages. The songs sung mostly in Villu Paatu praise a god or tell a story. These days the number of artists performing Villu Paatu is tremendously reduced as the income earned from it is never enough for running one's life.

== Books ==
- Manohar Laxman Varadpande (1992). History of Indian theatre, Volume 2. Abhinav Publications. p. 125. ISBN 9788170172789.
- Source
