= Nagalingam (film) =

- Directed by: Babu Ganesh
- Written by: Babu Ganesh
- Produced by: Maragathamani
- Starring: Babu Ganesh; Ravali; Neena; Babloo Prithiveeraj
- Cinematography: C. H. Rajkumar
- Edited by: Babu Ganesh
- Music by: Babu Ganesh
- Production company: Balavignesh Creations
- Release date: 23 June 2000
- Country: India
- Language: Tamil

Nagalingam is a 2000 Indian Tamil-language devotional film written and directed by Babu Ganesh, who also starred in the title role. Apart from acting and directing, Babu Ganesh also wrote the script, composed the music and handled editing and choreography respectively. The film also starred Ravali, Neena and Babloo Prithiveeraj in leading roles.

== Cast ==
- Babu Ganesh as Nagalingam
- Ravali as Priya
- Neena as Nagakanni
- Babloo Prithiveeraj as Raja

== Production ==
The team released a press note prior to release announcing that they would be the first Tamil film to feature fragrances throughout the film. The decision was taken in a bid to curb piracy and the team revealed that they had prepared smells of rose petals, camphor, sambrani and jasmine to be released with scenes. Babu Ganesh also hoped to make the feat reach the Guinness Book of Records, and explained the trick used would be a simple adaptation of the aerosol principle. During the making of the film, actress Ravali fell out with Babu Ganesh regarding her payment. She subsequently approached the Nadigar Sangam and the organisation's president Vijayakanth helped settle her dues.

== Release and reception ==
The film was released on 23 June 2000, and the fragrance gimmick used by the producers received negative feedback from audiences. Malini Mannath of Chennai Online wrote, "A corny storyline and a narrative and scripting style that would have made any director disown the product". The film was a box office failure. Despite this, Babu Ganesh attempted to repeat the fragrance gimmick in a later film Naane Varuven (2012).
