= Radhika Chaudhari =

Indian actress

- Born: Radhika Chaudhari
- Occupations: Actress, director, producer
- Years active: 1999–2021

Radhika Chaudhari is a former Indian actress, who has worked in Hindi, Tamil, Telugu and Kannada film industries, predominantly in the early 2000s.

== Career ==
In 2010, she made a comeback of sorts as a director based in Los Angeles, and won the Silver Ace Award for Best Short Film at the Las Vegas Film Festival, for her short film Orange Blossom. The film was shot in Los Angeles in a span of four days and the 17-minute film told the story of a single mother going through the pangs of separation from her husband; while making the folly of passing on too much information about herself and her family to a few strangers. Usha Kokotay played the protagonist, while others in the cast included Jeff Doucette and John Paul Ouvrier.

== Filmography ==
=== Film ===
Year	Film	Role	Language	Notes
1999	Sambayya	Sambayya's fiancé	Telugu	
1999	Kannupada Poguthaiya	Rasathi	Tamil	
1999	Time	Priya	Tamil	
2000	Simmasanam	Revathi	Tamil	
2000	Krodham 2		Tamil	
2000	Priyamaanavale	Sowmya	Tamil	
2001	Huchhana Maduveli Undone Jana	Sangeetha	Kannada	
2001	Middle Class Madhavan	Neela Manimaran	Tamil	
2001	Ladies and Gentleman		Tamil	
2001	Kunguma Pottu Gounder		Tamil	Special appearance
2001	Nuvvu Nenu	Priya	Telugu	
2001	Paarthale Paravasam	Rekha	Tamil	
2002	Shakalaka Baby		Tamil	
2002	Tappu Chesi Pappu Koodu	Cheecha	Telugu	
2002	Nandhi	Pinki	Kannada	
2003	Khushi	Roma	Hindi	
2003	Vikadan	Bhanu Selvakumar	Tamil	
2003	Tere Naam	Dumb Beggar	Hindi	Short Scene
2003	Maa Alludu Very Good		Telugu	Special appearance
2003	Oka Pellam Muddu Rendo Pellam Vaddu		Telugu	
2003	Aithe Enti		Telugu	
2003	Mee Intikosthe Emistaaru Maa Intikoste Emi Testaaru		Telugu	
2003	Indru	Nandini	Tamil	
2004	Seenu Vasanthi Lakshmi	Divya	Telugu	
2004	En Purushan Ethir Veetu Ponnu	Parvathy	Tamil	
2010	The Hunchback		English	
2018	Sila Samayangalil		Tamil	Associate producer
2021	The Illegal	Aisha	English	

=== Television ===
Year	Title	Role	Notes
2010	Cult 11	Ms. Ravi	Episode: "Nurse Janet's Happy Place"
2011	Outsourced	Pregnant Woman	Episode: " Training Day"
