= Doubles (2000 film) =

2000 Tamil comedy film

- Directed by: Pandiarajan
- Written by: Pandiarajan
- Produced by: K. Rajan
- Starring: Prabhu Deva; Meena; Sangeetha
- Cinematography: R. Raghunatha Reddy
- Edited by: B. Lenin; V. T. Vijayan
- Music by: Srikanth Deva
- Production company: K. R. P. Production
- Release date: 11 August 2000
- Running time: 125 minutes
- Country: India
- Language: Tamil

Doubles is a 2000 Indian Tamil-language comedy film written and directed by Pandiarajan, who also played a guest appearance in the film. Produced by K. Rajan, the film stars Prabhu Deva, Meena, and Sangeetha, while Vivek, Manivannan, and Kovai Sarala play supporting roles. The film's score and soundtrack are composed by debutant Srikanth Deva. The film was released on 11 August 2000.

== Plot ==
The movie starts projecting Prabhu as a shopkeeper who sells toys to kids. He does all possible crazy actions in the world, which really irritates everyone. He has many bad habits, such as drinking and smoking. Prabhu marries Meena, but she wants her husband to be like Sree Ram. Prabhu acts as if he is a nice guy and also gets caught a few times when he tries to overact. Sangeetha, Meena's close friend, comes and stays with Meena as she is doing her final year in Madras Medical College. Prabhu had earlier touched Sangeetha's hip when she was travelling on a bus. He gets yelled at by Sangeetha and was thrown from that bus before she meets him. Sangeetha takes the task of seducing Prabhu to prove that he is a womaniser to Meena and fails in many attempts. The film ends as Meena dies of jaundice and Prabhu realising that his true love was only for Meena. Sangeetha marries Ganapathy, who comes for one scene in the ending.

== Cast ==
- Prabhu Deva as Prabhu
- Meena as Meena
- Sangeetha as Sangeetha
- Manivannan as Meena's father
- Vivek as Vivek
- Prabhukanth as Rapist
- Ishari K. Ganesh as Ramki
- Shanmugasundaram as Sangeetha's father
- S. Rajasekar as Doctor
- Kovai Sarala as Meena's mother
- Laxmi Rattan as Doctor
- Yuvan Swang as Hotel worker
- Amirthalingam as Devotee
- Sharmili as Prostitute
- Roshini as Sangeetha's friend
- T. N. Raju as Aarthi, Prabhu's friend
- Rama Rao as Prabhu's friend
- Johnny as Prabhu's friend
- Sridhar as Prabhu's friend
- Japan Kumar as Prabhu's friend
- Master Udayaraj as Vivek's son
- Shathiga as Vivek's daughter
- Deepa as Woman taking shower (uncredited role)
- Lekhasri in a special appearance
- K. Rajan in a cameo appearance
- Pandiarajan as Ganapathy (cameo appearance)

== Soundtrack ==
The soundtrack was composed by Srikanth Deva, son of music composer Deva, who made his debut as composer with this film. All lyrics were written by Vairamuthu. Indiainfo wrote the album "does not have any extraordinary songs" but Srikanth "shows a flair for mass-oriented music".

Track listing
No.	Title	Singer(s)	Length
1.	"Colourful Nilavu"	Vasundhara Das, Timmy	5:02
2.	"Hey Pondattikkum" (1)	Sukhwinder Singh, Sujatha Mohan	4:01
3.	"Hey Pondattikkum" (2)	Devan Ekambaram, Sujatha Mohan	4:01
4.	"Adi Kadhal"	P. Unnikrishnan, Harini	5:17
5.	"Rama Rama"	Swarnalatha, Anuradha Sriram	5:14
6.	"Naan Ippo"	Hariharan	4:27
Total length:			28:02

== Reception ==
Tamil Star wrote, "Pandiyarajan seems confused about how to handle Doubles. The ultimate moral he has tried to convey through the movie is that one must be faithful to one's wife. But he doesn't seem to be clear on the story to convey it through, the tone to adopt, or even the character of the hero. So we get a movie with a one-line story that is chock-full of double entendres for the most part but ends with an attempt at cheap sentiments". Krishna Chidambaram of Kalki wrote though the story is rather dull, the humorous touch throughout the film makes its presentation interesting. K. N. Vijiyan of New Straits Times called the film somewhat "disjoint" due to poor editing. Malathi Rangarajan of The Hindu wrote, "The film reminds you of a boat caught in a whirlpool, going in circles, unable to anchor. And eventually when it does it seems rather late, because by then you lose interest".
