= Babu Ganesh =

Indian actor

- Born: Tamil Nadu, India
- Occupations: Film director, actor, writer, producer, cinematographer, composer, editor, songwriter, choreographer
- Years active: 1985–present

Babu Ganesh is an Indian actor and director, who has worked in Tamil films. In his films, he has often attempted to handle as many aspects related to filmmaking — being credited for story, screenplay, dialogue, lyrics, music, singing, editing, director of photography, acting, special effects, direction, production, choreography and as a stunt choreographer.

== Career ==
Babu Ganesh made his debut directing and starring in Kadal Pura (1993), before appearing in a supporting role in Vikraman's Pudhiya Mannargal (1994). Babu Ganesh launched a big budget Tamil film titled Bharathi with Khushbu in the lead role alongside him in 1996 and the pair met with Mother Teresa to get a blessing before commencing the project. However, the film was discontinued shortly after and never released. Similarly he briefly worked with Kushboo again on R. C. Sakthi's Iththanai Naal Yengirundhaai, though the venture was ultimately not completed.

He then began work on a film titled Naan Oru Indian in 1997 opposite Vineetha featuring music by Ilaiyaraaja, but the film failed to release in theatres. He attempted to release the film in 2003 as Desiya Paravai, though to no avail later it was released in 2006 encashing on Vadivelu's popularity after the success of Imsai Arasan 23am Pulikesi. Babu Ganesh then began work on a devotional film titled Nagalingam (2000), and the film became noted for releasing a press statement prior to release claiming to be the first Tamil film which would be released in cinema halls with fragrances reflecting the scenes. The film subsequently opened in June 2000 to poor reviews and became a commercial failure. In the early 2000s, he worked on films titled Marina Beach co-starring Riva Bubber, Bommai where he was also the director, and Plus opposite Manthra. However neither film was later released. In 2002, he worked on Iravu Padagan opposite an debutant actress, Gumtaj. Babu Ganesh had insisted on giving the actress the stagename of Gumtaj, after he had earlier fell out with actress Mumtaj.

Babu Ganesh was appointed as the creative director of South Indian television channel, Win TV during 2003. In 2006, he began work on a film titled Nadigai featuring Tejashree revealing that it would highlight issues which had driven several Tamil actresses to suicide in the previous decade. Babu Ganesh played the lead role and was in charge of the film's story, screenplay, dialogues, music, and lyrics, with the venture going unnoticed. Babu Ganesh then completed a film titled Naane Varuven in 2012 with his son Rishikanth and was waiting to get a theatrical release. He is currently filming a Telugu language horror film titled Ninnu Odala with Shakeela and Tejashree, as well as a venture titled Kadal Pura with his son.

== Filmography ==
| Year | Film | Director / Writer | Producer | Cinematographer | Editor | Composer / Lyrics | Notes |
|---|---|---|---|---|---|---|---|
| 1993 | Kadal Pura | Yes | | | | | |
| 2000 | Nagalingam | Yes | Yes | Yes | Yes | Yes | |
| 2005 | Plus Koottani | Yes | Yes | | | | |
| 2006 | Desiya Paravai | Yes | No | No | No | No | |
| 2008 | Nadigai | Yes | Yes | Yes | Yes | Yes | |

=== As an actor ===
- Note: this is a list of films that he acted for other directors.

| Year | Film | Role | Notes |
|---|---|---|---|
| 1985 | Mudhal Mariyadhai | onlooker in song "Vetti Veru Vaasam" | uncredited |
| 1993 | Kadal Pura | | |
| 1994 | Pudhiya Mannargal | Pandiyan | |
| 1994 | Thaat Boot Thanjavoor | | |
| 1995 | Marina Beach | Anand | Dubbed into Telugu as Chitrangini |
| 1998 | Thulli Thirintha Kaalam | Karthik | Special appearance |
| 1999 | Guest House | | |
| 2000 | Nagalingam | Nagalingam | |
| 2001 | Theerpugal Maatrapadalaam | Ganesh | |
| 2002 | Iravu Padagan | | |
| 2002 | Police Sisters | | Telugu film |
| 2005 | Plus Koottani | | |
| 2006 | Desiya Paravai | Raja | |
| 2007 | Rasigar Mandram | Sathya | |
| 2008 | Nadigai | Albert | |
