= Ammayi Kosam =

2001 film by Muppalaneni Shiva

- Poster
- Directed by: Muppalaneni Shiva
- Written by: Marudhuri Raja (dialogues)
- Screenplay by: Muppalaneni Shiva
- Story by: Eetharam Unit, Balasekaran
- Produced by: Pokuri Baburao
- Starring: Ravi Teja; Meena; Vineeth; Sai Kumar; Ali; Siva Reddy
- Cinematography: Ch. Ramana Raju
- Edited by: Gowtham Raju
- Music by: Vandematharam Srinivas
- Production company: Eetharam films
- Release date: 18 May 2001
- Running time: 140 minutes
- Country: India
- Language: Telugu

Ammayi Kosam (transl. For the girl) is a 2001 Indian Telugu-language drama film produced by Pokuri Baburao and directed by Muppalaneni Shiva. This film stars Ravi Teja, Meena, Sai Kumar, Vineeth, Ali, and Siva Reddy in the main roles.

The story of this films revolves around four unemployed youth getting attracted to a girl and find their destination with her inspiration. The film was a remake of Tamil film Thulli Thirintha Kaalam.

== Plot ==
Venkat, Ravi, Balu and Venu are four unemployed youth who just pass their time by teasing women. Their parents keep scolding them for not being serious about their career and spoiling their name. A girl named Anjali moves into a neighboring house along with her family. After these four friends tried to tease her, instead of taking offense, she reciprocate the same with them. They later become good friends.

Anjali recognizes that each of the four friends has a unique talent. Venkat writes good poetry, Ravi is a bike racer, Balu has exemplary culinary skills and Venu is skilled at mimicry. She encourages them to improve their skills in their respective fields. On her birthday, all of them present a gift to her, after stealing something from their homes to propose their love. She accepts all four proposals and promise each to marry them only if they return after becoming successful in their career. They work hard and settle in their careers. When they return, actually wanting to marry her, they realize that she is marrying someone else, an army man. They try to stop the marriage accusing her of cheating them. Anjali's father reveals their flashback about how he lost his son because of not guiding him properly. Anjali did not want to see anyone to meet the same fate as her brother and diverted their energies to excel in their careers, in the name of love. The story ends with the four friends realizing Anjali's greatness and performing her marriage with the army man.

== Cast ==
- Ravi Teja as Ravi
- Meena as Anjali
- Vineeth as Venkat
- Ali as Balu
- Siva Reddy as Venu
- Prakash Raj as Anjali's father, train driver
- Sudha as Anjali's mother
- Sai Kumar as Anjali's brother
- Jayaprakash Reddy as police inspector
- Narra Venkateswara Rao as Ravi's father, a bike mechanic
- M. S. Narayana as Yallamanda, Balu's father, a chef
- L. B. Sriram as Hanumayya, Venu's father, a washerman
- Alapati Lakshmi as Venkat's mother
- Varsha as Venkat's sister
- Master Mahendra as tea supplier boy
- Dharmavarapu Subrahmanyam as Anjali's brother's interviewer

== Production ==
The Telugu remake of Thulli Thirintha Kaalam began production in the end of 1998 with Editor Mohan as the producer starring Vadde Naveen and Raasi.

== Music ==
Vandemataram Srinivas composed music for this film. This album has six songs. Sirivennela Seetarama Sastri, Samavedam Shanmukha Sarma, Bhuvana Chandra, Chandrabose penned the lyrics. S. P. Balasubrahmanyam, K. S. Chitra, Unni Krishnan, Swarnalatha, Sonu Nigam, Udit Narayan, Hariharan, Vandemataram sang the tracks.

No.	Title	Lyrics	Singer(s)	Length
1.	"Chandini"	Samavedam Shanmukha Sarma	Udit Narayan, Swarnalata	4:22
2.	"Ding Dong"	Chandrabose	Sonu Nigam, Timmy	5:06
3.	"Anjali"	Bhuvana Chandra	Hariharan	8:15
4.	"Vedana Vedana"	Sirivennela Seetharama Sastry	S. P. Balasubrahmanyam	4:08
5.	"B.A lu chadivina"	Samavedam Shanmukha Sarma	S. P. Balasubrahmanyam, K. S. Chitra, Vandemataram Srinivas	4:25
6.	"Oho hatsoff"	Ghantadi Krishna	P. Unnikrishnan	3:05

== Reception ==
Idlebrain wrote "First half of the film is full of fun and frolic. The second half tends to become little serious before ending up with a superb climax". Andhra Today wrote "Although, the story may not sound new, power-packed scenes combined with forceful dialogue signify that the movie will make a niche for itself. To fit today's trend, the director attempts to make the screen-play an entertaining one, even though it may not look great".
