= Suryavamsam (1998 film) =

1998 film by Bhimaneni Srinivasa Rao

- Theatrical release poster
- Directed by: Bhimaneni Srinivasa Rao
- Written by: Marudhuri Raja (dialogues)
- Screenplay by: Bhimaneni Srinivasa Rao
- Story by: Vikraman
- Based on: Suryavamsam (Tamil)
- Produced by: R. B. Choudary
- Starring: Venkatesh; Meena
- Cinematography: Y. Mahendra
- Edited by: Gautham Raju
- Music by: S. A. Rajkumar
- Production company: Super Good Films
- Release date: 25 February 1998
- Running time: 163 minutes
- Country: India
- Language: Telugu

Suryavamsam (transl. Solar dynasty) is a 1998 Indian Telugu-language drama film directed by Bhimaneni Srinivasa Rao, and produced by R. B. Choudary under Super Good Films. It stars Venkatesh and Meena, with a soundtrack composed by S. A. Rajkumar. The film is the Telugu remake of the Tamil film Surya Vamsam (1997). The film was a blockbuster at the box office.

== Plot ==
Harischandra Prasad, the arbitrator and most respected person in a village, sees to it that all the people live happily. He and Singaraju Lingaraju have a strong enmity. He is the only opponent of Harishchandra in the village, as Harishchandra punished him for trying to molest a woman. Harischandra has a big family with his wife Vasundhara, three sons Ravi Prasad, Divakar Prasad, and Bhanu Prasad, a daughter Shanti, two daughters-in-law, and two granddaughters. Harischandra hates his third son, Bhanu, but Bhanu is a devoted and benevolent son to his father. Bhanu is forced to do menial household work and has virtually no relationships with his family, except for his mother.

Swapna arrives for her brother's wedding to Bhanu's sister. In the beginning, she thinks Bhanu is a servant and looks down on him. After some time, she knows the fact and asks Bhanu's friend Nukaraju about Bhanu's life, when he reveals Bhanu's past. As a child, Bhanu was poor in studies to the extent that he remained illiterate, which is why Harischandra Prasad dislikes him. He falls in love with Madhavi. Without Madhavi's consent, the wedding is fixed with Harischandra Prasad's approval. Before the wedding, Madhavi attempts suicide to escape from being married to Bhanu, as she did not want to unite with an illiterate man. To prevent any misunderstandings, Bhanu declared that he was not interested in Madhavi and earned his father's wrath. After listening to Bhanu's story, Swapna falls in love with him. Even though Bhanu isn't interested initially, he eventually accepts her love.

Meanwhile, Singaraju makes a plan to have Swapna marry his son. Swapna's parents, particularly her mother, accept the proposal. However, Swapna declares her love for Bhanu and tells Bhanu to marry her or else she will commit suicide. Her wedding is fixed, but Bhanu crashes the wedding and takes Swapna and marries her. Both of them return, much to the rage of both parents. Harischandra Prasad banishes Bhanu from the house, and he and Swapna start living on the village outskirts. Bhanu got a job in a bus transport company and bluffs Swapna that he got a job as an assistant owner. Incidentally, they come across Madhavi, who insults their lifestyle, so Bhanu decides to grow up and prove himself. He declares that he will make Swapna an IAS officer. He is caught after Swapna and her uncle find out about his odd job, and her uncle advises him to drive a bus and make a living. Swapna teaches him reading, writing, and some arithmetic, while she pursues her own I.A.S. studies. Over time, due to hard work, Bhanu Prasad gradually becomes one of the biggest businessmen in the town and Swapna the District Collector. They have a fine young son, Jr. Harischandra Prasad. At one point, Madhavi requests that Bhanu allow her husband to work in his factory, as his business suffered a loss, which Bhanu agrees to. Swapna explains to Madhavi the true humility and how Bhanu worked hard.

Harischandra incidentally comes across his grandson and develops a secret friendly relationship with him, meeting him regularly. Knowing this, Bhanu and Swapna also feel very happy. One day, Bhanu gives his son some canned Payasam (rice pudding) to be offered to his father. When Harischandra is diverted, Singaraju mixes poison in it. Vasundhara learns of the secret meeting of Harischandra with his grandson and urges him to accept Bhanu back into their family. During the conversation, Harischandra takes the payasam and is hospitalized. As a result, Bhanu is suspected of attempting his father's life in outrage.

At the hospital, Singaraju makes a scene to frame Bhanu and show evidence that Bhanu is the culprit. When he and his men badly beat Bhanu, Harischandra intervenes and arrives to his son's rescue. Harischandra declares that Singaraju had poisoned the "Payasam", which he realized due to the smell of Singaraju's perfume in his car. A combat ensues between Harischandra/Bhanu and Singaraju until the latter confesses his guilt, and Bhanu spares his life. Finally, Harischandra accepts Bhanu as his son, and the entire family is happily reunited.

== Cast ==
- Venkatesh in a dual role as
  - Harischandra Prasad (father)
  - Bhanu Prasad (son)
- Meena as Swapna, Bhanuprasad's wife, Jr. Harichandra Prasad's mother, Sr. Harischandra Prasad, and Vasundhara's daughter-in-law
- Master Aanand Vardhan as Jr. Harichandra Prasad, Bhanu Prasad, and Swapna's son, Sr.Harischandra Prasad, and Vasundhara's grandson
- Radhika as Vasundhara, Sr. Harischandra Prasad's wife, Bhanuprasad's mother
- Sanghavi as Madhavi, Bhanu Prasad ex-fiance
- Satyanarayana as Justice Dakshana Murthy: Swapna's father; Bhanuprasad father-in-law; Jr.Harischandra Prasad' maternal grand-father
- Anandaraj as Singaraju Lingaraju
- Kota Srinivasa Rao as Major Yeddulayya
- Sudhakar as Gudimetla Nukaraju
- Ali as Devadasu
- Mallikarjuna Rao as Dr. Neecham
- Nutan Prasad as Judge
- P. L. Narayana as Narayana
- Raja Ravindra as Venu Gopal
- Maharshi Raghava as Diwakar Prasad; Sr. Harischandra Prasad & Vasundhara's second son, Bhanu Prasad's elder brother, Jr.Harischandra Prasad's uncle
- Ashok Kumar as Drama director
- Banerjee as Inspector
- Varsha
- Kallu Chidambaram
- Bandla Ganesh as a passenger
- Tirupathi Prakash
- Vinod as Ravi Prasad: Sr. Harischandra Prasad & Vasundhara's elder son, Bhanu Prasad's elder brother, Jr. Harischandra Prasad's uncle
- Jaya Bhaskar as SP
- Prasanna Kumar as Paidibabu
- Satti Babu
- Junior Relangi
- Gadiraju Subba Rao
- Chandra Mouli
- Sathyapriya as Justice Dakshana Murthy's wife
- Sana as Ravi Prasad's wife, Sr. Harischandra Prasad & Vasundhara's elder daughter-in-law, Ravi Prasad wife, Bhanu Prasad's sister-in-law, Jr.Harischandra Prasad' aunt
- Rajitha as Devakar Prasad's wife, Sr. Harischandra Prasad & Vasundhara's 2nd daughter-in-law, Devakar Prasad wife, Bhanu Prasad's sister-in-law, Jr. Harischandra Prasad's aunt
- Annuja as a Bus conductor
- Venu Madhav
- Ali as an actor in a play

== Soundtrack ==
Suryavamsam

Film score by S. A. Rajkumar
- Released: 1998
- Genre: Soundtrack
- Length: 26:17
- Label: Aditya Music
- Producer: S. A. Rajkumar

S. A. Rajkumar chronology
Suswagatham (1998)	Suryavamsam (1998)	Sneham Kosam (1999)

Music for the film was composed by S. A. Rajkumar and was released on Aditya Music. Except for the song "Kadhala" which was replaced with a new tune "Kila Kila Navve", which is set in Shuddha Dhanyasi raga, other songs from the original were retained. "Kila Kila Navve" would later be reused as "Thodu Thodu Enavae Vanavil" in the 1999 Tamil film Thullatha Manamum Thullum and as "Thanana Thanana" in 2005 Kannada film Varsha.

No.	Title	Lyrics	Singer(s)	Length
1.	"Rojave Chinni (M)"	Shanmukha Sarma	Hariharan	4:14
2.	"Kila Kila Navve"	E.S. Murthy	K.S. Chithra, S.P. Balu	4:44
3.	"Adugo Maharaju"	Sirivennela Sitarama Sastry	S.P. Balu	4:22
4.	"Chukkalanni"	Sirivennela Sitarama Sastry	S.P. Balu, Sujatha Mohan	4:53
5.	"Jhalaku Jhalaku"	Bhuvanachandra	S.P. Balu, Swarnalatha	4:01
6.	"Rojave Chinni (F)"	Shanmukha Sarma	K.S. Chithra	3:55
7.	"Rojave Chinni (Sad)"	Shanmukha Sarma	Jayachandran
8.	"Chukkalanni (Bit)"	Sirivennela Sitarama Sastry	Mano, Sujatha Mohan
Total length:				26:17
