= Suswagatham =

1998 film by Bhimaneni Srinivasa Rao

- Poster
- Directed by: Bhimaneni Srinivasa Rao
- Written by: Chintapalli Ramana (dialogues)
- Screenplay by: Bhimaneni Srinivasa Rao
- Story by: Balasekaran
- Based on: Love Today (Tamil)
- Produced by: R. B. Choudary
- Starring: Pawan Kalyan; Devayani
- Cinematography: Mahindar
- Edited by: Gautham Raju
- Music by: S. A. Rajkumar
- Production company: Super Good Combines
- Release date: 1 January 1998
- Running time: 150 minutes
- Country: India
- Language: Telugu

Suswagatham (transl. Hearty welcome) is a 1998 Indian Telugu-language romance film produced by R. B. Choudary under the Super Good Combines banner, directed by Bhimaneni Srinivasa Rao. It stars Pawan Kalyan and Devayani (in her Telugu debut), with music composed by S. A. Rajkumar. The film is a remake of the Tamil film Love Today (1997). The film was a blockbuster at the box office.

Kalyan was first credited with the title Power Star in this film. Suswagatham sowed the seeds for Kalyan's rise to stardom. In the film, Kalyan played a young man who loses everything due to his blind love for a girl. His performance in the film was critically acclaimed. Pawan Kalyan, Bhimaneni Srinivasa Rao, and R. B. Choudary later collaborated for Annavaram (2006).

== Plot ==
Ganesh (Pawan Kalyan), a college graduate has been following a college girl, Sandhya for the past four years, trying to express his love. Though Sandhya had often warned Ganesh not to follow her, he still does. Ganesh's friend Peter (Karan) introduces him to Sandhya's friend (Sadhika), who tries to help him with his love, but fails. Ganesh, on his birthday, tries to express his love to Sandhya, but is caught by her father (Prakash Raj), who is a police officer, who puts him away for harassing his daughter. Later, Ganesh's father, Dr. Chandrashekhar, a reputed psychologist (Raghuvaran) bails him out. Ganesh's father and him are very close to each other as he had lost his mother in his childhood. Despite being lenient, his father asks him and his friends to work and get settled. One day, Ganesh emotionally states to his father that he badly needs Sandhya and he agrees to take the proposal.

Ganesh's father goes to Sandhya's father with a marriage proposal for him. But Sandhya's father, as usual arrogant, insults him. He then decides to take his daughter and his wife to his sister's house in Hyderabad, but changes his mind in the bus. Ganesh thinks Sandhya is in Hyderabad and goes to search for her. Meanwhile, Ganesh's father dies the same day he had left, in a road mishap after he witnesses a boy committing suicide because his girlfriend had left him. Ganesh's friends desperately try to trace his whereabouts, but they cannot find him. Peter ends up performing the last rites of Ganesh's father. Ganesh arrives and is heartbroken that he could not even perform his father's cremation.

Sandhya now realises her love for Ganesh. She reveals her feelings for him and tells him that she wants to spend the rest of her life with him and asks to wait at the regular bus stop. But Ganesh rejects her love and tells her that he had lost four years of his life and his father for her love and says that she is not worth it. The next day, Sandhya still waits at the bus stop for him to come. Ganesh's friends start a restaurant with his father's name and Ganesh attends the job interview suggested by his father.

== Cast ==
- Pawan Kalyan as Ganesh
- Devayani as Sandhya
- Raghuvaran as Dr. Chandrashekhar, Ganesh' father
- Prakash Raj as Inspector Vasudeva Rao (Monarch)
- Saadhika Randhawa as Kala
- Karan as Peter
- Sudhakar as Shanmuka Sharma
- Tirupathi Prakash as Ekbal
- Bandla Ganesh as Gaidoda
- Sudha as Krishnaveni
- Varsha as Fathema
- Y. Vijaya as Kala's mother
- Pavala Syamala
- Venu Madhav
- Naveen as Naveen
- Madhavi Sri
- Saadhika

== Production ==
For the scene where his father dies, Pawan Kalyan slapped himself repeatedly to feel emotional. The shot took forty takes.

== Soundtrack ==
Suswagatham

Film score by S. A. Rajkumar
- Released: 1998
- Genre: Soundtrack
- Length: 28:29
- Label: Aditya Music
- Producer: S. A. Rajkumar

S. A. Rajkumar chronology
Subhakankshalu (1997)	Suswagatham (1998)	Suryavamsam (1998)

Music composed by S. A. Rajkumar. The song "Suswagatham Navaragama" is based on "Sollamale Yaar Parthathu" from Poove Unakkaga (1996).

No.	Title	Lyrics	Singer(s)	Length
1.	"Ye Swapnalokala"	Sirivennela Sitarama Sastry	S. P. Balasubrahmanyam	4:46
2.	"Happy Happy"	Shanmukha Sharma	P.Jayachandran, Mano	4:50
3.	"Suswagatham Navaragama"	Shanmukha Sharma	Hariharan, K. S. Chithra	4:16
4.	"Figure Maata"	Bhuvanachandra	Mano, SA Rajkumar	5:06
5.	"Come Come"	Shanmukha Sharma	S. A. Rajkumar, Anuradha Sriram	4:54
6.	"Aalayana Harathilo"	Sirivennela Sitarama Sastry	S. P. Balasubrahmanyam	4:26
Total length:				28:29

== Reception ==
A critic from Andhra Today rated the film three out of five stars and opined, "For a movie with a love theme, it is an outstanding one in many ways - particularly the end which is unique. Prakash Raj`s histrionics as the sadistic father and Raghuvaran as the loving father deserve special mention".
