= Kya Yehi Pyaar Hai =

2002 film

- DVD cover
- Directed by: K. Murali Mohana Rao
- Written by: Javed Siddiqui
- Story by: Balasekaran
- Based on: Love Today (Tamil)
- Produced by: Allu Aravind; Kumar S. Taurani; Ramesh S. Taurani; Mukesh Udeshi
- Starring: Aftab Shivdasani; Ameesha Patel; Jackie Shroff; Ashish Vidyarthi
- Cinematography: Chota K. Naidu
- Edited by: K. Ravi Kumar
- Music by: Songs: Sajid–Wajid; Score: Sanjoy Choudhary
- Production companies: Tips Industries; Geetha Arts
- Release date: 22 March 2002
- Running time: 176 minutes
- Country: India
- Language: Hindi
- Box office: ₹11.36 crore

Kya Yehi Pyaar Hai (transl. Is this what love is?) is a 2002 Indian Hindi-language musical romantic drama film directed by K. Murali Mohana Rao, starring Jackie Shroff, Aftab Shivdasani and Ameesha Patel in lead roles, with cinematography by Chota K. Naidu. It is a remake of the 1997 Tamil film, Love Today.

== Plot ==
Rahul Tiwari is in love with Sandhya Patil — and has been for the last four years without having the courage to tell her. He follows her everywhere, even waiting to board the public bus until she has. Sandhya is not even aware of Rahul, let alone his affection for her. One day, Rahul finds out where Sandhya lives, along with the fact that her father is Police Inspector Raj Patil "Raja", a cruel, sadistic, drunk, and abusive man whose wife Rachna and daughter live in fear, even in his absence. Raj Patil has no respect for any human being, regardless of them being his superiors, his subordinates, or even members of the public whom he has sworn to protect. When Raj finds out that Rahul is trying to enter the life of his daughter, he arrests him publicly, beats him up, and locks him in a cell in his police station.

Rahul's older brother, Dr. Kamlakar Tiwari, arranges to get him out of jail with the help of Rahul's friends. Kamlakar hopes that this situation will have taught Rahul a lesson. However, it is of no avail as Rahul continues obsessing over Sandhya regardless of her indifference. Indeed, Sandhya has made it clear to Rahul and his college friend, Neha, that she is only interested in pursuing her education and not interested in him at all. Fearing Rahul's next move, Raj tells his wife and daughter that they are to leave the city immediately and move to Hyderabad, where his older sister resides, only to change his mind on the bus. Not being aware of this change of plan, Rahul heads to Hyderabad to seek Sandhya. Meanwhile, Kamlakar is in the hospital trying to save a young man who has consumed poison but fails; the man's friend tells Kamlakar he committed suicide because the girl he loved for the past three years rejected him.

Fearing that Rahul would do the same thing as that young man, a distracted Kamlakar rushes to stop Rahul from boarding a bus to Hyderabad, only to end up losing his own life in a car accident. Rahul eventually rushes home upon finding out about his older brother's death, only to see that he has just missed Kamlakar's cremation which was performed by his friend Peter. Distraught, Rahul realizes that he has sacrificed four years of his life as well as his brother on one-sided feelings. Sandhya is confronted by Neha who makes her realise Rahul's love for her and Sandhya, overwhelmed with the recent events, later meets Rahul and tells him she now loves him.

However, a now matured Rahul rejects her so that both of them can focus on their future and tells her that he lost everything due to unrequited love and could not even do his brother's last rites; therefore, it is not worth it. Nevertheless, the following day, Sandhya is seen standing at the same bus stop Rahul used to wait for her at, waiting for Rahul to come. Meanwhile, Rahul takes the recommendation that Kamlakar had written for him before his death and goes for his first job interview, with the support of his friends.

== Cast ==
- Aftab Shivdasani as Rahul Tiwari
- Amisha Patel as Sandhya Patil
- Jackie Shroff as Kamlakar Tiwari
- Ashish Vidyarthi as Raj Patil 'Raja'
- Neena Kulkarni as Rachna
- Anupama Verma as Neha
- Vrajesh Hirjee as Sundar
- Sarfaraz Khan as Peter

== Soundtrack ==
Kya Yehi Pyaar Hai

Soundtrack album by Sajid–Wajid
- Released: 13 December 2001
- Genre: Feature film soundtrack With Jhankaar Beatz
- Length: 51:15
- Label: Tips
- Producer: TIPS Jhankaar Beats

Lyrics written by Jalees Rashid and Ajay Jhingran.

All music is composed by Sajid-Wajid.

No.	Title	Singer(s)	Length
1.	"Dil Ki Nazar Mein (Female)"	Alka Yagnik	5:07
2.	"Dil Ki Nazar Mein (Male)"	Kumar Sanu	5:07
3.	"Dil Pe Chaane Laga"	K.K., Sunidhi Chauhan	3:45
4.	"O Mahive"	Sonu Nigam	5:13
5.	"Pehli Pehli Baar Hai"	Alka Yagnik, Sonu Nigam	5:34
6.	"Meri Tarah Tum Bhi"	Alka Yagnik, Babul Supriyo	4:56
7.	"Aashiq Hoon (Deewana Mujhe Kehta Hai Sara Jamana)"	Sonu Nigam	5:05
8.	"Sochoon Tumhein"	Kumar Sanu	2:15
9.	"Tujhe Dekhkar Jeeta"	Alka Yagnik, Kumar Sanu, Sonu Nigam	6:52
10.	"Chahtoon Kee Duniya (Qawali)"	Iqbal, Afzal	7:21
Total length:			51:15

== Critical response ==
Taran Adarsh of Bollywood Hungama gave the film 1 star out of 5, writing, "On the whole, Kya Yehi Pyaar Hain is a weak film in all respects and despite the excellent promotion by its producers, the film will not find many takers. Below average." Sukanya Verma of Rediff.com wrote, "Aftab is likeable as the infatuated college kid; a tad out of place in the heavy duty emotional scenes. Amisha Patel looks like a dream, but her tendency to mouth dialogues as if she were reciting Shakespeare's sonnets are not amusing. Jackie Shroff takes over every scene he appears in with charm and grace. At times irritatingly loud and comical at others, Ashish Vidhyarti evokes mixed feelings. However, decent performances do not a film make."

=== Box office ===
Kya Yehi Pyaar Hai collected ₹11.36 crore at the worldwide box office. In India, it collected ₹7.58 crore nett (₹10.53 crore Gross) and in overseas, it grossed ₹0.83 cr.
