= Mr. Nookayya =

2012 Indian Telugu-language action comedy film

- Theatrical release poster
- Directed by: Ani Kanneganti
- Written by: Ani Kanneganti
- Screenplay by: Ani Kanneganti
- Dialogue by: Paruchuri Brothers
- Produced by: Master Bujji Babu; D. S. Rao
- Starring: Manoj Manchu; Kriti Kharbanda; Sana Khan
- Cinematography: B. Rajasekar
- Edited by: Naveen Cuts; M. R. Varma (1 song)
- Music by: Songs: Yuvan Shankar Raja; Score: S. Chinna
- Production company: Shri Shailendra Cinemas
- Release date: 8 March 2012
- Running time: 140 minutes
- Country: India
- Language: Telugu

Mr. Nookayya (originally titled Mr. Nokia and later released as Mr. Nookayya Re-loaded) is a 2012 Indian Telugu-language action comedy film written and directed by Ani Kanneganti, produced by D. S. Rao under Shri Shailendra Cinemas banner. It stars Manoj Manchu, Kriti Kharbanda, and Sana Khan. The film's soundtrack is composed by Yuvan Shankar Raja, while cinematography is handled by B. Rajasekar. Dialogues were written by the duo Paruchuri brothers.

The film was released worldwide on 8 March 2012. Upon release, the film ran into trouble as the telecommunications company Nokia filed a suit against the use of its registered trademark. The film was then re-edited and re-released nine days later as Mr. Nookayya Reloaded.

== Plot ==
Nookayya (Manoj Manchu), who calls himself Nokia, is an expert cell phone thief. He has a good heart, though, and together with his friends Nampally (Paruchuri Venkateswara Rao) and Charger (Vennela Kishore), he takes care of orphans and abandoned children. He is deeply in love with Shilpa (Sana Khan), who is a waitress in a pub. Shilpa wants Nokia to settle down in life with a nice car, much cash, and a house in order to marry. A desperate Nokia starts hunting for ways to achieve these things in life.

On a separate note, Anu (Kriti Kharbanda), a bank manager, and Kiran (Raja) are a newly married couple. On a trip to Bangalore, Kiran is kidnapped by a gang headed by Shajahan Bismil (Murali Sharma), and they demand a ransom of two crores. Anu then takes the demanded ransom amount from the bank in secret and escapes.

In a curious twist of fate, the paths of both Nokia and Anu cross, and the money is taken by Charger, which is revealed in the end. In the meantime, Shilpa leaves Nookayya and dates another man. Nokia and Anu team up to save themselves and Kiran. After many twists, dead ends and chases, it is revealed that Kiran planned his kidnap with Shajahan for the sake of money. In fact, he had cheated Anu by pretending to be in love and marrying her. In the climax, Nokia is beaten badly by Kiran, who wants to kill Anu. In a fit of anger, Nokia kills Kiran, Shajahan, and their henchmen. It is shown that Anu returns the money in the bank and becomes a good friend of Nokia, but she also gives the proposal for him to marry her.

== Cast ==
- Manoj Manchu as Nookayya "Nokia"
- Kriti Kharbanda as Anuradha "Anu"
- Sana Khan as Shilpa
- Raja Abel as Kiran
- Murali Sharma as Shajahan Bismil
- Brahmanandam as Rahul
- Vennela Kishore as Charger
- Brahmaji as Raja
- Saptagiri as Raja's assistant
- Raghu Babu as Raghu
- Ahuti Prasad as Local MP
- Prabhas Sreenu MP's cousin
- Bhavana
- Allari Subhashini

== Production ==
In February 2011, Manoj Manchu signed a new film with Anil Krishna, who had directed the films Asadhyudu and Junction, and to be produced by D. S. Rao, who had made several films including Drona and Kalavar King. On 7 March 2011, the film was launched with a ceremonial Puja ceremony, with Paruchuri Brothers who wrote the dialogues for the film, handing over the bounded script to the director. On 21 March 2011, the muhurat was held at Ramanaidu Studios in Hyderabad and shooting began. The chief guest V. V. Vinayak tapped the clapperboard while Ravindranath switched on the camera. On 25 April 2011, the title Mr. Nokia was registered for the film at the Film Chamber. Manoj Manchu claimed that the director and producer had planned for 75 days film shooting, but since they were following a bound script, the shooting schedule was reduced to 45 days. Producer of the film, D.S. Rao announced that the title of the film was changed from Mr. Nokia to Mr. Nookayya due to undisclosed reasons. A reason for this is that the Finnish multinational communications corporation Nokia Communications contacted the producers concerning the use of their registered trademark in the film's name and got a court order that forbade the producers to use the title Nokia or identical or deceptively similar title.

=== Casting ===
Manoj Manchu was first insistent on Nithya Menen being signed as the female lead. Pranitha of Baava fame was reported to play another lead female character. The producer roped in Kriti Kharbanda, who shot to fame after the release of Theenmaar. According to sources, the producers dropped her on the third day of the shoot, since she "threw starry tantrums".

== Soundtrack ==
Mr. Nookayya

Soundtrack album to Mr. No Keyia by Yuvan Shankar Raja
- Released: 19 January 2012
- Recorded: 2011
- Genre: Feature film soundtrack
- Length: 32:19
- Language: Telugu
- Label: Aditya Music
- Producer: Yuvan Shankar Raja

Yuvan Shankar Raja chronology
Vettai (2012)	Mr. Nookayya (2012)	Billa II (2012)

The soundtrack of the film was composed by Yuvan Shankar Raja, which happens to be his second Manoj Manchu project after Raju Bhai. During the launch of the film, Yuvan Shankar had already tuned two of the songs, while the lead actor Manoj Manchu has also written lyrics for one of the songs. The album consists of seven songs from Yuvan Shankar Raja's earlier Tamil releases, with varied orchestrations. The soundtrack album was released on 19 January 2012 under its tentative title Mr. No Keyia at Rock Heights, HITEC City, Madhapur in Hyderabad, with several prominent film personalities present.

Track listing
No.	Title	Lyrics	Artist(s)	Length
1.	"No. Keyia" ("Who Am I" from Vaanam)	Ramajogayya Shastry	Ranjith	03:59
2.	"Oke Oka Jeevitham" ("Oru Naalil" from Tamil film Pudhupettai)	Ramajogayya Shastry	Haricharan	06:04
3.	"Pista Pista" ("Evandi Unna Pethan" from Vaanam)	Manoj Manchu	Karthik, Yuvan Shankar Raja	05:42
4.	"Pranam Poye Badha" ("Uyir Piriyum Valiyai" from Kalvanin Kadhali)	Manoj Manchu	Yuvan Shankar Raja	02:44
5.	"No Money No Honey" ("No Money No Honey" from Vaanam)	Ramajogayya Shastry	Karthik, Premgi Amaren	04:49
6.	"Ye Janma Bandhamo" ("Nenjodu" song from Kaadhal Kondein)	Lakshmi Bhupal	Ranjith, Priya Hemesh	05:29
7.	"Theme of No. Keyia" ("Cable Raja" Theme from Vaanam)	Lakshmi Bhupal	Blaaze	03:30
Total length:				32:19
