= Manchu Manoj =

Indian actor

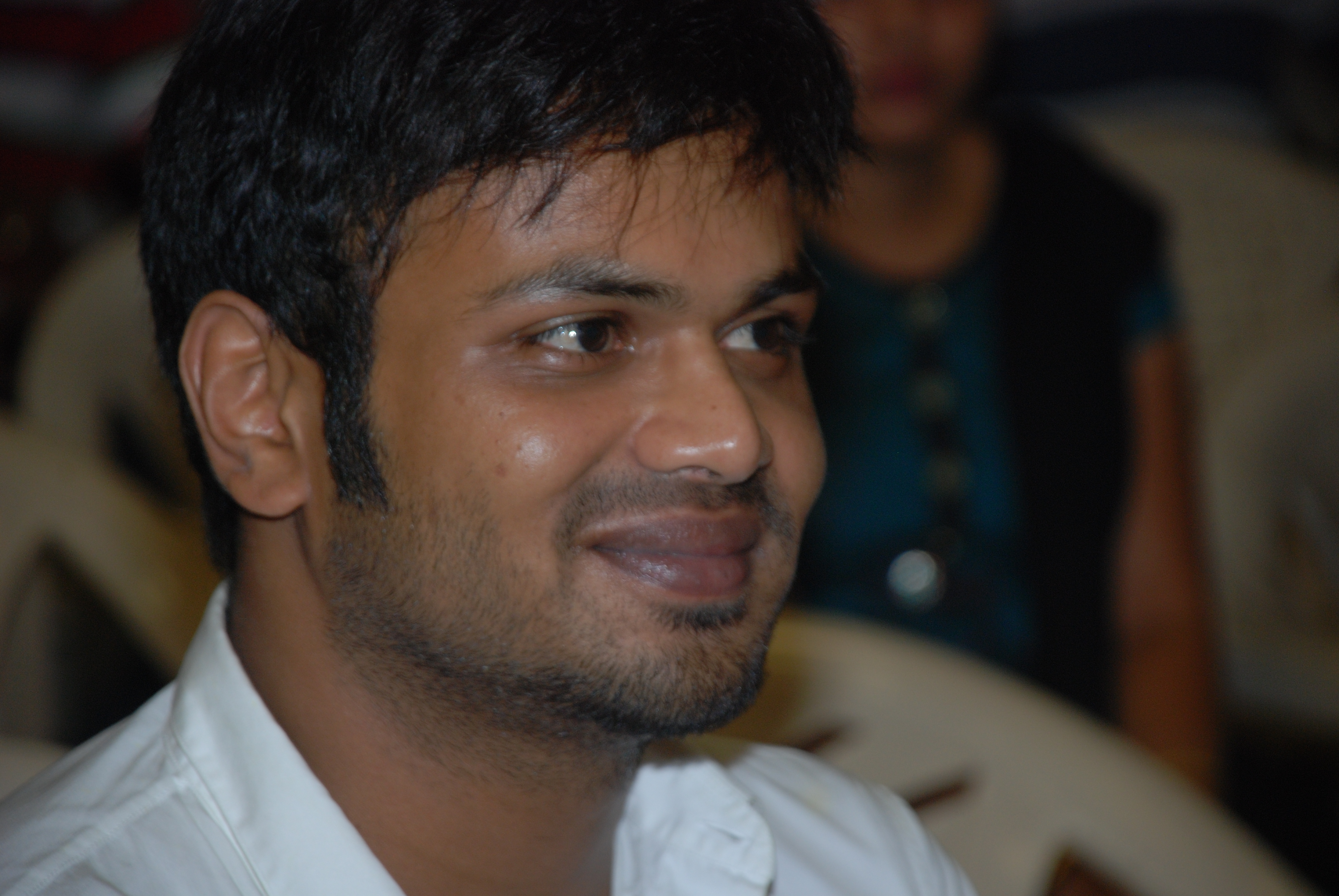
- Manoj in 2013
- Born: Manchu Manoj Kumar; 20 May 1983 (age 43); Madras (present-day Chennai), Tamil Nadu, India
- Occupation: Actor
- Years active: 1993–present
- Spouses: Pranathi Reddy (m. 2015; div. 2019) Bhuma Mounika (m. 2023)
- Children: 1
- Father: Mohan Babu
- Relatives: Lakshmi Manchu (half sister); Vishnu Manchu (half brother)

Manchu Manoj Kumar (born 20 May 1983) is an Indian actor who works in Telugu cinema. He first appeared at the age of ten as a child artist in Major Chandrakanth. He made his film debut in a leading role with Donga Dongadi in 2004. He received the state Nandi Special Jury Award for his performance in box-office success Bindaas (2010). He also starred in Vedam (2010), Potugadu (2013), and Pandavulu Pandavulu Tummeda (2014).

== Early life ==
Manchu Manoj was born on 20 May 1983, to Telugu film actor Mohan Babu and Nirmala Devi. He has two elder paternal half-siblings, Lakshmi Manchu, and Vishnu, who are both actors and producers.

== Career ==
Manoj worked as a child actor in films starring his father Mohan Babu and is shown in flashbacks.

He debuted in the 2004 film Donga Dongadi. In 2005, he appeared in Sri and next in Raju Bhai (2007). His film Nenu Meeku Telusa? was an average grosser, but was known for its melodious music. In 2009, his first film Prayanam, under the direction of Chandra Sekhar Yeleti did moderately well. His first film in 2010, Bindaas, turned out to be the biggest hit of his career. Another film in 2010, Vedam, was a critical and commercial success. He gained accolades for his role in Vedam. In 2012, he starred in Mr. Nookayya and Uu Kodathara? Ulikki Padathara?. In March 2013, he announced 5 films. His subsequent releases were Potugadu, Pandavulu Pandavulu Tummeda and Current Theega. After taking a long break from films, in January 2023, Manchu Manoj announced his first film in 6 years titled What The Fish directed by Vishnu and produced by Six Studios.

== Personal life ==
In May 2015, Manoj married his girlfriend Pranathi Reddy. In 2017, Manoj started a foundation called Manoj Kumar's Unity to collect funds for the development of farmers. He remarried on 3 March 2023 to the youngest daughter of Bhuma Nagi Reddy and Shobha Nagi Reddy, Bhuma Mounika, both former Members of the Legislative Assembly. Mounika has a son from her previous marriage. On 13 April 2024, Manoj and Mounika announced that they were blessed with a baby girl. In December 2024, Manoj had a long dispute with his father and elder brother over the properties owned by their father.

== Legal issues ==
In December 2024, the Delhi High Court passed an interim order restraining Manoj Manchu from publishing or disseminating allegedly defamatory statements against media professional Vinay Maheshwari on social media or other public platforms. The court observed that certain statements made by Manchu, including posts on social media, were prima facie defamatory and could cause lasting harm to Maheshwari's reputation. The court also directed the removal of related articles and content published by various media outlets while the matter remains under consideration.

== Filmography ==
Key
†	Denotes films that have not yet been released

Year	Title	Role	Notes	Ref.
1993	Major Chandrakanth	Major Chandrakanth's grandson	Child actor	
1994	Punya Bhoomi Naa Desam	young Bharath	Child actor	
1997	Adavilo Anna	Manoj	Child actor	
1998	Khaidi Garu	Raju	Child actor	
1998	Raayudu	—N/a	As presenter	
2004	Donga Dongadi	Vasu	CineMAA Awards Best Male Debut	
2005	Political Rowdy	Dancer	Special appearance; also presenter	
2005	Sri	Sri		
2007	Raju Bhai	Raju Bhai		
2008	Nenu Meeku Telusa?	Adithya	Also stunt coordinator	
2009	Prayanam	Dhruv		
2010	Bindaas	Ajay	Nandi Special Jury Award	
2010	Vedam	Vivek Chakravarthy		
2010	Jhummandi Naadam	Balu		
2012	Mr. Nookayya	Nookayya	Also lyricist	
2012	Uu Kodathara? Ulikki Padathara?	Manoj		
2013	Potugadu	Govindu	Also lyricist	
2014	Pandavulu Pandavulu Tummeda	Ajay	Also producer	
2014	Current Theega	Raju		
2014	A day in the life of Lakshmi Manchu's feet	Himself	Short film	
2015	Dongaata	Himself	Special appearance	
2015	Superstar Kidnap	Himself	Special appearance	
2016	Shourya	Shourya		
2016	Attack	Radha Krishna		
2017	Gunturodu	Kanna		
2017	Okkadu Migiladu	Surya and Peter	Dual role	
2018	Idi Naa Love Story	Himself	Cameo appearance	
2018	Operation 2019	Police officer	Cameo appearance	
2025	Bhairavam	Gajapathi Varma		
2025	Mirai	Mahabir Lama / The Black Sword	SIIMA Award for Best Actor in a Negative Role – Telugu	

=== Television ===
Year	Title	Role	Network	Ref.
2023–2024	Ustaad	Host	ETV Win	
