= Bhimaneni Srinivasa Rao =

Film director and producer

- Born: Tathapudi, Guntur district, Andhra Pradesh
- Occupations: Film Director, Producer, Actor

Bhimaneni Srinivasa Rao is an Indian film director, producer, actor and writer from Andhra Pradesh. He is also known as a remake specialist and director of various parody films. He has several hit films to his credit including Subhamastu, Subhakankshalu, Suswagatam and Suryavamsam. He also turned a producer by making Nee Thodu Kavali. He made his acting debut with Kudirithe Cup Coffee.

== Early life and career ==
Bhimaneni Srinivasa Rao was born at Tathapudi village in a farmer's family at Guntur district. He did his schooling at Tathapudi, Murikipudi and Martur villages. Later he did his college education in Chilakaluripet. He started his career working as an assistant director under T.Krishna for Vande Mataram, Devalayam, Repati Pourulu films.

== Filmography ==
=== As director ===
Year	Film	Notes
1995	Subhamastu	Remake of Aniyan Bava Chetan Bava
1997	Subhakankshalu	Remake of Poove Unakkaga
1998	Suswagatam	Remake of Love Today
1998	Suryavamsam	Remake of Suryavamsam
1998	Suprabhatam	Remake of Gopala Gopala
1999	Swapnalokam	Remake of Kabhi Haan Kabhi Naa
2002	Nee Thodu Kavali	Remake of Return to Me
2003	Dongodu	Remake of Meesha Madhavan
2006	Annavaram	Remake of Thirupaachi
2012	Sudigadu	Remake of Tamizh Padam
2016	Speedunnodu	Remake of Sundarapandian
2018	Silly Fellows	Remake of Velainu Vandhutta Vellaikaaran
2019	Kousalya Krishnamurthy	Remake of Kanaa

=== As producer ===
Year	Film
2002	Nee Thodu Kavali

=== As actor ===
Year	Film	Role
1986	Repati Pourulu ( Cameo )	Guy goes to Prostitute & caught by Kota
1987	Prajaswamyam ( Cameo)	
2011	Kudirithe Cup Coffee	Giridhar
2011	Keratam / Yuvan	Siddhu's father / Bala's father
2012	Friends Book	
2019	Kousalya Krishnamurthy	Bank Manager
