= Dongodu =

- Poster
- Directed by: Bhimaneni Srinivasa Rao
- Written by: Ranjan Pramod(story), Marudhuri Raja (Dialogues)
- Based on: Meesa Madhavan by Lal Jose
- Produced by: Bheemaneni Roshitha Sai
- Starring: Ravi Teja; Kalyani
- Cinematography: Ramana Raju
- Edited by: Gowtam Raju
- Music by: Vidyasagar
- Release date: 8 August 2003
- Running time: 140 minutes
- Country: India
- Language: Telugu

Dongodu (transl. Thief) is a 2003 Indian Telugu-language romantic comedy film directed by Bhimaneni Srinivasa Rao. The film features Ravi Teja and Kalyani in the lead roles. The music has been composed Vidyasagar. The movie released on 8 August 2003 was a decent success at the box office. This is a remake of the Malayalam film Meesa Madhavan (2002).

== Plot ==
The movie story deals with Madhava who becomes a thief in his childhood to feed the hunger of his sister and he continues to be a notorious thief in that village. There is one landlord called Naidu (Tanikella Bharani) who exploits the people around by unfair means. Rukhmini is the daughter of Naidu. Naidu also possesses the registration forms of Madhava's house with him because he gave loan to the father of Madhava at a very high interest rate. Madhava pretends to fall in love with Rukhmini so that he could get the registration forms of his house back. The Rest of the film is about how Naidu cooks a plan to convict Madhava in a theft which he has not done and how Madhava emerges as winner.

== Cast ==
- Ravi Teja as Madhava
- Rekha Vedavyas as Prabha
- Kalyani as Rukhmini
- Baby Malasri as young Rukhmini
- Riyaz Khan as S.I. Shiva Raju
- Tanikella Bharani as Naidu
- Brahmanandam as Sastry
- Sunil as Justice Chowdary
- Paruchuri Venkateswara Rao as Venkatachalam
- Chandra Mohan as Chandram, Madhava's father
- Dharmavarapu Subramanyam as Bhadram, Naidu's assistant
- Uttej as Hanumanthu
- Ali as Savitri, Madhava's friend
- M. S. Narayana as Lawyer Narayana
- Shakeela as Shakeela
- Pavithra Lokesh as Devaki Chakravarthy, Bhadram's wife
- Varsha as Madhava's sister
- Uma
- Jeeva
- Rajitha
- Duvvasi Mohan as Duvvasi
- Surekha Vani as Rukhmini's mother

== Soundtrack ==
The soundtrack is composed by Vidyasagar. Lyrics are written by Sirivennela Sitaramasastri, Chandrabose, Bashasree and Bandaru Daanayya. All songs are re-used from the Malayalam original, Meesha Madhavan, except for "Meesala Gopala" which was re-used from "Panchangam Paarkathe" in Thavasi and "Dum Dum Dum" from "Radhai Manadhil" in Snegithiye.

Dongodu

Soundtrack album by Vidyasagar
- Released: 15 July 2003
- Genre: Film soundtrack
- Label: Aditya Music
- Producer: Rushita Sai

Track list
No.	Title	Lyrics	Singer(s)	Length
1.	"Kodi Munda"	Chandrabose	Shankar Mahadevan, Rimy Tomy	4:16
2.	"Dum Dum Dum"	Sirivennela Seetharama Sastry	K. S. Chithra, Valisha Babji	4:49
3.	"Entha Panjesindee"	Sirivennela Seetharama Sastry	Hariharan, Sujatha Mohan	5:27
4.	"Sotta Buggala"	Basha Sri	Karthik, Swarnalatha	4:46
5.	"Donga Donga (Theme)"	Bandaru Danayya	Child Chorus	0:44
6.	"Meesalaa Gopalaa"	Basha Sri	Sri Vardhini, Udit Narayan	4:13
Total length:				24:17

== Release ==
The Hindu gave a mixed review. Idlebrain opined that "One fails to understand why Bheemineni has to buy the remake rights of such an out-of-place storyline and make it in Telugu".
