= Khaidi Garu =

- CD cover
- Directed by: Sai Prakash
- Based on: Kauravar by A. K. Lohithadas
- Produced by: M. Venkatadri Naidu; Adi Reddy
- Starring: Mohan Babu; Laila
- Cinematography: M. V. Raghu
- Music by: Koti
- Production company: Sri Sai Kiran Movies
- Release date: 14 January 1998
- Country: India
- Language: Telugu

Khaidi Garu (transl. Prisoner sir) is a 1998 Indian Telugu-language gangster film directed by Sai Prakash and starring Mohan Babu and Laila with Krishnam Raju and Ranganath in supporting roles. The film is a remake of Kauravar (1992) and was a box office failure unlike the original.

== Cast ==
- Mohan Babu as Raju
- Laila as Rajyam
- Krishnam Raju as Police Commissioner
- Ranganath as Shankardada
- Rami Reddy as Gangaram
- Srihari as Shankardada's son
- Mohan Raj as Shankardada's son
- Giri Babu
- Ali
- Chalapathi Rao as Kannayya
- Master Manoj
- Varsha

== Music ==
The music for the film was composed by Koti.

Khaidi Garu

Soundtrack album by Koti
- Released: 1998
- Genre: Feature film soundtrack
- Length: 26:37
- Language: Telugu
- Label: Aditya Music

Koti chronology
Taraka Ramudu (1998)	Khaidi Garu (1998)	Mee Aayana Jagratha (1998)
External audio
- Khaidi Garu – Jukebox on YouTube

Track listing
No.	Title	Lyrics	Singer(s)	Length
1.	"Allukora Ullasaveera"	Bhuvana Chandra	Mano, K. S. Chithra	4:15
2.	"Cheerammo Changamma"	Suddala Ashok Teja	S. P. Balasubrahmanyam, K. S. Chithra	5:09
3.	"Chirunavvu Chirunama"	Guru Charan	Mano, K. S. Chithra	4:41
4.	"Devatalaara Deevinchandi"		K. J. Yesudas	4:22
5.	"Gajulu Petti"		Mano, K. S. Chithra	4:04
6.	"Vinnapalu Chesukona"		S. P. Balasubrahmanyam, K. S. Chithra	4:06
Total length:				26:37

== Reception ==
A critic from Andhra Today wrote that "Khaidigaru is a movie based on vendetta. Director Sai Prakash, with his deft handling of the good story, changed the 'family story director' tag that stuck to him".
