= Sasimadhanam =

Indian Telugu-language webseries

- Genre: Romantic comedy
- Written by: Winod Gali
- Directed by: Winod Gali
- Starring: Pavan Sidhu; Soniya Singh
- Music by: Sinjith Yerramilli
- Country of origin: India
- Original language: Telugu
- No. of seasons: 1
- No. of episodes: 6

Production
- Executive producer: Rahul Rao
- Producer: Harish Kohirkar
- Cinematography: Rehan Shaik
- Editor: Anil Kumar Pasala
- Production company: Mark My Words Entertainment

Original release
- Network: ETV Win
- Release: 4 July 2024

Sasimadhanam is an Indian Telugu-language romantic comedy television series written and directed by Winod Gali. The series featured Pavan Sidhu and Soniya Singh in lead roles. It was premiered on 4 July 2024 on ETV Win.

== Cast ==
- Pavan Sidhu as Madhan
- Soniya Singh as Sasi
- Kireeti Damaraju as the groom
- Rupa Lakshmi as Rangammatha
- Kruthika as Ramya
- Ashok Chandra as Rama Kotayya
- Keshav Deepak as Chandrabose
- Srilalitha Pamidipati as Saraswathi

== Episodes ==
No.	Title	Directed by	Written by	Original release date
1	"Calling Bell"	Winod Gali	Winod Gali	4 July 2024
2	"The Rangammatha"	Winod Gali	Winod Gali	4 July 2024
3	"Who is the groom?"	Winod Gali	Winod Gali	4 July 2024
4	"OMG–Oh My Ghost"	Winod Gali	Winod Gali	4 July 2024
5	"The Tape Recorder"	Winod Gali	Winod Gali	4 July 2024
6	"The Cat Got Caught"	Winod Gali	Winod Gali	4 July 2024

== Soundtrack ==
All music is composed by Sinjith Yerramilli.

Track list
No.	Title	Lyrics	Singer(s)	Length
1.	"Daarulu"	Swaroop Goli	Saathwik Yadavalli	3:52
2.	"Andala O Chilaka"	Swaroop Goli	Gowtham Bharadwaj, Sindhuja Tanuku	3:00
3.	"Raagam Edhemaina"	Swaroop Goli	Sinjith Yerramilli	3:51
4.	"Manasuke"	Srikanth Allapu	Saathwik Yadavalli	2:52

== Reception ==
Avad Mohammad of OTTPlay rated it 3 out 5 and wrote, "Sasi Madhanam is a romantic comedy that has some well-executed moments". BH Harsh of Cinema Express gave a rating of 2.5 out of 5 and called it "middling yet breezy rom-com".
