= Aarya (film) =

- Theatrical release poster
- Directed by: Balasekaran
- Written by: Balasekaran
- Produced by: Manoj Kumar; Vijay Anandan
- Starring: R. Madhavan; Bhavana; Prakash Raj; Vadivelu
- Cinematography: K. V. Guhan
- Edited by: V. Jaisankar
- Music by: Mani Sharma
- Production companies: Guru Films; VJ Movies
- Distributed by: Rekha Combines
- Release date: 10 August 2007
- Running time: 155 minutes
- Country: India
- Language: Tamil

Aarya is a 2007 Indian Tamil-language romantic comedy film written and directed by Balasekaran and produced by Manoj Kumar and Vijay Anandan. The film stars R. Madhavan and Bhavana, while Prakash Raj and Vadivelu appear in supporting roles. The film's music was composed by Mani Sharma with cinematography by K. V. Guhan and editing by V. Jaisankar. The film was released on 10 August 2007.

== Plot ==
Deepika is an arrogant, rich girl and the sister of local don Kasi. She is a medical college student and dictates terms at the college. In college, she is feared by students, professors, and even the college dean. Aarya is a final-year student who comes to Chennai Medical College from Coimbatore. A soft-spoken Aarya runs into Deepika. They give each other the cold shoulder. In a fit of rage, Deepika kidnaps Aarya's sister, but Aarya faces her challenges daringly. However, she soon falls in love with him, but he is not ready to marry a ruffian's sister. The remaining story tells us how the brother and sister put pressure on Aarya to become a rowdy so his status is equal enough as Kasi's so Aarya can marry Deepika. Meanwhile, "Snake" Babu is elected the area councilor and has a few encounters with Aarya and one with Deepika. Finally, Deepika changes her ways and, with her brother's blessings, unites with Aarya.

== Cast ==
- R. Madhavan as Aarya
- Bhavana as Deepika
- Prakash Raj as Kasi
- Vadivelu as "Snake" Babu
- Devan as HOD
- Kavitha as Aarya's mother
- Tejashree as Dr. Pooja
- Praveen Kumar as Vishwanathan
- Ponnambalam as Meesai Perumal
- Ramji as Thamizharasi
- Thalaivasal Vijay as Collector
- Rajkapoor as Police
- Crane Manohar as Watchman
- Sudha as Vishwanathan's mother
- Vengal Rao as Babu's assistant
- Varshini
- Karnaa Radha
- Alex
- Robert (special appearance in the song "Chile Chile")
- Simran Khan (special appearance)
- Nanditha Jennifer (special appearance in the song "Aarya")

== Production ==
The film was in development as early as 2005. Tejashree was selected ahead of Madhumitha for a role in the film.

== Soundtrack ==
The soundtrack was composed by Mani Sharma and the lyrics were written by P. Vijay.

- "Aarya" - Karthik, Suchithra
- "Ennangira Nee" - Tippu, Anuradha Sriram
- "Aruginil" - Karthik, Varthini
- "Jillendra" - Ranjith, Rita
- "Chile" - Naveen, Saindhavi

== Release ==
Sify wrote, "Director Balasekhar has packaged Aarya keeping the ordinary viewer who loves mass movies in mind. Madhavan, Bhavana and Prakash Raj have done their bit to make it work with the viewers and provide a time-pass entertainer". Manaswini of Kalki wrote if Balasekaran had told the story without tension, increased the pace of the script a little more, reduced the Bhavana-Prakash Raj antics a little more, and polished the climax a little more, Arya would have been someone who cannot be beaten. Malini Mannath of Chennai Online wrote, "It's a film sans any logic or sensibility. But what keeps it going is its racy pace, which breezes through all those bizarre situations and takes it to a finale, where it is all wrapped up in a neat smart knot. You miss this film, you haven't missed much!".

== In other media ==
In 2015, a comedy film titled Vellaiya Irukiravan Poi Solla Maatan, taken from a line mouthed in Vadivelu's comedy sequences, was released.
