= Kauravar =

1992 Indian Malayalam-language action drama film

- Movie poster
- Directed by: Joshiy
- Written by: A. K. Lohithadas
- Starring: Mammootty; Vishnuvardhan; Thilakan; Babu Antony; Bheeman Raghu; Anju
- Cinematography: Jayanan Vincent
- Music by: S. P. Venkatesh
- Release dates: 12 February 1992 (Kerala); 17 February 1992 (Karnataka)
- Running time: 160 minutes
- Country: India
- Language: Malayalam

Kauravar is a 1992 Indian Malayalam-language gangster film directed by Joshiy, written by Lohithadas, starring Mammootty, Vishnuvardhan, Thilakan, Murali, Anju, Babu Antony and Bheeman Raghu. The musical score and songs were composed by S. P. Venkatesh.The film was remade in Telugu in 1998 as Khaidi Garu, starring Mohan Babu and Krishnam Raju. It was also remade in Kannada in 2004 as Devasura, starring Devaraj and B. C. Patil.

== Plot ==
Aliyar, a crime boss, and his gang Hamsa, Ramayyan, and Antony, want to avenge Haridas who was responsible for the death of his lieutenant Antony's wife Suja and daughter as well as Aliyar's wife and two daughters 12 years ago and sent Antony to jail. The story runs to the past when Haridas is appointed as the new commissioner to reduce organized crime. He takes swift action and summons Aliyar, Hamsa, Ramayyan, and Antony to the office. He arrests them and subjects them to third-degree torture. Meanwhile, Kannan Nair Head Constable rapes Suja in front of her daughter. Antony, who had turned over a new leaf while working as a taxi driver, loses control and kills Kannan Nair and other police officers at the police station. In retaliation, Haridas conducts a ruthless raid on the slum of Aliyar. Suja gets shot while protecting Antony, and Aliyar's family is killed in a bomb blast. Antony also loses his daughter. Aliyar, Antony, and Ramayyan are arrested and sentenced to prison. When Antony and the gang are finally freed, they reunite with Aliyar and they plan to kill Haridas. Rajagopal IPS tries to arrest them after their release by sending a Police Officer but they escape and hide with the help of Driver Jaffer. They seek help from George Mathew MLA who grants them after initial refusal. The gang tries to assassinate Haridas and his daughters but Haridas escapes. Finally, Haridas hunts them down and in a fight between Antony and his gang with Haridas, they manage to defeat him. Haridas tries to shoot Antony and his gang, but he gets stabbed by Aliyar. As Haridas is dying, He tells Antony that his daughter, whom he thought had died, is actually still alive and was raised by him as one of his own daughters. Aliyar and his gang do not believe Haridas and do not allow him to see his daughter. Antony pleads with the gang to leave Haridas alone to find his daughter, but he fails to stop them. The gang abandons Antony, and Antony admits Haridas to a hospital, where he sees Haridas's daughters. Antony asks Haridas which one is his daughter, but Haridas refuses to reveal the truth to Antony. He has not shown any partiality to them while raising them. Haridas dies in the hospital, but before dying, he tells Antony to adopt and take care of his daughters as his own. Antony returns to Haridas's house to fulfill Haridas's wish. At first, the three girls despise Antony, but slowly they start to see Antony as their father. When Aliyar and his gang attack Haridas's daughters, Antony fights back with his gang and tries to convince Aliyar not to kill his daughter. Aliyar tells him that he needs to kill only Haridas's daughters, but Antony insists that the three girls are his daughters. Antony gets shot by Aliyar and in defense kills Aliyar, Ramayya, and Hamsa. Aliyar dies in Antony's arms.

As the movie ends when Rajagopal IPS, is about to tell Antony who his actual daughter of Antony, Antony stops Rajagopal saying that all the three girls are his daughters.

== Cast ==
- Mammootty as Antony
- Vishnuvardhan as Superintendent of Police Haridas I.P.S.
- Thilakan as Baba alias Aliyar
- Babu Antony as Hamsa
- Bheeman Raghu as Ramayyan
- Anju as Suja
- Murali as Rajagopal IPS (Commissioner of Police)
- Subair as Sub Inspector Subhash
- Shanthi Krishna as Ramani (Commissioner's wife)
- Devan as George Mathew MLA
- Valsala Menon as Aliyar's wife
- Suvarna Mathew as Aliyar's daughter
- Maniyanpilla Raju as Driver Jaffer
- Kuthiravattom Pappu as Housekeeper Pillai
- Vinu Chakravarthy as Vijayan, Police Sub Inspector
- Kunchan as police
- K. P. A. C. Sunny as Kanaran
- Rudra
- Durga
- Azeez as Circle Inspector Kannan Nair
- Santhosh as Maathu
- Appa Haja in Cameo as Police Officer
- Kollam Thulasi as Advocate
- Kanakalatha

== Release ==
The film was released on 12 February 1992. It was dubbed into Tamil as Kshatriyavamsham and Telugu as Kankanam.

=== Box office ===
The film was both commercial and critical success.

== Soundtrack ==
The film's soundtrack was composed by S. P. Venkatesh. Lyrics were penned by Kaithapram.

No.	Title	Artist(s)	Length
1.	"Kanaka Nilaave"	K. J. Yesudas, K. S. Chitra	4:53
2.	"Muthu Mani Thooval"	K. J. Yesudas	4:43
3.	"Maari Kuliril"	K. J. Yesudas	5:14
4.	"Maari Kuliril"	K. S. Chitra	1:49
