= Thulli Thirintha Kaalam =

- DVD cover
- Directed by: Balasekaran
- Written by: Balasekaran
- Produced by: Rajam Balachander; Pushpa Kandhasamy
- Starring: Arun Vijay; Roshini; Khushbu; Karan
- Cinematography: Vijay Gopal
- Edited by: Ganesh
- Music by: Jayanth
- Production company: Kavithalayaa Productions
- Release date: 12 March 1998
- Running time: 150 minutes
- Country: India
- Language: Tamil

Thulli Thirintha Kaalam (transl. Time of wandering) is a 1998 Indian Tamil-language coming-of-age drama film directed by Balasekaran and produced by Kavithalayaa Productions. The film stars Arun Vijay (credited as Arun Kumar) and Roshini in lead roles while Khushbu, Raghuvaran, and Karan played other supporting roles. It was released on 12 March 1998.

== Plot ==
Four youths are good for nothing and spend their time doing nothing. Their parents too are fed up with their irresponsible behaviour. Kausalya comes to live in their neighbourhood. Seeing their lifestyle and behaviour, she decides to teach them a lesson.

== Cast ==
- Arun Vijay as Ashok
- Roshini as Devi
- Khushbu as Kausalya
- Karan as Raghu
- Raghuvaran as Chidambaram
- Fathima Babu as Visalam
- Ravikumar as Ravi
- Ramji as Manohar
- Dhamu as Dhamu
- Cochin Hanifa as Nair
- Sriman as Saravanan
- Jai Ganesh as Ashok's father
- Vijay Chandrika as Ashok's mother
- Delhi Ganesh as Dhamu's father
- Rami Reddy as Devi's father
- Madhan Bob as Bank Manager
- Mohan Raman as Job Officer Sripal
- Mahendran as Market Worker
- Bayilvan Ranganathan
- Scissor Manohar
- Indhu as Chithra
- Ramesh Khanna as himself
- Babu Ganesh as Karthik, Kausalya's fiance (special appearance)
- Baby Deepika as little girl in song "Kausalya Kalyana"
- Kavithalaya Krishnan as Ravi's brother
- Swathi in a Special appearance
- Alphonsa in a Special appearance

== Soundtrack ==
The soundtrack was composed by Jayanth.

Track listing
No.	Title	Lyrics	Singer(s)	Length
1.	"Deewana"	Vaasan	Mano, Pop Shalini
2.	"Mannil Enna"	Dr. Kruthaya	Mano, Malgudi Subha
3.	"Azhage"	Dr. Kruthaya	K. S. Chithra
4.	"Kowsalya"	Dr. Kruthaya	Harini, Baby Deepika
5.	"Tak Tak Tak"	Dr. Kruthaya	Nandha, Dr. Grubb, P. Unnikrishnan, Sujatha Mohan
6.	"Vaarthai Enna"	Dr. Kruthaya	Mano

== Reception ==
A critic from Dinakaran noted "this film is a milestone that speaks well of the newly set-in trend in Tamil field created by the young generation directors". Ji of Kalki found Kushboo's flashback to be poignant, he found Arun Kumar's performance as poor but praised the other actors while also praising Jayanth's music and felt Kushboo was slowly becoming supporting actress. D. S. Ramanujam of The Hindu wrote, "Karan scales new heights in his career, while director Balasekharan, who has written the story, screenplay and dialogue, queers the pitch [...] Vijaygopal's cinematography captures the drama in good measure".

The film became a commercial success, prompting a Telugu version (Ammayi Kosam) of the film to be produced.
