= Varsha (Telugu actress) =

Indian actress

- Born: Madhavi
- Occupation: Actress
- Spouse: Ajay

Madhavi, known by her screen name Varsha, is an Indian actress who works predominantly in Telugu. She is popular for playing sister roles and in supporting roles to lead actors in many of her movies. She has also acted in a few television serials.

== Early life and career ==
Madhavi was born and brought up in Hyderabad. She made her on screen debut as a child artist in the movie Panjaram in the year 1997. After completing her education she made a come back as a character artist in 1998 with the movie Khaidi Garu. She appeared as one of the lead actresses in movie Nuvve Kavali opposite Tarun and was praised for her performance.

== Filmography ==
- All films are in Telugu, unless otherwise noted.

Year	Film	Role	Notes
1997	Panjaram	Nagu	
1998	Khaidi Garu		
1998	Suswagatham	Fathema	
1998	Gilli Kajjalu		
1998	Suryavamsam		
1998	Kanyadanam		
1998	Suprabhatam		
1998	Aahaa..!	Gayatri	
1999	Thammudu	Shanti	
1999	Seenu	Lavanya	
1999	Neti Gandhi	Priya	
2000	Moodu Mukkalaata	Bhaskara Lakshmi	
2000	Nuvve Kavali	Varsha	
2000	Yuvaraju		
2000	Nuvvu Vastavani	Anitha	
2001	Raavee Na Cheliya	Aruna	
2001	Subhasessulu		
2001	Priyamaina Neeku	Priya	
2001	Simharasi	Lakshmi	
2001	Darling Darling	Saraswathi	
2002	Vasu	Radhika	
2002	Siva Rama Raju	Rajyalakshmi	
2002	Premalo Pavani Kalyan	Meenakshi	
2003	Naaga		
2003	Satyam	Swati	
2003	Dongodu		
2003	Vijayam		
2004	Donga Dongadi		
2004	Mass		
2004	Sakhiya	Hari's sister-in-law	
2004	Kaasi		
2005	Nayakudu		

=== Television ===
- Kurukshetram
- Missama
- Logili
- Toli Prema
- Sundarakanda
- Manasu Mamatha
- Attarintiki Daredi
- Kasthuri
- Mattigajulu
- Malli
- Mandakini
- Dil Se
- Radha Manoharam
- Rangula Ratnam
