= Priyamaina Neeku =

2001 film by Balasekaran

- Poster
- Directed by: Balasekaran
- Written by: Story and screenplay: Balasekaran; Dialogues: Chintapalli Ramana
- Produced by: R. B. Choudary
- Starring: Tarun; Sivaji; Sneha; Preetha
- Cinematography: Shyam K Naidu
- Edited by: V. Jaishankar
- Music by: Shiva Shankar
- Production company: Super Good Films
- Release date: 11 February 2001
- Country: India
- Language: Telugu

Priyamaina Neeku (transl. To You, My Dear) is a 2001 Indian Telugu-language romantic comedy film written and directed by Balasekaran. The film stars Tarun, Sivaji, Sneha (in her Telugu debut) and Preetha, while Ali, Venu Madhav and Tanikella Bharani played supporting roles. The film and the soundtrack received positive reviews upon release, and was a box office success.

The film, owing to its success, was eventually reshot and released in Tamil under the title Kadhal Sugamanathu (transl. Love is Pleasure) in December 2002, with Pyramid Natarajan playing Tarun's father and Livingston playing the comedy tracks portrayed by Ali in the Telugu original. The Tamil version was also successful.

== Plot ==
Ganesh (Tarun) is a carefree college youth from Hyderabad, whose life revolves around friends and doing good deeds for them which upsets his father Raja Shekar (Tanikella Bharani). One day, Ganesh fumbles upon a red diary in Raja Shekar's auction shop. It is actually a diary left behind unknowingly by Sandhya (Sneha), his past neighbor.

The entire first half is narrated through the diary in this film. Sandhya is staying in the house opposite to that of Aishwarya, who is the sister of Ganesh. She falls in love with Ganesh after listening to his melodious guitar play. But Ganesh is unaware of her love and he never uses to interact with her. She is also a shy girl, who never let Ganesh know about her feelings. Sirisha (Preetha Vijayakumar) is the younger sister of Sandhya, who is studying in a hostel. When she comes home for holidays, she envies Sandhya for loving Ganesh and she wanted to grab him from her. Sirisha assures Sandhya that she will liaison the love of Sandhya between Ganesh and her and plays a double game by playing tricks on Ganesh to attract him. Meanwhile, Sandhya and Sirisha's father gets transferred to Visakhapatnam. Sandhya asks Sirisha to tell Sandhya's love to Ganesh. Sirisha proposes to Ganesh and gets rejected. Sandhya, who witnessed the entire episode secretly, feels cheated by the betrayal of her own sister. At the same time, Sandhya stays away from proposing to Ganesh for the fear of rejection. The family of Sandhya moves to Visakhapatnam and in the transfer process, her diary gets misplaced.

After discovering that Sandhya is his secret admirer, Ganesh recognizes the purity in her love and wants to meet her and propose his love to her. He gets off to Visakhapatnam along with his best friend Chacha (Venu Madhav). There, Ganesh develops a genuine friendship with Raghu (Sivaji) and stays in his house. Raghu is a rich bachelor, who lives with his parents. As Ganesh explores his secret mission of finding Sandhya, Raghu gets engaged to the unwilling Sandhya. Later on Raghu learns that Ganesh is there to seek his silent admirer.

Ganesh knows that Raghu is marrying Sandhya. Being a good friend, he does not want to betray him. Sandhya has agreed to marriage since she does not want to make the things worse for her father and sister. But she still loves Ganesh. Sirisha wants to amend the mistake she has done. She searches for Ganesh to unite them. Things are still unsure and hazy as Sandhya and Raghu will marry in a few minutes. In the end, Sirisha tells everything and marries Raghu while Sandhya and Ganesh reunite.

== Cast ==
- Tarun as Ganesh
- Sneha as Sandhya
- Sivaji as Raghu
- Preetha as Sirisha
- Venu Madhav as Chacha
- Tanikella Bharani as Raja Shekar, Ganesh's father
- Ali as Comic Thief
- Chandra Mohan as Shivarama Rao, Sandhya and Sirisha's father
- Jhansi as Aishwarya, Ganesh's elder sister
- Raja Ravindra as Karthik, Ganesh's brother-in-law
- Bandla Ganesh as Ravi, Ganesh's friend
- Rami Reddy as Comic Mental Musician
- Varsha as Priya, Raghu's younger sister
- Siva Parvathi as Ganesh's mother
- Babloo as Ganesh's friend
- Narra Venkateswara Rao as Vishwanathan, Raghu's father

Tamil version

- Pyramid Natarajan as Srinivasan, Ganesh's father
- Livingston as Comic Thief
- Theni Kunjarammal as Grandma on road

== Production ==
Director Balasekaran announced in June 2000 that he would direct a romantic dramedy film, with Tarun Kumar roped to play the main lead. The film was titled Priyamaina Neeku in October 2000. Sneha was confirmed to play the female lead in August 2000 and she joined the sets thereafter. The filming began on 6 November 2000 at Annapurna Studios. Sivaji agreed to play a parallel leading role in this film, as the hero's best friend. Ali, Rami Reddy and Venu Madhav were selected to play the comedians.The rest of the cast includes Tanikella Bharani, Preetha Vijayakumar and Raja Ravindra. The final schedule occurred in January 2001, a month before the film's release. The film's first half was shot in and around Hyderabad and Srikakulam. The second half's story, despite taking place in Vishakhapatnam, was entirely shot in and around Chennai only due to the fact that Visakhapatnam was already crowded due to the shooting of other Tamil films such as Badri and Samuthiram taking place there. Yet some sporadic scenes were covered in Visakhapatnam as well.

== Soundtrack ==
The score and music were composed by Shiva Shankar. The song, "Nelanadiga" was a direct Telugu reuse of the Tamil song "Enna Azhagu" from the 1997 Tamil film Love Today (1997). The songs in Telugu and Tamil versions were same except the song "Nelanadiga", which was replaced in the Tamil version with "Adi Sugama Sugama Chudithaare". "Adi Sugama" was later reused as title song for Hindi film Pyaar Diwana Hota Hai also produced by R. B. Choudary.

Priyamaina Neeku / Kaadhal Sugamanadhu

Soundtrack album by Shiva Shankar
- Released: 1 January 2001 (Telugu Version); 25 December 2002 (Tamil Version)
- Recorded: 2000–2001 (Telugu Version); 2002 (Tamil Version)
- Genre: Feature film soundtrack
- Language: Telugu/Tamil
- Label: Star Music
- Producer: Shiva Shankar

Telugu Version

All lyrics are written by Sirivennela, Bhuvanachandra and Vasanth.

No.	Title	Singer(s)	Length
1.	"Manasuna"	K. S. Chithra
2.	"Nachanura"	Sukhwinder Singh, Swarnalatha
3.	"Veyi Jenmalu"	S. P. Balasubrahmanyam
4.	"Mastu Mastu"	Harini, Shankar Mahadevan
5.	"Nelanadiga"	S. P. Balasubrahmanyam
6.	"Manasuna"	S. P. Balasubrahmanyam

Tamil Version

All lyrics are written by Viveka.

No.	Title	Singer(s)	Length
1.	"Sollathan Ninaikiren"	K. S. Chitra
2.	"Vechirukka"	Mano, Swarnalatha
3.	"Ezhu Jenmangal"	S. P. Balasubrahmanyam
4.	"Mutham Mutham Kodu"	Tippu, Sujatha
5.	"Adi Sugama Sugama Chudithaare"	Karthik
6.	"Sollathan Ninaikiren (Sad)"	S. P. Balasubrahmanyam

== Reception ==
Jeevi of Idlebrain.com opined that "Because of the nature of story, this film went on a slow pace. He [Balasekaran] could have made the film little shorter. Nonetheless, he made sure that this film too have all the clean ingredients the youth is looking for". A critic from Sify wrote that "Unlike other Supergood films, the musical score of Sivasankar is pedestrian except for one song and director could have added one or sub plots to make it more engrossing. Sneha fails to live to up the role and it is Tarun all the way". A critic from Full Hyderabad wrote that "Except for the idea the diary from which the movie unfolds, there is nothing novel about the film". Andhra Today wrote "This movie may not add great value to the Super Good Films banner, but certainly won't ruin their reputation. Variety in the story is sure to add to the movie's strength. Some scenes look 'stretched' and slow down the pace of the movie, but the deft handling by the director make one gloss over the minor defects".
