= Wife Off =

2025 Indian Telugu-language film by Bhanu Yerubandi

- Release poster
- Directed by: Bhanu Yerubandi
- Written by: Bhanu Yerubandi
- Produced by: Divya Sree Gurugubelli; Abhinav Manikanta; Nikhil Gajula
- Starring: Divya Sree Gurugubelli; Abhinav Manikanta; Nikhil Gajula
- Cinematography: Ashkar Ali
- Edited by: Sai Krishna Ganala
- Music by: Praneeth Muzic
- Production company: Tamada Media
- Distributed by: ETV Win
- Release date: 23 January 2025
- Running time: 80 minutes
- Country: India
- Language: Telugu

Wife Off is a 2025 Indian Telugu-language crime thriller film written and directed by Bhanu Yerubandi. The film features Divya Sree Gurugubelli, Abhinav Manikanta and Nikhil Gajula in lead roles.

The film was released on 23 January 2025 on ETV Win.

== Plot ==
Avani, a budding actress and Abhi, a short film director fall in love. Unfortunately, Avani marries her Uncles son, Ram. In a serious events, Avani gets involved in prostitution and a series of murders.

== Cast ==
- Divya Sree Gurugubelli as Avani
- Abhinav Manikanta as Abhi
- Nikhil Gajula as Ram
- Sai Swetha
- Veera Manohar Kaavali
- Kiran Putakala

== Release and reception ==
Wife Off was originally scheduled to have a theatrical release, but had a direct-to-video release on 23 January 2025 on ETV Win.

Bhavana Sharma of Deccan Chronicle was critical of screenplay and wrote in her review, "Wife Off had the potential to deliver a gripping thriller but ultimately falls short due to lackluster storytelling, clichéd themes, and poor technical execution". Avad Mohammad of OTTPlay rated the film 2 out of 5 and wrote, "Wife Off is a film that has decent twists. But to enjoy them one has to sit through some silly scenes and predictable drama".
