= Ustaad (TV show) =

Indian variety talk-show

- Genre: Variety; Talk show
- Created by: Manchu Manoj
- Directed by: Surendra Redrowthu
- Country of origin: India
- Original language: Telugu
- No. of seasons: 1
- No. of episodes: 9

Production
- Producer: TG Vishwa Prasad
- Production locations: Ramoji Film City, Hyderabad
- Camera setup: Multi-camera
- Production company: People Media Factory

Original release
- Network: ETV Win
- Release: 15 December 2023 – 8 February 2024

Ustaad is an Indian Telugu-language variety talk show hosted by Manchu Manoj. It was premiered on 15 December 2023 on ETV Win.

== Episodes ==
#	Guest(s)	Premiere
1	Nani	15 December 2023
2	Siddhu Jonnalagadda	21 December 2023
3	Rana Daggubati	28 December 2023
4	Vishwak Sen	4 January 2024
5	Teja Sajja, Prasanth Varma	11 January 2024
6	Adivi Sesh	18 January 2024
7	Aadhi Pinisetty, Sundeep Kishan	25 January 2024
8	Ravi Teja	1 February 2024
9	Sharwanand	8 February 2024
