= Billa II (soundtrack) =

Soundtrack album by Yuvan Shankar Raja
- Released: 2 May 2012
- Recorded: 2011–2012
- Studios: Prasad Studios, Chennai; S. A. S. I. Studios, Chennai; Studio NYSA, Mumbai
- Genre: Feature film soundtrack
- Length: 22:42
- Language: Tamil
- Label: Sony Music
- Producer: Yuvan Shankar Raja

Yuvan Shankar Raja chronology
Mr. Nookayya (2012)	Billa II (2012)	Dhenikaina Ready (2012)

Billa II is the soundtrack album, composed by Yuvan Shankar Raja, for the 2012 film of the same name, directed by Chakri Toleti that stars Ajith Kumar as the title character. The album consists of six tracks; five songs and a theme music track. Na. Muthukumar penned all lyrics for the songs. It was released through Sony Music India on 2 May 2012 and topped the charts upon release.

== Production ==
Yuvan Shankar Raja, who previously composed for Billa (2007) has been retained for Billa II in his fifth project with Ajith. The soundtrack album was reported to feature six tracks, including one promotional video song. It consists of five songs and a theme music track, an altered version of the original 2007 Billa theme. Yuvan Shankar Raja had composed a sixth song for a belly dance sequence, which was not included in the soundtrack, but featured only in the film. Na. Muthukumar agreed to write the lyrics, replacing Pa. Vijay who had worked on Billa's lyrics. In a departure from convention, the lyrics were penned first which were set to tunes later.

Yuvan Shankar Raja revealed in 2014 told that he tried to recruit Shakira for the project but failed because of "budget troubles". In late January 2012, Yuvan Shankar Raja left for Florida, US, Chakri's home place, to finish the compositions. During the trip, he had composed a "melody song". Singer Krish informed via Twitter that he had lent his voice for a R&B style song that would be the introduction track of the protagonist, while Shweta Pandit was reported to have performed one song, too. However, Krish's version was later replaced by Yuvan himself. Re-recording works began by May 2012 in Mumbai.

== Release ==
The audio launch was initially to be released in mid-March 2012, but was then pushed to second week of April. Rajinikanth and A. R. Rahman was approached to unveil the soundtrack, with the team supposedly rescheduling the audio launch to suit Rajinikanth's dates, who had left for London for the filming of his film Kochadaiyaan. Later, the team had planned for a soft launch at Rajinikanth's residence in Poes Garden.

The soundtrack was unveiled on 1 May 2012, coinciding with Ajith Kumar's birthday. The album was directly released to stores without a launch event owing to Ajith's stance on not attending promotional events. It was distributed by Sony Music India which acquired the film's music rights for an unprecedented sum after week-long negotiations. In the week before the audio launch, Sony Music began releasing teasers of each of the songs every day and promoted them across social platforms. The Telugu version of the soundtrack was released on 5 June 2012 at the Taj Deccan in Hyderabad.

== Reception ==
Pavithra Srinivasan of Rediff.com gave it 3 stars out of 5 and went to add that Yuvan Shankar Raja had "infused certain freshness to the music", describing it as "quite promising". Karthik Srinivasan of Milliblog added that "Yuvan salvages Billa 2's heavily stylized music" with two songs "Madurai Ponnu" and "Idhayam". Vipin Nair of Music Aloud called it a "largely disappointing soundtrack from Yuvan Shankar Raja for the much-hyped Billa 2" giving 6 out of 10 to the album.

Anupama Subramanian of Deccan Chronicle wrote "In the earlier Billa, Yuvan’s music was a talking point. Here, leave alone the lacklustre songs, even the background score is a major let-down." Meena Iyer of The Times of India and Pratihibha Parameswaran of IBN Live considered the music to be "very weak" and "there're hardly any interesting song sequences in the film". The New Indian Express listed "Yedho Mayakkam" as one of Yuvan's best songs adding "A fusion number from one of Yuvan’s best albums, this party number starts with a nadaswaram portion and then goes on to incorporate trance music elements. This one throws up many surprises!"

== Track listing ==
All lyrics are written by Na. Muthukumar.

Track listing
No.	Title	Singer(s)	Length
1.	"Gangster"	Yuvan Shankar Raja, Stefny	4:07
2.	"Idhayam"	Shweta Pandit	4:04
3.	"Yedho Mayakkam"	Yuvan Shankar Raja, Tanvi Shah, SuVi	4:22
4.	"Madurai Ponnu"	Andrea Jeremiah	3:55
5.	"Unakkulle Mirugam"	Ranjith	4:18
6.	"Billa II Theme Music"	Yuvan Shankar Raja	1:56
Total length:			22:42

Second release
No.	Title	Singers	Length
7.	"Everytime I See You (Georgian)"	Sofia Bedia	3:53

== Awards and nominations ==
Award (Note: Awards, festivals and organisations are in alphabetical order.)	Date of ceremony (Note: Date is linked to the article about the awards held that year, wherever possible.)	Category	Recipient(s) and nominee(s)	Result	Ref.
Mirchi Music Awards South	26 August 2013	Female Vocalist of the Year	Shweta Pandit for "Idhayam"	Nominated	
Mirchi Music Awards South	26 August 2013	Technical – Sound Mixing of the Year	Kausikan Sivalingam and Ozrur Ikinci for "Gangster"	Won	
Vijay Awards	11 May 2013	Best Female Playback Singer	Shweta Pandit for "Idhayam"	Nominated	

== Personnel ==
=== Instruments ===
- Live Drums & Percussion: V. Kumar
- Flute: Napoleon
- Veena: Devi
- Sitar: Ganesh
- Nadaswaram: Thirumoorthy
- Electric Guitar: Kabuli & Joshwa
- Tabla: L. V. Prasad, Prasad, Madhu, V.Ramana, Neelu, Venkat Balu, Venkatrao, Shruti
- Tavil: Sundar
- Female Harmony: Surmuki, Priya, Priyadharshini, Anitha

=== Production ===
- Program Manager: V. Karthik
- Program Co-ordination: A. S. Subbiah
- Recorded at: Prasad Studios & S.a.s.i Studios, Chennai
- Recorded by: M.Kumaraguruparan, Baranidharan & Prabhakar
- Theme Music mixed by M.Kumaraguruparan
- Theme Music mastered at Studio N.Y.S.A. Mumbai
- Theme Music mastered by Murali
- Mixed at nHow Studios, Berlin, Germany
- Mixed by Kausikan Sivalingam & Özgür İkinci
- Mastered at Masterlab Berlin
