= Subhakankshalu =

1997 Indian film by Bhimaneni Srinivasa Rao

- DVD cover
- Directed by: Bhimaneni Srinivasa Rao
- Written by: Story: Vikraman; Screenplay: Bhimaneni Srinivasa Rao; Dialogues: Marudhuri Raja
- Based on: Poove Unakkaga (Tamil)
- Produced by: N. V. Prasad; Sanam Naga Ashok Kumar; R. B. Choudary (Presenter)
- Starring: Jagapathi Babu; Ravali; Raasi
- Cinematography: Mahinder
- Edited by: Gowtham Raju
- Music by: Koti; S. A. Rajkumar
- Production company: Sri Sai Deva Productions
- Release date: 14 February 1997
- Running time: 154 minutes
- Country: India
- Language: Telugu

Subhakankshalu (transl. Congratulations) is a 1997 Indian Telugu-language comedy-drama film directed by Bhimaneni Srinivasa Rao. Produced by N. V. Prasad and S. Naga Ashok Kumar, the film stars Jagapathi Babu, Ravali, and Raasi, who made her debut in a lead role in Telugu cinema. The music for the film was jointly composed by Koti and S. A. Rajkumar.

The film is a remake of the 1996 Tamil film Poove Unakkaga.

== Plot ==
The film begins in a village marked by intense rivalry between two neighbouring families: one Hindu and the other Christian. Seetaramayya and Stephen, the respective patriarchs, are at odds, a conflict that extends to their wives and sons, Balaramayya and Moses. The two families were once very close and shared a cordial relationship 25 years ago. Seetaramayya’s daughter, Janaki, and Stephen’s younger son, Robert, fell in love despite their families' opposition. The couple elopes, gets married, and the feud between the families starts.

In the present day, Chandu, the son of Janaki and Robert, arrives with his friend Gopi but is rejected by both families due to the longstanding enmity. With nowhere else to go, they find shelter with Nadabrahmam, a noisy and eccentric singer. Chandu’s goal is to reconcile with his family, and gradually endears himself to them. His grandmothers arrange two potential marriages for him, which he tries to avoid. On Gopi’s advice, Chandu fabricates a story, claiming to have already married a woman named Nirmala Mary, who is a Hindu-Christian like him. To his surprise, a woman claiming to be Nirmala Mary appears, mocking him and revealing that she is actually Priyadarsini, the real daughter of Janaki and Robert.

In the flashback, Chandu and Gopi, orphans and unemployed, live as tenants in a penthouse nearby a ladies' hostel where Nandini, the daughter of Balaramayya, resides. Nandini and the other girls are preparing for a music competition but struggle with composing a tune. Chandu helps them indirectly, and they win the competition. He and Nandini become good friends, and Chandu develops feelings for her. While Chandu was on the verge of expressing his love to Nandini, she introduces Lawrence, Moses’s son, as her fiancé, leaving Chandu heartbroken. When Lawrence and Nandini ask Chandu to bless their marriage without their families’ knowledge, Chandu agrees, and he decides to unite the families for the sake of their love.

Nirmala/Priyadarsini secretly harbours feelings for Chandu and supports his efforts. After some comedic situations, Chandu successfully brings the old people in the families together. Meanwhile, Balaramayya and Moses discover their children’s relationship and react angrily. During a confrontation, Chandu steps in to defend them, even though he is injured. Lawrence and Nandini, defying their religious backgrounds, express their desire to marry, and Seetaramayya and Stephen come to understand the importance of love over religion. In the end, the families come together, and Chandu’s true identity is revealed with the arrival of Robert and Janaki.

Finally, Chandu is offered the chance to marry Nirmala/Priyadarsini, but he declines, stating that he has already loved someone else and will cherish those memories for the rest of his life. The film concludes with Chandu walking away, accompanied by the statement: "A person who is facilitating his lover's marriage to her partner."

== Cast ==
- Jagapati Babu as Chandu
- Ravali as Priyadarsini (Nirmala Mary)
- Raasi as Nandini
- Satyanarayana as Seetaramayya
- Nagesh as Stephen
- Devan as Balaramayya
- Anandaraj as Moses
- Brahmanandam as Writer Tukaram
- Sudhakar as Gopi
- Sowkar Janaki as Seetaramayya's wife
- Sukumari as Rosy, Stephen's wife
- AVS as Nadabrahmam
- Mallikarjuna Rao as Buchi
- Maharshi Raghava as Robert
- Rakesh as Lawrence
- Sudha as Gayatri
- Rajitha as Janaki
- Y. Vijaya as Nadabrahmam's wife
- Krishna (special appearance)
- Alphonsa (special appearance)
- Ranjitha (special appearance)

== Soundtrack ==
Subhakankshalu

Soundtrack album by: Koti; S. A. Rajkumar
- Released: 1996
- Genre: Feature film soundtrack
- Length: 32:40
- Language: Telugu
- Label: Shivani Audio Company
- Producer: Koti S. A. Rajkumar

Koti chronology
Hitler (1997)	Subhakankshalu (1996)	Chilakkottudu (1997)

S. A. Rajkumar chronology
Pelli (1997)	Subhakankshalu (1997)	Suswagatham (1998)

The music for the film was composed by Koti and S. A. Rajkumar. The audio soundtrack was released by Shivani Audio Company. Three songs from the original Tamil film Poove Unakkaga were retained in the Telugu version, titled "Anandamananda," "O Pori Pani Puri," and "Panchavennela", which was based on "Anantham Anantham", "Oh Pyari" and "Machinichi", respectively.

In the movie credits, only Koti is credited as the composer. Additionally, in many audio soundtrack releases and film DVDs, only Koti is listed, while in a few, only S. A. Rajkumar is credited. There are also versions that credit both composers.

No.	Title	Lyrics	Music	Singer(s)	Length
1.	"Gundeninda Gudigantalu"	Sirivennela Sitarama Sastry	Koti	S. P. Balasubrahmanyam, Renuka	4:30
2.	"Manasa Palakave"	Sirivennela Sitarama Sastry	Koti	S. P. Balasubrahmanyam, K. S. Chithra	5:10
3.	"Addanki Chera"	Samavedam Shanmukha Sarma	Koti	S. P. Balasubrahmanyam, K. S. Chithra	4:46
4.	"Anandamananda (F)"	Samavedam Shanmukha Sarma	S. A. Rajkumar	K. S. Chithra	5:08
5.	"Panchavannela Chilaka"	Sirivennela Sitarama Sastry	S. A. Rajkumar	Mano, Sujatha	3:43
6.	"O Pori Panipuri"	Bhuvana Chandra	S. A. Rajkumar	S. A. Rajkumar	4:11
7.	"Anandamananda (M)"	Samavedam Shanmukha Sarma	S. A. Rajkumar	S. P. Balasubrahmanyam	5:03
Total length:					32:40

== Reception ==
A critic from Andhra Today wrote, "The director richly deserves `Subhkankshalu' (congratulations) for giving a good treatment to a neat story. The conclusion is different (away from the run-of-the mill)".
