= Dil Se (TV series) =

Indian Telugu-language webseries

- Genre: Romantic comedy
- Written by: Bharath Naren
- Directed by: Bharath Naren
- Starring: Raja Vikram; Ramana Bhargava; Bhargav
- Music by: Ajay Arasada
- Country of origin: India
- Original language: Telugu
- No. of seasons: 1
- No. of episodes: 12

Production
- Producer: Sridhar Marisa
- Cinematography: Anush Kumar
- Editors: Rajmeda; Tramp Kiran
- Production company: Sri Akkiyan Arts

Original release
- Network: ETV Win
- Release: 16 September – 17 October 2023

Dil Se is an Indian Telugu-language romantic comedy television written and directed by Bharath Naren. The series featured Raja Vikram, Ramana Bhargava and Bhargav in important roles. It was premiered on 16 September 2023 on ETV Win.

== Cast ==
- Raja Vikram as Harsha Nandamuri
- Ramana Bhargava as Srinivas Avasarala
- Bhargav as Vivek Devarakonda
- Rahul Varma as Karthik Konidela
- Rohini Rachel as Vasudha Varanasi
- Varsha as Laxmi N

== Episodes ==
#	Premiere
1	16 September 2023
2	16 September 2023
3	19 September 2023
4	22 September 2023
5	26 September 2023
6	29 September 2023
7	29 September 2023
8	3 October 2023
9	6 October 2023
10	10 October 2023
11	13 October 2023
12	17 October 2023

== Reception ==
Avad Mohammad of OTTPlay gave a mixed review.
