= Leela Vinodham =

2024 Indian Telugu-language film by Pavan Sunkara

- Release poster
- Directed by: Pavan Sunkara
- Written by: Pavan Sunkara
- Produced by: Sridhar Marisa
- Starring: Shanmukh Jaswanth; Anagha Ajith
- Cinematography: Anush Kumar
- Edited by: Naresh Adupa
- Music by: T R Krishna Chetan
- Production company: Sri Akkiyan Arts
- Distributed by: ETV Win
- Release date: 19 December 2024
- Running time: 98 minutes
- Country: India
- Language: Telugu

Leela Vinodham (also spelt as Leela Vinodam) is a 2024 Indian Telugu-language romantic comedy film written and directed by Pavan Sunkara. The film features Shanmukh Jaswanth and Anagha Ajith in lead roles.

The film was released on 19 December 2024 on ETV Win.

== Cast ==
- Shanmukh Jaswanth as PMRK Prasad
- Anagha Ajith as Leela
- Goparaju Ramana as Leela's father
- Aamani as Prasad's mother
- Rupa Lakshmi
- Shravanthi Anand
- Mirchi RJ Saran as Rajesh
- Prasad Behara
- Shiva Thummal
- Madhan Mohan
- Chaitanya Garikina

== Music ==
All lyrics are written by Suresh Banisetti; all music is composed by T R Krishna Chethan.

Track list
No.	Title	Singer(s)	Length
1.	"Madhurame"	Adithya RK	4:13

== Release ==
Leela Vinodham was originally scheduled to release on 3 October 2024, but was later released on 19 December 2024 on ETV Win.

== Reception ==
BH Harsh of Cinema Express gave a rating of 3.5 out of 5 and stated, "Leela Vinodham is a heartwarming letter to the younger days, and the older times". Times Now Telugu had a similar opinion, but praised the performance of Shanmukh Jaswanth.
