= Love Today (1997 film) =

- Poster
- Directed by: Balasekaran
- Written by: Balasekaran
- Produced by: R. B. Choudary
- Starring: Vijay; Suvalakshmi; Manthra
- Cinematography: Vijay Gopal
- Edited by: V. Jaishanker
- Music by: Shiva
- Production company: Super Good Films
- Release date: 9 May 1997
- Running time: 150 minutes
- Country: India
- Language: Tamil
- Budget: ₹30 lakh
- Box office: ₹3.80 crore

Love Today is a 1997 Indian Tamil-language romantic drama film written and directed by Balasekaran (in his directorial debut). Produced by R. B. Choudary, the film stars Vijay and Suvalakshmi in the lead roles while Manthra, Raghuvaran, Karan and Sriman play supporting roles. The music was composed by Shiva with cinematography by Vijay Gopal and editing by V. Jaishanker. The film received positive reviews from critics and became a commercial success, running for over 175 days at the Tamil Nadu box office. It was remade in Telugu as Suswagatham, in Kannada as Majnu and in Hindi as Kya Yehi Pyaar Hai.

== Plot ==
Ganesh is a college graduate who lives with his father Chandrasekhar, a doctor. Chandrasekhar is easygoing and pampers Ganesh with whatever he wants. Sandhya is the daughter of Vasudevan, a very strict police inspector, who is always suspicious that she would have a love affair. Sandhya decides that she will never fall in love, and her ambition is to get a gold medal in her college degree. One day, Ganesh spots Sandhya and falls in love with her at first sight. Even though Sandhya catches a good glimpse of him, she tells her friend Fathima that she likes no one. Ganesh goes to the bus stop every day to see Sandhya. He seeks advice from his friends Ravi and Peter to convince Sandhya to marry him. Their advice goes in vain as she does not care about him. She confronts Ganesh one day and tells him not to waste his time on her.

Ganesh gets hold of Sandhya's friend Preethi, and she tries to talk to Sandhya, but she is unmovable. Vasudevan becomes suspicious of Ganesh and Sandhya and uses physical force on Ganesh. He also verbally abuses Sandhya, though she tries to explain her innocence. Sandhya is forced to leave town because of this. Ganesh finds her whereabouts and leaves his father to go out of town and find her. As he is trying to find her, Chandrasekhar has an accident and passes away. Ganesh's friends desperately try to find him but cannot trace him. Peter ends up performing Chandrasekhar's last rites. Ganesh returns and gets heartbroken that he could not even perform his father's cremation.

At this point, Sandhya reveals her feelings for Ganesh, telling him that she loves him and wants to spend the rest of her life with him. However, Ganesh rejects her feelings and tells her that he lost everything because of falling in love and could not even do his father's last rites; therefore, it is not worth it. Nevertheless, the following day, Sandhya is seen standing at the bus stop, waiting for Ganesh to come. Meanwhile, Ganesh takes the recommendation his father wrote for him before his death and goes for his first interview.

== Cast ==
- Vijay as Ganesh
- Suvalakshmi as Sandhya
- Manthra as Preethi
- Raghuvaran as Dr. Chandrasekar, Ganesh’s father
- Rajan P. Dev as Inspector Vasudevan
- Bindu Panicker as Krishnaveni
- Karan as Peter
- Sriman as Ravi, Ganesh's friend
- Dhamu as Siva, Ganesh's friend
- Mohan Raman as ACP
- K. S. Jayalakshmi as Preethi's mother
- Ramji as Peter's friend

== Production ==
The filming began in November 1996, after Vijay finished the shootings for his previous masala films such as Selva (1996) and Kaalamellam Kaathiruppen (1997), and lasted until April 1997. Although the story takes place in Chennai, the movie was predominantly shot only in Vishakhapatnam yet some minor portions were shot in Chennai too. Ajith Kumar was initially considered to play the lead role. In an interview during the release, Vijay mentioned that he signed the film to give the audience what they want — fights, fast songs and a message — mentioning he had similar success from Poove Unakkaga (1996).

== Soundtrack ==
The soundtrack is composed by newcomer Shiva, whose real name is Rakneesh Omar and who earlier composed an album. The song "Enna Azhagu" was reused by Shiva in the 2001 Telugu film Priyamaina Neeku as "Nelanadiga Puvvulanadiga", also produced by R. B. Choudary and directed by Balasekaran.The audio rights were acquired by Star Music India.

Track listing
No.	Title	Lyrics	Artist(s)	Length
1.	"Yen Pennendru" (duet)	Vairamuthu	Mohammed Aslam	05:22
2.	"Yen Pennendru" (solo)	Vairamuthu	P. Unni Krishnan	04:05
3.	"Enna Azhagu Ethanai Azhagu"	Vairamuthu	S. P. Balasubrahmanyam	04:57
4.	"Kuppayi Kuppayi"	Vaigarai Selvan	Yugendran	02:37
5.	"Aalai Ethikinu"	Vaasan	Mano, Kalpana	04:53
6.	"Salamiya"	Vaasan	Mano, Malgudi Subha	05:12
7.	"Monica Monica"	'Pattukottai' Shanmuga Sundaram	Suresh Peters, Febi Mani	04:41
Total length:				30:27

== Reception ==
Ananda Vikatan rated the film 42 out of 100. The film became one of several successful films in the romantic genre which Vijay featured in throughout the late 1990s. The success of the film prompted the director and actor to come together again immediately for a film titled Priyamudan; however, the title was later used by Vijay for a different project which released in 1998.

== Remakes ==
The film was remade in Telugu as Suswagatham (1998), in Kannada as Majnu (2002), and in Hindi as Kya Yehi Pyaar Hai (2002).
