= Raju Bhai =

2010 Indian Telugu film

- Directed by: Surya Kiran
- Written by: M. Ratnam (Dialogues)
- Screenplay by: Surya Kiran
- Story by: Mysskin
- Based on: Chithiram Pesuthadi (2010) by Mysskin
- Produced by: Mohan Babu; M. Nirmala Devi (Presenter)
- Starring: Manoj Manchu; Sheela Kaur; Kadhal Dhandapani
- Cinematography: Prasad Murella
- Edited by: Gautham Raju
- Music by: Yuvan Shankar Raja
- Production company: Sree Lakshmi Prasanna Pictures
- Release date: 18 May 2007
- Country: India
- Language: Telugu

Raju Bhai is a 2007 Indian Telugu-language drama film directed by Surya Kiran, starring Manoj Manchu and Sheela Kaur, with Kadhal Dhandapani, Tanikella Bharani and Brahmanandam in supporting roles. The film, a remake of the successful 2006 Tamil film Chithiram Pesuthadi, directed by Mysskin was produced by Manoj's father, Mohan Babu, released on 18 May 2007 and was critically and commercially unsuccessful.

== Plot ==
Raju, a thug, falls in love with a girl and gives up his corrupt practices. However, he gets framed for a major scam that brings out his dark past, sabotaging his relationship.

== Cast ==
- Manoj Manchu as Raju
- Sheela Kaur as Anjali
- Saranya Ponvannan as Raju's mother
- Kadhal Dhandapani as Babaji
- Tanikella Bharani as Anjali's father
- Dharmavarapu Subramanyam as Realtor Yerriswamy
- Jayavani as Yerriswamy's wife
- Rajiv Kanakala as Gajja
- Chatrapathi Sekhar as Sekhar
- Sunil as Singer
- Mallikarjuna Rao as Malli
- Brahmanandam as Corporator
- Suman Setty as Corporator's accountant
- Raghu Babu as Romeo
- Ali as Sub-inspector
- MS Narayana as thief
- Kallu Chidambaram as customer
- Santhosh Pavan as Hari, Anjali's fiancé
- Surya Kiran Cameo appearance
- Jeeva as Raju's father (Archive Photo)

== Soundtrack ==
Raju Bhai

Soundtrack album by Yuvan Shankar Raja
- Released: 28 April 2007 (India)
- Recorded: 2007
- Genre: Feature film soundtrack
- Producer: Yuvan Shankar Raja

Yuvan Shankar Raja chronology
Aadavari Matalaku Ardhalu Verule (2007)	Raju Bhai (2007)	Satham Podathey (2007)

The music was scored by noted Tamil musician Yuvan Shankar Raja. The soundtrack, which released on 28 April 2007, features 9 tracks with lyrics provided by Suddala Ashok Teja and Ramajogaiah Sastry. One of the songs, "Korameenu", was retained from the original Tamil film Chithiram Pesuthadi, composed by Sundar C. Babu, whilst two other songs were earlier used in a Tamil film.

The album became a "big hit" as the songs gained immense popularity upon release. Also reviews were very favorable, praising composer Yuvan Shankar Raja and describing his compositions as "superb", "a major strength to the movie" and "excellent".

Track	Song	Singer(s)	Duration	Lyricist	Notes
1	"Chalthaa Chalthaa"	Ranjith	4:47	Ramajogaiah Sastry	
2	"Evvare Nuvvu"	Harish Raghavendra	4:09	Ramajogaiah Sastry	Reused song "Devathaiyai Kanden" from Kaadhal Kondein
3	"Kantipapakasirinda"	Ranjith	1:35	Ramajogaiah Sastry	
4	"Korameenu"	Jassie Gift	4:42	Suddala Ashok Teja	Reused song "Vazhameenukkum" from Chithiram Pesuthadi, composed by Sundar C. Babu
5	"Neekosam Pilla"	Premji Amaran, Suchitra	4:14	Ramajogaiah Sastry	Fusion of old Tamil song Unakkaga Ellam Unakkaga with new composition
6	"Gucchi Gucchi"	Harish Raghavendra	5:16	Ramajogaiah Sastry	Reused song "Thottu Thottu" from Kaadhal Kondein
7	"Sommunu"	Ranjith	0:28	Ramajogaiah Sastry	
8	"Lothe Teliyanide"	Ranjith	0:28	Ramajogaiah Sastry	
9	"Evvare Nuvvu (Remix)"	Yuvan Shankar Raja, Rajesh, Premji Amaren	4:47	Ramajogaiah Sastry	
