= ETV Win =

Indian video streaming service

- ETV Win's logo used since 2019
- Website type: OTT streaming platform
- Available in: English; Telugu
- Headquarters: Ramoji Film City, Hyderabad, India
- Country of origin: India
- Area served: India
- Owner: ETV Network
- Founder: Ramoji Rao
- Industry: Entertainment; Mass media
- Products: Streaming media; video on demand; digital distribution
- Services: Film production; film distribution; television production; television distribution
- Website: etvwin.com
- Commercial: Yes
- Registration: Required
- Launched: 6 November 2019; 6 years ago
- Current status: Active

ETV Win is an Indian subscription video on-demand and over-the-top streaming service owned by ETV Network, a subsidiary of the Ramoji Group. The service primarily distributes original and acquired films and television shows in Telugu language.

It was launched in November 2019.

== Original programming ==
Original programming is produced and distributed under the label "ETV Win Originals". Righto Lefto was the first original television show, whereas, Match Fixing was the first original film to be distributed.

=== TV shows ===
Title	Premiere	Genre	Seasons	Status
Righto Lefto	22 March 2023	Sitcom	1 season, 10 episodes	Ended
U & I	27 April 2023	Romantic drama	1 season, 5 episodes	Ended
Dil Se	16 September 2023	Romantic comedy	1 season, 12 episodes	Pending
Mr Nagabhushanam	13 October 2023	Romantic comedy	1 season, 5 episodes	Ended
Ustaad	15 December 2023	Variety talk show	1 season, 9 episodes	Renewed
90's – A Middle Class Biopic	5 January 2024	Family drama	1 season, 6 episodes	Renewed
Thulasivanam	21 March 2024	Comedy drama	1 season, 6 episodes	Ended
Sasimadhanam	4 July 2024	Romantic comedy	1 season, 6 episodes	Ended
Katha Sudha	6 April 2025	Anthology drama	1 season, 77 episodes	Ongoing
AIR: All India Rankers	3 July 2025	Coming-of-age comedy	1 season, 7 episodes	Pending
Constable Kanakam	14 August 2025	Mystery thriller	2 season, 10 episodes	Renewed
Gurthukosthunnayi	3 July 2026	Comedy drama	1 season, 7 episodes	Pending
Second Marriage	30 July 2026	Romantic comedy	1 season, 6 episodes	Ended
Tholubommalu	17 September 2026	Comedy drama	1 season, 6 episodes	Ended
Least Eligible Bachelor	9 October 2026	Comedy drama	1 season, 6 episodes	Pending
Awaiting release
Jilledu Chettu	TBA			
Little Things	TBA			

=== Films ===
Title	ETV Win release date	Genre	Runtime
Match Fixing	5 May 2023	Romantic comedy	119 minutes
Asalu	13 April 2023	Crime thriller	102 minutes
Kanulu Therichinaa Kanulu Moosinaa	16 June 2023	Romantic drama	120 minutes
Police Story	28 July 2023	Crime thriller	104 minutes
Krishna Rama	22 October 2023	Drama	119 minutes
Valari	6 March 2024	Horror thriller	123 minutes
Rush	13 June 2024	Action thriller	93 minutes
Veeranjaneyulu Viharayatra	14 August 2024	Road comedy drama	121 minutes
Leela Vinodham	19 December 2024	Romantic comedy	98 minutes
Break Out	9 January 2025	Thriller	84 minutes
Pothugadda	30 January 2025	Political drama	111 minutes
Anaganaga	15 May 2025	Family drama	136 minutes
Little Hearts (Note: Co-distributed with Bunny Vas Works and Vamshi Nandipati Entertainments for theatrical release)	1 October 2025 (Note: Theatrical release on 5 September 2025)	Romantic comedy	128 minutes
Yenugu Thondam Ghatikachalam	13 November 2025	Comedy	113 minutes
Raju Weds Rambai	18 December 2025 (Note: Theatrical release on 21 November 2025)	Romantic drama	135 minutes
Papam Prathap (Note: Co-distributed with People Media Factory and Mythri Movie Distributors LLP for theatrical release)	7 May 2026 (Note: Theatrical release on 17 April 2026)	Comedy drama	150 minutes
S Saraswathi (Note: Co-distributed with Dosa Diaries LLP)	4 June 2026 (Note: Theatrical release on 6 March 2026)	Thriller	120 minutes
Newton's 3rd Law (Note: Co-distributed with Mark My Words Entertainment)	28 August 2026 (Note: Theatrical release on 31 July 2026)	Crime thriller	135 minutes
Awaiting release
Paakashala Pantham	2026	Comedy	TBA
SI Yugandhar	2026	Thriller	TBA

== Exclusive distribution programming ==
These products, even though listed as ETV Win Originals, are programs that were acquired for exclusive distribution to stream them.

=== TV shows ===
Title	Premiere	Genre	Seasons	Status
Sammelanam	20 February 2025	Romantic drama	1 season, 6 episodes	Ended

=== Films ===
Title	Release date	Genre	Runtime
Wife Off	22 January 2025	Crime thriller	80 minutes
