= Samavedam Shanmukha Sarma =

Indian spiritual teacher, scholar, journalist, and lyricist (born 1967)

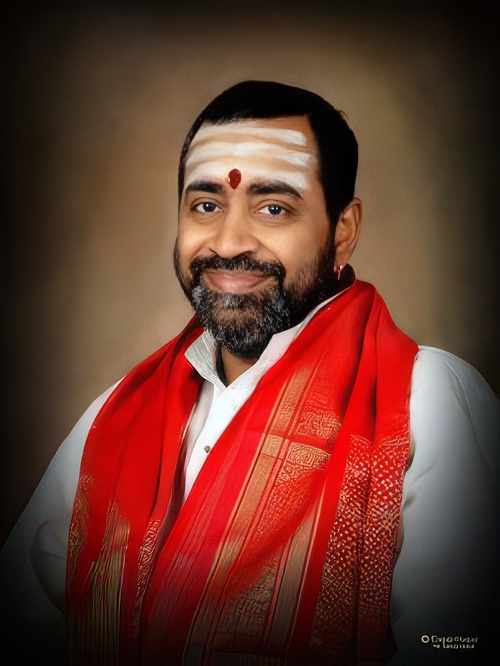

Personal life
- Born: Samavedam Shanmukha Sarma; 16 May 1967 (age 59) Asika, Orissa
- Honors: Samanvaya Saraswati, Vagdevi Varaputra, Dharmika Varenyam

Religious life
- Religion: Hinduism
- Philosophy: Advaita Vedanta

Samavedam Shanmukha Sarma (born 16 May 1967) is an Indian spiritual orator, scholar, journalist, and lyricist, known for his discourses on Hindu scriptures. He delivers lectures on a wide range of texts, including the Vedas, Puranas, Itihasas, and Sastras, presenting complex spiritual concepts in an accessible manner for a wider audience.

Shanmukha Sarma is also the editor of Rushipeetam, a monthly magazine that focuses on promoting Indian spiritual and cultural heritage. He has been instrumental in starting spiritual educational initiatives, including the creation of an online institution offering courses on Hindu scriptures. As a Poet he has authored two Satakams (A century of Telugu Poems) along with Sivapadam a collection of over 1000 devotional songs in praise of lord Siva, which blend philosophy and devotion along with his poetic prowess.

== Early life and family ==
Samavedam Shanmukha Sarma was born on 16 May 1967 in Asika, Orissa, to the scholarly family of Samavedam Ramamurthy Sarma, a distinguished Sanskrit Pandit and Ramanamma. His father is his first Guru and under his tutelage, he grew deep interest in Shastras, Puranas, Upanishads. The quest to serve society and spread Indian Vision (Bharateeyata) was seeded early in his mind. He earned a Bachelor of Arts (Honours) in Economics degree from Berhampur University..

His meeting with Sadguru Sivanand Murthy proved to be a pivotal turning point. With his blessings, Samavedam Shanmukha Sarma set his spiritual mission and began working relentlessly to share Vedic knowledge through discourses throughout India and abroad.

== Journalism and Literature ==
After completing his education, Shanmukha Sarma moved to Vijayawada and began his career as a sub-editor for Swathi, a Telugu weekly magazine.

Around 2001, he founded the bilingual (Telugu-English) monthly magazine Rushipeetham, dedicated to the exposition of Indian scriptures, culture, philosophy and heritage. He is the editor of this magazine which has been enlightening lakhs of spiritual seekers & readers every month till date. The magazine is available in both print and digital editions. The Rushipeetham office is headquartered in Madhuranagar, Neredmet, Hyderabad.

== Career as Lyricist ==
Shanmukha Sarma's career as a lyric writer began with a devotional album produced by playback singer S. P. Balasubrahmanyam. The album's success led Shanmukha Sarma to the film industry. He rose to prominence as a lyricist with the success of Pelli Sandadi (1996), which established him as a sought-after lyricist. His other notable films include Subhakankshalu (1997) and Suryavamsam (1998). In 2004, The Hindu described Sarma as being "on par with the likes of Sirivennela Seetharama Sastry and Veturi Sundararama Murthy," despite starting his career later than his contemporaries. After a distinguished stint in cinema, he shifted his focus entirely to spiritual discourses - a transition he has described as a calling rather than a choice.

== Spiritual discourses ==
Shanmukha Sarma began delivering spiritual discourses in the early 2000s, with his first lecture on "Agni" at Sivaramakrishna Kshetram in Vijayawada. His lectures have since then covered a wide range of topics from Hindu scriptures.

Known for his ability to simplify complex spiritual and philosophical concepts, Sarma is recognized for his scholarly depth and interpretative skills. He has been referred to as "Samanvaya Saraswathi" for his insightful explanations of these texts. His discourses have attracted large and diverse audiences across India and beyond. He has delivered lectures across countries such as the United States, the United Kingdom, and Australia etc.

=== Encyclopedic Lectures ===
Samavedam Shanmukha Sarma has delivered numerous discourses that covered length and breadth of the Indian spirituality and Dharmic traditions to a great extent. The following are a few highlights :

- Brahma Sutras
- Bhagavad Gita
- Dasopanishad Saram
- Lalitha Sahasranamam
- Vishnu Sahasranamam
- Siva Sahasranamam
- Siva Rahasyam
- Tiruvembavai
- Narayaneeyam
- Yoga Vasishta
- Sampurna Ramayanam
- Sampurna Mahabharatam
- Rudra Namaka Bhashyam
- Sivananda Lahari
- Soundarya Lahari
- Srimad Bhagavatam
- Siva Puranam
- Devi Mahatmyam
- Hindu Dharmam and many more ...

=== Philosophical Outlook ===
His philosophical orientation is rooted in Advaita Vedanta, the non-dual school of Adi Shankaracharya, which he integrates with a devotional Shaiva emphasis. He draws extensively from texts such as the Siva Gita in the Padma Purana, interpreting them as affirming Shiva's supreme status within a non-sectarian Vedantic framework. He rejects allegorical dilutions that prioritize psychological metaphor over Agamic and Puranic textual authority.

Samavedam Shanmukha Sarma is called Samanvaya Saraswathi for his unparalleled ability to bridge topics from different Shastras and Puranas to the present context. In his discourses, he expounds the meaning of each subject across four dimensions: Bhava Ardha (emotional meaning), Loukika Ardha (worldly meaning), Vedantha Ardha (Vedantic meaning), and Tatvika Ardha (philosophical essence). His discourses are noted for being so lively that listeners become deeply inquisitive to know more.

Samavedam Shanmukha Sarma cites Swami Vivekananda as a primary source of inspiration and consistently emphasises Bharateeya Sanatana Dharma. He has expressed public concern over the commercialisation of education, healthcare, and food as contrary to scriptural teaching, and advocates for greater awareness of Indian cultural and spiritual values, particularly among the youth.

== A Renowned Telugu Poet ==
Samavedam Shanmukha Sarma is widely recognised as a distinguished Telugu poet whose literary output spans devotional keerthanalu, sataka Rachana, and classical verse rooted in Sanatana Dharma. His poetic sensibility draws inspiration from the great Telugu literary and devotional traditions, particularly the works of Annamayya, Thyagaraja, Srinatha Kavi Sarvabhouma, Pothana and Viswanatha Satyanarayana — the towering figures who shaped the traditional and contemporary literary landscapes of Telugu culture. Among his most celebrated works are:

- Sivapadam — A collection of more than 1,000 devotional keerthanas on Lord Shiva, composed in Telugu and Sanskrit, blending Shaiva philosophy with devotional poetry drawn from the Vedas, Puranas, and Rudranamakam.
- Neelakanteswara Satakam — A century of devotional verses (satakam) in classical Telugu, in praise of Lord Neelakanteswara (Shiva), composed in the traditional satakam poetic form which employs a recurring makuṭam (phrase) at the close of each verse.
- Ramachandra Prabhu - Another century of devotional verses dedicated to Lord Sri Rama. These verses cover Sri Rama's story along with his might and philosophical view points in Sri Rama's character and way of life

== Rushipeetham Charitable Trust and Institutions ==
The Rushipeetham Charitable Trust was founded by Samavedam Shanmukha Sarma as the institutional vehicle for his spiritual and cultural mission. The name Rushipeetham (lit. "Land of Seers") symbolises Bharata Bhumi, the spiritual land of the ancient sages.

=== Bharatha Rushipeetham (magazine) ===
A bilingual (Telugu–English) monthly magazine founded in 2000 under the title Rushipeetham, later renamed as Bharatha Rushipeetham. It provides simplified expositions of the Vedas, Puranas, Itihasas, and Shastras, and is available as both a print edition and a digital e-magazine, subscribed by readers across India and in the Telugu diaspora worldwide.

=== Rushividhyabhyasam - Online spiritual courses ===
Under the guidance and supervision of Samavedam Shanmukha Sarma, multiple courses related to spiritual and Indic sciences are conducted online through Rushividyabhyasam (rushividyabhyasam.org), an initiative of the Rushipeetham Charitable Trust established in 2021. These structured courses — covering texts such as the Bhagavad Gita, Upanishads, and Puranas — are designed for all age groups and spiritual levels, progressing from Shravanam (listening) through Mananam (reflection) to Nidhi Dhyasa (deep internalisation)

=== Dhruva Jnanam - For Younger Generation ===
Dhruva Jnanam (dhruvajnanam.org) is an initiative of the Rushipeetham Charitable Trust offering structured, character-based spiritual education for children and young learners. The programme, conducted under the blessings of Samavedam Shanmukha Sarma, combines the acquisition of Vedic knowledge with values of discipline, devotion, and ethical living — encapsulated in its tagline "Success with Character."

=== Other Trust Activities ===
The Trust also promotes Kalaposhana (support for traditional Indian arts), Go Seva & Go Samrakshana (cow protection), Arsha Dharma Parirakshana (protection of righteous living), and an annual Rushipeetha Puraskaram award honouring outstanding contributors to Dharma and Vedic culture.

== Konthamuru Sri Vallabha Ganapati Temple, Rajamahendravaram ==
Samavedam Shanmukha Sarma established Sri Vallabha Ganapati Temple situated in Konthamuru, Rajahmundry, Andhra Pradesh — a sacred spiritual complex on the banks of the river Godavari. He personally installed Sri Vallabha Ganapati along with fifteen other forms of Ganapati within the temple premises, making it a unique centre of Ganesha devotion in the region.

Within the Konthamuru complex is a dedicated shrine to Sri Panchamukha Anjaneya Swamy — the five-faced form of Lord Hanuman, one of the most powerful and revered manifestations in Hindu devotional tradition.

== Publications ==
Samavedam Shanmukha Sarma is a prolific author whose works span Vedantic commentary, scriptual exegesis, devotional poetry, stotram editions, and spiritual essays. His publications are distributed by Rushipeetham Publications and are available through Telugu bookstores across India and online. Major works include:

Title	Description
Sri Vishnu Vidya	Comprehensive Telugu Commentary on Vishnu Sahasranamas.
Sri Lalitha Vidya	Definitive Telugu exposition of the Lalitha Sahasranamam, combining Upasanam (devotion), Upanishad knowledge, and the secrets of Srividya worship.
Siva Rahasyam	Telugu commentary on the Siva Rahasyam — an Itihasa-level text; explores the supreme secrets of Shaiva philosophy across its many dimensions.
Yesha Dharma Sanathanaha	A collection of articles explaining significance of the nature, principles, and contemporary relevance of Sanatana Dharma.
Idi Yathartha Mahabharatham	A transcript of the discourse on Mahabharata which clears many misconceptions and establishes the essence of Maharshi Vyasa's thought & message.
Samaadhaanam	A collection of answers to innumerous questions from Jignyasus (Enthusiasts) about the Dharma and Indian Spirituality
And Many More..

== Titles and Honours ==
Shanmukha Sarma has received several honorary titles for his contributions to Hindu philosophy and culture. Notable awards include:

- Samanvaya Saraswathi
- Aarsha Dharmopanyasa Kesari
- Vaagdevi Varaputhra.
- Bharathi Thyagaraja Samman (2014)
- Asthana Vidwan of Sri Kanchi Kamakoti Peetham — the title of Court Scholar conferred by the Sri Kanchi Kamakoti Peetham, one of the most prestigious honours in the Advaita Vedanta tradition, recognising his scholarship and contribution to Sanatana Dharma
- Vidya Vachaspathi (D.Litt) - Doctor of literature degree conferred by Rashriya Sanskrit Vidyapeetha, Tirupati
- Dharmika Varenya title (2021)
