= Balasekaran =

Indian film director

- Born: Dhanabalan; 9 January; Coimbatore, Tamil Nadu, India
- Occupations: Film director, writer
- Years active: 1997–2013

Balasekaran is an Indian film director and writer of Tamil and Telugu-language films. He is known for his work Love Today, starring Vijay. He was once an assistant to K. Balachander.

He also worked in Tamil serials as writer in Nandini and Lakshmi Stores.

== Career ==
After Love Today, Balasekaran started work on a film titled Sollamalae for producer R. B. Choudary but later opted out. The producer released a film with the same name and a different script, later in 1998. Following the relative success of his Thulli Thirindha Kaalam (1997), Kavithalayaa signed him on for a further film titled Uyirezhuthu, though the project eventually did not materialise. He subsequently began making Solli Vidu for Vivekananda Pictures in mid-1998, with newcomers Raghuram, the son of producer Thiruppur Mani, and Simran. Simran was later replaced by Jyothika, who herself was later replaced by Poonam. Supporting actors such as Radhika, Raghuvaran and Prakash Raj were also signed up, but the film was later shelved.

In 2003, the director was signed on by producer Prakash Raj to direct a film titled Thillalangadi starring Prabhu Deva and Sneha. However the film failed to proceed and the venture was shelved.

== Filmography ==
Year	Film	Language	Notes
1997	Love Today	Tamil	
1998	Thulli Thirindha Kaalam	Tamil	
2001	Priyamaina Neeku	Telugu	partially reshot in Tamil as Kadhal Sugamanathu (2003)
2001	Snehamante Idera	Telugu	
2003	Taarak	Telugu	
2004	Ammayi Bagundi	Telugu	
2007	Arya	Tamil	
2012	Vinayaga	Tamil	partial reshot version of Vinayakudu (2008)
2013	Oruvar Meethu Iruvar Sainthu	Tamil	
