= Jagapathi Babu filmography =

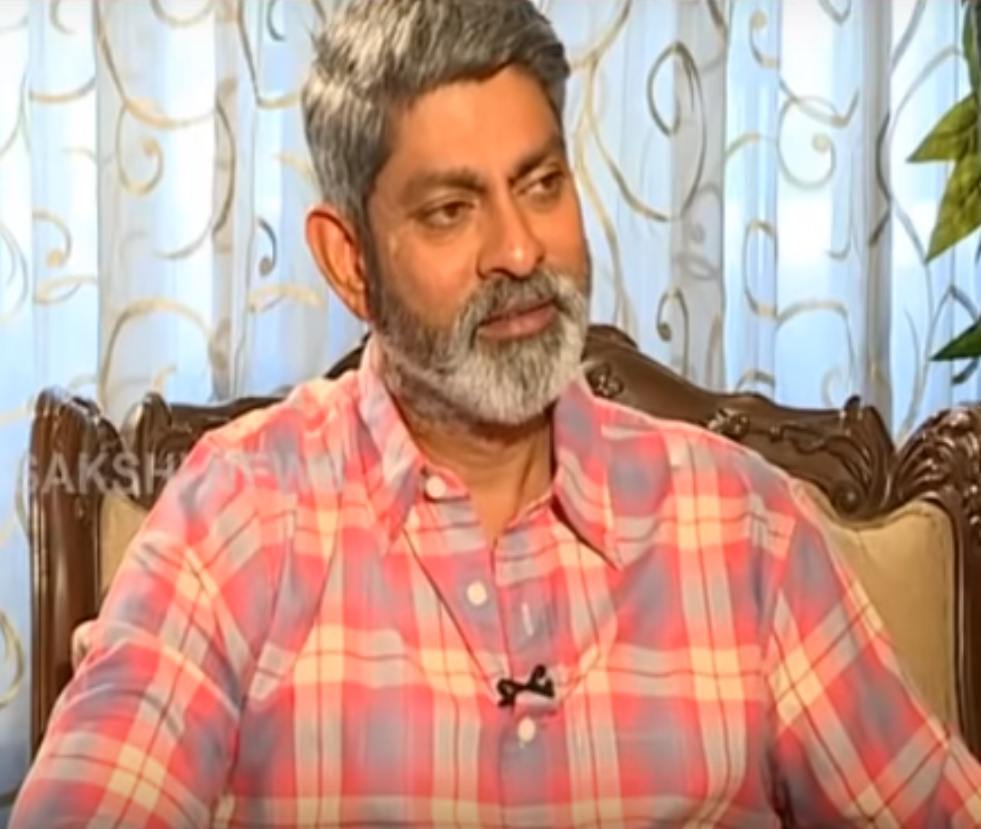
Babu during an interview.

Jagapathi Babu is an Indian actor known for his work primarily in Telugu cinema, along with notable appearances in Tamil, Kannada, Malayalam, and Hindi films. He made his acting debut with the Telugu film Simha Swapnam (1989), produced by his father V. B. Rajendra Prasad and directed by V. Madhusudhana Rao. Jagapathi Babu gained commercial success with Peddarikam (1992) and achieved critical acclaim with Gaayam (1993), directed by Ram Gopal Varma. He established himself as a leading actor with Subhalagnam (1994) and won the Nandi Award for Best Actor in 1996 for his performance in Maavichiguru.

Jagapathi Babu made his Tamil debut with Madrasi (2006) and later portrayed an antagonist in Thaandavam (2012). His lead role in the Telugu film Jai Bolo Telangana (2011) earned recognition, with the film winning five Nandi Awards. In 2012, he debuted in Kannada cinema with Bachchan, and in 2016, he made his Malayalam debut in Pulimurugan.

In August 2015, Jagapathi Babu announced Samudram, an autobiographical television series marking his debut in television.

== Acting roles ==
Key
†	Denotes films that have not yet been released

=== Telugu ===
List of Jagapathi Babu Telugu film credits
Year	Title	Role	Notes
1989	Simha Swapnam	Rajesh & Harish (Note: Jagapathi Babu performances in a double role films.)	Debut; Dual role
1989	Adavilo Abhimanyudu	Captain Abhimanyu	
1990	Chinnari Muddula Papa	Anand	
1991	Pandirimancham	Rowdygaru	
1991	Parishkaram	ACP Chandrashekhar	
1991	Jagannatakam	Jagam	
1992	Sahasam	Inspector Chandu	
1992	Asadhyulu	Sridhar	
1992	Peddarikam	Krishna Mohan	
1992	Raguluthunna Bharatham	Inspector Pratap	
1992	Mother India	Sivaji	
1992	Balaramakrishnulu	Sivaji	
1993	Aasayam	Suribabu	
1993	Pillalu Diddina Kapuram	Raghu	
1993	Aadarsam	Sivaji	
1993	Gaayam	Durga	
1994	Bhale Pellam	Nanda Gopal	
1994	Allari Premikudu	Krishna Murthy	
1994	Jailor Gari Abbai	Raja	
1994	Subhalagnam	Madhu	
1994	Money Money	Durga	Cameo
1994	Theerpu	Ravi	
1995	Chilakapachcha Kaapuram	Gopala Krishna	
1995	Bhale Bullodu	Krishna	
1995	Sankalpam	Krishna Murthy	
1995	Aayanaki Iddaru	Surya	
1995	Subhamastu	Prem Chand	
1996	Srikaram	Chandu	
1996	Maa Aavida Collector	Raju	
1996	Maavi Chiguru	Madhu	
1996	Jabilamma Pelli	Ramudu	
1997	Subhakankshalu	Chandu	
1997	Chilakkottudu	Jagapathi Babu	
1997	Pelli Pandiri	Govind	
1997	Priyaragalu	Madhu	
1997	Oka Chinna Maata	Chandu	
1997	Dongata	Raju	
1998	Maavidaakulu	Pratap	
1998	Pelli Kanuka	Sagar	
1998	Pelli Peetalu	Gopi	
1998	Antahpuram	Sarai Veeraraju	
1998	Srimathi Vellostha	Ravi	
1998	Aahaa..!	Sriram	
1999	Swapnalokam	Kaasi	
1999	Manasulo Maata	Shankar	
1999	Alludugaaru Vachcharu	Murali	
1999	Ravoyi Chandamama	Sujit	
1999	Samudram	Sagar	
2000	Manoharam	Anand	
2000	Sardukupodaam Randi	Krishna	
2000	Choosoddaam Randi	Aravind	
2000	Moodu Mukkalata	Shanthi Swaroop	
2000	Bachi	Bhaskar Chinmay "Bachi"	
2001	Budget Padmanabham	Budget Padmanabham	
2001	Family Circus	Subramanyam	
2001	Naalo Unna Prema	Sai Krishna	
2001	Hanuman Junction	Dasu	
2002	Siva Rama Raju	Sivaramaraju	
2002	Sandade Sandadi	Chandu / Chandra Shekar	
2003	Kabadi Kabadi	Rambabu	
2003	Dham	Rushi	
2004	Athade Oka Sainyam	Sridhar / Chanti	
2004	Kushi Kushiga	Surya Prakash / S.P.	
2004	Pedababu	Pedababu	
2005	Anukokunda Oka Roju	Inspector Suresh Reddy	
2005	Pandem	Seenu	
2005	Jagapati	Jagapathi	
2005	That Is Pandu	Paandu	
2006	Samanyudu	Chandra	
2006	Brahmastram	Guru	
2006	Gopi – Goda Meedha Pilli	Balavindar Cheda	
2006	Pellaina Kothalo	Hari	
2007	Lakshyam	ACP Subash Chandra Bose	
2008	Swagatam	K.K. / Krishna	
2008	Nagaram	ACP Chowdary	
2008	Bhale Dongalu	DCP Yugandhar	
2008	Kathanayakudu	Bala Krishna / Barber Balu	
2008	Homam	Malli	
2008	Raksha	Rajeev	
2009	Siddham	Dayanand	
2009	Aakasamantha	Sudhakar	Partially reshot version
2009	Adhineta	Suribabu	
2009	Bangaru Babu	Chinnababu Ravindra	
2009	Ninnu Kalisaka	Himself	Cameo
2009	Pravarakhyudu	Sasi Kumar	
2010	Maa Nanna Chiranjeevi	Chiranjeevulu	
2010	Sadhyam	Sandeep	
2010	Gaayam 2	Ram / Durga	
2011	Jai Bolo Telangana	Gopanna	
2011	Chattam	Gowri Shankar	
2011	Nagaram Nidrapotunna Vela	Siva Rama Prasad	
2011	Key	Invigilator	
2011	Kshetram	Veera Narasimha Rayalu	
2012	Nandeeswarudu	Eeswar Prasad	
2012	Six	Vijay	
2013	Operation Duryodhana 2	Ashok	
2014	Legend	Jeetendra	
2014	April Fool	Prakash	Cameo
2014	Ra Ra... Krishnayya	Jaggu Bhai	
2014	Current Theega	Sivaramaraju	
2014	Pilla Nuvvu Leni Jeevitam	Maisamma	
2014	O Manishi Katha	Ramu	
2015	Srimanthudu	Ravikanth	
2015	Hitudu	Sitaram	
2016	Nannaku Prematho	Krishna Murthy Kautilya	
2016	Attack	Kaali	
2016	Ism	Javed Bhai	
2017	Om Namo Venkatesaya	King	
2017	Winner	Mahendra Reddy	
2017	Rarandoi Veduka Chudham	Krishna	
2017	Patel S. I. R.	Subhash Patel & Vallabh Patel (Note: Jagapathi Babu performances in a double role films.)	Dual role
2017	Jaya Janaki Nayaka	Aswith Narayana Varma	
2017	Oxygen	Raghupathi	
2017	Hello!	Prakash	
2018	Rangasthalam	President Phanindra Bhupathi	
2018	Nela Ticket	Aditya Bhupati	
2018	Saakshyam	Munu Swamy	
2018	Goodachari	Raghuveer / Raana	
2018	Aatagallu	Public Prosecutor Veerendra	
2018	Aravinda Sametha Veera Raghava	Basi Reddy	
2019	Yatra	Y. S. Raja Reddy	
2019	Maharshi	Vivek Mithal	
2019	Oh! Baby	God	
2019	Sye Raa Narasimha Reddy	Veera Reddy	
2020	Miss India	Kailash Siva Kumar / KSK	
2021	FCUK: Father Chitti Umaa Kaarthik	Phani Bhupal	
2021	Pitta Kathalu	Viswa Mohan	
2021	Tuck Jagadish	Bosu Babu	
2021	Republic	Dasaradh	
2021	Maha Samudram	Chunchu Mama	
2021	Akhanda	Aghora Baba	
2021	Lakshya	Parthasaradhi	
2022	Hero	Sripati	
2022	Good Luck Sakhi	Coach	
2022	Radhe Shyam	Anand Rajput	
2022	Ghani	Eswarnath	
2023	Ramabanam	Rajaram	
2023	Rudrangi	Bheem Rao Deshmukh	
2023	Salaar: Part 1 – Ceasefire	Raja Mannar	
2024	Guntur Kaaram	Dokka Marx Babu	
2024	The Family Star	Jagadish Chandra Prasad	
2024	Simbaa	T. Purushottam Reddy	
2024	Mr. Bachchan	Mutyam Jaggayya	
2024	Pushpa 2: The Rule	Kogatam Veera Pratap Reddy	
2025	Ghaati	Vishwadeep Rao	
2025	Mirai	Angama Bali	
2026	Godari Gattupaina	Sambabu	
2026	Peddi	Appalasoori	
2026	Nagabandham: The Secret Treasure	Prabhakar	
2026	Newton's 3rd Law	Stephen Mercury	

=== Other languages ===
List of Jagapathi Babu film credits in other languages
Year	Title	Role	Language	Notes
2006	Madrasi	Shiva	Tamil	
2012	Thaandavam	Sharath Kumar	Tamil	
2013	Puthagam	JB	Tamil	
2013	Bachchan	Vijay Kumar	Kannada	
2014	Lingaa	M.P. Nagabhushanam	Tamil	
2016	Jaguar	CBI Officer	Kannada	
2016	Pulimurugan	Daddy Girija	Malayalam	
2016	Kaththi Sandai	DCP Thamizhselvan	Tamil	
2017	Bairavaa	Periya Kannu (PK)	Tamil	
2018	Aadhi	Narayana Reddy	Malayalam	
2019	Viswasam	Gautam Veer	Tamil	
2019	Madhura Raja	V. R. Nadesan	Malayalam	
2021	Roberrt	Nana Bhai	Kannada	
2021	Annabelle Sethupathi	Kadhiresan	Tamil	
2021	Laabam	Vanagamudi	Tamil	
2021	Annaatthe	Udhav Paraker	Tamil	
2021	Madhagaja	Bhairava Dorai	Kannada	
2022	Radhe Shyam	Anand Rajput	Hindi	
2022	Monster	Lucky Singh	Malayalam	Cameo appearance
2023	Kisi Ka Bhai Kisi Ki Jaan	Kodati Nageshwar	Hindi	
2023	Voice of Sathyanathan	Nambiar	Malayalam	
2023	Kaatera	Devaraya	Kannada	
2024	Ruslaan	Officer Sameer Singh	Hindi	
2025	Jaat	Sathya Moorthy	Hindi	
2025	Elumale	Vinay Kumar	Kannada	
2026	Anantha	Vardhan Rao	Tamil	

== Television ==
List of Jagapathi Babu television credits
Year	Title	Role	Network
2018	Gangstars	Kumar Das "KD"	Amazon Prime Video
2021–2022	Parampara	Chintalapudi Mohana Rao Naidu "Mohan"	Disney+ Hotstar
2025–present	Jayammu Nischayammu Raa with Jagapathi	Himself (host)	ZEE5

== As narrator ==
List of Jagapathi Babu film narration credits
Year	Title	Ref.
2008	Victory	
2010	Don Seenu	
2016	Janatha Garage	
2017	Balakrishnudu	

== As voice actor ==
List of Jagapathi Babu film dubbing credits
Year	Title	Role	Notes	Ref.
2016	The BFG	Runt/The Big Friendly Giant (BFG) played by Mark Rylance	Telugu version	
2019	The Lion King	Scar (originally voiced by Chiwetel Ejiofor)	Telugu Version	
