= Kaveri (actress) =

Indian actress

- Born: Kavumbhagom, Thiruvalla, Kerala, India
- Other names: Kalyani, Kaveri
- Occupation: Actress
- Years active: 1986–2019
- Spouse: Surya Kiran (divorced)

Kaveri, also known as Kalyani, is an Indian actress and film producer who mostly appeared in Malayalam, Telugu, Tamil and Kannada language films. Starting her career in the mid-90s, she had a critically acclaimed performance in the 2002 Telugu film Avunu Valliddaru Ista Paddaru!, that fetched her the Nandi Award for Best Actress.

== Early life ==
Kaveri was born into a Malayali family settled in Kavumbhagom, Thiruvalla, Kerala. Her father, Muralidharan, worked at Kerala State Road Transport Corporation.

== Career ==
Kaveri started her film career as a child artist in Malayalam films, and then appeared in several Malayalam, Tamil, Telugu and Kannada language films. After playing lead and supporting roles in Malayalam, Tamil films, she enacted female lead roles in several Malayalam, Tamil, Kannada, and Telugu language films.

She has won the Kerala state television award for best actress in 2002 for Anna and Nandi Award for Best Actress for her performance in Avunu Valliddaru Ista Paddaru (2002). She is perhaps best known for her appearances and critically acclaimed performances in films such as Vasanthiyum Lakshmiyum Pinne Njaanum, Samudhiram, Avunu Valliddaru Ista Paddaru, Kabaddi Kabaddi and Kasi.

== Personal life ==
Kaveri was married to Surya Kiran and later they separated.

== Awards ==
Kerala State Television Awards

- 2002–Kerala State Television Award for Best Actress – Annaa

Nandi Awards

- 2002–Nandi Award for Best Actress – Avunu Valliddaru Ista Paddaru

SICA Awards

- 2002– SICA Awards for Best Actress – Avunu Valliddaru Ista Paddaru

== Filmography ==
Year	Film	Role	Language	Notes
1986	Ammanamkili		Malayalam	
1988	Kakkothikkavile Appooppan Thaadikal	Young Valsala	Malayalam	As child artist
1989	Yaathrayude Anthyam	child in the bus	Malayalam	As child artist
1990	Vembanaad	Younger daughter	Malayalam	As child artist
1990	Marupuram		Malayalam	As child artist
1991	Vishnulokam		Malayalam	As child artist
1992	Sadayam	Lathika	Malayalam	As child artist
1992	Champakulam Thachan	Devi's friend	Malayalam	
1993	Bhoomi Geetham	Subhashini	Malayalam	
1993	Porutham	Asha	Malayalam	
1993	Midhunam	Sulochana's sister	Malayalam	
1993	Avan Ananthapadmanabhan	Mani	Malayalam	
1994	Sukham Sukhakaram/Ipadikku Kaadhal	-	Malayalam/Tamil	
1994	Vardhakya Puranam	Sathi	Malayalam	
1995	Oru Abhibhashakante Case Diary	Seetha	Malayalam	
1996	Udhyanapalakan	Indu	Malayalam	Debut as lead actress
1996	Devaraagam	–	Malayalam	
1997	Guru	Syamanthaka	Malayalam	India's official entry to the Oscars
1997	Kilukil Pambaram	Rohini	Malayalam	
1997	Guru Sishyan	Radha	Malayalam	
1997	Manasam	Maya/Young Rajalakshmi	Malayalam	Dual Role
1997	Anubhoothi	Girija	Malayalam	
1997	Raajathanthram	Renu	Malayalam	
1997	Five Star Hospital	Raphael's lover	Malayalam	
1998	Graama Panchaayathu	Sunanda	Malayalam	
1999	Vasanthiyum Lakshmiyum Pinne Njaanum	Lakshmi	Malayalam	
1999	Thachiledathu Chundan	Indhu	Malayalam	
1999	Sparsham	Arundhathi	Malayalam	
1999	Sambhrama	Manju	Kannada	
1999	Chaithrada Chiguru	Shilpa	Kannada	Karnataka State Award for Best Film
2000	Kannukkul Nilavu	Gayathri	Tamil	
2000	Appu	Pooja	Tamil	
2000	Pennin Manathai Thottu	Meena	Tamil	
2000	Mark Antony	Reeja/Kunjipennu	Malayalam	
2000	Dada Sahib	Ayisha	Malayalam	
2001	Ninaikkatha Naalillai	Kausalya	Tamil	
2001	Samudhiram	Rasamani	Tamil	
2001	Swarnachirakumay	-	Malayalam	
2001	Kasi	Kaveri	Tamil	
2002	Seshu	Abitha Kuchalambha	Telugu	
2002	Avunu Valliddaru Ista Paddaru	Swathi	Telugu	Winner, Nandi Award for Best Actress; SICA Award For Best Actress; Nominated – Filmfare Award for Best Telugu Actress
2003	Pellamtho Panenti	Kalyani	Telugu	
2003	Vasantham	Julie	Telugu	Nominated –Filmfare Award for Best Supporting Actress – Telugu
2003	Kabaddi Kabaddi	Kaveri	Telugu	
2003	Punnagai Poove	Nithya	Tamil	
2003	Thillana Thillana	Vandana	Malayalam	
2003	Dongodu	Rukhmini Naidu	Telugu	
2004	Letha Manasulu	Dhanalakshmi	Telugu	
2004	Pedababu	Neelaveni	Telugu	
2004	Rama Krishna	Sita	Kannada	
2004	Nothing But Life	Vandana	English	
2005	Dhana 51		Telugu	Guest appearance
2005	Pandem	Seeta	Telugu	
2005	Kannadi Pookal	Meera Sakthivel	Tamil	
2005	Sravanamasam	Kavita Reddy	Telugu	
2005	Made in USA	Vandana	Malayalam	
2006	Hope	Pooja Rao	Telugu	National Film Award for Best Film on Other Social Issues
2007	Operation Duryodhana	Mahesh's wife	Telugu	
2007	Kangaroo	Nancy	Malayalam	
2007	Lakshyam	Bose's wife	Telugu	Nominated –Filmfare Award for Best Supporting Actress – Telugu
2007	Munna	Munna's mother	Telugu	
2008	Raksha	Aarthi Rajeev	Telugu	
2009	Chapter 6	Sathyabhama	Telugu	Also producer
2009	Najarana		Telugu	
2010	Janakan	Nirmala	Malayalam	
2010	April Fool	Indhu	Malayalam	Cameo
2010	Kutti Pisasu	Savithri	Tamil	
2010	Cara Majaka	Savithri	Telugu	
2010	Brahmalokam To Yamalokam Via Bhulokam	Goddess Saraswati	Telugu	
2012	Onamalu	Rukmini	Telugu	
2012	Agnatham	Anamika	Telugu	
2014	Legend	Jitendra's wife	Telugu	
2014	Ra Ra... Krishnayya	Jaggu Bhai's wife	Telugu	
2014	O Manishi Katha	Sita	Telugu	
2016	Traffic	Maria	Hindi	
2017	Hebbuli	Anuradha	Kannada	
2017	Winner	Lakshmi	Telugu	
2017	Karuppan	Muthu	Tamil	
2018	Geetha Govindam	Govind's mother	Telugu	Uncredited photo only
2018	Taxiwaala	Shiva's sister-in-law	Telugu	
2018	Chalakkudykkaran Changathy	Herself	Malayalam	Uncredited photo only
2019	Yatra	Kavitha's mother	Telugu	

== TV career ==
Year	Serial	Role	Language	Channel
2012–2013	Thyagam	Abhirami	Tamil	Sun TV
2010-2011	Auto Bharathi	Bharathi	Telugu	Gemini TV
2002	Anna	Anna	Malayalam	Kairali TV
	Pranayam		Malayalam	Surya TV Telefilm
	Appooppanthadi		Malayalam	
