= Douthyam =

- Poster designed by Gayathri Ashokan
- Directed by: S. Anil Kumar
- Written by: Gayathri Ashokan
- Produced by: C. V. Ramakrishnan
- Starring: Mohanlal; Suresh Gopi; Parvathy Jayaram; Lissy; Vijayaraghavan; M. G. Soman; Prathapachandran; Babu Antony
- Cinematography: Jayanan Vincent; J. Williams; A. Vincent
- Edited by: K. Narayanan
- Music by: S. P. Venkatesh
- Production company: Saffron Movie Makers
- Distributed by: Chalachitra
- Release date: 9 February 1989
- Running time: 114 minutes
- Country: India
- Language: Malayalam

Douthyam (transl. Mission) is a 1989 Indian Malayalam-language action-adventure film directed by S. Anil Kumar and written by Gayathri Ashokan. The film stars Mohanlal, Suresh Gopi, Parvathy, and Babu Antony. The film attracted media attention for the action subject as the script was done by the poster designer Gayathri Ashokan.

== Plot ==
Douthyam tells the gripping story of Captain Roy Jacob Thomas (Mohanlal), a courageous and determined army officer who is called upon for a critical mission. A military aircraft has crash-landed deep in the remote forest, carrying sensitive documents and a team of soldiers, including his fellow officer and friend, Captain Suresh Nair (Suresh Gopi). With time running out and enemy forces closing in, Roy is sent in alone to rescue the survivors and retrieve the classified material.

What begins as a mission quickly turns into a brutal test of survival. Roy must navigate dense, unforgiving jungle terrain while facing real dangers, from wild nature to armed enemies. The forest becomes a living, breathing threat, where every step is uncertain and every sound could signal danger.

As Roy encounters exhaustion and ambushes, he continues his mission. Driven by loyalty to his comrades, he completes the journey under physical and emotional strain.

== Cast ==
- Mohanlal as Capt. Roy Jacob Thomas
- Suresh Gopi as Capt. Suresh G. Nair
- Parvathy Jayaram as Viji
- Lissy as Lisa
- Vijayaraghavan as Capt. Rajiv Kumar
- M. G. Soman as Col. Madhavan Nair
- Babu Antony as Gang Leader
- Prathapachandran as Major Karunakaran
- Sreenath as Shekhar
- Kollam Thulasi as Army Officer Sukumaran Marar
- Kalabhavan Rahman as Gang Member

== Adaptations ==
The film was dubbed into Tamil as Captain Dhevaram and was well received. The film was remade into Telugu as Adavilo Abhimanyudu, starring Jagapathi Babu, produced by S. Anil Kumar.

== Gallery ==
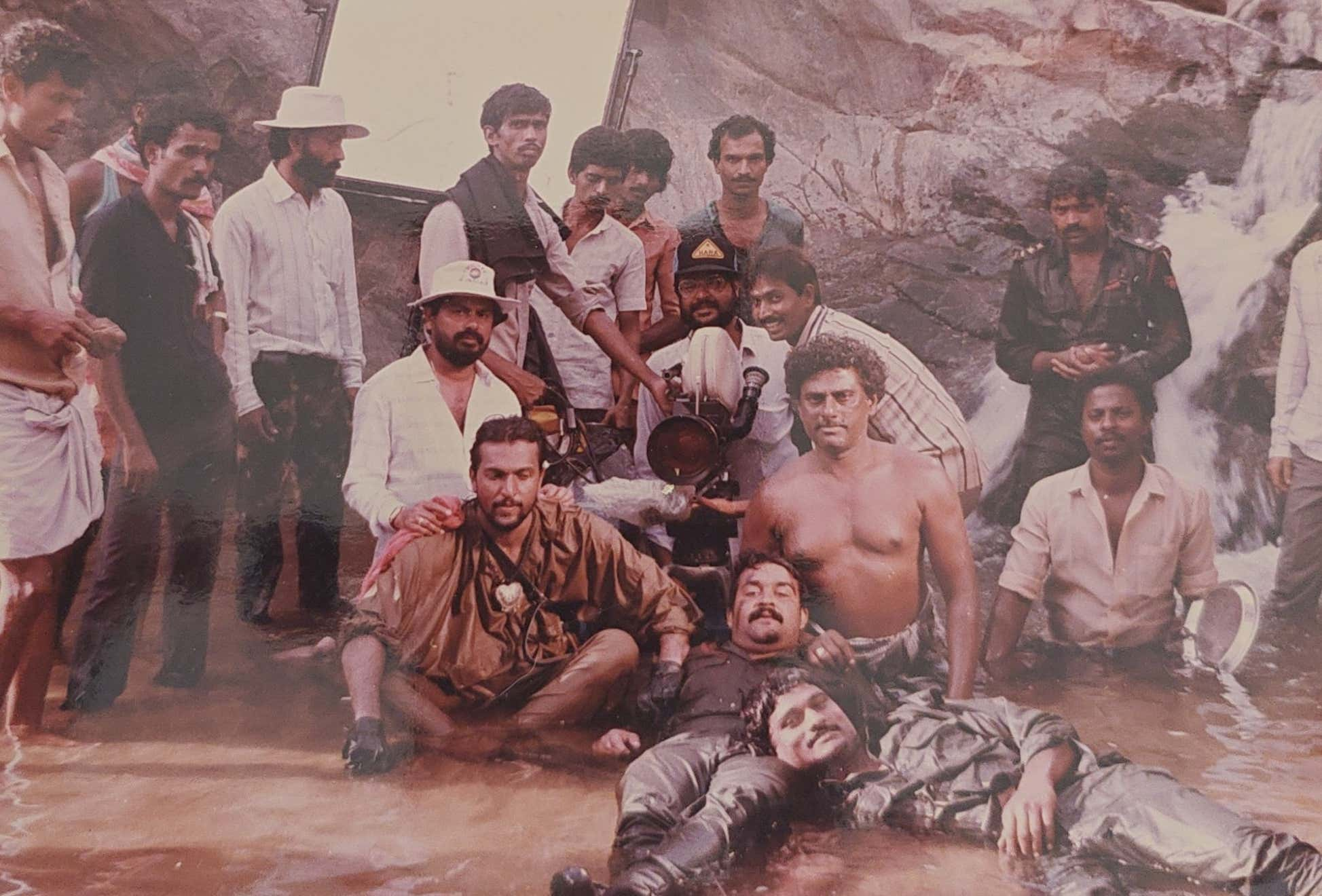
Wrapping up shooting with the cast and crew of Douthyam (1989).

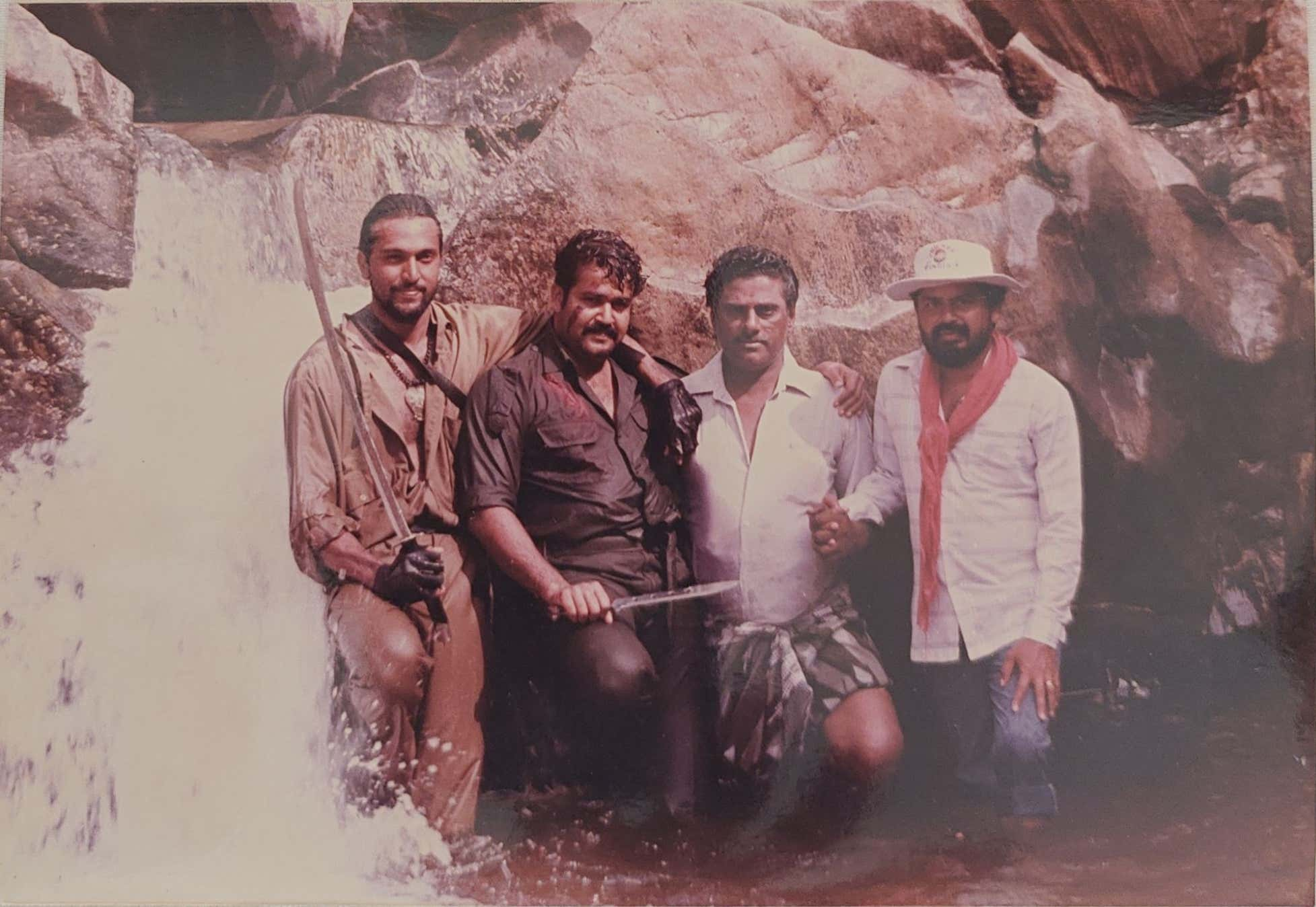
Director Anil Kumar pictured with Babu Antony & Mohanlal, Douthyam (1989).

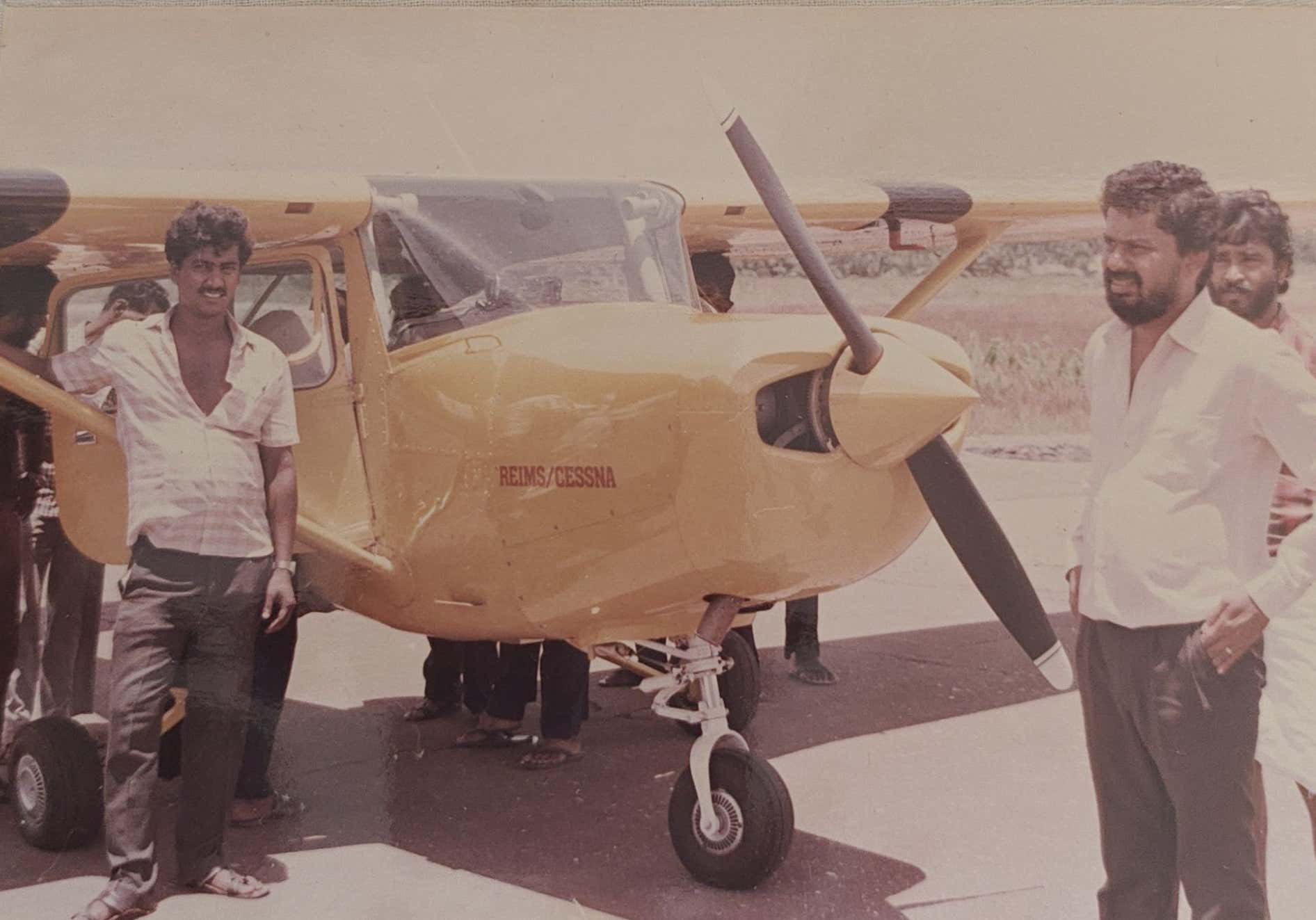
Director Anil Kumar on set of Douthyam (1989).

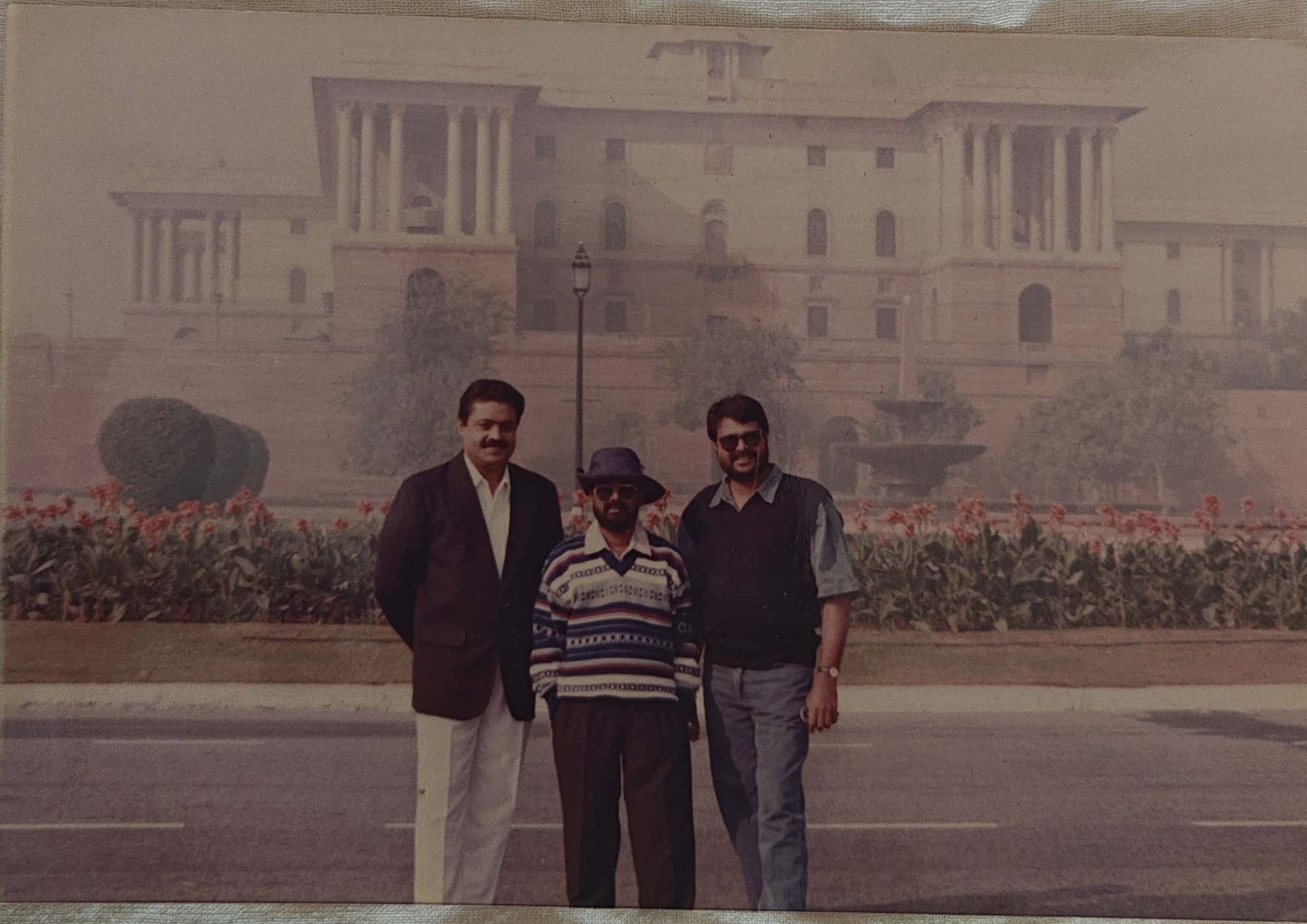
Director Anil Kumar pictured with Suresh Gopi (left) & cinematographer Jayanan Vincent (right).
