= Avunu Valliddaru Ista Paddaru! =

Indian film

- Movie Poster
- Directed by: Vamsy
- Screenplay by: Vamsy
- Story by: Gooduru Viswanatha Sastry
- Produced by: Valluripalli Ramesh Babu
- Starring: Ravi Teja; Kalyani; Prasanna; Krishna Bhagavan
- Narrated by: Sankaramanchi Parthasarathi
- Cinematography: K. Rajendra Prasad
- Edited by: Basva Paidireddy
- Music by: Chakri
- Production company: Maharshi Cinema
- Release date: 2 August 2002
- Country: India
- Language: Telugu

Avunu... Valliddaru Ishta Paddaru! (transl. Yes, they both liked each other!) is a 2002 Indian Telugu-language romantic drama film written and directed by Vamsy. It won many awards including the Andhra Pradesh State Nandi Award. The film's music is composed by Chakri.

== Plot ==
Morampudi Anil Sai Kumar is a well-educated but unemployed youth who comes to the city in search of a job. After attending a hundred interviews, he is offered a night watchman job by an employer who is impressed by Anil's honesty and dignity of labour. Anil starts looking for accommodation in a nearby colony. Satyanandam stays in the colony and takes care of a house of his friend living in America, collecting rent for him. Swathi stays in that house and works in a software firm. Satyanandam is interested in collecting a second rent for himself and offers the house to Anil on the condition that he can stay there only during the day, without Swathi's knowledge. Anil agrees and moves into the house. Anil is impressed by the way the room is decorated and artfully arranged and understands that the woman living there has a very good taste.

The colony is full of comical characters very typical of Vamsy's films. Satyanandam is a miser trying to make money by what ever means he can. His crazy brother-in-law keeps creating trouble for him and others in the colony. The washer-man sells his crazy ideas to people. Potti Raju keeps making several attempts to start his own business but always ends up in a loss. The interaction of these characters with each other and the humorous situations that arise form the backbone to the movie's story line.

After a month, Anil accidentally breaks Swathi's porcelain artefact in the room and writes a letter to her, apologising for his mistake. Swathi comes across the letter, and learns that someone else has been staying in her room without her knowledge. But she takes a liking to Anil's honesty and lets him stay in her house when she is at work during the day. Both keep communicating through letters and become friends, gradually falling in love without seeing each other. Anil and Swathi also happen to meet in a restaurant when she wrongly accuses him of stealing her purse. They start off as enemies but become friends without realising that they are roommates, too. One day, Anil discovers that the friend he has been meeting outside is none other than his own roommate Swathi, but does not reveal this to her, wanting to surprise her at the time of marriage.

Anand, the brother of Swathi's office manager takes a liking to her, and sends his father to her adopted parents in the village seeking a matrimonial alliance with Swathi. Swathi's poor parents express interest, as it would help them to get their two younger daughters married. Swathi is in a fix, as she wants to help her father who adopted her and brought her up despite his poverty, but she cannot let go of her love for Anil. She expresses her dilemma to Anil as a friend, without any knowledge that it is with him that she is in love actually. Anil realises that Swathi's family would benefit financially from her marriage to Anand. He leaves a letter in the room telling her that he is deserting Swathi and going after a wealthy girl. As a friend he comforts Swathi and convinces her to marry Anand. However, Swathi learns the truth in the end through Anil's friend and unites with Anil.

== Cast ==
- Ravi Teja as Morampudi Venkata Anil Sai Kumar
- Kalyani as Swathi
- Prasanna as Ananth
- Kota Srinivasa Rao as Ram Mohan Rao (Ananth's father).
- Banerjee as Kishore (Ananth's brother).
- Mallikarjuna Rao as Nookaraju
- M. S. Narayana as NV Subba Rao alias Gali Dumaram
- Tanikella Bharani as Anil's maternal uncle
- Surya as Swathi's adoptive father
- Jaya Prakash Reddy as Police Constable
- Krishna Bhagavan as Chittibabu
- Kondavalasa Lakshmana Rao as Subba Raju alias Pottiraju
- Siva Reddy as America Prasad
- Preeti Nigam as Nukaalu Nookaraju's wife
- Jeeva as Satyanandam
- L.B. Sriram
- Dharmavarapu Subrahmanyam Recruiting Interviewer.

== Music ==
The music was composed by Chakri. It was manufactured and marketed by Supreme Recording. The lyricists involved with the movie are: "Sirivennela" sitaramasastry, Sai Sriharsha, Chandra Bose, and Bhaskarbatla Ravikumar; with Sai Sriharsha penning the famous "Ennenno Varnaalu" song, and Sirivennela Sitaramasastry penning the "Naalo Nenu Lene Lenu" song.

Song	Singer	Lyricist
"Vennello Hai Hai"	Chakri	Sai Sriharsha
"Raa Rammani"	SP Balasubrahmanyam, Kousalya	Chandrabose
"Naalo Nenu Lene Lenu"	Sandeep, Kousalya	Sirivennela Sitaramasastry
"Pogadamaaku Athigaa"	SP Balasubrahmanyam, Kousalya	Sai Sriharsha
"Sitakoka Chilukaa"	Chakri, Kousalya	Bhaskarabatla Ravikumar
"Ennenno Varnaalu"	SP Balasubrahmanyam, Kousalya	Sai Sriharsha
"Madi Ninduga Manchitanam"	SP Balasubrahmanyam, Kousalya	Sai Sriharsha
"Yemi Ee Bhaagyamo"	Kousalya	Sai Sriharsha
"Nuziveedu Soniaa"	Ravi Varma	Bhaskarabatla Ravikumar

== Reception ==
A critic from Sify opined that "On the whole the film is a good entertainer". Jeevi of Idlebrain.com wrote that "Made with a different story, narrated in a creative manner, 'Avunu Valliddaru Ista Paddaru' will entertain you in a big way, if you have taste of class films and situational comedy sequences". Kiran Nadella of Full Hyderabad stated that "AVI is hilarious without straining to be, with a clichéd but entertaining storyline and terrific cast".

== Awards ==
Nandi Awards

- Best Actress – Kalyani
- Best Costume Designer – Ganapathi
