= Gaayam =

- DVD cover
- Directed by: Ram Gopal Varma
- Written by: Posani Krishna Murali (dialogues)
- Screenplay by: Ram Gopal Varma
- Story by: Ram Gopal Varma; Mani Ratnam
- Produced by: Yarlagadda Surendra
- Starring: Jagapathi Babu; Revathi; Urmila Matondkar
- Cinematography: Rasool Ellore
- Edited by: Shankar
- Music by: Sri
- Production company: S. S. Creations
- Release date: 22 April 1993
- Running time: 136 minutes
- Country: India
- Language: Telugu

Gaayam (transl. The Wound/Injury) is a 1993 Indian Telugu-language political crime thriller film, based on the 1980s Vijayawada Gang Warfare. Directed by Ram Gopal Varma and co-written by himself and Mani Ratnam, it stars Jagapathi Babu, Revathi, Urmila Matondkar with music composed by Sri. Upon its release, the film became commercially successful at box-office and won six state Nandi Awards in 1993. The film was dubbed and released in Tamil as Desam.

The film is inspired by The Godfather (1972) which is based on Mario Puzo's novel The Godfather (1969).

== Plot ==
The film opens with Durga, a powerful crime lord who runs a parallel justice system to aid the needy who are failed by the law. When a victim approaches him regarding the molestation of his daughter, Durga severely beats the perpetrators. A newly appointed police officer, Inspector Bharadwaj, briefly apprehends Durga but releases him shortly after. During the encounter, Durga spots his former college sweetheart, Anitha, triggering a wave of memories. Years prior, Anitha was an idealistic journalism student who fell in love with Durga. Knowing his brother, Mohana Krishna, was a notorious hoodlum, Anitha agreed to marry Durga on the strict condition that he would never choose a life of crime, a promise he readily made.

However, the political rivalry between Mohana Krishna and a wicked corporator, Gurunarayana, culminated in Mohana Krishna's assassination. Enraged, Durga retaliated by systematically executing his brother's killers, effectively seizing control of the city’s underworld. Though Durga's cousin Chitra harbored unrequited love for him and supported his actions, Anitha was devastated by his choice of vengeance and severed their relationship. Years later, Anitha has become a dedicated investigative journalist and is now married to Bharadwaj, while Gurunarayana has risen to the rank of a powerful MLA.

In the present day, Durga aims to transition into a legitimate political career. To thwart his ambitions, Gurunarayana arranges for Sarkar, a ruthless hitman involved in Mohana Krishna's murder, to be released from prison. A brutal gang war ensues, peaking when Sarkar orchestrates a mass shooting targeting Durga inside a crowded movie theater. Horrified by the civilian casualties, Anitha confronts Durga to make him abandon his violent lifestyle, but he remains indifferent. Seeking transparency, Anitha subsequently confesses her past relationship with Durga to her husband, Bharadwaj.

When Durga later tracks down Sarkar, he aborts the assault upon noticing Bharadwaj's arrival. Concurrently, Anitha interviews Gurunarayana regarding the theater massacre. The situation escalates when a wounded Sarkar arrives at the politician's residence seeking asylum, sparking a physical confrontation between Bharadwaj and Gurunarayana as the latter attempts to conceal his criminal ties. Anitha compiles damning evidence of the collusion, but her corrupt editor repeatedly suppresses the story. Gurunarayana later abducts Chitra to bait Durga, successfully framing him for an engineered crime. Though Bharadwaj tries to protect a key state witness, Gurunarayana has the witness assassinated, prompting a frustrated Bharadwaj to formally arrest and incarcerate Durga.

Aiming to destabilize the state government and secure the Chief Minister's seat, Gurunarayana orchestrates mass religious riots. During the communal violence, Bharadwaj kills several of Gurunarayana’s henchmen in encounters. When a furious Gurunarayana berates the police department, Bharadwaj publicly slaps him. Anitha captures the entire conspiracy on film, but her editor betrays her, surrendering the evidence directly to the politician.

On the eve of the Ganesh immersion festival, Gurunarayana plans a controlled suicide bomb blast near his own convoy to garner public sympathy. Having intercepted intelligence of the conspiracy, upper police management secretly releases Durga to dismantle the plot. As Bharadwaj manages the massive festival crowds, Gurunarayana sadistically informs Anitha that he intends to have her husband killed in the impending chaos. Desperate, Anitha appeals to Durga for help, arriving at the festival grounds with Chitra. They deduce that Sarkar is directing the operation from an enclosed cinema hall. Working together, Durga and Bharadwaj infiltrate the location and neutralize the threat, detonating the bomb at a safe distance away from the public. Sarkar is killed in the confrontation, while a severely injured Gurunarayana is captured and subsequently sentenced. The film concludes with Anitha thanking Durga, who resolves to abandon his criminal empire and embark on a peaceful path.

== Cast ==
- Jagapathi Babu as Durga
- Revathi as Anitha
- Kota Srinivasa Rao as Guru Narayan
- Sivakrishna as Inspector Bharadwaj
- Urmila Matondkar as Chitra
- Charan Raj as Mohana Krishna
- Tanikella Bharani as Lawyer Saab
- Annapoorna as Chitra's mother
- M. Balaiah as Charigaaru
- Rami Reddy as Sarkar
- Uttej as Yadgiri
- Banerjee as Banerjee
- Narsing Yadav as Narsing
- Sirivennela Seetharama Sastry as Journalist Swamy
- Gummadi
- Tarzan as Srisailam
- Narayana Rao
- Ragini

== Production ==
The film's story was written by Ram Gopal Varma and Mani Ratnam together, which is inspired from the book The Godfather. Varma faced financial troubles after the failure of Antham and Raatri and was also producing Money that time so he approached Surendra to do a film for his company which eventually became Gaayam.

Varma decided to do Gaayam with Jagapathi Babu after he was impressed with a fight sequence he did for the film Peddarikam. This was the first film that Jagapathi Babu dubbed for himself. The initial version of the script did not have the character of Chitra, it was Ratnam who suggested this character while also suggesting Urmila Matondkar for the role.

The song "Alupannadi Unda" was shot at R. K. Beach and Jagadamba Theatre while the climax was shot at Vikranth Theatre in Hyderabad. The choreography of the song "Cheli Meeda" was done by Urmila herself.

== Soundtrack ==
Gaayam

Soundtrack album by Sri
- Released: 1993
- Recorded: 1993
- Genre: Soundtrack
- Length: 25:45
- Label: SURYA Audio
- Producer: Sri

The soundtrack was composed by Sri, son of composer Chakravarthy in his debut. Lyrics were penned by Sirivennela Sitarama Sastry. Music released on Surya Audio Company.

Track listing
No.	Title	Singer(s)	Length
1.	"Nizamu Pori"	Mano, Chitra, Eeswar	5:20
2.	"Niggadeesi Adugu"	S. P. Balasubrahmanyam	2:06
3.	"Alupannadi Unda"	Chitra	5:41
4.	"Surajyamavaleni Swarajyamendukani"	S. P. Balasubrahmanyam	4:56
5.	"Chelimeeda Chitikedu"	Mano, Chitra	6:59
Total length:			25:45

== Awards ==
Nandi Awards

- Best Supporting Actress – Urmila Matondkar
- Best Villain – Kota Srinivasa Rao
- Best Lyricist – Sirivennela Sitaramasastri
- Best Cinematographer – Rasool Ellore
- Best Editor – Shankar
- Best Audiographer – Srinivas

== Box office ==
The film's success established Jagapathi Babu as one of the popular actors in Telugu cinema.

== Sequel ==
After the film's success, Ram Gopal Varma and Jagapathi Babu planned to release a sequel titled Gaayam 2. Ram Gopal Varma was the producer in the sequel while Praveen Sri was the director. Vimala Raman was the heroine as Kota Srinivasa Rao again plays as the antagonist.
