= Soorya Gayathri =

- Directed by: S. Anil Kumar
- Written by: John Paul
- Produced by: M. Mani
- Starring: Mohanlal; Urvashi; Parvathy; Nedumudi Venu
- Cinematography: Ramachandra Babu
- Edited by: V. P. Krishnan
- Music by: Raveendran
- Production company: Aroma Movies
- Release date: 1992
- Running time: 110 minutes
- Country: India
- Language: Malayalam

Soorya Gayathri (സൂര്യ ഗായത്രി, transl. Gayathri of Sun), is a 1992 Indian Malayalam-language drama film directed by S. Anil Kumar, written by John Paul, produced by M. Mani, and starring Mohanlal in the lead role. The songs were composed by Raveendran. The film is a revenge story, of a father who goes after the murderers of his son.

== Plot ==
Dr. Balasubrahmaniam, a respected physician, was married at 26 but lost his wife to pneumonia just three years later. Left to raise their young son Raju alone, he devotes his life to both his profession and his child. As Raju grows into a bright teenager, the father often reminisces about the love he shared with his late wife, the joy of becoming a parent, and the grief of her untimely passing.

When his son tops the state in his Class 12 board exams, Dr. Balasubrahmaniam is overjoyed and hosts a celebration in his honor. Hoping his son will follow in his footsteps, he asks about his future plans. However, the boy chooses a different path, enrolling in an engineering college instead of pursuing medicine.

Life takes a tragic turn when the son inadvertently offends a group of seniors at college. What begins as a harmless exchange escalates into violence. During an incident of ragging, Raju defends a group of students from the seniors but ends up getting bullied himself. The seniors then chase him to the top of the school building and he jumps down to save himself. He sustains critical head injuries and, despite efforts to save him, dies a few days later.

Shattered by the loss, Dr. Balasubrahmaniam is consumed by grief and seeks justice for his son, setting him on a path of emotional reckoning and revenge. But eventually, he lets go of his grudge and reluctantly spares the seniors.

== Cast ==
- Mohanlal as Dr. Balasubrahmaniam
- Urvashi as Rugmini
- Parvathy as Dr. Sreelakshmi
- Nedumudi Venu as Manisankar Iyer
- Anu Anand as Raju Viswam (Dubbed by Krishnachandran)
- Major Sundarrajan as Viswesara Iyyer
- Sukumari as Paatti
- Bahadoor as Kunjali
- Kollam Thulasi as College Principal
- Janardhanan as Babu Karunakaran
- Thodupuzha Vasanthi as Nurse
- Jose Pellissery as Kuriakose
- Jagannathan as Ramanathan

== Soundtrack ==
The film has songs composed by Raveendran, with lyrics by O. N. V. Kurup.

	Song	Singer(s)	Raga
1	"Swaras"	K. J. Yesudas, K. S. Chitra	
2	"Aalila Manjalil" (Duet)	K. J. Yesudas, K. S. Chitra	Abhogi
3	"Aalila Manjalil" (Male)	K. J. Yesudas	Abhogi
4	"Aalila Manjalil" (Female)	K. S. Chitra	Abhogi
5	"Ragam Thaanam"	K. J. Yesudas, Krishnachandran, K. S. Chitra	[Hamsanaadham]
6	"Thamburu Kulir Choodiyo"	K. J. Yesudas, K. S. Chitra, Mohanlal	Revagupti
7	"Ya Kundendu Thusharahara"	K. S. Chitra	

== Gallery ==
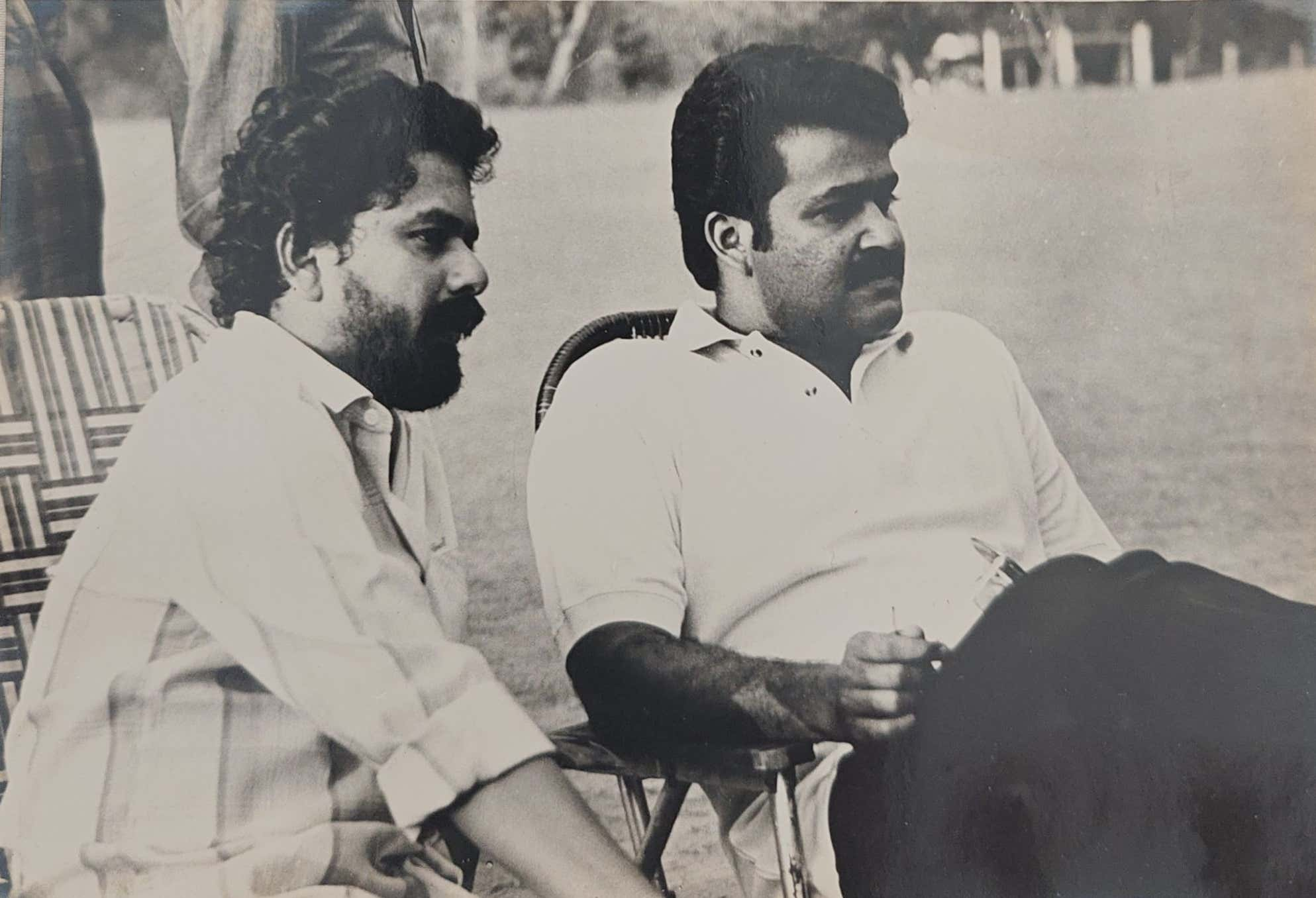
S. Anil Kumar on the set of Soorya Gayathri (1992) with Mohanlal.

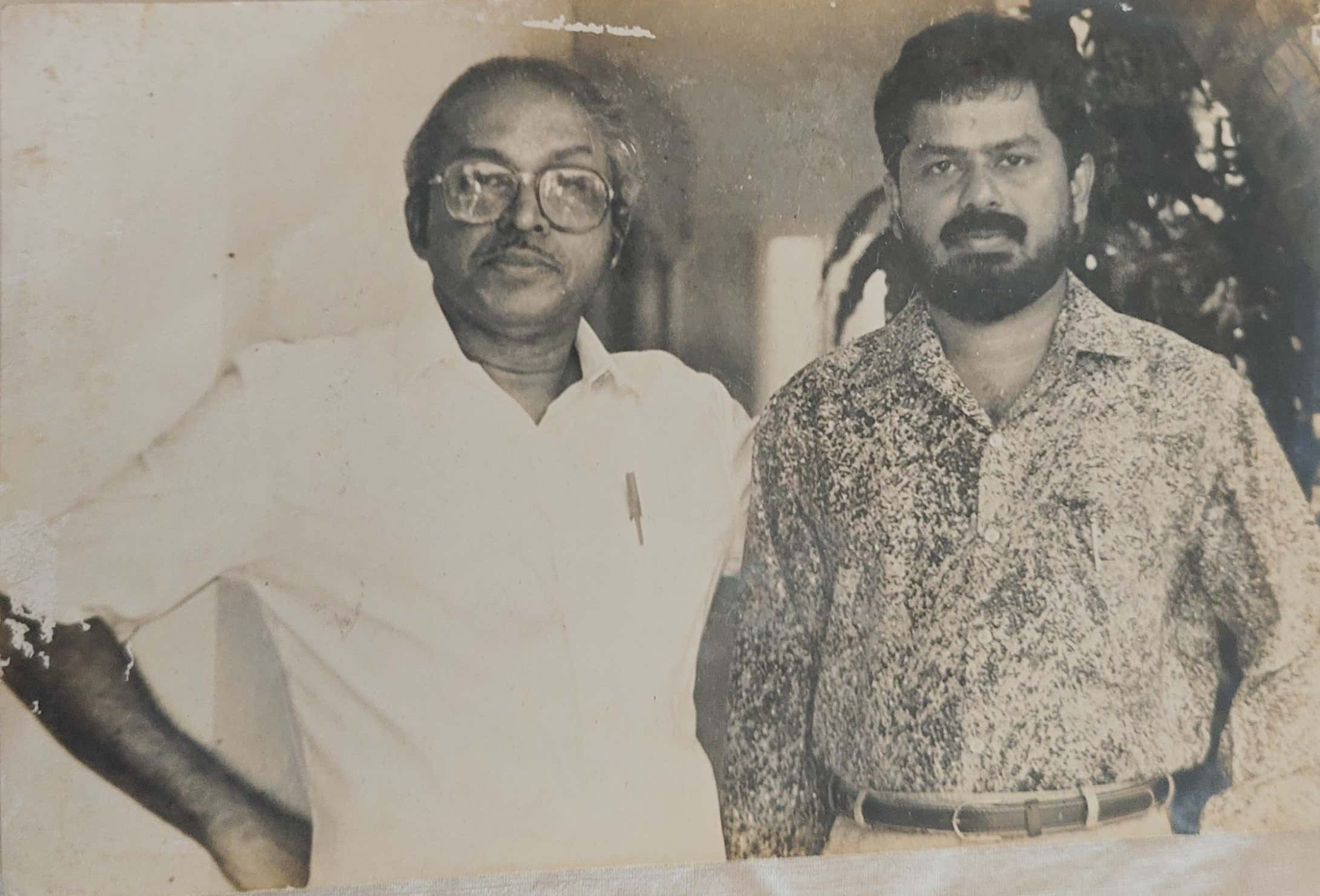
S. Anil Kumar after the shooting of Soorya Gayathri (1992) with O. N. V. Kurup.
