= S. Anil =

Indian film director

Anil Kumar
- Born: Kerala, India
- Other name: Douthyam Anil
- Occupations: Film director; screenwriter
- Years active: 1986 – present

S. Anil Kumar, also known as Douthyam Anil and Anil Vakkam, is an Indian film director who works in Malayalam films. He is known for his action films. He is best known for directing the action-adventure film Douthyam (1989).

== Career ==
He made his debut as a director in 1986 with Adiverukal, starring Mohanlal. His other films with Mohanlal are Douthyam and Sooryagayathri. Another of Anil's Mohanlal films, Brahmaa, was dropped after the first schedule. The same film was later remade by I. V. Sasi as The City with Suresh Gopi.

== Filmography ==
=== As director ===
Year	Film	Writer	Notes
1986	Adiverukal	Peruvanthanam Sukumaran	
1989	Douthyam		
1989	Adavilo Abhimanyudu	Ashok	Telugu film
1992	Soorya Gayathri	John Paul Puthusery	
1997	Gangothri	Shaji Pandavath	
