= O Manishi Katha =

- Movie Poster
- Directed by: Radha Swamy Avula
- Screenplay by: Radha Swamy Avula
- Story by: Radha Swamy Avula
- Produced by: Balabhai Patel
- Starring: Jagapati Babu; Kalyani
- Cinematography: G. Ranganath
- Edited by: K. Venkateswrulu
- Music by: Vijay Kurakula
- Production company: Om Shiv Films
- Release date: 19 December 2014
- Country: India
- Language: Telugu

O Manishi Katha (transl. Story of a Person) is 2014 Telugu-language philosophical film, produced by Balabhai Patel on Om Shiv Films banner and directed by Radha Swamy Avula. Starring Jagapati Babu and Kalyani, with music composed by Vijay Kurakula.

== Plot ==
The film deals with the three gunas: satvika, rajas and tamas. Ramu, who runs a hotel in a village, falls in love with Sita Mahalakshmi. With blessings from their parents, they get married. A person enters into their happy life, and this leads to the suicide of Sita. What are the reasons for Sita committing suicide? How Ramu will take revenge on the person who caused Sita to commit suicide is the rest of the story.

== Cast ==
- Jagapati Babu as Ramu
- Kalyani as Sita
- Ashmitha Karnani
- Ravi Varma as the lawyer
- Suman Shetty
- Kondavalasa Lakshmana Rao

== Soundtrack ==
O Manishi Katha

Film score by Vijay Kurakula
- Released: 2014
- Genre: Soundtrack
- Length: 17:01
- Label: Aditya Music
- Producer: Vijay Kurakula

Music composed by Vijay Kurakula. Lyrics written by Suddala Ashok Teja. Music released on ADITYA Music Company.

No.	Title	Singer(s)	Length
1.	"Nemmadiga Nemmadiga"	Deepu, Geetha Madhuri	4:26
2.	"Seethaleni Ramuni Katha"	Suresh	3:34
3.	"Kalalaa Vacchi Veluge Icchi"	Krishna Chaitanya	3:32
4.	"Ye Mattitho Chesavura Brahma"	Balaji	3:43
5.	"Anadhaku Rakhi Katti"	Krishna Chaitanya	0:45
6.	"Karunaku Nuvvu Chirunama"	Balaji	0:42
Total length:			17:01
