= Gaayam 2 =

- Movie Poster
- Directed by: Praveen Sri
- Written by: Ravi Reddy Mallu
- Screenplay by: Rajendra Reddy
- Story by: Praveen Sri
- Produced by: Dr. C. Dharmakartha; Bharath Chowdary
- Starring: Jagapathi Babu; Vimala Raman
- Cinematography: Anil Bhandari
- Edited by: Prawin Pudi
- Music by: Ilaiyaraaja
- Production company: Kartha Creations
- Release date: 3 September 2010
- Running time: 132 minutes
- Country: India
- Language: Telugu

Gaayam 2 (transl. The Wound - 2) is a 2010 Indian Telugu-language crime film produced by Dr. C. Dharmakartha on Kartha Creations, presented by Ram Gopal Varma and directed by Praveen Sri. Jagapathi Babu, Vimala Raman and the music is composed by Ilayaraja. It is a sequel to the 1993 film Gaayam, and partly inspired by 2005 American film A History of Violence.

== Plot ==
The film begins in Bangkok, where Ram runs a food court and lives with his wife, Vidya & son Chaitanya. Once psychopath killers strike the restaurant, which forecasts on the media. Watching it, Guru Narayana stuns in India as he resembles his old arch-rival Durga, who is declared dead. So, with their lawyer Saab, his son Shankar Narayana starts annoying Ram by using several means to expose his identity, but in vain. Ergo, they kidnap Chaitanya, and it compels Ram to open when Vidya deserts as he conceals his thug's life. Anyhow, she asks for an apology after being aware of the fact, i.e., that Chaitanya is the son of ex-lover Anitha, and he lost everyone in a blast planted by Guru Narayana. Before dying, Anitha takes a word from him to quit the bloodshed life, which he does. As of now, Shankar Narayana & Lawyer Saab are back with a brutal attack on them. Thus, Durga is behind them to keep a dead end to this violence.

Meanwhile, Guru Narayana again formed a non-allied group and created public riots to achieve his dream of being Chief Minister. Parallelly, Durga starts his murder spree when Shankar Narayana hides. Plus, for the offset, Guru Narayana hires a hooligan, Aziz Pasha, and a war erupts. After a while, Durga senses a mole, his friend ACP Murthy, by showing danger to his family. Here, Durga plays the double game by posing Lawyer Saab as the hoodwink before Shankar Narayana. As a result, he unveils and kills Lawyer Saab, whom Durga blows. Knowing it, enraged Guru Narayana raises mayhem while Durga tries to bar it and hits a shot. Guru Narayana meets him in the hospital, where he discloses his offenses and his way of deluding the public. Durga tactically exposes the conversation before the media, which awakens the people. At last, Durga stamps out Guru Narayana. Finally, the movie ends with Durga again molding as a crime lord.

== Cast ==
- Jagapathi Babu as Ram/Durga
- Kota Srinivasa Rao as Guru Narayan
- Kota Prasad as Shankar Narayan
- Tanikella Bharani as Lawyer Saab
- Vimala Raman as Vidya
- Ravi Kale as ACP Murthy
- Raghunatha Reddy as I.G.
- Harsha Vardhan as Harsha
- Jeeva as Pandyan
- Ajay as Aziz Pasha
- Annapoorna
- Pavansriram as Chaitanya
- Revathi in a cameo appearance as Anitha
- Sivakrishna in a cameo appearance as Inspector Bharadwaj

== Soundtrack ==
Gaayam 2

Film score by Ilaiyaraaja
- Released: 2011
- Genre: Soundtrack
- Length: 27:53
- Label: Aditya Music
- Producer: Ilaiyaraaja

Ilaiyaraaja chronology
Nannavanu (2010)	Gaayam 2 (2011)	Nandalala (2010)

The music for the film was composed by Ilaiyaraaja and released by ADITYA Music Company.

No.	Title	Lyrics	Singer(s)	Length
1.	"Endukamma Prema Prema"	Ananta Sriram	Sriram Parthasarathy, Geetha Madhuri	4:10
2.	"Masaka Venaka"	Bhaskarabhatla	Anitha Karthikeyan	5:07
3.	"Eluthundru Kodukulu"	Kaluva Sai	Vandemataram Srinivas	4:40
4.	"Andala Lokam"	Vanamali	Sriram Parthasarathi, Shashwathi	4:39
5.	"Rama Rajyam"	Kaluva Sai	Karthik	4:40
6.	"Kalagane Kannullo"	Vanamali	Ilaiyaraaja	4:24
Total length:				27:53
