= Gangothri (film) =

1997 film

- Directed by: S. Anil Kumar
- Written by: Shaji Pandavath
- Screenplay by: Shaji Pandavath
- Produced by: S. Satheesh
- Starring: Suresh Gopi; Roja; Sangeetha; Thilakan; Ratheesh; Rajan P. Dev
- Cinematography: Jayanan Vincent
- Edited by: L. Bhoominathan
- Music by: S. P. Venkatesh
- Production company: Golden Movies
- Distributed by: Golden Movies
- Release date: 17 May 1997
- Country: India
- Language: Malayalam

Gangothri is a 1997 Indian Malayalam-language film, directed by P. Anil and produced by S. Satheesh. The film stars Suresh Gopi, Roja Selvamani, Sangeetha, Thilakan, Ratheesh and Rajan P. Dev. The film has musical score by S. P. Venkatesh. It marked the Malayalam debut of Roja. The film was dubbed into Telugu as Political War.

== Plot ==
Adv. Sarathchandran fights against corruption, and criminal activities of politicians Krishnadas and Tripadi for dismantling their power.

== Cast ==
- Suresh Gopi as Adv. Sarathchandran
- Roja as Nandana Menon
- Sangeetha as Gopika Iyer
- Thilakan as Justice Ramaiyer
- Ratheesh as S. Krishnadas
- Devan as DCP Alexander IPS
- N. F. Varghese as Adv. Nambiar
- Sathyapriya
- Rajan P. Dev as Devarayar
- Kitty as Bhuvaneswar Tripadi
- Prathapachandran
- Hemanth Ravan as Mirza Kasim
- Kollam Thulasi as Adv. Krishnan Kartha
- Krishnakumar as Salim, Sarath's assistant
- Murali as Mukundan Menon
- Chali Pala as Maheedran
- Nandhu

== Soundtrack ==
The music of the film was composed by S. P. Venkatesh and the lyrics were written by Gireesh Puthenchery.

No.	Song	Singers	Lyrics	Length (m:ss)
1	"Chaandni Chaandni"	K. J. Yesudas	Gireesh Puthenchery	04:10
2	"Chaandni Chaandni"	K. J. Yesudas, K. S. Chithra	Gireesh Puthenchery	04:15
3	"Dhinna Dhinna"	Krishnachandran, Malgudi Subha	Gireesh Puthenchery	04:19
4	"Kunjikuyil Paattil"	M. G. Sreekumar, Sujatha Mohan	Gireesh Puthenchery	05:20
5	"Manjumalar Kunkumam"	K. S. Chithra	Gireesh Puthenchery	01:04
6	"Manjumalar Kunkumam"	K. J. Yesudas, K. S. Chithra	Gireesh Puthenchery	04:01
