= Mem Famous =

2023 Telugu romantic comedy film

- Official poster
- Directed by: Sumanth Prabhas
- Written by: Sumanth Prabhas
- Produced by: Anurag Reddy; Sharath Chandra; Chandru Manoharan
- Starring: Sumanth Prabhas; Saarya Laxman
- Cinematography: Shyam Dupati
- Edited by: Srujana Adusumilli
- Music by: Kalyan Nayak
- Production companies: Chai Bisket Films; Lahari Films
- Release date: 26 May 2023
- Running time: 149 minutes
- Country: India
- Language: Telugu

Mem Famous (transl. We're famous) is a 2023 Indian Telugu-language romantic action drama film written and directed by Sumanth Prabhas starring himself, Saarya Laxman, Mourya Nalagatla and Mani Aegurla in primary roles. The film received mixed reviews from critics.

== Plot ==
Three close friends, Mahesh, Durga, and Balakrishna, in their mid-20s from a small village in Bandanarsampalli, Telangana, live aimlessly and have no ambition in life. When the whole village has had enough of them and starts looking at them as a shameless bunch, the realisation sets in, and they decide to do something meaningful. With the help of a local leader, Jinka Venu, Mahi's love interest, Mounika, Balakrishna's girlfriend, Bubby, and Durga's father, they begin a tent house business and succeed. But life throws unexpected challenges at them. The story ends with these three friends defying death and becoming famous.

== Cast ==
- Sumanth Prabhas as Mahesh "Mai" Reddy
- Mani Aegurla as Durga
- Mourya Nalagatla Chowdary as Balakrishna "Baali"
- Saarya Laxman as Mounika Reddy, Mai's cousin
- Kiran Macha as Jinka Venu
- Anji Mama Milkuri as Anji
- Muralidhar Goud as Sarpanch Yella Reddy, Mai's uncle and Mounika's father
- Siri Raasi as Babitha "Babbi", Baali's love interest
- Shiva Nandhan as "Lipstick Spoiler" Lingam
- Narendra Ravi as Bhaskar "Baashi" Yadav, Mai, Baali, and Durga's friend

== Soundtrack ==
Mem Famous

Soundtrack album by Kalyan Nayak
- Released: 2023
- Recorded: 2023
- Genre: Feature film soundtrack
- Length: 18:05
- Language: Telugu
- Label: Lahari Music

The film score and soundtrack album of the film is composed by Kalyan Nayak.

No.	Title	Lyrics	Music	Singer(s)	Length
1.	"Ayyayyo"	Kalyan Nayak & Saarya Laxman	Kalyan Nayak	Rahul Sipligunj	3:41
2.	"Dosthulam"	Koti Mamidala & Kalyan Nayak	Kalyan Nayak	Kaala Bhairava	4:10
3.	"Dhinkachika"	Koti Mamidala & Kalyan Nayak	Kalyan Nayak	Kalyan Nayak	2:46
4.	"Galli Chinnadi"	Goreti Venkanna	Kalyan Nayak	Goreti Venkanna	4:27
5.	"Minimum Song"	Koti Mamidala & Kalyan Nayak	Kalyan Nayak	Rahul Sipligunj	3:01
Total length:					18:05

== Reception ==
=== Critical response ===
Mem Famous received mixed reviews from critics. The Times of India gave the film 2.5 out of 5 stars and wrote that it is "a feel-good film with a positive message", praising the performances while noting shortcomings in the screenplay.

== Accolades ==
Award (Note: Awards, festivals and organizations are in alphabetical order.)	Date of ceremony (Note: Date is linked to the article about the awards held that year, wherever possible.)	Category	Recipient(s)	Result	Ref.
South Indian International Movie Awards	14 September 2024	Emerging New Comer	Sumanth Prabhas	Won	
South Indian International Movie Awards	14 September 2024	Best Debutant Actor – Telugu	Sumanth Prabhas	Nominated	
South Indian International Movie Awards	14 September 2024	Best Debutant Director – Telugu	Sumanth Prabhas	Nominated	
South Indian International Movie Awards	14 September 2024	Best Playback Singer – Male	Rahul Sipligunj for "Ayyayyo"	Nominated	
IIFA Utsavam	27 September 2024	Best Playback Singer – Male	Rahul Sipligunj for "Ayyayyo"	Won	
