= Sumanth Prabhas =

Indian actor and filmmaker

- Born: Sumanth Reddy; Hyderabad, Telangana, India
- Occupation: Actor
- Years active: 2023–present

Sumanth Prabhas is an Indian actor, screenwriter and director who works in Telugu cinema. He made his debut in 2023 with Mem Famous, which he also wrote and directed.

He has since appeared in films such as Godari Gattupaina (2026) and Romanchakam (2026).

== Early life ==
Sumanth Prabhas was born in Hyderabad, Telangana.

== Career ==
Sumanth Prabhas made his debut with the 2023 film Mem Famous, which he also wrote and directed.

In 2026, he appeared in Godari Gattupaina and Romanchakam, both of which opened to mixed reviews.

== Filmography ==
Year	Film	Role	Notes	Ref.
2023	Mem Famous	Mahesh "Mai" Reddy	Debut Film	
2026	Godari Gattupaina	Raju		
2026	Romanchakam	Anvesh		
