= Key (film) =

- Movie Poster
- Directed by: Nagendra Prasad
- Screenplay by: Nagendra Prasad; Anil Guduru
- Story by: Nagendra Prasad
- Based on: Exam (2009)
- Produced by: Sukumar Reddy
- Starring: Jagapati Babu
- Cinematography: P. G. Vinda
- Edited by: Nandamuri Taraka Rama Rao
- Music by: Vijay Kurakula
- Production company: Dream Theater Entertainments
- Release date: 16 July 2011
- Running time: 84 minutes
- Country: India
- Language: Telugu

Key is a 2011 Telugu-language psychological thriller produced by Sukumar Reddy for Dream Theater Entertainments and directed by Nagendra Prasad. Jagapati Babu plays the lead role and the music was composed by Vijay Kurakula. The film is a remake of the English film Exam.

== Plot ==
The film begins with a special examination in a closed room with security for a notable post in a Prestigious Company. Here, nine candidates appear, and the Invigilator narrates that they select the one who answers based on the question within 90 minutes. They are appealing four conditions that disqualify them from crossing the bridge.

1. The applicants should not talk with the Invigilator

2. Cannot talk with Security

3. Do not leave the room

4. They may not spoil their paper either intentionally or accidentally.

The Invigilator moves by locking the room, and the test begins. Then, the contenders are surprised to spot a blank paper minus the question. At the outset, a candidate is ineligible as he spoiled the paper by writing God's name. At that point, the men are in bewilderment. Hence, they communicate without damaging the rules and decide to figure out the question through teamwork. They introduce themselves and describe their profession to eliminate any caste, community, numerology, or color sentiments.

1. Criminal Lawyer

2. Professor

3. Psychologist

4. Optic Engineer

5. Scientist

6. MBA Graduate

7. Business Consultant

8. Journalist

Next, the team starts breaking out the Key with their subject analysis and expertise, utilizing various methods such as lights, bodily fluids, fire sprinklers, glass pieces, etc. Meanwhile, it eliminates the optic engineer as he tears the paper. Plus, the Criminal Lawyer backstabs the MBA graduate and the Business consultant, which removes them under his assumption that whoever is left, in the end, is the winner. In response, the Journalist strikes the Lawyer when he collapses and fastens. Afterward, the Lawyer pleads for his medication, which he has to take hourly; otherwise, he goes into a coma. But the ruthless Journalist disposes of it.

Currently, he targets the Psychologist as he discovers she is a previous employee of the firm and tortures her for the question. Time goes on, and the Lawyer's condition worsens in that precariousness, so the Psychologist erases this by speaking with the Invigilator. Anyhow, the Professor stands strong & firm in every plight and, recoups the medicine, and rescues the Lawyer with her wit. However, the sly Lawyer ruses by stealing the guard's revolver and gives the last warning to vacate the room. Since they deny he shoots the Journalist when the Scientist walks out and the Professor pretends. In the joy of the championship, the Lawyer addresses the Invigilator, and the guard kicks him out. As it happens, the Journalist also recovers because it is a dummy bullet. Ultimately, the Invigilator arrives and congratulates the Professor. Finally, the Invigilator states that he doesn't ask any questions. They just piloted their traits, abilities, and crisis management skills. Finally, the movie ends with the Invigilator, the CEO, appointing the Professor.

== Cast ==
- Jagapati Babu as Invigilator
- Swapna as Candidate 9
- Sampath
- Sukumar as Moyee
- Deepthi Vajpayee
- Altaf Meerza
- Dhanunjay
- Sonia
- Williams as Maleek
- Chinna Rajju
- Narasimha
- Raj as Kiran
