= Nagaram Nidrapotunna Vela =

- Theatrical release poster
- Directed by: Prem Raj
- Written by: Prem Raj
- Produced by: Nandi Srihari
- Starring: Jagapathi Babu; Charmee Kaur
- Cinematography: Lakshmi Narasimhan
- Edited by: Marthand K. Venkatesh
- Music by: Yasho Krishna
- Production company: Gurudeva Creations Pvt.Ltd
- Release date: 24 June 2011
- Running time: 133 minutes
- Country: India
- Language: Telugu

Nagaram Nidrapotunna Vela (transl. When The City Sleeps) is a 2011 Telugu-language philosophical film, produced by Nandi Srihari on Gurudeva Creations Pvt. Ltd. banner and directed by Prem Raj. It stars Jagapati Babu, Charmee Kaur and music composed by Yasho Krishna. The film received negative reviews.

== Plot ==
The film begins in a forest where a college team moves on an excursion. Shockingly, they detect a pen drive with traces of blood around that spot. Consequently, they open it, which shows the lifestyle of a journalist, Niharika, who works for Channel 4. So, the students feel something fishy and inquire after coming back. Firstly, they meet Niharika's friend Supraja in the channel, who divulges the actuality.

Niharika is a sincere journalist who always fights for social welfare. Anyhow, the channel MD Prasada Rao always hinders and chides her programs. Hence, she ventures out alone in the night for controversial news. Ahead before, the channel plans an interview with Minister Janardhan Rao. After that, he involuntarily proclaims his secret talk to his colleagues in the visitors' room to become Chief Minister by collapsing the government. Fortunately, Niharika's pen camera records it, to which she is unbeknownst. Now, the Minister intrigues and assigns the task of eliminating Niharika to his men.

Meanwhile, Niharika proceeds as per her operation, wandering the streets and ignoring societal inequities, irregularities, and evils. En route, a jokester, an alcoholic stranger, Sivarama Prasad, acquaints her, whom society deprived. He rescued her from various dangers late last night. On that momentary travel, the two become friends and like each other.

Besides, the Minister sets out his subterfuge by accumulating MLAs'. Over there, his men attack Niharika for the camera when Sivarama Prasad saves and smells the matter rotten. Thus, the pair views the video and realizes the machinate of Minister Janardhan Rao. Immediately, Niharika hands over the proof to her MD, but the sly auctions it before the Minister. Knowing it, Niharika questions, and Sivarama Prasad retorts at him and quits the place. On their way back, the heels seek to slay them when Sivarama Prasad sacrifices his life while guarding Niharika. Before leaving his breath, he confesses his love and takes an oath from her to awaken social conscience among the public.

Later, Niharika's colleague Shivaji provides her with a copy after soul-searching. She directly passes it to the Chief Minister, who also backstabs by conspiring with the Minister. Moreover, the police lay hold of Niharika, haul her to the forest, and encounter her. Simultaneously, the evil forces prevail, and high religious riots leave severe destruction. Apart from this, the students find the whereabouts of Niharika, who tribes have rescued. At last, Niharika unites the people and conducts a social revolt when the public ceases the wicked politicians. Finally, the movie ends with Niharika moving on her path to a new mission.

== Cast ==
- Jagapati Babu as Sivarama Prasad
- Charmee Kaur as Niharika
- Pilla Prasad as Minister Janardhan Rao
- Giri Babu as Balarama Krishnaiah
- Chandra Mohan as MLA Kishtaiah
- Paruchuri Gopala Krishna as Niharika's father
- Siva Reddy as Journalist Shivaji
- Prudhvi Raj as Inspector
- Satya Prakash as Police
- Babu Mohan as MLA
- Ahuti Prasad as Channel-4 MD Prasada Rao
- Vizag Prasad as Party President
- Uttej as Minister's brother-in-law
- Goreti Venkanna as Venkanna
- Gundu Hanumantha Rao as Priest
- Gundu Sudarshan as Lecturer
- Ananth as Priest
- Sarika Ramachandra Rao
- Laxman Meesala
- Supraja as Journalist Supraja
- Sandhya Janak as Niharika's mother

== Soundtrack ==
Nagaram Nidrapotunna Vela

Film score by Yasho Krishna
- Released: 2011
- Genre: Soundtrack
- Length: 31:58
- Label: Aditya Music
- Producer: Yasho Krishna

Music was composed by Yasho Krishna and released by ADITYA Music Company.

No.	Title	Lyrics	Singer(s)	Length
1.	"Nataraju Pooja"	Suddala Ashok Teja	Shankar Mahadevan	4:42
2.	"Nidra Pothunnadi"	Suddala Ashok Teja	S. P. Balasubrahmanyam	5:50
3.	"Samara Simha"	Goreti Venkanna	Goreti Venkanna	5:50
4.	"Ekkadi Dakka"	Ananta Sriram	Hariharan, Harini	5:45
5.	"Ma Mummy"	Bhaskarbhatla	Ranjith, Suchitra	5:06
6.	"Aksharaniki"	Suddala Ashok Teja	Vandemataram Srinivas	4:31
Total length:				31:58
