= Godari Gattupaina =

2026 Telugu-language film

- Directed by: Subash Chandra
- Written by: Subash Chandra; Sairam Ijju; Anurag Kautoori; Rohit Krishna Varma
- Produced by: Red Puppet Movies; Asian Cinemas
- Starring: Sumanth Prabhas; Nidhi Pradeep; Jagapathi Babu; Laila; Sudharshan
- Cinematography: Saai Santosh
- Edited by: Anil Pasala
- Production company: Saregama
- Distributed by: Amazon Prime Video
- Release date: 8 May 2026
- Running time: 148.31 minutes
- Country: India
- Language: Telugu

Godari Gatuupaina is a 2026 Indian Telugu-language romantic comedy film directed by Subash Chandra and produced by Red Puppet Movies. It stars Sumanth Prabhas, Nidhi Pradeep, Jagapathi Babu and Laila in the lead roles. The film was released on 8 May 2026 in Theatres and on 30 May 2026 in Amazon Prime Video.

== Plot ==
In the picturesque Godavari villages, a kind-hearted auto driver and a spirited college girl fall in love, but their bond is tested by her father's expectations.

== Cast ==
- Sumanth Prabhas as Raju
- Nidhi Pradeep as Maaya
  - Krithi Nandhana as Baby Maaya
- Jagapathi Babu as Sambabu, Maaya's father
- Laila as Jhansi, Maaya's mother
- Sudharshan as Rehman, Raju's Friend
- Rajeev Kanakala as Prakash, Sambabu's friend
- Harshavardhan as Velpuri SI
- Rajkumar Kasireddy as Robert
- Reenu SK as Mahalakshmi
- 'Viva' Raghav as Ramu
- Sri Lasya Bhallamudi as Samaikya
- Nishant Singh as Laxman
- Aatma Prakash Mishra as Atmaram
- Prashanth Singh as Ramnath Dhami

== Filming ==
Directed by Subhash Chandra, the film is set in the rural backdrop of the Godavari region. Sumanth Prabhas said that he has undergone special training to act in the Godavari accent in the film. The major portions were shot in Bhimavaram, Relangi. The film is produced by Abhinav Rao under the banner of Red Puppet Productions.

== Music ==
Naga Vamshi was signed to compose the soundtrack album and background score for 'Godari Gattupoina'. The soundtrack features seven songs. The lyrics were penned by Dinesh Kakarla.

Godari Gattupoina

Soundtrack album by Naga Vamshi
- Released: 5 May 2026
- Recorded: The Sound Dock & Aditya Everest Studios
- Genre: Feature film soundtrack
- Length: 31:21
- Language: Telugu
- Label: Saregama
- Producer: Naga Vamshi

Track list
No.	Title	Lyrics	Singer(s)	Length
1.	"Choodu Choodu (Side A)"	Dinesh Kakkerla	Haricharan	02:52
2.	"Choodu Choodu (Side B)"	Dinesh Kakkerla	Harini Ivvaturi	03:03
3.	"Oh My God"	Vengi Sudhakar	Gana Bala	03:36
4.	"Bangaru Bomma"	Balaji	K.S. Chitra, S. P. Charan	05:34
5.	"Nenu Na Palleturu"	Ramajogayya Sastry	M.L.R. Karthikeyan	05:16
6.	"Ee Chinni Kadhalo"	Dinesh Kakkerla	Kala Bhairava	04:42
7.	"Inthakanna"	Ramajogayya Sastry	Aruna Mary George,Kalyan Vasanth	06:18

== Release ==
The film was released on 8 May 2026 in Theatres and on 30 May 2026 in Amazon Prime Video.

== Reception ==
Divya Shree of The Times of India said that "The film works as a breezy and fairly engaging rural romantic drama that banks more on simplicity, emotions, and village charm than novelty. Despite its predictable storyline and a few uneven moments, it manages to offer a pleasant one-time watch for audiences who enjoy feel-good relationship dramas rooted in family emotions. Suresh Kavirayani of the Cinema Express said that "Godari Gattupaina aims to be a breezy romantic entertainer but ends up feeling preachy and outdated. While a few moments and comedy scenes work, the film doesn't fully meet expectations."
