= Adavilo Abhimanyudu =

- Theatrical release poster
- Directed by: S. Anil Kumar
- Written by: Satyanand (dialogues)
- Story by: Ashok
- Based on: Douthyam (1989)
- Produced by: S. Venkataratnam
- Starring: Jagapathi Babu; Vinod Kumar Alva; Aishwarya
- Cinematography: Jayanan Vincent
- Edited by: K. Narayanan
- Music by: K. V. Mahadevan
- Production company: Pallavi Purna Pictures
- Release date: 8 December 1989
- Running time: 112 minutes
- Country: India
- Language: Telugu

Adavilo Abhimanyudu (transl. Abhimanyu in a Forest) is a 1989 Telugu-language adventure-thriller film, produced by S. Venkataratnam and directed by S. Anil Kumar. It stars Jagapathi Babu, Vinod Kumar Alva and Aishwarya (in her acting debut), with music composed by K. V. Mahadevan. The film is a remake of the 1989 Malayalam film Douthyam. The film won two Nandi Awards.

== Plot ==
Adavilo Abhimanyudu follows the story of Captain Abhimanyu, a brave and skilled army officer, who is assigned a dangerous mission deep in the forest. A military aircraft carrying top-secret documents and a fellow officer, Captain Suresh, has gone missing. With time running out and national security at risk, Abhimanyu is chosen to recover the documents and, if possible, rescue his comrade.

Venturing alone into the dense, unfamiliar jungle, Abhimanyu faces a series of life-threatening challenges,from harsh terrain and wild animals to deadly enemy forces also hunting for the same documents. As he pushes forward, his mission becomes more than just a duty; it's a personal test of endurance & loyalty.

Struggling against the odds, Abhimanyu's journey becomes a gripping fight for survival. His strength, intelligence, and emotional resilience are put to the ultimate test as he races to complete the mission and make it back alive.

== Cast ==
- Jagapathi Babu as Captain Abhimanyu
- Vinod Kumar Alva as Captain Suresh
- Aishwarya as Shanti
- Ranganath as Col. Raghuram
- Gummadi as Major
- Babu Antony as Max
- Sanjeevi as Captain Raju
- KK Sarma as Boxing Refery
- Kuali as item number
- Priyanka as Leela
- Kalpana Rai as Kalpana

== Soundtrack ==
Adavilo Abhimanyudu

Film score by K. V. Mahadevan
- Released: 1989
- Genre: Soundtrack
- Length: 12:36
- Label: AVM Audio
- Producer: K. V. Mahadevan

K. V. Mahadevan chronology
Atta Mechina Alludu (1989)	Adavilo Abhimanyudu (1989)	Sutradharulu (1989)

The movie's music was composed by K. V. Mahadevan, and the lyrics were written by Acharya Aatreya. The soundtrack was released by AVM Audio Company.

S. No	Song title	Singers	length
1	"Pachahani Pachhika"	S. P. Balasubrahmanyam, Chitra	4:08
2	"Puttameedha Palapitta"	S. P. Balasubrahmanyam, Chitra	4:13
3	"Dammu Okati Kotteyara"	Chitra	4:15

== Awards ==
Nandi Awards

- Special Jury Award - Jagapati Babu (1989)
- Best Screenplay Writer - Satyanand
