= Kavumbhagom =

- Interactive map of Kavumbhagom
- Country: India
- State: Kerala
- District: Pathanamthitta

Population (2011)
  - Total: 6,644

Languages
  - Official: Malayalam, English
- Time zone: UTC+5:30 (IST)
- PIN: 689102
- Telephone code: 91469
- Vehicle registration: KL-27 THIRUVALLA
- Lok Sabha constituency: Pathanamthitta
- Vidhan Sabha constituency: THIRUVALLA
- Climate: tropical (Köppen)

Kavumbhagom, also spelled Kavumbhagam, is a ward and a revenue village in Thiruvalla municipality, in the Pathanamthitta district of Kerala, India. The village has a population of 6644 as of 2011. Kavumbhagom is an important junction serving as a major road route connecting Changanasserry, Thiruvalla, Chathenkary, and Mavelikkara. The Thiruvalla Sree Vallabha temple, after which the town of Thiruvalla has been named, is located in Kavumbhagom.

Traditionally, Kavumbhagom referred to the area around the Karunattu Kaavu temple, and was the junction where the Thiruvalla-Mavelikkara Road met the Kottayam-Mavelikkara Road. Once a new road was constructed from the Ambili Junction during the early 1980s, the former Kavumbhagom Junction came to be called Anchal Kutty, while the place formerly known as Erankavu became known as Kavumbhagom.

== History ==
Kavumbhagom was home to the Kāvil Market (no longer in existence) which was once one of the most famous markets of Kerala. This market was also popular among foreign trade links. Situated in the street commencing from Erankavu Temple to the Kaavil Temple in present-day Kavumbhagom, the houses in this street are still called "Kāvile Vīdukaḷ" (Malayalam for in a Kavu) and the houses in the Pushpagiri-Tholassery area are known as "Malayile Vīdukaḷ" (Malayalam for on a hill)), because it was situated on an elevated area when compared to the Kāvile Vīdukaḷ. Kavumbhagom was also the first settlement area of the early Christians of Thiruvalla. Quotes about this famous street and its people are mentioned in the renowned poem "Unnuneeli Sandesham". Kavumbhagom was the main centre of Thiruvalla upto the 19th Century.

The first school in Thiruvalla was established in the mid-19th century in the Kāvil Market on the road to Pallippalam.

== Demographics ==
As of the 2011 Indian census, Kavumbhagom has a population of 6,644, of which 47.75% are male and 52.25% are female. 8.06% of the population is under 6 years of age. Scheduled Castes and Scheduled Tribes constitute 17.47% and 0.07% of the population respectively. The total literacy rate is 97.2% (98.01% for males and 96.47% for females) which is higher than the state average of 94% and the national average of 74.04%.

== Facilities ==
- Hospitals: G.K. Hospital
- Schools: Devaswom Board Hindu Higher Secondary School, Kunnumpuram L.P. School
- Auditoriums: Kattappuram St. George Auditorium, Fr. Euachim Memorial Auditorium, Erankavu Temple Auditorium, Ebenezer Auditorium
- Theatre: New Jacobs Cinema

== Places of worship ==
Kavumbhagom, like the rest of Thiruvalla, is rich in the cultures of both Hinduism and Christianity.

The important temples are Karunattukavu Devi Temple, Sree Krishnaswamy Tamil Temple, Thiru Erankavu Bhagavathi Temple, Shri Anandeshwaram Shiva Temple, Kurichi Devi Temple, Nedumpallil Devi Temple, and the Plappallikkulangara Mahavishnu Temple.

The important churches are Kattappuram St. George Orthodox Church, St. George Syrian Jacobite Church, St. Mulk Orthodox Church, Ebenezer Marthoma Church, India Pentecostal Church of God, and the Bethel Assemblies of God Church.

== Transport ==
Kavumbhagom is a busy junction in the Thiruvalla-Kayankulam, Thiruvalla-Ambalappuzha as well as Idinjillam-Kavumbhagom route.

This junction is situated to the west of SCS Junction, the heart of Thiruvalla. The diversion, if coming through MC Road, is to be taken at the Cross Junction towards the Market Road. Kavumbhagom is in this route, which is also the route to the western side (such as Ambalappuzha or Kayankulam). The junctions en route are :Taluk Court Junction, Govt. Hospital Junction, Ramapuram Market Junction, and Ambili Junction. It is almost three km (1.9 mi) away from the SCS Junction.

The Railway Station is three km (1.9 mi) from Kavumbhagom.

Kavumbhagom is well-accessible by a fleet of KSRTC buses as well as private buses.

The nearest airport is the Cochin International Airport which is 111 km (69 mi) away from Kavumbhagom.
