= Pedababu =

- Movie Poster
- Directed by: Paruchuri Murali
- Written by: Ramesh-Gopi (dialogues)
- Screenplay by: Paruchuri Murali
- Story by: Seeman
- Produced by: M. L. Kumar Chowdary
- Starring: Jagapathi Babu; Kalyani
- Cinematography: S.K.A. Bhupathi
- Edited by: Marthand K. Venkatesh
- Music by: Chakri
- Production company: Sri Keerthi Creations
- Release date: 30 April 2004
- Running time: 145 minutes
- Country: India
- Language: Telugu

Pedababu is a 2004 Indian Telugu-language action drama film, produced by M.L. Kumar Chowdary on Sri Keerthi Creations banner and directed by Paruchuri Murali. Starring Jagapathi Babu, Kalyani and music composed by Chakri. Sunil received Filmfare Award for Best Comedian – Telugu for this film. This movie is a remake of Pasumpon.

== Plot ==
The film begins in a village where Pedababu is an arbiter esteemed as a deity. However, he lives in solitude, far from his mother, Parvati. Do not agree to talk with her as she has performed a re-marriage with Gangadharam, but be polite towards them. The couple has two sons and a daughter, Geeta. Once, a venomous Rudraraju belonging to an adjacent village tries to molest a girl when an inflamed Pedababu chops his hand. So, he mingles with his sly brother-in-law Kanakaraju and is vindictive toward Pedababu. They avail of the half-sibling begrudge on his prosperity and make a point of affronting him. Besides, Neelavani, a cousin of Pedababu, intensely adores him, and he also quietly dear her.

Meanwhile, Geeta loves Bhaskar, the grandson of Pedababu's scribe Raghavaiah, whom he gives utmost respect to. Kanakaraju divulges it to her brothers, who clout Bhaskar when Pedababu comes to get word to unite the pair. At that point, the step-brothers question, who is he to do? When Parvati asserts him as her elder son, he refuses, and she collapses. As a result, everyone accuses Pedababu of his deed. Then, he is overwhelmed with grief and moves rearward.

Twenty-five years ago, Sivaramaiah, his grandfather, had morality and forefront held the same reverence as Pedababu. He knitted Parvati with a wise guy, and they are blessed with Pedababu. Soon after, Pedababu's father passes away, which distraught Sivaramaiah and his health deteriorates. Gangadharam is his unimpeachable servant whom he requests to nuptial his daughter and forcibly makes Parvati agree. Next, Sivaramaiah arrays the horoscopes to an omnipotent saint who states that Pedababu ignites the death of his parents. Plus, the concrete outlet is to detach the mother and the kid. Overhearing it, Pedababu ascertains his mother's safety as vital and residing apart from her.

Concurrently, Chandu, son of an amoral MP, aspires to possess Geeta. Accordingly, they move with offers of espousal through Kanakaraju, and rapacious brothers take the plea. Here, Pedababu warns the MP and vows to unite the two birds by wiping off anyone who stands in the way. Hence, he wiles to slaughter Pedababu at the temple, given that he stands still until prayer ends when nature shields him from the evils. Thus, MP & his men hustle back, viewing the furious form of Pedababu. Being conscious of it, Rudraraju violently attempts to wedlock Geeta, backstabbing her brothers and smacking the parents. Spotting it, Pedababu flares up, protects his family, and ceases the black guards. Therein, the brothers reform and seek to pardon Pedababu. Parvati pleads with him to endorse her as his mother, but he still keeps silent. Due to that crash, Parvati becomes terminally ill. At last, Pedababu bows his head before God reaches and calls Parvati as a mother, which makes her recoup. Finally, the movie ends on a happy note with the familfamily'sion.

== Cast ==
- Jagapati Babu as Pedababu
- Kalyani as Neelaveni
- K Viswanath as Sivaramaiah
- Suhasini as Parvathi
- Kota Srinivasa Rao as Kanaka Raju
- Sunil as Bapineedu
- Sarath Babu as Gangadharam
- Vijayachander as Saint
- Ponnambalam as Rudra Raju
- Ajay as Pedababu's younger brother
- Bharath Raju as Pedababu's younger brother
- Prabhu
- Rallapalli as Raghavaiah
- Devadas Kanakala as Registrar
- Vizag Prasad as M.P.
- Chittajalu Lakshmipati as Barber Sattibabu
- Fish Venkat as Kanaka Raju's henchman
- Jenny as Teacher
- Harika as Geeta
- Shobha
- Sakhi
- Uma
- Master Deepak Saroj as Young Pedababu

== Soundtrack ==
Pedababu

Film score by Chakri
- Released: 2004
- Genre: Soundtrack
- Length: 23:59
- Label: SOHAN Audio
- Producer: Chakri

Chakri chronology
143 (2004)	Pedababu (2004)	Andhrawala (2004)

Music composed by Chakri. Music released on SOHAN Audio Company.

No.	Title	Lyrics	Singer(s)	Length
1.	"Oka Vekuva"	Jaladi	S. P. Balasubrahmanyam	5:12
2.	"Bava Bava"	Jaladi	Ravi Varma, Sunitha Balaji	4:24
3.	"Navvavayya Babu"	Bhaskarabhatla Ravikumar	Chakri, Kousalya	4:43
4.	"Naalo Nuvvundali"	Bhaskarabhatla Ravikumar	S. P. Balasubrahmanyam, Kousalya	4:18
5.	"Oka Devudu"	Jaladi	S. P. Balasubrahmanyam	0:52
6.	"Palluna Virigindiro"	Jaladi	Sandeep Bhaumik, Kousalya	4:16
Total length:				23:59

== Awards ==
Award	Category	Recipients and nominees	Outcome
Filmfare Awards	Filmfare Award for Best Comedian – Telugu	Sunil	Won
