= Peddarikam =

- Theatrical release poster
- Directed by: A. M. Rathnam
- Written by: Paruchuri Brothers
- Screenplay by: A. M. Rathnam
- Story by: Siddique-Lal
- Produced by: A. M. Rathnam
- Starring: Jagapathi Babu; Sukanya; N. N. Pillai; Bhanumathi
- Cinematography: S. Gopal Reddy
- Edited by: Gautham Raju
- Music by: Raj–Koti
- Production company: Sri Surya Movies
- Release date: 1992
- Running time: 134 minutes
- Country: India
- Language: Telugu

Peddarikam (transl. Eldership or seniority) is a 1992 Indian Telugu-language drama film, produced and directed by A. M. Rathnam under the Sri Surya Movies banner. It is a remake of the Malayalam film Godfather. The film is starred by Jagapathi Babu, Sukanya (in her Telugu Debut), N. N. Pillai (reprising his role from Godfather), and Bhanumathi with a soundtrack by Raj–Koti. The film was a super hit at the box-office and was Jagapathi Babu's first successful film.

== Cast ==
- Jagapati Babu as Krishna Mohan
- Sukanya as Janaki
- N. N. Pillai as Parvathaneni Parasuramayya
- Bhanumathi Ramakrishna as Adusumilli Basavapurnamma
- Chandra Mohan as Ramakrishna
- Vijayakumar as Balaramudu
- M. Balayya as Samba Sivudu
- Allu Ramalingaiah as Lawyer
- Sudhakar as Prasad
- Paruchuri Venkateswara Rao as Lawyer
- Narra Venkateswara Rao as Mallikarjunudu
- Chalapathi Rao as Chandra Shekarudu
- Rami Reddy as Narasimham
- Uday Prakash as Veerabhadram
- Kavitha as Lalitha
- Tatineni Rajeswari as Mallikarjunudu's wife
- Anitha as Warden
- Sadhana as Chandra Shekarudu's wife

Shivanandakumar as Vishnu mohan

== Soundtrack ==
Music composed by Raj–Koti. Music released on Lahari Music Company.

Track listing
| No. | Title | Lyrics | Singer(s) | Length |
|---|---|---|---|---|
| 1. | "Nee Navve Chaalu" | Bhuvanachandra | S.P. Balu, Chitra | 5:17 |
| 2. | "Priyathama Priyathama" | Bhuvanachandra | S. P. Balasubrahmanyam, Chitra | 4:47 |
| 3. | "Muddula Janaki Pelliki" | Vaddepalli Krishna | Chitra | 4:42 |
| 4. | "Idele Tharatharala Charitam" | Bhuvanachandra | K. J. Yesudas, Swarnalatha | 4:54 |
| Total length: | | | | 19:40 |

== Awards ==
Sudhakar won the Nandi Award for Best Male Comedian for his performance in this film.
