= Jagapathi Babu =

Indian actor (born 1962)

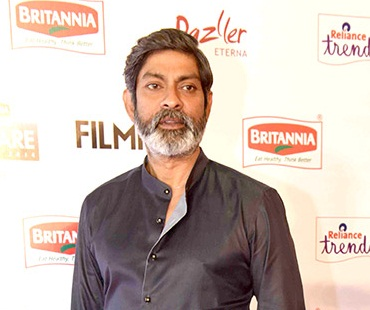
- Babu in 2015
- Born: Veeramachaneni Jagapathi Chowdary; 12 February 1962 (age 64); Vijayawada, Andhra Pradesh, India
- Occupation: Actor
- Years active: 1989—present
- Works: Full list
- Spouse: Lakshmi
- Children: 2
- Parent: V. B. Rajendra Prasad (father)

Veeramachaneni Jagapathi Chowdary (born 12 February 1962), professionally known as Jagapathi Babu, is an Indian actor known for his works in Telugu cinema. He has also appeared in Tamil, Kannada, Malayalam and Hindi films. Babu has appeared in 170 feature films, and has received four Filmfare Awards and seven state Nandi Awards.

He has worked with notable directors like Kodi Ramakrishna, S. V. Krishna Reddy, Ram Gopal Varma, Krishna Vamsi, E. V. V. Satyanarayana, Gunasekhar, Chandra Sekhar Yeleti, Siva, A. M. Rathnam, K. Raghavendra Rao, Radha Mohan, Mohan Raja, J. D. Chakravarthy, Boyapati Srinu, Trivikram Srinivas, Vysakh, K. S. Ravikumar, Sukumar, Koratala Siva and Prashanth Neel.

== Early life ==
Babu was born on 12 February 1962 in the Benz Circle area of Vijayawada, Andhra Pradesh to producer-director V. B. Rajendra Prasad. He was brought up in Chennai, Tamil Nadu before working in Telugu cinema. He married Lakshmi and has two daughters.

== Career ==
=== 1989–2013: Lead roles ===
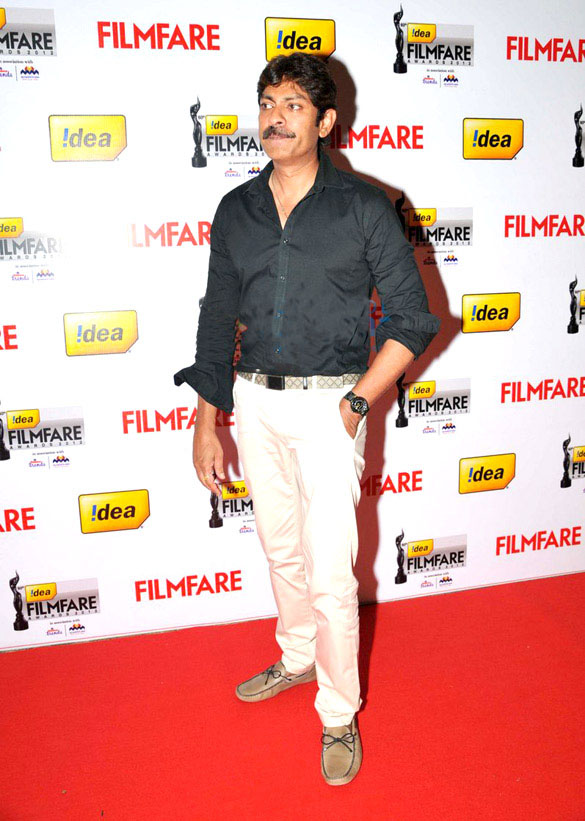
Babu at the 60th Filmfare Awards South in 2013

Babu made his lead debut in Telugu with the movie Simha Swapnam (1989) which was produced by his father and directed by V. Madhusudhana Rao. That same year, he starred in Adavilo Abhimanyudu. His first commercial success came with Peddarikam released in 1992. He had his breakthrough in the form of Gaayam directed by Ram Gopal Varma in the year 1993. In 1994, with the super hit film Subhalagnam, he reached family audience. He won the Nandi Award for Best Actor in 1996 for his role in the movie Maavichiguru directed by S V Krishna Reddy.

1997 saw hit films including Subhakankshalu and Pelli Pandiri. In 1998, he won the Nandi Award for Best Supporting Actor for the film Anthahpuram. In 2000, he won the Nandi Best Actor Award for his performance in the thriller Manoharam. In 2003, he starred in the multistarrer Hanuman Junction. In 2003–05, he did runway hit films like Kabaddi Kabaddi, Athade Oka Sainyam, Pedababu and Anukokunda Oka Roju. In 2006, he appeared in Samanyudu and Pellaina Kothalo. He received the Nandi Best Supporting Actor Award for the second time in the year 2007 for his role in the film Lakshyam in addition to a won Filmfare Award. In 2011, he received the Kala Bhushana Award for his contribution to cinema by TSR Lalitha Kala Parishat.

His first Tamil movie was Madrasi, and in 2012, he appeared as the antagonist in Tamil film Thaandavam. He played the lead role in Jai Bolo Telangana, which won five Nandi Awards. In 2012, he debuted in the Kannada film Bachchan as a cop.

=== 2014–present: Supporting roles ===
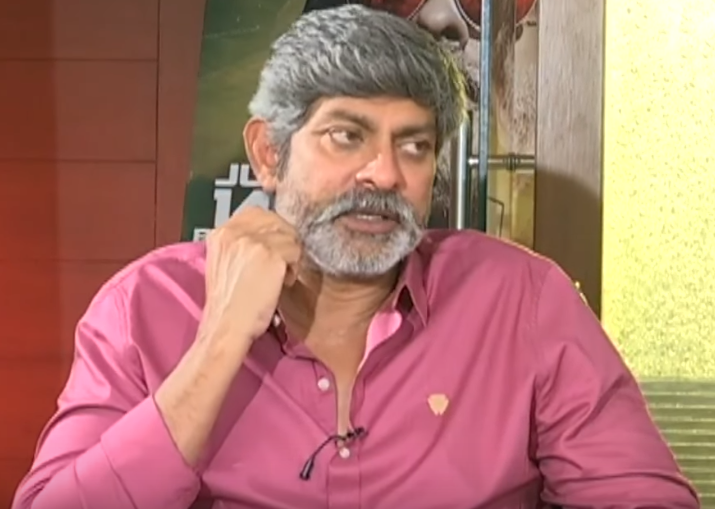
Babu promoting Patel S. I. R. in 2017

Since 2014, Babu decided to play antagonistic and supporting roles. He appeared in Nandamuri Balakrishna-starrer Legend (2014), where played an antagonist for the first time. His performance as Jitendra won many accolades. In the same year, he played a negative role opposite Rajinikanth in Lingaa. In 2015, he played Mahesh Babu's father in Srimanthudu. In 2016, Babu's role as a London-based billionaire in Sukumar-directed Nannaku Prematho, starring Jr NTR, was also appreciated. He played the antagonist in Ism and Jaguar. He also played opposite Mohanlal in Malayalam film, Pulimurugan. In 2017, he played Naga Chaitanya's father in Rarandoi Veduka Chudham.

In the 2018 film Rangasthalam, also directed by Sukumar, Babu played an oppressive president of the eponymous village. Grossing more than ₹2 billion, Rangasthalam was the highest grossing Telugu of that year. Alongside this, he played a Bangladeshi-terrorist in Goodachari, which became a sleeper hit. His antagonist role in the Trivikram Srinivas-directed film Aravinda Sametha Veera Raghava is termed as one of finest performances of his career. In 2019, his notable works were Maharshi along with a crucial role in Sye Raa Narasimha Reddy. In 2023, he played one of the villains in the Hindi film Kisi Ka Bhai Kisi Ki Jaan, starring Salman Khan and Venkatesh.

He also played the role of Rajamannar in the blockbuster film Salaar: Part 1 – Ceasefire directed by Prashanth Neel in 2023.

== Awards and nominations ==
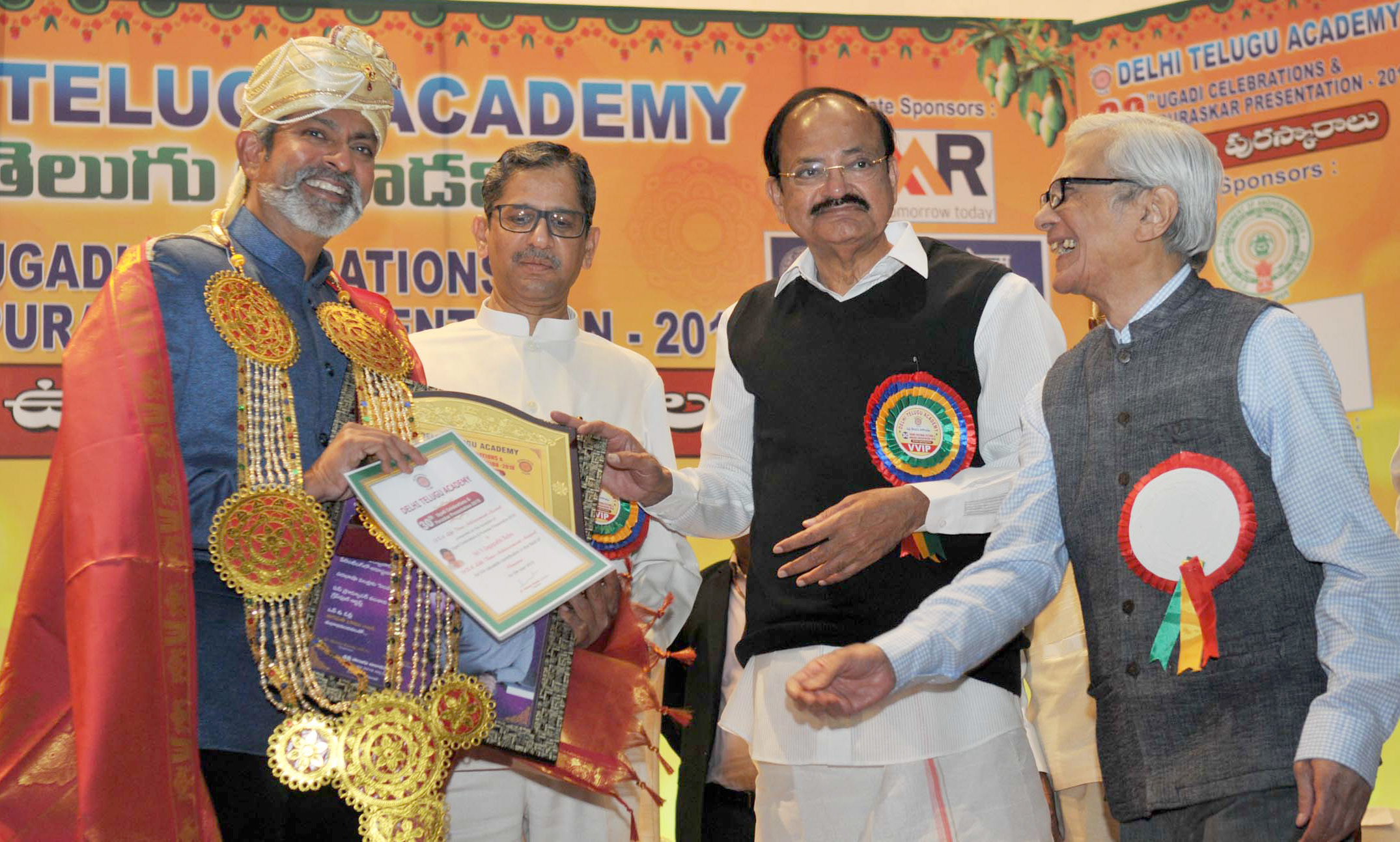
Babu receiving Lifetime Achievement Award from Venkaiah Naidu in 2018

=== Filmfare Awards ===
| Year | Category | Film | Result | Ref. |
|---|---|---|---|---|
| 1993 | Best Actor – Telugu | Gaayam | Nominated | |
| 1994 | Best Actor – Telugu | Subhalagnam | Nominated | |
| 1996 | Best Actor – Telugu | Maavichiguru | Nominated | |
| 1997 | Best Actor – Telugu | Chilakkottudu | Nominated | |
| 2005 | Best Supporting Actor – Telugu | Anukokunda Oka Roju | Nominated | |
| 2007 | Best Supporting Actor – Telugu | Lakshyam | Won | |
| 2008 | Best Supporting Actor – Telugu | Kathanayakudu | Nominated | |
| 2011 | Best Supporting Actor – Telugu | Jai Bolo Telangana | Nominated | |
| 2014 | Best Supporting Actor – Telugu | Legend | Won | |
| 2015 | Best Supporting Actor – Telugu | Srimanthudu | Nominated | |
| 2016 | Best Supporting Actor – Telugu | Nannaku Prematho | Won | |
| 2018 | Best Supporting Actor – Telugu | Aravinda Sametha Veera Raghava | Won | |

=== Nandi Awards ===
| Year | Category | Film | Result | Ref. |
|---|---|---|---|---|
| 1989 | Special Jury Award | Adavilo Abhimanyudu | Won | |
| 1993 | Best Actor | Gaayam | Won | |
| 1996 | Best Actor | Maavichiguru | Won | |
| 1998 | Best Supporting Actor | Anthahpuram | Won | |
| 2000 | Best Actor | Manoharam | Won | |
| 2007 | Best Supporting Actor | Lakshyam | Won | |
| 2014 | Best Villain | Legend | Won | |

=== SIIMA Awards ===
| Year | Category | Film | Result | Ref. |
|---|---|---|---|---|
| 2014 | Best Actor in a Negative Role (Telugu) | Legend | Won | |
| 2016 | Best Actor in a Negative Role (Telugu) | Nannaku Prematho | Won | |
| 2019 | Best Actor in a Negative Role (Telugu) | Rangasthalam | Nominated | |
| 2021 | Best Actor in a Negative Role (Telugu) | Maharshi | Nominated | |
| 2016 | Special Jury Award | Pulimurugan | Won | |
| 2016 | Best Actor in a Negative Role (Malayalam) | Pulimurugan | Nominated | |
| 2021 | Best Actor in a Negative Role (Tamil) | Viswasam | Nominated | |

=== IIFA Utsavam ===
| Year | Category | Film | Result | Ref. |
|---|---|---|---|---|
| 2016 | Best Supporting Actor | Srimanthudu | Won | |
| 2017 | Best Actor in a Negative Role | Nannaku Prematho | Won | |

=== Asianet Film Awards ===
| Year | Category | Film | Result | Ref. |
|---|---|---|---|---|
| 2017 | Best Actor in a Negative Role | Pulimurugan | Won | |
