= List of Telugu films of 2001 =

This is a list of films produced by the Telugu language film industry based in Hyderabad in the year 2001.

== Box office collection ==
The highest-grossing Tollywood films released in 2001, by worldwide box office gross revenue, are as follows:

Highest worldwide gross of 2001
Rank	Title	Production company	Worldwide gross	Ref
1	Kushi	Sri Surya Movies	₹23.4 crore distributors' share(initial run) ₹7.46 crore(rerelease)	
2	Narasimha Naidu	Venkata Ramana Productions	₹25 crore distributors' share	
3	Nuvvu Naaku Nachav	Sri Sravanthi Movies	₹18 crore distributors' share	
4	Manasantha Nuvve	Sumanth Art Productions	₹18 crore distributors' share	
5	Nuvvu Nenu	Anandi Art Creations	₹16 crore distributors' share	
6	Daddy	Geetha Arts	₹16 crore distributors' share	
7	Murari	Ram Prasad Arts	₹13 crore distributors' share	
8	Student No. 1	Swapna Cinema	₹12 crore distributors' share	
9	Anandam	Ushakiran Movies	₹10 crore distributors' share	
10	Preminchu	Suresh Productions	₹8 crore distributors' share	

== January–June ==
Opening		Title	Director	Cast	Production house	Ref
J A N	11	Mrugaraju	Gunasekhar	Chiranjeevi, Simran, Nagendra Babu		
J A N	11	Narasimha Naidu	B. Gopal	Nandamuri Balakrishna, Simran, K. Vishwanath		
J A N	15	Devi Putrudu	Kodi Ramakrishna	Venkatesh, Soundarya, Anjala Zaveri		
J A N	18	Sivudu	Gosangi Krishna Rao	Suresh, Satyaprakash, Sudhakar, M. S. Narayana		
F E B	3	Navvuthu Bathakalira	Kodi Ramakrishna	J. D. Chakravarthy, Sangeeta		
F E B	9	Soori	Sankara Kumar	J. D. Chakravarthy, Priyanka Upendra, Tanikella Bharani		
F E B	9	Malli Inkoka Sari	Sahadev Reddy	Sri Madhav, Sahana, Snehita		
F E B	11	Priyamaina Neeku	Balasekaran	Tarun Kumar, Sneha		
F E B	14	Ammo Bomma	Relangi Narasimha Rao	Rajendra Prasad, Suman		
F E B	17	Murari	Krishna Vamsi	Mahesh Babu, Sonali Bendre		
F E B	27	Maa Ayana Sundarayya	Hari Babu	Srihari, Sangeeta, Kota Srinivasa Rao		
F E B	28	Sorry Aunty	Natti Kumar	Uttej, Gundu Hanumantha Rao, Tirupathi Prakash		
M A R	1	Madhura Kshanam	Aalla Rambabu	Chalapathi, Aarti Chhabria		
M A R	2	Pillalu Techina Annala Rajyam	C. H. M. Krishna	Prasad Babu, Ravindra, Narasimha Raju		
M A R	9	Budget Padmanabham	S. V. Krishna Reddy	Jagapati Babu, Ravi Teja, Ramya Krishnan		
M A R	9	Cheppukondi Chuddam	K Ranga Rao	Suman, M. S. Narayana, Tirupathi Prakash		
M A R	23	Deevinchandi	Muthyala Subbaiah	Srikanth, Raasi, Malavika		
M A R	30	Railway Coolie	Kodi Ramakrishna	Mammootty, Meena, Harish		
M A R	30	Eduruleni Manishi	Srinivasa Rao	Nagarjuna, Soundarya, Shenaz Treasurywala		
A P R	11	Preminchu	Boyani Subbarao	Sai Kiran, Laya		
A P R	12	Akka Bavekkada	Raja Vannem Reddy	J. D. Chakravarthy, Raasi		
A P R	12	Orey Thammudu	Sai Balaji	Srihari, Sanghavi		
A P R	15	Raave Naa Cheliya	P Kishore Kumar	Sai Kiran, AVS, Prudhviraj		
A P R	27	Kushi	S. J. Suryah	Pawan Kalyan, Bhoomika Chawla, Mumtaj		
M A Y	5	Love	Ravi Chavali	Sivaji, Manya, Ali, Tanikella Bharani		
M A Y	9	Ammayi Kosam	Muppalaneni Siva	Vineeth, Meena, Ravi Teja, Venu		
M A Y	9	Prematho Raa	Udayasankar	Venkatesh, Simran		
M A Y	9	Pandanti Samsaram	Krishna	Krishna, Babu Mohan, Kota Srinivasa Rao		
M A Y	23	Ninnu Choodalani	V. R. Pratap	Jr. NTR, Raveena Rajput		
M A Y	25	Chinna	Dasari Narayana Rao	Dasari Arun Kumar, Shilpa Shinde, Dasari Narayana Rao		
M A Y	25	Maa Aavida Meeda Ottu Mee Aavida Chala Manchidi	E. V. V. Satyanarayana	Srikanth, Laya, Raasi, Vadde Naveen		
M A Y	25	Andhala O Chilaka	B. Gopal	Dhanush, Siri		
M A Y	25	Sarpam	Pramod Kumar			
J U N	1	Family Circus	Teja	Jagapati Babu, Rajendra Prasad, Roja		
J U N	1	Repallelo Radha	Sarath	Dileep, Deeksha, Gummadi, Satyanarayana		
J U N	1	Vayasu	Sai Sagar	Ramesh Mitra, Yada Krishna		
J U N	7	Bava Nachadu	KS Ravikumar	Nagarjuna, Simran, Reema Sen		
J U N	8	6 Teens	G. Nageswara Reddy	Rohit, Ruthika, Santosh		
J U N	15	Bhalevadivi Basu	P. A. Arun Prasad	Balakrishna Nandamuri, Shilpa Shetty, Anjala Zaveri		
J U N	22	Vechi Vunta	Sriram Murthy	Raja, Uttej, Krishna Bhagavaan		
J U N	29	Kalisi Naduddam	Kodi Ramakrishna	Srikanth, Soundarya, Rama Prabha, Brahmanandam		
J U N	29	Khaki Chokka	Vikky	Sai Kumar, Neelambari, Thriller Manju		

== July–December ==
Opening		Title	Director	Cast	Production house	Ref
J U L	1	Simharasi	V. Samudra	Rajasekhar, Sakshi Shivanand		
J U L	9	Atu America Itu India	Gummaluri Shastry	Sunny, Vanessa, Vijay Nainan		
J U L	13	Ramma Chilakamma	Tammareddy Bharadwaja	Sumanth, Laya		
J U L	13	Sampangi	Sanayadi Reddy	Deepak, Kanchi Kaul		
J U L	18	Naa Manasistha Raa	R.R.Shinde	Srikanth, Richa, Soundarya		
J U L	27	Jackpot	G. Kasinath	Kashinath, Naveena, L. B. Sriram, Jaya Prakash Reddy		
A U G	3	Tholi Valapu	Muthyala Subbaiah	Gopichand, Sneha		
A U G	4	Subhakaryam	Ravi Raja Pinisetty	Rajasekhar, Naveen, Asha Saini		
A U G	9	Wife	Ravipalli Rambabu	Sivaji, Preetha Vijayakumar		
A U G	10	Nuvvu Nenu	Teja	Uday Kiran, Anitha		
A U G	10	Evadra Rowdy	Sarath	Srihari, Sanghavi, Sujatha		
A U G	17	Tara	Maniraj	Akash, Ruthika, Gundu Hanumantha Rao		
A U G	17	Subhasissulu	M Nagarjuna Reddy	Anil Raj, Varsha, Giri Babu		
A U G	23	Akasa Veedhilo	Singeetam Srinivasa Rao	Nagarjuna, Raveena Tandon		
A U G	23	Cheppalani Vundi	Chandra Mahesh	Naveen, Raasi, Kanchi Kaul		
A U G	31	Chandu	Veeru K	Pavan Kumar, Archana, Preethi		
S E P	1	Naalo Unna Prema	Pratap	Jagapathi Babu, Gajala, Laya		
S E P	6	Nuvvu Naaku Nachav	Vijaya Bhaskar	Venkatesh, Arthi Agarwal		
S E P	14	Itlu Sravani Subramanyam	Puri Jagannadh	Ravi Teja, Tanu Roy		
S E P	19	Adhipathi	Ravi Raja Pinisetty	Mohan Babu, Nagarjuna, Preeti Jhangiani, Soundarya		
S E P	19	Idhe Naa Modhati Premalekha	G. Nageswara Reddy	Jayaram, Rimmi Sen		
S E P	21	Chiranjeevulu	Radha Krishna	Ravi Teja, Sanghavi, Sivaji		
S E P	21	Chirujallu	Sriram Balaji	Tarun, Richa Pallod		
S E P	27	Student No.1	S. S. Rajamouli	Jr. NTR, Gajala		
S E P	28	Anandam	Srinu Vaitla	Jai Akash, Rekha Vedavyas		
S E P	28	Time Pass	Sanfireddy Dasaradh	Ajay, Asha Saini, Janardhan Maharshi		
O C T	4	Daddy	Suresh Krishna	Chiranjeevi, Simran, Ashima Bhalla		
O C T	12	Thank You Subba Rao	E. V. V. Satyanarayana	Srihari, Prakash Raj, Abhirami		
O C T	19	Manasantha Nuvve	V. N. Aditya	Uday Kiran, Reema Sen		
O C T	19	Prema Sandadi	P. A. Arun Prasad	Srikanth, Anjala Zaveri		
O C T	19	Snehithuda	K S Nageswara Rao	Sivaji, Rakesh, Reena		
O C T	26	Snehamante Idera	Balasekaran	Nagarjuna, Sumanth, Bhoomika Chawla		
O C T	26	Muthyam	Vasan	Rohit, Anu		
N O V	1	Raa	K. S. Nageswara Rao	Upendra, Priyanka Upendra		
N O V	9	Hyderabad	Ayyappa P. Sharma	Ayyappa P. Sharma, Venu Madhav, P. J. Sarma		
N O V	9	Ammaye Navvithe	Jyothi Kumar	Rajendra Prasad, Bhavana, Brahmanandam		
N O V	15	Veedekkadi Mogudandi?	E. V. V. Satyanarayana	Venu, Shruthi Raj, Geethu Mohandas		
N O V	29	Jabili	S. V. Krishna Reddy	Dileep, Rekha Vedavyas		
N O V	14	Paravasam	K.Balachander	R. Madhavan, Simran Bagga, Sneha, Lawrence Raghavendra		
N O V	30	Athanu	Satyam Babu	Sai Kumar, Rachana, Ravi Varma		
N O V	30	Little Hearts	Srikanth	R. Venkateswar, Gayathri Priya, Murali Mohan, M. S. Narayana		
D E C	6	Bhadrachalam	N.Shankar	Srihari, Sindhu Menon		
D E C	21	Hanuman Junction	Mohan Raja	Jagapati Babu, Arjun		
D E C	21	Subbu	Rudraraju Suresh Varma	Jr. NTR, Sonali Joshi		
D E C	30	Darling Darling	V. Samudra	Srikanth, Shaheen Khan, Sai Kiran		
D E C	30	Ishtam	Vikram Kumar	Charan, Shriya Saran		

=== Other releases ===
The following films were also released in 2001, though the release date remains unknown.
Title	Director	Cast	Studio	Ref
Apparao ki Oka Nela Thappindi	Relangi Narasimha Rao	Rajendra Prasad, Madhusmita	Vishaka Talkies, Chaplin Comedy Creations	

== See also ==
- List of Telugu films of 2000
- Lists of Telugu-language films
- List of Telugu films of 2002
