= List of Telugu films of 2002 =

This is a list of films produced by the Telugu language film industry based in Hyderabad in the year 2002.

== Box office ==
Highest-grossing films of 2002
Rank	Title	Studio	Worldwide gross	Ref.
1	Indra	Vyjayanthi Movies	₹40–55 crore	

== January–June ==
Opening		Title	Director	Cast	Production house	Ref
J A N	11	Seema Simham	G. Ram Prasad	Nandamuri Balakrishna, Simran, Reemma Sen, P. Vasu		
J A N	12	Takkari Donga	Jayanth C. Paranjee	Mahesh Babu, Lisa Ray, Bipasha Basu, Krishna Ghattamaneni		
J A N	14	Nuvvu Leka Nenu Lenu	Y. Kasi Viswanath	Tarun, Aarthi Agarwal, Laya, Sarath Babu		
J A N	18	Premaku Swagatam	S. V. Krishna Reddy	J. D. Chakravarthy, Soundarya		
J A N	25	Priya Nestama	R. Ganapathy	Venu, Shama, Malavika		
J A N	25	O Chinnadana	E. Sathibabu	Srikanth, Raja, Gajala, Asha Saini, Shruthi Raj		
F E B	1	Neethone Vuntanu	T. Prabhakar	Upendra, Sanghavi, Rachana Banerjee		
F E B	1	Raghava	Y. Nageswara Rao	Suresh, Rajasri, Kota Srinivasa Rao, Brahmanandam		
F E B	8	Kalusukovalani	Raghu Raj	Uday Kiran, Gajala, Pratyusha		
F E B	8	Kondaveeti Simhasanam	Dasari Narayana Rao	Mohan Babu, Soundarya, Udaya Bhanu		
F E B	14	Nenu Ninnu Premistunnanu	G. Haribabu	Prasanna, Keerthi Shaheen, Amrutha, Ahuti Prasad		
F E B	15	Chandravamsam	J. K. Bharavi	Krishna Ghattamaneni, Jaya Pradha, Sivaji, Rohit		
F E B	15	Action No. 1	Sagar	Ram, Lakshman, Thriller Manju, Vani Viswanath		
F E B	26	Ramana	Siva Nageswara Rao	Rajendra Babu, Mahi, Brahmanandam, Tanikella Bharani		
F E B	26	Lagna Patrika	Subburaju	Babloo Prithviraj, Sanghavi, Brahmanandam, Phaniraj Kumar		
F E B	28	Seshu	Jeevitha Rajashekar	Rajasekhar, Kalyani, Nassar		
M A R	1	Nee Premakai	Muppulaneni Siva	Vineeth, Abbas, Laya, Sonia Agarwal		
M A R	7	Parasuram	Mohan Gandhi	Srihari, Sanghavi		
M A R	8	Neetho Cheppalani	B. Satya Naidu	Akash, Anupriya, Ashita		
M A R	9	Naga Pratista		Raasi, Sreejith		
M A R	15	Mee Kosam	V. Janardhan	Ramyasri, Samaram, Sharmila		
M A R	22	Nuvvunte Chaalu	Achyuth Reddy	Adarsha, Sonali Raj		
M A R	22	Entha Bagundo	Bharadwaja Thammareddy	Sai Kiran, Laya		
M A R	22	Chelia Chelia Chiru Kopama	Sai Shyam	Nivas, Shikha Sinha		
M A R	28	Aadi	V. V. Vinayak	Jr. NTR, Keerthi Chawla		
M A R	28	Nee Thodu Kavali	Bheemaneni Srinivas Rao	Deepak, Charmy Kaur, Rimi Sen		
A P R	4	Aaduthu Paaduthu	Devi Prasad	Srikanth, Sunil, Gayatri Jayaraman		
A P R	10	Vasu	A. Karunakaran	Venkatesh, Bhoomika Chawla		
A P R	10	Priyadarshini	Dhavala Mallik	Surya Vamsi, Sunitha Varma, Brahmanandam		
A P R	13	Bejawada Police Station	Chimakurthi Hari Babu	Keshav, Shilpa Shivanand, Brahmaji, Ali, Chinna		
A P R	13	Friends	Bandi Ramesh	Sivaji, Ali		
A P R	19	Narahari	Thriller Manju	Sai Kumar, Thriller Manju, Sreedevi		
A P R	25	Manasunte Chaalu	Jonnalagadda Srinivasa Rao	Sai Kiran, Sivaji, Jennifer Kotwal		
A P R	25	Mounamelanoyi	Shyam Prasad	Sachin, Sampadha, Chalapathi Rao		
M A Y	1	Lahiri Lahiri Lahirilo	Y. V. S. Chowdary	Nandamuri Harikrishna, Bhanupriya, Rachana Banerjee, Ankitha		
M A Y	3	Vendi Mabbulu	Raviraja Pinisetty	Balayya, Pulakit, Anil, Mona Chopra, Meghana Naidu, Mitika		
M A Y	9	Santosham	Dasaradh	Nagarjuna, Gracy Singh, Prabhu Deva, Shriya Saran		
M A Y	10	Allari	Ravi Babu	Naresh, Anuradha Mehta		
M A Y	17	Manasutho	Ravi Kumar Chowdary	Jai Akash, Arzoo Govitrikar, Khayyam		
M A Y	17	Sahasa Baludu Vichitra Kothi	Dasharatha Raju	Vijayashanti, Brahmanandam, Sarath Babu, Sudha		
M A Y	22	Tappu Chesi Pappu Koodu	A. Kodandarami Reddy	Mohan Babu, Srikanth, Gracy Singh		
M A Y	24	Hai	E. V. V. Satyanarayana	Aryan Rajesh, Nikita Thukral		
M A Y	31	Vooru Manadiraa	R. Narayana Murthy	R. Narayana Murthy, Siddappa Naidu		
J U N	1	Devi Nagamma	Alahari	Prema, Baby Deepika, Jackie, Mani Chandana, Mada, Somayajulu, Jeeva		
J U N	6	Adrustam	Sekhar Suri	Tarun, Gajala, Reemma Sen, Asha Saini		
J U N	14	Jayam	Teja	Nitin, Sadha, Tottempudi Gopichand		
J U N	14	Hrudayanjali	A. Raghurami Reddy	Sanjay Mitra, Girija Shettar		
J U N	21	Sreeram	V. N. Aditya	Uday Kiran, Anitha Hassanandani, Ashish Vidyarthi		
J U N	27	Neetho	John Mahendran	Suryaprakash, Mahek Chahal,		
J U N	28	Kanulu Moosina Neevaye	Manjula Naidu	Deepak, Archana		

== July–December ==
Opening		Title	Director	Cast	Production house	Ref
J U L	5	Janam	Ayyappa P. Sharma	Sai Kumar, Vani Viswanath, Thriller Manju, Dasari Arun Kumar, Zarina		
J U L	5	Girl Friend	G. Nageswara Reddy	Rohit, Anitha Patil		
J U L	18	Allari Ramudu	B. Gopal	Jr. NTR, Aarti Agarwal, Gajala		
J U L	24	Indra	B. Gopal	Chiranjeevi, Sonali Bendre, Aarti Agarwal		
A U G	2	Avunu Valliddaru Ista Paddaru!	Vamsi	Ravi Teja, Kalyani		
A U G	3	Ninne Cherukunta		Revanth, Shwetha, Chandra Mohan		
A U G	9	Kuchi Kuchi Koonamma	Ashok Kumar	Jakeer, Siri, K. Viswanath		
A U G	9	Vachina Vaadu Suryudu	Mandava Gopala Krishna	Krisha, Lakshmana Swamy, Vijayachander, Rahul, Lahari		
A U G	22	Idiot	Puri Jagannadh	Ravi Teja, Rakshita		
A U G	22	Sontham	Srinu Vaitla	Aryan Rajesh, Namitha, Rohit, Sunil		
A U G	30	Holi	Vara Prasad	Uday Kiran, Richa Pallod, Sunil		
A U G	30	Prudhvi Narayana	P. Vasu	Srihari, Vijayalakshmi, Meghana Naidu, Lakshmi		
A U G	30	Prema Sakshiga	V. Jyothi Kumar	Vijay, Swetha, Anjali, Sraavan		
S E P	6	Bharata Simha Reddy	Surya Prakash	Rajasekhar, Meena, Gajala, Ravali, Brahmanandam		
S E P	13	Manamiddaram	Gosangi Subba Ra	Raja Sridhar, Sonali Joshi, Lahari		
S E P	13	Khaidi Brothers	Sahar	Sai Kumar, Lakshman, Ram, Surya Prakash, Rekha		
S E P	18	Okato Number Kurraadu	A. Kodandarami Reddy	Nandamuri Taraka Ratna, Rekha Vedavyas, Brahmanandam		
S E P	25	Chennakeshava Reddy	V. V. Vinayak	Nandamuri Balakrishna, Shriya Saran, Tabu, Devayani		
S E P	25	Malli Malli Chudali	Pawan Sridhar	Venu, Janani		
S E P	25	Aahuti	Y. Sai Nivas	Chandra Babu		
O C T	2	Prema Donga	Ramana	Srihari, Soundarya, Vinod		
O C T	2	Janda	Kodi Ramakrishna	Ajju, Sravan, Akrithi		
O C T	10	Nuvve Nuvve	Trivikram Srinivas	Tarun, Shriya Saran, Prakash Raj		
O C T	11	Gemeni	Saran	Venkatesh, Namitha, Mumtaj		
O C T	18	Dhanalakshmi, I Love You	Siva Nageswara Rao	Allari Naresh, Aditya Om, NAresh, Ankitha		
O C T	18	Pilisthe Palukutha	Kodi Ramakrishna	Jai Akash, Shamita Shetty		
O C T	18	Police Sisters	Vikki	Roja, Raasi, Sridhar, Brahmanandam		
O C T	31	Bobby	Sobhan	Mahesh Babu, Aarti Agarwal		
N O V	1	Nee Sneham	Parichuri Murali	Uday Kiran, Aarti Agarwal, Jatin Grewal		
N O V	1	Siva Rama Raju	V. Samudra	Jagapathi Babu, Mounika, Venkat, Nandamuri Harikrishna		
N O V	10	Eeswar	Jayanth C. Paranjee	Prabhas, Sridevi Vijayakumar, Revathi		
N O V	22	2 Much	K. Veeru	Balakumar, Ruthika, Ali		
N O V	29	Khadgam	Krishna Vamshi	Ravi Teja, Srikanth, Sonali Bendre, Prakash Raj, Kim Sharma, Sangeetha		
N O V	29	Yuva Rathna	U. Narayana Rao	Nandamuri Taraka Ram, Jeevitha		
D E C	6	Thotti Gang	E. V. V. Satyanarayana	Allari Naresh, Prabhu Deva, Sunil, Anitha, Gajala		
D E C	6	Trinetram	Kodi Ramakrishna	Sijju, Raasi		
D E C	13	Sandade Sandadi	Muppalaneni Siva	Rajendra Prasad, Jagapathi Babu, Raasi		
D E C	13	Coolie		Srihari, Raasi, Mumtaj		
D E C	13	Premalo Pavani Kalyan	Polur Ghatikachalam	Deepak, Ankitha		
D E C	20	Manmadhudu	K. Vijaya Bhaskar	Nagarjuna, Sonali Bendre, Anshu		
D E C	20	Ninu Choodaka Nenundalenu	R. Srinivas	Sachin, Bhavana Pani		
D E C	27	Anveshana	Sagar	Ravi Teja, Radhika Varma, Bose		

=== Other releases ===
The following films were also released in 2002, though the release date remains unknown.

Title	Director	Cast	Studio	Ref
Rifles	Dasari Narayana Rao	Vijaya Shanthi, Dasari Arun Kumar		

== See also ==
- List of Telugu films of 2001
- Lists of Telugu-language films
- List of Telugu films of 2003
