= List of Telugu films of 2003 =

This is a list of films produced by the Tollywood (Telugu language film industry) based in Hyderabad in the year 2003.

== Box office ==
Highest-grossing films of 2003
Rank	Title	Studio	Worldwide gross	Ref
1	Tagore	Leo Projects Private Limited	₹45 crore	

== January–June ==
Opening		Title	Director	Cast	Production house	Ref
J A N	10	Naaga	D. K. Suresh	Jr. NTR, Sadha, Jennifer, Raghuvaran, Nassar		Produced by Surya Movies
J A N	11	Evare Athagadu	Bhanu Shankar	Vallabha, Priyamani, Jaya Seal, Brahmanandam		
J A N	14	Ee Abbai Chala Manchodu	Agathiyan	Ravi Teja, Sangeetha, Vani		
J A N	15	Okkadu	Gunasekhar	Mahesh Babu, Bhoomika Chawla, Prakash Raj		
J A N	15	Pellam Oorelithe	S. V. Krishna Reddy	Srikanth, Venu, Rakshita, Sangeetha, Brahmanandam, Sunil		
J A N	24	Juniors	J. Pulla Rao	Allari Naresh, Sherin, Pawan, Prakash Raj		
J A N	30	Ammayilu Abbayilu	Ravi Babu	Vijay, Mohit, Vidya, Sonu Sood, Devina, Swapna Madhuri		
J A N	31	Idi Maa Ashokgadi Love Story	Suresh Krissna	Siva Balaji, Shweta Agarwal, Kanchi Kaul		
F E B	6	Fools	Dasari Narayana Rao	Dasari Narayana Rao, Srinath, Gajala, Kovai Sarala		
F E B	7	Utsaham	Allani Sridhar	Sai Kiran, Sunitha Varma, Amar		
F E B	16	Kabaddi Kabaddi	Venki	Jagapati Babu, Kalyani, Surya, Jeeva		
F E B	21	Golmaal	P. N. Ramachandra Rao	J. D. Chakravarthy, Ramesh Arvind, Meera Vasudevan, Neha Pendse, Giri Babu, Jayaprakash Reddy, Brahmanandam		
F E B	26	Indiramma	Ammineni Madhava Sai	Vijayashanti, Achyuth, Vijayakumar		
M A R	9	Vijayam	Singeetham Srinivasa Rao	Raja, Gajala, Sunil, Murali Mohan		
M A R	28	Raghavendra	Suresh Krissna	Prabhas, Shweta Agarwal, Anshu, Brahmanandam, Murali Mohan		Produced by Sri Sai Arts
M A R	28	Gangotri	K. Raghavendra Rao	Allu Arjun, Aditi Agarwal, Suman, Prakash Raj		Produced by United Producers
A P R	2	Hari Villu	B. Narsing Rao	Bhanuchander, Haritha, Master Sai Subhakar, Baby Nitya		Produced by Suresh Productions
A P R	3	Taarak	Balasekaran	N. T. Rathnaa, Sharmili, Krishna		
A P R	3	Karthik	Murali Raju	Mukesh, Kanishka		
A P R	4	Dil	V. V. Vinayak	Nitin, Neha, Prakash Raj		
A P R	11	Aithe	Chandra Sekhar Yeleti	Shashank, Sindhu Tolani, Abhishek, Mohit		
A P R	11	Dhanush	Nallamothu Sreenivasa Rao	Vadde Naveen, Kiran Gill, Sivaji Raja, Brahmanandam		Produced by Prasanthi Productions
A P R	19	Amma Nanna O Tamila Ammayi	Puri Jagannadh	Ravi Teja, Asin, Jayasudha, Prakash Raj, Ali		
A P R	25	Johnny	Pawan Kalyan	Pawan Kalyan, Renu Desai, Raghuvaran, M. S. Narayana		Produced by Geeta Arts
A P R	26	Ottesi Cheputunna	E. Sathi Babu	Srikanth, Sivaji, Sravanthi, Anitha Patel, Sunil		
M A Y	16	Appudappudu	Chandra Siddhartha	Raja, Sriya Reddy, Jayasudha, Kaikala Satyanarayana		Produced by GB Films
M A Y	18	Maa Bapu Bommaku Pellanta	Ravi Raja Pinisetty	Ajay Raghavendra, Gayathri Raguram, Aravind Akash		Produced by Swarna Chitra
M A Y	22	Aayudham	N. Shankar	Rajasekhar, Sangita, Gurleen Chopra		
M A Y	23	Nijam	Teja	Mahesh Babu, Gopichand, Rakshita, Raasi		
J U N	5	Palnati Brahmanayudu	B. Gopal	Nandamuri Balakrishna, Sonali Bendre, Aarti Agarwal, Mukesh Rishi		Produced by Venkata Ramana Productions
J U N	12	Ninne Ishtapaddanu	Konda	Tarun, Sridevi Vijayakumar, Anitha, Giri Babu		
J U N	19	Oka Raju Oka Rani	Yogi M	Ravi Teja, Namitha, Brahmanandam, Tanikella Bharani, M. S. Narayana		Produced by Ushakiran Movies
J U N	26	Donga Ramudu & Party	Vamsi	Srikanth, Laya, Chandra Mohan, Kaikala Satyanarayana		

== July–December ==
Opening		Title	Director	Cast	Production house	Ref
J U L	9	Simhadri	S. S. Rajamouli	Jr. NTR, Bhoomika Chawla, Ankitha, Nassar		Produced by Vijaya Maruthi Creations
J U L	11	Vasantam	Vikraman	Daggubati Venkatesh, Aarti Agarwal, Kalyani, Tanikella Bharani, Sunil		Produced by Sri Sai Deva Productions
J U L	18	Kalyana Ramudu	G. Ramprasad	Venu Thottempudi, Prabhu Deva, Nikita Thukral, Suman, Sunil		Produced by SP Entertainments
J U L	25	Praanam	Malli	Allari Naresh, Sadha, Seetha, M. S. Narayana, Kovai Sarala		Produced by GMRC
J U L	25	Shambhu	R. Suresh Verma	Aryan Rajesh, Sarika, Chandra Mohan, Venu Madhav, Prakash Raj, Sanghavi		Produced by Sabari Girisha
J U L	25	Dhum	Raju Voopati	Jagapati Babu, Chaitanya Krishna, Neha Mehta, Sonia Agarwal		Produced by Radaan Mediaworks Pvt Limited
J U L	25	City	Ambati Subhash	Mukesh Udeshi, Swapna Reddy, Vaibhavi		Produced by Tanya Films Corporation
J U L	31	Sambaram	K. Dasaradh	Nitin, Nikita Thukral, Giri Babu, Seetha		Produced by Chitram Movies
A U G	7	Dongodu	Bheemineni Srinivas	Ravi Teja, Kalyani, Rekha Vedavyas, Tanikella Bharani		Produced by Goodwill Cinema
A U G	8	Simhachalam	Indra Kumar	Srihari, Meena, Prakash Raj, Suresh, Sunil		Produced by Chandrahasa Cinema
A U G	15	Neeku Nenu Naaku Nuvvu	Raja Shekar	Uday Kiran, Shriya Saran, Krishnam Raju, Suman		Produced by Suresh Productions
A U G	15	Anaganaga O Kurraadu	L P Ramarao	Rohit, Rekha Vedavyas, Rajeev Kanakala		Produced by Sri Sai Ooha Creations
A U G	15	Charminar	Sagar	Venkat, Abhirami, Prakash Raj		Produced by Sri Kali productions
A U G	22	Seetayya	YVS Chowdhary	Nandamuri Harikrishna, Simran, Soundarya, Mukesh Rishi		
A U G	30	Aadanthe Ado Type	E. V. V. Satyanarayana	Sivaji, Aryan Rajesh, Bhoomika Chawla, Anitha Hassandhani		
S E P	5	Oka Radha Iddaru Krishnula Pelli	G. Nageswara Reddy	Srikanth, Prabhu Deva, Namitha, Tanikella Bharani, Chandra Mohan		
S E P	12	Janaki Weds Sriram	Anji	Rohit, Gajala, Rekha Vedavyas		
S E P	12	Pellamtho Panenti	S. V. Krishna Reddy	Venu Thottempudi, Laya, Kalyani		
S E P	18	Okato Number Kurraadu	A. Kodandarami Reddy	Taraka Ratna, Rekha Vedavyas, Brahmanandam		
S E P	24	Tagore	V. V. Vinayak	Chiranjeevi, Jyothika, Shriya Saran		
S E P	28	Vishnu	Shaji Kailas	Vishnu Manchu, Vedhika, Neetu Chandra		
O C T	2	Ela Cheppanu	Ramana	Tarun, Shriya Saran, Sunil		
O C T	9	Toli Choopulone	Kasi Viswanath	Kalyan Ram, Akanksha, Charanraj, Sudeepa		Produced by Ushakiran Movies
O C T	10	Okariki Okaru	Rasool	Srikanth, Aarti Chabria, Balayya, Tanikella Bharani		Produced by Anandi Arts
O C T	16	Ori Nee Prema Bangaram Kaanu	AVS	Rajesh Krishnan, Sangeetha, Giri Babu, Bramhanandam		Produced by Maitree Talkies
O C T	23	Sivamani	Puri Jagannadh	Nagarjuna, Asin Thottumkal, Rakshita, Prakash Raj		Produced by Vaishno Devi films
O C T	31	Veede	Ravi Raja Pinisetty	Ravi Teja, Reema Sen, Aarti Agarwal, Shayaji Shinde		
N O V	7	Srirama Chandrulu	Srikanth	Rajendra Prasad, Sivaji, Raasi, Rambha, Sindhu Menon, Brahmanandam, Kovai Sarala, Venu Madhav		
N O V	8	Nenu Seetamahalakshmi	G. Nageswara Reddy	Rohit, Shravya, Chalapathi Rao		
N O V	12	Abhimanyu	A Mallikarjun	Kalyan Ram, Divya Spandana, Suhasini, Sowcar Janaki, Ali		Produced by Rock Line Productions
N O V	14	Goa	P. Kishore Kumar	Sumit Roy, Subhash Chandra, Krishna Teja		
N O V	14	Nenu Pelliki Ready	Venky	Srikanth, Laya, Sangeetha, Anitha Hassandani		
N O V	14	Back Pocket		Vijay Sai, Sony Raj, Suman, Lavanya, Preeti Nigam, Anant, Sudarshan, Jenny, Seema, Vinod Bala		
N O V	21	Villain	K. S. Ravikumar	Rajasekhar, Neha Dhupia, Tulip Joshi, Naresh		
N O V	26	Chantigadu	Jaya	Baladitya, Suhasini, Saranya, Ahuti Prasad		Produced by Superhit Friends
N O V	28	Missamma	Neelakanta	Bhoomika Chawla, Sivaji, Laya, Tanikella Bharani		Produced by Satyam Entertainment
D E C	6	Nee Manasu Naaku Telusu	Jyoti Krishna	Tarun, Trisha Krishnan, Shriya Saran, Sunil, Reema Sen, Archana Puran Singh		Produced by Sri Surya Movies
D E C	6	Maa Alludu Very Good	E V V Satyanarayana	Rajendra Prasad, Allari Naresh, Ramya Krishna, Mounika, Kovai Sarala		Produced by Roja Movies
D E C	12	Neeke Manasichaanu	Surya Teja	Srikanth, Charmee Kaur, Anvithaa, Brahmanandam		Produced by GSK Arts
D E C	12	Avuna	C. Uma Maheshwara Rao	Adarsh, Santhi Rao, Surya		
D E C	18	Tiger Harischandra Prasad	V. Samudra	Nandamuri Harikrishna, Ramya Krishna, Dasari Arun Kumar, Sangeetha		
D E C	19	Satyam	Surya Kiran	Sumanth, Genelia D'Souza, Brahmanandam, Kota Srinivasa Rao		Produced by Annapoorna Studios

== See also ==
- List of Telugu films of 2002
- Lists of Telugu-language films
- List of Telugu films of 2004
