= Harini (singer) =

Indian playback singer (born 1979)

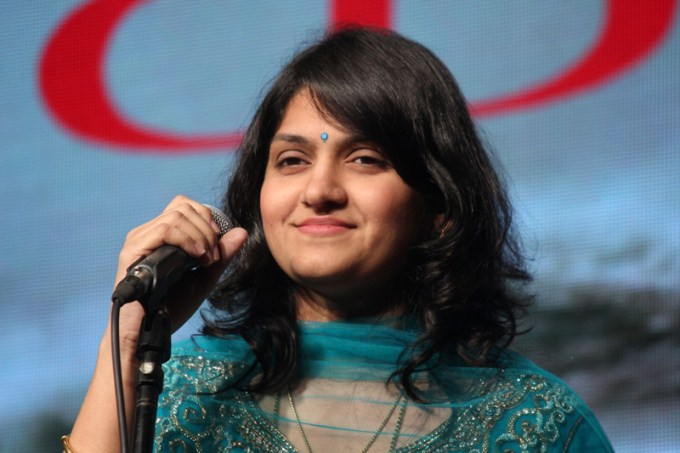
- Born: Harini Srikaran; 30 April 1979 (age 47); Chennai, Tamil Nadu, India
- Occupation: Singer
- Years active: 1995–present
- Spouse: Tippu (m. 2002)
- Children: 2, including Sai Abhyankkar

Harini (born 30 April 1979) is an Indian film playback and classical singer born and raised in Chennai. She sings predominantly in Tamil films, besides other language films such as Telugu, Malayalam, and Kannada films. She was first noticed by music director A. R. Rahman at a school competition where she was one among the winners. Eventually, she was signed in to record the song "Nila Kaigiradhu" for the film Indira (1995) when she was 15. The song went on to become one of the popular songs of the year and Harini began to get singing offers from other leading film composers.

Harini has won Best Female Playback Singer award twice at the Tamil Nadu State Film Awards for the songs "Manam Virumbuthey" (Nerukku Ner, 1997) and "Aalanguyil Koovum Rayil" (Parthiban Kanavu, 2003). The latter song won her ITFA Best Female Playback Award for the year 2004.

== Early life ==
Born on 30 April 1979 to a Tamil family, Harini learnt Carnatic music from Gowri and Radha Viswanathan from the age of four. She used to participate in school competitions and in one such competition which she won, A. R. Rahman who distributed the prizes invited the winners to his studio to record their voices. Subsequently, she was called by Suhasini Maniratnam to sing "Nila Kaigirathu" for her first film Indira. Her first song, "Nila Kaigirathu", was recorded at the age of 15. Since then, she has received offers from various music directors across South India. Within a career spanning a decade, she sang over 3500 songs four south Indian languages in which 35 devotional albums in Tamil, Telugu and Malayalam.

== Personal life ==
Harini is married to singer Tippu. A strong believer and follower of Sathya Sai Baba, Tippu married Harini in Puttaparthi when they both were 22 years. They have a daughter named Sai Smriti and son, Sai Abhyankkar, who made his singing debut with the single "Katchi Sera" in 2024.

== Discography ==
=== Tamil ===
Year	Film name	Song title	Composer	Co-singers
1995	Indira	"Nila Kaaigiradhu"	A. R. Rahman	
1996	Indian	"Telephone Manipol"	A. R. Rahman	Hariharan
1996	Gnanapazham	“Onnum Onnum”	K. Bhagyaraj	K. Bhagyaraj
1997	Iruvar	"Hello Mr. Edhirkatchi"	A. R. Rahman	Rajagopal
1997	Pistha	"Azhagu Puyalaa"	S. A. Rajkumar	
1997	Nerukku Ner	"Manam Virumbuthey"	Deva	
1997	Ratchagan	"Soniya Soniya"	A. R. Rahman	Udit Narayan, Unnikrishnan
1997	Ullaasam	"Cho Larey"	Karthik Raja	S. P. Balasubrahmanyam, Venkat Prabhu
1997	Ullaasam	"Konjum Manjal"	Karthik Raja	Hariharan
1997	Ullaasam	"Veesum Kaatrukku"	Karthik Raja	Unnikrishnan
1997	Vallal	“Thala Thalakira”	Deva	Mano
1997	Arasiyal	"Varai En Thozhiyae"	Vidyasagar	S. P. Charan, Shubha Mudgal
1998	Kannedhirey Thondrinal	"Chandaa O Chandaa"	Deva	
1998	Jeans	"Vaarayo Thozhi"	A. R. Rahman	Sonu Nigam, Shahul Hameed, Sangeetha Sajith
1998	Natpukkaga	"Adikkira Kai"	Deva	
1998	Ulavuthurai	"Love Love"	Shah	Annupamaa
1998	Kangalin Vaarthaigal	"Alli Sundaravalli"	Ilaiyaraaja	Arunmozhi
1998	Kangalin Vaarthaigal	"Muthu Muthu"	Ilaiyaraaja	Mano
1998	Vaettiya Madichu Kattu	"Kichu Kichu Thambulam"	Deva	G. V. Prakash Kumar
1998	Sandhippoma	"Naanthaan"	Deva	
1998	Nilaave Vaa	"Chandira Mandalathai"	Vidyasagar	Vijay, S. P. Charan
1998	Unnudan	"Kandupidi"	Deva	S. P. Balasubrahmanyam
1998	En Uyir Neethaane	"Symphony"	Deva	Unnikrishnan
1998	Uyirodu Uyiraga	"Nothing Nothing"	Vidyasagar	
1998	Uyirodu Uyiraga	"Poovukellam Siragu"	Vidyasagar	Srinivas, KK
1998	Uyirodu Uyiraga	"Vannakili SolKonda"	Vidyasagar	Gopal Rao
1998	Cheran Chozhan Pandian	"Thirunelveli Halwa"	Soundaryan	Sirkazhi G. Sivachidambaram, Krishnaraj
1999	En Swasa Kaatre	"Kadhal Niagara"	A. R. Rahman	Palakkad Sreeram, Annupamaa
1999	Minsara Kanna	"Oodha Oodha"	Deva	Hariharan
1999	Mudhalvan	"Azhagana Ratchasiye"	A. R. Rahman	S. P. Balasubrahmanyam
1999	Nee Varuvai Ena	"Poonguyil Paatu"	S. A. Rajkumar	Arunmozhi
1999	Kadhal Vennila	"Karkandu Kannam"	Mani Sharma	Mano
1999	Padayappa	"Sutthi Sutthi"	A. R. Rahman	S. P. Balasubrahmanyam
1999	Vaalee	"April Maadhathil"	Deva	Unnikrishnan
1999	Suriya Paarvai	"Ganapathi Thatha"	S. A. Rajkumar	G. V. Prakash Kumar
1999	Poomagal Oorvalam	"Chinna Vennilave"	Siva	Hariharan
1999	Nenjinile	"Prime Minister"	Deva	S. N. Surendar
1999	Pooparika Varugirom	"Thikki Thavikkiren"	Vidyasagar	Murali
1999	Jayam	"Nilavukku Ennadi"	Pradeep Ravi	
1999	Ooty	“Ooty Malai”	Deva	Unnikrishnan
1999	Pudhu Kudithanam	"Nilavukku Ennadi"	Deva	Unni Menon
1999	Sundari Neeyum Sundaran Naanum	"Unaal Thokkam Illai"	Deva	Krishnaraj
1999	Azhagarsamy	"Kaalmellaam" (female)	Deva	
1999	Paattali	"Srirangam Petru Thandha"	S. A. Rajkumar	Hariharan
1999	Paattali	"Ulaga Azhagiya"	S. A. Rajkumar	Anuradha Sriram, Srinivas
2000	Mugavaree	"Keechu Kiliye"	Deva	
2000	Alai Payuthey	"Alaipayuthey Kanna"	A. R. Rahman	Kalyani Menon, Neyveli Ramalaxmi
2000	Kushi	"Megham Karukuthu"	Deva	
2000	Appu	"Ninaithhal Nenjukkulle"	Deva	Hariharan
2000	Appu	"Yeno Yeno"	Deva	Sujatha, Hariharan
2000	Priyamaanavale	"June July Maadhathil"	S. A. Rajkumar	Shankar Mahadevan
2000	Parthen Rasithen	"Enakkena Erkanavae"	Bharadwaj	Unnikrishnan
2000	Sandhitha Velai	"Vaa Vaa En Thalaiva"	Deva	Unnikrishnan, 'Mahanadi' Shobana
2000	Athey Manithan	"Thazhal Madal" (solo)	Adithyan	
2000	Magalirkkaga	"Pudhu Rosapoo"	Varshan	
2000	Ennamma Kannu	"Thalaiva"	Deva	
2000	Doubles	"Adi Kadhal"	Srikanth Deva	Unnikrishnan
2000	Krodham 2	“Baba Baba”	Deva	Vijay Yesudas
2000	Puratchikkaaran	"Ottrai Paarvaiyila"	Vidyasagar	Srinivas
2000	Uyirile Kalanthathu	"Deva Deva Devathaiye"	Deva	Hariharan
2000	Vaanavil	"Velinattu Kaatru"	Deva	Hariharan
2000	Seenu	"Kuchalaambaal"	Deva	Unni Menon
2000	Sathyaseelan	"Mathuvoottum Vinveli Poove"	Vandemataram Srinivas	Krishnaraj
2000	En Sakhiye	"Ponnana Bhoomi"	Pradeep Ravi	
2000	Pottu Amman	"Vennilave Vennilave"	S. D. Shanthakumar	S. P. Charan, Theni Kunjarammal, Swarnalatha, Kalpana
2000	Aval Paavam	"Kuyile Poonkuyile"	Pradeep Ravi	Prasanna
2000	Aval Paavam	"Collegeile Teenageile"	Pradeep Ravi	Prasanna
2000	Nee Enthan Vaanam	"Yeah Machakaalai" (duet)	Sangeetha Rajan	Unnikrishnan
2000	Nee Enthan Vaanam	"Yeah Machakaalai" (female)	Sangeetha Rajan	
2001	Minnale	"Ivan Yaaro"	Harris Jayaraj	Unnikrishnan
2001	Aanandham	"Pallangkuzhiyin"	S. A. Rajkumar	Unnikrishnan
2001	Paarvai Ondre Podhume	"Thirumba Thirumba"	Bharani	Unnikrishnan
2001	Dheena	"Kadhal Website Ondru"	Yuvan Shankar Raja	Shankar Mahadevan
2001	Dumm Dumm Dumm	"Suttrum Bhoomi"	Karthik Raja	
2001	Dumm Dumm Dumm	"Athan Varuvaaga"	Karthik Raja	Tippu, Karthik, Malgudi Subha, Chitra Sivaraman
2001	Maayan	"Maayavane"	Deva	
2001	Paarthale Paravasam	"Ada Moondrezhuthu"	A. R. Rahman	Karthik
2001	Vaanchinathan	"Muthamida Vendum"	Karthik Raja	Srinivas
2001	Ullam Kollai Poguthae	"Anjala Anjala"	Karthik Raja	Devan Ekambaram
2001	Seerivarum Kaalai	"Raathiri Nadu Raathiri"	Sirpy	S. P. Charan
2001	Middle Class Madhavan	"En Success Theriyadha"	Dhina	
2001	Middle Class Madhavan	"Hamma Hamma"	Dhina	Srinivas
2001	Sigamani Ramamani	"O Nadha"	Chandrabose	Chandrabose
2001	Citizen	“Australia Desam”	Deva	Hariharan
2001	Lovely	"I Na Sabai"	Deva	Srinivas
2001	Narasimha	"Egipthu Raani"	Mani Sharma	Shankar Mahadevan
2001	Narasimha	"Mandela Mandela"	Mani Sharma	Kalpana
2001	Super Kudumbam	"Yenthen Selaiyum"	Adithyan	Srinivas
2001	Kanna Unnai Thedukiren	"Konjum Kuyil Pattu"	Ilaiyaraaja	Anuradha Sriram
2001	Kanna Unnai Thedukiren	"Rasathi Rasathi"	Ilaiyaraaja	Anuradha Sriram, Arunmozhi
2001	Samudhiram	"Azhagana Chinna Devathai"	Sabesh-Murali	Shankar Mahadevan
2001	Alli Thandha Vaanam	"Thom Thom"	Vidyasagar	Hariharan, K. S. Chithra
2001	Aandan Adimai	"Enna Enna Paada"	Ilaiyaraaja	Bhavatharini
2001	Ponnana Neram	"Hello Hai Mamo"	Pradeep Ravi	Prasanna
2001	Kadal Pookkal	"Paithiyamaanene"	Deva	Unnikrishnan
2002	Kadhal Virus	"Sonnalum Ketpadhillai"	A. R. Rahman	Unnikrishnan
2002	Panchathantiram	"Ennodu Kaadhal"	Deva	Mano
2002	Sri Bannari Amman	"Kalakkuthu Karagaatam"	T. Rajendar	Silambarasan
2002	Samurai	"Aagaya Suriyanai"	Harris Jayaraj	Harish Raghavendra
2002	Youth	"Sagiyae Sagiyae"	Mani Sharma	Hariharan
2002	Charlie Chaplin	"Kannadi Selai Katti"	Bharani	Krishnaraj, Swarnalatha, Karthik
2002	Charlie Chaplin	"Shansha Shalpashaa"	Bharani	Tippu
2002	Thulluvadho Ilamai	"Vayadhu Vaa Vaa"	Yuvan Shankar Raja	Srinivas
2002	Thulluvadho Ilamai	"Kaatrukku Kaatrukku"	Yuvan Shankar Raja	Harish Raghavendra, Febi Mani, Sunder Rajan
2002	Nettru Varai Nee Yaaro	"Naalai Ettu Manikku"	Deva	Srinivas
2002	Ezhumalai	"Un Punnagai"	Mani Sharma	Mallikarjun
2002	Naina	"Pallikoodam Sellum Megamei"	Sabesh–Murali	Unnikrishnan
2002	Samasthanam	"Oru Kuringi Poo"	Deva	Krishnaraj, Anuradha Sriram, Srinivas
2002	Samasthanam	"Penne Penne"	Deva	Unnikrishnan, Tippu, Ganga
2002	Mutham	"La La La"	Bharani	Tippu
2003	Parthiban Kanavu	"Aalanguyil Koovum Rayil"	Vidyasagar	Srikanth
2003	Thithikudhe	"Mainave Mainave - Reprise"	Vidyasagar	Chinmayi
2003	Military	"Chittu Kuruvi"	Deva	Krishnaraj
2003	Punnagai Poove	"Venus Venus Pennae"	Yuvan Shankar Raja	Devan Ekambaram
2003	Jayam	"Kavithayae Theriyuma"	R. P. Patnaik	Manikka Vinayagam, R.P. Patnaik
2003	Kovilpatti Veeralakshmi	"Eleloa Elelo"	Adithyan	
2003	Kovilpatti Veeralakshmi	"Ola Kudisaiyiley"	Adithyan	Mano
2003	Thayumanavan	"Poonguyile"	Vaigundavasaan	Mano
2003	Anjaneya	"Vennila Vennila"	Mani Sharma	Udit Narayan
2003	Soori	"Oh My Lover"	Deva	Harish Raghavendra
2004	Arasatchi	"Iruvadhu Vayasu"	Harris Jayaraj	Febi Mani
2004	Arasatchi	"O Muhalai Muhalai"	Harris Jayaraj	Harish Raghavendra
2004	Kangalal Kaidhu Sei	"Thee Kuruviyai"	A. R. Rahman	Johnson, Mukesh Mohamed
2004	New	"Thottal Poo Malarum"	A. R. Rahman	Hariharan
2004	Thendral	"Pachai Kili"	Vidyasagar	Karthik
2004	Vaanam Vasappadum	"Megame Megame"	Mahesh Mahadevan	
2004	Sema Ragalai	"Agravin Aarambamae"	Simmam Kumar	Harish Raghavendra
2004	Sullan	"Adho Varaa"	Vidyasagar	Pushpavanam Kuppusamy
2004	Sound Party	"Raasathi"	Deva	Tippu
2004	Arivumani	"Poopol"	Janakiraj	Karthik
2004	Maha Nadigan	"Vayase Vayase"	Deva	
2005	Anniyan	"Kumaari"	Harris Jayaraj	Shankar Mahadevan
2005	Anniyan	"Iyengaaru Veetu Azhage"	Harris Jayaraj	Hariharan
2005	Girivalam	"Nee Yaaro Nee Yaaro"	Deva	Tippu
2005	Majaa	"Chi Chi Chi"	Vidyasagar	Shankar Mahadevan
2005	Mazhai	"Thappe Illai"	Devi Sri Prasad	S. P. Balasubrahmanyam
2005	Thotti Jaya	"Yaaridamum"	Harris Jayaraj	Ramesh Vinayakam
2005	Ullam Ketkume	"Mazhai Mazhai"	Harris Jayaraj	Unnikrishnan
2005	Thambi	"Sudum Nilavu"	Vidyasagar	Unnikrishnan
2005	Aayudham	"Aalakala Visham"	Dhina	
2005	Aayudham	"Hormone Surrakuthu"	Dhina	KK
2005	Rightaa Thappaa	"Yaaridam Solven"	Karthik Raja	
2005	Sevvel	"Kalla Parvai"	Aasan	Harish Raghavendra
2006	Kodambakkam	"Ragasiyamanathu Kaadhal"	Sirpy	Harish Raghavendra
2006	Kodambakkam	"Ragasiyamanathu Kaadhal" (Solo)	Sirpy	
2006	Saravana	"Saa Poo Three Pottu"	Srikanth Deva	Karthik, Anuradha Sriram, Baby Vaishali
2006	Madrasi	"Oru Unmai Sollava"	D. Imman	Karthik
2006	Uyir	"Kanne Kadhal Nilame"	Joshua Sridhar	Pradeep
2006	Poi	"Iyakkunare"	Vidyasagar	Sriram Parthasarathy
2007	Unnale Unnale	"Unnale Unnale"	Harris Jayaraj	Karthik, Krish
2007	Agaram	"Adadaa Adadaa"	Yuvan Shankar Raja	Anoop Sankar
2007	Manikanda	"Pondicherry"	Deva	Shankar Mahadevan
2007	Nee Naan Nila	"Unnai Sandhithaen"	Dhina	Harish Raghavendra
2007	En Uyirinum Melana	"Oru Nimidam Poru"	Deva	M. G. Sreekumar
2007	Cheena Thaana 001	"Unnai Paartha"	Deva	Karthik
2007	Vegam	"Kya Bole"	Rajhesh Vaidhya	Tippu
2007	Thavam	"Meenu Meenukutty"	D. Imman	Adarsh
2008	Bheema	"Siru Paarvayalae"	Harris Jayaraj	Karthik
2008	Pirivom Santhippom	"Medhuvaa Medhuvaa"	Vidyasagar	Karthik
2008	Raman Thediya Seethai	"Ippave Ippave"	Vidyasagar	Madhu Balakrishnan
2008	Poo	"Maaman Engirukka"	S. S. Kumaran	Karthik, Tippu, Master Rohith
2008	Valluvan Vasuki	"Sollaama" (I)	S. A. Rajkumar	Karthik
2008	Arai En 305-il Kadavul	"Kurai Ondrum Illai"	Vidyasagar	
2008	Kasimedu Govindan	"Mottu Vediththadhu"	Soundaryan	
2008	Kodaikanal	"Mettu Mettu"	Deva	
2008	Nadigai	"Enda Munuswamy"	Babu Ganesh	Babu Ganesh
2009	Padikkadavan	"Kadavulum Kadhalum"	Mani Sharma	Karthik
2009	Aadhavan	"Hasili Fisili"	Harris Jayaraj	Karthik, Dr. Burn, Maya
2009	Adhe Neram Adhe Idam	"Mudhal Murai"	Premgi Amaren	Tippu, Haricharan
2009	Balam	"Kanavula Paathen"	Yugendran	Balram
2009	Balam	"Devathaiye"	Yugendran	Yugendran
2010	Semmozhiyaana Thamizh Mozhiyaam	"Semmozhiyaana Thamizh Mozhiyaam"	A. R. Rahman	Various
2010	Madrasapattinam	"Pookal Pookum"	G. V. Prakash Kumar	Roopkumar Rathod, Andrea Jeremiah, G. V. Prakash Kumar
2010	Irumbukkottai Murattu Singam	"Nenjam Nenjam"	G. V. Prakash Kumar	G. V. Prakash Kumar, Sulabha
2010	Vallakottai	"Semmozhiye Semmozhiye" (I)	Dhina	S. P. Balasubrahmanyam
2010	Thenmerku Paruvakaatru	"Aathaa Adikayilae"	N. R. Raghunanthan	
2011	Narthagi	"Poovin Manam"	G. V. Prakash Kumar	Tippu
2011	Venghai	"Orey Oru"	Devi Sri Prasad	Tippu
2011	Aravaan	"Nila Nila Poguthae"	Karthik	Vijay Prakash
2011	Muthukku Muthaaga	"Man Vaasam Veesum" (female)	Kavi Periyathambi	
2011	Sadhurangam	"Vizhiyum"	Vidyasagar	Madhu Balakrishnan
2011	Mouna Guru	"Anaamika"	S. Thaman	Karthik
2012	Kadal	"Moongil Thottam"	A. R. Rahman	Abhay Jodhpurkar
2012	Vettai	"Thaiyya Thakka"	Yuvan Shankar Raja	Saindhavi
2012	Sattam Oru Iruttarai	"Adam Evaal"	Vijay Antony	Naresh Iyer
2012	Kadhalil Sodhappuvadhu Yeppadi	"Azhaipaya"	S. Thaman	Karthik
2012	Kollaikaran	"Oorae Sonnanga"	Johan Shevanesh	Rahul Nambiar, Tippu
2012	Vinmeengal	"Un Paarvai"	Jubin	Hariharan
2012	Pollangu	"Kadhalay Un"	Jubin	Naresh Iyer
2012	Pollangu	"Kadhalay Un" (remix)	Jubin	Naresh Iyer
2012	Ammavin Kaipesi	"Nenjil Eno Indru" (female)	Rohit Kulkarni	
2012	Neerparavai	"Meenuku"	N. R. Raghunanthan	Vijay Prakash
2012	Uchi Pillaiyare Charanam (album song)	"Thandanai Karathai"	Manachanallur Giridharan	
2012	Uchi Pillaiyare Charanam (album song)	"Mukshika Vahanane"	Manachanallur Giridharan	
2013	Desingu Raja	"Nelavattam Nethiyile"	D. Imman	Unnikrishnan
2013	Endrendrum Punnagai	"Vaan Engum Nee Minna"	Harris Jayaraj	Aalap Raju, Devan Ekambaram, Praveen
2013	Pathayeram Kodi	"Azhagana Poigal"	K. S. Manoj & G. D. Prasad	Prasanna
2013	Mathil Mel Poonai	"Oru Poo Pookiradhu"	Ganesh Raghavendra	Harish Raghavendra
2013	Kan Pesum Vaarthaigal	"Peyar Illa Mozhiyilae"	Shamanth	Vijay Yesudas
2013	Apple Penne	"Thoongatha Boologam"	Mani Sharma	
2013	Kalyana Samayal Saadham	"Modern Kalyanam"	Arrora	Megha, Nikhita Gandhi
2014	Idhu Kathirvelan Kadhal	"Anbe Anbe"	Harris Jayaraj	Harish Raghavendra
2014	Aranmanai	"Sonnathu Sonnathu"	Bharadwaj	Sadhana Sargam
2014	Pappali	"Ethethi"	Vijay Ebenezer	Ranjith
2014	Sooran	"Ayyanar Kuthirayilla"	P. B. Balaji	
2015	Darling	"Un Vizhigalil"	G. V. Prakash Kumar	
2015	Idhu Enna Maayam	"Irukkirai"	G. V. Prakash Kumar	G. V. Prakash Kumar
2015	Inimey Ippadithan	"Azhaga Aanazhaga"	Santhosh Dhayanidhi	
2016	Meendum Oru Kadhal Kadhai	"Yedhedho Penne"	G. V. Prakash Kumar	Ajeesh
2017	Vanamagan	"Pachchai Uduthiya"	Harris Jayaraj	Abhay Jodhpurkar
2017	Solli Vidava	"Uyire Uyire"	Jassie Gift	G. V. Prakash Kumar
2017	Solli Vidava	"Sollividava"	Jassie Gift	D. Sathyaprakash
2017	Puriyatha Puthir	"Vellai Kanavu"	Sam C. S.	Hariharan
2017	Kadhal Kasukuthaiya	"Hello Arjun"	Dharan	
2017	Spyder	"Aali Aali"	Harris Jayaraj	Brijesh Shandilya, Sunitha Upadrashta
2019	100% Kadhal	"Thiru Thiru Ganatha"	G. V. Prakash Kumar	
2020	Silence	"Pudhu Unarve"	Gopi Sundar	Karthik
2022	Pottu Vaiththaan (album song)	"Pottu Vaiththaan"	Maha	Tippu
2023	Ponniyin Selvan: II	"Veera Raja Veera"	A. R. Rahman	K. S. Chithra, Shankar Mahadevan
2023	Ponniyin Selvan: II	"Aazhi Mazhai Kanna"	A. R. Rahman	
2023	Annapoorani: The Goddess of Food	"Ulagai Vella Pogiraal"	S. Thaman	
2026	Baththa	"Magale"	Sai Abhyankkar	Sai Abhyankkar
2026	Om	"Senjudare"	Sai Abhyankkar	Sai Abhyankkar

=== Telugu ===
Year	Film	Song	Composer(s)	Note(s)
1995	Indira (D)	"Laali Laali Anu"(Female)	A. R. Rahman	
1996	Bharatheeyudu (D)	"Telephone Dwanila"	A. R. Rahman	
1997	Iddaru (D)	"Hello Mister"	A. R. Rahman	
1997	Ullaasam (D)	"Chalore Choo"	Karthik Raja	
1997	Ullaasam (D)	"Kondamalli Puvve"	Karthik Raja	
1997	Ullaasam (D)	"Veeche Gaalu"	Karthik Raja	
1997	Mukha Mukhi (D)	"Akhila Akhila"	Deva	
1997	Mukha Mukhi (D)	"Manavi Alakin"(Female)	Deva	
1997	Mukha Mukhi (D)	"Mathi Poyene"	Deva	
1997	Rakshakudu (D)	"Soniya Soniya"	A. R. Rahman	
1998	Aahaa	"Ahwanamandhi Andham"	Vandemataram Srinivas	
1998	Jeans (D)	"Raave Naa Cheliya"	A. R. Rahman	
1998	Suprabhatam	"Kanna Nee Kanulaku"	Vandemataram Srinivas	K. S. Chithra
1999	Narasimha (D)	"Chuttu Chutti"	A. R. Rahman	
1999	Iddaru Mitrulu	"Chang Chang"	Mani Sharma	
1999	Krishna Babu	"Hello Miss"	Koti	
1999	Vaalee (D)	"April Masamlo"	Deva	
1999	Ravoyi Chandamama	"Nandha Nandhaanaa"	Mani Sharma	
1999	Premante Pranamistha (D)	"Allukummadhi Jallumannadhi"	A. R. Rahman	
1999	Oke Okkadu (D)	"Andhala Rakshashive"	A. R. Rahman	
2000	Annayya	"Himaseemallo"	Mani Sharma	
2000	Kshemamga Velli Labhamga Randi	"Okkari Kosam"	Vandemataram Srinivas	
2000	Sakhi (D)	"Alaipongeraa"	A. R. Rahman	
2000	Bagunnaara	"O Priyathama"	Deva	
2000	Manasichanu	"Venditherakee"	Sathya	
2000	Rayalaseema Ramanna Chowdary	"Allade Allade"	Mani Sharma	
2000	Sakutumba Saparivaara Sametam	"Love Is The Feeling"	S. V. Krishna Reddy	
2001	Narasimha Naidu	"Lux Paapa"	Mani Sharma	
2001	Murari	"Ekkada Ekkada"	Mani Sharma	
2001	Priyamaina Neeku	"Nachhenuraa"	Shiva Shankar	
2001	Cheli (D)	"Ningiki Jabili"	Harris Jayaraj	
2001	Deevinchandi	"Sandhya Raagaamlo"	S. A. Rajkumar	
2001	Akka Bavekkada	"Vammo Entha Speedo"	S. A. Rajkumar	
2001	Orey Thammudu	"Maridee Maa Lakshmi"	Vandemataram Srinivas	
2001	Kushi	"Cheliya Cheliya"	Mani Sharma	
2001	Prematho Raa	"Emaindho Emo"	Mani Sharma	
2001	Pandanti Samsaram	"Hello Na Cheli"	Vandemataram Srinivas	
2001	Ninnu Choodalani	"Emayyindho Emogani"	S. A. Rajkumar	
2001	Bava Nachadu	"Akka Baava"	M. M. Keeravani	
2001	Bava Nachadu	"Chandamama"	M. M. Keeravani	
2001	Subhakaryam	"Manasu Dochi"	S. A. Rajkumar	
2001	Akasa Veedhilo	"Vennello Aadapillaa"	M. M. Keeravani	
2001	Cheppalani Vundhi	"Ku Ku Ku"	Mani Sharma	
2001	Naalo Unna Prema	"Gopala Kriahnudamma"	Koti	S. P. Balasubrahmanyam
2001	Nuvvu Naaku Nachav	"Unna Maata Cheppaneevu"	Koti	
2001	Chiranjeevulu	"Kanne Vedi Pilla"	AB Murali	
2001	Dumm Dumm Dumm	"Atagadosthada"	Karthik Raja	
2001	Dumm Dumm Dumm	"Hattiti Bittri"	Karthik Raja	
2001	Idhe Naa Modati Prema Lekha	"Maadhamaasa Velaa"	Ghantadi Krishna	
2001	Ammaye Navvithe	"Kokkoo Kodi Petta"	M. M. Srilekha	
2001	Paravasam (D)	"Akasharaalu Rendaina"	A. R. Rahman	
2001	Abhay (D)	"Navvu Navvu"	Shankar–Ehsaan–Loy	
2001	Abhay (D)	"Nuvvu Evaro"	Shankar–Ehsaan–Loy	
2001	Andham	"Manasuloni"	Ghantadi Krishna	
2002	Premaku Swagatam	"Rangula Rekka"	S. V. Krishna Reddy	
2002	Neethone Vuntanu	"Valapula Malle"	Vandemataram Srinivas	
2002	Kalusukovalani	"Tala Talamani"	Devi Sri Prasad	
2002	Nee Thodu Kavali	"Kalalo Kalane Kannaanu"	Valisha Sandeep	
2002	Hai	"Manasurukode"	Koti	
2002	Adrustam	"Moraakko"	Dhina	
2002	Manamiddaram	"Bhale Matthga Vundhi"	Koti	
2002	Rendu Gundela Chappudu	"Kallalona Kallu"	Aaksah	
2002	Rendu Gundela Chappudu	"Oka Sari Moda"	Aaksah	
2003	Tholi Choopulone	"Pagadala Pedala Paina"	Chakri	
2003	Abhimanyu	"TV Lantidhira"	Mani Sharma	
2003	Villain	"Hello Hello Maahashaya"	Vidyasagar	
2003	Swamy IPS (D)	"Edhalona Edha"	Harris Jayaraj	
2004	Naani	"Vastha Nee Venuka"	A. R. Rahman	
2004	Gharshana	"Andhagaada"	Harris Jayaraj	
2004	Intlo Srimathi Veedhilo Kumari	"Premannadhi"	Ghantadi Krishna	
2004	Arjun	"Madhura Madhurathara"	Mani Sharma	
2004	Gudumba Shankar	"Emantaaro"	Mani Sharma	
2004	Judgement (D)	"Iruvadi Vayasu"	Harris Jayaraj	
2004	Mourya (D)	"Addirabbanna"	Vidyasagar	
2005	Oka Oorilo	"Guduu Guduu Guncham"	Devi Sri Prasad	
2005	Aparichithudu (D)	"O Sukumaari"	Harris Jayaraj	
2005	Aparichithudu (D)	"Jiyyangari Inti"	Harris Jayaraj	K. J. Yesudas
2005	Kanchanamala Cable TV	"Kallo Kaveri Raagam"	K. M. Radha Krishnan	
2005	Premikulu	"Nuvvu Choose Choopu"	Sajan Madhav	
2005	Andhari Kosam	"Omkaarama"	Pramod Sharma	
2005	Majaa (D)	"Chi Chi Chi"	Vidyasagar	
2005	Whistles	"Vaddantaana Ninne"	Ramana Ogeti	
2005	News	"Monalisa Monaalishaa"	Gurukiran	
2005	Preminchi Choodu	Sodhinchuko"	Harris Jayaraj	
2005	Shivapuram	"Minnagu Vanti"	M. G. Radhakrishnan	
2005	Shivapuram	"Pachani Thota"	M. G. Radhakrishnan	
2006	Chukkallo Chandrudu	"Kalanainaa"	Chakri	
2006	Naidu LLB	"Nuvve Nuvve"	S. A. Rajkumar	
2006	Iddaru Attala Muddula Alludu	"Tik Tik Tik"	Prasad	
2006	Maha	"Akurale Kalam"	Yuvan Shankar Raja	
2006	10th Class	"O Premaa"	Mickey J. Meyer	
2006	Parinayam	"Parichayam"	Ravindra Jain	
2006	Parinayam	"Manaasune"	Ravindra Jain	
2006	Gaana	"Chilaka Gorink"	Vandemataram Srinivas	
2006	Sainikudu	"Oorughalluke Pilla"	Harris Jayaraj	
2007	Neevalle Neevalle	"Neevalle Nee"	Harris Jayaraj	
2007	Veduka	"Navve Navve"	Anup Rubens	
2008	Bheema	"Kanu Chupula"	Harris Jayaraj	
2008	Ardham Chesukoru	"Iruvuri Manasulo"	Ravi Mulakalapalli	
2008	Brahmanandam Drama Company	"Mellagaa"	Sai Karthik	
2008	Hare Ram	"Laalijo"	Mickey J. Meyer	
2008	Ullasamga Utsahamga	"Naa Prema"	G. V. Prakash Kumar	
2008	Kalyanam	"Ninnu Choosthe"	Kanakesh Rathod	
2008	Nenu Meeku Telusa	"Yenno Yenno"	Achu Rajamani	
2008	Yuvatha	"Yevarunnarani Neekaina"	Mani Sharma	
2008	Ankusam	"Chi Chi Pora"	Mariya Manohar	
2009	Bendu Apparao R.M.P	"Em Roopura Ori Naayana"	Koti	
2009	Bendu Apparao R.M.P	"Adhire Adharama"	Koti	
2010	Baava	"Mila Mila"	Chakri	
2010	Puli	"Nammakam Iyyara Swamy"	A. R. Rahman	
2011	100% Love	"Thiru Thiru Gananaadha"	Devi Sri Prasad	
2011	Journey	"Chitti Chitti Pulakintha"	C. Sathya	
2011	Nagaram Nidrapotunna Vela	"Ekkadi Dakka"	Yasho Krishna	
2012	Bodyguard	"Jiyajaley"	S. Thaman	
2012	Brothers	"Rani Nanne"	Harris Jayaraj	
2012	Damarukam	"Nesthama Nesthama"	Devi Sri Prasad	
2012	Eka Veera	"Yelo Yelo Vennela"	Karthik	
2012	Ko Antey Koti	"Bangaru Konda"	Shakthikanth Karthik	
2012	Nippu	"Oy Pilla"	S. Thaman	
2013	Kadali (D)	"Pachchani Thota"	A. R. Rahman	
2014	Alludu Seenu	"Neeli Neeli"	Devi Sri Prasad	
2014	Geethanjali	"Naa Manasuni Thaakey"	Praveen Lakkaraju	
2014	Legend	"Thanjavuru"	Devi Sri Prasad	
2014	Seenugaadi Love Story (D)	"Nuvve Nuvve"	Harris Jayaraj	
2015	Anekudu (D)	"Ee Sinni Sinnaari"	Harris Jayaraj	
2015	Yevade Subramanyam	"O Kala"	Radhan	
2017	Spyder	"Haali Haali"	Harris Jayaraj	
2018	Antariksham 9000 KMPH	"Samayama"	Prashanth R Vihari	
2020	Nishabdham	"Madhuramithe"	Gopi Sundar	
2022	Kothala Rayudu	"O Thalapai"	Sunil Kashyap	
2025	Oh Bhama Ayyo Rama	"Ramachandhrude"	Radhan	Tippu

=== Hindi/Malayalam/Kannada ===
Year	Film	Song	Language	Composer	Co-singer(s)
1995	Priyanka (D)	"Khili Chandne Hame"	Hindi	A. R. Rahman	
2000	Mister Butler	"Muthaaram Muthunde"	Malayalam	Vidyasagar	M. G. Sreekumar
2000	Mr. Kokila	"Jee Jinke Jigiyo Jinke"	Kannada	Iyer Selvam	
2001	Bahala Chennagide	"Kanda Odane"	Kannada	Koti	S. P. Balasubrahmanyam
2001	Bahala Chennagide	Chori Chori	Kannada	Koti	Devan Ekambaram
2002	Sundara Kaanda	"Maina Maina"	Kannada	M. M. Keeravani	Udit Narayan
2002	Sundara Kaanda	"Are Jumma Jummalakka"	Kannada	M. M. Keeravani	S. P. Balasubrahmanyam
2004	Nalla	"Gup Shup"	Kannada	Venkat-Narayan	Unnikrishnan
2006	Aparichit (D)	"Iyengar Ghar Ki Sajni"	Hindi	Harris Jayaraj	Hariharan
2007	Sainika	"Male Bille Male Bille"	Kannada	Deva	
2007	Preethigaagi	"Preethiyalli Aralide"	Kannada	S. A. Rajkumar	
2008	Auto	"Doora Doorake"	Kannada	Vijayakrishna	Harish Raghavendra
2008	Nanda Loves Nanditha	"Pachhegili Henne"	Kannada	Emil	Tippu
2009	Love Guru	"Ondondu Storygu"	Kannada	Joshua Sridhar	Krish, Suchitra
2009	Preethi Nee Shashwathana	"Nooru Nooru Premigalalli"	Kannada	K. Kalyan	Udit Narayan
2010	Parole	"Yaako Yeno Nanage"	Kannada	Balaji K. Mithran	Harish Raghavendra, Tippu
2010	Nirdoshi	"Ee Dina"	Kannada	Govardhan	Tippu
2013	Pattam Pole	"Antha Naalil"	Malayalam	M. Jayachandran	Madhu Balakrishnan
2016	Kolar	"Ele Eleya Manase"	Kannada	B. R. Hemanth Kumar	
2017	Prema Baraha	"Manase Manase"	Kannada	Jassie Gift	M. M. Keeravani

== Television songs ==
- Punnagai - 1997
- Kolangal - 2003
- Hello Shyamala- 2018

== Awards and recognitions ==
Harini has been the recipient of several popular awards in the singing category. Some of her awards are as listed below:

- 2003 – Tamil Nadu State Film Award for Best Female Playback for Aalanguyil (Parthiban Kanavu)
- 1997 – Tamil Nadu State Film Award for Best Female Playback for Manam Virumbuthe (Nerukku Ner)
- 2004 – ITFA Best Female Playback Award
- 2000 – Silver Screen MGR Award (in Singapore)
- 1999 – Pace Award
- 1998 – Roja Award
- 1997 – Madras Cultural Academy Awards
