= Good Boy (2005 film) =

- VCD cover
- Directed by: G. Nageswara Reddy
- Written by: G. Nageswara Reddy
- Dialogue by: Marudhuri Raja
- Produced by: K Paidi Babu; Kamagari Sunil Kumar Reddy; V. Jagadish (presents)
- Starring: Rohit; Navneet Kaur
- Cinematography: S. Arun Kumar
- Edited by: K. Ram Gopal Reddy
- Music by: Vandemataram Srinivas
- Production company: Madhura Meenakshi Movies
- Release date: 22 September 2005
- Running time: 123 minutes
- Country: India
- Language: Telugu

Good Boy is a 2005 Indian Telugu-language romantic drama film directed by G. Nageswara Reddy and starring Rohit and Navneet Kaur with L. B. Sriram and Rajyalakshmi in supporting roles. The film was released to mixed-to-negative reviews.

== Cast ==
- Rohit as Vamsi
- Navneet Kaur as Krishna Veni
- L. B. Sriram as Vamsi's father
- Rajyalakshmi as Vamsi's mother
- Chalapathi Rao
- Apoorva
- Venu Madhav
- Dharmavarapu Subramanyam
- Brahmanandam
- Posani Krishna Murali
- Babloo as Vamsi's friend
- Sekhar
- Naveen

== Production ==
This film marks the fourth collaboration between G. Nageswara Reddy and Rohit after 6 Teens (2001), Girl Friend (2002), and Nenu Seetamahalakshmi (2003). Filming began on 15 April 2003 at the Telangana State Police Academy (formerly known as Andhra Pradesh Police Academy). A song was shot at Ramoji Film City on 13 July 2005. The dialogue portions of the film were completed as of 14 July 2005. The song "Tholisari Tholakarila" was shot at a village situated at ICRISAT, Mumbai.

== Soundtrack ==
The music was composed by Vandemataram Srinivas. The songs were released under the Madhura Audio label.

Track listing
No.	Title	Singer(s)	Length
1.	"Ello Maruthi"	Chakri, Ganga	5:02
2.	"Namo Namo Venkatesha"	Udit Narayan, Usha	4:56
3.	"Manaspoortyga"	R. P. Patnaik, Usha	5:48
4.	"Preminchavepilla"	Mallikarjun, Usha	5:41
5.	"Tholisari Tholakarila"	P. Unnikrishnan, M. M. Srilekha	5:13
6.	"Malle Mogga"	Ravi Verma, Kousalya	5:14
Total length:			31:54

== Release and reception ==
The film was initially scheduled to release in mid-July.

Jeevi of Idlebrain.com rated the film three out of five and wrote that "The entertainment value this film provides can compensate the fallibility in the second half. On a whole, this film is passable".
