= Maa Annayya Bangaram =

- Directed by: Jonnalagadda Srinivas
- Written by: Paruchuri brothers
- Story by: Bhupathi Raja
- Produced by: Natti Kumar
- Starring: Rajasekhar; Kamalini Mukharjee
- Cinematography: D Prasad Babu
- Edited by: Gautham Raju
- Music by: S. A. Rajkumar
- Production company: Vishaka Talkies
- Release date: 31 July 2010
- Running time: 151 minutes
- Country: India
- Language: Telugu

Maa Annayya Bangaram (transl. My golden elder brother) is 2010 Indian Telugu-language family drama film, produced by Natti Kumar on Vishaka Talkies banner directed by Jonnalagadda Srinivas. Starring Rajashekar, Kamalinee Mukherjee and music composed by S. A. Rajkumar.

== Cast ==
- Rajasekhar as Sivaji
- Kamalinee Mukherjee as Manjula
- Rohit as Bhargav, Sivaji's brother
- Aditya Om as Akash, Sivaji’s brother
- Yashwanth as Sivaji's brother
- Raj Kalyan as Sivaji's brother
- Ping Pong Surya as Sivaji's brother
- Master Bharath as Mahesh, Sivaji’s brother
- Brahmanandam as a thief
- Jaya Prakash Reddy as Parameshwar Rao, Sivaji’s uncle
- Chalapathi Rao
- Raghu Babu as Raghu Sivaji's friend
- Sayaji Shinde as Subba Raidu
- L. B. Sriram
- Surya
- Jhansi as Nandini, Shivaji's sister
- Pavala Syamala
- Rama Prabha
- Uttej
- Suthi Velu
- Gundu Sudarshan

== Production ==
The film was shot in Hyderabad while a few songs were canned in Switzerland. Filming was complete as of mid-2010.

== Soundtrack ==
Maa Annayya Bangaram

Film score by SA Raj Kumar
- Released: 2010
- Genre: Soundtrack
- Length: 29:00
- Label: Shivaranjani Music
- Producer: SA Raj Kumar

SA Raj Kumar chronology
Punnami Naagu (2009)	Maa Annayya Bangaram (2010)	Mouna Raagam (2010)

The music was composed by S. A. Rajkumar and was released on Shivaranjani Music Company.

No.	Title	Singer(s)	Length
1.	"Andham Nee Asalu"	Karthik, Priyadarshini	3:47
2.	"Gitchi Gitchi"	Priya, Saketh	4:14
3.	"Inti Maharani"	Srinivas, Srividhya, Manasa, Murali	4:31
4.	"Mallee Mallee"	Rajesh, Rita	3:29
5.	"Sai Baba"	Tippu	4:17
6.	"Suryunike"	S. P. Balasubrahmanyam, Murali	4:21
Total length:			29:00
