= Nava Vasantham =

- VCD cover
- Directed by: K. Shahjahan
- Based on: Punnagai Desam (Tamil)
- Produced by: R. B. Choudary
- Starring: Tarun; Akash; Rohit; Priyamani; Sunil; Ankita
- Cinematography: R. Madhi
- Edited by: V. Jaishankar
- Music by: S. A. Rajkumar
- Production company: Super Good Films
- Release date: 9 November 2007
- Country: India
- Language: Telugu

Nava Vasantham (transl. New spring) is a 2007 Indian Telugu-language film directed by K. Shahjahan and starring Tarun, Akash, Rohit, Priyamani, Sunil and Ankita. The film is a remake of the director's own Tamil film Punnagai Desam (2002), which also starred Tarun. Despite releasing to mixed reviews, the film was a box office success.

== Plot ==
Ganesh comes from village to meet his uncle and his daughter Ammu. His uncle refuses to acknowledge his presence and does not want his daughter to get married with him. He meets his friends Prasad, Raja, and Vijay who are living in bad conditions and helps them achieve their dreams.

== Cast ==
- Tarun as Ganesh
- Akash as Prasad
- Rohit as Raja
- Priyamani as Anjali aka Ammu
- Sunil as Vijay
- Ankita as Priya
- Kota Srinivasa Rao as House Owner
- Vamsi Krishna as Rajesh
- Ahuti Prasad as Anjali's father
- Sana as Anjali's mother
- Sudha as Ganesh's mother
- L. B. Sriram as Ganesh's father
- Tanikella Bharani as Raja's father
- Telangana Shakuntala as Prasad's step-mother
- Jeeva as Vijay's father
- Babu Mohan
- Visweswara Rao
- Mallikarjuna Rao
- Brahmanandam
- AVS (special appearance in the song "Maa Tholi Patane")

== Soundtrack ==
Music by S. A. Rajkumar. Three songs were reused from the original ("Engal Muchukulle", "Thottu Vidum Thoorathil" and "Kaatrile Paatu Varum" were reused as "Maa Tholi Patane", "Swachamaina", and "Patale Pranami", respectively). The song "Moogamanasey" is based on his own song "Kadhal azhaga" from "Paattali(1999)" Tamil movie.

No.	Title	Singer(s)	Length
1.	"Choosa Choosa"	Udit Narayan, Rita
2.	"Friendshippe Thiyyani"	Tippu, Gopika Poornima, Srinivas
3.	"Moogamanasey"	Hariharan, Sadhana Sargam
4.	"Leliley"	Tippu
5.	"Pataley Pranami"	S. P. Balasubrahmanyam
6.	"Thakadhimi"	Rahul, Rita
7.	"Katha Kadu"	Ranjith
8.	"Maa Tholi Patane"
9.	"Swachamaina"

== Reception ==
A critic from Rediff.com wrote that "Go for Nava Vasantam, it is a paisa-vasool (transl. bang for your buck) flick". A critic from Full Hyderabad wrote that "This remake of Punnagai Desam in Tamil, also starring Tarun, is unlikely to strike a chord with you despite a good storyline, thanks to a sloppy screenplay".
