= RAM (Rapid Action Mission) =

2024 Indian Telugu action film by Mihiraam Vynateya

- Theatrical release poster
- Directed by: Mihiraam Vynateyaa
- Written by: Mihiraam Vynateyaa
- Produced by: Deepikanjali Vadlamani
- Starring: Surya Ayyalasomayajula; Dhanya Balakrishna
- Cinematography: Dhaaran Sukre
- Music by: Aasrith Ayyangar
- Production company: Deepika Entertainment
- Distributed by: O S M Vision
- Release date: 26 January 2024
- Country: India
- Language: Telugu

RAM (Rapid Action Mission) is a 2024 Indian Telugu-language action film directed by Mihiraam Vynateya and starring Surya Ayyalasomayajula in the titular role and Dhanya Balakrishna.

== Plot ==
TBA

== Cast ==
- Surya Ayyalasomayajula as Ram
- Dhanya Balakrishna as Dr.Jahnavi "Pandu", JB's daughter and Ram's love interest
- Bhanu Chander as Jaiprakash Baradwaj (JB)
- P. Sai Kumar as Riyaz Ahmad HID chief
- Rohit as Major Surya Prakash (Cameo Appearance)
- Subhalekha Sudhakar
- Ravi Varma as Nawaz/A.Srivastav, a terrorist disguised in HID officer.
- Meena Vasu
- Amit Tiwari as Wasim Zafar
- Mahaboob Bhasha as "Athi" Sundar, Ram's best friend
- Kishore Kumar Polimera as Ajju

== Soundtrack ==
The soundtrack was composed by Aasrith Ayyangar.

All lyrics are written by Ramu Kumar A. S. K.

Track listing
No.	Title	Singer(s)	Length
1.	"Manthoni Kadu Ra Bhai"	Dhanunjay	3:17
2.	"Brave Hearts"	Rahul Sipligunj	4:27
3.	"Brave Hearts Rap Version"	Ramu Kumar A. S. K.	4:09
Total length:			11:53

== Reception ==
A critic from Deccan Chronicle rated the film 2 1/2 out of 5 and wrote that "While the film adheres to certain action genre tropes, its strength lies in the emotional depth and character development, making RAM a noteworthy addition to the cinematic landscape". A critic from Sakshi gave the film the same rating and praised the cast and crew. A critic from The Hans India wrote that "On a whole, RAM (Rapid Action Mission) stands as a commendable addition to the action genre, presenting a harmonious mix of adrenaline-fueled sequences and poignant moments. The film's strength lies in its robust lead performance, supported by a talented cast and skillful direction".
