= Vizag Prasad =

Telugu film and theatre actor

- Born: Korlam Parvathi Varaprasada Rao
- Occupation: Actor
- Years active: 1981-2018

Korlam Parvathi Varaprasada Rao, better known by his stage name Vizag Prasad, was an Indian actor known for his work in Telugu cinema and theatre, particularly in negative and character roles. He made his film debut with Babai Abbai (1985), directed by Jandhyala, and went on to appear in over 170 films and 700 plays throughout his career.

== Career ==
Korlam Parvathi Varaprasada Rao hails from Gopalapatnam, a suburb of Visakhapatnam (Vizag). He began his acting career at the age of 16, performing in numerous plays before transitioning to films.

Babai Abbai (1985), directed by Jandhyala, was his first film. During the making of Mogudu Pellalu (1985), director Jandhyala gave him the stage name "Vizag Prasad" to distinguish him from other actors named Prasad in the film. The name "Vizag Prasad" was derived from his native place, Gopalapuram, a suburb of Vizag. Until the release of Nuvvu Nenu, he was credited as "K. P. V. Prasad" in his films. However, during the shooting of Nuvvu Nenu, the cast and crew referred to him as "Vizag" Prasad, and the name was later used in the film's title credits.

After a hiatus, he garnered acclaim for his role as Uday Kiran's father in Nuvvu Nenu in 2001. Nuvvu Nenu enabled him to be a viable supporting actor and he starred in Sundara Kanda, Allari Ramudu, Bhadra, Allari Bullodu, Gemeni, and Jai Chiranjeeva. He also acted in a few Tamil films.

== Death ==
He died in 2018 due to cardiac arrest.

== Plays ==
He acted in over 700 plays including:

- Appu Patram
- Bhale Pelli
- Bhajantreelu
- Kaala Dharmam

== Filmography ==
- Note: All films are in Telugu, unless otherwise noted.

Year	Film	Role	Notes	Ref.
1985	Babai Abbai	Inspector Shyam Sundar		
1985	Mogudu Pellalu			
1985	Pratighatana			
1987	Sruthilayalu			
1992	Swathi Kiranam			
1992	Sundarakanda			
1993	Prema Pusthakam			
2001	Nuvvu Nenu	Rajendra		
2002	Nee Premakai			
2002	Malli Malli Chudali	Jagadish Prasad		
2002	Allari Ramudu	Chandra Shekhar		
2002	Nee Thodu Kavali			
2002	Chennakesava Reddy	Police Commissioner Prasad		
2002	Gemeni	Kandula Satyam		
2002	Ninu Choodaka Nenundalenu			
2002	Kalusukovalani	Anjali's father		
2002	Vachina Vaadu Suryudu	Ramanatham		
2002	Siva Rama Raju	M.P.		
2003	Juniors	Pooja's father		
2003	Idi Maa Ashokgadi Love Story			
2003	Appudappudu			
2003	Anaganaga O Kurraadu	G.K. Naidu		
2003	Janaki Weds Sriram	College Principal		
2003	Raghavendra	C.I.		
2004	Kedi No. 1			
2004	Gowri	Chandra Shekhar		
2004	Gudumba Shankar			
2004	Pedababu	M.P.		
2005	Athanokkade	Minister		
2005	Bhadra			
2005	Political Rowdy			
2005	Alex			
2005	Allari Bullodu	Madhava Rao		
2005	Jai Chiranjeeva	Dr. M. V. Shankara Rao		
2006	Shock	Madhu's father		
2006	Raam			
2006	Boys and Girls		Tamil film	
2008	Sundarakanda	Bhushanam		
2008	Adivishnu			
2008	Ninna Nedu Repu	Swapna's father	Tamil film	
2009	Fitting Master			
2009	Bangaru Babu			
2013	Masala	Judge		
2014	Pilla Nuvvu Leni Jeevitham	MLA		
2015	Lion			
2016	Rani Gari Bangla			
2017	Lovers Club			
2017	Idhi Maa Prema Katha			
2018	Officer	Producer	Cameo appearance	

=== Television ===
Year	Title	Role	Notes	Ref.
1995-97	Lady Detective		Episodic Role (Episode 46)	
