= Keelu Gurram (2005 film) =

- DVD cover
- Directed by: Kodi Ramakrishna
- Story by: Saichandra Creations Unit
- Dialogue by: Thotapalli Madhu
- Produced by: Sama Mahipal Reddy; Sama Tirumala Reddy; Sama Malla Reddy
- Starring: Rohit; Baladitya; Nakul; Satyam Rajesh; Tanu Roy
- Cinematography: Kodi Lakshman
- Music by: S. A. Rajkumar
- Production company: Saichandra Creations
- Release date: 4 February 2005
- Country: India
- Language: Telugu

Keelu Gurram (transl. Magical horse) is a 2005 Indian Telugu-language film directed by Kodi Ramakrishna and starring Rohit, Baladitya, Nakul, Satyam Rajesh and Tanu Roy. The film was released to negative reviews.

== Cast ==
- Rohit as Charan
- Baladitya as Chantigadu
- Nakul as Bala Bheema
- Satyam Rajesh
- Tanu Roy as Rajani
- Swapna Madhuri
- Apoorva
- Ravali
- Babloo Prithiveeraj as Sadhu
- Sivaji Raja as Pinni
- Gautam Raju
- Brahmanandam
- Shakeela
- Babu Mohan as Lawyer

== Soundtrack ==
The soundtrack was composed by S. A. Rajkumar. The song "Aa Keelu Gurramla" is reused from Rajkumar's own Tamil composition "June July" from Priyamaanavale (2000).

All lyrics are written by Sai Sri Harsha.

Track listing
No.	Title	Singer(s)	Length
1.	"Aa Keelu Gurramla"	Rajesh, Malathi	4:25
2.	"Chal Chal Gurram"	Tippu	4:38
3.	"Kiss Kiss Kiss"	Kalpana Raghavendar	4:04
4.	"Ko Ko Ko Koyila"	Rajesh, Mathangi	4:14
5.	"Sari Sari Gama"	Mano, Malathi, Sujatha Mohan	4:45
Total length:			22:06

== Release and reception ==
The film was released on 4 February 2005 alongside 786 Khaidi Premakatha and Arey, and it was a box office failure.

Jeevi of Idlebrain.com rated the film one out of five and wrote that "Kodi Rama Krishna disappoints the Telugu film lovers with Keelu Gurram". Gudipoodi Srihari of The Hindu wrote that "The name of the movie and that of the director, Kodi Ramakrishna, are enough to draw the audience to the theatre. But the hope of a promising entertainment diminishes as we watch a routine drama of love between two childhood friends".
