= Nenu Seetamahalakshmi =

- DVD cover
- Directed by: G. Nageswara Reddy
- Screenplay by: G. Nageswara Reddy
- Story by: G. Nageswara Reddy
- Produced by: Valluripalli Ramesh Babu
- Dialogue by: Satish Vegesna
- Starring: Rohit; Sravya
- Cinematography: Bhupati
- Edited by: Basva Paidireddy
- Music by: Chakri
- Production company: Maharshi Cinema
- Release date: 8 November 2003
- Country: India
- Language: Telugu

Nenu Seetamahalakshmi (transl. I, Seetamahalakshmi) is a 2003 Indian Telugu-language romantic drama film directed by G. Nageswara Reddy starring Rohit and newcomer Sravya. The film was released to mixed-to-negative reviews and failed at the box office.

== Plot ==
Naani and Seetamahalakshmi are in love and run away to Visakhapatnam. They realize that they are not made each other and go back to their respective houses in Hyderabad. After realizing that they can't stay apart for a few days, they try to reunite. How they reunite forms the rest of the story.

== Cast ==
- Rohit as Naani
- Sravya as Seetamahalakshmi
- Chalapathi Rao
- Surya
- Delhi Rajeswari
- Apoorva
- Brahmanandam
- Kondavalasa
- M. S. Narayana
- Krishna Bhagavaan
- Raghu Babu
- Pawan
- Basha
- Gundu Hanumantha Rao
- Jr. Relangi

== Production ==
This film marks the third collaboration between G. Nageswara Reddy and Rohit after 6 Teens (2001) and Girl Friend (2002).

== Soundtrack ==
The soundtrack for the film was composed by Chakri and it was released under the audio label of Aditya Music. The audio release function took place on 8 October 2003 with N. T. Rama Rao Jr. as the chief guest.

Track listing
No.	Title	Lyrics	Singer(s)	Length
1.	"Kannulu Moste"	Bhaskara Bhatla	Sandeep Bhaumik, Kousalya	4:39
2.	"Anaganaga"	Kandikonda	S. P. Balasubrahmanyam, Kousalya	4:21
3.	"Aakasama"	Kandikonda	M. M. Keeravani	5:26
4.	"Muddu Muddu"	Sai Sri Harsha	Sri Raghukunche, Kousalya	5:17
5.	"Kotipalli"	Kandikonda	Vasu, Kousalya	4:51
6.	"Nuvvena Nuvvena"	Srinivas	Chakri, Kousalya	7:37
Total length:				36:37

== Reception ==
Jeevi of Idlebrain.com rated the film 2 3/4 out of 5 and wrote that "The director tried to narrate the film in comedy format, but failed to generate rib-tickling humor". Similarly, a critic from Sify wrote that "here the director is confused whether to make it a love story or a comedy caper."

== Box office ==
The film was a box office failure causing Sravya to revert to her birthname Neetha.
