= Neethone Vuntanu =

2002 film

- Film poster
- Directed by: T Prabhakar
- Written by: T Prabhakar (screenplay); Marudhuri Raja (dialogues)
- Produced by: P Purushottama Rao
- Starring: Upendra, Rachana, Sanghavi
- Cinematography: Vasu
- Music by: Vandemataram Srinivas
- Production company: Lakshmi Art Pictures
- Release date: 1 February 2002
- Running time: 129 minutes
- Country: India
- Language: Telugu

Neethone Vuntanu (transl. I will be with you) is a 2002 Indian Telugu-language romantic drama film directed by T. Prabhakar and starring Upendra, Rachana, and Sanghavi in the lead roles. The film's title is based on a song from Zamindar (1965).

== Cast ==
- Upendra as Ravi
- Rachana as Aparna/Subbalakshmi
- Sanghavi as Divya
- Thriller Manju
- Sudhakar
- Tanikella Bharani
- Subbaraya Sharma
- Siva Parvathi

== Soundtrack ==
The songs were composed by Vandemataram Srinivas.

Song title	Singers
" Pongi Pongi"	P. Unnikrishnan, Swarnalatha
"Valapula Malle "	Rajesh Krishnan, Harini
"Merisay Nee"	Udit Narayan
"Jallo Vaanajallo "	Unnimenon, Swarnalatha
"Handsome "	Kavita Krishnamurti

== Release ==
Gudipoodi Srihari of The Hindu wrote that "The film is interesting as long as the hide and seeks game goes on". Jeevi of Idlebrain gave the film a rating of two and a half out of five and wrote that " The story of the film is novel. But bad screenplay and direction misuses the novel storyline".
