= Anaganaga O Kurraadu =

2003 Telugu film

- Official poster
- Directed by: L P Ramarao
- Written by: Kona Venkat (dialogues)
- Screenplay by: Kona Venkat
- Story by: Puri Jagannadh
- Produced by: Katta Rambabu
- Starring: Rohit; Rekha
- Cinematography: VSR Swamy
- Edited by: Marthand K. Venkatesh
- Music by: Chakri
- Production company: Sai Ooha Creations
- Release date: 15 August 2003
- Country: India
- Language: Telugu

Anaganaga O Kurraadu (transl. Once upon a boy) is a 2003 Indian Telugu-language romantic drama film directed by L P Ramarao and starring Rohit and Rekha. The film reuses has scenes inspired from Bend It Like Beckham (2002).

== Cast ==
- Rohit as Sachin
- Rekha as Rekha
- Banerjee as Vithal Rao
- Rajeev Kanakala as Rajeev
- Vizag Prasad as G. K. Naidu
- Devadas Kanakala as Rajeev's father
- Chalapati Rao as Driver
- Dharmavarapu Subrahmanyam
- Gundu Hanumantha Rao
- Sangeetha
- M. Balayya
- Kadambari Kiran
- Venkatapathy Raju as a selection committee member (special appearance)
- Mohammed Azharuddin as himself (special appearance)

== Production ==
Director LP Rama Rao previously worked under Puri Jagannadh. Most of the film completed shooting by the end of 2002 sans three songs, which were to be shot in Malaysia and Singapore.

== Soundtrack ==
The music was composed by Chakri.

Track listing
No.	Title	Singer(s)	Length
1.	"Vijayam Mana Sontham"	Tippu, Anuradha Sriram	4:17
2.	"Cell Phone Dwani"	Chakri, Gopika Poornima	5:28
3.	"Kala Teravarindi"	Kousalya	4:34
4.	"Nene Nuvvani"	Kousalya, Venu	4:25
5.	"Sakku Sakku"	Raghu Kunche, Sunitha	4:39
6.	"Chinna Dressulo"	Ravi Varma, Sudha	5:14
Total length:			28:37

== Reception ==
Gudipoodi Srihari of The Hindu opined that "The narration becomes interesting only when it is deals with cricket". A critic from Sify wrote that "The film is made against the cricket background but comes a cropper as director Rama Rao fails to keep the tempo going". Jeevi of Idlebrain.com stated that "But the director failed to cash on the cricketing scenes in this film though the entire film revolves around cricket".
