= Budget Padmanabham =

2001 film by S. V. Krishna Reddy

- VCD Cover
- Directed by: S. V. Krishna Reddy
- Written by: Diwakar Babu (dialogues)
- Screenplay by: S. V. Krishna Reddy
- Story by: G. Arunachalam
- Based on: Budget Padmanabhan (2000)
- Produced by: Grandi Narayana Rao (Babji)
- Starring: Jagapathi Babu; Ramya Krishna; Ravi Teja
- Cinematography: Sarath
- Edited by: Nandamuri Hari
- Music by: S. V. Krishna Reddy
- Production company: Sri Dhanalakshmi Films
- Release date: 9 March 2001
- Running time: 151 minutes
- Country: India
- Language: Telugu

Budget Padmanabham is a 2001 Indian Telugu-language comedy film, produced by Grandi Narayana Rao under the Sri Dhanalakshmi Films banner and directed by S. V. Krishna Reddy. The film is a remake of the Tamil movie Budget Padmanabhan (2000). It stars Jagapathi Babu, Ramya Krishna (reprising her role from original), and Ravi Teja with music composed by S. V. Krishna Reddy.

== Cast ==
- Jagapati Babu as Padmanabham
- Ramya Krishna as Ramya
- Ravi Teja as Ravi
- Vidya Rao as Sonali
- Tanikella Bharani as Money lender
- Ahuti Prasad as Padmanabham's father
- Rallapalli as Lawyer
- M. S. Narayana as Padmanabham's colleague
- L. B. Sriram as Vaastu Totti Subrahmanyam
- Y. Vijaya as Vijaya
- Chitti Babu as Parrot Astrologer
- Jenny as Subrahmanyam's house owner
- Anil as Anil
- Vallabhaneni Janardhan as Padmanabham's boss
- Gautam Raju as Idlywala
- Namala Murthy as Ramaiah
- Madhuvani
- Rajitha
- Sailaja

== Soundtrack ==
Music composed by S. V. Krishna Reddy. Lyrics written by Chandrabose. Music released on Supreme Music Company.

No.	Title	Singer(s)	Length
1.	"Monalissa Monalissa"	Ravi Varma, Usha	5:10
2.	"Bava Bava"	S. P. Balasubrahmanyam, Unni Krishnan	5:12
3.	"Padakintlo Ee Kshanam"	Pankaj Udas, Nitya Santhoshini	5:09
4.	"Sommutha Aadaa Cheyyara"	S. P. Balasubrahmanyam	4:09
5.	"Evaremi Anukunna"	S. P. Balasubrahmanyam	4:56
Total length:			24:36
