= Nee Thodu Kavali =

- Directed by: Bhimaneni Srinivasa Rao
- Written by: Bhimaneni Srinivasa Rao
- Produced by: Bhimaneni Srinivasa Rao
- Starring: Deepak; Charmi; Rimi Sen
- Music by: Valisha Baabji; Sandeep
- Production company: Sampada Creation
- Release date: 28 March 2002
- Country: India
- Language: Telugu

Nee Thodu Kavali (Telugu: నీ తోడు కావాలి) (transl. I need your company) is a 2002 Indian Telugu romantic drama written, directed and produced by Bhimaneni Srinivasa Rao under Sampada Creation. Deepak, Charmi (in her film debut) and Rimi Sen played the lead roles. The film, which was a box office failure, is inspired by Return to Me (2000).

== Cast ==
- Deepak as Vaasu
- Charmi as Manasa
- Rimi Sen as Sindhu
- Anuradha Pradhan
- Ramaprabha
- Jahnavi
- Vizag Prasad
- Radhaiah
- Deep Singh
- Gautham Raju
- Chitram Srinu
- Vinay Varma
- Baby Hasna

== Production ==
This is Bhimaneni Srinivasa Rao's only film that was not remade from an Indian film but was a remake of a Hollywood film. While in Mumbai, Charmi was spotted and she subsequently made her film debut at the age of 13. The film crew wanted to shoot songs in New Zealand, but her visa was rejected due to her age. Rimi Sen made her Telugu debut through this film.

== Soundtrack ==
The songs are composed by Valisha Baabji and Sandeep.

| No | Song title | Singers | Duration |
|---|---|---|---|
| 1 | "Baalamani" | Udit Narayan, Swarnalatha | 4:38 |
| 2 | "Geetham Sangeetham" | Hariharan, Usha | 5:10 |
| 3 | "Jaanebido" | Sunidhi Chauhan | 4:40 |
| 4 | "Andala Kona" | Valisha Babji | 4:44 |
| 5 | "Neethodu Kavali ( Male )" | Valisha Babji | 1:50 |
| 6 | "Kalalo Kaane" | Valisha Babji, Harini | 5:25 |
| 7 | "Paathikella" | Ravi Varma, Lenina Chowdary | 5:22 |
| 8 | "Swasallo Swasalle" | Valisha Babji | 6:00 |
| 9 | "Neethodu Kavali (Female )" | Sunitha | 1:47 |

== Reception ==
A critic from Idlebrain.com rated the film two out of five stars and wrote that "This film is a badly made one. Only few scenes of the film are interesting. Rest of the film is quite boring".
