= Janaki Weds Sriram =

2003 film

- DVD cover
- Directed by: Anji Srinu
- Written by: Anji Srinu
- Produced by: S. Ramesh Babu
- Starring: Rohit; Gajala; Rekha; Prema
- Cinematography: K. Prasad
- Edited by: K. V. Krishna Reddy
- Music by: Ghantadi Krishna
- Production company: SRB Art Productions
- Release date: 12 September 2003
- Country: India
- Language: Telugu

Janaki Weds Sriram is a 2003 Indian Telugu-language romantic drama film written and directed by Anji Srinu. The film stars Rohit, Gajala, Rekha and Prema while Kaikala Satyanarayana and Ali play supporting roles. Janaki and Sriram are childhood friends who are separated. Sriram later meets Anjali who falls for him but Sriram realizes that he is still in love with Janaki. The film released on 12 September 2003.

== Cast ==
- Rohit as Sriram / Sitaram
- Gajala as Janaki / Sita
- Rekha as Anjali
- Prema as Prema
- Kaikala Satyanarayana as Anjali's grandfather
- Ali as Hyderabad Mikeless Jackson / Vijayawada Shah Rukh Khan Pickpocketer / Tamil Nadu Auto Janiwala
- Ahuti Prasad as Sriram's father
- Chalapathi Rao as Anjali's father
- Narayana Rao
- L. B. Sriram as College Principal
- Sudha as Sriram's mother
- Apoorva as Chamundeshwari
- Deepa
- Vimala Sri
- M. S. Narayana as Vice Principal Ekalingam
- Vizag Prasad as College Principal
- Sudarshan as College Lecturer
- Naveen as Chamundeswari's brother
- Jenny as College Lecturer
- Ananth Babu as College Lecturer

== Soundtrack ==
The soundtrack album consists of 8 singles composed by Ghantadi Krishna. Music was released on Surya Music.

Janaki Weds Sriram (Original Motion Picture Soundtrack)
No.	Title	Lyrics	Singer(s)	Length
1.	"Mera Dil Thujako Diya"	Taidala Bapu	Kumar Sanu, Chorus	4:59
2.	"Pandu Vennelo Ee Venu Gaanam"	Sirivennela Seetharama Sastry	Tina Kamal	5:19
3.	"Rivvuna Egire Guvva"	Chaitanya Prasad	Tippu, Sunitha	4:59
4.	"Andhaala Bhamudu"	Taidala Bapu	Sandeep Banaka, Sunitha, Nishika	5:05
5.	"Ye Doora Theeraralo"	Chaitanya Prasad	Rajesh, Nitya Santoshini	5:07
6.	"Ninnu Yentha Choosina"	Taidala Bapu	Udit Narayan, Tina Kamal	4:23
7.	"Rivvuna Egire Guvva (sad version)"	Sirivennela Seetharama Sastry	S. P. Balasubrahmanyam	5:19
8.	"Eiffel Toweraina"	Taidala Bapu	Shankar Mahadevan, Surekha Murthy	5:38
Total length:				40:49

== Reception ==
In his review for The Hindu, Gudipoodi Srihari called Janaki Weds Sriram a "feel-good story". He wrote that Rohit gave a satisfactory performance but Gazala stole the show. "Flexible that she is an actress, she suits any kind of role". In a more mixed review, Jeevi of Idlebrain.com felt that the story was mix of successful films like Manasantha Nuvve and Nuvve Kavali. He felt that the climax was very cinematic and unconvincing and the film got boring at times. Zamin Ryot's Griddaluru Gopalrao, on the other hand, termed the film "very bad". Gopalrao opined that while story started with an interesting premise, the film lost its steam as it progressed.
