= Chandravamsam =

2002 Indian film

- CD cover
- Directed by: V. Umakant
- Written by: Sri Krishna (dialogues)
- Screenplay by: V. Umakant
- Based on: Habba (1999) by J. K. Bharavi
- Produced by: J. K. Bharavi
- Starring: Krishna; Suman; Naresh; Sivaji; Rohit; Jayaprada; Radhika Varma; Rupa; Sridevi; Eepshitha; Saipriya
- Cinematography: Adusumalli Vijay Kumar
- Edited by: K. Ramesh
- Music by: J. K. Bharavi
- Production company: Raghuramayya Creations
- Release date: 15 February 2002
- Country: India
- Language: Telugu

Chandravamsam (transl. Lunar dynasty) is a 2002 Indian Telugu-language family drama film directed by V. Umakant. The film features an ensemble cast starring Krishna, Suman, Naresh, Sivaji, Rohit, Jayaprada, Radhika Varma, Rupa, Sridevi, Eepshitha and Saipriya.

Chandravamsam is a remake of the Kannada film Habba (1999), which itself is based on the Pandavas and the Virata Parvam from the Mahabharata. The film was released to negative reviews with Krishna's performance considered as the film's saving grace. The film was a box office failure.

== Plot ==
Four of the five brothers are married. When the youngest, Krishna, falls in love with Priya, the others ensure she does not marry him because she is their sister and their late father intended to leave his estate to her children.

== Cast ==
- Krishna as Dharma Raju
- Suman
- Naresh
- Sivaji as Hari Chandra
- Rohit as Krishna
- Jayaprada as Dharma Raju's wife
- Radhika Varma as Hari Chandra's wife
- Rupa
- Sridevi
- Eepshitha
- Saipriya as Rukmini
- Tanikella Bharani
- G. V. Sudhakar Naidu
- Kishore
- Prasanna Kumar
- Surya
- Telangana Shakuntala as Ammagaru
- Shobharani
- Meghana
- Deepa
- Sriharshini
- AVS
- Gundu Hanumantha Rao
- Venu Madhav as Purohit
- Gundu Sudarshan

== Production ==
Kannada director V. Umakant made his Telugu debut with this film. The five brother characters are a modern take on the Pandavas with Krishna, Suman and Rohit's characters based on Dharma Raju, Bhima and Arjuna, respectively. The film was titled Chandravamsam due to the relation between the lunar dynasty and the Pandavas. Rohit accepted the film to learn from senior actors like Krishna. Jayaprada reprised her role from Kannada original. This was her 44th film with Krishna.

== Soundtrack ==
The soundtrack was composed by J. K. Bharavi. The tune of songs "Dhim Thakita" and "Mama Masti" from Kannada film Habba were retained here.

Track listing
No.	Title	Lyrics	Singer(s)	Length
1.	"Poillo Pinnisula"	J. K. Bharavi	Gangadhara Sastry, Chalapathi Raju	5:21
2.	"Entha Mudhu Gunnade"	J. K. Bharavi	Gangadhara Sastry, Mani Nagaraj	4:07
3.	"Dhim Thakita"	Guru Charan	Gangadhara Sastry, Mani Nagaraj	5:00
4.	"Masth Masth Pelli"	S. D. Balu	Gangadhara Sastry, Srikanth, Chalapathi Raju	5:07
5.	"Sensational Family"	Sri Vedavyas	Gangadhara Sastry, Srikanth, Mani Nagaraj	4:10
6.	"Mama Mama Masti"	Kaluva Krishna Sai	Gangadhara Sastry, Mani Nagaraj	4:56
Total length:				28:41

== Reception ==
Jeevi of Idlebrain.com rated the film three out of five and wrote that "It's an average film and Krishna is the strength". On the contrary, a critic from Sify wrote that the film "is very slow moving. The only silver lining in this otherwise boring movie is Krishna, who has put in good performance. He is the one-man entertainment troupe in the film. The rest of the cast can be forgotten". Smriti Kashyap of Full Hyderabad wrote that "Anyway, if you can actually survive the feeling of suspended animation with a bunch of friendly autowallahs and Ambassador car drivers, then go ahead 'jawly jawly' all the way!" Telugu Cinema wrote "This dramatized version of Virataparva with modern setting is pretty predictable. However despite having a lot of villains and villainy in the film it goes more on comical notes. For all those who acted in the film including Krishna and Jayaprada the roles are a cake walk. Music and other technical departments are average".
