= Sontham (2002 film) =

2002 film by Srinu Vaitla

- Poster
- Directed by: Srinu Vaitla
- Written by: Chintapalli Ramana (Dialogues)
- Screenplay by: Srinu Vaitla
- Story by: Srinu Vaitla
- Produced by: S. Sompally; V. R. Kanneganti
- Starring: Aryan Rajesh; Namitha; Rohit; Sunil; Neha Pendse
- Cinematography: Sameer Reddy
- Edited by: Kola Bhaskar
- Music by: Devi Sri Prasad
- Production company: J. D. Arts
- Release date: 23 August 2002
- Running time: 145 minutes
- Country: India
- Language: Telugu

Sontham (transl. Belonging) is a 2002 Indian Telugu-language romantic comedy film written and directed by Srinu Vaitla. It stars Aryan Rajesh, Namitha, Rohit, and Neha Pendse, with music composed by Devi Sri Prasad.

Released on 23 August 2002, the film was an average grosser at the box office. However, over the years, its comedy scenes have gained cult status, making it one of the most frequently referenced Telugu films in internet memes.

== Plot ==
Vamsy, Nandu and Bose are childhood friends. Vamsy and Nandu grew up very close. Bose falls in love with Sowmya, one of their college mates. When Bose tells Vamsy about her, he deems it to be one more love affair that is bound to fail. Vamsy feels that friendship is more valuable than love and that love spoils a friendship. Nandu, who wanted to share her love towards Vamsy on his birthday, goes back to the shelter as she feels Vamsy might get offended.

Vamsy leaves for New Zealand to supervise the overseas operations of his father's company. In New Zealand, Vamsy realizes that he is in love with Nandu through a colleague at work, Maggy. When Vamsy returns to India, he finds out that Nandu is already engaged to Venkat. Just before her marriage, Nandu receives a bouquet from Maggy from New Zealand addressing both Vamsy and Nandu, congratulating them on their marriage. Realizing that Vamsy loves her, Nandu runs after him to the airport and unites with him.

== Cast ==
- Aryan Rajesh as Vamsy Krishna (voice dubbed by Sivaji)
- Namitha as Nandini "Nandu" (voice dubbed by Savitha Reddy)
- Rohit as Bose
- Neha Pendse as Sowmya
- Sunil as Seshagiri "Sesham"
- M. S. Narayana as Lecturer Bogeswara Rao
- Chitram Srinu as Sesham's friend
- Ramachandra as Sesham's friend
- Dharmavarapu Subramanyam as Subbu
- Asha Saini as Asha
- Jhansi as Lecturer Venkatalakshmi
- Adivi Sesh as Venkat, Nandu's fiancé
- Tanikella Bharani as Syam Prasad, Vamsi father
- Naresh as Nandu's father
- Hema as Nandu's mother
- Neelopher as Maggie
- Telangana Shakuntala as Naga Bala, Sesham's mother
- Ali as Sambhu, Sesham's friend
- Venu Madhav as Bujji, Sesham's friend
- Jaya Prakash Reddy as Gulabi, a thief
- Chinna as Jilani, Sesham's friend
- Rajitha
- Brinda Parekh guest appearance in song "Akkado Ikkado"

== Production ==
Aryan Rajesh shot for this film simultaneously with Hai which released a few months prior to this film. The film completed its first schedule in the second half of January 2002.

== Soundtrack ==
Sontham

Soundtrack album by Devi Sri Prasad
- Released: 2002
- Genre: soundtrack
- Length: 33:00
- Language: Telugu
- Label: Aditya Music
- Producer: Devi Sri Prasad

Devi Sri Prasad chronology
Kalusukovalani (2002)	Sontham (2002)	Khadgam (2002)

The music was composed by Devi Sri Prasad and was released on Aditya Music.

No.	Title	Lyrics	Singer(s)	Length
1.	"Sontham"	Sirivennela Seetharama Sastry	Tippu	04:47
2.	"Telusuna"	Sirivennela Seetharama Sastry	K. S. Chithra	04:37
3.	"Eppudo"	Sirivennela Seetharama Sastry	Mallikarjun	03:05
4.	"Enati Varaku"	Sirivennela Seetharama Sastry	Shaan, Sumangali	04:37
5.	"Akkado Ikkado"	Pothula Ravikiran	Malgudi Subha	05:09
6.	"Naayudo Naayudo"	Kulasekar	Devi Sri Prasad	05:31
7.	"Eppudo (Female)"	Sirivennela Seetharama Sastry	Sumangali	02:46
8.	"Music Bit (Instrumental)"		Instrumental	02:28
Total length:				33:00

== Reception ==
A critic from Sify wrote, "On the whole the film could have been marketed more as a comedy film rather than a love story".

== Box office ==
The film was an average grosser at the box office, but its comedy scenes have achieved cult status over the years and it is one of the most frequently used films on Telugu meme pages.
