= Thank You Subba Rao =

Indian film

- Theatrical release poster
- Directed by: E. V. V. Satyanarayana
- Written by: Marudhuri Raja (dialogues)
- Story by: Boopathy Pandian
- Produced by: Jeetu
- Starring: Srihari; Prakash Raj; Abhirami
- Music by: Vandemataram Srinivas
- Production company: A. A. Arts
- Release date: 12 October 2001
- Country: India
- Language: Telugu

Thank You Subba Rao is a 2001 Indian Telugu-language film directed by E. V. V. Satyanarayana. The film stars Srihari as the titular character, Prakash Raj and Abhirami, in her Telugu debut. It was theatrically released on 12 October 2001, and it was a box office failure. The film is inspired by Stakeout (1987) and its Malayalam remake Vandanam (1989).

== Cast ==
- Srihari as Subba Rao
- Prakash Raj as G. K.
- Abhirami as Dr. Susheela
- Dog as Shakeela
- L. B. Sriram as Pawan
- Brahmanandam as Priest
- Kota Srinivasa Rao as SP
- Rama Prabha as Subba Rao's mother
- M. S. Narayana as Peon
- Chalapati Rao as Nayana Guru
- Mallikarjuna Rao as SI

== Production ==
The film marks the debut of mass hero Srihari as a comedy hero and was completed in mid-2001. A dog plays a major role.

== Soundtrack ==
The film notably has no songs, and the score was composed by Vandemataram Srinivas.

== Reception ==
Gudipoodi Srihari from The Hindu wrote, "Prakash Raj and Abhirami dominate the show with Srihari playing the second fiddle to them. Some sequences at the end, featuring Srihari and LB Sriram are entertaining. Music score by Vandemataram is average". A reviewer of idlebrain.com said, "The first half of the film has no story and is full of comedy. The second half has a little bit of story and sentiment along with comedy. The comedy of the second half is very well received (mainly due to the presence of sentiment)". A reviewer of Sify wrote, "Prakash Raj proves he has a comic angle, while new girl Abhirami has made a decent debut in Telugu films. Thank god the film does not have any songs". Telugu Cinema wrote "With the difference in the story line EVV imprinted his mark of comedy which gives a familiar feeling. He even repeated scenes from his earlier films. Out and out it's an average film with EVV mark comedy".
