= Muthyam =

- Theatrical release poster
- Directed by: Vasan
- Written by: Nivas (dialogues)
- Screenplay by: Vasan
- Produced by: Venkat Ramana Reddy
- Starring: Rohit; Anu Choudhury
- Cinematography: Prabhu
- Edited by: Kola Bhaskar
- Music by: Vandemataram Srinivas
- Production company: Silverline Cinema
- Release date: 26 November 2001
- Country: India
- Language: Telugu

Muthyam (transl. Pearl) is a 2001 Indian Telugu-language romantic drama film directed by Vasan and starring Rohit and Anu Choudhury. The film was released on 26 November 2001 to mixed-to-negative reviews criticising the film's screenplay although the music was praised. The film underperformed at the box office.

== Plot ==
Karthik and Anu fall in love. However, Anu is unaware that her foster father is not her real father, and learns the truth about her real father: he killed his wife after learning that she was cheating on him. Anu must get his approval before marrying Karthik.

== Cast ==
- Rohit as Karthik
- Anu Choudhury as Anu
- Giri Babu as Major Chandrakanth
- AVS as Dr. G. Sivarama Krishna
- Ahuti Prasad as Dr. Surya
- Ali as Chanti
- Rallapalli as Shop Owner
- Gautam Raju as RTO Officer
- Siva Parvati as Rajani

== Soundtrack ==
The music was composed by Vandemataram Srinivas. All lyrics were written by Chandrabose.

- "Krishna Shasthri Lo" - S. P. Balasubrahmanyam, chorus
- "Noojiveedu Maamidi" - Udit Narayan, Mahalakshmi Iyer, chorus
- "Premalo Padadhama" - Sriram Prabhu, Swarnalatha, chorus
- "Vuchitam Vuchitam" - KK, chorus
- "Urike Kundhelu Song" - Nithyasri

== Reception ==
Gudipoodi Srihari of The Hindu wrote that "The film falls in the genre of youth films now in vogue, with weird themes revolving around inconsequential interpretations of love". Jeevi of Idlebrain.com rated the film two-and-a-half out of five and wrote that "The film story is very short. Screenplay is shabby. This film's duration is just 2 hours. Strength of the film is Vandemataram's music and songs. Weakness is screenplay".
