= Appudappudu =

- DVD cover
- Directed by: Chandra Siddhartha
- Written by: Madhukar (dialogues)
- Screenplay by: Chandra Siddhartha
- Story by: Chandra Siddhartha
- Produced by: A Ramesh Goud; PT Giridhara Rao
- Starring: Raja; Sriya Reddy
- Cinematography: KG Soman
- Edited by: Girish Lokesh
- Music by: R. P. Patnaik (songs); Madhukar
- Release date: 16 May 2003
- Country: India
- Language: Telugu

Appudappudu (transl. Sometimes) is a 2003 Indian Telugu-language romantic drama film directed by Chandra Siddhartha starring Raja and Sriya Reddy, in her Telugu debut.

== Plot ==
Sundeep and Radhika get married. After realizing their differences, they break up. However, they later realize that they are made for each other and try to unite with each other again.

== Cast ==
- Raja as Sundeep
- Sriya Reddy as Radhika
- Jayasudha as Radhika's mother
- Kaikala Satyanarayana
- Suman Setty as a servant
- Krishna Bhagawan
- Vizag Prasad
- Sudha
- Giribabu
- Benarjee
- Annapurna
- Ali
- M. S. Narayana
- L. B. Sriram
- Ashmita Karnani
- Shankar Melkote

== Soundtrack ==
The songs were composed by R. P. Patnaik while Madhukar composed the score. The lyrices are written by Chaitanya Prasad and Peddada Murthy. In an audio review of the soundtrack, Sreya Sunil of Idlebrain.com wrote that "Over all, the album is a passable fare except for two songs (Nee Kalalu Kavali, Idigo Ippude), which are instant winners".

No.	Title	Lyrics	Singer(s)	Length
1.	"Wahwa Wahwa"	Chaitanya Prasad	Natasha Gulmohar
2.	"Nee Kalalu Kaavali"	Chaitanya Prasad	R. P. Patnaik, Sunitha
3.	"Neekem Telusu"	Chaitanya Prasad	R. P. Patnaik, Usha
4.	"Idigo Ipude"	Peddada Murthy	R. P. Patnaik, Usha
5.	"Gudugudu Gunchem"	Peddada Murthy	Usha, Lenina, Gayatri, R. P. Patnaik, Ravi Varma
6.	"Nandalala Nandalala"	Peddada Murthy	Usha, R. P. Patnaik

== Release and reception ==
The film was initially scheduled to release on 1 April 2003.

Jeevi of Idlebrain.com gave this film a rating of two out of five and opined that "The first half of the film is boring. Second half of the film is slightly better. The best things about this film are songs and photography. This film suffers from bad editing and slow screenplay". A critic from Sify gave the film a verdict of "Missable" and said that "The emotional scenes are a let down due to the lack of story. The only saving grace of this insipid film is the music of R.P. Patnaik and the camera of Soman". Mithun Verma from Full Hyderabad criticised the film.

Although the film was a box office failure, Raja credits this film with giving him a wider reach.
