= Premaku Swagatam =

- Directed by: S. V. Krishna Reddy
- Written by: Diwakar Babu (screenplay); S. V. Krishna Reddy (story)
- Produced by: Taranga Subramanyam
- Starring: J. D. Chakravarthy; Soundarya; Prakash Raj; Brahmanandam
- Cinematography: Sarat
- Edited by: K. Ramgopal Reddy
- Music by: S. V. Krishna Reddy
- Distributed by: Taranga Films
- Release date: 18 January 2002
- Country: India
- Language: Telugu

Premaku Swagatam (lit. Welcome to love) is a 2002 Indian Telugu-language romance film, directed by S. V. Krishna Reddy and starring J. D. Chakravarthy and Soundarya.

== Plot ==
Lahari (Soundarya), daughter of a millionaire, Mahendra (Prakash Raj) falls in love with her car driver Balaji (J. D. Chakravarthy). Lahari announces her love for Balaji at her birthday party. Mahendra and Balaji don't want her to marry Balaji as he is poor. They agree that Lahari will stay with his big family in Balaji's small house. Mahendra learns that Balaji also loves Lahari but refuses because he is poor. Finally, Balaji agrees to marry Lahari.

== Cast ==
- J. D. Chakravarthy as Balaji
- Soundarya as Lahari (Voice dubbed by Shilpa)
- Prakash Raj as Mahendra
- Sunil as Tenali
- Brahmanandam
- M. S. Narayana
- Annapoorna as Balaji's mother
- L. B. Sriram as Balaji's father
- Allu Ramalingaiah as Balaji's grandfather
- Surya
- Delhi Rajeswari as Lahari's mother
- Gundu Hanumantha Rao as Chef
- Manya

== Production ==
The film was originally began under the title Pelliki Velayara but later changed the title as Cheyi Cheyi Kalupu then finalised the title as Premaku Swagatham.

== Soundtrack ==
No.	Title	Singer(s)	Length
1.	"Kohinoor"	Srinivasan
2.	"Vendi Vennello"	Kumar Sanu, Usha
3.	"Vey Vey Vey"	S. P. Balasubrahmanyam, Sujatha
4.	"Rangula"	Devan, Harini
5.	"Andala Yuvarani"	Maha Lakshmi, Udit Narayan
6.	"Cheli Nee Vypu Choose"	KK, Usha

== Reception ==
Idlebrain.com gave the film two stars out of five and wrote "This film has nothing to offer. It's a boring proposition right from the scene one." Telugu Cinema wrote "Krishna reddy is worst film ever. There is no logic and proper direction in any ways u see here. You will be yawning too many times in the film".
