= Girl Friend (2002 film) =

2002 Telugu film

- Promotional poster
- Directed by: G. Nageswara Reddy
- Written by: Story: Ravi-Siva; Screenplay: G. Nageswara Reddy; Dialogues: Marudhuri Raja
- Produced by: M Kumara Swamy
- Starring: Rohit; Anitha Patil; Babloo; Santosh Pavan
- Cinematography: S. Arun Kumar
- Music by: Vandemataram Srinivas
- Production company: Sri Kumara Swamy Creations
- Release date: 6 July 2002
- Country: India
- Language: Telugu

Girl Friend is a 2002 Indian Telugu-language romantic drama film directed by G. Nageswara Reddy and starring Rohit, Anitha Patil, Babloo, and Santosh Pavan.

The film was released to mixed reviews although the film's dialogues and music were praised.

== Cast ==
- Rohit as Vamsi
- Anitha Patil as Suvarna
- Babloo as Babloo
- Santosh Pavan as Pavan
- Chalapathi Rao as Vamsi's father
- Tanikella Bharani as Suvarna's father
- L. B. Sriram as Babloo's father
- Mallikarjuna Rao as Pavan's father
- Sivaparvathi as Vamsi's mother
- Padmaja Choudary as Babloo's mother
- Padma Jayanti as Pavan's mother
- M. S. Narayana as college principal
- Ali as a film producer
- Ruthika as an actress (cameo appearance in the song "Thaluku Thaluku")

== Soundtrack ==
The music was composed by Vandemataram Srinivas. The song "Nuvvu Yaadikelthe" was reused twice in Kannada: as "Nee Ellig Hontre" in Kaun Banega Kotyadipathi (2003) and as "Suvarna Suvarna" in 5 Idiots (2011).

Song	Lyricist	Singer(s)
"Line Maar De"	Taidala Bapu	Chakri
"Nuvvu Naaku Nachave"	Chandrabose	Kumar Sanu, Usha
"Nuvvu Yaadikelthe"	Suddala Ashok Teja	Udit Narayan
"Prementha Panichesi"	Taidala Bapu	R. P. Patnaik, Usha
"Kandireega Nadumu"	Taidala Bapu	Shankar Mahadevan
"Taluku Taluku"	Taidala Bapu	Shankar Mahadevan, Usha

== Reception ==
Gudipoodi Srihari of The Hindu opined that "It is a routine film that shows the whole college in a bad light". Jeevi of Idlebrain.com wrote that "This film is a paisa-vasool (transl. money's worth) film". Manju Latha Kalanidhi of Full Hyderabad criticised the film for being in the same tried and tested genre as Nuvve Kavali.

== Box office ==
Similar to G. Nageswara Reddy's and Rohit's first outing, 6 Teens, this film was also a box office success.
