= Marudhuri Raja =

Indian film writer

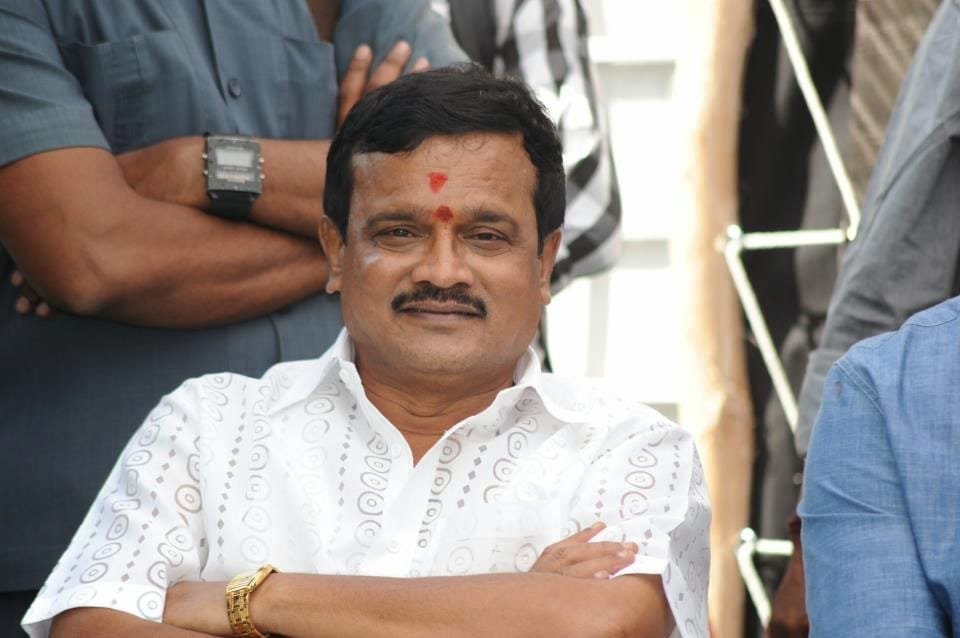
- Raja in 2024
- Born: Guntur, Andhra Pradesh, India
- Occupations: Playwright, Director, Writer
- Spouse: Marudhuri Kasturi
- Children: 2
- Relatives: M. V. S. Haranatha Rao (elder brother)

Marudhuri Raja is a Telugu film writer, director. He worked as a dialogue writer for more than 350 films. He worked with noted Telugu film directors like E. V. V. Satyanarayana, S. V. Krishna Reddy, K. Raghavendra Rao. Raja made his debut as a dialogue writer with the film Navabharatam.

== Personal life ==
Raja was born in Guntur and studied in Ongole. He was interested in theater arts since his childhood. One of five siblings, his elder brother, M. V. S. Haranatha Rao, was a noted film and stage writer and artist. His father Rangacharyulu was a clerk and mother was a carnatic music professional.

He used to go to mythological dramas along with his father. When his mother got transferred to Ongole, Raja also went there and joined Sarma College.

Raja wrote, directed and acted in stage plays since child hood. Before entering into the film industry he wrote 18 stage plays while schooling. Later he moved Hyderabad, found loved of his life Kasturi and is married to her. They have two children Vinod, Mahalakshmi.

== Career ==
Raja made his debut as a dialogue writer with the film Navabharatam. He got many opportunities later with noted directors including E. V. V. Satyanarayana, S. V. Krishna Reddy, and K. Raghavendra Rao.

== Filmography ==
- Agni (1989)
- Ontari Poratam
- Alibaba Aradajanu Dongalu (1993)
- Sisindri (1995)
- Subhakankshalu
- Suryavamsam
- Egire Pavurama
- Aavida Maa Aavide
- Harischandra
- Hanuman Junction
- Nuvvu Vastavani
- Antha Mana Manchike
- Eduruleni Manishi (2001)
- Thank You Subba Rao (2001)
- Neetho Cheppalani (2002)
- Girl Friend
- Pellam Oorelithe (2003)
- Juniors
- Chantigadu
- Sankharavam (2004)
- Yagnam
- Athanokkade (2005)
- Kanchanamala Cable TV
- Sravanamasam
- Mogudu Pellam O Dongodu
- Good Boy
- Ranam (2006)
- Veerabhadra
- Valliddari Vayasu Padahare
- Game
- Khatarnak
- Pagale Vennela (2007)
- Seema Sastri
- Ontari (2008)
- Kathanayakudu
- Oka Pellam Muddu Rendo Pellam Vaddu (2010)
- Gudu Gudu Gunjam
- Kathi Kantha Rao
- Vastadu Naa Raju
- Seema Tapakai
- Nuvva Nena (2012)
- Denikaina Ready
