= Rohit (actor) =

Indian Telugu actor

- Occupation: Actor
- Years active: 1998-2013; 2024-present

Rohit is an Indian actor known for starring in Telugu-language film in the 2000s.

== Career ==
Rohit worked as an assistant director under Tammareddy Bharadwaja in Swarnakka (1998) and made his lead debut with G. Nageswara Reddy's 6 Teens (2001). The film was a box office success and he became popular for the song "Devudu Varamandiste Ne Ninne Korukuntaale". Regarding his performance in Muthyam, a critic wrote that he "tried to do behavioral acting. But he lacks in the ease and spontaneity in his action". He then starred in a series of films that were box office flops with only Girl Friend (2002), his second collaboration with Nageswara Reddy, becoming successful. Regarding his performance in Girl Friend, a critic wrote that "Rohit has done an amazing work in this film. He is very natural in acting and has got very good dialogue delivery. His dances are very good comedy timing is perfect". According to Rohit, the song "Taluku Taraka" from the film was an "instant hit". During this period he also starred in the film Nenante Ishtamena, an unreleased film that was set in Malaysia. He played the second lead in Sontham (2002) with a critic noting that he "is far better than" his co-star Aryan Rajesh. He starred in several multistarrers such as Chandravamsam (2002), Shankar Dada MBBS (2004), Keelu Gurram (2005), Shankar Dada Zindabad (2007), Nava Vasantham (2007) and Maa Annayya Bangaram (2010).

In 2021, he was to make his comeback with the film Kalakar, but the film remains unreleased. In 2024, he made his comeback with RAM (Rapid Action Mission) after a fourteen year gap.

== Filmography ==
Year	Film	Role	Notes	Ref.
1998	Swarnakka	Naxalite	Cameo appearance in the song "Swarnakka"	
2000	Nuvve Kavali	Prakash's friend	Cameo appearance	
2001	6 Teens	Chanti		
2001	Muthyam	Karthik		
2002	Chandravamsam	Krishna		
2002	Girl Friend	Vamsi		
2002	Entha Bagundo		Cameo appearance	
2002	Sontham	Bose		
2003	Anaganaga O Kurraadu	Sachin		
2003	Janaki Weds Sriram	Sriram / Sitaram		
2003	Nenu Seetamahalakshmi	Naani		
2004	Shankar Dada MBBS	Thomas		
2005	Keelu Gurram	Charan		
2005	Good Boy	Vamsi		
2007	Shankar Dada Zindabad	Azad		
2007	Nava Vasantham	Raja		
2010	Maa Annayya Bangaram	Bhargav		
2013	Half Boil	Pawan		
2024	RAM (Rapid Action Mission)	Surya Prakash		
2026	Euphoria	Vivek Chakravarthy Vemulapalli		
