= Ammaye Navvithe =

2001 film by V. Jyoti Kumar

- Movie Poster
- Directed by: V. Jyoti Kumar
- Screenplay by: Jaladanki Sudhakar
- Story by: Udayraj
- Produced by: V. Anand Prasad
- Starring: Rajendra Prasad; Bhavana
- Cinematography: N. V. Suresh Kumar
- Edited by: Murali-Rammaiah
- Music by: M. M. Srilekha
- Production company: Sudha Art Productions
- Release date: 9 November 2001
- Running time: 129 mins
- Country: India
- Language: Telugu
- Budget: 2 crores INR
- Box office: 2.7 crores INR

Ammaye Navvithe (transl. If The Girl Laughs) is a 2001 Telugu-language comedy film produced by V. Anand Prasad under the Sudha Art Productions banner and directed by V. Jyoti Kumar. It stars Rajendra Prasad, Bhavana and music composed by M. M. Srilekha. This movie is one of the very few Telugu movies in which Kannada Actress Bhavana Ramanna acted. Though the film was recorded as a flop at the box office, Bhavana has been praised for her acting and naive glamorous appeal.

== Cast ==
- Rajendra Prasad as Sundaram
- Bhavana as Sirisha
- Ranganath as Seshadri Naidu
- Ahuti Prasad as Seshadri Naidu's brother
- Brahmanandam as D. D.
- M. S. Narayana as Principal M. Subba Rao
- L. B. Sriram as Village
- Prasad Babu as Seshadri Naidu's brother
- Navabharat Balaji as Seshadri Naidu's brother
- Tirupathi Prakash as Anji
- Gowtham Raju as Bus Passenger
- Kallu Chidambaram as Bus Conductor
- Satti Babu as Bus Passenger
- Jayasudha as Rajeswari
- Rama Prabha as Seshadri Naidu's mother
- Siva Parvathi as Seshadri Naidu's wife
- Delhi Rajeswari as Nirmala
- Sana as Seshadri Naidu's sister-in-law
- Shobha Rani as Principle's wife
- Alapati Lakshmi as Villager

== Soundtrack ==
Ammaye Navvithe

Film score by M. M. Srilekha
- Released: 2001
- Genre: Soundtrack
- Length: 23:42
- Label: Tips Music
- Producer: M. M. Srilekha

M. M. Srilekha chronology
Preminchu (2001)	Ammaye Navvithe (2001)	Parasuram (2002)

Music composed by M. M. Srilekha. Music released on TIPS Music Company.

No.	Title	Lyrics	Singer(s)	Length
1.	"Kokko Kodipetta"	Swetanaga	Harini	4:08
2.	"Ninna Ledhu Monna Ledhu"	Kula Shekhar	Ramana, M. M. Srilekha	4:26
3.	"ABCD"	Swetanaga	Ravi Varma, M. M. Srilekha	4:05
4.	"Chinni Krishnudochadu"	Jaladanki Sudhakar	S. P. Balasubrahmanyam, Rajendra Prasad, Ramana, Sunitha	3:22
5.	"Yamunathire Yamayama"	Swetanaga	S. P. Balasubrahmanyam, M. M. Srilekha	3:18
6.	"Dandalayya"	Jaladanki Sudhakar	S. P. Balasubrahmanyam	4:23

== Critical reception ==
Full Hyderabad wrote "The first thing that strikes you about this film is how a man who ruled the comedy genre of Telugu cinema for over a decade has been reduced to doing shoe-string budget films that can't even afford script and dialogue writers, forget glitzy and colorful presentation". Idlebrain wrote "V Jyoti Kumar has disappointed with his work. The movie goes on troubling the audiences right from the frame one. This direction of the film is not up to mark. As this film is a comedy one, the timing in comedy is very important. Jyoti Kumar did not show any command over handling the comedy scenes". Telugu Cinema wrote "Ammaye Navvithe is a film that stays intact due just to the laughs. Almost the entire film, except for the last few scenes, is full of witty lines, fantastic situations and oddball characters".
