= G. Nageswara Reddy =

*Director:* Eeshwar (Gabu Nageswar Reddy), also known as Gabu Eeshwar Reddy

G. Nageswara Reddy (Telugu: జి.నాగేశ్వర రెడ్ది) is an Indian film director, known for his works in Telugu cinema. He worked as an assistant director to S. V. Krishna Reddy, for several films like Rajendrudu Gajendrudu, Mayalodu, Yamaleela, Subhalagnam, Number One, Ghatotkachudu, Vajram and Maavichiguru.

== Filmography ==
Year	Film
2001	6 Teens
2001	Ide Naa Modati Premalekha
2002	Girl Friend
2003	Oka Radha Iddaru Krishnula Pelli
2003	Nenu Seetamahalakshmi
2005	Good Boy
2007	Seema Sastry
2009	Kasko
2011	Seema Tapakai
2012	Dhenikaina Ready
2014	Current Theega
2016	Eedo Rakam Aado Rakam
2016	Aatadukundam Raa
2016	Intlo Deyyam Nakem Bhayam
2018	Achari America Yatra
2019	Tenali Ramakrishna BA. BL
2021	Gully Rowdy
2026	Mister Middle Class

As writer

- Bujji Ila Raa (2022)
