= L. B. Sriram =

Indian actor

- L. B. Sriram in 2026
- Born: Lanka Bhadradri Sri Ramachandra Moorthy; 30 May 1952 (age 74) or 30 May 1956 (age 70); Nedunuru, East Godavari district, Andhra Pradesh, India
- Occupations: Actor; comedian; playwright; screenwriter; thespian
- Awards: 5 Nandi Awards

Lanka Bhadradri Sri Ramachandra Moorthy (born Lanka Bhadradri Sri Ramachandra Moorthy; 30 May 1952/1956) is an Indian actor, comedian, writer, playwright, producer, and thespian known for his works in Telugu cinema and theatre.

== Career ==
He made his feature film debut with Kokila (1990) as a dialogue writer.

He owns the production house Life is Beautiful Creations. He subsequently went on to star in nearly 500 films in a variety of roles in works such as Chala Bagundi (2000), Ammo! Okato Tareekhu (2000), Azad (2000), Hanuman Junction (2001), Itlu Sravani Subramanyam, (2001), Aadi (2002), Dil (2003), Chatrapathi (2005), Evadi Gola Vaadidhi (2005), Stalin (2006), Seema Sastri (2007), Gamyam (2008), Sontha Ooru (2009), Yevadu (2014), Legend (2014) and Sarainodu (2016). Regarded as one of the finest method actors in Telugu cinema, Sriram has won five state Nandi Awards. He played Anjineyulu in the web series Amrutham Dhvitheeyam, a sequel to Amrutham.

== Filmography ==
Key
†	Denotes films that have not yet been released

=== Film ===
Year	Title	Role	Notes
1991	April 1 Vidudala	Barber	Uncredited role
1994	Kishkindha Kanda		
1995	Dear Brother		
1995	Miss 420		
1997	Circus Sattipandu		
1997	Osi Naa Maradala		
1998	Daddy Daddy		
1999	Arundhathi		
2000	Hands Up	V.I.P. Indian Traveling Goods worker	
2000	Chala Bagundi	Seetha's father	
2000	Sardukupodaam Randi		
2000	Goppinti Alludu		
2000	Manasunna Maaraju		
2000	Ninne Premistha		
2000	Azad		
2000	Vamsi		
2000	Jayam Manadera		
2000	Ammo! Okato Tareekhu		
2000	Tirumala Tirupati Venkatesa		
2001	Mrugaraju		
2001	Eduruleni Manishi		
2001	Cheppalani Vundhi		
2001	Adhipathi		
2001	Ide Naa Modati Premalekha		
2001	Ammaye Navvithe		
2001	Chinna		
2001	Raa		
2001	6 Teens		
2001	Ammayi Kosam		
2001	Maa Aavida Meeda Ottu Mee Aavida Chala Manchidi		
2001	Budget Padmanabham	Vaastu Totti Subrahmanyam	
2001	Itlu Sravani Subramanyam		
2001	Thank You Subba Rao		
2001	Tholi Valapu		
2001	Hanuman Junction	Chakram	
2002	Allari Ramudu		
2002	Aadi	College Principal	
2002	Premaku Swagatam		
2002	Friends		
2002	Santosham		
2002	Tappu Chesi Pappu Koodu		
2002	Bobby		
2002	Hai		
2002	Girl Friend		
2002	Avunu Valliddaru Ista Paddaru!		
2002	Chennakesava Reddy	Hippi Lahari	
2002	Yuva Rathna		
2002	Siva Rama Raju	Srisailam	
2002	Pilisthe Palukutha		
2002	Thotti Gang	Alexander	
2003	Naaga		
2003	Pellam Oorelithe		
2003	Simhachalam	Seetharama Raju's personal lawyer	
2003	Fools		
2003	Uthsaham		
2003	Dil	Ramanatham	
2003	Ottesi Cheputunna		
2003	Missamma		
2003	Appudappudu		
2003	Taarak		
2003	Vasantham		
2003	Charminar		
2003	Oka Radha Iddaru Krishnula Pelli		
2003	Janaki Weds Sriram		
2003	Neeke Manasichaanu	Pandu	
2003	Maa Alludu Very Good		
2004	Lakshmi Narasimha		
2004	Aaruguru Pativratalu		
2004	Abhi		
2004	Koduku		
2004	Sri Anjaneyam		
2004	Valliddaru Okkate		
2004	Shiva Shankar		
2004	Gudumba Shankar		
2004	Cheppave Chirugali		
2004	Mr & Mrs Sailaja Krishnamurthy		
2005	Modati Cinema		
2005	Evadi Gola Vaadidhi	Chain smoker Gangadhar	
2005	Chhatrapati		
2005	Orey Pandu		
2005	Dhairyam		
2005	Radha Gopalam		
2005	Sravanamasam		
2005	Prayatnam		
2005	Bunny		
2005	Subash Chandra Bose		
2005	Nuvvante Naakishtam		
2005	Okkade	Subba Rao	
2005	Veeri Veeri Gummadi Pandu		
2005	Good Boy	Vamsi's father	
2005	Moguds Pellams		
2005	Seenugadu Chiranjeevi Fan		
2005	Mahanandi		
2006	Vijay IPS		
2006	Nee Navvu Chalu		
2006	Lakshmi		
2006	Happy		
2006	Bangaram		
2006	Hanumanthu		
2006	Amma Cheppindi		
2006	Photo		
2006	Maa Iddari Madhya		
2006	Stalin		
2006	Kedi	Professor Vinayagam	Tamil film
2006	Bhagyalakshmi Bumper Draw		
2006	Annavaram		
2007	Madhumasam		
2007	Athili Sattibabu LKG		
2007	Veduka		
2007	Yamagola Malli Modalayindi		
2007	Bhajantrilu		
2007	Viyyalavari Kayyalu		
2007	Seema Sastry		
2008	Maisamma IPS		
2008	Sundarakanda		
2008	Nee Sukhame Be Koruthunna		
2008	Idi Sangathi		
2008	Gamyam		
2008	Nagaram		
2008	Bhadradri		
2008	Tinnama Padukunnama, Tellarinda		
2008	Ullasamga Utsahamga	Subbayya	
2008	Siddu from Sikakulam	Village priest	
2008	Pandurangadu	Narada	
2008	Bommana Brothers Chandana Sisters		
2008	Baladur		
2008	Kousalya Supraja Rama		
2008	Blade Babji	Edukondalu	
2008	Kuberulu		
2009	Adhineta		
2009	Bangaru Babu		
2009	Bendu Apparao R.M.P	Samaram (chicken) feeder	
2009	Sontha Ooru	Rudrudu	
2009	Kick		
2010	Shambo Shiva Shambo		
2010	Taj Mahal		
2010	Srimathi Kalyanam		
2010	Simha		
2010	Betting Bangaraju		
2010	Cara Majaka		
2010	Alasyam Amrutham		
2010	Kathi Kantha Rao	Marriage Broker	
2011	Seema Tapakai	Aravind Swamy ( Millionaire Mitra)	
2012	Racha		
2012	Daruvu	Narada Muni	
2012	Denikaina Ready		
2012	Krishnam Vande Jagadgurum	Matti Raju	
2013	Love Cycle		
2013	Mr. Pellikoduku		
2013	Jagadguru Adi Shankara		
2013	Gouravam	Shanmugam's father	Tamil film
2013	Gouravam	Shankar's father	
2013	Bunny n Cherry		
2013	Music Magic		
2014	Legend		
2014	Yevadu	Shashank's father	
2015	Ori Devudoy		
2015	Chandrika		Kannada-Telugu film
2016	Sarrainodu	raped victim's father	
2016	Manamantha	Astrologer	
2016	Soggade Chinni Nayana	temple priest	
2018	Naa Nuvve		
2018	Sharabha		
2019	Voter	Bhiksaraju	
2022	Konda	Konda Komuraiah	
2023	Vinaro Bhagyamu Vishnu Katha	Vishnu's co-librarian	
2023	Bedurulanka 2012		
2024	Laggam	Ramayya alias Bapu	
2026	Ustaad Bhagat Singh	Leela’s grandfather	
2026	Garividi Lakshmi		

=== Television ===
Year	Title	Role	Network	Notes
2019	Gods of Dharmapuri (G.O.D)	DN Reddy	ZEE5	
2020	Amrutham Dhvitheeyam	Amudala Anjaneyulu aka Anji	ZEE5	

=== As writer ===
Year	Title	Writer
1990	Kokila	Dialogues
1991	April 1 Vidudala	Dialogues
1991	Appula Appa Rao	Dialogues
1992	Seetharatman Gari Abbayi	Dialogues
1992	Aa Okkati Adakku	Dialogues
1993	Varasudu	Dialogues
1993	Rajeswari Kalyanam	Dialogues
1993	Amma Koduku	Dialogues
1994	Kishkindha Kanda	Dialogues
1994	O Thandri O Koduku	Dialogues
1994	Hello Brother	Dialogues
1995	Dear Brother	Dialogues
1995	Miss 420	Dialogues
1996	Pittala Dora	Dialogues
1996	Jagadeka Veerudu	Dialogues
1996	Ladies Doctor	Dialogues
1996	Nalla Pussalu	Dialogues
1997	Hitler	Dialogues
1997	Adirindi Guru	Dialogues
1997	Osi Naa Maradala	Dialogues
1997	Abbai Gari Pelli	Dialogues
1997	Omkaram	Dialogues
1998	Daddy Daddy	Dialogues
1999	Ramasakkanodu	Dialogues
1999	Rythu Rajyam	Dialogues
2006	Bhagyalakshmi Bumper Draw	Dialogues
2009	Sontha Ooru	Dialogues

== Awards ==
Year	Awards	Film	Notes
1999	Nandi Award for Best Dialogue Writer	Ramasakkanodu	
2000	Nandi Award for Best Male Comedian	Chaala Bagundhi	
2009	Nandi Award for Best Dialogue Writer	Sontha Ooru	
2009	Nandi Award for Best Character Actor	Sontha Ooru	
2016	Nandi Award for Best Short film producer & Director	Dolu-Sannai	
