= 6 Teens =

2001 film by G.Nageswara Reddy

- DVD cover
- Directed by: G. Nageswara Reddy
- Written by: Marudhuri Raja
- Screenplay by: G. Nageswara Reddy
- Produced by: J. Srinivasa Reddy
- Starring: Rohit; Ruthika; Santosh Pavan; Abhijit; Amit
- Cinematography: S. Arun Kumar
- Edited by: K. Ramgopal Reddy
- Music by: Ghantadi Krishna
- Production company: Harsha Creations
- Distributed by: Harsha Creations; Usha Kiran Movies
- Release date: 16 March 2001
- Running time: 146 minutes
- Country: India
- Language: Telugu
- Budget: ₹35 Lakhs
- Box office: ₹5.5 Crore

6 Teens is a 2001 Indian Telugu-language teen film directed by G.Nageswara Reddy making his directorial debut and produced by J.Srinivasa Reddy and distributed by Usha Kiran Movies. The film stars newcomers Rohit, Ruthika, Rakhi Sawant, Santosh Pavan, Abhijit and Amit. The movie plot was inspired from 1983 Telugu movie Rendu Jella Sita and 1996 Hindi movie Raja Hindustani. The film had 100 day run in theaters across Andhra Pradesh in 3 centers. The film was remade in Kannada as Friends (2002), which was also a huge success.

== Plot ==
6 Teens is story about a group of five sex-obsessed teenage boys who, after humiliating themselves at college, pursue a new girl neighbour from the U.S.

== Cast ==
- Rohit as Chanti
- Ruthika as Ankita
- Santosh Pavan as Chinna
- Abhijit
- Amit
- Vijaya Bhaskar
- Rakhi Sawant as Nandini
- M. S. Narayana
- L. B. Sriram
- Mallikarjuna Rao as Ankita's uncle
- Rajitha as Ankita's aunt
- Ashmita Karnani as Mary
- Ironleg Sastri

== Production ==
Director G. Nageswara Reddy was traveling with the script of '6 Teens' and spent months looking for a producer, for his debut project to get materialized. Finally, J. Srinivasa Reddy helmed the project under his banner 'Harsha Creations'. Marudhuri Raja provided dialogues and S. Arun Kumar was brought on board to crank the camera. Rohit, who worked as an assistant director for Tammareddy Bharadwaja's Swarnakka (1998) in which he also made a cameo appearance, made his lead acting debut with this film after being called in for a screen test. Santosh Pawan, Abhijit, Amit and Vijay Bhaskar were cast as friends. L. B. Sriram was offered a comedic role of an auto driver. Rakhi Sawant joined the shoot as a supporting cast during the model hunt for actresses at Ramoji Film City. Actress Ruthika was finalized by the director during his visit to Mumbai for female lead. Shooting started immediately after finalizing the actress and the whole production was completed in couple of schedules with overall budget of ₹35 Lakhs. After viewing the first copy of the film, J. Srinivasa Reddy teamed up with Usha Kiran Movies to release the final product.

== Music ==
The music was composed by Ghantadi Krishna. The song "Devudu Varamandisthe" became highly popular. The same song was reused in the Kannada version as "Devaru Varavanu Kotre", which inspired a 2002 film of the same name.

Track listing
No.	Title	Lyrics	Singer(s)	Length
1.	"Devudu Varamandisthe"	Suddala Ashok Teja	Kumar Sanu	6:12
2.	"Mukkuki Mukkera"	Suddala Ashok Teja	Udit Narayan, Sudha	4:54
3.	"Sixteen Years"	Suddala Ashok Teja	Raghu Kunche	4:32
4.	"Buli Buli Yerrani"	Suddala Ashok Teja	Shaan	4:56
5.	"Stella Model"	Suddala Ashok Teja	P. Unnikrishnan	4:58

== Reception ==
Even before the film's release, the title '6Teens' and the audio was a huge success. The song "Devudu Varamandisthe" became highly popular and became a crowd puller to the theaters. The film's audio sales brought huge profits and the film opened with house full theaters across Andhra Pradesh. During the film's final run, it made around ₹5.5 crore gross and a distributor share of ₹3.5 crore against ₹35 Lakhs budget in 2001.

== Remakes ==
After the success of '6 Teens' in Telugu, it was remade in Kannada as 'Friends' in the year 2002, with Ruthika reprising her role as 'Ankita'. The songs were reused by the music director Ghantadi Krishna and all were instant chartbusters. The movie became huge success in Kannada as well. A Tamil remake of the film with the same title, headlined by actor Jai, was shot and complete in 2003 with Deva as the composer. However, the film did not have a theatrical release.

== Sequel ==
A sequel to '6 Teens' film titled '9 Teens' was planned in 2003 but later dropped. Ghantadi Krishna worked on a sequel titled 'Risk' in 2023 but the film remains unreleased.
