= List of songs recorded by Anuradha Sriram =

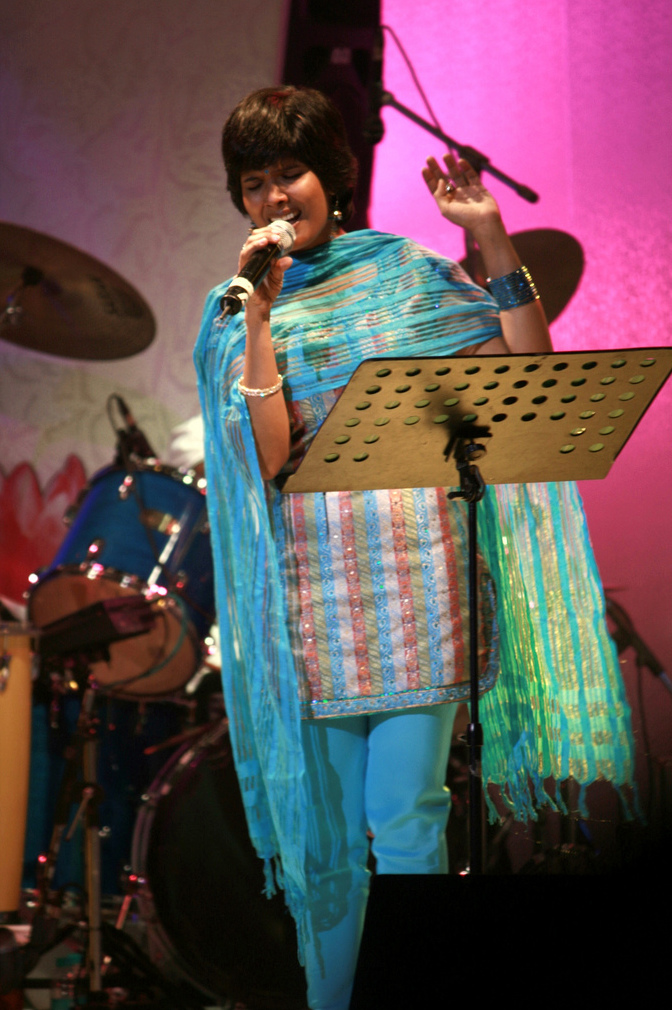
Anuradha Sriram in 2013

Anuradha Sriram (9 July 1970) is an Indian Carnatic vocalist and film playback singer. Best known for her work in South Indian filmsalso worked in a few projects in other Indian language and Sinhala films. Anuradha has recorded over 4000 songs. She has also recorded songs for many non-film albums, tele-series, devotionals and classical collaborations.

Anuradha debuted as a singer with the group song "Malarodu Malaringu" composed by A. R. Rahman for the film Bombay (1995). However, she shot to fame with her solo song "Anbendra Mazhayile" from the film Minsara Kanavu (1997), again composed by A. R. Rahman. Since then, Anuradha has recorded thousands of film songs for various prominent South Indian music composers such as Ilaiyaraja, Vidyasagar, Deva, Anu Malik, M. M. Keeravani, Sirpy, Hamsalekha, Ouseppachan, Mani Sharma, Koti, Mohan Sithara, Yuvan Shankar Raja, Harris Jayaraj and others.

== Recorded film songs ==
Anuradha has sung over 4000 songs in Tamil, Sinhala, Kannada, Hindi, Bengali, Telugu and Malayalam.

== Tamil film songs ==
=== 1990s ===
Year	Film	Song	Composer(s)	Writer(s)	Co-artist(s)
1995	Bombay	"Malarodu Malaringu"	A. R. Rahman	Vairamuthu	Sujatha
1995	Bombay	"Idhu Annai Bhoomi"	A. R. Rahman	Vairamuthu	Sujatha, Neol James, Srinivas, Sivanesan, Ganga Sitharasu, Renuka
1995	Pasumpon	"Thennaattu Singame"	Vidyasagar	Vairamuthu	Pushpavanam Kuppusamy, Kalpana Raghavendar
1995	Indira	"Ini Achham Achham Illai"	A. R. Rahman	Vairamuthu	Sujatha, G. V. Prakash Kumar, Swetha Mohan, Esther
1995	Villadhi Villain	"Vaimaye Vellum"	Vidyasagar	Vairamuthu	Deepak
1995	Vishnu	"Hamma Hamma"	Deva	Pulamaipithan	S. N. Surendar
1995	Aasai	"Meenammaa"	Deva	Vaali	P. Unnikrishnan
1995	Varraar Sandiyar	"Dindukallu"	Deva	Piraisoodan	
1995	Thotta Chinungi	"Pep Pepsi Cola"	Philip Jerry	Vaali	Jerry
1995	Thotta Chinungi	"Ramya Ramya"	Philip Jerry	Vaali	S. P. Balasubrahmanyam, Jerry
1996	Vaanmathi	"Oru Naalum"	Deva	Vaali	P. Unnikrishnan
1996	Kalloori Vaasal	"En Manathai"	Deva	Vaali	Hariharan
1996	Kalloori Vaasal	"Super Hit"	Deva	Vairamuthu	Mano
1996	Sengottai	"Paadu Paadu"	Vidyasagar	Vairamuthu	K. S. Chithra
1996	Aavathum Pennale Azhivathum Pennale	"Mavane Magarasane"	Bala Bharathi	Piraisoodan	
1996	Kadhal Kottai	"Nalam Nalamariya Aaval"	Deva	Agathiyan	S. P. Balasubrahmanyam
1996	Priyam	"Dilruba Dilruba"	Vidyasagar	Vairamuthu	Gopal Rao
1996	Andha Naal	"Vacha Vacha"	Soundaryan	Piraisoodan	
1996	Andha Naal	"Devanin Vasalil"	Soundaryan	Piraisoodan	Mano
1996	Gokulathil Seethai	"Anthi Mantharai"	Deva	Agathiyan	Suresh Peters
1996	Kalki	"Ezhuthugiren Oru Kaditham"	Deva	Ilandevan	K. S. Chithra
1996	Nethaji	"Raappothu"	Vidyasagar	Vaali	
1996	Nethaji	"My Dear My Dear"	Vidyasagar	Vaali	Febi Mani, Feji Mani, Pop Shalini
1996	Panchalankurichi	"Un Uthattora Sivappe"	Deva	Vairamuthu	Hariharan
1996	Panchalankurichi	"Vantheyalla"	Deva	Vairamuthu	Suresh Peters
1996	Gopala Gopala	"Kanna Nee Varuvai"	Deva	Vairamuthu	Ishrath, Meera Krishnan
1997	Minsara Kanavu	"Anbendra Mazhaiyile"	A. R. Rahman	Vairamuthu	
1997	Periya Thambi	"Taj Mahale"	Deva	Vairamuthu	Hariharan
1997	Gopura Deepam	"Ullame Unakkuthaan"	Soundaryan	Vairamuthu	S. P. Balasubrahmanyam
1997	Mappillai Gounder	"Pattikkaattu Life"	Deva	Kalidasan	Mano
1997	Dhinamum Ennai Gavani	"College En Kaiyyile"	Sirpy	Arivumathi	
1997	Dhinamum Ennai Gavani	"Vaa Vaa Beta"	Sirpy	Kamakodiyan	
1997	Pongalo Pongal	"Pattikaattu Pattadharigal"	Deva	Vaali	Krishnaraj
1997	Pasamulla Pandiyare	"Kaiya Idhu"	Deva	Piraisoodan	Deva
1997	Pasamulla Pandiyare	"Rukku Rukku"	Deva	Piraisoodan	Bharathi
1997	Pasamulla Pandiyare	"Discovery Channel"	Deva	Piraisoodan	
1997	Once More	"Malargale"	Deva	Vairamuthu	S. N. Surendar
1997	Once More	"Chinna Chinna Kadhal"	Deva	Vairamuthu	Malaysia Vasudevan, Deva, Krishnaraj
1997	Kaadhali	"Mumbai Kaatre"	Deva	Ponniyin Selvan	Mano
1997	Kaadhali	"O Nenjae"	Deva	Kalidasan	
1997	Pagaivan	"Rajanae"	Deva	Vairamuthu	Arunmozhi
1997	Pagaivan	"Poo Malai Podum"	Deva	Vairamuthu	
1997	Kadhal Palli	"Moru Moru"	Deva	Vairamuthu	
1997	Adimai Changili	"Mazhai Nadathum"	Deva	Vairamuthu	Krishnaraj
1997	Adimai Changili	"Kanaga Thai"	Deva	Vairamuthu	Deva
1997	Aahaa Enna Porutham	"Kananguruvi"	Vidyasagar	Vairamuthu	Deepak
1997	Samrat	"Vaa Vathiyaare"	Manoj–Gyan	Muthulingam	Mano
1997	Aahaa..!	"Kozhi Vandhadhaa"	Deva	Vaali	Malaysia Vasudevan, Yugendran, Sujatha
1997	Periya Manushan	"Vaalappari Chinna"	Deva	Vaali	Mano
1997	Porkkaalam	"Karuvela Kattukkulle"	Deva	Vairamuthu	Arunmozhi, Sujatha
1997	Vidukathai	"Kidaichiruchu"	Deva	Agathiyan	Krishnaraj
1997	Janakiraman	"Pottu Mela Pottu"	Sirpy	Palani Bharathi	S. P. Balasubrahmanyam
1997	Rettai Jadai Vayasu	"Maattikittaan Maattikittaan"	Deva	Ilakkiyan	Deva
1997	Pudhalvan	"Cellular Phone"	Deva	Vairamuthu	
1997	Itha Oru Snehagatha (D)	"Vidu Vidu"	Johnson		A. R. Reihana
1998	Santhosham	"Sethu Mathava"	Deva	Agathiyan	P. Unnikrishnan
1998	Ninaithen Vandhai	"Malligaiye Malligaiye"	Deva	Palani Bharathi	K. S. Chithra
1998	Ponnu Velayira Bhoomi	"Poyyaa Un Moonjula"	Deva	Vaali	Deva, Swarnalatha, Vadivelu
1998	Jeans	"Anbae Anbae"	A. R. Rahman	Vairamuthu	Hariharan
1998	Uyire (D)	Dil Se Re	A. R. Rahman	Vairamuthu	A. R. Rahman, Anupama, Febi Mani
1998	Iniyavale	"Malarodu Piranthavala"	Deva	Arivumathi	Krishnaraj
1998	Iniyavale	"Thendral"	Deva	Arivumathi	
1998	Golmaal	"Twinkle Twinkle"	Bala Bharathi	Arivumathi	
1998	Priyamudan	"Mouriya"	Deva	Arivumathi	Vijay
1998	Sandhippoma	"Gnapagam Irukiradha"	Deva	Vairamuthu	Hariharan
1998	Kalyana Galatta	"Adiye Kuruvamma"	Yuvan Shankar Raja	Palani Bharathi	Mano
1998	Nilaave Vaa	"Nilave Nilave"	Vidyasagar	Vairamuthu	Vijay
1998	En Aasai Rasave	"Munthi Munthi"	Deva	Kasthuri Raja	Malaysia Vasudevan
1998	Kannedhirey Thondrinal	"Chinna Chinna Kiliye"	Deva	Vairamuthu	Hariharan, Shobhana
1998	Senthooram	"Un Pakkathile"	Ilaiyaraaja	Vaali	Ilaiyaraaja
1998	Aasai Thambi	"I Love You"	Adithyan	Palani Bharathi	Mano
1998	Unnudan	"Dil Dil"	Deva	Vairamuthu	Mano
1998	Veeram Vilanja Mannu	"Pacha Marikozhundu"	Deva	Kasthuri Raja	S. P. Balasubrahmanyam
1998	Guru Paarvai	"Nandavana Poove"	Deva	Vaali	P. Unnikrishnan
1998	Taalam (D)	"Taalam Illamal"	A. R. Rahman	Vairamuthu	Sujatha, T. L. Maharajan, A. R. Rahman
1998	Monalisa (D)	Ninaithale Innikum"	A. R. Rahman		
1999	Sundari Neeyum Sundaran Naanum	"Manipura Manipura"	Deva	Kamakodiyan	Srinivas
1999	Suriya Paarvai	"Panirendu Vayasula"	S. A. Rajkumar	Palani Bharathi	Malgudi Subha
1999	Kallazhagar	"Oh Manalae"	Deva	Nandalala	S. P. B. Charan
1999	Ethirum Pudhirum	"Kathu Pasanga"	Vidyasagar	Vairamuthu	Pushpavanam Kuppusamy, Malaysia Vasudevan
1999	Ethirum Pudhirum	"Ellorkkum Oru"	Vidyasagar	Vairamuthu	
1999	Endrendrum Kadhal	"O Thendrale"	Manoj–Gyan	Arivumathi	S. P. Balasubrahmanyam
1999	Endrendrum Kadhal	"Take it Easy"	Manoj–Gyan	Piraisoodan	
1999	Ullathai Killathe	"Naan Musolini"	Deva	Pa. Vijay	Naveen
1999	Monisha En Monalisa	"Don't Try to Love Me"	T. Rajendar	T. Rajendar	
1999	Vaalee	"Nilavai Konduvaa"	Deva	Vairamuthu	P. Unnikrishnan
1999	Vaalee	"Vaanil Kaayuthey"	Deva	Vairamuthu	Mano
1999	Annan Thangachi	"Thangachi Thangachi"	Deva	Ponniyin Selvan	Krishnaraj
1999	Nenjinile	"Madras Dosth"	Deva	Palani Bharathi	Krishnaraj, Naveen
1999	Suyamvaram	"Kaanakozhikku"	Deva	Ponniyin Selvan	Sabesan
1999	Rojavanam	"I Have Fallen"	Bharadwaj	Vairamuthu	P. Unnikrishnan
1999	Ponvizha	"Ponni Nadhi"	Deva	Asokan	S. P. Balasubrahmanyam
1999	Anbulla Kadhalukku	"Kalyaanamaam Kalyaanam"	Deva	Arivumathi	Krishnaraj, Murali
1999	Anbulla Kadhalukku	"Manmatha Malaiye"	Deva	Arivumathi	P. Unnikrishnan, A. R. Reihana
1999	Unakkaga Ellam Unakkaga	"Monalisa"	Yuvan Shankar Raja	Kalaikumar	Devan Ekambaram
1999	Maravathe Kanmaniye	"Ellora Oviyam"	Mahakumar	Kalaikumar	P. Unnikrishnan, Sujatha
1999	Hello	"Chella Chella"	Deva	Vairamuthu	Srinivas
1999	Ooty	"O Vennila"	Deva	Palani Bharathi	
1999	Pudhu Kudithanam	"Adi Sammatham"	Deva	Arivumathi	P. Unnikrishnan
1999	Iraniyan	"Ayyarettu"	Deva	Vairamuthu	Krishnaraj
1999	Thirupathi Ezhumalai Venkatesa	"Nilavoda Thangachi"	S. A. Rajkumar	Kalaikumar	Mano
1999	Unnaruge Naan Irundhal	"Podava Kattina"	Deva	Palani Bharathi	Shankar Mahadevan
1999	Unnaruge Naan Irundhal	"Victoria Victoria"	Deva	Subhash	Naveen
1999	Azhagarsamy	"Konjum Strawberry"	Deva	Palani Bharathi	
1999	Paattali	"Chinna Chinna Veettu"	S. A. Rajkumar	Viveka	Sujatha
1999	Paattali	"Ulaga Azhagiya"	S. A. Rajkumar	Kalidasan	Harini, Srinivas

=== 2000s ===
Year	Film	Song	Composer(s)	Writer(s)	Co-artist(s)
2000	Kannukkul Nilavu	"Roja Poonthottam"	Ilaiyaraaja	Palani Bharathi	P. Unnikrishnan
2000	Kannukkul Nilavu	"Enthan Kuyil Engae"	Ilaiyaraaja	Palani Bharathi	P. Unnikrishnan
2000	Kannukkul Nilavu	"Oru Naal Oru Kanavu"	Ilaiyaraaja	Palani Bharathi	K. J. Yesudas
2000	Vaanathaippola	"Nathiye Adi Nile Nathiye"	S. A. Rajkumar	Pa. Vijay	Sukhwinder Singh
2000	Eazhaiyin Sirippil	"Karu Karu Karuppayi"	Deva	K. Subash	Unni Menon
2000	Annai	"Hey Chittuku Chittan"	Dhina	Kadhal Mathi	
2000	Sudhandhiram	"Konjam Chillunu"	S. A. Rajkumar	Kalaikumar	S. P. Balasubrahmanyam
2000	Mugavaree	"Poo Virinjachu"	Deva	Vairamuthu	P. Unnikrishnan
2000	Vallarasu	"Hello Mr. Naidu"	Deva	Vairamuthu	Mano
2000	James Pandu	"Nikkattuma Nadakkattuma"	S. A. Rajkumar	Kalidasan	Mano
2000	Veeranadai	"Vaanam Paatha Bhoomiyile"	Deva	Seeman	Gopal Rao
2000	Kandha Kadamba Kathir Vela	"Eduda Namma"	S. A. Rajkumar	Kalidasan	S. A. Rajkumar
2000	Kandha Kadamba Kathir Vela	"Pathumani"	S. A. Rajkumar	Viveka	Mano
2000	Kushi	"Oru Ponnu Onnu"	Deva	Vairamuthu	Hariharan
2000	Kushi	"Oh Vennilaa"	Deva	Vairamuthu	P. Unnikrishnan
2000	Unnai Kodu Ennai Tharuven	"Iduppu Selaikkulla"	S. A. Rajkumar	Pa. Vijay	Shankar Mahadevan
2000	Karisakattu Poove	"Ethanai Manikku"	Ilaiyaraaja	Kasthuri Raja	Arunmozhi
2000	Appu	"Koila Koila"	Deva	Vairamuthu	Hariharan
2000	Ennamma Kannu	"Naan Oru Pombala Rajini"	Deva	Vaali	T. K. Kala
2000	Vetri Kodi Kattu	"Karupputhan Enakku Pidicha"	Deva	Vairamuthu	
2000	Pennin Manathai Thottu	"Kalloori Vaanil"	S. A. Rajkumar	Vaali	Devan Ekambaram, Deepika
2000	Kuberan	"Kadhalikkum Pengalukku"	S. A. Rajkumar	Arivumathi	P. Unnikrishnan
2000	Doubles	"Rama Rama"	Srikanth Deva	Vairamuthu	Swarnalatha
2000	Parthen Rasithen	"Thinnadhey"	Bharadwaj	Vairamuthu	Shankar Mahadevan
2000	Kannaal Pesavaa	"Chinna Puraave"	Deva	Raaj Khanna	P. Unnikrishnan
2000	Chinna Chinna Kannile	"Chikkiditta Naane"	Sampath Selvan	Vairamuthu	Sampath Selvan
2000	Chinna Chinna Kannile	"Greeting Cardaa"	Sampath Selvan	Na. Muthukumar	Malgudi Subha
2000	Sabhash	"Palai Keeley"	Deva	K. Subash	Unni Menon
2000	Kannukku Kannaga	"Computer Graphic"	Deva	Vaali	
2000	Palayathu Amman	"Paal Nilaa"	S. A. Rajkumar	Vaali	Swarnalatha
2000	Priyamaanavale	"Mississippi Nadhi Kulunga"	S. A. Rajkumar	Vaali	Vijay
2000	Vanna Thamizh Pattu	"Vilaiyattu Vilaiyattu"	S. A. Rajkumar	Vaali	Srinivas, Sujatha
2000	En Sakhiye	"Sakhiye"	Pradeep Ravi	Kamakodiyan	Prasanna
2000	Manu Needhi	"Ele Karuthhamma"	Deva	Snehan	Krishnaraj
2000	Nee Enthan Vaanam	"Pattu Papa"	Sangeetha Rajan	Piraisoodan	
2000	Kadhal Rojavae	"Chinna Vennila"	Ilaiyaraaja		Mano
2001	Kanna Unnai Thedukiren	Konjum Kuyil Pattu	Ilaiyaraaja		Ilaiyaraaja, Harini
2001	Kanna Unnai Thedukiren	Rasathi Rasathi	Ilaiyaraaja		Arunmozhi
2001	Looty	"Missu Missu Papa"	Deva	Vaali	Krishnaraj
2001	Kottai Mariamman	"Sarpa Sarpamaa"	Deva		
2001	Nageswari	"Boom Boom"	S. A. Rajkumar	Muthulingam	Vadivelu
2001	Nageswari	"Gopala Yen Akka"	S. A. Rajkumar	Kalidasan	
2001	Engalukkum Kaalam Varum	"Vennai Thirudum Kanna"	Deva	Pa. Vijay	
2001	Piriyadha Varam Vendum	"Azhagu Ponnu"	S. A. Rajkumar	Palani Bharathi	Devan, Jayanthi, Krishnaraj
2001	Rishi	"Nilavai Konjum"	Yuvan Shankar Raja	Pa. Vijay	
2001	Thaalikaatha Kaaliamman	"Laser Kathir Pole"	Sirpy	Pa. Vijay	P. Unnikrishnan
2001	En Purushan Kuzhandhai Maadhiri	"Chitthiraiye"	Deva	Arivumathi	Hariharan
2001	En Purushan Kuzhandhai Maadhiri	"Pattampoochi"	Deva	Arivumathi	Mano
2001	Sri Raja Rajeshwari	"Raasave Ennai"	Deva	Viveka	Krishnaraj
2001	Asathal	"Saainthaadu"	Bharadwaj	Kalaikumar	
2001	Middle Class Madhavan	"Pakkam Nikkum Nila"	Dhina	Vaali	Pushpavanam Kuppusamy, Mano
2001	Krishna Krishna	"Moodu Vandhachu"	S. A. Rajkumar	Kovi Kovan	Krishnaraj
2001	Krishna Krishna	"Naan Orakannal"	S. A. Rajkumar	Krithaya	S. Ve. Sekhar
2001	Kunguma Pottu Gounder	"Mudhal Mudhalaa"	Sirpy	Palani Bharathi	P. Unnikrishnan
2001	Kunguma Pottu Gounder	"Naan Kulikkum"	Sirpy	Palani Bharathi	Mano
2001	Love Channel	"Cherry Cherry"	Deva	Pa. Vijay	Yugendran
2001	Poove Pen Poove	Hello Party	Subash Jawahar		Sevaththa Sampath
2002	Pammal K. Sambandam	"Endi Soodamani"	Deva	Vaali	
2002	Red	"Ollikuchi Udambukkari"	Deva	Vairamuthu	KK
2002	Vivaramana Aalu	"Adiye Aaravalli"	Deva	Na. Muthukumar	Sabesh, Chitra Sivaraman
2002	Vivaramana Aalu	"Vaada Vaada Paalkkara"	Deva	Pa. Vijay	
2002	Dhaya	"Thorakkatha Pottiye"	Bharadwaj	Pa. Vijay	Manikka Vinayagam
2002	Charlie Chaplin	"Ponnu Oruthi Summa"	Bharani	Snehan	Tippu
2002	Gemini	"O Podu"	Bharadwaj	Vairamuthu	S. P. Balasubrahmanyam
2002	Sri Bannari Amman	"Thalattu Kettathillai"	T. Rajendar		K. S. Chithra
2002	Thamizh	Rosappu'	Bharadwaj	Snehan	Yugendran
2002	Thamizhan	"Mattu Mattu"	D. Imman	Vairamuthu	D. Imman
2002	Pesadha Kannum Pesume	"Azhagamma"	Bharani	Newton	Karthik
2002	Pesadha Kannum Pesume	"Jodi Potta"	Bharani	Mani	Pushpavanam Kuppusamy
2002	123	"Adada Nadandhu Varaa"	Deva	Thamarai	Shankar Mahadevan
2002	123	"April Mazhai"	Deva	Thamarai	
2002	123	"Konjum Konjum"	Deva	Thamarai	Suresh Peters
2002	Yai! Nee Romba Azhaga Irukke!	"Poi Sollalam"	Murugan	Pa. Vijay	P. Unnikrishnan
2002	Naina	"Kaadhalane Uyire"	Sabesh–Murali	Pa. Vijay	Srinivas
2002	Maaran	"Pudi Pudi Kabadi"	Deva	Pa. Vijay	
2002	Samasthanam	"Oru Kurinji Poo"	Deva	Pa. Vijay	Krishnaraj, Srinivas
2002	Five Star	"Five Star"	Sriram Parasuram	Pa. Vijay	Shubha Mudgal, Timmy, Chinmayi
2002	University	"Jyothika Radhika"	Ramesh Vinayagam	Vairamuthu	
2002	Andipatti Arasampatti	"Panganapalli Mango"	Rock Rownder		
2002	Bagavathi	"Kai Kai Kai Vekkura"	Deva	Kalaikumar	Shankar Mahadevan
2002	Game	"Dhak Dhak"	S. P. Venkatesh	Pa. Vijay	
2002	Game	"Pesi Pesi"	S. P. Venkatesh	Pa. Vijay	Adithyan
2002	Villain	"Hello Hello En Kadhala"	Vidyasagar	Vairamuthu	Tippu, Sadhana Sargam, Clinton Cerejo
2003	Annai Kaligambal	"Omthana Namthana"	Deva	Kalidasan	
2003	Chokka Thangam	"Enna Nenacha"	Deva	R. V. Udhayakumar	P. Unnikrishnan
2003	Chokka Thangam	"Ettu Jilla"	Deva	Pa. Vijay	Karthik, Unni Menon
2003	Ramachandra	"Maidha Maidha"	Deva	Ponniyin Selvan	Tippu, Naveen, Mathangi
2003	Ramachandra	"Thillaiyadi"	Deva	Pa. Vijay	Tippu
2003	Student Number 1	"Kathal Natpai Maruma"	M. M. Keeravani	Na. Muthukumar	P. Unnikrishnan
2003	Yes Madam	"Bam Bam Barala"	Bharani	Pa. Vijay	Harish Raghavendra
2003	Military	"Therodum Veethiyile"	Deva	Palani Bharathi	Srinivas
2003	Pallavan	"Maa Venuma"	Vidyasagar	Palani Bharathi	
2003	Dum	"Kannamma Kannamma"	Deva	Kabilan	Udit Narayan
2003	Sena	"Sei Seiya Asiya"	D. Imman	Kadhalmathi	
2003	Arasu	"Aalana Dhegam"	Mani Sharma	Kabilan	
2003	Banda Paramasivam	"Lelakkadi"	Sirpy	Ra. Ravishankar	Krishnaraj
2003	Anbe Anbe	"Roobanottil"	Bharadwaj	Vaali	KK
2003	Indru Mudhal	"Vijaya Vil Vijaya"	Deva	Pa. Vijay	
2003	Lesa Lesa	"Lesa Lesa"	Harris Jayaraj	Vaali	
2003	Lesa Lesa	"Lesa Lesa (remix)"	Harris Jayaraj	Vaali	DJ Ivan
2003	Paarai	"Vinayaga Vinayaga"	Sabesh Murali	Vairamuthu	
2003	Whistle	"Whistle Adikkum Vadana"	D. Imman	Na. Muthukumar	Harish Raghavendra, Ganga Sitharasu
2003	Aahaa Ethanai Azhagu	"Ahaa Ethanai Azhagu"	Vidyasagar	Pa. Vijay	Srinivas
2003	Aahaa Ethanai Azhagu	"Kannu Rendum Konda"	Vidyasagar	Kabilan	Gopal Rao
2003	Vikadan	"Rama Rama"	Jerome Pushparaj	Pa. Vijay	
2003	Eera Nilam	"Hey Sembaruthi"	Sirpy	Kabilan	Ranjith
2003	Eera Nilam	"Karpaga Maramum"	Sirpy	Snehan	Sathya
2003	Diwan	"Konjam Konjama"	S. A. Rajkumar	Pa. Vijay	Karthik
2003	Success	"Kanna Un"	Deva	Vaali	P. Unnikrishnan
2003	Thiruda Thirudi	"Mutham Mutham"	Dhina	Pa. Vijay	
2003	Aalukkoru Aasai	"Iduppodu Sungidi"	S. A. Rajkumar	Palani Bharathi	Tippu
2003	Galatta Ganapathy	"Pondicherry"	Soundaryan	Piraisoodan	
2003	Anjaneya	"Paisa Gopuram"	Mani Sharma	Vairamuthu	Karthik
2003	Thathi Thavadhu Manasu	"Pathu Vayasule"	Deva	Vaali	
2003	Soori	"Labama Nashtama"	Deva	Vairamuthu	
2003	Indru	"Shokka Adikkura"	Deva	Yugabharathi	Tippu
2004	Ullathai Killathe	"Naan Musolini"	Deva	Pa. Vijay	Naveen
2004	Engal Anna	"Aasai Arasa"	Deva	Palani Bharathi	Shankar Mahadevan
2004	Adi Thadi	"Akkipachai"	Deva	Vaali	
2004	Kadhal Dot Com	"Unna Enakku"	Bharadwaj	Snehan	P. Unnikrishnan
2004	Ghilli	"Appadi Podu"	Vidyasagar	Pa. Vijay	KK
2004	Jana	"Pothuvaa Palarku"	Dhina	V. Elango	Karthik
2004	Super Da	"Koyambedu"	Deva	Kalidasan	Manikka Vinayagam
2004	Super Da	"Thulasi Chediyoram"	Deva	Kalaikumar	
2004	Arivumani	"Pagal Thiruda"	Janakiraj	Kalaikumar	P. Unnikrishnan
2004	Madhurey	"Elantha Pazham"	Vidyasagar	Pa. Vijay	Tippu
2004	Chellamae	"Chella Kiliyo"	Harris Jayaraj	Vairamuthu	Ranjith
2004	Gajendra	"Erumbu Onnu"	Deva	Pa. Vijay	Karthik
2004	Giri	"Dei Kaiyya Vechikittu"	D. Imman	Pa. Vijay	Devan
2004	Attahasam	"Pollachi Ilaneere"	Bharadwaj	Vairamuthu	Karthik
2004	Aai	"Ooru Onu Onnu"	Srikanth Deva	Vaali	R. Sarath Kumar, Vadivelu, Paravai Muniyamma, Jaishree
2004	Jaisurya	"Madha Madha"	Deva	Pa. Vijay	Tippu
2005	Aayudham	"Kootttan Choru"	Dhina	Pa. Vijay	Dhina
2005	Devathaiyai Kanden	"Thunda Kaanom"	Deva	Thiraivannan	Dhanush
2005	Thirupaachi	"Appan Panna Thappula"	Dhina	Perarasu	Pushpavanam Kuppusamy
2005	Kannamma	"Kichu Kichu"	S. A. Rajkumar	Vaali	
2005	Kicha Vayasu 16	"Poonai Mudi"	Dhina	Yugabharathi	Manikka Vinayagam
2005	Thaka Thimi Tha	"Etha Oothi Senjeno"	D. Imman	Na. Muthukumar	D. Imman
2005	Priyasakhi	"O Priyasakhi"	Bharadwaj	Thenmozhiyan	Srinivas
2005	6'2	"Maathengudhu"	D. Imman	Snehan	Harish Raghavendra
2005	Aadhikkam	"Ennoda Paattu"	Chandrabose	Vairamuthu	
2005	Chinna	"Kaalangathaala"	D. Imman	Palani Bharathi	KK
2005	February 14	"Un Peyar Ennada"	Bharadwaj	S. P. Hosimin	
2005	February 14	"Othhayaa Rettaya"	Bharadwaj	S. P. Hosimin	
2005	Alaiyadikkuthu	"Vilakku Vechathum"	Bharani	Yugabharathi	Krishnaraj
2005	Ponniyin Selvan	"Thachikko"	Vidyasagar	Pa. Vijay	Mathangi
2005	Thotti Jaya	"Uyire En Uyire"	Harris Jayaraj	Thamarai	Karthik, Bombay Jayashree
2005	Chanakya	"Onnu Vanguna"	Deva	Victor Das	Tippu
2005	Chanakya	"Romba Azhagu"	Deva	Kabilan	Karthik
2005	Girivalam	"Adiyae Aandaal Amma"	Deva	Piraisoodan	Ranjith
2005	Girivalam	"Solvaaya Solvaaya"	Deva	Pa. Vijay	Ranjith, Sridevi
2005	Girivalam	"Meesa Vecha Paiya"	Deva	Snehan	
2005	Sivakasi	"Ada Ennaatha Solvenungo"	Srikanth Deva	Perarasu	Udit Narayan
2005	Majaa	"Aiyyarettu Nattukatta"	Vidyasagar	Pa. Vijay	Shankar Mahadevan
2005	Vetrivel Sakthivel	"Azhaguna Azhagu"	Srikanth Deva	Lakshmi Priyan	Tippu
2005	Veeranna	"Thaali Kazhuthula"	Soundaryan	Muthulingam	Karthik
2005	Vanakkam Thalaiva	"Eppo Thara"	Deva	Pa. Vijay	Krishnaraj
2006	Saravana	"Saa Poo Three"	Srikanth Deva	Na. Muthukumar	Karthik, Harini, Baby Vaishali
2006	Aathi	"Olli Olli Iduppe"	Vidyasagar	Pa. Vijay	Karthik
2006	Idhaya Thirudan	"Goyyangoo"	Bharadwaj	Vairamuthu	
2006	Thirupathi	"Pudhu Veedu"	Bharadwaj	Perarasu	Tippu
2006	Kokki	"Summa Oru Thaali"	Dhina	Snehan	Manikka Vinayagam
2006	Thalai Nagaram	"Naan Valargirena"	D. Imman	Palani Bharathi	
2006	Kusthi	"Kalavani Kalavanipayale"	D. Imman	Raaj Kapoor	D. Imman
2006	Yuga	"Pada Pada"	Dhina	Pa. Vijay	
2006	Dharmapuri	"Engamma Kuthamma"	Srikanth Deva	Perarasu	Udit Narayan
2006	Vathiyar	"Pappalapappaa"	D. Imman	Kalaikumar	
2006	Idhu Kadhal Varum Paruvam	"Kadhal Kadhal"	Kasthuri Raja		Nitish Gopalan
2006	Aadu Puli Aattam	"Nila Nila"	Pravin Mani	Pa. Vijay	Haricharan
2006	Aadu Puli Aattam	"Gnaanapazham"	Pravin Mani	Pa. Vijay	
2006	Adaikalam	"Kalyana Sundari"	Sabesh Murali	Pa. Vijay	Shankar Mahadevan
2006	Adaikalam	"Vaankaiya Vaankikaiya"	Sabesh Murali	Pa. Vijay	Swarnalatha
2007	Veerasamy	"Vachirukken"	T. Rajendar		
2007	Deepavali	"Kannan Varum Velai"	Yuvan Shankar Raja	Yugabharathi	Madhushree
2007	Muni	"Suru Suru Susuravarthi"	Bharadwaj	P. Vijay	Ranjith
2007	Thirumagan	"Shock Adikkuthu"	Deva	Vairamuthu	KK
2007	Nanbanin Kadhali	"Aalilla Kattukkulla"	Deva	Yugabharathi	Karthik
2007	Manikanda	"Inji Murappa"	Deva	Na. Muthukumar	Tippu
2007	Manikanda	"Mama Maama"	Deva	Na. Muthukumar	Tippu
2007	Manikanda	"Pondhicherry"	Deva	Kabilan	Shankar Mahadevan
2007	Kasu Irukkanum	"Sandhaikku Pora Machan"	Kavin Saradha, Raj Shankar	Asura	Haricharan, Mohan Ram
2007	Kasu Irukkanum	Kathal Sammatham'	Kavin Saradha, Raj Shankar	Asura	Devan Ekambaram
2007	Thiru Ranga	"Pollachi"	Srikanth Deva	Pa. Vijay	Tippu, Roshini
2007	Pirappu	"Kadalaina Kadalai"	Bharadwaj	Kamakodiyan	Manikka Vinayagam
2007	Viyabari	"Feel of Kosukkadi"	Deva	Vaali	Mano
2007	Viyabari	"Kadi Kadi"	Deva	Vaali	Mano
2007	Aarya	"Ennangira Nee"	Mani Sharma	Pa. Vijay	Tippu
2007	Thoovanam	"Yedho Yedho"	Isaac Thomas Kottukapally	Vairamuthu	
2007	Manase Mounama	"Kalasu Kalasu"	Naga	Ponnadiyan	Tippu
2007	Nenjai Thodu	"Thondathe"	Srikanth Deva	Pulamaipithan	Shankar Mahadevan
2007	Piragu	"Aasai Dosai"	Srikanth Deva	Piraisoodan	
2007	Malaikottai	"Yeh Aatha"	Mani Sharma	Gangai Amaran	Tippu
2007	Puli Varudhu	"Kanava Nejama"	Srikanth Deva	Na. Muthukumar	Harish Raghavendra
2008	Pazhani	"Thiruvaroor Therae"	Srikanth Deva	Perarasu	Udit Narayan
2008	Vaazhthugal	"Unmela Aasapattu"	Yuvan Shankar Raja	Na. Muthukumar	S. P. B. Charan
2008	Indiralohathil Na Azhagappan	"Malika Cherovatra"	Sabesh Murali	Pa. Vijay	Jassie Gift, Suchitra
2008	Sandai	"Madhuraikkara"	Dhina	Sakthi Chidambaram	Udit Narayan
2008	Vedha	"Rasikkum Seemaane"	Srikanth Deva	Yugabharathi	
2008	Kuruvi	"Mozha Mozhannu"	Vidyasagar	Pa. Vijay	KK
2008	Pandi	"Pattayakilappu"	Srikanth Deva	Nandalala	Naveen Madhav
2008	Kathavarayan	"Kathavaraya"	Srikanth Deva	Snehan	
2008	Vallamai Tharayo	"Unnaithaan"	Bharadwaj	Pa. Vijay	
2008	Muniyandi Vilangial Moonramandu	"Kodangi Vanthirukken"	Vidyasagar	Vairamuthu	Manikka Vinayagam
2008	Seval	"Namma Ooru"	G. V. Prakash Kumar	Pa. Vijay	Tippu, Manikka Vinayagam, Mahathi, Shreya Ghoshal
2008	Bomalattam (D)	"Nenjil Dola"	Himesh Reshammiya		
2009	Kadhalna Summa Illai	"Joraam"	Vidyasagar	Pa. Vijay	Ranjith
2009	Satrumun Kidaitha Thagaval	"Rojavanam"	Bala	Pa. Vijay	
2009	Perumal	"Yedhaachum Sollikuvee"	Srikanth Deva	Kabilan	
2009	Aarupadai	"Mullu Illa Meenu"	Aalwarshree	Kabilan	Pushpavanam Kuppusamy, Balu
2009	Yavarum Nalam	"O Sexy Mama"	Shankar–Ehsaan–Loy	Thamarai	Jassie Gift
2009	Adada Enna Azhagu	"Deepavali"	T. M. Jayamurugan		Mano, Harish Raghavendra, Mukesh, Kalyani, Saindhavi
2009	Ragavan	"Sithanna"	Gangai Amaran	Na. Muthukumar	Haricharan
2009	Sirithal Rasipen	"Pondattiyo Vappatiyo"	Iniyavan	Snehan	Iniyavan
2009	Unnai Kann Theduthe	"Thodu Paar"	Sirpy	Pa. Vijay	
2009	Engal Aasan	"Solli Tharava"	Sabesh Murali	Pa. Vijay	Vijay Yesudas
2009	Malayan	"Tharecha Sollungo"	Dhina	Arivumathi	Tippu
2009	Anthony Yaar?	"Malakotta Kannu"	Dhina	Yugabharathi	Silambarasan
2009	Madurai Sambavam	"Kannazhaga"	John Peter	Pa. Vijay	
2009	Vedappan	"Azhagiya Azhagiya"	Nesan	Ilaya Kamban	Bellie Raj
2009	Vaidehi	"Vaidehi"	Srikanth Deva	Gemini Raghava	Prasanna Rao

=== 2010s ===
Year	Film	Song	Composer(s)	Writer(s)	Co-artist(s)
2010	Thairiyam	"Ilamaiyil Mogam"	Mohan Singh	Pa. Vijay	Harish Raghavendra
2010	Kola Kolaya Mundhirika	"Aasai Machane"	Selvaganesh	Francis Kruba	Shankar Mahadevan
2010	Magane En Marumagane	"Laddu Paiyya"	Dhina	Kiruba	Vinaitha
2010	Kattradhu Kalavu	"Indha Vaanam Indha Bhoomi"	Paul J	Yugabharathi	Hariharan
2010	Pen Singam	"Sil Silla Sil Silla"	Deva	Pa. Vijay	Shankar Mahadevan
2010	Raavanan	"Kaattu Sirukki"	A. R. Rahman	Vairamuthu	Shankar Mahadevan
2010	Thambi Arjuna	"Nalla Mazhai"	Dhina	Yugabharathi	
2010	Bale Pandiya	"Happy"	Devan Ekambaram	Vaali	Malaysia Vasudevan, Haricharan, Devan Ekambaram, Naresh Iyer, Naveen Madhav, Ranjith, Rahul Nambiar, Paravai Muniamma, Manikka Vinayagam, Srinivas, Mukesh, Divya, Suchitra Karthik, Velmurugan, Malgudi Subha, Vijay Yesudas, Aalap Raju
2010	Thottupaar	"Aadi Maasam"	Srikanth Deva	Vaali	Udit Narayan
2010	Chikku Bukku	"Thooral Nindralum"	Colonial Cousins	Vaali	Hariharan, Wadali Brothers
2010	Aattanayagann	"Chekka"	Srikanth Deva	Udit Narayan	
2011	Bhavani IPS	"Karpoora Kannazhagi"	Dhina	Yugabharathi	Kicha, Dhina
2012	Murattu Kaalai	"Sundara Purusha"	Srikanth Deva	K. Selva Bharathy	Silambarasan
2012	Kozhi Koovuthu	"Vadamallikaari"	E. S. Ramraj		Karthik
2012	Nellai Santhippu	"Kalavani Kalavani"	Yugendran	M. G. Kanniappan	Mukesh Mohamed
2012	Thiruthani	"Yamma Yamma"	Perarasu	Perarasu	T. Rajendar
2013	Jannal Oram	"Ele Malathoppu"	Vidyasagar	Yugabharathi	Velmurugan
2015	Pulan Visaranai 2	"Sozhavanthan"	Joshua Sridhar	Pa. Vijay	Karthik
2015	Thunai Mudhalvar	"Kerala Chechiyallo"	Jai	Balaji	
2018	Chekka Chivantha Vaanam	"Madura Marikozhundhae"	A. R. Rahman	Traditional	Swetha Mohan, Aparna Narayanan, Madhumitha Shankar

=== 2020s ===
Year	Film	Song	Composer(s)	Writer(s)	Co-artist(s)
2020	Pattas	"Pudhu Suriyan"	Vivek-Mervin	Uma Devi	
2020	Ettuthikkum Para	"Ushrukkul Un Pera"	M. S. Sreekanth	Snehan	Keshav Vinod
2023	Veeman	"Usure Nee"	JIT	Vidivelli	Isaiyan

== Telugu songs ==
=== 1990s ===
Year	Film	Song	Composer(s)
1995	Sogasu Chuda Taramaa	"Seetakoka Chilakalamma"	Bharadwaj
1995	Sogasu Chuda Taramaa	"Rannu Katti Pettu Pellama"	Bharadwaj
1995	Sogasu Chuda Taramaa	"Orayyo Yendammo"	Bharadwaj
1996	Bombay Priyudu	"Chandana Cheeralu"	M. M. Keeravani
1996	Pavitra Bandham	"Paatante Paata Kadhu"	M. M. Keeravani
1996	Kadhal Kottai (((D)))	"Pattu Pattu Paruvaala Pattu"	Deva
1997	Annamayya	"Ele Ele Maradala"	M. M. Keeravani
1997	Annamayya	"Vinaro Bhagyamu"	M. M. Keeravani
1997	Annamayya	"Govindasrita"	M. M. Keeravani
1997	Annamayya	"Bramha Kadigina"	M. M. Keeravani
1997	Subbaraju Gari Kutumbam	"Sree Naadulla Srumgaram"	M. M. Keeravani
1998	Aavida Maa Aavide	"Hey Vasthava Chusthava"	Sri Kommineni
1998	Aavida Maa Aavide	"Two In One"	Sri Kommineni
1998	All Rounder	"Yeppudeppudo"	Veena Paani
1998	Navvulata	"I Love You Baby"	M. M. Srilekha
1999	Kaama	"Sonali Sonali"	Adithyan
1999	Kaama	"Mohama Dahama"	Adithyan
1999	Prema Katha	"Devudu Karunisthadani"	Sandeep Chowta
1999	Devi	"Rama Chilukala"	Devi Sri Prasad
1999	Devi	"Stree Janmaku Shubavarame"	Devi Sri Prasad
1999	Devudu	Ra Chilaka Kulukula"	Sirpy

=== 2000s ===
Year	Film	Song	Composer(s)
2000	Kalisundam Raa	"Pacificlo Dooke Mante"	S. A. Rajkumar
2000	Kshemamga Velli Labhamga Randi	"Lovvuki Ageu"	Vandemataram Srinivas
2000	Chirunaama	"Chitti Chilaka"(Female)	Deva
2000	Chirunaama	"Oy Vodi Panchi"	Deva
2000	Manasu Paddanu Kaani	"Nepai Manasu"	K Veeru
2000	Manasu Paddanu Kaani	"Guppedantha"	K Veeru
2000	Ravanna	"Aadhi Somaa"	S. A. Rajkumar
2000	Yuvaraju	"Chandamama"	Ramana Gogula
2000	Oke Maata	"Kiss Me Kiss"	Koti
2000	Naagulamma	"Vidani Bandam"	Dhina
2000	Okkadu Chaalu	"Pibare Pibare"	Koti
2000	Okkadu Chaalu	"Hungamaare"	Koti
2000	Preyasi Nannu Preminchave	"College Gate"	S. A. Rajkumar
2000	Jayam Manadera	"O Chupuke"	Vandemataram Srinivas
2000	Nuvve Kavali	"Ammammalu"	Koti
2000	Maa Annayya	"Kadile Andhala"	S. A. Rajkumar
2001	Soori	"Chakkadapalli Centrelo"	Vidyasagar
2001	Murari	"Bhama Bhama"	Mani Sharma
2001	Eduruleni Manishi	"Nadumu Chus"	S. A. Rajkumar
2001	Eduruleni Manishi	"Dam Dam Dam"	S. A. Rajkumar
2001	Akka Bavekkada	"Ekkada Ekkada"	S. A. Rajkumar
2001	Ninnu Choodalani	"Ennallo Vecha"	S. A. Rajkumar
2001	Andhaala O Chilaka	"Aadina Padina"	Ghantadi Krishna
2001	Bava Nachadu	"Maatotundhi Maagada"	M. M. Keeravani
2001	Sri Manjunatha	"Oho Garaalaa"	Hamsalekha
2001	Sri Manjunatha	"Aakaashame"	Hamsalekha
2001	Sampangi	"Cheliya Ninu Chooda"	Ghantadi Krishna
2001	Naa Manasistha Raa	"Champoddhe"	S. A. Rajkumar
2001	Daddy	"Patta Pakkinti"	S. A. Rajkumar
2001	Chocolate	"Pallu Pallu Paa"	Deva
2001	Vandemataram	"Dayya Thakita"	Deva
2001	Vandemataram	"Hindusthaan"	Deva
2002	Brahmachari	"Bhama Prema"	Deva
2002	Nuvve Nuvve	"Computerlu"	Koti
2002	Gemini	"Cheli Chedugu"(Version l)	Bharadwaj
2002	Gemini	"Cheli Chedugu"(Version ll)	Bharadwaj
2002	Mahachandi	"Jolali Analede"	T. Rajendar
2002	123	"Arere Nadaka"	Deva
2002	123	"Chakkanainaa"	Deva
2002	123	"Sage O Megam"	Deva
2002	Sandade Sandadi	"Hai Hai Teen Age Seaseon"	Koti
2003	Naaga	"Oka Konte Pilla"(Version l)	Deva
2003	Naaga	"Oka Konte Pilla"(Version ll)	Deva
2003	Love In America	"Car Car"	Mano Murthy
2003	Aayudham	"Abbaa Yem"	Vandemataram Srinivas
2003	Anaganaga O Kurradu	"Vijayam Mana Sontham"	Chakri
2003	Seetayya	"Okka Magadu"	M. M. Keeravani
2005	Chandramukhi	"Annagari Maata"	Vidyasagar
2006	Bangaram	"Yegire Chilakamma"	Vidyasagar
2006	Bangaram	"Maro Masti Maro"	Vidyasagar
2006	Bangaram	"Chedugudante"	Vidyasagar
2006	Raraju	Danimma"	Mani Sharma
2006	Vikramarkudu	Vasthava Vasthava"	M. M. Keeravani
2006	Brahmastram	Machilipatnam	Vaibhav
2007	Dubai Seenu	"Suppanathi"	Mani Sharma
2007	State Rowdy	"Boppai Pandu"	M. M. Srilekha
2007	Student	"Lachumamma"	Krishna - Raja
2007	Vijayadasami	"Arey Kalyana"	Srikanth Deva
2008	Aapadha Mokkukavadu	"Paaloyamma Paalu"	Lenina Chowdary
2008	Baladoor	"Thella Cheera Ok"	K. M. Radha Krishnan
2008	Idi Sangathi	"Pattu Cheera Katti"	John P Varki
2008	Kalidasu	"Thadisi Mopedu"	Chakri
2008	Nesthama	"Chinadana"	Joy Calvin
2008	Ontari	"O Maare O Maare"	Mani Sharma
2008	Rana	"Dola Doliya"	Himesh Reshammiya
2008	Saval	"Shakamamuna"	Jassie Gift

=== 2010–present ===
Year	Film	Song	Composer(s)
2010	Bindass	"Entamma Entamma"	Bobo Shashi
2010	Ragada	"Empillo Apple O"	S. Thaman
2022	Swa	"Velledare"	Karanam Sri Raghavendra

== Kannada songs ==
Year	Film	Song	Composer(s)	Writer(s)	Co-artist(s)
1998	Yaare Neenu Cheluve	"Kushalave Kshemave"	Hamsalekha	Hamsalekha	Srinivas
1998	Yaare Neenu Cheluve	"Dayana Dayana"	Hamsalekha	Hamsalekha	Srinivas
1998	Preethsod Thappa	"Bangaradinda Bannana"	Hamsalekha	Hamsalekha	K. J. Yesudas
1998	Preethsod Thappa	"Sone Sone"	Hamsalekha	Hamsalekha	K. J. Yesudas
1998	Preethsod Thappa	"Ondu Moda"	Hamsalekha	Hamsalekha	L. N. Shastry
1998	Preethsod Thappa	"Dingu Dingu"	Hamsalekha	Hamsalekha	Malgudi Shubha, Suma Shastry, Ramesh Chandra
1998	Preethsod Thappa	"Raja Raja"	Hamsalekha	Hamsalekha	
1999	O Premave	"Cheluvinoora Chendagathi"	V. Ravichandran	K. Kalyan	Hariharan
1999	Sneha	"Surya Sutthangilla"	V. Ravichandran	K. Kalyan	Sukhwinder Singh
1999	Sambhrama	"Namaskara Ninage Bhaskara"	Hamsalekha	Hamsalekha	Ramesh Chandra
1999	Sambhrama	"Hubli Hudugi"	Hamsalekha	Hamsalekha	S. P. Balasubrahmanyam
2000	Preethse	"Surya Obba"	Hamsalekha		Suresh Peters
2001	Vande Matharam	Thayya Thakka Tha	Deva		Krishnaraj, Unnikrishnan
2001	Kothigalu Saar Kothigalu	Hai Hai Teenage	Hamsalekha		Divya, Nanditha
2001	Diggajaru	"Ela Ivana"	Hamsalekha		
2001	Diggajaru	"Komale Komale"	Hamsalekha		S. P. Balasubrahmaniam
2001	Jodi	Minchi Ninnava"	S. A. Rajkumar	R. N. Jayagopal	Mano, Anuradha Sriram
2002	Majestic	Thangali Mele	Sadhu Kokila		Rajesh Krishnan
2002	Ekangi	"Ondu Nimisha"	V. Ravichandran		S. P. Balasubrahmanyam
2002	Manasella Neene	Chakumaki Chitte"	Ravi Raj	Hamsalekha	Gurukiran
2002	Kodanda Rama	"Baalangochi Illade"	V. Ravichandran		Hariharan
2003	Raja Narasimha	"Mandakki Thinnu"	Deva	K. Kalyan	S. P. Balasubrahmanyam
2003	Vishnu Sena	Meghave Meghave	Deva	V. Nagendra Prasad	S. P. Balasubrahmanyam
2003	Hrudayavantha	Ghama Ghama	Hamsalekha		Mano, K. S. Chithra
2003	Daasa	Yavalappa Rani"	Sadhu Kokila	K. Kalyan	Rajesh Krishnan
2004	Rowdy Aliya	Yamma Yammamamma"		Kaviraj	Shaan
2004	Baa Baaro Rasika	Dheem Dheem Tanana"	Mahesh	Shashank	Hemanth Kumar
2004	Malla	Yammo Yammo	V. Ravichandran		Srinivas
2005	Pandu Ranga Vittala	Raama Naama Paayasakke"	V. Ravichandran		Srinivas
2005	Anna Thangi	Hubbaliya Shehardaage"	Hamsalekha	Hamsalekha	K.K
2005	Anna Thangi	"Thavarumane Eega"	Hamsalekha	Hamsalekha	K. S. Chithra, Madhu Balakrishnan
2005	Shastri	Style Varevaa	Sadhu Kokila		Tippu
2005	Ayya	Tabla Tabla	V. Ravichandran		Udit Narayan
2006	Thangigagi	Onde Ondu	Sadhu Kokila	A. P. Arjun	Rajesh Krishnan
2006	Suntaragaali	Kode Kode Kode Kobbari Mithayi	Sadhu Kokila	Ranganath	Jassie Gift
2006	Mohini 9886788888	"Mohini Mohini"	Hamsalekha		
2006	Mandya	"Ko Ko Ko Koli"	Gurukiran		Gurukiran
2007	Snehana Preethina	"Dhava Dhava"	V. Harikrishna	V. Nagendra Prasad	Kunal Ganjawala
2008	Indra	Raja Ninnane	V. Harikrishna	V. Nagendra Prasad	Kunal Ganjawala
2009	Hatrick Hodi Maga	"Bisi Bisi Hudugi"	Jassie Gift	K. Kalyan	
2009	Rajani	"Pizza Priya Pizza"	Hamsalekha		Kunal Ganjawala
2009	Yodha	Surya Nodayya	Hamsalekha		Suresh Peters
2009	Meghave Meghave	Nin Tutige Ondsala	V. Harikrishna		Udit Narayan
2009	Ghauttham	"Kabul Drakshi"	Gurukiran		Karthik
2009	Baaji	"Kyare Ladaki Bayi Badaki"	G. R. Shankar	K. Kalyan	Kunal Ganjawala
2010	Naariya Seere Kadda	Neere Neere Panneere	V. Ravichandran		Srinivas
2010	Modalasala	Modalasala manadolage	V.Harikrishna	Kaviraj	
2010	Silence	"Mandyada Gandige"	Vijayabharathi	Kannadiga Shivu	Rajesh Krishnan
2010	Hoo	Nee Hanga Nodabeda	V. Ravichandran	V. Ravichandran	Srinivas
2010	Hoo	Nooku Nuggalu	V. Ravichandran	V. Ravichandran	Tippu
2012	Narasimha	Hoy Narasimha Swami"	Hamsalekha		Tippu

== Malayalam songs ==
Year	Film	Song	Composer(s)	Writer(s)	Co-artist(s)
1995	Arabia	"Hamma Hamma"	Ouseppachan	Gireesh Puthenchery	Mano
1996	Madamma	"Machunaachi"	Ouseppachan	S. Ramesan Nair	Unni Menon
2000	Kannaadikkadavathu	"Engaano Sneharamam"	Balabhaskar	Kaithapram	
2001	Mazhamegha Pravukal	"Maamarakkavil"	Palakkad K. L. Sreeram	Gireesh Puthenchery	
2001	Red Indians	"I Love You"	S. P. Venkatesh	Gireesh Puthenchery	
2001	Premaagni	"Nee Paadum"	S. P. Venkatesh	K. L. Sreekrishna Das	
2001	Premaagni	"Sneha Mazhayaayee"	S. P. Venkatesh	K. L. Sreekrishna Das	
2001	Vakkalath Narayanan Kutty	"Maangalyakkalam"	Mohan Sithara	Gireesh Puthenchery	M. G. Sreekumar
2001	Aakaashathile Paravakal	"Kalabhakkuriyitta"	S. Balakrishnan	S. Ramesan Nair	P. Jayachandran, M. G. Sreekumar
2001	Maami	"Aavoolam"	S. P. Venkatesh	K. L. Sreekrishna Das	
2002	Meesa Madhavan	"Vaaleduthal"	Vidyasagar	Gireesh Puthenchery	Vidhu Prathap
2002	Level Cross	"Kannippoo Thaazhvaaram"	S. P. Venkatesh	Poovachal Khader	
2004	Priyam Priyamkaram	"Aadhya Chumbanam"	Prakash Ullyeri	Sijil Kodungalloor	
2007	Flash	"Pulari Pon Praave"	Gopi Sunder	Rafeeq Ahamed	Jakes Bejoy
2009	Seetha Kalyanam	"Seetharaman Kadhaasusaaram"	Srinivas	B. R. Prasad	Madhu Balakrishnan, Sharreth, Karthik
2009	Daddy Cool	"Samba Salsa"	Bijibal	Santhosh Verma	
2011	Makaramanju	"Mele Mele"	Ramesh Narayan	Kavalam Narayana Panicker	Ramesh Narayan
2011	Sevenes	"Ore Kinaamalarodum"	Bijibal	Rafeeq Ahamed, Santhosh Varma	Balaram Iyer
2011	Seniors	"Ithiri Chakkara Nulli"	Jassie Gift	Anil Panachooran	Jassie Gift, Imran
2012	Ozhimuri	"Vaancheeshapaalan"	Bijibal	B. Jayamohan	Bijibal, Elizabeth Raju, Jayashree Rajeev, Vivek
2012	Kochi	"Vachakannu"	Sasi Thripunithura	Shibu Chakravarthy	
2012	Gramam	"Senthamizh"	B. M. Sundaram	Gurukrupa	
2012	Gramam	"Ennai Ithoru Bommai"	B. M. Sundaram	Gurukrupa	
2013	Yathra Thudarunnu	"Koncham Koncham"	Mohan Sithara	A. K. Anil Krishnan	
2013	Ayaal	"Vadakinni Poomukhathannorikkal"	Mohan Sithara	Devadas	
2014	Vasanthathinte Kanal Vazhikalil	"Kaathunna Venaliloode"	V. Dakshinamoorthy	Anil V. Nagendran	R. K. Ramadas, G. Sreeram
2014	Pakida	"Naa Maruthu"	Bijibal	Nellai Jayantha	
2015	Saradhi	"Kuthu Kuthu"	Gopi Sunder	B. K. Harinarayanan	
2017	Rakshadhikari Baiju Oppu	"Raasaathi Ivan"	Bijibal	B. K. Harinarayanan	

== Hindi songs ==
Year	Film	Song	Composer(s)	Writer(s)	Co-artist(s)
1995	Ram Jaane	"Phenk Hawa Me Ek Chumma”	Anu Malik		Abhijeet Bhattacharya
1997	Virasat	"Jayengi Pee Ke"	Anu Malik		
1998	Chhota Chetan	"Jo Tum Kaho"	Anu Malik		
1998	Earth	"Ishwar Allah"	A. R. Rahman		
1998	Dil Se..	"Dil Se Re"	A. R. Rahman		
1998	Sar Utha Ke Jiyo	"Baadal Garajane Laga Saawan Barasne Laga"	Anand–Milind		
1998	Gharwali Baharwali	"Ek Taraf Hai Gharwali Ek Taraf Baharwali"	Anu Malik		
1998	Gharwali Baharwali	"Tara Raara Raara Ra"	Anu Malik		
1999	Biwi No.1	"Chunari Chunari"	Anu Malik		Abhijeet Bhattacharya
1999	Hum Aapke Dil Mein Rehte Hain	"Papa Main Papa Bangaya"	Anu Malik		
1999	Taal	"Ishq Bina"	A. R. Rahman		
2000	Jis Desh Mein Ganga Rehta Hain	"Prem Jaal Mein"	Anand Raaj Anand		
2001	Deewaanapan	"Satrangi"	Samir Chanda		
2001	Kuch Khatti Kuch Meethi	"Bandh Kamre Mein"	Anu Malik		
2001	Kyo Kii... Main Jhuth Nahin Bolta	"Hai Udd Gayi"	Anand Raaj Anand		
2001	Lagaan	"Lagaan Once Upon a Time in India"	A. R. Rahman		
2001	Lajja	"Aaye Aajaye Aa Hi Jaiye"	Anu Malik		
2001	Mujhe Kucch Kehna Hai	"Dupatta Mera"	Anu Malik		
2001	Rehnaa Hai Terre Dil Mein	"Na Some Ke Bangle Mein"	Anu Malik		
2002	Ab Ke Baras	"Mujhe Rab Se Pyaar"	Anu Malik		
2002	Chor Machaaye Shor	"Kaan Ke Neeche"	Anu Malik		
2002	Chor Machaaye Shor	"Chadh Gayi"	Anu Malik		
2002	Chor Machaaye Shor	"Tum Tata Ho Ya"	Anu Malik		
2002	Jeena Sirf Merre Liye	"Dupatta"	Nadeem–Shravan		
2002	Pitaah	"Rama Bachaye"	Anand Raaj Anand		
2002	Waah! Tera Kya Kehna	"Hallo Hallo"	Jatin–Lalit		
2003	Talaash: The Hunt Begins...	"Bhagra Paa Le"	Sanjeev-Darshan		
2003	Dum	"Some Day"	Sandeep Chowta	Nitin Raikwar	Leslee Lewis
2004	Netaji Subhas Chandra Bose: The Forgotten Hero	"Desh Ki Mitti"	A. R. Rahman		
2004	Maqbool	"Jhin Min Jhini"	Vishal Bhardwaj	Gulzar	Sadhana Sargam, Ustad Sultan Khan
2004	Aabra Ka Daabra	"Didave"	Himesh Reshammiya		
2005	Vaada	"Teri Kurti Sexy"	Himesh Reshammiya		Shaan
2005	Shaadi No. 1	"Chand Ko Tod Dunga"	Anu Malik		Abhijeet Bhattacharya
2009	Do Knot Disturb	"Zulfien Khol Khaal Me"	Nadeem-Shravan	Sameer Anjaan	Sonu Nigam
2021	99 Songs	"Gori Godh Bhari"	A. R. Rahman	Navneet Virk	Shweta Mohan, Alka Yagnik
2026	Hai Jawani Toh Ishq Hona Hai	"Chunnari Chunnari - Let's Go"	Akshay–IP, Anu Malik	Sameer Anjaan, IP Singh	IP Singh, Jonita Gandhi, Asees Kaur, Sudhir Yaduvanshi

== Bengali songs ==
Year	Film	Song	Composer(s)	Writer(s)	Co-artist(s)
2002	Sathi	Bolbo Tomaye	S. P. Venkatesh	Gautam Susmit	Mano
2002	Sathi	O Bondhu (Female Version)	S. P. Venkatesh	Gautam Susmit	
2003	Sangee	Alto Chhoyate	S. P. Venkatesh	Gautam Susmit	Mano
2003	Sangee	Jodi Mathay Ghomta	S. P. Venkatesh	Gautam Susmit	Mano
2003	Sangee	Sahoshay Bharosay	S. P. Venkatesh	Gautam Susmit	Mano
2003	Nater Guru	Eito Esechi Tomari	S. P. Venkatesh	Gautam Susmit	Mano
2003	Nater Guru	Thak Thak Baba Thak	S. P. Venkatesh	Gautam Susmit	Mano

== Non-film songs ==
=== Albums ===
Year	Album	Song	Language	Composer(s)	Writer(s)	Artists
1997	Chennai Girl	"Modern Ponnu"	Tamil	Sriram Parasuram; Anuradha Sriram	Narayan Parasuram	Anuradha Sriram
1997	Chennai Girl	"Kadhal Kadhal"	Tamil	Sriram Parasuram; Anuradha Sriram	Narayan Parasuram	Anuradha Sriram
1997	Chennai Girl	"Uyirin Uyir"	Tamil	Sriram Parasuram; Anuradha Sriram	Narayan Parasuram	Anuradha Sriram
1997	Chennai Girl	"Assa Assami"	Tamil	Sriram Parasuram; Anuradha Sriram	Narayan Parasuram	Anuradha Sriram
1997	Chennai Girl	"Kanavu Nanavagum"	Tamil	Sriram Parasuram; Anuradha Sriram	Narayan Parasuram	Anuradha Sriram
1997	Chennai Girl	"Ganga Mama"	Tamil	Sriram Parasuram; Anuradha Sriram	Narayan Parasuram	Anuradha Sriram
1997	Chennai Girl	"Onnu Onnu"	Tamil	Sriram Parasuram; Anuradha Sriram	Narayan Parasuram	Anuradha Sriram
1997	Chennai Girl	"Mann Vasanai"	Tamil	Sriram Parasuram; Anuradha Sriram	Narayan Parasuram	Anuradha Sriram
1997	Chennai Girl	"We are Free"	Tamil	Sriram Parasuram; Anuradha Sriram	Narayan Parasuram	Anuradha Sriram
1997	Vande Mataram	"Revival (Vande Mataram)"		A. R. Rahman	Bankim Chandra Chatterjee	Anuradha Sriram, Sujatha Mohan, Kalyani Menon, Seema
1999	Savariya	"Once Upon A Time"	Hindi	Sriram Parasuram - Anuradha Sriram	Narayan Parasuram	Sriram Parasuram, Narayan Parasuram, Viswanath Parasuram, Anuradha Sriram
1999	Savariya	"Sapna Re"	Hindi	Sriram Parasuram - Anuradha Sriram	Narayan Parasuram	Sriram Parasuram, Narayan Parasuram, Viswanath Parasuram, Anuradha Sriram
1999	Savariya	"Dil Kyon Liya"	Hindi	Sriram Parasuram - Anuradha Sriram	Narayan Parasuram	Sriram Parasuram, Narayan Parasuram, Viswanath Parasuram, Anuradha Sriram
1999	Savariya	"Blue on White"	Hindi	Sriram Parasuram - Anuradha Sriram	Narayan Parasuram	Sriram Parasuram, Narayan Parasuram, Viswanath Parasuram, Anuradha Sriram
1999	Savariya	"Tere Bina"	Hindi	Sriram Parasuram - Anuradha Sriram	Narayan Parasuram	Sriram Parasuram, Narayan Parasuram, Viswanath Parasuram, Anuradha Sriram
1999	Savariya	"Barkha Ritu"	Hindi	Sriram Parasuram - Anuradha Sriram	Narayan Parasuram	Sriram Parasuram, Narayan Parasuram, Viswanath Parasuram, Anuradha Sriram
1999	Savariya	"Mat Jaa"	Hindi	Sriram Parasuram - Anuradha Sriram	Narayan Parasuram	Sriram Parasuram, Narayan Parasuram, Viswanath Parasuram, Anuradha Sriram
1999	Savariya	"Udi Chala"	Hindi	Sriram Parasuram - Anuradha Sriram	Narayan Parasuram	Sriram Parasuram, Narayan Parasuram, Viswanath Parasuram, Anuradha Sriram
2009	Ennatiki	"Poovu Kori"(Solo)	Telugu	Vijay Karun		
2009	Ennatiki	"Poovu Kori"(Duet)	Telugu	Vijay Karun		Madhu Balakrishnan
2009	Entrentum	"Arikilumilliye"	Tamil	Vijay Karun		
2009	Sada	"Dhin Mubarak Hai"	Hindi	Vijay Karun		
2009	Enthendu	"Hoovani Arasi"(Solo)	Kannada	Vijay Karun		
2009	Enthendu	"Hoovani Arasi"(Duet)	Kannada	Vijay Karun		Madhu Balakrishnan
2022		"Nam Desamay"	Tamil	BK Kannagi	BK Kannagi	Sam Vishal, Srinisha Jayaseelan, Vikram Sai Prasad, Yogi Sekar, BK Kannagi

=== Serial songs ===
Year	Series	Song	Composer(s)	Writer(s)	Artists
2001	Soolam	"Maayi Magamaayi"	A. Johnson		
2014	Chandralekha	"Kaalaiyile Malarndhidum"	A. Johnson		
2023	Malar	"Malare Malare Devadhai Polave"			
