= Pandaga =

- VCD cover
- Directed by: Sarath
- Written by: Posani Krishna Murali (dialogues)
- Screenplay by: Sarath
- Story by: Maniswarnur
- Produced by: Ch. R. B. Chowdary
- Starring: Akkineni Nageswara Rao; Srikanth; Raasi
- Cinematography: M. Sudarshan Reddy
- Edited by: D. Venkataratnam
- Music by: M. M. Keeravani
- Production company: Jayasri Art Pictures
- Release date: 1 May 1998
- Running time: 139 mins
- Country: India
- Language: Telugu

Pandaga (transl. Festival) is a 1998 Telugu-language drama film directed by Sarath. It stars Akkineni Nageswara Rao, Srikanth, Raasi and music composed by M. M. Keeravani. It is produced under the Jayasri Art Pictures banner. It is a remake of the Malayalam film Katha Nayakan (1997).

== Cast ==
- Akkineni Nageswara Rao as Vara Prasad (Note: Character's full name is Suryadevara Lakshmi Raghava Vara Prasad.)
- Srikanth as Anand
- Raasi as Prameela
- Padmanabham as Vara Prasad's brother-in-law
- M. Balayya as Raghava
- Sudhakar as Military Officer
- Tanikella Bharani as Sai Babu
- Babu Mohan as Saidulu
- M. S. Narayana as Mallayya
- Venu Madhav as Venu
- Chalapathi Rao as Venkateswara Rao
- Rallapalli as Sambasiva Rao
- Costumes Krishna as Radha Krishna
- Chitti Babu
- Ananth as Prasad's nephew
- Gundu Hanumantha Rao
- Bandla Ganesh as Ganesh
- Tirupathi Prakash as Prasad's nephew
- Subbaraya Sharma as Lawyer
- K. K. Sarma
- Annapurna as Anasuya
- Rama Prabha as Prabhavati
- Srilakshmi as Rukmini
- Shanoor Sana
- Rajitha
- Kalpana Rai as Servant
- Nirmalamma as Koteshwaramma
- Y. Vijaya as Savitri

== Soundtrack ==
Pandaga

Film score by M. M. Keeravani
- Released: 1998
- Genre: Soundtrack
- Length: 22:40
- Label: Supreme Music
- Producer: M. M. Keeravani

M. M. Keeravani chronology
Kondattam (1998)	Pandaga (1998)	Zakhm (1998)

Music composed by M. M. Keeravani. Music released on Supreme Music Company.

No.	Title	Lyrics	Singer(s)	Length
1.	"Kondameeda Vendi Vennela"	Chandrabose	S. P. Balasubrahmanyam, Chitra	4:55
2.	"Ko Ko Kopama"	Chandrabose	S. P. Balasubrahmanyam	4:01
3.	"Bagundammo"	Sirivennela Sitarama Sastry	Mano, Chitra	4:49
4.	"Ooriki Cheppaku"	Chandrabose	S. P. Balasubrahmanyam, Chitra	4:19
5.	"Mudda Banthulu"	Chandrabose	Mano, Chitra	4:09
Total length:				22:40

== Reception ==
Griddaluru Gopalrao of Zamin Ryot gave a positive review for the film. He praised the performance of Nageswara Rao in particular in addition to Srikanth, Bharani and Babu Mohan. In a retrospective review, GVK of India Herald wrote that director Sarath has executed emotional scenes with heart.
