= Raasi (actress) =

South Indian actress

- Born: Vijaya Venkatesh; 29 July 1980 (age 46); West Godavari, Andhra Pradesh, India
- Other names: Manthra (Tamil and Malayalam)
- Occupation: Actress
- Years active: 1988–2006; 2013–present
- Spouse: Sri Muni (m. 2004)
- Children: 1

Raasi (born Vijaya) is an Indian actress known for her work in Telugu and Tamil cinema, with appearances in a few Hindi, Kannada and Malayalam films. She is credited as Manthra in Tamil and Malayalam films. Raasi gained recognition for her performances in notable films such as Subhakankshalu (1997), Gokulamlo Seeta (1997), and Pelli Pandiri (1998). She transitioned to television with Telugu soap operas, debuting in Girija Kalyanam (2020) and later appearing in Janaki Kalaganaledu (2021).

== Personal life ==
Raasi was born as Vijaya on 1982 in West Godavari district, Andhra Pradesh, India. She married film director Sri Muni.

== Film career ==
She started her career as a child artiste has grown to a level of heroine.

She also worked in the Hindi movies Angaara (1996), Rangbaaz (1996), Jodidar (1997) and Suraj (1997) with Mithun Chakraborty.

In Telugu, Raasi rose to fame with Subhakankshalu (1997). She was labelled "traditional" after Gokulamlo Seeta (1997). Later, hits like Snehithulu (1998), Pandaga (1998), Gilli Kajjalu (1998), Devullu (2000) and proved her mettle as an actress. When Raasi's career started taking a nosedive, she took to doing item numbers in Telugu films like Samudram (1999). In her prime, Raasi was one of the most sought-after actresses in the Telugu film industry.

She debuted her first Tamil film Priyam. Following a prolific year 1996, she received offers including the Vijay-starrer Love Today (1997) and the Ajith Kumar-starrer Rettai Jadai Vayasu (1997). Some of her other movies in Tamil are Periya Idathu Mappillai (1997), Ganga Gowri (1997), Thedinen Vanthathu (1997), Kondattam (1998), Kalyana Galatta (1998), Pudhu Kudithanam (1999), Kannan Varuvaan (2000), Kuberan (2000) and Simmasanam (2000). She played a negative character in Telugu movie Nijam (2003), which was directed by Teja.

After her marriage, the actress did only one film titled Suyetchai MLA before taking a long break from the cinema industry in 2006. She made a comeback with the film Onbadhule Guru after 7 years.

She is with a Telugu thriller film Lanka (2017) where she plays the central character.

She made her television debut in the Telugu soap operas Girija Kalyanam and Janaki Kalaganaledu.

In 2025, Raasi plays a pivotal role in the Tamil film Usurae.

== Filmography ==
=== Film ===
Year	Film	Role	Language	Notes
1988	Kakkothikkavile Appooppan Thaadikal	Young Lakshmi	Malayalam	Child Actress
1988	Rao Gari Illu	Chitti	Telugu	Child Actress
1989	Chettu Kinda Pleader	Nani	Telugu	Child Actress
1989	Mamatala Kovela	Hero's daughter	Telugu	Child Actress
1989	Bala Gopaludu	Lakshmi	Telugu	Child Actress
1989	Agni	Baby	Telugu	Child Actress
1990	Pachai_Kodi	Meenu (Nassar's daughter)	Tamil	Child Actress
1991	Aditya 369	Kishore's friend	Telugu	Child Actress
1993	Ankuram	Sindhura's sister	Telugu	Child Actress
1994	Palnati Pourusham	Raja Rao's daughter, Vijaya	Telugu	Child Actress
1994	Puttinilla Mettinilla	Lakshmi	Telugu	Child Actress
1996	Oho Naa Pellanta	in a song	Telugu	Child Actress
1996	Priyam	Preetha	Tamil	Debut in a lead role
1996	Angaara	Chutki	Hindi	credited as Vijaya
1996	Rangbaaz		Hindi	credited as Vijaya
1997	Evandi Pelli Chesukondi	Geetha	Telugu	
1997	Subhakankshalu	Nandini	Telugu	Debut in Telugu as a lead
1997	Suraj		Hindi	credited as Vijaya
1997	Jodidar	Landlord's daughter	Hindi	credited as Manthra
1997	Love Today	Preethi	Tamil	
1997	Gokulamlo Seetha	Sirisha	Telugu	
1997	Periya Idathu Mappillai	Priya	Tamil	
1997	Ganga Gowri	Ganga	Tamil	
1997	Thedinen Vanthathu	Janaki	Tamil	
1997	Rettai Jadai Vayasu	Anjali	Tamil	
1997	Pelli Pandiri	Kasthuri	Telugu	
1998	Kondattam	Vidhya	Tamil	
1998	Pandaga	Prameela	Telugu	
1998	Vasantha	Vasantha	Telugu	
1998	Suprabhatam	Vasundhara	Telugu	
1998	Kalyana Galatta	Pooja	Tamil	
1998	Gilli Kajjalu	Sruthi	Telugu	
1998	Snehithulu	Mahalakshmi	Telugu	
1998	Manasichi Choodu	Yamuna	Telugu	
1998	Kalavari Chellelu Kanaka Maha Lakshmi	Roopa	Telugu	
1998	Daddy Daddy	Subadhra	Telugu	
1999	Neti Gandhi	Bharthi	Telugu	
1999	Swapnalokam	Swapna	Telugu	
1999	Harischandraa	Nandini	Telugu	
1999	Veedu Samanyudu Kadhu	Mythili/Pooja	Telugu	
1999	Seenu	Herself	Telugu	
1999	Krishna Babu	Shilpa	Telugu	
1999	Samudram	Herself	Telugu	Item number
1999	Pudhu Kudithanam	Nila	Tamil	
1999	Preyasi Rave	Mahalakshmi	Telugu	Nominated-Filmfare Award for Best Actress – Telugu
1999	Pallavur Devanarayanan	Seethalakshmi	Malayalam	credited as Mantra
1999	AK-47		Telugu	
1999	Sneha	Mahalakshmi	Kannada	Debut film
2000	Postman	Sirisha	Telugu	
2000	Manasu Paddanu Kaani	Swati	Telugu	
2000	Balaram		Telugu	
2000	Kannan Varuvaan	Rajeshwari	Tamil	
2000	Oke Maata		Telugu	
2000	Shivaji		Telugu	
2000	Kuberan	Chandra	Tamil	
2000	Simmasanam	Manju	Tamil	
2000	Moodu Mukkalata	Aliveni	Telugu	
2000	Ammo! Okato Tareekhu	Gayatri	Telugu	
2000	Devullu	Nirmala	Telugu	
2001	Maa Aavida Meeda Ottu Mee Aavida Chala Manchidi	Subhadra	Telugu	
2001	Deevinchandi	Lakshmi	Telugu	
2001	Cheppalani Vundi	Vani / Rani	Telugu	
2001	Akka Bavekkada?	Sowmya	Telugu	
2002	Naga Pratista	Naga Lakshmi	Telugu	
2002	Raja	Herself	Tamil	Item number
2002	Police Sisters	Ramya	Telugu	
2002	2 Much	Geeta	Telugu	
2002	Trinetram	Vijaya	Telugu	
2002	Jamindaru		Kannada	
2002	Sandade Sandadi	Vasundhara	Telugu	
2002	Coolie		Telugu	
2002	Ninne Preethisuve	Meghamala	Kannada	
2003	Nijam	Malli	Telugu	
2003	Aalukkoru Aasai	Manthra	Tamil	
2003	Raja Narasimha	Mahalakshmi	Kannada	
2003	Sriramachandrulu	Sailaja	Telugu	
2004	Venky	Herself	Telugu	Special appearance
2004	Oka Pellam Muddu Rendo Pellam Vaddu	Satya	Telugu	
2005	Devi Abhayam	Lakshmi	Telugu	
2006	Suyetchai MLA		Tamil	
2013	Onbadhule Guru	Neelambari	Tamil	
2013	Man of the Match		Telugu	
2015	Vaalu	Mrs. Stephen	Tamil	
2016	Kalyana Vaibhogame	Parimala Devi	Telugu	
2016	Kavalai Vendam	Divya's mother	Tamil	
2016	Padesave	Swathi's mother	Telugu	
2017	Aakatayi	Vikranth's mother	Telugu	
2017	Lanka	Rebecca	Telugu	
2025	Usurae	Anasuya	Tamil	
2026	Papam Prathap	Prathap's Mother	Telugu	
2026	Garividi Lakshmi	Devudamma	Telugu	

As dubbing artiste

- Keka (2008) for Ishani
- Mirchi (2013) for Nadhiya
- Anthaka Mundu Aa Tarvatha (2013) for Madhoo
- Galipatam (2014)

=== Television ===
- Girija Kalyanam (2020–2021) on Gemini TV
- Janaki Kalaganaledu (2021–2023) on Star Maa
