= Palnati Pourusham =

- VCD cover
- Directed by: Muthyala Subbaiah
- Written by: Rajendra Kumar (dialogues)
- Based on: Kizhakku Cheemayile
- Produced by: Vijayalakshmi Mohan; Editor Mohan
- Starring: Krishnam Raju; Radhika; Charan Raj
- Music by: A. R. Rahman
- Production company: M. L. Movie Arts
- Release date: 29 July 1994
- Country: India
- Language: Telugu

Palnati Pourusham (pronounced [palnaːʈi paːuruʃaⁿ]) is a 1994 Indian Telugu-language film directed by Muthyala Subbaiah starring Krishnam Raju, Radhika and Charan Raj. It is a remake of the 1993 Tamil film Kizhakku Cheemayile. The film was released on 29 July 1994.

== Plot ==
A brother and sister share a close bond with each other. When the sister gets married, her husband dislikes the bond, due to which problems arise between the couple.

== Cast ==
- Krishnam Raju as Bheemineni Brahmanna
- Radhika as Seetha
- Charan Raj as Raja Rao
- Sudha as Saraswathi
- Suresh as Suri Babu
- Surabhi as Lakshmi
- Sanjay Bhargav as Chinna, Bheemineni Brahmanna's Son
- Tanikella Bharani as Veerayya (Pedda Paleru)
- Brahmanandam as Chinna Paleru
- Silk Smitha as Bala
- Kalpana Rai as Bala's Sister
- Kota Sankara Rao
- Master Kaushik as Veerayya's Son
- Baby Raasi as Raja Rao's Daughter
- Master Ravi as Young Bheemineni Brahmanna

== Production ==
The film was shot at the Kattunga village in Atreyapuram.

== Music ==
The soundtrack features songs composed by A. R. Rahman with lyrics by debutant Sivaganesh, D. Narayanavarma, Vennelakanti, and Jaladi. All of the songs (except O Silku Papa), were reused from the original film, Kizhakku Cheemayile.

Song	Artist(s)	Duration
"Raagaala Silakaa"	Mano, Sujatha Mohan	4:54
"O Silku Papa"	Malgudi Subha, Suresh Peters, Srinivas	4:40
"Maagaani Gattu Meeda"	S. P. Balasubrahmanyam, Shobha Shankar	5:15
"Bandenaka Bandi"	S. Janaki, Vandemataram Srinivas	4:33
"Idigo Peddapuram"	Mano, T. K. Kala, Sunandha	4:13
"Neelimabbu Kondallona"	K. J. Yesudas, K. S. Chithra	5:38
