= Girija Kalyanam =

- Genre: Drama family
- Written by: Sanjeev Megoti; Dialogues; Varaprasad; Bharathi babu
- Screenplay by: Sanjeev Megoti
- Directed by: Ramu Kona; Govind Eemani; Ravi Nagapuri
- Creative director: Bharathi babu
- Starring: Suhasini; Dharma; Akku Aakarsh; Purvii Joshi; G.V Narayana Rao
- Theme music composer: M. M. Srilekha
- Opening theme: "Girija Kalyanam"; M. M. Srilekha (vocals)
- Country of origin: India
- Original language: Telugu
- No. of episodes: 284

Production
- Executive producer: Sridevi Donepudi
- Producers: R. Suhasini; Dharma Donepudi
- Cinematography: Sankar Borra
- Editors: Ranjith Kumar Yerram; Sekhar Utakoti; Ramprasad Trivarnam
- Camera setup: Multi-camera
- Running time: 20–22 minutes
- Production company: Sri Shiva Sai Visuals

Original release
- Network: Gemini TV
- Release: 20 January 2020 – 10 April 2021

Related
- Jyothi; Madhumasam

Girija Kalyanam (Telugu: గిరిజా కళ్యాణం) was an Indian Telugu language Soap opera directed by Ravi Nagapuri aired on Gemini TV from 20 January 2020 to 10 April 2021 every Monday to Saturday at 9:30PM IST for 284 episodes. The show starred Suhasini, Dharma and Akku Aakarsh in leading roles.

== Synopsis ==
Girija, a pure hearted village girl gets deserted by her money-minded husband Akash. But circumstances force her into Kalyan’s house as his dead wife Varna, due to their uncanny resemblance. While Girija revives the lost glory of Kalyan’s business, she becomes a murder target for his enemy Indrani.

== Cast ==
- Suhasini as Girija Devi and Varna (dual role)
- Dharma Donepudi as Kalyan (Varna's husband)
- Akku Aakarsh as Akash (Girija's husband)
- Purvi Joshi as Aishwarya (Akash's fiance)
- Baby Nanditha as Loukya (Kalyan and Varna's daughter)
- Raasi as Jhansi, Police officer
- G.V Narayana Rao as Raghavaiah (Girija's and Varna's father)
- Usha Rani as Chaya devi, Kalyan's Aunt
- Goparaju Ramana
- Sravani as Indrani (Nethra's mother and Viswanadh’s sister)
- Ritu Chowdary as Nethra (Kalyan's sister in law)
- Nata Kumari as Neelaveni (Akash's mother)
- Srinivasa Rao Dandapani (Akash's father)
- Reena as Stellamma
- J L Srinivas as Viswanadh (Kalyan's father and Indrani’s brother)
- Marakala Srinu as Srinu
- Jabardast Bobby as Ravi
- Goparaju Ramana as Lakshmi Narayana (Varna's father)
- Manasa as Vidya
