= Gokulamlo Seeta =

1997 Telugu film directed by Mutyala Subaiya

- DVD Cover
- Directed by: Muthyala Subbaiah
- Screenplay by: Muthyala Subbaiah; Posani Krishna Murali (dialogue)
- Story by: Agathiyan
- Based on: Gokulathil Seethai (Tamil)
- Produced by: B. Srinivasa Raju
- Starring: Pawan Kalyan; Raasi; Harish Kumar
- Cinematography: K. Datthu
- Edited by: Gautham Raju
- Music by: Koti
- Production company: Sri Padma Sai Chitra
- Release date: 22 August 1997
- Running time: 140 minutes
- Country: India
- Language: Telugu

Gokulamlo Seeta (transl. Seeta in Gokulam) is a 1997 Indian Telugu-language drama film directed by Muthyala Subbaiah and produced by B. Srinivasa Raju under the Sri Padma Sai Chitra banner. It stars Pawan Kalyan and Raasi, with Harish Kumar in an important role. The music was composed by Koti. It is a remake of the Tamil film, Gokulathil Seethai (1996). It was a commercial success. Gokulamlo Seeta was the first film where Kalyan was credited as 'Pawan Kalyan' after he awarded the title "Pawan" in March 1997.

== Plot ==
Pawan Kalyan is a careless and spoiled son of a rich man, Muddu Krishnayya. Kalyan has every weakness that a rich and careless youth can have, and Baburao helps him in all his activities. Once, Kalyan and his friend/employee Bhaskar attend a function where Kalyan spots Sirisha singing on stage. He is impressed by her beauty and tries to woo her but doesn't succeed. At the same time, Bhaskar, too, is impressed by her and expresses his love to her but is rejected by Sirisha. A disheartened Bhaskar tries to commit suicide but is saved.

Sirisha accepts his love and leaves to see her mother to seek her blessings for their wedding. However, her mother tries to marry her off to her cousin, Sriram. Sirisha writes a letter to Bhaskar to take her away and save her from this marriage. Kalyan is shocked when he learns that Bhaskar is in love with the same Sirisha who rejected him but agrees to bring her to him. Kalyan manages to bring Sirisha to Bhaskar's house, but Bhaskar's parents oppose this marriage by insulting Sirisha. Kalyan loses his temper and hits Bhaskar's father, adding fuel to the fire. A disheartened Sirisha leaves their house but is saved by Kalyan and taken to his house.

His father and servant, Malli, suspect their relationship, and this suspicion spreads among Kalyan's friends. Sirisha accuses Kalyan of the rumors, and this brings about a change in Kalyan's attitude towards women and his life. He decides to marry Sirisha and asks his father to help him in this regard. However, his father insults her, and she returns to her mother. Kalyan, after learning of his father's mistake, reaches Sirisha's house but is discouraged by her cousin and mother. He goes on a hunger strike until she accepts his love. In the end, Muddu Krishnayya apologizes for his mistake and unites the lovers.

== Cast ==
- Pawan Kalyan as Pawan Kalyan
- Raasi as Sirisha
- Harish Kumar as Bhaskar
- Kota Srinivasa Rao as Muddu Krishnayya
- Srihari as Hari
- Achyuth as Sriram
- Brahmanandam as SI Brahmam
- Sudhakar as Broker Babu Rao
- Mallikarjuna Rao as Malli, Pawan Kalyan's servant
- Ali as Babu Rao's brother-in-law
- Rallapalli as Bhaskar's father
- Priya as Sirisha's younger sister
- Venu Madhav
- Kallu Chidambaram
- Sangeetha
- Raksha
- Rajini
- Radha Prashanthi
- Priyanka
- Ooma Sarma

== Soundtrack ==
Gokulamlo Seeta

Film score by Koti
- Released: 1997
- Genre: Soundtrack
- Length: 34:41
- Label: Lahari Music
- Producer: Koti

Koti chronology
Bobbili Dora (1997)	Gokulamlo Seeta (1997)	Korukunna Priyudu (1997)

Music was composed by Koti. Music released on Lahari Music Company.

No.	Title	Lyrics	Singer(s)	Length
1.	"Oo Andi Pilla"	Bhuvanachandra	Muralidhar, Swarnalatha	4:41
2.	"Gokula Krishna Gopala Krishna"	Sirivennela Sitarama Sastry	S. P. Balasubrahmanyam, K. S. Chithra	5:21
3.	"Andala Seemaloni"	Sirivennela Sitarama Sastry	Mano, K. S. Chithra	4:34
4.	"Podderani Lokamnidi"	Sirivennela Sitarama Sastry	K. S. Chithra	4:26
5.	"Hey Papa"	Bhuvanachandra	Mano, Malgudi Subha	5:11
6.	"Manasunna Kanulunte"	Sirivennela Sitarama Sastry	K. S. Chithra, Malgudi Subha	5:30
7.	"Prema Prema Oh Prema"	Sirivennela Sitarama Sastry	S. P. Balasubrahmanyam	4:30
Total length:				34:41

== Reception ==
A critic from Andhra Today rated the film three out of five stars and noted that "The director Mutyala Subbaiah proves his directorial prowess in handling a sensitive story but for (some dragging and unwarranted scenes) the climax".
