= Kallu Chidambaram =

Telugu film actor

- Born: Kolluru Chidambara Rao; 10 October 1945; Vizianagaram, Madras Presidency, British India
- Died: 19 October 2015 (aged 70); Visakhapatnam, Andhra Pradesh, India
- Occupation: Actor
- Years active: 1988–2013
- Children: 4
- Awards: Nandi Award, Kalasagar

Kolluru Chidambara Rao (10 October 1945 – 19 October 2015), known professionally as Kallu Chidambaram, was an Indian actor known for his works in Telugu cinema. Chidambaram is one of the finest comedians of Telugu cinema. Chidambaram started his career as a theatre artist while working as an Assistant Engineer in Visakhapatnam Port Trust. He made his film debut in 1988 with Kallu from which acquired his stage name. He had garnered the state Nandi Special Jury Award for the film.

== Early life ==
Chidambaram was born in Vizianagaram of Andhra Pradesh, India. He was married and has two sons and two daughters.

== Career ==
While working full-time as an Engineer in Visakhapatnam Port Trust, he has acted in a variety of roles in the films of directors such as E. V. V. Satyanarayana, M. V. Raghu, S.V.Krishna Reddy, and Relangi Narasimha Rao, had given him exclusively comic roles in their films. In 1995, the Telugu socio-fantasy film Ammoru, directed by Kodi Ramakrishna, brought Kallu Chidambaram critical acclaim for his performance.

== Filmography ==
=== Telugu films ===
- Kallu (1988)
- Jeevana Ganga (1988)
- Mouna Poratam (1989)
- Aarthanadham (1989) as Film Crew Member
- Muddula Mavayya (1989)
- Kondaveeti Donga (1990)
- Mama Alludu (1990)
- Chevilo Puvvu (1990)
- Teneteega (1991)
- April 1 Vidudala (1991)
- Prema Entha Madhuram (1991)
- Kobbari Bondam (1991)
- Aa Okkati Adakku (1992)
- Sahasam (1992)
- Golmaal Govindam (1992)
- Jagannatham & Sons (1992)
- Valu Jada Tolu Beltu (1992)
- Chanti (1992)
- Money (1993)
- Prema Pusthakam (1993)
- Mogudu Garu (1993)
- Joker (1993)
- Govinda Govinda (1994)
- Madam (1994)
- O Thandri O Koduku (1994)
- Prema & Co (1994)
- Kishkindha Kanda (1994)
- Srivari Priyuralu (1994)
- Sisindri (1995)
- Ketu Duplicatu (1995)
- Dear Brother (1995)
- Alibaba Adbhuta Deepam (1995) as Gandharva
- Ammoru (1995)
- Pokiri Raja (1995)
- Kuthuru (1996)
- Ladies Doctor (1996)
- Shri Krishnarjuna Vijayam (1996)
- Nalla Pussalu (1996)
- Pavithra Bandham (1996)
- Amma Ammalani Chudalani Vundhi (1996)
- Deyyam (1996)
- Mummy Mee Aayanochadu (1996)
- Gokulamlo Seetha (1997)
- Oka Chinna Maata (1997)
- Hitler (1997)
- Super Heroes (1997)
- Egire Pavuramma (1997)
- Pelli Chesukundam (1997)
- Ayyinda Leda (1997) as Mustafa
- Allari Pellikoduku (1997)
- Jai Bajarangabhali (1997)
- W/o V. Vara Prasad (1997)
- Osi Naa Maradala (1997)
- Pelli Pandiri (1998)
- Suryavamsam (1998)
- Priyuralu (1998)
- Andaru Herole (1998)
- Snehithulu (1998)
- Padutha Theeyaga (1998)
- Subhalekhalu (1998)
- Auto Driver (1998)
- Prathista (1998)
- Suprabhatam (1998)
- Maa Balaji (1999)
- Raja (1999)
- Manasu Paddanu Kaani (2000)
- Manasunna Maaraju (2000)
- Manasichanu (2000)
- Ninne Premistha (2000)
- Mrugaraju (2001)
- Eduruleni Manishi (2001)
- Fools (2003)
- Ottesi Cheputunna (2003)
- Chanti (2004)
- Swetha Naagu (2004)
- 786 Khaidi Premakatha (2005)
- Maga Simham (2008)
- Veedu Mamoolodu Kadu (2008)
- Flash News (2009)
- Pistha (2009)
- Seeta Ramula Kalyanam Lankalo (2010)
- Glamour (2010)
- Sivangi (2010)
- Graduate (2011)
- Katha Screenplay Darsakatvam Appalaraju (2011)
- Gangaputrudu (2011)
- Kalachakram (2012)
- Mythri (2012)
- Alarm (2013)
- Tholi Pata (2013)
- Aa Anthasthulo (2013)
- Premaku Sye (2013)
- Sri Sai Sankalpam (2013)

=== Other language films ===
- Time (1999 – Tamil)
- Sneha (1999 - Kannada)
- Little John (2001 – Tamil, Hindi, English)
- Raktha Kanneeru (2003 - Kannada)

=== Television ===
- Popula Pette (1997)
