= Snehithulu =

- Theatrical release poster
- Directed by: Muthyala Subbaiah
- Written by: Posani Krishna Murali (dialogues)
- Screenplay by: Muthyala Subbaiah
- Produced by: Badvelu Srinivasulu Reddy
- Starring: Vadde Naveen; Raasi; Sakshi Shivanand; Anand
- Cinematography: K. S. Selvaraj
- Edited by: Gautham Raju
- Music by: Koti
- Release date: 11 September 1998
- Country: India
- Language: Telugu

Snehithulu (transl. 'Friends') is a 1998 Indian Telugu-language romantic drama film directed by Muthyala Subbaiah and starring Vadde Naveen, Raasi, Sakshi Shivanand and Anand. The film was remade in Kannada as Sneha (1999) and in Tamil as Aasaiyil Oru Kaditham (1999).

== Cast ==
- Vadde Naveen as Murali
- Raasi as Mahalaxmi
- Sakshi Shivanand as Sirisha
- Anand as Vijay
- Sudhakar
- Ahuti Prasad as Anjanappa
- Narra Venkateswara Rao
- Chalapathi Rao
- Satyaprakash
- Ranganath
- Venu Madhav
- Tirupathi Prakash
- Bandla Ganesh
- Kallu Chidambaram
- Baby Upasana as Mahalaxmi's little sister

== Soundtrack ==
The music was composed by Koti. The songs were released under the Aditya Music label.

Track listing
No.	Title	Singer(s)	Length
1.	"Mallikavo…Menakavo"	S. P. Balasubrahmanyam, K. S. Chithra	4:09
2.	"Oh Gajjala Gumma"	S. P. Balasubrahmanyam, K. S. Chithra	5:21
3.	"Pooche Puvvuki Enno Gumagumalu"	S. P. Balasubrahmanyam, K. S. Chithra	4:09
4.	"Premisthanu Ninne Nannu"	S. P. Balasubrahmanyam, K. S. Chithra	4:55
5.	"Vanaa Vanaa Vanaa"	S. P. Balasubrahmanyam, Sujatha	4:07
6.	"Yennenni Kalalu Kannayi"	Yesudas	4:26
Total length:			27:07

== Reception ==
A critic from Deccan Herald opined that "But unlike other streotyped. mushy romances and action flicks, Snehitulu, which has its anchor in human relationships, emerges a winner, for it is shot imaginatively". A critic from Andhra Today wrote that "Although a routine story, Posani Krishna Murali lends it variety in its final twist. Good performances by the star cast combined with the director's prowess quite appeal to the audience".

== Box office ==
The film ran for a hundred days in Andhra Pradesh.

== Awards ==
Nandi Awards

- Best Male Comedian - Sudhakar
