= Moodu Mulla Bandham =

- Directed by: Muthyala Subbaiah
- Written by: Appala Chary (dialogues)
- Screenplay by: Muthyala Subbaiah
- Story by: Muthyala Subbaiah
- Produced by: Rangana Aswartha Narayana; Poonathota Raghuram
- Starring: Sarath Babu; Madhavi; Rajendra Prasad
- Cinematography: I. Dasarathram
- Edited by: P. Chandra Mohan
- Music by: Satyam
- Production company: Gomatha Art Creations
- Release date: 6 December 1980
- Running time: 134 mins
- Country: India
- Language: Telugu

Moodu Mulla Bandham (transl. Three Knot Relation) is a 1980 Telugu-language drama film directed by Muthyala Subbaiah. It stars Sarath Babu, Madhavi and Rajendra Prasad, with music composed by Satyam. It is produced by Rangana Aswartha Narayana and Poonathota Raghuram under the Gomatha Art Creations banner.

== Cast ==
- Sarath Babu as Doctor
- Madhavi as Radha
- Rajendra Prasad as Murali
- Vijayakala as Padma

== Soundtrack ==
Moodu Mulla Bandham

Film score by Satyam
- Released: 1980
- Genre: Soundtrack
- Length: 21:22
- Label: SEA Records
- Producer: Satyam

Satyam chronology
Chandipriya (1980)	Moodu Mulla Bandham (1980)	Aarani Mantalu (1980)

Music was composed by Satyam. Lyrics were written by C. Narayana Reddy. Music was released on SEA Records Audio Company.

S.No	Song title	Singers	length
1	"Aa Chupe Oka Vala"	Anand, S. P. Sailaja	4:08
2	"Kala Yeduruga Nilichinda"	P. Susheela	3:52
3	"Prati Manishiki Rendu"	S. P. Balasubrahmanyam	4:14
4	"Tulasi Kotalo"	P. Susheela	3:03
5	"Radha Krishnayya"	S. Janaki	6:05
