= Janaki Kalaganaledu =

Indian television series

- Genre: Family drama
- Developed by: Shashi Sumeet Mittal; Sumeet Hukamchand Mittal
- Starring: See below
- Country of origin: India
- Original language: Telugu
- No. of episodes: 662

Production
- Camera setup: Multi-camera
- Running time: 22 minutes

Original release
- Network: Star Maa
- Release: 22 March 2021 – 19 August 2023

Related
- Diya Aur Baati Hum

Janaki Kalaganaledu (transl. Janaki Would Not Have Dreamed) is an Indian Telugu-language family drama television series that aired on Star Maa beginning 22 March 2021. It is an official remake of StarPlus Hindi soap opera Diya Aur Baati Hum. It stars Priyanka Jain and Amardeep Chowdhary in lead roles.

== Plot ==
The story is set in Atreyapuram. The educated and ambitious Janaki dreams of becoming an IPS and her father Shiva Prasad supports her dreams. Ramachandra (Rama) is a young, partially educated confectioner from a middle-class traditional family. His mother Jnanamba is on a search of his bride whom she wants to be partially educated, responsible and an ideal housewife. Janaki's dreams are destroyed after her parents die in a boat accident due to a cyclone while Rama's marriage is arranged with the girl of Jnanamba's choice. However, the bride elopes and Jnanamba has a panic attack. After her neighbours humiliate her, Jnanamba promises to bring a daughter-in-law within 15 days.

Janaki's elder brother Yogi makes arrangements for his relocation to the US and plans to get Janaki married within 15 days. He emotionally blackmails Janaki into accepting for marriage. Yogi meets Jnanamba and family through a matchmaker and learns that Jnanamba need a partially educated daughter-in-law. To ensure Janaki's settlement, Yogi lies about Janaki's education levels and get her married to Rama. Janaki has to accept her role as an ideal daughter-in-law of the family. After her marriage, her co-sister Mallika gets jealous of her and tries to get her humiliated by Jnanamba but fails. Mallika also gets suspicious of Janaki when her suitcase has several IPS books present in it. Mallika tries to expose Janaki but fails again. Days later, Jnanamba and family visit a friend's house for a function. There, Jnanamba's friend Vyjanthi sees Janaki's way of speaking and gets suspicious about Janaki's education. She tells this to Jnanamba but Jnanamba brushes off Vyjanthi's statement and says that she would have never got her son married to an educated girl, Janaki accidentally overhears this and starts to feel angry and upset. Jnanamba also gets humiliated for not getting a grandson. She vows to get a grandson from Janaki in a year.

During the function, as there is nobody present in the house, Mallika, takes chance and goes for a movie with her friends. Meanwhile, during this time, a few robbers rob the house. When she returns, she is shocked to find the home robbed. Scared of Jnanamba's ire, Mallika cleans the house with some of the family members and makes Jnanamba believe that everything was fine and nothing of the unusual had happened. However, Jnanamba gets suspicious about her family's behavior and begins to enquire Mallika. Jnanamba finds the truth and asks Mallika to leave the house but upon her plea, Jnanamba asks Mallika's parents to visit the house. Mallika's parents came to the house but asked Jnanmba to forgive Mallika. Then, Janaki asks Jnanamba to forgive Mallika. Jnanamba accepts her request on a condition. The condition is that in case Mallika does any mistake once again, it will be Janaki leaving the house. Janaki convinces Jnanamba to forgive Mallika and she accepts under one condition that Janaki should leave the house if Mallika makes a mistake. On the other hand, Janaki, who had learnt that Jnanamba assumed her to be partially uneducated confronts Yogi for lying and decides to say reveal truth to her in-laws. However, she remains quiet after high tensions in family due to Mallika's act.

Later, Janaki begins to impress her in-laws and also learns to cook from Rama. Desperate about a grandson, Jnanamba arranges a puja and forbids the family from eating till evening. A hungry Mallika ignores the rules and Jnanamba finds about it. She asks Janaki to leave the house. However, Rama solves the issue, impressing Janaki. Jnanamba too forgives Janaki and asks her to cook for the family. Though she does not know to cook, she succeeds by watching a cooking video. Mallika spoils the food which makes it extremely spicy and salty. Before Jnananmba could eat it, Rama realizes the mistake and saves Janaki.

Jnanamba wants a grandson and leaves for a temple to let Rama and Janaki be alone. Janaki regrets hiding about her education after seeing how her family loves and respects her. She reveals the truth to Rama, who is shattered and angry at first but later recognizes Janaki's innocence in Yogi's betrayal. He hides the truth when Janaki tries to confess this to Jnanamba. Janaki enrolls in a civils coaching academy under pretext of learning to bake cakes for the development of their food shop. However, Jnanamba learns of Janaki's degree and struggles between her ego and son's life. She asks her mother-in-law Myravathi, a suggestion about whether to let Janaki be the daughter-in-law of family or ask her to leave. Influenced by Mallika's plans, Myravathi asks Jnanamba to banish Janaki but the former forgives her recognizing her sincerity under one condition that she should not study further. Meanwhile, Akhil, Jnanamba's younger son takes an interest and music and fails in his degree leaving Jnanamba agitated and she blames Janaki since the latter bought a guitar for Akhil. However, dispute gets settled and Jnanamba tries looking for grooms for her daughter Vennela. The latter is in love with Dileep. Kanna Babu, Janaki's former obsessive lover who holds a grudge against her family films Vennela and Dileep's conversation and blackmails her. Learning of this, Mallika tries to settle the dispute to earn Vennela's respect and to despise Janaki but the latter saves Mallika in turn from Kanna Babu, who charges Janaki with a case and gets her arrested. Myravathi asks Jnanamba to banish Janaki since the latter deprived the family of its reputation. Heartbroken, Janaki leaves despite Rama's plea. Meanwhile, Janaki's bus meets with an accident and the family presumes her to be dead. However, she turns out to be alive and Jnanamba welcomes her home.

Jnanamba wants her daughter Vennela to be married while Nikhil, her younger son fails in his examinations. Janaki requests Jnanamba to give Nikhil, a last chance while Vennela is revealed to be in love with Dilip. Janaki and Rama decides to have them married after Jnanamba fixes her marriage with someone else and they try to commit suicide. Janaki convinces the groom's family to stop the marriage and pretends that Dilip is her relative to have his marriage fixed to Vennela. She succeeds and the family celebrate Jnanamba and Govindaraju’s 30th wedding anniversary. Mallika recruits Leelavathi, a talkative woman of the street to insult Jnanamba for not having grandchildren. Next day, Jnanamba assumes that Janaki is pregnant and distributes sweets without talking with her landing Janaki and Rama in trouble. However, the dispute gets settled and everyone learns the truth. Now, Mallika wants to spoil Dilip and Vennela's marriage as she wants Vennela to marry her younger brother. She finds it out and exposes Vennela and Dilip's love affair on the wedding day leading Jnanamba to expel Janaki and Rama. However, Myravathi realizes their responsibility towards Vennela. But Rama gets devastated to stay away with her mother and gets worried in front of Janaki many times, so she arranges a hut in the garden of Jnanmba's house. Mallika spoils Jnanamba's mind and provokes her against Janaki. Jnananamba starts hating Janaki by thinking that she was separating her son from her. Mallika also provokes Yogi, Janaki's brother, against Jnanamba, saying that Jnanamba is committing domestic violence against his sister Janaki. For this, he files a domestic violence case in the police station, and eventually Jnanamba gets arrested. Ramachandra is shocked to learn of his mother's arrest and suspects Janaki, leaving her in tears. After Janaki compromises, his brother Jnanamba comes out of jail. Later, Yogi apologizes Jnanamba for filing the case and celebrates his son's cradle ceremony.

Later Kannababu pressures Ramachandra to repay his debt (which he made for Janaki's education unaware of Jnanamba and his family) or else he will take ownership of their sweet shop. Meanwhile, Ramachandra and Janaki gets tensed as Kannababu repeatedly blackmails them about the same thing. Janaki learns about the national chef competition and encourages Ramachandra to participate in it, so that he can repay Kannababu's debt by the cash prize and also silence the people who call him an illiterate cook. Ramachandra and Janaki go to Jnanamba and ask her permission, but Jnanamba refuses, as she fears that Ramachandra does not have much cooking knowledge and would bear the sorrow if he lost. Mallika also tries to stop them from going the competition, but Govindaraju convinces Jnanamba and she allows them to participate. Sunandha and his son Kannababu know about the same and go to the place of competition and create many hurdles for him. However, Ramachandra overcomes the hurdles and becomes the winner of the national chef competition. After finishing all the competition, the Rama will win the match but in that result some confusion will arrive.

== Cast ==
=== Main ===
- Priyanka Jain as IPS Janaki: Shiva Prasad and Aravinda’s daughter; Yogi's sister; Rama's wife & Jnanamba & Govindaraju’s daughter in law
- Amardeep Chowdhary as Ramachandra aka Rama: Jnanamba and Govindaraju’s elder son; Vishnu, Akhil and Vennela's brother; Janaki's husband

=== Recurring ===
- Raasi as Jnanamba: Govindaraju’s wife; Rama, Vishnu, Akhil and Vennela's mother
- Anil Allam as Govindaraju: Jnanamba's husband; Janaki and Mallika's father-in-law, Rama, Vishnu, Shiva Prasad’s son Akhil and Vennela's father
- Sweth as Vishnu: Jnanamba and Govindaraju’s second son; Rama, Akhil and Vennela's brother; Mallika's husband
- Vishnu Priya as Mallika:, Vishnu's wife Madhan's sister
- Nikhil as Akhil: Jnanamba and Govindaraju’s youngest son; Rama, Vishnu and Vennela's brother; Jessie's husband
- Bhavishya as Jessie: Akhil's wife
- Nehal Gangavath as Vennela: Jnanamba and Govindaraju’s daughter; Rama, Vishnu and Akhil's sister; Kishore's ex-fiancée; Dilip’s wife
- Surya as Yogi: Shiva Prasad and Aravindha's son; Janaki's brother; Urmila's husband
- Madhu Krishnan as Urmila: Yogi's wife; Janaki’s sister-in-law
- Nalini as Myravathi: Govindaraju’s mother; Rama, Vishnu, Akhil and Vennela's grandmother
- Anu Manasa as Sunandha: Kanna Babu's mother; Jnanamba's rival
- Sai Kiran Koneri as Kanna Babu: Sunandha's son, Rama's rival
- Ramya as Chikitha: Jnanamba's house help; Rajini's elder sister
- Mahathi as Vyjayanthi: Jnanamba's friend
- Master Chakri as Rajinikanth "Rajini": Chikitha's brother
- Padmavathi Addanki as Neelavathi: Jnanamba's neighbour
- C H Krishnaveni as Mallika and Madhan's grandmother

=== Cameo Appearances ===
- Prabha as herself as judge for Cookery competition in which Rama participates
- Sanjay Thumma as himself as judge for Cookery competition in which Rama participates
- Ariana Glory as herself as judge for Cookery competition in which Rama participates
- Mahesh as himself as judge for Cookery competition in which Rama participates
- Priyanka Singh as herself as judge for Cookery competition in which Rama participates
- Chitti Babu as Kanna Rao: matchmaker between Rama and Janaki
- Raja Ravindra as Shiva Prasad: Aravinda’s husband; Janaki and Yogi's father (Dead) & Govindaraju & Jnanamba’s Brother in Law
- Sheela Singh as Aravinda: Shiva Prasad's wife; Janaki and Yogi's mother (Dead)
- Manjula Paritala as Inspector Vaishnavi: Janaki's role model in her childhood
- Sireesha Vallabhaneni as Inspector Vidya: Guest for Janaki and Ramachandra's marriage
- Shanthi Reddy as Chief Guest on Janaki's Degree convocation
- Naga Manikanta as Abhi: Janaki's classmate
- Ajay Kiran as Madhan: Mallika's brother

== Reception ==
During its premiere week, the series was the fourth most watched Telugu GEC. The following week it dropped to fifth position and mostly continued to maintain it in the following weeks.

== Adaptations ==
Language	Title	Original release	Network(s)	No of episodes	Last aired	Notes
Hindi	Diya Aur Baati Hum दीया और बाती हम	29 August 2011	Star Plus	1491	10 September 2016	Original
Bengali	Tomay Amay Mile তোমায় আমায় মিলে	11 March 2013	Star Jalsha	992	20 March 2016	Remake
Malayalam	Parasparam പരസ്പരം	22 July 2013	Asianet	1524	31 August 2018	Remake
Marathi	Phulala Sugandha Maticha फुलाला सुगंध मातीचा	2 September 2020	Star Pravah	730	4 December 2022	Remake
Tamil	Raja Rani 2 ராஜா ராணி 2	12 October 2020	Star Vijay	725	21 March 2023	Remake
Telugu	Janaki Kalaganaledu జానకి కలగలేదు	5 August 2014	Star Maa	662	31 December 2025	Remake
Kannada	Radhe Shyama ರಾಧೆ ಶ್ಯಾಮ	6 September 2021	Star Suvarna	N/A	16 April 2022	Remake
