= Sneha (film) =

- Video cover
- Directed by: V. S. Reddy
- Written by: Posani Krishna Murali
- Based on: Snehithulu (Telugu)
- Produced by: Mohan Natarajan
- Starring: V. Ravichandran; Ramya Krishna; Raasi; Karan
- Cinematography: G. S. V. Seetharam
- Edited by: Shyam
- Music by: V. Ravichandran
- Production company: Chintamani Cine Arts
- Release date: 27 August 1999
- Running time: 145 minutes
- Country: India
- Language: Kannada

Sneha is a 1999 Indian Kannada language romantic drama film directed by V. S. Reddy and produced by Mohan Natarajan. The film stars V. Ravichandran, Ramya Krishna, Raasi and Karan in the leading roles. The film was a remake of Telugu film Snehithulu (1998) directed by Muthyala Subbaiah and written by Posani Krishna Murali. The music was composed by Ravichandran to the lyrics of K. Kalyan. The film spoke about the friendship between a man and woman and their troubled marital relationships.

== Cast ==
- V. Ravichandran as Murali
- Ramya Krishna as Kavya
- Raasi as Mahalakshmi
- Karan as Vijay
- Srinivasa Murthy as Vijay's father
- Doddanna as Mahalakshmi's father
- Kashi as Murali's friend
- Chitra Shenoy as Vijay's mother
- Mandya Ramesh as Jagadish
- Thalapathi Dinesh as Kavya's brother
- Rocky as Kavya's brother
- Kallu Chidambaram as servant

== Soundtrack ==
The music was composed by V. Ravichandran and lyrics were written by K. Kalyan. A total of 6 tracks have been composed for the film and the audio rights brought by Lahari Music.

Track listing
No.	Title	Singer(s)	Length
1.	"Ellide Balina Jaanapada"	K. J. Yesudas
2.	"Hrudayake Jaarida"	S. P. Balasubrahmanyam
3.	"Jeevana Ennuva"	Mano
4.	"Surya Sutthangilla"	Sukhwinder Singh, Anuradha Sriram
5.	"Chandagathi Chandada"	L. N. Shastry, Suma Shastry
6.	"Yakamma Beku Intha Loka"	K. J. Yesudas

== Reception ==
Srikanth of Deccan Herald wrote "Except the climax, the film has nothing much to say. V Ravichandran passes muster. Ramya Krishna is good but needs to watch out for the additional kilos that she has added. Raasi is okay. Doddanna is adequate. Kashi and Mandya Ramesh are hilarious. Ravichandran`s music has however shown some improvement from his earlier disasters".
