= Kuberan (2000 film) =

- Directed by: Rama Narayanan
- Written by: Pugazhmani (dialogues)
- Story by: Rama Narayanan
- Produced by: N. Radha
- Starring: Karthik; Kausalya
- Music by: S. A. Rajkumar
- Production company: Sri Thenandal Films
- Release date: 21 July 2000
- Country: India
- Language: Tamil

Kuberan is a 2000 Indian Tamil language comedy drama film directed by Rama Narayanan and produced by N. Radha. It stars Karthik and Kausalya, while Mantra, Manivannan, Anju, and Thyagu play supporting roles. The music was composed by S. A. Rajkumar.

== Plot ==
Kuberan (Karthik) works as a tour guide in Kodaikanal and is the sole money earner for a large family. The family consists of his good-for-nothing father (Manivannan); the latter's two wives and their children; and Kuberan's sister (Anju) and her unemployed husband (Thyagu). Kavitha (Kausalya), a singer, becomes a new addition to the home when she is cheated out of her money by Kuberan's father. Romance blooms between her and Kuberan, and Chandra (Mantra), who also harbors feelings for him, opts out. Kuberan and Kavitha are married, and she too takes part in the sacrifices he commits for his family.

== Cast ==
- Karthik as Kuberan
- Kausalya as Kavitha
- Mantra as Chandra
- Manivannan as Kuberan's father
- Anju as Thangam, Kuberan's sister
- Thyagu as Kuberan's brother-in-law
- Sindhu as Kuberan's aunt
- Madhan Bob
- Lalitha

== Soundtrack ==
Soundtrack was composed by S. A. Rajkumar.

| Song | Singers | Lyrics |
|---|---|---|
| "Anandha Roja" | P. Unnikrishnan, Sujatha, Swarnalatha | Viveka |
| "Kaadhalikkum Pengalukku" | P. Unnikrishnan, Anuradha Sriram | Viveka |
| "Nilavil Veedu" | P. Unnikrishnan, Sujatha | Viveka |
| "Rosave Rosave" | P. Unnikrishnan | Viveka |
| "Vaanam Vazhtha" | Sujatha | Arivumathi |
| "Vennilave" | P. Unnikrishnan, Swarnalatha | Viveka |

== Release and reception ==
Krishna Chidambaram of Kalki wrote a story means a knot must be tied and then it must be untied. This is the basic grammar of a story. No one should say that Rama Narayan, who has directed hundreds of films, does not even know this, so ten minutes before the end of the film, he ties a knot and unties in the same speed. India Info wrote, "Director Ramanarayanan, who has earlier dished out a few low budget comedy films catering to the frontbenchers, fails to raise his latest film Kuberan to even that standard. The film has a lopsided storyline with a comedy that falls flat. As for the cast, both Karthik and Kaushalya are wasted, while Manthra, as the oomph girl, manages to fare better than the others". After the film's release, Manthra held a press conference to call out Rama Narayanan for giving her false promises about the length of her role.
