= Rettai Jadai Vayasu =

- DVD cover
- Directed by: C. Sivakumar
- Written by: Pattukkottai Prabakar (dialogues)
- Produced by: N. Pazhaniswamy
- Starring: Ajith Kumar; Mantra
- Cinematography: A. Karthik Raja
- Edited by: K. Mohan
- Music by: Deva
- Production company: Bhagyam Cine Combines
- Release date: 12 December 1997
- Running time: 134 minutes
- Country: India
- Language: Tamil

Rettai Jadai Vayasu (transl. Age of double braids) is a 1997 Indian Tamil-language romantic comedy film directed by C. Sivakumar, starring Ajith Kumar and Manthra, while Goundamani, Senthil, and Ponvannan play supporting roles. The film's music is composed by Deva with cinematography by A. Karthik Raja and editing by K. Mohan. The film was released on 12 December 1997.

== Plot ==
Vijay goes to his sister's house and falls in love with her husband's half sister Anjali. Though both families agree on the marriage, Vijay's brother-in-law suddenly falls ill due to renal failure, and Vijay donates one of his kidneys to him. Thereafter, Anjali's mother opposes their marriage as she does not want her daughter to marry a man with one kidney. She also plans to marry Anjali to another prospective groom. The story forms how the lovers unite after several comical twists.

== Cast ==
- Ajith Kumar as Vijay
- Manthra as Anjali
- Goundamani as Vijay's uncle
- Senthil as Pangali
- Ponvannan as Anjali's brother
- Latha as Anjali's mother
- K. K. Soundar as Anjali's father
- Vijay Krishnaraj as Vijay's father
- Dhaarini as Jeeva's sister
- Ajay Rathnam as Jeeva
- Anu Mohan as the Bus Conductor
- Neelu Nasreen as Anjali's friend
- Prathapachandran
- Adade Manohar
- Master Adityan
- Baby Sheela as Sheela, Vijay's niece

== Production ==
The film saw the return of C. Sivakumar, who had previously directed the film Ayudha Poojai (1995), and Bhagyam Cine Arts offered him another chance. The film was briefly delayed due to the Film Employees Federation of South India strike of 1997. This was Sivakumar's second and last film as director before his death in August 2018.

== Soundtrack ==
The soundtrack was composed by Deva.

Track listing
No.	Title	Lyrics	Singer(s)	Length
1.	"Kanchipattu Chellakatti"	Vasan	Hariharan	5:15
2.	"Angel Engae"	Vasan	Adithyan, Swarnalatha	5:14
3.	"Thaam Thaketa Theemi"	Vasan	P. Unnikrishnan, Mahanadhi Shobana, Mano	5:03
4.	"Idlikku Mavu Attaiyle"	Vasan	Krishnaraj, Sabesh, Anuradha Sriram	5:31
5.	"Mattikittan Mattikittan"	Ilakkiyan	Deva, Anuradha Sriram	2:03
6.	"Vellipani Malare"	Ilakkiyan	P. Unnikrishnan	1:31
7.	"Kummunu Erukkalam Kushpoo"	Vasan	Krishnaraj, G. V. Prakash Kumar, Febi Mani	5:01
Total length:				29:38

== Reception ==
Ji of Kalki called Ajith's routine acting as the only respite and criticised the cinematography and vulgar scenes and dialogues.
