= Muthyala Subbaiah =

Indian Telugu film director

- Born: Subbaiah; 15-09-1950; K.Bitragunta, Prakasam District, Andhra Pradesh
- Education: B.com
- Occupations: Director; Writer
- Years active: 1973–Present.
- Spouse: Parvathi
- Children: 3
- Awards: Nandi Awards

Muthyala Subbaiah (born: 15 September 1950) is an Indian film director. He has directed 50 Telugu films. Known for his films with heavy dose of human emotions, he is sometimes referred as Sentiment Subbaiah.

== Personal life ==
Muthyala Subbaiah was born in K.Bitragunta, a village in Prakasam district of Andhra Pradesh. His parents are Sankaraiah, Seshamma. He is the eldest of four children. He has two sisters and a brother. He was named after his grandfather Subbaiah. Their family lived on agriculture. He used to participate in stage shows since the age of 13 years. He did his B. Com from Vidavalur. He served as the secretary of Fine Arts Association in his college.

He was married to Parvathi when he was an assistant director. They have three children, two sons and a daughter.

== Filmography ==
=== Director ===
- Moodu Mulla Bandham (1980)
- Vande Mataram (1985)
- Aruna Kiranam (1986)
- Athharintiki Daredi (1987)
- Nava Bharatam (1988)
- Sagatu Manishi (1988)
- Inspector Pratap (1988)
- Chinnari Sneham (1989) Remake of Tamil film Paravaigal Palavitham
- Mamatala Kovela (1989)
- Dharma Yuddham (1989)
- Bharatanari (1990)
- Jayasimha (1990)
- Neti Charitra (1990)
- Maa Inti Katha (1990) Remake of Kannada film Deva
- Mamagaru (1991) Remake of Tamil film Naan Pudicha Mappillai
- Samsara Veena (1991)
- Kalikalam (1991)
- Yerra Mandaram (1991)
- Bangaru Mama (1992)
- Pellante Noorella Panta (1992)
- Parvatalu Panakalu (1992)
- Repati Koduku (1992)
- Madhavayya Gari Manavadu (1992)
- Illu Pelli (1993)
- Pelli Gola (1993)
- Palnati Pourusham (1994) Remake of Tamil film Kizhakku Cheemayile
- Shrivari Priyaralu (1994)
- Anna (1994)
- Ammayi Kapuram (1995)
- Errodu (1995)
- Aadaalla Majaka (1995) Remake of Malayalam film Pidakkozhi Koovunna Noottandu
- Soggadi Pellam (1996) Remake of Tamil film Ellame En Rasathan
- Prema Prayanam (1996)
- Pavitra Bandham (1996)
- Hitler (1997) Remake of Malayalam film Hitler
- Oka Chinna Maata (1997)
- Gokulamlo Seeta (1997)
- Pelli Chesukundam (1997)
- Suryudu (1998)
- Snehitulu (1998)
- Pavitra Prema (1998)
- Manikyam (1999) Remake of Tamil film Porkaalam
- Krishna Babu (1999)
- Manasunna Maaraju (2000)
- Oke Maata (2000)
- Annayya (2000)
- Tholi Valapu (2001)
- Deevinchandi (2001)
- Raja Narasimha (2003) (Kannada)
- Aaptudu (2004) Remake of Hindi film Ghatak: Lethal
- Aalayam (2008)

=== Producer ===
- Thalli Manasu (2025)
