= Kalyana Galatta =

1998 film by Raj Kapoor

- DVD cover
- Directed by: Raj Kapoor
- Written by: Raj Kapoor
- Produced by: K. Balu
- Starring: Sathyaraj; Manthra; Khushbu
- Cinematography: Rajarathinam
- Edited by: B. Lenin; V. T. Vijayan
- Music by: Yuvan Shankar Raja
- Production company: Malar Films
- Release date: 31 July 1998
- Country: India
- Language: Tamil

Kalyana Galatta (transl. Riots in a marriage) is a 1998 Indian Tamil-language comedy film written and directed by Raj Kapoor. The film stars Sathyaraj, Mantra and Khushboo, with supporting roles played by Yuvan Shankar Raja, the film was produced by K. Balu under the Malar Films banner. It was photographed by Rajarathinam, edited by the duo B. Lenin and V. T. Vijayan, and released on 1 August 1998.

== Plot ==
Satyaraj, an orphan, becomes the guardian of a local Christian family and moves to Ooty seeking employment at a cinema theatre run by Manivannan. He lies about being married to secure the manager position and invents a fictitious wife, using a studio photograph of Kushboo. When Kushboo unexpectedly appears, mentally unstable and pregnant, Satyaraj and his friend S. Ve. Shekhar attempt to hide her while dealing with Manivannan's daughter, Manthra, who seeks to marry Satyaraj. The plot unravels as Satyaraj discovers that Kushboo is actually the eldest daughter of his adopted family and that her husband, Anandaraj, had abandoned her. The film concludes with the resolution of misunderstandings and marriages between Satyaraj and Manthra, and Kushboo and Anandaraj.

== Cast ==
- Sathyaraj as Rajagopalan
- Manthra as Pooja
- Khushbu as Jennifer / Gayathri
- S. Ve. Shekhar
- Manivannan
- R. Sundarrajan
- Vinu Chakravarthy
- K. R. Vatsala
- Anandaraj
- Fathima Babu as Commissioner's wife
- Anu Mohan
- Manobala
- Mayilsamy
- Vaiyapuri
- Suryakanth

== Soundtrack ==
The music was composed by Yuvan Shankar Raja.

Song	Singer(s)	Lyricist	Duration
"Adiye Kuruvamma"	Mano, Anuradha Sriram	Palani Bharathi	4:11
"Adhaam Yevaal"	Venkat Prabhu, Bhavatharini	Palani Bharathi	5:13
"Velli Malai"	Arunmozhi, K. S. Chitra	Palani Bharathi	5:14
"Vazhkkaiyil"	Bhavatharini, Yuvan Shankar Raja	Palani Bharathi	4:36
"Kummaalam"	Mano, Arunmozhi, Sujatha Mohan	Ravi Bharathi	3:50
"Madona Paattu"	Pop Shalini, Mano	Palani Bharathi	5:08

== Reception ==
D. S. Ramanujam of The Hindu wrote, "A pinch of parody and satire go well in the full length comedy movie of Malar Films' Kalyana Kalatta, where director Raj Kapoor who has been dealing with sentiment oriented subjects, has proved his capacity to handle a light-hearted subject. The nucleus of Jeevakumaran's story may be old but the director's screenplay and dialogue make it an enjoyable one". Ji of Kalki praised the humour but panned Yuvan Shankar Raja's music.
