= Priyam (1996 film) =

- Title card
- Directed by: N. Pandian
- Produced by: Ashok Samraj
- Starring: Arunkumar; Manthra; Prakash Raj
- Cinematography: Ganesh Ram
- Edited by: Lancy-Mohan
- Music by: Vidyasagar
- Production company: Kasthuri Film International
- Release date: 9 September 1996
- Country: India
- Language: Tamil

Priyam (transl. Affection) is a 1996 Indian Tamil-language romantic action film directed by N. Pandian and produced by Kasthuri Film International. The film stars Arun Vijay (credited as Arunkumar) alongside Manthra, while Prakash Raj plays a supporting role. It was released on 9 September 1996.

== Cast ==
- Arunkumar as Arimath
- Manthra as Preetha
- Prakash Raj as Dharma
- Vadivelu
- Vittal Prasad
- Costumes Krishna
- Sriman
- Oru Viral Krishna Rao
- Madhan Bob
- Rekha
- Kavitha
- S. N. Lakshmi

== Soundtrack ==
The soundtrack was composed by Vidyasagar. Lyricists Vairamuthu and ilakkiyan.

number	Song	Lyricist	Singers
1.	"Adaam Evaal"	Vairamuthu	Mano, Devie Neithiyar
2.	"Dilruba Dilruba"	Vairamuthu	Gopal Rao, Anuradha Sriram
3.	"Kadhal Valai"	Ilakkiyan	Gopal Rao, Sindhu
4.	"Oru Kelvi"	Vairamuthu	P. Unnikrishnan, Sujatha
5.	"Thulli Varum"	Vairamuthu	Mano, Swarnalatha
6.	"Udaiyatha Vennila"	Vairamuthu	Hariharan, K. S. Chithra

== Reception ==
The film was a moderate hit at the box office. R. P. R. of Kalki praised the music, cinematography and Prakash Raj's acting and added the film's first fifteen minutes feels dragged but the pace picks up after the arrival of Prakash Raj. D. S. Ramanujam of The Hindu wrote, "Arun Kumar and newcomer Manthra make a pleasing pair, romancing without any inhibition, Ganeshram's camera making the best use of the seashore fort and its ramparts in the song and dance portions. Prakashraj displays a lot of dash in his approach, the wolf in sheep's clothing effect being brought about without much sweat".
