= Oke Maata =

- Poster
- Directed by: Muthyala Subbaiah
- Screenplay by: Muthyala Subbaiah
- Produced by: Ambika Krishna
- Starring: Upendra; Ramya Krishna; Raasi; Nagendra Babu; Babu Mohan
- Cinematography: Dattu
- Music by: Koti
- Release date: 25 May 2000
- Country: India
- Language: Telugu

Oke Maata (transl. Only one word) is a 2000 Indian Telugu-language film directed by Muthyala Subbaiah and produced by Ambhika Krishna. The film stars Upendra, Ramya Krishna, Raasi, and Nagendra Babu. Upon release, it received negative reviews.

== Plot ==
Suryam is the leader of the fisherfolk in the coastal village of Meenampet. Rani, a fellow villager, is in love with him. However, Sireesha, a public prosecutor, becomes an obstacle to Suryam's efforts to protect the environment. Suryam, along with the fisherfolk, confronts JP, the owner of a factory that is responsible for mass fish deaths due to pollutants being released into the sea. Sireesha, acting at JP's behest, has Suryam arrested.

While in jail, Suryam recalls his past, particularly his time in law college when he and Sireesha were romantically involved. Despite her brother’s disapproval, Sireesha and Suryam plan to marry. However, Suryam’s brother, Ganagaraju, intercepts the smuggling activities of Sireesha's brother, which enrages him. He blames Suryam for marrying his sister against his wishes, leading to the murder of Ganagaraju. Sireesha’s brother frames Suryam for the crime, resulting in his arrest. The case is later dismissed due to Sireesha’s defence.

Upon his release, Suryam confronts Sireesha’s brother, learning that he was responsible for Ganagaraju’s death. In an unexpected turn, Sireesha's brother accidentally falls to his death from the upper floor of his house. Unaware of the true cause of her brother's death, Sireesha harbours a deep resentment towards Suryam.

As Suryam is released on bail, Sireesha's sister-in-law exposes her brother's shady activities. Sireesha, now aware of the truth, decides to reconcile with Suryam. The story concludes with their reunion.

== Cast ==
- Upendra as Suryam
- Ramya Krishna as Sireesha
- Raasi as Rani
- Nagendra Babu as Gangaraju
- Jayaprakash Reddy as JP
- Surya as Sirisha's brother
- Babu Mohan
- M. S. Narayana
- Achyuth

== Soundtrack ==
The music was composed by Koti.

No.	Song	Singers	Lyrics	Length (m:ss)
1	Raja Raja Chola	Devan, Sujatha Mohan	Ghantadi Krishna	4.12
2	Kolo Kolo Koilallu	Sukhwinder Singh, Gopika Poornima	Sirivennela Seetharama Sastry	5.09
3	Hatteri Butta	S. P. Balasubrahmanyam, Chithra	Ravikumar	3.49
4	Maa Manchi	Sukhwinder Singh, Shivaleela	Samavedam Shanmukha Sarma	4.15
5	Raja Raja Chola	Devan, Sujatha	Ghantadi Krishna	4.12
6	Kiss Me Kiss Me	Devi Sri Prasad, Anuradha Sriram	Chandrabose	4.52

== Reception ==
A critic for Andhra Today described Oke Maata as a below-average film with a poorly executed script, lackluster performances from the lead pair, and ineffective direction by Muthyala Subbaiah, ultimately failing to engage the audience.

A critic for Telugucinema.com reviewed Oke Maata negatively, criticizing the film for its poor performances, vulgar comedy, lengthy dialogues, and weak direction. The review also highlighted the film's lack of substance and unconvincing plot, suggesting it be erased from memory.

A critic from Indiainfo wrote "When a fresh breeze is passing filmmaking, it is sad to find a movie with an age-old revenge story. Oke Mata, Muthyalasubbaiah's sentiment and action melodrama has nothing to offer and is a best example for lack of innovativeness in filmmaking".
