= Aalukkoru Aasai =

- DVD cover
- Directed by: V. Sekhar
- Written by: V. Sekhar
- Produced by: K. Parthiban; S. Tamilselvi
- Starring: Sathyaraj; Meena; Raasi
- Cinematography: P. S. Selvam
- Edited by: A.P.Manivannan
- Music by: S. A. Rajkumar
- Production company: Thiruvalluvar Kalaikoodam
- Release date: 12 September 2003
- Country: India
- Language: Tamil

Aalukkoru Aasai (transl. Everyone has their own interests) is a 2003 Indian Tamil-language comedy drama film directed by V. Sekhar, starring Sathyaraj, Meena and Vadivelu. It was released on 12 September 2003.

== Plot ==
Arivazhagan is a man who dreams of marrying an educated, employed girl, building a dream house of his own, and having one child. Due to a trick of his scheming orthodox grandparents, he instead finds himself married to Angala – an illiterate rustic whose dreams are confined to marrying a swarthy man, having a dozen kids and visiting temples. Her dreams came true and Arivazhagan's dreams of a modern lifestyle are destroyed one by one. Meanwhile, Arivazhagan's friend Pazhani hoodwinks his own wife Govindamma Pazhani and has many affairs. As the two men cheat on their wives, a hooker Manthara develops a soft spot for Arivazhagan. Eventually, Arivazhagan and Pazhani leave their family and stay at Manthara's house for a short period. In the end, Arivazhagan happily goes back to his wife

== Cast ==
- Sathyaraj as Arivazhagan
- Meena as Angala Parmeshweri (Eshwari)
- Raasi as Manthra
- Vadivelu as Pazhani
- Kalpana as Govindamma Pazhani
- Senthil as Arivazhagan's grandfather
- Vadivukkarasi as Arivazhagan's grandmother
- Delhi Ganesh as Eshwari's father
- Sindhu as Eshwari's stepmother
- Master Mahendran as Saravanan, Pazhani's son
- Minnal Deepa as Sheela
- Besant Ravi as Rowdy

== Soundtrack ==
The soundtrack was composed by S. A. Rajkumar. Sajahan Waheed of New Straits Times felt Rajkumar "lost his magic" and called the songs "below average".

| Song | Singers | Lyrics | Length |
|---|---|---|---|
| "Belpoori Naan" | Kalpana | Kabilan | 05:11 |
| "Iduppodu Sungidi" | Tippu, Anuradha Sriram | Pa. Vijay | 05:13 |
| "Kaathal Kaathal" | Srilekha Parthasarathy, Kalpana, S. A. Rajkumar | Palani Bharathi | 04:30 |
| "Kanthan Endral Arivu" | Karthik | Nandalala | 04:28 |
| "Kottaikku Nee Raja" | S. A. Rajkumar | Ravi Bharathi | 05:16 |

== Release and reception ==
The film was released on 12 September 2003. Malini Mannath of Chennai Online wrote, "it looked like director V. Sekhar had the potential plot to build upon his story-line and to justify his title. But it doesn't quite turn out that way! After the initial promise, the script soon loses focus, the issues get muddled, and the dreams and desires of the characters take a back seat". Sify said the "family (melo) drama is outdated in story and presentation" and it "looks more like a stage play with characters speaking lengthy monotonous dialogues and has a clichéd climax". Screen wrote, "Ridiculous costumes, crude dialogues and overacting by the lead pair including Vadivelu and Kalpana who play the hero’s sidekick and his wife mar the film. Technically, the film has nothing much to offer. The redeeming feature of the film is Meena and Manthra. The latter with her hourglass figure looks sensuous.".
