= Raja Narasimha =

- VCD cover
- Directed by: Muthyala Subbaiah
- Written by: Posani Krishna Murali
- Produced by: Medikonda Venkata Muralikrishna; Smt. Medikonda Amaravathi
- Starring: Vishnuvardhan; Raasi; Ramya Krishna
- Cinematography: D. Prasad Babu
- Edited by: Kasi Viswanathan
- Music by: Deva
- Production company: Sri Venkataramana Productions
- Release date: 21 April 2003
- Running time: 133 minutes
- Country: India
- Language: Kannada

Raja Narasimha is a 2003 Indian Kannada-language romantic action film directed by Muthyala Subbaiah and written by Posani Krishna Murali. The film stars Vishnuvardhan along with Ramya Krishna and Raasi in the prominent roles. The film was produced by Medikonda Amaravathi under the Sri Venkataramana Productions banner.

The film released on 21 March 2003 to generally positive reviews from critics. However, the film failed commercially at the box office.

The same story was later used in the Telugu movie Palanati Brahmanaidu which released six weeks after the release of this film. However, that movie added few sequences which were not there in the original movie like the train moving in reverse gear.

== Cast ==
- Vishnuvardhan as Raja Narasimha
- Ramya Krishna as Soundarya
- Raasi as Mahalakshmi
- Kazan Khan as Prakash
- Annapoorna
- Avinash
- Pavitra Lokesh
- Shivaram
- Abhijeeth
- Chi Guru Dutt
- Shobaraj
- Renuka Prasad

== Soundtrack ==
The music of the film was composed by Deva to the lyrics of K. Kalyan. The song "Priya Priya" was inspired by the famous Pakistani band Junoon song "Sayonee". The song "Oh Madhuvanthi" is based on Deva's own Tamil song "Oh Madhubala" from Tamil film Madhumathi (1993).

Raja Narasimha

Soundtrack album by Deva
- Released: 2003
- Genre: Feature film soundtrack
- Label: Ashwini Audio

| No. | Title | Singer(s) | Length |
|---|---|---|---|
| 1. | "Priya Priya" | S. P. Balasubrahmanyam, Sangeetha |
| 2. | "Mandakki Thinnu" | S. P. Balasubrahmanyam, Anuradha Sriram |
| 3. | "Maharaja Rajanu" | Sujatha |
| 4. | "Naane Naane" | S. P. Balasubrahmanyam |
| 5. | "O Madhuvanthi" | S. P. Balasubrahmanyam, Sujatha |

== External source ==
- Raja Narasimha at IMDb
