= Kondattam =

- Title card
- Directed by: K. S. Ravikumar
- Written by: K. S. Ravikumar
- Produced by: P. Sambasiva Reddy; K. Jayaraman
- Starring: Arjun; Simran
- Cinematography: K. Prasath
- Edited by: K. Thanikachalam
- Music by: M. M. Keeravani
- Production company: Sai Lakshmi Movie Makers
- Release date: 6 February 1998
- Running time: 158 minutes
- Country: India
- Language: Tamil

Kondattam (Tamil pronunciation: [koɳɖaːʈʈːam] transl. Celebration) is a 1998 Indian Tamil-language drama film written and directed by K. S. Ravikumar. The film stars Arjun and Simran. It was released on 6 February 1998.

== Plot ==
Raja is a rich fun-loving man who lives alone in a bungalow and owns a company where his friends Anand, Babu and Siva work. Raja lost both his parents and often yearns for their love and affection hence he often spends time in homes of his friends. Raja often plays pranks on his friends and others however a boat ride with his friends turns tragic after his friends die in an accident. Raja is heart-broken after his fiancée Lalitha blames him for his friends' deaths. Feeling remorse for his actions, Raja transfers his properties to the families of his deceased friends. He gets a call that Anand's wife died after giving birth to a baby boy.

Raja gives the baby to Anand's family who wants him to stay in their home for some time. Except the older couple, other members initially do not like his presence but he wins their love and affection. Raja discovers that someone is attempting to kill the child. He then gets himself into a situation where he can continue staying in the house and detect the mystery.

Lalitha who is engaged to be married to Gopikrishna comes to stay in the same home and still hates Raja. During the naming ceremony of the baby, the family learns that Raja killed Anand. Arjun's servant reveals that Anand's property will be inherited by the baby. While getting thrashed by their car driver Pazhani, Raja who accidentally sees Pazhani's ring realises he was the one who attempted to kill the baby.

Pazhani was in love with Purushothaman's daughter and had an eye on the property, after coming to know that child is the heir of the property he tried to kill it. In the end, Raja marries Lalitha and becomes a part of the huge family.

== Cast ==
- Arjun as Raja (Ramu)
- Simran as Lalitha
- Manthra as Vidhya
- Gemini Ganesan as Anand's grandfather
- Vijayakumar as Purushothaman
- Dubbing Janaki as Purushottaman's wife
- Jai Ganesh as Rajarathnam
- Ramesh Khanna as Pazhani
- R. Sundarrajan as Bhaskaran
- Rajeev as Anand's uncle
- Sowcar Janaki as Janaki
- Raja as Gopikrishna
- Sathyapriya as Vidya's mother
- K. R. Vatsala as Bhaskaran's wife
- Anand Babu as Babu
- Anand as Anand
- Chinni Jayanth as Siva
- Delhi Ganesh as Raja's servant
- Saradha Preetha as Saradha
- Sheela Kaur as Anjali
- Subhashini as Anand's aunt
- Lavanya as Purushothaman's daughter
- Idichapuli Selvaraj as Watchman
- Balaji Shankar as Vidya's brother
- Master Bharath Jayanth as Pradeep
- Baby Prahasetha as Sowmya
- Neelu as priest
- Mahendran as Mahendran
- K. S. Ravikumar in a cameo appearance as photographer

== Production ==
The film was developed with the working title of Uthama Puthiran, before the team changed title. Sivaji Ganesan was initially considered to play the patriarchal head of the family, though his unavailability meant that Gemini Ganesan was selected instead. Since Ravikumar could not shoot the film in Chennai due to the 1997 FEFSI strike, he shifted the crew to Kerala and shot there but there also he faced problems while he planned to shoot at Mauritius island which did not happen; however the opposite teams who were part of strike helped the crew to shoot. Ravikumar revealed this was the first Tamil film to be shot inside Ramoji Film City, Hyderabad.

== Soundtrack ==
The soundtrack was composed by M. M. Keeravani, with lyrics by Kalidasan. The song "Mai Vizhi Un Imaigalile" is based on "Escape" by the American band The Ventures. Kondattam and Chandramukhi 2 (2023) are the only Tamil films where Keeravani was credited by his real name, unlike his other Tamil ventures where he was usually credited as Maragathamani.

Song	Singers	Length
"Ini Sudhandhira Dhiname"	S. P. Balasubrahmanyam, Maragatha Mani, Minmini, Harish Raghavendra	02:40
"Mai Vizhi Un Imaigalile"	S. P. Balasubrahmanyam, Sujatha	04:08
"Minnaladikkum Venmai"	S. P. Balasubrahmanyam, Sujatha	05:07
"Paeru Nalla Paeru"	T. S. Raghavendra, Maragatha Mani, Swarnalatha, Sujatha, Sangeetha, Srinivas	05:01
"Unnoduthan Kanaavile" (Happy)	Mano, K. S. Chithra	04:24
"Unnoduthaan Kanaavile" (Sad)	Maragatha Mani, K. S. Chithra	04:52
"Unnoduthaan Kanaavile" (Sad; film version)	S. P. Balasubrahmanyam, K. S. Chithra	04:52
"Amma Than Illaiyunu" (Note: Featured only in the film.)	M. M. Keeravani	01:00

== Release and reception ==
The film was initially announced to be released in Diwali season of 1997 but got delayed, and was released on 6 February 1998. D. S. Ramanujam of The Hindu wrote that Ravikumar "weaves an interesting and entertaining tale of family sentiments and friendship of the unusual variety, to some extent Quixotic too, in Sailakshmi Moviemakers' [Kondattam]." He added, "This film is bound to boost the stock of Arjun who shows maturity in taking on a part that requires emotional display which he does without sweating much and the fire in his action scenes have not diminished". K. N. Vijiyan wrote for New Straits Times, "It is not a bad production but not what you would expect from Ravikumar. The fun factor is grossly missing". Ji of Kalki wrote the film's central loophole is that the family members do not seem to shower affection on each other despite a very large family that is affectionate. Ji said it is understandable that Ravikumar has tried to bring a freshness to the story and scenes. According to Screen, the film, as of 6 March, "picked up at the box-office and is still keeping a steady, 70 per cent collection", but ultimately did not succeed at the box-office.
