= Pudhu Kudithanam =

- Directed by: R. Raghuvasan
- Written by: R. Raghuvasan
- Produced by: P. N. V. Thiruvenkadam
- Starring: Vignesh; Raasi
- Cinematography: V. Rajarao
- Edited by: A. P. Manivannan
- Music by: Deva
- Production company: Alwaar Ammal Movie Makers
- Release date: 7 November 1999
- Running time: 150 minutes
- Country: India
- Language: Tamil

Pudhu Kudithanam is a 1999 Indian Tamil-language comedy film directed by R. Raghuvasan. The film stars Vignesh and Raasi, with Latha, Manivannan, Senthil, Kovai Sarala and Shanmugasundari playing supporting roles. It was released on 7 November 1999.

== Plot ==
Seethalakshmi is the owner of a clothing company. She is a haughty and strict woman. Her husband Gokulakrishnan is unemployed, while her son Ashok works as a labourer in another company. Both of them are very obedient to Seethalakshmi.

Seethalakshmi would like an equally submissive daughter-in-law so that she does not influence her son, but Gokulakrishnan has another plan : he wants his son to marry a woman that he really loves. Gokulakrishnan incites his son to fall in love. As per his wish, Ashok falls in love with Nila who works in his mother's company and Nila also reciprocates his feelings. Nila has no parents and she was brought up by her grandmother. They then secretly get married with the blessing of Gokulakrishnan. Ashok and Gokulakrishnan decide to hide the secret marriage from Seethalakshmi. Ashok is now living a double life as an unmarried submissive son and as a happy husband, Ashok goes to his wife's home in the night and returns to his parents' home well before dawn. Meanwhile, Nila and Seethalakshmi become friends without knowing that they are related. What transpires next forms the rest of the story.

== Cast ==
- Vignesh as Ashok
- Raasi as Nila
- Latha as Seethalakshmi, Ashok's mother
- Manivannan as Gokulakrishnan, Ashok's father
- Senthil as Azhagu
- Kovai Sarala as Sarasu
- Shanmugasundari as Nila's grandmother
- Kumarimuthu
- Vennira Aadai Moorthy as Kalyanasundaram
- King Kong as Aruva Velu
- Tirupur Ramaswamy as Marriage Broker
- Bayilvan Ranganathan as Inspector Kalivardhan
- Ramji
- Babilona
- Singamuthu
- Omakuchi Narasimhan

== Soundtrack ==
The soundtrack was composed by Deva.

Song	Singer(s)	Lyrics	Duration
"Adi Sammatham"	P. Unnikrishnan, Anuradha Sriram	Arivumathi	5:14
"Ceylon Laila"	Sabesh, Madhavan	R. Raghuvasan	4:51
"May Maasam"	Deva	Ponniyin Selvan	5:00
"Nila Nila"	Mano	Palani Bharathi	5:30
"Nilavukku Ennadi"	Unni Menon, Harini	Thamarai	4:30

== Reception ==
A critic from Sify noted that "the film fails to raise any laughs and is worth seeing only if one is interested in viewing Mantra ooze "oomph" on screen".

== Post-release ==
Director Raghuvasan later began making a film directed Puducherry in 2007, but the film did not have a theatrical release.
