= Tanikella Bharani filmography =

Filmography of Indian actor Tanikella Bharani

Tanikella Bharani is Indian actor, screenwriter, poet and playwright who works primarily in Telugu cinema.

== As actor ==
=== Telugu films ===
Year	Title	Role	Notes
1986	Ladies Tailor	Police officer	Writer
1987	Sri Kanaka Mahalakshmi Recording Dance Troupe		
1987	Gowthami		
1987	Lawyer Suhasini		
1987	Dayamayudu		
1987	Saradamba		
1988	Siripuram Chinnodu		
1988	Varasudochadu	Columbus	
1989	Siva	Nanaji	Writer
1989	Swarakalpana		
1989	Paila Pachessu		
1989	Chettu Kinda Pleader	Pata Samanlu Buyer	
1990	Chevilo Puvvu	Paramatma	
1990	Nari Nari Naduma Murari		
1990	Jagadeka Veerudu Athiloka Sundari	Dasu	
1991	Mugguru Attala Muddula Alludu		Writer
1991	Maha Yagnam		
1991	Aditya 369		
1991	Seetharamaiah Gari Manavaralu	Govinda Rao	
1992	Bala Rama Krishnulu		
1992	Appula Appa Rao	Chilipi Donga	
1992	Mondi Modugu Penki Pellam		
1993	Prema Pusthakam	Priest	
1993	Gaayam	Lawyer Saab	
1993	Shabash Ramu		
1993	Urmila		
1993	Jeevithame Oka Cinema		
1993	Aadarsham		
1993	Rendilla Poojari		
1993	Pekata Papa Rao		
1993	One by Two		
1993	Anna Chellelu		
1993	Money	Manikyam	
1994	Palnati Pourusham	Veerayya	
1994	Money Money	Manikyam & Lawyer Saab	Writer (Script)
1994	Bobbili Simham		
1994	Namasthe Anna		
1994	Allarodu		
1994	Kishkindha Kanda	Bhetalam	
1994	Lucky Chance		
1994	Subhalagnam	Doctor	
1994	Yamaleela	Thota Ramudu	Writer (Script)
1995	Big Boss	SI Yadagiri	
1995	Sisindri	Akkanna	
1995	Gharana Bullodu		
1995	Bhale Bullodu		
1995	Alibaba Adbhuta Deepam	Kukkuteswara Rao	
1995	Desa Drohulu		
1995	Ammaleni Puttillu		
1995	Khaidi Inspector	Hitman	
1995	Bhale Bullodu		
1995	Aunty		
1995	Pokiri Raja		
1995	Miss 420		
1995	Ghatothkachudu	Thota Ramudu	Writer (Script)
1996	Vinodam	Chintamani	
1996	Maavichiguru	Lawyer Satyanandam	
1996	Pelli Sandadi	Vijay's brother-in-law	
1996	Sampradayam	Seenayya	
1996	Mummy Mee Aayanochadu		
1996	Amma Durgamma		
1996	Bombay Priyudu		
1996	Puttinti Gowravam		
1996	Akkum Bakkum		
1996	Pittala Dora		
1996	Deyyam	Psychologist	
1996	Pellala Rajyam		
1996	Once More		
1996	Sahanam		
1996	Hello Guru		
1996	Akka! Bagunnava?		
1997	Aaro Pranam		
1997	Pellichesukundam		
1997	Thoka Leni Pitta		
1997	Ratha Yatra		
1997	Mama Bagunnava		
1997	Vammo Vatto O Pellaamo		
1997	Bobbili Dora		
1997	Priyaragalu		
1997	Super Heroes		
1997	Pattukondi Chuddam		
1997	Egire Pavurama	Simhachalam	
1997	Kurralla Rajyam	Sri Rama Chandra Murthy	
1998	Pratishta	PKD aka Ponnakayila Kanna Dasu	
1998	Kalavari Chellelu Kanaka Mahalakshmi		
1998	Paradesi	Rayudu	
1998	Life Lo Wife		
1998	Pape Naa Pranam		
1998	Ulta Palta		
1998	Chandralekha	Sitarama Rao's brother-in-law	
1998	O Panaipothundi Babu	Aravindaswamy	
1998	Suprabhatam		
1998	Abhishekam	G. K. Naidu	
1999	Prema Kosam		
1999	Yamajathakudu	MP Narasimhan	
1999	Raja	Shankaram	
1999	Alludugaaru Vachcharu		
1999	Thammudu	Drunkard	
1999	Pilla Nachindi		
1999	Vichitram	Satyam	
1999	Samudram	Chepala Krishna	
1999	Aavide Syamala		
2000	Manasu Paddanu Kaani		
2000	Balaram	K.K.	
2000	Ammo! Okato Tareekhu	Gireesham	
2000	Tirumala Tirupati Venkatesa		
2000	Chala Bagundi		
2000	Manasunna Maaraju	Nagaraju	
2000	Manasichanu		
2000	Ninne Premistha		
2000	Thiladaanam		
2000	9 Nelalu		
2000	Chitram	Ramana's father	
2000	Pelli Sambandham		
2000	Durga		
2001	Sri Manjunatha	Bhrungi	
2001	Mrugaraju		
2001	Ammo Bomma	Janardhan Seth	
2001	Priyamaina Neeku	Ganesh's father	
2001	Narahari		
2001	Jaabili		
2001	Bava Nachadu		
2001	Family Circus	Fishing Inspector	
2001	Repallelo Radha		
2001	Chiranjeevulu		
2001	Nuvvu Nenu		
2001	Narasimha Naidu	Papanashanam	
2001	Snehamante Idera	Manager Appalaraju	
2001	Manasantha Nuvve	Anu's father	
2002	Priya Nestama	Surya's father	
2002	Chandravamsam		
2002	Mounamelanoyi	Mounika's uncle	
2002	Indra	Valmiki	
2002	Sreeram	Minister Subba Rayudu	
2002	Manmadhudu	Prasad	
2002	Sontham	Vamsy's father	
2002	Avunu Valliddaru Ista Paddaru	Anil's maternal uncle	
2002	O Chinadana	Lawyer Avadhani	
2002	Allari Ramudu		
2002	Okato Number Kurraadu	Swapna's father	
2002	Aaduthu Paaduthu	Gopi's father	
2002	Girl Friend	Suvarna's father	
2002	Yuva Rathna		
2002	Takkari Donga	Doobey	
2002	Prema Donga		
2002	Allari	Apartment Secretary	
2002	Neethone Vuntanu		
2002	Dhanalakshmi, I Love You	Babu Nayak	
2002	Tappu Chesi Pappu Koodu		
2003	Naaga	Viji's father	
2003	Back Pocket		
2003	Nee Manasu Naaku Telusu	Preethi's father	
2003	Gangotri	Anjaneya Shastri	
2003	Oka Raju Oka Rani	Preethi's father	
2003	Vasantham	Ashok's father	
2003	Oka Radha Iddaru Krishnulua Pelli		
2003	Okariki Okaru	Kameswara Rao's father	
2003	Missamma	Nanda Gooal's neighbour	
2003	Ela Cheppanu		
2003	Juniors		
2003	Satyam	Chakradhar	
2003	Kabaddi Kabaddi	Veerabhadraiah	
2003	Donga Ramudu and Party		
2003	Dongodu	Naidu	
2003	Ori Nee Prema Bangaram Kaanu		
2004	Vidyardhi		
2004	Jai		
2004	Grahanam	Narayana Swamy	
2004	Sye	Prudhvi's father & College Principal	
2004	Pallakilo Pellikoothuru		
2004	Koduku		
2004	Dosth		
2004	Venky	Venky's father	
2004	Samba	Nandu's father	
2004	Gowri		
2004	Mr & Mrs Sailaja Krishnamurthy	Sailaja's uncle	
2004	Intlo Srimathi Veedhilo Kumari		
2004	Malliswari	Murthy	
2004	Swamy		
2004	Oka Pellam Muddu Rendo Pellam Vaddu	Sarvarayudu	
2004	Love Today		
2005	Youth	Priest	
2005	Jagapati	Kunkumaiah	
2005	Nuvvostanante Nenoddantana	Kantepudi Srinivasa Rao	
2005	Narasimhudu	Lawyer	
2005	Dhana 51		
2005	Nireekshana		
2005	Chakram	Lakshmi (Asin)'s father	
2005	Manasu Maata Vinadhu		
2005	Allari Pidugu		
2005	Bhadra		
2005	Sada Mee Sevalo	Kanaka Rao	
2005	Kanchanamala Cable TV	Criminal lawyer	
2005	Modati Cinema		
2005	Hungama	Chinna Babu	
2005	Political Rowdy	Vittal's uncle	
2005	Dhairyam	Bonala Bikshapati	
2005	Relax		
2005	Balu ABCDEFG	Beggar	
2005	Subhash Chandra Bose	Bapiveedu	
2005	Allari Bullodu	Raju's father	
2005	Athadu	Naidu	
2006	Chukkallo Chandrudu	Shravani's uncle	
2006	Godavari	Captain Chintamani	
2006	Annavaram		
2006	Amma Cheppindi	Paparao	
2006	Bangaram	Channel chief	
2006	Game	Lawyer	
2006	Something Special		
2006	Oka V Chitram	Devam	
2006	Pournami	Mallika's father	
2006	Happy	Subba Rao	
2006	Bhagyalakshmi Bumper Draw	Paala Pullaiah	
2006	Maayajaalam		
2006	Kithakithalu		
2006	Indian Beauty	himself	
2007	Okkadunnadu	Reserve Bank Official	
2007	Pagale Vennela		
2007	Raju Bhai	Anjali's father	
2007	Anumanaspadam	Forest Officer	
2007	Mee Sreyobhilashi	Hotel Owner	
2007	Bhookailas		
2007	Sri Mahalakshmi	Bavaji Rao	
2007	Dhee	Corporator Krishna	
2007	Jagadam	MLA PVR	
2007	Chirutha	Charan's uncle	
2007	Classmates	Hostel warden	
2007	Nava Vasantham	Raja's father	
2008	Salute	Divya's father	
2008	Kathanayakudu	School teacher	
2008	Bommana Brothers Chandana Sisters	Bommana Brothers' father	
2008	Kousalya Supraja Rama	Narasimham	
2008	Bujjigadu		
2008	Kasipatnam Choodarababu		
2008	Ullasamga Utsahamga		
2008	Jalsa	Bulli Reddy	
2008	Victory	Vijji's father	
2008	Somberi	Kavi	
2008	Ashta Chemma	Sarva Sarma	
2008	Nenu Meeku Telusa?	Company MD	
2009	Nirnayam 2009		
2009	Pista	Suryaprakash's assistant	
2009	Kurradu	Varun's father	
2009	Mitrudu		
2009	Kalavaramaye Madilo		
2009	Current	Sushanth's father	
2009	Boni	Giri	
2009	Ek Niranjan	Veeraiah	
2009	Rechipo		
2009	Sontha Vooru	Devudu	
2009	Adugu		
2009	Souryam	Karim	
2009	Oye	Telugu teacher	
2010	Gudu Gudu Gunjam		
2010	Rakta Charitra	Padalaneni Ramamurthy	
2010	Rakta Charitra 2	Padalaneni Ramamurthy	
2010	Gaayam 2	Lawyer Saab	
2010	Shambo Shiva Shambo	Muniamma's father	
2010	Jhummandi Naadam	Balu's father	
2010	Collector Gaari Bharya	Politician	
2010	Leader	Chief Secretary Sharma	
2010	Adhurs	Chari's father	
2010	Ragada	Devudu	
2010	Kedi	Rummy's father	
2010	Killer		
2010	Sadhyam	Krishna Prasad	
2010	Bhairava IPS		
2010	Khaleja	Durga Prasad	
2010	Brindavaanam	Ajay's father	
2010	Aunty Uncle Nandagopal		
2011	Dookudu	Ajay's uncle	
2011	Oosaravelli	Rakesh's father	
2011	Aakasame Haddu	Keerthi's father	
2011	Dushasana		
2011	Killer		
2011	180	Narayanan	
2011	Mr. Rascal		
2011	Kudirithe Kappu Coffee	Mohan	
2011	Play		
2011	Golconda High School	Principal Viswanath	
2011	Emaindi Nalo		
2011	Vastadu Naa Raju		
2011	Katha Screenplay Darshakatvam Appalaraju	Y. Venkat	
2011	Dhada	Preethi's father	
2011	Panjaa	Guruvayya	
2011	Teen Maar	Michael's father	
2011	Rajendra		
2011	Kshetram	Priest	
2012	Yugam		
2012	Julayi	Narayana Moorti	
2012	Dhammu	Head Priest	
2012	Yamudiki Mogudu	Royyala Ramanaidu	
2012	Mithunam		Also director
2012	Tea Samosa Biscuit		
2012	Vesavi Selavullo		
2012	Kartika Masam		
2012	Dhoni	Karthick's school principal	
2012	Gabbar Singh	Siddhappa Naidu's uncle	
2012	Cameraman Gangatho Rambabu	Rana Prathap Naidu's uncle	
2012	Om Sairam		
2012	Rakshith		
2012	Keeravani		
2013	Ramayya Vasthavayya	Amulu's father	
2013	Thoofan	Jayadev	
2013	Sukumarudu		
2013	Baadshah	Pilli Gopi Krishna Simha	
2013	Iddarammayilatho	Shankarabharanam	
2013	Seethamma Vakitlo Sirimalle Chettu	Kondala Rao	
2013	Naayak	Judge	
2013	Jagadguru Adi Shankara	Agni Deva	
2014	Basanti	Arjun's father	
2014	Karthikeya	Valli's father	
2014	Current Theega	Chandraiah	
2014	Rowdy	Vedantham Murthy	
2014	Race Gurram	Lucky's father	
2014	Aagadu	Adi Keshavulu	
2014	Alludu Seenu	Narasimha's friend	
2014	Ra Ra... Krishnayya	Manikyam Mogiliyar	
2015	Size Zero	Doctor	
2015	Baahubali: The Beginning	Swamiji	
2015	Temper	Venkat Rao	
2015	Surya vs Surya	Ersam	
2015	Kick 2	Venkatratnam	
2015	Bandipotu	Makrandam	
2015	Moodu Mukkallo Cheppalante	Dayanidhi	
2015	Mantra 2	Ramarao	
2015	Janda Pai Kapiraju	MP	
2015	Ori Devidoy		
2015	Areyrey		
2015	Rey		
2015	Bruce Lee – The Fighter	Ravi's father & Rama Chandra Rao's Big Brother	
2016	Oopiri	Kaalidasu	
2016	Ekkadiki Pothavu Chinnavada	Amala's Father	
2016	Sardaar Gabbar Singh	Gabbar Singh's Guardian	
2016	Ism	Dasaradharamaiah	
2016	Gentleman	Mohan, Jayaram's uncle	
2016	Naruda Donoruda	Dr. Anjeneyulu	
2016	Brahmotsavam	Chantibabu's friend	
2016	Jyo Achyutananda	Sudoku Murthy	
2016	Srirastu Subhamastu	Anu's would-be father-in-law	
2016	Supreme	Police Commissioner	
2016	Nenu Maa College		
2017	Luckunnodu	Padma's Father	
2017	Samanthakamani	A. K. Ganapathi Sastry	
2017	Raja The Great	Mailaramgadda	
2017	Babu Baga Busy	Madhav's father	
2017	Nene Raju Nene Mantri	Chief Minister	
2017	Ninnu Kori	Murthy	
2017	Duvvada Jagannadham	Duvvada Subramaniam Sastry	
2017	Ami Thumi	Janardhan	
2017	Radha	Radha Krishna's father	
2017	Guru	Murali	
2017	Om Namo Venkatesaya	Des Raj Baljot	
2017	Goutham Nanda	Waiter	
2017	Anando Brahma	Manikyam	
2017	Sathamanam Bhavati	Chalaram	Cameo appearance
2017	Gautamiputra Satakarni	Deva Dattudu	
2017	Gulf	Sufi song singer	
2018	Amar Akbar Anthony	Himself	Cameo appearance
2018	Vijetha	Mohan Prasad	
2018	Pantham	Tilak	
2018	Sammohanam	Shyam Prasad	
2018	Jamba Lakidi Pamba	Varun's father	
2018	Naa... Nuvve	Meera's father	
2018	Mahanati	Journalist	
2018	Nela Ticket	Chief Minister	
2018	Gayatri	Lawyer	
2018	Agnyaathavaasi	Appaji	
2019	Sye Raa Narasimha Reddy	Swamiji Govindayya Sharma	
2019	Krishnarao Supermarket		
2019	2 Hours Love	Tanikella	
2019	Gaddalakonda Ganesh	Theatre Operator	
2019	1st Rank Raju	Coordinator	
2019	Sita	Jayababu	
2019	Maharshi	Ravi's father	
2019	Saaho	Ramaswamy Allagadda	
2020	Ala Vaikunthapurramloo	Anjaneya Prasad	
2020	Sarileru Neekevvaru	Minister	
2020	Entha Manchivaadavuraa	Rama Sharma	
2020	Jaanu	T. Venkateswara Rao	
2020	Pressure Cooker	Anand Rao	
2020	V	IGP Y. V. Narendra	
2020	Maa Vintha Gadha Vinuma	Police Officer	
2020	Bombhaat	Varaha Murthy	
2021	April 28 Em Jarigindi		
2021	Bangaru Bullodu	Bhavani's grandfather	
2021	Gaali Sampath	Station Master	
2021	Mosagallu	Mukund	
2021	Jathi Ratnalu	Govindu	
2021	Chaavu Kaburu Challaga	Balaraju's uncle	
2021	SR Kalyanamandapam	College Principal	
2021	Raja Raja Chora	Ghanapati	
2021	Raja Vikramarka	Mahendra	
2021	Drushyam 2	Vinayachandran	
2021	Deyyam		
2021	Ippudu Kaaka Inkeppudu		
2021	Skylab	Sadashivam	
2022	Son of India	Home Minister	
2022	Bheemla Nayak	MLA	
2022	Ghani	Maya's father	
2022	Acharya	Priest	
2022	Sarkaru Vaari Paata	Master	
2022	F3	Police officer	
2022	Geetha		
2022	Bimbisara	Priest	
2022	First Day First Show	Dharmaraju	
2022	Dhamaka	Vasudeva Rao	
2023	Premadesam	Maya's father	
2023	Mr. King	Professor	
2023	Sir	Deekshitulu	
2023	Bro	Krishnamoorthy "Singinaatham Mavayya"	
2023	Peddha Kapu 1		
2023	Spy	Jai and Subhash's father	
2024	Inti No. 13		
2024	Sarkaaru Noukari		
2024	Drill		
2024	Nindha	Satyanand	
2024	Honeymoon Express	Bala	
2024	C202		
2024	Haddhu Ledhu Raa		
2024	Prathinidhi 2		
2024	Vidya Vasula Aham	Spiritual Preacher	
2024	Shivam Bhaje	Raghu Ram	
2024	Bhaje Vaayu Vegam	Goppula Lakshmaiah	
2024	Mr. Bachchan	Ramgarh Thakur	
2024	Keshava Chandra Ramavath		
2024	Manamey	Consulate Officer Mahendra	
2025	Neeli Megha Shyama	Shyam’s father	
2025	Brahma Anandam		
2025	Nenekkaduna		
2025	Shiva Shambho		
2025	Sarangapani Jathakam	Ahobila Rao	
2025	Meghalu Cheppina Prema Katha	Hari’s uncle	
2025	Hari Hara Veera Mallu	Shiva	
2025	Kishkindhapuri	Bhushana Varma	
2026	Raakaasa	Chari	
2026	The Paradise	Metta	

=== Tamil films ===
Year	Title	Role
1994	Veetla Visheshanga	Inspector Sennimalai
2004	Gambeeram	Rajendran
2004	Ghilli	Rajapandi
2005	Mazhai	Deva's father
2007	Azhagiya Tamil Magan	Kathiravan
2008	Bheemaa	Sivaraman
2008	Satyam	Deiva's father
2008	Kuselan	School teacher
2009	Naalai Namadhe	Ramasamy
2010	Drohi	Nanaji
2011	Nootrenbadhu	Narayanan
2012	Dhoni	Karthick's school principal
2014	Kalavaram	Adi Moolam
2015	Baahubali: The Beginning	Swamiji
2015	Moone Moonu Varthai	Dayanidhi
2016	Thozha	Kaalidasan
2023	Vaathi	Thanigachalam
2025	Thug Life	Sivaguru

=== Hindi films ===
Year	Title	Role
1990	Shiva	Nanaji
2001	Love Ke Liye Kuch Bhi Karega	Dakshina Murthy
2010	Rakht Charitra	Padalaneni Ramamurthy
2010	Rakht Charitra 2	Padalaneni Ramamurthy
2019	Saaho	Ramaswamy
2023	Kisi Ka Bhai Kisi Ki Jaan	Kodati Rameshwar

=== Kannada films ===
Year	Title	Role	Notes
2020	Naga Devathe		
2024	Karataka Damanaka	Ramanna	

=== Television ===
Year	Title	Role	Network	Ref(s)
2023–present	Dhootha	Raghavayya	Amazon Prime Video	

== As writer ==
Year	Title	Role
1985	Kanchu Kavacham	Also actor
1985	Aalapana	
1985	Pralayam	
1986	Patnam Pilla Palleturi Chinnodu	
1986	Konaseema Kurradu	
1986	Ladies Tailor	Also actor
1987	Sankeertana	
1987	Sri Kanaka Mahalakshmi Recording Dance Troupe	Also actor
1987	Lawyer Suhasini	Also actor
1987	Maharshi	
1987	Saradhamba	Also actor
1988	Varasudochadu	Also actor
1988	Siripuram Chinnodu	Also actor
1988	Bharya Bhartala Bagotham	
1989	Siva	Also actor
1989	Chinnari Sneham	
1989	Swara Kalpana	Also actor
1989	Vinta Dongalu	
1989	Police Report	Also actor
1989	Chettu Kinda Pleader	Also actor
1990	Chevilo Puvvu	Also actor
1990	Nari Nari Naduma Murari	Also actor
1991	Maha Yagnam	Also actor
1991	Jaitra Yatra	Also actor
1992	Mondi Mogudu Penki Pellam	Also actor
1992	Chakra Vyuham	
1992	Attasommu Alludu Daanam	
1992	Balarama Krishnulu	Also actor
1993	Aadarsham	Also actor
1993	Pekata Paparao	Also actor
1993	One By Two	Also actor
1993	Urmila	
1993	Ankuram	
1993	Jeevithame Oka Cinema	Also actor
1993	Dhadi	Also actor
1993	Rendilla Poojari	Also actor
1994	Namaste Anna	Also actor
1994	Lucky Chance	Also actor
1995	Lingababu Love Story	Also actor
1995	Madya Taragati Mahabharatam	Also actor
1995	Bhale Bullodu	Also actor
1996	Akkum Bukkum	Also actor
1996	Once More	Also actor
1997	Kurralla Rajyam	Also actor
1997	Pattukondi Chuddam	Also actor
1999	Anaganaga Oka Ammai	
2000	Hands Up	Also actor
2004	Preminchukunnam Pelliki Randi	Lyricist

== As voice actor ==
Year	Title	Actor	Role	Notes
1987	Aradhana	Bharathiraja		Voice over in prelude
1996	Bhamane Satyabhamane	Nassar	Pasha	Telugu dubbed version
1999	Kadhalar Dhinam	Manivannan	himself	Telugu dubbed version
2004	Donga Dongadi	Manikka Vinayagam	Vasu's father	Telugu dubbed version
2005	Aparichitudu	Nedumudi Venu	Parthasarathy	Telugu dubbed version
2006	Himsinche Raju 23rd Pulikesi	Ilavarasu	Minister	Telugu dubbed version
2022	Ponniyin Selvan: I	Jayaram	Azhwarkadiyan Nambi	Telugu dubbed version
2023	Ponniyin Selvan: II	Jayaram	Azhwarkadiyan Nambi	Telugu dubbed version
