= List of Telugu films of 2005 =

This is a list of films produced by the Telugu cinema in the Telugu language in the year 2005.

| Rank | Title | Production company | Distributor's share | Ref. |
|---|---|---|---|---|
| 1 | Andarivaadu | Geetha Arts | ₹22 crore gross* ₹10.8 crore share | |
| 2 | Athadu | Sri Jayabheri Art Productions | ₹22 crore | |
| 3 | Chatrapathi | Sri Venkateswara Cine Chitra | ₹21 crore | |
| 4 | Sankranti | Super Good Films | ₹20.3 crore | |
| 5 | Nuvvostanante Nenoddantana | Sumanth Art Productions | ₹18 crore | |
| 6 | Jai Chiranjeeva | Vyjayanthi Movies | ₹17.8 crore | |
| 7 | Bunny | Siri Venkateswara Productions | ₹16 crore | |
| 8 | Bhadra | Sri Venkateswara Creations | ₹15 crore | |
| 9 | Evadi Gola Vaadidhi | Larsco Entertainments | ₹10 crore | |
| 10 | Athanokkade | N.T.R Arts | ₹9 crore | |

== January–June ==
| Opening | | Title | Director | Cast | Production house | Ref |
|---|---|---|---|---|---|---|
| J A N | 1 | Pelli Kaani Pellam Avuthundi | Venkata Ganesh | Venu Madhav, Mumtaj, Radhika Chowdhary | Sri Bharati Enterprises | |
| J A N | 6 | Balu | A. Karunakaran | Pawan Kalyan, Shriya Saran, Neha Oberoi, Gulshan Grover, Milind Gunaji | | |
| J A N | 6 | Bucchi Babu | T. Raju | Krishnudu, Bobby, Abhinayasri | | |
| J A N | 14 | Nuvvostanante Nenoddantana | Prabhu Deva | Siddharth, Trisha Krishnan, Srihari | | |
| J A N | 14 | Naa Alludu | Vara Mullapudi | Jr. NTR, Shriya Saran, Genelia D'Souza | | |
| J A N | 14 | Dhana 51 | R. Soorya Kiran | Sumanth, Saloni Aswani | | |
| J A N | 21 | Evadi Gola Vaadidi | E. V. V. Satyanarayana | Aryan Rajesh, Deepika Chikhalia, Brahmanandam | | |
| F E B | 4 | 786 Khaidi Premakatha | K S Nageswara Rao | Sashikanth, Poonam Bhartke, Yana Sheik, Bramhanandam | | |
| F E B | 4 | Arey | K S Nageswara Rao | Kesava Teerdha, Mounika | | |
| F E B | 4 | Keelu Gurram | Kodi Ramakrishna | Rohit, Baladitya, Nakul, Rajesh, Tanu Roy | | |
| F E B | 5 | Pandem | Sabhapati | Jagapati Babu, Kalyani, Ramaraju, M. S. Narayana | | |
| F E B | 10 | Evaru Nenu | Bhimeshwararao munjuluri | Krishna | | |
| F E B | 11 | Orey Pandu | Tejas Dhanraj | Sachiin Joshi, Sandali Sinha, Bhanupriya | | |
| F E B | 12 | Dhairyam | Teja | Nitin, Raima Sen, Tanikella Bharani | | |
| F E B | 12 | Manasu Maata Vinadhu | V. N. Aditya | Navdeep, Ankitha, Sandeep, Tanikella Bharani | | |
| F E B | 18 | Sankranti | Muppalaneni Siva | Venkatesh, Sneha, Siva Balaji, Sharwanand, Srikanth, Sangeetha | | |
| F E B | 18 | Thanks | Manraj | Vineeth, Rashmi Gautam | | |
| F E B | 25 | Relax | | | | |
| F E B | 26 | Sravanamasam | Posani Krishna Murali | Krishna, Nandamuri Harikrishna, Karthikeya, Nagababu, Suman, Vijaya Nirmala, Gajala, Kalyani, Keerti Chawla | | |
| M A R | 3 | Slokam | Bharath | Sai Kumar, Ambika, Madhu Sharma, K. Vishwanath | | |
| M A R | 4 | Youth | J. Jitendra | Vikram, Sri Harsha, Lahari, Sishwa | Sri Siva Kesava (SSK) Films | |
| M A R | 5 | Okkade Kaani Iddaru | | Sanghavi | | |
| M A R | 5 | Prayatnam | P Sunil Kumar Reddy | Babloo Prithviraj, Sujitha, Tanu Roy | | |
| M A R | 11 | Swami Shankar | Madhusudhan Rao | Dinesh, Sriram, Brahmanandam | | |
| M A R | 25 | Chakram | Krishna Vamsi | Prabhas, Asin Thottumkal, Charmme | | |
| M A R | 31 | Soggadu | Ravi Babu | Tarun, Aarti Agarwal | | |
| A P R | 1 | Andagadu | | Rajendra Prasad | | |
| A P R | 6 | Bunny | V. V. Vinayak | Allu Arjun, Gowri Munjal, Prakash Raj | | |
| A P R | 6 | Avunanna Kaadanna | Teja | Uday Kiran, Sadha | | |
| A P R | 15 | Muddula Mogudu Allari Pellam | Ramachandrudu | Ali | | |
| A P R | 21 | Ayodhya | Kodi Ramakrishna | Krishna, Vadde Naveen, Rathi | | |
| A P R | 22 | Subash Chandra Bose | K. Raghavendra Rao | Venkatesh, Genelia D'Souza, Shriya Saran, Prakash Raj | | |
| A P R | 28 | Hungama | S. V. Krishna Reddy | Venu Madhav | | |
| A P R | 28 | Mr. Errababu | K Kishore | Sivaji, Roma, Nagendra Babu, Sunil, Satyanarayana, Venu Madhav | | |
| A P R | 28 | 10 The Strangers | Rajesh Touchriver | Nagababu, Jyothirmayee, Nassar, Brahmaji, Sherry | | |
| M A Y | 6 | Naa Praanam Kante Ekkuva | Sashi Preetham | Neeraj, Madhu Shalini, Vamsi Varma, Jeevan Sekhar | | |
| M A Y | 7 | Athanokkade | Surender Reddy | Kalyan Ram, Sindhu Tolani, Ashish Vidyarthi, Brahmanandam | | |
| M A Y | 12 | Bhadra | Boyapati Srinu | Ravi Teja, Meera Jasmine, Prakash Raj, Pradeep Rawat | | |
| M A Y | 12 | Kumkuma | Jyothindranath Vemuri | Siva Balaji, Jayant, Seema, Ranganath, Sivaji Raja | | |
| M A Y | 20 | Narasimhudu | B. Gopal | Jr. NTR, Ameesha Patel, Sameera Reddy | | |
| J U N | 4 | Andarivadu | Srinu Vaitla | Chiranjeevi, Tabu, Rimi Sen | | |
| J U N | 10 | Meghamala O Pellam Gola | Sanjay | Santhosh Pawan, Tanu Roy | | |
| J U N | 10 | Kadante Avunanile | O S Avinash | Vamsi Krishna, Naveena, Suman, Chandra Mohan, Giribabu, Brahmanandam | | |
| J U N | 24 | Jagapathi | Jonnalagadda Srinivasa Rao | Jagapati Babu, Rakshita, Sai Kiran, Navneet Kaur, Pradeep Rawat | | |
| J U N | 24 | Anna Sainyam | | Lakshmi Parvathi, Vinod Kumar, Koteswara Prasad, Gokina Rama Rao | | |
| J U N | 24 | Devi Abhayam | Srinivasa Reddy | Sai Kiran, Raasi, Prema, Prabhakar | | |
| J U N | 30 | Anukokunda Oka Roju | Chandra Sekhar Yeleti | Jagapathi Babu, Charmme, Shashank | | |
| J U N | 30 | Guru | B Jaffer | Akash, Pranathi | | |

== July–December ==
| Opening | | Title | Director | Cast | Production house | Ref |
|---|---|---|---|---|---|---|
| J U L | 1 | Oka Oorilo | Ramesh Verma | Raja, Tarun, Saloni Aswani | | |
| J U L | 1 | Naa Oopiri | Kanmani | Vadde Naveen, Sangeetha, Anjana, Sudha, M. S. Narayana | | |
| J U L | 1 | Nireekshana | N. Seetharam | Aryan Rajesh, Sridevi Vijayakumar, Nagendra Prasad | | |
| J U L | 9 | A Film by Aravind | Shekkar Suri | Rajiv Kanakala, Ghazal Srinivas, Richard Rishi, Sherlyn Chopra | | |
| J U L | 15 | Kanchanamala Cable TV | Parthasaradhi | Srikanth, Lakshmi Rai, Raghu Babu, Brahmanandam | | |
| J U L | 21 | Super | Puri Jagannadh | Nagarjuna, Sonu Sood, Anushka Shetty, Ayesha Takia | | |
| J U L | 21 | Siva | | Pradeep, Saina | | |
| J U L | 29 | Rendella Tharuvatha | K B Anand | Sreeram, Gopichand Lagadapati | | |
| A U G | 4 | Premikulu | Jaya | Yuvaraj, Rishi Girish, Kamna Jethmalani, Rajiv Kanakala, Rambabu | | |
| A U G | 5 | Nikkis Engagement | Rafi | Surya, Vamsi, Rekha | | |
| A U G | 10 | Athadu | Trivikram Srinivas | Mahesh Babu, Trisha, Sonu Sood, Prakash Raj, Sayaji Shinde | | |
| A U G | 12 | Nuvvante Naakishtam | E. V. V. Satyanarayana | Aryan Rajesh, Allari Naresh, Anuradha Mehta | | |
| A U G | 19 | Andhrudu | Paruchuri Murali | Gopichand, Gowri Pandit, Sayaji Shinde | | |
| A U G | 19 | Please Naaku Pellaindi | Gandhi | Raghu, Rajiv Kanakala, Sruthi Malhotra, Soni Charishma, Venu Madhav | | |
| A U G | 20 | Adirindayya Chandram | Srinivasa Reddy | Sivaji, Laya | | |
| A U G | 25 | 123 from Amalapuram | Varma | Ravi Prakash, Raja Sridhar, Anil, Nithya Das, Dharmavarapu Subramanyam | | |
| S E P | 1 | Okkade | Chandra Mahesh | Srihari, Santhoshi, Mukesh Rishi | | |
| S E P | 7 | Mogudu Pellam O Dongodu | Venky | Shriya Saran, Raja, Brahmanandam | | |
| S E P | 7 | Atanu + Ame = 9 | | | | |
| S E P | 9 | Veeri Veeri Gummadi Pandu | Nimmagadda Babu | Ali, Sreekar Babu, Jayalalitha, Rajiv Kanakala | | |
| S E P | 15 | Allari Bullodu | K. Raghavendra Rao | Nitin, Trisha, Rathi | | |
| S E P | 15 | Nayakudu | Kodi Ramakrishna | Rajasekhar, Namitha | | |
| S E P | 22 | Good Boy | G. Nageswara Reddy | Rohit, Navneet Kaur | | |
| S E P | 29 | Political Rowdy | Adi | Mohan Babu, Charmy Kaur, Prakash Raj, Abbas | | |
| S E P | 30 | Chatrapathi | S. S. Rajamouli | Prabhas, Shriya Saran, Bhanupriya | | |
| O C T | 5 | Allari Pidugu | Jayanth C. Paranjee | Nandamuri Balakrishna, Charmy Kaur, Katrina Kaif | | |
| O C T | 13 | Bhageeratha | Rasool Ellore | Ravi Teja, Shriya Saran, Prakash Raj | | |
| O C T | 21 | Modati Cinema | Venkat Kuchipudi | Navdeep, Poonam Bajwa, Brahmanandam | | |
| O C T | 21 | Vamsham | | Nagababu, Chandramohan, Baladitya | | |
| O C T | 28 | Bhama Kalapam | K.V.V. Satyanarayana | Aditya Om, Meghna Naidu, Pooja Bharati | | |
| O C T | 29 | Moguds Pellams | Ranganath | Sivaji Raja, Karthik, Rathi, Harika, Chandra Mohan, M. S. Narayana | | |
| N O V | 11 | Abhimaani | Sana Yadi Reddy | Nakuul Mehta, Swetha Malhotra | | |
| N O V | 18 | Meenakshi | T. Prabhakar | Kamalinee Mukherjee, Rajiv Kanakala, Amit Tiwari, Preethi Nigam | | |
| N O V | 18 | Ayinda Leda | Bharath | Ali, Raksha, Kota Srinivasa Rao, Mallikarjuna Rao, Brahmanandam | | |
| N O V | 23 | Seenugadu Chiranjeevi Fan | Posala Radhakrishna | Akula Vijay Vardhan, Venu Madhav, M. S. Narayana | | |
| N O V | 26 | Vennela | Deva Kaushik | Raja, Parvati Melton | | |
| D E C | 2 | Sri | Dasaradh | Manoj Manchu, Tamanna | | |
| D E C | 2 | Mukha Chitram | S Babu | Srirambaji, Haripriya | | |
| D E C | 3 | Mahanandi | V. Samudra | Sumanth, Srihari, Anushka Shetty | | |
| D E C | 9 | Kaaki | Bobbili Bhanu | Brahmaji, Gurleen Chopra | | |
| D E C | 10 | Yuvakulu | Sai Venkat | Kiran Tej, Sangeetha Tiwari, Abhinayasri | | |
| D E C | 10 | Pourusham | | | | |
| D E C | 16 | Venkat Tho Alivelu | P Balaji | Dilip, Sanjana, M. S. Narayana, Omkar, Anil | | |
| D E C | 21 | Jai Chiranjeeva | K. Vijaya Bhaskar | Chiranjeevi, Sameera Reddy, Bhoomika Chawla, Arbaaz Khan | | |
| D E C | 24 | Alex | Rajesh Touchriver | Haranath, Rambha, Sangeetha, Shiju, Kousha, Indu Anand | | |
| D E C | 30 | Gowtam SSC | P A Arun Prasad | Navdeep, Sindhu Tolani, K. Vishwanath, Bhanupriya | | |
| D E C | 30 | Maha Simham | Akkumurthy Babu Rao | Mukkuraju, Rallapalli, Kallu Chidambaram, Swathi, Susheela | | |

== See also ==
- List of Telugu films of 2004
- Lists of Telugu-language films
- List of Telugu films of 2006
