= List of Telugu films of 2004 =

This is a list of Telugu-language films produced in Telugu Cinema in India that are released in 2004.

== January–June ==
Opening		Title	Director	Cast	Production house	Ref
J A N	1	Andhrawala	Puri Jagannadh	Jr. NTR, Rakshita, Shayaji Shinde, Rahul Dev, Sanghavi	Produced by Sri Bharati Enterprises	
J A N	14	Lakshmi Narasimha	Jayanth C. Paranjee	Nandamuri Balakrishna, Asin Thottumkal, Prakash Raj, K. Vishwanath, Sunil, Brahmanandam	Produced by Sri Ganesh Productions	
J A N	14	Varsham	Sobhan	Prabhas, Trisha Krishnan, Gopichand, Prakash Raj, Sudha Chandran	Produced by Sumanth Arts	
J A N	15	Anji	Kodi Ramakrishna	Chiranjeevi, Namrata Shirodkar, Tinnu Anand, M. S. Narayana	Produced by MS Arts	
J A N	23	Athade Oka Sainyam	S. V. Krishna Reddy	Jagapati Babu, Neha, Suman, Prakash Raj	Produced by SVK Films	
J A N	30	Vegu Chukkalu	R. Narayana Murthy	R Narayana Murthy, Murali Mohan, Prabha, LB Sriram	Produced by Sneha Chitra	
J A N	30	Ika Antha Subhame Pelli Jaripinchandi	Thota Krishna	Sai Kiran, Priya Sahadevan, Vijayabhaskar, Priyanka Naidu	Produced by Kotipally Productions	
F E B	5	Love Today	Arputham	Uday Kiran, Divya Khosla, Tanikella Bharani, Sunil	Produced by Super Good films	
F E B	6	Anandamanandamaye	Srinu Vaitla	Jai Akash, Renuka Menon, J. D. Chakravarthy, Preeti Jhangiani, Sunil	Produced by Ushakiran Movies	
F E B	6	Aaruguru Pativratalu	E. V. V. Satyanarayana	Vidya, Harika, Neetha, Amrutha, Lahari, Shanti Rao, Chalapathi Rao		
F E B	13	Tapana	Tejas Dhanraj	Prabhu Deva, Siddardha, Maahi, Seema, Archana	Produced by Applause Entertainment	
F E B	13	Dharma	K N Nageshwara Rao	Sreeman, Keerthi Chawla, Siva Reddy		
F E B	13	Sunday	Achyuta Reddy	Sanjay, Mamatha, Suhasini		
F E B	18	Malliswari	Vijaya Bhaskar	Venkatesh, Katrina Kaif, Kota Srinivasa Rao, Brahmanandam	Produced by Suresh Productions	
F E B	18	Swetha Naagu	Sanjeevi	Soundarya, Abbas, Sarath Babu, Dharmavarapu Subramanyam, Brahmanandam		
F E B	18	CBI Officer	D Ranga Rao	Krishna, Naresh		
F E B	27	Mee Intikoste Yemistaru Ma Intikoste Yem Testaru	Raja Vannemreddy	Aditya Om, Sangeetha, Sunil, Brahmanandam, Kovai Sarala, Radhika Chowdhary		
F E B	27	Abbayi Premalo Paddadu	Kota Babu	Ramana, Anita Patel, Siva Krishna		
M A R	5	Sorry Naaku Pellaindi	Gandhi	Raghu, Ruthika, Raghu Babu, Lahari		
M A R	5	Guri	Bharat	Srihari, Vadde Naveen, Sanghavi		
M A R	5	Enjoy	T. N. Raju	Ajay, Chitra, Badrinath, Jaya Prakash Reddy		
M A R	13	Satta	Lakshman	Sai Kiran, Madurima, Kota Sreenivas Rao, Banerji		
M A R	25	Jai	Teja	Navdeep, Santhoshi, Ayesha Jhulka	Produced by Chitram Movies	
M A R	26	Venky	Srinu Vaitla	Ravi Teja, Sneha, Ashutosh Rana, Brahmanandam	Produced by Lakshmi Productions	
M A R	26	Seenu Vasanthi Lakshmi	N. M. Suresh	R. P. Patnaik, Priya, Navneet Kaur, Prakash Raj, Giri Babu	Produced by Sri Thulaja Bhavani Creations	
A P R	1	Avunu Nijame	Rafi	Rafi, Tanu Roy, Brahmanandam	Vaishnavi Silver Creations	
A P R	1	Premante Maade	L. Venu	Vinay Babu, Reena, Rashmi, Amar, Vizag Prasad, Mallikharjuna Rao	Sri God Gift Films	
A P R	2	Kaasi	Lakshmi Srinivas	J. D. Chakravarthy, Keerthi Chawla		
A P R	2	Sankharavam	A. Mohana Gandhi	Sarath Babu, Srinath, Rajiv Kanakala, Raja, Krishna Bhagavaan		
A P R	2	Yours Abhi	Kiran	Kamalakar, Sonali Joshi, Teja Sri, Suresh, Satya Prakash	Sri Surya Kamal Movies	
A P R	7	Nenunnanu	V. N. Aditya	Nagarjuna, Shriya Saran, Aarti Agarwal, Ali		
A P R	14	Puttintiki Ra Chelli	Kodi Ramakrishna	Arjun, Meena, Swati, Srinath, Sivaji Raja	Megahit Films	
A P R	14	Nenu	E. Sathibabu	Allari Naresh, Veda Shastry, Abhishek		
A P R	16	Kushi Kushiga	G. Ram Prasad	Jagapati Babu, Venu Thottempudi, Sangeetha, Nikita Thukral, Ramya Krishna	Aditya Ram Movies	
A P R	22	Preminchukunnam Pelliki Randi	Relangi Narasimha Rao	Aditya Om, Rekha Vedavyas, Vijay Sai, Revathi, Jeeva	Produced by Nithya Movies	
A P R	22	Vignesh	Marella Seenu	Bhagawan, Seema, Jahnavi, Brahmaji, Jayaprakash Reddy		
A P R	23	Seshadri Naidu	Suresh Varma	Srihari, Nanditha Jennifer, Swathi, Jayaram	Chalanachitra Films	
A P R	30	Pedababu	Paruchuri Murali	Jagapati Babu, Kalyani, Sarath Babu, K. Vishwanath, Kota Srinivasa Rao		
A P R	30	Dost	Muppalaneni Siva	Siva Balaji, Karthik, Neha, Suhasini, K. Vishwanath, Brahmanandam		
M A Y	7	Arya	Sukumar	Allu Arjun, Anuradha Mehta, Siva Balaji	Produced by Sri Venkateshwara Creations	
M A Y	14	Naani	S. J. Suryah	Mahesh Babu, Amisha Patel, Devayani, Raghuvaran		
M A Y	21	Adavi Ramudu	B. Gopal	Prabhas, Aarti Agarwal, Nassar, Seema		
M A Y	28	Oka Pellam Muddu Rendo Pellam Vaddu	Teja	Rajendra Prasad, Raasi, Gurleen Chopra, Surya, Rama Prabha	Sai Krishna Productions	
M A Y	28	Aithe Enti	Soma Vijay Prakash	Namitha, Steven Kapoor, Mohit, Radhika Chowdary	Vijay Suresh Productions	
J U N	4	Kala	C. Manohar	Raja, Nayana Harshita, Ramachandra Reddy	Produced by Sri Venkateswara Chitra	
J U N	4	Megham	Sunil Kumar Reddy	Raghu, Tanu Roy		
J U N	9	Samba	V. V. Vinayak	Jr. NTR, Genelia D'Souza, Bhoomika Chawla, Prakash Raj		
J U N	18	Andaru Dongale Dorikite	Nidhi Prasad	Rajendra Prasad, Prabhu Deva, Ankitha, Kiran Rathod		
J U N	18	Nenu Saitham	Dhavala Satyam	Madala Ravi, Madala Ranga Rao, Gurleen Chopra, Chandra Mohan		
J U N	25	Bhadradri Ramudu	Suresh Krissna	Taraka Rathna, Vanisri, Chalapathi Rao, Sudhakar, Radhika		
J U N	25	5va Tarikhu	Suresh Charan	Sharwanand, Revathy		
J U N	25	Mystery	D. Ranga Rao	Suman, Jyotsna		
J U N	25	Xtra	Veeru K.	Santhosh Pawan, Ruthika, Naveen, Pooja, Jayalalitha		
J U N	25	Koduku	M. S. Narayana	Vikram, Aditi Agarwal, Mounika, Suman, Ponnambalam		

== July–December ==
Opening		Title	Director	Cast	Production house	Ref
J U L	2	Yagnam	A. S. Ravikumar Chowdhary	Gopichand, Sameera Bannerjee, Prakash Raj		
J U L	9	Santhi Sandesam	P. C. Reddy	Krishna, Ramyasri, Suman, Vinod Kumar, Ravali		
J U L	9	KD No.1	Raviraja Pinisetty	Srihari, Ramya Krishna		
J U L	16	Swamy	V. R. Pratap	Nandamuri Harikrishna, Meena, Aamani, Uma, Rajiv Kanakala		
J U L	16	Ammayi Bagundi	Bala Sekharan	Sivaji, Meera Jasmine		
J U L	16	Sivaram	Rajkumar	Sai Kumar, Devayani, Devan, Rami Reddy, Jeeva		
J U L	23	Sri Anjaneyam	Krishna Vamsi	Arjun, Nithiin, Charmme		
J U L	30	Gharshana	Gautham Vasudev Menon	Venkatesh, Asin, Daniel Balaji		
J U L	30	Pallakilo Pellikoothuru	Suchitra Chandrabose	Gowtham, Rathi, Brahmanandam		
A U G	6	Donga Dongadi	Subramanyam Siva	Manoj Manchu, Sadha, Varshitha, Sunil, Siva Reddy		
A U G	11	Naa Autograph	S. Gopal Reddy	Ravi Teja, Bhoomika Chawla, Gopika, Mallika		
A U G	13	Intlo Srimathi Veedhilo Kumari	K. Vasu	Aarti Chabria, Srikanth, Prabhudeva, Prakash Raj, Brahmanandam		
A U G	13	Valliddaru Okkate	J. Srinivasa Rao	T. Kishore, Renuka Menon		
A U G	18	Arjun	Gunasekhar	Mahesh Babu, Keerthi Reddy, Shriya Saran, Prakash Raj		
A U G	25	Shivashankar	Kapuganti Rajendra	Mohan Babu, Soundarya, Natanya Singh, Raza Murad, Riyaz Khan		
A U G	27	143 (and I miss You)	Puri Jagannadh	Sairam Shankar, Samiksha, Flora		
S E P	3	Madhyanam Hathya	Ram Gopal Verma	J. D. Chakravarthy, Aamani, Priyanka, Venkat, Bhanuchander, Brahmaji		
S E P	3	Gowri	B. V. Ramana	Sumanth, Charmme, Atul Kulkarni		
S E P	10	Gudumba Shankar	Veera Shankar	Pawan Kalyan, Meera Jasmine		
S E P	18	Soggadi Saradalu	Nimmagadda Babu	Santosh Pavan, Haritha, Satyam Rajesh, Chitram Basha, Brahmanandam		
S E P	23	Sye	S. S. Rajamouli	Nithiin, Genelia D'Souza, Pradeep Rawat		
S E P	23	Cheppave Chirugali	Vikraman	Venu Thottempudi, Ashima Bhalla, Abhirami, Kiran Rathod		
O C T	1	Letha Manasulu	S. V. Krishna Reddy	Srikanth, Kalyani, Gopika, Raghunatha Reddy		
O C T	8	Satruvu	P. A. Arun Prasad	Vadde Naveen, Navneet Kaur		
O C T	15	Anand	Sekhar Kammula	Raja, Kamalinee Mukherjee		
O C T	15	Shankar Dada M.B.B.S.	Jayanth C. Paranjee	Chiranjeevi, Srikanth, Sonali Bendre, Paresh Rawal		
O C T	22	Mr & Mrs Sailaja Krishnamurthy	Siva Nageswara Rao	Sivaji, Laila, Tanikella Bharani, Banerjee		
O C T	23	Aaptudu	Muthyala Subbaiah	Rajasekhar, Anjala Zhaveri, Mukesh Rishi		
N O V	4	Apparao Driving School	Anji Seenu	Rajendra Prasad, Malavika, Preeti Jhangiani, Suman, Brahmanandam		
N O V	5	Swarabhishekam	K. Viswanath	K. Vishwanath, Srikanth, Laya, Urvashi		
N O V	6	7G Brindhavan Colony	Sri Raghava	Ravi Krishna, Sonia Agarwal, Suman Setty, Chandra Mohan		Sri Surya Movies
N O V	12	Chanti	Sobhan	Ravi Teja, Charmme		
N O V	12	Yuvasena	Jayaraj	Bharath, Gopika, Sharwanand		
N O V	19	Naalo	Samuthirakani	SPB Charan, Babloo Prithviraj, Pooja Bharathi		
N O V	26	Kaani	Abhinav Velagaleti	Sai Kiran, Meera, Jyoti		
D E C	2	Suryam	V. Samudra	Vishnu Manchu, Celina Jaitley		
D E C	2	Sakhiya	Jayanth C. Paranjee	Tarun, Nauheed Cyrusi		
D E C	3	No	Pappu	Nandamuri Taraka Ratna, Chaya Singh, Neha, Keerti Chawla, Tanu Roy, Ashish Vidyarthi		Chilukuri Balaji Productions
D E C	4	Konchem Touchlo Vunte Cheputanu	Vamsy	Sivaji, Veda Shastry, Prakash Raj, M. S. Narayana, Brahmanandam		
D E C	4	Leela Mahal Center	Devi Prasad	Aryan Rajesh, Sadha		
D E C	9	Vidyardhi	Balachari	Ramesh, Aditi Agarwal		
D E C	9	Aa Naluguru	Chandra Sidhartha	Rajendra Prasad, Amani		
D E C	9	Gangamma Jatara	R. Narayana Murthy	R. Narayana Murthy, Neelima Rao		
D E C	15	Vijayendra Varma	Swarna Subba Rao	Nandamuri Balakrishna, Laya, Ankitha		
D E C	23	Mass	Raghava Lawrence	Nagarjuna, Jyothika, Charmme		

== See also ==
- List of Telugu films of 2003
- Lists of Telugu-language films
- List of Telugu films of 2005
