= E. V. V. Cinema =

Tollywood film production company

- Company type: Film production company
- Industry: Entertainment
- Founded: E. V. V. Satyanarayana
- Headquarters: Film Nagar, Hyderabad, Telangana, India
- Key people: Aryan Rajesh; Allari Naresh
- Products: Films
- Owners: Aryan Rajesh; Allari Naresh

E. V. V. Cinema is an Indian film production house founded by E. V. V. Satyanarayana.

== Filmography ==
Year	Film	Cast	Director	Notes
2000	Chala Bagundi	Srikanth, Vadde Naveen, Malavika, Asha Saini	E. V. V. Satyanarayana	
2001	Maa Aavida Meeda Ottu Mee Aavida Chala Manchidi	Srikanth, Vadde Naveen, Raasi, Laya	E. V. V. Satyanarayana	
2002	Thotti Gang	Allari Naresh, Prabhu Deva, Anita Hassanandani, Sunil, Gajala	E. V. V. Satyanarayana	
2004	Aaruguru Pativratalu	Krishna Koushik, Anand, Ravi Varma, Ajay Raj, Ajay, Varun, Shanti Rao, Lahari, Neetha, Vidya Vathi, Haarika, Amrutha Anandamayi	E. V. V. Satyanarayana	
2005	Nuvvante Naakishtam	Aryan Rajesh, Allari Naresh, Anuradha Mehta	E. V. V. Satyanarayana	
2006	Kithakithalu	Allari Naresh, Geetha Singh	E. V. V. Satyanarayana	
2007	Athili Sattibabu LKG	Allari Naresh, Kausha Rach, Sheetal, Vidisha	E. V. V. Satyanarayana	
2009	Fitting Master	Allari Naresh, Madalsa Sharma	E. V. V. Satyanarayana	
2010	Kathi Kantha Rao	Allari Naresh, Kamna Jethmalani	E. V. V. Satyanarayana	
2015	Bandipotu	Allari Naresh, Eesha, Srinivas Avasarala, Sampoornesh Babu	Mohan Krishna Indraganti	
