= Edara =

Edara or Eedara (Telugu: ఈదర) is a Telugu surname. Notable people with the surname include:

- Edara Aryan Rajesh, Indian actor known professionally as Aryan Rajesh
- Edara Naresh (born 1982), Indian actor known professionally as Allari Naresh
- Eedara Veera Venkata Satyanarayana (1956–2011), Indian film music director, screenwriter, and producer
