= Aadanthe Ado Type =

- DVD Cover
- Directed by: E. V. V. Satyanarayana
- Screenplay by: E. V. V. Satyanarayana; Janardhana Maharshi
- Story by: Ameer Sultan
- Based on: Mounam Pesiyadhe (Tamil)
- Produced by: Ambica Krishna
- Starring: Aryan Rajesh; Sivaji; Anita Hassanandani; Sindhu Menon
- Cinematography: V. Srinivasa Reddy
- Edited by: V. Nagi Reddy
- Music by: Yuvan Shankar Raja
- Production company: Ambica Art Productions
- Release date: 30 August 2003
- Country: India
- Language: Telugu

Aadanthe Ado Type is a 2003 Indian Telugu-language romance film directed by E V V Satyanarayana, starring Aryan Rajesh, Sivaji and Anita Hassanandani. It is a remake of the 2002 Tamil film Mounam Pesiyadhe by Ameer Sultan, with Aryan Rajesh, Anita, Shivaji, and Sindhu replacing Suriya, Trisha, Nandha, and Neha Pendse, respectively, who originally played the roles. The film was released on 30 August 2003. A dubbed Telugu version of Mounam Pesiyadhe, titled Kanchu, which was released in 2006.

== Plot ==
Surya (Aryan Rajesh) is a man who hates love. But somehow he is charmed by Brunda (Anita Hassanandani). Brunda likes his attitude and admires him as a friend. But her admiration coupled with a few coincidences makes Surya think that she is in love him. When he is expecting her to speak those magical words (I love you), she introduces Surya to her fiancé (Sai Kiran). After Brunda marries her beau, a damsel (Bhoomika Chawla) meets Surya and explains the flashback. That beautiful girl is a silent admirer of Surya and had been following him for years. She proposes to Surya when they were in college. Surya asks her to come back once he is financially settled, as love and life after all need security. Finally Surya settles down with her and the movie ends on a happy note.

== Cast ==
- Aryan Rajesh as Surya
- Sivaji as Krishna Bhagavan
- Anita Hassanandani as Brinda
- Sindhu Menon
- Sai Kiran as Brinda's fiancé
- Ambica Krishna
- Brahmanandam
- Ali as Surya and Krishna's friend
- Giri Babu
- Chandra Mohan as Krishna's father
- Chalapathi Rao as Brunda's father
- Krishna Bhagavan
- Mallikarjuna Rao as Lecturer
- Narra Venkateswara Rao
- MS Narayana
- Ahuti Prasad
- L.B. Sriram
- Benarjee
- Bandla Ganesh
- Sana
- Lakshmipati as Auto driver
- Padma Jayanti
- Bhumika Chawla in a cameo appearance

== Soundtrack ==
Aadanthe Ado Type

Soundtrack album by Yuvan Shankar Raja
- Released: 3 June 2003
- Recorded: 2003
- Genre: Feature film soundtrack
- Length: 37:13
- Producer: Yuvan Shankar Raja

Yuvan Shankar Raja chronology
Kaadhal Kondein (2003)	Aadanthe Ado Type (2003)	Pudhiya Geethai (2003)

The music, including film score, was composed by Ilaiyaraaja's youngest son, Yuvan Shankar Raja. The soundtrack comprises 7 tracks, composed by Yuvan Shankar Raja as well, out of which 4 songs were retained from the original film and 1 song was retained from Manadhai Thirudivittai with minor modifications. The lyrics were written by Surendra Krishna. The audio was launched live through Gemini TV, whereas viewers themselves could release one of the songs, by calling on a certain number. Out of 2.7 lakhs callers 7 people got the chance to release a song each.

Track	Song	Singer(s)	Duration	Notes
1	"Chinnadani Soku"	Tippu, Sujatha	5:31	based on "Manja Kaattu Maina" from Manadhai Thirudivittai
2	"Pogarekki Pandemeste"	S. P. Balasubrahmanyam	4:33	based on "Aadatha Aatamellam" from Mounam Pesiyadhe
3	"O Prema O Prema"	Shankar Mahadevan	4:47	based on "En Anbae En Anbae" from Mounam Pesiyadhe
4	"O Friend Nee Kopam"	Karthik Raja, Tippu	4:16	based on "Eh Nanbane Kopam" from Mounam Pesiyadhe
5	"Kopamga Choostu"	Rajesh, Ravi Varma, Gangadhar, Sandeep, Usha	9:00	
6	"Andame Aanandam"	Karthik, Gopika Poornima	3:53	
7	"Chinna Navvutho"	Hariharan	5:17	based on "Chinna Chinnathai" from Mounam Pesiyadhe

== Reception ==
Jeevi of Idlebrain.com rated the film 2.5/5 and wrote, "Though the narration sounded neat, the emotions of the film were not brought out. EVV should stop handling subjects which he is not familiar with and start adapting the his[sic] good old narration style, which has given his blockbusters in the past".
