= Khayyum =

Indian actor

- Born: Rajahmundry, Andhra Pradesh, India
- Occupation: Actor
- Years active: 1991–present
- Spouse: Arshia Kamal
- Relatives: Ali (brother)

Khayyum is an Indian actor who has appeared in more than 100 Telugu films.

== Personal life ==
Khayyum was born in Rajahmundry, Andhra Pradesh, and brought up in Hyderabad. His father was a tailor and his mother was a housewife. He is the younger brother of actor Ali.

In 2015, he married Arshia Kamal, daughter of Guntur-based businessman Shaikh Nayab Kamal.

== Filmography ==
Year	Title	Role	Notes
1993	Evandi Aavida Vachindi		
1994	Alludu Poru Ammayi Joru		
1994	Prema & Co	Pradeep Shakti's Son	Child Artist
1996	Akkum Bakkum		
1999	Rajakumarudu	Raja's collegemate	
1999	Prema Katha	Suri's friend	
2001	Ishtam	Raghu	
2001	Jabili		
2002	Cash		
2002	Hai	Aryan's friend	
2002	Yuva Rathna		
2002	Manasutho	Kanishk's friend	
2004	Enjoy	Ajay	Lead role; credited as Ajay
2005	Super	Akhil's friend	
2005	Sri	Sriram's friend	
2008	Bujjigadu	Sivanna's henchman	
2008	Siddu from Sikakulam	Siddhu's friend	
2008	Blade Babji	Vara Prasad "VP"	
2009	Bumper Offer		
2009	Naa Style Veru	Poonam	
2009	Fitting Master		
2010	Aakasa Ramanna		
2011	Madatha Kaja	Kalyan's friend	
2012	Disco		
2012	Kulumanali		
2013	Kevvu Keka		
2013	Iddarammayilatho	Sanju's music group member	
2014	Jump Jilani		
2014	Ee Varsham Sakshiga		
2015	Mama Manchu Alludu Kanchu		
2015	James Bond		
2015	Bandipotu		
2018	Raju Gadu		
2018	Desamlo Dongalu Paddaru		
2018	Oo Pe Ku Ha		
2018	Idi Naa Love Story		
2019	Danger Love Story		
2021	Romantic		
2021	A1 Express	Khayyum	
2022	Itlu Maredumilli Prajaneekam		
2022	Bhala Chara Bhala		
2022	Niku Naku Pellanta Tom Tom Tom		
2023	CSI Sanatan	Muhammad Salim Baig	
2023	Katha Venuka Katha		

Television

- The Mystery of Moksha Island
