= Geetha Singh =

Indian actress and comedian

- Occupation: Actress
- Years active: 2004-present
- Notable work: Kithakithalu (2006)

Geetha Singh is an Indian actress and comedian. Singh is from North India. She learned Telugu after settling in Telangana. She made her Telugu cinema debut with the 2004 film Jai. Two years later, she starred in Kithakithalu directed by E. V. V. Satyanarayana. During her career, Singh has appeared in over 50 films.

== Filmography ==
- Jai (2004)
- Evadi Gola Vaadidi (2005)
- Allari Pidugu (2005)
- Kithakithalu (2006)
- Premabhishekam (2008)
- Dongala Bandi (2008)
- Sasirekha Parinayam (2009)
- Malli Malli (2009)
- Mondi Mogullu Penki Pellalu (2009)
- Target (2009)
- Mogudu Kavali (2009)
- Neramu Siksha (2009)
- Ooha Chitram (2009)
- Rambabu Gadi Pellam (2010)
- Buridi (2010)
- Aakasa Ramanna (2010)
- Ramdev (2010)
- Poison (2011)
- Babloo (2011)
- Naaku O Loverundhi (2011)
- Pilla Dorikithe Pelli (2011)
- Amayakudu (2011)
- Telugammayi (2011)
- Seema Tapakai (2011)
- Red (2012)
- Dhool (2012)
- Lucky (2012)
- Neelaveni (2013)
- Onbadhule Guru (2013; Tamil)
- Rayalaseema Express (2013)
- Kevvu Keka (2013)
- Potugadu (2013)
- Jump Jilani (2014)
- Shankarabaranam (2015)
- Sarrainodu (2016)
- Kalyana Vaibhogame (2016)
- Eedo Rakam Aado Rakam (2016)
- Tenali Ramakrishna BA. BL (2019)
- Unstoppable (2023)
- Inti No. 13 (2024)
