= Ajay (2006 film) =

2006 film by Meher Ramesh

- VCD cover
- Directed by: Meher Ramesh
- Written by: M. S. Ramesh
- Based on: Okkadu by Gunasekhar
- Produced by: Rockline Venkatesh
- Starring: Puneeth Rajkumar; Anuradha Mehta; Prakash Raj
- Cinematography: Vasu
- Edited by: Marthand K. Venkatesh
- Music by: Mani Sharma
- Production company: Rockline Entertainments Pvt Ltd.
- Distributed by: Rockline Productions
- Release date: 4 May 2006
- Running time: 158 minutes
- Country: India
- Language: Kannada

Ajay is a 2006 Indian Kannada-language action film directed by Meher Ramesh. A remake of the Telugu film Okkadu (2003), the film stars Puneeth Rajkumar, Anuradha Mehta (in her Kannada debut), and Prakash Raj (reprising his role from the original, as well as from the Tamil remake of the original). The music was composed by Mani Sharma with cinematography by Vasu and editing by Marthand K. Venkatesh. The film released on 4 May 2006 and was a commercial success at the Box office.

== Plot ==
Ajay is a Bangalore-based Kabaddi player and the son of DCP Kumaraswamy who visits Hubli to take part in a state-level tournament. In Hubli, Ajay saves Padma from Veerabhadra, a dangerous faction leader who wants to marry her against her wishes. Ajay learns that Padma is trying to leave for the US for pursuing higher education after Veerabhadra killed her brothers, when they refused to marry their sister to Veerabhadra due to a big age gap. In the process of saving Padma, Ajay humiliates Veerabhadra by pushing him into a mud pond.

Veerabhadra refuses to cleanse the mud until Padma is brought back. Ajay helps Padma escape and takes her to his house, hiding her in his room with the help of his sister Asha. However, Ajay's parents find out she is hiding in their house. Padma and Ajay run away again, and the duo, along with Ajay's friends, reaches the airport to help Padma relocate to US. They bring her parents to see her one last time before she leaves.

After Padma passed the airport security, Ajay realizes his love for her. Padma shows up and proposes to him. At the airport, Kumaraswamy arrests Ajay while Veerabhadra's men take Padma away. After Padma taunts Veerabhadra by saying that Ajay will definitely come for her, Veerabhadra goes to prison and asks Ajay to come with him. Veerabhadra and his henchmen are kidnapped by Ajay, who, along with his friends, attends the finals of the national-level Kabaddi tournament.

Meanwhile, Veerabhadra's elder brother Home Minister Doddanna is waiting at the venue of Veerabhadra's marriage with Padma. After learning about his whereabouts, Doddanna reaches the stadium along with Padma and his mother where Ajay and Veerabhadra are fighting with each other. Padma's father brutally stabs Veerabhadra to death, while his mother dies in a bomb blast. Doddanna decides not to react as it would harm his position, and Ajay, whose team won the match, celebrates the victory with Padma and his family.

== Cast ==
- Puneeth Rajkumar as Ajay
- Anuradha Mehta as Padma alias Paddu
- Prakash Raj as Veerabhadra
- Nassar as DCP Kumaraswamy IPS, Ajay's father
- Sumithra as Ajay's mother
- Srinath as Padma's father
- Doddanna as Home Minister Doddanna, Veerabhadra's brother
- Telangana Shakuntala as Shakuntala, Veerabhadra's mother
- Avinash as Paramashiva Murthy, Veerabhadra's father henchman
- Sarigama Viji as Doddanna's PA
- Sathyajith
- R. G. Vijayasarathy
- Tennis Krishna
- Raghu Ram
- Kuri Sunil
- Mahesh Raj
- Venkatesh Prasad
- Swami Nathan
- Jaidev
- K. V. Manjayya
- Vishwas Bharadwaj
- Indhudhar Poojari
- Shailaja Joshi
- Amrutha Yadav
- Jr. Narasimharaju

== Production ==
As of 2005, the film was untitled and shot a few songs in Italy.

== Soundtrack ==
Soundtrack was composed by Mani Sharma. The song "Yene Aagali" was based on "Chitti Nadumune" from Gudumba Shankar. Only the songs "Saagasam" and "Rama Rama" from Okkadu was retained in this version.

Ajay

Soundtrack album by Mani Sharma
- Released: 21 June 2006
- Genre: Feature film soundtrack
External audio
- Official Audio Jukebox on YouTube

No.	Title	Lyrics	Singer(s)	Length
1.	"Rama Anta Krishna Anta"	Hamsalekha	Shankar Mahadevan
2.	"Enayitu Nanageedina"	K. Kalyan	K. S. Chitra, Kunal Ganjawala
3.	"En Chenda"	Hamsalekha	Shreya Ghoshal
4.	"Ene Aagali"	K. Kalyan	Mallikarjun
5.	"Saahasa"	K. Kalyan	S. P. Balasubrahmanyam

== Reception ==
A critic from Sify wrote that the film had the "tried and tested formula which is also entertaining with good production values" and called the film "A treat for Puneeth fans". A critic from Rediff.com wrote that "Aajay is enjoyable fare for large sections of the Kannada film audience who have not seen Okkudu, but it can be a little disappointing for those who have seen its Tamil remake, Ghilli". A critic from Chitraloka.com wrote that "None of the action lovers can miss this film".
