= Maa Aavida Meeda Ottu Mee Aavida Chala Manchidi =

2001 Indian Telugu film

- DVD cover
- Directed by: E. V. V. Satyanarayana
- Written by: E. V. V. Satyanarayana
- Produced by: E. V. V. Satyanarayana
- Dialogue by: Janardhana Maharshi
- Starring: Srikanth; Raasi; Naveen; Laya
- Cinematography: V. Jayaram
- Edited by: K. Ravindra Babu
- Music by: Srinivasa Murthy
- Production company: E. V .V. Cinema
- Release date: 2 February 2001
- Running time: 147 minutes
- Country: India
- Language: Telugu

Maa Aavida Meeda Ottu Mee Aavida Chala Manchidi (transl. I swear on my wife, your wife is a good woman) is a 2001 Indian Telugu-language drama film written, directed and produced by E. V. V. Satyanarayana. The film stars Srikanth, Raasi, Naveen, and Laya. In the film, two estranged lovers—Praveen (Naveen) and Subadra (Raasi)—meet unexpectedly after their respective marriages. Subadra intends to elope and remarry Praveen, leaving her husband Jagdeesh (Srikanth).

The film is loosely inspired by the Hindi film Silsila. The film was released on 2 February 2001.

== Plot ==
Praveen and Subadra love each other against their parents and decide to elope. They plan to meet at the bus station on a night but Praveen does not turn up for unknown reasons while Subadra is caught by her parents who forcibly take her away

Sometime later, Subadra is married to Jagdeesh, and the couple lives in Prem Nagar colony in Hyderabad. Jagdeesh, who works as a manager in a car showroom, always strives to impress Subadra but she acts indifferent towards him. Praveen joins the same company where Jagdeesh works, and they quickly become close acquaintances of each other. Praveen also moves into the same neighbourhood with his wife Kanaka Durga, and their houses are located adjacent to one another.

Soon, Praveen realizes that her former lover Subadra is Jagdeesh's wife. When Subadra is angry with Praveen for not meeting her that night, Praveen reveals that he was unconscious for ten days as he was beaten by his father. Subadra, who still is in love with Praveen, proposes to elope so that they can marry. Reluctant Praveen tries to persuade Subadra that Jagdeesh is a kind-hearted person but Subadra does not budge.

One day, both of them leave for Goa by informing their spouses that they are going on a trip for different reasons. They check into a hotel but Subadra stars feeling guilty about her actions. There, they meet GV and Avanti, ex-classmates of Praveen who are now a couple. They share a similar story but Avanti's husband dies by suicide following her elopement with GV.

Subadra gradually grows fond of her husband Jagdeesh and feels suspicion over Praveen's materialistic motives behind eloping with her. After a few days, Subadra returns to Hyderabad by leaving a note to Praveen that she had changed her mind about remarriage, and prefers to stay with Jagdeesh.

Meanwhile, Kanaka Durga learns that Praveen has eloped with her neighbour's wife. She treats Praveen with disgust following his return from Goa. Subadra resorts to suicide as she couldn't tolerate the deprecatory remarks on her by society. Kanaka Durga, on the other hand, decides to go for an abortion as she doesn't want to bear the child of evil-minded Praveen. Both of them are admitted to Mediciti hospital where GV and Avanti work as doctors while Praveen and Jagdeesh also arrive. There, GV and Avanti reveal they planned Subadra's elopement with Praveen so that she realizes the importance of marriage and loving husband. Subadra and Kanaka Durga realize their mistakes and reunite with their husbands.

== Cast ==
- Srikanth as Jagdeesh
- Raasi as Subadra
- Naveen as Praveen
- Laya as Kanaka Durga
- Prakash Raj as Dr.GV Prakash
- Kamya Panjabi as Avanti
- Kota Srinivasa Rao as Praveen's father
- Chalapathi Rao
- Brahmanandam as Doctor
- Mallikarjuna Rao
- M. S. Narayana
- L. B. Sriram as Laundry Guy
- Narra Venkateswara Rao
- Krishnam Raju
- Jogi Naidu
- Janardhana Maharshi
- Mukku Raju
- Ahuti Prasad
- Nalala Murthy
- Uma Sharma
- Delhi Rajeshwari
- Shoba Rani
- Apoorva

== Production and release ==
Director E. V. V. Satyanarayana initially named the film Pakkintodi Pellam (transl. Neighbour's wife) but anticipating possible repercussions, he later changed the title to Maa Aavida Meeda Ottu Mee Aavida Chala Manchidi. The film began its production in October 2000, aiming for a release in February 2001. Some scenes and songs were shot at Mauritius.

The film was released on 2 February 2001, a week ahead of its planned release date.

== Soundtrack ==
The film has score and soundtrack composed by Srinivasa Murthy, with lyrics written by Sirivennela Seetharama Sastry and Chandrabose.

Track listing
No.	Title	Length
1.	"Ennallako Ila Vennane Koyila"
2.	"Gathame Jathaga Thalachee"
3.	"Ramachilakamma"
4.	"Mundennadu Teliyanidi"

== Reception ==
Griddaluri Gopalrao of Zamin Ryot praised the performances and the direction. In another positive review, Jeevi of Idlebrain.com rated the film 3.75/5 and termed it a "simple story" with a "super screenplay". In a more mixed review, a critic from Sify wrote that "EVV who blindly banks of good story scored again with his taut screenplay but invariably the film lacks the `slickness’ required for such odd themes". Andhra Today wrote "Beginning with the title, the director fills the movie including the story, sequences, and dialogue with double meaning dialogues and makes it an unpleasant viewing. To make the movie a success, one wonders if the director should resort to appeal to baser instincts ? If so, the base humor of M S Narayana, Brahmanandam, Mallikarjuna Rao and L B Sriram is sure to appeal. Srikanth too seems to bag such inane roles which give little importance to the hero. Music score by Srinivasa Murthy too is unimpressive".
