= Bandipotu (2015 film) =

- Directed by: Mohan Krishna Indraganti
- Produced by: Aryan Rajesh
- Starring: Allari Naresh, Eesha Rebba, Srinivas Avasarala
- Cinematography: P.G. Vinda
- Edited by: Dharmendra Kakarala
- Music by: Kalyani Malik
- Production company: E. V .V. Cinema
- Release date: 20 February 2015
- Running time: 126 minutes
- Country: India
- Language: Telugu

Bandipotu (transl. Bandit) is a 2015 Indian Telugu language heist comedy film directed by Mohan Krishna Indraganti and features Allari Naresh and Eesha Rebba in the lead roles while Srinivas Avasarala, Posani Krishna Murali, Tanikella Bharani and Sampoornesh Babu appear in other pivotal roles. The film is produced by Aryan Rajesh on EVV Cinema banner and is titled based on the N. T. Rama Rao's 1963 film of the same name. Kalyani Koduri composed the music while P.G. Vinda and Dharmendra Kakarala handled the cinematography and editing of the movie respectively.

The film was launched on 10 June 2014 at E. V. V. Satyanarayana's residence in Hyderabad. The principal photography started on 1 July 2014 at Rajahmundry. The film was made under the banner of E. V .V. Cinema, and, after delays, released on 20 February 2015. This film got mostly mixed to positive reviews from critics.

== Plot ==
E. Vishwanath (Allari Naresh) is a slick but principled criminal. He believes in "thieving from the thieves", fooling the rich as comeuppance for their greed. One day, a mysterious woman named Jahnavi (Eesha Rebba) comes into his life with evidence of his various frauds. She asks him to pull a massive con to get revenge on three people: Makrand Rao aka "Makrandam" (Tanikella Bharani), Seshagiri (Rao Ramesh), and Bhale Babu (Posani Krishna Murali). All three became rich by embezzling the money of the poor in their chit fund. When their accountant and her father Satyanarayana (Subhalekha Sudhakar) discovered this and threatened to expose these activities, they framed and had him imprisoned for the crime, leading to his depression and a stroke that paralyzed him in the present. However, the trio's greed also led to their split, and they are not on friendly terms. Upon hearing this, Vishwa not only agrees to defraud them but also refuses payment for personal reasons. He enlists the help of his actor friend nicknamed Tellabbai (transl. White/pure guy) (Sampoornesh Babu). Using Jahnavi's experience building cameras, the three start planning.

They first target Makrandam, an antique collector, by convincing him to buy a chest belonging to a rich zamindar. The chest contains a fake letter that purportedly states the location of some of the zamindar's wealth. Overjoyed, Makrandam and his assistant Chikati Rao (lit. '"Darkness" Rao') (Srinivas Avasarala) buy the land from a local farmer and dig for the treasure that night. They find a chest but see that it contains shredded paper and a tape recorder declaring that they have been fooled. Vishwa and Tellabbai take their ladder and splash a concoction on them that makes them faint, and the next morning, they are found in the pit, leading to their humiliation on live TV. However, Makrandam saw Vishwa's face when he dumped the solution.

Next, Vishwa goes after Seshagiri by posing as an American businessman. Seshagiri sees through his ruse, having learned of Makrandam's defrauding, and claims he cannot be fooled. Vishwa challenges him to give him a ₹10 crore (US$100 million) check on the condition that Seshagiri call the bank beforehand to add extra permission requirements, which he accepts out of arrogance. The initially smug Seshagiri becomes tense over time, checking if the check is deposited, and shows his anger at work and at home. He then wakes up to discover that the check has been portrayed as a donation to charity, creating a national spectacle and leaving him no choice but to allow it to be cashed. The ruling Chief Minister (Sayaji Shinde), jealous that Seshagiri did not give him any money, cancels a contract for a ₹5000 crore (US$50 billion) hydropower project, angering Seshagiri, who decides to partner with Makrandam to figure out how to retaliate.

Finally, Vishwa targets Bhale Babu by revealing his knowledge of the latter's ambition to become Prime Minister of India as well as his secret affair, and convinces him to run in the village elections while acting as his campaign manager. Their main opponent is Parvathalu (Chandra Mohan), a righteous man who decries Bhale Babu's rowdyism through his newspaper Agni. To stop Parvathalu, Vishwa and Bhale Babu force him to sell his newspaper to them and withdraw. But at a press meet for his candidacy's filing, the campaign and manifesto videos are replaced with ones showing his misdeeds. During the chaos, Jahnavi hugs Vishwa, which Chikati Rao, who had secretly followed Vishwa the whole time, reports to Seshagiri and Makrandam. Chikati Rao tries to pin the switch on Vishwa, but it turns out that Vishwa had seen Chikati Rao earlier and instead plants the original videos in his bag, allowing him to escape. Makrandam and Seshagiri then visit Satyanarayana's house and threaten to kill him. They realize they were being recorded, as Vishwa reveals how Parvathalu and others were merely playing roles in the scam. To save themselves, they admit Satyanarayana was wronged and establish a charitable foundation in his name. Vishwa reveals that his parents were victims of the original chit fund's scam, which is why he did not take any fees, and goes back to his life of fraud with a purpose.

== Cast ==
- Allari Naresh as E. Vishwanath aka Vishwa
- Eesha Rebba as Jahnavi
- Brahmanandam as Satyanarayana
- Rao Ramesh as Seshagiri
- Posani Krishna Murali as Bhale Babu
- Tanikella Bharani as Makarandam
- Chandra Mohan as Parvathalu
- Sampoornesh Babu as Tellabbai, Vishwa's assistant
- Srinivas Avasarala as Cheekati, Makarandam's assistant
- Subhalekha Sudhakar as Satyanarayana, Jahnavi's father
- Sayaji Shinde as Chief Minister
- Saptagiri as TV Reporter
- Giri Babu as Rama Chandra Murthy
- Snigdha as Guide
- Khayyum as Venky, Seshagiri's son
- Shraddha Das in a special appearance
- Aryan Rajesh as a businessman who Vishwa conned

== Soundtrack ==
The Music Was Composed By Kalyan Koduri and Released by Lahari Music.

Bandipotu

Soundtrack album by Kalyan Koduri
- Released: 15 Jan 2015
- Recorded: 2015
- Genre: Soundtrack
- Length: 13:55
- Label: Lahari Music
- Producer: Kalyan Koduri

Kalyan Koduri chronology
Oohalu Gusagusalade (2014)	Bandipotu (2015)	Hora Hori (2015)

Track list
No.	Title	Lyrics	Singer(s)	Length
1.	"Dongalni Dochukora"	Sirivennela Seetharama Sastry	Vedala Hemachandra	3:39
2.	"Aedo Mayalle Inade"	Rambabu Gosala	Rahul Nambiar, Rita	3:37
3.	"Petromax Lightingu"	Ramajogayya Sastry	Ramya NSK	3:11
4.	"Alijadalu Chaligilulu"	Ananta Sriram	Kalyan Koduri	3:28
Total length:				13:55

== Reception ==
This film got mostly mixed reviews. jeevi gave 3.25/5, 123 Telugu gave 3/5 and greatandhra gave 2.75.
