= Thaali (1997 film) =

- Theatrical release poster
- Directed by: E. V. V. Satyanarayana
- Written by: Posani Krishna Murali (dialogues)
- Screenplay by: E. V. V. Satyanarayana
- Story by: E. V. V. Satyanarayana
- Produced by: Maganti Venkateswara Rao
- Starring: Srikanth; Swetha; Sneha; Swathi
- Cinematography: Adusumilli Vijay Kumar
- Edited by: K. Ravindra Babu
- Music by: Vidyasagar
- Production company: MRC Movie Creations
- Release date: 24 January 1997
- Running time: 152 mins
- Country: India
- Language: Telugu

Thaali (transl. Wedding Chain) is a 1997 Indian Telugu-language drama film, produced by Maganti Venkateswara Rao under the MRC Movie Creations banner and directed by E. V. V. Satyanarayana. It stars Srikanth, Swetha, Sneha and Swathi, with music composed by Vidyasagar. The film was a box office hit.

== Plot ==
The film is set in a village where Bose Babu (played by Srikanth ) is a wealthy and influential man. He has a longstanding rivalry with Kota (played by Kota Srinivasa Rao), who schemes to marry his daughter Swathi (played by Swathi) to Bose Babu in an attempt to gain control over him. However, Kota soon learns that Bose Babu's marriage has already been arranged with Sneha (played by Sneha), the daughter of Ramaraju (played by Murali Mohan), who was Bose Babu's late father's close friend.

Bose Babu secretly visits Ramaraju's house and mistakenly assumes that Ganga (played by Swetha), an orphan raised by Ramaraju, is his fiancée. When Ramaraju discovers this, he becomes furious, as he is aware that Sneha is in love with Shivaji (played by Srihari), Kota’s son. To prevent Sneha from marrying Shivaji, Ramaraju forces her to marry Bose Babu. However, during the wedding, Sneha removes her wedding chain (thaali) and runs away, leaving Bose Babu and the guests in shock. The incident causes Ramaraju to collapse from distress. To uphold his honor, his loyal follower Ramu (played by Rajendra Prasad) persuades Ganga to step in as Bose Babu’s wife by wearing the wedding chain and entering his household. Meanwhile, Sneha is misled by Shivaji, who turns out to be a fraud, and eventually abandons her.

As time passes, Bose Babu slowly begins to develop feelings for Ganga, but she remains distant from him. Eventually, Ramaraju learns the truth and formally acknowledges Ganga as Bose Babu’s wife, leading to their acceptance as a married couple. Soon, Ganga becomes pregnant. However, things take a shocking turn when Bose Babu suddenly arrives with Sneha and introduces her as his wife. He then reveals the past events—how he found Sneha severely injured and, to ensure her medical treatment, declared her as his wife at the hospital. Unfortunately, she suffered from amnesia, so he brought her home.

Following several humorous and dramatic incidents, Ganga, feeling heartbroken, returns her wedding chain to Sneha and leaves with Ramu. Realizing the depth of his feelings, Bose Babu rushes after her. Meanwhile, Kota and Shivaji attempt to malign Ganga and Ramu’s relationship. At the same time, Sneha regains her memory after seeing Shivaji and realizes his deception. Ramaraju arrives and reveals the truth, just as Ganga gives birth to a baby boy. Bose Babu reunites with Ganga, and the entire family accepts her as his rightful wife. The film concludes on a happy note as Bose Babu ties the wedding chain to Ganga once again, affirming their marriage.

== Cast ==
- Srikanth as Bose Babu
- Swetha as Ganga
- Sneha as Sneha
- Swathi as Swathi
- Rajendra Prasad as Ramu
- Murali Mohan as Ramaraju
- Srihari as Shivaji
- Kota Srinivasa Rao as Kota
- Brahmanandam as Suri Rao
- Mallikarjuna Rao
- Srividya as Seetaratnam

== Soundtrack ==
Thalli

Film score by Vidyasagar
- Released: 1997
- Genre: Soundtrack
- Length: Supreme Music
- Label: 33:54
- Producer: Vidyasagar

Vidyasagar chronology
Akkum Bakkum (1996)	Thalli (1997)	Mama Bagunnava (1997)

Music was composed by Vidyasagar. The song "Guntalakaddi" was reused from composer's own track "Dheemtha Thakita" which he had composed for Tamil film Villadhi villain. The song "Ulle Ulele" was later remade by Vidyasagar for Tamil film Aahaa Enna Porutham.

No.	Title	Lyrics	Singer(s)	Length
1.	"Emaindo Emonamma"	Sirivennela	Chitra, Hariharan	5:20
2.	"Papa Ninne Pattukona"	Shanmukha Sarma	S. P. Balasubrahmanyam, Chitra	5:02
3.	"Ulle Ulele"	Shanmukha Sarma	S. P. Balasubrahmanyam, Chitra	4:50
4.	"Guppu Guppu Guppumandi"	Sirivennela	Mano, Swarnalatha	4:40
5.	"Muddugummaliddaru"	Sirivennela	Gangadhar, Sujatha	4:10
6.	"Guntalakadi Gummadi"	Sirivennela	S. P. Balasubrahmanyam, Swarnalatha	5:12
7.	"Ososi Kanne Sasi"	Shanmukha Sarma	S. P. Balasubrahmanyam, Chitra	4:40
Total length:				33:54

== Awards ==
- Nandi Award for Best Choreographer - Tharun Master
