= Hai (film) =

- Official poster
- Directed by: E. V. V. Satyanarayana
- Written by: Satish Vegesna (dialogues)
- Screenplay by: E. V. V. Satyanarayana
- Story by: E. V. V. Satyanarayana
- Produced by: D. Ramanaidu
- Starring: Aryan Rajesh; Nikita Thukral
- Cinematography: V. Srinivasa Reddy
- Edited by: K. V. Krishna Reddy
- Music by: Koti
- Production company: Suresh Productions
- Release date: 4 May 2002
- Country: India
- Language: Telugu

Hai (Note: Hai is the Indian pronunciation of the greeting Hi.) is a 2002 Indian Telugu-language romantic drama film directed by E. V. V. Satyanarayana. He introduces his son Aryan Rajesh and newcomer Nikita.

== Plot ==
Aryan Rajesh and Priya are in love. Priya's father wants to test if Aryan Rajesh is truly in love with her.

== Cast ==
- Aryan Rajesh as Aryan Rajesh
- Nikita as Priya
- Prakash Raj as Priya's father
- Chandramohan as Aryan's father
- Jayasudha as Aryan's mother
- Brahmanandam
- M. S. Narayana
- Chalapathi Rao
- Mallikarjuna Rao
- L. B. Sriram
- Sana as Priya's mother
- Benarjee
- Khayyum as Aryan's friend
- Chitram Srinu as Aryan's friend
- Babloo as Aryan's friend
- Siva Reddy

== Production ==
The film was clapped on 31 December 2001 on the night of new year. Newcomer Nikita from Mumbai was signed as the heroine. A hotel set was erected in Dubai.

== Soundtrack ==
Music by Koti.

- "Ninnu Choosina" lyrics by Sirivennela Seetharama Sastry and sung by Sandeep and Sujatha.
- "Premalo Paddadurao" lyrics by Surendra Krishna and sung by Sri Ram Prabhu, Tippu, Koti, Murali, Kannan, and Saroja.
- "Hai Re Hai" lyrics by Surendra Krishna and sung by R.P. Patnaik and Usha.
- "Manasoorukode" lyrics by Surendra Krishna and sung by Tippu, Harini.
- "Excuse Me" lyrics by Sirivennela Seetharama Sastry and sung by Devi, Sanjay Krishna Mohan, Raghu, Usha, and Radhika.
- "Tante Padipoya" lyrics by Chandra Bose and sung by Rajesh and Sujatha.

== Reception ==
A critic from Sify opined that "The script and presentation are weak and even the music of Koti is disappointing. Aryan Rajesh needs to brush up his acting and to concentrate on his dancing as his movements lack grace. Nikhita looks glamorous in those skimpy clothes and has the potential to go places". Jeevi of Idlebrain.com wrote that "Over all it's an average film. You can watch it once at your leisure". Kiran Nadella of Full Hyderabad gave the film a negative review and said that "Because every single scene save for some good sceneries will urge you to slide off your chair and smash your skull into the floor, and I bet you will enjoy it better that way". Andhra Today wrote "The director has blown up a very small point in a relationship which really does not sustain to become a story for a movie and hence may not impress the audience. EVV ought to have thought of a better story for a debut movie for his son than this potential flop story. Neither the dialogue nor the treatment add anything more to the movie". Telugu Cinema wrote "Though it sounds interesting when read it was so pale on the screen with EVV’s style of making. EVV tried to make a youth film in his typical style including attempting his typical style of lewd comedy tracks. He failed to play the sensitive and tender emotions, a necessary ingredient in a youth love story".
