= Aaruguru Pativratalu =

- Directed by: E. V. V. Satyanarayana
- Written by: E. V. V. Satyanarayana
- Dialogues by: Janardhana Maharshi
- Produced by: E. V. V. Satyanarayana
- Starring: Krishna Koushik; Anand; Ravi Varma; Ajay Raj; Ajay; Varun; Shanti Rao; Lahari; Neetha; Vidya; Haarika; Amrutha
- Cinematography: Trinetra
- Edited by: V. Nagi Reddy
- Music by: Kamalakar
- Production company: E. V. V. Cinema
- Release date: 6 February 2004
- Running time: 132 minutes
- Country: India
- Language: Telugu

Aaruguru Pativratalu (transl. Six Chastes) is a 2004 Indian Telugu-language romantic drama film directed by E. V. V. Satyanarayana. The film stars several newcomers.

== Plot ==
Six friends reunite after six years when one of them is about to get married. They all sit down and discuss the pros and cons of their marital life with her.

== Cast ==
- Krishna Koushik
- Anand
- Ravi Varma
- Ajay Raj
- Ajay
- Varun
- Shanti Rao
- Lahari
- Neetha
- Vidya Vathi
- Haarika
- Amrutha Anandamayi as Seetha
- Chalapati Rao as Pativratalu's mentor
- L. B. Sriram

== Soundtrack ==
The film notably features no songs and has a score by Kamalakar.

== Reception ==
Jeevi of Idlebrain.com wrote that "EVV should do films that suits his strength than venturing into alien territories". The film failed at box-office.
