= Kithakithalu =

2006 Indian film by E. V. V. Satyanarayana

- Theatrical release poster
- Directed by: E. V. V. Satyanarayana
- Written by: E. V. V. Satyanarayana
- Dialogues by: Satish Vegesna; Nivas; D Nagaraju; Veligonda Srinivas; Balaram; Muralimohan; E. V. V. Satyanarayana
- Produced by: E. V. V. Satyanarayana
- Starring: Allari Naresh; Geetha Singh; Madhu Shalini
- Cinematography: V. Jayaram
- Edited by: Gautham Raju
- Production company: E. V .V. Cinema
- Release date: 5 May 2006
- Running time: 150 minutes
- Country: India
- Language: Telugu

Kithakithalu (transl. Tickles) is a 2006 Indian Telugu-language comedy drama film directed, written, and produced by E. V. V. Satyanarayana. The film stars Allari Naresh, Geetha Singh and Madhu Shalini. The film featured forty-two comedians in supporting roles.

Kithakithalu started divisively but sneaked through with success as the other major summer releases bombed at cinemas. Along with Pokiri, it was the only film which fared well at summer in Telugu cinema.

== Plot ==
Relangi Raja Babu is such a "nice guy" that he files a case against a girl who attempted to harass him, and did not succumb to her, because he wished to remain "pure" for the woman he marries. After landing a job as an SI, his parents force him to get married because his dowry will be useful for his sister's wedding. No girl wants to marry him now, because they wonder if he is man enough since he rejected a girl like her. He ends up marrying a rich, plump girl Soundarya after his parents and family threaten to commit suicide if he doesn't accept the proposal. Now this "nice guy" suddenly turns to other women and wants to divorce his fat wife. His attempts to make her grant him a divorce and whether he turns over a new leaf is the rest of the story.

== Cast ==
- Allari Naresh as SI Relangi Raja Babu
- Geetha Singh as Soundarya
- Madhu Shalini as Rambha
- Brahmanandam as Broker
- Giri Babu as Rama Chandra Murthy, Raja Babu's father
- Dharmavarapu Subramanyam as SP Balasubramanyam
- Krishna Bhagavan as S. Nagesh
- Jaya Prakash Reddy as S. V. Ranga Rao "SVR", Soundarya's father
- AVS as Chidatala Apparao, Soundarya's neighbour
- L. B. Sriram as Veturi Sitarama Sastry
- Lakshmipati as Nana Patekar / Aryan Rajesh, Car driver
- Mallikarjuna Rao as ASI
- Kondavalasa Lakshmana Rao as Head Constable K. Lakshmana Rao
- Naramalli Sivaprasad as Police officer
- Rama Prabha as Raja Babu's grandmother
- Sana as Raja Babu's mother
- Raghu Babu as Rajanala, Raja Babu's advocate
- Uttej
- Satyam Rajesh as Auto driver
- Visweswara Rao as Saree store worker
- Gundu Sudarshan
- Jayalalitha as Shakeela's advocate
- Rajitha as Jyotilakshmi
- Allari Subhashini as Bipasha Basu, Chidatala Appa Rao's wife
- Kalpana as Silk Shakeela
- Ali as Room boy
- Babu Mohan as House owner
- M. S. Narayana as Nagarjuna "Nag", Soundarya's grandfather
- Sunil as Sathi
- Chalapathi Rao as Judge
- Venu Madhav as a chain-snatching thief
- Gundu Hanumantha Rao
- Telangana Shakuntala as Leelarani
- Rekha
- Rajani
- Archana
- Mada Venkateswara Rao in a deleted scene

== Production ==
A different silent film of the same titled entered production in 2003 with Aditya Om as the director, who also starred in the film alongside Nandana Sen. The film was renamed Mr. Lonely Miss Lovely (2004).

The muhurtam shot for this film took place on 16 January 2006 at E. V. V. Cinema. Six dialogue writers worked on the film. The last schedule took place at Le Palais Royal in Hyderabad.

== Soundtrack ==
The film features no separate soundtrack and reuses several songs from older films.

== Release and reception ==
The film was initially scheduled to release on 28 April 2006.

A critic from Telugucinema.com called the film "A time pass movie" and added that "In these times of gory (blood) films, Kitakitalu is a non-injurious film". A critic from Cinegoer.com wrote that "This movie would have done well had it been released in the 70s or even the 80s. Two decades ago it might have been humorous, but not now. The subject itself is stale, the comedy is not up to EVV's potential, and the actors don't have exceptionally funny dialogues or even good timing".
