= Anu Mehta =

Indian actress, model from 2003 to 2008

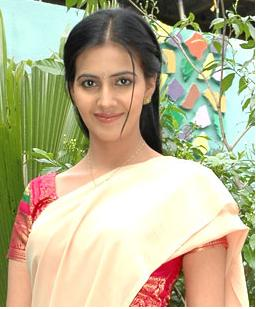
- Occupations: Actress; model
- Years active: 2003–2008

Anuradha Mehta is an Indian actress and former model who appeared in Telugu and Kannada films.

== Career ==
Anu Mehta made her debut with the Telugu movie Arya, by which she gained popularity and applause for her performance.

After the success of Arya, she appeared in 2005 Telugu romance film Nuvvante Naakishtam, written, produced and directed by E. V. V. Satyanarayana. She starred along with Aryan Rajesh, Allari Naresh, Rama Prabha, and Suman. In July 2005, with inclusion of Satyanarayana's sons Rajesh and Naresh, the film was reported as almost ready.

She made her Kannada debut with the 2006 Kannada language action film, Ajay. She paired opposite Puneeth Rajkumar. The film was the remake of Telugu movie Okkadu.

The 2008 Kannada film Honganasu was the last film of her career.

== Filmography ==
List of Anu Mehta film credits
Year	Title	Role	Language
2004	Arya	Geeta	Telugu
2005	Nuvvante Naakishtam	Radha	Telugu
2006	Ajay	Padma/Paddu	Kannada
2007	Maharajasri	Anu	Telugu
2007	Veduka	Ammu	Telugu
2008	Honganasu	Sowmya	Kannada
