= Chala Bagundi =

- Directed by: E. V. V. Satyanarayana
- Written by: Janardhan Maharshi (dialogues)
- Screenplay by: E. V. V. Satyanarayana
- Story by: E. V. V. Satyanarayana
- Produced by: E. V. V. Satyanarayana
- Starring: Srikanth; Vadde Naveen; Malavika; Asha Saini
- Cinematography: C. Ramprasad
- Music by: Koti
- Production company: E. V .V. Cinema
- Release date: 18 February 2000
- Country: India
- Language: Telugu

Chala Bagundi is a 2000 Indian Telugu-language comedy film directed and produced by E. V. V. Satyanarayana. The film stars Srikanth, Vadde Naveen, Malavika and Asha Saini. The film was a hit at the box office and was remade in Kannada as Bahala Chennagide with Shivrajkumar. The film won two Nandi Awards.

== Plot ==
Sivaji (Vadde Naveen) is an orphan and a child laborer, who saves Vamsi's (Srikanth) father, Prasad from an accident despite his employer's wishes of not getting involved. Sivaji is left behind after his angry employer leaves him and manages to save Prasad (Vamsi's dad) by hailing help. Vamsi's parents, grateful for his timely rescue, take Sivaji home and treats him as their own son. Sivaji has only one condition – he will stay only if they don't object to his drinking.

Sivaji and Vamsi share a strong bond of friendship growing up. Vamsi is a teetotaler and together with Sivaji they look after their father's business, which blooms under their smart governance. Sivaji stays separately in a rented room once he is old enough as he hates to show his drinking/hangover side to their parents. The friends share a pact wherein their respective brides should be chosen by the other. Vamsi tries to set Sivaji up for marriage, but the girl rejects him because of Sivaji's drinking issue. Meanwhile, Vamsi comes across Seetha (Malavika) a naive girl fresh from the village, when she attends an interview for a posting in his company, and falls for her instantly. The same night Sivaji, who leaves the bar drunk due to a cyclone warning and heavy rainfall comes across Seetha who asks for a ride to the railway station. She had to go back to her village the very same day and the auto she was travelling in broke down. Seetha soon realizes that Sivaji is drunk driving and becomes wary of his intentions. Sivaji, under the influence takes a diversion from the route, pulls over in an abandoned area and tries to force himself on Seetha. Vamsi, who was unable to reach Sivaji at his home, tries at the bar he frequents and finds out that Sivaji left already drunk while purchasing another bottle of liquor. Vamsi tries to follow up by driving to places he thinks Sivaji might visit, as he is concerned about his friend. He misses Sivaji and Seetha, even though he stops in their vicinity. Sivaji injures Seetha during the sexual assault that leaves deep scratches on her shoulders and midriff. Seetha finally manages to escape Sivaji by hitting him on the head with a rock and leaves.

The next day Vamsi finds an injured Sivaji and takes him to a hospital. Sivaji, who is remorseful and regrets his drunken actions vows to never touch alcohol, a decision that his family is extremely happy about. Vamsi along with his family leaves to attend the wedding of their family friend, and meets Seetha there. They like her and decide to finalize Vamsi and Seetha's marriage only if Sivaji approves; they make sure to mention this to Seetha's family prior to the meeting. Sivaji is obviously shocked to find Seetha here and leaves the meeting in daze causing Vamsi to think Seetha has been disapproved. Sivaji realizes that Vamsi likes Seetha a lot and after she convinces him to forget about their unfortunate meeting and to not ruin her future, Sivaji fibs about faking his upset reaction and gives Vamsi his blessing.

Once Vamsi and Seetha get married, she starts taking revenge on Sivaji, her goal – to separate the best friends and get Sivaji to suffer restless nights like she did. Sivaji bears everything Seetha does in silence. She adds salt to coffee instead of sugar and denies taking money that Sivaji had given her on Vamsi's orders, making him seem like a thief, etc. Despite it all, Vamsi treats Sivaji like a god and that makes Seetha super mad that none of her ploys were working. Sivaji eventually marries Ganga (Asha) the mentally challenged daughter of his landlord once he learns about her past – she has been sexually assaulted on her way to marriage two years ago and had been in this state (Ganga keeps asking every guy she meets to marry her) since. Vamsi is against the marriage citing he had previously only joked about Sivaji marrying her, that he deserves better – someone who can keep him happy. Sivaji is adamant and convinces his family to accept Ganga as his partner. Vamsi brings the newly married couple to his house so he and Seetha could keep an eye and guide them through any initial rough patches. Seetha gives Ganga terrible advice that results in Sivaji being slapped and bitten till blood is drawn. Sivaji leaves their house early next morning as he is uncomfortable living there.

Vamsi and Ganga's dad visit the doctor who reveals it might be difficult to cure Ganga since a lot of time has passed without any treatment. The doctor suggests that her husband should play the role of a doctor now and that by invoking sexual feelings and attractions in Ganga, there is a possibility of her cure. Meanwhile, Sivaji approaches Seetha when Vamsi is away and starts groveling at her feet. He begs her to not let him be the reason her marriage gets into trouble (Vamsi and Seetha argue and fight a lot over Sivaji) and that he would do anything to make her happy. Seetha asks Sivaji to leave, since Vamsi treats him as a god, he should disappear like one.

Sivaji, although anguished and miserable with the ultimatum, heeds her words and leaves with Ganga to places unknown. Vamsi who tries to surprise Sivaji at midnight on his birthday gets a rude shock. He tries everywhere, but Sivaji is gone. One day, the watchman of his gated community approaches Vamsi and informs him of having witnessed Sivaji visiting Seetha and then later leaving in tears. Vamsi, furious that Seetha has information regarding Sivaji's disappearance, yells at her to tell the truth. Seetha, pissed off that Vamsi holds Sivaji on a pedestal, speaks of the true nature of her first encounter with Sivaji and that the scratches on her body she told were from a mad dog is actually the work of his best friend. Vamsi then reveals, he had known about it from the start. Vamsi had overheard Seetha, when she promises to put Sivaji through hell the very next day of her marriage with Vamsi. He explains how he had been aware of everything Seetha did to inflict pain on his friend and how he had suffered in silence. He even mentions that had he known of this incident sooner he would have somehow convinced her to marry Sivaji. Vamsi finally screams that he had enough and if she has a problem with his friend then he has no room for her in his life. Vamsi's parents try to convince her that Sivaji is not a bad person. He has made a mistake concerning her and he was remorseful and did everything in his power to do penance for it, even marrying a rape victim – in order to give her a happy marital life which would otherwise be denied to her. (Back then and even now, some people tend to think that if a woman is raped then her life is done with- in regards to marriage and otherwise) Vamsi and his parents (indirectly) mention that Sivaji made an unintentional mistake under influence, for which he tried making amends, but Seetha has made plenty of mistakes, knowingly and she has even caused turmoil to another lady's (Ganga) marriage. How is she any better and can't she really forgive Sivaji?

Seetha, concerned for her husband and regrettable of her actions, goes to Ganga's father and begs him to tell her about Sivaji's whereabouts, which he finally does. Sivaji lives in a humble lodgings in Vizag and works as a lorry driver. Ganga gets cured once she and Sivaji sleep together. Seetha reaches their place and ties a rakhi to Sivaji, proclaiming him as her brother and to save her husband, who had taken to writing Sivaji's name all over their bedroom wall in his blood. Sivaji rushes to Hyderabad and his sheer proximity is enough for Vamsi to regain consciousness. The usual breakdown of sentimental feelings, pleas and forgiveness takes place and they all live happily ever after.

== Cast ==
- Srikanth as Vamsi
- Vadde Naveen as Sivaji
- Malavika as Seetha
- Asha Saini as Ganga
- M. S. Narayana
- L.B. Sriram as Seetha's father
- Chandra Mohan as Prasad – Vamsi's Father
- Kota Srinivasa Rao as Ganga's father
- Sudha as Ganga's mother
- Chalapathi Rao as Prasad's Village friend
- Prabha
- Suma Kanakala as Vijaya Lakshmi
- Ravi Babu as Rapist
- Tanikella Bharani as Auto Driver
- Devadas Kanakala as Ganga's Doctor
- Master Tanish as Child Sivaji
- Master Koushik as Child Vamsi
- Lawrence Raghavendra in a special appearance in the song "Yentabagundi Basu"
- Mumtaj in a special appearance in the song "Yentabagundi Basu"

== Music ==
The music of the film was composed by Koti.

No	Song title	Lyricist	Singers	Duration
1	"Daayamma Daayi"	Samaveda Shanmuga Sharma	S. P. Balasubrahmanyam, Chitra	5:08
2	"Daaham Daaha"	Bhuvanachandra	S. P. Balasubrahmanyam, Chitra	4:39
3	"Dave Darevede"	Sirivennela Sitaramasastri	S. P. Balasubrahmanyam, Sangeetha	5:31
4	"Sreekaram Edi Maro"	Sirivennela Sitaramasastri	Parthasarathy, Gopika Poornima	5:13
5	"Eai Rukkamma Chukkamma"	Sirivennela Sitaramasastri	Chitra	4:24
6	"Yentabagundi Basu Nee Figuru"	Bhuvanachandra	S. P. Balasubrahmanyam	4:20

== Reception ==
A critic from Sify wrote that "Top-ranking director EVV. Satyanarayana has turned producer with Chala Bagundi and churned out a good emotional film with Srikanth and Naveen breathing life into their characters. The message is that 'friendship' is more sacred than any other relationship in the world. Naveen leaves everyone behind and walks away with the acting honours but Srikanth wins the sympathy of the audience at the end". Jeevi of Idlebrain.com rated the film 4 out of 5 and wrote, "EVV proved that stamina of small big film with 'Chala Bagundi'. He gave us a complete product in the form of Chala Bagundi. He direction takes a new dimension in terms of slickness in this film".

== Awards ==
Nandi Awards – 2000

- Best Choreographer – Tara
- Best Male Comedian – L.B. Sriram
