= Leela Mahal Centre =

2004 Indian Telugu-language film directed by Devi Prasad

- VCD cover
- Directed by: Devi Prasad
- Written by: Devi Prasad; Satish Vegesna (dialogues)
- Story by: Saran
- Based on: Amarkkalam (Tamil)
- Produced by: CHS Mohan
- Starring: Aryan Rajesh; Sadha
- Cinematography: Kantheti Shankar
- Edited by: Nandamuri Hari
- Music by: S. A. Rajkumar
- Production company: Medha Media
- Release date: 4 December 2004
- Running time: 137 minutes
- Country: India
- Language: Telugu

Leela Mahal Centre (Note: The film is alternately spelled Leela Mahal Center.) is a 2004 Indian Telugu-language action romance directed by Devi Prasad and starring Aryan Rajesh and Sadha. The film is a remake of the 1999 Tamil film Amarkkalam.

== Plot ==
Prabhu has a troubled childhood with divorced parents. His mother marries another man. Upset that he has to call his stepfather as his own father, he leaves his house at a young age. He grows up to be a thug who works at Leela Mahal Centre, a cinema theatre. GK, a former Mumbai-based don, was sent to jail by his own friend, Sudheer. GK tells Prabhu to kidnap Anjali, a violinist. She is initially disturbed by Prabhu and starts to fall in love with him after Singhamalai tells Anjali about Prabhu's past life. A terrorist gang comes to kidnap Anjali as a bargain for their fellow friends in jail. How Prabhu fights the gang and saves Anjali forms the rest of the story. It is revealed that Anjali is none other than GK's daughter. GK & Sudheer become friends again.

== Cast ==
- Aryan Rajesh as Prabhu
  - Teja Sajja as young Prabhu
- Sadha as Anjali
- Atul Kulkarni as GK
- Suman as Sudheer
- Brahmanandam as Singhamalai, Prabhu's right-hand man
- Dharmavarapu Subramanyam as Leela Mahal Centre's manager
- Surya as Anjali's relative
- Krishna Bhagawan as Bujji
- Raghu Babu as Prabhu's friend
- M. S. Narayana as Leela Mahal Centre visitor
- Sheeba as Anjali's relative
- Pragathi as Sudheer's wife
- Surekha Vani as Prabhu's mother
- Sameer Hasan as Prabhu's father
- Karate Kalyani as Manga
- Prudhvi Raj as Terrorist
- Hema as GK's wife
- Robert (cameo in song "Balamanemo")

== Production ==
The film is directed by Devi Prasad, who previously directed Aaduthu Paaduthu. The film got stuck in production before ultimately releasing in 2004. Aryan Rajesh, who plays the lead in the film was yet to reach the limelight prior to the film's release due to the box office failures of his previous films. In 2004 prior to the release of Donga Dongadi, Sadha, who starred in Jayam, was yet to bag stardom in the Telugu film industry.

== Soundtrack ==
Leela Mahal Center

Soundtrack album by S. A. Rajkumar
- Released: 2004
- Recorded: 2004
- Genre: Feature film soundtrack
- Length: 21:51
- Language: Telugu
- Label: Surya Music
- Producer: S. A. Rajkumar

S. A. Rajkumar chronology
Chatrapathy (2004)	Leela Mahal Center (2004)	Cheppave Chirugali (2004)

The songs are composed by S. A. Rajkumar. The songs "Babuji Zara Dheere Chalo" from Dum and "Mabbe Masakesindile" from Vayasu Pilichindi were combined for the song "Palamalaimu". The lyrics were written by Suddala Ashokteja, Sai Sriharsha, and I.S. Murthy. The song "Thummeda Rekkalanadugu" rendered by S. P. Balasubrahmanyam is based on the Telugu poem of the same name. In a review of the film's soundtrack, a critic from The Hindu stated that "A well-crafted (combined) effort by the composers and the lyricists ... gives music-loving Telugus some good compositions." The song "O Hampy Bomma" is based on "Sangeetha Vanil" from Chinna Poove Mella Pesu.

No.	Title	Singer(s)	Length
1.	"Palamalaimu (Balamanemo)"	Shankar Mahadevan, Malini	4:18
2.	"Chitti Chilakamma"	S. P. Balasubrahmanyam	3:04
3.	"Thummeda"	Udit Narayan, Sujatha	4:33
4.	"O Hampy Bomma"	Hariharan, Sujatha	3:44
5.	"Chitti Chilakamma (Bit)"	Deepika	0:59
6.	"Srimalle Puvvalle"	K. S. Chithra	4:50
7.	"Paramapavani"	Kalpana	0:23
Total length:			21:51

== Reception and box office ==
The Hindu wrote that "Aryan Rajesh performs the role with ease and Sada looks beautiful. Atul Kulkarni fares well". Idlebrain gave the film a rating of three out of five and wrote that " Devi Prasad should be appreciated for making a decent film in spite of undue delays and obstacles that dogged the progress of this film".

Unlike Rajesh's previous films, this film was a success at the box office.
