= Nuvvante Naakishtam =

- Poster
- Directed by: E. V. V. Satyanarayana
- Written by: E. V. V. Satyanarayana
- Dialogues by: Satish Vegesna
- Produced by: E. V. V. Satyanarayana
- Starring: Aryan Rajesh; Allari Naresh; Anuradha Mehta; Ali; Krishna Bhagavan; Bhuvaneswari
- Cinematography: V. Srinivasa Reddy
- Edited by: Nagi Reddy
- Music by: Koti
- Production company: EVV CInema
- Release date: 12 August 2005 (India)
- Running time: 151 minutes
- Country: India
- Language: Telugu

Nuvvante Naakishtam (transl. I like you) is a 2005 Indian Telugu-language romance film written, produced and directed by E. V. V. Satyanarayana. The film stars the director's son Aryan Rajesh, along with Allari Naresh, Anu Mehta, Rama Prabha, and Suman.

== Plot ==
When wealthy NRI Yuvaraj (Aryan Rajesh) comes to a village seeking a bride for himself, he finds a suitable choice in Radha (Anuradha Mehta). But she is in love with Devudu (Allari Naresh), a man thought to be dead. This is because of her father who doesn't want his daughter to marry a poor guy. He sends Devudu for earning money with the inherent idea of getting rid of him in the city. Devudu survives and leaves Singapore in a ship for earning money. When Devudu returns, the questions arise, why was he thought to be dead, and was it because somebody wished him out of their way?

== Cast ==
- Aryan Rajesh as Yuvaraj
- Allari Naresh as Devudu
- Anu Mehta as Radha
- L.B. Sriram as Bindela Babu Rao
- Ali as Subbu
- Krishna Bhagavan as Datthudu
- Bhuvaneswari as thadikela Satyavathi
- Chalapathi Rao as JP
- Chandra Mohan as Master
- Hema as Krishnaveni
- Kondavalasa Lakshmana Rao
- Lakshmipati
- Mallikharjuna Rao
- M.S. Narayana as NV Sastry
- Satyam Rajesh as Veerababu
- Rama Prabha as manikyam
- Sangeetha
- A.V.S.
- Suman as Chowdhary
- Tulasi
- Gajala as Radha

== Production ==
The muhurat took place at Korumamidi, West Godavari District (hometown of E. V. V. Satyanarayana) on 2 April 2005.

== Soundtrack ==
Nuvvante Naakishtam

Soundtrack album by Koti
- Released: 2005
- Recorded: 2005
- Genre: Soundtrack
- Length: 34:28
- Label: Aditya Music
- Producer: Koti

Music composed by Koti and released on Aditya Music. The audio launch took place on 10 July 2005 in Film Nagar, Hyderabad with several guests including N. T. Rama Rao Jr, Ravi Teja, Kinjarapu Ram Mohan Naidu, Tarun, V. V. Vinayak, Rajasekhar, Nandamuri Kalyan Ram, Srinu Vaitla, Prabhu Deva, Raghavendra Lawrence, MS Raju, Rohit, Sivaji, Siva Balaji, Smita, Jeevitha, Maganti Venkateswara Rao, and Sridhar Lagadapati.

Track-List
| No. | Title | Lyrics | Singer(s) | Length |
|---|---|---|---|---|
| 1. | "Ollo Dallo" | Madhuphala | Udit Narayan, Sadhana Sargam | 5:17 |
| 2. | "Endhukey Paruvama" | Veturi | KK, K. S. Chitra | 5:53 |
| 3. | "Manasichavanuko" | Sai Sri Harsha | Sonu Nigam, S. P. Balasubrahmanyam, Sadhana Sargam | 6:05 |
| 4. | "Choopultho" | Madhuphala | KK, Shalini | 6:21 |
| 5. | "Nee Navvu Poolavnam" | Kandikonda | Sonu Nigam, Sangeetha | 6:13 |
| 6. | "Thidatharu" | Viswa | Vishwa Deepak | 4:39 |
| Total length: | | | | 34:28 |

== Reception ==
Jeevi of Idlebrain.com rated the film 3/5 and wrote "On a whole, it makes an average flick".

Indian Movies found that as a confused Non-resident Indian seeking a wife Aryan Rajesh was okay but it was Allari Naresh as Anu Mehta's love Devudu, returned from presumed death, who "steals the show". They concluded that Anu's Radha "doesn't have much to do".
