= 2 Hours Love =

2019 Indian romance film

- Film poster
- Directed by: Sri Pawar
- Written by: Sri Pawar
- Starring: Sri Pawar; Kriti Garg
- Cinematography: Praveen vanamali
- Edited by: Syam Vadavalli
- Music by: Gyaani Singh
- Production company: Srinika Creative Works.
- Release date: 6 September 2019
- Running time: 151 minutes
- Country: India
- Language: Telugu

2 Hours Love is a 2019 Indian Telugu-language romantic film released on 6 Sep, 2019. The movie is directed by Sri Pawar and featured Sri Pawar, Kriti Garg, Tanikella Bharani and Narsing Yadav as lead characters.

== Plot ==
The story of two lovers and their agreement to only spend 2 hours a day with each other every day. These 2 hours will not involve any family members or friends. They will remain strangers to each other for the entire day except for those 2 hours from 4 PM to 6 PM. The 1st half of the movie depicts that how the boy named Adit (Sri Pawar) falls in love with the girl named Avika (Kriti Garg) who keeps the condition of 2 hours love concept to be in a relationship with the boy. He reluctantly agrees but goes through great agitation (as neither he has seen nor been accustomed to this process of romantic relationship). He plots his fake suicide to insist the girl to put an end to her condition. The girl gives in and quashes the condition. The 2nd half of the movies depicts the life of the Adit and Avika before the abovementioned story. Both of them fall in love with each other at the first sight. They start developing a typical romantic relationship. Soon Adit faces issues in the relationship as he feels Avika is ignoring him and not giving him enough time. This leads to frequent fights between the two. So much so that he breaks up with her. After a while Avika gets to know about Adit’s accident and the fact that he lost his memory and doesn’t remember her at all. As we move forward with the movie, it is revealed that 1st half of the movie was all a plan of Avika for not losing Adit again from her life. 1st half is how Avika brings him in her life again. When Adit regains his memory, he disapproves of her plans and leaves her. At one moment or the other they bump into each other whereby Adit always avoids her. He is not at peace as somewhere he still loves her and wants her but his fear of previous issues, doesn’t let him agree with his inner most desires. Gradually with the help of family friends and some situations, they both get to confront each other. After some arguments they reunite.

== Cast ==
- Sri Pawar as Adit
- Kriti Garg as Avika
- Tanikella Bharani as Bharani
- Narsing Yadav as Narsing
- Ashok vardan as Vasu

== Soundtrack ==
No.	Title	Singer(s)	Length
1.	"Ee Gaale"	Anurag Kulkarni, Nutana Mohan
2.	"Ninnu Choodagane"	Anurag Kulkarni
3.	"Yemani Manase"	Nutana Mohan, Ravi Prakash Chodima...
4.	"Premake - O Maya Prema" (Female)	Nutana Mohan
5.	"2 Hours Love - Endhi Ra E Kadha"	Hymath, Gyaani Singh
6.	"Premake - Yemainadho Madhi" (Male)	Pruthvi Chandra
