= Appula Appa Rao =

1992 film by E. V. V. Satyanarayana

- VCD Cover
- Directed by: E.V.V. Satyanarayana
- Written by: L. B. Sriram (dialogues)
- Screenplay by: E. V. V. Satyanarayana; Ramani
- Story by: E. V. V. Satyanarayana
- Produced by: G. Anand Babu, S. Udayakumar; Rama Prabha (presents)
- Starring: Rajendra Prasad; Shobana
- Cinematography: V. Srinivasa Reddy
- Edited by: K. Ravindra Babu
- Music by: Rajan–Nagendra
- Production company: Kamadhenu Creations
- Release date: 24 January 1992
- Running time: 140 mins
- Country: India
- Language: Telugu

Appula Appa Rao (transl. 'Debtor Appa Rao') is a 1992 Telugu-language comedy film directed by E. V. V. Satyanarayana. The film stars Rajendra Prasad and Shobana, with music composed by Rajan–Nagendra. Released on 24 January 1992, the film became a blockbuster at the box office and is regarded as a popular comedy in Telugu cinema.

== Plot ==
The film begins with Appa Rao, a habitual welsher, whose life revolves around borrowing money to meet his daily needs. His home is constantly filled with debtors, and he has become adept at evading their demands. One evening, Appa Rao encounters Subba Lakshmi, a determined constable, who slaps him for his involvement with criminals she is pursuing. Soon after, Appa Rao meets a fortune teller named Sastry, whose predictions take an unexpected turn when his sinister brother, Irogleg, enters the scene. Sastry foretells that a woman will slap Appa Rao three times and that she will become his wife, bringing him wealth. Meanwhile, an alcoholic wanderer named Brahmaji casts doubt on Sastry's prophecy.

Appa Rao and Subba Lakshmi cross paths again over a lottery ticket worth ₹10 lakh, which accidentally gets torn. The seller advises them to keep the two halves and share the prize if it wins. When the ticket is announced as a winner, Appa Rao devises a plan to deceive Subba Lakshmi and claim her half with a fabricated story. However, Subba Lakshmi willingly hands over her half, knowing from a newspaper update that the ticket did not actually win. Misunderstanding her actions as an act of pure generosity, Appa Rao is touched and begins to fall for her. Subba Lakshmi, in turn, starts developing feelings for him. However, when Appa Rao attempts to kiss her, she slaps him again. Confused and seeking clarity, Appa Rao consults Sastry, who, despite his brother's meddling, confirms that the prophecy about the slaps is indeed accurate.

As they prepare for their marriage, Appa Rao faces interference from Irogleg, and Sastry warns him that his fiancée will face a death penalty. Desperate to avoid this grim fate, Appa Rao seeks Sastry's advice, who suggests marrying a dying woman to break the curse. Appa Rao then tries various schemes but is unsuccessful. By chance, he encounters Ammaji, an elderly woman with four daughters—Bangari, Bujji, Pandu, and Baby. The eldest, Bangari, is a cancer patient, and Appa Rao sees an opportunity. He cunningly marries Bangari, believing her to be on the brink of death. However, on their wedding night, Appa Rao, still uncertain of his fate, calls Irogleg to confirm his belief. To his surprise, Bangari does not die. Realizing that Ammaji had misled him about her health, Appa Rao demands a divorce, but Ammaji says he can divorce Bangari only after marrying off her other daughters.

Initially, Appa Rao attempts to arrange marriages for the three girls by pairing them with beggars, but his plan is quickly exposed. The girls, however, make it clear that they will only marry their true loves. The first girl is in love with a man who has conflicts with his elders: his father Eswara Sastry, an orthodox man and a classical musician; his mother Mangatayaru, a fan of Chiranjeevi; and his grandmother Sony, who is passionate about pop music. The second girl is in love with the son of MLA Nadendla Anjayya, one of Appa Rao’s debtors, who demands a dowry of ₹1 lakh. The third girl’s love interest is a man whom she saw in her dreams.

Subba Lakshmi grows suspicious upon seeing Appa Rao with Bangari but is outsmarted as he successfully conceals the truth. Joining forces, Appa Rao and Subba Lakshmi work to arrange the three marriages. They cleverly win over Eswara Sastry, Mangatayaru, and Sony by catering to their unique interests while blackmailing Eswara Sastry by threatening to reveal his affair with his mistress. Appa Rao further manipulates his landlord, Thatha Rao, by turning him against Anjayya and devising a plan to secure the dowry demanded by Anjayya from Anjayya himself. Eventually, Appa Rao identifies the third girl’s love interest as a bumbling thief and, with Subba Lakshmi’s assistance, apprehends him.

The three marriages take place at the same venue, leading to several twists. Bangari attempts to subdue Appa Rao with medicine, but it accidentally mixes with cool drinks, causing confusion. Ammaji announces Brahmaji as her husband, who has fled from his responsibilities. Anjayya eventually discovers the fraud, but Appa Rao cleverly handles the situation. Meanwhile, Appa Rao clears his debts by having Anjayya pay them off in exchange for votes in his favour. Eventually, Irogleg arrives to collect his fee but is dragged away. To everyone’s surprise, Subba Lakshmi reveals herself as Ammaji’s eldest daughter, who orchestrated the entire scheme to help her family using Appa Rao’s wit. Since Bangari is naive, Subba Lakshmi arranged her marriage to Appa Rao. In the end, Appa Rao is left puzzled when Sastry suggests he marry Subba Lakshmi. The film concludes happily as Appa Rao marries both women.

== Cast ==
- Rajendra Prasad as Appula Appa Rao
- Shobana as Subba Lakshmi
- Sindhuja as Bangari
- Brahmanandam as Sastry
- Babu Mohan as Nadendla Anjayya
- Ali as lottery ticket seller
- Tanikella Bharani as Chilipi Donga
- Mallikarjuna Rao as Thatha Rao
- J. V. Somayajulu as Eswara Sastry
- Suthi Velu as Brahmaji
- Ironleg Sastri as Iron leg Sastri
- Potti Prasad
- Chidatala Appa Rao as "Jyothi Chithra"
- Annapoorna as Mangatayaru
- Ramaprabha as Ammaji
- Jayalalita as Thatha Rao's wife
- Chandrika as Savitri
- Lathasri as Chitti
- Siva Parvathi

== Production ==
Certain plot points in the film are inspired by the 1957 romantic comedy Ten Thousand Bedrooms. The film was presented by Rama Prabha, with E. V. V. Satyanarayana providing the screenplay and L. B. Sriram penning the dialogues.

== Music ==
Appula Appa Rao

Soundtrack album by Rajan–Nagendra
- Released: 1992
- Genre: Soundtrack
- Length: 36:04
- Label: Surya Music
- Producer: Rajan–Nagendra

The music was composed by Rajan–Nagendra and released on Surya Recording Company label.

Track list
No.	Title	Lyrics	Singer(s)	Length
1.	"Appucheyani"	Veturi	S. P. Balasubrahmanyam	5:15
2.	"Osi Naa Subbalakshmi"	Veturi	S. P. Balasubrahmanyam, K. S. Chithra	5:06
3.	"Moodo Debba Kottaaka"	Bhuvana Chandra	S. P. Balasubrahmanyam, K. S. Chithra	5:06
4.	"Tholi Niguthu"	Bhuvana Chandra	S. P. Balasubrahmanyam, K. S. Chithra	5:55
5.	"Rara O Gang leader"	Veturi	S. Janaki	4:50
6.	"Rambhaho Ho Ho Ho"	Sahithi	S. P. Balasubrahmanyam, Madavapeddi Ramesh, Ramana, S. P. Sailaja, Subha, Radhika	9:45
Total length:				36:00
