= Evadi Gola Vaadidhi =

- Directed by: E. V. V. Satyanarayana
- Screenplay by: E. V. V. Satyanarayana
- Dialogues by: Janardhana Maharshi
- Story by: Larsco Entertainments Unit
- Produced by: Sridhar Lagadapati
- Starring: Aryan Rajesh; Deepika
- Cinematography: V. Srinivasa Reddy
- Music by: Kamalakar
- Production company: Larsco Entertainments
- Release date: 21 January 2005
- Country: India
- Language: Telugu
- Box office: ₹10 crore distributors' share

Evadi Gola Vaadidhi is a 2005 Telugu language comedy film directed by E.V.V. Satyanarayana. It stars Aryan Rajesh and Deepika supported by Chalapathi Rao, Brahmanandam, Kondavalasa, Ali and Jaya Prakash Reddy. This film was a commercial success and ran for 100 days in many theaters.

== Plot ==
Seetharam owns a popular hotel in Bangkok but has a fierce competitor in Sairam, who owns a rivaling hotel across the street. As his hotel struggles from a lack of guests, Sairam has a bomb planted in Seetharam's hotel in hopes of destroying the competition.

Meanwhile, we meet various guests staying in Seetharam's hotel.

An eager actress Kameshwari, her husband, the stingy producer Thuppu Apparao, and an aspiring writer-director, Alankar, are staying at the hotel. Over the course of their stay, Alankar pitches the plot of a movie. Kameshwari falls in love with Alankar's enthusiasm and eventually leaves Thuppu Apparao for him.

Veera Shankar is a young man arranged to marry the daughter of Rayalaseema factionist Bakka Reddy, but he instead falls in love with Aarti, a staff member in their household. He escapes to Bangkok out of frustration.

Banda Reddy, Baka Reddy's brother, is also staying at the hotel, hiding from enemies seeking to kill him in Rayalaseema.

Gowri Shankar is an unhappily married man. His wife, Kadapa Redamma, another Rayalaseema factionist, forced his hand in marriage and dominates their relationship. Wanting to feel like a man again, he comes to Bangkok alone and arranges to meet a prostitute in the hotel.

Finally, Shankar Dada, a professional assassin, comes to the hotel with his assistant, Kasi, on a job. He has been hired by Gangadharam to kill his wife, Leela Rani, who is also staying at the hotel.

Aarti turns out to be the woman that Gowri Shankar hired as a prostitute. Though she abhors the arrangement, she is desperate to pay her mother's hospital bills. By accident, she goes to Veera Shankar's room instead. Veera Shankar assures her that he does not want her services as a prostitute, but would be happy to pay for her mother's hospital bills. Aarti falls in love with Veera Shankar's generosity and the two become a couple.

Meanwhile, Gowri Shankar mistakes a maid at the hotel for the prostitute he hired. Though the maid is confused, she is overjoyed when Gouri Shankar gives her large sums of cash for her company. These two become a couple as well.

Kadapa Rayalamma and her goons arrive in Bangkok and storm the hotel, looking to kill Banda Reddy. When Kadapa Rayalamma runs into Banda Reddy, it is revealed that Banda Reddy was her former flame. Gowri Shankar convinces the two to become a couple rather than fight, allowing both Gowri Shankar and Kadapa Rayalamma to dissolve their marriage and form two happier relationships.

Shankar Dada makes many attempts on Leela Rani's life, but is always thwarted by near misses. When he has a chance to talk with her face to face, the two fall in love and he decides to quit the assassination job.

Bakka Reddy and his goons arrives in the city to hunt down Veera Shankar for running away from the marriage. He has the entrances and exits of the hotel closed off so he can search for Veera Shankar. Trapped inside Seetharam's hotel, Sairam reveals that he had a bomb planted there, but no-one believes him. Bakka Reddy's daughter falls in love with the hotel bellboy and convinces her father to forgive Veera Shankar.

Everyone is finally convinced that there is really a bomb, but Bakka Reddy loses the key to the locks he placed on the hotel doors. In a panic, everyone joins forces to search for the bomb and the key, but the bellboy reveals he returned the bomb (which he thought was a cake) to Sairam's hotel as the box it was in had his hotel's name on it. From the safety of Seetharam's hotel, they see Sairam's hotel, luckily empty of guests, explode. Sairam is devastated by the turn of events, but the rest of the guests are pleased with their enmities laid to rest and their new relationships in front of them.

== Cast ==
- Aryan Rajesh as Veera Shankar
- Deepika as Arti
- Chalapathi Rao as Sairam, a hotel owner in Bangkok
- Brahmanandam Shankar Dada RMP
- Dharmavarapu Subramanyam as Thuppu Apparao
- Kondavalasa as Bakka Reddy
- Jaya Prakash Reddy as Banda Reddy
- Ali as Alankar DSP
- Babu Mohan as Seetharam, Hotel Owner at Bangkok
- Lakshmipati as Kasi, Shankar Dada's assistant
- Krishna Bhagavan as Gowri Shankar, Kadapa Reddemma's husband
- Mallikarjuna Rao as Murthy
- L.B. Sriram as chain smoker Gangadharam, Leela Rani's husband
- Kovai Sarala as Leela Rani, Gangadharam's wife
- Telangana Shakuntala as Kadapa Reddamma, Gowri Shankar's wife
- Jeeva as Pataas Padmanabham
- Babloo as Hotel Bellboy
- Bangkok Bobby as Room Service staff
- Jyothi as Kattiribatta Kameshwari, Thuppu Apparao's wife
- Geetha Singh as Bakka Reddy's daughter
- Abhinayashree (cameo appearance)
- Jayalalita (cameo appearance)

== Soundtrack ==
The soundtrack was composed by Kamalakar. The audio release function took place on 9 January 2005 with Y. S. Rajasekhara Reddy, Lagadapati Rajagopal, and D. Ramanaidu as the chief guests.

Track listing
| No. | Title | Lyrics | Singer(s) | Length |
|---|---|---|---|---|
| 1. | "Thaka Thaka Thayya" | Varikuppala Yadagiri | Karthik, Usha | 4:02 |
| 2. | "Banthi Lanti Bhama" | Surendra Krishna | Tippu, Shalini | 4:46 |
| 3. | "Kala Kadhuga Cheliya" | Bandaru Danaiah Kavi | Karthik, Sadhana Sargam | 4:18 |
| 4. | "Varewa Emi Figaru" | Surendra Krishna | Mano, Ramu, Sagar, Sumangali, Prasanna, Veenapani | 11:35 |
| 5. | "Ammo Vadevadogaani" | Srihari Jagannadh | Malgudi Subha, Malathi, Tippu | 5:05 |
| 6. | "Bangakhatham" | Surendra Krishna | KK | 4:07 |
| Total length: | | | | 33:53 |

== Reception ==
Sify wrote "EVV Satyanarayan, the veteran director is back with another comedy that fails to impress the audience. His son Aryan Rajesh plays the lead with a battalion of comedians but sadly none of them is able to evoke any laughter". Jeevi of Idlebrain.com rated the film 2.5 out of 5 stars and wrote, "The main drawbacks of the film are lack of story and half-baked script. There are no emotions as well".

== Box office ==
The film ran for 50 days in 26 centers. The 50 days function took place at Sudarshan 70mm in Hyderabad on 13 March 2005. Special guests were Lagadapati Rajagopal and D. Ramanaidu.

The film ran for 100 days in 21 centers. The 100 days function took place Siddardha College Ground on 30 April 2005. Dasari Narayana Rao, Lagadapati Rajagopal, and Sindhura Gadde attended the event as special guests.

The film ran for 175 days. The 175 days function took place at Shilpa Kala Vedika, Hyderabad on 16 July 2005. D. Ramanaidu and D. V. Narasa Raju graced the event as special guests.
