= Nireekshana (2005 film) =

- DVD Cover
- Directed by: N. Seetaram
- Written by: N. Seetaram
- Produced by: D. Ramanaidu
- Starring: Aryan Rajesh; Sridevi
- Cinematography: Sarath
- Edited by: K. V. Krishna Reddy
- Music by: M. M. Srilekha
- Production company: Sri Suresh Productions
- Release date: 1 July 2005
- Country: India
- Language: Telugu
- Budget: ₹1.25 crore

Nireekshana is a 2005 Indian Telugu-language action drama film directed by N Seetaram and starring Aryan Rajesh and Sridevi.

== Plot ==
The film follows a man (Ravindra) who is in desperate need in money and happens to see a woman (Anu). Later, he learns that the woman is worth a large sum of money and is locked up in a farmhouse. How he saves her forms the rest of the story.

== Cast ==
- Aryan Rajesh as Ravindra
- Sridevi as Anu
- Nagendra Babu
- Rama Prabha
- M. S. Narayana
- Tanikella Bharani
- Dharmavarapu Subramanyam
- Satyam Rajesh as Ravindra's friend
- Ali
- Banerjee
- Surya
- Gundu Hanumantha Rao
- Gautham Raju
- Siva Reddy
- Jyothy
- Anant
- Bandla Ganesh
- Rambabu
- Ravi Varma
- Narsing Yadav
- Kalpana
- Archana Rai
- Babu Mohan

== Production ==
The shooting for the film began on 16 March 2005 and as of May 2005, the talkie portion of the film was completed. A few songs were shot in Kuala Lumpur.

== Soundtrack ==
The music was composed by M. M. Srilekha. The audio release function was held on 9 June 2005 with K. Raghavendra Rao, G Adiseshagiri Rao, M. S. Raju, Paruchuri Venkateswara Rao and D Suresh Babu attending as guests.

== Reception ==
Jeevi of Idlebrain.com wrote that "Nireekshana - D Rama Naidu's film after a long gap - disappoints". B. Anuradha of Rediff.com opined that "Nireekshana is definitely a film to avoid". A critic from Sify stated that "Nireekshana is one of those films you wished you never saw!" Himabindu Chatta of Full Hyderabad said that "The movie is a remix of an assortment of older, better films, but even the flimsy cut-and-paste-job could have been much more refined".
