= Aryan Rajesh =

Indian actor

- Born: Edara Aryan Rajesh; Hyderabad, Telangana, India
- Occupations: Actor; Film producer
- Years active: 2002–present
- Organization: E. V .V. Cinema
- Spouse: Subhashini (m. 2012)
- Children: 2
- Parents: E. V. V. Satyanarayana (father); Saraswati Kumari (mother)
- Relatives: Allari Naresh (Younger Brother)

Edara Aryan Rajesh is an Indian actor and film producer who appears predominantly in Telugu films. He is the elder son of veteran director and producer E. V. V. Satyanarayana.

He produces films along with his younger brother Allari Naresh under their production company, E. V .V. Cinema.

== Personal life ==
Aryan Rajesh was born to Telugu veteran director and producer E V V Satyanarayana and Saraswati. He has a younger brother Allari Naresh who is also an actor in Telugu cinema. On 14 February 2012, he married Subhashini, daughter of contractor Kantipudi Amarnath and has one son & daughter.

== Career ==
His career started with the movie Hai in 2002, which was directed by his father E. V. V. Satyanarayana. The same year he debuted in Tamil in Vasanthabalan's directorial debut Album, alongside Shrutika. Rajesh acted in Leela Mahal Center (2004) and his father's Evadi Gola Vaadidhi (2005); both were successful. He acted with his brother Allari Naresh in Nuvvante Naakishtam (2005), which was also directed by his father. Rajesh acted in the thriller film Anumanaspadam (2007), which received positive reviews. After that he was seen in Cheran's Pokkisham (2009) in a small role. In 2014, he returned to Tamil with a film titled Eera Veyyil. He became producer with his brother's Bandipotu (2015). He played a small role in Vinaya Vidheya Rama (2019).

== Filmography ==
=== Films ===
As actor

Year	Title	Role	Language	Notes
2002	Hai	Aryan Rajesh	Telugu	
2002	Sontham	Vamsikrishna	Telugu	
2002	Album	Jeeva	Tamil	Credited as Rajesh
2003	Aadanthe Ado Type	Surya	Telugu	
2003	Sambhu	Sambhu	Telugu	
2004	Leela Mahal Center	Prabhu	Telugu	
2005	Evadi Gola Vaadidhi	Veera Sankar	Telugu	
2005	Nireekshana	Ravindra	Telugu	
2005	Nuvvante Naakishtam	Yuvaraj	Telugu	
2007	Anumanaspadam	Bhavaraju Suryanarayana / Bhasu	Telugu	
2009	Romeo		Telugu	
2009	Pokkisham	Mahesh	Tamil	
2010	Buridi		Telugu	
2012	Balaraju Aadi Bamardi	Vijay	Telugu	
2014	Eera Veyyil	Bala	Tamil	
2015	Bandipotu	Businessman	Telugu	Cameo and also producer
2019	Vinaya Vidheya Rama	Sekhar	Telugu	
2023	Spy	Subhash Vardhan	Telugu	

As producer

- Bandipotu (2015)

== Web series ==
Year	Title	Role	Platform	Notes
2019	Ekkadiki Ee Parugu	Investigating Officer	ZEE5	Season 1&2
2022	Hello World	Raghav	ZEE5	
