= E. V. V. Satyanarayana =

Indian film director (1956–2011)

E.V V Satyanarayana
- Born: Edara Veera Venkata Satyanarayana; 10 June 1956; Korumamidi, Andhra State, India
- Died: 21 January 2011 (aged 54); Hyderabad, Telangana, India
- Occupations: Film director; producer; Screenwriter
- Years active: 1982 - 2011
- Spouse: Saraswathi (Sarru)
- Children: Aryan Rajesh; Allari Naresh

Edara Veera Venkata Satyanarayana (born 10 June 1956 – 21 January 2011) was an Indian film director, screenwriter and producer. He directed a total of 51 films and introduced many actors to Telugu cinema. He was well known for making comedy and melodrama films. In 2000, he established his own production company, E. V. V. Cinema. He died in 2011.

== Biography ==
=== Early life ===
E.V V Satyanarayana, was born on 10 June 1956 in Korumamidi village of West Godavari district in present-day Andhra Pradesh, India. His parents were Venkataratnam and Venkatrao.

=== Film career ===
E. V. V. faced many hardships during his early days in Chennai. His passion for films, relentless approach, persistence, and determination to make it big in the industry attracted the attention of noted producer Navatha Krishnam Raju, with whose help he joined Devadas Kanakala as an assistant director for the film O Inti Bhagavatam. Later, he worked under director Jandhyala for about 8 years and made 22 films like Nalugu Stambhalata (1982), Rendu Jella Seetha (1983), Nelavanka (1983), Rendu Rella Aaru (1985), Aha Naa Pellanta (1987) and Hai Hai Nayaka (1989). He also worked as co-director for the movie Indrudu Chandrudu.

Satyanarayana's directorial debut, Chevilo Puvvu, was a major flop. He was so depressed that he contemplated leaving the film industry. His destiny changed when producer D. Ramanaidu gave him a chance to direct Prema Khaidi, which screened successfully in all centers. He followed the path of his teacher, Jandhyala, and made successful comedy movies. His first movie in the comedy genre was Appula Appa Rao, followed by Aa Okkati Adakku and Jamba Lakidi Pamba. He also directed family sentiment films, most prominent among them the 1994 super hit film Aame, starring Srikanth and Ooha. He also directed movies like Hello Brother, Alluda Majaka, Intlo Illalu Vantintlo Priyuralu, Goppinti Alludu, and Varasudu, and the Hindi movie Sooryavansham, which starred Amitabh Bachchan and Soundarya. He also directed critically acclaimed movies like Thaali, Kanyadanam and Ammo! Okato Tareekhu.

=== Death ===
E. V. V. Satyanarayana died on 21 January 2011, following multiple complications from chemotherapy for throat cancer, which led to sepsis and cardiac arrest.

=== Awards ===
Satyanarayana was presented a Nandi Award in 1994 for the film Aame.

== Filmography ==
- All films are in Telugu, unless otherwise noted.

Year	Title	Director	Writer	Producer	Notes
1982	Nalugu Stambhalata	Associate	No	No	
1983	Rendu Jella Seetha	Assistant	No	No	
1986	Rendu Rella Aaru	Assistant	No	No	
1986	Seetharama Kalyanam	No	No	No	As an actor
1987	Aha Naa Pellanta	Associate	No	No	
1989	Hai Hai Nayaka	Associate	No	No	
1989	Indrudu Chandrudu	Associate	No	No	Also actor
1990	Chevilo Puvvu	Yes	Screenplay	No	
1990	Prema Khaidi	Yes	Screenplay	No	
1992	Seetharatnam Gari Abbayi	Yes	Screenplay	No	
1992	Appula Appa Rao	Yes	Yes	No	
1992	Aa Okkati Adakku	Yes	Screenplay	No	
1992	420	Yes	Yes	No	
1993	Varasudu	Yes	Screenplay	No	Remake of Hindi film Phool Aur Kaante
1993	Evandi Aavida Vachindi	Yes	Screenplay	No	
1993	Alibaba Ara Dozen Dongalu	Yes	Yes	No	
1993	Abbaigaru	Yes	Screenplay	No	Remake of Tamil film Enga Chinna Rasa
1993	Jamba Lakidi Pamba	Yes	Yes	No	
1994	Hello Brother	Yes	Yes	No	Inspired from Twin Dragons
1994	Aame	Yes	Yes	No	
1995	Aayanaki Iddaru	Yes	Screenplay	No	Remake of Hindi film Aaina
1995	Maga Rayudu	Yes	Screenplay	No	
1995	Alluda Majaka	Yes	No	No	
1996	Telugu Veera Levara	Yes	Screenplay	No	
1996	Intlo Illalu Vantintlo Priyuralu	Yes	Screenplay	No	Remake of Tamil film Thaikulame Thaikulame
1996	Adirindi Alludu	Yes	Screenplay	No	Remake of Tamil film Idhu Namma Aalu
1996	Akkada Ammayi Ikkada Abbayi	Yes	Screenplay	No	Remake of Hindi film Qayamat Se Qayamat Tak
1997	Chilakkottudu	Yes	Screenplay	No	Remake of Malayalam film Boeing Boeing
1997	Thaali	Yes	Screenplay	No	
1997	Vedevadandi Babu	Yes	Screenplay	No	Remake of Tamil film Ullathai Allitha
1997	Maa Nannaki Pelli	Yes	Screen adaptation	No	
1997	Nenu Premisthunnanu	Yes	Screenplay	No	Remake of Malayalam film Aniyathipraavu
1998	Maavidaakulu	Yes	Yes	No	
1998	Aavida Maa Aavide	Yes	Screenplay	No	
1998	Kanyadanam	Yes	Screenplay	No	
1999	Neti Gandhi	Yes	Screenplay	No	
1999	Sooryavansham	Yes	Screenplay	No	Hindi film Remake of Tamil film Suryavamsam
1999	Pilla Nachindi	Yes	Screenplay	No	
2000	Chala Bagundi	Yes	Yes	Yes	
2000	Goppinti Alludu	Yes	Screenplay	No	Remake of Hindi film Hero No. 1
2000	Ammo! Okato Tareekhu	Yes	Yes	No	
2001	Maa Aavida Meeda Ottu Mee Aavida Chala Manchidi	Yes	Yes	Yes	
2001	Veedekkadi Mogudandi?	Yes	Screenplay	No	
2001	Thank You Subba Rao	Yes	Screenplay	No	
2002	Hai	Yes	Yes	No	
2002	Thotti Gang	Yes	Yes	Yes	Based on Saving Silverman
2003	Aadanthe Ado Type	Yes	Screenplay	No	Remake of Tamil film Mounam Pesiyadhe
2003	Maa Alludu Very Good	Yes	Yes	No	
2004	Aaruguru Pativratalu	Yes	Yes	Yes	
2005	Evadi Gola Vaadidhi	Yes	Screenplay	No	
2005	Nuvvante Naakishtam	Yes	Yes	Yes	
2006	Kithakithalu	Yes	Yes	Yes	
2007	Athili Sattibabu LKG	Yes	Yes	Yes	
2007	Pellaindi Kaani	Yes	Screenplay	No	
2009	Bendu Apparao RMP	Yes	Screenplay	No	
2009	Fitting Master	Yes	Yes	Yes	
2010	Buridi	Yes	Screenplay	No	
2010	Kathi Kantha Rao	Yes	Screenplay	No	
