= Suhasini (Telugu actress) =

Indian actress

- Born: Nellore District, Andhra Pradesh, India
- Other name: Suha
- Occupations: Actress, television producer
- Years active: 2003–present
- Spouse: Dharma (m. 2016)

Suhasini is an Indian actress, who has predominantly appeared in Telugu films.

== Career ==
Suhasini hails from Nellore district in Andhra Pradesh, India. Her acting debut was B. Jaya's Chantigadu after which she went on to act in four Tamil films. In her first Tamil film, the horror flick Adhu, she played a ghost, and The Hindu's critic noted that she was "quite expressive". She later acted in Rama Narayanan's Mannin Maindhan, a remake of the Telugu film Yagnam. About Suha's performance in the film, The Hindu wrote: "Suha is beautiful and charming in the song sequences and has also tried her best to emote". She was also cast as the female lead in Unnai Enakku Pidichirukku, that featured comedian Senthil's son Naveen in his debut. All her Tamil projects were unsuccessful.

She then returned to Telugu cinema and in the following years, she either starred in low-profile films—such as Sundaraniki Tondarekkuva, which saw her reuniting with her Chantigadu co-star Baladitya, Guna, Prema Charitra, Highway and Sandadi — or appeared in supporting roles in projects like Kokila, Bhookailas, Lakshmi Kalyanam, Pandurangadu and Punnami Naagu. In between, she had another Tamil release Gnabagam Varuthe, co-starring Venkat Prabhu and S. P. B. Charan, and also made her Kannada debut in Baa Bega Chandamama.

In 2010, she ventured into television, playing the lead role in the Telugu serial Aparanji. The series completed over 300 episodes, which led to her landing further lead roles in Anubandalu (replacing Meena) and Ashta Chamma, besides earning her the 2011 AP Cinegoers' Award for Best Actress. She also acted in a Tamil TV series, Sivasankari. After her television debut, she enacted lead roles in Super Good Films' Tamil drama film Pillaiyar Theru Kadaisi Veedu and the Telugu devotional film Sri Vasavi Vaibhavam, and acted in two Bhojpuri films with Sudip Pandey.

In February 2015, her new TV Serial Iddaru-Ammayilu started on Zee Telugu.

== Filmography ==
| Year | Film | Role | Language | Notes |
|---|---|---|---|---|
| 2003 | Chantigadu | Sitamahalakshmi | Telugu | |
| 2004 | Adhu | Kayalvizhi | Tamil | Credited as Suha |
| 2005 | Mannin Maindhan | Amudha Bhairavamurthy | Tamil | Credited as Suha |
| 2006 | Sundaraniki Tondarekkuva | | Telugu | |
| 2006 | Kokila | Subbalakshmi | Telugu | |
| 2006 | Gana | Priya | Telugu | |
| 2007 | Aadivaram Adavallaku Selavu | | Telugu | |
| 2007 | Bhookailas | Bujji | Telugu | |
| 2007 | Lakshmi Kalyanam | Parijatham | Telugu | |
| 2007 | Gnabagam Varuthe | | Tamil | Credited as Suha |
| 2008 | Highway | Seetha | Telugu | |
| 2008 | Pandurangadu | Satyabhama | Telugu | |
| 2008 | Baa Bega Chandamama | Preethi | Kannada | |
| 2008 | Thamasha Chudham Randi | | Telugu | |
| 2009 | Sweet Heart | Lakshmi | Telugu | |
| 2009 | Punnami Naagu | Gangamma Lakshmi | Telugu | |
| 2010 | Sandadi | Suji | Telugu | |
| 2010 | Mouna Ragam | Kaveri | Telugu | |
| 2010 | Pournami Nagam | | Tamil | |
| 2011 | Prema Charitra | Anjali | Telugu | |
| 2011 | Pillaiyar Theru Kadaisi Veedu | Valli | Tamil | |
| 2011 | Sharabi | | Bhojpuri | |
| 2011 | Kurbaani | | Bhojpuri | |
| 2012 | Sri Vasavi Vaibhavam | Vasavi Kanyaka | Telugu | |
| 2013 | Adda | Pooja | Telugu | |
| 2014 | Rough | Chandu’s sister | Telugu | |
| 2016 | Spices of Liberty | Radha | English | |

== Television ==
| Year | TV Serial | Role | Language | Channel | Notes |
|---|---|---|---|---|---|
| 2012-2015 | Sivasankari | | Tamil | Sun TV | |
| 2011-2013 | Aparanji | Ganga | Telugu | Gemini TV | TV debut |
| 2013 | Anubhandalu | Sarada | Telugu | Gemini TV | replaced Meena |
| 2013-2015 | Asta Chamma | Jyothi | Telugu | MAA TV | |
| 2015-2017 | Iddaru Ammayilu | Aparna | Telugu | Zee Telugu | Also Producer |
| 2017-2019 | Naa Kodalu Bangaram | Siri | Telugu | Zee Telugu | Also Producer |
| 2020–2021 | Girija Kalyanam | Girija / Varna | Telugu | Gemini TV | Also Producer |
| 2020–2022 | Devatha - Anubandhala Alayam | Rukmini | Telugu | Star Maa | |
| 2023–2025 | Mamagaru | Ganga | Telugu | Star Maa | |
| 2025-present | Srihari Kalyanam | Producer | Telugu | Gemini TV | Producer |
