= Ramesh Balakrishnan =

Indian film director

- Other name: Ramesh Krishnan
- Occupation: Director
- Years active: 1994–present

Ramesh Balakrishnan is an Indian film director and television producer who has worked on Tamil films and serials.

== Career ==
Ramesh Balakrishnan graduated with an English literature degree, before going on to take a film making course at the Film and Television Institute of Chennai. He began his directorial career with the film Adharmam (1994) featuring Murali and Ranjitha in the lead roles, where cinematographer V. Manikandan also made his debut. His second film Pagaivan (1997) starring Ajith Kumar and Sathyaraj released three years later, with the makers experiencing delays after they fell out with the lead actress Anjala Zhaveri. He then went on to make the action drama Thadayam (1997), and took a break before making the horror film Adhu (2004), which starred Sneha in the lead role.

Moving away from feature films, he worked for UTV Mumbai and then helped launch the Mahabharatham television series on Sun TV. He then briefly headed UTV's Chennai office, before starting his own production house, Crank Mediaworks. The studio has since gone to make serials including Malli, Agni Paarvai featuring Simran and Vijay Chithiram.

== Filmography ==
=== As Director ===
Year	Film	Notes
1994	Adharmam	
1997	Pagaivan	
1997	Thadayam	
2004	Adhu	
TBA	Mayavalai	
