= B. Jaya =

B. Jaya may refer to:

- B. Jaya (actress) (1944–2021), Indian actress in Kannada cinema
- B. Jaya (director) (1964–2018), Indian director in Telugu cinema
