= Premikulu =

- Official poster
- Directed by: B. Jaya
- Written by: B. Jaya; Ganesh Ravuri; Veligonda Srinivas (dialogues)
- Produced by: BA Raju
- Starring: Yuvaraj; Kamna Jethmalani
- Cinematography: Vijaya Sri
- Music by: Sajan
- Release date: 4 August 2005
- Country: India
- Language: Telugu

Premikulu (transl. Lovers) is a 2005 Indian Telugu-language romantic drama film directed by B. Jaya and starring Yuvaraj and Kamna Jethmalani.

== Plot ==
Chandu and Vennela fall in love against their parents' wishes, so they jump from the top of a building. They both lose their memory of each other. How they reunite forms the rest of the plot.

== Cast ==
- Yuvaraj as Chandu
- Kamna Jethmalani as Vennela
- Rishi Girish
- Rajiv Kanakala
- Abhinaya Krishna
- Phani
- Manu
- Sana
- Ahuti Prasad as Chandu's father
- Rambabu
- Brahmanandam
- Venu Madhav
- Lakshmipati
- Kallu Chidambaram
- Sai Suresh
- TP Gopal
- Viswanath Reddy
- Suribabu
- Sudhakar
- Rajyalakshmi
- Suma Kanakala
- Sheela Singh
- Abhinayashree (item number)

== Production ==
The film is produced by magazine editor BA Raju, who also produced the films Premalo Pavani Kalyan (2002) and Chantigadu (2003; also directed by Jaya). The film began production in January 2005. Newcomer Yuvaraj, a Telugu guy from Mumbai, and Kamna Jethmalani made their debut with this film. Kamna Jethmalani was cast in the film after director Jaya convinced Jethmalani's parents to let her star in the film. The music is composed by Raveendran's son, Sajan.

== Soundtrack ==
The music was composed by Sajan Madhav. The audio rights were bagged by Aditya Music.

== Reception ==
Jeevi of Idlebrain.com wrote that "On a whole, Premikulu - made with a novel point - does not live it up". A critic from Rediff.com wrote that "Despite choosing a plot with some potential (lovers failing to identify themselves due to amnesia), she [Jaya] is unable to hold an audience with interesting narration, relying on clichéd comedy instead". A critic from Full Hyderabad wrote that "Eminently worth a miss, and if it's the songs you want to watch it for, there are always the cassettes and CDs".
