= Mannin Maindhan =

- DVD cover
- Directed by: Rama Narayanan
- Screenplay by: M. Karunanidhi
- Based on: Yagnam (2004)
- Produced by: Rama Narayanan
- Starring: Sibiraj; Suha; Manoj K. Jayan; Ponnambalam; Vadivelu; Suman Setty
- Cinematography: N. K. Viswanathan
- Edited by: Raj Keerthy
- Music by: Bharadwaj
- Production company: Azhagar Films
- Release date: 4 March 2005
- Running time: 142 minutes
- Country: India
- Language: Tamil

Mannin Maindhan (transl. Son of the soil) is a 2005 Indian Tamil language action film, directed by Rama Narayanan, making it his 112th film as director. The film stars Sibiraj and Adhu fame Suha in lead roles with Sathyaraj in a special appearance. The film, a remake of the Telugu film Yagnam (2004), was released on 4 March 2005.

== Plot ==
Bhairavamurthy (Manoj K. Jayan) and Gajapathy (Ponnambalam) are two powerful landlords who fight against each other in their village. Bhairavamurthy's wife and car driver got killed by Gajapathy's henchmen in the past, then Kadhir (Sibiraj), the car driver's son, decided to take revenge on Gajapathy one day and grew up in Bhairavamurthy's house. Amutha (Suha), Bhairavamurthy's daughter, returns to her village after studying in the city college and then falls in love with Kadhir. Bhairavamurthy decides to join hands with Gajapathy and to kill his faithful henchman Kadhir. The couple elopes from the house and runs around the village. Pratap (Sathyaraj), an honest cop, saves them. The henchmen, who worked with the landlords, lay down their arms and support the couple. Bhairavamurthy and Gajapathy decide to both kill Kadhir, but they eventually kill each other.

== Cast ==
- Sibiraj as Kathir
- Suha as Amudha
- Manoj K. Jayan as Bhairavamurthy
- Ponnambalam as Gajapathy
- Alex as Kasi
- Vadivelu as 'Quarter' Vadivelu
- Suman Setty as Dheena
- Bala Singh as Joseph
- Indhu as Joseph's wife
- Kumarimuthu as Police Constable
- Thyagu as Police Constable
- Sathyaraj as Inspector Pratap (cameo appearance)
- Dharmavarapu Subramanyam as Raghavan (guest appearance)

== Soundtrack ==
The soundtrack was composed by Bharadwaj.

Song	Singer(s)	Lyrics	Duration
"Andravin Ponnu"	Mano, Reshmi	Snehan	4:04
"Idhu Ladies Hostel"	Jay Laxmi	Na. Muthukumar	4:41
"Kannin Manipola"	K. S. Chitra, Master Sathiya	Karunanidhi	3:41
"Kilakku Killakku"	Muralidharan	Vairamuthu	5:15
"Yeamma Yeamma"	Sujatha Mohan, Tippu	Vaali	4:22

== Reception ==
S. R. Ashok Kumar of The Hindu wrote that "Both Sathyaraj and Sibi have shown that they at home in both pathos and action sequences". M Bharat Kumar of News Today wrote "One steps out with a feel of having had a face-to-face with an old Mannin Maindhan, one not in tune with the latest trend in the film world". Cinesouth wrote "Rama Narayanan's courage is to be appreciated for making a film based on age-old village story, same kind of enmity between village big wigs, Panchyath under Banyan tree, etc., even in this modern world, in which even LKG children handle the computer with ease". Malini Mannath of Chennai Online wrote "It's an old story line, and those who've seen the director's earlier films will find his style repeated here too. He is not much bothered about setting pace with the changing trends and technology. Incidentally, this is his 112th directorial venture. There's nothing much to look forward to here!".
