= Pagaivan =

- Poster
- Directed by: Ramesh Balakrishnan
- Written by: Boopathy Pandian (dialogues)
- Story by: Viswaas Sundar
- Produced by: Viswaas Sundar
- Starring: Ajith Kumar; Sathyaraj; Anjala Zaveri
- Cinematography: D. Shankar
- Edited by: B. Lenin; V. T. Vijayan
- Music by: Deva
- Production company: Viswas Films
- Release date: 1 August 1997
- Running time: 142 minutes
- Country: India
- Language: Tamil

Pagaivan (transl. Nemesis) is a 1997 Indian Tamil-language action comedy film directed by Ramesh Balakrishnan, starring Ajith Kumar, Sathyaraj, and Anjala Zaveri, while Ranjitha, Nagesh, K. S. Ravikumar, and Vivek play supporting roles. The music was composed by Deva. The film revolves around a kidnapping undertaken by a man and the actions that the victim's father takes to save his daughter. The film released on 1 August 1997 to mixed reviews, but critics praised the comedy and performance of Sathyaraj. The film was a commercial failure.

== Plot ==
Prabhu, despite having all the required qualifications for the job he applied for, fails after he was demanded to pay a considerable amount as a caution deposit. Every time, his chances of getting the job were hanging on the payment of this caution.

Determined to get the job at all costs, Prabhu is ready to do anything to obtain this amount as quickly as possible. He decides to kidnap someone so as to demand a ransom from the family of this person. Fate leads him to abduct Uma, who happens to be the only daughter of Minister Durairaj.

Uma falls in love with Prabhu, and, before long, Prabhu begins to love Uma too. Meanwhile, Uma’s parents hire Vasu, a rowdy who is ready to do anything for the sake of money, to find their daughter. The rest of the film revolves around if the pair will be found.

== Cast ==
- Ajith Kumar as Prabhu
- Sathyaraj as Vasu
- Anjala Zaveri as Uma Durairaj
- Ranjitha as Esther
- Nagesh as Church Father
- K. S. Ravikumar as Minister Durairaj
- Mansoor Ali Khan as Dharman
- Vivek as Prabhu's friend
- Babu Antony as Dharman's brother
- Sumithra as Uma's mother
- Delhi Ganesh as Prabhu's father
- S. Lalitha as Prabhu's mother
- G. Venkateswaran as Padmanabhan, Medicine Company Owner
- Manobala as Govindhan
- Bayilvan Ranganathan as Durairaj's assistant
- Sempuli Jagan as Singam
- Ajay Rathnam as Police Inspector
- Balu Anand as Security Guard
- Soundar as Barman
- Mahanadi Shankar as Fighter
- Naga Kannan as Welding Kannan
- Vikram Singh as Singh
- Dhamu as Prabhu's friend
- Madhan Bob as Judge
- Ravi Raj as Lawyer
- Vellai Subbaiah as Kaliaperumal
- Priyanka as an Office Clerk

== Production ==
During the making of the film, the producers fell out with actress Anjala Zaveri, causing the film to be briefly delayed.

== Soundtrack ==
The soundtrack was composed by Deva, with lyrics written by Vairamuthu and Piraisoodan.

Track listing
No.	Title	Lyrics	Singer(s)	Length
1.	"Happy New Year"	Vairamuthu	Mano, Krishnaraj	5:23
2.	"Rajanea"	Vairamuthu	Anuradha Sriram, Arunmozhi	5:08
3.	"Anda Ka Kasam"	Vairamuthu	Mano	5:13
4.	"Oh My Butter Fly"	Piraisoodan	Gopal Rao, Sujatha	5:14
5.	"Poo Malai Podum"	Vairamuthu	Anuradha Sriram, Krishnaraj	5:23
6.	"Vaazhkai Enbadhu"	Vairamuthu	Malaysia Vasudevan	2:13
Total length:				28:34

== Reception ==
Ji of Kalki praised the acting of Sathyaraj and K. S. Ravikumar, he praised Deva's background score but panned his songs while also praising film's fast pace, fight choreography and camera angles.
