= Asuravamsam =

Asuravamsham
- Directed by: Shaji Kailas
- Written by: Ranjith
- Produced by: R. Mohan
- Starring: Manoj K. Jayan; Siddique; Biju Menon; Narendra Prasad; Sai Kumar
- Cinematography: V. Manikandan
- Edited by: L. Bhoominathan
- Music by: Rajamani
- Distributed by: Shogun Release
- Release date: 13 February 1997
- Country: India
- Language: Malayalam

Asuravamsam (transl. The Demon Lineage) is a 1997 Indian Malayalam-language action gangster drama film written by Ranjith and directed by Shaji Kailas, with cinematography by V. Manikandan. The film stars Manoj K. Jayan, Siddique, Biju Menon, Narendra Prasad, Sai Kumar, Priya Raman and Chippy.

== Plot ==
Palayam Murukan is an underworld gangster ruling Palayam market in Kozhikode, who hails from an aristocratic family, has a good academic background, but unknowingly gets into the crime world during his college days. He was expelled from his house by his sister after he was arrested for a murder. In alliance with Mayor Swamy and assisted by the muscle power of his trusted henchman Dosth Vishwan, Murukan becomes the most powerful person of the city. His activities include mediating land contracts, arranging hartals for political parties and murdering for a cause.

On the personal side, he enjoys a deep rooted friendship with Dosth, and also sponsors his adopted sister in her medical studies and is loved by the people of Palayam market. Things take a turn when Murukan clashes with Swamy over a land contract. Murukan backs Moosa Settu while Swamy supports the syndicate of Hussain Haji and Thattel brothers: Mani and Bobby. Mayor arranges the murder of Moosa Settu. Nandita Menon, a young industrialist also joins with them against Murukan, though she is unaware of their motive. The syndicate manages to bring a new city commissioner for the city to tackle Murukan.

Jayamohan, who is known for his aggressive and arrogant ways of tackling crime gets into a direct fight with Murukan, where he creates many problems in the Palayam market, and arrests everyone belonging to Murukan's gang, thus making Murukan try for violent retaliations, but Jayamohan, who discovers the soft side of Murukan, decides to turn him into a law-abiding citizen. Swamy and his group gets upset by this move. Nandita Menon also makes a truce with Murukan. Swami kills Dosth, which causes Murukan again to take the law into his hands, where he finishes the crime syndicate by killing Swamy, Hussein Haji and Bobby.

== Trivia ==
- This was the second script by Ranjith for Shaji Kailas after Rudraksham.
- This was also the first Malayalam film of cinematographer V. Manikandan.
- Kuthiravattam Pappu appears in a song.
- This film was shot in just 27 days at a budget of 78 lakhs and was completely shot in and around Kozhikode.

== Cast ==
- Manoj K. Jayan as Palayam Murukan
- Siddique as Dosth Viswanathan
- Biju Menon as Commissioner Jayamohan IPS
- Sai Kumar as Bobby
- Narendra Prasad as Mayor Swami
- Priya Raman as Nanditha Menon
- Chippy
- Rizabawa as Hussain Haji
- Ilavarasi as Gayathri
- C. I. Paul as Mani
- K. B. Ganesh Kumar
- Mamukkoya
- Augustine
- Maniyanpilla Raju as Circle Inspector
- Rajan P. Dev as Moosa Settu
- Madhupal as Moosa Settu's son
- Sadiq as Sub Inspector
- Ajith Kollam
- Bindu Panicker
- Kunjandi
- Valsala Menon
- Kozhikode Narayanan Nair
- Kollam Thulasi
- Lalithasree
