= Adharmam =

1994 film by Ramesh Balakrishnan

- Poster
- Directed by: Ramesh Balakrishnan
- Written by: Ramesh Krishnan; N. Chandra Mohan (dialogues)
- Produced by: G. Ramesh; G. Suresh; G. Satheesh
- Starring: Murali; Ranjitha; Nassar
- Cinematography: V. Manikandan
- Edited by: B. Ramesh
- Music by: Ilaiyaraaja
- Production company: G. K. Films International
- Release date: 14 April 1994
- Country: India
- Language: Tamil

Adharmam (/əðərməm/ transl. Unrighteousness) is a 1994 Indian Tamil-language action drama film directed by Ramesh Balakrishnan in his debut. The film stars Murali, Ranjitha and Nassar. It was released on 14 April 1994, Puthandu (Tamil New Year). V. Manikandan debuted as the cinematographer from this film.

== Cast ==
- Murali as Arjuna
- Ranjitha
- Nassar as Dharma
- Thalaivasal Vijay
- Vadivelu
- V. K. Dhivakaran as inspector
- Vijayakumar
- Thalapathi Dinesh
- Ajay Rathnam
- G. M. Sundar
- S. N. Lakshmi
- R. P. Viswam
- Janaki

== Music ==
The music was composed by Ilaiyaraaja, while the lyrics were written by Vaali and Ilaiyaraaja.

Song	Singers
"Dharmam Endru"	Ilaiyaraaja
"Muthu Mani"	S. P. Balasubrahmanyam, S. Janaki
"Nooru Vayasu"	Ilaiyaraaja
"Oru Pakkam Oru Nyaayam"	Ilaiyaraaja
"Inthiran Pole"	S. P. Balasubrahmanyam, S. Janaki
"Thendral Kaatre"	Mano
"Vambookara"	K. S. Chithra

== Critical reception ==
The Indian Express wrote, "Adharmam is a promising debut from Ramesh Krishnan. [..] His screenplay is clearly etched, and there is confidence and seriousness in his approach". Thulasi of Kalki wrote this film which deals with the subject of sandalwood abduction completely justifies it which makes us wonder whether Veerappan has financed this film. She also felt there were too many fights and most of them were plagiarised but praised the cinematography.
