= Ranam (2006 film) =

- Theatrical release poster
- Directed by: Amma Rajashekhar
- Written by: Marudhuri Raja (dialogues)
- Screenplay by: Amma Rajashekhar
- Story by: Amma Rajashekhar
- Produced by: Pokuri Babu Rao
- Starring: Gopichand; Kamna Jethmalani; Biju Menon
- Cinematography: Ch. Ramana Raju
- Edited by: Gautham Raju
- Music by: Mani Sharma
- Production company: Eetharam Films
- Release date: 10 February 2006
- Running time: 145 minutes
- Country: India
- Language: Telugu

Ranam (transl. War) is a 2006 Indian Telugu-language action comedy film produced by Pokuri Babu Rao on the Eetharam Films banner and directed by Amma Rajasekhar. It stars Gopichand, Kamna Jethmalani, and Biju Menon in the lead roles and features music composed by Mani Sharma. The film is the debut of Amma Rajasekhar as a director. The film was remade in Kannada as Bhadra (2011).

It was dubbed in Hindi as Surya Jalta Nahi Jalata Hai, in Tamil as Stalin, and in Oriya as Fighter. It was successful at the box office. The sequel named Ranam 2 was also planned where director Amma Rajasekhar marking his acting debut along with directing the film but after the death of actor Srihari the film got shelved and remained unreleased.

== Plot ==
Because of his antics tolerated by his father, Chinna moves to the city for higher studies, where he has an altercation with Bhagawati's gangsters. He finds himself in trouble when he falls in love with Maheswari, Bhagawati's sister.

== Cast ==
- Gopichand as Chinna
- Kamna Jethmalani as Maheswari / Mahi, Bhagawati's sister
- Biju Menon as Bhagawati
- Chandra Mohan as Chinna's father
- Ali as Gokul
- Rama Prabha as Mahi's grandmother
- Venu Madhav as Venu
- Suman Setty as Student
- Dharmavarapu Subramanyam as Principal
- Pruthvi Raj as Inspector
- Jeeva as Inspector
- G. V. Sudhakar Naidu as Masthan
- Vajja Venkata Giridhar as Student
- Amith as Student
- Venu Yeldandi as Bhagawati's henchmen
- Chandana Lakshmi Narasimha Rao (Chitti) as Chinna's brother
- Tarzan as Gowri
- Vijaya Singh as Chinna's mother
- Jahnavi as Mahi's friend

== Soundtrack ==
Ranam

Film score by Mani Sharma
- Released: 18 January 2006
- Recorded: 2005
- Genre: Soundtrack
- Length: 27:26
- Label: Aditya Music
- Producer: Mani Sharma

Mani Sharma chronology
Pandu (2005)	Ranam (2006)	Style (2006)

Music composed by Mani Sharma. The music was released by Aditya Music company. All tracks recorded, mixed and mastered by SV Ranjit.

No.	Title	Lyrics	Singer(s)	Length
1.	"Cheli Jabili"	Kandikonda	Naveen, Suchitra	4:35
2.	"Varevva"	Suddala Ashok Teja	Mallikarjun, Mahalakshmi Iyer	4:35
3.	"Hey Chinna"	Bhasha Sri	Tippu, Anuradha Sriram	4:04
4.	"Bulligownu"	Bhasha Sri	Jassie Gift	5:36
5.	"Nallanimabbu"	Bhasha Sri	Vardhini	4:38
6.	"Gana Gana"	Chandrabose	KK, Sangeetha	3:37
Total length:				27:26

== Reception ==
Jeevi of Idlebrain.com wrote that "On a whole, there are no boring moments in Ranam and you may watch it". Kishore of IANS wrote that "On the whole Ranam is an entertaining movie, worth watching once".

== Box office ==
The film had a 100-day run in 24 centres.
