= Sahasam (2013 film) =

- Theatrical release poster
- Directed by: Chandra Sekhar Yeleti
- Written by: Chandra Sekhar Yeleti
- Produced by: B. V. S. N. Prasad
- Starring: Gopichand; Taapsee Pannu; Shakti Kapoor
- Cinematography: Shamdat Sainudeen
- Edited by: Kotagiri Venkateswara Rao; Chandra Shekar G. V.
- Music by: Sri Kommineni
- Production company: Sri Venkateswara Cine Chitra
- Distributed by: BlueSky Cinemas (overseas)
- Release date: 12 July 2013 (India)
- Running time: 160 minutes
- Country: India
- Language: Telugu
- Budget: ₹30 crores
- Box office: est.₹ ₹13.5 crores distributors' share

Sahasam (transl. Adventure) is a 2013 Indian Telugu-language action-adventure film directed by Chandra Sekhar Yeleti and produced by B. V. S. N. Prasad under Sri Venkateswara Cine Chitra. The film stars Gopichand and Taapsee Pannu while Shakti Kapoor, Paru Gambhir, and Ali play supporting roles. The film was mostly shot in Ladakh and Hyderabad.

The film was released on 12 July 2013 and received positive reviews from critics. It was a successful venture for its producers but a small loss venture for its distributors, collecting a distributor's share of ₹13.5 crore at the box office. The film was also dubbed later in Tamil and Hindi as Santharppavaathi and The Real Jackpot. Over time, the film gained a cult following for its unique narrative, technical finesse and cast performance.

== Plot ==
2003: A Pakistani archaeologist, Dr. M. Alam Siddiqui, after seeking permission from the Government of Pakistan, starts researching the hidden treasure of King Kanishka, whose treasure map is hidden in an old box whose key is a Garuda locket, which was last seen in the research books of David, a British archaeologist. His team, led by Siddiqui and Dilawar, searches hard for the key as they find the box in an old market in Pakistan. Fate takes a reverse turn as a dreaded terrorist named Sultan, along with his men, visits the archaeology department. Sultan coerces Siddiqui, takes the box away from him, and makes all the people his slaves until Siddiqui finds the treasure and hands it over to Sultan.

2013: In Hyderabad, Gautham Kumar Varma is a brave, money-greedy security guard who wants to make easy money and settle in life. His motto is that he would not take even a crore if it is not his, but would never let go of even a penny if it is his. Gautham spends his time testing his fortune by buying lottery tickets and using gadgets that bring luck, but sadly, both schemes are unsuccessful. His friends, who are four kids, live with him in the slum colony. Once they ask him to show a 1000 rupee note out of curiosity, to which Gautham agrees. The next day, the ATM's cash cartridge is being refilled, and Gautham asks the officials to show the kids a 1000-rupee note. They accept and show a note.

Meanwhile, a gang of thieves comes and robs the ATM. Gautham catches the criminals and hands over the money, but since the CCTV footage shows that Gautham's request was the reason for it, he is posted to a dumping yard, where he works for nearly 12 hours. The night when Gautham returns from his duty, heavy rain drenches the colony, and the roof of his room falls. From the roof, he finds a diary, an old empty bag printed "Pushkalavathi Jewelers, Peshawar", a Garuda locket, two magnifying lenses, and a small stone with a design. He opens the diary and starts reading, narrated by his grandfather Satyanarayana Varma. On the day of the India-Pakistan partition, activists were attacking rich men and robbing them.

After finding no place to hide, Satyanarayana Varma packs all his jewelry and diamonds and rushes to a cave rumored to be a king's escape runway. After reaching the spot, he rests somewhere, keeping his bag on the door of an inlet. A bag of diamonds falls into one of the birds attached, thus opening the inlet and making the bags enter the inner space. He tries hard to get it back, but removes the bird from there. He falls into an abyss but survives. There was a promissory note that 900 diamonds of his would be inherited by his grandson. Gautham sets out to Pakistan with the help of Sreenidhi, an ardent Hindu devotee who wishes to visit the Hinglaj Mata temple in Pakistan.

There, Gautham and Sreenidhi, along with Indian security contractor Khayamat Raju, reach the Hinglaj Mata Temple. There, Gautham finds his grandfather's name on a slab, and two dwellers inform him that archaeologists searched for this person. He goes to the archaeology department, where Thilavar is now in charge after the brutal murder of Siddiqui, shows the empty bag to them, and finds that the address would be in Peshawar. Meanwhile, Gautham sees the Garuda locket sketch on the research papers and shows them the locket. Thilavar offers him money, gold, and many things in return for the locket as per Sultan's orders. Gautham neither accepts taking any one nor all of them nor accepts giving away the locket, contrary to his motto. He escapes from them and, along with Sreenidhi and Khayamat Raju, goes away to a safe place.

Meanwhile, Sreenidhi is made prey to a Buzkashi game with a rule that the one who parks her in the goal would marry her. A masked Gautham joins them, and after stiff competition, he wins the match by parking her, thus making her fall for him. They move to Peshawar to a local hospital, where they join Khayamat Raju with fake injuries and rest there that night. The next morning, Gautham starts searching in the streets of Peshawar Markets for his grandfather's address, only to be kidnapped by terrorists. Then he is brought before Sultan, who asks Gautham to submit the Garuda locket. Gautham says that he would not give it to Sultan or anyone, as it is his. They torture him, trash him, and injure him severely, only to make him much more determined not to give it to Sultan.

Sultan orders Thilavar and his men to take him away to Peshawar and kill him. In transit, Gautham kills most of them, leaving Thilavar and three others, and escapes to Peshawar in a bus. He reaches the hospital, where he learns from Khayamat Raju that a girl kidnapped Sreenidhi and gave her an address to meet her. He goes to the address and frees Sreenidhi. He then ties up the kidnapper with a rope, only to learn that she is Siddiqui's daughter Zara, whose ambition is to hand over the treasure of Kanishka to the Pakistan Government as per her father's wish. Now, Gautham, Zara, and Sreenidhi learn that the box containing the map is in Sultan's house, where Gautham goes with Zara. There, Gautham breaks the power supply, kills a Jihadi, wears his dress, and finds the box.

However, the power is on now, and Thilavar takes Gautham to the living room, where Sultan and his men are waiting. They dress him with a bomb with a piston to activate it. They remove his mask and find out that it was Gautham, only to be threatened by him to leave him or else all would be destroyed along with the box. He reaches out, ties the piston with a wire, carefully removes the bomb from his back with the help of Zara, and both escape from there with the box. They use the Garuda locket and take the map, which indicates a place near Hinglaj Mata Temple. The trio reaches there, and according to the map, there were five wheels to be arranged in a particular order. After arranging them correctly, the water in the well goes down through a spiral staircase, leading to a huge old door.

Sultan arrives at the spot, and to save themselves, Gautham throws the map into the abyss, thus making the trio the only source to reach the place. Gautham removes a metal flower from one of the wheels, and all go into the door, with some of them dying to fall into the abyss. They reach an old bridge which starts breaking while all are in a midway. The bridge breaks into nearly two parts, one on which the terrorists are, one on which Gautham is, and the last on which Zara, Sreenidhi, and Sultan are. To sustain on the bridge, Sultan kicks Zara into the abyss with the flow of water, and she is pronounced dead. Gautham connects the two bridges with the help of a rope, and all of them, including Sreenidhi and Sultan, enter the next phase. The next phase is the way to the inlet where the bird used to be.

Using two metal flower arrangements, a way is made due to the movements of levers and wheels, and all go to the inlet. Gautham keeps the bird there, and a circular door with a small hole appears. The metal flower of the previous wheel is arranged there as a key, and all of the people enter the next phase: walking through a deep tunnel behind the circular door. They enter another room with a drum surrounded by nearly hundreds of metal chains, surrounded by a circular curtain with sharp metal weapons, and they start rotating around as they are sound-sensitive. Gautham, after severe struggles, enters the middle chain and removes the trident lock, making a metal ball fall on the drum. Due to opposite vibrations, the chains restore their position. They enter the last phase by a circular staircase.

Gautham, Sreenidhi, Sultan, Thilavar, and some terrorists enter a room. The tiles are arranged with a land mine system where some creatures are painted. If one stood in the wrong place, then they would be killed by the sharp arrows projected from the mouths of sculptures on both walls. Gautham arranges the trident on a platform, due to which the land mine system is deactivated, and the mouths of the sculptures are sealed by metal plates. Everyone goes toward the room, and a fight starts between the terrorists and Gautham. While most of the terrorists die, one accidentally kicks the trident, once again reverting the changes. Thilavar and Gautham are on the sculptures, and at the right time, Gautham attacks Thilavar with war equipment, thus deterring him from the place and resulting in his death due to the arrows.

Gautham then risks reaching Sultan, who threatens to kill Sreenidhi and attacks him. By the time Sultan raises a sword at Gautham, Zara shoots Sultan with a gun and rearranges the trident. She later tells them that she fell into a place where there were no rocks and reached the other shore of the flow and reached the chamber through another stairway. The trio rejoices as they see the treasure in front of them. Gautham becomes the proud owner of 900 diamonds of his grandfather, and Zara fulfills Siddiqui's last wish by handing over the entire wealth to the Pakistan Government after Gautham refuses to take any single coin of it, as it belongs not to him, but to the Government of Pakistan.

== Cast ==
- Gopichand as Gautham Kumar Varma
- Taapsee Pannu as Sreenidhi
- Shakti Kapoor as Sultan
- Suman as Satyanarayana Varma
- Paru Gambhir as Zara
- Raj Singh Arora as Dilawar
- Ali as Khayamat Raju
- Vasu Inturi as Gautham's friend
- Surya as Sreenidhi's father
- Narayana Murthy as Narendra Varma, Gautham's father
- Sandhya Janak as Sreenidhi's mother

== Production ==
The film marks the second collaboration of Gopichand and Yeleti after Okkadunnadu. Taapsee Pannu is cast in a lead role. The film was known under the working title Jackpot but was later renamed as Sahasam. The film's first look was released on the eve of Ugadi in 2013.

== Soundtrack ==
Sahasam

Soundtrack album by Sri
- Released: 2 June 2013
- Recorded: 2013
- Genre: Feature film soundtrack
- Length: 22:33
- Language: Telugu
- Label: T-Series
- Producer: Sri

Sri chronology
Kaasi (2004)	Sahasam (2013)	Aadu Magaadra Bujji (2013)

The music composed by Sri, and lyrics were penned by Anantha Sreeram. The audio rights were secured by T-Series for ₹ 2 million. The audio was launched on 2 June 2013.

Track list
No.	Title	Artist(s)	Length
1.	"Dola Dola (Version 1)"	Ranjith, Sharmila	04:44
2.	"O Kanu Paapaa"	Karunya	05:22
3.	"Nenu Nenugaa"	Ranjith, Priya Himesh	05:11
4.	"Sahasam"	Devan Ekambaram	02:07
5.	"Dola Dola (Version 2)"	Ranjith, Geetha Madhuri	05:07
Total length:			22:33

=== Reception ===
The Times of India wrote, "In a time where the beat comes over everything else in Telugu cinema music, the album of Sahasam will come as a surprise. This album is all about rhythm and melody and the lyrics are all in Telugu as well. The music director Sri has given a very classic feel to the whole record" and rated the album 3/5. Cinecorn.com wrote, "Sri delivers and delivers well even after such a long gap. Wish he composed more often" and rated the album 3.25/5. Musicperk.com wrote Sahasam is not really a commercial album but it definitely suits the film's genre. It has got the potential to go on to become a chartbuster, but the usual veteran composition might not work out in the modern-day music. Few listens may definitely pop you out of the mood" and rated it 6/10.

== Release ==
The film released worldwide on 12 July 2013, after being postponed several times, by Bluesky Cinemas to the entire Overseas and Reliance Entertainment in India, with a U/A Certificate from Central Board of Film Certification. The film received positive reviews from the critics from the day of release and was declared as a Super Hit at the box office as well as in Gopichand's career. The film was later dubbed and released in Hindi as The Real Jackpot in 2014.

== Reception ==
The Times of India gave a review stating "Chandrasekhar Yeleti needs to be applauded for his tryst of an adventurous film – something that's unique in Telugu films." Idlebrain.com gave a review of rating 4/5 stating "I am giving it a rating of 4 for the guts of producers who came forward to make a different film and for the conviction of director to stick to the core subject and for not deviating from it for the sake of commercial elements" 123telugu.com gave a review of rating 3.25/5. stating "Sahasam is not your average Telugu cinema. The plot, the setting and the execution are very fresh and novel. You can safely watch Sahasam for some desi Indiana Jones moments."

Oneindia gave a review of rating 3/5 stating "Sahasam is a unique entertainer in Telugu, which is a right blend of brilliant performances and rich production values. The movie will impress all classes of audiences except glamour and comedy lovers. Watch the movie for its technical brilliance." APHerald.com gave a review of rating 3/5 stating "Firstly we must appreciate director Chandra Sekhar Yeleti and Gopi bringing an adventurous film to Telugu audience after a long time. And should applaud for trying a non-commercial film beveling in the content during the time where commercial films ruling the industry. If you go without any expectation, Sahasam will surprise you and impressive without the doubt."

SuperGoodMovies gave a review of rating 5/5 stating "Gopichand’s Sahasam is a beautiful movie. Everyone must watch this movie. This is definitely a worthy watch for this rainy weekend."
