= Pakka Commercial =

2022 film by Maruthi

- Theatrical release poster
- Directed by: Maruthi
- Written by: Maruthi
- Produced by: V. Vamsi Krishna Reddy; Pramod Uppalapati; Bunny Vas
- Starring: Gopichand; Raashii Khanna
- Cinematography: Karm Chawla
- Edited by: S. B. Uddhav
- Music by: Jakes Bejoy
- Production companies: UV Creations; GA2 Pictures
- Release date: 1 July 2022
- Running time: 152 minutes
- Country: India
- Language: Telugu
- Budget: ₹15 crore
- Box office: est. ₹15.30 crore

Pakka Commercial (transl. Purely commercial) is a 2022 Indian Telugu-language courtroom action comedy film written and directed by Maruthi and produced by UV Creations and GA2 Pictures. The film stars Gopichand and Raashii Khanna. It was released on 1 July 2022, and received mixed reviews from critics and audience. Following its acquisition by Aha, Pakka Commercial premiered on 4 August 2022.

== Plot ==
Suryanarayana is a dutiful judge, who resigns after being unable to deliver justice to Amulya, who was threatened and blackmailed by a rich man named Vivek and ultimately committed suicide. While he works hard at his shop to provide for his family, his son Ramachandra "Lucky" finds his law books and coat, sparking an inspiration to become a lawyer. Years later, Lucky becomes an advocate, who embodies the opposite principles of his father, settling cases outside of the court for his personal profits, which Suryanarayana is unaware. One day, Sirisha "Jhansi", an actress whose character, a lawyer in a serial, was kicked off to save money, requests Lucky so that she can sue the studio. Although their case is rejected, Lucky is impressed by Jhansi's knowledge and qualifications in real-life law and they fall in love with each other.

Afterwards, Lucky defends a gangster, who killed a lawyer despite extensive evidence against him, while Suryanayarana helps a couple file a case against a corrupt developer and politician, who is actually Vivek. When Suryanarayana refers the case to him, he instead meets Vivek and agrees to work with him for substantial rewards. Vivek also kidnaps the husband, who exposed his corruption. On the second hearing for the gangster's murder case, Jhansi, who has gotten closer to the family, unexpectedly brings Suryanarayana to the courtroom, forcing Lucky to honestly argue and leading to a guilty verdict for the gangster. Watching through a secret camera, Vivek is impressed by his performances and reaches the court. Vivek's arrival brings all the truths to light, and Suryanaryana is ashamed by Lucky's actions, where he decides to fight for the couple himself.

Jhansi decides to join Suryanarayana after seeing his drive for justice. At home, they work on the case, splitting the house into halves, which they title themselves as Commercial (Lucky) and Non-Commercial (Suryanaryana and Jhansi). Lucky uses various tricks to hamper Suryanaryana and Jhansi, slanders the couple's names (claiming that he had actually gone to Dubai and had affairs), and nearly gets Suryanaryana disbarred. Meanwhile, Lucky keeps getting gifts from Vivek. Lucky's search for the disappeared husband ends to no avail, and Vivek plans to kill him by putting him in a pillar and casting concrete inside. Lucky also meets a mysterious woman also named Amulya, who is Vivek's wife. Ultimately, Lucky gets a seat as an MLA in Vivek's political party.

As Vivek prepares to be sworn, the news breaks about the body of a cab driver that Vivek had murdered earlier being found at his farmhouse. It is revealed that Amulya is actually Saira Banu, the cab driver's wife. In retaliation, Vivek kidnaps Suryanarayana and asks Lucky to cover his bail. However, Lucky instead saves Suryanarayana from Vivek's goons and reveals that he had planned everything all along to seek vengeance on Vivek ever since he saw Suryanarayana's sufferings as a child following his resignation, and had enlisted Saira Banu to seduce and distract Vivek. Vivek attempts to appeal, but his lawyer deserts him after revealing that Lucky used his gifts and conversations to collect his evidence and biometric traits. Finally, Vivek becomes insane and requests the court to provide him a death penalty.

== Cast ==
- Gopichand as Advocate Ramachandra (Lucky)
- Raashii Khanna as Lawyer Sirisha (Jhansi)
- Sathyaraj as Justice Suryanarayana
- Rao Ramesh as Vivek
- Ajay Ghosh as PA Divakaram
- Chitra Shukla as Amulya
- Subhalekha Sudhakar as Justice Sudhakar
- Praveen as Junior Lawyer Praveen
- Kiran Talasila as ACP
- Anand Ramaraju as Anji
- Srinivasa Reddy as client
- Viva Harsha as Balraju
- P Ramana Reddy as SI Simhachalam
- Saptagiri as Jhansi's assistant
- Sai Krishna as Adarsh
- Raghu Karumanchi as Ayub Khan's goon
- Manik Reddy as Pasha
- Jayalalitha as Judge
- Srikanth Iyengar as Judge
- Aditi Gautam as Saira Banu aka Amulya
- Dev Gill as Ayub Khan
- Varalaxmi Sarathkumar as Senior Lawyer (Cameo appearance)
- Vadlamani Srinivas as Vivek's Lawyer
- Maruthi Dasari as Dancer, Cameo appearance in the title song

== Production ==
In January 2021, sources claimed that director Maruthi will collaborate with Gopichand for a new film. The official announcement of the film and its title were announced in February 2021. Principal photography of the film began in March 2021.

In January 2021, Sai Pallavi was in talks to play a lead, however, Raashi Khanna, who paired up with Gopichand in Jil (2015), and Oxygen (2017), was cast as one of the leads in February 2021. The film marks the third collaboration between Gopichand and Khanna, and also second collaboration between Maruthi and Khanna after Prati Roju Pandage (2019). Eesha Rebba was rumored to be playing a second lead. Anasuya Bharadwaj was roped in for a role. The film shooting has started in Hyderabad in March 2021. In April, due to the second wave of COVID-19 pandemic, the film shooting is postponed. Filming was resumed in August 2021.

== Music ==
Pakka Commercial

Soundtrack album by Jakes Bejoy
- Released: 12 June 2022
- Recorded: 2021–2022
- Genre: Feature film soundtrack
- Length: 16:58
- Language: Telugu
- Label: Aditya Music
- Producers: Jakes Bejoy; Praveen Ninan; Keshav Kalyan

Jakes Bejoy chronology
Jack N' Jill (2022)	Pakka Commercial (2022)	Kaduva (2022)

Singles from Pakka Commercial
- 1. "Pakka Commercial Title Song" Released: 2 February 2022; 2. "Andala Raasi" Released: 1 June 2022

The music rights of the film are sold to Aditya Music. The music of the film is composed by Jakes Bejoy.

Track listing
No.	Title	Lyrics	Singer(s)	Length
1.	"Pakka Commercial Title Song"	Sirivennela Seetharama Sastry	Jakes Bejoy, Vedala Hemachandra	4:33
2.	"Andala Raasi"	Krishna Kanth	Saicharan Bhaskaruni, Ramya Behara	4:11
3.	"Adhirindhi Mastaru Mee Posteru"	Bhaskarabhatla	Sri Krishna, Sahithi Chaganti	4:33
4.	"Lehanga Lo Lady Donu"	Krishna Kanth	Vijay Prakash, M. M. Srilekha	4:01

== Release ==
=== Theatrical ===
The film was initially planned for a theatrical release on 1 October 2021, but due to the second wave of the COVID-19 pandemic, the filming was delayed, and the film's release was initially planned to 24 February 2022, and pushed to 20 May 2022, but eventually postponed and then finally released on 1 July 2022. The total worldwide theatrical distribution rights of the film were sold at a cost of ₹19.20 crore.

=== Home media ===
Digital streaming rights of the film were acquired by Netflix and Aha, whereas the satellite rights were acquired by Star Maa. Digital streaming and satellite rights of the film were sold at a cost of ₹31 crore. The film was premiered on Netflix and Aha on 5 August 2022.

== Reception ==
Pakka Commercial received mixed reviews from critics.

Neeshita Nyayapati of The Times of India rated the film 3 out of 5 stars and wrote "Maruthi has delivered better films, characters and stories in the past; Pakka Commercial is really not his best work". Arvind V of Pinkvilla rated the film 2.5 out of 5 stars and wrote "Amid a sea of mundane ideas, Pakka Commercial manages to offer a few good ideas". Sangeetha Devi Dundoo of The Hindu gave the film a mixed review and said the film is commercial but far from entertaining. Balakrishna Ganeshan of The News Minute criticized the film and gave a rating of 1.5 out of 5 stars while stating that "The performances of actors Gopichand, Sathyaraj and Rao Ramesh are convincing. Raashii Khanna however deserves much of the appreciation for experimenting with comedy and succeeding with it". NTV's Kota opined that forced comedy, routine screenplay and film duration are the negatives whereas performances by lead actors are positives of the film.
