= Baa Bega Chandamama =

- Official poster
- Directed by: Murali
- Written by: Manju Mandavya (dialogues)
- Screenplay by: Murali
- Story by: Murali
- Produced by: G. Kumaraswamy
- Starring: Deepak; Suhasini
- Cinematography: Mathew Rajan
- Edited by: Deepu S. Kumar
- Music by: Murali
- Release date: 10 October 2008
- Country: India
- Language: Kannada

Baa Bega Chandamama (transl. Come fast moon!) is a 2008 Indian Kannada-language action drama film directed by Murali (brother of Sudha Rani) in his directorial debut and starring Deepak and Suhasini. The story is based on The Comedy of Errors. The film's title is based on a line from the song "Amara Madhura Prema" in Rathnagiri Rahasya (1957). The film was a box office failure.

== Cast ==
- Deepak as Deepu
- Suhasini as Preethi
- Avinash as Poonacha
- Bullet Prakash as Prakash
- Jai Jagadish
- Chitra Shenoy

== Soundtrack ==
The music for the film was composed by Murali.

No.	Title	Singer(s)	Length
1.	"Ellindalo Tangali"	K. S. Chitra	4:06
2.	"Nannede Goodali"	Hemanth Kumar, Supriya Acharya	1:04
3.	"O Preethiye"	Shaan	4:36
4.	"Nannalli Nooru Aase (Bit)"	Anuradha Bhat	4:35
5.	"Sangaati Naa Ninna"	Rajesh Krishnan, Anuradha Bhat	4:01
6.	"Hey Maamu"	S. P. Balasubrahmanyam, H. G. Murali	4:01
7.	"Iniyane Baaro"	Rajesh Krishnan, Nanditha	4:02
Total length:			26:25

== Reception ==
A critic from Bangalore Mirror wrote that "Uninspired performances, unintelligent placement of songs and the unnecessary length of the film tests one’s patience." A critic from Rediff.com wrote that "All in all, Baa Bega Chandamama is a no show". A critic from IANS wrote that "Baa Bega Chandamama is an illogical film which lacks excitement in narration".
