= Vaisakham =

Indian Telugu-language drama film

- Release poster
- Directed by: B. Jaya
- Produced by: B. A. Raju
- Starring: Harish; Avantika Mishra; Sai Kumar
- Cinematography: Vaalisetty Venkata Subba Rao
- Music by: DJ Vasanth
- Release date: 21 July 2017
- Country: India
- Language: Telugu

Vaisakham is a 2017 Indian Telugu-language drama film written and directed by B. Jaya. It stars Harish, Avantika Mishra, and Sai Kumar. It was released theatrically on 21 July 2017.

== Cast ==
- Harish as Venu
- Avantika Mishra as Bhanu
- Sai Kumar
- Eeswari Rao
- Rama Prabha
- Prudhvi Raj as Babu Rao
- Y. Kasi Viswanath
- Krishna Bhagavaan
- Gundu Sudarshan
- Bhadram as Venu's friend
- Jenny

== Production ==
=== Filming ===
Principal photography began on 20 June 2016 in ramalingeswara Swamy temple in Keesaragutta. on 17 February 2017 shooting completed.

== Soundtrack ==
| No. | Title | Singer(s) | Length |
|---|---|---|---|
| 1. | "Prardhisthane" | Chorus, Sai Charan | 4:24 |
| 2. | "Come On Country Chilaka" | Anurag Kulkarni, Ramya Behara | 4:12 |
| 3. | "Vaisakham" | Anurag Kulkarni, Satya Yamini | 4:37 |
| 4. | "Bhanumathi Bhanumathi" | Ramya Behara, Sai Charan | 4:17 |
| 5. | "Daggaragaa Raavoddilaga" | Ramya Behara, Simha | 3:37 |
| 6. | "Vaisakham Theme-1" (Instrumental) | | 0:53 |
| 7. | "Vaisakham Theme-2" (Instrumental) | | 1:07 |

== Reception ==
=== Critical response ===
Srivathsan Nadadhur of The Hindu wrote, "The climax offers some surprise, though there’s a déjà vu of Nithya Menen’s thread in S/O Sathyamurthy. An undernourished sub-plot about valuing human relationships over dogmatic practices is the silver lining here that could have been the film’s main plot". Shruti Soumya of The Times of India wrote "To ensure her business kicks off smoothly, Bhanumathi pretends to be Venu’s girlfriend before the world. When Venu confronts her, she tries to convince him that it is a good idea to continue with the lie so that they both don't get into trouble". Kumar Shiva of India Herald says "Even though the songs and dialogues are fine, it seems that there is something new missing in the story of the movie. As the artistes are new, it takes some time for the audience to digest them. Overall, it can be said that the movie is a good effort by Jaya. But it would have been better to be more careful".
