= Kamna Jethmalani =

Indian actress

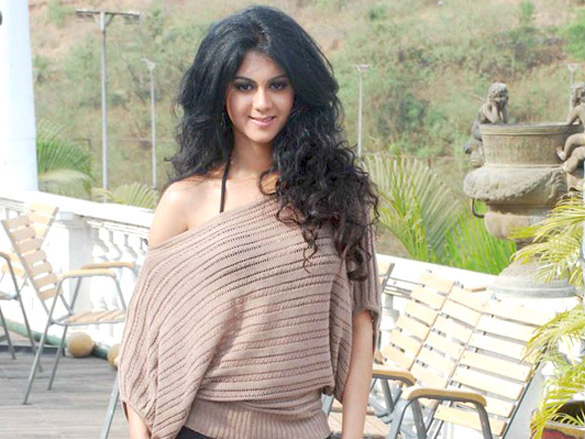
- Jethmalani at photoshoot
- Born: Mumbai
- Occupations: Actress, model
- Years active: 2004–present
- Spouse: Suraj Nagpal (m. 2014)

Kamna Jethmalani is an Indian actress who primarily appears in Telugu films. She made her debut in 2005 with Premikulu and gained recognition with her first commercial success, Ranam (2006). She went on to play lead roles in several Telugu films and also appeared in Tamil, Malayalam, and Kannada films.

== Early life ==
Kamna Jethmalani was born into a Sindhi Hindu family in Mumbai. She is the granddaughter of businessman Shyam Jethmalani and the great-niece of lawyer and politician Ram Jethmalani. Ram Jethmalani is the brother of her grandfather. Her father, Nimesh Jethmalani, is a businessman, while her mother, Divya, is a homemaker. She has a brother, Kapil, and a sister, Karishma. Her pet name is "Dinky."

She was the runner-up at the Miss Mumbai contest in 2004 and also appeared in the music video of the pop song 'Chhod do Aanchal Zamaana Kya Kahega' by Bombay Vikings & Mera Dadla by Vaishali Samant & Avadhoot Gupte.

== Personal life ==
On 11 August 2014, Kamna married Suraj Nagpal, a Bangalore-based businessman.

== Career ==
She appeared in the video of "Chhod Do Aanchal Zamaana Kya Kahega" by Neeraj Shridhar – Bombay Vikings in 2004. The following year, she made her movie debut with the Telugu film Premikulu. Though that film flopped, her subsequent film Ranam was a big hit. Her first Tamil film was Idhaya Thirudan with Jayam Ravi. She did an item number in the film Sainikudu. She has acted in Machakaaran opposite Jeevan. Since then, she has done several south Indian films, in which she performed the lead role.

== Filmography ==
=== Films ===
Year	Film	Role	Language	Notes
2005	Premikulu	Vennela	Telugu	
2005	Idhaya Thirudan	Deepika	Tamil	credited as Kamna
2006	Ranam	Maheswari	Telugu	
2006	Samanyudu	Vandana	Telugu	
2006	Sainikudu	Herself	Telugu	Special appearance in song
2007	Toss	Kamna	Telugu	
2007	Ugadi	Kaveri	Kannada	Dubbed into Telugu as America Alludu in 2011
2007	Machakaaran	Shivani	Tamil	Dubbed into Telugu as Dheera in 2009
2008	King	Herself	Telugu	
2008	Andamaina Abadham	Vaishnavi	Telugu	
2009	Bendu Apparao R.M.P	Padma Priya	Telugu	
2009	Rajadhi Raja	Namitha	Tamil	
2010	Kathi Kantha Rao	Ratnam	Telugu	
2011	Makeup Man	Chandra	Malayalam	
2011	Kasethan Kadavulada	Archana	Tamil	
2013	Proprietors: Kammath & Kammath		Malayalam	
2013	Action 3D	Anitha	Telugu	
2013	Sri Jagadguru Aadi Sankara	Queen	Telugu	
2013	Bhai	Colony girl	Telugu	
2014	Agraja		Kannada	
2015	Chandrika	Chandrika	Kannada; Telugu	
2022	Garuda	Madhu	Kannada	
2025	K-Ramp	Psychiatrist's Wife	Telugu	Cameo appearance
2026	Gaayapadda Simham	Dr. Pavitra Melton	Telugu	

=== Web series ===
Year	Web series	Role	Language	Notes
2023	Vyavastha	Gayathri Chakraborthy	Telugu	ZEE5 web series
