= Tholi Valapu =

2001 film by Muthyala Subbaiah

- Movie Poster
- Directed by: Muthyala Subbaiah
- Written by: Vara Prasad Varma (dialogues)
- Screenplay by: Muthyala Subbaiah
- Story by: Vara Prasad Varma
- Produced by: M. Nageswara Rao
- Starring: Gopichand; Sneha; P. Ravishankar
- Cinematography: R. Rama Rao; K. V. Ramana Kumar
- Edited by: Kola Bhaskar
- Music by: Vandemataram Srinivas
- Production company: T. Krishna Memorial Films
- Release date: 3 August 2001
- Running time: 144 mins
- Country: India
- Language: Telugu

Tholi Valapu (transl. First Love) is a 2001 Indian Telugu-language drama film produced by M. Nageswara Rao under the T. Krishna Memorial Films banner, directed by Muthyala Subbaiah. It stars Gopichand and Sneha, with music composed by Vandemataram Srinivas. This film was the debut of Gopichand. It didn't do so well at the box office and made Gopichand wait for a while to be a hero for his next film.

The film was later dubbed and released in Tamil as Hari and in Hindi as Blast Barood.

== Plot ==
Prem lives with his friends in the city. His dream is to own a bike, and with some help from his rural agriculturist father, he does get it. However, on the first night itself it gets punctured, and because there is no mechanic around so late, Prem decides to park it in a nearby house for the night. The door is opened by a very pretty girl Soumya, and the smitten and dumbstruck Prem manages to explain his predicament and leaves the bike and keys. The next morning when he goes to pick up the bike, he doesn't find it, and the girl and her father completely deny any knowledge. Our man understandably gets riled and creates a ruckus, but to no avail.

The story progresses and a thief is caught who admits to having burgled the house in question that night. But the father continues to stoutly deny any such happening. This creates some confusion, and then the burglar reveals that he also molested the daughter. There has to be a villain somewhere - enter wicked son-in-law Kailash, who is the husband of the elder daughter. Kailash grinds the family about the police case where Soumya under pressure confesses that she is the one who got molested that night. Kailash then spreads the news about Soumya and even gets the families to call off marriage with her. Prem, however, who is in love with her agrees to marry her despite allegations. After marriage, Soumya becomes pregnant, and Kailash poisons Prem's parents' mind that the child can be a molester's child and prompts them to force Soumya to abort the child. With no other option, Soumya gives in and almost gets her child aborted but at the nick of time, Soumya's sister comes in. She reveals to everyone that she was molested that night, and Soumya takes the blame because Kailash would never accept her sister if she were molested. Soumya's sister then breaks all ties with Kailash and all live happily ever after.

== Cast ==
- Gopichand as Prem
- Sneha as Soumya
- P. Ravi Shankar as Kailash
- Chandra Mohan as Peddireddy Mohan Rao
- Sudhakar as Sundaram
- Ali as Prem's friend
- Sunil as Prem's friend
- L.B. Sriram as Annavaram
- M.S. Narayana as Insurance Narayana
- Vinod as Police Inspector
- Tirupathi Prakash as Tirupathi
- Gautham Raju as Servant
- Kallu Chidambaram as Zoo Incharge
- Sudha as Prem's mother
- Madhurisen as Suguna
- Tejaswini as Sandhya

== Production ==
A few songs were shot in New Zealand.

== Soundtrack ==
Tholi Valapu

Film score by Vandemataram Srinivas
- Released: 2001
- Genre: Soundtrack
- Length: 29:36
- Label: Mayuri Audio
- Producer: Vandemataram Srinivas

Vandemataram Srinivas chronology
Ammo Okkato Tariku (2001)	Tholi Valapu (2001)	Chirujallu (2001)

Music composed by Vandemataram Srinivas. Music released Mayuri Audio Company.

No.	Title	Lyrics	Singer(s)	Length
1.	"First Rank Manaderaa"	Chandrabose	K.K.	5:26
2.	"Paalato Kadigina"	Chandrabose	Hariharan, K.S.Chithra	5:14
3.	"Boforce Bullama"	Chandrabose	Sukhwinder Singh	4:33
4.	"Main Tumse Pyar"	Veturi	Udit Narayan, Sadhana Sargam	4:20
5.	"Kurrakaruki Bikeunte"	Chandrabose	K. K.	5:07
6.	"Vandanam"	Sai Harsha	Kumar Sanu, Kavita Krishnamurthy	4:56
Total length:				29:36

== Reception ==
Ajay Bashyam of Full Hyderabad opined that the film was "just about okay" and was for "timepass". A critic from Cine South wrote that "Tholi Valapu is an impressive show of love in a new dimension and worth, a try". CV of Telugucinema.com wrote, "Director Muthyala Subbaiah has good intentions to launch his guru's son as a hero but he did not work hard to make it big. But for suspense building twist in the beginning itself the rest of the story couldn't sustain the tempo".
