= Gopichand (actor) =

Indian actor

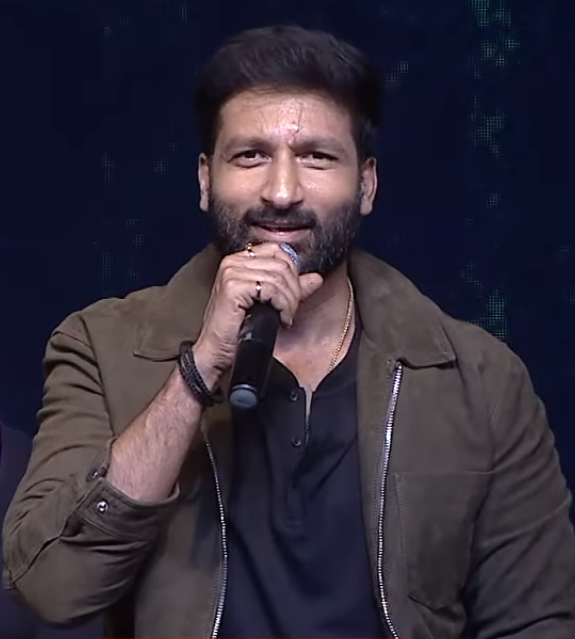
- Gopichand in 2019
- Born: Tottempudi Gopichand; 12 June 1979 (age 47); Kakuturivaripalem, Andhra Pradesh, India
- Other names: Action Star; Macho Star
- Occupation: Actor
- Years active: 2001–present
- Height: 6 ft 1 in (185 cm)
- Spouse: Reshma (m. 2013)
- Children: 2
- Father: T. Krishna
- Website: Official website

Tottempudi Gopichand (born 12 June 1979) is an Indian actor who works primarily in Telugu cinema. Known for his roles in action films, he made his debut with Tholi Valapu (2001) in a lead role. After playing an antagonist in films such as Jayam (2002), Nijam (2003), and Varsham (2004), he got his breakthrough as a protagonist with Yagnam in 2004.

His notable works include Andhrudu (2005), Ranam (2006), Lakshyam (2007), Souryam (2008), Golimaar (2010), Sahasam (2013), Loukyam (2014), Jil (2015), Goutham Nanda (2017), Seetimaarr (2021), and Pakka Commercial (2022). He is fondly referred to as "Action Star" and "Macho Star".

== Early life ==
Gopichand was born in a village near Tangutur in Prakasam district, Andhra Pradesh. He is the younger son of the filmmaker T. Krishna and was 8 years old when his father died. He was schooled at Nil Desperandum, Ongole (established by his father) and Ramakrishna Mission school, Chennai. He studied mechanical engineering in Russia.

His elder brother Premchand was an associate director under Muthyala Subbaiah and started working as a director; however, he died in a car accident. Gopichand was in Russia at that time and could not attend his funeral due to visa issues. He also has a younger sister, who is a dentist.

After completing his engineering, he decided to pursue a career in films to continue his father's legacy and did a dialogue modulation course for a year. He is close friends with actor Prabhas, V. Vamsi Krishna Reddy, and Pramod Uppalapati; the latter two own UV Creations, a prominent production house in Telugu cinema, which produced his films Jil and Pakka Commercial.

== Career ==
=== 2001–2015: Debut, negative roles, and success ===
Gopichand made his debut as a lead with the film Tholi Valapu, which was a failure causing him to play negative roles in his next films Jayam, Nijam and Varsham as well as Jayam's Tamil remake. He made his re-entry as hero with the films Yagnam in 2004 and Andhrudu in 2005. In 2006, he starred in the commercially successful Ranam and the commercially unsuccessful Raraju. His 2007 releases Okkadunnadu and Lakshyam, and the 2008 releases were Ontari and Souryam. He collaborated once again with Souryam director Siva for their 2009 release Sankham.

His 2010 release Golimar saw him playing an encounter specialist inspired by the real-life cop Daya Nayak. In 2011, he acted in Mogudu and Wanted but both were commercial failures. In 2013, he reunited with director Chandra Sekhar Yeleti (after Okkadunnadu) for the action-adventure film Sahasam which became his biggest commercially successful film at that time. In 2014, he starred in Loukyam commercially became his most successful film. In 2015, he starred in Jil, which was his last successful film.

=== 2015–present: Resurgence ===
His next 2015 release was Soukhyam, and in 2017, he starred in Goutham Nanda and Oxygen, all of which were both commercially unsuccessful. His next film Aaradugula Bullet was slated to release the same year but did not materialize until 2021 and was a failure. In 2018, he played a vigilante in Pantham, which was his 25th film. In 2019, he played a spy in Chanakya.

In 2021, his sports action film Seetimaarr, directed by Sampath Nandi received positive reviews and was a success in the box office. The film star co-stars Tamannaah Bhatia, Digangana Suryavanshi, and Bhumika Chawla. He has also worked on another film, Pakka Commercial which was directed by Maruthi and also featured Raashi Khanna. His next movie, Ramabanam, directed by Sriwass was released in May 2023 and released to negative reviews. It was a box-office bomb. This film marked the return of the combination of Sriwass and Gopichand, and also was Gopichand's 30th film. His next film, Bhimaa (2024), was directed by A. Harsha and was a fantasy action drama film. The film was released to negative reviews.

== Personal life ==
He was born and raised in Tangutur, Andhra Pradesh. He married Reshma, niece of Telugu actor Srikanth in 2013. The couple has two sons.

== Filmography ==
=== Films ===
Key
†	Denotes films that have not yet been released

- All films are in Telugu unless otherwise noted.

Year	Title	Role(s)	Notes	Ref.
2001	Tholi Valapu	Prem		
2002	Jayam	Raghu		
2003	Nijam	Devadaya “Devudu” Sharma		
2003	Jayam	Raghu	Tamil film	
2004	Varsham	Bhadranna		
2004	Yagnam	Seenu		
2005	Andhrudu	Surendra		
2006	Ranam	Chinna		
2006	Raraju	Kaali		
2007	Okkadunnadu	Kiran		
2007	Lakshyam	Chandu		
2008	Ontari	Vamsi		
2008	Souryam	Vijay IPS		
2009	Sankham	Chandu		
2010	Golimaar	Inspector Gangaram		
2011	Wanted	Ram Babu		
2011	Mogudu	Ram Prasad "Bujji"		
2013	Sahasam	Goutham		
2014	Loukyam	Venkateswarlu "Venky"		
2015	Jil	Jai		
2015	Soukhyam	Srinivas "Seenu" Rao		
2017	Goutham Nanda	Goutham Ghattamaneni and Nanda Kishore (Note: Gopichand played dual characters in a single film)		
2017	Oxygen	Major Sanjeev / Krishna Prasad (Note: Gopichand played a single character with two names)		
2018	Pantham	Vikranth		
2019	Chanakya	Arjun / Ramakrishna		
2021	Seetimaarr	Karthi		
2021	Aaradugula Bullet	Shiva		
2022	Pakka Commercial	Adv. Ramchand		
2023	Ramabanam	Vicky / Ramabanam		
2024	Bhimaa	Bhimaa and Ramaa		
2024	Viswam	Viswam		

== Awards and nominations ==
Year	Film	Award	Category	Result	Ref
2003	Jayam	CineMAA Awards	Best Villain	Won	
2003	Jayam	Filmfare Awards South	Best Villain – Telugu	Nominated	
2003	Jayam	Nandi Awards	Best Villain	Won	
2004	Nijam	CineMAA Awards	Best Villain	Won	
2005	Varsham	CineMAA Awards	Best Villain	Won	
