= Adhu =

- Poster
- Directed by: Ramesh Krishnan
- Written by: Ramesh Krishnan; Balakumaran (dialogues)
- Produced by: V. Sundar
- Starring: Sneha; Abbas; Aravind; Suha
- Cinematography: P. Selvakumar
- Edited by: N. P. Sathish
- Music by: Yuvan Shankar Raja
- Production company: Vishwas Films
- Release date: 15 October 2004
- Country: India
- Language: Tamil

Adhu (transl. That) is a 2004 Indian Tamil-language supernatural horror film directed by Ramesh Balakrishnan, starring Sneha as a spirit possessed girl. The film, that has a newcomer Aravind, Suha, Kazan Khan and Vijayan in supporting and Abbas in a cameo role, is a remake of the 2002 Hong Kong-Thai-Singaporean film The Eye. The film, with music scored by Yuvan Shankar Raja and cinematography by P. Selvakumar, released on 15 October 2004.

== Plot ==
Meera is transplanted with the eyes of Kayalvizhi which enables her to see able to see things not visible to other's eyes. Haunted and harassed by Kayalvizhi's Spirit, Meera goes all the way to Vijayanagaram to get to the bottom of the intrigue, because the spirit orders her to do so getting to know of Kayalvizhi's story and the injustice done to her by the village head. The spirit of Kayalvizhi seeks revenge and retribution. How it achieves this forms the story

== Cast ==
- Sneha as Meera
- Abbas as Doctor Raj (cameo)
- Aravind as Arvind
- Suha as Kayalvizhi
- Kazan Khan
- Vijayan
- Saranya as Meera's mother
- Shanmugarajan as Muthu
- Aryan as sorcerer

== Music ==
The film score was composed by Yuvan Shankar Raja. The film has only one song, and a soundtrack was not released.

== Reception ==
Malathi Rangarajan of The Hindu wrote, "Taking up a story that touches upon ESP, effluents, pollution and the havoc it creates on human life, Ramesh Krishnan places them in a genre that spells horror. The result is quite interesting. Those of you who like to experience just a bit of fear, the occult kind, can make a beeline for Adhu". Malini Mannath of Chennai Online wrote, "It's Sneha's film the whole way. But making an impact is debutante Suha as Kalaivizhi, and new face Arvind who projects creditably the cynic who later goes all to support Meera". Sify wrote that "the trouble with Adhu is that it does not provide you with the chills and thrills associated with a ghost story. Though the film is only 116 minutes it drags and the special effects are too cheesy and amateurish. The climax looks like an amman film, as the spirit and the evil tantric clash".
