= Chantigadu =

- VCD cover
- Directed by: Jaya
- Written by: Jaya
- Dialogue by: Marudhuri Raja
- Produced by: BA Raju
- Starring: Baladitya; Suhasini
- Cinematography: Poorna K.
- Music by: Vandemataram Srinivas
- Production company: Superhit Friends
- Release date: 26 November 2003
- Running time: 139 minutes
- Country: India
- Language: Telugu
- Budget: ₹80 lakh

Chantigadu is a 2003 Indian Telugu-language romantic drama film directed by Jaya and starring Baladitya in his lead debut and newcomer Suhasini with Saranya and Ahuti Prasad in supporting roles.

== Cast ==
- Baladitya as Chantigadu
- Suhasini as Seetamahalakshmi
- Saranya as Savthriyamma
- Ahuti Prasad as Reddappa
- Rajeev Kanakala
- Brahmanandam
- L. B. Sriram
- Gautam Raju
- Bhikshu
- Sudarshan
- Phani as Chantigadu's friend
- Jr. Relangi
- Rambabu as Chantigadu's friend
- Pavan as Chantigadu's friend
- Jagadish as Chantigadu's friend
- CVS
- Padmanabha Sharma
- Murali Pendyala

== Production ==
The shooting for the film began on 9 June 2003 in Hyderabad. The song "Kokkoroko" was choreographed by the duo Venu-Pal and was shot on 20 June 2003.

== Soundtrack ==
The music was composed by Vandemataram Srinivas, and the lyrics were written by Bhuvana Chandra, Kasarla Shyam and Paidisetty Ram. The audio release function was held on 30 September 2003. The music CD was released by N. T. Rama Rao Jr. on 7 October 2003.

Track listing
No.	Title	Writer(s)	Singer(s)	Length
1.	"Swathi Muthyamy"		Karthik, Usha	5:35
2.	"Chirugalilaa"		S. P. Charan, Usha	4:23
3.	"Love Me Love Me"		Shreya Ghoshal	4:56
4.	"Okkasari Pilichavante"		Udit Narayan, Mahalakshmi Iyer	5:37
5.	"Siggulolike Seethalu"		Gangadhar, Sunitha	5:16
6.	"Kokkoroko"	Kasarla Shyam	Shankar Mahadevan	4:19
7.	"Seetha Koka Chilukalu"	Kasarla Shyam	S. P. Balasubrahmanyam	5:46
Total length:				35:52

== Release ==
=== Reception ===
Jeevi of Idlebrain.com rated the film 3 1/4 out of 5 and wrote that "This film comes as a whiff of fresh air when we find every Telugu film that is releasing in recent times failing to appeal to the audiences".

=== Box office ===
The film was a box office success and ran for fifty days.
