= V. Manikandan =

Indian cinematographer

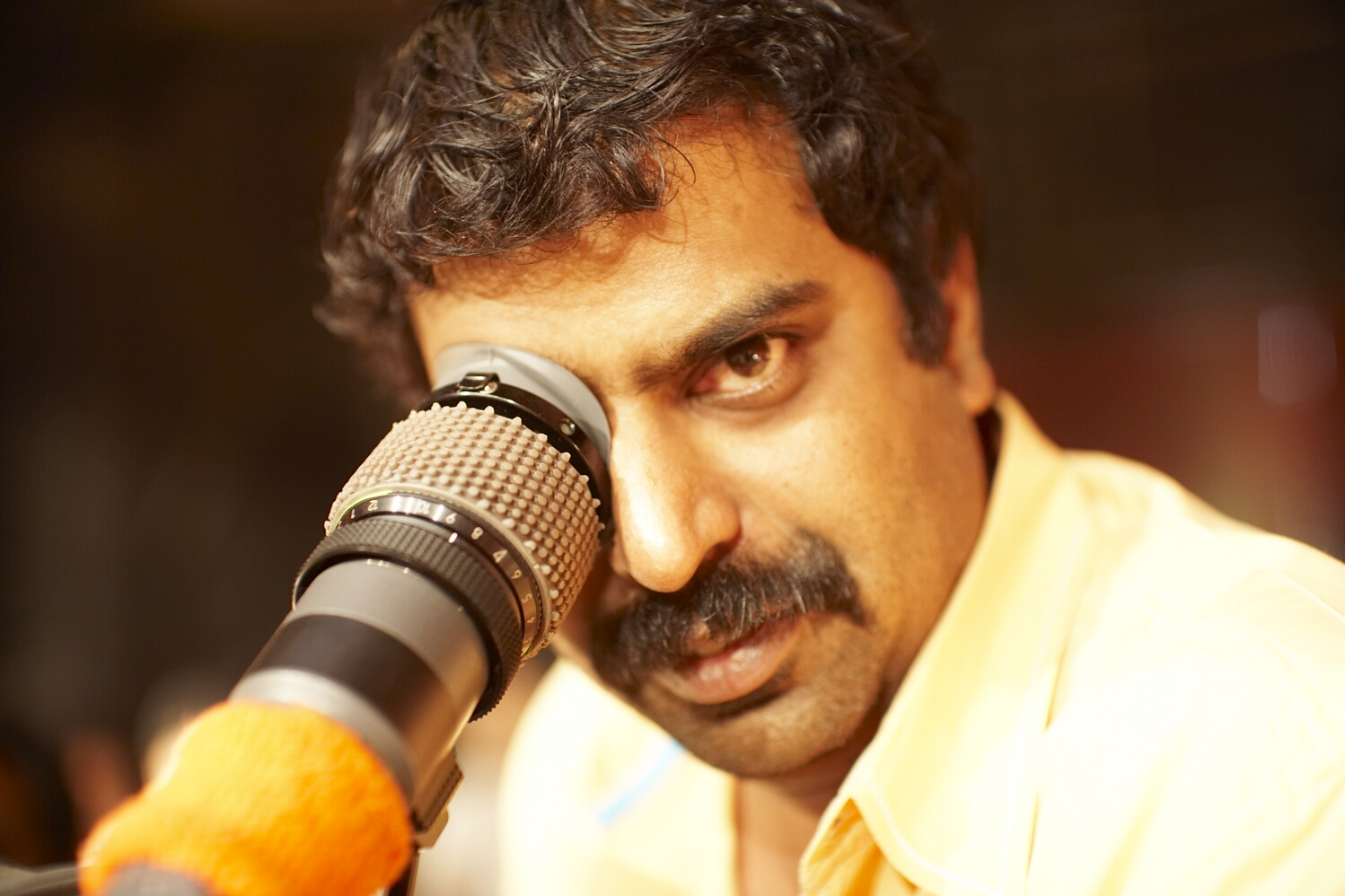
- Born: Velayutham Manikandan; 13 January 1968 (age 58); Coimbatore, Tamil Nadu, India
- Education: Madras Film Institute
- Occupations: Cinematographer; Director of Photography

V. Manikandan is a cinematographer who has worked for a number of major box-office hits in Hindi, Tamil, and Malayalam. He is also an ad film cinematographer with more than 3000 ad films to his credit.

His well-known works are Main Hoon Na (2004), Anniyan (2005), Om Shanti Om (2007), Yeh Jawaani Hai Deewani (2013), and Brahmastra: Part One - Shiva (2022).

== Filmography ==
Year	Film	Language	Notes
1994	Adharmam	Tamil	
1994	Sarigamapadani	Tamil	
1996	Sengottai	Tamil	
1996	Mr. Romeo	Tamil	
1997	Asuravamsam	Malayalam	
2000	Pennin Manathai Thottu	Tamil	
2003	Kuch Naa Kaho	Hindi	
2004	Main Hoon Na	Hindi	
2005	Anniyan	Tamil	Filmfare Award for Best Cinematographer – South
2005	Police	Malayalam	
2007	Om Shanti Om	Hindi	Filmfare Award - Nominated for Best Cinematography
2009	Billu Barber	Hindi	
2010	Raavan; Raavanan	Hindi; Tamil	Apsara Award - Won for Best Cinematography; Asia Pacific Cine Awards (ASPA) - Nominated for Best Cinematography
2010	Khatta Meetha	Hindi	
2011	Ra.One	Hindi	9th Annual Central European Bollywood Award(ACEBA-2012) - Won for Best Cinematography
2013	Yeh Jawaani Hai Deewani	Hindi	
2015	Prem Ratan Dhan Payo	Hindi	
2018	Agnyaathavaasi	Telugu	
2022	Brahmāstra: Part One – Shiva	Hindi	
2023	Kisi Ka Bhai Kisi Ki Jaan	Hindi	
2025	Housefull 5	Hindi	

=== Additional cinematography ===
Year	Film	Language	Notes
2003	Boys	Tamil	1 Song
2023	Dunki	Hindi	1 song
2024	Ishq Vishk Rebound	Hindi	1 song
2025	Baaghi 4	Hindi	1 song

== Awards and nominations ==
=== Filmfare Awards ===
- 2005 Won for Best Cinematography for the film Anniyan
- 2007 Nominated for Best Cinematography for the film Om Shanti Om

=== Apsara Film & Television Producers Guild Awards ===
- 2011 Won Best Cinematography Award for the film Raavan

=== Asia Pacific Cine Awards(ASPA) ===
- 2010 Nominated for Best Cinematography for the film Raavanan

=== Annual Central European Bollywood Awards ===
- 2012 Won Best Cinematography Award for the film Ra.One
