= Yagnam (2004 film) =

2004 Indian action film

- Movie poster
- Directed by: A.S. Ravi Kumar Chowdary
- Written by: Marudhuri Raja (dialogues)
- Screenplay by: A.S. Ravi Kumar Chowdary
- Story by: Eetharam Films unit
- Produced by: Pokuri Babu Rao
- Starring: Gopichand; Moon Banerjee
- Cinematography: Ch. Ramana Raju
- Edited by: Gautham Raju
- Music by: Mani Sharma
- Production company: Eetharam Films
- Release date: 2 July 2004
- Running time: 144 minutes
- Country: India
- Language: Telugu
- Box office: ₹9 crore distributors' share

Yagnam (transl. Ritual / Sacrifice) is a 2004 Indian Telugu-language action film produced by Pokuri Babu Rao on the Eetharam Films banner, directed by A.S. Ravi Kumar Chowdary. It was released on 2 July 2004. It stars Gopichand and Moon Banerjee (credited as Sameera Banerjee), with music composed by Mani Sharma. The film was remade in Tamil as Mannin Maindhan (2005). The film won two Nandi Awards and was a blockbuster hit.

In 2007, the film was later dubbed and released in Hindi as Aaj Ka Raavan Raaj.

== Plot ==
Seenu is a loyal servant and the right-hand man of faction leader Reddeppa. He and Sailaja, Reddeppa's daughter, grew up together. Nayudamma is an archrival of Reddeppa. Factional feuds between them have resulted in the loss of several lives among their groups. When Reddeppa realizes that his daughter and Seenu are in love, he swings into action, trying to kill Seenu. The rest of the story is about how Seenu secures Sailaja's hand in marriage and unites the forces of followers in both the warring groups to teach their masters (Reddeppa and Nayudamma) a lesson or two.

== Cast ==
- Gopichand as Srinivas aka Seenu (Srinu)
  - Master Vivek as Young Srinivas aka Seenu
- Moon Banerjee as Sailaja aka Sailu
  - Baby Nikshipta Rao as Young Sailaja aka Sailu
- Prakash Raj as Inspector Pratap Reddy
- Devaraj as Redappa
- Vijaya Rangaraju as Nayudamma (credited as Raj Kumar)
- Dharmavarapu Subramanyam
- Narra Venkateswara Rao
- Raghu Babu as Suri, Seenu's rival
- Suman Setty as Dilli, Seenu's friend
- Jhansi as Suri's wife
- Jahnavi as Fathima
- Baby Trisha as Suri's daughter

== Production ==
The filming occurred in and around Araku Valley, Vishakhapatnam, Ichchapuram, Srikakulam, and Vizianagaram in the Coastal Andhra area, the capital city Hyderabad, and in the outskirts of Kadapa and Kurnool cities in the Rayalaseema region of Andhra Pradesh.

== Soundtrack ==
Yagnam

Soundtrack album by Mani Sharma
- Released: 6 June 2004
- Recorded: 2004
- Genre: Soundtrack
- Length: 26:41
- Label: Maruthi Music
- Producer: Mani Sharma

Mani Sharma chronology
Samba (2004)	Yagnam (2004)	Sri Anjaneyam (2004)

The music was composed by Mani Sharma. The music was released on the Maruthi Music Company label. The song "Chinnanaati Chelikade" is based on "Kanavu Kanalam" from Jai (2004).

No.	Title	Lyrics	Singer(s)	Length
1.	"Chamak Chamakmani"	Suddala Ashok Teja	Sandeep, Mallikarjun	5:13
2.	"Emchesavo Na Manasu"	Suddala Ashok Teja	S. P. B. Charan, Shreya Ghoshal	5:37
3.	"Chinnanaati Chelikade"	Sirivennela Sitarama Sastry	S. P. Balasubrahmanyam, Shreya Ghoshal	5:39
4.	"Haayiga Amma Vollo"	Sirivennela Sitarama Sastry	Gopika Poornima, Vardhini	5:23
5.	"Thongi Thongi"	Suddala Ashok Teja	Hariharan, Swarnalatha	4:34
Total length:				26:41

== Reception ==
B. Anuradha of IANS wrote that "Debutant director Ravikumar Choudury fuses a good love story into this anger-driven film with a message." Jeevi of Idlebrain.com wrote that "This film is definitely worth a watch for the brilliant performance of Gopichand and its first half." A critic from Sify wrote that "On the whole Yagnam is a decent entertainer which will be lapped up by the mass audience".

== Awards ==
Nandi Awards - 2004

- Best Male Comedian - Dharmavarapu Subramanyam
- Best Female Comedian - Jahnavi
