= B. Jaya (director) =

Indian film director

- Born: 11 January 1964
- Died: 30 August 2018 (aged 54); Hyderabad, Telangana, India
- Occupation: Film director
- Years active: 2003–2018
- Spouse: B. A. Raju

B. Jaya (11 January 1964 – 30 August 2018) was an Indian film director who worked in Telugu cinema.

== Early life ==
Jaya completed an MA in English literature and received a diploma in journalism at Chennai University. She also received an MA in psychology from Annamalai University.

Jaya married producer and publicist B. A. Raju (died 2021). They have two sons.

== Career ==
After completing her education, she started her career as a writer for the Telugu daily newspaper Andhra Jyothy. She wrote for the publication's "Jyothi Chitra" section, which covers news regarding the Telugu cinema industry. She made her debut as a director with the successful 2003 film Chantigadu.

== Death ==
Jaya died on 30 August 2018 at the age of 54 due to heart related ailments.

== Filmography ==
Year	Film	Notes
2003	Chantigadu	
2005	Premikulu	
2007	Gundamma Gaari Manavadu	
2008	Saval	
2012	Lovely	
2017	Vaisakham	
