= List of Telugu films of 2024 =

This is a list of Telugu films released in 2024.

== Box office collection ==
The following is the list of highest-grossing Telugu films released in 2024. The rank of the films in the following table depends on the estimate of worldwide collections as reported by organizations classified as green by Wikipedia. (Note: See WP:RSP, WP:ICTFSOURCES) There is no official tracking of domestic box office figures within India.

Background shading indicates that a film is currently showing in theatres worldwide.

Highest grossing Telugu films of 2024
Rank (Note: Sorted based on the lowest value when figures are presented as a range, and for the same value, the older item is given a higher order.)	Title	Production company	Worldwide gross	Ref.
1	Pushpa 2: The Rule	Mythri Movie Makers; Sukumar Writings	₹1,642–1,800 crore	(Note: Pushpa 2's reported worldwide grosses vary between ₹1,642 crore (The Hans India) – ₹1,800 crore (Deccan Chronicle; The Indian Express).)
2	Kalki 2898 AD	Vyjayanthi Movies	₹1,042–1,200 crore	(Note: Kalki 2898 AD's reported worldwide grosses vary between ₹1,042 (The Financial Express (India)) –₹1,052.5 crore (ThePrint) – ₹1,100 crore (Deccan Chronicle, Business Standard, Deccan Herald, Hindustan Times and The Statesman))
3	Devara: Part 1	Yuvasudha Arts; N. T. R. Arts	₹380–521 crore	(Note: Devara's reported worldwide grosses vary between ₹380 crore (Box Office India) – ₹420 crore (DNA India) – ₹509 crore (Business Standard) – ₹521 crore (Bollywood Hungama))
4	Hanu-Man	PrimeShow Entertainment	₹298–350 crore	(Note: Hanu-Man's reported worldwide grosses vary between ₹298 crore (Hindustan Times) – ₹350 crore (Hindustan Times, The Indian Express))
5	Guntur Kaaram	Haarika & Hassine Creations	₹184–212 crore	
6	Tillu Square	Sithara Entertainments; Fortune Four Cinemas	₹135 crore	
7	Lucky Baskhar	Sithara Entertainments; Fortune Four Cinemas	₹106.75 crore	
8	Saripodhaa Sanivaaram	DVV Entertainment	₹100 crore	
9	KA	Srichakraas Entertainments; KA Productions	₹50 crore	
10	Naa Saami Ranga	Srinivasa Silver Screen	₹38 crore	

== January–March ==
Opening		Title	Director	Cast	Production company	Ref.
J A N U A R Y	1	Sarkaaru Noukari	Ganganamoni Shekar	Akash Goparaju; Bhavana Vazhapandal; Mani Chandana; Tanikella Bharani; Sammeta Gandhi	RK Teleshow	
J A N U A R Y	5	1134	Ssharadh Chandra Tadimeti	Krishna Madupu; Gangadhar Reddy; Phani Bhargav; Phani Sharma; Suneal Patel	Ramdhuni Creations	
J A N U A R Y	5	14 Days Love	Nagaraj Bodem	Manoj Puttur; Chandini Bagawanani; Raja Ravindra; Shanoor Sana	Supriya Entertainments	
J A N U A R Y	5	Deenamma Jeevitham	Yalla Murali Krishna	Dev Ballani; Priya Chohan; Saritha Chohan	Durgasree Films; Yashwanth Rama Swamy Creations	
J A N U A R Y	5	Double Engine	Rohit Penumatsa	Muni Myatari; Ajith Mohan; Rohit Narsimha; Raju Shivaratri	Waltair Productions	
J A N U A R Y	5	Plantman: Mokka Manishi	Santhosh Babu	Chandrashekar Pulaputra; Sonali Panigrahy; Yadamma Raju; Nandem Shekar	DM Universal Studios	
J A N U A R Y	5	Prema Katha	Shivashakti Red De	Kishore Shanthi Dhinakaran; Diya Seetepalli; Vinay Mahadev; Nethra Reddy	Tanga Productions; Cine Valley Movies	
J A N U A R Y	5	Raghava Reddy	Sanjeev Megoti	Siva Kantamaneni; Nandita Swetha; Raasi	Lightouver Cinemusic	
J A N U A R Y	5	Shaan (Love War)	Busa Kumar Yadav	Busa Kumar Yadav; Priya Deshpang; Velagandula Suchitra	KY Films	
J A N U A R Y	12	Guntur Kaaram	Trivikram Srinivas	Mahesh Babu; Sreeleela; Meenakshi Chaudhary; Jagapathi Babu; Ramya Krishnan; Jayaram; Prakash Raj	Haarika and Hassine Creations	
J A N U A R Y	12	Hanu-Man	Prasanth Varma	Teja Sajja; Amritha Aiyer; Varalaxmi Sarathkumar; Samuthirakani; Vinay Rai	Primeshow Entertainment	
J A N U A R Y	13	Saindhav	Sailesh Kolanu	Venkatesh; Nawazuddin Siddiqui; Arya; Shraddha Srinath; Ruhani Sharma; Andrea Jeremiah	Niharika Entertainment	
J A N U A R Y	14	Naa Saami Ranga	Vijay Binni	Nagarjuna; Ashika Ranganath; Allari Naresh; Raj Tarun; Rukshar Dhillon; Mirnaa Menon	Srinivasa Silver Screen; Annapurna Studios	
J A N U A R Y	20	Kotha Rangula Prapancham	Prudhvi Raj	Kranthi Krishna; Sreelu Dasari; Prudhvi Raj; Geetha Singh	Sri PR Movies	
J A N U A R Y	26	105 Minuttess	Raju Dussa	Hansika Motwani	Rudransh Celluloids	
J A N U A R Y	26	Before Marriage	A. Sreedhar Reddy	Bharath Bandaru; Naveena Reddy; Hima Sailaja	Hanuma Creations	
J A N U A R Y	26	Mudo Kannu	Surath Rambabu	P. Sai Kumar; Nirosha; Srinivasa Reddy	Seven Stars Creations Audience Pulse Entertainments	
J A N U A R Y	26	Premalo	Chandu Koduri	Chandu Koduri; Charishma Sreekar; Sivaji Raja	Dream Zone Pictures	
J A N U A R Y	26	Prema Yuddham	Syama Sundara Babu	Thagaram Siddardha; Roopika Apoorva Sagar; Suman	Shanmuka Production	
J A N U A R Y	26	RAM (Rapid Action Mission)	Mihiraam Vynatheya	Surya Ayyalasomayajulu; Dhanya Balakrishna; Bhanu Chander; P. Sai Kumar; Subhalekha Sudhakar	Deepika Entertainments	
F E B R U A R Y	2	Ambajipeta Marriage Band	Dushyanth Katikineni	Suhas; Sharanya Pradeep; Shivani Nagaram; Jagadeesh Prathap Bandari	GA2 Pictures	
F E B R U A R Y	2	Bootcut Balaraju	Sree Koneti	Syed Sohel Ryan; Megha Lekha; Sunil	Global Films; Katha Veruntadhi Productions	
F E B R U A R Y	2	Dheera	Vikranth Srinivas	Laksh Chadalavada; Soniya Bansal; Neha Pathan	Sri Tirumala Tirupati; Venkateswara Films	
F E B R U A R Y	2	Game On	Dayanandh	Geet Anand; Neha Solanki; Vasanthi Krishnan; Adithya Menon; Subhalekha Sudhakar	Kasturi Creations; Golden Wings Productions	
F E B R U A R Y	2	Happy Ending	Kowshik Bheemidi	Yash Puri; Apoorva Rao; Vishnu Oi; Ajay Ghosh; Jhansi	Hamstech Films; Silly Monks Studios	
F E B R U A R Y	2	I Hate You	Anji Ram	Karthik Raju; Mokksha; Sherry Agarwal; Priyanka Kholgade	Sri Gayathri Entertainments	
F E B R U A R Y	2	Kismat	Srinath Badineni	Naresh Agastya; Abhinav Gomatam; Vishwadev Rachakonda; Riya Suman; Srinivas Avasarala; Ajay Ghosh	Comrade Film Factory; Atheera Productions	
F E B R U A R Y	2	Mechanic	Muni Sahekara	Mani Sai Teja; Rekha Nirosha; Tanikella Bharani	Teenasree Creations	
F E B R U A R Y	8	Yatra 2	Mahi V. Raghav	Mammootty; Jiiva; Subhalekha Sudhakar; Mahesh Manjrekar	70mm Entertainments	
F E B R U A R Y	9	Eagle	Karthik Gattamneni	Ravi Teja; Anupama Parameswaran; Kavya Thapar; Navdeep; Madhoo; Srinivas Avasarala	People Media Factory	
F E B R U A R Y	14	Sheeshmahal	Camp Sasi	Rahul Ramakrishna; Camp Sasi; Rohit Penumatsa; Rahul Penumatsa	Avanti Chitranaalayam; Million Dreams Creations	
F E B R U A R Y	15	Raajadhani Files	Bhanu Shankar	Vinod Kumar Alva; Vani Viswanath; Akilan Pushparaj; Vishal Patni	TeluguOne Productions	
F E B R U A R Y	16	Bhamakalapam 2	Abhimanyu Tadimeti	Priyamani; Sharanya Pradeep; Raghu Mukherjee; Seerat Kapoor	Dream Farmers	
F E B R U A R Y	16	I Hate Love	Venkatesh Vipparthi	Subbu Mudhunuri; Seelam Srivalli; Ravi Mallidi	Ravi Art Productions	
F E B R U A R Y	16	Ooru Peru Bhairavakona	Vi Anand	Sundeep Kishan; Varsha Bollamma; Kavya Thapar; Vennela Kishore; Harsha Chemudu	AK Entertainments; Hasya Movies	
F E B R U A R Y	23	Ground	Suraj	Harinath Raj Kuntamukkula; Tejaswini Maragoni; Nagaraj Badhavath; Vasishta Kunde	Cinecode Studios	
F E B R U A R Y	23	Masthu Shades Unnai Raa	Thiru	Abhinav Gomatam; Vaishali; Nizhalgal Ravi; Moin; Ali Reza	Kasula Creative Works	
F E B R U A R Y	23	Mukhya Gamanika	Venu Muralidhar Vadnala	Viran Muttamsetty; Lavannya Sahukara; Aryan Ippili	Shivin Productions	
F E B R U A R Y	23	Premalo Iddaru	Mulagapaka Babu Rao	Veera Anjaneya Kumar; Divya Palem; Palasa Srinu	MBR Creations	
F E B R U A R Y	23	Siddharth Roy	V. Yeshasvi	Deepak Saroj; Tanvi Negi; Nandini Yallareddy	Shree Radha Damodar Studios; Vihaan & Vihin Creations	
F E B R U A R Y	23	Sundaram Master	Kalyan Santosh	Harsha Chemudu; Divya Sripada	RT Team Works; Goal Den Media	
F E B R U A R Y	23	Thappinchuku Thiruguvadu Dhanyudu Sumathi	Narayana Chenna	Priyadarshi Pulikonda; M. G. Shyam; Srinda; Manikandan R. Achari; Niranjana Anoop; Bhadram	BS Production House; Yellow Thoughts Creations; AR Talkies	
M A R C H	1	Bhoothaddam Bhaskar Narayana	Purushotham Raaj	Shiva Kandukuri; Rashi Singh; Arun Kumar; Devi Prasad	Million Dreams Creations; Vijaya Saraaga Productions	
M A R C H	1	Chaari 111	TG Keerthi Kumar	Vennela Kishore; Murali Sharma; Samyuktha Viswanathan	Barkat Studios	
M A R C H	1	Inti No. 13	Panna Royal	Naveed Babu; Shivangi Mehra; Anandaraj; Tanikella Bharani; Prudhvi Raj; Nellore Sudharshan	Regal Film Productions	
M A R C H	1	Maa Oori Raja Reddy	Ravi Basara	Nihan; Vaishnavi Kamble	RS Movie Makers	
M A R C H	1	Operation Valentine (Note: The film was produced in both the Telugu and Hindi languages, according to the filmmakers.)	Shakti Pratap Singh Hada	Varun Tej; Manushi Chhillar; Mir Sarwar	Sony Pictures Motion Picture Group; Renaissance Pictures; God Bless Entertainment	
M A R C H	1	Radha Madhavam	Eshaku Dasari	Vinayak Desai; Aparna Devi; Meka Ramakrishna	GVK Creations	
M A R C H	1	S-99	Jagan Mohan Chindam	Jagan Mohan Chindam; Swetaa Varma; Dayanand Reddy	Temple Media	
M A R C H	1	Vyuham	Ram Gopal Varma	Ajmal Ameer; Manasa Radhakrishnan; Dhanunjay Prabhune; Surabhi Prabhavati; Vasu Inturi	Ramadhuta Creations	
M A R C H	6	Valari	M Mrithika Santhoshini	Ritika Singh; Sriram; Uttej; Subbaraju		
M A R C H	8	Babu No.1 Bullshit Guy	Laxman Varma MLR	Arjun Kalyan; Laxman Varma MLR; Kushitha Kallapu; Sonali Panigre	DD Creations	
M A R C H	8	Bhimaa	Harsha	Gopichand; Priya Bhavani Shankar; Malvika Sharma; Nassar; Vennela Kishore; Naresh	Sri Sathya Sai Arts	
M A R C H	8	Bullet	Choudappa	Ravi Varma; Sanjana Singh; Alok Jain; Manisha Dev	Tummurakota Film Circuits	
M A R C H	8	Gaami	Vidyadhar Kagita	Vishwak Sen; Chandini Chowdary	V Celluloid; VR Global Media; Karthik Kult Kreations	
M A R C H	8	Record Break	Chadalavada Srinivasa Rao	Nihaar; Raghda Iftekhar; Satya Krishnan; Chalapathi Rao	Sri Tirumala Tirupathi Venkateswara Films	
M A R C H	8	Shapatham	Ram Gopal Varma	Ajmal Ameer; Manasa Radhakrishnan; Dhanunjay Prabhune; Surabhi Prabhavati; Vasu Inturi	Ramadhuta Creations	
M A R C H	8	We Love Bad Boys	Raju Rajendra Prasad	Ajay Kumar; Romika Sharma; Vamsi Yakasiri; Aditya Shashank Neeti; Roshni Sahota	Bm Creations	
M A R C H	9	Raju Gari Ammayi Naidu Gari Abbayi	Satya Raj	Ravi Teja Nunna; Neha Jurel; Nagineedu	Tanvika and Mokshika Creations	
M A R C H	15	Faction Leni Seema Katha	Vasu Pannuri	Ramu B; Vinay Thopuri; Khagendra Chitta	Puram Cinema	
M A R C H	15	Lambasingi – A Pure Love Story	Naveen Gandhi	Bharath Raj; Divi Vadthya	Concept Films	
M A R C H	15	Maya	Ramesh Nani	Ester Noronha; Suresh Kondeti	Vincloud Entertainments; Zero Productions	
M A R C H	15	Mix Up	Aakash Bikki	Kamal Kamaraju; Akshara Gowda; Aadarsh Balakrishna; Pooja Jhaveri	Sprint Films	
M A R C H	15	Ravikula Raghurama	Chandra Sekhar Kanuri	Gowtham Varma; Deepshika Umapathy	Positive Vibe Productions	
M A R C H	15	Razakar	Yata Satyanarayana	Raj Arjun; Bobby Simha; Tej Sapru; Makarand Deshpande; Vedhika; Anasuya Bharadwaj; Indraja	Samarveer Creations	
M A R C H	15	Sharathulu Varthisthai	Akshara	Chaitanya Rao; Bhoomi Shetty; Nanda Kishore; Bojjapalli Venkey	Starlight Studios	
M A R C H	15	Tantra	Srinivas Gopisetti	Ananya Nagalla; Dhanush Raghumudri; Saloni Aswani; Temper Vamsi; Meesala Lakshman	First Copy Movies; Be The Way Films; Vizag Film Factory	
M A R C H	15	Vey Dharuvey	Naveen Reddy	Sai Raam Shankar; Yasha Shivakumar; Sunil; Satyam Rajesh	Sai Teja Entertainments	
M A R C H	21	Haddhu Ledhu Raa	Rajashekkar Raavi	Ashish Gandhi; Hrithika; Varsha Viswanath; Tanikella Bharani; Rajeev Kanakala	Tiger Hills Production; Swarna Pictures	
M A R C H	22	Ananya	Prasad Raju Bommidi	Jairaman Jutthiga; Chandana Lopinti; Suman	Srii Siddi Dhatri Movie Creations	
M A R C H	22	Lineman	Raghu Shastry	Thrigun; Kaajal Kunder; B. Jayashree; Niviksha Naidu; Harini Srikanth	Purple Rock Entertainers	
M A R C H	22	Om Bheem Bush	Harsha Konuganti	Sree Vishnu; Rahul Ramakrishna; Priyadarshi	V Celluloid; VR Global Media	
M A R C H	22	Vande Bharat Save India	Mallam Ramesh	Suman; Kaushik Mekala; Ankitha Muler; Subbaraya Sarma; Jenny	Kalarathna Movies	
M A R C H	29	Agricos	Vaspula Narasimha	Dinil Rahul; Teena Sravya; Uttaradi Lokesh	Kalamitra Creations	
M A R C H	29	Kaliyugam Pattanamlo	Ramakhanth Reddy	Vishva Karthikeya; Aayushi Patell; Anish Kuruvilla; Chitra Shukla	Nani Movie Works; Raama Creations	
M A R C H	29	Thalakona	Nagesh Naradasi	Apsara Rani; Ajay Ghosh	Akshara Creations	
M A R C H	29	Tillu Square	Mallik Ram	Siddhu Jonnalagadda; Anupama Parameswaran	Sithara Entertainments; Fortune Four Cinemas	

== April–June ==
Opening		Title	Director	Cast	Production company	Ref.
A P R I L	5	Bahumukham	HarShiv Karthik	HarShiv Karthik; Swarnima Singh; Maria Martynova	Crystal Mountain Productions	
A P R I L	5	Bharathanatyam	KVR Mahendra	Surya Teja Aelay; Meenakshi Goswami; Viva Harsha; Harsha Vardhan; Ajay Ghosh; Mast Ali; Gangavva	PR Films	
A P R I L	5	The Family Star	Parasuram	Vijay Deverakonda; Mrunal Thakur	Sri Venkateswara Creations	
A P R I L	11	Geethanjali Malli Vachindi	Shiva Turlapati	Anjali; Srinivasa Reddy; Satyam Rajesh; Satya; Shakalaka Shankar; Sunil; Ali	MVV Cinema; Kona Film Corporation	
A P R I L	11	Sriranga Neethulu	Praveen Kumar VSS	Suhas; Ruhani Sharma; Karthik Rathnam; Viraj Ashwin	Radhavi Entertainments	
A P R I L	12	Mercy Killing	Venkatramana Surapalli	Parvateesam; P. Sai Kumar; Aishwarya Vullingala; Harika Pedada; Surya	Sai Siddhartha Movie Makers	
A P R I L	12	Roudra Roopaya Namaha	Palik	Baahubali Prabhakar; Mohana Siddi; Payel Mukherjee; Thagubothu Ramesh	Ravula Ramesh Creations	
A P R I L	18	Tenant	Y. Yugandhar	Satyam Rajesh; Megha Chowdhury; Chandana Payaavula; Aadukalam Naren; Ramya Kolthuri	Mahateja Creations	
A P R I L	19	Market Mahalakshmi	VS Mukkhesh	Parvateesam; Praneeka Anvikaa; Harsha Vardhan	B2P Studios	
A P R I L	19	My Dear Donga	B. S. Sarwagna Kumar	Abhinav Gomatam; Shalini Kondepudi; Divya Sripada; Nikhil Gajula	CAM Entertainment	
A P R I L	19	Paarijatha Parvam	Santosh Kambhampati	Sunil; Harsha Chemudu; Shraddha Das; Malavika Satheesan; Srikanth Iyengar; Chaitanya Rao Madadi	Vanamali Creations	
A P R I L	19	Sharapanjaram	Naveen Kumar Gattu	Naveen Kumar Gattu; Laya Kamboja; Rajamouli Jabardasth	Dosthan Films	
A P R I L	19	Theppa Samudram	Sateesh Rapolu	Chaitanya Rao; Arjun Ambati; Kishori Dhatrak; P. Ravi Shankar; Nirukanti Mani Charan	Srimani Entertainments	
A P R I L	26	Konchem Hatke	Avinash Kumar G	Guru Charan K.; Krishna Manjusha; Ishwarya Vullingala; Guru Venkatesh; Jalluri Sai; Vidya Sagar D	Abhimana Theatre Pictures	
A P R I L	26	Malle Mogga	Thota Nag	Ramtej Mummidi; Varshini Arja; Venna Mounika Reddy; Bhanuchander; Kota Shankar Rao; Pilla Prasad; Chatrapathi Sekhar	Hrithik Ram Productions	
A P R I L	26	Rudrakshapuram	RK Gandhi	Mani Sai Teja; Vaidurya; Rekha; Naga Mahesh; Veera Babu	Macvud Entertainments	
M A Y	3	Aa Okkati Adakku	Malli Ankam	Allari Naresh; Faria Abdullah; Vennela Kishore; Jamie Lever; Viva Harsha; Ariyana Glory	Chilaka Productions	
M A Y	3	Prasanna Vadanam	Arjun YK	Suhas; Payal Radhakrishna; Rashi Singh Nandu; Viva Harsha; Nitin Prasanna	Little Thoughts Cinemas	
M A Y	3	Sabari	Anil Katz	Varalaxmi Sarathkumar; Ganesh Venkatraman; Shashank; Mime Gopi; Sunaina	Maha Movies	
M A Y	3	The Indian Story	R Rajashekar Reddy	Raaj Bheemreddy; Zara Khan; Chammak Chandra; Mukhtar Khan; Ramaraju; Sameer; C. V. L. Narasimha Rao	The Bheemreddy Creations	
M A Y	10	Aarambham	Ajay Nag V	Mohan Bhagath; Supritha Sathyanarayan; Bhooshan Kalyan; Ravindra Vijay; Laxman Meesala; Bodepalli Abhishek; Surabhi Prabhavathi	AVT Entertainment	
M A Y	10	Brahmachari	Renigunta Narsing	Gunta Mallesham; Siri Ravulachari	Advitheeya Entertainers	
M A Y	10	Krishnamma	VV Gopala Krishna	Satya Dev; Athira Raji	Arunachala Creations	
M A Y	10	Laxmi Kataksham	Surya Yakkalooru	Sai Kumar; Vinay Panigrahi; Deepti Varma; Charisma Sreeker	Mahathi Entertainment	
M A Y	10	Prathinidhi 2	Murthy Devagupthapu	Nara Rohit; Jisshu Sengupta; Siri Lella; Sachin Khedekar; Tanikella Bharani; Dinesh Tej	Vanara Entertainments; Rana Arts	
M A Y	17	Akkada Varu Ikkada Unnaru	Trivikram Rao Kundurthi	Jagadesh Raj; Sai Harshini; Karanam Eswar; Pantula Lalitha; KV Ramana; Vattipalli Shavran; Kadiyala Manjula	Sai Vijki Cinema	
M A Y	17	Darshini	Pradeep Allu	Vikas Kanaka; Pappala Shanthi Priya; Bisetty Kodanda Nagesh; Somayajula Venkata Satya Prasad; Kallempudi Vahini	V4 Cine Creations	
M A Y	17	Nata Ratnalu	Narra Shiva Nagu	Sudharshan Reddy; Inaya Sulthana; Mahesh Achanta; Thagubothu Ramesh; Suman Setty; Archana Shastry	Everest Entertainments	
M A Y	17	Vidya Vasula Aham	Manikanth Gelli	Shivani Rajashekar; Rahul Vijay; Srinivas Avasarala; Abhinaya; Srinivasa Reddy	Eternity Entertainment; Thanvika Jashwika Creations	
M A Y	24	Big Brother	Subbarao Gosangi	Siva Kantamaneni; Sri Surya; Pakhi Hegde; Preeti Shukla; Gautam Raju; Gundu Sudarshan	Lighthouse Cine Magic	
M A Y	24	C.D (Criminal or Devil)	Krishna Annam	Adah Sharma; Viswant Duddumpudi; Jabardasth Rohini; Bharani Shankar; Ramana Bhargav; Mahesh Vitta	SSCM Productions	
M A Y	24	Dirty Fellow	Adari Murthy Sai	Santhi Chandra; Deepika Singh; Simrithi Bathija; Nikkesha Rangwala; Nagineedu; Satya Prakash	Raj India Entertainments	
M A Y	24	Raju Yadav	Krishnamachary	Getup Srinu; Ankita Kharat; Chakrapani Ananda; Rocket Raghava; Mirchi Hemanth; Jabardasth Sunny	Sai Varunavi Creations; Charisma Dreams Entertainment	
M A Y	24	Silk Saree	T. Nagendar	Vasudev Rao; Reeva Chaudhary; Preeti Goswami; Omkarnath Srisailam; Kotesh Manava	Chahat Productions	
M A Y	24	Van	Dadi Lokesh	Magesh; Amrutha Sree; Madhava Rao	Sri Chandra Rupa Movie Makers	
M A Y	25	Love Me	Arun Bhimavarapu	Ashish Reddy; Vaishnavi Chaitanya	Dil Raju Productions	
M A Y	31	Bhaje Vaayu Vegam	Prashanth Reddy	Kartikeya Gummakonda; Ishwarya Menon; Tanikella Bharani	UV Concepts	
M A Y	31	Gam Gam Ganesha	Uday Bomisetty	Anand Deverakonda; Pragati Shrivastava; Nayan Sarika; Raj Arjun; Satyam Rajesh; Vennela Kishore	Hy-Life Entertainment	
M A Y	31	Gangs of Godavari	Krishna Chaithanya	Vishwak Sen; Neha Shetty; Nassar; Anjali; Hyper Aadi; P. Sai Kumar; Praveen	Sithara Entertainments; Fortune Four Cinemas	
J U N E	7	Gold Number 1	Bodapati Krishna	Gopikrishna Kunapali; Adhiti Nanda; Jampanna Bodapati	Sri Laxmi Samakka Creations	
J U N E	7	Manamey	Sriram Adittya	Sharwanand; Krithi Shetty	People Media Factory	
J U N E	7	Namo	Aditya Reddy Kunduru	Viswant Duddumpudi; Vismaya Sri; Anuroop Katari; Virendra Chauhan; Mayanand Thakur; Meka Ramakrishna; Srinivas Bogireddy; Vadlamani Srinivas	Sri Nethra Creations; Aarms Film Factory	
J U N E	7	OC	Vishnu Bompally	Harish Bompally; Maanya Saladi; Roiel Shree; Lakshmi Kiran	Koundinya Productions	
J U N E	7	Preminchoddu	Shirin Sriram	Anurup Reddy; Sarika Boga; Deva Malishetty; Yashwanth Pendyala; Manasa Eddla	Shirin Sriram Cafe	
J U N E	7	Rakshana	Prandeep Thakore	Payal Rajput; Maanas Nagulapalli; Rajeev Kanakala; Chakrapani Ananda	Hari Priya Creations	
J U N E	7	Satyabhama	Suman Chikkala	Kajal Aggarwal; Naveen Chandra; Prakash Raj; Nagineedu; Harsha Vardhan; Ravi Varma	Aurum Arts	
J U N E	8	Tom and Jerry	Jai Sree Sivan	Amlan Das; Harman Deep Kaur; Chandra Mahesh; Thota Venugopal; Ravi Teja Nannimala	Sri Kamala Movies	
J U N E	13	Rush	Satish Poloju	Daisy Bopanna; Karthik Ahuti		
J U N E	14	Dear Nanna	Anji Saladhi	Chaitanya Rao Madadi; Surya Kumar Bhagavandas	Black Pepper Cinemas	
J U N E	14	Harom Hara	Gnanasagar Dwaraka	Sudheer Babu; Malvika Sharma; Sunil; Jayaprakash	Sree Subramanyeshwara Cinemas	
J U N E	14	Indrani	Stephen Pallam	Yaaneea Bharadwaj; Kabir Duhan Singh; Ajay; Ankita; Shataf Figar	Shray Motion Pictures	
J U N E	14	Music Shop Murthy	Siva Paladugu	Ajay Ghosh; Chandini Chowdary	Fly High Cinemas	
J U N E	14	Nee Dhaarey Nee Katha	Vamsi Jonnalgadda	Priyatham Maanthini; Vijay Vikranth; Ananth Padasola; Anjana Balaji; Ved Reddy	JV Productions	
J U N E	14	Yevam	Prakash Dantuluri	Chandini Chowdary; Vasishta N. Simha; Jai Bharat Raj; Ashu Reddy	CSpace; Prakash Dantuluri Productions	
J U N E	21	Anthima Theerpu	A Abhiramu	Sai Dhanshika; Vimala Raman; Ganesh Venkatraman; Amit Tiwari	Sri Siddi Vinayaka Movie Makers	
J U N E	21	Honeymoon Express	Bala Rajasekharuni	Chaitanya Rao; Hebah Patel; Suhasini; Tanikella Bharani; Ali; Surekha Vani; Ravi Varma	NRI Entertainments; A New Reel India Entertainments Production	
J U N E	21	Itlu...Mee Cinema	Harish Chava	Abhiram Krishna; Pavan Manohar; Vennela	Little Baby's Creations	
J U N E	21	Nindha	Rajesh Jagannadham	Varun Sandesh; Tanikella Bharani; Annie Zibi; Bhadram; Surya Kumar Bhagvandas	The Fervent Indie Productions	
J U N E	21	OMG: O Manchi Ghost	Shankar K. Marthand	Vennela Kishore; Nandita Swetha; Shakalaka Shankar; Navami Gayak; Rajath Raghav; Naveen Neni	Markset Networks Productions	
J U N E	21	Padmavyuham lo Chakradhaari	Sanjay Reddy Bangarapu	Praveen Rajkumar; Shashika Tickoo; Ashu Reddy; Madhunandan; Dhanraj	VC Creations	
J U N E	21	Prabhutva Juniour Kalasala	Sreenath Pulakuram	Pranav Preetham; Shagnasri Venun; Sri Munichandra; Mandapeta Mallika Jagula	Black Ant Pictures; Sreenath Pulakuram Cinemas	
J U N E	21	Seetha Kalyana Vaibhogame	Satish Paramaveda	Suman Tej; Garima Chouhan; Sivaji Raja; Nagineedu; Gagaan Vihari; Venky Monkey	Dream Gate Productions	
J U N E	22	Sandeham	Satish Paramveda	Suman Tej; Hebah Patel; Swetha Varma; Subhashree Rayaguru	Vishnu Varshini Creations	
J U N E	27	Kalki 2898 AD	Nag Ashwin	Amitabh Bachchan; Kamal Haasan; Prabhas; Deepika Padukone; Disha Patani	Vyjayanthi Movies	
J U N E	30	Aham Reboot	Prashanth Sagar Atluri	Sumanth	Vayuputra Entertainments	

== July–September ==
Opening		Title	Director	Cast	Production company	Ref.
J U L Y	5	14	Dangeti Lakshmi Srinivas	Noel Sean; Vishakha Dhiman; Ram Rathan Reddy; Posani Krishna Murali; Srikanth Iyengar	Royal Pictures	
J U L Y	7	Love Mouli	Avaneendra	Navdeep; Pankhuri Gidwani; Charvi Dutta	Cspace; Nyra Creations; Srikara Studios	
J U L Y	12	Sarangadhariya	Padmarao Abbisetti	Raja Ravindra; Mohi Shm; Mohit Pedada; Yashaswini Srinivas; Shivakumar Ramachandravarapu; Neela Priya Devulapalli	Saija Creations	
J U L Y	19	Crime Reel	Sanjana Anne	Bharat Kumar; Siri Chowdary; Abhinaya Krishna; Ping Pong Surya; Acharya Krishna	Anne Creations	
J U L Y	19	Darling	Aswin Raam	Priyadarshi; Nabha Natesh; Ananya Nagalla; Brahmanandam	Primeshow Entertainment	
J U L Y	19	Just a Minute	Poorna's Yaswanth	Abhishiek Pachipala; Jabardasth Phani; Naziya Khan	Redswan Entertainment	
J U L Y	19	Pekamedalu	Neelagiri Mamilla	Vinoth Kishan; Anoosha Krishna	Crazy Ants Productions	
J U L Y	19	The Birthday Boy	Whisky Dasari	Ravi Krishna; Sameer Malla; Rajeev Kanakala; Pramodini Pammi	Bomma Borusa Productions	
J U L Y	26	Operation Raavan	Venkata Satya	Rakshit Atluri; Sangeerthana Vipin; Raghu Kunche; Radhika Sarathkumar	Sudhas Media	
J U L Y	26	Purushothamudu	Ram Bhimana	Raj Tarun; Hassini Sudhir; Prakash Raj; Ramya Krishna; Brahmanandam; Murali Sharma	Shree Sridevi Productions	
J U L Y	26	Ram NRI	N. Laxmi Nanda	Ali Reza; Sitanarayanan	SMK Films	
A U G U S T	1	Shivam Bhaje	Apsar	Ashwin Babu; Digangana Suryavanshi	Ganga Entertainments	
A U G U S T	2	Alanaati Ramchandrudu	Chilukuri Akash Reddy	Krishna Vamsi; Mokksha	Hyniva Creations	
A U G U S T	2	Average Student Nani	Pawan Kumar. K	Pawan Kumar. K; Sahiba Basin; Sneha Malviya; Rajiv Kanakala	Sri Neelakanta Mahadeva Entertainments	
A U G U S T	2	Buddy	Sam Anton	Allu Sirish; Ajmal Ameer; Prisha Rajesh Singh	Studio Green Films	
A U G U S T	2	Lorry Chapter – 1	Sreekanth Reddy Asam	Sreekanth Reddy Asam; Chandrashikha; Rockey Sing; Geetha Bhosle	King Maker Pictures	
A U G U S T	2	Tiragabadara Saami	Ravi Kumar Chowdary	Raj Tarun; Malvi Malhotra; Mannara Chopra; Makarand Deshpande	Suraksh Entertainments	
A U G U S T	2	Usha Parinayam	K. Vijaya Bhaskar	Sree Kamal; Tanvi Akaanksha; Surya Srinivas; Sivaji Raja; Ali; Vennela Kishore	Vijaya Bhaskar Kraft	
A U G U S T	2	Viraaji	Adhyanth Harsha	Varun Sandesh; Raghu Karumanchi; Pramodini	M3 Media; Maha Movies	
A U G U S T	9	Bhavanam	Balachari Kurella	Saptagiri; Shakalaka Shankar; Thagubothu Ramesh; Bithiri Sathi; Ajay	Super Good Films	
A U G U S T	9	Case No. 15	Rajesh Tadakala	Ajay; Ravi Prakash; Harshini Kodur; Chitram Srinu; Tadakala Vankar Rajesh	BG Ventures	
A U G U S T	9	Committee Kurrollu	Yadhu Vamsi	Sandeep Saroj; Yashwanth; Eshwar Trinath Varma	Pink Elephant Pictures; Shree Radha Damodar Studios	
A U G U S T	9	Land Mafia	Velpula Nimma Babu	Pranaya Nadha Kunam; Lakshmi Madhubala	PNC Films	
A U G U S T	9	Paagal vs Kadal	Rajesh Mudunuri	Vijay Shankar Paddana; Vishika Keerthi; Brahmaji; Shakalaka Shankar; Prashanth Kuchibotla; Anuhya Saripalli; Aadvik Bandaru	Sivatri Films	
A U G U S T	9	Sangharshana	Chinna Venkatesh	Chaitanya Pasupuleti; Shiva Ramachandravarapu; Rasheeda Bhanu	Mahindra Pictures	
A U G U S T	9	Simbaa	Murali Mohanar Reddy	Jagapathi Babu; Anasuya Bharadwaj; Srinath Maganti; Vasishta N. Simha; Anish Kuruvilla; Gautami	Sampath Nandi Team Works; Raj Dasari Productions	
A U G U S T	14	Veeranjaneyulu Viharayatra	Anurag Palutla	Naresh; Sri Lakshmi; Rag Mayur; Priya Vadlamani	Dream Farmers	
A U G U S T	15	Double iSmart	Puri Jagannadh	Ram Pothineni; Sanjay Dutt	Puri Connects	
A U G U S T	15	EVOL	Ram Yogi Velagapudi	Shivakumar Ramachandravarapu; Surya Srinivas; Jenifer Emmanuel; Divya Sharma	Theda Batch Cinema	
A U G U S T	15	Mr. Bachchan	Harish Shankar	Ravi Teja; Bhagyashri Borse; Jagapathi Babu; Sachin Khedekar	People Media Factory	
A U G U S T	16	Aay	Anji K Maniputhra	Narne Nithiin; Nayan Sarika; Ankith Koyya; Rajkumar Kasireddy	GA2 Pictures	
A U G U S T	22	Parakramam	Bandi Saroj Kumar	Bandi Saroj Kumar; Sruthi Samanvi; Naga Lakshmi Yellagula; Nikhil Gopu; Mohan Senapati	BSK Mainstream	
A U G U S T	23	Brahmmavaram P.S. Paridhilo	Imran Sastry	Sravanthi Bellamkonda; Guru; Surya Srinivas; Jeeva	Dreamz On Reelz Entertainment	
A U G U S T	23	Maruthi Nagar Subramanyam	Lakshman Karya	Rao Ramesh; Ankith Koyya; Indraja; Ramya Pasupuleti; Harsha Vardhan	PBR Cinemas; Lokamaatre Cinematics	
A U G U S T	23	Revu	Harinath Puli	Vamsi Ram Pendyala; Swathi Bheemireddy; Ajay Nidadavolu	Samhith Entertainments; Parupalli Productions	
A U G U S T	23	R. K. Puramlo?	Srikar Prasad Katta	Ravi Kiran Gubbala; Trishala Indnani; Raksha Gowda	Pavan Deepika Arts	
A U G U S T	23	Wedding Diaries	Venkataramana Midde	Arjun Ambati; Chandini Tamilarasan	MVR Studios	
A U G U S T	23	Yagna	Chittajallu Prasad	Pradeep Reddy; Siva Naidu; Goa Jyoti; Suman Shetty; Jabardasth Apparao; Chitti Babu	RR Movie Creations; Renuka Ellamma Films	
A U G U S T	29	Saripodhaa Sanivaaram	Vivek Athreya	Nani; S. J. Suryah; Priyanka Mohan	DVV Entertainments	
A U G U S T	29	Kaalam Raasina Kathalu	MNV Sagar	MNV Sagar; Viharika Chowdary; Haanvika Srinivas; Shruthi Shankar; Santhosh Sridhar	SM4 Films	
A U G U S T	30	Aho Vikramaarka	Peta Trikoti	Dev Gill; Pravin Tarde; Chitra Shukla; Tejaswini Pandit	Dev Gill Productions	
A U G U S T	30	Kaveri	Rajesh Nellore	Shaik AllaBakashu; Faizel Ahmed; Rishita Nellore; Khushi Yadav; Gujjala Sudheer Reddy; Prashanth Kumar Reddy Duvvuru	SAB Creations	
A U G U S T	30	Nenu-Keerthana	Chimata Ramesh Babu	Chimata Ramesh Babu; Risitha Nellore; Meghana Vadeghar; Shruthi Shankar; Sandhya Kundena; Renu Priya; Jeeva	Chimata Productions	
A U G U S T	30	Seetharam Sitralu	D. Naga Sasidhar Reddy	Lakshmana Murthy Ratana; Akella Raghavendra; Sandeep Varanasi; Bramarambika Tutika; Kishori Dhatrak	Raising Hands Productions	
A U G U S T	30	SI Kodandapani	Makka Srinu	Makka Srinu; Surekha Rathod; Dil Ramesh	Sai Hanuman Movie Makers	
S E P T E M B E R	6	35 Chinna Katha Kaadu	Nanda Kishore Emani	Nivetha Thomas; Arundev Pothula; Vishwadev Rachakonda; Priyadarshi	Suresh Productions; Waltair Productions; S Originals	
S E P T E M B E R	6	Speed 220	Harsha Bejagam	Ganesh Kolla; Hemanth Reddy Mallidi; Preetei Sundar Kumar Bajrang; Jahnavi Sharma; Mahendranath Thtikonda; Chakrapani Ananda	Vijayalakshmi Productions	
S E P T E M B E R	7	Uruku Patela	Vivek Reddy	Tejus Kancherla; Khushboo Choudary; Goparaju Ramana; Chakrapani Ananda; Uma Maheshwar Rao Inabathi	Lead Edge Pictures	
S E P T E M B E R	13	Bhale Unnade	J Sivasai Vardhan	Raj Tarun; Manisha Kandkur; Singeetam Srinivasa Rao; Abhirami Gopikumar; VTV Ganesh; Hyper Aadi	Ravi Kiran Arts; Maruti Team	
S E P T E M B E R	13	Kalinga	Dhruva Vaayu	Dhruva Vaayu; Pragya Nayan; Aadukalam Naren; Laxman Meesala; Tanikella Bharani	Big Hit Productions	
S E P T E M B E R	13	Mathu Vadalara 2	Ritesh Rana	Sri Simha Koduri; Satya; Vennela Kishore; Sunil; Faria Abdullah	Clap Entertainment; Mythri Movie Makers	
S E P T E M B E R	13	Utsavam	Arjun Sai	Dilip Prakash; Regina Cassandra; Rajendra Prasad; Prakash Raj; Brahmanandam	Hornbill Pictures	
S E P T E M B E R	14	LifeStories	Ujjwal Kashyap	Satya Kethineedi; Shalini Kondepudi; Deviyani Sharma; M. Vivan Jain; Lakshmi Sunkara; Raju Gollapall	ACZUN Entertainment; Planet Green Studios	
S E P T E M B E R	20	100 Crores	Virat Chakravarthy	Chetan Kumar; Rahul Haridas; Amy Aela; Sakshi Chaudhary; Aishwarya Raj Bhakuni; Anthra Raut; Sameer Hasan	SS Studioss	
S E P T E M B E R	20	Gorre Puranam	Bobby Varma	Suhas; Posani Krishna Murali; Raghu Karumanchi	Focal Cinemas	
S E P T E M B E R	20	Hide N Seek	Basireddy Rana	Viswant Duddumpudi; Shilpa Manjunath; Rhea Sachdeva; Tejaswini Naidu; Sumanth Verella	Sahasra Entertainments	
S E P T E M B E R	20	Manyam Dheerudu	Naresh Dekkala	RVV Satyanarayana; R Parvathi Devi; R Pavan Ram Kumar; Jabardasth Appa Rao; Peela Sattipandu	RVV Movies	
S E P T E M B E R	20	Pailam Pilaga	Anand Gurram	Sai Teja Kalvakota; Pavani Karanam; Mirchi Kiran; Dubbing Janaki	Happy Horse Films	
S E P T E M B E R	27	Devara: Part 1	Koratala Siva	N. T. Rama Rao Jr.; Saif Ali Khan; Janhvi Kapoor; Prakash Raj	N. T. R. Arts; Yuvasudha Arts	

== October–December ==
Opening		Title	Director	Cast	Production company	Ref.
O C T O B E R	3	Chitti Potti	Bhaskar Yadav Dasari	Ram Mittakanti; Pavithra Anand; Akkala Kashvi	Bhaskar Group of Media	
O C T O B E R	4	Bahirbhoomi	Ramprasad Konduru	Noel Sean; Rishita Nellore; Garima Singh Satendra; Chitram Srinu; Jabardasth Phani	Mahakali Productions	
O C T O B E R	4	Balu Gani Talkies	Vishwanath Prathap	Shivakumar Ramachandravarapu; Saranya Sharma; Raghu Kunche	Aha	
O C T O B E R	4	Dhakshina	Osho Tulasiram	Sai Dhanshika; Rishav Basu; Sneha Singh; Karuna Bhushan; Meghana Chowdary	Cult Concepts	
O C T O B E R	4	Kali	Siva Sashu	Prince Cecil; Naresh Agastya; Neha Krishnan; Gautam Raju; Gundu Sudarshan	Rudra Creations	
O C T O B E R	4	Mr. Celebrity	Chandina Ravi Kishore	Varalaxmi Sarathkumar; Sudarshan Paruchuri; Sri Deeksha; Nassar; Raghu Babu; Saptagiri	RP Cinemas	
O C T O B E R	4	Ramnagar Bunny	Srinivas Mahath	Chandrahass; Richa Joshi; Vismaya Sri; Ambika Vani; Rithu Manthra	Sri Sumanohara Productions	
O C T O B E R	4	Swag	Hasith Goli	Sree Vishnu; Ritu Varma; Meera Jasmine; Daksha Nagarkar; Sunil; Ravi Babu; Getup Srinu	People Media Factory	
O C T O B E R	11	Maa Nanna Superhero	Abhilash Reddy	Sudheer Babu; Sai Chand; Sayaji Shinde	V Celluloids	
O C T O B E R	11	Viswam	Srinu Vaitla	Gopichand; Kavya Thapar; Vennela Kishore; Sunil; Naresh	Chitralayam Studios; People Media Factory	
O C T O B E R	12	Janaka Aithe Ganaka	Sandeep Reddy Bandla	Suhas; Sangeerthana Vipin; Vennela Kishore; Goparaju Ramana; Rajendra Prasad	Dil Raju Productions	
O C T O B E R	18	1980 Lo Radhekrishna	Ismail Shaik	SS Saidulu; Bramarambika Tutika; Arpitha Lohi	SV Creations	
O C T O B E R	18	Kallu Compound 1995	Praveen Jetti	Ganesh DS; Ayeshee Patel; Praveen Jetti; Jeeva; Posani Krishna Murali	Bluehorizon Moviefactory	
O C T O B E R	18	Love Reddy	Smaran Reddy	Anjan Ramachendra; Shravani Krishnaveni	Seheri Studio; MGR Films; Geethansh Productions	
O C T O B E R	18	Rewind	Kalyan Chakravarthy	Sai Ronak; Amrutha Chowdary	Krosswire Kreations	
O C T O B E R	18	The Deal	Hanu Kotla	Hanu Kotla; Sai Chandana; Dharani Priya; Ravi Prakash; Raghu Kunche	Citadel Creations; DigiQuest	
O C T O B E R	18	Veekshanam	Manoj Palleti	Ram Karthik; Kashvi	Padmanabha Cine Arts	
O C T O B E R	25	C202	Munna Kasi	Munna Kasi; Sharon Riya Fernandez; Tanikella Bharani; Chitram Srinu; Satya Prakash; Subhalekha Sudhakar	Mighty Oak Pictures	
O C T O B E R	25	Gangster	Chandrasekhar Rathod	Chandrasekhar Rathod; Kashvi Kanchan; Abhinav Janak; Adla Satish; Suryanarayana	Wild Warrior Productions	
O C T O B E R	25	Laggam	Ramesh Cheppala	Sai Ronak; Pragya Nagra; Rajendra Prasad; Rohini	Subishi Entertainments	
O C T O B E R	25	Narudi Brathuku Natana	Rishikeshwar Yogi	Shivakumar Ramachandravarapu; Nithin Prasanna; Shruthie Jayan	People Media Factory	
O C T O B E R	25	Pottel	Sahit Mothkuri	Ananya Nagalla; Ajay; Noel Sean; Srikanth Iyengar; Chatrapathi Sekhar	Prangnya Sannidhi Creations	
O C T O B E R	25	Samudrudu	Nagesh Naradasi	Ramakanth Badavath; Bhanu Sri; Avanthika Munni	Keerthana Productions	
O C T O B E R	25	Yentha Panichesav Chanti	Uday Kumar Ryali	Srinivas Ulisetti; Diya Raj; Shanthi Priya; Niharika Keshav	PJK Movie Creations	
O C T O B E R	31	KA	Sujith; Sandeep	Kiran Abbavaram; Nayan Sarika; Tanvi Ram; Achyuth Kumar; Redin Kingsley	Srichakraas Entertainments	
O C T O B E R	31	Lucky Baskhar	Venky Atluri	Dulquer Salmaan; Meenakshi Chaudhary	Sithara Entertainments; Fortune Four Cinemas	
N O V E M B E R	8	Appudo Ippudo Eppudo	Sudheer Varma	Nikhil Siddhartha; Rukmini Vasanth; Divyansha Kaushik; Harsha Chemudu	Sri Venkateswara Cine Chitra	
N O V E M B E R	8	Dhoom Dhaam	Macha Saikishor	Chetan Krishna; Hebah Patel; Sai Kumar; Vennela Kishore; Vinay Varma	Friday Frameworks	
N O V E M B E R	8	Ee Saraina	Viplav	Viplav; Ashwini Ayaluru; Karthikeya Dev; Nithu Supraja	Reading Films	
N O V E M B E R	8	Jathara	Sathish Babu Ratakonda	Sathish Babu Ratakonda; Vishva Karthikeya; Deeya Raj	Radha Krishna Production	
N O V E M B E R	8	Jewel Thief	P. S. Narayana	Krishna Sai Makineni; Meenakshi Jaiswal; Prema; Ajay; Prudhvi Raj	MSK Pramidha Shree Films	
N O V E M B E R	8	Jithender Reddy	Virinchi Varma	Rakesh Varre; Vaishali Raj; Riya Suman; Subbaraju; Ravi Prakash	Muduganti Creations	
N O V E M B E R	8	Rahasyam Idam Jagath	Komal R Bharadwaj	Rakesh Galebhe; Sravanthi Prattipati; Manasa Veena; Bhargav Gopinatham; Kartheek Kandala	Single Cell Universe	
N O V E M B E R	8	The Shortcut	Ramakrishna Kanchi	Aata Sandeep; Shagna Sri Venun; Balveer Singh	DL Entertainments	
N O V E M B E R	8	Vanchana	Umamahesh Marpu	Umamahesh Marpu; Sony Reddy; Surya Kumar Bhagvandas; RK Naidu; Diwakar Vankayala	Chandi Durga Entertainments	
N O V E M B E R	14	Matka	Karuna Kumar	Varun Tej; Meenakshi Chaudhary; Nora Fatehi; Naveen Chandra; Ajay Ghosh	Vyra Entertainments; SRT Entertainments	
N O V E M B E R	22	Cinema Pichodu	Kumar Swamy	Kumar Swamy; Savithri Krishna; Jyothi Chowdary; Joshith Yenneti; Kittayya S	Yenneti Entertainments	
N O V E M B E R	22	Devaki Nandana Vasudeva	Arjun Jandyala	Ashok Galla; Manasa Varanasi; Devdatta Nage	Lalithambika Productions	
N O V E M B E R	22	Kalama E Kannillenduke	Kotha Parsharamulu	Vijay Babu Jarabala; Varenya Karan	Kotha Cinema Creations	
N O V E M B E R	22	Kanakamahalakshmi	Kamalakar Rao Ponnapalli	Subha Rajeswari; Kiran Nukireddy; Anil Neredimil; Aravinda Agarwal	Sri Priya International	
N O V E M B E R	22	Keshava Chandra Ramavath	Garudavega Anji	Rocking Rakesh; Annanya Krishnan; Tanikella Bharani; Dhanraj; Lohit Kumar	Green Tree Productions; Vibudhi Creations; Garudavega Makings	
N O V E M B E R	22	Mechanic Rocky	Ravi Teja Mullapudi	Vishwak Sen; Shraddha Srinath; Meenakshi Chaudhary; Sunil; Naresh	SRT Entertainments	
N O V E M B E R	22	Zebra	Eashvar Karthic	Satyadev; Dhananjaya; Priya Bhavani Shankar; Satya Akkala; Sathyaraj	Old Town Pictures; Padmaja Films	
N O V E M B E R	28	Roti Kapda Romance	Vikram Reddy	Harsha Narra; Sandeep Saroj; Supraj Ranga; Tarun Ponugoti; Sonu Thakur; Nuveksha; Megha Lekha; Khushboo Chaudhary	Lucky Media; Meraki Films	
D E C E M B E R	5	Pushpa 2: The Rule	Sukumar	Allu Arjun; Fahadh Faasil; Rashmika Mandanna	Mythri Movie Makers	
D E C E M B E R	13	Pranaya Godari	PL Vignesh	Sadan Hasan; Priyanka Prasad; Sai Kumar; Prudhvi Raj	PLV Creations	
D E C E M B E R	14	Fear	Haritha Gogineni	Vedhika; Arvind Krishna; Sahithi Dasari	Dattatreya Media	
D E C E M B E R	14	Samidha	Satheesh Malempati	Aditya Shashikumar; Lavannya Sahukara; Chandini Tamilarasan	Arunam Films	
D E C E M B E R	19	Leela Vinodham	Pavan Sunkara	Shanmukh Jaswanth; Anagha Ajith; Goparaju Ramana; Aamani; Rupa Lakshmi	Sri Akkiyan Arts	
D E C E M B E R	20	Bachchala Malli	Subbu Mangadevi	Allari Naresh; Amritha Aiyer; Rohini; Rao Ramesh; Achyuth Kumar	Hasya Movies	
D E C E M B E R	25	Srikakulam Sherlock Holmes	Writer Mohan	Vennela Kishore; Ananya Nagalla; Siya Gowtam; Ravi Teja Mahadasyam; Muralidhar Goud; Anish Kuruvilla	Sri Ganapathi Cinemas	
D E C E M B E R	27	Drinker Sai	Kiran Tirumalasetti	Dharma; Aishwarya Sharma; Posani Krishna Murali; Srikanth Iyengar	Everest Cinemas; Smart Screens Entertainments	

== Highest grossing film of each month ==
Highest monthwise gross of 2024
Rank	Month	Title	Production company	Worldwide gross	Ref	Verdict
1	January					
2	February					
3	March					
4	April					
5	May					

== See also ==
- Lists of Telugu-language films
- List of Telugu films of 2023
- List of Telugu films of 2025
