= C 202 =

C 202 may refer to:

- Macchi C.202 Folgore
- C 202 (film)
