= Mowgli (2025 film) =

2025 Indian Telugu film by Sandeep Raj

- Theatrical release poster
- Directed by: Sandeep Raj
- Written by: Sandeep Raj
- Produced by: T. G. Vishwa Prasad; Krithi Prasad
- Starring: Roshan Kanakala; Sakkshi Mhadolkar; Bandi Saroj Kumar
- Cinematography: Rama Maruti M.
- Edited by: Kodati Pavan Kalyan
- Music by: Kaala Bhairava
- Production company: People Media Factory
- Release date: 13 December 2025
- Running time: 160 minutes
- Country: India
- Language: Telugu

Mowgli is a 2025 Indian Telugu-language romantic action film written and directed by Sandeep Raj. The film stars Roshan Karthik Kanakala, Sakkshi Mhadolkar and Bandi Saroj Kumar in important roles.

The film was released on 13 December 2025.

== Cast ==
- Roshan Karthik Kanakala as Murali Krishna "Kittu" alias "Mowgli"
- Sakkshi Mhadolkar as Varsha alias Jasmine
- Bandi Saroj Kumar as Christopher Nolan
- Krishna Bhagavan as John, Prabhas Bunty's father
- Harsha Chemudu as Prabhas Bunty
- Ramana Bhargava as Ranga Babai
- Vara Kodali
- Mounika Reddy as Varsha's friend
- Aaryan Ajay as Director of a film (cameo appearance)
- Srinivas Avasarala as Raju, Varsha's father (special appearance)
- Riya Suman as Mallika Nayak (special appearance)
- Suhas as Jayakrishna alias Kittu (cameo appearance)

== Music ==
The background score and songs were composed by Kaala Bhairava.

Track listing
No.	Title	Lyrics	Singer(s)	Length
1.	"Sayyare"	Chandrabose	Kaala Bhairava, Aishwarya Daruri	5:57
2.	"Vanavaasam"	Kalyan Chakravarthy	Kaala Bhairava, Sony Komanduri	4:52
3.	"Veeranjaneya"	Amith	Angat Bhushan	5:33

== Release and reception ==
Mowgli was initially scheduled to release on 12 December 2025, but was released on 13 December 2025.

Srivathsan Nadadhur of The Hindu appreciated Saroj Kumar's performance while being critical towards overall writing. OTTPlay too echoed the same and rated it 2 out of 5. BH Harsh of Cinema Express too gave the same rating and wrote that, "Mowgli goes for intense payoff moments without building the stakes prior to it. This is precisely why the film’s attempts to channel the mythological symbols fall flat".
