= Porkkalam =

- Directed by: Bandi Saroj Kumar
- Written by: Bandi Saroj Kumar
- Produced by: D. Bhaskara Rao
- Starring: Kishore; Tinnu Anand; Sathyan; Sampath Raj; Smitha; Lal; Biju Menon; Santhana Bharathi; Ponvannan
- Cinematography: Bandi Saroj Kumar
- Edited by: Bandi Saroj Kumar
- Music by: Rohit Kulkarni
- Distributed by: Mannan Films
- Release date: 14 January 2010
- Country: India
- Language: Tamil

Porkkalam (transl. Battlefield) is a 2010 Indian Tamil-language action film written and directed by debutant Bandi Saroj Kumar. Starring Kishore, Tinnu Anand, Sathyan and Smitha, a newcomer from Karnataka, in lead roles and seven artists as villains, the film has musical score by Rohit Kulkarni. The film was released on 14 January 2010.

== Cast ==
- Kishore as Karnan
- Tinnu Anand as Bhismaki
- Sathyan as Sathya
- Smitha as Sneha
- Lal as Aslam Bhai
- Sampath Raj as Dhronam Raju
- Biju Menon as Inspector Rangasamy
- Santhana Bharathi
- Ponvannan as Pasupathy
- Rajesh as Karnan's Father
- Atheesh as Obulage
- Srinivasan
- Joe Anthony
- Santhoshi as Karnan's mother

== Production ==
The first schedule was shot in late 2008 in various places in Tamil Nadu including Dhanushkodi, Madurai, Tenkasi, Thiruchendur, Karaikudi and Rameswaram. Following this, the film's second schedule was shot from 13 October 2008 to 26 November 2008 in the parts of Chennai and Puducherry and in the Ramoji Film City, in Hyderabad, while in January 2009, the third and last schedule was shot in several places in Thailand. The film was also heavily publicized through the internet prior through release, on social networking sites.

== Soundtrack ==
Porkkalam

Soundtrack album by Rohit Kulkarni
- Released: 3 November 2009
- Recorded: 2009
- Genre: Feature film soundtrack
- Label: Capital Film Works
- Producer: Rohit Kulkarni

Rohit Kulkarni chronology
Porkkalam (2009)	'Ammavin Kaipesi' (2012)

Film score and the soundtrack are composed by Rohit Kulkarni, despite early indications that Yuvan Shankar Raja would compose the music. The songs were released straight to the shelves, with the album containing several debutant singers.

Track listing
No.	Title	Singer(s)	Length
1.	"Aran Thiran"	KK (singer)
2.	"Indha Bhoomyil"	Nisha	5:19
3.	"Porkkalam Theme"	Nisha, Candy, Mimosa
4.	"Unnale"	S. P. B. Charan
5.	"Yaaro Ivan Yaaro"	Karthik, Carolisa Monteiro

== Release and reception ==
The film was released on 14 January 2010 on Pongal. Baradwaj Rangan of The Hindu wrote,"In Porkalam, the first-time director Bandi Saroj Kumar takes the visual-narrative to a wholly different level, in the sense that this is a film that might actually have worked without dialogue." Rediff wrote "If only Bandi Saroj Kumar had cut through the slo-mo, added a fitzy villain and reworked half his movie, then Porkkalam would have been brilliant. As it is, this battlefield is a dud".
