= Gedela Raju Kakinada Taluka =

2026 Indian Telugu film by Chaitanya Moturi

- Theatrical release poster
- Directed by: Chaitanya Moturi
- Written by: Chaitanya Moturi
- Screenplay by: Chaitanya Moturi
- Story by: Chaitanya Motiri
- Produced by: Vani Ravikumar Moturi
- Starring: Raghu Kunche; Chinnibilli Ravianand; Vikas Muppala; Teena Sravya
- Edited by: Sudheer Yedla
- Music by: Raghu Kunche
- Production companies: Moturi Talkies, Saayamkaalam sitraalu productions
- Distributed by: Mythri Movie Distributors LLP
- Release date: 24 April 2026
- Running time: 121 minutes
- Country: India
- Language: Telugu

Gedela Raju Kakinada Taluka is a 2026 Indian Telugu-language crime drama film written and directed by Chaitanya Moturi. The film features Raghu Kunche,Ravi Anand Chinnibilli,Vikas Muppala, and Teena Sravya in important roles.

The film was released on 24 April 2026.

== Cast ==
- Raghu Kunche as Gedela Raju
- Ravi Anand Chinnibilli as sivayya
- Vikas Muppala as Rich
- Teena Sravya Kundoju as Sathya
- Ramachandram Punyamanthula as Vijay
- Mounika Kalapala as Meera
- Srikanth Iyengar as Durga
- Divya as CI
- Kittayya
- Jabardasth Bhasha
- Pullayya Pantulu Mylavarapu as PRO

== Music ==
The soundtrack and background score were composed by Raghu Kunche.

Track listing
No.	Title	Lyrics	Singer(s)	Length
1.	"Yem Cheymantave"	Giridhar Ragolu	Raghu Kunche	5:05
2.	"Yaragalla Boochodu"	Giridhar Ragolu	Baby Pasala	3:24
3.	"Rajo Maa Rajaa"	Lalitha Kantharao	K Manga Devi	3:50

== Release and reception ==
Gedela Raju Kakinada Taluka was released in theaters on 24 April 2026.

Sanjana Pulugurtha of The Times of India rated the film 3 out of 5 and praised Raghu Kunche's performance while stating that, "a tighter screenplay could have sharpened the impact further". Suresh Kavirayani of Cinema Express noted the performances of Raghu Kunche and Ravi Anand Chinnibilli and gave a rating of 2.5 out of 5. He further stated that the film "manages to hold its core suspense till the end. However, the non-linear and inconsistent screenplay works against it".
