= Asthamanam =

2012 Indian film by Bandi Saroj Kumar

- Theatrical release poster
- Directed by: Bandi Saroj Kumar
- Written by: Bandi Saroj Kumar
- Produced by: C. Sudhir Reddy; S. Siva Rajasekhar
- Starring: Rajesh IS; Rajesh Kanagasabai; Sharan; Victoria; Sri Vidya; Raghu
- Cinematography: Bandi Saroj Kumar
- Edited by: Bandi Saroj Kumar
- Music by: Siddharth Vipin
- Production company: a Char Production
- Release date: 6 April 2012
- Running time: 90 minutes
- Country: India
- Language: Tamil

Asthamanam (transl. Sunset) is a 2012 Indian Tamil-language thriller film directed by Bandi Saroj Kumar and jointly produced by C. Sudhir Reddy and S. Siva Rajasekhar. The film stars six newcomers: Rajesh IS, Rajesh Kanagasabai, Sharan, Victoria, Sri Vidya, and Raghu in the lead roles, while Munnar Ramesh plays a pivotal supporting role. The film released on 6 April 2012.

== Cast ==
- Rajesh IS as Karna
- Rajesh Kanagasabai as Raju
- Sharan as Rudra
- Victoria as Sneha
- Sri Vidya as Priya
- Munnar Ramesh as Guide

== Production ==
The film is based on a nightmare that the director had. It was shot in forest locations in Talakona and Tada.

== Reception ==
A critic from The Times of India wrote that "In his sophomore effort, Saroj displays the same visual bravado that characterized his debut film. In fact, characters are bludgeoned to death with an instrument that seems to have been borrowed from the props of his previous film". On the contrary, a critic from The New Indian Express opined that "At just a crisp 90 minutes of viewing time, 'Asthamanam' is an experiment worth a watch".
