= Noel Sean =

Indian rapper, composer and film actor (born 1982)

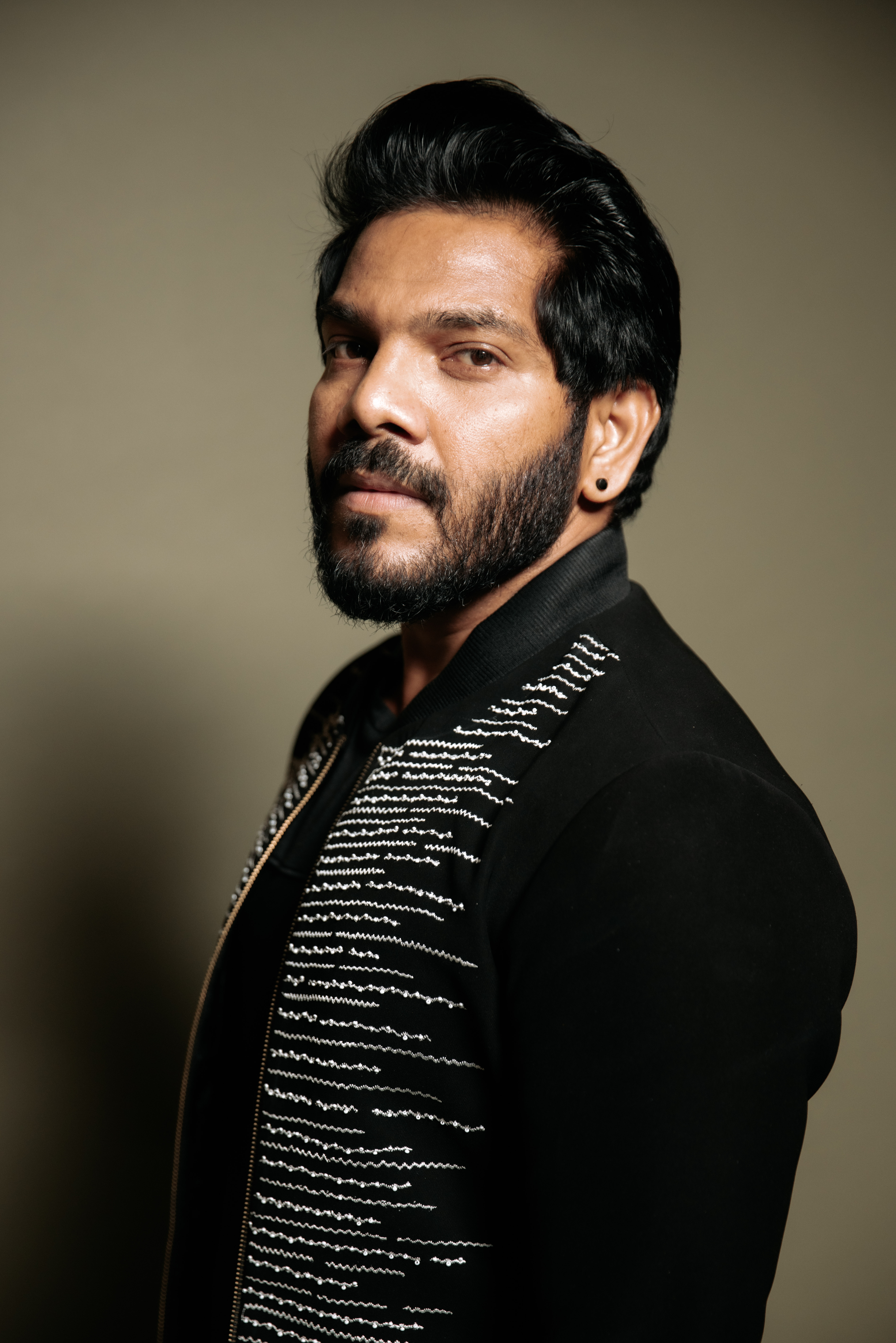
- Noel in 2024

Background information
- Born: 28 November 1982 (age 43); Hyderabad, Andhra Pradesh, India (now in Telangana, India)
- Genres: Rapping, Hip hop music, Indie music
- Occupations: Rapper; actor; singer; Radio Jockey
- Instrument: Vocals
- Years active: 2006–present
- Spouse: Ester Noronha (m. 2019; div. 2020)

Noel Sean (born 28 November 1982) is an Indian rapper and actor working in the Telugu cinema and Telugu music. An actor, music producer, television host, Radio Jockey, lyricist and composer. In 2020, he participated in a Telugu reality TV show Bigg Boss 4 as contestant.

== Early and personal life ==
Noel was born on 28 November 1982 in Hyderabad to Samuel and Sarah. He has three siblings. Noel went on to pursue the Bachelor of Fine arts in SVCFA and became a web designer successfully. He worked for Cognizant as a trainee until he joined the film industry. Noel married Indian actress Ester Noronha in January 2019 after being engaged for a year. On 31 October 2020, they made it public on social media that they had been officially divorced after being separated for a year.

== Career ==
He made his first appearance on screen in Sambhavami Yuge Yuge, during which he met Krishna, who later introduced Noel to the music director M. M. Keeravani. The latter gave him the first break as a Rapper in the Telugu movie Vikramarkudu directed by S. S. Rajamouli.

In 2007, he appeared with Charmy Kaur in Mantra.

In 2015, he played Kumari 21F (the role of Shankar, the antagonist). He was debuted the lead actor in Naanna Nenu Naa Boyfriends opposite Hebah Patel. In 2020 Sean participated in the Telugu reality TV show Bigg Boss 4 hosted by Nagarjuna.

=== Music ===
Noel has produced several independent songs and released them on his official YouTube channel. He collaborated with lyricist Ananta Sriram and singers Ramya Behara.

== Filmography ==
Key
†	Denotes films that have not yet been released

Year	Title	Role	Notes
2006	Sambhavami Yuge Yuge	Teasing Rapper	
2006	Veedhi		
2007	Mantra	Rapper	
2008	Nenu Meeku Telusa	Adithya's friend	
2009	Indumathi	Sheshi	
2009	Sasirekha Parinayam		
2009	Magadheera	Jayram	
2009	Pravarakhyudu		
2012	Eega	Nani's friend	
2012	Rey		
2015	Ladies & Gentlemen	Himself	Special appearance
2015	Gaddam Gang	Dharmaraju's son	
2015	Kumari 21F	Shankar	
2015	Nannaku Prematho	Noel	
2016	Guppedantha Prema	Abhi	
2016	Premam	Arjun	
2016	Nanna Nenu Naa Boyfriends	Gokul	
2017	Raja Meeru Keka	Shashank	
2018	Rangasthalam	Erra Srinu	
2018	Vijetha	Ram's friend	
2018	Hello Guru Prema Kosame	Karthik	
2018	Padi Padi Leche Manasu	Shravan	
2018	Enduko Emo		
2020	Valayam	Siddharth aka Chinna	
2021	Money She	Chandu	
2022	Godse	Raghava	
2023	Rangabali	College Senior	
2024	14	Surya	
2024	Bahirbhoomi	Krishna	
2024	Pottel		

=== Television ===
Year	Title	Role	Network	Ref(s)
2010	Sa Re Ga Ma Pa Telugu L'il Champs	Host	Gemini TV	
2013	Super Kutumbam	Host	Gemini TV	
2016	Cash S1	Participant	ETV	
2018	Tollywood Squares	Contestant	Star Maa	Episode 24
2019	Bigg Boss 3	Guest	Star Maa	
2020	Bigg Boss 4	Contestant	Star Maa	
2020	Bigg Boss Buzzz	Guest	Star Maa Music	
2021	Game	Rahul	Hungama	1 season, 6 episodes
2023	Kumari Srimathi	Nani's colleague	Amazon Prime Video	
2025	Bigg Boss 9	Guest	Star Maa	

== Discography ==
=== Film songs ===
- Vikramarkudu - 2006
- Chandamama - 2007
- Mantra - 2007
- Victory - 2008
- Andamaina Manasulo - 2008
- Vishaka Express - 2008
- Krishnarjuna - 2008
- Premabhishekam - 2008
- Kadhalna Summa Illai - 2009 (Tamil)
- Indumathi - 2009
- Life Style - 2009
- Ooha Chitram - 2009
- Seetharamula Kalyanam - 2010
- Rama Rama Krishna Krishna - 2010
- Andari Bandhuvaya - 2010
- Aha Naa Pellanta - 2011
- Babloo - 2011
- Vykuntapali - 2011
- Lovely - 2012
- All The Best - 2012
- Poola Rangadu - 2012
- Disco - 2012
- Gaddam Gang - 2015
- Rey - 2015
- Krishnashtami - 2016
- O Manasa - 2016
- Jai Simha - 2018

=== Non-film songs ===
Year	Song
2011	BGOTN (Christian Devotional Album)
2014	Luv Fever (single)
2015	Baahubali tribute song
2015	Baha Kiliki (Featuring Smita)
2016	Bhimavaram Beat (single)
2016	Maayee (single)
2016	Bum Chiki Bum Bum (Kumari 21F Tribute)
2016	Happy Mother's Day Mommy (single)
2016	Maakkikirkiri (Featuring Rahul Sipligunj)
2016	Salaam India (by The Shake Group)
2016	Dabbulu Chalatle (by The Shake Group)
2018	Despacito Telugu Cover (Single featuring Ester Noronha)
2018	Despacito Konkani Cover (Featuring Ester Noronha)
2019	Baby (Featuring Ester Noronha)
2020	Delivery Boy Telugu Rap Song
2020	Hustler Telugu Rap Song
2021	Marade Marade Telugu Song
2021	Echipaadd (Featuring Alekhya Harika)
2023	Jai Balayya Cult Fan Anthem
2023	Thandri Deva Christian Devotional Song
2023	Kraisthava Christian Devotional Song
2025	OG x Masaka Masaka (Featuring Smita)
