= Balu Gani Talkies =

2024 Indian Telugu-language film by Viswanath Pratap

- Release poster
- Directed by: Viswanath Pratap
- Screenplay by: Ashwith Gautam; Viswanath Pratap
- Story by: Viswanath Pratap
- Produced by: Sreenidhi Sagar
- Starring: Shivakumar Ramachandravarapu; Saranya Sharma
- Cinematography: Balu Sandilyasa
- Edited by: Anwar ali
- Music by: Score; Aditya B.N; Songs; Smaran
- Distributed by: Aha
- Release date: 4 October 2024
- Running time: 122 minutes
- Country: India
- Language: Telugu

Balu Gani Talkies is a 2024 Indian Telugu-language comedy thriller film co-written and directed by Viswanath Pratap. The film stars Shiva Ramachandra Varapu and Saranya Sharma in the lead roles.

The film was released on Aha on 4 October 2024.

== Plot ==
The story is set in a small village and follows Balu, a passionate fan of Nandamuri Balakrishna. Balu owns an old cinema theater that has seen better days and has been reduced to screening adult films to survive. Balu dreams of reviving his theater's glory by screening a Balakrishna film, but his journey is fraught with obstacles. The film explores Balu's struggles and the lengths he goes to in order to fulfill his dream. The narrative emphasizes the impact of cinema on rural communities and the challenges faced by small theater owners.

== Cast ==
- Shivakumar Ramachandravarapu as Balaraju "Balu"
- Saranya Sharma as Sasi
- Raghu Kunche as Chennakesavulu
- Vishvanath Sharma
- Sudhakar Reddy
- Vamsi Nekkanti
- Suresh Pujari
- Kethiri Sudhakar Reddy

== Release ==
Balu Gani Talkies was originally scheduled to be released on Aha on 13 September 2024, but was ultimately released on 4 October 2024.

== Reception ==
Swaroop Kodur of The Hollywood Reporter India gave a positive review saying, "Balu Gani Talkies is an amusing watch because it is self-aware and contained to a good measure" and appreciating Viswanath Pratap's work. Having a similar opinion, Ravi Prakash of The Hans India stated, "Vishwanath Prathap's direction and writing are strong points in Balu Gani Talkies".
