= Deenamma Jeevitham =

Indian film

- Theatrical release poster
- Directed by: Muorali Ramaswamy
- Written by: Muorali Ramaswamy
- Produced by: Yalla Murali Krishna
- Starring: Dev Ballani; Priya Chohan; Saritha Chohan
- Cinematography: Satish Kumar Kare
- Edited by: Jhony Basha Shaik
- Music by: Ram Sam
- Production companies: Durgasree Films; Yashwanth Raamaswamy Creations
- Distributed by: SKML Motion Pictures
- Release date: 5 January 2024
- Country: India
- Language: Telugu

Deenamma Jeevitham is a 2024 Indian Telugu-language film written and directed by Muorali Ramaswamy. The film stars Dev Ballani and Priya Chohan in the lead roles. The film was produced by Yalla Murali Krishna.

== Cast ==
- Dev Ballani as Krishna
- Priya Chohan as Radha
- Saritha Chohan as Mahima
- Shannu Shaik as Shannu
- Balagam Sahadev as Babu Broker

== Production ==
The film trailer was released on 29 December 2023.

== Reception ==
A critic from News18 gave two point seven five out of five and noted that "A realistic drama that will appeal to the youth". Sakshi (newspaper) gave two point two five out of five and gave a mixed review.
