= LifeStories =

Indian drama film

- Theatrical release poster
- Directed by: Ujjwal Kashyap
- Written by: Ujjwal Kashyap
- Produced by: Ujjwal Pasnur and MM Vijaya Jyothi
- Starring: Satya Kethineedi, Deviyani Sharma, Rajsekhar Aningi, Lakshmi sunkara, Raju Gollapalli, Shalini Kondepudi, Gowtham Rao
- Cinematography: Pranav Ananda
- Edited by: Surya Vinay
- Music by: Vinod Kumar (Vinnu)
- Production companies: ACZUN Entertainment and Planet Green Studios
- Release date: 14 September 2024
- Running time: 104 minutes
- Country: India
- Language: Telugu

#LifeStories is a 2024 Indian Telugu-language drama film written and directed by Ujjwal Kashyap. The film is produced by Ujjwal Pasnur and MM Vijaya Jyothi under ACZUN Entertainment. The film premiered on 14 September 2024.

The film has Satya Kethineedi, Deviyani Sharma, Rajsekhar Aningi, Lakshmi Sunkara, Raju Gollapalli, Shalini Kondepudi, Gowtham Rao and Pradeep Raparthi in main cast. The film's score is composed by Vinod Kumar (Vinnu), while the cinematography is executed by Pranav Ananda.

== Plot ==
The film begins in a software development office. A software employee schedules a cab, commencing a journey that interweaves with five supplementary narratives. A narrative explores a wife's difficulties in celebrating New Year's Eve with her spouse while working in a software firm. Another narrative depicts how a dog becomes a companion to a reclusive woman, Mangamma. The third narrative focuses on the relationship between two old companions. It also illustrates the difficulties encountered by a schoolboy while separated from his mother. Themes such as companionship, joy, camaraderie, loneliness, and unconditional love are intricately interwoven into these works.

== Cast ==
- Satya Kethineedi as Piyush
- Deviyani Sharma as Swetha
- Rajsekhar Aningi as Rajini
- Lakshmi sunkara as Mangamma
- Raju Gollapalli as Murali
- Harry as Bangaram
- Shalini kondepudi as Shreya
- Pradeep Raparthi as Mangesh
- Mohan Rao Bagwat as Mohan
- Gowtham Rao as Gowtham
- Vivan Jain as Kaustubh
- Venkatesh Mamidala as seenu
- Rahul as Jaleel Pasha
