= Nenu-Keerthana =

Indian Telugu language film

- Promotional release poster
- Directed by: Chimata Ramesh Babu
- Written by: Chimata Ramesh Babu
- Produced by: Chimata Lakshmi Kumari
- Starring: Chimata Ramesh Babu; Rishitha; Meghana; Jeeva; Vijay Rangaraju; Manjunath
- Cinematography: K. Ramana
- Edited by: Vinay Reddy Bandarapu
- Music by: M. L. Raja
- Production company: Chimata Productions
- Distributed by: Chimata Jyothirmaye USA
- Release date: 30 August 2024
- Country: India
- Language: Telugu

Nenu-Keerthana is a 2026 Indian Telugu language film multi-genre film written and directed by Chimata Ramesh Babu (CHR). Produced by Chimata Lakshmi Kumari under the banner Chimata productions, the movie is presented by Chimata Jyothirmaye - USA. the movie stars Chimata Ramesh Babu, Rishitha, and Meghana in lead roles. The cinematography was by K Ramana, music was by M. L. Raja, and editing was by Vinay Reddy Bandarapu.

== Plot ==
Johnny (Ramesh Babu) is always ready to help anyone who is in trouble. But while helping people who are in trouble, he has made some enemies on the way. In this process, one day a young woman named Keerthana comes into his life. And along with her, he also attains a God's gift. How Johnny has used the gift to help others rather than helping himself, and how Keerthana's entry into his life has changed his life is the story.

== Cast ==
- Chimata Ramesh Babu
- Rishitha
- Meghana
- Jeeva
- Vijay Rangaraju
- Manjunath
- Renu Priya
- Jabardasth Sunny
- Jabardasth Appa Rao
- Sandhya

== Music ==
Nenu Keerthana

Film score by M. L. Raja
- Released: 10 June 2024
- Genre: Feature film soundtrack
- Length: 12:07
- Language: Telugu

The music and background score was composed by M. L. Raja.

The film's first song 'Seetha Kokai Egirindhi Manase' was released on 10 June 2024. The song 'Konchem Konchem Gudu Gudu Gunjam' was released on 22 June 2024. The song 'Manasaiyyindhi Nee Paina' was released on 6 July 2024.

| No. | Title | Lyrics | Singer(s) | Length |
|---|---|---|---|---|
| 1. | "Konchem Konchem Gudu Gudu Gunjam" | Anchula Nageswar Rao, Chimata Ramesh Babu (CHR) | Hari Gunta, Lasya Priya | 3:28 |
| 2. | "Seethakokai Egirindhi Manase" | Sriramulu | Hari Gunta, Srividhya Malahari | 4:31 |
| 3. | "Manasaiyyindhi Nee Paina" | Anchula Nageswar Rao, Chimata Ramesh Babu | Hari Gunta, Lasya Priya | 4:08 |
| Total length: | | | | 12:07 |

== Release ==
The movie teaser was released on 4 April 2024. The movie trailer was released on 9 August 2024. 'Nenu Keerthana' movie was theatrically released on 30 August 2024.

== Reception ==
A reviewer from 10tv.in reviewed the film and stated that the twists in the film are impressive, but some parts of the film feel dragged a bit. Even though the comedy is average, the action sequences were designed to entertain the mass audience.

A reviewer from Sakshi.com stated about the film that the film has been promoted as a multi-genre film, and it really has wide range of emotions like love, sentiment, action, romance, family drama, comedy, revenge, and horror in balanced way. Even though it felt a bit unnecessary to include so many genres in a small film, but felt that the story needed them.
