= Raghu Kunche =

Indian singer and composer

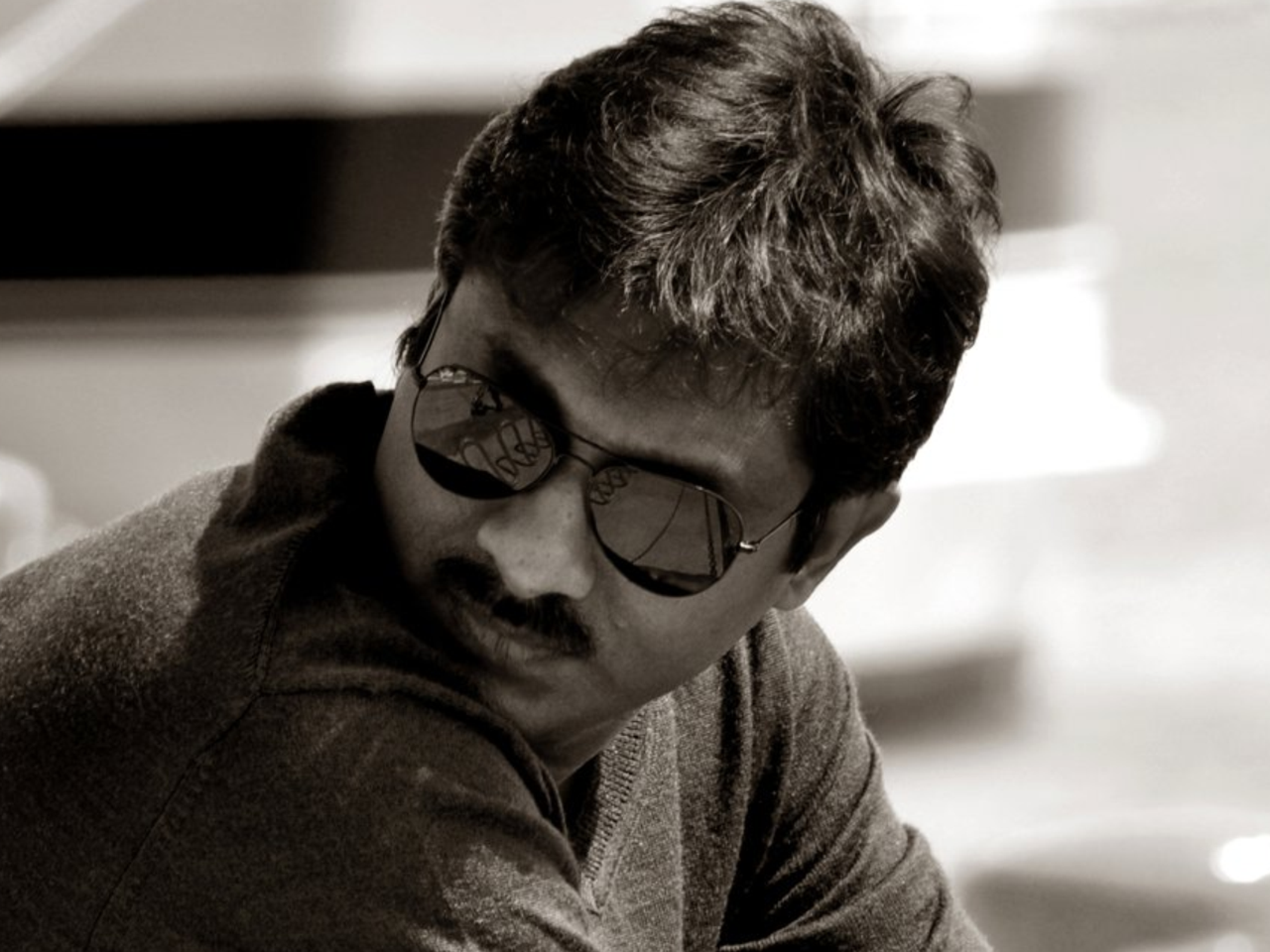
- Raghu Kunche

Background information
- Born: 13 June
- Origin: Rajamahendravaram, Andhra Pradesh, India
- Occupations: Music composer, producer, singer, actor, voice actor
- Years active: 2000–present

Raghu Kunche is an Indian music composer, singer and actor who works in Telugu films and television shows. He is a recipient of five Nandi Awards.

== Career ==
Raghu Kunche is an Indian music director, playback singer, actor, movie producer, voice actor, and television presenter who primarily works in Telugu cinema. He began his singing career in 2000 with the film Bachi and has since recorded many songs for Telugu films. Kunche made his debut as a music director with the 2009 film Bumper Offer, which received both commercial success and critical acclaim.

Over the course of his career, he has received six Nandi Awards in various categories, including music composition, playback singing, acting, voice acting, and television anchoring. Before establishing himself in the music industry, Kunche worked as a television anchor and Voice actor .

In recent years, he has also gained recognition as a lead actor, portraying a variety of roles including hero, villain, and character roles in Telugu cinema.

== Discography ==
=== Music composer ===
Year	Title	Language	Notes
2009	Bumper Offer	Telugu	
2011	Aha Naa Pellanta	Telugu	
2011	Daggaraga Dooramga	Telugu	
2012	Devudu Chesina Manushulu	Telugu	
2015	Ladies & Gentlemen	Telugu	
2015	Dongaata	Telugu	1 song only
2015	Mama Manchu Alludu Kanchu	Telugu	1 song only
2016	Viraat	Kannada	
2016	Nayaki	Telugu	Songs only
2016	Nayagi	Tamil	Songs only
2017	C/O Godavari	Telugu	
2018	47 Days	Telugu	Also producer
2019	Raagala 24 Gantallo	Telugu	
2020	Palasa 1978	Telugu	
2021	Crazy Uncles	Telugu	
2022	Batch	Telugu	
2022	Niku Naku Pellanta Tom Tom Tom	Telugu	
2024	We Love Bad Boys	Telugu	
2026	Gedela Raju Kakinada Taluka	Telugu	

=== Singer ===
Year	Work	Song	Composer	Notes
2000	Bachi	"Lachmi Lachmi"	Chakri	
2001	Mrugaraju	"Hangama Hangama"	Mani Sharma	
2002	Idiot	"Jai Veeranjaneya"	Chakri	
2005	Pandemkodi (D)	Vonivesina Deepavali	Yuvan Shankar Raja	
2007	Desamuduru	"Golapetti"	Chakri	
2008	Neninthe	"Oh I Miss You"	Chakri	
2009	Bumper Offer	"Yenduke Ravanamma"	Himself	
2010	Maryada Ramanna	Raye Raye	M. M. Keeravani	
2011	Aha Naa Pellanta	"Chinukularali"	Himself	
2011	Daggaraga Dooramga	"Manasu Manasu Mari Daggaraga"	Himself	
2012	Devudu Chesina manushulu	"Subba Lakshmi" "Devuda Devuda"	Himself	
2014	Sikander (D)	"Ek Do Teen Char"	Yuvan Shankar Raja	
2014	Chikkadu Dorakadu (D)	"Neelo Gundala"	Santhosh Narayanan	
2015	Ladies and Gentlemen	"Social Network Andi Babu"	Himself	
2015	Ladies and Gentlemen	"First Time Ammaayi Palakarimputho"	Himself	
2015	Mama Manchu Alludu Kanchu	"Tingu Tingu Rangadu"	Achu Rajamani	
2016	Viraat	"Gandasu Safety Pin"	Himself	Kannada film
2019	Ragala 24 Gantallo	"Rebba Isha Rebba"	Himself	
2020	47 Days	"Kanupapale"	Himself	
2020	Palasa 1978	"Nakkileesu Golusu"	Himself	
2022	Madhi	"Sirimallave DJ"	P.V.R. Raja	
2024	Harom Hara	"Murugudi Maaya"	Chaitan Bharadwaj	
2025	Mad Square	"Balugani Intilona"	Bheems Ceciroleo	

== Filmography ==
=== Film ===
Year	Title	Role	Notes
2000	Bachi	Raghu	
2000	Nuvvu Vasthavani	Raghu	
2001	Itlu Sravani Subramanyam		
2002	Holi	Sekhar	
2002	Adrustam	Groom	
2015	Ladies & Gentlemen	Himself	Special appearance; also music director
2015	Ouija	Dheeraj	Kannada film
2020	Palasa 1978	Gurumurthy	
2020	Disco Raja	Cameo	
2021	Kshana Kshanam		
2021	Guduputani		
2022	Maa Nanna Naxalite	Kondarudra Seetharamayya	Lead role
2022	Rudraveena	Lalappa	
2022	Bomma Blockbuster	Nagabhushanm	
2023	Hidimba	Duryodhan	
2024	Krishnamma	ACP Vijay Kumar	
2024	Operation Raavan		
2024	Balu Gani Talkies	Chennakesavulu	
2025	Sri Sri Sri Raja Vaaru	D'Souza	
2026	Devagudi		
2026	Gedela Raju Kakinada Taluka	Gedela Raju	

=== Television ===
Year	Title	Role	Network
2000	Santhi Nivasam		ETV
	Yours Lovingly	Presenter	
	Post Box No 1562	Presenter	
	Navaragam	Presenter	
	Antyakshari	Presenter	
	Sanghu Bhala	Presenter	
	Aataina Patina	Presenter	
2023	Super Singer	Mentor/Judge	Star Maa
2023	Dhootha	Chakravarthy Veerula	Amazon Prime Video
2025	Vikkatakavi	Raghupathi	ZEE5
2026	Veerabhadruni Rahasyam	Yoganandam	

=== Dubbing artist ===
- Ori Nee Prema Bangaram Kaanu (2003) for Rajesh Krishnan

== Awards and nominations ==
He has won five Nandi Awards as an actor, singer, music director, a dubbing artist and an anchor.

Other awards for films:

- 2009 - Santhosham Best playback singer Award for Nenithe
- 2010- Ap State Govt Nandi award for Best Music director - Bumper Offer
- 2010 - Mirchi Music Awards South for Best Upcoming Music Director - BUMPER OFFER
- 2010 - Big fm - Best upcoming Music director for Bumper Offer
- 2010 - Santhosham - best Music Director award for Bumper Offer
- 2010 - Cine Goers - Best Music director For Bumper Offer
- 2015 - Nominated - IIFA Award for Best Music Director - Telugu - Dongaata
- 2021 - Nominated - SIIMA Award for Best Male Playback Singer - Telugu - Palasa 1978
- 2021 - Mirchi Music awards - for Best music Director - Palasa 1978
- 2021 - Santhosham - Music Director Award for Palasa 1978
