= Kaalam Raasina Kathalu =

Indian romantic drama film

- Theatrical release poster
- Directed by: MNV Sagar
- Written by: MNV Sagar
- Starring: MNV Sagar, Viharika Chowdary, Haanvika Srinivas, Shruthi Shankar, Vikas Nelli
- Cinematography: S.Prasad
- Edited by: J.Prasad
- Music by: Armaan Merugu
- Release date: 29 August 2024
- Running time: 132 minutes
- Country: India
- Language: Telugu

Kaalam Raasina Kathalu (transl. Stories written by time) is a 2024 Indian Telugu language Romantic drama directed and produced by MNV Sagar.

The film starring MNV Sagar, Viharika Chowdary, Haanvika Srinivas, Shruthi Shankar, Santhosh Sridhar, Vikas Nelli and Rohith Konda are in lead roles.

Kaalam Raasina Kathalu was released on 29 August 2024. The music of the film is composed by Armaan Merugu.

== Plot ==
Kaalam Raasina Kathalu is a comprehensive rural youth love and family entertaining drama that takes place in a village setting. Spanning over a period of 60 years, this narrative delves into the enduring connections formed via reincarnation that go beyond the realms of love, friendship, and family relationships. It explores the themes of unjust associations, dishonesty, and the willingness to make sacrifices. The main character traverses across lives that have been impacted by three decades of premature deaths, while also playing a crucial and influential part. Every story depicted in the film conveys important moral lessons.

== Cast ==
- MNV Sagar as Local Srinu
- Viharika Chowdary as Janaki
- Haanvika Srinivas as Navya
- Shruthi Shankar as Meenakshi
- Santhosh Sridhar as Subbu
- Vikas Nelli as Sriram
- Rohith Konda as Mahesh
- Uma Recharla as Radha
