= Bandi Saroj Kumar =

Indian actor and director

- Born: 13 November 1984 (age 41); Andhra Pradesh, India
- Occupations: Actor, director
- Years active: 2010–present

Bandi Saroj Kumar (born 13 November 1989) is an Indian actor and filmmaker who predominantly works in Telugu cinema.

== Early life and career ==
Bandi Saroj Kumar was born on 13 November 1989 in East Godavari district, Andhra Pradesh, India. He started his career as a director in 2010 with Porkkalam. His other films include Asthamanam (2012) and Mangalyam (2022).

== Filmography ==
Key
†	Denotes films that have not yet been released

=== As director ===
Year	Title	Credited as					Language	Ref.
Year	Title	Director	Writer	Producer	Cinematographer	Editor	Language	Ref.
2010	Porkkalam	Yes	Yes	No	Yes	Yes	Tamil	
2012	Asthamanam	Yes	Yes	No	Yes	Yes	Tamil	
2020	Nirbhandam	Yes	Yes	Yes	Yes	Yes	Telugu	
2021	Nirbandham 2	Yes	Yes	Yes	Yes	Yes	Telugu	
2021	Suryasthamayam	Yes	Yes	No	Yes	Yes	Telugu	
2022	Mangalyam	Yes	Yes	Yes	Yes	Yes	Telugu	
2024	Parakramam	Yes	Yes	Yes	No	Yes	Telugu	

=== As actor ===
Year	Title	Role	Language	Ref.				
Year	Title	Role	Language	Ref.	2020	Nirbhandam	Ranjith	Telugu
2021	Nirbandham 2						Ranjith	Telugu
2021	Suryasthamayam						Ranjith	Telugu
2022	Mangalyam	Dorababu						Telugu
2024	Parakramam	Satti Babu / Lovaraju						Telugu
2025	Mowgli	Christopher Nolan						Telugu

== Discography ==
=== As composer ===
Year	Title	Language	Ref.			
Year	Title	Language	Ref.	2020	Nirbhandam	Telugu
2021	Nirbandham 2					Telugu
2021	Suryasthamayam					Telugu
2022	Mangalyam					Telugu
2024	Parakramam					Telugu
