= Munna Kasi =

- Born: Munna Kasi; Visakhapatnam, India
- Genres: Film score
- Occupations: Music Composer; Film Director; Actor
- Years active: 2011–present

Munna Kasi, also known as Venkata Surya Narayana Murthy Kasi, is an Indian film music composer, director and actor.

== Career ==
After completion of MBA and winning gold medal in 2007, he left to Dubai where he worked as a radio jockey and music composer for international jingles in Dubai radio station. Realizing that his passion was to make music, he quit his job and pursued his passion. An accomplished keyboard player, he offered live music for plays in Andhra University, Vizag.

After working for Abheera for Maa TV in 2011, he has also created fusion albums along with playback singer Sai Shivani in the same year. He composed tunes for Mr. 7, which was his debut project.

When Ram Gopal Varma's film Siva released in 1989, Munna Kasi says he was only a kid, but he became a big fan of RGV and Ilaiyaraaja. Munna Kasi's dream came true when Ram Gopal Varma selected him for the unreleased films like “golusu”, “Sridevi”Spot, . but He composed one song for Killing Veerappan, starring Sri Shivarajkumar. The film was directed by Ram Gopal Varma, and he had his composition sung by the late Sri Puneeth Rajkumar.

Munna Kasi made his directorial debut with a horror film Heza and the movie was released in late 2019. His next horror film, C202, was a box office success.

== Filmography ==
Year	Film	Director	Writer	Actor	Music	Language	Notes
2012	Mr.7	No	No	No	Yes	Telugu	
2014	Amma Nanna Oorelthe	No	No	No	Yes	Telugu	
2015	Chitram Cheppina Katha	No	No	No	Yes	Telugu	
2016	Killing Veerappan	No	No	No	Yes	Kannada	
2019	Heza	Yes	Yes	Yes	Yes	Telugu	
2024	C202	Yes	Yes	Yes	Yes	Telugu	Also editor
