= Jeeva (Telugu actor) =

Indian Telugu actor

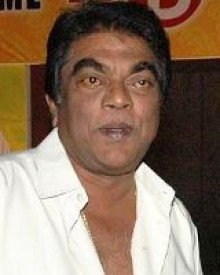
- Born: Kocharla Dayarathnam; 30 November 1952 (age 73); Guntur, Andhra Pradesh
- Occupation: Actor
- Years active: 1975–present

Kocharla Dayarathnam (born 30 November 1952), better known as Jeeva, is an Indian actor who works primarily in Telugu and Hindi films. He has been working in films since 1978 and is well known for his negative roles in various Ram Gopal Varma films, particularly Satya (as Jagga), Ab Tak Chhappan (as Commissioner Suchak) and Sarkar (as Swami Virendra). He has acted in around 250 films in Telugu and Hindi languages.

== Personal life ==
He was born as Kocharla Dayaratnam. He hails from the Cobaldpet neighborhood in Guntur city. K. Balachander changed his name to Jeeva after his first film, changing his fortunes forever. He named his son as K. Balachander. His son is a director of Telugu film. He has seven siblings.

== Career ==
He made his debut as an actor with the film Swargam Narakam (1975) before acting in the film Tholi Kodi Koosindi (1981), directed by K. Balachander. He was selected for this role from a number of aspirants. Ganesh Patro gave him the stage name Jeeva. Later he worked with popular directors like Ram Gopal Varma, Vamsy, Krishna Vamsi, Puri Jagannadh etc.

== Filmography ==
=== Films ===
==== Telugu ====
| Year | Title | Role | Note |
|---|---|---|---|
| 1975 | Swargam Narakam | | |
| 1978 | Pranam Khareedu | | |
| 1980 | Gharana Donga | | |
| 1981 | Tholi Kodi Koosindi | | |
| 1982 | Kaliyuga Deepam | | |
| 1983 | Agni Samadi | | |
| 1983 | Bandipotu Rudramma | | |
| 1983 | Chandi Chamundi | | |
| 1983 | Kokilamma | | |
| 1983 | Swarajyam | | |
| 1984 | Bharatham Lo Sankaravam | | |
| 1984 | Bobbili Brahmanna | | |
| 1984 | Dopidi Dongalu | | |
| 1984 | S. P. Bayankar | | |
| 1984 | Railu Dopidi | Ranjith | |
| 1984 | Pralaya Simham | Gopal | |
| 1984 | Rowdy | Rajendra | |
| 1984 | Yamadootalu | | |
| 1985 | Bebbuli Veta | | |
| 1985 | Jay Bhetala | | |
| 1985 | Nerasthudu | Papa Rao | |
| 1985 | Mantra Dandam | Kailasa Varma | |
| 1985 | Mayaladi | Maarigaadu aka Madhava Rao | |
| 1985 | Terror | Sayi | |
| 1985 | Sanchalanam | | |
| 1986 | Iddaru Mithrulu | Jimbo | |
| 1986 | Sri Vemana Charitra | | |
| 1986 | Seetharama Kalyanam | | |
| 1987 | Brahma Nayudu | | |
| 1987 | Daada | | |
| 1987 | Dongodochadu | Ramudu | |
| 1987 | Chinnari Devatha | | |
| 1988 | Aada Bomma | | |
| 1988 | Ooregimpu | | |
| 1988 | Varasudochadu | | |
| 1989 | Chettu Kinda Pleader | | |
| 1989 | Dhruva Nakshatram | | |
| 1989 | Shiva | | |
| 1989 | Gandipeta Rahasyam | | |
| 1989 | Lankeswarudu | | |
| 1990 | Anna Thammudu | | |
| 1990 | Inspector Rudra | | |
| 1990 | Prajala Manishi | S.I. Bhushan | |
| 1990 | Dharma | | |
| 1990 | Indrajit | | |
| 1990 | Kokila | | |
| 1991 | Sathruvu | | |
| 1991 | Parama Sivudu | | |
| 1992 | Bhale Khaideelu | | |
| 1992 | Detective Narada | | |
| 1992 | Moratodu Naa Mogudu | | |
| 1992 | Donga Police | | |
| 1992 | Brahma | | |
| 1992 | Joker Mama Super Alludu | Veerraju | |
| 1992 | Sukharavam Mahalakshmi | | |
| 1992 | Karuninchina Kanaka Durga | | |
| 1993 | Abbaigaru | | |
| 1993 | Kunti Putrudu | | |
| 1993 | Varasudu | | |
| 1993 | Rowdy Gari Teacher | | |
| 1993 | Vasthavam | | |
| 1994 | Anna | | |
| 1994 | Yes Nenante Nene | | |
| 1995 | Gulabi | | |
| 1995 | Mounam | | |
| 1995 | Bharatha Simham | | |
| 1995 | Simha Garjana | | |
| 1995 | Telugu Veera Levara | Tiger's henchman | |
| 1996 | Amma Durgamma | | |
| 1996 | Amma Nagamma | | |
| 1996 | Deyyam | | |
| 1996 | Mrugam | | |
| 1997 | Chilakkottudu | | |
| 1997 | Atha Nee Koduku Jagartha | | |
| 1997 | Priyamaina Srivaru | | |
| 1997 | Encounter | | |
| 1997 | High Class Atta Low Class Alludu | | |
| 1997 | Veedevadandi Babu | | |
| 1998 | Cheekati Suryulu | | |
| 1998 | Gamyam | Khan | |
| 1998 | Ganesh | | |
| 1998 | Khaidi Garu | | |
| 1998 | Sri Ramulayya | | |
| 1998 | Sambhavam | | |
| 1998 | Swarnakka | | |
| 1998 | Suryudu | | |
| 1999 | English Pellam East Godavari Mogudu | | |
| 1999 | Sambayya | | |
| 1999 | Rythu Rajyam | | |
| 1999 | Sultan | | |
| 1999 | Telangana | | |
| 1999 | Velugu Needalu | | |
| 2000 | Manoharam | | |
| 2000 | Ganapathi | | |
| 2000 | Vijayaramaraju | | |
| 2000 | Adavi Chukka | | |
| 2000 | Suri | | |
| 2001 | Ayodhya Ramayya | | |
| 2001 | Ammo Bomma | | |
| 2001 | Chinna | Police Inspector | |
| 2001 | Maa Ayana Sundarayya | | |
| 2001 | Bhadrachalam | | |
| 2001 | Chirujallu | | |
| 2001 | Itlu Sravani Subramanyam | | |
| 2002 | Avunu Valliddaru Ista Paddaru | | |
| 2002 | Adrustam | | |
| 2002 | Idiot | | |
| 2002 | Lagna Patrika | | |
| 2002 | Neetho Cheppalani | | |
| 2003 | Charminar | | |
| 2003 | Dhanush | | |
| 2003 | Ammulu | | |
| 2003 | Donga Ramudu and Party | | |
| 2003 | Dongodu | | |
| 2003 | Kabaddi Kabaddi | | |
| 2003 | Tagore | | |
| 2003 | Villain | | |
| 2004 | Andhrawala | | |
| 2004 | Andaru Dongale Dorikithe | | |
| 2004 | Seshadri Naidu | | |
| 2004 | Athade Oka Sainyam | | |
| 2004 | Mass | | |
| 2004 | Sorry Naaku Pellaindi | | |
| 2004 | Swamy | | |
| 2004 | Venky | | |
| 2004 | Yuvasena | | |
| 2004 | Apparao Driving School | | |
| 2004 | Konchem Touchlo Vunte Cheputanu | | |
| 2005 | 786 Khaidi Premakatha | | |
| 2005 | Balu ABCDEFG | | |
| 2005 | Mulla Keeretam | | |
| 2005 | Chinna | | |
| 2005 | Bhadra | | |
| 2005 | Bhageeratha | | |
| 2005 | Chakram | | |
| 2005 | Chatrapati | | |
| 2005 | Evadi Gola Vaadidhi | | |
| 2005 | Nayakudu | | |
| 2005 | Moguds Pellams | | |
| 2005 | Soggadu | | |
| 2005 | Sri | | |
| 2006 | Asadhyudu | | |
| 2006 | Ashok | | |
| 2006 | Oka V Chitram | | |
| 2006 | Ranam | | |
| 2006 | Iddaru Athalu Muddula Alludu | | |
| 2006 | Shock | | |
| 2006 | Sri Krishna 2006 | | |
| 2006 | Sundaraniki Tondara Ekkuva | | |
| 2006 | Tata Birla Madhyalo Laila | | |
| 2006 | Veedhi | | |
| 2007 | Aadavari Matalaku Ardhalu Verule | | |
| 2007 | Alaa 5 March | | |
| 2007 | Allare Allari | | |
| 2007 | Bhajantrilu | | |
| 2007 | Bhookailas | | |
| 2007 | Chandamama | | |
| 2007 | Desamuduru | | |
| 2007 | Don | | |
| 2007 | Maisamma IPS | | |
| 2007 | Mantra | | |
| 2007 | Sri Mahalakshmi | | |
| 2007 | State Rowdy | | |
| 2007 | Toss | | |
| 2007 | Viyyalavari Kayyalu | | |
| 2007 | Nava Vasantham | | |
| 2008 | Bhadradri | | |
| 2008 | Black & White | | |
| 2008 | Jagadguru Sri Kasi Narayana Charitra | | |
| 2008 | Blade Babji | | |
| 2008 | Bommana Brothers Chandana Sisters | | |
| 2008 | Bujjigadu | | |
| 2008 | Salam Hyderabad | | |
| 2008 | Dongala Bandi | | |
| 2008 | Friends Colony | | |
| 2008 | Gajibiji | | |
| 2008 | Gorintaku | | |
| 2008 | Veedhi Rowdy | | |
| 2008 | John Appa Rao 40 Plus | | |
| 2008 | Kshudra | | |
| 2008 | Kuberulu | | |
| 2008 | Mangatayaru Tiffin Center | Nimmagadda Bhanumurthy aka President | |
| 2008 | Raksha | | |
| 2008 | Sombheri | | |
| 2008 | Tinnama Padukunnama, Tellarinda | | |
| 2008 | Wall Poster | | |
| 2009 | Bank | | |
| 2009 | Anjaneyulu | | |
| 2009 | Bendu Apparao R.M.P | | |
| 2009 | Giligintalu | | |
| 2009 | Gopi Gopika Godavari | | |
| 2009 | Saleem | | |
| 2009 | Samardhudu | | |
| 2009 | Sontha Ooru | | |
| 2010 | Seeta Ramula Kalyanam Lankalo | | |
| 2010 | Brahmalokam To Yamalokam Via Bhulokam | | |
| 2010 | Kathi Kantha Rao | | |
| 2010 | Buridi | | |
| 2010 | Panchakshari | | |
| 2010 | Namo Venkatesa | | |
| 2011 | Chattam | | |
| 2011 | Madatha Kaja | | |
| 2012 | Damarukam | | |
| 2012 | Julayi | | |
| 2012 | Thikka | | |
| 2013 | Swamy Ra Ra | | |
| 2013 | Athadu Aame O Scooter | | |
| 2013 | Kevvu Keka | | |
| 2013 | Bunny n Cherry | | |
| 2014 | Jump Jilani | | |
| 2014 | Ee Varsham Sakshiga | | |
| 2015 | Ladies & Gentlemen | | |
| 2015 | Malini & Co. | | |
| 2016 | Savitri | | |
| 2016 | Okka Ammayi Thappa | | |
| 2016 | Premam | | |
| 2017 | Duvvada Jagannadham | | |
| 2017 | Cine Mahal | | |
| 2017 | Samanthakamani | | |
| 2017 | London Babulu | | |
| 2017 | Duvvada Jagannadham | | |
| 2017 | Gulf | | |
| 2018 | Nannu Dochukunduvate | | |
| 2018 | Raa Raa | | |
| 2018 | Yatra | | |
| 2018 | Bharat Ane Nenu | | |
| 2018 | Lover | | |
| 2019 | Mathu Vadalara | | |
| 2019 | Kothaga Maa Prayanam | | |
| 2020 | Disco Raja | | |
| 2021 | Krack | | |
| 2021 | Deyyam | | |
| 2022 | Jetty | | |
| 2022 | Sundarangudu | | |
| 2022 | Raajahyogam | Sugar Daddy | |
| 2024 | Brahmmavaram P.S. Paridhilo | CI Vittal | |
| 2024 | Nenu-Keerthana | | |
| 2025 | Trimukha | Frequency Baba | |
| 2025 | They Call Him OG | Gossiper | |
| 2025 | Paanch Minar | Chotu’s father | |

==== Hindi ====
| Year | Title | Role |
|---|---|---|
| 1998 | Satya | Jagga Hyderabadi |
| 2004 | Ab Tak Chhappan | IPS Commissioner M.P. Suchak |
| 2005 | D | Gangaram |
| 2005 | Sarkar | Swami Virendra |
| 2006 | Darwaza Bandh Rakho | Sharat Shetty |
| 2007 | Yatra | Pulla Reddy, Zameendar |
| 2007 | Ram Gopal Varma Ki Aag | Dhaania |
| 2010 | Lahore | Kunjal Bhaskar Reddy |
| 2010 | Phoonk 2 | Exorcist |

==== Tamil ====
| Year | Title | Role |
|---|---|---|
| 1981 | Enga Ooru Kannagi | |
| 1984 | Nyayam Ketkiren | Inspector Ashok |
| 1984 | Nallavanukku Nallavan | 'Veri Naai' Vengaiya |
| 1987 | Shankar Guru | Ethiraj |
| 1989 | Sonthakkaran | Ravayya |
| 2007 | Thiru Ranga | Film financier |
| 2008 | Satyam | Punniyakodi |
| 2009 | Vettaikaran | Sandi |
| 2023 | Priyamudan Priya | |

==== Kannada ====
| Year | Title | Role | Ref. |
|---|---|---|---|
| 2010 | Super | Cop | |
| 2011 | Sogasugara | Cop | |
| 2012 | 18th Cross | Inspector Kote | |
| 2014 | Savaari 2 | | |
| 2017 | Smuggler | | |

==== Malayalam ====
| Year | Title | Role |
|---|---|---|
| 1981 | Ahimsa | |
| 1991 | Mizhikal | |
| 1992 | Unmadalahari | |

=== Television ===
| Year | Title | Role | Network | Notes |
|---|---|---|---|---|
| 2020 | Chadarangam | Yogeswar Rao | ZEE5 | |
| 2022 | Recce | MLA | ZEE5 | |
| 2025 | Mayasabha | Basi Reddy | SonyLIV | |
