= Before Marriage =

- Theatrical release poster
- Directed by: Sreedhar Reddy Atakula
- Written by: Sreedhar Reddy Atakula
- Produced by: Yeddula Jagadeswara Reddy
- Starring: Naveena Reddy; Naga Mahesh; Sunitha Manohar; Lakshman
- Cinematography: Rajasekar Reddy
- Edited by: Aloshious Xavier
- Music by: Peddapalli Rohith
- Production company: Hanuma creations
- Distributed by: SKML Motion Pictures
- Release date: 26 January 2024
- Country: India
- Language: Telugu

Before Marriage is a 2024 Indian-Telugu language romantic drama film written and directed by Sreedhar Reddy Atakula. The film stars Naveena Reddy and Naga Mahesh in the lead roles with Sunitha Manohar and B.Supriya portraying supporting roles.

== Cast ==
- Naveena Reddy as Dharani
- Naga Mahesh as Srinivasa Rao
- Sunitha Manohar as Sumathi
- Lakshman as Karthik

== Production ==
The film was produced by Hanuma Creation under the banner of Yeddula Jagadeswara Reddy. The cinematography was produced by Rajasekar Reddy, while the film was edited by Aloshious Xavier.

== Reception ==
A critic from Sakshi rated the film 2.5 out of 5 and stated that "The film was shot close to reality." Shekhar Kusuma of Samayam noted that "Even though it is a small film, they have made a good effort to connect with the youth."
