= Market Mahalakshmi =

2024 Indian film by VS Mukkhesh

- Theatrical release poster
- Directed by: VS Mukkhesh
- Written by: VS Mukkhesh
- Produced by: Akhilesh Kalaru
- Starring: Parvateesam; Praneeka Anvikaa; Harsha Vardhan; Mukku Avinash; Mahaboob Basha; Kedar Shankar; Hara Srinivas; Rashmitha Panthagani
- Cinematography: Surendra Chilumula
- Edited by: RM Vishwanadh Kuchanapally
- Music by: Joe Enmav
- Production company: B2P Studios
- Release date: 19 April 2024
- Running time: 134 minutes
- Country: India
- Language: Telugu

Market Mahalakshmi is a 2024 Telugu language comedy drama film directed by VS Mukkhesh, produced by Akhilesh Kalaru under B2P Studios. It stars Parvateesam, Praneeka Anvikaa, Harsha Vardhan, Mukku Avinash, Mahaboob Basha, Kedar Shankar, Hara Srinivas and Rashmitha Panthagani. The film's music was composed by Joe Emmav, with camera handled by Surendra Chilumula and editing by RM Vishwanadh Kuchanapally.

== Plot ==
A young man makes an effort to get close to a self-employed street vendor. He tries many approaches to persuade her to marry him in spite of their differences.

== Cast ==
- Parvateesam
- Praneeka Anvikaa
- Harsha Vardhan
- Mukku Avinash
- Mahaboob Basha
- Kedar Shankar
- Hara Srinivas
- Rashmitha Panthagani

== Reception ==
Market Mahalakshmi opened with mixed reviews. A critic from The Hans India gave the film 2.75 out of 5 rating. OTT Play gave 2.5 out of 5 rating.
