= Parakramam (2024 Telugu film) =

2024 Indian Telugu-language film by Bandi Saroj Kumar

- Theatrical release poster
- Directed by: Bandi Saroj Kumar
- Written by: Bandi Saroj Kumar
- Produced by: Bandi Saroj Kumar
- Starring: Bandi Saroj Kumar
- Cinematography: Venkat Rama Prasad
- Edited by: Bandi Saroj Kumar
- Music by: Bandi Saroj Kumar
- Production company: BSK Mainstream
- Release date: 22 August 2024
- Running time: 117 minutes
- Country: India
- Language: Telugu

Parakramam is a 2024 Telugu-language action drama film written, directed and produced by Bandi Saroj Kumar, who also stars in the lead role alongside Naga Laxmi & Sruthi Samanvi. He has also composed the music. The film was released on 22 August 2024.

== Plot ==
The film depicts the life of Lovaraju, who is both a theatre artist and a gully cricketer in the village of Lampakalova.

== Cast ==
- Bandi Saroj Kumar in a dual role as
  - Satti Babu
  - Lovaraju, Satti Babu's son
- Sruthi Samanvi as Bujjamma
- Naga Lakshmi Yellagula
- Mohan Senapati
- Nikhil Gopu
- Anil Kumar
- Vamsiraj Nekkant
- Shashank Vennelakanti

== Music ==
The music is composed by Bandi Saroj Kumar.

All lyrics are written by Bandi Saroj Kumar; all music is composed by Bandi Saroj Kumar.

Track list
No.	Title	Singer(s)	Length
1.	"Manishi Nenu"	Hymath Mohammed	2:18
2.	"Dream"	Sri Vaishnavi Goparaju	1:46
3.	"Cricket"	Aditya Bheemathati	2:00

== Release ==
The teaser of the film was released on 24 May 2024. The film earlier had two scheduled release dates – 14 February 2024 and 27 June 2024. It was later released on 22 August 2024. It was released on Aha on 14 September 2024.

== Reception ==
NTV gave a rating of 2.25 out of 5 and praised Bandi Saroj Kumar's work and acting performance. Aditya Devulapally of Cinema Express gave a rating of 2.5 out of 5 and statedBandi Saroj Kumar impresses as Charlie Chaplin and brings the vulnerability necessary to draw the viewer in with the story".
