= Mahendra Nath Kondla =

Indian Telugu film producer

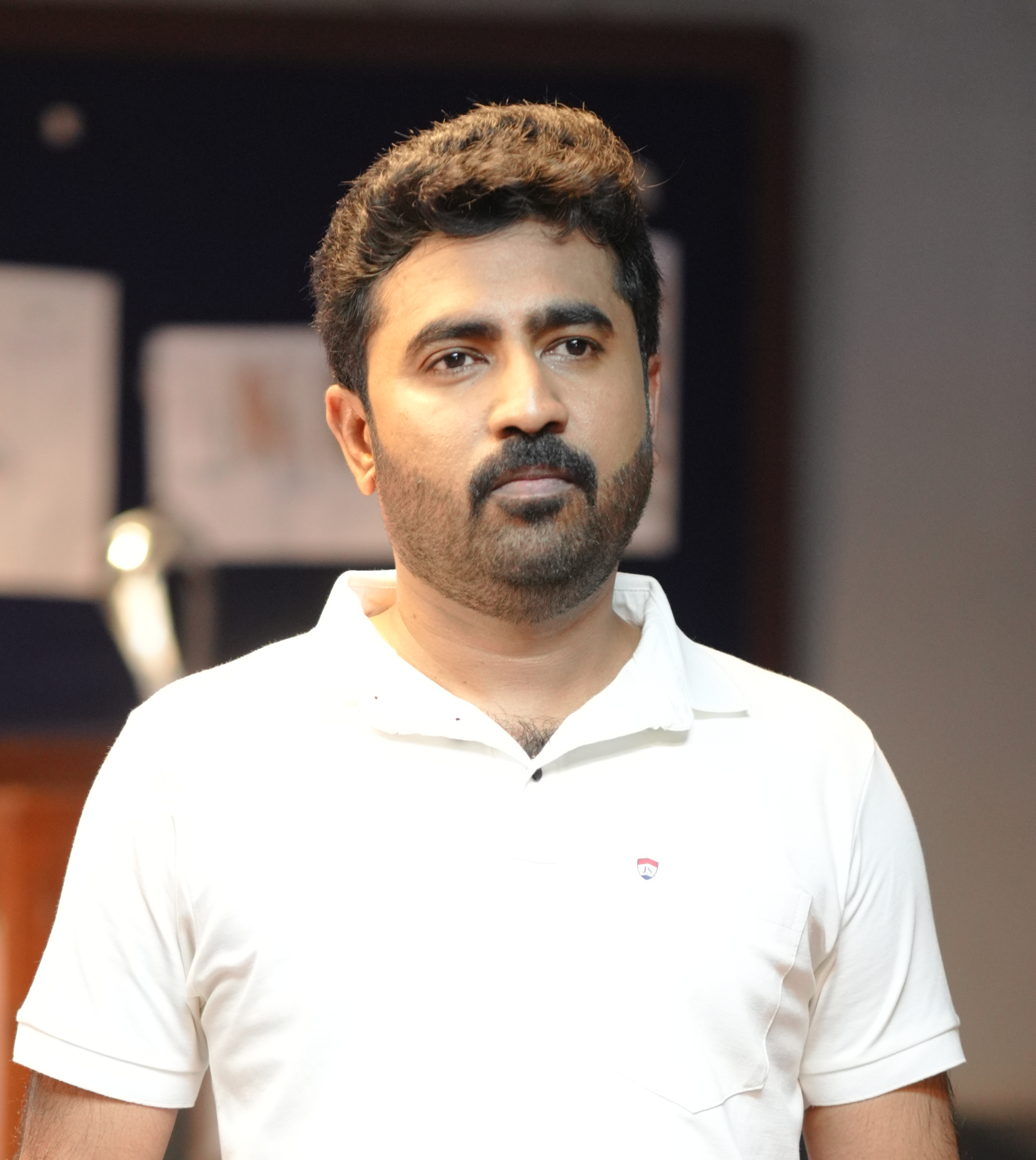
- Mahendra Nath in a movie shooting location in 2024
- Born: Guntur, Andhra Pradesh, India
- Occupation: Producer
- Years active: 2024–present

Mahendra Nath Kondla is an Indian film producer in Telugu cinema. He ventured into film production under his production company called Maha Movies and has produced films such as Sabari and Viraaji.

== Filmography ==
=== As producer ===
Year	Title	Actors	Notes
2024	Sabari	Varalaxmi Sarathkumar, Mime Gopi	Best Story Film award at the Dasari Film Awards 2025
2024	Viraaji	Varun Sandesh	
2025	Chowdary Gari Abbayi tho Naidu Gari Ammayi †	Amardeep Chowdary, Supreeta Naidu	
