= Ground (film) =

2024 Telugu film

- Theatrical release poster
- Directed by: Suraj
- Written by: Vijay Gattu
- Screenplay by: Suraj
- Produced by: Suraj
- Starring: Harinath Raj; Tejaswini; Suman Singasani
- Cinematography: Jaheer Basha
- Edited by: Jaheer Basha
- Music by: Bhaskar Appalla
- Production company: Cinecode Studios
- Release date: 23 February 2024
- Running time: 102 minutes
- Country: India
- Language: Telugu

Ground is a 2024 Indian Telugu language independent sports drama film directed and produced by Suraj in his directorial debut. It stars newcomers Harinath, Tejaswini and Suman. The story was written by Vijay Gattu, film score was composed by Bhaskar Appalla, and cinematography was done by Jaheer Basha.

== Plot ==
This is the story of a group of teenage boys who play cricket in the ground every Sunday. Hari and Teju are in love with each other, and Hari is mad about playing cricket. One day when Hari and his group of friends go to the ground to play cricket, they get into an argument with another group of boys playing nearby. The arguments escalate to Hari making his team agree to play a bet cricket match with the opposite team. The story unfolds to show whether Hari's team won the bet match or not, and how it affected his love story with Teju.

== Cast ==
- Harinath Raj as Hari / Captain, Teju's boyfriend
- Tejaswini as Teju / Minnu, Hari's girlfriend
- Suman Singasani as Suman
- Durga Bhavani as Durga
- Preethi as Chinnu, Gula's sister
- Nagaraj Badhavath as Thonda
- Vasishta Kunde as Gula, Chinnu's brother
- Praveen Kinthali as admin
- Gopichand Alla as Chimtu
- Rajesh Perka as Nattu
- Pradeep Patra as Chotu
- Bhoopathi Patendla as Aagam
- Jagadeesh Garimella as Jaggu
- Narsing Wadekar as Narsi
- Harsha Chakilam as Harsha
- Varun Maithra as Varun
- Manideep as Mani
- Suresh Valluri as Suresh
- Mahesh Seethala as Mahesh

== Production ==
This is a single-location film, having the entire movie taking place within a ground. The incidents in the film amount to only 2–3 hours in real-time.

== Music ==
The background score was composed by Bhaskar Appalla.

== Release ==
=== Theatrical ===
Ground was released theatrically on 23 February 2024.

=== Home media ===
Ground is digitally available on Prime Video.

== Reception ==
The movie received mixed to positive reviews from the critics.

Sarvepalli Bhavana from Times Now gave the film 3 out of 5 stars, and stated, "Ground breaks away from the conventions of mainstream Telugu cinema, presenting a refreshingly natural narrative. Shot with natural lighting and minimal resources, the film exudes authenticity, a departure from the formulaic approach of mainstream cinema."

Suhas Sistu of The Hans India gave 2.75 stars out of 5 and stated, "In the realm of Telugu cinema, where big-budget spectacles often dominate the landscape, Ground emerges as a refreshing and distinctive gem." and concluded with "Suraj's directorial debut is a testament to the potential of storytelling beyond the mainstream."

Suresh Rachamalla of News18 gave 2.75 stars out of 5 and verdicted, "Each character feels important in the story, and with new actors the storyline felt fresh. But the story has some lag scenes."

Nelki Naresh Kumar of Hindustan Times gave 2.5 out of 5 stars and said, "The movie took too much time to introduce the characters, and the comedy did not evoke much laughter. But the newcomers Hari and Tejaswini acted well in their roles. Bhaskar's music and Jaheer's cinematography complemented director Suraj's fresh attempt."

A critic of 10TV gave a positive review to the film and stated, "The entire movie is shot either in the ground or in the locations nearby to the ground. There have been cricket based movies earlier, but this movie is different from them."
