= Sabari (2024 film) =

- Directed by: Anilkatz
- Written by: Anilkatz
- Produced by: Mahendra Nath Kondla
- Starring: Varalaxmi Sarathkumar; Mime Gopi; Ganesh Venkatraman; Shashank
- Cinematography: Rahul Shrivatsav; Nani Chamidishetty
- Edited by: Dharmendra Kakarala
- Music by: Gopi Sundar
- Production company: Maha Movies Production
- Release date: 3 May 2024
- Running time: 129 minutes
- Country: India
- Language: Telugu

Sabari is a 2024 Indian Telugu-language action thriller film written and directed by Anilkatz in his directorial debut and produced by Mahendra Nath Kondla. The film stars Varalaxmi Sarathkumar in the titular role alongside Mime Gopi, Ganesh Venkatraman, and Shashank. The film score was composed by Gopi Sundar, while the cinematography was done by Rahul Shrivatsav and Nani Chamidishetty, and editing was handled by Dharmendra Kakarala, respectively.

== Cast ==
- Varalaxmi Sarathkumar as Sanjana
- Shashank as lawyer
- Ganesh Venkatraman as Aravind
- Mime Gopi as Surya
- Madhunandan
- Sunaina Badam
- Keshav Deepak
- Rajashri Nair
- Ashritha Vemuganti
- Archana Ananth
- Krishnateja
- Viva Raghava
- Harshini Kodur
- Baby Krithika as Riya

== Release and Reception ==
Sabari was released theatrically in India on 3 May 2024

=== Streaming rights ===
The streaming rights of this movie were acquired by Sun NXT on 11 October 2024 along with Lionsgate Play and Amazon Prime Video on 21 March 2025.

Professional reviews

Review scores
- Source: Rating
Deccan Chronicle	2.75/5 stars
Sakshi.com	2.5/5 stars

=== Critical response ===
Sabari received negative reviews from critics.
