= We Love Bad Boys =

2024 Telugu film

- Theatrical release poster
- Directed by: Raju Rajendra Prasad
- Written by: Raju Rajendra Prasad; Anand Kodavatiganti
- Produced by: Pappula Kanaka Durgarao
- Starring: Ajay Kathurvar; Romika Sharma; Vamsi Ekasiri; Roshini Sahotha; Posani Krishna Murali; Sapthagiri; Ali
- Cinematography: V. K. Ramaraju
- Edited by: Nandamuri Hari
- Music by: Raghu Kunche; John Bhushan
- Production company: BM Creations
- Release date: 8 March 2024
- Country: India
- Language: Telugu

We Love Bad Boys is a 2024 Indian Telugu romantic comedy film directed by Raju Rajendra Prasad. The film stars Ajay Kathurvar, Vamsi Ekasiri, Aditya Shashank, Pragya Nayan, Romika Sharma, Roshni Sahotha, Posani Krishna Murali, Sapthagiri, Ali, Prithvi. The film is produced by Pappula Kanakadurga Rao. The music composed by Raghu Kunche. The cinematography was done by V. K. Ramaraju.

== Cast ==
- Ajay Kathurvar
- Romika Sharma
- Vamsi Ekasiri
- Roshini Sahotha
- Aditya Sasank
- Pragnya Nayan
- Posani Krishna Murali
- Sapthagiri
- Ali
- Prithvi
- Kasi Viswanath
- Sai Kishan Chennapatnam
- Raja Ashok Teja Vanamshetty
- Jillaram Tharun kumar

== Production ==
The film completed its censor and received a U/A certificate from the censor board on 19 December 2023. The film's first look was released on 14 February 2024.

== Soundtrack ==
We Love Bad Boys

Soundtrack album by Raghu Kunche, John Bhushan
- Released: 2 March 2024
- Genre: Film Soundtrack
- Language: Telugu
- Label: Aditya Music

Raghu Kunche chronology
Batch (2021)	We Love Bad Boys (2024)

The music was composed by Raghu Kunche and Bhushan John. A romantic single "Naalo Nenu" was released on 2 March 2024.

No.	Title	Singer(s)	Length
1.	"Naalo Nenu"	Manoj Sharma Kuchi	2:40
2.	"Nuvve Naa iPhone"	Arun Kaundinya	2:47
3.	"Kotthaga Vacchina"	Geetha Madhuri, Raghu Kunche	3:01
Total length:			8:28

== Release ==
The film is released on 8 March 2024.

== Reception ==
The film received mixed reviews.

A critic from Times Now gave the film 3/5 stars and stated, "The film boasts witty dialogues and direction and cinematography are commendable. On the flip side the mother character lacks depth. The item songs and their picturization are drawbacks."

A critic of News18 gave the film 2.75/5 stars and opined, "The climax evokes much laughter as the director gave a good script. If only the editing is sharper, this movie would have been much better."
