= Lorry Chapter – 1 =

2024 Indian film by Sreekanth Reddy Asam

- Promotional poster
- Directed by: Sreekanth Reddy Asam
- Written by: Sreekanth Reddy Asam
- Produced by: Sreekanth Reddy Asam
- Starring: Sreekanth Reddy Asam; Chandrashikha; Rockey Sing
- Cinematography: Nagarajuna Tadipatri
- Production company: King Maker Pictures
- Distributed by: SKML Motion Pictures
- Release date: 2 August 2024
- Country: India
- Language: Telugu

Lorry Chapter – 1 is a 2024 Indian Telugu-language drama film written and directed by Sreekanth Reddy Asam. The film stars Srekanth Reddy Asam and Chandrashikha along with Rockey Sing, Geetha Bhosle in supporting roles. The film was released on 2 August 2024.

== Cast ==
- Sreekanth Reddy Asam as Harshavardhan "Hunter"
- Chandrashikha
- Rockey Sing
- Geetha Bhosle

== Production ==
The film noted the debuted direction for Sreekanth Reddy Asam. The film was produced by Srekanth Reddy Asam under the banner of King Maker Pictures. The cinematography was done by Nagarajuna Tadipatri.

== Reception ==
Zee News critic stated that "Srikanth Reddy Asam is the main strength of this movie. With his experience as a YouTube star, he became the backbone of this film" and gave two point seven five out of five. Suhas Sistu of Hans India rated three out of five and stated that "Overall, "Lorry - Chapter 1 offers a thrilling and enjoyable cinematic experience. To truly appreciate Sreekanth's multi-talented prowess, this film is a must-watch in theaters."
