= 14 (film) =

Indian thriller film

- Theatrical release poster
- Directed by: Lakshmi Srinivas
- Written by: Lakshmi Srinivas; Adithya Bhargav
- Produced by: Subbarao Rayana; Siva Krishna Nichhena Metla; Srinivas D
- Starring: Noel Sean; Ram Rathan Reddy; Vishakha Dhiman
- Cinematography: Sainadh N
- Edited by: Janaki Rama Pamaraju; Sivaganesh
- Music by: Kalyan Nayak
- Production company: Royal Pictures
- Distributed by: Skml Motion Pictures
- Release date: 5 July 2024
- Country: India
- Language: Telugu

14 is a 2024 Indian Telugu-language thriller film written and directed by Lakshmi Srinivas. The film stars Noel Sean, Ram Rathan Reddy, and Vishakha Dhiman in the lead roles. The film was produced by Subbarao Rayana and Siva Krishna Nichenametla under the banner of Royal Pictures. The film was released on 5 July 2024.

== Cast ==
- Noel Sean as Surya
- Ram Rathan Reddy as Rathan
- Vishakha Dhiman as Neha
- Posani Krishna Murali as Chief minister
- Srikanth Iyengar as Journalist Subbu
- Mahesh Achanta as Hotel manager
- Rupa Lakshmi as Roopa

== Reception ==
The Hans India rated two point five out of five and stated that "On a whole, 14 is a captivating romantic thriller that offers a blend of suspense, romance, and social commentary"

Sakshi and News18 critics gave mixed reviews.
