= Viraaji =

2024 Telugu film

- Theatrical release poster
- Directed by: Adhyanth Harsha
- Written by: Adhyanth Harsha
- Produced by: Mahendra Nath Kondla
- Starring: Varun Sandesh; Pramodhini; Raghu Karumanchi
- Cinematography: GV Ajay Kumar
- Edited by: Ram Tumu
- Music by: Ebenezer Paul (EBBY)
- Production companies: Maha Movies and M3 Media
- Release date: 2 August 2024
- Country: India
- Language: Telugu

Viraaji is a 2024 Indian Telugu-language thriller film written and directed by Adhyanth Harsha. It is produced by Mahendra Nath Kondla under the banners of Maha Movies and M3 Media. The film stars Varun Sandesh and Pramodhini in the lead roles alongside Raghu Karumanchi and others.

The film was released on 2 August 2024 to mixed reviews.

== Plot ==
The story happens in Visakhapatnam city. A group of four people (a film producer, a stand-up comedian, a doctor and a pre wedding shoot photographer) goes to a place to attend and perform at the sanmanam event of a celebrity astrologer. After reaching the place, they realize that the place is creepy and weird. At the sanmanam event venue, they see Swamiji, a policeman, an event manager and a couple who are already present in that place.

When the event is about to start, they realize that the place is nothing but an abandoned mental asylum which was closed thirty years ago. In addition to that, due to lack of phone reception, they couldn't call and inform anyone about their situation. When they decide to leave, they found out that their vehicles were missing. When everyone starts to panic, a person named Andy enters the building. Andy's entry makes things worse and chaotic, as everyone starts to die one by one. Why did Andy come... is Andy really behind these murders or did he come on another agenda forms the crux of the story along with a spine chilling twist in the climax.

== Cast ==
- Varun Sandesh as Andy
- Raghu Karumanchi
- Pramodhini
- Balagam Jayaram
- Vaiva Raghav
- Raviteja Nannimala
- Kakinada Nani
- Phani Acharya
- Aparnadevi
- Kushalini Pulapa
- Prasad Behera

== Release ==
=== Theatrical ===
Viraaji was released worldwide on 2 August 2024 in Telugu language.

=== Distribution ===
Mythri Movie Makers acquired the distribution rights of the film for the Nizam region.

== Home media ==
The film premiered on Aha from 22 August 2024. It also being released on both Lionsgate Play and Amazon Prime Video on 22 March 2025.
