= Rahasyam Idam Jagath =

2024 Indian Telugu-language film by Komal R Bharadwaj

- Directed by: Komal R Bharadwaj
- Written by: Ravi Teja Nitta
- Produced by: Padma Ravinuthula; Hiranya Ravinuthula
- Cinematography: Taylor Bluemel
- Edited by: Chota K Prasad
- Music by: Gyaani
- Production company: Singlecell Universe Production
- Release date: 8 November 2024
- Country: India
- Language: Telugu

Rahasyam Idham Jagath is a 2024 Indian Telugu-language science fiction mythological thriller film directed by Komal R Bharadwaj. The film was released on 8 November 2024.

== Plot ==
Abhi and Akhira are young couple living in the United States. Akira receives news of his fathers death. She decides to go back to India. Abhi also decides to go back with her. But situations flip upside down in a single night, when they choose to give party to their friends in a town. What happens on that night, will Akira meet her mom is the story.

== Cast ==
- Rakesh Galebhe as Abhiram
- Sravanthi Prattipati as Akira
- Manasa Veena as Aruni
- Bhargav GVSS as Kalyan
- Karteek Kandala as Vishwa
- Shiva Kumar Juturi as Rushi
- Adi Naidu as Aadi
- Laasya Ravinuthula as Aru Jr.

== Music ==
The film's music is composed by Gyaani.

No.	Title	Lyrics	Singer(s)	Length
1.	"Jagame Vidhiga"	Ramesh Kumar Vakacharla	Ramesh Kumar Vakacharla, Harika Narayan	4:17

== Release and reception ==
Rahaysam Idam Jagath was released on 8 November 2024.

Sangeetha Devi Dundoo of The Hindu stated "appreciable effort to attempt a medley of adventure, science and mystery but falls way short of realising its potential". Writing to The Hans India, Kausalya Rachavelpula felt " Rahasayam Idam Jagath is an ambitious attempt to explore complex ideas like quantum physics, the multiverse, and alternate realities through the lens of Indian mythology".
