= Samudrudu =

Indian action drama film

- Theatrical release poster
- Directed by: Nagesh Naradasi
- Written by: Nagesh Naradasi
- Produced by: Badavath Kishan, Gnaneshwar Somulu
- Starring: Ramakanth; Avanthika Bhanu Sree; Suman; Raj Premi; Sravan; Suman Shetty; Ramaraju
- Cinematography: Vasu
- Edited by: Hari Nandamuri
- Music by: Subhash Anand
- Production company: Keerthana Productions
- Release date: 25 October 2024
- Running time: 148 minutes
- Country: India
- Language: Telugu

Samudrudu is a 2024 Indian Telugu-language action drama film written and directed by Nagesh Naradasi. The film was produced by Badavath Kishan and Gnaneshwar Somulu under the banner of Keerthana Productions.

It features Ramakanth, Avanthika, Bhanu Sree, Suman, Raj Premi, Sravan, Suman Shetty, and Ramaraju as lead characters.

The music of the film is composed by Subhash Anand while Vasu is the cinematographer. The editing is done by Hari Nandamuri.

The film was released on 25 October 2024.

== Plot ==
In the fishermen-only village of vetapalem, life centers around fishing. Ganga is a young man who plays with his pals, sings and drinks, and helps others. Alluraiah and his kid deva live in this village. Buys peasants' fish cheaply and sells them to the metropolis for much more. Ganga, who opposes this unethical tactic, suggests they sell the fish themselves, escalating their animosity. Deva's wife prepares for her sister, nandini, to return to prevent the issue from escalating. She stresses that the ganga feud would hurt them all.

In the community, a new teacher renovates the dilapidated school. Brings change with ganga help despite parents' reluctance to send kids to school. Ganga likes this teacher. Ganga announces in front of everyone that he will marry nandini for the village, not the teacher. A major opponent named "gajini mohammad" arrives at the vetapalem sea after learning about a lakh-dollar tuna fish migration. The town cannot oppose him alone. His followers kill numerous villages with savagery. Ganga beats gajini Mohammad and his followers with the help of a rural police officer, ensuring justice. Ganga's effort pays off as the people get the tuna they hunted. Finally sees nandini.

== Cast ==
- Ramakanth as Ganga
- Avanthika as Anjali
- Bhanu Sree as Nandhini
- Suman as Sarath Chandra
- Raj Premi as Ghajini Mohammad
- Sravan as Deva
- Suman Setty as Singa
- Ramaraju as Alluraiah
- Prabhavathi as Anjamma
- Chitram Srinu as Seenu
- Sammeta Gandhi as Shankaraiah
- Shaking Seshu as Lawyer
- Teja Reddy as Roopavathy
- Bhel Prasad as Constable
- Dil Ramesh as Abbulu

== Soundtrack ==
The music and background score is composed by Subhash Anand. The singers are Vandemataram Srinivas, Ramya Behara, Renu Kumar, Dhanunjay and S.P.B. Charan.

No.	Title	Singer(s)	Length
1	Ee Roje Challani Kaburrlu	Vandemataram Srinivas	4:31
2	Magada Magada	Ramya Behara, Renu Kumar	3:23
3	Mahaveera Maruthi	Dhanunjay	3:43
4	Kola Kalla Vayari	S.P.B. Charan	4:18
		Total Length	15:55

== Reception ==
Suhas Sistu of The Hans India rated the film 2.75 stars out of five stars and said "Samudrudu succeeds in delivering a heartfelt action drama with relatable themes of perseverance and community spirit. Despite a few technical drawbacks like inconsistent background music, the film remains engaging due to its strong performances, particularly by Suman. It’s a family entertainer that provides both visual appeal and emotional depth, making it a worthwhile watch."

Suresh Rachamalla of News18 Telugu rated the film 2.75 stars out of five stars and said "The film is easily connected to the audience as it is about all known artists in the movie. The story has not yet felt much effect on screenplay, even though dipping is a little sink. The film, which comes in Action Drama Zoner, features such expectations and hits the audience."

TA Kiran Kumar of Zee News Telugu rated the film 2.75 stars out of five stars and said "Never mind the background score for the movie. Except for the hero, the heroines .. Audiences are easily connected as the rest of the actors are known. The film's O category is appealing to the audience, though the dipping is not a little sink. Without compromising producers anywhere .. Well spent in technical terms. It looks on the screen."
