= Bahirbhoomi =

Indian mystery thriller film

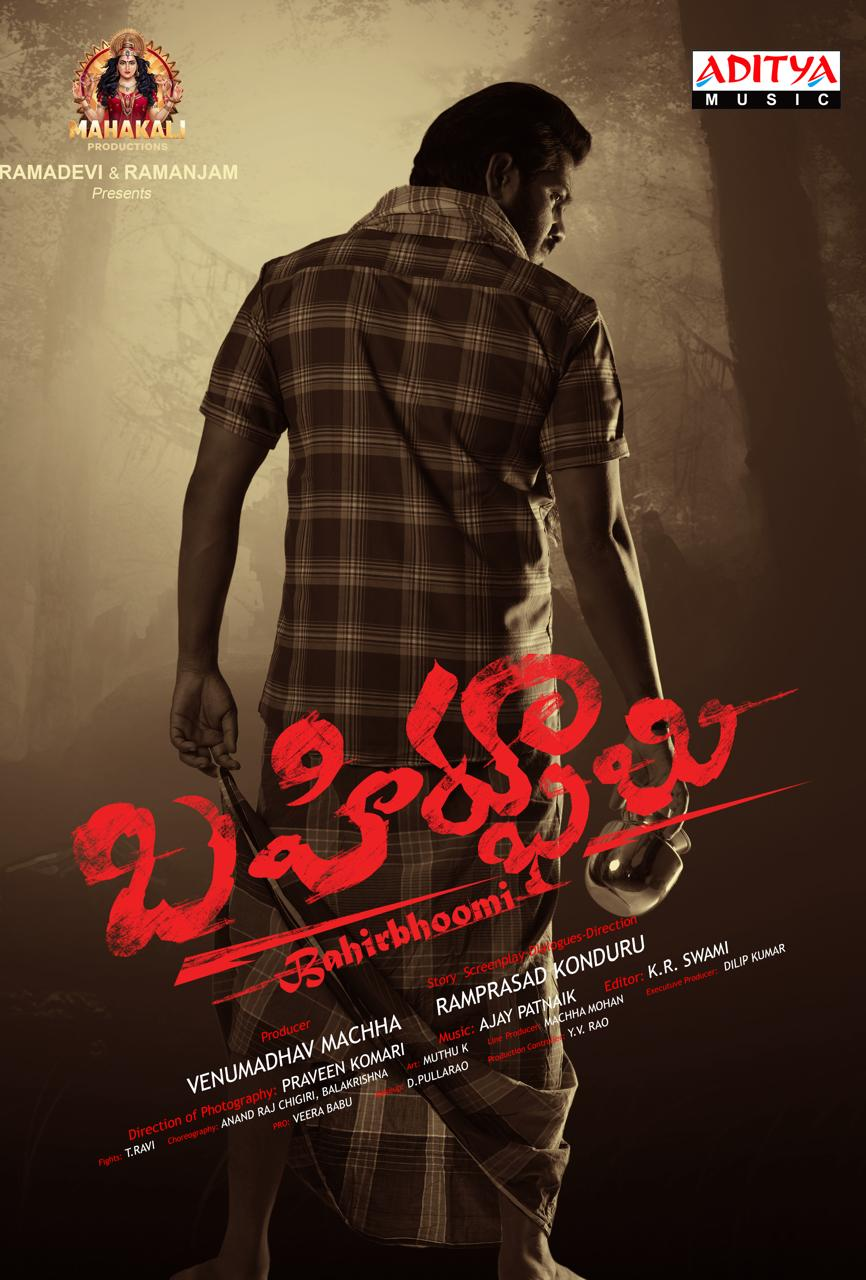
- Directed by: Ramprasad Konduru
- Produced by: Venu Madhav Machha
- Starring: Noel Sean; Rishitha Nellore
- Cinematography: Praveen Komari
- Edited by: Kr Swami
- Music by: Ajay Patnaik
- Release date: 4 October 2024
- Running time: 120 minutes
- Country: India
- Language: Telugu

Bahirbhoomi is a 2024 Indian Telugu-language mystery thriller film written and directed by Ramprasad Konduru and produced by Venumadhav Machha for Mahakali Productions. The film features Noel Sean and Rishitha Nellore in lead roles with Chitram Srinu, Garima Singh and Jabardasth Phani in pivotal roles.

== Plot ==
The film follows a series of murders within the family of the village leader. Amid the chaos, their servant accidentally kills someone and is quickly arrested by the authorities adding layers of mystery and tension to the unfolding drama.

== Cast ==
- Noel Sean as Krishna
- Rishitha Nellore as Gowri
- Garima Singh as Leela
- Chitram Srinu as Nagendra
- Vijaya Ranga Raju as Subba Reddy
- Jaya Vahini as Durga
- Jabardasth Phani as Mani

== Soundtrack ==
Bahirbhoomi

Soundtrack album
- Released: 2024
- Recorded: 2024
- Genre: Feature film soundtrack
- Length: 15:46
- Language: Telugu
- Label: Aditya Music
External audio
- EP on Spotify

Track listing
No.	Title	Lyrics	Singer(s)	Length
1.	"Ga Ga Gundelo"	Devendra	Prakash	3:53
2.	"Gammathaina Gaali Vana"	Devendra	Aditya Bheemathati	4:17
3.	"Bahirbhoomi Title Song"	Devendra	Aditya Bheemathati, Noel Sean	3:06
4.	"Dilrooba Mahabooba"	Devendra	Sushmitha Rajesh, Aishwarya	4:30
Total length:				15:46

== Release ==
The film was released on 4 October 2024.
