= C 202 (film) =

Upcoming Indian film by Munna Kasi

C.202
- Theatrical release poster
- Directed by: Munna Kasi
- Produced by: Manohari KA
- Starring: Munna Kasi; Sharon Riah Fernandez; Tanikella Bharani; Satya Prakash; Subhalekha Sudhakar; Shafi; Archana Ananth; Chitram Srinu; Idream Anjali; Y. Vijaya
- Cinematography: Seetharamaraju Upputhalla
- Edited by: Munna Kasi
- Music by: Munna Kasi
- Production company: Mighty Oak Pictures
- Release date: October 25, 2024
- Running time: 135 minutes
- Country: India
- Language: Telugu

C.202 is a 2024 Indian Telugu language horror film directed, written, composed and edited by Munna Kasi and produced by Manohari KA under the Mighty Oak Pictures banner. The film stars himself and Sharon Riah Fernandez.

== Plot ==
In the horror thriller C.202, a family purchases a seemingly charming villa at a bargain price, unaware that it is infused with tantrik powers. As they face terrifying supernatural events, they discover they were drawn to the villa for a sinister reason connected to their past. With the hero's bravery and unexpected allies, they confront the malevolent forces, but as the climax approaches, one question remains: has the evil truly been defeated, or does it still lurk in the shadows?

== Cast ==
- Munna Kasi
- Sharon Riah Fernandez
- Tanikella Bharani as Bura
- Satya Prakash
- Subhalekha Sudhakar
- Shafi
- Archana Ananth
- Chitram Srinu
- Idream Anjali
- Y. Vijaya

== Production ==
Munna Kasi directed, acted, composed for and edited the film. Sharon Ria Fernandez from Goa stars in the film. The film is entirely set in the night.

== Release and reception ==
The film was theatrically released on 25 October 2024.

Akshith Kumar of Telugu Rajyam rated the film 3/5 and wrote, "Overall, this movie will keep the audience glued to their seats in suspense".

== Box office ==
The film ran for fifty days.
