= Happy Happy Ga =

- Promotional poster
- Directed by: Priya Sharan
- Written by: Priya Sharan
- Produced by: Durga Prasad Vadlamudi
- Dialogues by: Anil Ravipudi
- Starring: Varun Sandesh; Vega; Saranya Mohan
- Cinematography: Venky A. Darshan
- Music by: Mani Sharma
- Production company: Oceian Films
- Release date: 20 October 2010
- Country: India
- Language: Telugu

Happy Happy Ga (transl. Happy, happily) is a 2010 Indian Telugu-language romantic drama film directed by Priya Sharan and starring Varun Sandesh, Vega and Saranya Mohan. The film was released to negative reviews and marked Sandesh's third consecutive failure after Kurradu (2009) and Maro Charitra (2010). It also marked Saranya Mohan's last Telugu film till date.

== Cast ==
- Varun Sandesh as Santhosh
- Saranya Mohan as Priya
- Vega as Pooja D'Souza
- P. Ravishankar as Suri
- Saptagiri as Malli
- Ali as Varun Jet Li
- M. S. Narayana as Pooja's uncle
- Rajitha as Diana
- Telangana Shakuntala as Inspector Sumathi
- Shankar Melkote as Doctor

== Soundtrack ==
The music was composed by Mani Sharma with lyrics by Sirivennela Seetharama Sastry. The song "Guzarish" from Ghajini (2008) is parodied by Ali.

- "Aagaleka" - Roja
- "Gundello" - Karthik
- "Madhuranubhavama" - Hemachandra
- "Navvalante" - Haricharan, Rita
- "Putukku Jara Jar" - Hemachandra, Deepthi Chary
- "Yeduraiyeh" - Rahul Nambiar

== Reception ==
A critic from Rediff.com wrote that "All in all, Happy Happy ga has a slightly different ending. Other than that, it is a usual love story". A critic from IBN Live wrote that "Although the ending of the movie is a bit different, Priya Sharan’s Happy Happy Ga is yet another addition to the long list of love stories that are churned out day in and day out in Tollywood".
