= Naa Wife Missing =

2026 film by Srikar Nayan

- Official release poster
- Directed by: Swathi Prakash Matripragada
- Written by: Umarji Anuradha; Aditya Bhargav; Mandala Srinivasa
- Produced by: Siva Kantamaneni; R. Venkateswara Rao
- Starring: Varun Sandesh; Shweta Basu Prasad
- Cinematography: Satish Kumar NS
- Edited by: Sai Babu Talari
- Music by: Sai Karthik
- Production company: Light House Cinema Magic
- Distributed by: Aha
- Release date: 22 October 2026
- Running time: 99 minutes
- Country: India
- Language: Telugu

Naa Wife Missing (transl. My wife is missing) is a 2026 Indian Telugu-language thriller film directed by Swathi Prakash Matripragada. It stars Varun Sandesh and Shweta Basu Prasad. The plot follows Balu (Sandesh) and Swapna (Prasad) who get married through arranged marriage. However, things go haywire in their already strained relationship when Swapna goes missing.

The film began its production in May 2026 in Hyderabad with Sandesh and Swapna reuniting after 18 years following Kotha Bangaru Lokam (2008). The film has music scored by Sai Karthik.

Naa Wife Missing was released on 22 October 2026, on the streaming platform Aha.

== Cast ==
- Varun Sandesh as Balu
- Shweta Basu Prasad as Swapna
- Mohith as Aban, Swapna's boyfriend
- Praveen as the Police Officer
- Jabardasth Sathya Sri as the Police Officer

== Production ==
In April 2026, 10TV reported that actors Varun Sandesh and Shweta Basu Prasad, who earlier paired together in college-based romantic drama Kotha Bangaru Lokam (2008), are set to re-unite in an untitled project after 18 years. The film began its production in May 2026 in Hyderabad, with the title announced as Naa Wife Missing. Incidentally, Sandesh and Prasad play Balu and Swapna in this film which are the same character names as in Kotha Bangaru Lokam.

== Release ==
Naa Wife Missing was released on 22 October 2026, on the streaming platform Aha.

== Reception ==
=== Critical reception ===
Sunil Boddula of News18 Telugu, rated the film 2.75/5 stars and called it a "decent family thriller." NTV Telugu's Bharghav Chaganti opined the film was too "slow-paced" for a thriller. A reviewer from Eenadu identified the performances and technical aspects of the film as positive, while criticizing the screenplay and pacing. Another reviewer from Sakshi, also echoed the same while writing, "director Swathi Prakash has picked a routine story and shot it with brilliant technical aspects. [sic]"
