= Saradaga Ammayitho =

- Directed by: Bhanu Shankar
- Produced by: Pattikonda Kumara Swamy
- Starring: Varun Sandesh; Nisha Agarwal; Suman
- Music by: Ravi Varma
- Distributed by: Sri Kumara Swamy Productions
- Release date: 14 June 2013
- Country: India
- Language: Telugu

Saradaga Ammayitho (transl. Fun with Girl) is a 2013 Telugu-language film directed by Bhanu Shankar starring Varun Sandesh and Nisha Agarwal in the lead roles. Pattikonda Kumara Swamy produced this movie on Sri Kumara Swamy Productions Banner while Ravi Varma scored the music. This is the second collaboration of Varun Sandesh and Nisha Agarwal after their hit movie, Yemaindi Ee Vela (2010). The film released on 14 June 2013.

== Plot ==
The film begins with Santosh coming to confess his story to a church father. Before his confession, he suggests to tell his story to his best friend Peetambaram because he cannot bear to hear the sins of today's youth and that's why he diverted him to his best friend. Then Santosh meets Peetambaram and his wife Andallu. He narrates his story to both of them, they hear his story on the belief that they will console his pain and god will offer them a child.

Santosh is a playboy who always thinks about girls and doesn't believe in marriage. His father is worried about his attitude. Santosh has a dream, i.e. there are only girls in the world which he only wants to stay with. One day Santosh meets a girl, Geetha at his friend's wedding and tries to woo her, but she doesn't fall for his tricks, then he focuses completely on her, tries hard to woo her again, but his trials were in vain. Then he approaches her in the name of love. Both become friends in this process, sometimes in the wooing he crosses his limits, even though she apologises to him. One day, she learns about his attitude toward girls and his intentions towards her, she cuts him off then he lies to her that he has changed and really loves her and thinks about no girl other than her. Then she puts some tests on him to prove his love is sincere. He accepts the challenge. In the process, he manages to stay in the girls' hostel for a particular period of time. He feels happy that his dream is coming true. Then after some days with a comical circumstances he understands slowly that the world is miserable without any human relationships. He understands the value of women, starts respecting them. He really changes his attitude and starts friendships with those girls, he even makes friendship with Geetha again. One day Santosh's long lost girl's (earlier Santosh's parents fix marriage with her but Santosh brainwashes her not to marry and enjoy with the boys like him) husband tries to kill himself, then he discovers she had affairs with other men. He apologises for his actions to them and he sets right their relationship. Geetha was very impressed with his behaviour and says he passed her tests. This time, Santosh really falls for her and he wants to express his feelings toward her. But from that day onward, Geetha disappears. After completion of the flashback, he says that he really loves her and he doesn't know the reason why she abandoned him. He told his story to them because he may find out her if he confessed his story in front of gods.

Meanwhile, in a rehabilitation centre, Dr. Anjali gives a presentation on the subject of obsessive compulsive disorder (OCD) she says that she treated Santosh without knowing him with the help of her colleagues and sends her report to US to achieve a fellowship on her treatment. One day suddenly, Anjali sees Santosh in the rehabilitation center for treatment on mental disability. Then she feels bad about her treatment style. Her rival doctors take it as a chance to prove her wrong and started treating him under their observation. After some days, Ekaambaram and Andallu come to look for her distant relative in the center, finds him, then he says that he is actually acting as a mentally disabled patient to find her whereabouts through his father because he requested her to treat him on his disorder. Then he came to win her heart with the sincere attempts. Andallu says to Santosh that after hearing his story, she became pregnant happy to hear this, he started to try to impress her again. After some comical situations, Anjali realised that she loves Santosh, decides to accept his proposal, then a fire accident took place in the center, Santosh successfully rescues her and confesses everything to her. She accepts his apologies and proposal and finally they unite.

== Cast ==
- Varun Sandesh as Santosh
- Nisha Agarwal as Geetha / Dr. Anjali
- Suman as Santosh's father
- K. Vishwanath (cameo)
- Ali as Peethambaram
- Mumaith Khan as Andallu
- Dharmavarapu Subramanyam as Dr. Ekambaram
- M. S. Narayana as Doctor at Mental Hospital
- Krishna Bhagavaan as Dr. Bhagvan
- Surekha Vani as Dr. Surekha
- Srinivasa Reddy
- Charmy Kaur (cameo)

== Production ==
The director thought in January 2012 to do this movie with Telugu actor Nithiin and he thought to put the female lead as Bollywood serial actress Sriti Jha, but the actress refused.

Later the director said Varun would be perfect for this movie, but the director did not know whom to select as a female role, so thought Nisha was perfect, because the Telugu cinema liked this pair.

== Soundtrack ==
The music was composed by Ravi Varma and released by Puri Sangeet.

Saradaga Ammayitho

Soundtrack album by Ravi Varma
- Released: 5 May 2013
- Recorded: 2013
- Genre: Soundtrack
- Length: 26:42
- Label: Puri Sangeet
- Producer: Ravi Varma

Track list
No.	Title	Singer(s)	Length
1.	"Etuchoosina Ammaayile"	Ravi Varma	3:38
2.	"Oolaallaaa"	Swetha Mohan	3:55
3.	"Nanne Koddiga Preminchu"	Baba Sehgal	3:16
4.	"Idento Ilaage Untunda (Version 1)"	Rajesh	4:00
5.	"Give Me One Chance"	Ravi Varma	1:34
6.	"Mallepoolu Pettindi"	Pranavi, Suri Pattipaka	4:02
7.	"Saradaaga Ammaayitho"	Sagar	2:71
8.	"Idento Ilaage Untunda (Version 2)"	Ravi Varma	4:00
Total length:			26:42

== Reception ==
A critic from The Times of India rated the film 2 out of 5 stars and wrote that "The director worked out his script well but missed making full use of the few scenes which had a suspense element in them.".
