= Lucky Lakshman =

- Poster
- Directed by: AR Abhi
- Written by: AR Abhi
- Produced by: Haritha Gogineni
- Starring: Syed Sohel; Mokksha; Devi Prasad; Raja Ravindra
- Cinematography: I. Andrew
- Edited by: Prawin Pudi
- Music by: Anup Rubens
- Production company: Dattatreya Media
- Distributed by: Tips Official; Dattatreya Media
- Release date: 30 December 2022
- Running time: 132 minutes
- Country: India
- Language: Telugu

Lucky Lakshman is a 2022 Indian Telugu-language romantic family drama film written and directed by AR Abhi and produced by Haritha Gogineni under the banner of Dattatreya Media. The film stars Syed Sohel as the titular character alongside Mokksha, Devi Prasad, Raja Ravindra, Sameer Hasan, Kadambari Kiran, Sridevi Kumar, Janshi and others. The film's music and soundtrack album is composed by Anup Rubens, and the film was released on 30 December 2022.

== Cast ==
- Syed Sohel as Lakshman "Lucky"
- Mokksha as Shreya
- Devi Prasad as Lucky's father
- Raja Ravindra as MLA
- Sameer as Coffee Shop Owner
- Kadambari Kiran
- Sridevi Kumar
- Shani Salmon

== Soundtrack ==
The film's score and soundtrack album is composed by Anup Rubens and the music rights were acquired by Tips Telugu.

No.	Title	Lyrics	Singer(s)	Length
1.	"Lucky Lakshman (title song)"	Bhaskarabhatla	Ram Miriyala, Hari Priya Maranganti	4:34
2.	"Oo Meri Jaan"	Bhaskarabhatla	Anurag Kulkarni	4:02
3.	"Premo Yemo"	Haritha Gogineni	Ramya Behara	3:42
4.	"College Song"	Bhaskarabhatla	Rahul Sipligunj, Roll Rida	3:25

== Reception ==
A critic from The Times of India wrote that the film "has a regular plot oscillating between love and ambition with a few engaging moments". A critic from NTV Telugu rated the film 2.25 out of 5.
