= Syed Sohel =

Indian television and film actor

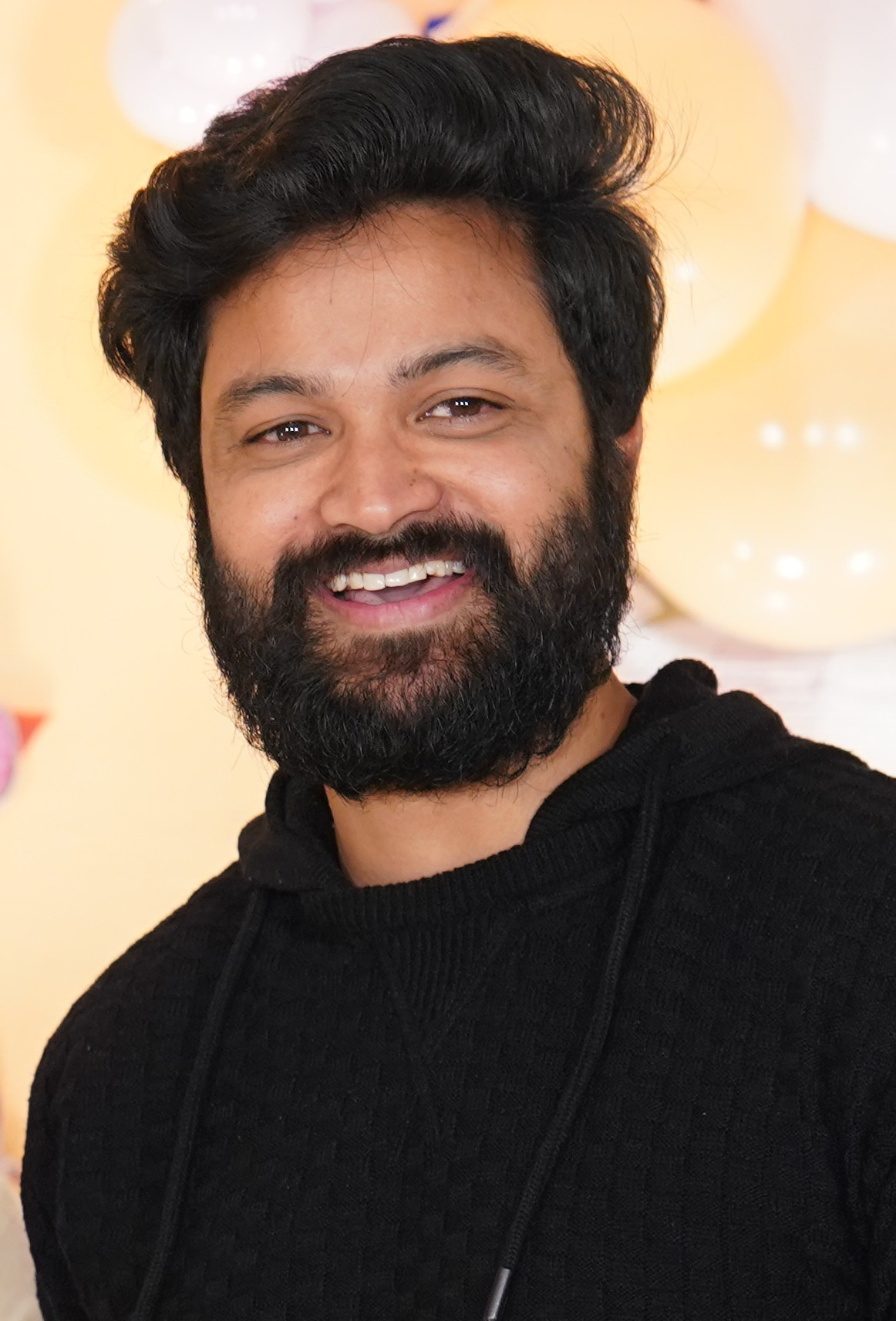
- Syed Sohel in 2025
- Born: Syed Sohel Ryan; 18 April 1991 (age 35); Karimnagar, Andhra Pradesh, India (now in Telangana, India)
- Education: Osmania University, Hyderabad, India
- Occupations: Film actor; television personality; playback singer; social activist; producer
- Years active: 2008–present
- Organization(s): • Sohi Helping Hands • Katha Veruntadhi Productions
- Known for: Bigg Boss Telugu 4

Syed Sohel Ryan (born 18 April 1991) is an Indian actor who works in Telugu films. He made his lead debut with the film Music Magic (2013). He also acted in television series Krishnaveni (2016). In 2020, he participated in the TV reality show Bigg Boss Telugu 4 as a contestant and become as a finalist.

== Early life ==
Sohel was born on 18 April 1991, he was born Hyderabad, Telangana, India. He completed his early schooling from Silver Oaks International School, Hyderabad, India, after that, he graduated from Osmania University. Sohel has a younger brother Syed Sabeel and his father is Syed Salim. His mother died on 17 September 2024.

== Career ==
Sohel began his career with a minor role in Kotha Bangaru Lokam (2008). He made his lead debut with the film Music Magic (2013), which is about rock music. The film was released to mixed-to-negative reviews. He then went on to act in several low key films such as The Bells (2015), Cine Mahal (2017) and Konapuram Lo Jarigina Katha (2019). He acted in the daily soaps Pasupu Kumkuma (2010-2014), Nathicharami (2014-2016) and Krishnaveni (2020). He was a contestant of Bigg Boss Telugu 4 in 2020 before he walked out of the show with Rs. 25 lakh.

In 2021, He received the Brihaspathi Rising Star Awards at Sensational Star category for his short film contests. Sohel also founded "Sohi Helping Hands" and had been running various social service programs. He showed his generosity by providing essential goods as well as financial assistance to poor people during difficult times amid covid pandemic and he was honored with the Rising Star Award by ABC Foundation for his social service works.

He then starred in Lucky Lakshman (2022), which released to mixed reviews. Regarding his performance, a critic wrote that "Playing Lucky Lakshman, he once again established his acting prowess. The character of Lucky takes a little while to get used to, but it grows on you as the film progresses, making it a successful outing for Sohel" whilst another critic wrote that "Sohel acted well in this, but the story is not set according to its potential. There is no stability in his role". He then starred in Organic Mama Hybrid Alludu (2023), which was released to mixed-to-negative reviews. A critic noted that he and the rest of the cast "do a fine job playing their characters" while bashing the film's story.

Sohel then appeared a pregnant man in Mr. Pregnant, which released to mixed reviews although his performance was termed by critics as one of the film's highlights. One critic noted that "Syed Sohel's portrayal of Gowtham is nothing short of impressive, effectively presenting the complexities of a pregnant man" whilst another critic wrote that "the film belongs to Sohel, who carries the emotional story on his shoulders". His sole release of 2024, Bootcut Balaraju, was released to mixed reviews. One critic noted that "Sohel's performance in Bootcut Balaraju is nothing short of adorable. His prowess in both comedic and emotional scenes shines through, effectively carrying the movie on his capable shoulders" whilst another critic noted that "Sohel brings a carefree charm to his role as a rural, academically disinterested youth facing ridicule".

== Filmography ==
Key
†	Denotes films that have not yet been released

- All films are in Telugu unless otherwise noted.

List of Syed Sohel film credits
Year	Title	Role	Notes	Ref.
2008	Kotha Bangaru Lokam	Balu's classmate	Uncredited role	
2012	Cameraman Gangatho Rambabu	Rambabu's supporter	Uncredited role	
2013	Seethamma Vakitlo Sirimalle Chettu	Wedding guest	Uncredited role	
2013	Anthaka Mundu Aa Tarvatha	Rohit	Uncredited role	
2013	Music Magic	Sanjay	Debut film as lead role; credited as Rahul	
2013	D for Dopidi	Rahul	Cameo appearance	
2015	The Bells	Bharath / Bhagath	Dual role; credited as Ryan Rahul	
2016	Janatha Garage	Anand's friend	Uncredited role in "Pranaamam" and "Rock On Bro" songs	
2017	Cine Mahal	Vinod Babu		
2018	Super Sketch	Ashrith	Cameo appearance	
2019	Konapuram Lo Jarigina Katha	Shiva		
2020	Eureka	Revanth		
2022	Lucky Lakshman	Lucky Lakshman		
2023	Organic Mama Hybrid Alludu	Vijay		
2023	Mr. Pregnant	Gautham		
2024	Bootcut Balaraju	Balaraju	Also as co-producer	
TBA	Karman †	TBA	Filming	

=== Short film ===
Year	Title	Role	Notes	Ref.
2016	Motadi Pelli Choopulu	Harish	Also singer of the song "Ohh Manasa"	
2016	Ontarini	Suriya		
2017	Nene Kaani	Shiva		
2018	C/o Confidence	Dhananjay		
2020	Akbar Most Wanted	Inspector Akbar		

=== Music video ===
Year	Title	Singer(s)	Co-casting	Ref.
2020	"Break Up Cover Song"	Himself	Lamya Sri Perugu	
2021	"Avarura Aa Pilla"	LV Revanth	Mehabob Dil Se & Amy Aela	
2022	"Maya Chesesave"	Afroz Ali	Lavanya Anthanna	
2023	"Gammat"	Afroz Ali & Akshaya Pathipati	Phani Poojitha	

== Television ==
Year	Title	Role	Notes	Ref.
2010–2014	Pasupu Kumkuma	Rahul	Television drama serial on Zee Telugu	
2014–2016	Nathicharami	Abhi	Television drama serial on Gemini TV	
2016–2020	Krishnaveni	Arjun	Television drama serial on Star Maa	
2020	Bigg Boss Telugu 4	Contestant	Reality show on Star Maa; 2nd runner up	
2021	Guntur Mirchi	Shravan	Drama serial on YouTube; Special appearance	
2022	Alitho Saradaga	Himself	Talk show on ETV; Guest appearance	
2021–2023	Sixth Sense	Himself	Game show on Star Maa; Participant	
2025	Bigg Boss Telugu 9	Himself	Reality show on Star Maa; Guest appearance	

== Awards and nominations ==
Year	Awards	Category	Works	Result	Ref.
2021	Brihaspathi Rising Star Awards	Sensational Star	Short Films Contest	Won	
2021	Rising Star Award by ABC Foundation	Social Worker	—N/a	Won	
