= Ramam Raghavam =

Indian film by Dhanraj Koranani

- Release Date poster
- Directed by: Dhanraj Koranani
- Written by: Siva Prasad Yanala
- Produced by: Prudhvi Polavarapu
- Starring: Samuthirakani; Dhanraj Koranani; Harish Uthaman
- Cinematography: Durga Prasad Kolli
- Edited by: Marthand K. Venkatesh
- Music by: Arun Chiluveru
- Production company: Slate Pencil Stories
- Release date: 21 February 2025
- Country: India
- Language: Telugu

Ramam Raghavam is a 2025 Indian Telugu-language drama thriller film directed by Dhanraj Koranani in his directorial debut. The film features Samuthirakani, Dhanraj Koranani, Harish Uthaman, Satya, Srinivas Reddy, Pruthviraj, Mokksha, and Pramodini. The film was also partially filmed in Tamil. It was released on 21 February 2025.

== Plot ==
The story begins in Amalapuram, located in the Konaseema district, where Dasarath Ramam, an honest government employee at the Amalapuram Registrar's Office, is known for his integrity, never asking for more than his due salary. In stark contrast, his son Raghava, born to this principled man, has grown up indulging in vices from an early age, including gambling, betting, and accumulating debts.

Despite his father's continuous efforts to reform him through strict discipline, Raghava's behavior remains unchanged. Eventually, driven by the desire to earn quick money through shortcuts, Raghava forges his father's signature. This deceit taints Rama's reputation with corruption, a burden he finds intolerable. In response, Rama expels Raghava from the home. Consumed by his addictions, debts, and relentless punishment, Raghava ultimately resolves to kill his father, believing that doing so will secure the government job, insurance payouts, and the family's remaining assets for himself.

His father learns of Raghava's plan and kills himself so that his son can have a better life. This leaves Raghava heartbroken for the rest of his life, and he wishes to be reborn as his father's chappal.

== Cast ==
- Samuthirakani as Dasaradh Ramam
- Dhanraj Koranani as Raghava
- Harish Uthaman as Deva, Raghava's friend
- Satya as Anji, Raghava's best friend
- Vennela Kishore as Satyam
- Srinivas Reddy as Atin Raju
- Sunil as Naidu
- Prudhvi Raj as Kasinadh, Dasaradh Ramam's rival
- Sudharshan as Raghunath
- Mokksha as Varsha
- Pramodini as Kamalamma, Dasaradh Ramam's wife
- Vasu Inturi as Bunk Mohan
- Raghu Babu as Raja
- Rachha Ravi as Ramu

== Production ==
Ramam Raghavam marks the directorial debut of Dhanraj Koranani, a comedian-turned-actor who also plays the main role in the film. The movie was shot predominately in Telugu and partially in Tamil, and the story for this film penned by Siva Prasad Yanala who is also the director for Vimanam, and Durga Prasad Kolli helming the cinematography and Marthand K. Venkatesh editing.

== Soundtrack ==
The original soundtrack for the film was composed by Arun Chiluveru, and the first single that was released was "Telsindha Nedu".

Track listing (Telugu)
| No. | Title | Lyrics | Music | Singer(s) | Length |
|---|---|---|---|---|---|
| 1. | "Telisindha Nedu" | Ramajogayya Sastry | Arun Chiluveru | Sreekanth Hariharan | 4:10 |
| Total length: | | | | | 04:10 |

Track listing (Tamil)
| No. | Title | Lyrics | Music | Singer(s) | Length |
|---|---|---|---|---|---|
| 1. | "Kola Saami Poala" | Yugabharathi | Arun Chiluveru | Sreekanth Hariharan | 4:10 |
| Total length: | | | | | 04:10 |

== Release and reception ==
Ramam Raghavam was released on 21 February 2025.

The New Indian Express critic stated that "At the same time, you are only reminded of how much more this film could have achieved." OTTPlay critic "If you ignore the shaky start, the family drama can be given a shot for its moving ending"
