= Kotha Bangaru Lokam =

Kotta Bangaru Lokam
- Directed by: Srikanth Addala
- Written by: Srikanth Addala
- Produced by: Dil Raju
- Starring: Varun Sandesh; Shweta Basu Prasad
- Cinematography: Chota K. Naidu
- Edited by: Marthand K. Venkatesh
- Music by: Mickey J. Meyer
- Production company: Sri Venkateswara Creations
- Distributed by: Sri Venkateswara Creations
- Release date: 9 October 2008
- Country: India
- Language: Telugu
- Budget: ₹3.5 crore
- Box office: ₹8 crore distributors' share

Kotha Bangaru Lokam (transl. A new golden world) is a 2008 Indian Telugu-language romantic drama film written and directed by debutant Srikanth Addala, and produced by Dil Raju. The film stars Varun Sandesh and Shweta Basu Prasad with Prakash Raj, Jayasudha, Ahuti Prasad, Rajitha, Brahmanandam, and Rao Ramesh in supporting roles. The film's music was composed by Mickey J. Meyer and cinematography by Chota K. Naidu.

The film was released on 9 October 2008. The film received two Nandi Awards and five Filmfare Awards South.

Kotha Bangaru Lokam was commercially successful at the box office.

== Plot ==
Balu is the only son of a humble middle-class couple. Swapna is the daughter of a strict, wealthy couple. Both study at a residential college in Visakhapatnam. They soon fall for each other but question whether their relationship is attraction or love. Swapna is taken away from the college after a picture of them gets published in the newspaper. Balu is asked to bring his father, or else he would not be allowed to take the exams. He goes home and tells his parents a completely different story. While his parents keep thinking he is studying for his exam, he is busy daydreaming about Swapna and searching for her. Finally, he brings his father to the college, not to pave his way for the exam but to see Swapna. His father is clueless about what is happening and still believes Balu.

Balu meets Swapna and her parents. Swapna's parents arrange another marriage for her. Balu's father learns of his behavior from his friend. Though disappointed, he believes children should be treated with love, not fear and scolding. While leaving on a train, Balu's father dies in an accident. On the same day, Swapna runs away from her house to live with Balu, but Balu does not show up because of his father's death. Balu thinks Swapna is with her father, and her father thinks that she is with Balu. Four years later, they both miss each other. Balu and Swapna's father meet at a railroad station. Balu finds out Swapna was not with her father, and Swapna's father finds out she was not with Balu. Balu's mother arrives and tells Balu that Swapna was with one of his lecturers, who helped him realize the meaning of life. She kept them away so they could realize what life means and that patience comes only from true love. Now that they are mature enough, no one can stop them. Swapna and Balu reunite, and Swapna reunites with her father.

== Cast ==
- Varun Sandesh as Balu
- Shweta Basu Prasad as Swapna
- Prakash Raj as Vishnu Murthy, Balu's father
- Jayasudha as Balu's mother
- Brahmanandam as Rai Pawar, college principal
- Ahuti Prasad as Swapna's father
- Rajitha as Swapna's mother
- Rao Ramesh as Lecturer
- Gautam Raju
- Phanikanth
- Rajababu
- Syed Sohel as Balu's classmate (uncredited role)
- Sai Srujan Pelluri as Balu's classmate (uncredited role)

== Soundtrack ==
Kotha Bangaru Lokam

Soundtrack album by Mickey J Meyer
- Released: 23 August 2008 (India)
- Recorded: 2008
- Genre: Feature film soundtrack
- Length: 27:46
- Language: Telugu
- Label: Aditya Music
- Producer: Mickey J Meyer

Mickey J Meyer chronology
Hare Ram (2008)	Kotha Bangaru Lokam (2008)	Jolly Days (2009)

The soundtrack of the film was released on 23 August 2008. It had music scored by composer, Mickey J Meyer. The music was launched on the evening of 23 August 2008 at State Art Gallery, Hyderabad by Jr. NTR, Prabhas and Allu Arjun.

Telugu Track-List
No.	Title	Lyrics	Singer(s)	Length
1.	"Kalasalalo"	Srikanth Addala	Krishna Chaitanya, Aditya, Siddhartha, Kranthi, Sasikiran	3:56
2.	"Nijangaa Nenena"	Ananta Sriram	Karthik	5:21
3.	"Confusion"	Ananta Sriram	Krishna Chaitanya, Mickey J Meyer	4:17
4.	"Nenani Neevani"	Sirivennela Seetharama Sastry	Shweta Pandit	5:12
5.	"Ok Anesa"	Sirivennela Seetharama Sastry	Naresh Iyer, Kalyani Nair	4:35
6.	"Nee Prashnalu"	Sirivennela Seetharama Sastry	S. P. Balasubrahmanyam	4:25
Total length:				27:46

Ithu Njangalude Lokam

Soundtrack album by Mickey J Meyer
- Released: 2009
- Recorded: 2009
- Genre: Feature film soundtrack
- Length: 27:57
- Language: Malayalam
- Label: Universal Music India
- Producer: Mickey J Meyer

Malayalam Track-List
No.	Title	Lyrics	Singer(s)	Length
1.	"Kalashaalakal (Kanninte Karuthil)"	Khader Hassan	Afsal	3:53
2.	"Ninakkaay"	Siju Thuravoor	Vineeth Sreenivasan	5:34
3.	"Confusion"	Siju Thuravoor	Ajay Sathyan	4:20
4.	"Mizhi Pootti Olichaal"	Siju Thuravoor	Anwar Sadath	4:27
5.	"Oh En Manasse"	Khader Hassan	Manjari, Vidhu Prathap	4:33
6.	"Thinkalum Aambalum"	Siju Thuravoor	Shobha	5:10
Total length:				27:57

== Release ==
The film was remade in Kannada as Cheluvina Chilipili (2009) by S. Narayan starring Pankaj and Roopika.

== Reception ==
Rediff.com critic Radhika Rajamani rated the film 3 stars out of 5 and opined that Addala has written an interesting screenplay for a routine storyline. On performances, she wrote: "Varun Sandesh and Shwetha Prasad wow with their liveliness, energy and their teenage innocence. Both are sprightly and full of joie de vivre, necessary for the role as teenage students and are the right choice for the roles".

Idlebrain.com, which rated the film 4/5, stated: "The debutant director Srikanth Addala comes up with a script that offers lot of freshness".

== Accolades ==
Award (Note: Awards, festivals and organizations are in alphabetical order.)	Date of ceremony (Note: Date is linked to the article about the awards held that year, wherever possible.)	Category	Recipient(s)	Result	Ref.
Filmfare Awards South	31 July 2009	Best Film – Telugu	Kotha Bangaru Lokam – Sri Venkateswara Creations	Nominated	
Filmfare Awards South	31 July 2009	Best Cinematographer – South	Chota K. Naidu	Won	
Filmfare Awards South	31 July 2009	Best Actress – Telugu	Shweta Basu Prasad	Nominated	
Filmfare Awards South	31 July 2009	Best Supporting Actor – Telugu	Prakash Raj	Nominated	
Filmfare Awards South	31 July 2009	Best Supporting Actress – Telugu	Jayasudha	Won	
Filmfare Awards South	31 July 2009	Best Music Director – Telugu	Mickey J. Meyer	Won	
Filmfare Awards South	31 July 2009	Best Male Playback Singer – Telugu	Karthik - (for "Nijangaa Nenenaa")	Won	
Filmfare Awards South	31 July 2009	Best Female Playback Singer – Telugu	Shweta Pandit - (for "Nenani Neevani")	Won	
Nandi Awards	17 March 2010	Best Cinematographer	Chota K. Naidu	Won	
Nandi Awards	17 March 2010	Best Music Director	Mickey J. Meyer	Won	
Santosham Film Awards	21 August 2009	Best Musical Film	Kotha Bangaru Lokam – Sri Venkateswara Creations	Won	
Santosham Film Awards	21 August 2009	Best Cinematographer	Chota K. Naidu	Won	
Santosham Film Awards	21 August 2009	Best Dubbing Artist – Female	Haritha	Won	
Santosham Film Awards	21 August 2009	Best Publicity designer	Anil – Bhanu	Won	
