= I Hate You (film) =

2024 Indian romantic thriller film

- Promotional poster
- Directed by: Anjee Ram
- Written by: Anjee Ram
- Produced by: Naggaraz
- Starring: Karthik Raju; Mokksha; Sherry Agarwal
- Cinematography: S. Murali Mohan Reddy
- Edited by: J Prathap Kumar
- Music by: Swaakar
- Production company: Sri Gayathri Entertainments
- Distributed by: SKML Motion Picture
- Release date: 2 February 2024
- Country: India
- Language: Telugu

I Hate You is a 2024 Indian Telugu-language romantic thriller film written and directed by Anji Ram. The film stars Karthik Raju, Mokksha and Sherry Agarwal in the lead roles.The film was produced by Naggaraz under the banner of Sri Gayathri Entertainments.

== Cast ==
- Karthik Raju
- Mokksha
- Sherry Agarwal

== Production ==
The film was produced by Naggaraz under the banner of Sri Gayathri Entertainments. The cinematography was done by J Prathap Kumar, while editing was handled by S Murali Mohan Reddy. The trailer of the film was released 20 January 2024.

== Reception ==
A critic from Sakshi Post stated that "I Hate You won't disappoint you if you watch it with low expectations. Any rom-com fan will love it.".

Deccan Chronicle critic wrote that "Director Anji Ram crafts a plot that navigates the complexities of romantic thrillers effectively."

Suhas Sistu of The Hans India rated 2.75 out of 5 and wrote that "The rich production values, well-chosen cast, and picturesque locations contribute to making this movie a satisfying watch for fans of the romantic thriller genre."

News18 critic gave 2.5 out of 5 and noted that " Overall, it is a remarkable movie in the romantic thriller genre."
