= Mokksha =

Indian actress and dancer

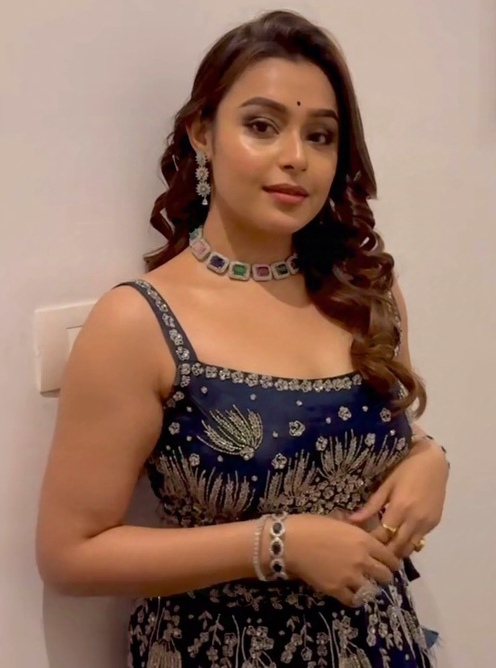
- Mokksha in 2024
- Born: Pritha Sengupta; Barrackpore, West Bengal, India
- Occupations: Actress; classical dancer; teacher
- Years active: 2019–present

Pritha Sengupta, professionally credited as Mokksha, is an Indian film actress and classical dancer, who started her career in Bengali films and she also appeared in Tamil, Telugu and Malayalam films. Her debut Bengali film lead role is Karma (2020); she made debuts in Tamil with Yevaal (2022), Telugu with Lucky Lakshman (2022) and Malayalam with Kallanum Bhagavathiyum (2023).

== Early life ==
Mokksha was born as Pritha Sengupta and hails from Barrackpore, in the North 24 Parganas district of West Bengal. She studied at St. Claret School, Barrackpore, and at the Douglas Memorial Higher Secondary School, Barrackpore.

Mokksha worked as a teacher at St. Augustine's Day School, Barrackpore, where she also taught dance. She pursued her studies while working and earned a B.Sc. (Honours) degree in Psychology from Asutosh College, Kolkata. She is a trained classical dancer, having studied Bharatanatyam, Kathak, and Odissi.

== Career ==
She started her acting career in the Bengali film industry. In her early career, she appeared in films such as Filter Coffee Liquor Cha and Switzerland. She continued to play supporting roles until she grabbed the lead role in the Bengali film Karma (2020). It was followed by another leading role in the Bengali film Shorshephool. In 2022, she played the female lead role in the psychological thriller Yevaal, a Tamil film based on witchcraft. In the same year, she starred in the Telugu drama Lucky Lakshman. Critic from The Times of India wrote that "Mokksha, as Shreya, did well portraying the quintessential lover".

In the 2023 Telugu romantic drama Neethone Nenu, she played Seetha, one of the two female leads. A critic from The Hans India noted that "Mokksha leaves a positive impression with her performance". Mokksha auditioned and was selected for her debut Malayalam film, Kallanum Bhagavathiyum (2023), directed by East Coast Vijayan, in which she played the title role of Bhagavathy. In their review, OnManorama praised her for "a spectacular performance as the titular character".

In 2024, she played the female lead role in the Telugu romantic thriller I Hate You. She also played the female lead role in her second Telugu film, the romantic drama Alanaati Ramchandrudu (2024), directed by Chilukuri Akash Reddy. She collaborated with East Coast Vijayan again in the horror film Chithini (2024). She played the title role of a malevolent spirit.

== Personal life ==
Mokksha was born to her parents, Partha Sengupta and Rina. She is a Hindu. In August 2024, she performed a street dance to a song by poet Kazi Nazrul Islam at Santoshpur, Kolkata, to express solidarity for the protest against the 2024 Kolkata rape and murder. It went viral over the social media platforms.

== Filmography ==
=== Films ===
Key
†	Denotes films that have not yet been released

Year	Title	Role	Language	Notes	Ref.
2019	Filter Coffee Liquor Cha	Rai	Bengali	Support role	
2020	Switzerland		Bengali	Support role	
2020	Karma	Sanjana Bose	Bengali	Lead debut film	
2021	Shorshephool	Indrani	Bengali		
2022	Lucky Lakshman	Shreya	Telugu	Telugu debut film	
2023	Neethone Nenu	Seetha	Telugu		
2023	Kallanum Bhagavathiyum	Lord Durga	Malayalam	Malayalam debut film	
2024	I Hate You	Indhu	Telugu		
2024	Alanaati Ramchandrudu	Dharani	Telugu		
2024	Chithini	Seetha	Malayalam		
2025	Ramam Raghavam	Varsha	Telugu		
2026	Gatta Kusthi 2	Meenu	Tamil	Tamil debut film	
2026	Bouma	Rose	Malayalam		

=== Television ===
Year	Title	Note
2022	Rawkto Bilaap	Hoichoi web series
