= Kallanum Bhagavathiyum =

2023 Indian film

- Theatrical release poster
- Directed by: East Coast Vijayan
- Screenplay by: East Coast Vijayan; K. V. Anil
- Story by: K. V. Anil
- Based on: Kallanum Bhagavathiyum by K. V. Anil
- Produced by: East Coast Vijayan
- Starring: Vishnu Unnikrishnan; Mokksha; Anusree
- Cinematography: Ratheesh Ram
- Edited by: Johnkutty
- Music by: Ranjin Raj
- Production company: East Coast Communications
- Distributed by: East Coast Reel & Real Entertainments
- Release date: 31 March 2023
- Running time: 129 minutes
- Country: India
- Language: Malayalam

Kallanum Bhagavathiyum (transl. Thief and the Goddess) is a 2023 Indian Malayalam-language fantasy comedy film co-written, directed, produced and distributed by East Coast Vijayan. It is an adaptation of the novel of the same name by K. V. Anil. The film stars Vishnu Unnikrishnan, Mokksha, and Anusree. It also features Rajesh Madhavan, Prem Kumar, Salim Kumar, Maala Parvathy, Jayan Cherthala, Srikant Murali, and Noby Marcose in supporting roles. The film's music was composed by Ranjin Raj.

Principal photography was carried out over a period of 37 days, from November 2022 to January 2023, in Palakkad, Kerala. Kallanum Bhagavathiyum was released in theatres on 31 March 2023.

== Plot ==
Mathappan Unni, who was only known as a thief by committing petty crimes, decide to end his life. Having achieved nothing financially, Mathappan decides to steal the Krishna idol from the temple as a last resort.

Unfulfilled to take back the house mortgaged by his father, Priyamani leaves the house one night. Priya meets Mathappan, who runs away and takes shelter in the church to avoid being caught during the robbery attempt, in the church graveyard. The two, who were hiding together, share their own plight. As a last ditch effort to escape, Priya advises Mathappan to steal an idol of Bhagwati, abandoned in a forested cave temple across the river.

After swimming across the river and stealing the idol out of the stormy forest inhabited by poisonous snakes and wild animals, the goddess asked only one thing for Mathappan, a place to stay until the re-consecration of the temple. Later on, an invisible bond forms between the thief and Bhagwati and it changes the entire life of the thief.

== Cast ==
- Vishnu Unnikrishnan as Kallan Mathappan
  - Master Hattim as Young Mathappan
- Mokksha as Bhagavathi
- Anusree as Priyamani
  - Nyshana Fathima K K as Young Priyamani
- Johny Antony as Shankaran, Enchanter
- Althaf Salim as Ambi, Enchanter's Assistant
- Rajesh Madhavan as Vallabhan
- Prem Kumar as SI Sudheendran
- Maala Parvathy as Lakshmi, Priyamani's Mother
- Srikant Murali as Balan Mash
- Jayashankar as Mathappan's father
- Jayan Cherthala as Ananthan, Priyamani's father
- Jayakumar Parameswaran Pillai as Autodriver Kodamani
- Noby Marcose as Police Kumaran
- Chembil Ashokan as Bhaktha Manasan
- Salim Kumar as Sathyan, the Priest
- Jayaprakash Kuloor as Thirumeni
- Ratheesh Guinness as Pathrose (Police)
- Ranjini George as Mathappan's Mother
- Benna John as Vanaja
- Baby Soya as Vasanthi
- Kavitha Baiju as Doctor
- Sneha Chandra as Nurse

== Production ==
The film's title was announced in November 2022. It is an adaptation of the novel Kallanum Bagavathiyum by K. V. Anil. Bengali actress Mokksha made her Malayalam debut with the film. According to Vijayan, "I found Mokksha from the land of Goddess Durga. I felt there was an invisible divine force in Mokksha".

Principal photography of the film began on 23 November 2022. The entire shooting was wrapped on 2 January 2023 in Palakkad. Filming was completed in 37 days. Cinematography was done by Ratheesh Ram, while editor was Johnkutty.

== Soundtrack ==
The film's original score and songs were composed by Ranjin Raj.

Kallanum Bhagavathiyum (Original Motion Picture Soundtrack)
No.	Title	Lyrics	Singer(s)	Length
1.	"Carol Song"	Santhosh Varma	Biju Narayanan	4:53
2.	"Marakkilla Njan"	Santhosh Varma	Karthik	4:45
3.	"Nanmayulla Naadu"	Santhosh Varma	Vidyadharan	3:17
4.	"Sindhooraaruna"	Traditional	Madhu Balakrishnan	1:15
5.	"Nithyanandakari"	Traditional	Madhu Balakrishnan	1:36
6.	"Prabhavathi"	Traditional	Madhu Balakrishnan	0:42
7.	"Sreematha"	Traditional	Divya S. Menon, Bhadra Rajin, Megha	3:17
8.	"Sumukhi"	Traditional	Madhu Balakrishnan	0:53
9.	"Ohm Hreem"	Traditional	Madhu Balakrishnan	1:12
10.	"Yaa Devi"	Traditional	Ranjin Raj	1:18
11.	"Karunai Daivame"	Traditional	Madhu Balakrishnan	1:27
12.	"Namasthe Saranye"	Traditional	Madhu Balakrishnan	3:06
13.	"Thwam"	Traditional	Madhu Balakrishnan	0:51
14.	"Siva Sakthya"	Traditional	Madhu Balakrishnan	0:56
15.	"Ohm Sarvesham"	Traditional	Ranjin Raj	1:44

== Reception ==
A critic from Onmanorama stated that "Kallanum Bhagavathiyum is a small yet entertaining movie that captures the audience's imagination". Critic from Manorama Online opined that it is a beautiful film with good humour, fantasy, visuals and songs, and also praised the performances, particularly that of Unnikrishnan, Mokksha, and Anusree. Critic from Mathrubhumi commented that Kallanum Bhagavathiyum is a visual representation of a beautiful dream, and particularly praised the acting of Mokksha.

Anna Mathews of The Times of India gave 2.5 stars out of 5 stars and stated that it "has a promising, if somewhat old-fashioned premise ... Basically, the characters have not been thoughtfully developed, with storylines falling short". But praised the "chemistry" between Unnikrishnan and Mokksha.
