= Ishtam (2012 film) =

2012 Tamil film by Prem Nizar

- Directed by: Prem Nizar
- Written by: Sampath Nandi
- Based on: Yemaindi Ee Vela (Telugu)
- Produced by: T. Ramesh
- Starring: Vimal; Nisha Agarwal
- Cinematography: Shekhar Joseph
- Music by: S. Thaman
- Production company: Balaji Real Media
- Release date: 25 May 2012
- Running time: 138 minutes
- Country: India
- Language: Tamil

Ishtam (transl. Wish) is a 2012 Indian Tamil-language romance film directed by Prem Nizar and produced by T. Ramesh. A remake of the Telugu film Yemaindi Ee Vela (2010), the film stars Vimal and Nisha Agarwal, while Santhanam, Parvati Nibran, and Anoop Kumar play supporting roles. The music was composed by S. Thaman with cinematography by Shekhar Joseph. The film was released on 25 May 2012.

== Plot ==
Saravanan is a modern city guy, while Sandhya is a modern village girl who comes to the city to find a job. Sandhya and Saravanan first meet while on the way to an interview. At first, they have some disagreements and fight. Then, a friendship blossoms into love, and they have a relationship. They decide to marry, but their parents do not agree. They get married anyway and start living happily at Saravanan's place. They are happy for a few months, but they start to disagree and fight, so they decide to divorce. Both of them go to their parents' house to live separately. Their parents decided to get them new partners. At first they agreed with their parents' decision. But then the love between Sandhya and Saravanan was rekindled since they missed each other. They decided to cancel their second marriages and live together happily.

== Cast ==
- Vimal as Saravanan
- Nisha Agarwal as Sandhya
- Santhanam as Thiyagu
- Parvati Nibran as Nimisha
- Anoop Kumar as Akash
- Pragathi as Saravanan's mother
- Uma Padmanabhan as Sandhya's mother
- Yuvarani as Sandhya's aunt
- Charle as Watchman
- T. V. Rao
- Karate Raja as Shankar
- Namo Narayana
- Swaminathan
- Karate Raja
- Sembuli Jagan
- Kovai Senthil
- Kadugu Ramamoorthy
- Misha Ghoshal as Sandhya's friend (uncredited)

== Production ==
Yemaindi Ee Vela's remake rights were bought by Balaji Real Media and newcomer Prem Nizar, an erstwhile assistant of director Chakri Toleti, was chosen as the director. Ishtam marks a makeover for Vimal, who played a rural youngster in films like Pasanga, Kalavani and Eththan, featuring him as a "modern, city-based man". Kajal Aggarwal's sister Nisha Aggarwal, who played the female lead in the original, was signed to reprise her role, making her debut in Tamil cinema. The film was launched by mid-August 2011, and filming was completed by late September 2011 in a single schedule.

== Soundtrack ==
Ishtam

Soundtrack album by S. Thaman
- Released: 28 February 2012
- Recorded: 2012
- Genre: Soundtrack
- Length: 23:33
- Label: Sony Music India
- Producer: S. Thaman

S. Thaman chronology
Kadhalil Sodhappuvadhu Yeppadi (2015)	Ishtam (2012)	Thadaiyara Thaakka (2012)

The music is composed by S. Thaman who composed the original film. The songs "Dhinnaku Dhin" and "Oru Megam" were reused from Thaman's own compositions: the same named song and "Dhim Thana" from Telugu films Mirapakaay and Kick, respectively.

Track-List
No.	Title	Lyrics	Singer(s)	Length
1.	"Aaruyire"	Na. Muthukumar	Ranjith, Priyadarshini	4:26
2.	"Dhinakku Dhina"	Na. Muthukumar	Rita, M. L. R. Karthikeyan	4:47
3.	"Oru Megam"	Viveka	Divya, M. L. R. Karthikeyan	5:05
4.	"Vaenna Vaenna"	Na. Muthukumar	Rahul Nambiar	5:25
5.	"Enmele Indru"	Viveka	Rahul Nambiar, Megha	3:50
Total length:				23:33
