= Vanga Anil Kumar =

Film publicity designer

- Born: October 7, 1974 (age 51); Amanabol, Nalgonda district, Andhra Pradesh
- Occupation: Film Publicity Designer

Vanga Anil Kumar is a film publicity designer whose screen name is Anil Bhanu along with his partner Bhanu Avirineni. Anil is the co-founder of Anil Bhanu Core Design. He has designed posters and has done film publicity for more than 100 films. There are around 30 yet-to-be-released films for which they are doing publicity right now. Anil joined hands with Bhanu after completing his 2-year multimedia course.

== Filmography ==
Anil Bhanu designed publicity material for nearly 100 films including Telugu and Hindi languages. Below are some of them.

Year	Title	Cast	Director	Notes
2014	Race Gurram	Allu Arjun, Shruti Haasan	Surender Reddy	
2014	Rowdy	Mohan Babu, Vishnu Manchu	Ram Gopal Varma	
2014	Rabhasa	NTR, Samantha	Santosh Srinivas	
2014	1: Nenokkadine	Mahesh Babu, Kriti Sanon	Sukumar	
2014	Yevadu	Ram Charan, Allu Arjun, Shruti Haasan, Amy Jackson	Vamshi Paidipalli	
2014	Karthikeya	Nikhil, Swathi	Chandoo Mondeti	
2014	Basanti	Raja Gautham, Alisha Baig	Chaitanya Dantuluri	
2014	DK Bose	Sundeep Kishan, Nisha Agarwal	AN Bose	
2014	Prathinidhi	Nara Rohit, Shubra Ayyappa	Prashanth Mandava	
2014	Manam	ANR, Nagarjuna Akkineni, Naga Chaitanya	Vikram K Kumar	
2013	Swamy Ra Ra	Nikhil, Swathi	Sudheer Varma	
2013	Seethamma Vakitlo Sirimalle Chettu	Venkatesh, Mahesh Babu	Sreekanth Addala	
2013	Gundello Godari	Aadhi, Lakshmi Manchu, Sundeep Kishan, Tapsee Pannu	Kumar Nagendra	
2013	Backbench Student	Mahath Raghavendra, Piya Bajpai	'Madhura' Sreedhar	
2013	Gouravam	Allu Sirish, Yami Gautam	Radha Mohan	
2013	Dalam	Naveen Chandra, Piya Bajpai	Jeevan Reddy	
2013	Kiss	Adivi Sesh, Priya Banerjee	Adivi Sesh	
2013	Potugadu	Manoj Manchu, Sakshi Choudhary	Pawan Wadeyar	
2013	Satya 2	Sharwanand	Ram Gopal Varma	
2009	Oy!	Siddharth, Shamili	Anand Ranga	
2005	Sarkar	Amitabh Bachchan	Ram Gopal Varma	
