= Induvadana =

2022 film by M. Srinivas Raju

- Theatrical release poster
- Directed by: M. Srinivas Raju
- Screenplay by: M. Srinivasa Raju
- Story by: Aketi Sathish
- Produced by: Madhavi Adurti
- Starring: Varun Sandesh; Farnaz Shetty
- Cinematography: B. Murali Krishna
- Edited by: Kotagiri Venkateswara Rao
- Music by: Chaitu Kolli
- Production company: Sri Balaji Pictures
- Release date: 1 January 2022
- Running time: 134 minutes
- Country: India
- Language: Telugu

Induvadana is a 2022 Indian Telugu-language horror comedy drama film directed by M. Srinivas Raju from the story written by Aketi Sathish. The film features Varun Sandesh and Farnaz Shetty in lead roles. Induvadana was released theatrically on 1 January 2022.

== Cast ==
- Varun Sandesh as Vasu
- Farnaz Shetty as Indu
- Raghu Babu
- Ali
- Dhanraj
- Praveen Raj
- Parvateesam
- Mahesh Vitta
- Surekha Vani
- Nagineedu
- Jyoti Labala
- Duvvasi Mohan
- Thagubothu Ramesh
- Baby Krithika
- Ambarushi
- Vamsi Aketi
- Jabardast Mohan

== Production ==
This film marks the return of Varun Sandhesh after a hiatus.

== Soundtrack ==
All music is composed by Shiva Kakani.

Track list
No.	Title	Lyrics	Artist(s)	Length
1.	"Vadi Vadiga"	Tirupathi Jaavana	Javed Ali, Malavika	4:13
2.	"Kallalloki Kallu Petti Chudu"	Bhaskarabhatla	S. P. Charan, Sahithi	3:18
3.	"Chilipi Chupulu"	Tirupathi Jaavana	Jaspreet Jasz, Divya Aishwarya	3:32
4.	"Na Kallaku Pattillevandi"	Asurayya, Giridhar Ragolu	Sahiti	3:10

== Reception ==
Sakshi Post praised the concept but criticized the narration. They further appreciated the performances of Varun and Farnaz. News18 Telugu praised Varun's performance but gave mixed review on the screenplay and other technical aspects.
