= High (TV series) =

2020 Hindi Web series

- Genre: Crime thriller, Drama
- Written by: Nishant Goyal and Emil Thomas
- Directed by: Nikhil Rao
- Starring: Akshay Oberoi; Ranvir Shorey; Shweta Basu Prasad; Mrinmayee Godbole; Madhur Mittal
- Theme music composer: Ninad Lad, Dipanjan Guha
- Country of origin: India
- Original language: Hindi
- No. of seasons: 1
- No. of episodes: 9

Production
- Production location: India
- Camera setup: Multi-camera
- Production company: Jamic Films

Original release
- Network: MX Player
- Release: 7 October 2020 – present

High is a 2020 Hindi-language crime, thriller drama web series directed by Nikhil Rao and released on MX Player. The series starring Akshay Oberoi, Mrinmayee Godbole and Ranvir Shorey as lead roles.

== Plot ==
Shiv Mathur is a good-hearted drug addict, approaches himself to a rehab center for treatment. The rehab is run by three doctors Shridhar Roy, Nakul and Shweta. The doctors developed something special in rehab, that once it hits the market, people won't be able to keep themselves away from it. The existence of the pill named 'Magic' creates a big disruption in the illegal drug market and manages to grab the attention of a professional assassin, Jackson Lakda and a news reporter Ashima Chauhan. The local gangsters Ghulam Bhai and Munna were involved to run their business of drugs. Eventually Shiv and the doctors make and execute their plan to spread the capsules of the new drug, because the drug is not harmful rather helpful for rehab. Pharmaceutical mafias and drug dealers start hunting them, who is behind the 'Magic'.

== Cast ==
- Akshay Oberoi as Shiv Mathur
- Ranvir Shorey as Jackson Lakda
- Mrinmayee Godbole as Ashima Chauhan
- Shweta Basu Prasad as Dr. Shweta
- Prakash Belawadi as Dr. Shridhar Roy
- Mantra as DJ
- Madhur Mittal as Jimmy
- Subrat Dutta as Dr. Roy
- Kunal Naik as Munna
- Nakul Bhalla as Dr. Nakul
