= Constable (film) =

2025 Indian Telugu film by Aryan Subhan SK

- Theatrical release poster
- Directed by: Aryan Subhan SK
- Written by: Aryan Subhan SK
- Produced by: Balagam Jagadish
- Starring: Varun Sandesh; Madhulika Varanasi
- Cinematography: Shaik Hazarathaiah
- Edited by: Sree Vara Prasad
- Music by: Score; Gyaani; Songs; Subhash Anand
- Production company: Jagruthi Movie Makers
- Release date: 10 October 2025
- Country: India
- Language: Telugu

Constable is a 2025 Indian Telugu-language crime thriller film written and directed by Aryan Subhan SK. The film stars Varun Sandesh and Madhulika Varanasi in lead roles.

The film was released on 10 October 2025.

== Cast ==
- Varun Sandesh as Kashi
- Madhulika Varanasi as Mahathi
- Surya as Kashi's brother-in-law
- Kalpa Latha as Kashi's sister
- Muralidhar Goud as Doctor
- Ravi Varma
- Nithya Sri as Keerthy
- Duvvasi Mohan
- Kashishh Rajput
- Bhel Prasad Rao

== Music ==
The background score is composed by Gyaani and songs were composed by Subhash Anand.

All music is composed by Subhash Anand.

Track listing
No.	Title	Lyrics	Singer(s)	Length
1.	"Megham Kurisindi"	Rama Rao Matumuru	Ramya Behara	4:08
2.	"Dawath"	Srinivas Teja	Geetha Madhuri	3:36
3.	"Maa Pancha Pranale"	Rama Rao Matumuru	Chandra Bose	4:33
4.	"Constable Anna"	Srinivas Teja	Nalgonda Gaddar Narsanna	4:15

== Release and reception ==
Constable was released on 10 October 2025.

Suhas Sistu of The Hans India rated it 3 out of 5 and stated, "Varun Sandesh shines in a career-defining role". Deccan Chronicle in its review wrote that, "Constable successfully creates a chilling atmosphere, leveraging its rural setting as a character in its own right".
