= Nindha =

- Directed by: Rajesh Jagannadham
- Written by: Rajesh Jagannadham
- Produced by: Rajesh Jagannadham
- Starring: Varun Sandesh; Tanikella Bharani; Chatrapathi Sekhar
- Cinematography: Ramiz Naveeth A
- Edited by: Anil Kumar Pasala
- Music by: Santhu Omkar
- Production company: The Fervent Indie Productions
- Release date: 21 June 2024
- Country: India
- Language: Telugu

Nindha (transl. Blame/Accusation) is a 2024 Indian Telugu-language thriller film written, directed and also produced by Rajesh Jagannadham under the production house The Fervent Indie Productions and this film features Varun Sandesh, Tanikella Bharani, Chatrapathi Sekhar. The film centers around a mysterious murder case happened in Kandrakota village, Andhra Pradesh.

== Cast ==
- Varun Sandesh as Vivek
- Tanikella Bharani as Satyanand
- Chatrapathi Sekhar as Balraju
- Surya as Chandrasekhar
- Annie as Sudha
- Shreya Rani Reddy as Jhanvi
- Bhadram as Lakshmipathi
- Sreeram Siddharth Krishna as Manohar
- Arun Dalai as Chanti
- Q Madhu as Manju
- Mime Madhu as Krishna Kanth
- Siddharth Gollapudi as S.I Prakash
- Rajkumar Kurra as Diwakar

== Production ==
Directed by Rajesh Jagannadham, and dialogues were written by, Sireesha Manikrishna, the film's cinematography was handled by Ramiz Naveeth, with editing by Anil Kumar P. The sound design was done by Sachin Sudhakaran, and the costumes were designed by Archana Rao. The film was produced by The Fervent Indie Productions, with music composed by Santhu Omkar. and the film was distributed by Mythri Movie Makers.

== Soundtrack ==
The music for Nindha features compositions by Santhu Omkar, Music mix by Siebert Philip accompanied by lyrics penned by Lyricist Kittu Vissapragada. Notable singers contributing to the soundtrack including Sree Rama Chandra, Sarath Santosh, and Pavithra. The film's sound engineering is helmed by Aravind Menon. And the audio rights were acquired by Divo Music, the first track of this Album was released on 24 May 2024

=== Track listing ===
No.	Title	Lyrics	Singer(s)	Length
1.	"Sankellu"	Kittu Vissupragada	Sreerama Chandra	4:06
2.	"Evare Evare"	Kittu Vissupragada	Sarath Santosh	3:58
3.	"Jaade"	Rajesh Jagannadham	Pavithra Narkinaballi	1:47
Total length:				10:02

== Release ==
Theatrical

Nindha was released worldwide in theatres on 21 June 2024. Nindha is the highest grosser in Varun Sandesh's Career for the past decade, it recovered most of its budget in first week as it was made on a very tight budget.

Home Media

The film digital distribution rights were acquired by ETV Win and premiered from 6 September 2024

== Reception ==
A critic from The New Indian Express wrote that "Overall, Nindha is engaging in bits and pieces, on a whodunnit scale. But the film fails to scratch beyond the surface of its genre template, despite its obvious potential"

Idlebrain Jeevi posted about OTT release that, The film, which was released in theaters and performed well at the box office, has been streaming on the popular OTT platform ETV Win since the 6th of this month. The film is receiving an overwhelming response on OTT as well. In just one day, the movie 'Nindha' garnered 1.4 million streaming minutes, making it the talk of the OTT world. Observers suggest that 'Nindha' is likely to accelerate its success even more on the platform.
