= Shweta Basu Prasad =

Indian actress (born 1991)

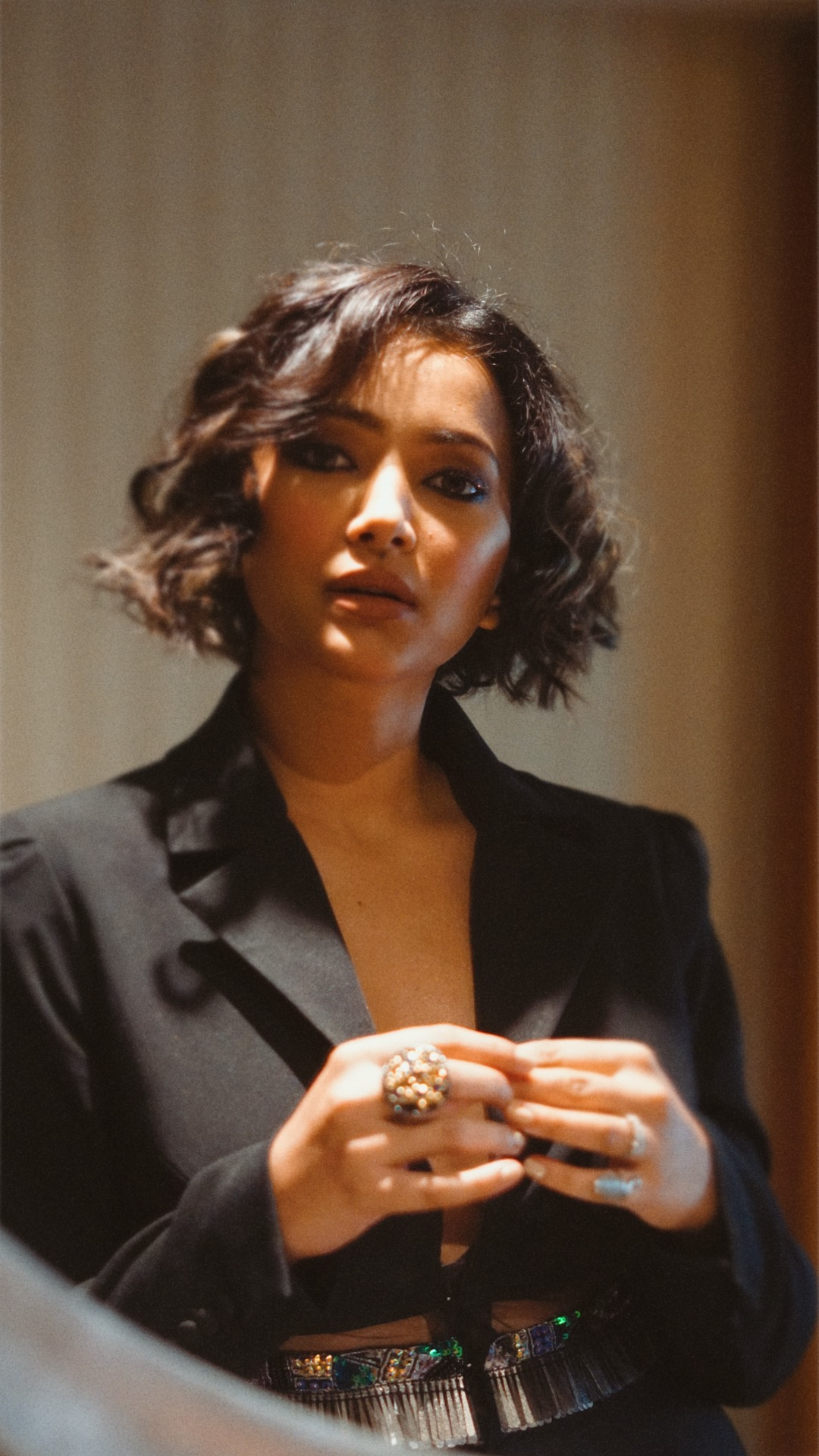
- Born: 11 January 1991 (age 35); Jamshedpur, Bihar, (present-day Jharkhand), India
- Occupations: Actress, film maker
- Years active: 2002 – present
- Spouse: Rohit Mittal (m. 2018; div. 2019)
- Awards: section on awards

Shweta Basu Prasad (born 11 January 1991) is an Indian actress known for her works in television, Hindi cinema, Telugu cinema and Tamil cinema. She won the National Film Award for Best Child Artist for her role in Makdee (2002). After Iqbal (2005), she transitioned to adult roles and found success with Kotha Bangaru Lokam (2008), The Tashkent Files (2019), and OTT platform films and web series such as Serious Men (2020), Criminal Justice (Season 3, 2022), India Lockdown (2022), Jubilee (2023) and Tribhuvan Mishra: CA Topper (2024).

Shweta has also worked in Bengali language films. She made a documentary on Indian classical music, and has produced and written for short films. She made her directoral debut with the short film Retake in 2023.

== Education and early career ==
Shweta Prasad was born on 11 January 1991 in Jamshedpur, in Bihar (now in Jharkhand). She migrated to Mumbai with her family while still a child. Basu is her mother's maiden name and Prasad is her father's surname. In her earlier films she was credited as Shweta Prasad; later, she added her mother's maiden name to her screen name.

Shweta studied commerce at the R. N. Podar High School, Santacruz, Mumbai, and completed her graduation in mass media and journalism. She has written columns for The Indian Express.

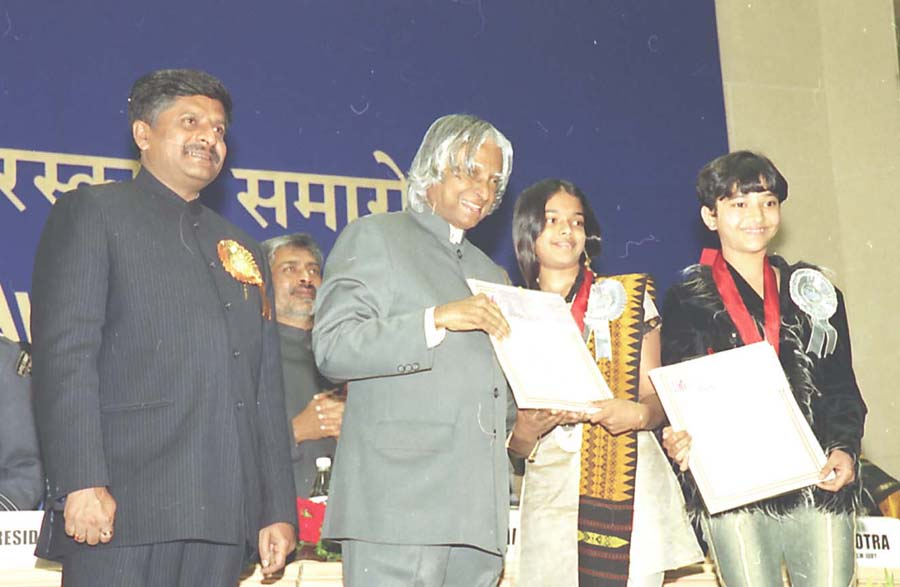
President Dr. A.P.J. Abdul Kalam presenting the Best Child Artist Award for the year 2002 to Shweta Prasad (right) for her role in Makdee at the 50th National Film Awards

Shweta made her film debut in 2002 with a double role in Makdee for which she got the National Award for Best Child Actress. She then got offers from television series Kahaani Ghar Ghar Kii and Karishma Kaa Karishma. In 2005, director Nagesh Kukunoor offered her the film Iqbal, and she became a household name with the role of “Khadija” in the film. She won the Best Supporting Actress Award at the 5th Karachi International Film Festival for Iqbal.

She took a break after Iqbal and continued her studies. She is a graduate in Journalism and Mass Media, and after her studies, she made a documentary Roots, on Indian classical music featuring the legends of the music industry. Shweta spent four years between 2012 and 2016 researching and making this documentary film, which features personalities like Shubha Mudgal, A R Rahman, Pandit Shiv Kumar Sharma, Pandit Hari Prasad Chaurasia, Pandit Jasraj, Pandit Birju Maharaj, Vishal Bhardwaj, Amit Trivedi and Ustad Amjad Ali Khan. The film also has a ten-minute animation bit showing a 5000-year history of Indian music. Shweta, who is herself trained in playing the Sitar, is a classical music enthusiast and made this project from her own pocket out of passion. During the time, she worked as a script consultant at Phantom Films for an year.

== Television and later film career ==
Shweta made her debut in Telugu cinema in 2008, with the film Kotha Bangaru Lokam. She has also done movies in Tamil and Bengali.

She played the leading role of Nandini, wife of Chandragupta Maurya, in the television series Chandra Nandni (2016–2017). She said that this marked her comeback to television.

Her next Hindi film outing was Badrinath Ki Dulhania (2017) by Dharma Productions.

Shweta played a rookie journalist and central protagonist in The Tashkent Files (2019), a suspense drama thriller based on the death of India's second Prime Minister Lal Bahadur Shastri. She received critical praise and acclaim from critics and audiences alike. The film was received well commercially and was hailed as a surprise box office success of 2019, after successfully making a 50-day Box Office run.

Shweta has worked on OTT films and series, Serious Men, Comedy Couple, and High in 2020, Ray (2021), Jamun (2021), Criminal Justice: Adhura Sach (season 3, 2022), and Jubilee (2023).

Shweta has acted in short films Interior Café: Night, which she also produced, Visa, Chubhan, and The Lovers. She made her directorial debut with the short film Retake, that she wrote as well. The film has Anupam Kher in the lead, and made its American premiere in the short films category at the New York Indian Film Festival (NYIFF) in May 2023.

== Filmography ==
=== Films ===
Year	Film	Role	Language	Notes
2002	Makdee	Chunni / Munni	Hindi	
2005	Iqbal	Khadija	Hindi	
2005	Vaah! Life Ho Toh Aisi!	Shweta	Hindi	
2006	Darna Zaroori Hai	Ashu	Hindi	
2008	Ek Nadir Galpo	Anu	Bengali	Bengali debut
2008	Kotha Bangaru Lokam	Swapna	Telugu	Telugu debut
2009	Ride	Rani	Telugu	
2009	Kasko	RJ Krishnaveni	Telugu	
2010	Kalavar King	Shruti	Telugu	
2011	Raa Raa	Gayathri	Tamil	Tamil debut
2011	Priyudu		Telugu	
2011	Genius		Telugu	Item song "Dibiri Dibiri"
2012	Mai		Tamil	
2013	Chandhamama	Mary	Tamil	
2014	Interior Café: Night	Young girl	Hindi	Short film
2017	Badrinath Ki Dulhania	Urmila Shukla Bansal	Hindi	
2017	Mixture Potlam	Suvarna Sundari	Telugu	
2017	Visa	Tejaswini	Hindi / English	Short film
2018	Mard Ko Dard Nahi Hota	Surya's mother	Hindi	
2018	Vijetha		Telugu	
2018	Megalopolis	Svetlana	Hindi	
2019	The Tashkent Files	Raagini Phule	Hindi	
2019	Chubhan	Meghna	Hindi	Short film
2020	Shukranu	Reema	Hindi	ZEE5 film
2020	The Lovers	Nitya	Hindi	Short film
2020	Serious Men	Anuja Dhavre	Hindi	Netflix film
2020	Comedy Couple	Zoya Batra	Hindi	ZEE5 film
2021	Jamun	Chetna	Hindi	Eros Now release
2022	India Lockdown	Mehrunissa	Hindi	ZEE5 film
2024	U=Me	Nikita	Hindi	Short film
2026	Naa Wife Missing	Swapna	Telugu	Released on Aha

=== Short film ===
Year	Work	Role	Network	Notes
2022	Yatri Kripya Dhyaan Dein	Main lead	Amazon MX Player	short film

=== Television ===
Year	Work	Role	Network	Notes
1998	X Zone	Young Anu	Zee TV	Episode 94
2000–2008	Kahaani Ghar Ghar Kii	Young Shruti Aggarwal	Star Plus	2 episodes
2001–2003	Kutumb	Vanshita	Sony TV	250 episodes
2002	Koshish - Ek Aashaa	Kajal's Daughter, 2002)	Zee TV	1 episode
2003–2004	Karishma Kaa Karishma	Sweety	Star Plus	65 episodes
2003	The Magic Make-Up Box	Maya	Zee TV	33 episodes
2015–2016	Darr Sabko Lagta Hai	Pangkhuri	&TV	1 episode
2016–2017	Chandra Nandini	Nandini Maurya	Star Plus	Main role
2018	Gangstars	Aishwarya	Amazon Video	Telugu series
2019	Flip		Eros Now	Mini series
2019–2020	Hostages	Shikha Pandey	Disney+ Hotstar	Main role, season 2
2020	Dr Donn		ALTBalaji	
2020–present	High	Dr. Shweta	MX Player	
2021	Ray	Maggie	Netflix	Episode: "Forget Me Not"
2022	Criminal Justice: Adhura Sach	Lekha Agastya	Disney+Hotstar	
2023	Jubilee	Ratna Das	Amazon Prime Video	
2024	Tribhuvan Mishra: CA Topper	Shobha Pathak	Netflix	
2024	Zindaginama	Namrata	SonyLIV	Episode: "Bhanwar"
2025	Oops Ab Kya?	Roohi Jani	JioHotstar	Main role
2025	Criminal Justice: A Family Matter	Lekha Agastya	JioHotstar	
2025	Maharani Season 4	Roshni Bharti	SonyLIV	

== Personal life ==
In September 2014, Shweta was arrested from a hotel in Hyderabad after a police raid. She was detained by the police on charges of prostitution, and sent to a rescue home, where she was held for two months. In December 2014, the Metropolitan Sessions Court, Nampally, Hyderabad, withdrew all charges against her. After her release, she issued an open letter to the media clarifying as false and misleading, a statement attributed to her by a journalist at the time of the arrest. In the letter, she said during the time of the arrest, she was attending the Santosham Film Awards event and staying at the hotel arranged by the organizers.

She married filmmaker Rohit Mittal on 13 December 2018. She announced their separation on Instagram on 10 December 2019.

== Awards ==
Year	Film	Award	Category	Result	Ref
2003	Makdee	50th National Film Awards	Best Child Artist	Won	
2006	Iqbal	Zee Cine Awards	Best Actress (Critics)	Won	
2006	Iqbal	Screen Awards	Best Supporting Actress	Won	
2006	Iqbal	51st Filmfare Awards	Best Supporting Actress	Nominated	
2007	Iqbal	5th Karachi International Film Festival	Best Supporting Actress	Won	
2009	Kotha Bangaru Lokam	56th Filmfare Awards South	Best Actress – Telugu	Nominated	
2009	Kotha Bangaru Lokam	Santosham Film Awards	Best Actress	Nominated	
