= Bhaiyya Bhaiyya =

- Film Poster
- Directed by: Johny Antony
- Written by: Benny P. Nayarambalam
- Produced by: Laisamma Pottoore
- Starring: Kunchacko Boban; Biju Menon; Nisha Agarwal
- Cinematography: Vinod Illampilly
- Edited by: Ranjan Abraham
- Music by: Vidyasagar
- Production company: Howly Pottoore
- Distributed by: Nobel Andre Release & Tricolor Entertainments.
- Release date: 5 September 2014
- Running time: 129 minutes
- Country: India
- Language: Malayalam

Bhaiyya Bhaiyya (Theatrical name: Bhayya Bhayya) is a 2014 Malayalam comedy film directed by Johny Antony and scripted by Benny P. Nayarambalam starring Kunchacko Boban and Biju Menon in lead roles. The film also features Nisha Agarwal (in her debut Malayalam film), Vinutha Lal, Innocent, Suraj Venjarammood, Salim Kumar and Vijayaraghavan in other important roles. It features music by Vidyasagar and cinematography by Vinod Illampally and was largely shot at Erayil Kadavu Kottayam, Tamil Nadu and Kolkata. Produced by Laisamma Pottoore under Nobel Andre Production.

Bhaiyya Bhaiyya released on 5 September 2014. The film received mixed to positive reviews from critics and became an "average hit" at the box office.

== Plot ==
The film begins with the mischievous childhood of Babumon and Baburam Chatterji. Then it progresses to their mischievous adulthood. They run into some troubles with Monayi and Varki, who are the brother and father of Angel, Babu's love interest, and their right hand Manikandan. When a Bengali worker falls prey to a trap laid by Manikandan to kill Babu, it turns out to be a life changer. While taking the body back to Kolkata, Babu and Angel elope in the ambulance to register their marriage there. Chaterji takes up the driving, and Shanthi who is Babulal's love interest is also there and Soman to see Bengal. The troubles they land in and how they resolve it to successfully lead a married life forms the rest of the film.

== Cast ==
- Kunchacko Boban as Kochuveetil Babumon
- Biju Menon as Babulal Chatterji / Bengali Babu
- Nisha Agarwal as Angel
- Vinutha Lal as Shanthi
- Innocent as Kochuveettil Chacko
- Suraj Venjarammood as Soman
- Vijayaraghavan as Vettupparambil Varkey
- Shammi Thilakan as Vettupparambil Monayi
- Salim Kumar as Korah
- Sudheer as Manikandan
- Sadiq as S.I. Karim Abdullah
- Jacob Gregory as Azeez, thief
- Jayasankar Karimuttam as Akash, thief
- Ambika Mohan as Chacko's wife & Babumon's mother
- Thesni Khan as Vasanthi, Monayi's wife
- Seema G. Nair as Karim Abdullah's wife
- Jaise Jose as Ramalingam
- Makarand Deshpande as Maoist leader
- Krishna Shankar as Jayakrishnan Namboothiri
- Divya Prabha as Anna, Korah's daughter

== Critical reception ==
The Times of India gave the film 3 stars out of 5 and wrote, "all in all, the story falls into place at the end, despite the initial glitches". Sify wrote, "The makers of Bhaiyya Bhaiyya have just mixed melodrama, crass comedy, song n dance routines and some action sequences, without a proper recipe. Just like what happens in cooking, they end up making a tasteless dish". Rediff gave the film 2 stars out of 5 and wrote, "Bhaiyya Bhaiyya does provide a few chuckles, but nothing substantial". Nowrunning.com gave it a score of 1.8 out of 5 and wrote, "Sporadically bringing out a laughter or two, this is a film that very rarely engages us emotionally and which fundamentally falls apart at the seams". Indiaglitz.com gave it 6 out of 10 and wrote, "Evenly paced and filled with comedies, this light hearted film entertains in parts. Had it been directed with a little more care, ‘Bhaiya Bhaya’ could have worked relatively well".

== Soundtrack ==
Bhaiyya Bhaiyya

Soundtrack album by Vidyasagar
- Released: 30 August 2014
- Recorded: Varsha Vallaki Studios
- Genre: Feature Film Soundtrack
- Length: 18:55
- Language: Malayalam
- Label: Satyam Audios
- Producer: Vidyasagar

Vidyasagar chronology
Oru Indian Pranayakadha (2013)	Bhaiyya Bhaiyya (2014)	Mariyam Mukku (2015)

All music is composed by Vidyasagar.

No.	Title	Lyrics	Artist(s)	Length
1.	"Aarodum"	Murukan Kattakada	P. Jayachandran
2.	"Bhayyaa Bhayyaa"	Santhosh Varma	Santhosh Varma
3.	"Ishqwaalaa"	Rituraj Sen	Vidyasagar
4.	"Nenchilaaraa"	Vayalar Sarathchandra Varma, Rituraj Sen	Najim Arshad
5.	"Veyil Poyaal"	Santhosh Varma	Yazin Nizar, Madhu Balakrishnan
