= Music Magic =

- Movie poster
- Directed by: Manthrakshar DS
- Written by: Manthrakshar DS
- Produced by: Paleem Srikanth Reddy
- Starring: Rahul; Kimaya Bhattacharya; Trinath; Henna Chopra
- Music by: Joseph Sunder; Padmanadham
- Production companies: Palred Media & Entertainment Pvt. LTD.
- Release date: 20 September 2013
- Country: India
- Language: Telugu

Music Magic is a 2013 Indian Telugu-language musical drama film written and directed by Manthrakshar DS and starring Syed Sohel (credited as Rahul) and Kimaya. It was released on 20 September 2013 to mixed-to-negative reviews.

== Cast ==
- Rahul as Sanjay
- Kimaya Bhattacharya as Pallavi
- Trinath
- Henna Chopra
- M. S. Narayana
- Thagubothu Ramesh
- Dhanraj
- L. B. Sriram
- Madhumani

== Soundtrack ==
The film's music composed by Joseph Sunder and Padmanadham. The film has 13 songs.

No.	Title	Lyrics	Singer(s)	Length
1.	"Adi Mamam"	Ch. Vijay Kumar	Bharagavi Pillai Raghuram	1:51
2.	"Belly (Instrumental)"	Joseph Sunder	Joseph Sunder	2:24
3.	"Freedom"	Ch. Vijay Kumar	Allen Ganta	3:48
4.	"If You Wanna Be A Winner"	Ch. Vijay Kumar	Sam Alex	3:01
5.	"Kothale Koyokandira"	Saadhu	Revanth & Geetha Madhuri	4:02
6.	"Loosers"	Joseph Sunder	Kenny	2:36
7.	"Nataraaja"	Ch. Vijay Kumar	Sunitha	3:40
8.	"Ne Subrabatham"	T Ram Mohan Rao	Sunitha	3:48
9.	"R U Ready"	Saadhu	Aravind	3:21
10.	"Hip Hop"	Ch. Vijay Kumar	Vamshi	2:22
11.	"Silence"	Saadhu	Bonnie Chakraborthy	5:54
12.	"Vaani Veena"	Ch. Vijay Kumar	Pranavi	3:56
13.	"Vandanamide"	Ch. Vijay Kumar	Sunitha	3:40
Total length:				44 min 16 sec

== Reception ==
The film was reviewed in Full Hyderabad by Kritika Deval, who criticised the script and the acting, commenting that the film "looks and feels exactly like something a media student would make while aiming for the bare minimum of marks". It was also reviewed in Times of India, whose reviewer gave it an overall score of 2.5 out of 5.
