= Priyudu =

- Official poster
- Directed by: Shravan
- Written by: Shravan
- Produced by: Uday Kiran
- Starring: Varun Sandesh; Preetika Rao
- Cinematography: Malhar Bhatt
- Edited by: Marthand K. Venkatesh
- Music by: Mohan Jona
- Release date: 3 December 2011
- Country: India
- Language: Telugu

Priyudu (transl. Lover) is a 2011 Indian Telugu-language romantic drama film directed by Shravan and starring Varun Sandesh and Preetika Rao.

== Cast ==
- Varun Sandesh as Karthik
- Preetika Rao as Madhu Latha
- Ranadhir Reddy as Vara Prasad
- Kota Srinivasa Rao
- Thagubothu Ramesh
- Vennela Kishore
- Nassar as Karthik's father
- Vijay Sai
- Ali as Kuphli Baba, Hukka Baba and Pungi Baba
- Pragathi
- Surekha Vani
- Y. Kasi Viswanath as Madhu Latha's father
- Shweta Basu Prasad (cameo appearance)

== Production ==
Varun Sandhesh plays the role of a businessman's son. Amrita Rao's sister, Preetika, is the heroine. Danayya named the film. The film was shot in Hyderabad and a couple songs were shot in Bangkok. Preetika took lessons in Mumbai to learn Telugu.

== Soundtrack ==
Music by Mohan Jona.

Track listing
No.	Title	Singer(s)	Length
1.	"Love Lo Edo"	Benny Dayal	3:50
2.	"Chaitrama"	Karthik	5:20
3.	"Albela Albela"	Vijay Prakash, Chinmayi	4:20
4.	"Bakkodera"	Priya Himesh	3:16
5.	"Cheliya Cheliya"	Shankar Mahadevan	5:17
6.	"Chinni Gunde"	Shweta Mohan	3:16
Total length:			25:19

== Reception ==
Jeevi of Idlebrain.com wrote that "Priyudu is a better film for Varun Sandesh after Kotha Bangaru Lokam". A critic from The Hindu wrote that "The story gives out an outdated approach to narration and also the characters". A critic from The Times of India wrote that "It just looks like a mish mash of many similar films of the past". 123 Telugu wrote that "Priyudu is a film that has not much going for it except for some instances of humour in the first half". A critic from Full Hyderabad opined that "The movie is a plain commonplace romance, nothing more than an over-dramatization of the kind of unremarkable situations that college youth get into".
