= Alanaati Ramchandrudu =

Indian film

- Theatrical release poster
- Directed by: Chilukuri Akash Reddy
- Written by: Chilukuri Akash Reddy
- Produced by: Hymavathi Jadapolu; Sreeram Jadapolu
- Starring: Krishna Vamsi; Mokksha; Brahmaji; Sudha; Sivannarayana Naripeddi; Vasu Inturi
- Cinematography: Prem Sagar
- Edited by: JC Srikar
- Music by: Sashank Tirupati
- Production company: Hyniva Creations LLP
- Release date: 2 August 2024
- Running time: 156 minutes
- Country: India
- Language: Telugu

Alanaati Ramchandrudu is a 2024 Indian Telugu-language film written and directed by Chilukuri Akash Reddy. It is produced by Hymavathi Jadapolu, Sreeram Jadapolu under the banner of Hyniva Creations LLP. the film features Krishna Vamsi, Mokksha, Brahmaji, Sudha, Sivannarayana Naripeddi, Vasu Inturi in important roles alongside other ensemble cast.

The film was released on 2 August 2024.

== Plot ==
Siddhu (Krishna Vamsi) is a shy and introverted college student who struggles with public speaking and social interactions. In contrast, Dharani (Mokksha) is outgoing and effortlessly draws people to her. Despite their contrasting personalities, Siddhu is captivated by Dharani's vibrant nature and harbors deep feelings for her. Unable to express his love directly, he records his experiences and memories of her on tapes, keeping them as a private collection. Although they form a friendship, Siddhu's fear prevents him from confessing his love. However, when he finally gathers the courage to reveal his feelings, their lives take an unexpected turn, leading to unforeseen consequences.

== Cast ==
- Krishna Vamsi as Siddu
- Mokksha as Dharani
- Supraj Ranga as Vikram, Dharani's ex-boyfriend
- Brahmaji as Major Subhash Reddy, Dharani's father
- Sudha as Savithri, Siddu's neighbor
- Sivannarayana Naripeddi as Police SI
- Vasu Inturi as Photographer
- Venkatesh Kakamanu as Srisailam, College Senior
- Chaitanya Garikapati as Abhi, Siddu's bestfriend
- Snehamadhuri Sharma as Sneha, Siddu and Abhi's friend
- Pramodini Pammi as Siddu's mother
- Keshav Deepak as Siddu's father
- Divya Sri Gurugubelli as Divya, Dharani's bestfriend

== Music ==
The music and background score is composed by Sashank Tirupathi.

Sound Track
No.	Title	Lyrics	Singer(s)	Length
1.	"Brahmhaandamantha"	Rakendu Mouli	Javed Ali	4:40
2.	"Naa Peru Nuvvani"	Chandrabose	Rithu Vysakh, Dinker Kalvala	3:14
3.	"Kanulara"	Shreshta	Anjana Balakrishnan	3:48
4.	"Mass Flash Mob"	Mallika Vallabha Pitla	Harini, Nadapriya, Lakshmi Meghana	2:35
5.	"Nanna"	Chilukuri Akash Reddy	Anjana Balakrishnan, Sragvi	3:00
6.	"Seethamma"	Bharadwaj Gaali, Zeeha Khan (Qawwali Lyrics)	Kapil Kapilan, Pranathi, Shahbaz Khan	4:55
Total length:				22:12

== Release ==
=== Theatrical ===
Alanaati Ramchandrudu was released worldwide on 2 August 2024 in Telugu language.

== Reception ==
The film received generally favorable reviews, particularly praising the background score, songs, production values and realistic performances of the cast.

Sakshi gave a 2.5 rating, particularly praising the performances of the lead actors and the beautiful music composed by Sashank Tirupathi.
