= Nisha Agarwal =

Indian actress (born 1989)

Nisha Aggarwal
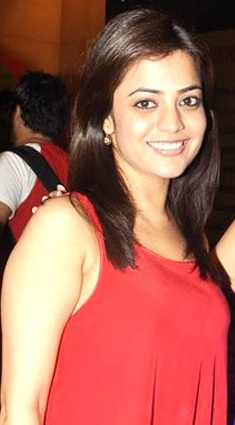
- Aggarwal at Lakme Fashion Week in 2012
- Born: 18 October 1989 (age 36); Mumbai, Maharashtra
- Occupations: Model; actress
- Years active: 2010–2014
- Spouse: Karan Valecha (m. 2013)
- Children: 1
- Relatives: Kajal Aggarwal (sister)

Nisha Aggarwal is a former Indian actress and a model who appeared in Telugu, Malayalam and Tamil films. She is the younger sister of actress Kajal Aggarwal.

== Early life ==
Aggarwal was born and brought up in a Punjabi Hindu family settled in Mumbai. Her father Vinay Aggarwal, is an entrepreneur in the textile business and her mother Suman Aggarwal is a confectioner, and her sister's business manager. She has an elder sister Kajal Aggarwal, an actress in Telugu, Tamil and Hindi cinema.

== Personal life ==
Aggarwal married a Mumbai-based businessman Karan Valecha, who is the owner of Gold's gym chain on 28 December 2013. On 27 October 2017, she gave birth to their son, Ishaan Valecha.

== Career ==
In late 2010, Kajal Aggarwal announced that Nisha would make her acting debut in Telugu films. Nisha had been travelling with her elder sister to the shooting sets and soon got noticed. Her first Telugu film, she said, happened after the director saw stills of her in a magazine. Her first film was the romantic drama, Yemaindi Ee Vela, which was a box office success. Her performance was praised by critics. Her next film was Solo, which released in late 2011 and featured her as a medical college student, with a reviewer from Rediff stating that she "proves her acting talents in the second half, especially the climax".

Her Tamil film debut, Ishtam (2012), was a remake of Yemaindi Ee Vela, which was a box office failure. She appeared as a "chatpata village girl" in 2013 opposite Aadi and Bhavna Ruparel in Sukumarudu. Later that year she starred in a film titled Saradaga Ammayitho that saw her pairing with her Yemaindi Ee Vela co-star Varun Sandesh again. In 2014, she entered the Malayalam film industry with Bhaiyya Bhaiyya, playing Angel, an "educated and headstrong girl", who is the daughter of an ex-minister. She then appeared in Cousins (2014), another Malayalam film.

== Filmography ==
Year	Film	Role	Language
2010	Yemaindi Ee Vela	Avantika	Telugu
2011	Solo	Vaishnavi	Telugu
2012	Ishtam	Sandhya	Tamil
2013	Sukumarudu	Sankari	Telugu
2013	Saradaga Ammayitho	Geetha / Dr. Anjali	Telugu
2014	Bhaiyya Bhaiyya	Angel	Malayalam
2014	Cousins	Mallika / Malli	Malayalam
