= Bootcut Balaraju =

2024 Indian romantic comedy film by Sree Koneti

- Theatrical release poster
- Directed by: Sree Koneti
- Written by: Sree Koneti
- Story by: Lucky Media Unit
- Produced by: Md. Pasha
- Starring: Syed Sohel; Meghalekha; Sunil; Indraja; Vennela Kishore; Brahmaji
- Cinematography: Shyam K. Naidu
- Edited by: Vijay Vardhan Kavuri
- Music by: Bheems Ceciroleo
- Production companies: Katha Veruntadhi Productions; Global films
- Release date: 2 February 2024
- Running time: 144 mins
- Country: India
- Language: Telugu

Bootcut Balaraju is a 2024 Indian Telugu-lanaguage romantic comedy film written and directed by Sree Koneti. The film was produced by Md. Pasha under the banner of Katha Verunthadi Productions and Global films. The film stars Syed Sohel as the titular character alongside Meghalekha, Sunil, Indraja in lead roles, Syed Sohel also debut in as a producer with film.

== Cast ==
- Syed Sohel as "Bootcut" Balaraju
- Meghalekha as Mahalakshmi "Maha"
- Sunil as PK
- Indraja as Indravati Patel
- Vennela Kishore
- Brahmaji
- Mukku Avinash as Mukesh
- Jabardast Rohini as Rohini
- Siri Hanumanth as Sirisilla siri
- Suman as Narayana Patel
- Jabardasth Saddam as Shankari
- Vaddila Vanaja

== Production ==
The film was announced through a formal muhurta pooja ceremony on 21 December 2021, in Hyderabad. Principal photography was scheduled to complete in February 2022.

On 18 April 2022, a first-look glimpse of the film was released. With filming wrapped up, the focus of the production team shifted to the release of its songs.

The teaser for Bootcut Balaraju was unveiled by Anil Ravipudi on 11 December 2023.

== Soundtrack ==
The soundtrack album and background score were composed by Bheems Ceciroleo and Sony Music India acquired the audio rights.

track listing
No.	Title	Lyrics	Singer(s)	Length
1.	"Raju Naa Balaraju"	Kasarla Shyam	Swathi Reddy UK	3:59
2.	"Thagudhaam Thaaggi Ugudhaam"	Afroz Ali	Rahul Sipligunj, Sai Madhav	2:51
3.	"Ringu Ringu Billa"	Dev Pawar	Bhole Shavali, Raghuram	2:44
4.	"Malli Malli"	Kasarla Shyam	Aditi Bhavaraju, Ritesh G Rao	4:12
5.	"Chinni Chinni"	Ranjith Kumar Ricky	Anudeep Dev, Sai Veda Vagdevi	1:45
Total length:				14:11

== Release ==
Bootcut Balaraju was theatrically released on 2 February 2024.

== Reception ==
Bhavana Sharma of Deccan Chronicle gave the film 2.5/5 stars and stated that "Bootcut Balaraju presents a love story with moments of brilliance. Sohel's performance and the humor elevate the film. However, occasional narration lags and uninspiring sequences may impact some viewers. Despite these aspects, it carves a niche as a love story with moments of endearment."

Raisa Nasreen of Times Now gave the film 3/5 stars and stated that "Sohel brings a carefree charm to his role as a rural, academically disinterested youth facing ridicule. The film promises a mix of laughter and fun moments as it explores the highs and lows of his family and love life."
