= Mr. Pregnant =

2023 Indian film

- Directed by: Srinivas Vinjanampati
- Produced by: Appi Reddy; Ravireddy Sajjala; Venkat Annapareddy
- Starring: Syed Sohel; Roopa Koduvayur
- Cinematography: Nizar Shafi
- Edited by: Prawin Pudi
- Music by: Shravan Bharadwaj
- Production company: Mic Movies
- Release date: 18 August 2023
- Running time: 2 hours 15 minutes
- Country: India
- Language: Telugu
- Box office: est. ₹4.6 crore (4 days)

Mr. Pregnant is a 2023 Indian Telugu-language romantic comedy film directed by Srinivas Vinjanampati, starring Syed Sohel and Roopa Koduvayur. The film received mixed reviews from critics.

== Story ==
Gautam is a famous tattoo artist. Mahi, a simple and loving girl, falls deeply in love with him. Mahi dreams of a happy married life with children, but Gautam doesn’t feel the same way at first. After several efforts from Mahi, Gautam, in a drunken state, finally agrees to be with her — but makes it clear that he does not want children.

Heartbroken, Mahi decides to go to the hospital for surgery to prevent pregnancy. But as Gautam learns more about her kindness and love, he realizes his feelings for her. They get married and begin their life together.

One day, a pregnant woman tragically dies in Gautam’s arms. This brings back painful memories from his past — Gautam had lost his mother when she was about to give birth to his younger sibling. Around the same time, Mahi finds out she’s pregnant. While Mahi is overjoyed, Gautam’s deep fear and trauma make him feel completely unready to become a father.

Struggling with his emotions, Gautam comes up with a shocking idea — he decides to carry their baby himself. Most hospitals reject the idea, calling it impossible. Finally, one doctor agrees to perform the surgery, transplanting Mahi’s uterus into Gautam’s body.

Gautam becomes pregnant. As his belly grows, a video of his ultrasound scan goes viral. The public mocks and insults both Gautam and Mahi. The constant judgment from society creates tension between the couple, putting their relationship to the test.

Despite all the struggles, Gautam bravely continues his journey.

In the end, Gautam safely gives birth to a healthy baby girl. He proves that love and determination can break even the strongest boundaries set by society. The film ends with Gautam and Mahi happily holding their baby, proud of their incredible journey, and excited about their beautiful future as a family.

== Cast ==
- Syed Sohel as Gautham
- Roopa Koduvayur as Mahi
- Suhasini Maniratnam as Doctor
- Raja Ravindra
- Brahmaji
- Ali
- Harsha Chemudu
- Abhishek Reddy Bobbala
- Swapnika

== Production ==
The makers of the film initially approached Nani and Vishwak Sen to play the lead role. The film is based on the director's wife's pregnancy when she had a premature baby.

== Reception ==
The film received mixed reviews from critics.

Professional ratings
Review scores
Source	Rating
The Times of India	2.5/5 stars
Cinema Express	2/5 stars
Sakshi Post	2.5/5 stars

A critic from The Times of India wrote that "Mr Pregnant stands as an experimental film that fearlessly delves into a unique concept. Syed Sohel's performance shines as a highlight, accompanied by poignant emotional moments and instances of humour". A critic from Cinema Express wrote that "The novelty of the story keeps the proceedings worth looking out for. But when you see Sohel beating up men at two different places in the film, despite being fully pregnant, you know quite clearly the kind of film you are in for". A critic from Sakshi Post wrote that "Watch it only for the new idea and Sohel's performance".
