= Organic Mama Hybrid Alludu =

- Film poster
- Directed by: S. V. Krishna Reddy
- Written by: S. V. Krishna Reddy
- Produced by: Koneru Kalpana
- Starring: Rajendra Prasad; Meena; Syed Sohel; Mrinalini Ravi
- Cinematography: C. Ramprasad
- Edited by: Prawin Pudi
- Music by: Songs: S. V. Krishna Reddy; Score: S. Chinna
- Production companies: Ammu Creations; Kalpana Chitra
- Release date: 3 March 2023
- Country: India
- Language: Telugu

Organic Mama Hybrid Alludu (transl. Organic father-in-law, hybrid son-in-law) is a 2023 Indian Telugu-language romantic drama film, produced by Koneru Kalpana on Ammu Creations banner, presented by K. Atchi Reddy and directed by S. V. Krishna Reddy. It stars Rajendra Prasad, Meena, Syed Sohel and Mrinalini Ravi in the pivotal roles. The film was released to mixed-to-negative reviews.

== Cast ==
- Rajendra Prasad as Venkatramana
- Meena as Shakuntala
- Syed Sohel as Vijay
- Mrinalini Ravi as Haasini
- Sunil as Producer Munikonda
- Ajay Ghosh as Gajula Gangarao
- Ali as Reporter
- Prudhvi Raj as Haasini's prospective groom's father
- Surya as Venkat Rao, Vijay's father
- Raja Ravindra as Mr. Ramesh
- Krishna Bhagavaan as Haasini's prospective groom's father
- Saptagiri as Haasini's prospective groom
- Praveen as Simham
- Harsha Chemudu as Raghu
- Babu Mohan as Mohan
- Rocket Raghava as Munikonda's assistant
- Shanmukh (Pandu) as Haasini's prospective groom
- Kotesh Manava as Dr. Dhanraj Chakravarthy
- Hema as Sitamma, Vijay's mother
- Surekha Vani as Haasini's prospective groom's mother
- Sana as Haasini's prospective groom's mother
- Venkat as himself (cameo appearance)
- Varun Sandesh as Actor in Vijay's film (cameo appearance)
- Rashmi Gautam as Actress in Vijay's film (cameo appearance)

== Soundtrack ==
Organic Mama Hybrid Alludu

Film score by S. V. Krishna Reddy
- Released: 2023
- Genre: Soundtrack
- Length: 17:52
- Label: Saregama Audio
- Producer: S. V. Krishna Reddy

S. V. Krishna Reddy chronology
Yamaleela 2 (2014)	Organic Mama Hybrid Alludu (2023)

Music composed by S. V. Krishna Reddy. Music released on Saregama Telugu Audio.

No.	Title	Lyrics	Singer(s)	Length
1.	"Allasani"	Sri Mani	Sri Krishna, Harini	4:57
2.	"Vaisakha Maasam"	Sri Mani	Sreerama Chandra, Sahithi Chaganti	3:48
3.	"Kotha Rakam"	Chandrabose	Rahul Sipligunj, Shanmukha Priya	4:45
4.	"Nammukora"	Ramajogayya Sastry	L. V. Revanth	4:06
Total length:				17:52

== Reception ==
A critic from Cinema Express wrote that "The SV Krishna Reddy directorial borrows heavily from the past, leaving them devoid of effective drama". A critic from The Times of India wrote that "This family entertainer works in parts but disappoints as a package because of its archaic storytelling and banal humor in the second half".
