= Ee Varsham Sakshiga =

- concept poster
- Directed by: Ramana Mogili
- Screenplay by: Rajendra Bharadwaj
- Produced by: B. Obul Subba Reddy
- Starring: Varun Sandesh; Hariprriya
- Cinematography: Mohan Chand
- Edited by: Nandamuri Hari
- Music by: Anil Gopi Reddy
- Release date: 13 December 2014
- Running time: 127 minutes
- Country: India
- Language: Telugu

Ee Varsham Sakshiga (The rain as a witness) is a 2014 Telugu romantic comedy film directed by Ramana Mogili. Rajendra Bharadwaj provided the screenplay and Nandamuri Hari did the editing for the film. The film was released worldwide on 13 December 2014. However this film became a box-office bomb. The title is based on the lyric from "Mellagaa" from Varsham (2004).

== Plot ==
Jai (Varun Sandesh) meets a girl named Sitamahalakshmi 'Maha' (Hariprriya) in a train and falls in love with her during the course of the journey. He accidentally attends a ceremony, which turns out to be Maha's engagement, and is left heartbroken. But to his surprise, Maha elopes with the groom, whom she was engaged to, along with Jai. They went to Hyderabad after knowing that the groom had loved a Muslim girl. Jai and his friends successfully eloped with her, and then a fight ensued with the girl's father (Jeeva). In this process, they successfully conducted their marriage. This incident impressed Maha with Jai's actions. Later, she accepts her family's marriage proposal to save her father's reputation, and after knowing this, Jai was heartbroken again. Later, Maha realises she is loving Jai and decides to call off the marriage. Meanwhile, with his friends encouragement, he comes to her hometown to confess his feelings for her.

In the meeting, they both confessed their feelings toward each other, and suddenly they eloped again. Jai asks about her father, and Maha reveals that, actually, her father gave her the idea to leave the marriage. Then, after reaching Hyderabad, they meet again the Muslim girls father, who avenges on them, but suddenly he gets a call from his party's high command that he got an MLA seat for the upcoming elections because of his daughter's marriage. He forgets his revenge and leaves them. Later, Jai's friends reveal to them that the call was a hoax, which they called to save them. Then the film ends with all being chased by the gang.

== Cast ==
- Varun Sandesh as Jai
- Hariprriya as Sitamahalakshmi 'Maha'
- Honey Rose
- Jeeva
- Chalapathi Rao
- Delhi Rajeswari
- Y. Kasi Viswanath
- Hema
- Dhanraj
- Venu Madhav
- Prabhas Sreenu
- Khayyum
- Ravi Babu
- Siva Reddy

== Soundtrack ==
Music of the film was composed by Anil Gopi Reddy.

| No. | Title | Lyrics | Singer(s) | Length |
|---|---|---|---|---|
| 1. | "Bhoommida Beauty" | Sree Mani | Rahul Sipligunj, Anil Gopi Reddy | 3:45 |
| 2. | "Jarigedi Jaragani" | Sree Mani | Pranavi | 3:45 |
| 3. | "O Konchem Kotthaga" | Ramajogayya Sastry | Deepu | 3:28 |
| 4. | "Nee Navvu Tharalle" | Vijaya Balaji | Anil Gopi Reddy | 4:29 |
| 5. | "Manasa Manasa" | Ramajogayya Sastry | Hemachandra | 3:38 |
