= Varun Sandesh =

Indian American actor

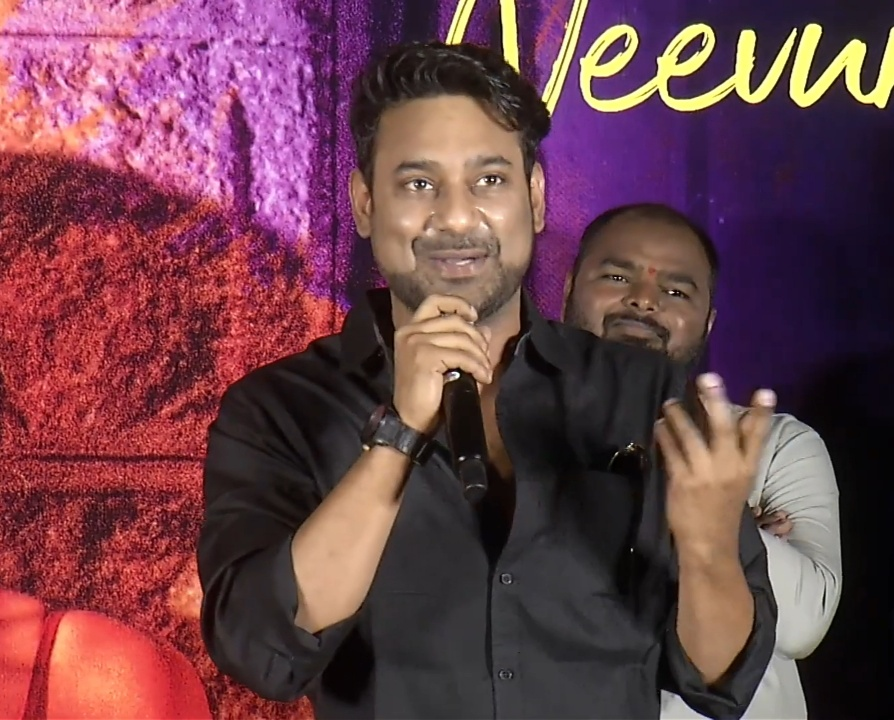
- Varun Sandesh in 2023
- Born: 21 July 1989 (age 37); Rayagada, Odisha, India
- Occupation: Film actor
- Years active: 2007–present
- Spouse: Vithika Sheru

Jeedigunta Varun Sandesh (born 21 July 1989) is an Indian actor known primarily for his works in Telugu cinema. He made his debut with Sekhar Kammula's coming-of-age blockbuster drama Happy Days (2007), and went on to star in films such as Kotha Bangaru Lokam (2008), Kurradu (2009), Yemaindi Ee Vela (2010), D for Dopidi (2013), Pandavulu Pandavulu Thummeda (2014), Mama Manchu Alludu Kanchu (2015),Michael (2023) and Nindha (2024). In 2019, Sandesh appeared in Telugu reality TV show Bigg Boss 3 as a contestant and finished as a finalist.

== Personal life ==
Varun Sandesh was born in Rayagada, Odisha and later lived in Hyderabad for four years. His family then moved to Bridgewater Township, New Jersey, in the United States, where he was educated. Varun Sandesh is the grandson of noted Telugu writer Jeedigunta Ramachandra Murthy, who worked for All India Radio for 28 years in Hyderabad. His uncle Jeedigunta Sridhar is a popular Telugu television personality in Hyderabad, India. He has one younger sister, Veena Sahithi, who has worked as a singer and lyricist in Nandini Reddy's Ala Modalaindi.

Sandesh and actress Shraddha Das, who was his co-star in Maro Charitra, had a short-lived relationship in 2011. Varun got engaged with actress Vithika Sheru whom he met in Paddanandi Premalo Mari (2015) on 7 December 2015, and they went on to get married.

== Career ==
In 2007, Sandesh applied for auditions for a Sekhar Kammula film through an online advertisement, despite having no prior acting experience and previously planning to pursue medical studies.

He received a reply of one scene's film script, which he was asked to act out and send back. He shot and sent video clippings of himself to Kammula, which promptly landed him a lead role in the film Happy Days. Featuring an ensemble cast, comprised almost entirely with newcomers, Happy Days was a major critical and commercial success, winning several accolades, including six Filmfare Awards South and three Nandi Awards.

He then starred in romantic drama Kotha Bangaru Lokam (2008), which received critical acclaim and went on to become one of the biggest blockbusters of the year. Sandesh followed this initial success by starring in a number of films that did not perform well at the box office, including action film Kurradu (2009), a remake of the 2007 Tamil hit film Polladhavan, and romantic drama Maro Charitra (2010), a remake of the K. Balachander-directed 1978 blockbuster of the same title, which starred Kamal Haasan. Sandesh's career prospects declined further following a series of box office flops through the 2010s, with his only successes being the romantic comedy Yemaindi Ee Vela (2010), crime comedy D for Dopidi (2013), and ensemble comedy Pandavulu Pandavulu Thummeda (2014).

In 2019, Sandesh became a notable television personality for his participation in Star Maa's reality TV show Bigg Boss Telugu 3, reaching the grand finale and finishing in 4th place. Sandesh is also the brand ambassador for the Kalanjali store in Andhra Pradesh, India.

== Filmography ==
=== Films ===
Key
†	Denotes films that have not yet been released

Year	Title	Role	Notes
2007	Happy Days	Chandrashekar "Chandu"	
2008	Kotha Bangaru Lokam	Balu	
2009	Evaraina Epudaina	Venkat	
2009	Kurradu	Varun	
2010	Maro Charitra	Balu	
2010	Happy Happy Ga	Santosh	
2010	Yemaindi Ee Vela	Seenu	
2011	Kudirithe Kappu Coffee	Venu	
2011	Brahmi Gadi Katha	Siva	
2011	Priyudu	Karthik	
2013	Chammak Challo	Shyam	Also playback singer
2013	Priyathama Neevachata Kushalama	Varun	
2013	Saradaga Ammayitho	Santosh	
2013	Abbai Class Ammai Mass	Sri	
2013	D for Dopidi	Vicky	
2014	Nuvvala Nenila	Krishna Mohan	
2014	Pandavulu Pandavulu Thummeda	Varun	
2014	Ee Varsham Sakshiga	Jai	
2015	Paddanandi Premalo Mari	Ram	
2015	Mama Manchu Alludu Kanchu	Goutham Naidu	
2015	Lava Kusa	Prem / Kushal	Dual role
2016	Mister 420	Avinash	
2018	Marla Puli	Varun	
2019	Nuvvu Thopu Raa	Kaushik	Cameo appearance
2022	Induvadana	Vasu	25th film
2023	Michael	Amarnath	
2023	Organic Mama Hybrid Alludu	Actor	Cameo appearance
2024	Nindha	Vivek	
2024	Viraaji	Andy	
2025	Racharikam	Vivek Reddy	
2025	Constable	Kashi	
2025	Nayanam	Nayan	Web series; Released on ZEE5
2026	Naa Wife Missing	Balu	Released on Aha
TBA	Yadbhaavam Tadbhavati †	TBA	Filming
TBA	Chitram Chudara †	TBA	Announced

=== Television ===
Year	Tite	Role	Network	Notes
2018	Hey Krishna	Krishna	Yupp TV	
2019	Bigg Boss 3	Contestant	Star Maa	3rd Runner up

=== Music video ===
Varun Sandesh music video credits
Year	Title	Role	Singer	Composer	Language	Ref.
2016	"Tumse Kehna Tha"	Varun	Yazin Nizar	Joell Mukherjee	Hindi	
