= Yemaindi Ee Vela =

- Movie poster
- Directed by: Sampath Nandi
- Written by: Sampath Nandi
- Produced by: K.K. Radha Mohan , Ramana Rao Rudrapati
- Starring: Varun Sandesh; Nisha Agarwal; Nisha Shah; Shashank
- Cinematography: K. Bujji
- Music by: Chakri
- Distributed by: SLV Media
- Release date: 12 November 2010
- Country: India
- Language: Telugu
- Box office: ₹10 crore (US$1.1 million) (50 Days Collection)

Yemaindi Ee Vela (English: What happened this moment?) is a 2010 Indian Telugu-language romantic drama film written and directed by Sampath Nandi and produced by K.K. Radha Mohan and Ramana Rao Rudrapati. The film stars Varun Sandesh, Nisha Agarwal, Nisha Shah, and Shashank. The music was composed by Chakri with cinematography by K. Bujji. The film’s title is derived from a song from the 2007 film Aadavari Matalaku Arthale Verule.

The film released on 12 November 2010. It became a commercial success and resuscitated Varun Sandesh's then-declining career, completing a 50-day run. It was later remade in Tamil as Ishtam (2012), with Aggarwal reprising her role and Vimal reprising Sandesh's role.

== Plot ==
Seenu (Varun Sandesh) is getting married for the second time, and he meets Nimisha (Nisha Shah). Avantika (Nisha Aggarwal) is also getting married for the second time and meets Yuva (Shashank). Both of them decide to tell their partners about their past. The flashback reveals how Seenu and Avantika met, fell in love, got married against their parents' wishes, and in no time got separated as well. As their marriages to their new partners approach, all four want to cancel on their wedding day. Seenu and Avantika cancel their respective marriages with the consent of their new partners and reconcile to lead a happy life together.

== Cast ==
- Varun Sandesh as Seenu
- Nisha Agarwal as Avantika Aravalli
- Shashank as Yuva
- Nisha Shah as Nimisha
- M. S. Narayana as Watchman
- Vennela Kishore as Seenu's friend
- Pragathi as Seenu's mother
- Jhansi as Avantika's aunt
- Krishna Bhagavaan as Marriage Registration Office Worker
- Duvvasi Mohan as Pani Puri Seller
- Gundu Sudarshan as Computer Centre Worker
- Junior Relangi as Priest

== Soundtrack ==
Yemaindi Ee Vela

Soundtrack album by Chakri
- Released: 11 October 2012
- Recorded: 2010
- Genre: Film soundtrack
- Label: Madhura Audio
- Producer: Chakri

The audio launch of the film music was held on 11 October 2010 at Hotel Park in Hyderabad. M.L. Kumar Chowdary, Posani Krishna Murali, Allari Naresh, Nani, Tanish, Kajal Aggarwal, Nisha Aggarwal, Chakri, Vennela Kishore, Shashank, Kodi Ramakrishna, Sampath Nandi and others attended the function.

No.	Title	Singer(s)	Length
1.	"Nee Nuvve Musicle"	Chakri, Pavani Ponda
2.	"Nijamena Kada"	Chakri, Kousalya
3.	"Nuvvanee Nenanee"	Deepu, Kousalya (singer)
4.	"Thunigalle Unnavule"	Vasu, Sravana Bhargavi
5.	"Juice"	Geetha Madhuri

== Reception ==
Jeevi of Idlebrain.com rated the film 2.75/5 and wrote, "On a whole, Yemaindi Ee Vela is a bold attempt, but not good enough!"

== Box office ==
The film was declared as a hit and collected ₹10 crore (US$1.1 million) in a fifty-day run at box office.
