= Maro Charitra (2010 film) =

- Love Never Dies
- Directed by: Ravi Yadav
- Written by: K. Balachander
- Dialogues by: Anuradha
- Produced by: Dil Raju; N. M. Pasha; V. Jagan Mohan Reddy
- Starring: Varun Sandesh; Anita Galler; Shraddha Das
- Cinematography: Ravi Yadav
- Edited by: Marthand K. Venkatesh
- Music by: Songs: Mickey J. Meyer; Score: Thaman
- Production companies: Sri Venkateswara Creations; Matinee Entertainment
- Distributed by: Sri Venkateswara Creations
- Release date: 25 March 2010
- Country: India
- Language: Telugu

Maro Charitra (transl. Another history) is a 2010 Indian Telugu-language romantic drama film directed by Ravi Yadav. A remake of the 1978 film of the same name, the film stars Varun Sandesh, newcomer Anita Galler and Shraddha Das. The music is composed by Mickey J Meyer and background score is composed by Thaman. The film was released on 25 March 2010 to negative feedback and was a flop at the box office.

== Plot ==
Balu is a US-born care-free boy. He dropped the course that he was doing because he was missing home and didn't wanted to carry on with his course. His dad tells him off for dropping the course, as he want his son to be like him. He and his dad argue with Balu over every matter, as their points of view don't match. Meanwhile, Swapna, born in India, moved to the US and is Balu's neighbour. She doesn't know English so she doesn't speak when she is outside home, so everyone in the area thinks she is mute and can't speak. When Balu sees Swapna he tried to talk to her but she doesn't reply. He follows her, as he wants to talk to her and want to know her name. One day in the temple where both family was present, Balu sees Swapna talking. One day Swapna tells him that she loves him and want to be with him forever, he also says that he loves her too. But their families dislike one another, as Balu's dad feels Swapna's family is a low class Indian family who don't know how to live in the US. When they find out about Swapna and Balu's love, they both get separated by their family. In order to convince Balu and her family, Swapna tell them that they will have a contract which will say that if Balu and Swapna see or talk to each other in a year's time which includes no texting, e-mail, or messages, their family can get their marriage where ever they like.

Balu moves to New York for a job, where he meets Sandhya, his boss; she is very strict but a nice person. She lost her love and father on same day in car accident, but she didn't move on in her life and still loves her dead lover. Swapna's cousin who likes Swapna comes to the US and wants to marry her. Swapna's mom wants the same, but can't get her married due to the one-year contract. Swapna's cousin creates a misunderstanding and tells Balu that she is marrying him and shows some fake engagement photos. Balu believes him and breaks down and starts dating Sandhya. Swapna's cousin creates the same misunderstanding by telling Swapna that Balu is to wed, but Swapna doesn't believe it. One day Sandhya finds Swapna and Balu's video on his phone and pay a visit to Swapna without telling her that she will soon marry Balu. Swapna in excitement tells Sandhya how much she loves him and their love story. She also tells her that people believe he is marrying another girl, but she doesn't believe as she trusts Balu and will wait forever. Sandhya, who has lost her love before, goes back to New York and tells Balu that it was all misunderstanding, and Swapna still loves him as much she did before and she is waiting for him to return so he should go back to her. After a year when Balu returns, both families break the contract and say that they will not let this marriage happen. Balu and Swapna jump off a waterfall in front of their parents, telling them that if they can't let them live happily they rather die. Swapna and Balu's parents believe that they are dead but the truth is that they came out live from waterfall and ran away so they can live together.

== Cast ==
- Varun Sandesh as Balu
- Anita Galler as Swapna
- Shraddha Das as Sandhya
- Aadarsh Balakrishna as Maddy
- Pratap K. Pothen as Vijayakumar, Balu's father
- Janaki Sabesh as Snehalatha, Balu's mother
- Thalaivasal Vijay as Jagadeesh, Swapna's father
- Urvashi as Durga, Swapna's mother
- Naresh as Police Officer
- Kota Srinivasa Rao as Lakshmi Narayana
- Venu Yeldandi as Balu and Sandhya's coworker

== Production ==
A different film titled Maro Charitra starring Deepak and Rambha began production in 2005. Ravi Yadav had seen Maro Charitra (1978) more than 20 times and felt that the film would work in modern day. Telugu American Anita Galler made her film debut. The film was shot in the US, UK, Canada, Dubai, Hyderabad and Vizag.

== Soundtrack ==
Maro Charitra

Soundtrack album by Mickey J Meyer
- Released: 14 February 2010
- Recorded: 2010
- Genre: Feature film soundtrack
- Length: 26:15
- Language: Telugu
- Label: Aditya Music
- Producer: Mickey J Meyer

Mickey J Meyer chronology
Leader (2010)	Maro Charitra (2010)	Inidhu Inidhu (2010)

The songs were composed by Mickey J Meyer. The music of Maro Charitra was launched at Taramathi – Baradari, Golkonda evening on the eve of Valentine's Day i.e. 14 February 2010. Ram Charan Teja, Anushka, Keeravani, VV Vinayak, Allu Arvind, Chota K Naidu, Bhogavally Prasad, Dasarath, Paidipally Vamsi attended this function as guests. Varun Sandesh, Anita Galler, Shraddha Das, and Adarsh Balakrishna attended from the cast of the movie. Ram Charan launched the audio CD and gave the first unit to VV Vinayak.

Track list
No.	Title	Lyrics	Singer(s)	Length
1.	"Premaney Peray"	Vanamali	Karthik	4:29
2.	"Ye Teega Puvvuno"	Aatreya	Shweta Pandit	3:37
3.	"Bale Bale Magadivoy"	Aatreya, Veturi	Shweta Pandit	4:17
4.	"Ninnu Nannu"	Vanamali	Shweta Pandit, Srimathumitha	4:22
5.	"We Don't Care"	Krishna Chaitanya	Ranjith, Smita, Varun Sandesh	4:36
6.	"Ye Teega Puvvuno (Theme)"	Aatreya	Karthik	4:54
Total length:				26:15

== Reception ==
A critic from Rediff.com rated the film two out of five stars and wrote that "Somehow the remake seems bereft of the spirit and soul which characterised the original!" A critic from The Times of India gave the film the same rating and wrote that "Barring some breath-taking visuals and a couple of touching moments, this remake of the yesteryear classic fails to live up to expectations". Jeevi of Idlebrain.com gave the film the same rating and wrote that "On a whole, Maro Charitra disappoints even if we don’t compare it with the classic".
