= Kurradu =

- Directed by: Sandeep Gunnam
- Based on: Polladhavan (Tamil)
- Produced by: P. Kiran
- Starring: Varun Sandesh; Neha Sharma; P. Ravi Shankar
- Cinematography: Sarvesh Murari
- Edited by: Marthand K. Venkatesh
- Music by: Achu
- Production company: Anandi Art Creations
- Release date: 12 November 2009
- Country: India
- Language: Telugu

Kurradu (English: Boy) is a 2009 Indian Telugu language action thriller film, directed by Sandeep Gunnam, the son of Gunnam Gangaraju. The film stars Varun Sandesh and Neha Sharma. The film was released on 12 November 2009. It was a remake of Tamil language film Polladhavan. The film was released to mixed review with critics praising the storyline while criticising the actors. The film was a box office failure.

== Plot ==
Varun (Varun Sandesh), the son of a middle-class man (Tanikella Bharani), is fit for nothing in the beginning. Though he wants to do something with his life, he knows he cannot get a job, just as he cannot get a costly education, as his father is not someone who can bribe like a rich men for a job to his son. On the night of his birthday, he spills out his frustration to his father, who beats him for consuming liquor. The next morning, Varun's father gives away the sum he has saved for his daughter's wedding to Varun. The lad, who has been dreaming of owning a bike, gets one and whizzes off in life. A lucky talisman for him, he develops an emotional attachment to it as he sees it as the reason for his upward mobility. Since it entered his life, he has gotten everything he had desired: his father's affection, a job, and Hema's (Neha Sharma) love, for which he has been thirsting for two years now.

But there is more to what meets the eye. In an ironic twist, the same 'charm' turns out to be his nightmare. The society where Varun is fulfilling his ordinary dreams is also the play field for drug peddlers and the ganja mafia headed by Satya (P. Ravi Shankar) and his right-hand bullet. The leitmotif is, of course, the bike. The innocent jobholder at a private bank is dragged into a bestial world. Unlike his nemesis, all Varun wants is his bike back.

Varun finds out that his bike was stolen by a petty bike thief who turns out to be in connection with Satya's egoistical younger brother Ravi. Varun tracks down the culprit and hands him over to the local police station. A formal complaint is lodged against the culprit on the same night. Later that night, Varun confesses to his family that his bike was stolen. His family is very upset, but Varun's father assures them that the bike will be found in no time, having developed a feeling of respect for Varun after he became responsible by going for a job. The next morning, Ravi visits Varun's locality and threatens him to withdraw the complaint against the culprit. When Varun refuses, Ravi pushes Varun's father during the argument, which prompts Varun to hit Ravi.

Ravi's accomplices arrive at the scene, and Varun manages to fight them all, leaving Ravi beaten and embarrassed among the public. Satya returns home on bail after a murder charge. When he finds out what happened to Ravi, he gets furious and sends his henchmen to attack Varun without knowing the reason for his brother's embarrassment. Varun, along with Kumar (Venu Yeldhandi), meets Satya at his own residence in Dhoolpet. Ravi is not home at that time. Varun tells the truth to Satya, but the latter refuses to believe that Ravi and his men stole his bike. After hearing from his close ally Bullet, Satya believes Varun, apologizing and promising Varun that he will do whatever he can to get his bike back, and orders Ravi to stop the attack on Varun, but unknown of the facts, Ravi wantedly makes duff year and orders an attack on thinking of Varun coming. Then Varun's father, who receives the attack from Ravi's men, He was admitted to a hospital, and Varun broke down after knowing that his father would never walk again after his right leg was paralyzed by the attack.

Satya, Ravi, and their men visit Varun to condole and apologize for what happened this time. Varun turns down the apology, and again, an immediate fight is about to break out between Varun and Ravi before Satya separates them both, blaming Ravi for the ordeal caused. The attack on his father makes Varun realize how much he loves his father and swears to protect his family at any cost. Although he wants to stay away, Varun invariably gets dragged into rubbing shoulders, caused by Ravi's antics, who now targets his family to seek revenge. Varun's bike is caught by the NCB, and they nab him, suspecting him of drug smuggling in his bike. They release him after Varun tells them that his bike was stolen and shows them his FIR copy, but he does not tell them about Ravi or Satya.

Varun learns that his bike was stolen by Satya's men to escape from a murder scene, but it was Ravi who smuggled drugs in his bike's petrol tank. Meanwhile, Varun lost his job as an employee at his workplace since his bike was a source of transportation, and he was kept in police custody for one night. He also gets despair from Hema's father for being unwillingly involved with Satya's men. Meanwhile, Ravi makes one more attempt at Varun's life, but he is snubbed again by Varun. Satya becomes unhappy about this and warns him to quit smuggling if he ever gets into Satya's business anymore. Ravi accuses Satya of being a non-caring brother, and Bullet intervenes and warns Ravi to mind his language. Surprisingly, Satya himself comes in support of his brother to lash out at Bullet.

Bullet separates briefly from Satya after this conflict. The next day, Satya and Ravi get attacked by unknown gangsters when they are traveling in their car outside the city. Satya asks his brother to stay inside the car and handle the killers on his own. He gets brutally injured only to find out that he has been stabbed by his own brother Ravi. The attack was arranged by Ravi himself to kill Satya. Ravi delivers the killer blow before telling Satya that Satya is too complacent about Varun and he is going to kill him, after which Satya dies. Ravi creates a scene among Satya's family and henchmen. Bullet, who is not aware of the mastermind behind the assault on Satya,

Bullet gets furious and vows to kill every enemy of his mentor, Satya, including Varun. Varun eventually gets his bike back but is disheartened when he finds it vandalized, so he takes it to the service center for restoration. While there, he learns that Ravi is after him and his family. He first goes to save Hema. After securing her, he goes to save his family. He thinks that the only way to stop this is to confront Ravi himself. He takes down all the men sent by Ravi who come in his way.

Meanwhile, Varun's family is chased down in Kumar's auto rickshaw by Ravi's men. Varun finds Ravi hiding in an ice factory and engages in a fight with him. Varun overpowers Ravi during the fight; the latter tries to escape from him but finds the shutter of the ice factory blocked. Varun manages to subdue Ravi under the knife, threatening him to ask his men to leave Varun's family, which he does, and his men spare Varun's family and Kumar

When Varun is about to leave, Ravi provokes him to continue the fight until his death. Varun manages to dodge Ravi's swing of his knife and gets a steel rod to knock him down fatally. Bullet arrives at the scene after having learned through a supplier who orchestrated the drug racket through Ravi and was eventually killed by Bullet, i.e., Ravi, who orchestrated Satya's death. Hence, he was the one who had blocked the shutter of the ice factory as Ravi tried to flee. Bullet smiles at Varun and lets him go while he stares down at Ravi's corpse, satisfied that Varun had done his job for him, avenging Satya's death and remembering his words about Varun: "He is fearless and should be spared." Varun leaves the scene on his beloved Apache bike.

== Cast ==
- Varun Sandesh as Varun
- Neha Sharma as Hema
- Tanikella Bharani as Varun's father
- M. S. Narayana
- Ali as Jeelani
- P. Ravi Shankar as Satya
- Pragathi as Varun's mother
- Surekha Vani as Satya's wife
- Sivannarayana Naripeddi as Varun's friend
- Venu Yeldandi as Auto Kumar
- Pawan as Bullet, Satya's right hand

== Soundtrack ==
Kurradu

Soundtrack album to Kurradu by Achu
- Released: 10 September 2009
- Recorded: 2009
- Genre: Feature film soundtrack
- Language: Telugu
- Label: Aditya Music
- Producer: Achu

Achu chronology
Nenu Meeku Telusa? (2008)	Kurradu (2009)	Maalai Pozhudhin Mayakathilaey (2012)

The music of Kurradu was composed by Achu and launched at Prasad Labs on the morning of 10 September 2009. Ram Charan Teja, Puri Jagannadh, S. S. Rajamouli, M. M. Keeravani, Ramesh Prasad, Rama Rajamouli, Gunnam Gangaraju, Urmila Gunnam, Madhumita, Neha Sharma, Koti, Achu, and Anantha Sreeram attended the function. Ram Charan Teja launched the audio cassette and gave the first copy to Puri Jagannadh. S. S. Rajamouli launched the audio CD and gave it to M. M. Keeravani.

The songs were instant chartbusters and the platinum disc function of Kurradu was organized at FNCC on the morning of 2 November 2009. It was attended by Gemini Kiran, Sandeep Gunnam, Varun Sandesh, Anant Sreeram, Madhumita and Achu. Gemini Kiran presented the platinum discs to all the unit members.

Song title	Singers	Lyricist
"Rock On"	Tippu, Madhumitha	Anantha Sreeram
"Emantave"	Karthik	Anantha Sreeram
"Kurralloy Kurallu"	S. P. Balasubrahmanyam	Anantha Sreeram
"Sarle Vadiley"	K. S. Chithra	Anantha Sreeram
"Raja Na Raja"	Suchitra	Anantha Sreeram

== Reception ==
Jeevi of Idlebrain.com wrote, "The filmmakers could able to remake the scenes, but couldn't translate the much required soul in to the Telugu version".
