= Ankith Koyya =

Indian actor

- Born: 20 June 1995 (age 31); Visakhapatnam, Andhra Pradesh, India
- Education: Gandhi Institute of Technology and Management (BTech)
- Occupation: Actor
- Years active: 2016–present

Ankith Koyya (born 20 June 1995) is an Indian actor who appears in Telugu films. He has first appeared in the short film Yedhane Vadili Vellipomake (2016), for which he won SIIMA Short Film Award for Best Supporting Actor – Telugu. His debuted into feature films by playing a supporting role in the sports drama Majili (2019) and extended to adult role in Johaar (2020). His first streaming television show was 9 Hours (2022). His major breakthrough films were Aay and Maruthi Nagar Subramanyam (both 2024), in which his performance was appreciated.

== Early life ==
Ankith was born on 20 June 1995 in Visakhapatnam, India. He studied till Tenth Class at Timpany School and completed Intermediate education at Narayana Junior College. He then pursued Bachelor of Technology in Computer science and engineering from Gandhi Institute of Technology and Management.

== Career ==
Ankith was an active participant in street plays, pantomimes, and many other cultural programs in school and college. He was interested in acting and tried his hand at opportunities while studying B.Tech. He has first appeared in a commercial advertisement of OLX alongside Allu Arjun, in April 2016. He then worked in the short film Yedhane Vadili Vellipomake (2016), before his feature film debut in Majili (2019). Johaar (2020) is his first film in which he played the lead role. Due to COVID-19 pandemic in India, it had a direct-to-video release on Aha. He next appeared in an important supporting role in Thimmarusu (2021). He had three major releases in 2024 – Satyabhama, Aay and Maruthi Nagar Subramanyam, in which the latter two were his breakthrough films.

== Filmography ==
Year	Title	Role	Notes
2016	Yedhane Vadili Vellipomake	Ankith	Short film
2019	Majili	Masthan	Feature film debut
2019	Ala	Snehith	
2020	Aswathama	Manoj Kumar	Child Artist
2020	Johaar	Siddhu	Debut in adult role
2021	Thimmarusu	Vasu Gopisetty	
2021	Ooriki Uttharana	Siddhu	
2021	Shyam Singha Roy	Bunny	
2023	Jilebi	Bobby	
2024	Satyabhama	Rishi Reddy	
2024	Aay	Hari	
2024	Maruthi Nagar Subramanyam	Arjun	Debut in lead role
2024	Bachchala Malli	Bachchala Ramana	
2025	14 Days Girlfriend Intlo	Harsha	
2025	Beauty	Arjun	
2026	Missing Meghana	Akash	
2026	Garividi Lakshmi	Rajesh	
TBA	Simple Santosh †	TBA	
TBA	Jaan Say †	TBA	Delayed

=== Television ===
Year	Title	Role	Network	Notes
2022	9 Hours	Nandakumar	Disney+ Hotstar	
2022	Modern Love Hyderabad	Aadi	Amazon Prime Video	Episode 6; Cameo appearance
2023	Good Old Days	Santosh	JioCinema	
2025	Katha Sudha	Sundara Ramayya Panthulu alias Sundaram	ETV Win	under segment "Sundaram Gadi Prema Katha"

=== Music video ===
Year	Title	Performers	Notes
2024	"Chilaka"	Vijai Bulganin, Lakshmi Meghana, Suresh Banisetti	Co-featuring Deepthi Sunaina

== Awards and nominations ==
Award	Year	Category	Work	Result	Ref.
SIIMA Short Film Awards	2017	Best Supporting Actor – Telugu	Yedhane Vadili Vellipomake	Won	
South Indian International Movie Awards	2021	Best Male Debut – Telugu	Johaar	Nominated	
