= Sreerama Chandra =

Indian playback singer (born 1986)

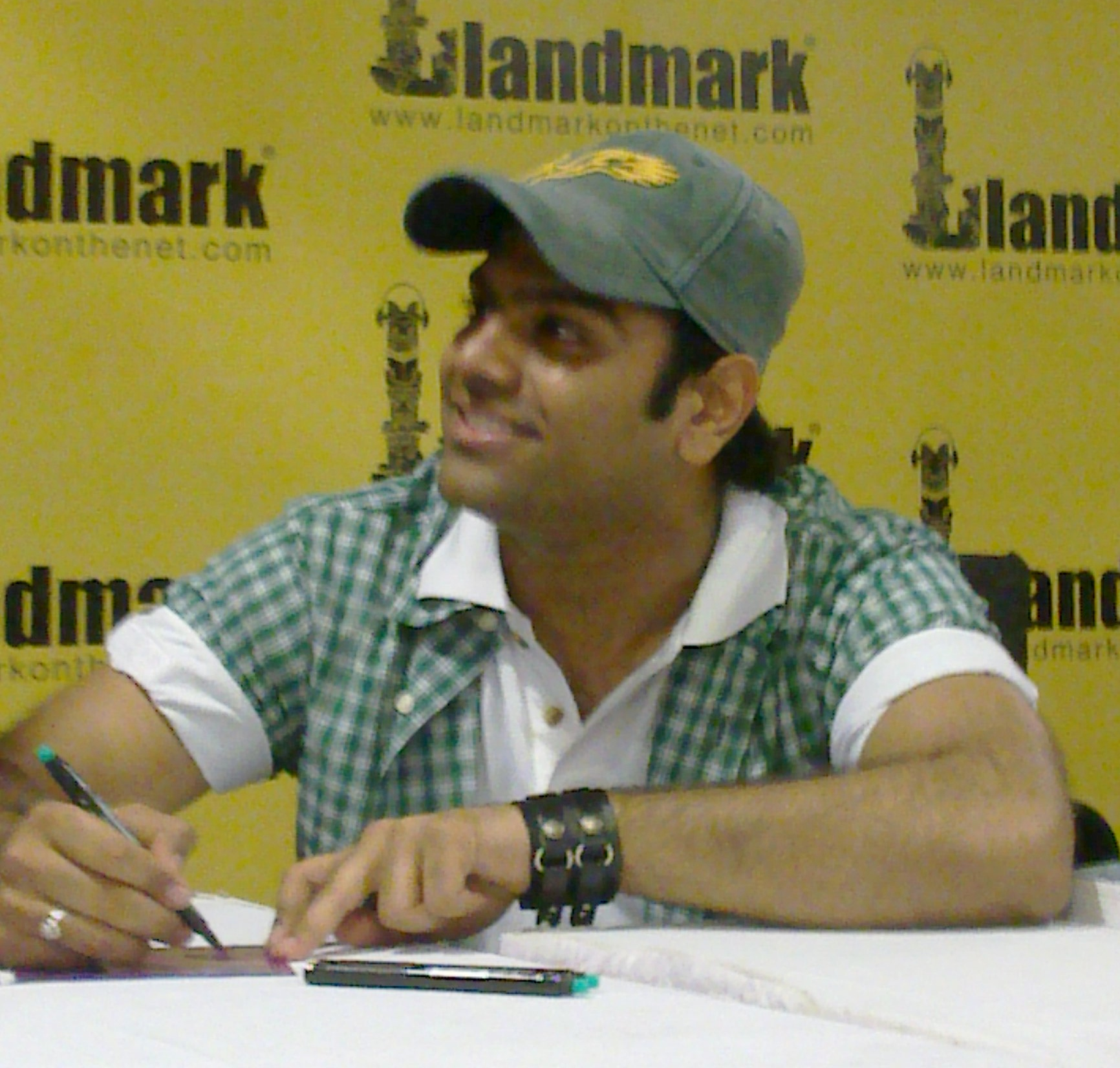
- Sreeram Chandra in 2010

Background information
- Born: Sreerama Chandra Mynampati; 19 January 1986 (age 40); Addanki, Andhra Pradesh, India
- Genre: Playback singing
- Occupations: Singer and actor
- Instruments: Vocals, guitar
- Years active: 2008–present
- Website: sreeramachandra.in

Sreerama Chandra Mynampati (born 19 January 1986) is an Indian playback singer and actor, recognised for his work in Telugu films and television, as well as for hosting music shows. He began his career in 2008 as a playback singer in Telugu with ETV shows Okkare and Sye Singers Challenge. In 2010, he gained prominence by winning the fifth season of the music reality show Indian Idol. He made his acting debut in 2013 with the Telugu film Jagadguru Adi Shankara. In 2021, he participated in Bigg Boss Telugu 5, finishing as the second runner-up. Sreerama also hosted the first season of Telugu Indian Idol, which premiered on 25 February 2022. He appeared as Kranthi in the film Papam Pasivadu, which premiered on 29 September 2023, alongside Rashi Singh, Srividya Maharshi, Gayatri Changanti, and Ashok Kumar.

He won the Filmfare Award for Best Male Playback Singer – Telugu for the song "O Rendu Prema Meghaalila" from Baby in 2024.

== Personal life ==
Sreerama Chandra was born in Addanki, a town in the Prakasam district of Andhra Pradesh. His father is a High Court advocate, while his mother is a housewife. Despite a non-musical background, Sreerama Chandra enjoyed singing and started singing during his school days, learning from N.Ch.Parthasarathy, and continued during his college days.

He attended St. Andrews School, Bowenpally, Secunderabad and graduated (B.Tech) from the Royal Institute of Technology and Science (RITS). He learned music at Sri Bhakta Ramadasu Govt. College of Music And Dance, Secunderabad from Bhaskara Haripriya (one of the Hyderabad Sisters).

== Career ==
He completed his fifth year of his certificate course in Carnatic vocal at Sri Bhakta Ramadasa Music College, Marredpally, Secunderabad. After he participated in ETV's Sye, a singing reality show, Telugu film music director Mickey J. Meyer recognised Sreeram's talent and gave him the opportunity to sing "Chirugalithone Adiga" for the movie Notebook.

He worked on an advertising campaign with Suzuki that featured Salman Khan. He released his debut Hindi album, Rehnuma, in 2010, dedicating it to his loved ones. He also recorded a music album called Crazy Love.

In 2021, Chandra participated as a contestant in the reality TV show Bigg Boss Telugu season 5. He finished as the second runner-up.

He starred in Papam Pasivadu, which aired on Aha, in the lead role alongside Rashi Singh.

== Competitions ==
- Finalist and 1st Runner-up of Jo Jeeta Wohi Super Star 2 in 2012
- Winner of Indian Idol Season 5 on Sony Entertainment Television in 2010 (19 March to 15 August).
- Winner of Okkare conducted by ETV in 2008 (June–December).
- Reached Top 18 of Amul STAR Voice of India in March 2007.
- Finalist in Sye Singer's Challenge conducted in 2006–07, by ETV.
- Qualified for Delhi Finals Sangam Kala Group (Delhi), conducted in November 2006, by Hero Honda.
- Winner of radio competition Voice of Andhra, conducted in 2005–06 by FM radio.
- Runner-up in Relax songs competition conducted by Ramana Gogula in 2005.
- Winner of Ananda Ragam Contest conducted by the team from Anand in 2004.
- Runner-up of The Remix season 1 on Amazon Prime Video India in 2018.
- 2nd Runner-up of Bigg Boss Telugu 5 in 2021.

== Achievements and performances ==
- He began performing shows at the age of 8 and has performed many stage shows, including classical and film music.
- He has performed with singers such as Mano, Malathi, and Sunitha, and has also done shows with Limca.
- He has performed with Koti, M. M. Keeravani, Madhavpeddi Suresh, Vandemataram Srinivas, Ghantadi Krishna, and many other music directors.
- He sang three songs on the audio CD Sabari Gireesha Saranam, composed by Mantha Srinivas.
- His first performance in Hyderabad was on 25 September 2010.
- He performed at the 2010 Commonwealth Games closing ceremony in New Delhi with singers such as Shankar Mahadevan, Shreya Ghoshal, and Sunidhi Chauhan.

== Awards ==
- Sreerama won the Lata Mangeshkar Award from the Andhra Pradesh Government.
- He was awarded the P. B. Sreenivas Award on 19 October by singer P. B. Sreenivas at Ravindra Bharathi, Hyderabad.
- Sreerama received the Ghantasala Award on 4 December.
- He won the Indian Idol 5 contest on 15 August 2010.
- At GIMA 2011, Sreerama won Best Music Debut for Rehnuma in the non-film music category.
- Filmfare Award for Best Male Playback Singer – Telugu for "O Rendu Prema Meghaalila" from Baby.

== Discography ==
Year	Song	Film	Language	Music director	Lyricist	Co-singer(s)	Note
2024	"Arere Arere (Sad)"	Roti Kapda Romance	Telugu	RR Dhruvan	Raghuram		
2024	"Sarphira"	Chandu Champion	Hindi	Pritam	Kausar Munir		
2024	"Sankellu"	Nindha	Telugu	Santhu Omkar	Kittu Vissupragada		
2023	"Not Ramaiya Vastavaiya (Tamil)"	Jawan (D)	Tamil	Anirudh Ravichander	Vivek	Anirudh Ravichander, Rakshita Suresh	
2023	"Not Ramaiya Vastavaiya (Telugu)"	Jawan (D)	Telugu	Anirudh Ravichander	Chandrabose	Anirudh Ravichander, Rakshita Suresh	
2023	"O Rendu Prema"	Baby	Telugu	Vijay Bulganin	Anantha Sriram		
2023	"O Rendu Prema"(Reprise)	Baby	Telugu	Vijay Bulganin	Anantha Sriram		
2022	"Rave Rave"	Crazy Fellow	RR Dhruvan	Alaraju	Satya Yamini		
2022	"Mere Dholna" (Father Version)	Bhool Bhulaiyaa 2	Hindi	Pritam	Sameer		Not included in the film's soundtrack; only heard in the film itself.
2022	"Private Party"	Don	Telugu	Anirudh	Srinivasa Moorthy	Anirudh, Sahithi Chaganti	
2022	"Padara Sainika"	Godfather	Telugu	S. Thaman	Ramajogayya Sastry		
2022	"Chalo Chalo Sainiko"	Godfather	Hindi	S. Thaman	Ramajogayya Sastry		
2022	"Beast Mode"	Beast (D)	Hindi	Anirudh	Raqueeb Alam	Anirudh	
2022	"Beast Mode"	Beast (D)	Telugu	Anirudh	Chandrabose	Anirudh	
2021	"Manasa Vinava"	Nootokka Jillala Andagadu	Telugu	Shakthikanth Karthick	Bhaskarabhatla		
2021	"Aapki Nazron Ne Samjha"	Aapki Nazron Ne Samjha	Hindi	Sargam Basu, Nakash Aziz			TV Series
2021	"Woh Muskaana Aankhon Ka"	Master	Hindi	Anirudh			
2019	"Anaganaganaga"	Oh! Baby	Telugu	Mickey J. Meyer	Lakshmi Bhupal		
2019	"Dil Hi To Hai" Reprise	The Sky is Pink	Hindi	Pritam	Javed Akhtar	Antara Mitra	
2019	"Fikar Not"	Chhichhore	Hindi	Pritam	Amitabh Bhattacharya	Dev Negi, Antara Mitra, Nakash Aziz, Amit Mishra, Amitabh Bhattacharya	
2018	"Allah Duhai Hai"	Race 3	Hindi	JAM8 (Tushar Joshi)	Shabbir Ahmed, Shole Shanky, Raja Kumari	Jonita Gandhi, Amit Mishra, Raja Kumari	
2018	"Manzilein"	Bharta	Hindi	Sukumar Dutta	Kunaal Vermaa		Short film
2018	"Touch Chesi Chudu"	Touch Chesi Chudu	Telugu	JAM8			
2017	"Closer x Channa Mereya"	Cover for FourHead Music	Hindi				
2017	"Let Me Love You x Enna Sona"	Cover	Hindi				
2017	"Pee Loon x Ishq Sufiyana"	T-Series Mixtape	Hindi	Abhijit Vaghani			
2017	Zaalima (Remix)	Raees	Hindi	JAM8	Amitabh Bhattacharya		
2016	"En Oruthiye"	Koditta Idangalai Nirappuga	Tamil	C.Sathya	Kabilan		
2016	"Kilukilu Payaai"	Koditta Idangalai Nirappuga	Tamil	C.Sathya	R. Parthiepan		
2016	"Papparamittai"	Velainu Vandhutta Vellaikaaran	Tamil	C.Sathya	Yugabharathi		
2016	"Mari Maree"	M. S. Dhoni: The Untold Story (Telugu Dub)	Telugu	Amaal Mallik	Chaitanya Prasad		Telegu counterpart of "Phir Kabhi"
2016	"Pougalaam"	M. S. Dhoni: The Untold Story (Tamil Dub)	Tamil	Amaal Mallik	Pa. Vijay		Tamil counterpart of "Phir Kabhi"
2016	"Dhundicha Kshan Ha Ola"	M. S. Dhoni: The Untold Story (Marathi Dub)	Marathi	Amaal Mallik	Guru Thakur		Marathi counterpart of "Phir Kabhi"
2016	"Munna Re"	Munna Re – Short Film	Hindi	Pranshu Jha			
2016	"Nee Choopu Thakagane"	Swardham	Telugu	Kabir Rafi	Kishore Babu Sambangi		
2016	"Brahmotsavam"	Brahmotsavam	Telugu	Mickey J Meyer	Sirivennela Seetharama Sastry		
2016	"Haal-E-Dil (Male)"	Sanam Teri Kasam	Hindi	Himesh Reshammiya	Sameer Anjaan		
2016	"Aafreen" (2nd version)	1920: London	Hindi	JAM8			
2015	"Naseeba (Reprise)"	Wedding Pullav	Hindi	Salim–Sulaiman	Irfan Siddique		
2015	"Yolo"	All Is Well	Hindi	Himesh Reshammiya			
2015	"Andaniki Nirvachanam"	365 Days	Telugu	Nag Srivatsav	Sirasri		
2015	"Ninne Choostunna"	Lava Kusa	Telugu				
2014	"Aa Roje Tolisari"	Pilla Nuvvu Leni Jeevitham	Telugu	Anup Rubens	Sirivennela Seetharama Sastry		
2014	"Sravani for King Fisher Back Stage"		Telugu				
2014	"Kanupapalo "	I Am in Love	Telugu				
2014	"Kshaminchave Cheli"	Nee Jathaga Nenundali	Telugu	Jeet Gannguli	Chandrabose		Telugu remake of "Bhula Dena" from Aashiqui 2
2014	"Ee Pichchey Premani"	Nee Jathaga Nenundali	Telugu	Jeet Gannguli	Chandrabose	Palak Muchhal	Telugu remake of "Hum Mar Jayenge" from Aashiqui 2
2014	"Sirf Yaari Hai, Ya Ishqdaari Hai"	Izhaar Maine Kiya Nahi	Hindi	Neeraj Shrivastava	Samsher Singh "Beniyaaz"		
2014	"Moda Thumbiruvaaga"	Rangan Style	Kannada				
2014	"Ye Huduga"	Rose	Anoop Seelin		Kannada		
2014	"Sorry Ri Sorry"	Rose		Dr. V. Nagendra Prasad			
2013	"Prema Geema"	Prema Geema Jantha Nahi	Telugu				
2013	"Papalo Aaduko"						
2013	"Tappucheddam"	Preminchali					
2013	"Premincha"	Toofan (Telugu Version)	Telugu	Chirrantan Bhatt	Chandrabose	Shalmali Kholgade	Telugu counterpart of "Lamha Tera Mera"
2013	"Subhaanallah"	Yeh Jawani Hai Deewani	Hindi	Pritam	Amitabh Bhattacharya		
2012	"Yem Cheddam"	Seethamma Vakitlo Sirimalle Chettu	Telugu	Mickey J Meyer	Sirivennela Seetharama Sastry		
2012	"Meghallo"	Seethamma Vakitlo Sirimalle Chettu	Telugu	Mickey J Meyer	Sirivennela Seetharama Sastry		
2012	"Mari Antaga"	Seethamma Vakitlo Sirimalle Chettu	Telugu	Mickey J Meyer	Sirivennela Seetharama Sastry		
2012	"Musire Mabbula"	Seethamma Vakitlo Sirimalle Chettu	Telugu	Mickey J Meyer	Sirivennela Seetharama Sastry		
2012	"Naa Manasupai"	Routine Love Story	Telugu	Mickey J Meyer	Ananta Sriram		
2012	"Balma"	Khiladi 786	Hindi	Himesh Reshamiya	Sameer	Shreya Ghoshal	
2012	"Atu Itu"	Life Is Beautiful	Telugu	Mickey J Meyer	Ananta Sriram		
2012	"Life is beautiful (Pop-Rock Version)"	Life Is Beautiful	Telugu	Mickey J Meyer	Ananta Sriram		
2012	"Vasanthame"	Maa Voori Maharshi	Telugu				
2011	"Ammammammo Ammo"	Solo	Telugu	Mani Sharma	Krishna Chaitanya		
2011	"Ishq Risk" (Remix)	Mere Brother Ki Dulhan	Hindi	Sohail Sen	Irshad Kamil		
2011	"Madhubala"	Mere Brother Ki Dulhan	Hindi	Sohail Sen	Irshad Kamil		
2011	"Nachchavura"	Badrinath	Telugu	M. M. Keeravani	M. M. Keeravani, Anantha Sreeram		
2011	"Kannulu Moose"	Maaro	Telugu	Mani Sharma	Samavedam Shanmukha Sarma		
2011	"Gelupu Talupulu"	Theenmaar	Telugu	Mani Sharma	Rahman		
2010	"Kondallo Koyilamma"	Nuvvekkadunte Nenakkadunta	Telugu				
2010	"Unbelievable"	Katha Screenplay Darshakatvam Appalaraju	Telugu	Koti			
2010	"Sarejaha Acha"	Broker	Telugu	R.P.Patnaik			
2010	"Yemavutundhi Gundelo"	Kalyanram Kathi	Telugu	Mani Sharma			
2010	"Nuvvoka Puvvula"	Kothimuka	Telugu	Mani Sharma	Ramajogayya Sastry		
2010	"Nandaamaya"	Andari Banduvaya	Telugu	Anup Rubens			
2009	"YYW"	Prayanam	Telugu	Mahesh Shankar			
2009	"Nuvvu Entha"	Prayanam	Telugu				
2009	"Telisenade Talachenade Jarigindi"	Neramu Siksha(new)	Telugu				
2009	"Ne Medha Naaku"	Nachavu Alludu	Telugu				
2009	"Drohama"	Jallu	Telugu		Sirivennela Seethaarama Sastry		
2009	"Arere Chejarinde"	Boni	Telugu	Ramana Gogula			
2009	"Pragathi S Good Bye"	Boni	Telugu				
2009	"Dds Solitude"	Boni	Telugu				
2009	"Eskora Kallumuntha"	18.20 Love Story	Telugu			Telugu	
2009	"Gunde Napindhi"	18.20 Love Story	Telugu				
2009	"Nammalo Ledo & Tidathara Kodathara"	Ashta Chamma	Telugu	Kalyani Malik	Sirivennela Seetharamasastry	Telugu	
2008	"Jilibili"	Tsunami 7X	Telugu	Ilaya Raja	Veturi Sundararamamurthy	Telugu	
2007	"Chirugaalulato"	Notebook	Telugu	Koti	Veturi Sundararamamurthy	Telugu	
2007	"Jimbo Jimbo"	One	Telugu			Telugu	

== Filmography ==
=== Films ===
Year	Title	Role	Language
2013	Jagadguru Adi Shankara	King Amaraka	Telugu
2014	Prema Geema Jantha Nai	Ram	Telugu
2021	MMOF	Raghava	Telugu
2026	Lechindhi Mahila Lokam	Aravind	Telugu
2026	ENE Repeat	Ankit	Telugu

=== Television ===
Year	Work	Role	Language	Notes
2010	Indian Idol	Contestant	Hindi	Winner
2014–2021	Swarabhishekam	Himself	Telugu	
2019–2020	Wow (season 2-3)	Himself	Telugu	Guest
2021	Bigg Boss 5	Contestant	Telugu	2nd runner-up
2022 & 2024	Telugu Indian Idol	Host	Telugu	
2023	Nenu Super Woman	Host	Telugu	
2023	Papam Pasivadu	Kranti	Telugu	
2023–2024	Jhalak Dikhhla Jaa 11	Contestant	Hindi	Finalist
