= Ram Asur =

2021 film by Venkatesh Triparna

- Directed by: Venkatesh Triparna
- Written by: Venkatesh Triparna
- Produced by: Venkatesh Triparna; Abhinav Sardhar
- Starring: Abhinav Sardhar; Ram Karthik; Chandini Tamilarasan; Sherry Agarwal; Suman
- Cinematography: J. Prabhakara Reddy
- Edited by: Basva Paidireddy
- Music by: Bheems Ceciroleo
- Production companies: ASP Media House; GV Ideas
- Release date: 19 November 2021
- Running time: 132 Minutes
- Country: India
- Language: Telugu

Ram Asur is a 2021 Indian Telugu-language sci-fi drama film written and directed by Venkatesh Triparna. This film is produced under the banners ASP Media House and GV Ideas by Abhinav Sardhar and Venkatesh Triparna. It stars Abhinav Sardhar, Ram Karthik, Chandini Tamilarasan, Sherry Agarwal while Suman and Subhalekha Sudhakar play important roles. The music is composed by Bheems Ceciroleo and cinematography by J. Prabhakara Reddy. Ram Asur was released theatrically on 19 November 2021.

== Plot ==
Ram (Ram Karthik) tries to artificially generate a diamond. No matter how much he tries, he fails in his sincere attempts. His girlfriend Priya (Sherry Agarwal) decides to dump him for a reason. With the aim of limping back in life, he meets an astrologer Ramachari (Shubhalekha Sudhakar) who advises him to meet one Suri (Abhinav Sardhar). Now, Suri comes with an unconventional past. How Ram's tryst with this unusual man unfolds and the repercussions of their coming together is the rest of the story.

== Cast ==
- Abhinav Sardhar as Suri
- Ram Karthik as Ram
- Chandini Tamilarasan as Chandini
- Sherry Agarwal as Priya
- Suman as Balaramaraju
- Subhalekha Sudhakar as Ramachari
- Shaani Salmon as Shiva

== Soundtrack ==
Ram Asur

Soundtrack album by Bheems Ceciroleo
- Released: 2021
- Recorded: 2021
- Genre: Soundtrack
- Producer: Bheems Ceciroleo

Bheems Ceciroleo chronology
FCUK: Father Chitti Umaa Kaarthik (2021)	Ram Asur (2021)	Suraapanam (2022)

Music composed by Bheems Ceciroleo

Tracklist
No.	Title	Lyrics	Singer(s)	Length
1.	"Em Chesavo Maya"	Bheems Ceciroleo	Shrideep	4:02
2.	"Nakashikamuni"	Suresh Upadhyaya	Swathi Reddy	3:09
Total length:				7:11
