= Maa Ramudu Andarivadu =

2026 Indian Telugu-language film

- Directed by: Yeddanapudi Maikil
- Written by: Yeddanapudi Maikil
- Screenplay by: Yeddanapudi Maikil
- Produced by: Anumula Lakshmana Rao; Pallakonda Sriramulu
- Starring: Pallakonda Sriramulu; Swathi Mandadi; Suman; Anumula Lakshmana Rao
- Cinematography: Vinod Kumar
- Edited by: Bharanikanth
- Music by: Manish Kumar (songs composition); Bolla Venkatesh (BGM)
- Release date: September 4, 2026
- Country: India
- Language: Telugu

Maa Ramudu Andarivadu is a 2026 Indian Telugu-language political action drama film directed by Yeddanapudi Maikil, and produced by Anumula Lakshmana Rao and Pallakonda Sriramulu under the Anumula Productions and Sriram Creations banners. The film stars Sriram and Swathi Mandadi in the lead roles, alongside Suman, Anumula Lakshmana Rao, Sammeta Gandhi, Naga Mahesh and Baahubali Prabhakar.

The film blends family, social, action, romance and mythological elements, and is set in contemporary rural Andhra Pradesh. Manish Kumar composed the music, while Bolla Venkatesh provided the background score. Cinematography is handled by Vinod. Tanikella Bharani provided the voice-over for the character of Hanuman.

The film was released in theatres on 4 September 2026.

== Cast ==
- Sriram as Satyam and Ramudu
- Swathi Mandadi
- Anumula Lakshmana Rao as Varadarajulu
- Suman as the chief minister
- Tanikella Bharani as the voice of Hanuman
- Sammeta Gandhi
- Naga Mahesh
- Prabhakar
- Anand Bharathi
- Gaddam Naveen
- Chitti Babu
- Gold Reddy
- Apparao
- Baby Ganishka Randrankshi

== Plot ==
Hanuman narrates stories to a girl named Prakruthi, including the story of a man named Ramudu. Varadarajulu, a violent local leader who has become a member of the legislative assembly, controls a village through fear and intimidation. Satyam, a principled farmer from the same village, opposes Varadarajulu and fights for the welfare of its residents.

Satyam's son Ramudu deeply admires his father, but becomes a Naxalite after growing angry at the injustice occurring in the village. Satyam spends his life attempting to construct a hospital for the villagers. After Varadarajulu's son kills Satyam, Ramudu returns to the village.

How Ramudu exposed the wrongdoings of the villains, and how he discovered his true self in the process of battling against numerous odds is the story.

== Production ==
Director Yaddanapudi Maikil handled the story, dialogues and lyrics for the film in addition to directing it, and choreographed two of its songs. The director said that the team spent close to fourteen months on the project, and that portions of the film were shot in the Maredumilli forest.

The makers released the film's teaser in November 2025. Speaking at the teaser launch, the director described the film as a large scale action film built around family emotions and commercial elements, set in a village backdrop.

The team put in considerable effort on the visual effects for the sequences featuring Hanuman. The scenes in which Hanuman narrates the Ramayana and the computer graphics used in them were positioned as a key attraction of the film.

The film completed post-production and censor formalities in August 2026, and the release date was announced later that month.

== Music ==
The music was composed by Manish Kumar, while Bolla Venkatesh provided the background score. The film features five songs, sung by Nazeer Uddin, Geetha Madhuri, Ramya Behara, Nalgonda Gaddar and Manish Kumar.

All music is composed by Manish Kumar.

No.	Title	Lyrics	Singer(s)	Length
1.	"Kurise Kurise"	Yeddanapudi Maikil	Ramya Behara, Manish Kumar	4:04
2.	"Idisellipoyavaa"	Yeddanapudi Maikil	Nalgonda Gaddar, Yeddanapudi Maikil	4:11
3.	"Samanlu Bagundali"	Yeddanapudi Maikil	Geetha Madhuri, Yeddanapudi Maikil	3:20
4.	"Title Song"			3:25
5.	"Yeteto"			3:51
Total length:				18:51

== Release ==
The film was released theatrically on 4 September 2026 in more than 200 theatres. It has a runtime of 122 minutes.

== Reception ==
TA Kiran Kumar of Zee News Telugu gave the film 2.75/5, describing it as a mass political action drama set in a rural backdrop. wrote that although the revenge premise had been seen in many earlier films, the director's manner of telling the story worked, and that the presence of an entirely new cast made the film feel fresh.

Saketh U of 10TV gave the film 2.5/5, calling it a village-backdrop political revenge action film. The reviewer wrote that the first half moves simply through village conflicts and the father-son bond, with the main story beginning after Ramudu's entry, and that the love track did not work.

Sunil Boddula of telugu.news18 gave the film 2.75/5 rating, and has opined that work of Cinematographer Vinod is good in the way he picturized the greenery of Godavari area and the beauty of the villages in that area. He also stated that the action scenes which entertain the mass audience, a few comedy scenes and some good twists have strengthened the movie.
