= Ram Karthik =

Indian actor

- Born: 2 August 1992 (age 34); Hyderabad, Andhra Pradesh (now in Telangana), India
- Occupation: Actor
- Years active: 2016–present

Ram Karthik is an Indian actor who works in Telugu films.

== Early life and education ==
Ram Karthik was born in Hyderabad. He completed his post graduate studies from Indian Institute of Management Visakhapatnam.

== Filmography ==
Year	Title	Role	Ref
2016	Dhruva	Kamal	
2016	Dhrusyakavyam		
2017	Iddari Madhya 18	Mahi	
2017	Mama O Chandamma	Chanti	
2018	Manchukurisevelalo	Anand	
2019	Where Is the Venkatalakshmi	Shekar	
2019	Akkadokaduntadu	Karthik	
2019	Mouname Ishtam	Varun	
2021	Ram Asur	Ram	
2021	FCUK: Father Chitti Umaa Kaarthik	Karthik	
2023	The Great Indian Suicide	Hemanth	
2024	Veekshanam	Arvin	
2026	Missing Meghana	Karthik	

=== Television ===
Year	Title	Role	Network	Ref
2020	Geetha Subhramanyam	Subhramanyam	Aha	
2020	Anaganaga	Vamsi Acharya	ZEE5	
2023	U and I	Kalyan	ETV Win	
