= Missing Meghana =

2026 Indian Telugu film

- Directed by: Vachaspathy
- Written by: Vanaraj (story & original screenplay)
- Produced by: Naresh Babu P Deevela Sreenivasa Rao
- Starring: Ram Karthik; Ammu Abhirami; Vaidika Senjaliya; Ankith Koyya; Goparaju Ramana
- Cinematography: Shyam K. Naidu
- Edited by: Basawa
- Music by: RR Dhruvan
- Production companies: First Copy Movies; KD & Co
- Release date: 18 September 2026
- Running time: 117 minutes
- Country: India
- Language: Telugu

Missing Meghana is an 2026 Indian Telugu-language Thriller film directed by Vachaspathy. The film stars Ram Karthik, Ammu Abhirami, Vaidika Senjaliya, Ankith Koyya, Goparaju Ramana. Produced by Naresh Babu P and Co-Produced by Deevela Sreenivasa Rao under First Copy Movies and KD & Co banners.

Missing Meghana was theatrically released on 18 September 2026.

== Plot ==
When a young woman named Meghana mysteriously disappears after booking a cab, the police begin an investigation that soon takes a darker turn. The case becomes linked to multiple murders committed in a single night, leading investigators to question Meghana’s true identity and the motives behind her disappearance.

== Cast ==
- Ram Karthik as Karthik
- Ammu Abhirami as Meghana
- Vaidika Senjaliya as Aadhya
- Ankith Koyya as Akash
- Goparaju Ramana as Meghana’s father
- Kaushik as ACP Arjun

== Music ==
The soundtrack and background score were composed by R R Dhruvan.

Track listing
No.	Title	Lyrics	Singer(s)	Length
1.	"Vinnava Prema"	R R Dhruvan	Deepu	2:48
2.	"Pilla Pilla"	R R Dhruvan	Javed Ali	3:30
3.	"Suppanathi Sundari"	Alaraju	Saketh	3:45
4.	"Chinni Papa Chitti Papa"	Alaraju	R R Dhruvan	2.08
Total length:				11.31

== Production ==
The first look of the film was released by V. V. Vinayak on 5 August 2026. The pre release event of the film held on 16 September 2026.

== Release and reception ==
The film was released on 18 September 2026.

Suhas Sistu of The Hans India rated the film 3/5 and said "Missing Meghana is an engaging mystery, good pacing and blend of crime, romance and action kept it entertaining despite some predictable twists and a familiar finale."

Richs Barua of Asianet News gave 2.75/5, describing Missing Meghana as a mystery thriller that keeps viewers engaged with its twists and turns and recommending it to fans of the genre.

Metupelli Sanjiv Kumar of Hindustan Times Telugu also reviewed the film, praising the director's choice of a suspenseful premise while noting the villain's characterisation and some stretched scenes as drawbacks, and said that Missing Meghana could appeal to fans of crime thrillers when watched without high expectations.

Sunil Boddula of News18 Telugu wrote "The film evolves from a missing-person mystery into a crime thriller, with the second-half investigation and lead performances keeping it engaging." Bhargav Chaganti of NTV Telugu rated 2.75/5 and praised cast and crew work.
