= Fighter Shiva =

2025 Indian Telugu film by Prabhas Nimmala

- Directed by: Prabhas Nimmala
- Screenplay by: Prabhas Nimmala
- Produced by: Narsimha Goud; Unnam Ramesh
- Starring: Manikanth Kota; Sunil; Ayra Bansal; Kajal Tiwari; Vikas Vasistha
- Cinematography: Surendra Reddy
- Edited by: RM Vishwanadh Kunchanapally
- Music by: Gowtham Raviram
- Production companies: Koundinya Productions; Arunagiri Arts
- Release date: 19 December 2025
- Running time: 132 minutes
- Country: India
- Language: Telugu

Fighter Shiva is a 2025 Indian Telugu-language Action-thriller film written and directed by Prabhas Nimmala. The film stars Manikanth Kota, Sunil, Ayra Bansal, Kajal Tiwari, Vikas Vasistha and others. The film is produced by Narasimha Goud and Unnam Ramesh.

The film was released on 19 December 2025.

== Plot ==
Shiva, an aspiring filmmaker, creates a demo film to establish himself in the industry. Unintentionally, the footage records vital clues connected to a drug trafficking case under police investigation. When the demo is identified as evidence, Shiva becomes a suspect despite having no involvement in the crime. The story follows his efforts to prove his innocence while continuing to chase his filmmaking ambitions.

== Cast ==
- Manikantha Kota as Shiva
- Sunil as Umesh Chandra
- Ayra Bansal as Kavya
- Kajal Tiwari as Kajal
- Vikas Vasistha as Vikram
- Madhusudhan Rao as Basha
- Laxman Meesala as Chinna
- Abhay Bethiganti as Shyam
- Posani Krishna Murali
- Surendra as a duplicate of Jr. NTR

== Music ==
The background score and songs were composed by Gowtham Raviram.

== Release and reception ==
Fighter Shiva was released on 19 December 2025.

Suhas Sistu from The Hans India rated the film 3 out of 5 and said, "Fighter Shiva is a neatly packaged crime thriller with an emotional core, offering clean, family-friendly entertainment backed by solid production values and sustained suspense throughout."

Sunil Boddula of News18 Telugu "Fighter Shiva delivers a steady flow of suspense without obscenity, offering an engaging experience for both regular and family audiences."

Ramu Chinthakindhi of Times Now gave 2.75 out of 5 stars and appreciated the Direction, screenplay, Gowtham Raviram mjusic, and the lead cast performances.

NTV (India) stated Fighter Shiva is a clean crime thriller that maintains suspense and keeps the audience engaged until the end." and Sakshi Post appreciated screenplay, execution and cast performances in their review.
