= Maruthi Nagar Subramanyam =

2024 Indian film by Lakshman Karya

- Theatrical release poster
- Directed by: Lakshman Karya
- Written by: Lakshman Karya
- Produced by: Bujji Rayudu Pentyala; Mohan Karya
- Starring: Rao Ramesh; Ankith Koyya; Indraja
- Cinematography: P. Balreddy
- Edited by: Bonthala Nageswara Reddy
- Music by: Kalyan Nayak
- Production companies: PBR Cinemas; Lokamaatre Cinematics
- Distributed by: Mythri Movie Makers
- Release date: 23 August 2024
- Running time: 147 minutes
- Country: India
- Language: Telugu
- Box office: ₹4.75 crore

Maruthi Nagar Subramanyam is a 2024 Indian Telugu-language comedy drama film written and directed by Lakshman Karya. The film features Rao Ramesh in the title role alongside Ankith Koyya and Indraja. The film was released on 23 August 2024.

== Plot ==
Subramanyam is a resident of Maruti Nagar who has been waiting for the past 20 years for a government job which has been put under hold due to some issue in the court. Instead of finding another job, his family relies on his wife's job. Due to some foreseen circumstances a total amount of 10 lakh rupees gets deposited into his account. What happens after this forms the basic premise of the movie

== Cast ==
- Rao Ramesh as Subramanyam
- Ankith Koyya as Arjun, son of Subramanyam and Kala Rani
- Indraja as Kala Rani, Subramanyam's wife
- Ramya Pasupuleti as Kanchana, Arjun’s love-interest
- Harsha Vardhan as Bhaskar, Bank Employee and Kanchana’s father
- Ajay as Bhupathi, loan shark
- Annapurna as Krishnaveni
- Praveen as Kala Rani’s cousin
- Sivannarayana Naripeddi as House Owner Parthasaradhi
- Vasu Inturi as Bank Manager
- Bindu Chandramouli as Ramya, Bhaskar’s wife and Kanchana’s mother

== Music ==
Maruthi Nagar Subramanyam

Soundtrack album by Kalyan Nayak
- Released: 2024
- Recorded: 2024
- Language: Telugu
- Label: Lidhaa Music
- Producer: Kalyan Nayak

The film's soundtrack album and background score are composed by Kalyan Nayak.

All music is composed by Kalyan Nayak.

Track list
No.	Title	Lyrics	Singer(s)	Length
1.	"Nene Subramanyam"	Bhaskarabhatla	Ram Miriyala	3:11
2.	"Madam Sir Madam Anthe"	Bhaskarabhatla	Sid Sriram	3:17
3.	"Lachhim Lachhim Devi"	Bhaskarabhatla	Mangli	2:03

== Release ==
=== Theatrical ===
Maruthi Nagar Subramanyam was released on 23 August 2024.

=== Home media ===
Digital streaming rights were acquired by Aha.

== Reception ==
Sangeetha Devi Dundoo of The Hindu praised the performances of Rao Ramesh, Ankith Koyya, Indraja and Harsha Vardhan, while stating, "Maruthi Nagar Subramanyam is a simple story that delivers some humour in its portrayal of day-to-day frictions but is also overstretched". Appreciating Lakshman Karya's writing and performances of the lead cast, BH Harsh of The New Indian Express stated that "Maruthi Nagar Subramanyam is a pure comedy, where nothing can be taken seriously—and that can only be a good thing". Deccan Chronicle too opined the same and wrote, "Maruti Nagar Subramanyam is a refreshing take on family dramas to unwind".
