= 10 TV =

10 TV may refer to:

- 10TV, an Indian news television channel
- Digi24, a Romanian news television channel
- WBNS-TV, an American television channel
- Network 10, formerly known as 10 TV Australia
