= Johaar =

2020 Indian drama film

- Film poster
- Directed by: Ravi Teja Marni
- Produced by: Bhanu Sandeep Marni
- Starring: Esther Anil; Ankith Koyya; Naina Ganguly; Eshwari Rao; Chaitanya Krishna; Subhalekha Sudhakar
- Cinematography: Jagadeesh Cheekati
- Edited by: Anwar Ali; Siddharth Thatholu
- Music by: Priyadarshan Balasubramanian
- Production company: Dharma Surya Pictures
- Distributed by: Aha
- Release date: 15 August 2020
- Running time: 122 minutes
- Country: India
- Language: Telugu

Johaar (transl. Salute) is a 2020 Indian Telugu-language anthology drama film directed by Teja Marni in his debut and starring Esther Anil, Ankith Koyya, Naina Ganguly, Easwari Rao, Chaitanya Krishna and Subhalekha Sudhakar. The film streamed on Aha on 15 August 2020.

== Plot ==
Johaar is an anthology film which revolves around 5 different stories:

Ganga, widowed woman who is saving up for her daughter's health operation, Bala, a street performer but a good athlete.

A student Jyothi who elopes with a Tea stall boy siddu because of her mother being a prostitute.

A man Bose who runs a hostel for orphans and is waiting for funds from the government. And the son of chief minister who becomes chief minister after his father's death who dreams of building his father's statue as the biggest statue in the world.Therefore, for building the statue he stops all the funds for a widowed mother whose crop is damaged by rain thus, she couldn't give money for her daughter's operation, scholarship of that girl, loan for that tea boy who aspires to start a business, funds for that athlete and funds for the hostel and finally their lives get ruined.

A journalist who narrates all this story to the chief minister claims that he is responsible for all the deaths and the chief minister with guilty opens the statue in climax.

== Cast ==
- Esther Anil as Jyothi
- Ankith Koyya as Siddhu
- Naina Ganguly as Bala, Street performer
- Eshwari Rao as Ganga
- Chaitanya Krishna as Vijay Varma
- Subhalekha Sudhakar as Bose
- Rohini
- Chalapathi Rao

== Production ==
Child artist Esther Anil made her lead Telugu debut as an adult with this film after Drushyam.

== Release ==
The Hindu wrote that "It's a commendable attempt, even though it isn't wholly convincing". The Times of India gave the film a rating of three out of five stars and wrote that "But barring minimal flaws, Teja Marni's Johaar is a raw and bold statement on the political scenario in the country today. And that makes it worth a watch!".
