= Anandalahari (TV series) =

Indian romantic drama television series

- Promotional release poster
- Genre: Romance; Drama
- Written by: Sai Vanapalli
- Directed by: Sai Vanapalli
- Starring: Abhishek Boddepalli; Bramarambika Tutika
- Music by: Joy Solomon
- Country of origin: India
- Original language: Telugu
- No. of seasons: 1
- No. of episodes: 8

Production
- Executive producers: Rakesh Patnaik; Vijay Chaganti
- Producer: Praveen Dharmapuri
- Cinematography: Ashoka Dabbeeru
- Editors: Harish Kumar Adapaka; Michael D. Selva
- Running time: 27–41 minutes
- Production company: SP Mini

Original release
- Network: Aha
- Release: 17 October 2025

Anandalahari is an Indian Telugu-language romantic drama television series created and directed by Sai Vanapalli. Produced by SP Mini, it features Abhishek Boddepalli and Bramarambika Tutika in lead roles.

It was released on 17 October 2025 on Aha.

== Cast ==
- Abhishek Boddepalli as Anand
- Bramarambika Tutika as Lahari
- Revathi Natha Pulipati as Sanyasi Naidu
- Sri Kumari as Lakshmi
- Krishna Yerubbadi as Kangaru Babai
- Amar as Flexy Raju
- Amrutha as Hebbati
- Arun Dev as Chunchu Bablu
- Kiran Areti as Panodu
- Swaraj Potluri as Bharat
- Sathyanarayana Adabala as Gajapati
- Sravani Kota as Sreya
- Anvitha Chintakayala as Mounika
- Gayatri Bhargavi as Couple Counsellor

== Episodes ==
No.	Title	Directed by	Written by	Original release date
1	"Fateful Night"	Sai Vanapalli	Sai Vanapalli	17 October 2025
2	"Eat & West Collide"	Sai Vanapalli	Sai Vanapalli	17 October 2025
3	"The Hyderabad"	Sai Vanapalli	Sai Vanapalli	17 October 2025
4	"Turning Point"	Sai Vanapalli	Sai Vanapalli	17 October 2025
5	"Understanding Each Other"	Sai Vanapalli	Sai Vanapalli	17 October 2025
6	"Together in Journey"	Sai Vanapalli	Sai Vanapalli	17 October 2025
7	"Back to Godavari"	Sai Vanapalli	Sai Vanapalli	17 October 2025
8	"The Beginning"	Sai Vanapalli	Sai Vanapalli	17 October 2025

== Music ==
All music is composed by Joy Solomon.

No.	Title	Lyrics	Singer(s)	Length
1.	"Anand's Wake Up Jam"	Joy Solomon	Joy Solomon, Sragvi, Snikitha
2.	"Attention Everybody"	Athreya Kolluru	Athreya Kolluru
3.	"Mangalam Ani"	Ashwini Chepuri	Ashwini Chepuri
4.	"Godavari Jam"	–	Joy Solomon
5.	"City Skies"	–	Ashwini Chepuri
6.	"Give Me My Money"	Joy Solomon	Joy Solomon
7.	"Radha Kadhu Ra"	Sai Vanapalli	Yashwanth Nag
8.	"Aanaadu Eenaadu"	Lakshmi Prasanna	Joy Solomon
9.	"Ayyayo Ayyo"	Lakshmi Prasanna	Lakshmi Meghana
10.	"Children's song"	Sai Vanapalli	Snikitha, Sragvi

== Reception ==
Avad Mohammad of OTTPlay rated it 2.5 out of 5 and wrote that, "Anandalahari is a series that has a simple and routine setup and takes time to grow on you, but there is nothing new that has been showcased here". Echoing the same, Suhas Sistu of The Hans India stated, "Anandalahari is a simple romantic drama that meanders through ordinary life moments without offering fresh perspectives or compelling storytelling".
