= Maalai Nera Mallipoo =

- Promotional poster
- Directed by: Sanjay Narayanan
- Produced by: Vijayalakshmi Narayanan
- Starring: Vinithra Menon; Ashwin; Dhinesh Pandiyar; Samyuktha
- Cinematography: Noydup Dorjee; Benny Richardson
- Edited by: Sanjay Narayanan
- Music by: Hrithik Shakthivel
- Production company: Every Frame Matters
- Distributed by: aha Tamil
- Release date: 9 June 2023
- Country: India
- Language: Tamil

Maalai Nera Mallipoo (transl. Evening jasmine) is a 2023 Indian Tamil-language drama film directed by Sanjay Narayanan and starring Vinithra Menon and Ashwin in the lead roles. It was released on 9 June 2023 through the streaming service aha Tamil.

== Cast ==
- Vinithra Menon as Lakshmi
- Ashwin as Karna
- Dhinesh Pandiyar as Raj Anna
- Rekha as Lakshmi's mother
- Sunanda as Malar
- Joshwanth Chris as Shankar
- Santhosh as Shankar's friend
- Mani Bharathi as Ganja Leader
- Samyuktha as Young Lakshmi

== Production ==
The film marked the directorial debut of Sanjay Narayanan, an erstwhile assistant director to Selvaraghavan. Narayanan worked on the film aged 21 and had conceptualised during the COVID-19 pandemic. Maalai Nera Mallipoo tells the tale of how the lockdown affected the livelihoods of sex workers, who were left in the lurch by a system that doesn't treat them with respect and dignity.

== Reception ==
The film was released on 9 June 2023 across Tamil Nadu. Reviewing the film, Logesh Balachandran of The Times of India wrote the film "has powerful content that deserves to be told, but the making isn't impressive enough to hold us throughout." Praveen Sudevan The Hindu wrote "filmmaker Sanjay Narayanan and actor Vinithra Menon do not attempt to merely document the life of a sex worker; they peer into the labyrinth of the lead character’s conscience".
