= Bhakthi TV =

24-hour satellite Santam Dharma devotional TV channel

- Country: India
- Broadcast area: India
- Headquarters: Hyderabad, Telangana, India

Programming
- Language: Telugu
- Picture format: 4:3 (576i, SDTV)

Ownership
- Owner: Narendra Choudary Tummala
- Sister channels: NTV; Vanitha TV

History
- Launched: 30 August 2007; 19 years ago

Links
- Website: bhakthitv.in

Bhakthi TV is the first 24-hour satellite devotional TV channel in Telugu that caters to people of Hinduism. It is one of the most prominent devotional channels of both Telugu speaking States which are Andhra Pradesh and Telangana.

Narendra Choudary Tummala launched Bhakti TV along with NTV on 30 August 2007.

It is south India's first Telugu devotional channel. Its programming includes fiction and nonfiction programs. It broadcasts daily devotional news, weekly special programs, devotional programs, and special programs relating to major festivals specific to the Telugu language-speaking community and the Indian states of Andhra Pradesh and Telangana.

Bhakthi TV focuses on devotion, spirituality, religion and moral values.
