= Unstoppable (talk show) =

Indian web talk-show

- Also known as: Unstoppable with NBK
- Genre: Talk show
- Written by: B. V. S. Ravi
- Directed by: Arun Seshkumar (2021–2022); Ashim Sen (2022–2023); Diwakaran Raghunathan (2024–present)
- Presented by: Nandamuri Balakrishna
- Music by: Mahati Swara Sagar
- Country of origin: India
- Original language: Telugu
- No. of seasons: 4
- No. of episodes: 22+1 (special episode)

Production
- Producers: Fazila Allana (2024–present); Kamna Nirula Menezes (2024–present)
- Production locations: Annapurna Studios, Hyderabad (2021–2022; 2024); Ramanaidu Studios, Hyderabad (2023)
- Cinematography: Gnanam Subramaniam (2021–2023); Diwakaran Raghunathan (2022–2023; 2024–present); Surendra Rao (2023)
- Editors: Kamalakar Gaddala ( 2022 ): Santosh Mallipeddi (2021–2022); Srishailam (2021–2022); Nagendhar (2021–2022); Surendher(2021–2023); Sai Kumar (2021–2022); Prashant Ummanthala (2022–present); Marri Shivashankar (2022–present); Saravanan (2022); Satyanarayana (2023–present); Karan Amigoo (2023–present); Surendra Gavara (2023–present); Tharapath Ganipenini (2024–present); Ambar Vyas (2024–present); Chakry (2024–present)
- Camera setup: Multi-camera
- Production company: SOL Productions

Original release
- Network: Aha
- Release: 4 November 2021 – present

Unstoppable (marketed as Unstoppable with NBK) is an Indian Telugu-language streaming television talk show hosted by actor Nandamuri Balakrishna. The show premiered on 4 November 2021 on Aha. The first season became the most-watched show on Aha, amassing over 40 crore (400 million) streaming minutes. It also became the top-rated talk show in India on IMDb. The second season premiered on 14 October 2022, followed by a limited third season, which aired on 17 October 2023. The fourth season of Unstoppable premiered on 25 October 2024.

== Production ==
In early October 2021, Nandamuri Balakrishna was approached by Aha to host a talk show, with Krish Jagarlamudi serving as the director. Filming began at Annapurna Studios, though Balakrishna was injured during the shoot. The show was formally announced in late October, with its premiere scheduled for 4 November 2021.

For the second season, Prasanth Varma was hired to shoot the promotional teasers. The season's anthem song was sung by Roll Rida and composed by Mahati Swara Sagar. The first episode of the second season, featuring N. Chandrababu Naidu was filmed on 4 October 2022. An episode featuring Pawan Kalyan was shot on 27 December 2022.

The third season's first episode was filmed in early October 2023 and premiered on 17 October 2023, while the second episode was filmed in mid-November 2023.

In early October 2024, the fourth season was announced, with an animated trailer revealing the launch date of 25 October 2024. The first episode of the fourth season, featuring N. Chandrababu Naidu, was filmed on 20 October 2024 at Annapurna Studios. Initially, the second episode was scheduled to feature the cast of Kanguva, filmed on 24 October 2024. However, it was replaced by an episode featuring the cast and crew of Lucky Baskhar, which was shot on 28 October 2024. The Kanguva episode was later aired as the third episode on 8 November 2024. The episode featuring Ram Charan and Sharwanand was shot on 31 December 2024.

== Episodes ==
=== Season 1 ===
Episode	Title	Premiere	Guest(s)
1	"Unstoppable Episode 1"	4 November 2021	Mohan Babu, Lakshmi Manchu, Vishnu Manchu
Balayya called them to increase show ratings
2	"Unstoppable Episode 2"	12 November 2021	Nani
3	"Unstoppable Episode 3"	3 December 2021	Brahmanandam and Anil Ravipudi
4	"Unstoppable Episode 4"	10 December 2021	Boyapati Srinu, Srikanth, S. Thaman, Pragya Jaiswal
Geetha Madhuri, Sri Krishna and others have performed the song "Jai Balayya" from the soundtrack album of the film Akhanda.
5	"Unstoppable Episode 5"	17 December 2021	S. S. Rajamouli, M. M. Keeravani
6	"Unstoppable Episode 6"	24 December 2021	Allu Arjun, Rashmika Mandanna, Sukumar
7	"Unstoppable Episode 7"	31 December 2021	Ravi Teja, Gopichand Malineni
8	"Unstoppable Episode 8"	7 January 2022	Rana Daggubati
9	"Unstoppable Episode 9"	14 January 2022	Vijay Devarakonda, Puri Jagannadh, Charmme Kaur
10	"Unstoppable Grand Finale"	4 February 2022	Mahesh Babu, Vamshi Paidipally

=== Season 2 ===
Episode	Title	Premiere	Guest(s)
1	"Unstoppable 2 Episode 1"	14 October 2022	N. Chandrababu Naidu, Nara Lokesh
2	"Unstoppable 2 Episode 2"	21 October 2022	Vishwak Sen, Siddhu Jonnalagadda
3	"Unstoppable 2 Episode 3"	4 November 2022	Adivi Sesh, Sharwanand
4	"Unstoppable 2 Episode 4"	25 November 2022	Kiran Kumar Reddy, Radhika Sarathkumar, K. R. Suresh Reddy
5	"Unstoppable 2 Episode 5"	2 December 2022	D. Suresh Babu, Allu Aravind, K. Raghavendra Rao
6	"Unstoppable 2 Episode 6"	23 December 2022	Jayasudha, Jaya Prada, Raashii Khanna
7	"The Bahubali Episode"	30 December 2022 (Part 1) 6 January 2023 (Part 2)	Gopichand, Prabhas
8	"Unstoppable 2 Episode 8"	13 January 2023	Honey Rose, Duniya Vijay, Gopichand Malineni, Varalaxmi Sarathkumar
9	"Power Finale – Part 1"	2 February 2023	Pawan Kalyan, Sai Tej
10	"Power Finale – Part 2"	10 February 2023	Pawan Kalyan, Sai Tej

=== Season 3 (Limited Edition) ===
Episode	Title	Premiere	Guest(s)
1	"Unstoppable Limited Edition EP 1"	17 October 2023	Anil Ravipudi, Kajal Aggarwal, Sree Leela, Arjun Rampal
To promote their film Bhagavanth Kesari.
2	"Wildest Episode"	24 November 2023	Ranbir Kapoor, Rashmika Mandanna, Sandeep Reddy Vanga
To promote their film Animal.
3	"Unstoppable Limited Edition EP 3"	22 December 2023	Suhasini Maniratnam, Harish Shankar, Shriya Saran, and Jayanth Paranjee
A lively conversation and fun with NBK and the guests.

=== Season 4 ===
Episode	Title	Premiere	Guest(s)
1	"Tirigochina Vijayam"	25 October 2024	N. Chandrababu Naidu
2	"Dil Se Dulquer"	31 October 2024	Dulquer Salmaan, Meenakshi Chaudhary, Venky Atluri, Suryadevara Naga Vamsi
3	"Singham & Samarasimham"	8 November 2024	Suriya, Bobby Deol, Siva
4	"Iddaru Firee: Part – 1"	15 November 2024	Allu Arjun, Allu Nirmala
4	"Wild Firee: Part – 2"	22 November 2024	Allu Arjun, Allu Ayaan, Allu Arha
5	"Ms. Leela & Mr. Polishetty"	6 December 2024	Sreeleela, Naveen Polishetty
6	"Sankranthi Herolu"	27 December 2024	Venkatesh, Aishwarya Rajesh, Meenakshi Chaudhary, Anil Ravipudi, D. Suresh Babu
7	"Daaku Army"	3 January 2025	Thaman S, Bobby Kolli, Suryadevara Naga Vamsi
8	"Pandugala Vacharu"	8 January 2025 (Part 1) 17 January 2025 (Part 2)	Ram Charan, Sharwanand, Dil Raju, Vikram

== Reception ==
Reviewing the first episode of second season, 123Telugu stated that "first episode of Unstoppable 2 is more serious than fun".
