= Narendra Choudary =

Indian businessman and media entrepreneur

Tummala Narendra Choudary
- Born: Tummala Narendra Choudary; 4 April 1960 (age 66); Khammam, Telangana, India
- Occupations: Businessman; media entrepreneur

Tummala Narendra Choudary is an Indian media entrepreneur and businessman who founded the Telugu news channel NTV and the first Telugu devotional channel Bhakthi TV. He also serves as the chairman of Rachana Group of Companies which has interests in publishing, infrastructure development, advertising etc.

== Early and personal life ==
Hailing from Khammam, he established Rachana Television Private Limited that owns NTV, Bhakthi TV and Vanitha TV.

He is known for organizing Koti Deepotsavam, an initiative he took up where Hindu devotees come together and light one crore oil lamps. He also initiated Mana Desam-Mana Geetham (My Nation, My Song), a campaign where 50,000 people from different places sing National Anthem together.

Government of India has nominated Narendra Choudary as Swachh Bharat ambassador in 2015.

== Business Ventures ==
He launched the 24x7 Telugu-language news channel NTV on 30 August 2007. NTV's parent company is Rachana Television Pvt. Ltd (RTPL). Rachana also owns South India's first devotional channel Bhakthi TV and India's first female-focused television channel Vanitha TV. RTPL was incorporated in 2006. As per Media Ownership Monitor, Narendra Choudary and family own 66.2% of RTPL.

Narendra Choudary and family also has interests in publishing (Rachana Publishers Private Limited), Infrastructure Development (Sri Rachana Infra Developers, and Sunshine Infraholdings), etc.

== Controversies ==
Narendra Choudary has served as the president of Jubilee Hills Housing Society president from 2006 - 2021.

In the society elections held on March 21, 2021, Narendra Choudary didn’t contest and the new society formed their panel on March 23, 2021. The new society filed a case against Choudary in the High Court on April 20, 2021.

However, the Telangana High Court directed the Hyderabad city police not to arrest Narendra Choudary in the case pertaining to alleged scam in Jubilee Hills Cooperative House Building Society (JHCHBS). And the Jubilee hills police have withdrawn the case as there is no conspiracy and nothing illegal in the plot registration process. Despite the contradictions over the years, In the September 3, 2021 elections for the Jubilee Hills International Center governing body Narendra Chaudhary panel was elected unanimously.

== Awards ==
He received lifetime achievement award by Telugu Association of North America in 2019.
