= Papam Pasivadu (TV series) =

Indian Romantic drama series

- Promotional poster
- Genre: Romance drama
- Created by: Lalith Kumar
- Written by: Lalith Kumar
- Directed by: Lalith Kumar
- Starring: Sreerama Chandra; Rashi Singh; Srividya Maharshi; Gayatri Changanti; Ashok Kumar
- Music by: Jose Jimmy
- Country of origin: India
- Original language: Telugu
- No. of seasons: 1
- No. of episodes: 5

Production
- Executive producers: Bhuvan Saluru; Arjun Samudrala
- Producer: Akhilesh Vardhan
- Cinematography: Gokul Bharathi
- Editor: Viplav Nyshadam
- Camera setup: Multi-camera
- Production company: The Weekend Show

Original release
- Network: Aha
- Release: 29 September 2023

Papam Pasivadu is an Indian Telugu-language romance drama television series created by Lalith Kumar and written and directed by him. The series was produced by Akhlilesh Vardhan under the banner The Weekend Show. It stars Sreerama Chandra, Rashi Singh, Srividya Maharshi, Gayatri Changanti and Ashok Kumar. It premiered on Aha on 29 September 2023. It received negative reviews from critics.

== Plot ==
Kranthi, portrayed by Sreerama Chandra, is a 32-year-old man facing confusion after his breakup with Dimpy, played by Gayathri Changanti. One night, while dealing with his emotions and under the influence, he meets Chaaru (Raashi Singh) at a bar. This encounter leads him to stay at Chaaru's place, sparking a new interest. Meanwhile, Kranthi's parents arrange a marriage with Anusha (Sri Vidya Maharshi).

Caught in conflicting emotions, Kranthi is torn between choosing Chaaru, fulfilling his parents' wishes with Anusha, or reconciling with Dimpy. The series follows Kranthi as he navigates his emotions and relationships, exploring the consequences of his decisions. The narrative unfolds to reveal subsequent events, providing an exploration of love, choices, and the repercussions within Kranthi's personal journey.

== Cast ==
- Sreerama Chandra as Kranthi
- Rashi Singh as Chaaru
- Gayathri Changanti as Dimpy
- Srividya Maharshi as Anusha
- Ashok Kumar as Vardhan
- Madee as Nithin

== Episodes ==
=== Series overview ===
Series	Episodes	Originally released
1	5	29 September 2023

=== Season 1 (2023) ===
No. overall	No. in season	Title	Directed by	Written by	Original release date
1	1	"Antham"	Lalith Kumar	Lalith Kumar	29 September 2023
2	2	"Veta"	Lalith Kumar	Lalith Kumar	29 September 2023
3	3	"Aha naa Pellanta"	Lalith Kumar	Lalith Kumar	29 September 2023
4	4	"Kshana Kshanam"	Lalith Kumar	Lalith Kumar	29 September 2023
5	5	"Nirnayam"	Lalith Kumar	Lalith Kumar	29 September 2023

== Reception ==
A critic from 123telugu gave the series 2.25/5 stars and wrote that "Papam Pasivadu, a coming-of-age web series, falls short of leaving a lasting impression despite Sreerama Chandra's commendable performance. The simple storyline, coupled with occasional moments of laughter, suggests exploring alternative entertainment options for a more engaging weekend."

Nelki Naresh Kumar of Hindustan Times stated that "Papam Pasivadu is a light-hearted entertainment series. While it may lack originality in terms of its storyline and plots, it still offers a pleasant viewing experience that can be enjoyed for entertainment purposes. It's worth considering for a leisurely watch, despite the absence of groundbreaking narratives."

A critic from Eenadu wrote that "Lalit Kumar's adept use of humor breathes life into the familiar tale, keeping the audience engaged even during moments of the hero's perplexity. The narrative skillfully balances confusion with clarity, delivering a commentary that ensures both amusement and comprehension."

Srivathsan Nadadhur of OTTPlay gave the series 1/5 stars and wrote that "Papam Pasivadu falls flat as a comedy, relying on weak jokes and scenes for laughs. Sreerama Chandra's disappointing acting makes it a weekend watch to skip."

A critic from Cinejosh gave the series 1.5/5 stars and stated that "Lalith Kumar effectively depicts Sreerama Chandra as a modern youth in 'Papam Pasivadu,' but the film falters due to a lackluster storyline, unengaging sequences, and a slow-paced narration, ultimately failing to deliver as a typical youthful entertainer."

Surya Prakash of Asianet News stated that "The five-episode series falls short of expectations, lacking major twists and suffering from routine elements. While Sri Rama Chandra's acting shines, attempts at showcasing the confusion in youth regarding love and marriage feel somewhat forced, and the overall screenplay could have been more carefully crafted."
