= Sugar Factory (film) =

- Directed by: Deepak Aras
- Screenplay by: Deepak Aras
- Story by: Deepak Aras
- Produced by: R. Girish
- Starring: Darling Krishna; Sonal Monteiro; Adviti Shetty; Ruhani Shetty
- Cinematography: Santhosh Rai Pathaje
- Edited by: Suresh Urs
- Music by: Kabir Rafi
- Production company: Balamani Productions
- Release date: 24 November 2023
- Running time: 2 hours 20 mins
- Country: India
- Language: Kannada
- Budget: 6 CRORES

Sugar Factory is a 2023 Indian Kannada-language romantic comedy-drama film directed by Deepak Aras and produced by R. Girish. The film stars Darling Krishna, Sonal Monteiro, Ruhani Shetty, Adhvithi Shetty and Rangayana Raghu in lead roles. Entire film Music & Background Score is composed by Kabir Rafi, while the cinematography and editing were handled by Santhosh Rai Pathaje and KM Prakash respectively.

The film's first look was revealed on 14 February 2021, coinciding the Valentine's Day and also actor Krishna's wedding day. The film was released on 24 November 2023.

== Plot ==
The story of the film revolves around the pub culture as its background. Arya (Darling Krishna) meets Adithi Bopanna (Sonal Monterio) in a pub called Sugar Factory in Goa on New Year's Eve and both believe in "no marriage, no love." They believe that single life is perfect until they propose to each other in a drunken state. After that, they cover this mistake by pretending to be in love with each other as they don't want to lose respect among friends. This leads to serious consequences. Finally, there is a big break up inside Sugar Factory in front of their friends and the pub owner.

== Cast ==
- Darling Krishna as Arya (wedding planner)
- Sonal Monteiro as Adithi Bopanna (software engineer)
- Adhvithi Shetty as Nandini (wedding Planner)
- Ruhani Shetty as Amulu (Youtuber)
- Rangayana Raghu as Bobs (pub owner)
- Shashi Kumar as Jeevan (businessman)
- Abhilash dalapathi as Abhi Bro (Arya's Friend)
- Govinde Gowda as sugar Factory waiter
- Suraj Kumar as camera men
- Mahantesh Hiremath as local Goon
- Pavan S. Narayan as Adithi's friend
- Aveeksha (Shilpa) as Arya's friend
- Neethu Rai as Adithi's Friend
- DJ Vimple as DJ Eesha

== Soundtrack ==
Kabir Rafi composed the entire original soundtrack and original background score from the film. The album has 3 peppy numbers, 3 melody & emotional songs, 1 mass number, 2 Bit songs

Track listing
No.	Title	Lyrics	Singer(s)	Length
1.	"Hangover"	Chetan Kumar	Baba Sehgal
2.	"Jahapanah"	Jayant Kaikini	Nihal Tauro, Amrita Nayak
3.	"Sugar Factory Title track"	Chandan Shetty, Ruchera	Chandan Shetty, Ruchera Vaidya
4.	"Haneya Baraha"	Raghavendra Kamath	Armaan Malik
5.	"Jahapanah Kids version"	Deepak Aras	Hamsini, Kabir Rafi, Dia, Hanya
6.	"Byadadha Bhavne"	Yograj Bhat	Vijay Prakash, Kareemullah
7.	"Kalkonda"	Arasu Anthare	Kabir Rafi
8.	"Navidarha Preeti"	Deepak aras	Pooja Rao
9.	"Kanneduralle"		Kamala Manohari
10.	"Sugar Factory theme"
