= 14 Days Girlfriend Intlo =

Indian film

- Theatrical release poster
- Directed by: Sriharsha Manne
- Written by: Sriharsha Manne
- Produced by: Satya Komal N
- Starring: Ankith Koyya; Shriya Kontham; Vennela Kishore
- Cinematography: K Soma Sekhar
- Edited by: Pradeep R Moram
- Music by: Mark K. Robin
- Production company: Satya Arts Entertainment
- Release date: 7 March 2025
- Running time: 90 minutes
- Country: India
- Language: Telugu

14 Days Girlfriend Intlo (transl. 14 days in girlfriend's house) is a 2025 Indian Telugu-language film comedy written and directed by Sriharsha Manne. The film stars Ankith Koyya, Shriya Kontham, and Vennela Kishore in lead roles.

The film was released on 7 March 2025.

== Plot ==
Harsha (Ankith Koyya) is a young man aspiring to become a filmmaker. He comes across Ahaana's (Shriya Kontham) profile on a dating app and connects with her. When Ahaana's parents leave for a wedding, she invites Harsha home. However, what was meant to be a brief visit turns into a 14-day stay.

== Cast ==
- Shriya Kontham as Ahana
- Ankith Koyya as Harsha
- Vennela Kishore as Creator Kiss
- Indraja as Harsha's mother
- Lakshmi Sujatha as Ahana's mother
- Prashant Sharma as Ahana's father
- Ashok Chandra

== Production ==
The film is produced by Satya Komal N under his Satya Arts Entertainment banner. The technical crew consists of cinematographer K Soma Sekhar, editor Pradeep R Moram, music composed by Mark K. Robin and sound mixing by P. A. Deepak.

== Soundtrack ==
The music is composed by Mark K. Robin, which includes a song which was sung by Karthik and lyrics penned by Rehman and music rights were acquired by T-Series.

All music is composed by Mark K. Robin.

No.	Title	Lyrics	Singer(s)	Length
1.	"LUV Song"	Rehman	Karthik	4:22
2.	"Locku Aiyna Raa"	Manoj Juloori	Mark K Robin	3:12
3.	"Manase"	Krishna Kanth	Kapil Kapilan, Ramya Behara	3:09

== Release ==
Theatrical

14 days Girlfriend Intlo, was initially scheduled to release on 14 February 2025 and then to 21 February 2025, and finally released theatrically on 7 March 2025.

Home media

14 days Girlfriend Intlo, was scheduled to stream on Amazon Prime Video from 4 April 2025

== Reception ==
Aditya Devulapally of Cinema Express gave a positive review stating, "14 Days Girlfriend Intlo remains content with being a breezy, light-on-its-feet entertainer" and rated it 3 out of 5. The Hans India too rated the same and wrote that, "14 Days Girlfriend Intlo is a fun-filled entertainer with good performances, witty humour, and an engaging narrative".
