= Kabir Rafi =

Indian film score composer and musician

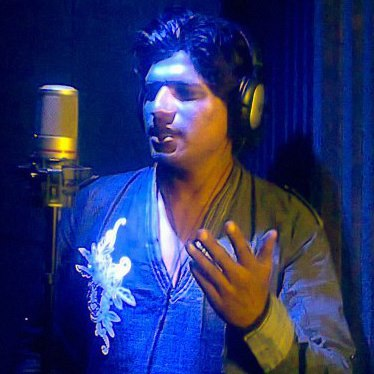

Background information
- Born: 24 June 1993 (age 33); Visakhapatnam, Andhra Pradesh, India
- Origin: Hyderabad, Telangana, India
- Genres: Film score & music producer
- Occupations: Music composer & playback singer
- Instruments: Vocalist, keyboards, guitars
- Years active: 2010–present
- Labels: Ananda Audio, T series-Lahari, Aditya Audio
- Website: www.kabirrafi.com

Kabir Rafi is an Indian music composer, playback singer, independent pop artist, and background score artist. He has produced music for more than 200 international films. Rafi made his music debut with his first multilingual feature film, titled #PK, which was dubbed in multiple languages and released in August 2022. Several of his productions have gained critical acclaim, such as Mana Mugguri Love Story and Mrs Subbalaxmi. He composed the music for his first Kannada commercial debut film Sugar Factory, released in November 2023.

Rafi's projects have featured artists such as Armaan Malik, Vijay Prakash, Baba Sehgal, Chandan Shetty, Anurag Kulkarni, Geetha Madhuri, Sri Krishna, and Anudeep Dev.

== Early life ==
Kabir Rafi was born to Shaik Abdul Khader in Vishakapatnam, India. He lived in and travelled to various cities within India, including Gujarat (Bhuj), Bengaluru, Assam (Silchar), and Mumbai, before settling in Hyderabad. His great-grandfather is a former freedom fighter, and his father and grandfather served in the Indian army; the former served as a Subedar major. Rafi is named after playback singer Mohammed Rafi, who his father had an appreciation of while in the army.

Rafi received his education from the Kendriya Vidyalaya Central School. He earned his bachelor's degree in hotel management from the Regency College of Culinary Arts in 2009, and became a Master of Business Administration (MBA) graduate at Malla Reddy College of Engineering and Technology. He worked with the Justdial Internet technology company for two years as a video vendor.

Rafi's interest in composing music began in his childhood. With his mother's encouragement, Rafi started performing at the age of 12 in various musical stage shows, learning Hindustani classical music as a vocalist and tabla player. When his father was transferred to Mumbai by the Indian military, Rafi started his musical career, mainly as a soundtrack recordist and singer for music directors such as Dilip Sen. He left Mumbai for two years, living in his uncle's home while struggling to find employment. He attempted to enter the entertainment industry by acting in small roles with Balaji Telefilms Ltd, singing several jingles for commercials and dubbing songs. In 2006, Rafi's father was transferred a second time from Mumbai to Hyderabad. He insisted that Rafi join him and focus on his studies, suggesting he further his musical career by auditioning for a position in the Telugu film industry (informally known as "Tollywood") in Hyderabad.

== Career ==
In Hyderabad, Rafi was given several jobs in the production of film soundtracks for various film and music directors. He also worked as a vocalist. The composer and singer Chakri encouraged Rafi early in his career. In 2009, Rafi collaborated with composer Jeevan Thomas for four years in music production.

From 2011 to 2015, Rafi was placed under observation, and worked as a member of the team led by music director Jeevan Thomas in the soundtrack production of the movies Kuberulu, First Love (2013) and Yavvanam Oka Fantasy (2015). He also recorded tracks in Telugu, Kannada and Hindi as a playback singer for a few movies.

Rafi gave stage performances as a singer at various events. In 2014, he completed his first film, Manasu Palike Maya Prema, and released its soundtrack. In 2016, his independent film Parinayam was released. The audio of his second feature film, Komali, was released in 2017 in Kannada. As of 2025, Rafi has completed over 200 projects, spanning short films, independent films, web series, feature films, and commercials. Several of his productions have gained critical acclaim, such as Mana Mugguri Love Story, Mrs Subbalaxmi, Konchan Istam Chaala Kastam, I Hate You, Aa Gang Repu (Part 1 and 2), Maa Naana Kosam, Pilli Kalla Papa, Oye Nandu, and Atu itu nuvvey. His most popular short films include She, Musalman, Papa, Anandmaaye, Chotu, and Karmama.

Rafi's upcoming projects include Akara and Love Again.

== Awards and nominations ==
Year	Event	Award	Work(s)	Result	Ref.
2015	Indie Fest Short Film Award	Best Background Music	Aa Gang Repu	Won	
2016	VR Films National Award	Best Music	Yedo Maya Chesav	Won	
2016	Lotus Short Film Awards	Best Song and Singer	Maa Naana Kosam, Parinayam	Nominated	
2016	Lotus Short Film Awards	Best Music	Aa Gang Repu, KICK (Koncham Istam Chaala Kastam)	Nominated	
2017	SIIMA Short Film awards	Telugu - Best Short Film Music Director	KICK (Koncham Ishtam Chala Kashtam)	Won	
2017	Lotus Short Film Awards	Best Singer	Voice of Eyes	Won	
2017	Short Film Diamond Award	Contribution of Music in the Tollywood Short Film Industry		Won	
2018	Melbourne City Independent Film Awards (MCIFA)	Best Sound Design	Insight	Won	
	Studio One Film Awards	Best Music Director		Won	
2018	Lotus Short Film Awards	Best Music Director	Aa Gang Repu 2	Won	
	Telangana State Language and Culture Department Short Film Festival			Nominated	

== Discography ==
=== Feature films ===
Year	Film title	Director	Lead cast	Language	Notes	Audio channel	Worked as	Genre
2014	Manasu Palike Maya Prema	Munu Swamy	Murali krishna, Kaajal Sakhare	Telugu	Audio released	Lahari Music	Music director	Love story, drama
2017	Komali	Vikas Madakari	Murali krishna, Kaajal Sakhare	Kannada	Audio released	Silly Monk	Music director	Love story, drama
2019	RAHASYAM	Sagar Sailesh	Sagar Sailesh, Rithika	Telugu	Released 1 Feb 2019	Mango Music	Music director	Horror, drama
2020	PlayBack	Hari Prasad Jakka	Dinesh, Ananya Nagmalla,	Telugu	Released 5 March 2021	AHA	Sound foley artist	Suspense thriller
2022	#pk	Hemanth p	Vinny Viyaan, Aashu Reddy	Telugu, Tamil, Hindi, Kannada, Malayalam.	Film released 26 August 2022	Lahari Music	Music director	Love story, action
2023	Sugar Factory	Deepak Aras	Darling Krishna, sonal montero	Kannada	Audio released	Ananda Audio	Music director	Rom-com drama
2024	Thata Manavudu	Ram Mandapathi	Rajendra Prasad	Telugu	Announced / filming	-----	Music director	Love & Drama
2025	Love Again (LA)	Sashank Voleti	----	Telugu	Announced	-----	Music director	Rom-com drama
2025	Akara	Raju	Sai Charan	Telugu	Confirmed	-----	Music director	Suspense thriller

=== OTT film/Web series ===
Year	Series title	Language	Director	Lead cast	Released channel	Notes	Genre
2016	Nuvvu Pakkanunte Baaguntaadhe	Telugu	Eeswar Reddy	Mohan Bhagath	Shreyas Media	2 episodes released	Rom-com
2017	Mana Mugguri love story	Telugu	Shashank Yeleti Nandini Reddy	Naveep, Tejeswini, Adith	Yup TV	All episodes released	Rom-com
2017	The Unknown	English	Siva Sai Teja	Siva Sai Teja	Disney hotstar	Released	Suspense thriller
2019	Mrs. Subbalakshmi	Telugu	N Vamsi Krishna	Lakshmi Manchu, Avasarala Srinivas	Yup TV, Zee5	All episodes released	Action-comedy-drama
2019	Missamma Pelli	Telugu	gautami challagulla	Ad My, Tarun	V6 chill	Trailer released	Rom-com
2021	Ajatha Shatruvu	Telugu	Farooq Roy	Anirudth,	East West Entertainment / MX player	All episodes released	Action drama
2025	Aa Gang Repu 3	Telugu	Yogee Qumaar	Preeti Sunder	----	Trailer released	Suspense thriller

== Singles and album songs ==
Year	Album	Song title	Language	Channel	Singer(s)	Lyricist	Notes
2015	I Hate You	Nee Kalale Kunuke	Telugu	Cinemama	Anudeep Dev, Vidya	Pavan Rachepalli	
2015	Smart Phone	Chinni Gundelo	Telugu	Kabir rafi Official	Srikant	Koushik Pegallapati	
2015	Inkonchem Premista	Kaalama Aagave	Telugu	Genuine pictures	Kabir Rafi, Apurva	Shoban NV	
2016	Maa Naana Kosam	Adugadugu	Telugu	IQlik channel	Anudeep Dev, Apurva Garimella, Kabir Rafi	Kittu Vissapragada	Nominated for Lotus Short Film Awards for Best Song, Singer & Lyric
2016	Nee Parichayam	Nee Parichayam	Telugu	Smart Creations	Kabir Rafi	Sunder	
2016	Edo Maya Chesav	Edo Maya Chesav	Telugu	U&I Entertainments	Kabir Rafi	Poorna Chaari	Won the Best Song & Singer award at VR Films national award
2016	Parinayam	Neeku Nenu	Telugu	Madhura Audio	Suresh Kumar, Harini Rao, Panchali Tanisha, Kabir Rafi	Shoban NV	Nominated at Lotus Short film Awards for Best Song, Singer & Lyric
2017	Dream of the Nation	Desh Pukare re	Hindi	Kabir Rafi Official	Kabir Rafi	Kabir Rafi	
2017	Madahosh Hui Hawa	Madahosh Hui Hawa	Hindi	DJS Film Production House	Panchali Mallik, Aradhya Sinde	Shafi	
2018	Karmama	Sirula	Telugu	Klapboard Productions	Ravi Prakash	Lakshmi Priyanka	
2018	Padipoya	Padipoya	Telugu	Telugu One	Kabir Rafi	Arhat Bodhi	
2018	Okkare Iddaru Aiyaaru	Emo Emo	Telugu	Klapboard Production	Kabir Rafi, Amrita Nayak	Shoban NV	
2018	Bonaalu Song	Dhum Dhum Dhumaar	Telugu	Genuine Pictures	Uma Neha	Veeru Gaddam	
2020	Sankuratri	Sankuratri Pandaga	Telugu	Kabir Rafi Official	Manasa Acharya, Kabir Rafi	Lakshmi Priyanka	
2022	Emo emo Manase	Emo Emo Manase	Telugu	Marina Official	Kabir Rafi	Vamsi Krishna	
2025	Software Ammai	Software Ammai	Telugu	Kabir Rafi Official	Kabir Rafi	Nikesh Kumar	
2026	Gobbiyallo	Gobbiyallo	Telugu	educoz Production kiran kumar	Kabir Rafi	Ranjith Kumar Ricky	
2026	mah-e-ramzan	mah-e-ramzan	Hindi	educoz Production kiran kumar	Kabir Rafi	Kabir Rafi	

== As playback singer ==
Year	Album	Song title	Language	Channel	Music director	Lyricist/co-singer	Notes
2015	Inkonchem Premista	Kaalama Aagave	Telugu	Genuine Pictures	Kabir Rafi	Shoban NV/Apurva	
2016	Maa Naana Kosam	Adugadugu	Telugu	IQlik Channel	Kabir Rafi	Kittu Vissapragada, Anudeep Dev, Apurva Garimella	Nominated at Lotus Short Film Awards for Best Song, Singer & Lyric
2016	Nee Parichayam	Nee Parichayam	Telugu	Smart Creations	Kabir Rafi	Sunder	
2016	Edo Maya Chesav	Edo Maya Chesav	Telugu	U&I Entertainments	Kabir Rafi	Poorna Chaari/Tanisha	Won the Best Song & Singer award at VR Films national award
2016	Parinayam	Yemautunndo	Telugu	Madhura Audio	Kabir Rafi	Shoban NV/Panchali Tanisha	
2017	Dream of the nation	Desh Pukare Re	Hindi	Kabir Rafi Official	Jeevan Thomas	Kabir Rafi	
2018	Okkare Iddaru Aiyaaru	Emo Emo	Telugu	Amrita Nayak	Kabir Rafi	Shoban NV/Amrita Nayak	
2020	#PK	Khoya Khoya	Hindi	Lehari Tseries	Kabir Rafi	Nitin/Amrita Nayak	
2023	Sugar factory	Kalkonda ee Premige	Kannada	Ananda Audio	Kabir Rafi	Arasu Anthre	
2025	Ninnu Choodaga	Ninnu Choodaga	Telugu		Ullas	--	
2026	Varshaale	Varshaale	Telugu	Kabir Rafi Official	Kabir Rafi	Kabir Rafi	

== As sound designer ==
Year	Film title	Director	Language	Notes
2015	Aa Gang Repu	Yogee Qumaar	Telugu	
2015	Shasha	Divya	English	
2016	Shiva 143	Sagar Sailesh	Telugu	
2016	SHE	Vijay Bharath	Telugu	
2017	Beep	Raj virat	Telugu	
2017	The Unknown	Siva Teja	English	
2017	Amma Ammay Prema	Farooq Roy	Telugu	
2017	Second Chance	Krishna Kumar	Telugu	
2017	Addicted	Akhil Raj	Telugu	
2017	Chotu	Raj Virat	Telugu	
2018	Mangamma Gari Manavadu	Anu Prasad	Telugu	
2018	Hamsaaro	Siva Teja	Telugu	
2018	Sleepwalker	Gopi Narra	Telugu	
2018	Okkare Iddaru Aiyaaru	Shoban NV	Telugu	
2020	From The Night U Left	Gautham Krishna	Telugu	
2020	Vizag Teeram Lo	Raj Kumar	Telugu	
