= Olu (film) =

2018 Indian film

- Film poster
- Directed by: Shaji N. Karun
- Written by: T. D. Ramakrishnan
- Produced by: A. V. Anoop
- Starring: Esther Anil; Shane Nigam; Indrans; Kani Kusruti; Maya Menon
- Cinematography: M. J. Radhakrishnan
- Edited by: A. Sreekar Prasad
- Music by: Isaac Thomas Kottukapally
- Production company: Piravi Vision
- Release dates: 21 November 2018 (IFFI); 20 September 2019
- Country: India
- Language: Malayalam

Olu (transl. She) is an Indian Malayalam-language fantasy film directed by Shaji N. Karun and written by T D Ramakrishnan. The film stars Esther Anil, Shane Nigam, Indrans, Kani Kusruti in the lead role; produced by A V Anoop. The film was the opening film at the 49th International Film Festival of India (2018). It was also screened at a few other major film festivals.

== Plot Summary ==
• The Tragic Origin: The film opens with a dark act where a group of men rape and murder a young gypsy girl, discarding her body deep into the Kerala backwaters.

• The Encounter: Vasu is a struggling painter facing a severe creative block. On a full moon night while rowing his boat, he mysteriously senses and encounters the spirit of Maya, whom people refer to as Olu (She).

Maya's influence contributes to Vasu's artistic production and subsequent professional recognition.

• Conflict and Climax: As Vasu achieves commercial success and worldly recognition, a tension develops between his artistic/spiritual purity and material greed. Their unbridgeable realms—one living in the material world above and the other bound to the mystical depths of the backwaters—lead to a tragic, bittersweet romance.

== Cast ==
- Esther Anil as Olu
- Shane Nigam as Vasu
- Samyuktha Shanmuganathan as Shwetha
- Radhika as Meenakshi
- Indrans as Abhu (Thonikkaran)
- Kani Kusruti as Manasi (Vasu's sister)
- P. Sreekumar
- Punnassery Kanchana
- Nyima Nangchung as a Buddhist girl

== Reception ==
Sajin Shrijith of The New Indian Express rated the film three out of five stars and wrote, "Though I wouldn't call it a masterpiece, I found Olu to be a much better effort than Swaham, Nishad, and Swapaanam but a couple of notches below Piravi, Vanaprastham, and Kutty Srank. It's definitely worth a watch." Deepa Antony of The Times of India gave it two-and-a-half out of five stars and wrote, "With no space for comedy or everyday references, Olu is what they call an arthouse cinema. But sadly it even as an arthouse cinema it holds back on emotions and focuses on computer generated graphics that the fantasy elements demand of it. However, Olu is watchable with the patience one reserves only for arthouse cinemas, but nothing else."

S. R. Praveen of The Hindu wrote, "the plastic, soulless conversations, and some weak writing, drags the film down. So much so that even M.J. Radhakrishnan's evocative imageries fail to save it. The moralistic stand the film leans towards also feels a bit outdated, but then that is excusable considering the place and time where the film is set." Padmakumar K of Onmanorama wrote, "Fantasies always transcend beauty and time, but at the same time if gone wrong it can go overboard. Karun, at certain areas, does seem to sweat to manoeuvrer the required connectivity between the magical and the real, especially after the movie journeys to Mumbai in the second half. Yet, the movie provides a wholesome entertainment that is aesthetically refreshing."

== Awards ==
- National Film Award for Best Cinematography - M. J. Radhakrishnan
