= Esther Anil =

Indian actress (born 2001)

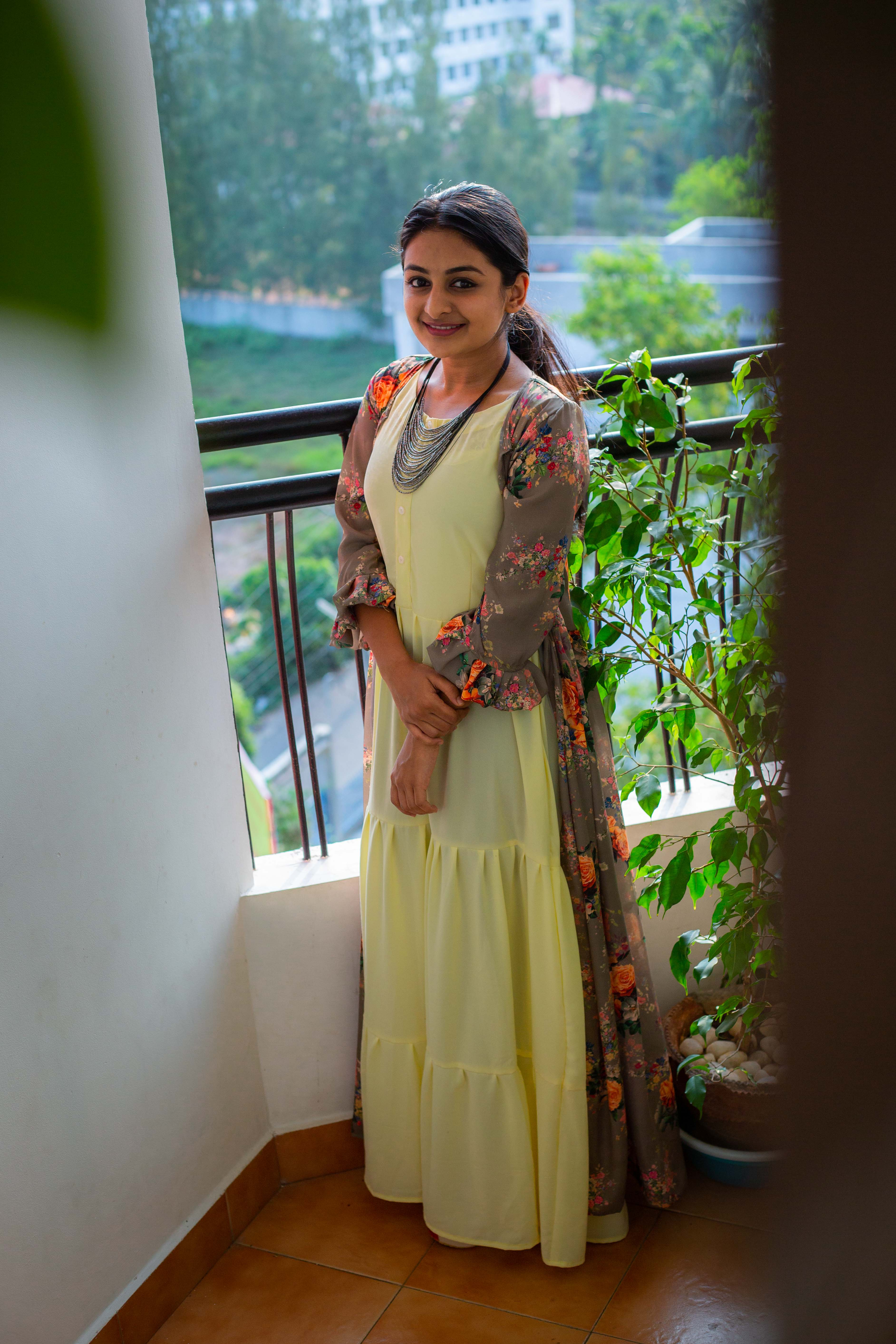
- Born: Esther Anil; 27 August 2001 (age 25); Wayanad, Kerala, India
- Occupations: Actress; TV host
- Years active: 2010 - present
- Parents: Anil Abraham; Manju Anil
- Awards: Kerala Film Critics Association Awards

Esther Anil (born 27 August 2001) is an Indian actress who works primarily in Malayalam films, in addition to few Telugu and Tamil films.

== Career ==
She debuted as a child artist in a Malayalam film Nallavan in 2010. She is best known for her role as Anumol "Anu" George in the Drishyam film series, as well as Olu in Olu (2020).

Esther has won Kerala Film Critics Association Awards for the Best Child Artist in 2016. She reprised her role from Drishyam in the Telugu and Tamil remakes, Drushyam and Papanasam (2015), respectively. She played the heroine in the unreleased Tamil film Kuzhali. She played the lead role in Johaar, a Telugu film featuring debutantes.

== Filmography ==
Key
†	Denotes films that have not yet been released

=== Film ===
Year	Title	Role	Language	Ref.
2010	Nallavan	Malli	Malayalam	Debut film
2010	Oru Naal Varum	Nandhakumar's daughter	Malayalam	
2010	Sakudumbam Shyamala	Young Shyamala	Malayalam	
2010	Cocktail	Ravi's daughter	Malayalam	
2011	Doctor Love	Young Ebin	Malayalam	
2011	The Metro	Sujathan's daughter	Malayalam	
2011	Violin	Young Angel	Malayalam	
2012	Mullassery Madhavan Kutty Nemom P. O.	Devu	Malayalam	
2012	Mallu Singh	Young Nithya	Malayalam	
2012	Njanum Ente Familiyum	Gouri	Malayalam	
2012	Bhoomiyude Avakashikal	Girl who eats at Lakshmi Amma's house	Malayalam	
2013	Kunjananthante Kada	Anu Kunjananthan	Malayalam	
2013	August Club		Malayalam	
2013	Omega.exe		Malayalam	
2013	Drishyam	Anumol "Anu" George	Malayalam	
2014	Drushyam	Anu	Telugu	
2015	Papanasam	Meena Suyambulingam	Tamil	
2015	Mayapuri 3D		Malayalam	
2017	Gemini	Gemini	Malayalam	
2019	Mr. & Ms. Rowdy	Anu	Malayalam	
2019	Oolu	Oolu	Malayalam	
2020	Johaar	Jyothi	Telugu	
2021	Drishyam 2	Anumol "Anu" George	Malayalam	
2021	Drushyam 2	Anu	Telugu	
2022	Jack N' Jill	Arathy	Malayalam	
2023	Vindhya Victim Verdict V3	Viji	Tamil	
2024	Minmini	Praveenah	Tamil	
2025	Shanthamee Rathriyil		Malayalam	
2026	Drishyam 3	Anumol "Anu" George	Malayalam	

=== Television ===
Year	Program	Role	Ref.
2018	Top Singer	Host	

== Awards ==
Year	Ceremony	Category	Film	Result	Ref.
2015	Santosham Film Awards	Best Child Actor	Drushyam	Won	
2016	Kerala Film Critics Association Awards	Best Child Artist	Papanasam	Won	
