= Nenu Super Woman =

Indian action thriller television series

- Promotional poster
- Genre: Reality television
- Starring: Sreerama Chandra
- Country of origin: India
- Original language: Telugu
- No. of seasons: 1
- No. of episodes: 6

Original release
- Network: aha
- Release: 21 July 2023

Nenu Super Woman (transl. I am a super woman) is an Indian business reality television series. The series is similar to Shark Tank and was released on 21 July 2023 on aha.

Ahead of the series' debut, it made 1.35 crore and made 1.65 crore in its second week.

== Episodes ==
No.	Title	Directed by	Written by	Original release date
1	TBA	Unknown	Unknown	21 July 2023
Angel Investors: Deepa Dodla, Sudhakar Reddy, Dr Sindhura Narayana, Sridhar Gadhi, Rohit Chennamaneni, and Renuka Bodla Contestants: Prathima Vishwanath: Ammamma's; Pavani: Vapra
2	TBA	TBD	TBD	July 2023
Angel Investors: Deepa Dodla, Sudhakar Reddy, Dr Sindhura Narayana, Sridhar Gadhi, Rohit Chennamaneni, and Renuka Bodla Contestants: Dr Neelima: CocoTang; Sridevi: Zithara
3	TBA	TBD	TBD	2023
4	TBA	TBD	TBD	2023
5	TBA	TBD	TBD	August 2023
Judges: Sudhakar Reddy, Dr Sindhura Narayana, Rohit Chennamaneni, Renuka Bodla, Karan Bajaj Contestants: Lavanya Sunkari: Laurik; Madhuri Akella: Second Innings
6	TBA	TBD	TBD	2023
