= SIIMA Short Film Awards =

Indian film awards

- Type: Award ceremony
- Awarded for: Excellence in Short Films and Music
- Sponsored by: Mulitiple
- Venue: Hyderabad, India
- Country: India
- Presented by: Vibri Media Group
- Established: 2017
- First award: 2017
- Final award: 2020
- Website: siima.in

Television/radio coverage
- Produced by: Vibri Media Group
- Related: South Indian International Movie Awards

SIIMA Short Film Awards is an award ceremony held annually to award the excellence in Short Films of four different languages – Telugu, Tamil, Kannada and Malayalam.

The ceremony was started in 2017 by Vibri Media Group.

== History ==
After successfully conducting the SIIMA for five years continuously, Vishnu Vardhan Induri who is the head of Vibri Media Group announced that they are going to start 'SIIMA Short Film Awards' to reward the aspiring and talented Short filmmakers and actors.

== Ceremonies ==
Ceremony	Date	Venue city	Ref.
First	14 May 2017 (Telugu & Kannada)	Hyderabad	
First	28 May 2017 (Tamil)	Chennai	
Second	12 August 2018 (Telugu & Kannada)	Hyderabad	
Second	25 August 2018 (Tamil & Malayalam)	Chennai	
Third	20 July 2019 (Telugu & Kannada)	Hyderabad	
Third	28 July 2019 (Tamil & Malayalam)	Chennai	
Fourth			
