= 10TV =

Telugu news channel

- Country: India
- Network: 10TV
- Headquarters: Hyderabad, India

Programming
- Language: Telugu
- Picture format: 4:3/16:9 576i, SDTV; 1080i (HDTV) (downscaled to 720p locally in some markets)

Ownership
- Owner: Spoorthi Communications Pvt. Ltd.

History
- Launched: 16 March 2013

Links
- Website: 10TV.in

10TV is an Indian Telugu-language 24-hour news channel focused on the states of Andhra Pradesh and Telangana. It was launched on 16 March 2013 with the backing of the Communist Party of India (Marxist) (CPM). The channel was funded through crowdfunding from various affiliated associations and unions of CPM. It was marketed as an independent channel with a co-operative type ownership, free from the influences of big businesses. In 2018, there was a change in the ownership of the channel. It was reportedly bought by business houses close to some politicians.

== History ==
The holding company of 10TV, Spoorthi Communications Private Limited, was incorporated in May 2012. By December 2012, it had decided to extend its reach to six districts of Orissa and five districts of Karnataka which also have a substantial Telugu population besides its primary market, Andhra Pradesh. 10TV earmarked close to ₹4 crore for marketing in the launch phase. It planned to put up 300 hoardings across Andhra Pradesh and a few in Orissa and Karnataka. Tie ups with five radio channels were also planned to increase awareness about the channel before its launch.

It was noted that the name 10TV was chosen strategically, for it to be the first channel to appear in the Telugu news genre in an alphabetical order of channel placement.

Kiran Kumar Reddy, then Chief Minister of Andhra Pradesh unveiled the logo of the channel on 14 December 2012. At the logo launch event, the managing director of the channel, K. Venugopal described it as a co-operative venture of 1.65 lakh people, with each person contributing ₹2,000–4000. The tagline of the channel is 'News is People'.

10TV was launched on 16 March 2013 in Hyderabad. It was reported that ₹30–60 crore was invested into the channel, with an operational breakeven target of two to three years. 10TV was marketed as an independent channel with a co-operative type ownership free from the influences of big businesses. K. Nageswar, a journalism professor and an independent member of the state Legislative Council known for his Marxist views, was the first chairman of the channel. Arun Sagar was its initial CEO.

The channel faced problems in managing recurring expenses for a 24-hour news channel. It also struggled to get enough advertising. In 2018, it changed hands and was bought by business houses close to some politicians.

== Ownership ==
Spoorthi Communications Private Limited is the holding company of the channel. 10TV was started with the backing of the Communist Party of India (Marxist) (CPM). Prior to its launch, the channel was claimed to be an independent entity, outside the domain of CPM . It was funded through crowdfunding from various affiliated associations and unions of CPM. CPM leader Tammineni Veerabhadram organised the funding.

As per reports, 1.65–2 lakh people invested in the channel, with each person contributing ₹500–4,000. Teachers, and banking and insurance sector employees were said to be among the most enthusiastic investors. A few hundred daily labourers and Anganwadi workers were also among the shareholders. The shareholders had elected a board of directors which, in turn, appointed a news team. The management touted this as an alternate model to the ownership of media companies by big businesses. The shareholders can also be used as citizen journalists and as marketers for the channel. Reportedly, ₹30–60 crore was invested into the channel before its launch.

Change in ownership

In August 2018, Times of India reported that there was a change in the ownership of the channel. While there were unverified reports of Jupally Rameswar Rao and Nimmagadda Prasad buying the channel, then CEO Gottipati Singa Rao denied those reports. Singa Rao claimed that he along with other investors acquired shares in the company and there were no politicians among the investors.

== Programming ==
10TV aired a programme titled 'Bakasura', where a presenter dressed in the Bakasura attire goes to places where land is being encroached by political leaders, and discusses the topic.
