= FCUK: Father Chitti Umaa Kaarthik =

2021 film by Vidyasagar Raju

- Release poster
- Directed by: Vidyasagar Raju
- Written by: Aditya
- Screenplay by: Vidyasagar Raju
- Story by: Vidyasagar Raju
- Produced by: KL Damodar Prasad
- Starring: Jagapathi Babu; Ram Karthik; Ammu Abhirami; Baby Saharshitha
- Cinematography: Shiva G
- Edited by: Kishore Maddali
- Music by: Bheems Ceciroleo
- Production company: Sri Ranjith Movies
- Release date: 12 February 2021
- Running time: 169 minutes
- Country: India
- Language: Telugu

FCUK: Father Chitti Umaa Kaarthik is a 2021 Indian Telugu-language comedy film directed by Vidyasagar Raju and produced by KL Damodar Prasad through Sri Ranjith Movies. It stars Jagapathi Babu, Ram Karthik, Ammu Abhirami, Baby Saharshitha. The music is composed by Bheems Ceciroleo. Jagapathi Babu played the lead role after a long gap.

== Cast ==
- Jagapathi Babu as Fhani Bhupal
- Ram Karthik as Karthik
- Ammu Abhirami as Umaa
- Baby Saharshitha as Chitti
- Raghu Master as Cameo
- Daggubati Raja as Raghavaiah Uma's father
- Kalyani Natarajan as Uma's mother
- Ketaki Narayan as Kalyani
- Aneri Vajani as Priyanka
- Master Bharath as Ph.D. (Pathuri Hanumantha Das)
- Shankar Melkote as Melkotaiah, Ph.D.'s grandfather
- Rajitha
- Ali
- Brahmaji as Fhani's friend
- Krishna Bhagavaan
- Sri Lakshmi as Servant Andhallu
- Jayalalita as Judge
- Ananth as Lawyer
- Vasu Inturi as Lawyer
- Jabardast Ram Prasad

== Reception ==
The film released to mixed reviews from the audience and negative reviews from critics. A critic from The Times of India opined that “Overall, despite a good story about that deals with the orthodox nature of society, FCUK fails to make a mark. Watch at your own risk!”. Telangana Today criticised the film while praising the performance of Raam Karthik. A critic from The New Indian Express wrote that “what we get on screen is just a farcical drama”.
