= 1st SIIMA Short Film Awards =

- Awarded for: Excellence in Short Films
- Date: 14 May 2017 (Telugu & Kannada) [Hyderabad]] 28 May 2017 (Tamil) [Chennai]
- Hosted by: Navdeep
- Organized by: Vibri Media Group
- Official website: SIIMA SFA 2017

The 1st SIIMA Short Film Awards were presented on 14 May 2017 at Hyderabad, Telangana and 28 May 2017 at Chennai, Tamil Nadu to honour the best achievements of the short films produced in Telugu & Kannada and Tamil languages respectively in the previous years. A total of 21 Awards were given to the talented professionals across all categories in three languages.

== Presenters ==
=== Hyderabad – Telugu & Kannada ===
- Rana Daggubati
- Shyam Prasad Reddy
- Allu Aravind
- Lakshmi Manchu
- Allu Sirish
- Navdeep
- Regina Cassandra
- Tharun Bhascker
- Pranitha Subhash
- Shraddha Srinath

=== Chennai – Tamil ===
- Rana Daggubati
- Aishwarya Rajesh
- Suhasini Maniratnam
- Nikki Galrani
- Manjima Mohan
- Ambika

== Winners and nominations ==
=== Film ===
Best Short Film
Telugu	Tamil
Vindhya Marutham; Indian, Age 25; Raagam; Why Not a Girl...!; Laddu	Mudhal Kanave
Kannada
Chowkabara; Patinga; The Last Kannadiga; Present Sir; Panmandri Cross
Best Short Film Director
Telugu	Tamil
Lakshman Krishna – Krishnamurthi Garintlo; Subhash Chandra Dheeraj Raju – Prayanam; V. Jayasankhar – Happy Ending; Sreekar – Vindhya Marutham; Srikanth Sri – Yedhane Vadili Vellipomake	Dwarakh Raja – Tanglish
Kannada
Arjun Kumar S – Panmandri Cross

=== Acting ===
Best Short Film Actor
Telugu	Tamil
Ramachandravarapu Shivakumar – Indian, Age 25; Tanneru Manoj Krishna – Krishnamurthi Garintlo; Kalidhindi Lalith – Permatho Peechumittai; Gurran Srikanth – Tholi Parichayam; Anjan Ramachandra – Emotion	Akilan – Chennaiyil Oru Mazaikalam
Kannada
Poornachandra Mysuru – Patanga; Achyuth Kumar – Chowkabara; Vasishta N. Simha – The Last Kannadiga; Tejaswi – Panmandri Cross; Arasu – Parivarthane
Best Short Film Actress
Telugu	Tamil
Darshini Sekhar – Krishnamurthi Garintlo; Meghana Lokesh – Emotion; Pavani – Vindhya Marutham; Mrudhula – Yedhane Vadili Vellipomake; Sree Yugala – Subham	Nakshathra – En Iniya Pon Nilave
Kannada
Akshatha – Panmandri Cross; Ashwini Gowda – Chowkabara; Dimpy Fadhya – Neecha; Tanuja Gowda – 23; Bhavana – Parivarthane
Best Short Film Actor in a Supporting Role
Telugu	Tamil
Ankith Koyya – Yedhane Vadili Vellipomake; Ajay Ghosh – Joke; Ravi Varma – Laddu; Darbha Appaji Ambharisha – Krishnamurthi Garintlo; Paila Ravi Siva Teja – Happy Ending	Akash – Angry Birds
Kannada
Rajkumar DM – Yaraavarivaru
Best Short Film Actress in a Supporting Role
Telugu	Kannada
Dasetty Jahnavi – Prematho Peechumittai; Prabha – Kurtha; Monica – Laddu; Nekkati Tanmai – Pilla Kalla Papa; Chebolu Amala – Janaki Kalipindi Iddarini	Brinda Devaraj – 23 Ippathmuru
Best Short Film Best Comedian
Telugu
Paila Ravi Sai Teja – Prematho Peechumittai; Sri Krishna Alias Nani – Sivoham; Mahesh Vitta – Ramudi Premalo Seetha Bhadram; Sandeep – Adhi Oka Idhi Le; Poosarla Niroop – Prematho Peechumittai

=== Music ===
Best Short Film Music Director
Telugu	Tamil
Kabir Rafi – Koncham Ishtam Chala Kashtam; Jagadeesh Satyan – Krishnamurthi Garintlo; Vamsi Krishna Keys – Lucky Love; Vamsi Krishna – Alexander; Vamsi, Hari – Vindhya Marutham	Rakesh Krishna – Sollanum Thonachu
Kannada
Raghu Dixit – The Last Kannadiga
