= Timpany School =

Mission school in Andhra Pradesh, India

- Visakhapatnam, Andhra Pradesh; India

Information
- Type: Mission school
- Motto: Seek Truth
- Religious affiliation: Baptist
- Established: 1931; 95 years ago
- Founder: A.W. Timpany
- Chairman: Aruldass Gnanamuthu
- Director: Mrs. Vandana Abraham
- Principal: Mrs. Lactita Maryann Dougherty
- Grades: Class 1 - 12
- Campus size: 1-acre (4,000 m^{2})
- Affiliation: CBSE
- Information: Houses Venus (Red), Jupiter (Blue), Neptune (Green), Mercury (Yellow)
- Website: timpanyseniorsecondaryschool.in

Timpany School is a Christian mission school in the city of Visakhapatnam, Andhra Pradesh, India. It was founded around 1872 (Timpany, Dr. Dorothy E., Love Affair with India, 1993) during the Indian pre-independence era by Dr. Rev. Americus Vespucius (A.V.) Timpany of the Canadian Baptist Mission with his objective of serving the cause of education for the glory of God. It is managed by the Evangelical Trust Association of South India (ETASI). Aruldass Gnanamuthu is the current Chairman of Timpany Schools. The medium of instruction for the school is English. They are run on Christian principles and offer students a complete education of body, mind and spirit.
