= Jupally Rameswar Rao =

Indian businessman

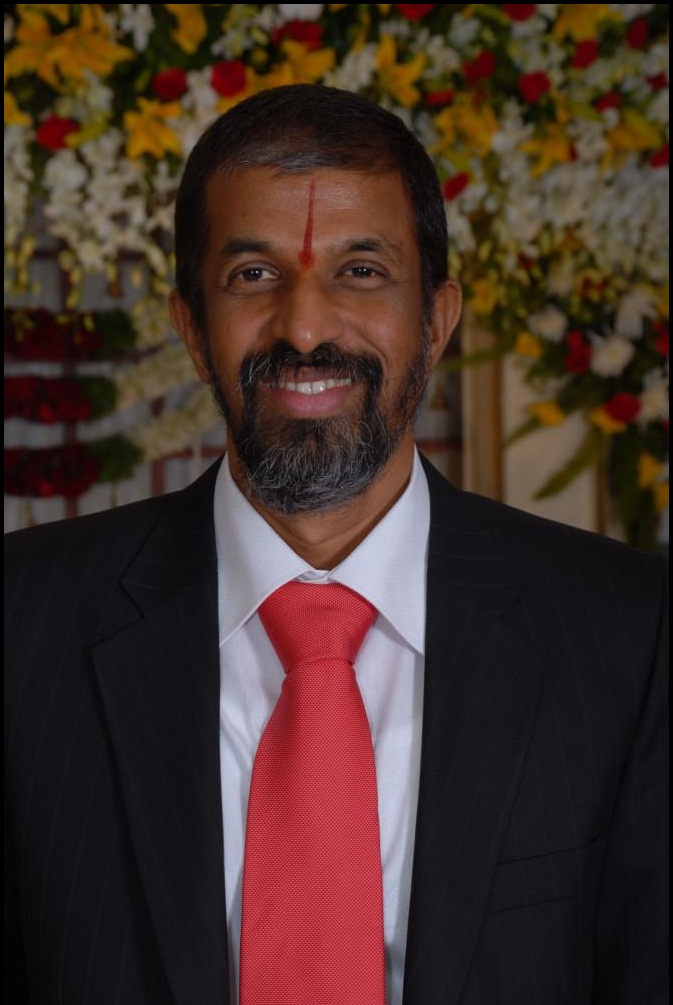
- Born: 16 September 1955 (age 71); Kudikilla, Mahbubnagar, Telangana
- Title: Founder and chairman of My Home Group; Managing director of Maha Cement; Chairman of TV9 Telugu
- Spouse: Sri Kumari
- Children: 4

Jupally Rameswar Rao (born 16 September 1955) is an Indian businessman. He is the founder-chairman of My Home Group, a Hyderabad-based company with a presence in real estate, cement, and power sectors. One of the brands of his company, Maha Cement, has a reported annual revenue of ₹3,000 crore. As per Forbes magazine, Rameswar Rao has a net worth of $3.2 billion, as of March 2024.

== Early life ==
Rameswar Rao was not born into generational wealth, and had to struggle during his childhood, often walking miles to attend his school. He wanted to become a homeopathy physician, and studied for this in Hyderabad. Through connections he made as a student leader, he opened his practice in Dilsukhnagar.

On the advice of a friend, he once invested ₹50000 to develop a plot of land and sold it three years later for ₹150000. Realising the potential of undeveloped land, he quit his homeopathy practice and ventured into real estate. He eventually founded the My Home Group, which today is one of the largest real estate companies in India

== Career ==
In 1981, he established My Home Constructions Private Limited, which had an annual revenue of ₹650 crore as of November 2016.

Rameswar Rao ventured into the cement business and started Maha Cement (My Home Industries Private Limited), which he later encashed by selling 50% to CRH plc, an Irish company, for ₹1429 crore in 2008. He bought the 3.2 million tonne cement plant Sree Jayajyothi Cements from Shriram Epc for ₹1,400 crore in 2013. Now the company has a 10-million tonne cement capacity, making Maha Cement one of the largest cement producers in South India.

Rameswar Rao had a net worth of US$2.5 billion as of March 2024, according to Forbes.

He made significant contributions to build the Statue of Equality in Shamshabad Hyderabad India, including donating the land on which it was built.

He is also the majority owner of the TV9 news network, and part owner of the NTV news network, owning about 12 percent of the channel.

== Recognition ==
In May 2017, Rameswar Rao was given the Lifetime Achievement Award by M. Venkaiah Naidu, the Union Minister of Urban Development, Housing and Urban Poverty Alleviation at the HMTV Business Excellence Awards.

Rameswar Rao's company M/s My Home Constructions Pvt. Ltd received the safety awards at the Global Safety Summit International Awards & Conference in London. He was honored for his contributions to health and safety.
