= NTV (India) =

Indian Telugu-language news channel

- Country: India
- Headquarters: Jubilee Hills, Hyderabad, Telangana, India

Programming
- Language: Telugu
- Picture format: 4:3 (576i, SDTV)

Ownership
- Parent: Rachana Television Pvt. Ltd (RTPL)
- Key people: Tummala Narendra Choudary (Chairman); Tummala Rama Devi (Managing Director)
- Sister channels: Bhakti TV; Vanitha TV

History
- Launched: 30 August 2007
- Founder: Tummala Narendra Chowdary

Links
- Website: NTVTelugu.com

NTV is an Indian Telugu-language news channel established by Tummala Narendra Choudary on 30 August 2007. The channel is named after the founder Narendra Choudary who also serves as its chairman while his wife Tummala Rama Devi is the managing director. NTV's parent company is Rachana Television Pvt. Ltd (RTPL). RTPL also owns the devotional channel Bhakthi TV and women-focused channel Vanitha TV.

As per Media Ownership Monitor 2018, Narendra Choudary and family own 66.2% of RTPL, while P. P. Reddy, the founder and chairman of Megha Engineering Infrastructure Limited (MEIL) owns 22.8% of the company, and Jupally Rameswar Rao, chairman of My Home Group owns 11%.

== History ==
NTV was launched by Tummala Narendra Choudary as a 24x7 Telugu-language news channel on 30 August 2007. The tagline of the channel is Prathi Kshaṇam Praja Hitham. The channel became popular for the accurate estimation of election results.

== Ownership ==
NTV's parent company is Rachana Television Pvt. Ltd (RTPL). Rachana also owns devotional channel Bhakthi TV and women-focused channel Vanitha TV. RTPL was incorporated in 2006. The company management (Narendra Choudary and family) also has interests in publishing (Rachana Publishers Private Limited), Infrastructure Development (Sri Rachana Infra Developers, and Sunshine Infraholdings), etc.

Megha Engineering & Infrastructure Ltd (MEIL) held 26% of the shareholding in RTPL in 2012-13 and 24% in 2013–14. The promoter, Narendra Choudary, held 69% in 2012-13 and 68% in 2013–14.

As per Media Ownership Monitor 2018, Narendra Choudary and family own 66.2% of RTPL, while P. P. Reddy, the founder and chairman of Megha Engineering Infrastructure Limited (MEIL) owns 22.8% of the company, and Jupally Rameswar Rao, chairman of My Home Group owns 11%.

== Availability ==
The channel's live video feed is also streamed on its website NTVTelugu.com and YouTube.
