= Aha (streaming service) =

Indian streaming service

- Screenshot Aha website screenshot on 8 April 2021
- Company type: Streaming media
- Website type: Video on demand; Streaming media
- Available in: Telugu; Tamil
- Founded: 8 February 2020; 6 years ago
- Headquarters: Hyderabad, Telangana, India
- Country of origin: India
- Area served: Worldwide
- Owners: Geetha Arts; My Home Group
- Founders: Allu Aravind; Jupally Rameswar Rao
- President: Allu Aravind
- Industry: Streaming; Entertainment
- Products: Streaming media
- Services: On-demand video streaming
- Parent: Arha Media and Broadcasting Pvt. Ltd.
- Website: www.aha.video
- Commercial: Yes
- Registration: Required
- Users: ▲2.5 Million (paid; as of March 2023)
- Launched: 25 March 2020; 6 years ago
- Current status: Active

Aha is an Indian over-the-top streaming service which offers Telugu and Tamil-language content. It is owned by Arha Media & Broadcasting Private Limited, a joint venture between Geetha Arts and My Home Group. The service was soft launched on 25 January 2020 and launched officially on 25 March 2020, coinciding with Ugadi, the Telugu New Year.

== History ==
Allu Aravind revealed that he was enamoured with the digital environment and developed a habit of binge-watching. Soon he came up with the idea of starting a streaming platform for hosting solely Telugu content. Discussion of the idea with his family which led to talks with Jupally Rameswar Rao, who joined as a partner in the venture. Aravind and Ramu Rao are active promoters who run the business, while Meghana Gorukanti Jupally is the head of marketing advisory committee and Ravikant Sabnavis heads the platform as CEO.

== Market and expansion ==
After opting for a soft launch on 8 February 2020 an event named aha Preview was conducted, where all the filmmakers who worked on ''aha Originals'' attended and presented their work. In November 2020, aha announced actor Allu Arjun as its brand ambassador. The platform has acquired one million subscribers within a year of its launch, and by July 2021, it has over 1.5 million paid subscribers. In November 2021, the total paid active subscribers were 1.8 million, and as of 31 March 2024, the total paid active subscribers were 2.5 million, and 40-million-plus users, catering predominantly to the markets of Andhra Pradesh and Telangana states.

In August 2021, aha launched aha kids, a sub-brand focusing on children's programming. It is scheduled to launch on 10 September, coinciding with Vinayaka Chavithi. aha 2.0 was launched in November 2021 on a cloud-native platform from Firstlight Media.

The Tamil language version of Aha was launched in February 2022.

Aha was launched for streaming on Tata Play in April 2023.

== Original programming ==
The service began its operation by acquiring digital rights of films such as Arjun Suravaram, Kaithi (Telugu dubbed version) and Choosi Choodangaane.

=== Television shows ===
The original scripted content which debuted on the service during the soft launch was Kotha Poradu, Shithappens and Geetha Subhramanyam 2020. Masti's created by Krish debuted on 8 February 2020. For the first year, the scripted original content included 25 original shows. Talk show Sam Jam with Samantha as its host premiered on aha on 13 November 2020. Aha has planned to offer over 50 original shows for the year 2021. Unstoppable with Nandamuri Balakrishna ranked 5th on IMDb among the top 10 reality shows.

Title	Premiere	Genre	Seasons	Language	Status
Geetha Subhramanyam	25 January 2020	Romantic drama	3 seasons, 23 episodes	Telugu	Ended
Kotha Poradu	25 January 2020	Romantic drama	1 season, 10 episodes	Telugu	Ended
Shit Happens	25 January 2020	Adult comedy	1 season, 5 episodes	Telugu	Ended
Masti's	8 February 2020	Drama	1 season, 8 episodes	Telugu	Ended
Sin	30 March 2020	Adult drama	1 season, 7 episodes	Telugu	Renewed
Locked	30 March 2020	Crime Thriller	1 season, 7 episodes	Telugu	Ended
Metro Kathalu	14 August 2020	Anthology drama	1 season, 4 episodes	Telugu	Ended
All Is Well	15 August 2020	Talk show	1 season, 8 episodes	Telugu	Ended
Addham	16 October 2020	Anthology drama	1 season, 3 episodes	Telugu	Ended
Tamasha with Harsha	6 November 2020	Talk show	1 season, 4 episodes	Telugu	Ended
CommitMental	13 November 2020	Romantic comedy	1 season, 5 episodes	Telugu	Ended
Sam Jam	13 November 2020	Talk show	1 season, 8 episodes	Telugu	Ended
Honeymoon	27 November 2020	Romantic comedy	1 season, 6 episodes	Telugu	Ended
11th Hour	8 April 2021	Thriller	1 season, 8 episodes	Telugu	Ended
In the Name of God	18 June 2021	Crime thriller	1 season, 7 episodes	Telugu	Ended
Kudi Yedamaithe	16 July 2021	Sci-fi thriller	1 season, 8 episodes	Telugu	Ended
Aha Bhojanambu	23 July 2021	Cooking	1 season, 8 episodes	Telugu	Ended
Tharagathi Gadhi Daati	20 August 2021	Teen drama	1 season, 5 episodes	Telugu	Ended
The Baker and The Beauty	10 September 2021	Romantic comedy-drama	1 season, 10 episodes	Telugu	Ended
Sarkaar	28 October 2021	Game show	5 seasons, 64 episodes	Telugu	Pending
Alludu Garu	29 October 2021	Comedy drama	1 season, 5 episodes	Telugu	Ended
Unstoppable	4 November 2021	Talk show	3 seasons, 30 episodes	Telugu	Ongoing
3 Roses	12 November 2021	Adult comedy drama	1 season, 8 episodes	Telugu	Renewed
Chef Mantra	17 November 2021	Cooking	6 seasons, 47 episodes	Telugu	Ongoing
Akash Vaani	11 February 2022	Romantic comedy-drama	1 season, 7 episodes	Tamil	Ended
Irai	18 February 2022	Crime thriller	1 season, 6 episodes	Tamil	Ended
Telugu Indian Idol	25 February 2022	Reality singing	4 seasons, 110 episodes	Telugu	Pending
Ramany vs Ramany 3.0	4 March 2022	Comedy drama	1 season, 12 episodes	Tamil	Ended
Qubool Hai?	11 March 2022	Social crime	1 season, 6 episodes	Telugu	Ended
Kuthukku Pathu	13 May 2022	Black comedy	1 season, 7 episodes	Tamil	Ended
BFF	20 May 2022	Adult comedy drama	1 season, 5 episodes	Telugu	Ended
Ammuchi 2	17 June 2022	Comedy	1 season, 8 episodes	Tamil	Ended
Anya's Tutorial	1 July 2022	Psychological thriller	1 season, 7 episodes	Telugu	Ended
Agent Anand Santhosh	5 August 2022	Comedy thriller	1 season, 6 episodes	Telugu	Ended
Emoji	5 August 2022	Romance	1 season, 7 episodes	Tamil	Ended
Dance Ikon	11 September 2022	Dance show	2 seasons, 37 episodes	Telugu	Renewed
Sarkaar With Jiiva	16 September 2022	Game show	1 season, 13 episodes	Tamil	Ended
Mad Company	30 September 2022	Comedy drama	1 season, 8 episodes	Tamil	Ended
Pettaikaali	21 October 2022	Action thriller	1 season, 8 episodes	Tamil	Ended
Mister Pellam	28 November 2022	Soap opera	1 season, 60 episodes	Telugu	Ended
Comedy Stock Exchange	2 December 2022	Stand-up comedy	2 seasons, 22 episodes	Telugu	Ended
Mandakini	6 March 2023	Fantasy	1 season, 64 episodes	Telugu	Ended
Newsense	12 May 2023	Political drama	1 season, 6 episodes	Telugu	Ended
Arthamainda Arun Kumar	30 June 2023	Romantic comedy-drama	2 seasons, 10 episodes	Telugu	Ended
Nenu Super Woman	21 July 2023	Reality television	1 season, 6 episodes	Telugu	Ended
Vera Maari Office	10 August 2023	Office humor	2 seasons, 105 episodes	Tamil	Pending
Family Dhamaka	8 September 2023	Game show	1 season, 15 episodes	Telugu	Ended
Papam Pasivadu	29 September 2023	Romantic comedy	1 season, 5 episodes	Telugu	Ended
Dugout	18 November 2023	Game show	1 season, 8 episodes	Telugu	Ended
Vera Maari Love Story	14 February 2024	Romantic drama	1 season, 6 episodes	Tamil	Ended
High On Kadhal	16 September 2024	Romantic drama	1 season, 4 episodes	Tamil	Ended
Sshhh	29 November 2024	Adult drama	3 seasons, 12 episodes	Tamil	Pending
Vere Level Office	12 December 2024	Office humor	2 seasons, 42 episodes	Telugu	Pending
Aha Superstar	20 December 2024	Talent show	1 season, 3 episodes	Telugu	Ended
Vera Maari Trip	10 January 2025	Comedy drama	1 season, 15 episodes	Tamil	Ended
Madurai Paiyanum Chennai Ponnum	14 February 2025	Romantic comedy	1 season, 25 episodes	Tamil	Ended
Hometown	4 April 2025	Comedy drama	1 season, 5 episodes	Telugu	Ended
Network	31 July 2025	Thriller	1 season, 10 episodes	Telugu	Ended
Anandalahari	17 October 2025	Romantic comedy	1 season, 8 episodes	Telugu	Ended
Dhoolpet Police Station	5 December 2025	Crime thriller	1 season, 50 episodes	Tamil	Ended
Pochamma	17 April 2026	Mystery thriller	1 season, 5 episodes	Telugu	Pending
Top Telugu Influencer	3 July 2026	Reality television	1 season, 8 episodes	Telugu	Pending
Aakali Rajyam	28 August 2026	Comedy drama	1 season, 6 episodes	Telugu	Ended
Awaiting release

=== Films ===
Title	Release date	Genre	Runtime	Language
Senapathi	31 December 2021	Crime thriller	144 minutes	Telugu
The American Dream	14 January 2022	Drama thriller	113 minutes	Telugu
Bhamakalapam	11 February 2022	Comedy thriller	133 minutes	Telugu
Bloody Mary	15 April 2022	Crime action thriller	91 minutes	Telugu
Payanigal Gavanikkavum	29 April 2022	Comedy drama	115 minutes	Tamil
Pothanur Thabal Nilayam	27 May 2022	Heist crime drama	123 minutes	Tamil
Highway	19 August 2022	Mystery crime thriller	123 minutes	Telugu
Rathasaatchi	9 December 2022	Action drama	123 minutes	Tamil
Sathi Gani Rendu Ekaralu	26 May 2023	Comedy drama	111 minutes	Telugu
Sevappi	12 January 2024	Crime drama	113 minutes	Tamil
Bhamakalapam 2	16 February 2024	Comedy thriller	128 minutes	Telugu
Mix Up	15 March 2024	Drama	89 minutes	Telugu
My Dear Donga	19 April 2024	Comedy drama	103 minutes	Telugu
Balu Gani Talkies	4 October 2024	Comedy thriller	122 minutes	Telugu
Alladipothunnadamma	24 October 2025	Comedy drama	26 minutes	Telugu
Chiranjeeva	7 November 2025	Fantasy comedy drama	111 minutes	Telugu
Naa Wife Missing	22 October 2026	Thriller film	99 minutes	Telugu
Awaiting release

== Exclusive distribution programming ==
These products, even though listed as Aha Originals, are programs that Aha has bought exclusive distribution rights to stream them.

=== Television shows ===
Title	Premiere	Genre	Seasons	Language	Status
No. 1 Yaari with Rana	14 March 2021	Talk show	1 season, 10 episodes	Telugu	Ended

=== Films ===
Title	Release date	Genre	Runtime	Language
Run	29 May 2020	Psychological thriller	86 minutes	Telugu
Bhanumathi & Ramakrishna	3 July 2020	Romantic drama	92 minutes	Telugu
Krishna and His Leela	4 July 2020	Romantic comedy	125 minutes	Telugu
Johaar	14 August 2020	Anthology film	122 minutes	Telugu
Buchinaidu Kandriga	21 August 2020	Period romantic drama	122 minutes	Telugu
Amaram Akhilam Prema	18 September 2020	Romantic drama	132 minutes	Telugu
Orey Bujjiga	2 October 2020	Romantic comedy	164 minutes	Telugu
Colour Photo	23 October 2020	Period romantic drama	141 minutes	Telugu
Maa Vintha Gaadha Vinuma	13 November 2020	Romantic comedy	101 minutes	Telugu
Anaganaga O Athidhi	20 November 2020	Thriller	93 minutes	Telugu
Mail	12 January 2021	Comedy	116 minutes	Telugu
Super Over	22 January 2021	Crime thriller	83 minutes	Telugu
Y	2 April 2021	Crime thriller	91 minutes	Telugu
Thank You Brother	7 May 2021	Thriller	94 minutes	Telugu
Ardha Shathabdham	11 June 2021	Social drama	115 minutes	Telugu
Sila Nerangalil Sila Manidhargal	25 February 2022	Hyperlink drama	133 minutes	Tamil
Odela Railway Station	26 August 2022	Crime thriller	91 minutes	Telugu
Maalai Nera Mallipoo	9 June 2023	Drama	119 minutes	Tamil
The Great Indian Suicide	6 October 2023	Thriller	150 minutes	Telugu
Ippadiku Kadhal	9 February 2024	Romantic drama	103 minutes	Tamil
Vidya Vasula Aham	17 May 2024	Romantic drama	103 minutes	Telugu
Dear Nanna	14 June 2024	Drama	40 minutes	Telugu
Aham Reboot	30 June 2024	Techno thriller	91 minutes	Telugu
EVOL	15 August 2024	Thriller	122 minutes	Telugu
Lineman	25 November 2024	Drama	115 minutes	Tamil
Katha Kamamishu	2 January 2025	Comedy drama	110 minutes	Telugu
Neeli Megha Shyama	9 January 2025	Romantic drama	114 minutes	Telugu
Coffee with a Killer	31 January 2025	Comedy thriller	101 minutes	Telugu
