= Gifton Elias =

Indian composer

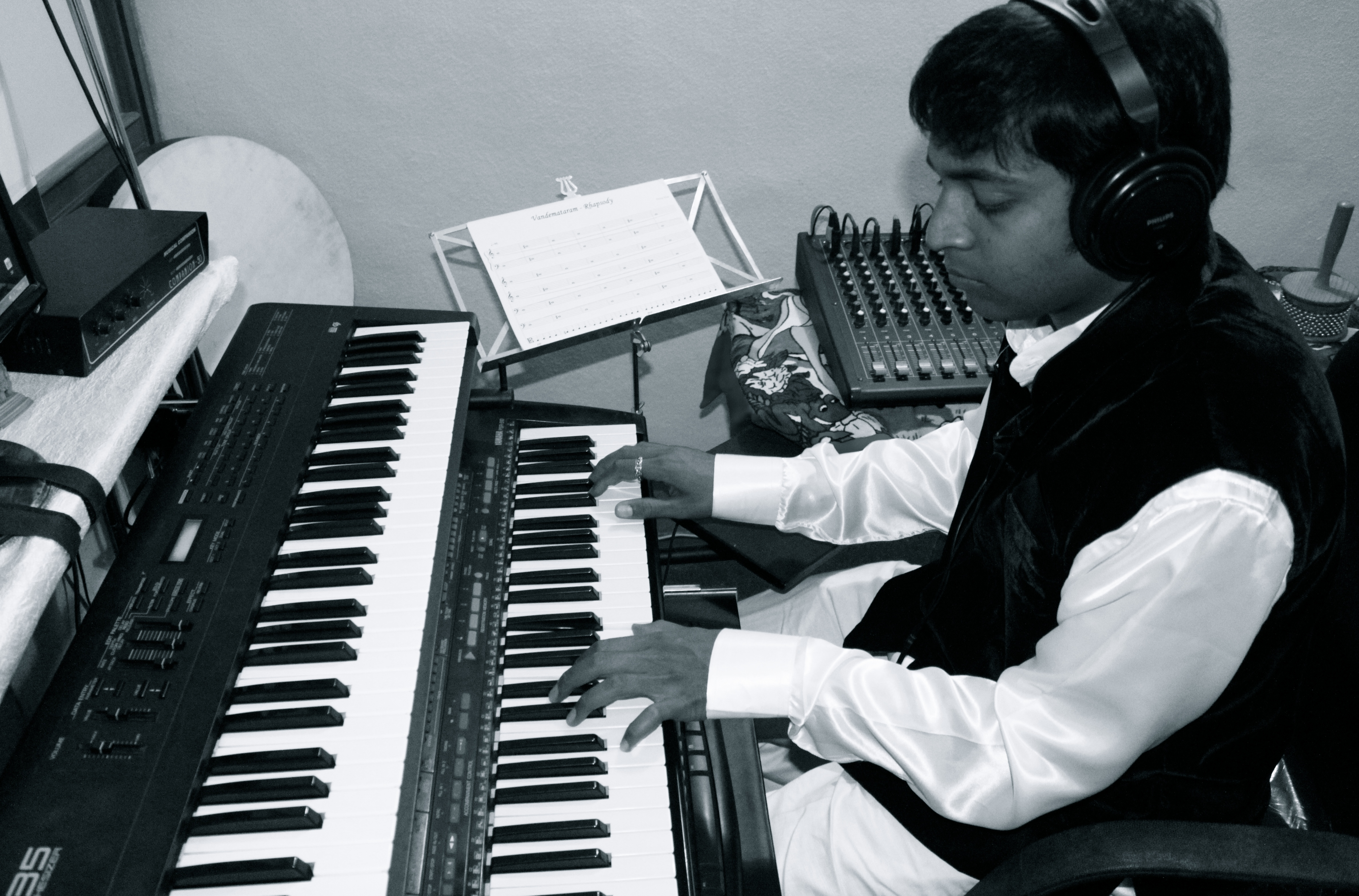
- Gifton Elias at his composing setup (2010)

Background information
- Born: Vuppula Gifton Elias; 14 February 1987 (age 39); Hyderabad, Telangana, India
- Genres: Film score, World music, Contemporary, Instrumental
- Occupations: Film composer; Music Director; Music Producer; Fiddler; Arranger; Multi-Instrumentalist; Conductor
- Instruments: Violin, Piano, Viola, Electronic keyboard, Synthesizers, Guitar, Cello, Mandolin, Percussions
- Labels: Times Music, Madhura Audio, Lahari Music
- Website: www.giftonelias.com

Gifton Elias (గిఫ్టన్ ఎలియాస్) born 14 February 1987, is an Indian composer and musician who works in Telugu-language films. He is from Hyderabad, Telangana and an alumnus of Trinity College of Music, London, United Kingdom.

He made his debut as a film composer for the 2016 Telugu film Janaki Ramudu.

== Early life ==
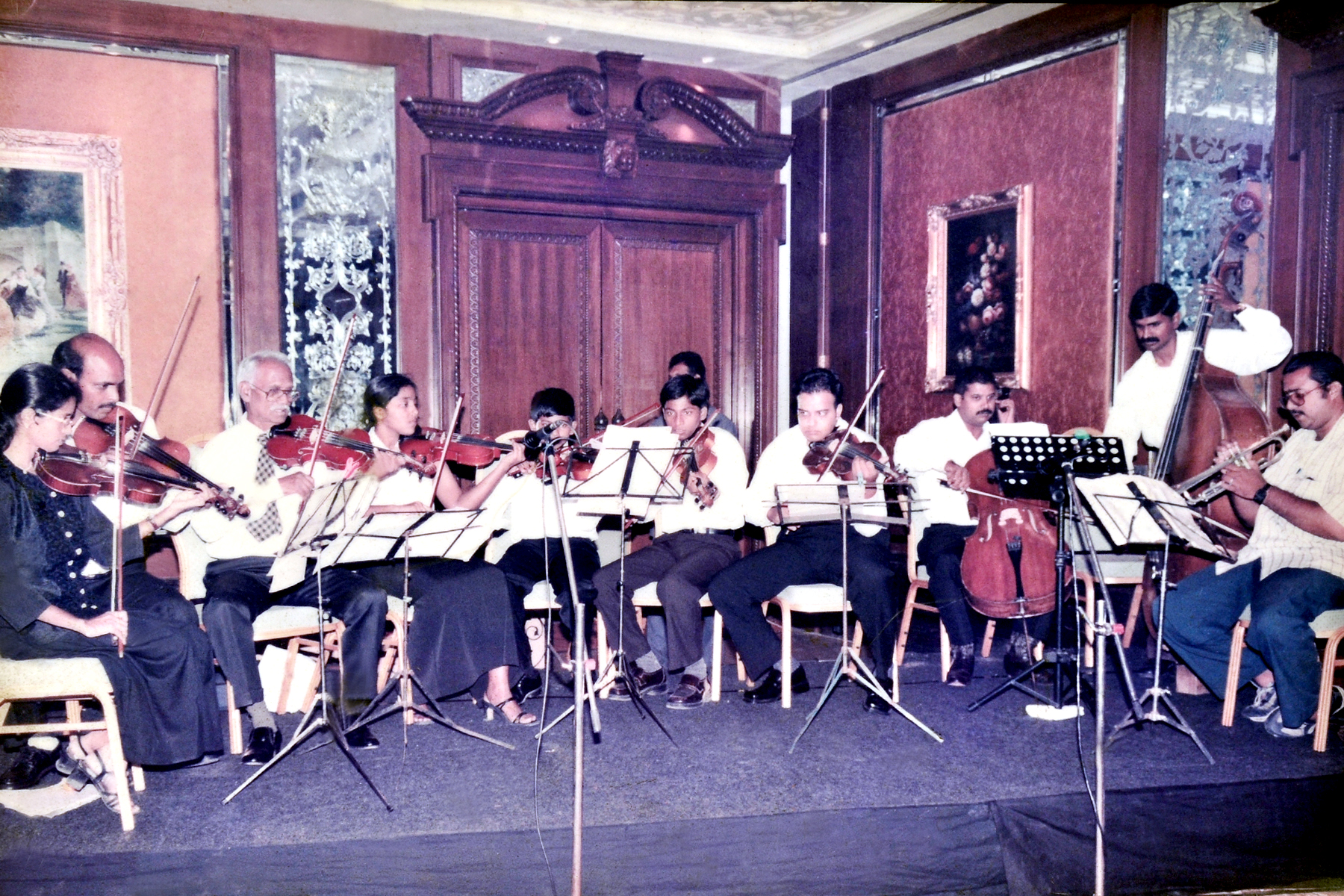
Gifton Elias accompanying on Viola for the Hyderabad Chamber Orchestra with his Violin Guru Sri. John C Marthand (2002)

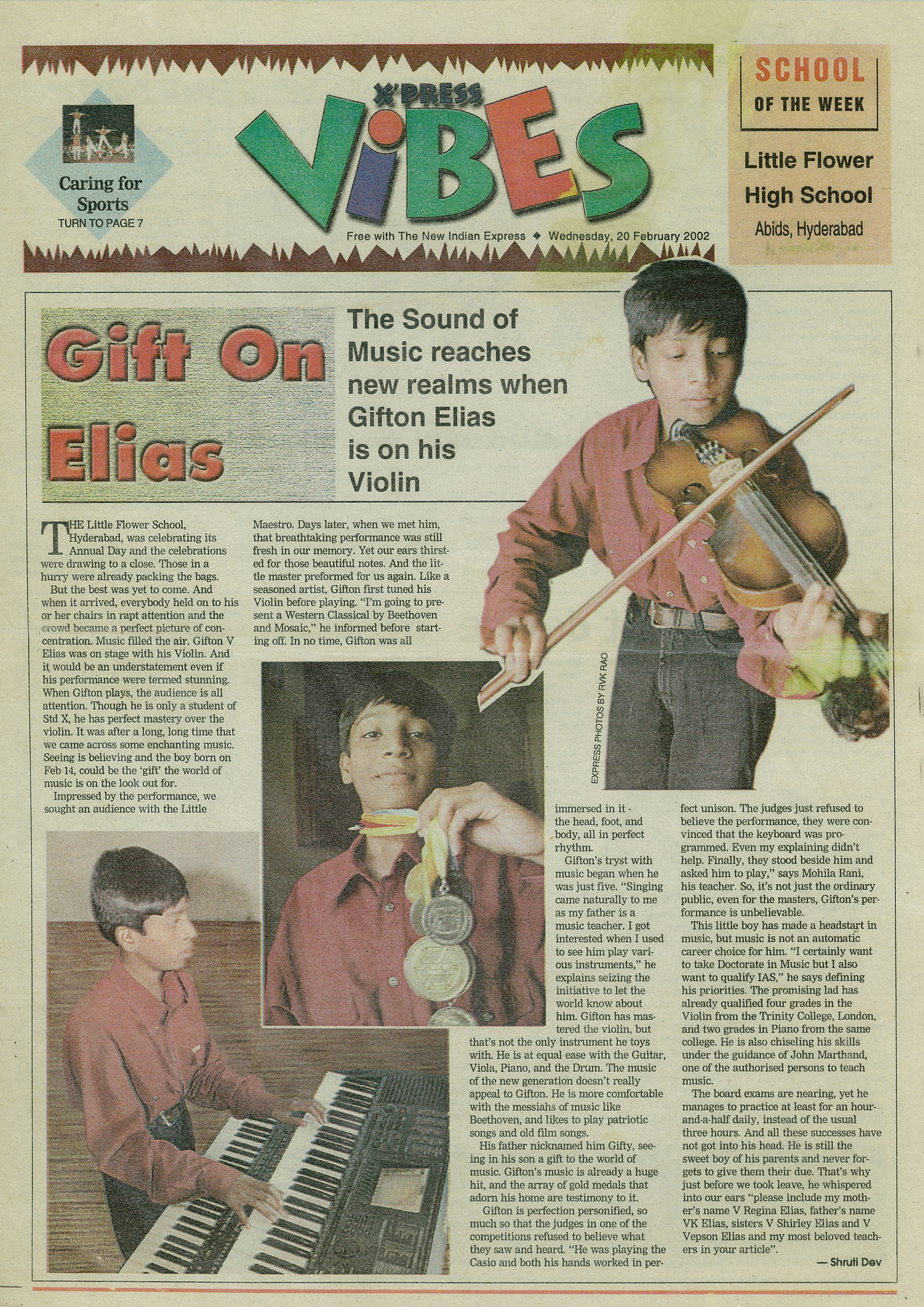
Gifton Elias - Indian Express (2002 - Hyderabad Edition)

Gifton was born and brought up in Ramnagar, Hyderabad (then united Andhra Pradesh, present-day Telangana), India, to Sri. Vuppula Krupaiah Elias (a well-known Telugu Gospel Music Director, graded artist, composer & music director at All India Radio, Doordarshan, Music Teacher, Honoured as Eminent Person in Music & Fine Arts on 21 December 2018 by the Honourable Chief Minister of Telangana Sri. K. Chandrashekar Rao) and Smt. Regina Pushpa Hatagale (Teacher).

He did his schooling at Little Flower High School, Hyderabad. He has a bachelor's degree in Mass Communication from Loyola Academy, Secunderabad and a master's degree in Visual Communication from Loyola College, Chennai.

Gifton's tryst with music began when he was just five. Gifton hails from a musically affluent family. Under the guidance of his father Sri. V. K. Elias, Gifton started singing, playing electronic keyboards, guitars at his church (Baptist Church Ramnagar, Hyderabad) and school band (Little Flower High School, Hyderabad).

After his third standard, he got into the most prestigious Trinity College of Music, London. He started learning classical piano & violin from Sri. John C Marthand. As a child prodigy, he would assist his father sometimes for recordings at All India Radio, Doordarshan & other cultural shows.

He was a part of the Hyderabad Chamber Orchestra (founded & conducted by his Violin Guru Sri. John C Marthand), Festival Choristers (a group of music lovers and senior Bureaucrats of Andhra Pradesh like Smt. Aruna Bahuguna IPS, Smt. Rachel Chatterjee IAS, and others), other Fusion bands accompanying with his violin, viola, piano & synths.

== Career ==
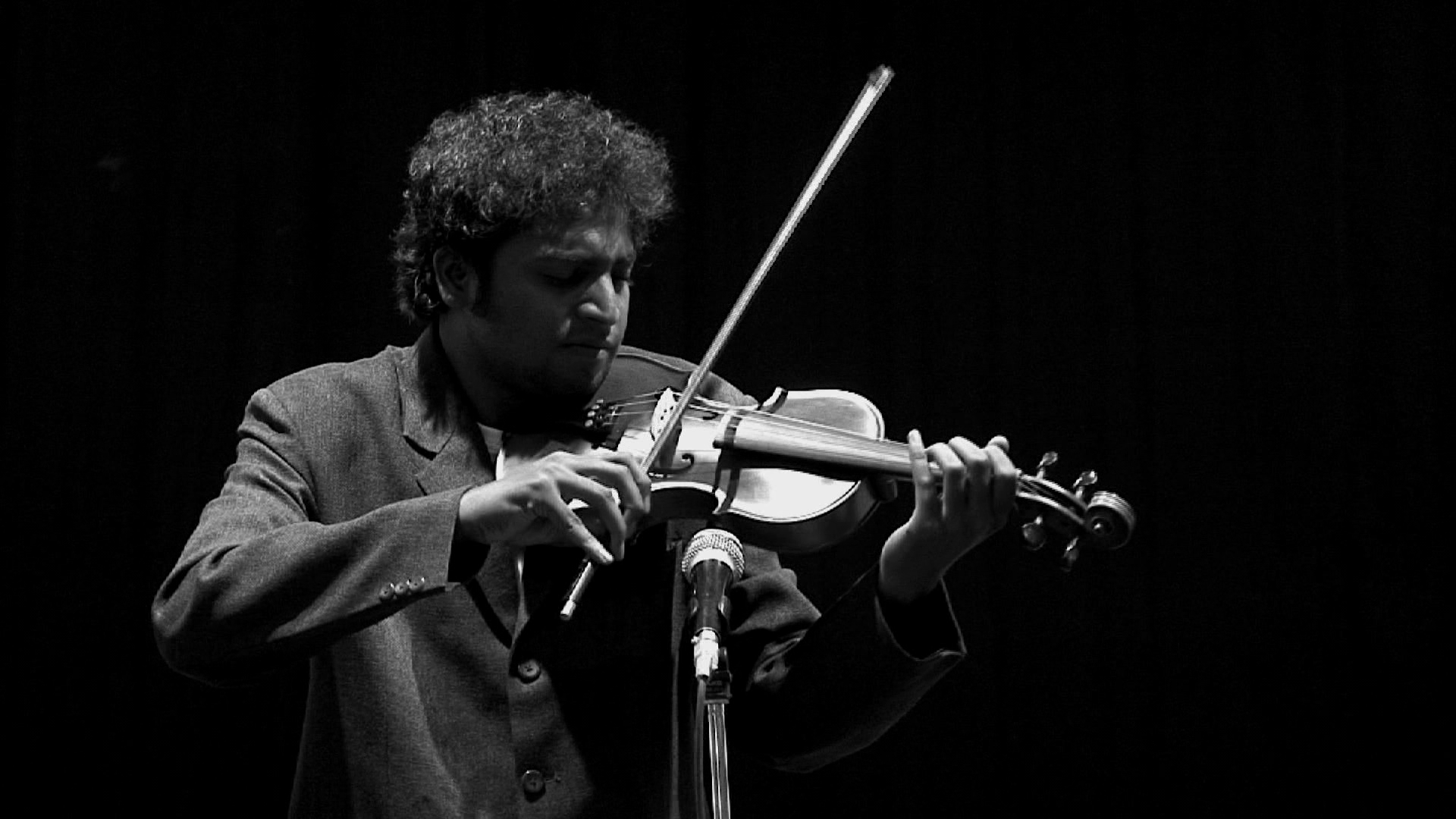
Gifton Elias live

While pursuing M.Sc Visual Communication, Loyola College, Chennai, Gifton joined as an Intern & later continued as an Assistant Director to the Ace Film maker Geetha Krishna for a few Commercials, Adfilms & Films for the then Government of Andhra Pradesh (2007–08).

In 2008, he did his first independent project as a Music Composer for the renowned South Indian Actress Jayasudha. Since then, he regards her as his "Godmother". Later, he composed music for several ads, jingles, commercials, documentaries, short films, music videos.

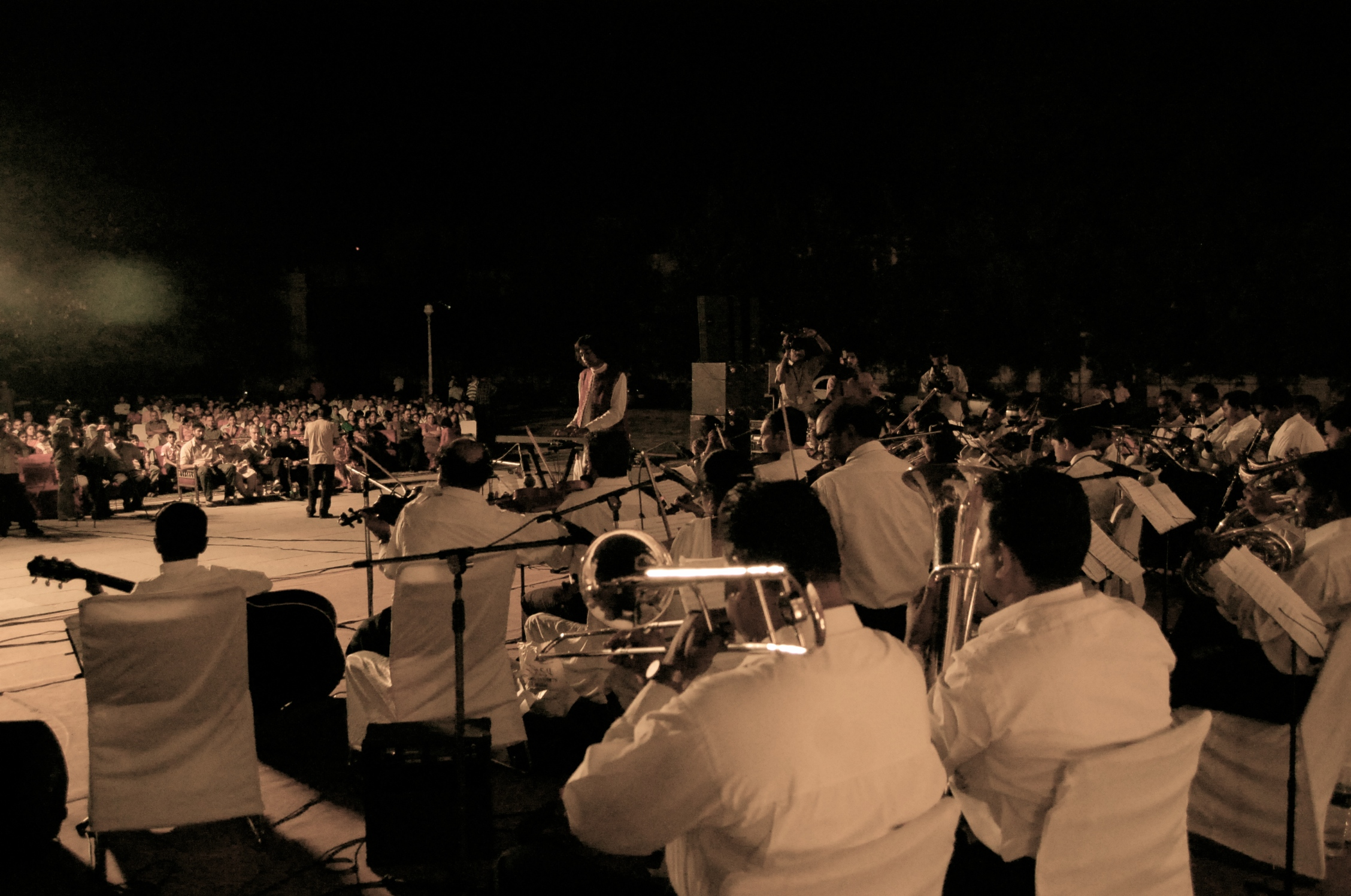
Gifton Elias with Symphony Orchestra Live for PEACE CONCERT @ Chowmahalla Palace (30.04.2010)

On 30 April 2010, at the age of 23, during the communal riots in Hyderabad, Gifton conducted a Peace Concert at the Royal Chowmahalla Palace, Hyderabad featuring a 50-member symphony orchestra live with the stage name "Gifty". The orchestra included a few students from Young Stringz School of Music (YSSM - started by Gifty in 2009), a few musicians from Andhra Pradesh Police Band & others.

The concert was graced by Smt. Jayasudha (the then MLA, Secunderabad Constituency), Sri. Noel Swaranjit Sen, IPS (Retd) other local leaders & Media.

== Discography ==
Gifton debuted as a Film Music Composer with the film Janaki Ramudu (2016 film), which released on 16 December 2016. He composed 5 songs & scored BGM for the film.

Year	Film	Music Label	Year of Release
2016	Janaki Ramudu	Junglee Music, Times Music	2016
2019	Hawaa	Madhura Audio	2019
2019	Mis(s)match	Lahari Music	2019
2023	Nachindi Girl Friendu	Tips Industries	2022
2024	Dear Nanna	Aha	2024

== Independent work ==
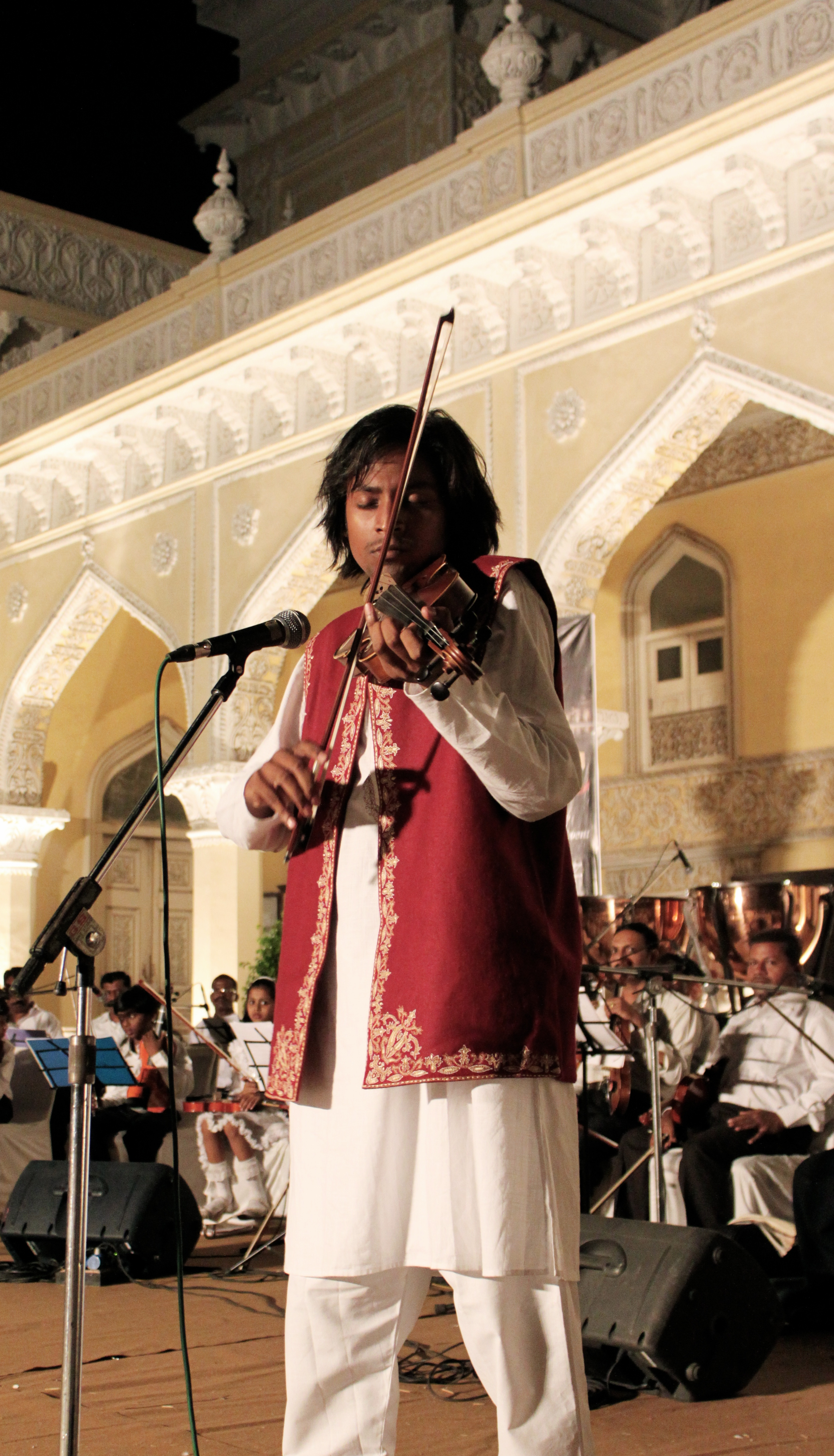
Gifton Elias Live for PEACE CONCERT @ Chowmahalla Palace (30.04.2010)

- 2007 - "Priya Raaga" (private album)
- 2011 - "The Indian National Anthem" (a video single, released by the then Honourable Home Minister of Andhra Pradesh Smt. P. Sabitha Indra Reddy
- 2012 - "Love You Maa" (Sand Art Video Single for Mother's Day) sung by Malavika Sand Art by Kanth Risa
- 2012 – "The Fiddler"
- 2013 - "Love You Maa" (Cello Cover)
- 2014 - "Vande Mataram" sung by Mohammed Irfan, Geetha Madhuri
- 2017 – "Oh My Valentine" (Single for Valentine's Day) sung by Noel Sean, Sravana Bhargavi
- 2021 - "Desi Superstar" - India's first ever Music Series celebrating 75 years of India's Independence
- 2024 - "Drug of Dance" featuring "Yashwanth Master", Produced by Sekhar
