= 2019 Hyderabad gang rape and murder =

2019 rape and murder of a woman in India

- Date: 27 November 2019
- Time: 10 PM IST (UTC+05:30)
- Location: Shamshabad, near Hyderabad, India
- Deaths: Total 5; 1 (veterinary doctor) murdered on 27 November 2019; All 4 accused, killed on 6 December 2019

2019 Hyderabad gang rape and murder of a 26-year-old veterinary doctor in Shamshabad, Hyderabad, sparked outrage across India. Her body was found in Shadnagar on 28 November 2019, the day after she was murdered. Four suspects were arrested and according to the Cyberabad Metropolitan Police, confessed to having raped and killed the doctor.

The Telangana Police stated the victim parked her scooter near a Toll plaza, catching the attention of two Truck drivers and their assistants. According to police, they deflated her tire, pretended to help her and pushed her into nearby bushes, where they raped and smothered her. Allegedly, they loaded her corpse onto a lorry and dropped it by the roadside.

The police arrested four men based on the evidence gathered from CCTV cameras and the victim's mobile phone. The accused were taken into judicial custody at Cherlapally Central Jail for seven days. The Chief Minister of Telangana ordered the formation of a fast-track court to try the accused for their alleged crimes. The rape and murder elicited outrage in several parts of the country. Protests and public demonstration against rape were organised nationwide after the incident, with the public demanding stricter laws against rape and rapists. The Minister of Home Affairs criticised the Telangana Police and stated that the government intended to amend the Indian Penal Code and Code of Criminal Procedure, 1973 to introduce laws for quicker punishment by fast-track courts.

All four accused were killed on 6 December 2019, under a bridge on the National Highway 44, while they were in police custody. According to the police, the suspects were taken to the location for a Crime reconstruction, where two of them allegedly snatched guns from the policemen escorting them and attacked the police. In the ensuing shootout, all four suspects were shot dead. Some accused the police of extrajudicial execution, while hundreds of thousands of people celebrated the men's deaths.

The first post-mortem of the four accused who were killed in the encounter was conducted on the same day at a government hospital in Mahbubnagar from where the bodies were subsequently moved to the Gandhi Medical College and Hospital. The Telangana High Court on 21 December ordered the re-postmortem of the four accused. The second autopsy was done by a team of forensic experts of AIIMS Delhi at a hospital in Hyderabad. After re-postmortem, the bodies were handed over to the next of kin after due identification process was done. In 2022, an Inquiry Commission appointed by the Supreme Court of India concluded in its report that the custodial killing had occurred in a staged encounter, and the matter was transferred to the Telangana High Court for further action. The matter is pending before Telangana High Court who were killed in encounter 4 deceased family members approach Telangana High Court for registration of crime against the police who were killed illegally without trail 2 writ petitions are pending The matter taken up by Advocate D. Suresh Kumar civil liberties leader, senior advocate, and young advocate Marati Dinesh civil liberties advocate fighting for justice behalf of the 4 deceased In this matter Supreme Court of India senior advocate Vrinda Grover argued behalf of victims registered a crime against the police, the matter is still pending.

== Background ==
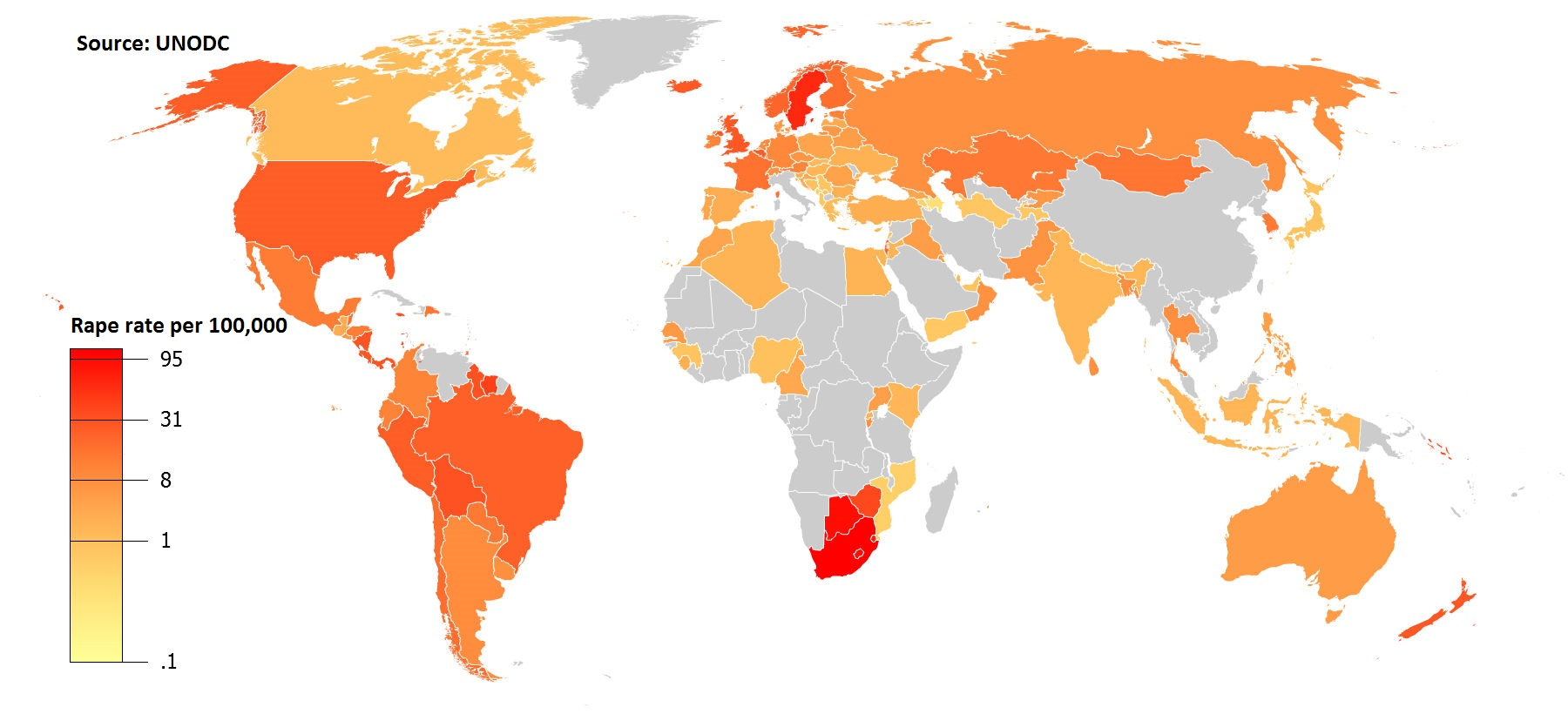
Reported Rape rates per 100,000 population 2010–2012

Rape is the fourth most common crime against women in India.

India has been characterised as one of the "countries with the lowest per capita rates of rape". Many rapes go unreported in various countries including India. The willingness to report rape has increased in recent years, after several incidents of rape received widespread media attention and triggered public protest. Most notably, the 2012 Delhi gang rape and murder led the Government of India to reform its penal code for crimes of rape and sexual assault.

== Victim ==
Disha (Name given by police to protect identity)
- Born: 1994
- Died: 27 November 2019 (aged 25–26); Shamshabad, Hyderabad, India
- Cause of death: Murder (asphyxiation)
- Body discovered: Under a bridge in Shadnagar
- Occupation: Veterinarian

The victim had pursued a degree in a veterinary college in Rajendranagar mandal. She was a resident of Shamshabad and was working as a veterinary assistant surgeon at the state-run hospital at Kollur village. As Indian laws do not permit the use of victim's real name in such cases; pseudonyms were being used by various media houses and police officials including "Disha" and "Hyderabad Nirbhaya" which was in reference to the 2012 Delhi Gang rape and murder case.

The local police convinced the victim's family to allow the use of a fictional name, Disha, in place of the victim's true name in media reporting. They also suggested using the hashtag #JusticeForDisha for social media posts instead of using the real name. Indian laws prohibit naming rape victims, and violations are subject to legal penalties. On 3 December, a man from Nizamabad district was arrested by the Cyberabad Police, after a Cybercrime case was filed against him, for posting pictures and spreading derogatory posts about the victim.

== Rape and murder ==
According to the Telangana Police remand report, the victim had parked her scooter near Tondupally toll plaza, where the accused ones saw her, two lorry drivers and their assistants, who had been drinking Whisky before allegedly planning the crime.

According to the remand report, on 27 November 2019 at around 6:15 p.m., after parking the scooter, the victim took a taxi to a dermatologist's office in Hyderabad. The suspects allegedly deflated her scooter's tire in her absence. After returning at around 9:15 p.m., she noticed the flat tyre and made a call to her sister. The accused told police they offered to help her, then ambushed her. Three of the suspects pushed her into bushes near the toll gate and turned off her phone. She continued screaming for help, so the men poured whiskey into her mouth in an attempt to silence her. The four men removed her clothes and took turns sexually assaulting her until she started bleeding and lost consciousness. When she regained consciousness, they smothered her, wrapped the corpse in a blanket, transported it in their truck 27 km to a location near the Shadnagar interchange on the Outer Ring Road, Hyderabad, and at approximately 2:30 a.m. burnt it under a bridge using diesel and petrol purchased for the purpose.

== Investigation ==
The police arrested the four accused based on the evidence gathered from CCTV cameras, an eyewitness, and the victim's mobile phone. It was reported that they were drunk during the rape and murder.

The woman's charred corpse was found under Chatanpally Bridge in Shadnagar located 30 km (19 mi) from the toll booth where she was abducted. Her scooter was found at a distance of 10 km (6.2 mi) from the place where her body was found. The police found her clothes, handbag, footwear and a liquor bottle near the toll booth. 70% of the body was covered with burns. A locket of Ganesha found on the charred corpse helped her family to identify the victim. The body was handed over to the family after a postmortem.

The executive magistrate sent the four accused into custody for 14 days to Cherlapally Central Jail. On 1 December 2019, Chief Minister of Telangana ordered that a fast-track court be formed to try the accused of this crime.

== Aftermath ==
Although the case was solved by the police in twenty-four hours, the family was dissatisfied. According to the victim's family, the response by the Hyderabad City Police was improper, claiming that a quicker response by the police could have saved the victim's life. The victim's father had approached the police at 11 p.m. on 27 November, after which the police allegedly wasted time over the applicability of the jurisdiction of the police station and inappropriate questioning of the family. Constables were only sent for a search along with the family at 3 a.m. to Tondapally toll plaza and could not find the victim.

The day after the incident the local police suspended three policemen, including a sub-inspector, belonging to the Shamshabad airport police station for negligence and the delay in registering a missing person case.

=== Second corpse ===
The half-burnt corpse of another woman was found nearby, and the case is under investigation as of 1 December 2019. The police stated that it was not clear if it was a case of Self-immolation or if she was set on fire. Police have not confirmed a link between the second corpse and the veterinarian's murder.

=== Protests ===
The rape and murder caused outrage in several parts of the country. Protests against rape were organised across the country, including major cities like New Delhi, Mumbai, and Ahmedabad. Hyderabad was the center of the protests. Politicians including Rahul Gandhi expressed shock over the incident that happened near Rajiv Gandhi International Airport. Protesters across India demanded stricter laws against rapists. After the arrest of the four suspects, a crowd of local residents gathered at the Shadnagar police station to protest against the crime and demanding that the police either hang or shoot the culprits.

Due to the crowd of protestors around the police station, the accused could not be brought to court. Instead, the executive magistrate arrived to the police station and passed the order to send the accused on judicial custody for 14 days.

While the police were transporting the accused from the Shadnagar police station to the prison in Hyderabad, several protestors threw stones over police vehicles. Police used force and wielded batons to control the crowd, who were demanding the police hand over the accused to them. The public sentiment was against the police. The protestors questioned the priorities of the police and demanded that police act in a sensitive, responsive and proactive manner.

=== Discussion in Parliament ===
On 2 December 2019, the incident was discussed in both houses of the Parliament of India, Lok Sabha and Rajya Sabha. The members of the two houses expressed outrage on the incident and demanded concrete action. In the Lok Sabha, Minister of Defence Rajnath Singh stated that the government was "open to every suggestion to curb such heinous crimes" and ready to explore strongest legal provisions. Minister of State for Home Affairs G. Kishan Reddy said, "There is zero tolerance towards crimes against women and children. Our government will soon bring requisite amendments to CrPC and IPC." He further added that the government will possibly try to bring the changes in the ongoing winter session of Parliament.

In Rajya Sabha, an adjournment motions over the incident was rejected by Chairman Venkaiah Naidu, but he allowed the members to discuss such incidents in the country. Member of Parliament Jaya Bachchan said during a heated debate that the rapists should be lynched. P. Wilson suggested courts be empowered "to surgically and chemically castrate convicted rapists before they are released from jails" to prevent repeat offenders. He stated that the list of sexual offenders should be released publicly. Vijila Sathyananth asked for faster delivery of justice and the hanging of the accused before 31 December. A speedy trial and death penalty for the accused was common demand of the members.

Mohd. Ali Khan asked for defined timelines for the trial in fast-track courts. He also asked to avoid giving a religious color to the accused since they belonged to different religions. The Communist Party of India which generally opposes capital punishment demanded it for the accused, and its member Binoy Viswam stated "I do not believe in death penalty, but these accused should be hanged for such a heinous crime".

=== Proposed legal changes ===
In an interview to NDTV while visiting the family of the victim, Union Minister of State for Home G. Kishan Reddy criticised the casual attitude of Telangana Police and their lack of a sense of urgency, saying it might have saved the victim. He stated "No one can be turned away from the police station like that. We will make it compulsory for every police station to accept a complaint. The FIR can be filed later; first they should have helped to search [for] the girl". He added "We take a very serious view of the developments. We intend to amend the IPC and CrPC to make the law such that punishment is quick through fast-track courts. We will discuss this in great detail in a meeting of DGPs (senior police officers) between December 6 and 8. We want to publicise 112 as an emergency response system. Every woman must download the app to use in emergency. At the same time, the police and law enforcement authorities, her family, even some volunteers will be alerted, so response can be quick. We have recently introduced it in Delhi and want to publicise it everywhere."

The Bureau of Police Research and Development (BPR&D) has made additional suggestions for changes to IPC and CrPC rules.

== Killing of the suspects ==
All four accused were killed in an encounter (a term used in India for killings by police), at around 3:30 am IST on 6 December 2019, under a bridge on National Highway 44 prompting accusations of extrajudicial execution. The New York Times reported that police "had been under enormous pressure to bring the rapists to justice".

According to Prakash Reddy, Deputy Commissioner of Shamshabad Police in Hyderabad, the four suspects were taken to the location for a reconstruction of the crime scene, where two of them snatched guns and attacked the police. In the ensuing shootout all four suspects were shot dead. According to reports in The Indian Express, police alleged that one of four accused had gestured to the other three to flee after attacking the police. The four tried to run towards a deserted pathway when police opened fire in what they described as self-defence. The suspects were not wearing handcuffs. According to Hyberabad police chief V. C. Sajjanar, the suspects had managed to snatch and use the weapons because the guns were unlocked. He stated "All four accused got together and started attacking the police party. Officers maintained restraint and asked them to surrender but without listening to us they kept firing. Our officers retaliated".

=== Response ===
The family of the victim welcomed the encounter. Thousands of people celebrated at the scene of the men's deaths the following day, some setting off firecrackers, distributing candies, showering police with flower petals, hoisting police to their shoulders, and shouting "hail the police!". The New York Times reported that crowds celebrating in the streets had brought traffic to a standstill. Celebrations were also reported in other areas. Politicians and celebrities thanked police for the encounter on social media. The BBC attributed the celebrations to frustration with the "meandering pace" of the judicial system in India, which often requires years and occasionally decades to adjudicate clear cases. The BBC noted the popularity of films featuring "trigger-happy, vigilante cops brazenly carrying out extrajudicial executions" and the number of tweets comparing the Cyberabad police officers with the protagonist of Singam, a 2010 film about an avenging police officer.

The families of the accused were shocked with the news and questioned the killings. Human rights organizations and activists condemned the encounter. Maneka Gandhi stated that the case should have been tried in court. Karuna Nundy expressed concerns that "now nobody will ever know if the four men killed by the police were innocent men, arrested fast to show action. And whether four of the most brutal rapists roam free, to rape and kill more women." Amnesty International India stated that the "alleged extrajudicial execution" had raised disturbing questions and asked for an independent investigation. Other human rights organizations called the encounter a distraction from the government's failures to safeguard women's rights. Meenakshi Ganguly of Human Rights Watch tweeted, "To appease public rage over state failures against sexual assault, Indian authorities commit another violation." Activist Rukmini Rao criticized some members of parliament for adding to the pressure on police, telling News Today "The police are acting on what they see as public support. And today we find not just public support, ordinary citizens, but we are finding members of parliament demanding lynchings, demanding killings, and if that is the case, how do you expect the police to act? The parliament has to uphold constitutional law." The Telangana High Court ordered to preserve the bodies of the accused until 13 December, and permitted their transfer (due to lack of morgue space) to Gandhi Hospital.

The National Human Rights Commission of India initiated an investigation of the killings and will send a team led by a senior officer to Telangana. News Today has questioned whether the encounter was staged. In May 2022, the Inquiry Commission headed by former Supreme Court judge V. S. Sirpurkar concluded in its report that the encounter was staged, and the accused "were deliberately fired upon with an intent to cause their death". The commission went on to recommend that the involved police officers be tried for murder. The Supreme Court of India transferred the matter to the Telangana High Court for further action.

== Legacy ==
In response to the incident, the Andhra Pradesh Legislative Assembly passed Andhra Pradesh Disha-Criminal Law (Andhra Pradesh Amendment) Bill, 2019 and Special Courts for Specified Offences against Women and Children) Bill, 2020. The bills seek to expedite the investigation and trail of heinous cases related to sexual offences against women and children when substantial conclusive evidence is present. As of July 2021, the bills were reserved for the President's assent.

In September 2020, filmmaker Ram Gopal Varma announced the film Disha Encounter which is based on the incident. The Central Board of Film Certification initially refused to certify the film but later passed it with an adult-only rating. The film's release has been delayed by the COVID-19 pandemic and the victim's parents approached the Telangana High Court petitioning that the film would bring disrepute to their family.

Movie DAAYRA released in 2026 starring Karrena Kappor and Prithviraj Sukumaran is based on this incident.

== See also ==
- Rape in India
- 2012 Delhi gang rape and murder
- Aasha Encounter
- 1978 Hyderabad gang rape
- 2022 Hyderabad gang rape
- 2024 Kolkata rape and murder
- Hercules (serial killer)
