= Annapurna Photo Studio =

2023 film directed by Chendu Muddu

- Directed by: Chendu Muddu
- Written by: Chendu Muddu
- Produced by: Yash Rangineni
- Starring: Chaitanya Rao Madadi; Lavannya Sahukara
- Cinematography: Pankaj Tottada
- Edited by: D. Venkata Prabhu
- Music by: Prince Henry
- Production company: Big Ben Cinemas
- Release date: 21 July 2023
- Country: India
- Language: Telugu

Annapurna Photo Studio is a 2023 Indian Telugu-language film directed by Chendu Muddu. It stars Chaitanya Rao Madadi and Lavanya Sahukara. This is their second film together after Valentines Night (2023).

The film was released theatrically on 21 July 2023.

== Premise ==
This movie tells a love story set in a rural area during the 1980s.

== Cast ==
- Chaitanya Rao Madadi as Chanti
- Lavannya Sahukara as Gauthami
- Lalith Adithya
- Viva Raghava
- Uttara Reddy
- Mihirah Gurupadappa
- Yash Rangineni
- Vasu Inturi
- Krishna Mohan
- Ramana

== Release ==
The satellite and digital rights of the film were bought by ETV Network which is to be premiered post theatrical release.

== Music ==
The music was composed by Prince Henry. The music rights of the film is owned by T-Series. The makers have released first single Rangamma sung by S. P. Charan on Apr 6, 2023. The next three lyrical videos from the film were launched by Tharun Bhascker, Suhas and Vishwak Sen respectively. Vijay Deverakonda launched the trailer of the movie, Annapurna Photo Studio

Track listing
No.	Title	Lyrics	Singer(s)	Length
1.	"Rangamma"	Srinivasa Mouli	S. P. Charan	3:37
2.	"Vennello Adapilla"	Srinivasa Mouli	S. P. Charan, Rachita Rayaprolu	4:04
3.	"Sayyata Vidhi Sayyata"	Srinivasa Mouli	Saisharan	2:41
4.	"O Muddhugumma"	Shreshta	Prince Henry, Lipsika, Ritesh G Rao	3:01
Total length:				13:23

== Reception ==
A critic from OTTplay wrote that "Annapurna Photo Studio is an entertaining thriller comedy brimming with innocence, whose smart screenplay makes up for its wafer-thin plot. It's a warm, nostalgic trip to the 80s with impressive performances, loads of humour, backed by memorable music and vibrant cinematography". A critic from 123telugu wrote that "On the whole, Annapurna Photo Studio is a romantic comedy drama that works in parts".
