= COVID-20 =

COVID-20, COVID-21 or COVID-22 may refer to:

- Coronavirus disease 2019, a contagious disease caused by SARS-CoV-2
- COVID-19 pandemic, a coronavirus pandemic that began in December 2019 and ended in May 2023
- Variants of SARS-CoV-2
  - SARS-CoV-2 Alpha variant, a variant of SARS-CoV-2 first identified in the United Kingdom in 2020
  - SARS-CoV-2 Beta variant, a variant of SARS-CoV-2 first identified in South Africa in 2020
  - SARS-CoV-2 Gamma variant, a variant of SARS-CoV-2 first identified in Brazil in 2020
  - Cluster 5, a variant of SARS-CoV-2 first identified in Denmark in 2020
  - SARS-CoV-2 Delta variant, a variant of SARS-CoV-2 first identified in India in 2021
  - SARS-CoV-2 Omicron variant, a variant of SARS-CoV-2 first identified in South Africa in 2021
- COVID-19 vaccine, The vaccines made by various companies for SARS-CoV-2
- Severe acute respiratory syndrome coronavirus 2, The virus that causes COVID-19, and is also known as SARS-CoV-2

== See also ==
- COVID-23, a fictional mutation in Songbird
- Coronavirus (disambiguation)
