= 1978 Hyderabad gang rape =

Criminal case in India

The Rameeza Bee rape case (1978) is a controversial case in Hyderabad, India. Ms. Bee claimed that she was raped by four police officers inside the Nallakunta police station, after she accused her husband of beating her. The accusations caused widespread rioting within Hyderabad. Trouble sparked off after the alleged rape of Rameeza Bee by police and the murder of her husband, Ahmed Hussain. Police opened fire at 11 places in a single day, and the old city was placed under curfew for 50 days in three bouts. From then on curfew became a regular feature in Hyderabad. After a gap of six years the city witnessed communal violence during September 1984 when the Ganesh festival was celebrated amidst a political crisis triggered by Nadendla Bhaskara Rao toppling the democratically elected N. T. Rama Rao Government. For the first time the entire twin cities of Hyderabad and Secunderabad were placed under curfew.

== See also ==
- Rape in India
- 2012 Delhi gang rape and murder
- 2019 Hyderabad gang rape and murder
- 2022 Hyderabad gang rape
- 2024 Kolkata rape and murder
