= Mayasabha (TV series) =

Indian television series by Deva Katta

- Promotional poster
- Genre: Political drama
- Created by: Deva Katta
- Screenplay by: Deva Katta; Kiran Jay Kumar
- Directed by: Deva Katta; Kiran Jay Kumar
- Starring: Aadhi Pinisetty; Chaitanya Rao Madadi; Sai Kumar; Divya Dutta; Giriyesvardan; Nassar; Tanya Ravichandran
- Music by: Shakthikanth Karthick
- Country of origin: India
- Original language: Telugu
- No. of seasons: 1
- No. of episodes: 9

Production
- Executive producers: Danish Khan; Saugata Mukherjee; Raghu Vamsi P; Sandeep Gade
- Producers: Vijay Krishna Lingamaneni; Sree Harsha
- Cinematography: Suresh Ragutu; Gnana Shekar V. S.
- Editor: Praveen K. L.
- Production companies: Hitmen & Proodos Productions LLP

Original release
- Network: SonyLIV
- Release: 7 August 2025

Mayasabha: Rise of the Titans is an Indian Telugu-language political drama television series created by Deva Katta, who co-directed the series and co-wrote its screenplay with Kiran Jay Kumar. The series is produced by Vijay Krishna Lingamaneni and Sree Harsha under the banner of Hitmen & Proodos Productions LLP. It stars Aadhi Pinisetty and Chaitanya Rao in the lead roles, co-starring Sai Kumar, Divya Dutta, and Nassar.

It premiered on SonyLIV on 7 August 2025. The story is fictionalized retelling of the events based on the politics of Andhra Pradesh that took place between the 1970s and 1995.

== Premise ==
Set in the volatile political landscape of 1970s-1990s Andhra Pradesh, the series dramatises the evolving relationship between two prominent political figures—Kakarla Krishnama Naidu and M. S. Rami Reddy—portraying their journey from friends-turned-political rivals.

== Cast ==
- Aadhi Pinisetty as Kakarla Krishnama Naidu "KKN" (based on N. Chandrababu Naidu)
- Chaitanya Rao Madadi as M. S. Rami Reddy "MSR" (based on Y. S. Rajasekhara Reddy)
- Sai Kumar as Rayapati Chakradhar Rao "RCR" (based on N. T. Rama Rao)
- Divya Dutta as Iravati Basu (based on Indira Gandhi)
- Nassar as Shivaji Rao (based on Ramoji Rao)
- Shatru as Vakada Mahesh (based on Vangaveeti Ranga)
- Ravindra Vijay as Pothineni Ramesh (based on Paritala Ravi)
- Srikanth Iyengar as Chekuri Babu Rao "CBR" (based on Nadendla Bhaskar Rao)
- Raghu Babu as P. Raja Rao (based on K. Raghavendra Rao)
- Tanya Ravichandran as Anu Harika, Naidu's Love Interest (partly based on Jayaprada)
- Bhavana Vazhapandal as Vyshnavi, Reddy's Cousin and Love Interest; Later Wife (based on Y. S. Vijayamma)
- Charitha Varma as Rameshwari, Naidu's Wife (based on Nara Bhuvaneswari)
- Jeeva as Basi Reddy
- Ravi Prakash as Valluri Chalapathi Rao "VCR" (based on Daggubati Venkateswara Rao)
- Devadarshini as Susheela Kumari (based on Lakshmi Parvathi)
- C. V. L. Narasimha Rao as Raghuram Reddy (based on N. G. Ranga)
- Rupa Lakshmi as Chitturi Rangamma
- Meka Ramakrishna as Seshayya (based on N. Kharjura Naidu)
- Sammeta Gandhi as Pothineni Veera Raghavayya (based on Paritala Sreeramulu)
- Kota Shankar Rao as Verayya Chowdary
- Goparaju Vijay as Mahinder Reddy
- Prabhavathi as Kamalamma (based on Amanamma Naidu)
- Shankar Mahanthi as Shiva Reddy (based on )
- Sunitha Manohar as Bhavani (based on Nandamuri Basavatarakam)
- Abhishek Reddy as Joseph Reddy
- Phani as Appi
- Sakul Sharma as Sandeep Basu "Sandy" (based on Sanjay Gandhi)
- Vijay Bhaskar as TNR (based on Akkineni Nageswara Rao)

== Episodes ==
Episode	Title	Directed by	Screenplay by	Date of Broadcast
1	"The Story Of India Is The Story Of Caste"	Deva Katta & Kiran Jay Kumar	Deva Katta & Kiran Jay Kumar	August 7, 2025
In Mid 90s, All the 160 MLAs belonging to RCR party, his two sons, his two son in laws namely Valluri Chalapathi Rao(first son-in-law) and Krishnam Naidu (second son-in-law) are asked to summon at Ashrama Hotel. They have declared a non co-operation movement against the CM RCR due to increasing influence of Susheela Kumari in the party affairs. They provide an ultimatum that if they have to continue in the party, Susheela kumari should be kept away from party affairs.Because of this the ongoing internal conflict between Susheela Kumari and Krishnam Naidu has come to light.At that time, Krishnam Naidu makes a phone to Rami Reddy(His past friend, but now a political rivalry) on what to do in this situation, for Rami Reddy tells him whether both Krishnam Naidu or RCR wins, the next is they have to face him politically. Then the story shifts to 1970s.
2	"Natural Born Leaders"	Deva Katta & Kiran Jay Kumar	Deva Katta & Kiran Jay Kumar	August 7, 2025
3	"A 'Hi' Amidst Chaos"	Deva Katta & Kiran Jay Kumar	Deva Katta & Kiran Jay Kumar	August 7, 2025
4	"Rebels With A Cause"	Deva Katta & Kiran Jay Kumar	Deva Katta & Kiran Jay Kumar	August 7, 2025
5	"Ticket To Mayasabha"	Deva Katta & Kiran Jay Kumar	Deva Katta & Kiran Jay Kumar	August 7, 2025
6	"Train To Mayasabha"	Deva Katta & Kiran Jay Kumar	Deva Katta & Kiran Jay Kumar	August 7, 2025
7	"Awakening The Sabha"	Deva Katta & Kiran Jay Kumar	Deva Katta & Kiran Jay Kumar	August 7, 2025
8	"The Caste Fault Lines"	Deva Katta & Kiran Jay Kumar	Deva Katta & Kiran Jay Kumar	August 7, 2025
9	"Surviving The Tsunami"	Deva Katta & Kiran Jay Kumar	Deva Katta & Kiran Jay Kumar	August 7, 2025

== Production ==
Deva Katta started working on the story between 2017 and 2018. As over-the-top media service is not popular, he decided to make it as a film trilogy and wrote the story accordingly. After the raise and success of the streaming media services in India during the COVID-19 pandemic, he decided to make it as a television series.

== Release ==
Mayasabha was released on SonyLIV on 7 August 2025 in Telugu along with dubbed versions in Tamil, Hindi, Kannada and Malayalam languages.

== Reception ==
Sangeetha Devi Dundoo of The Hindu wrote in her review that, "Mayasabha offers a compelling fictional take on real political history, packed with drama, ambition, and reflection". Aditya Devulapally of Cinema Express gave a four of five rating, with particular praise towards Deva Katta's writing. Echoing the same, Suhas Sistu of The Hans India rated it 3.5 out of 5 and called Aadhi Pinisetty's and Chaitanya Rao's performance as "career-best" and "intense" respectively. Giving the same rating, Anisha Rao of India Today called it "gutsy, ambitious, and has its own voice". Sahelee Rakshit of Bollywood Life noted that Aadhi Pinisetty and Chaitanya Rao "win hearts for their intense performances" calling the web series a "must-watch". Sanjeev Kumar of HT Telugu rated it 3.5 out of 5 calling it an 'extremely gripping political thriller' that effectively portrays political power struggles inspired by Chandrababu and Y. S. Rajasekhar Reddy, with balanced character portrayals and suspenseful strategies. A review by Lakshminarayana Varanasi of TV9 Telugu described series as 'the best political series in Telugu'. Nandini Ramnath of Scroll.in described series as a 'heavily spiced-up fictional history of Andhra Pradesh politics' commending its dramatic depiction of political ambition and power struggles. Deccan Chronicle noted that the casting, direction and cinematography are the major positives. Pratyusha Sista of Telangana Today praised the performances of the lead cast and Deva Katta's work. Pratyush Parasuraman of The Hollywood Reporter India compared it with the Tamil film Iruvar (1997) and had a mixed opinion towards the writing.
