= Artiste (film) =

Indian Telugu-language thriller film

- Theatrical release poster
- Directed by: Ratan Rishi
- Story by: Ratan Rishi
- Produced by: James Watt Kommu
- Starring: Sonia Akula; Santosh Kalwacherla; Vinay Varma; Prabhakar; Satyam Rajesh; Tanikella Bharani
- Cinematography: Chandu AJ
- Edited by: RM Vishwanadh Kuchanapally
- Music by: Suresh Bobblli
- Production company: SK Entertainment PVT LTD
- Release date: 21 March 2025
- Country: India
- Language: Telugu

Artiste is a 2025 Indian Telugu-language thriller film directed by Ratan Rishi. The film was produced by James Watt Kommu. The film stars Sonia Akula, Santosh Kalwacherla, Vinay Varma, Prabhakar, Satyam Rajesh, Tanikella Bharani, Thagubothu Ramesh, Sudharshan. The film was theatrically released on 21 March 2025.

== Cast ==
- Sonia Akula as Surekha
- Tanikella Bharani
- Santosh Kalwacherla as Vikky
- Kireeti Damaraju
- Venkey Monkey
- Prabhakar as Ravi
- Satyam Rajesh as Prakash
- Thagubothu Ramesh
- Sneha Madhuri Sharma as Swathi
- Sudharshan
- Vinay Varma as Ravindra
- Bhadram
- Krisheka Patel as Jaanu

== Music ==
The music was composed by Suresh Bobbili and songs released by T-Series audio company.

Track listing
No.	Title	Singer(s)	Length
1.	"Premium Chusthu Chusthu"	Kapil Kapilan	5:20
2.	"Premium Nuvve Naa Oopirive"	S.P.Charan	2:43
3.	"Premium Oh Prema Prema"	Ramya Behara	3:12
4.	"Premium You & Me Not Same"	Lipcika	3:15
Total length:			14:30

== Release ==
Artiste was released theatrically on 21 March 2025. The digital streaming rights of the film were acquired by Amazon Prime, and the film premiered in September 2025.

== Reception ==
Srivathsan Nadadhur of OTT Play found the film was a genre-bender. Another review stated: "Artiste turns out to be a decent crime thriller. Director Ratan Rishi tries to blend the story with crime elements and intense emotions, but this approach acts as a double-edged sword." A mixed review at Sakshi.com praised the twist in the plot and the main male character, founding the overall acting decent.
