= Coronavirus (disambiguation) =

A coronavirus is one of a group of viruses that cause diseases in mammals and birds.

Coronavirus may also refer to:

- SARS-CoV-2, a strain that emerged in 2019
  - COVID-19, a disease caused by SARS-CoV-2
  - COVID-19 pandemic, the global spread of COVID-19
- Coronavirus (film), a 2020 Indian drama film by Agasthya Manju

== See also ==
- SARS, a disease caused by the coronavirus strain SARS-CoV
- MERS, a disease caused by the coronavirus strain MERS-CoV
- Upper respiratory tract infection or the common cold, which may be caused by several different coronaviruses
