= Sharathulu Varthisthai =

2024 film by Kumara Swamy

- Theatrical release poster
- Directed by: Kumara Swamy
- Written by: Kumara Swamy
- Produced by: Srilatha; Nagarjuna Samala; Sharada; Sreesh Kumar Gunda; Vijaya; Dr Krishnakanth Chittajallu
- Starring: Chaitanya Rao Madadi; Bhoomi Shetty; Nanda Kishore; Santosh Yadav; Deva Raj Palamuru
- Cinematography: Praveen Vanamali; Shekar Pochampally
- Edited by: Ch.Vamshi Krishna; Gajjala Rakshith Kumar
- Music by: Arun Chiluveru; Suresh Bobili
- Production company: Starlight Studios Pvt Ltd
- Release date: 15 March 2024
- Country: India
- Language: Telugu

Sharathulu Varthisthai (transl. Conditions Apply) is a 2024 Indian Telugu-language family drama film, written and directed by Kumaraswamy (Akshara). It stars Chaitanya Rao Madadi, Bhoomi Shetty, Nanda Kishore, Santosh Yadav, Devaraj Palamuru and Venky Monkey in the main roles. The music is composed by Arun Chiluveru and Suresh Bobili (Pannendu Gunjala). The film was released to negative reviews although the cast's performance was praised.

== Plot ==
Chiranjeevi is a middle-class man working in a government office and lives in a small neighbourhood in Karimnagar along with his mom, brother, and sister. He is in a long-term relationship with village girl Vijayashanthi who has been his support system since childhood. After overcoming initial obstacles, both families agree to unite the couple. Their wedding celebration doesn't last long as their lives take an unforeseen turn when Chiranjeevi's friends introduce him to a multi-level marketing scheme. This fraud disturbs his life. How Chiranjeevi comes out of these circumstances of his life forms is the rest of the story.

== Cast ==
- Chaitanya Rao Madadi as Chiranjeevi
- Bhoomi Shetty as Vijayashanthi
- Nanda Kishore as Hari Sir
- Santosh Yadav as Shankar Anna, Basti leader
- Devaraj Palamuru
- Padmavati as Lachchava, Chiranjeevi's mother
- Venky Monkey as Rajesh, Chiranjeevi's friend
- Shiva Kalyan as Sunny, Chiranjeevi's friend
- Sai Goud as Sudhakar, Chiranjeevi's friend
- Mallesh Blast
- Seetha Mahalakshmi
- Peddinti Ashok Kumar
- Sujatha Deekshith
- Shruti Pallepogu as Sreeja, Chiranjeevi's sister
- Nabeel Afridi as Charan, Chiranjeevi's brother
- Sowjanya
- Guntula Radhika
- RJ Avinash
- Shiva Goud
- Swarna Kilari
- Sambbatoori Suneetha
- Narsavva

== Music ==
Sharathulu Varthisthai

Soundtrack album by Arun Chiluveru
- Released: 2024
- Recorded: 2023
- Genre: Soundtrack
- Producer: Arun Chiluveru

Arun Chiluveru chronology
Sashi (2021)	Sharathulu Varthisthai (2024)

The music was composed by Arun Chiluveru and Suresh Bobili (Pannendu Gunjala), lyrics by Goreti Venkanna, Peddinti Ashok Kumar and Mallegoda Gangaprasad.

Track list
No.	Title	Lyrics	Singer(s)	Length
1.	"Pannendu Gunjala"	Peddinti Ashok Kumar	Shankar Babu, Telu Vijaya, Vollala vani, Mogulla Shankaramma	5:29
2.	"Kaalam Supula"	Goreti Venkanna	Ram Miriyala	3:34
3.	"Pala Pittale"	Mallegoda Ganga Prasad	Haricharan, Bhargavi Pillai	4:00
4.	"Aakaasham Andaani"	Chaitanya Pingali	Naresh Iyer, Nayana Nair

== Release and reception ==
The film was released theatrically on 15 March 2024.

A critic from The Hindu wrote that "It’s the writing that needed some zing, without which the film ends up as a well-intended but mundane public service announcement cautioning people to stay away from chit funds and gold schemes that promise big gains within a short time".

=== Home media ===
The film premiered on Aha from 18 May 2024.
