= Soniya Akula =

Indian actress

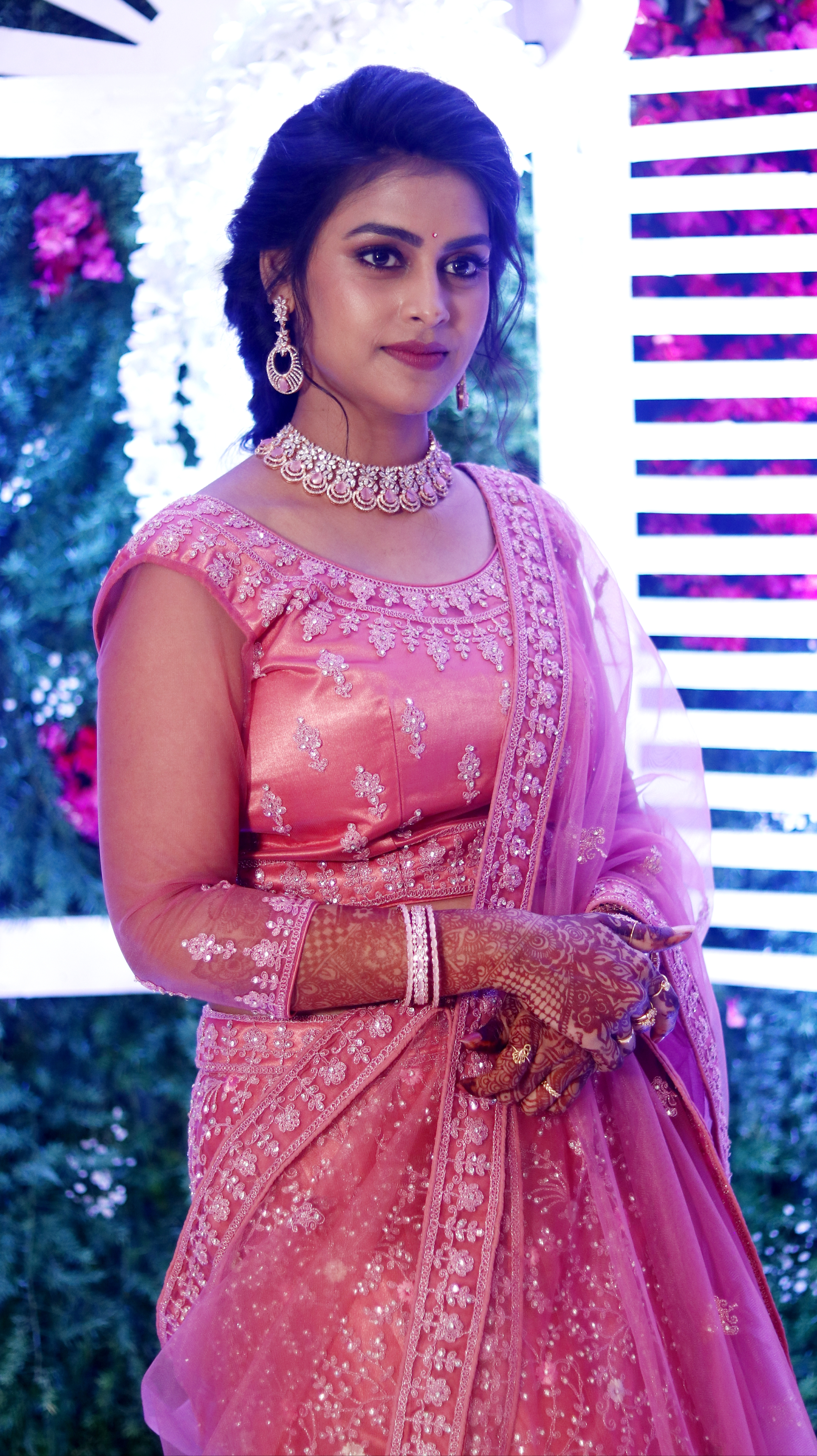
- Soniya Akula in 2021
- Born: Gajullapally, Manthani Mandal, Peddapalli district, Telangana, India
- Education: B.Tech, LLB
- Occupation: Actress
- Years active: 2019–present
- Spouse: Yashpal Veeragoni (m. 2024)
- Parent(s): Chakrapani, Malleshwari

Soniya Akula is an Indian actress who works in Telugu-language films. She made her film debut in 2019 with George Reddy.

In 2024, she participated in Bigg Boss Telugu 8 and was evicted on Day 28.

== Early life ==
Akula was born in Gajullapally village, Manthani Mandal, Peddapalli district, Telangana. She later grew up in Agra.

She completed her B.Tech from Bhojreddy Engineering College in Hyderabad.

== Career ==
Akula began her acting career with George Reddy (2019), where she played the protagonist's sister.

In 2020, she appeared in Ram Gopal Varma's film Coronavirus as Shanthi. She later played the lead role in Aasha Encounter (2022).

In 2025, she appeared in the film Artiste, portraying the role of Surekha.

== Filmography ==
=== Films ===
| Year | Title | Role |
|---|---|---|
| 2019 | George Reddy | Sister of George Reddy |
| 2020 | Coronavirus | Shanthi |
| 2022 | Aasha Encounter | Aasha |
| 2025 | Artiste | Surekha |

=== Television ===
| Year | Title | Role | Notes |
|---|---|---|---|
| 2024 | Bigg Boss Telugu 8 | Contestant | Evicted (Day 28) |
| 2024 | iSmart Jodi Season 3 | Contestant | |
