= Mismatch (2019 film) =

2019 Telugu-language film

- Theatrical release poster
- Directed by: N V Nirmal Kumar
- Screenplay by: Bhupathi Raja
- Story by: Bhupathi Raja
- Produced by: G Srirama Raju; Bharath Ram
- Starring: Uday Shankar; Aishwarya Rajesh
- Cinematography: Ganesh Chandrra
- Edited by: SP Raja Sethupathi
- Music by: Gifton Elias
- Production company: Adhiroh Creative Signs LLP
- Release date: 6 December 2019
- Running time: 132 minutes
- Country: India
- Language: Telugu

Mismatch (stylized as Mis(s)match) is a 2019 Telugu-language romantic sports film directed by N. V. Nirmal Kumar. The film stars Uday Shankar and Aishwarya Rajesh in the lead roles.

== Cast ==
- Uday Shankar as Siddharth
  - Master Adhiroh as younger Siddharth

The sequence where he repeats thousands of numbers from memory is based on Shankar's real life.

- Aishwarya Rajesh as Mahalakshmi
- Pradeep Rawat as Mahalakshmi's father
- Sanjay Swaroop as Siddharth's father
- Naga Mahesh as a villager
- Ravulapati Venkata Ramarao in negative role
- Malakpet Shailaja as a villager
- Bhadram as Bhadram
- Rupa Lakshmi as Mahalakshmi's mother
- Sandhya Janak
- Sharanya Pradeep as Mahalakshmi's friend
- Padma Jayanthi as Mahalakshmi's aunt
- Laxman
- Munna

== Production ==
Uday Shanker, who was last seen in the film Aatagadharaa Siva (2018), wanted to do a film with a message. N. V. Nirmal Kumar, who had previously directed the Tamil film Salim (2014), was chosen to direct the film.

== Soundtrack ==
Mismatch

Soundtrack album by Gifton Elias
- Released: 2019
- Recorded: 2019
- Genre: Feature film soundtrack
- Length: 29:22
- Label: Lahari Music, T-Series
- Producer: Gifton Elias

Gifton Elias chronology
Hawaa (2019)	Mismatch (2019)
External audio
- Official Audio Jukebox on YouTube

The songs were composed by Gifton Elias. The first single, "Arere Arere", was launched by Trivikram Srinivas on 25 November 2019. The song "Ee Manase" from Tholi Prema was remixed and used in the film.

Track list
No.	Title	Lyrics	Singer(s)	Length
1.	"Rajadhiraja"	Suddala Ashok Teja	Dhanunjay, Satya Yamini, Saicharan Bhaskaruni	5:09
2.	"Arere"	Shreshta	M M Manasi	5:13
3.	"Ee Manase – Remix"	Sirivennela Seetharama Sastry	LV Revanth	4:22
4.	"Kannaale Kalalenno"	Dharma Teja	Hariharan	6:33
5.	"Ee Manase – Remix" (Female Version)	Sirivennela Seetaram Sastry	Lipsika, Noel Sean	4:48
6.	"Cheyy Joggingu Jumpingu"	Suddala Ashok Teja	Mohana Bhogaraju	3:17
Total length:				29:22

== Release ==
The film released on 6 December.

=== Critical reception ===
This film received positive reviews from fans and polarized reviews from critics. The Hans India gave 3.5 of 5 stars and stated that "On the whole, 'Mismatch' is a decent entertainer". The Times of India gave 2 of 5 stars and praised the performances of Rajesh and Rawat, but stated how "there’s only so much they can do to save the film from a routine script and terrible narration".
