= Goreti Venkanna =

Indian poet (born 1963)

Gorati Venkanna
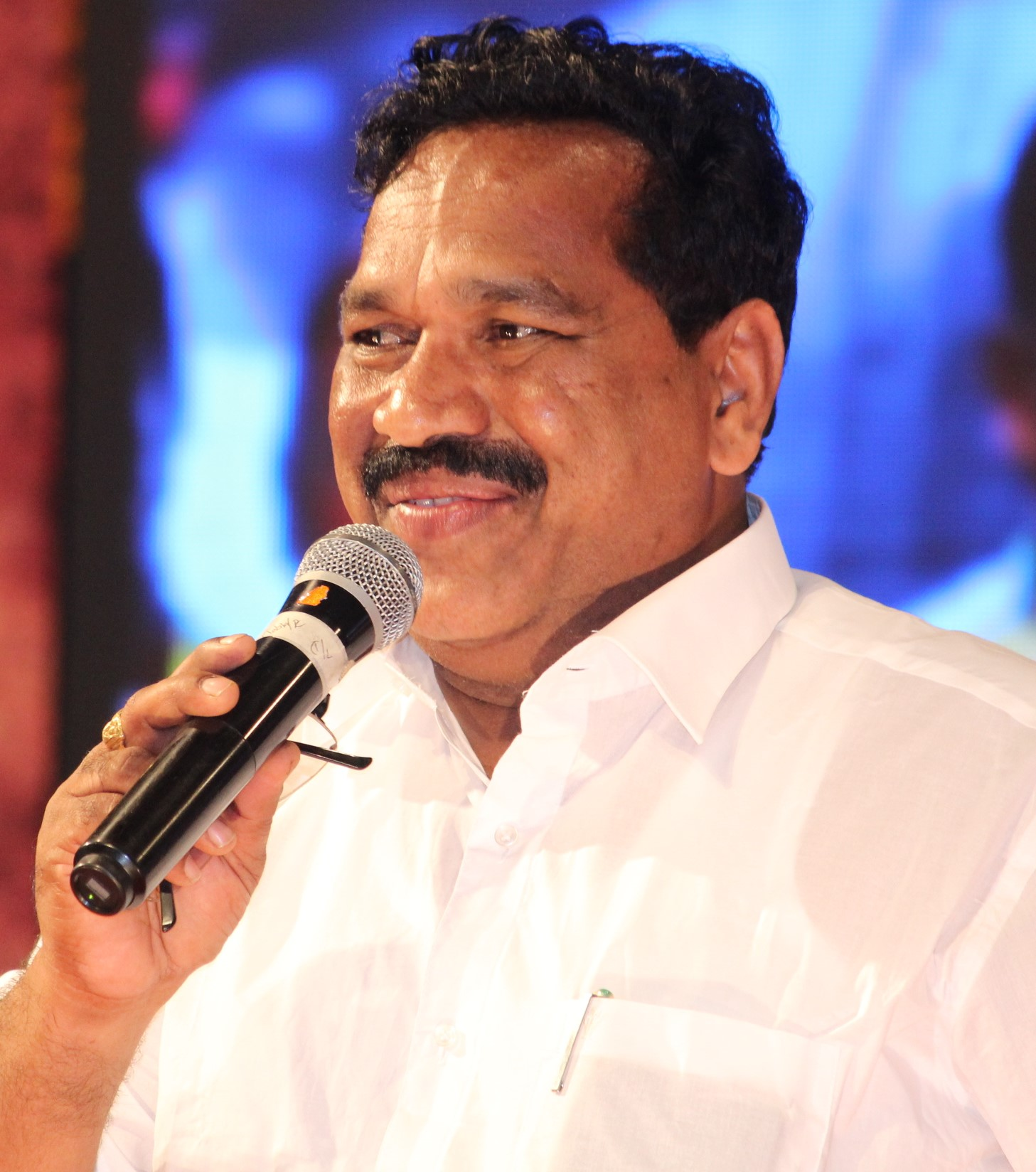
- Goreti in 2014
- Born: Gorati Venkataiah; 4 April 1965 (age 61); Gowraram
- Occupations: Lyricist, poet, singer
- Spouse: Anasuya
- Writing career
- Language: Telugu
- Years active: 2000–present
- Genres: Folk, filmi
- Notable awards: Kala Ratna (2006); Kaloji Narayana Rao Award (2016); Sahitya Akademi Award (2021)

Member of Telangana Legislative Council
- Incumbent
- Assumed office 15 November 2020
- Constituency: Nominated

Gorati Venkataiah (born 4 April 1965), better known as Goreti Venkanna, is an Indian poet and singer known for his works in Telugu literature. He became popular after his song "Palle Kanneru Peduthundo" in the film Kubusam. He also acted as a judge for the folk song program Rela Re Rela on Star Maa. In November 2020, Goreti was nominated as a Member of the Legislative Council (MLC) under the Governor's quota in the non-political category, representing the field of arts in Telangana. In 2021, he won the Sahitya Akademi Award in poetry category for his work Vallanki Taalam.

He was awarded with a cash award of ₹1 crore at Telangana Formation Day celebrations in Parade Grounds, Secunderabad on 2 June 2025 for his contributions to the Telangana movement.

== Early life ==
Goreti Venkataiah was born on 4 April 1965 in Gowraram village of present-day Nagarkurnool district in Telangana, India to Goreti Narasiah and Eeramam. Most of his childhood was spent in singing the native folk songs describing the lives of peasants and the farmers of Telangana. He is one of the famous singers and lyricists from Telangana.

Goreti completed his postgraduate in MA and worked in Government services. He is married to Anasuya.

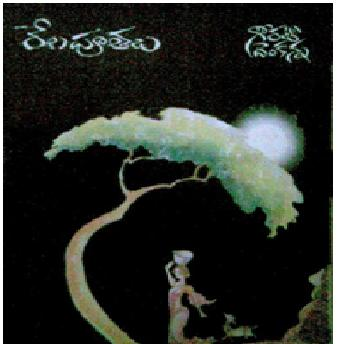
Relaputalu

== Career ==
Goreti Venkanna is the lyricist for the Telugu movie, Batukamma.

Although, he is not a commercial movie lyricist, he composed songs for various movies. Most popular amongst these is Palle Kanneeru Pedutundo from the movie Kubusam. He also composed a song about the Rayalaseema factionism sung on TV 9 channel a popular news channel. His other works though not limited to, include a song for the movie "Maisamma IPS". His songs are predominantly known for their composition on the Telangana State.

== Books ==
Venkanna's songs are published:

- Eku naadam Motha
- Rela Poothalu
- Alasandra Vanka
- Pusina Punnam
- Vallanki Taalam

== Awards ==
- 2006: Kala Ratna or Hamsa Award for Literature from AP State Government
- 2016: Kaloji Narayana Rao Award from Telangana State Government.
- 2021: Sahitya Akademi Award for Vallanki Taalam from Ministry of Culture, Government of India.

== Filmography ==
- Encounter
- Sri Ramulayya
- Vooru Manadiraa
- Kubusam
- Vegu Chukkalu
- Maha Yagnam
- Maisamma IPS
- Bathukamma
- Nagaram Nidra Potunna Vela
- People's War
- Bhandook
- Basthi
- Bilalpur Police Station
- Annadata Sukhibhava
- Mallesham
- Dorasaani
- Sheesh Mahal
- Sharathulu Varthisthai
