= Paarijatha Parvam =

2024 Indian film by Santosh Kambhampati

- Theatrical release poster
- Directed by: Santosh Kambhampati
- Written by: Santosh Kambhampati
- Story by: Naveen Kola
- Produced by: Mahidhar Reddy; Devesh
- Starring: Sunil; Harsha Chemudu; Shraddha Das; Malavika Satheesan; Srikanth Iyengar; Chaitanya Rao Madadi
- Cinematography: Bala Saraswathi
- Edited by: Sasank Vupputuri
- Music by: Ree
- Production company: Vanamali Creations
- Release date: 19 April 2024
- Running time: 131 minutes
- Country: India
- Language: Telugu

Paarijatha Parvam is a 2024 Indian Telugu-language crime comedy film written and directed by Santosh Kambhampati. The film is produced by Vanamali Creations and features Sunil, Harsha Chemudu, Shraddha Das, Malavika Satheesan, Srikanth Iyengar and Chaitanya Rao Madadi in important roles. Paarijatha Parvam was released on 19 April 2024.

== Plot Summary ==
Paarijatha Parvam follows Chaitanya, an aspiring filmmaker who struggles to secure support for his debut project. After repeated rejections from producers, he devises a desperate plan to finance his film: kidnap the mistress of producer Shetty in order to extort the money he needs.

However, Chaitanya’s plan quickly becomes complicated when another pair, Bar Srinu and Paru also attempt to abduct the same woman for reasons of their own. Their simultaneous schemes collide, creating a chaotic series of errors, misunderstandings, and comedic confrontations. The overlapping kidnapping attempts trigger a chain of unpredictable events, forcing each group to navigate escalating confusion and hidden motives.

As the story unfolds, loyalties shift and secrets surface surrounding Shetty’s personal life, blurring the lines between victims and perpetrators. Between the bungled plans and the clashing ambitions of the would be kidnappers, Chaitanya must confront whether his dream of filmmaking is worth the increasingly tangled web he has spun. Ultimately, the film blends dark humor with crime‑driven drama as it explores how misplaced ambition and desperation can spiral into absurdity.

== Cast ==
- Sunil as Bar Seenu
- Harsha Chemudu as Harsha
- Shraddha Das as Parvathy
- Malavika Satheesan
- Srikanth Iyengar as Shetty
- Chaitanya Rao Madadi as Chaitanya
- Sameer
- Gundu Sudarshan
- Surekha Vani
- Rohini Noni

== Music ==
The film's soundtrack album and background score were composed by Kee.

All music is composed by Ree.

Track list
No.	Title	Lyrics	Singer(s)	Length
1.	"Ninginunchi Jaare"	Kittu Vissapragada	Haricharan, Lipsika
2.	"Rang Rang Rangeela"	Ramajogayya Sastry	Hemachandra, Meghana
3.	"Kidnap Anthem"	Leni	Leni
4.	"Dimbhaka"	Ramajogayya Sastry	Hemachandra
5.	"Ra Pada"	Sri Sai Kiran	Baba Sehgal
6.	"Rang Rang Rangeela (Female)"	Ramajogayya Sastry	Shraddha Das

== Release ==
Paarijatha Parvam was released on 19 April 2024. Post-theatrical digital streaming rights were acquired by Aha and was premiered on 12 June 2024. It is also available on both Lionsgate Play and Amazon Prime Video

== Reception ==
The Times of India rated the film 2.5 out of 5, praising cinematography and music the critic wrote that "Paarijatha Parvam presents a mix of humour and crime that entertains in spurts but doesn't quite coalesce into a fully satisfying action comedy". Sashidhar Adivi of Times Now gave a rating of 2 out of 5 and stated that "Paarijatha Parvam is a contrived kidnap drama with largely weak performances and a load of jokes that don't land", with some praise to the music.
