= Nachindi Girl Friendu =

2022 Indian film

- Official poster
- Directed by: Guru Pawan
- Written by: Guru Pawan
- Produced by: Atluri Narayan Rao
- Starring: Uday Shankar; Jennifer Emmanuel
- Cinematography: Siddam Manohar
- Edited by: Sagar Udagandla
- Music by: Gifton Elias
- Production company: Sriram Movies
- Release date: 11 November 2022
- Country: India
- Language: Telugu

Nachindi Girl Friendu (transl. The girlfriend I like) is a 2022 Indian Telugu-language action thriller film directed by Guru Pawan and starring Uday Shankar and Jennifer Emmanuel.

== Cast ==
- Uday Shankar as Rajaram
- Jennifer Emmanuel as Sandhya alias Sandy
- Madhunandan as Cherry
- Suman as Mukesh
- Srikanth Iyengar as Krishna Pandey
- Prudhviraj as Police inspector
- Saurav Lokesh as Vikram Roy
- Gayatri Bhargavi as Rajaram's mother

== Production ==
Atluri Narayan Rao's English professor's son Uday Shankar was cast after Atluri Narayan Rao saw Uday Shankar's previous films.

== Soundtrack ==
The songs were composed by Gifton Elias.

1. "Manasa Manasa" - Karthik, Harika Narayan
2. "Erra Tholu Pilla" - Dhanunjay
3. "Dosth Ante Nuvve Ra"- Rahul Sipligunj

== Reception ==
A critic from The Times of India wrote that "Overall, Nachindi Girl Friendu, directed by Guru Pawan and featuring Uday Shankar and Jenifer Emmanuel, is a youthful, entertaining thriller if you can look past the rationale in some sequences". A critic from Sakshi Post wrote that "Nachindi Girl Friend is a suspense thriller film. Give it a shot!" A critic from The Hans India wrote that "Director Gurupawan has made an effort to rethink the purpose of the daylong journey from Vizag to Bhimili. He adds tension and thriller elements to the love track, and he impressively moves the plot forward". A critic from NTV rated the film two out of five.
