= Dear Nanna =

2024 Indian Telugu-language film by Anji Saladhi

- Release poster
- Directed by: Anji Saladhi
- Screenplay by: Anji Saladhi
- Story by: Rakesh Mahankali
- Produced by: Rakesh Mahankali
- Starring: Surya; Chaitanya Rao Madadi
- Cinematography: Anith Madadi
- Edited by: Shravan Katikaneni
- Music by: Gifton Elias
- Production company: Black Pepper Cinemas
- Distributed by: Aha
- Release date: 14 June 2024
- Running time: 40 minutes
- Country: India
- Language: Telugu

Dear Nanna is a 2024 Indian Telugu-language drama film co-written and directed by Anji Saladhi. The film stars Surya and Chaitanya Rao Madadi in the lead roles.

The film was released on Aha on 14 June 2024.

== Cast ==
- Surya as Ravi
- Chaitanya Rao Madadi as Surya, Ravi's son
- Yashna Chowdary Muthuluri
- Shashank
- Madhunandan

== Release ==
Dear Nanna was originally scheduled to have a theatrical release, but ultimately had a direct-to-video release on Aha on 14 June 2024.

== Reception ==
OTTPlay gave a rating of 2 out if 5 and stated, "Dear Nanna is quite routine and has the same predictable narration" Andhra Jyothi praised the performances of lead and supporting cast.
