= Killing of Pranay Perumalla =

2018 honour killing in India

The Miryalaguda honour killing refers to the murder of Pranay Kumar, a 23-year-old Indian man from the marginalized Dalit community, who had married a woman outside his caste. Kumar was murdered on 14 September 2018 in Miryalaguda, Telangana, India, in front of his 23-year old wife, Amrutha Varshini, who was five months pregnant. The killer reportedly had a contract for ₹1 crore (US$140,000), paid for by Amrutha's father and uncle.

The Nalgonda SC and ST Sessions Court on 10 March 2025 sentenced Subhash (A-2) to death and life imprisonment to the other six accused involved in the crime under IPC Sections 302 (murder), 120B (criminal conspiracy), 109 (abetment), 1989 (SC/ST Act), and provisions of the Indian Arms Act, 1959. The main accused, Amrutha’s father Maruthi Rao, died by suicide in March 2020.

== Background ==
Pranay and Amrutha were childhood friends. Her paternal uncle Sravan used to beat her for being friendly with Pranay, because he was a Dalit. Amrutha's father had asked her to undergo an abortion. He later pressured her doctor to abort the pregnancy.

== Murder ==
On 14 September 2018, Amrutha, Pranay, and Pranay's mother went to the hospital because Amrutha had pain in her back. A man followed them, and struck Pranay with an axe twice. The man was later identified to be Subash Kumar.

== Aftermath ==
Maruthi Rao was found dead in his room at the Arya Vysya Bhavan in Khairatabad on the morning of 8 March 2020. The Saifabad police said that he killed himself using poison and he left a suicide note. He was in Hyderabad to meet with an advocate who works in the Telangana High Court. Rao was reported to be depressed and thought he may be convicted of Pranay's murder.

Thousands attended Pranay's funeral. A justice website was created, and a candlelight vigil was announced with support from the members of the Telugu film industry.

Ram Gopal Varma directed a film, Murder, based on Pranay's death. Pranay's father filed police complaints against Ram Gopal Varma and Natti Karuna (the producer of the film). On 24 August, the Nalgonda district court delayed the release of the film and its promotional materials. On appeal, the Telangana High Court overturned the Nalgonda court's ruling, with the stipulations that Varma's film should not mention the names of Amrutha, Pranay, or Maruthi Rao directly in the film and that the film should not directly reference anything that happened to Amrutha.

Amrutha was prevented from attending her father's last rites by her paternal uncle Sravan, who blamed her for her father's death. She was escorted by police to her father's funeral procession, and was quickly whisked away after a mob of her father's supporters yelled at her to leave. They blamed her for her father's death and yelled "Maruthi Rao amar rahe" (transl. long live Maruthi Rao). They also blocked her path as she attempted to move closer to the body.

Amrutha blames casteism for her husband's death and says that "separate fast track courts" must be made to prosecute murders committed because of the victim's caste. She said she would never return to her biological family's home and will continue to live with Pranay's parents. She condemned the killing of Hemanth Kumar by his wife's family members on social media.
