= Aasha Encounter =

2022 Indian Telugu-language film

- Film poster
- Directed by: Anand Chandra; Ram Gopal Varma (uncredited)
- Story by: Ram Gopal Varma (uncredited)
- Produced by: Anuraag Kancharla
- Starring: Srikanth Iyengar; Sonia Akula; Praveen Raj
- Cinematography: Jagadeesh Cheekati & Josh
- Edited by: Srikanth Patnaik & Manish Thakur
- Music by: Anand
- Production company: Anuraag Kancharla Productions
- Release date: 1 January 2022
- Country: India
- Language: Telugu

Aasha Encounter is a 2022 Indian Telugu-language docudrama film based on the 2019 gang assault and subsequent killing of a young woman in Hyderabad. It is directed by Anand Chandra. The film was released on 1 January 2022.

== Plot ==
On 27 November 2019 in Hyderabad, a female veterinary doctor named Aasha (pseudonym given to protect the victim's identity) was brutally gang-raped by 4 men and killed by burning her body under a highway bridge. This incident shocked the country and the criminals had crossed the upper limits in the crime history of India. The police quickly arrested the criminals and when the police tried to reconstruct the crime scene, the criminals snatched the police guns and tried to escape but were subsequently killed in a police encounter.

== Cast ==
- Srikanth Iyengar as a NHRC Chief
- Soniya Akula as Aasha
- Sridhar Rao as Bharath

== Production ==
This film was initially announced to be jointly directed by Ram Gopal Varma and Anand Chandra under the title Disha Encounter, but the name was changed due to the victim's family asking the police regarding the same. However, the film had issues getting a CBFC certificate and Varma later disassociated himself from the film.

== Release and reception ==
The film was released on 1 January 2022. An NTV critic gave a mixed review for the film, appreciating the performances and score while criticizing screenplay and inconclusive climax.
