= Srikanth Iyengar =

Indian actor

- Born: Srikanth Krishnaswamy Iyengar
- Occupations: Actor, director
- Years active: 2005-present

Srikanth Krishnaswamy Iyengar is an Indian actor and director who works in Telugu cinema.

== Career ==
He is a medical doctor by profession and turned actor due to passion towards the acting. He worked as an assistant director for the Deccani film The Angrez (2005) before turning director through the English film Stalemate… it's your move (2007), which was made on the backdrop of cancer. He directed the documentary Ammulu and April Fool (2014).

He starred in films like Ante Sundaraniki (2021), Raja Raja Chora (2021) and Pottel (2023). He produced the unreleased film Yanam in 2022.

== Filmography ==
†	Denotes films that have not yet been released

=== Telugu films ===
Year	Title	Role	Notes
2013	Chammak Challo	Anshu's father	credited as Dr. K.S.I.
2014	Basanti	Gaazi	credited as Dr. K.S.I.
2016	Ism	Trivedi	
2017	Paisa Vasool	Minister Amit Patel	
2018	Agnyaathavaasi	Sampath's assistant	
2018	Mehbooba	Police Officer	
2018	Officer	Bajrangi	
2018	Neevevaro	Anu's father	
2019	Brochevarevarura	Radha Krishna	
2019	Dear Comrade	Police Officer	
2019	Prati Roju Pandage	Sai's uncle	
2020	V	Rashid	
2020	47 Days	Raja Ram	
2020	Corona Virus	Anand Rao	
2020	Murder	Madhava Rao	
2020	Amaram Akhilam Prema	Akhila's father	
2020	Valliddari Madhya	Buchi Babu	
2021	Chaavu Kaburu Challaga	Mohan	
2021	Naandhi	Defence Lawyer	
2021	Gaali Sampath	Haribabu	
2021	Vakeel Saab	CI Yugandher	
2021	SR Kalyanamandapam	Paparao	
2021	Raja Raja Chora	Dr. Tirumala Rao	
2021	Vivaha Bhojanambu	Ramakrishna	
2021	Tuck Jagadish	MRO Mohan Rao	
2021	Republic	SP Gopal Rao	
2021	Idhe Maa Katha	Ajay's father	
2021	Most Eligible Bachelor	Harsha's godfather	
2021	1997		
2022	Aasha Encounter	NHRC Chief	
2022	Rowdy Boys	Akshay's father	
2022	Valliddari Madhya	Buchi Babu	
2022	Hero	Mumbai police	
2022	Bhala Thandanana	Sasi's brother-in-law	
2022	F3	Sharma	
2022	Gangster Gangaraju	Narsareddy	
2022	Ante Sundaraniki	Jogarao	
2022	Pakka Commercial	Judge	
2022	Tees Maar Khan	Ranga Rajan	
2022	Bujji Ila Raa	Keshava's father-in-law	
2022	Dongalunnaru Jaagratha	Police officer	
2022	The Ghost	Harish	
2022	Aa Ammayi Gurinchi Meeku Cheppali	Manohar	
2022	Nachindi Girl Friendu	Krishna Pandey	
2023	Valentine's Night	Businessman	
2023	Nenu Student Sir!	Bank Manager	
2023	Ugram	Circle Inspector	
2023	Chakravyuham:The Trap	Srinivas	
2023	Samajavaragamana	Rama Krishna	
2023	Kushi	Chatur	
2023	Bedurulanka 2012	Brahmam	Santosham Best Supporting Actor Award
2023	Guns Trance Action		
2023	Krishna Rama		
2023	Spark Life	Lekha's father	
2023	Extra Ordinary Man	Anand Rao	
2024	Om Bheem Bush	Ranjith Vinukonda	
2024	Geethanjali Malli Vachindi	Govinda Govinda	
2024	Paarijatha Parvam	Shetty	
2024	Prathinidhi 2		
2024	14	Subbu	
2024	Sarangadhariya	Manager	
2024	Bhale Unnade	Dr Anand Kumar	
2024	Pottel	Duryodhana	
2025	Hathya		
2025	Racharikam	Raja Reddy	
2025	Sankranthiki Vasthunam	Rajahmundry MLA	
2025	Thammudu	Shiva	
2025	Bakasura Restaurant	Chakravarthy	
2025	They Call Him OG	Satya Dada’s Port member	
2025	Ari: My Name is Nobody	Chaitanya	
2025	Kishkindhapuri	Murugan	
2026	Nari Nari Naduma Murari	Principal Krishnaprasad	
2026	Vishnu Vinyasam	Manisha’s adoptive father	
2026	S Saraswathi		
2026	Gedela Raju Kakinada Taluka	Durga	
2026	Peddi	Bhaskar Rao	

=== Other language films ===
Year	Title	Role	Language	Notes
2005	The Angrez	Raju	English; Deccani	Uncredited
2007	Stalemate… it's your move	Oncologist	English	
2016	Killing Veerappan	Ex-police officer Kumar	Kannada	
2016	Veerappan	Ex-police officer Kumar	Hindi	
2019	Kavacha	Natraj	Kannada	
2025	Jaat	District collector	Hindi	

=== As a film director ===
Year	Title	Language	Notes
2007	Stalemate… it's your move	English	
2011	Ammulu	Telugu	Documentary
2014	April Fool	Telugu	

=== Television ===
Year	Title	Role	Network
2021	11th Hour	Sundar Das	Aha
2021	Game	Varma	Hungama
2021	The Baker and The Beauty	Venkateshwarlu Dasaripalle	Aha
2023–2024	Save the Tigers	Jagan	Disney+ Hotstar
2025	Mayasabha	Chekuri Babu Rao	SonyLIV
