= Murder (2020 film) =

- Kutumba Kadha Chitram
- Directed by: Anand Chandra
- Written by: Anand Chandra
- Produced by: Ram Gopal Varma; Anuraag Kancharla
- Starring: Srikanth Iyengar; Sahithi
- Cinematography: Jagadeesh Cheekati
- Edited by: Srikanth patnaik
- Music by: DSR
- Production company: Anuraag Kancharla Productions
- Release date: 24 December 2020
- Running time: 113 minutes
- Country: India
- Language: Telugu

Murder is a 2020 Indian Telugu-language crime thriller film directed by Anand Chandra, and produced by Ram Gopal Varma and Anuraag Kancharla.

== Plot ==
This film story is based on many of the true stories including 2018 Miryalaguda honour killing.

== Cast ==
- Srikanth Iyyengar as Madhava Rao
- Sahithi Avancha as Namratha
- Gayatri Bhargavi as Vanaja
- Keshav Deepak as Narasimha
- Ganesh Naidu as Praveen
- Giridhar as Madhava Rao's brother
- SS Vermaa as Madhava Rao's Watchman
- Sumit Keshri as Praveen's friend

== Reception ==
Rentala Jayadeva in his review for Sakshi, appreciated the technical aspects of the film such as cinematography and film score while criticizing the weak plotline and mediocre performances. Asianet News critic Surya Prakash rated the film 2.5/5, noted Srikanth Iyyengar and Sahithi's performance as father and daughter, but pointed out the predictable screenplay and slow narration.
