= Chaitanya Rao Madadi =

Indian actor (born 1989)

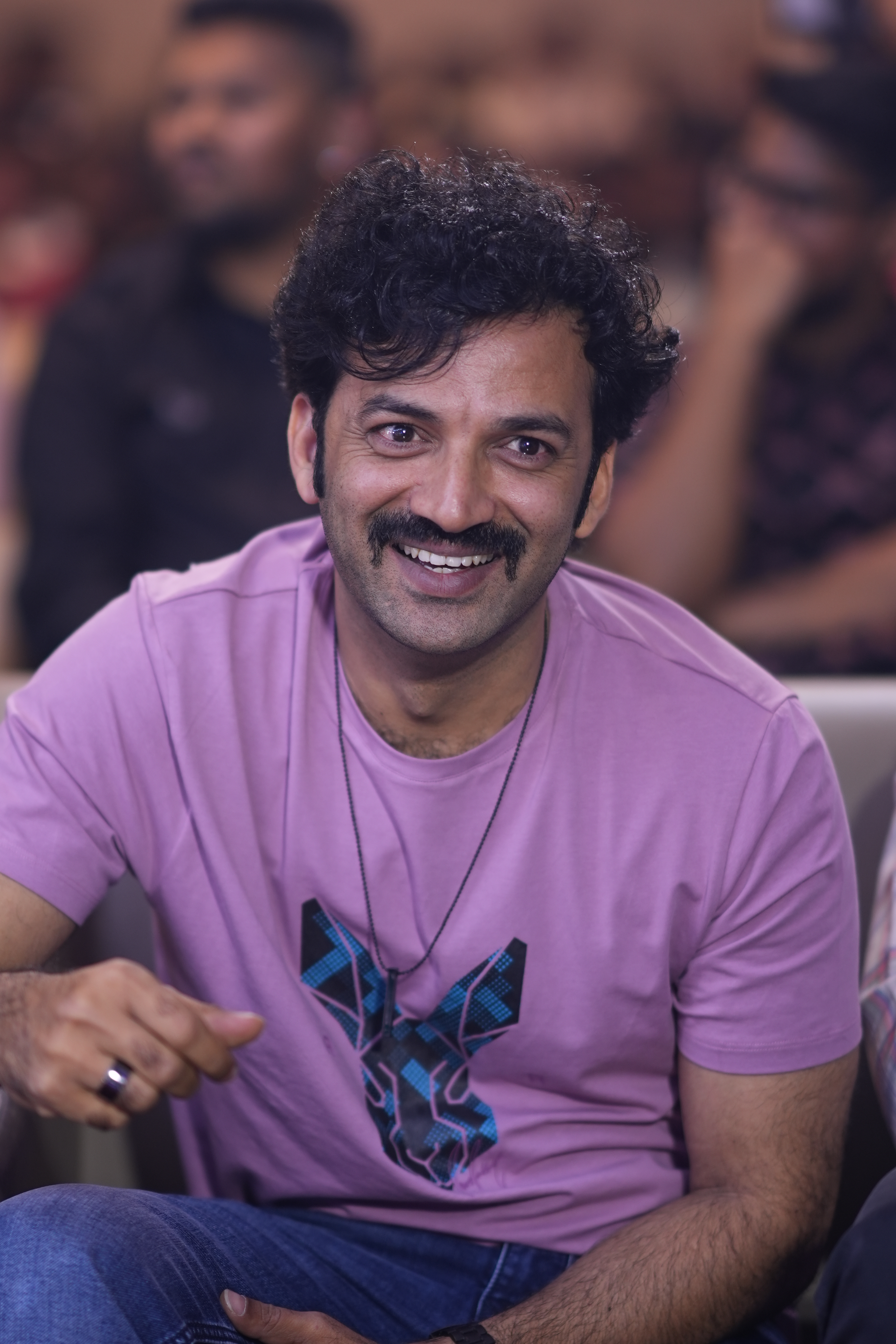
- Born: 13 July 1989 (age 37); Karimnagar, Andhra Pradesh (now in Telangana), India
- Education: Osmania University
- Occupation: Actor
- Years active: 2015-present

Chaitanya Rao Madadi (born 13 July 1989) is an Indian actor who works in Telugu cinema. He made his debut with Bhandook (2015) and then appeared in films such as Valentines Night, Annapurna Photo Studio and Keedaa Cola.

== Career ==
Chaitanya returned to Hyderabad to pursue a career in acting and was then trained at Ramanand acting School. He started his acting career with Bandook (2015). He appeared in minor roles in a few films like Premam (2016) and Shamantakamani (2017). Chaitanya acted in the lead role as Charlie in Hawaa (2019), which is the first Telugu movie to be shot entirely in Australia.

Chaitanya then acted in a web series 30 Weds 21 (2021) on YouTube, which gave him recognition. He played a character that suffered from Tourette syndrome in Keedaa Cola (2023) and took three days to prepare for the role.

== Filmography ==
Key
†	Denotes films that have not yet been released

Year	Title	Role		Ref.
2015	Bhandook	Chaitanya		
2016	Premam		Uncredited	
2017	Shamantakamani	Ravi		
2019	Hawaa	Charlie		
2020	Guvva Gorinka	Aarya		
2021	Vakeel Saab		Uncredited	
2021	Thimmarusu	Aravind		
2022	Mukhachitram	Dr. Satya		
2022	Jagamemaya	Ajay		
2023	A Journey to Kasi			
2023	Valentines Night	Ajay		
2023	Annapurna Photo Studio	Chanti		
2023	Keedaa Cola	Vaasthu		
2024	Sharathulu Varthisthai	Chiranjeevi		
2024	Paarijatha Parvam	Chaitanya		
2024	Dear Nanna	Surya	Short film	
2024	Honeymoon Express	Eshan		
2024	Theppa Samudram	Ganesh		
2025	Ghaati	Kundhul Naidu		
2026	Repu Udayam 10 Gantalaku	Raghu		

=== Television ===
Year	Title	Role	Network	Notes	Ref.
2021–2022	30 Weds 21	Prudhvi	YouTube	Web debut	
2025	AIR: All India Rankers	Surya	ETV Win		
2025	Mayasabha	M. S. Rami Reddy	SonyLIV		
