= Coronavirus (film) =

2020 drama film directed by Agasthya Manju

- Release poster
- Directed by: Agasthya Manju
- Written by: Kalyan Raghav Pasupula
- Screenplay by: Agasthya Manju
- Story by: Ram Gopal Varma
- Produced by: Ram Gopal Varma; Nannapur Reddy; Yella Reddy
- Starring: Srikanth Iyengar
- Cinematography: V. Malaharbhatt Joshi
- Edited by: Nagendra
- Music by: DSR
- Production companies: A Company / CM Creations Production; Green Metro Production
- Distributed by: RGV World Theatre
- Release date: 11 December 2020
- Running time: 84 minutes
- Country: India
- Language: Telugu

Coronavirus is a 2020 Indian Telugu-language thriller drama film produced by Ram Gopal Varma and directed by Agasthya Manju. The film is about a family exposed to the virus during the COVID-19 lockdown in India.

== Cast ==
- Srikanth Iyengar as Anand Rao
- Vamsee Chaganti as Karthik, Anand Rao's elder son
- Kalpa Latha as Lakshmi, Anand Rao's wife
- Dakkshi Guttikonda as Rani, Karthik's wife
- Sonia Akula as Shanti, Anand Rao's daughter
- Dora Sai Teja as Rohan, Anand Rao's younger son
- Keshav Deepak as Doctor

== Soundtrack ==
Music is composed by D.S.R.

Track list
No.	Title	Lyrics	Singer(s)	Length
1.	"Coronavirus"	Sirasri	D.S.R	03:46

== Release ==
Initially, the film was reported to be released on 15 October 2020. However, it was delayed and released on 11 December 2020.

== Reception ==
Thadhagath Pathi of The Times of India rated the film two-and-a-half out of five stars and wrote, "The fact that the film was shot during the lockdown is appreciable but the message it aims to give seems outdated now. This is a film that might have worked brilliantly when news of the virus broke out in India". A critic from Telugucinema.com gave it one out of five stars and wrote, "‘Coronavirus’, the latest film on the pandemic, is another lousy film from RGV's company."
