= Tondapally =

- Village
- Interactive map of Tondapally
- Country: India
- State: Telangana
- District: Vikarabad
- Metro: Vikarabad district

Government
  - Body: Mandal Office

Languages
  - Official: Telugu
- Time zone: UTC+5:30 (IST)
- Planning agency: Panchayat
- Civic agency: Mandal Office

Tondapally is a village and panchayat in Vikarabad district, Ts, India. It falls under Parigi mandal.

== Education ==
Tondapally panchayath has improved literacy ratings compared to surrounding areas. This is attributed to the high levels connectivity to neighbouring major towns like Shadnagar and Pargi which have colleges and International Schools. Tondapally outputs a relatively high number of graduates who works in Capgemini, Infosys, Amazon (company), Kärcher etc...

== Agriculture ==
In Tondapally Panchayath, agriculture is the primary source of income and the region commonly grows Cotton, Corn, Wheat, Dal and Paddy. The region is locally known for its milk production as well.

== Connectivity ==
Tondapally is on the state highway which connects Telangana and Gulbarga, Karnataka. It is located 23 km from NH 7 which connects Hyderabad and Bangalore and it takes about an hour driving to reach Rajiv Gandhi International Airport.
