= 2022 Hyderabad gang rape =

Gang-rape of a 17-year old girl in Jubilee Hills, Hyderabad

- Date: 28 May 2022
- Time: 5 PM IST (UTC+05:30)
- Location: Jubilee Hills, Hyderabad, India
- Accused: 6

In May 2022, the gang rape of a 17-year-old girl in Road no. 44, Jubilee Hills, Hyderabad, sparked outrage across Telangana and India. The minor girl returning home after attending a get-together at Amnesia pub was gang-raped by six persons, including five minors in Jubilee Hills area of the State capital. All the accused were arrested by police from their separate hideouts.

== Incident ==
It was in May 2022 that the victim was brutally gang raped near Sri Peddamma Thalli Temple in Road no. 44, Jubilee Hills. Prima facie evidence indicated that the attack was pre-planned, as the perpetrators "had condoms on them and used protection while committing the offence", according to a police official. The Toyota Innova Crysta in which the gang rape took place had clear windows. However, the accused used temporary screens for covering them up on the day of the offence.

== Investigation ==
Banjara Hills ACP M Sudarshan was the investigating officer in the gang-rape case. Saaduddin Malik and Umair Khan were arrested in the beginning. The same month, police carried out potency test on the only major and three minors at Forensic Science department of Osmania General Hospital. The minor victim identified the six accused in the gang rape case during Test Identification Parade (TIP).

In July 2022, Jubilee Hills police filed the chargesheet against the six accused in the minor gangrape case at the Nampally Sessions court as well as the Juvenile Justice Board. The 600-page chargesheet has detailed statements from 65 witnesses with DNA reports, CCTV footage, phone and voice messages. Jubilee Hills police decided to seek trial of all the minors accused in the gangrape case as adults to ensure that they receive maximum punishment.

== Aftermath ==
In the last week of July 2022, the five minors were granted bail. Juvenile Justice Board allowed the four other minors accused to be released on bail after serving 50 days. As per reports in August 2022, one of the juveniles in the Jubilee hills minor’s gang-rape is reportedly being sent abroad.

Saduddin Malik was granted bail in August 2022 after 61 days in jail. Malik was in Chanchalguda Central Jail in judicial remand.

== Trial ==
On 30 September 2022, Juvenile Justice Board ordered four of the minors to be tried as adults. The fifth minor will face trial as a juvenile. The accused were assessed by a Professor of Psychiatry from the Institute of Mental Health (Erragadda).

BJP MP Arvind Dharmapuri questioned the "silence" of Chief Minister K. Chandrashekar Rao and Minister K. T. Rama Rao on the rise in crime against women in Telangana, asking if "they are promoting rapes". Minister K. T. Rama Rao tweeted that he was shocked to see the news of the rape incident in Hyderabad. In August 2022, K. T. Rama Rao said that loopholes in Juvenile Justice Act, Indian Penal Code and CrPC have resulted in rapists getting bail in the case. Telangana BJP chief Bandi Sanjay Kumar wrote to CM K. Chandrashekar Rao demanding to hand over the case to CBI. In June 2022, Chairman of Telangana State Wakf Board Mohammed Masiullah Khan was asked by the TRS to resign as his son was one of the rapists involved in the heinous crime. Congress Party demand the state government to set up a fast-track court investigation and trial.

Actor Sonu Sood said that he was shocked when he heard about the gang rape incident, called it ‘most unfortunate’, and said that he hoped it had never happened. Jubilee Hills police arrested a journalist, Subhan, for circulating photos and videos of accused involved in gang rape. He uploaded them on internet in the name of RS Media and they went viral.

== See also ==
- POCSO Act
- Rape in India
- 2012 Delhi gang rape and murder
- 2019 Hyderabad gang rape and murder
