= Valentines Night =

Indian romantic drama film

- Directed by: Anil Gopireddy
- Written by: Anil Gopireddy
- Produced by: Tripti Patil; Sudhir Yalangi; Mahindhar Narala
- Starring: Chaitanya Rao Madadi; Lavanya Sahukara
- Cinematography: Jayapal Reddy
- Edited by: Madhu Reddi
- Music by: Anil Gopi Reddy
- Production company: Swan Movies
- Release date: 26 January 2023
- Country: India
- Language: Telugu

Valentines Night is a 2023 Indian Telugu-language romantic drama film directed by Anil Gopireddy and starring Chaitanya Rao Madadi and Lavanya Sahukara. The film was released on 26 January 2023.

== Cast ==
- Chaitanya Rao Madadi as RJ Ajay
- Lavanya Sahukara as Priya
- Sunil as Krishnamohan
- Posani Krishna Murali as Velugu Krishnamurthy
- Srikanth Iyengar as Businessman
- Mukku Avinash as Ali
- Ravi Varma as Maddy
- Bindu Chandramouli as Maya
- Divya Dekate as Veda
- Lobo
- Inayana Sulthana

== Soundtrack ==
The music was composed by Anil Gopireddy.

Track listing
No.	Title	Lyrics	Singer(s)	Length
1.	"Selave Antu"	Anil Gopireddy	Anil Gopireddy	3:14
2.	"Uriki Dhuke Vayasulo"	Swathi Rapeti	Sony Komanduri	2:51
3.	"Life Oka Aatara"	Swathi Rapeti	Saisharan	3:18
Total length:				9:23

== Reception ==
A critic from Hindustan Times praised Chaitanya Rao and Sunil's acting, the story and the music while criticising the slow moving story and bold scenes. A critic from News18 praised the performances of the cast, the story, the direction and background music while criticising the editing and boring scenes.
