= Rachel Chatterjee =

Indian Civil Servant

Personal details
- Born: Rachel K.J Chandy; 29 December 1950 (age 75) Madras, Tamil Nadu, India
- Citizenship: India
- Spouse: Tishya Chatterjee (m. 1976)
- Children: 2 Sons
- Profession: Retired Indian Administrative Service (IAS) Officer; Social Worker

Rachel Chatterjee is a retired Indian Administrative Service (IAS) Officer and the first women to be appointed as the Chairperson of Andhra Pradesh Public Service Commission.

== Biography ==
She was born to K.J Chandy in Chennai, Tamil Nadu and was raised in a Syrian Christian family. She has two sisters and one brother. She did her M. A. in English and a diploma in Journalism. She joined the Indian Administrative Services in 1975 and was allotted to the Andhra Pradesh Cadre.

She is married to Tishya Chatterjee, her batch mate and also a bureaucrat, in 1976. They have two children. She has worked for more than thirty as a bureaucrat at different places and has been a district collector in three different districts.

== Positions held ==
- District Collector of Anantapur District(1983–1984).
- Commissioner of Municipal Corporation Of Hyderabad (1992–1993).
- Chairman & Managing Director for AP Transco.
- Principal Secretary to Department of Medical & Health.
- Principal Secretary to Department of Social Welfare.
- Director, Ministry of Textiles, Govt. of India (1984–1985).

== Achievements ==
The Government of Canada awarded her the Lester Pearson Fellowship at the University of Ottawa.
